= Denny Hamlin =

American racing driver and team owner (born 1980)

- Hamlin at Las Vegas Motor Speedway in 2026
- Born: James Dennis Alan Hamlin; November 18, 1980 (age 46); Tampa, Florida, U.S.
- Height: 6 ft 0 in (1.83 m)
- Weight: 154 lb (70 kg)
- Achievements: As Driver; 2026 NASCAR Cup Series Regular Season Champion; 2016, 2019, 2020 Daytona 500 Winner; 2010, 2017, 2021 Southern 500 Winner; 2022 Coca-Cola 600 Winner; 2015, 2026 NASCAR All-Star Race Winner; 2008, 2014, 2017 Can-Am Duels Winner; 2006, 2014, 2016, 2024 Busch Light Clash Winner; Records; 8 Wins at Pocono Raceway (Most all time); 4 Wins at Kansas Speedway (Most all time); Winner of the closest Daytona 500; First rookie to qualify for Chase for the Nextel Cup (2006); 9th on NASCAR's All-Time Wins List; As Owner; 2026 Daytona 500 Winner; 2025, 2026 Brickyard 400 Winner
- Awards: 2006 Nextel Cup Series Rookie of the Year; Named one of NASCAR's 75 Greatest Drivers (2023)

NASCAR Cup Series career
- 757 races run over 22 years
- Car no., team: No. 11 (Joe Gibbs Racing)
- 2026 position: 3rd
- Best finish: 2nd (2010, 2025)
- First race: 2005 Banquet 400 (Kansas)
- Last race: 2026 Season Finale 400 (Homestead)
- First win: 2006 Pocono 500 (Pocono)
- Last win: 2026 The Great American Getaway 400 (Pocono)
Wins	Top tens	Poles
64	400	54

NASCAR O'Reilly Auto Parts Series career
- 164 races run over 19 years
- 2023 position: 77th
- Best finish: 4th (2006)
- First race: 2004 BI-LO 200 (Darlington)
- Last race: 2023 Sport Clips Haircuts VFW 200 (Darlington)
- First win: 2006 Telcel-Motorola 200 (Mexico City)
- Last win: 2023 Sport Clips Haircuts VFW 200 (Darlington)
Wins	Top tens	Poles
18	101	21

NASCAR FedEx Freight Truck Series career
- 16 races run over 9 years
- 2013 position: 93rd
- Best finish: 37th (2004)
- First race: 2004 Power Stroke Diesel 200 (IRP)
- Last race: 2013 Kroger 200 (Martinsville)
- First win: 2011 Kroger 200 (Martinsville)
- Last win: 2012 Kroger 200 (Martinsville)
Wins	Top tens	Poles
2	10	1

ARCA Menards Series career
- 2 races run over 2 years
- Best finish: 107th (2004)
- First race: 2004 Food World 300 (Talladega)
- Last race: 2005 PFG Lester 150 (Nashville)
Wins	Top tens	Poles
0	1	0

Signature
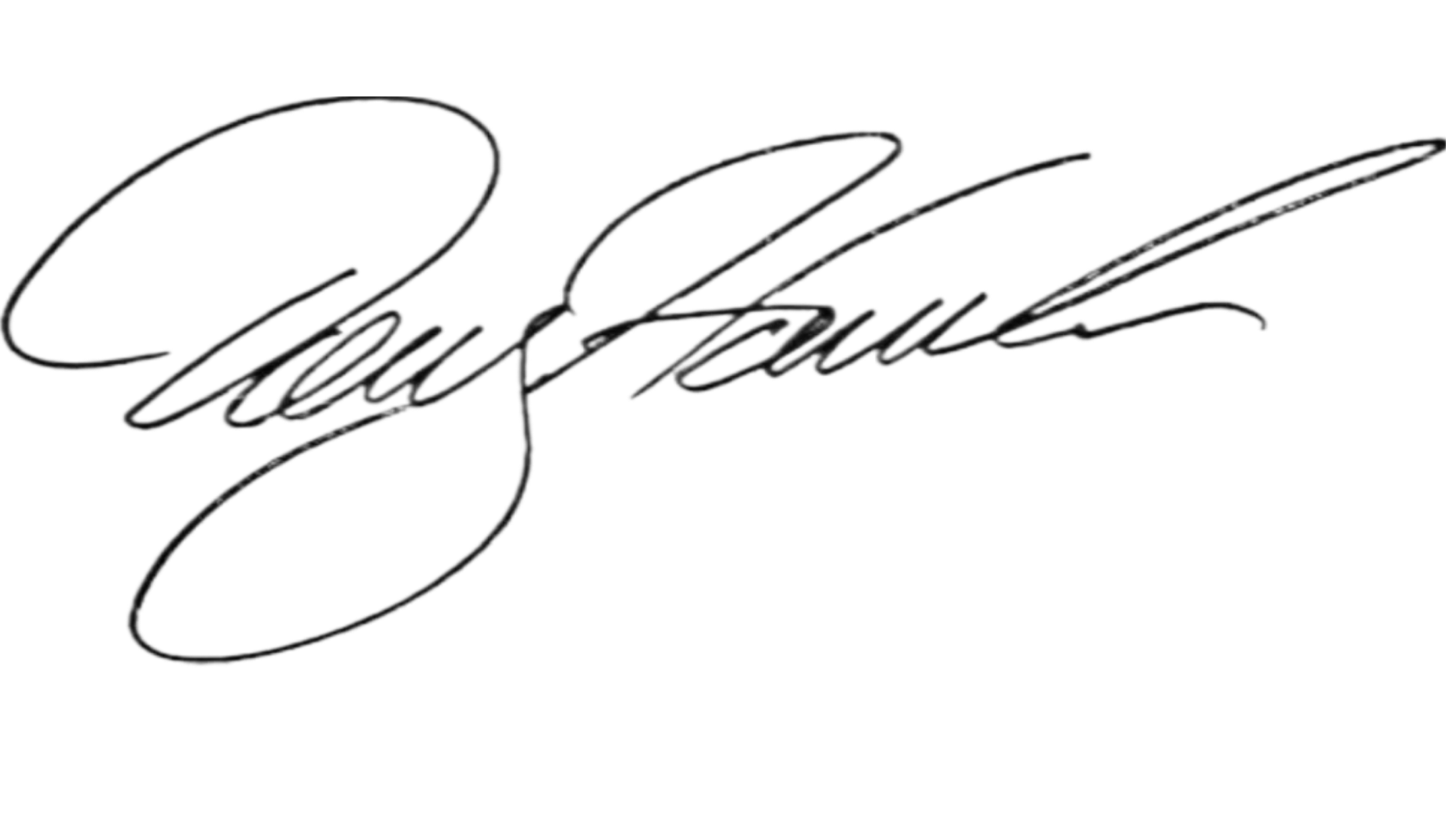
- Statistics up to date as of November 8, 2026.

James Dennis Alan Hamlin (born November 18, 1980) is an American professional stock car racing driver and team owner. He competes full-time in the NASCAR Cup Series, driving the No. 11 Toyota Camry XSE for Joe Gibbs Racing. He also co-owns and operates 23XI Racing with basketball Hall of Famer Michael Jordan.

As a driver, Hamlin has achieved a total of 64 NASCAR Cup Series victories. His notable wins include the Coca-Cola 600 in 2022, the Southern 500 in 2010, 2017, and 2021, and the Daytona 500 in 2016, 2019, and 2020. He is also one of five drivers in history to win the Daytona 500 in back-to-back seasons, joining the ranks of Richard Petty, Cale Yarborough, Sterling Marlin, and William Byron.

Widely regarded as the greatest driver in NASCAR history to never have won a championship, Hamlin holds the record for the most wins in the NASCAR Cup Series without winning a championship. Despite not securing a title, he has reached the NASCAR Cup Series Chase 20 times out of his 21 seasons (as of 2026), missing only in 2013, when a collision caused an injury that sidelined him for a significant portion of the early season. Hamlin drew attention right from his 2006 rookie season, when he finished third overall and won Rookie of the Year.

== Driving career ==
=== Beginnings ===
Hamlin was born in Tampa, Florida, and spent most of his childhood in Chesterfield Court House, Virginia. He began his racing career at the age of seven in 1988, racing go-karts. By 1997, at the age of fifteen, he had won the WKA Manufacturers Cup. At the age of sixteen, he started racing mini stocks, and in his first stock car race at Langley Speedway, he not only secured the pole position but also won the race. Hamlin progressed to the Grand Stock division in 1998 and moved on to Late Model Stock Cars in 2000. In 2002, he achieved ten Late Model victories, surpassing that with 25 wins and thirty poles out of 36 races in 2003. In 2004, while competing full-time in Late Model Stock Cars, he signed a driver development contract with Joe Gibbs Racing.

=== NASCAR career ===
==== 2004–2006 ====
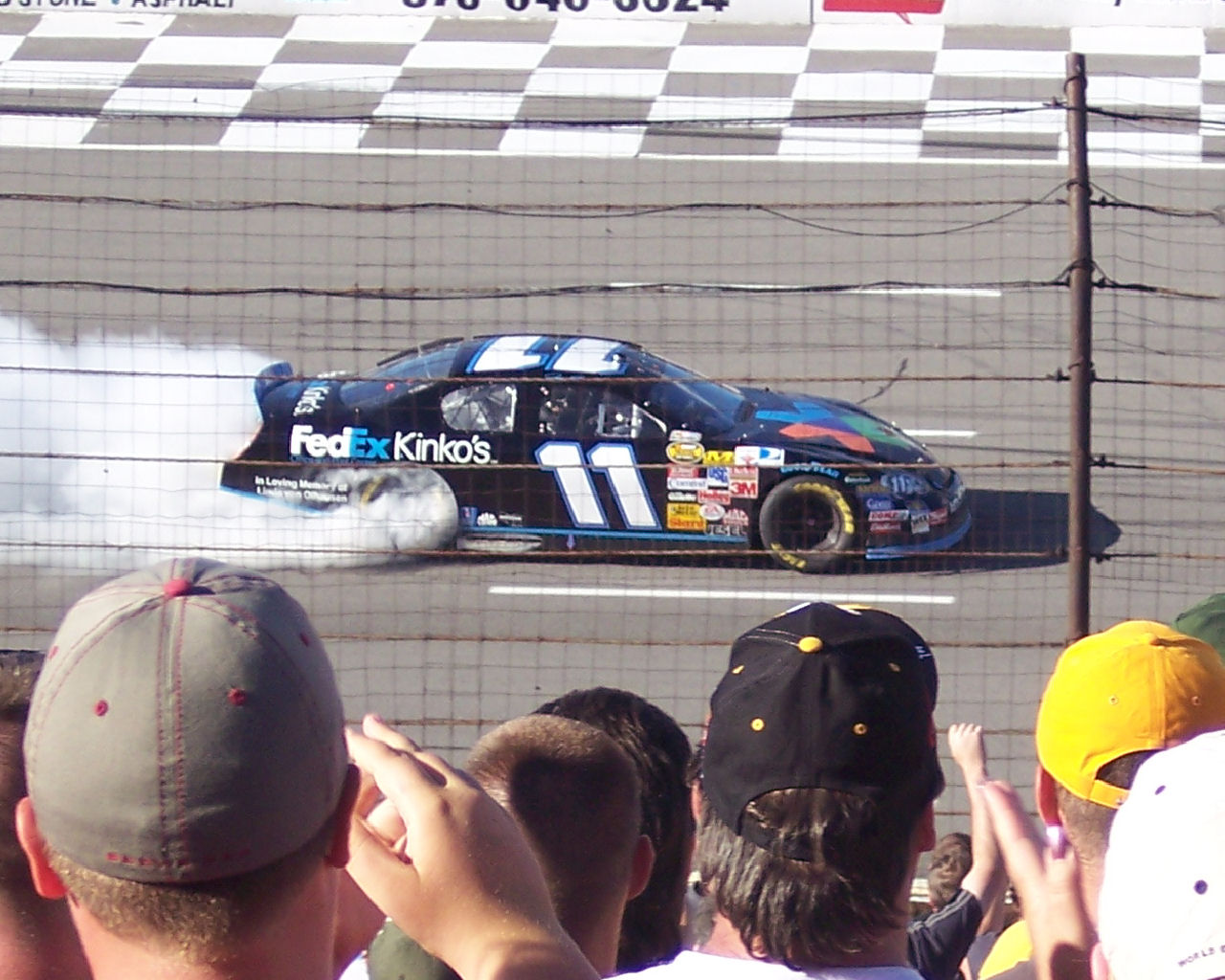
Hamlin celebrating after winning the 2006 Pennsylvania 500

In 2004, Hamlin competed in five NASCAR Craftsman Truck Series races with EJP Racing, achieving a tenth-place finish in his debut at IRP. He then made his first ARCA RE/MAX Series start at Talladega Superspeedway, finishing third in the No. 10 Pontiac for Fast Track Racing, owned by Andy Hillenburg. Hamlin's final race of the year was at Darlington Raceway, where he made his Busch Series debut. Starting twenty-seventh due to a rainout, he finished eighth in the No. 18 Joe Gibbs Driven Performance Oil Chevrolet.

In 2005, Hamlin ran the full 2005 season in the Busch Series after replacing Mike Bliss in the No. 20 Rockwell Automation-sponsored Chevrolet. As a rookie, he finished fifth in the final championship points standings, achieving eleven top-ten finishes and earning $1,064,110 ($1,754,177 Today) Hamlin also made his debut in the Nextel Cup Series, driving the No. 11 FedEx-sponsored Chevrolet at Kansas Speedway. He was announced as the full-time driver for the No. 11 car for the 2006 season after Jason Leffler was released. In his seven Cup starts that year, he secured three top-ten finishes and one pole position at Phoenix.

In 2006, Hamlin completed his first full season in the NASCAR Nextel Cup Series while also competing full-time in the Busch Series. In his inaugural restrictor-plate race as a Nextel Cup driver, he won the 70-lap Budweiser Shootout, defeating all the previous year's pole winners and becoming the first Rookie of the Year candidate to win the event. Hamlin secured his first career Busch Series victory at Autódromo Hermanos Rodríguez on March 5. On June 11, 2006, he earned his first Cup Series win at the Pocono 500, where he also achieved his second career pole. Hamlin followed this with a second win on July 23 in the Pennsylvania 500, also at Pocono Raceway, making him only the second rookie in Nextel Cup history to sweep both races at a track in the same season (the first being Jimmie Johnson at Dover International Speedway in 2002), with both victories coming from pole position. Hamlin won the Raybestos Rookie of the Year award and finished third in the final Cup standings, achieving the highest points finish for a rookie in the modern era of NASCAR, and the best since James Hylton in 1966. Notably, he became the first rookie to qualify for the Chase for the Nextel Cup, finishing third in points.

==== 2007–2008 ====
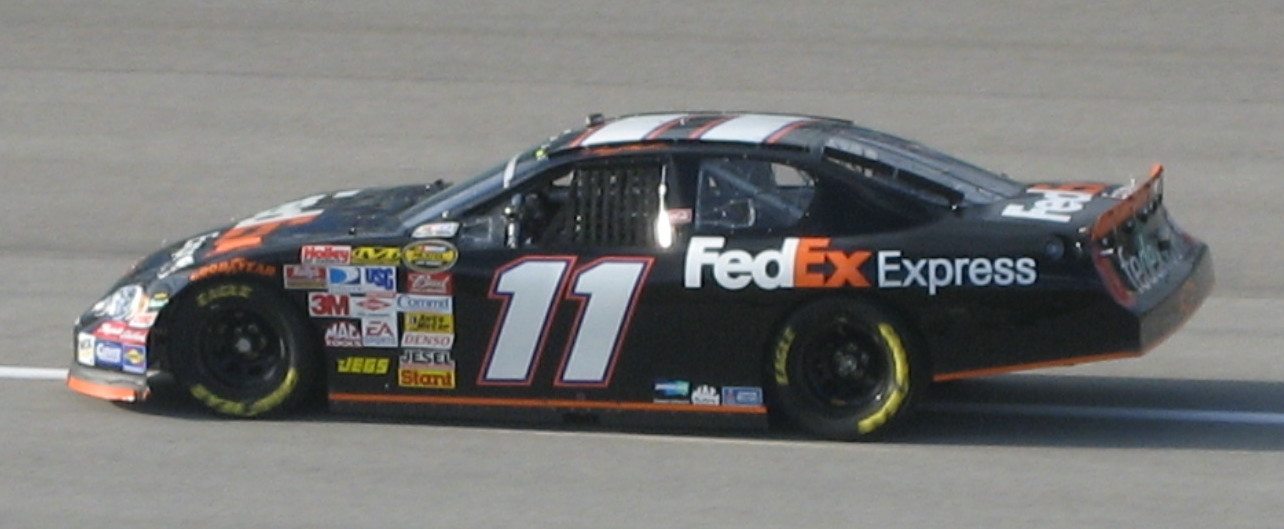
Hamlin practicing for the 2007 Ford 400 at the Homestead-Miami Speedway

in 2007, Hamlin began the 2007 Cup season with a 28th-place finish in the Daytona 500. He achieved his third career Cup victory at the Lenox Industrial Tools 300 at New Hampshire. However, he finished 43rd in the Pepsi 400 at Daytona after getting involved in an early wreck, marking the first 43rd-place finish of his career. Hamlin clinched a spot in the Chase for the Cup, earning the sixth seed with a fifty-point deficit to the leader, but ultimately finished twelfth overall in the final standings. In the Nationwide Series, Hamlin achieved three victories, winning races at Darlington, Michigan, and Dover while driving the No. 20 Rockwell Automation Chevrolet. He also secured a victory at Milwaukee, although Aric Almirola started the race and drove for sixty laps before handing the car over to Hamlin. As a result, Almirola received the points, purse, and credit for the win.

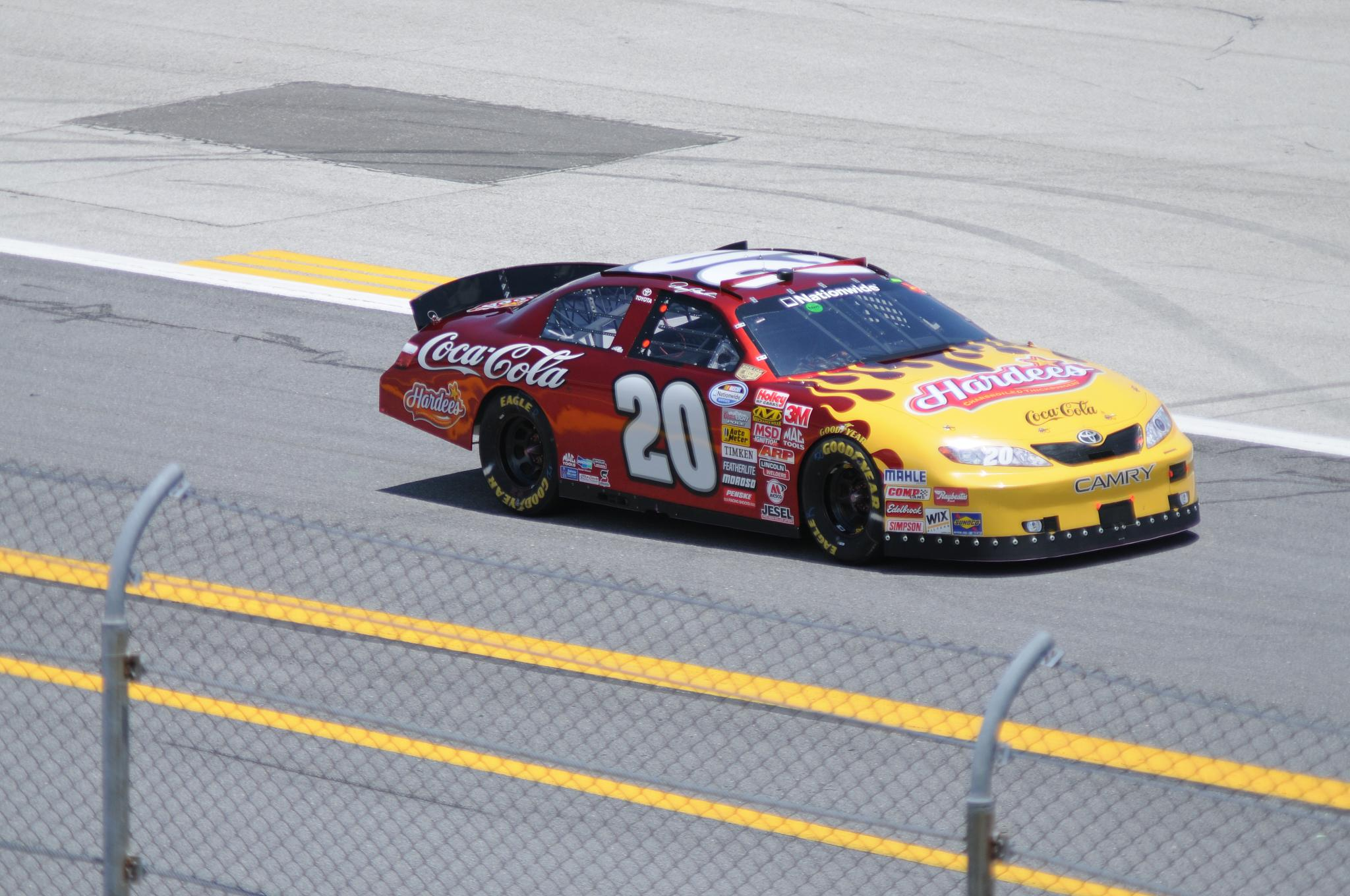
2008 Nationwide car

In 2008, Hamlin had a season similar to the previous year, finishing eighth in points and winning early in the season at Martinsville. At Richmond, he led 381 out of 410 laps in the Crown Royal Presents the Dan Lowry 400, showcasing one of the most dominant performances by a driver since 2000, but ultimately finished 24th after cutting a tire. Additionally, he won four races in the Nationwide Series, driving both the No. 18 and No. 20 cars for Gibbs, as well as the No. 32 Dollar General/Hass Avocados-sponsored car for Braun Racing.

==== 2009: 4-win season ====
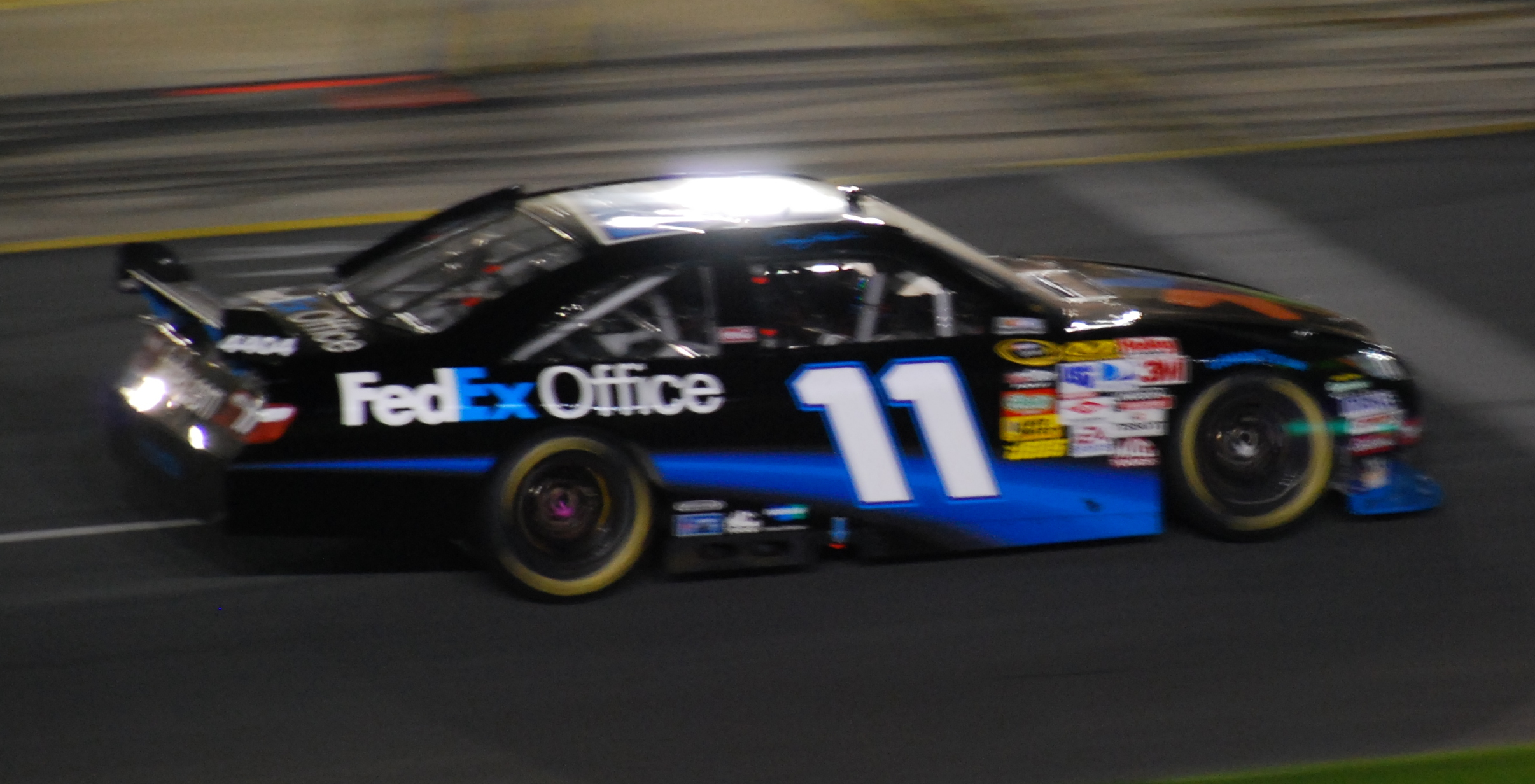
Hamlin racing at Lowe's Motor Speedway in 2009

In 2009, he continued driving the No. 11 car in The Sprint Cup Series and also shared the No. 20 car for Joe Gibbs Racing in the Nationwide Series. On August 3, 2009, Hamlin secured his fifth career Cup win at Pocono. Before the final restart, he confidently declared, "I'm going to win this race." True to his word, he surged from sixth to first, breaking a fifty-race winless streak. This victory marked his third at Pocono and was especially emotional, as it came just days after the passing of his grandmother, Thelma Clark.

Hamlin dominated once again at Richmond, finally securing a win at his home track. On October 25, 2009, he held off Jimmie Johnson to win the TUMS Fast Relief 500 at Martinsville Speedway. He concluded the 2009 NASCAR Sprint Cup Series season with a victory at the Ford 400 at Homestead–Miami Speedway, starting from the 38th position and led seventy laps. This capped off his year with an impressive fifth-place finish in the overall standings, achieving four wins, fifteen top-five finishes, and twenty top-ten finishes.

==== 2010: 8-win season and runner-up in points ====
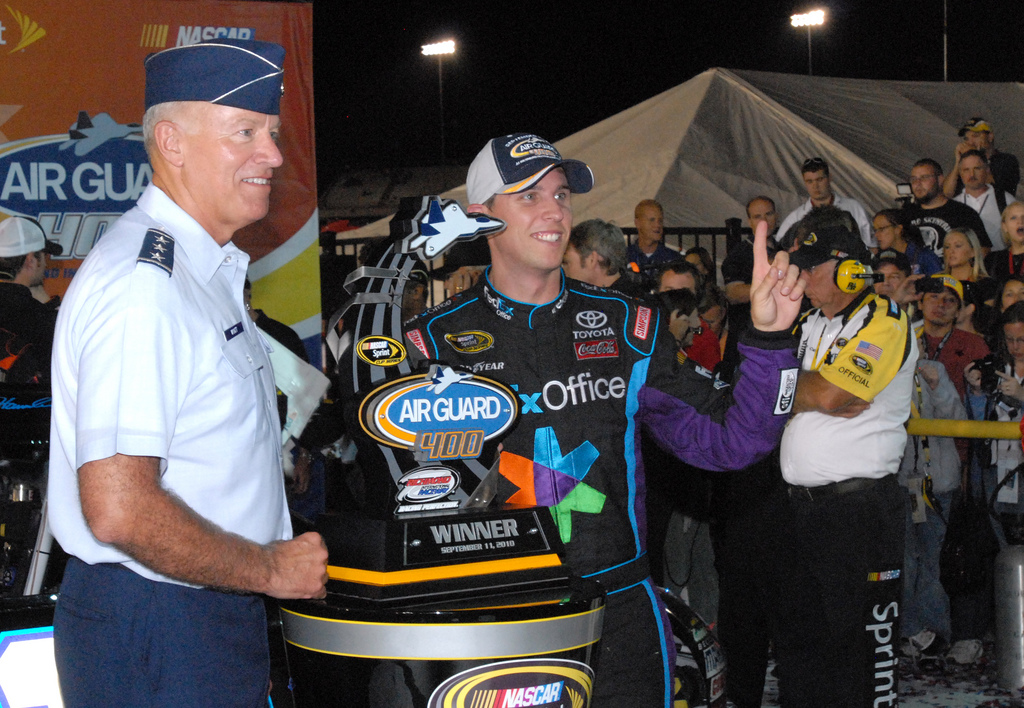
Hamlin in victory lane after winning the 2010 Air Guard 400

In 2010, Hamlin entered the season with high expectations, and many saw him as a strong contender to unseat Jimmie Johnson as the Sprint Cup Champion. However, on January 22, he tore the anterior cruciate ligament (ACL) in his left knee while playing basketball. Despite the injury, Hamlin postponed surgery until after the season to focus on competing. On March 27, he announced that he would undergo knee surgery the following Monday to prevent further damage.

On March 29, 2010, Hamlin won the rain-postponed race at Martinsville Speedway in dramatic fashion, finishing ahead of his Joe Gibbs Racing teammate Joey Logano and Jeff Gordon. Just two days later, he underwent knee surgery to repair a torn ligament in his left knee. Despite the setback, Hamlin returned to racing on April 19, 2010, just three weeks after the procedure. Starting from 28th at Texas, he worked his way up through the field and, with thirteen laps remaining, restarted in second place. Hamlin passed Jeff Burton on the outside and held off Jimmie Johnson to secure his tenth career win and his second victory in three races.

Less than three weeks later, on May 8, Hamlin visited Victory Lane for the third time in 2010 at Darlington Raceway. He had a dominant weekend, winning both the Sprint Cup and Nationwide Series events. Hamlin became the first driver to sweep both races at Darlington since Mark Martin in 1993. Hamlin began in 8th position at Saturday night's Showtime Southern 500, leading 108 laps to secure the victory. A few races later, he dominated the Gillette Fusion ProGlide 500 Presented by Target at Pocono Raceway, leading the most laps and earning his twelfth career win, his fourth of the season, and his fourth at Pocono. The following week, Hamlin set a career-high with his fifth win of the season, triumphing at Michigan after starting seventh.

Later in the 2010 season, Hamlin finished 43rd in the Emory Healthcare 500 at Atlanta, dropping five positions in the Chase standings to 10th overall. Despite the setback, the top ten drivers in the Chase were locked in after Atlanta, ensuring Hamlin's spot in the 2010 Chase for the Sprint Cup. In the first Chase race, Carl Edwards' driver error caused Hamlin to spin with 85 laps remaining. As several cars ahead ran out of fuel, Hamlin narrowly lost to Clint Bowyer.

In the AAA 400 at Dover, Hamlin finished 9th, retaining the points lead by 35 over Jimmie Johnson. The following week at Kansas, Hamlin struggled with a difficult-handling car and finished twelfth, which cost him the points lead. Jimmie Johnson, who finished second, took an eight-point advantage. The next week at California, Hamlin managed a top-ten finish but continued to lose ground to Johnson's No. 48 team. At Charlotte Motor Speedway, Denny Hamlin led a lap—his first lead in the Chase—finishing 4th, one spot behind points leader Jimmie Johnson, which cost him five points. However, he achieved a significant triumph at Martinsville Speedway, securing his series-leading seventh victory of the season. This victory marked Hamlin's third consecutive win at Martinsville and his fourth overall at the historic track, narrowing the points gap to just six behind Jimmie Johnson, who finished 5th.

Next up was the Amp Energy Juice 500 at Talladega Superspeedway. Denny Hamlin started in seventeenth place and worked his way up to finish 9th, two spots behind points leader Jimmie Johnson. This result put Hamlin eight points further behind in the standings, totaling fourteen points. He then won the AAA Texas 500 at Texas Motor Speedway, taking the lead in the standings by 33 points over Johnson with two races remaining. At Phoenix, Hamlin started 14th but finished twelfth. After the race, he was furious and threw a water bottle in frustration because he had to pit with fourteen laps to go due to a fuel shortage. With one race left, Hamlin led Johnson by fifteen points and was 46 points ahead of Kevin Harvick. However, in the Final race, he lost the lead to Johnson after spinning out and ultimately finished fourteenth, ending up 39 points behind Johnson.

==== 2011 ====
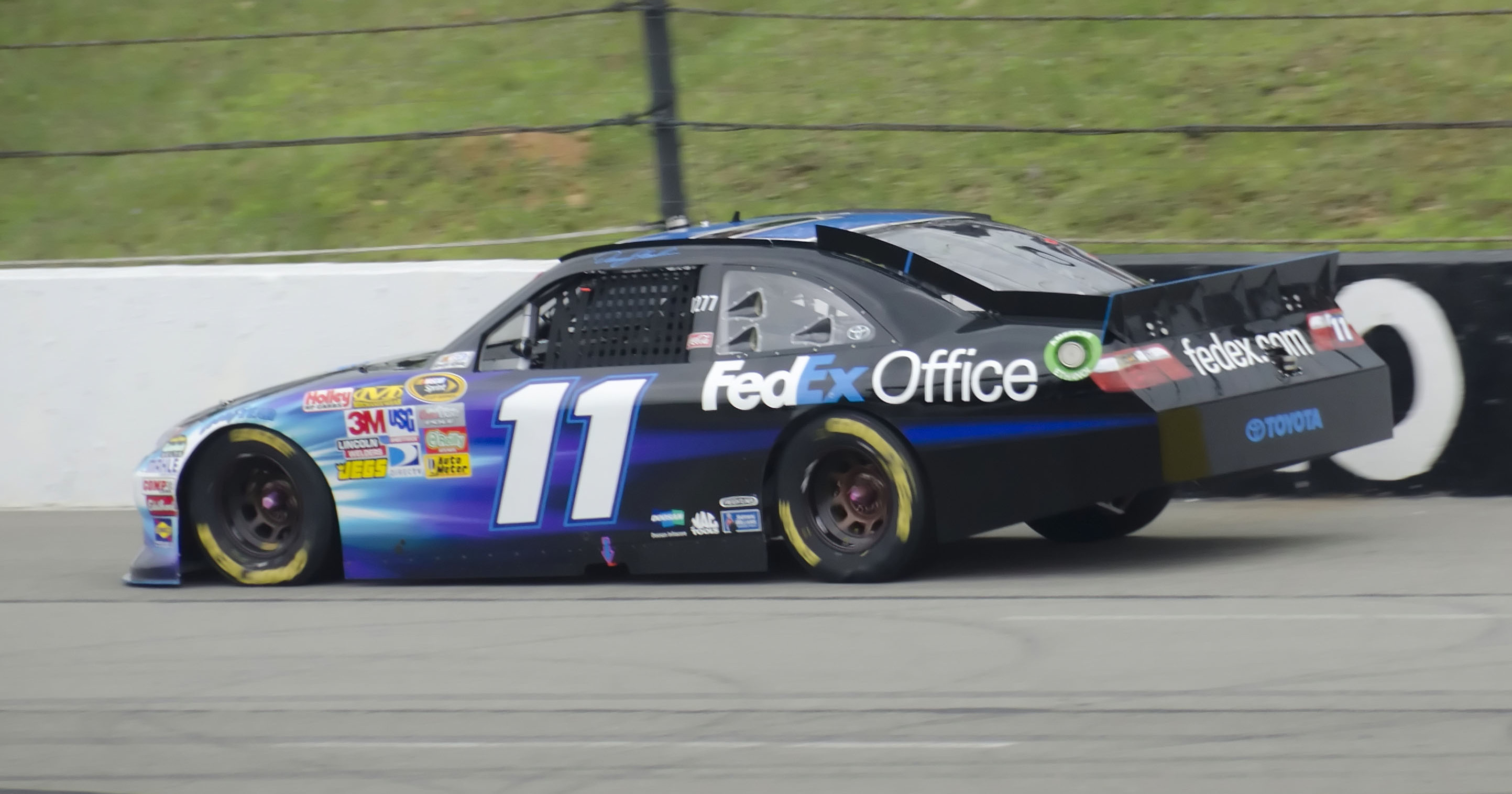
Hamlin at Pocono Raceway in 2011

In 2011, Hamlin nearly won the Budweiser Shootout, but the victory was denied when Kurt Busch passed him after Hamlin crossed the yellow line in turn four while attempting to overtake Ryan Newman.

Hamlin struggled in the first eight races, with his only top-ten finish being a seventh place at Las Vegas. However, he turned things around at Richmond, where he won both his charity event and the Nationwide race, finishing second to teammate Kyle Busch. After finishing outside the top-ten at Dover, he rebounded with top finishes of tenth and third at Charlotte and Kansas, respectively.

After his third-place finish at Kansas, he climbed to eleventh in points, just one point shy of tenth place, as the series headed to his favorite track, Pocono. A win there would have tied him for the most all-time victories at the track. However, after a disappointing nineteenth-place finish, he moved on to Michigan, where he had previously secured a first and second place finish in 2010. Before the first practice at Michigan, NASCAR confiscated unapproved sumps from the three Joe Gibbs Racing teams, including Hamlin's. After showing signs of mediocrity during practices and qualifying, Hamlin secured the tenth position in the field. This victory propelled him from twelfth in the standings—where he would have been at risk of being replaced in the Chase by Jeff Gordon—to ninth, guaranteeing him a spot in the Chase.

At the end of the season, Joe Gibbs Racing announced that Mike Ford would not return as Hamlin's crew chief for the 2012 season.

==== 2012: New crew chief and 5 win season ====
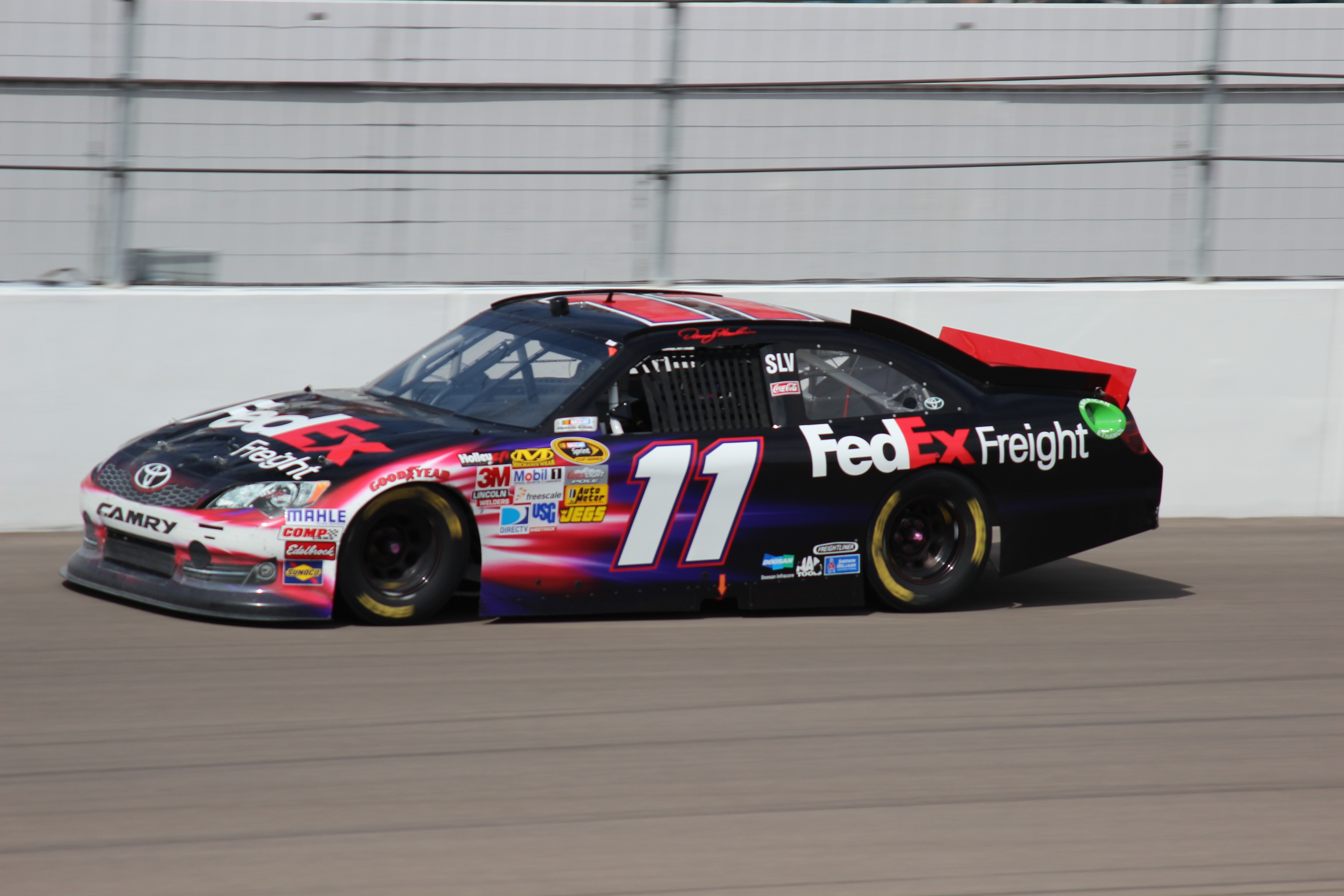
Hamlin at Las Vegas Motor Speedway in 2012

In 2012, Joe Gibbs Racing announced that Darian Grubb would replace Mike Ford as Hamlin's crew chief for the season. Grubb had previously served as Tony Stewart's crew chief, guiding Stewart to his third Sprint Cup title in 2011.

Hamlin earned his first win of the year in the second race at Phoenix. On April 22, 2012, he secured his second victory at Kansas, outlasting Martin Truex Jr. He claimed his third win at Bristol on August 26 in the Irwin Tools Night Race. A week later, Hamlin became the first driver of the year to earn back-to-back wins, defeating Truex again at the AdvoCare 500 in Atlanta. Two weeks later, he dominated the Sylvania 300 at New Hampshire Motor Speedway, winning from a 32nd-place start.

==== 2013: Back injury and feud with Joey Logano ====
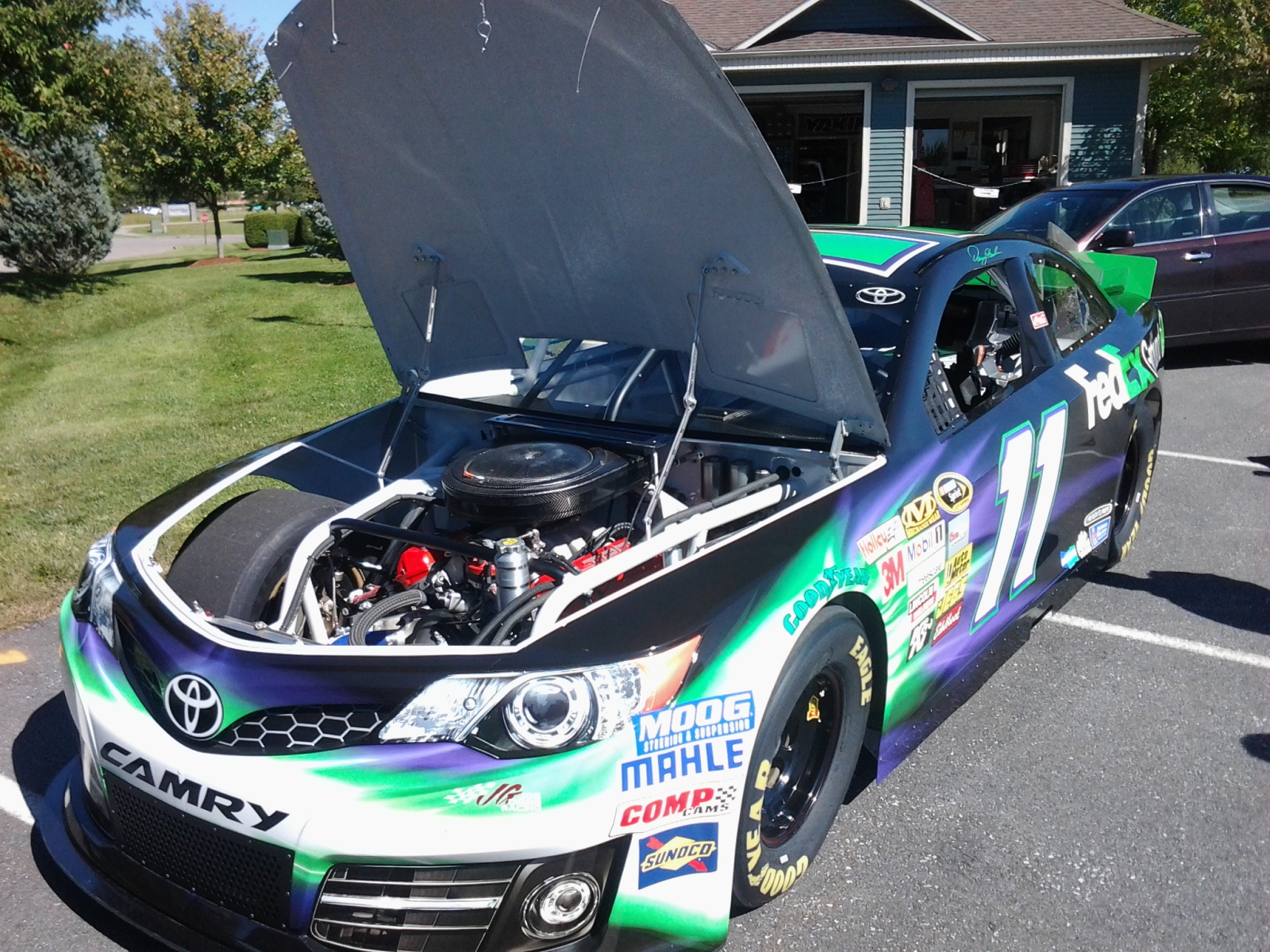
Front/side view of Hamlin's car

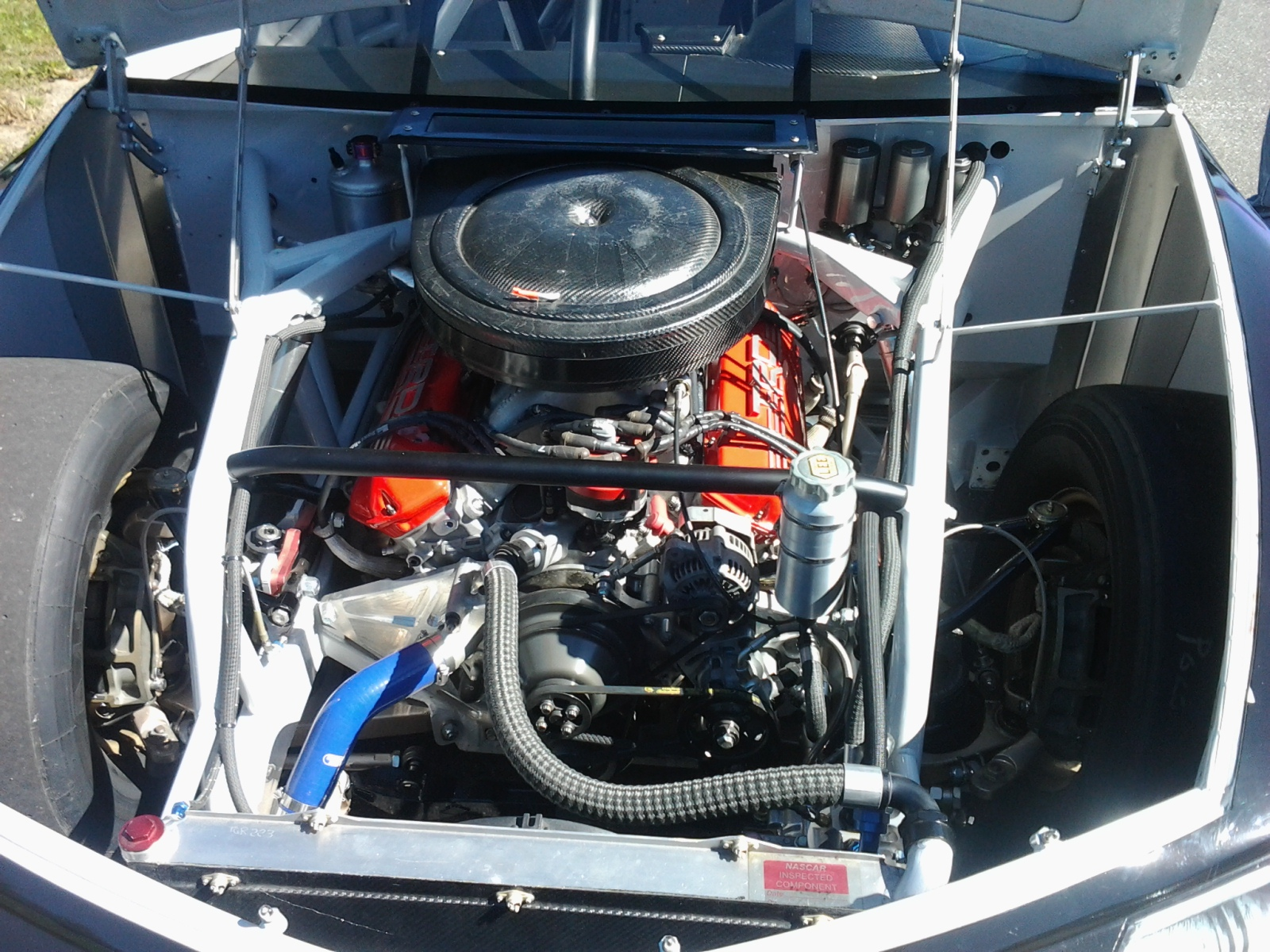
Engine of Hamlin's Toyota

In 2013, Hamlin's season began on a rough note with crashes in both the Sprint Unlimited and the Budweiser Duel. The accident in the Duel forced him to use a backup car for the Daytona 500, where he started 35th, led 33 laps, and finished fourteenth. He showed improvement the following week with a third-place finish at Phoenix, followed by a fifteenth-place result in Las Vegas. At Bristol, despite leading the most laps, he ran out of fuel. Controversy arose when Hamlin spun his former teammate, Joey Logano, during a battle for position, leading to a heated exchange between the two in the garage after the race.

At Fontana, Hamlin secured his first pole of the season. On the final restart, he was in twelfth place but made an impressive charge, reaching third with twelve laps remaining. He soon passed both Kyle and Kurt Busch to contend for the lead alongside Joey Logano. The rivalry between Hamlin and Logano intensified as they battled side by side for the victory in the final two laps. On the white flag lap, Hamlin edged ahead entering Turn 3, but Logano drifted up the track, making contact with Hamlin. As Hamlin tried to regain control, he clipped Logano, sending Logano into the outside wall. Hamlin then crashed head-on into an inside retaining wall, while their incident allowed Hamlin's teammate, Kyle Busch, to take the win. After the crash, Hamlin climbed out of the car but immediately collapsed on the track. He was airlifted to the hospital as a precaution. While in the hospital, Hamlin interpreted Logano's post-race remarks about their battle as a sign that Logano held a grudge and had retaliated against him. The following day, it was announced that Hamlin had suffered a severe L1 Vertebral compression fracture, or collapsed vertebra. Dr. Petty, Hamlin's JGR physician, stated on Tuesday that Hamlin's back would heal in six weeks, requiring time off from racing. To fill in for Hamlin, two part-time drivers from Michael Waltrip Racing stepped up: Mark Martin drove at Martinsville, and Brian Vickers covered four additional races.

He returned at Talladega for the Aaron's 499, telling reporters that, since he wasn't ready to run a full race, he planned to switch with Brian Vickers during the first caution and pit stop using a special exit on the car's roof. As planned, Hamlin swapped with Vickers on lap 23 during a caution. According to NASCAR rules, Hamlin would still receive credit for the results since he started the race. Unfortunately, Vickers was caught in a 14-car wreck on lap 43, leaving the car with a 34th-place finish.

At Darlington, Hamlin returned to racing for the first time since his injury, qualifying sixth. In the closing laps, he held off Jeff Gordon to secure a second-place finish behind teammate Matt Kenseth. At the Coca-Cola 600 in Charlotte, Hamlin earned the pole position with a record speed of 195.624 miles per hour (314.826 km/h), surpassing the previous record of 193.708 miles per hour (311.743 km/h) set by Greg Biffle. During the race, he led six laps and ultimately finished fourth. At Dover, Hamlin started from the pole for the second consecutive week and led 41 laps before cutting a tire on lap 378, which caused him to crash and finish 34th. At Pocono, he started in seventeenth place and showed improvement by finishing eighth.

Hamlin struggled at Michigan, Sonoma, and Kentucky, finishing 30th, 23rd, and 35th, respectively. These results left him in 25th place in the points standings, 150 points behind 20th place. Without any wins, his chances of securing a Wildcard bid for the Chase were effectively eliminated. At Daytona, Hamlin started 24th and led twenty laps before being involved in a wreck with Juan Pablo Montoya and Martin Truex Jr. Although he remained on the track a lap down and received the free pass after the next caution, disaster struck on lap 148 when he hit the tri-oval wall head-on, and his car was subsequently struck by A. J. Allmendinger, causing it to go airborne.

He crashed at Pocono on lap fifteen after losing control of his car in the third turn, jeopardizing his chances of making the Chase for the first time in his career. Although he had participated in seven races in 2005, his first appearance was during a Chase race. At Michigan, he was officially eliminated from the Chase, even if he won the next four races, due to being too far behind in the points.

At Richmond, Hamlin received an apology text from Logano regarding their incident at Auto Club, but he chose not to respond. In a later interview, Hamlin expressed his belief that Logano's message was more about wanting Hamlin to avoid interfering with his title hopes rather than genuine remorse. Nevertheless, by the following season, both Hamlin and Logano declared that their feud was over.

Despite finishing 23rd in the points standings, Hamlin had a noteworthy season, highlighted by his victory in the season finale at Homestead. He secured the win after a fierce battle with Matt Kenseth and Dale Earnhardt Jr. in the final thirty laps.

==== 2014: First Championship 4 Appearance ====
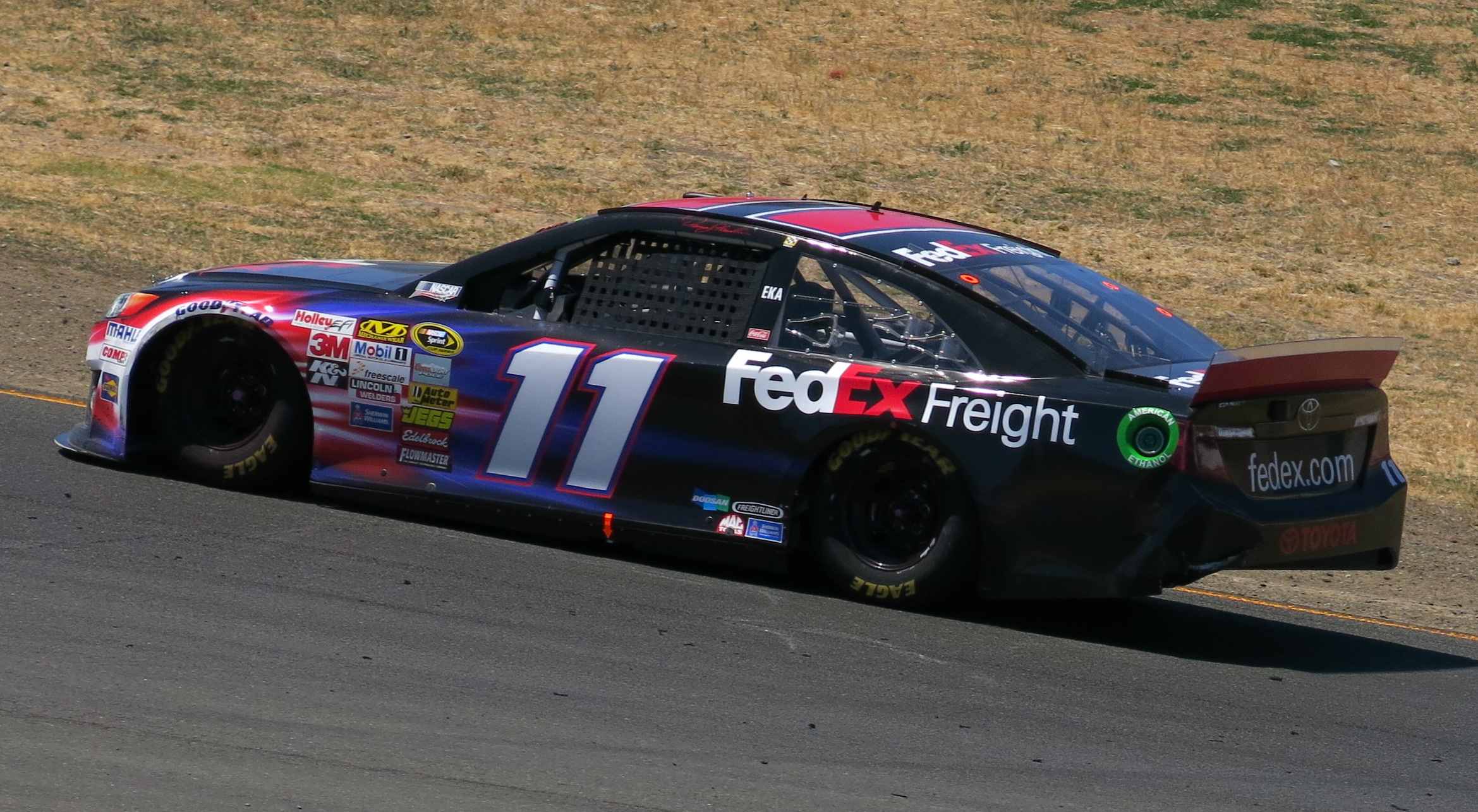
Hamlin at Sonoma Raceway in 2014

In 2014, Hamlin began the season on a high note by winning the pole position and leading all three segments of the Sprint Unlimited, ultimately securing victory in the race. He followed this success by winning the second Budweiser Duel. In the Daytona 500, Hamlin started in third place and led for sixteen laps, emerging as a fan favorite to win and potentially sweep all three Sprint Cup events during Speedweeks. However, he was unable to overtake Dale Earnhardt Jr. in the final two laps and finished in second place.

At Auto Club, Hamlin developed a sinus infection that affected his vision just hours before the race. A half-hour before the green flag, Joe Gibbs Racing replaced him with Sam Hornish Jr., who drove Hamlin's car to a seventeenth place finish. A few days later, it was revealed that the infection was caused by a piece of metal lodged in Hamlin's eye. At Talladega, Hamlin won the race after the caution flag waved during the final lap.

At the Brickyard 400, Hamlin finished third, but his No. 11 car failed post-race inspection. NASCAR impounded the vehicle for further investigation. Two days later, NASCAR suspended crew chief Darian Grubb and car chief Wesley Sherrill for six races. They fined Grubb $125,000, docked Hamlin 75 driver points, and Joe Gibbs Racing 75 owner points. Additionally, members of the No. 11 team were placed on probation until December 31, 2014. Initially, Joe Gibbs and the team considered appealing the penalties but later decided against it. In response to the penalties, Hamlin stated, "We'll just simply move forward and not let this affect our performances."

At Bristol, Hamlin seemed poised to win, leading many laps until he crashed after contact with Kevin Harvick while vying for the lead. In frustration, Hamlin angrily threw his HANS device at Harvick's car during a caution period. Some fans speculated that NASCAR should have penalized Hamlin for exiting his car before safety workers arrived, a rule instituted after the tragic incident involving Tony Stewart and Kevin Ward Jr. However, NASCAR decided against penalizing Hamlin, stating that safety workers had instructed him to exit the car via radio and allowed him to throw the device. Harvick later apologized for causing the crash on Twitter, while Hamlin indicated that his acceptance of the apology would depend on Harvick's future conduct on the track.

Despite the shortcomings of his and his team during the regular season, Hamlin managed to have a consistent Chase, securing a spot among the final four title contenders for the final round. With twenty laps to go, he was leading both the race and the championship. However, a caution came out, and Darian Grubb, his crew chief, opted not to stop for fresh tires and fuel, a decision that proved costly. Hamlin finished the race in seventh place and ended up third in the championship standings.

==== 2015 ====
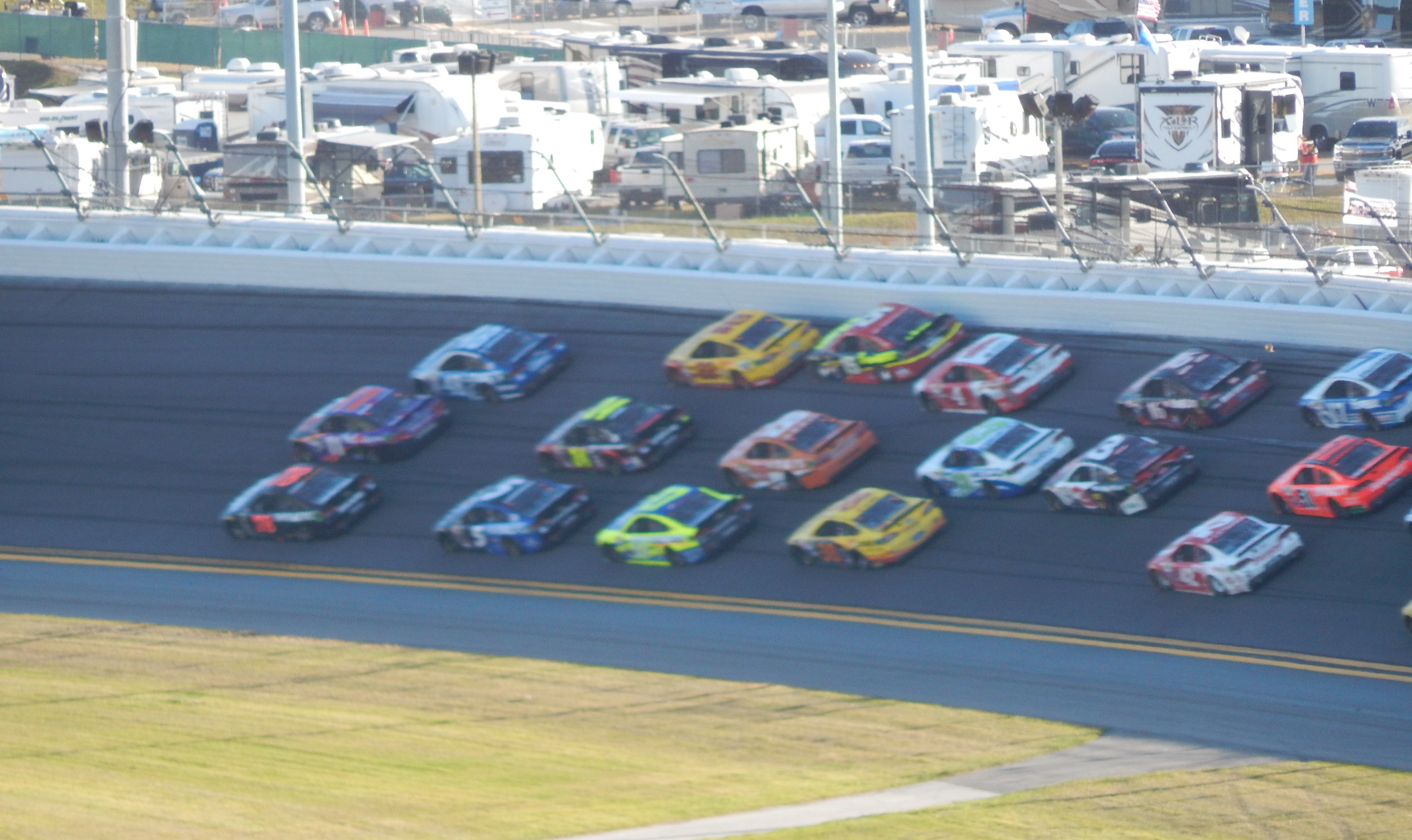
Hamlin led with 11 laps remaining in the 2015 Daytona 500.

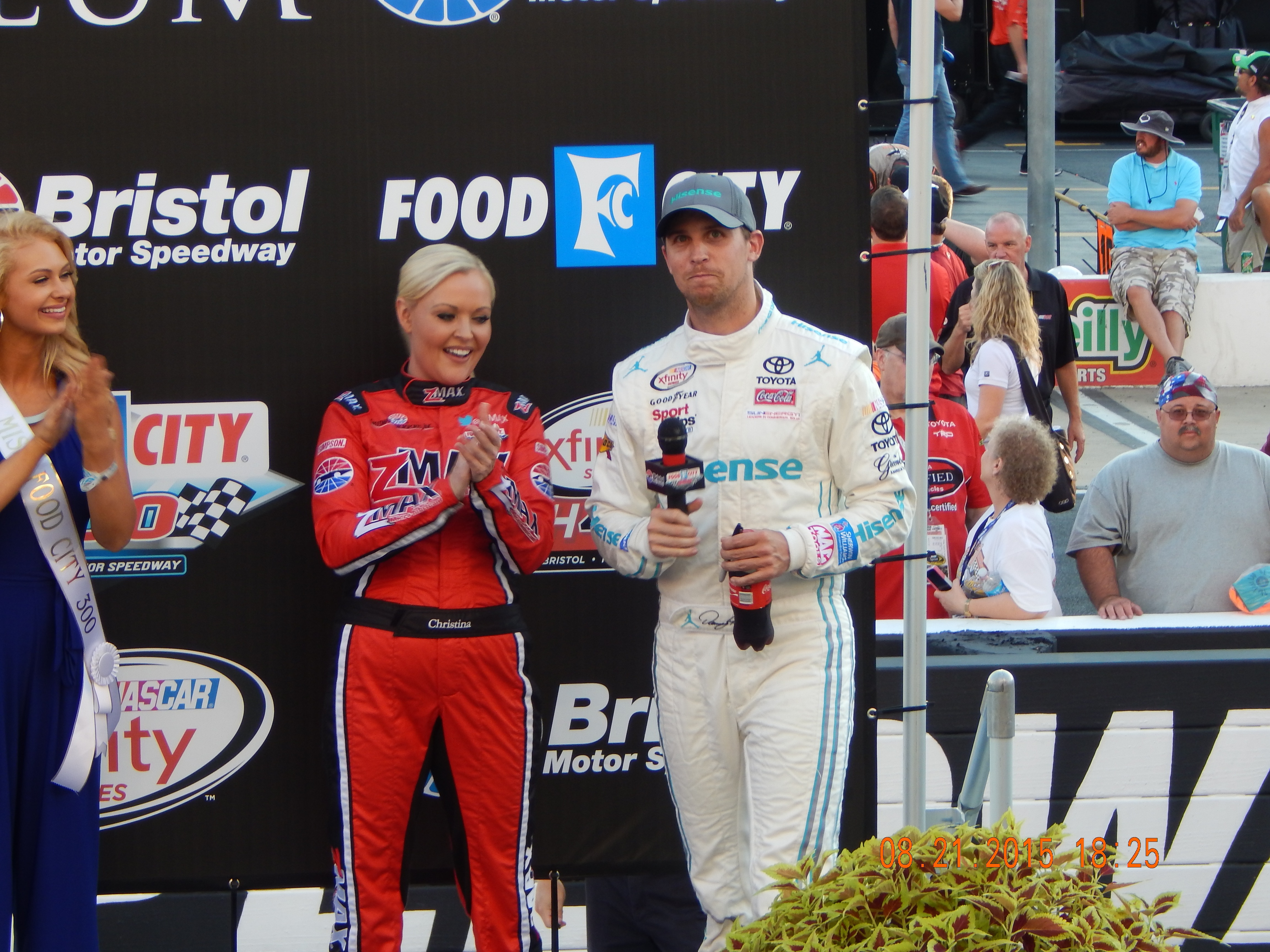
Hamlin at Bristol Motor Speedway for the Food City 300

In 2015, Hamlin began the season by starting at the rear of the field in the Budweiser Duels due to a penalty received during Daytona 500 qualifying. In the Daytona 500, he came close to winning for the second consecutive year, finishing 4th and showcasing one of the best cars throughout Speedweeks. However, at Atlanta, Hamlin finished 38th after being involved in a wreck with 42 laps remaining. He rebounded at Las Vegas, finishing 5th, but struggled at Phoenix, where he ended up in 24th place.

At California, Hamlin had one of the best cars on the track, leading 56 laps, second only to Kurt Busch's 61 laps. However, a poor pit stop and a subsequent bad restart dropped Hamlin to thirteenth place. He managed to rebound to third with twenty laps to go, but his chances of winning were dashed when he was penalized for an uncontrolled tire during a pit stop, forcing him to the tail end of the longest line. He restarted in 29th and ultimately finished the race in 28th place.

At Martinsville, Hamlin consistently stayed within the top ten throughout the race. However, he was penalized for an uncontrolled tire late in the race, forcing him to the back of the field in 31st place. Despite this setback, he made an impressive comeback, re-entering the top ten just fifty laps later. Following a strong restart with less than thirty laps remaining, Hamlin secured his victory after fending off a challenge from rival Brad Keselowski. He edged Keselowski at the finish line by just 0.3 seconds (one car length), marking his fifth victory at Martinsville, where he led a total of 91 laps. Hamlin, who had a history of feuding with Keselowski during the 2014 Bank of America 500, praised him for not wrecking him to win the race.

During the Bristol spring race, Hamlin was replaced by Erik Jones after 22 laps due to neck spasms. in May, Hamlin secured victory in the Sprint All-Star Race by beating Brad Keselowski off pit road during the final stops. This win marked Hamlin's first All-Star victory, as well as the inaugural All-Star win for both Joe Gibbs Racing and Toyota.

Hamlin tore his anterior cruciate ligament (ACL) while playing basketball for the second time in his career in September and had surgery after the season ended.

After qualifying for the Chase for the NASCAR Sprint Cup, Denny Hamlin won the opening race at Chicagoland Speedway, securing his spot in the second round. However, during the next round at Talladega, his car roof hatch on Denny Hamlin's car came loose on lap 84 and he was forced to make an unscheduled stop to tape down the hatch. His car was involved in "The Big One," resulting in a crash and fire. This incident ultimately eliminated him from the Chase due to insufficient points to advance.

==== 2016: First Daytona 500 Win ====
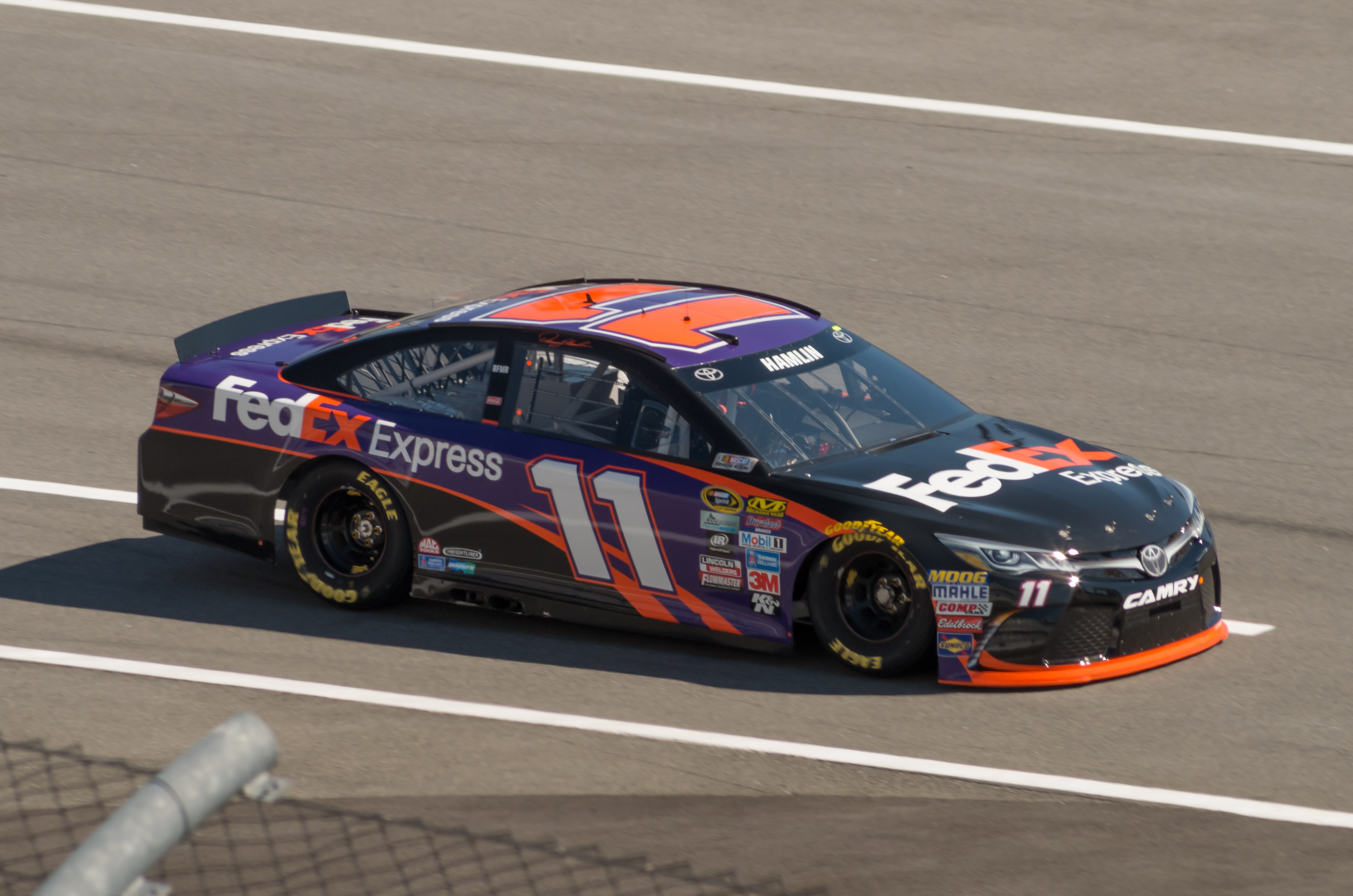
Hamlin's 2016 Daytona 500 race-winning car

In 2016, With new crew chief Mike Wheeler replacing Dave Rogers, Hamlin won the Sprint Unlimited. In the Daytona 500, he passed his Joe Gibbs Racing teammate Matt Kenseth for the lead on the final lap. Hamlin and Martin Truex Jr. raced side by side for the win as they crossed the start-finish line, with Hamlin—who led a race-high 95 laps—prevailing by just 0.011 seconds over Truex. This marked the closest finish in Daytona 500 history and gave team owner Joe Gibbs his first victory in the event since 1993. However, at Martinsville, Hamlin was running well until he wrecked after hitting the curb and slamming into the wall, finishing 39th. He also experienced further wrecks at Kansas and Dover.

Hamlin competed in both the Cup and Xfinity races during the Coca-Cola 600 weekend, winning the Xfinity race and finishing fourth in the main Cup event. At Michigan, he suffered a blown tire with twelve laps to go. During the Sonoma race, he led Tony Stewart late but misjudged his entry into the final corner, which nearly resulted in contact with Stewart, causing him to lose the lead and the race. Amid accusations that he intentionally let Stewart win in his final season, Hamlin clarified that it was a mistake on his part. However, he rebounded in the season's other road race at Watkins Glen, managing his fuel effectively—helped by two red flags and eight cautions—to secure his first road course win.

He secured a third win in the final race of the regular season at Richmond, starting from the pole and holding off Truex and Kyle Larson for the victory. However, his championship hopes were affected when his engine failed with 26 laps remaining at Charlotte, ultimately resulting in a sixth-place finish in the points standings.

==== 2017: 2 win season and first feud with Chase Elliott ====
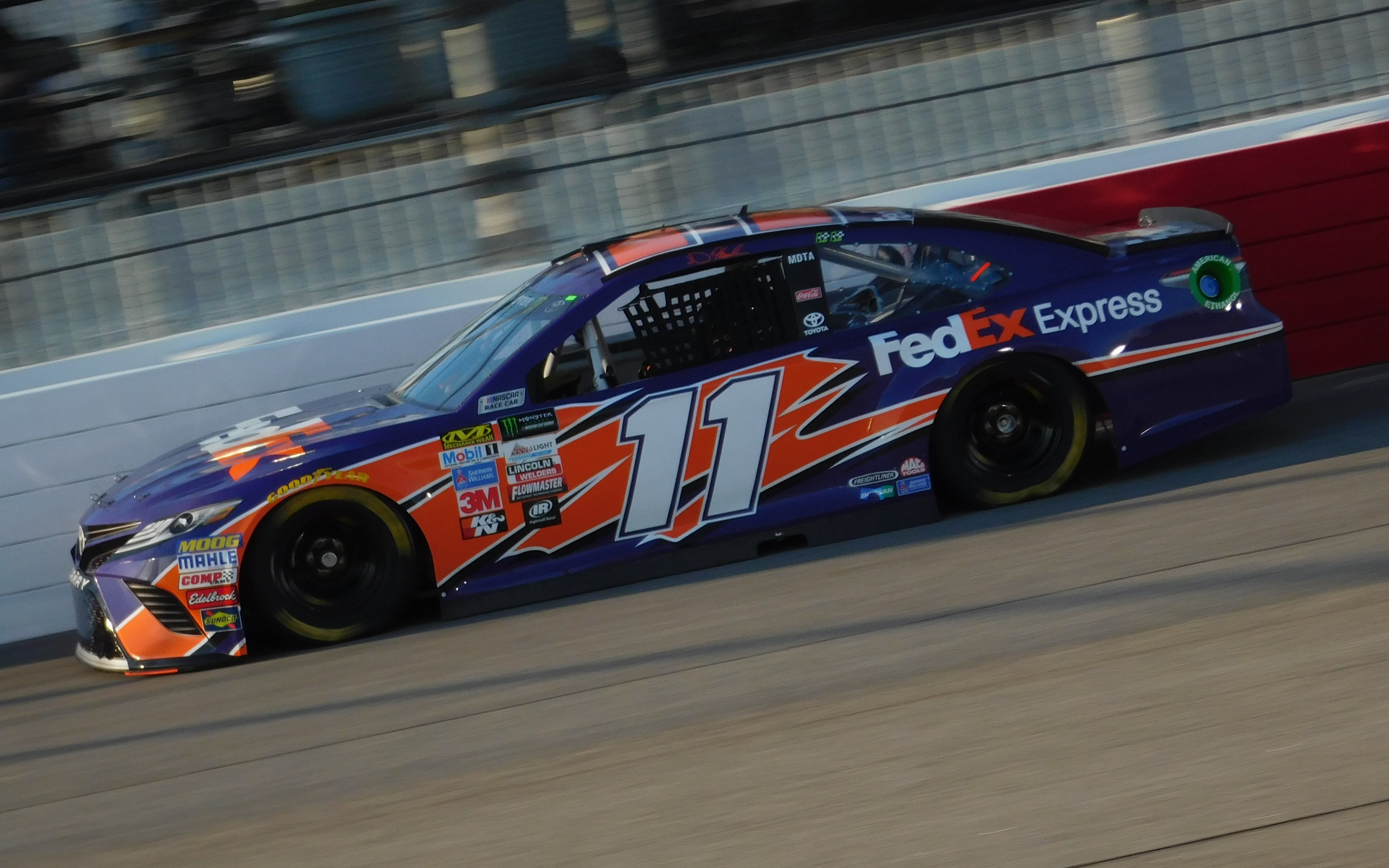
Hamlin at Richmond Raceway in 2017

In 2017, Hamlin had a challenging start to the season, which featured significant changes, including the introduction of stage racing. He secured an eighth place finish in Stage 1 of the Daytona 500 but was involved in a major crash at the end of Stage 2, triggered by a tire blowout on Kyle Busch's No. 18 Toyota Camry, ultimately finishing seventeenth. The difficulties continued with a disappointing race in Atlanta, where mechanical failures forced him to retire, resulting in a 38th place classification.

Hamlin rebounded with a sixth-place finish in Las Vegas, followed by another top-ten result in Phoenix. At the STP 500 in Martinsville, a track where he is a five-time winner, he placed second in Stage 1 but was set back by poor pit strategy and a subsequent wreck, finishing the race in 30th.

Hamlin's Toyota improved significantly after a mediocre performance at Texas. Combining the newfound speed of his JGR car with his exceptional short-track talent, he secured two 8th-place finishes in stages 1 and 2 at Bristol. He even led a dozen laps late in the race before being overtaken by Jimmie Johnson in the final stage, ultimately finishing tenth. At his home track in Richmond, another short track, he led fifty laps and made a brilliant move past Brad Keselowski from 2nd place on the sixth restart, earning a 3rd-place finish along with valuable stage points from both stages.

Hamlin's exceptional skills on restrictor-plate tracks were evident at Talladega. He used strategic pit stops to secure his first stage win of the year in Stage 2 and led more laps than any other driver. Despite his strong performance, he fell back late in the race and missed the victory. At the Coca-Cola 600 in Charlotte, he claimed his second stage win in Stage 3, leading the final ten laps of that segment. Although a poor restart from the front dropped him to 10th at the beginning of the final stage, Hamlin worked his way back through the field to finish fifth, earning valuable points in the standings.

Hamlin secured a solid 8th-place finish at a crash-filled Dover race, despite being penalized for an uncontrolled tire in Stage 1. He followed up with a strong performance at Pocono, running well throughout but dropping back late to finish 12th. At Michigan, Hamlin battled intensely with Kyle Larson on the final restart and finished fourth.

Returning to Sonoma, the site of his memorable 2016 duel with Tony Stewart, Hamlin put on an impressive performance. He led twelve laps during Stage 2 and stayed in the top two for most of the race. However, as his tires lost grip late, he fell from second to fourth place, losing positions to Clint Bowyer with six laps to go and Brad Keselowski on the final lap. The race ended under caution after Kasey Kahne crashed on the front straight, with Hamlin finishing 4th overall, adding to his 5th and 4th place finishes in the earlier race stages.

At Daytona the following week, Hamlin had a strong performance, leading sixteen laps during Stage 2 and finishing a close second to teammate Matt Kenseth in that stage. However, his race ended in frustration when he got caught up in a three-car incident with three laps remaining while running seventh. As he attempted to get moving again, his car erupted into flames, forcing an early retirement and marking his second DNF of the year.

The next race in Kentucky resulted in another strong top-five performance for Hamlin, with finishes of fourth and fifth in the stages and 4th overall. The following week, he finally broke through. Starting 8th on the grid in New Hampshire, Hamlin finished ninth and second in the stages before leading 52 laps on his way to victory. This win marked his 30th career NASCAR Cup Series victory, his third Cup win at Loudon, and Joe Gibbs Racing's first victory of the 2017 season.

A dismal race in Indianapolis followed, where a blown tire in overtime cost Hamlin a top-five result, leaving him to finish seventeenth. He rebounded at the Overton's 400 in Pocono, returning to the top 5. The race centered around four main contenders: Hamlin, Kyle Busch, Martin Truex Jr., and Kevin Harvick. Hamlin led 18 laps and looked like a strong contender for his second win of the season, ultimately finishing fourth. Busch claimed victory, signaling that JGR was back to its usual competitive form. Hamlin continued his strong performance the following week, finishing fourth at Watkins Glen, where he had earned his first road course win the previous year.

Heading into the next race at Michigan, Hamlin's long-time partner, Jordan Fish, was close to the end of her pregnancy, with their baby due at any moment. As a precaution, Christopher Bell ran practice laps in Hamlin's No. 11 Toyota, ready to step in if Fish went into labor during the weekend. However, she did not. The team took a bold strategy, staying out on old tires and hoping for a caution, but it didn't work out as planned. Hamlin had to pit with eleven laps remaining, and the caution he needed came just two laps later, resulting in a 16th-place finish.

Hamlin secured a third-place finish at the Bristol night race after a consistent performance. The following week at Darlington, he dominated both the Xfinity and Cup races. In the Xfinity race on Saturday, Hamlin outdueled Joey Logano, executing a crossover move in the last corner to cut underneath and take the win. In the Cup race, Hamlin's 'Flying 11' proved to be the most consistent and fastest car, leading 124 of the 367 laps en route to victory. Despite a late pit-road mistake, he claimed his second win of the season. However, both wins were deemed "encumbered" after NASCAR found an illegal rear suspension component during a post-race inspection. As a result, Hamlin was docked 25 points, and his crew chief, Mike Wheeler, was fined $50,000 and suspended for two races. This Cup Series victory would mark Hamlin's last until the 2019 Daytona 500, 47 races later.

The final race of the regular season at Richmond resulted in another top-five finish for the No. 11 car, but it could have been even better. In overtime, on the final lap, Hamlin attempted to pass Martin Truex Jr. for second place but slid his tires, which caused him to collect Truex and send him into the outside wall. Hamlin ultimately recovered to finish fifth and later apologized to the 2017 regular-season champion.

Hamlin's playoffs started strong with a fourth place finish, adding to his impressive consistency; his average finish over the last ten races was sixth, the best in the field. This solid performance positioned him well for the second playoff race at New Hampshire, a track where he had previously won three times, including once earlier in the summer. However, he finished twelfth this time after a relatively average race. At Dover, Hamlin managed to earn stage points to secure a spot in the Round of 12 but was forced to retire with less than 30 laps remaining due to a broken axle.

The Round of 12 started strong for Hamlin, as he secured his first pole of the season for the Charlotte. He ran near the front throughout the race, collecting valuable stage points and finishing fourth. This result placed him 5th in the standings, thirteen points above the cutoff line heading into Talladega.

Hamlin entered the Round of 8 with controversy following a race at Martinsville, where, with just three laps remaining, he bumped Chase Elliott in a turn, causing Elliott to spin out. Many fans believed the incident was intentional, as they booed Hamlin during his post-race interview. "I got into the back of him, and he spun out," Hamlin told NBCSN. "I was trying to get a race win... everybody was doing the same thing. I hate it for his team. I understand they've been waiting for a win for a long time, but this is for a ticket to Homestead."

At Phoenix, Hamlin appeared to be on track for a Championship 4 spot after collecting nineteen stage points and a stage win. However, his hopes were dashed when he slammed the wall with under 45 laps remaining following contact from Elliott, ultimately preventing him from advancing to the final round.

==== 2018: First Winless Season ====
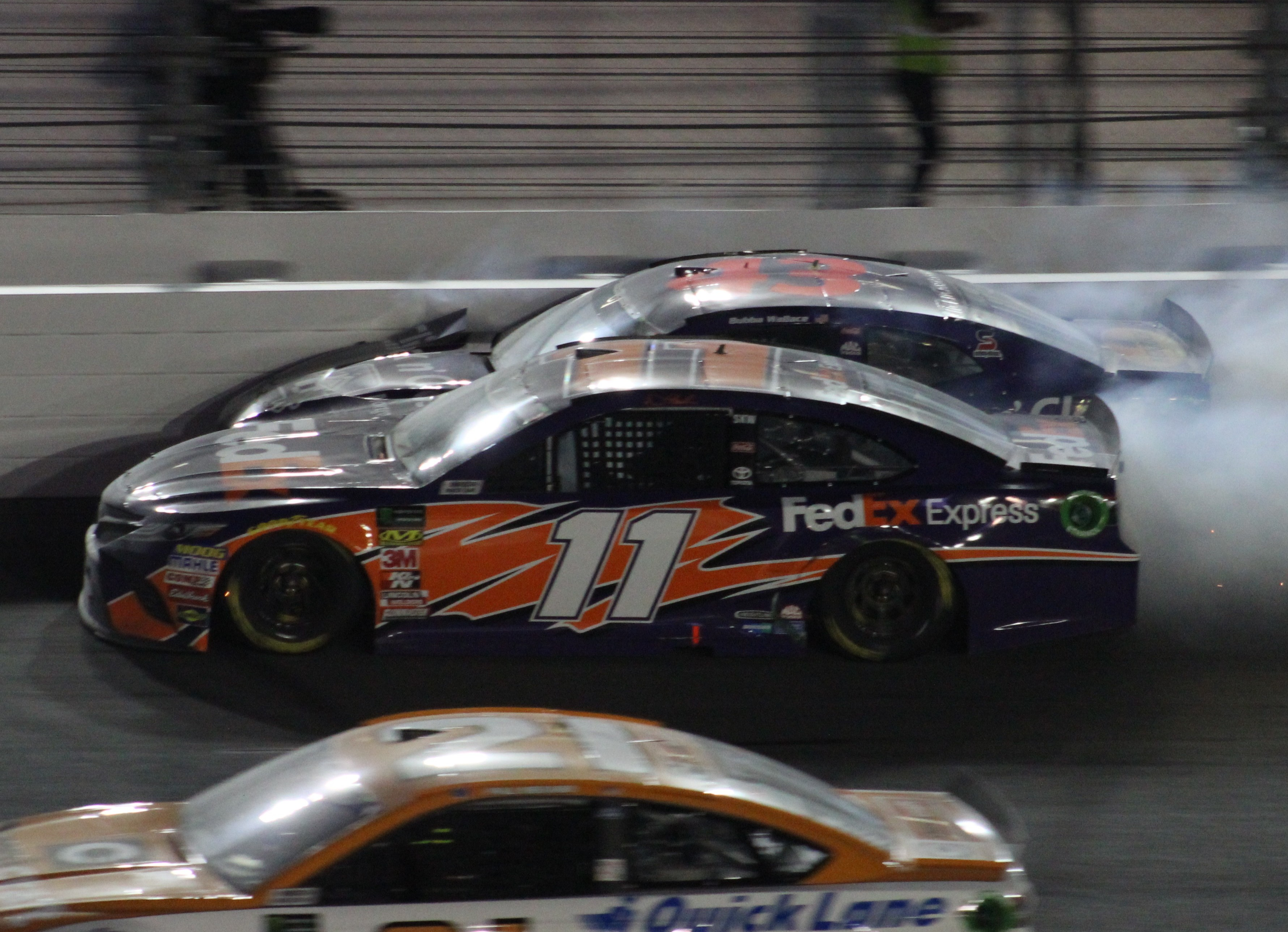
Hamlin battling Bubba Wallace for second at the 2018 Daytona 500

In 2018, Denny Hamlin began the season with a third place finish at the Daytona 500. Despite not winning any races during the regular season, he secured a playoff spot by maintaining consistency, achieving seven top-five finishes and fourteen top-tens. However, Hamlin was eliminated in the Round of 16 after finishing outside the top-ten at Las Vegas, Richmond, and the Charlotte Roval. He ended the season in eleventh place in the final point standings, marking his first time outside the top ten since 2013, when he missed four races due to injury. This was also the first season in his career without a victory, ending a twelve-season streak of winning at least one race, which dated back to his rookie year in 2006 when he won both Pocono races, up until his victory at New Hampshire in July and his second Southern 500 win in 2017.

==== 2019: Return to the Championship 4 and 2nd Daytona 500 ====
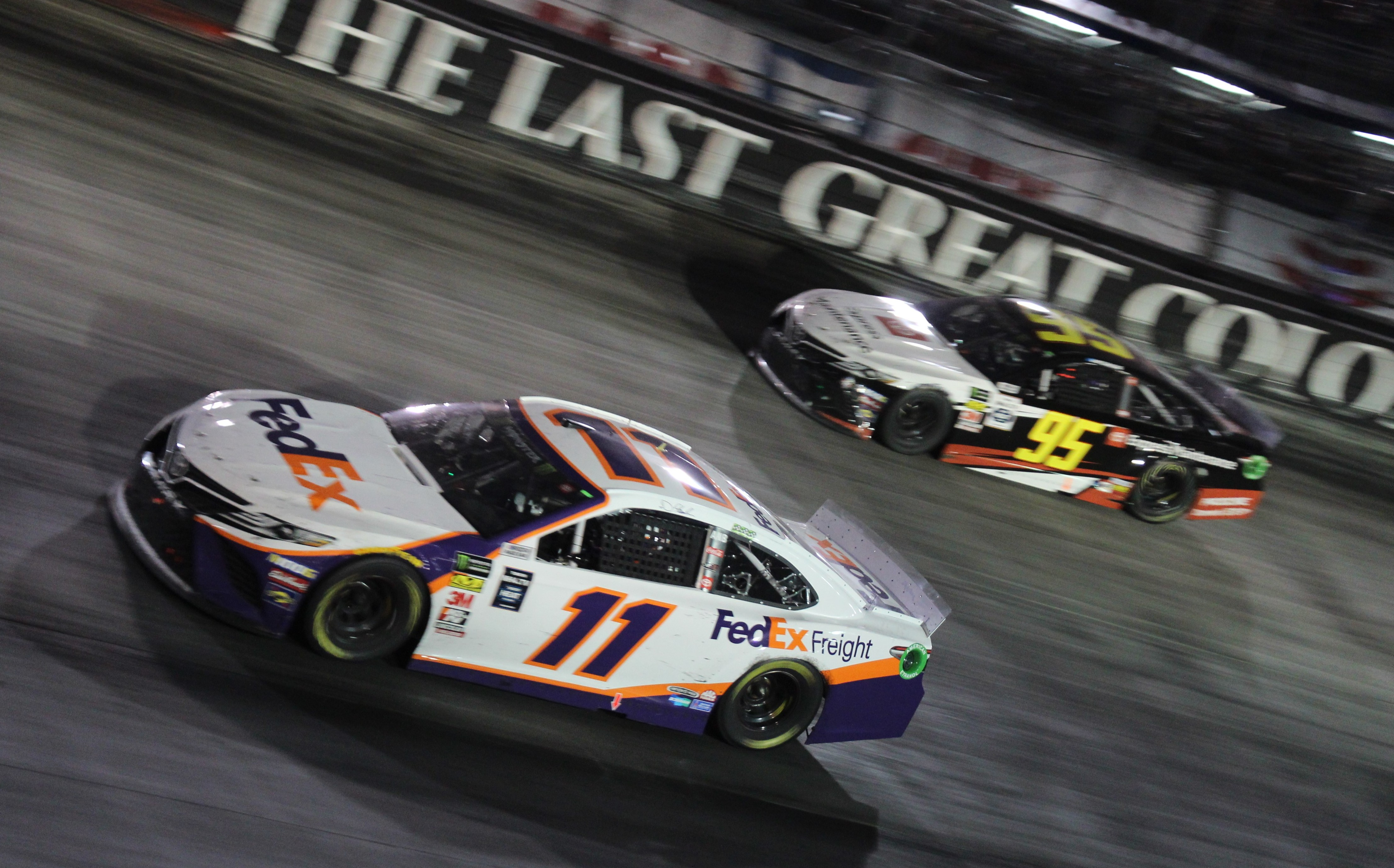
Hamlin before winning the 2019 Bass Pro Shops NRA Night Race

In 2019, Denny Hamlin began the season by breaking a 47-race winless streak with his second Daytona 500 victory, marking his first Cup Series win with new crew chief Chris Gabehart, who had replaced Mike Wheeler. Hamlin dedicated the win to the late J.D. Gibbs. He earned his second win of the season at Texas and followed up with victories at Pocono and the Bristol Night Race. However, during the spring race at Dover, Hamlin was rushed to the infield care center after carbon monoxide poisoning, caused by an accident that knocked out his car's right rear crush panel and allowed fumes into the cabin. Despite this setback, he remained consistent through the regular season. A 19th-place finish at the Charlotte Roval didn't stop him from advancing to the Round of 12.

At Martinsville, Hamlin collided with Joey Logano in turn four, forcing Logano into the outside wall. Logano would lose a tire and spin out two laps later. Hamlin finished fourth while Logano salvaged an eighth place result. After the race, the two drivers discussed the incident, which escalated when Logano slapped Hamlin's right shoulder, sparking a brief altercation. NASCAR responded by suspending the No. 22 team's tire technician, Dave Nichols Jr., for one race for pulling Hamlin to the ground during the incident.

On November 1, Hamlin announced that he had a torn Glenoid labrum in his left shoulder, which he planned to have surgically repaired after the 2019 season. Despite the injury, he excelled during the Playoffs, securing his fifth win of the season at Kansas just two weeks earlier. He then advanced to the Championship 4 for the first time since 2014, achieving his sixth win of the year at Phoenix—his second career victory at that track since 2012. It also marked the second season in his career with at least six wins, the first being in 2010 when he had eight.

At Homestead, Hamlin started from the pole but struggled to contend for the win or the Championship. He led only two laps, dealt with overheating issues after a gamble with extra nose tape, and made an unscheduled pit stop. He managed to recover from being a lap down to finish tenth. Hamlin ended the season fourth in points, a significant improvement of seven positions from the previous year, and recorded six wins after going winless the prior season, all in his first year with Gabehart as crew chief.

In the Xfinity Series, Hamlin initially won the Darlington race but was disqualified after his car failed to meet the height requirements during the post-race inspection. Consequently, Cole Custer, who finished second, was declared the official race winner.

==== 2020: Third Championship 4 Appearance and back to back Daytona 500 wins ====
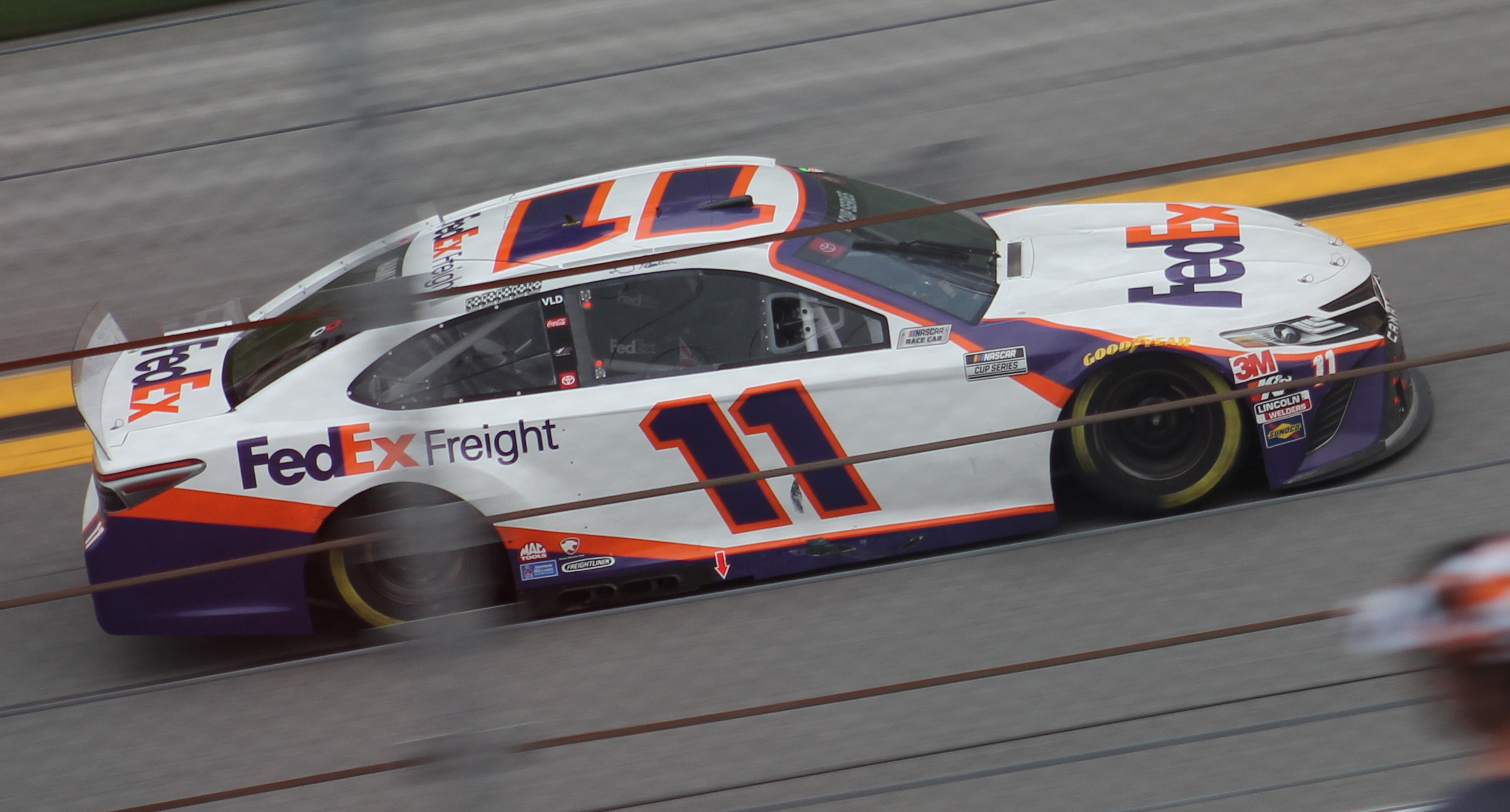
Hamlin at Daytona in 2020

In 2020, Hamlin won his third Daytona 500, edging out Ryan Blaney by just 0.014 seconds in overtime, marking the second-closest finish in the race's history, only surpassed by Hamlin's 2016 win. However, the victory was overshadowed by a severe crash involving Ryan Newman at the finish line. Newman's wreck led to his hospitalization, and controversy arose over Hamlin's post-race burnouts while Newman's condition was still unknown. Both Hamlin and team owner Joe Gibbs later apologized, with Hamlin explaining that he was unaware of Newman's status until he reached Victory Lane.

He dominated in wins at Darlington, Homestead, Pocono, and Kansas. At Homestead, he started on the pole, won both stages, and ultimately claimed victory, earning a perfect sixty points in the standings. At Pocono, he finished second in the first race of the doubleheader, just behind a slower Kevin Harvick. However, he came back to win the second race, strategically staying out late in the pit cycle, pitting under green, and maintaining the lead afterward.

After his win at Kansas, he led the series with five victories. Alongside crew chief Chris Gabehart, they were consistently the team to beat. With his win at Pocono, Hamlin surpassed Mark Martin for the second-most wins by a driver who had never won a championship. That fall, he secured the YellaWood 500 at Talladega in a photo finish over Matt DiBenedetto. The victory, however, was controversial, as Hamlin had gone below the yellow line on the final lap.

==== 2021: Fourth Championship 4 Appearance ====
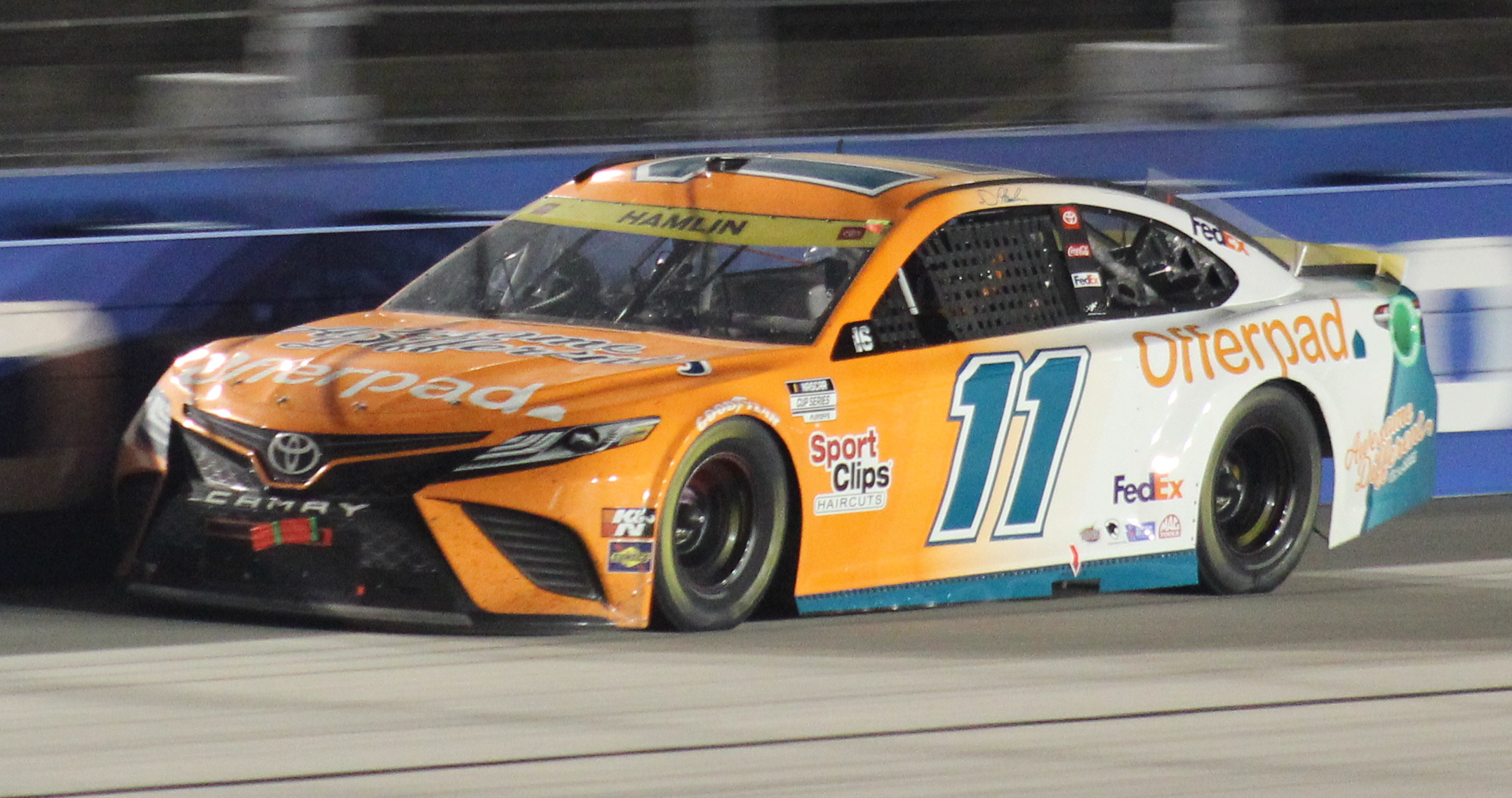
Hamlin's race-winning car during the Southern 500

In 2021, Hamlin secured a Playoff berth despite not winning any races during the Regular Season. He finished 23rd at the Verizon 200 at the Brickyard after being spun out by a penalized Chase Briscoe while leading during a Green-White-Checkered attempt. Part-time Cup driver A. J. Allmendinger won the race, ensuring Hamlin clinched the 16th and final Playoff spot, even if he remained winless. After the race, Hamlin criticized NASCAR's decision to use the road-course layout at Indianapolis instead of the track's iconic oval.

On September 5, 2021, Hamlin won the Southern 500 at Darlington for the third time in his career, securing a spot in the Round of 12 in the Playoffs. Three weeks later, Hamlin earned his second victory of the season at Las Vegas, marking his first career win at the track and advancing to the Round of 8.

During the Xfinity 500 at Martinsville, the penultimate race of the season, Hamlin was leading with seven laps to go while battling Alex Bowman, who had already been eliminated from the Playoffs in the previous round. Bowman made contact with Hamlin's left rear, causing Hamlin to spin in Turn 3 and bringing out a caution. Bowman went on to win the race, while Hamlin finished 24th but still managed to advance to the Championship 4. After the race, as Bowman was preparing to celebrate with burnouts, Hamlin pulled up in front of him, appearing to block his celebration. Hamlin then drove into the front of Bowman's car, pushing it and giving Bowman the middle finger before heading to pit road. In his post-race interview, Hamlin called Bowman "an absolute hack" and said, "he's fucking terrible."

Despite the incident, Hamlin made it to the Championship 4 for the third consecutive year, finishing third in the final standings. He ended the season with two wins, nineteen top-five finishes, 25 top-ten finishes, 1,502 laps led, an average finish of 8.4, and zero DNFs.

==== 2022: First Feud with Ross Chastain and First Failure to reach Championship 4 ====
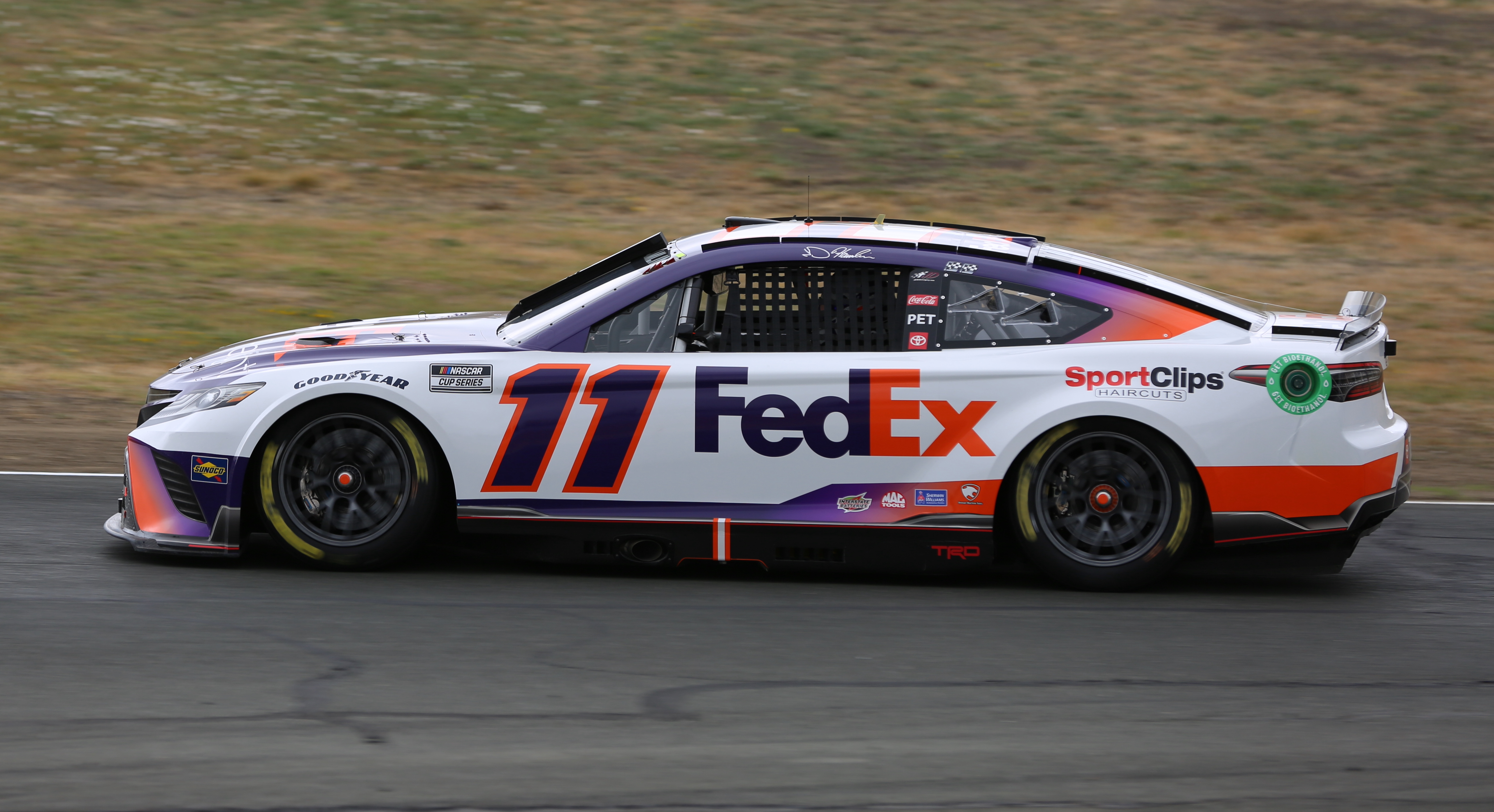
Hamlin's No. 11 car at Sonoma Raceway in 2022

In 2022, Hamlin began the season with a 37th-place finish at the Daytona 500. Although he secured a win at Richmond, he faced challenges in the first 12 races, managing only four top-20 finishes and recording four DNFs. On May 3, 2022, Gabehart received a four-race suspension following a tire and wheel loss at Dover.

On April 26, NASCAR announced that Hamlin would be required to attend sensitivity training following a controversial tweet. The tweet, posted on April 25, mocked Kyle Larson's block on Kurt Busch during the final lap of the GEICO 500 by using a Family Guy clip. The clip depicted an Asian woman driving poorly, failing to use turn signals and causing a major accident. The tweet drew backlash, especially because Larson is Japanese American. Hamlin deleted the tweet the same day and issued an apology: "I took down a post I made earlier today after reading some of the [replies]. It was a poor choice of memes and I saw how it was offensive. It came across totally wrong. I apologize."

Hamlin's 2022 season had several noteworthy moments. He secured his second win at the Coca-Cola 600 but became more known for his ongoing feud with Ross Chastain. Their rivalry began during the Enjoy Illinois 300 at Gateway, when Chastain bumped Hamlin, sending him into the wall and ending his race. In response, Hamlin repeatedly slowed down in front of Chastain, with NASCAR eventually stepping in and stating that Hamlin had "made his point." Later in the same race, after Chastain had an incident with Chase Elliott, Elliott forced Chastain into the wall on a restart. Hamlin joined in by continuing to obstruct Chastain before ultimately allowing him to pass.

Hamlin won at Pocono but was disqualified after post-race inspections revealed an unauthorized modification to the car's front fascia (along with his teammate Kyle Busch, who finished second and was penalized for the same infraction). Specifically, clear vinyl had been left on the lower corners and wheel openings before the paint scheme wrap was applied, creating slight dimensional irregularities. This marked the first time a NASCAR Cup Series winner had been disqualified since 1960, when Emanuel Zervakis lost a victory due to an oversized fuel tank.

Hamlin was eliminated from championship contention after the Round of 8. At Martinsville, Chastain executed a remarkable move by riding the outside wall to overtake Hamlin for the final Championship 4 spot, pushing Hamlin out of the season finale contention for the first time since 2018. Hamlin finished the season fifth in the points standings.

==== 2023: Second Failure to reach Championship 4 ====
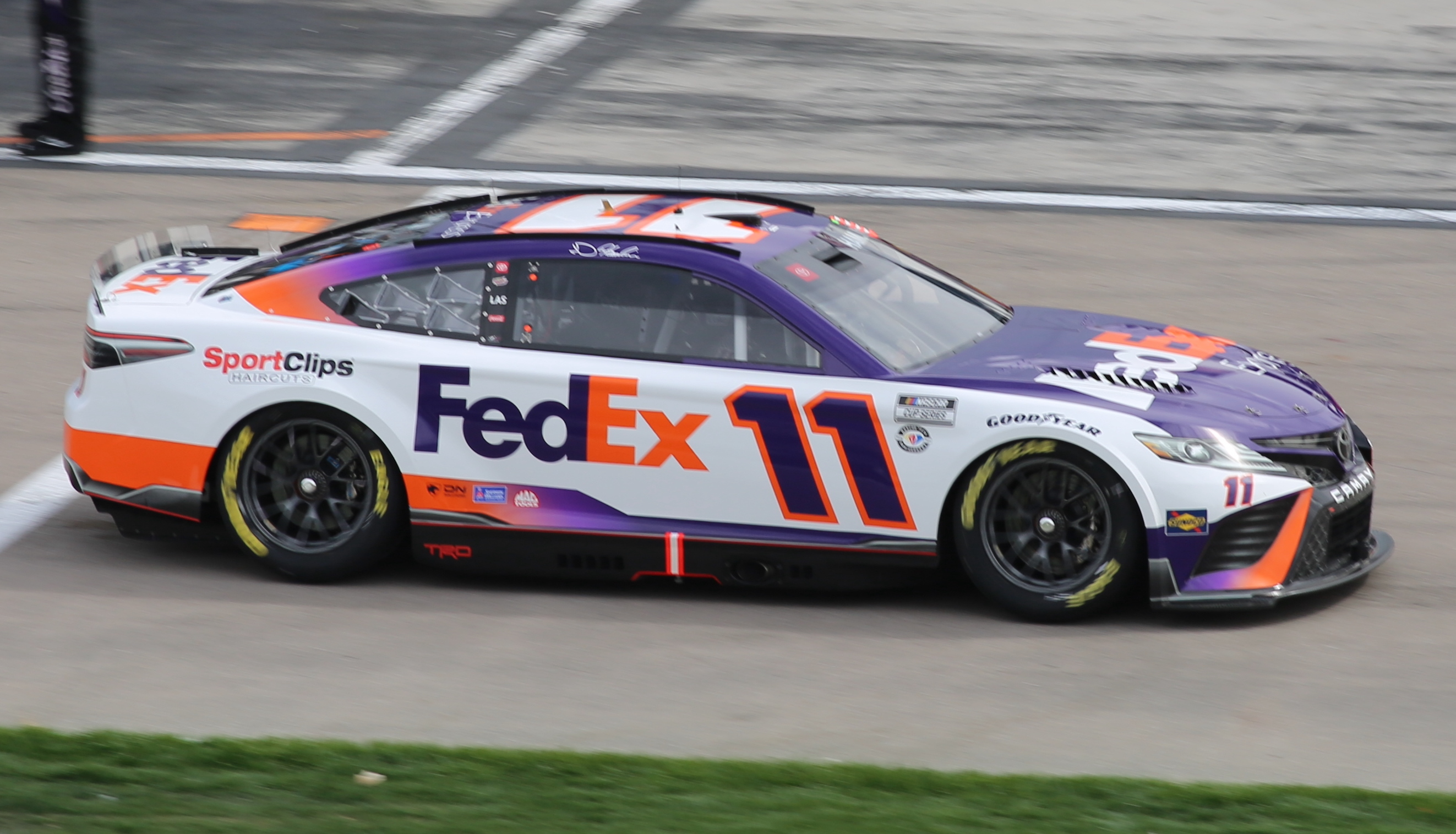
Hamlin's car at Las Vegas Motor Speedway in 2023

In 2023, Hamlin began the season with a 17th-place finish at the Daytona 500. On March 15, he was docked 25 points and fined $50,000 after admitting on his podcast Actions Detrimental that he had intentionally wrecked Ross Chastain during the closing laps of the Phoenix race.

In April, Hamlin was named one of NASCAR's 75 Greatest Drivers. He secured a victory at Kansas after a tense battle with Kyle Larson, who hit the outside wall on the final lap, allowing Hamlin to pass for the win. This victory marked Joe Gibbs Racing's 400th career win. At Charlotte, Hamlin was right-rear hooked into the outside wall by Chase Elliott, leading to Elliott's one-race suspension.

On July 23, Hamlin earned his second win of the season at Pocono, his seventh career victory at the track, breaking Jeff Gordon's record. This win was also Hamlin's 50th career Cup Series victory and marked Toyota's 600th overall win. Additionally, it was the first win for sponsor Mavis Tires, who had just started sponsoring him at New Hampshire the previous week.

During the playoffs, Hamlin advanced to the Round of 12 with a victory at Bristol. This win surpassed Junior Johnson's record for the most wins by a driver without a championship. Hamlin finished the season with 19 top-ten finishes, 14 top-five finishes, and three wins (Kansas, Pocono, and Bristol), placing fifth in the standings for the second consecutive year.

Hamlin returned to the Xfinity Series in 2023 after a two-year hiatus, driving Joe Gibbs Racing's No. 19 car to victory at Darlington in September. He had planned to participate in the race in 2022 but withdrew to recover from a crash in the previous week's Cup Series race at Daytona, ensuring he was ready for the Cup Series playoff opener the next day.

==== 2024: Third Failure to reach Championship 4 ====
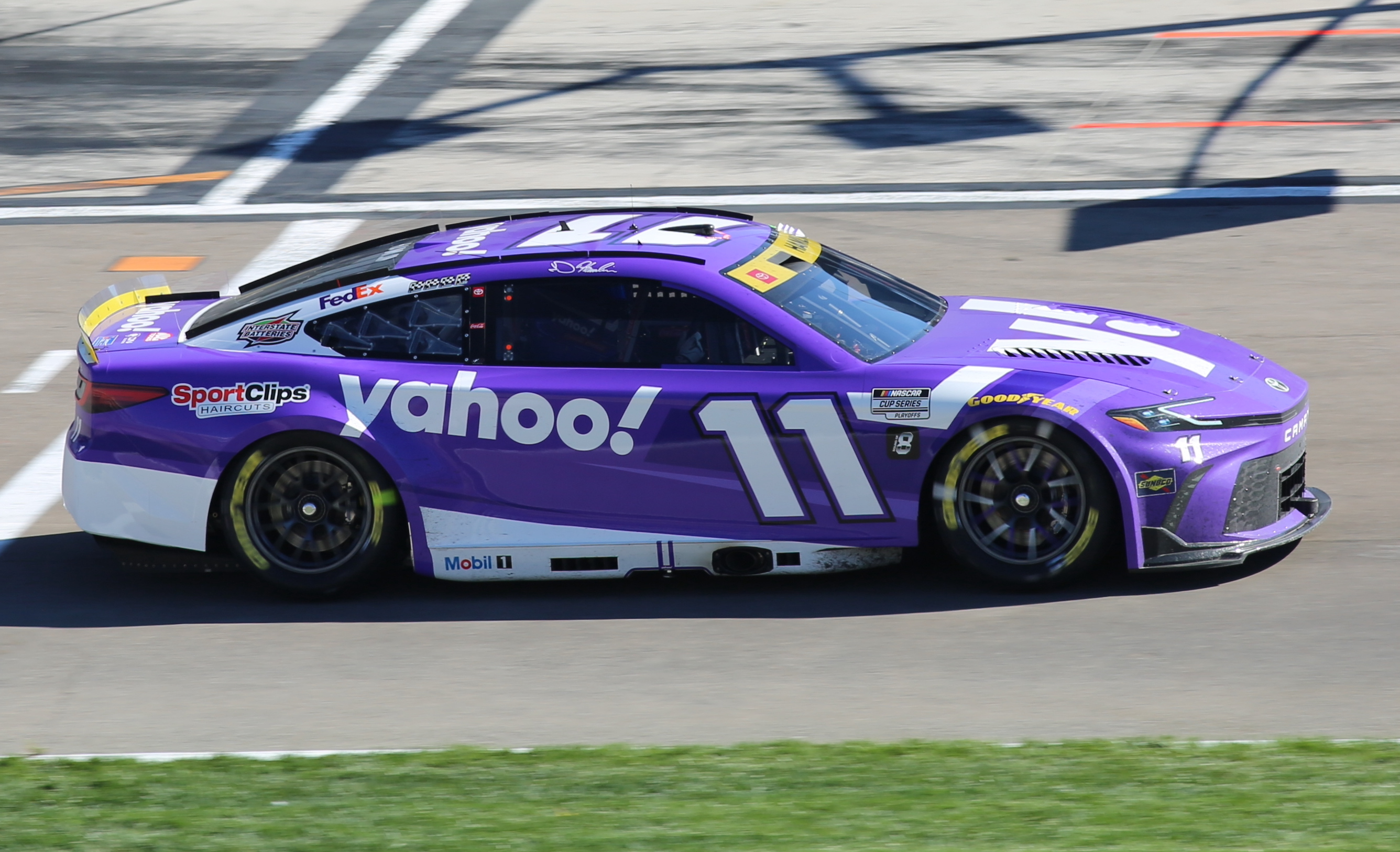
Hamlin's car at Las Vegas Motor Speedway in 2024

In 2024, Hamlin kicked off the season with a win at the Busch Light Clash at the Coliseum. At the Daytona 500, he got caught in a wreck with William Byron. Hamlin went off and finished nineteenth, while Byron went on to win the race. Hamlin secured his first pole of the season at Phoenix, but spun out late while racing Tyler Reddick for the lead in the third stage. He recovered to finish eleventh. The following week, he claimed his first win of the season at Bristol, which marked the first spring race on the concrete track since 2020. This race sparked controversy due to significant tire wear, likely caused by a strip of resin applied to the racing groove and cooler temperatures that hindered the track from taking rubber. (However, on August 22, the No. 11 team faced an L2 penalty following an engine inspection violation. Toyota Racing Development admitted that the race-winning engine from Bristol had been rebuilt instead of inspected by NASCAR, resulting in a 75-point penalty for both the driver and team, along with a $100,000 fine for crew chief Chris Gabehart.)

Two weeks later, Hamlin triumphed again at Richmond in an overtime finish, aided by his pit crew's strong performance. However, controversy surrounded the restart, as Hamlin appeared to accelerate before the restart line alongside Martin Truex Jr. NASCAR deemed the restart clean, and Hamlin was declared the winner. He led 17 laps, continuing his streak of leading at least one lap in all seven races to start the season. A month later, Hamlin won at Dover. During Martinsville practice, Hamlin backed his car into the wall due to a stuck throttle. Despite the repairs, he finished fifth in the race but didn't accumulate enough points to advance, marking his third consecutive year missing the final four and elimination in the Round of 8 during the playoffs. Hamlin finished eighth in the points standings for the season. At the conclusion of the year, it was announced that FedEx would not return as the sponsor of the No. 11 car in 2025, ending a 20-year partnership with JGR. On November 22, JGR promoted Chris Gabehart to competition director, while Chris Gayle was named the new crew chief for the No. 11 car starting in 2025.

==== 2025: 11 Against the World and second runner-up finish in season standings ====
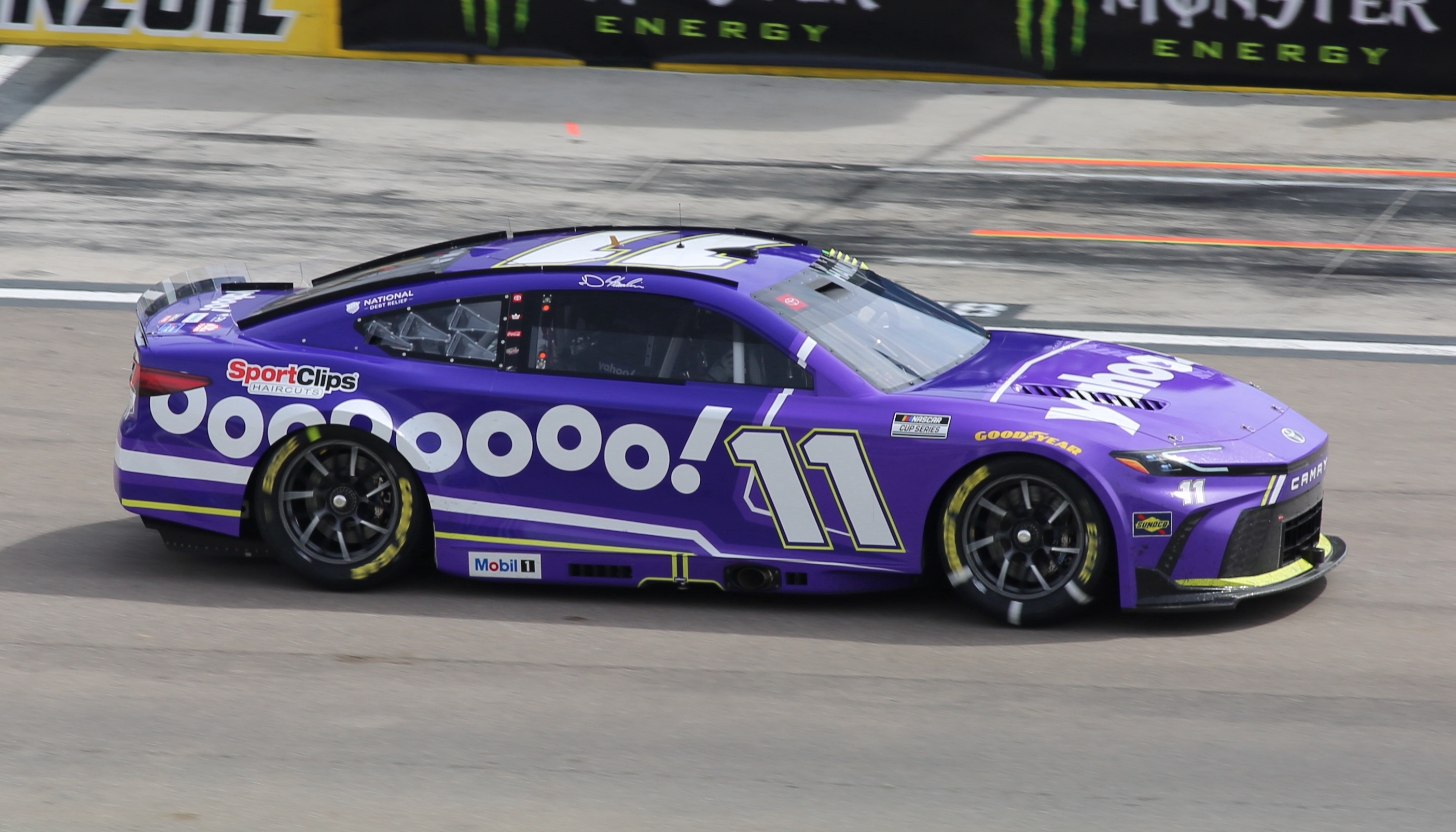
Hamlin's car at Las Vegas Motor Speedway in 2025

Hamlin started the 2025 season leading on the final lap of the Daytona 500 before being wrecked on the backstretch handing him a 24th place finish. He was then involved in the second closest finish ever at Phoenix, coming off second to teammate Christopher Bell. On March 18, Progressive Insurance signed a deal to be the primary sponsor of the No. 11 car for 18 races during the season. Later that month, Hamlin won at Martinsville, his first win at the track in a decade. Upon his win, Hamlin waved a flag that read: "11 against the world", a nod to the Ohio State Buckeyes and a reference to his involvement in 23XI Racing and Front Row Motorsports' antitrust lawsuit against NASCAR. During the season, he also scored wins at Darlington and Michigan. On June 12, Hamlin announced that he would miss the Mexico City race due to the birth of his son, ending his 406 consecutive race start streak that began in 2014. Despite missing the race, NASCAR granted Hamlin a waiver a day later, keeping his playoff eligibility alive. Hamlin earned his first pole of the season at Pocono, his 44th career and his most at the track. He went on to win his fourth race of the season at Dover; his most since 2020. During the playoffs, Hamlin won at St. Louis to advance to the Round of 12. At New Hampshire, Hamlin spun out his teammate Ty Gibbs as they both battled for position. The following week at Kansas, controversy surrounding Hamlin arose after he promptly put his 23XI driver Bubba Wallace into the wall on the final lap of the race, costing both of them a win. Hamlin later locked himself into the Championship 4 with a win at Las Vegas, securing his 60th career win, and sixth win of the 2025 season, tying himself with his 2019 season. Hamlin came into the final race of the 2025 season at Phoenix Raceway, qualifying in pole position for the race. Hamlin led 208 laps throughout the race until a caution came out with four laps to go in the race. After pit stops, Hamlin restarted in overtime in tenth place. Hamlin finished the race in sixth, coming in second to Kyle Larson in the Playoffs.

==== 2026: Summer win streak; chase struggles ====
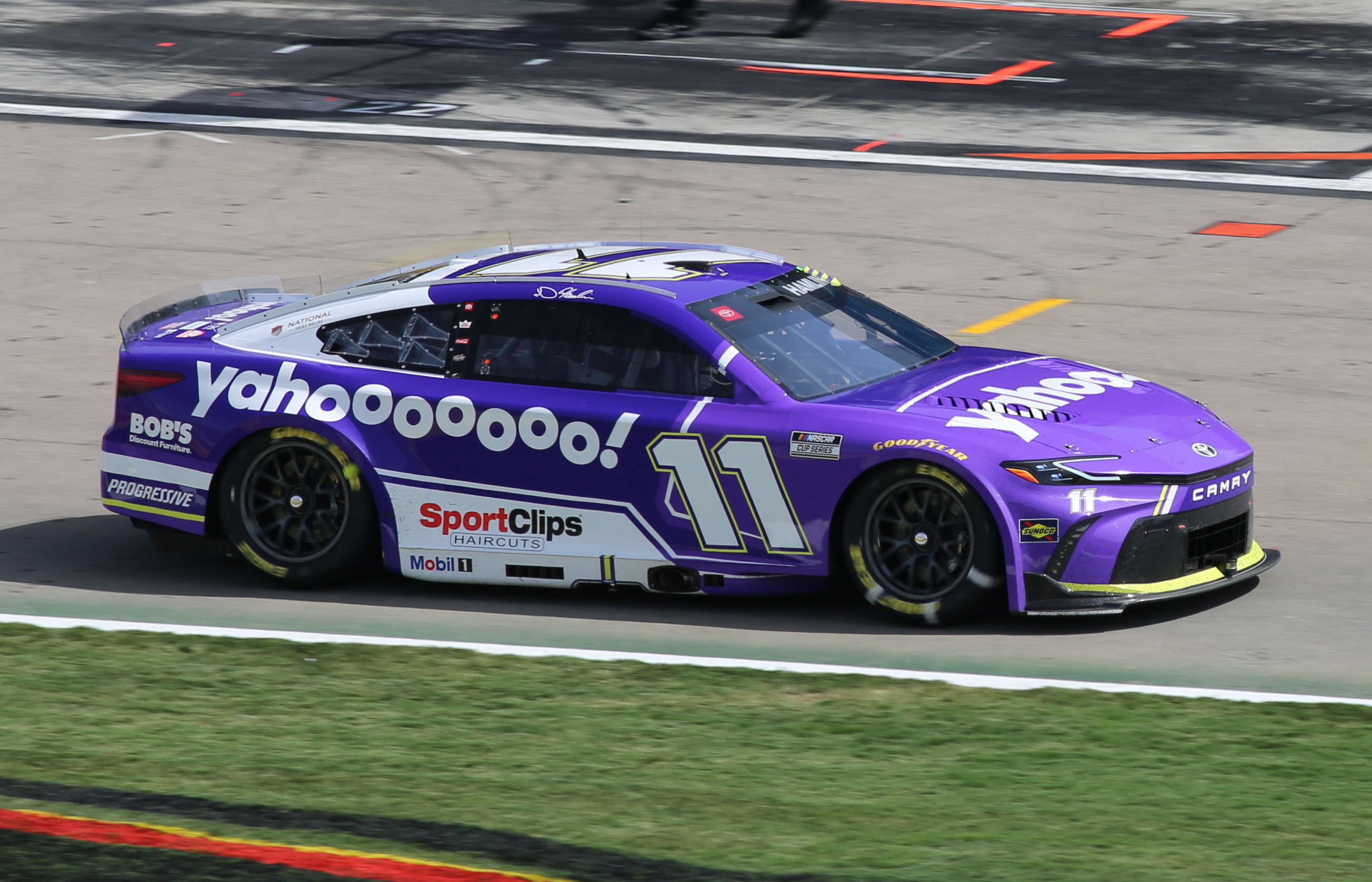
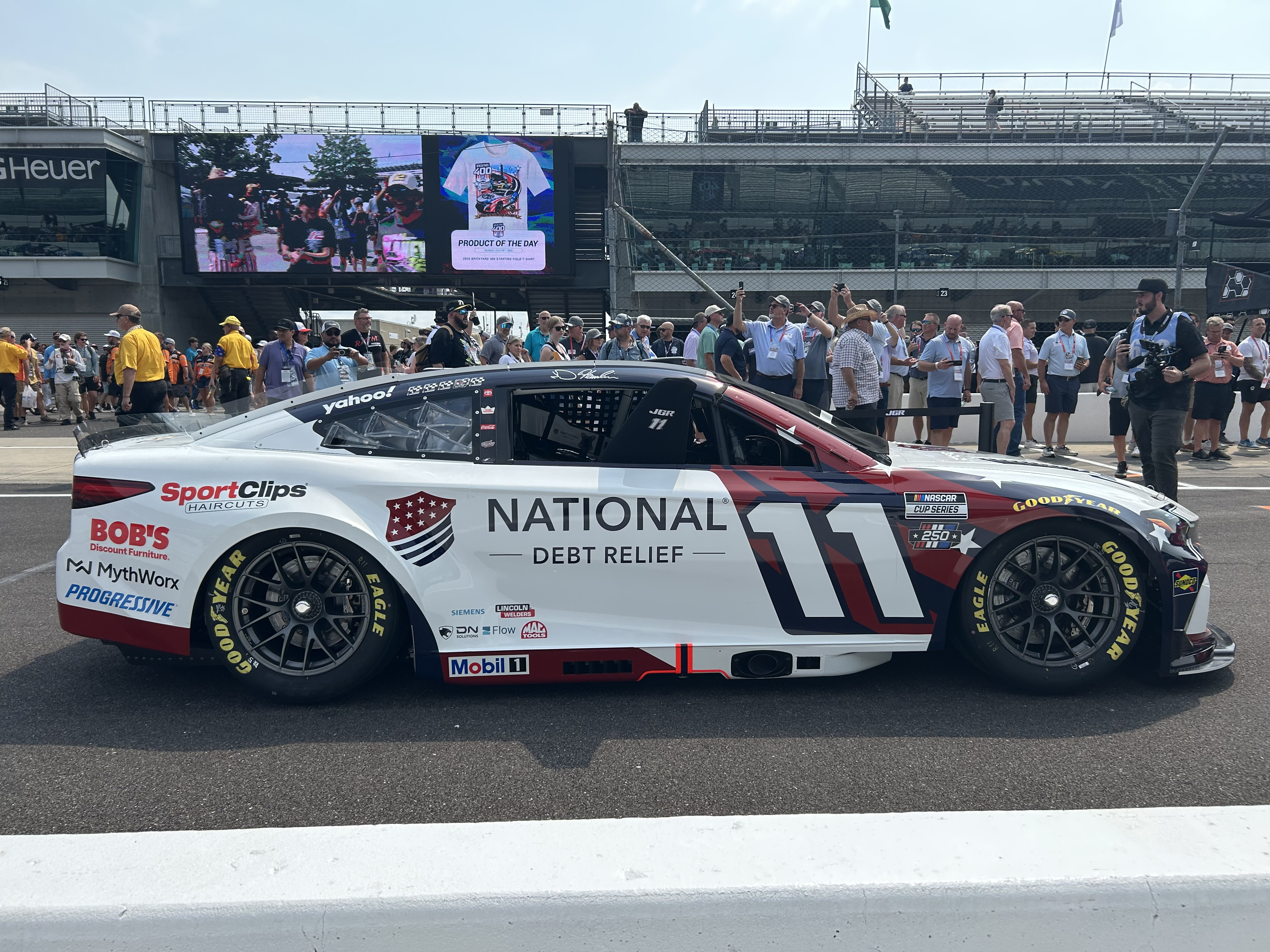
Hamlin's race-winning car at Las Vegas Motor Speedway (left) and his car at Indianapolis Motor Speedway (right)

Hamlin started the 2026 season with a 31st place finish in the Daytona 500, two laps down. A month later, he scored his 61st career Cup Series win at Las Vegas, placing him tenth on the list of all-time NASCAR Cup Series winners. Hamlin also won the All-Star Race for the first time since 2015. He backed this up a few weeks later, beating teammates Christopher Bell and Chase Briscoe in a 1-2-3 finish for JGR by winning at Nashville. The next two-weeks, he won at Michigan and Pocono, surpassing him with the late Kyle Busch for ninth on the list of all-time NASCAR Cup Series winners. In the process, Hamlin became the fourth driver in NASCAR history to both win the pole and the race for 3 consecutive races, the others being Richard Petty, Bobby Allison and Darrell Waltrip.

=== Superstar Racing Experience ===
On February 1, 2023, the Superstar Racing Experience (SRX) announced that Hamlin would compete in the 2023 SRX Series opener at Stafford Motor Speedway on July 13. He went on to win the event, which was shortened by lightning.

== Owner career ==
On September 21, 2020, Denny Hamlin and NBA Hall of Famer Michael Jordan, longtime friends, announced the formation of 23XI Racing, a single-car team for the 2021 NASCAR Cup Series season. Bubba Wallace would drive the No. 23 car. On October 4, 2021, Wallace secured his first career Cup Series victory at Talladega, making history as the first African-American driver to win a Cup race since Wendell Scott in 1963.

For the 2022 season, the team expanded to a two-car operation with the addition of the No. 45, driven by 2004 NASCAR Cup Series Champion Kurt Busch, who brought Monster Energy as a sponsor. On May 16, 2022, Kurt Busch delivered 23XI's second win at Kansas Speedway, leading 116 of 267 laps. Later that year, Wallace won the second Kansas race for the team that fall, driving the No. 45 in place of Busch, who was sidelined with concussion symptoms from a wreck at Pocono. In doing so, Wallace became the first African-American driver to win multiple Cup Series races.

On July 12, 2022, 23XI Racing and Toyota Racing Development (TRD) announced that Tyler Reddick would join the team full-time in 2024. However, following Busch's announcement on October 16 that he would step away from full-time racing in 2023, it was revealed that Reddick's contract with Richard Childress Racing would be bought out by 23XI, and he would replace Busch for the 2023 season.

Reddick won the 2024 NASCAR Cup Series regular season championship, the first for the team. 23XI Racing acquired a third charter from the defunct Stewart–Haas Racing, the No. 35 driven by Riley Herbst beginning in 2025. Wallace won the 2025 Brickyard 400 for the team. Jordan, Hamlin, and his team, along with Front Row Motorsports sued NASCAR in October 2024, over the new charter agreements; the case was later settled on December 11, 2025, after 8 days in court.

In 2026, Hamlin won his first Daytona 500 as an owner when Reddick won the race.

== In media ==
In 2016, Hamlin served as a guest analyst for Fox during the Xfinity Series race at Talladega. The following year, he returned to Fox for the Cup drivers-only broadcast of the Xfinity race at Pocono, where he worked from the Hollywood Hotel studio.

In 2021, Hamlin appeared in the music video for Post Malone's song "Motley Crew," alongside driver Bubba Wallace.

In 2023, Denny Hamlin launched a weekly podcast with Dirty Mo Media called Actions Detrimental, which airs every Monday morning. Hamlin hosts the show alongside his co-host, social media manager, and friend, Jared Allen. The podcast features content from the latest Cup Series race, fan questions in a segment called "Dear Denny," and additional race insights from Hamlin.

In 2025, Hamlin joined the NASCAR on The CW crew as a guest analyst at the Dover race. The following year, he joined the crew for Charlotte I and Atlanta II.

=== Video games ===
Hamlin, alongside his Toyota teammates, recorded video clips demonstrating how to drive a lap at each of the NASCAR tracks featured in the 2016 circuit for the video game NASCAR Heat Evolution. He was also one of eight playable drivers in the EA Sports NASCAR Racing arcade game, notably the only rookie featured. In 2022, Hamlin appeared on the front cover of NASCAR Rivals, alongside his car.

== Personal life ==
Hamlin is the youngest son of Dennis Hamlin and Mary Lou Clark. He was born in Tampa, Florida, at what is now St. Joseph's Women's Hospital, and moved to Virginia when he was two years old. Denny's father, who was in the late stages of COPD, died from injuries sustained in a house fire on December 28, 2025, at the age of 75.

Hamlin and Jordan Fish have two daughters and a son together. On January 1, 2024, Hamlin and Fish became engaged.

Hamlin is a basketball fan and has season tickets for the Charlotte Hornets of the National Basketball Association (NBA). Hamlin is also a recreational player and has torn the anterior cruciate ligament (ACL) in each of his knees once while playing, the left in 2010 and the right in 2015.

== Motorsports career results ==
=== Stock car career summary ===
Season	Series	Team	Races	Wins	Top 5	Top 10	Points	Position
2004	ARCA Re/Max Series	Fast Track Racing Enterprises	1	0	1	1	215	107th
2004	NASCAR Busch Series	Joe Gibbs Racing	1	0	0	1	142	103rd
2004	NASCAR Craftsman Truck Series	EJP Racing	5	0	0	1	582	37th
2005	ARCA Re/Max Series	Joe Gibbs Racing	1	0	0	0	50	169th
2005	NASCAR Busch Series	Joe Gibbs Racing	35	0	1	11	4143	5th
2005	NASCAR Nextel Cup Series	Joe Gibbs Racing	7	0	0	3	806	41st
2006	NASCAR Busch Series	Joe Gibbs Racing	35	2	12	23	4667	4th
2006	NASCAR Nextel Cup Series	Joe Gibbs Racing	36	2	8	20	6407	**3rd**
2006	NASCAR Craftsman Truck Series	Morgan-Dollar Motorsports	1	0	0	1	142	71st
2007	NASCAR Busch Series	Joe Gibbs Racing	22	3	11	16	3224	13th
2007	NASCAR Nextel Cup Series	Joe Gibbs Racing	36	1	12	18	6134	12th
2007	NASCAR Craftsman Truck Series	Billy Balew Motorsports	1	0	0	0	106	88th
2008	NASCAR Nationwide Series	Braun Racing	10	0	2	6	2758	19th
2008	NASCAR Nationwide Series	Joe Gibbs Racing	9	4	8	8	2758	19th
2008	NASCAR Sprint Cup Series	Joe Gibbs Racing	36	1	12	18	6214	8th
2008	NASCAR Craftsman Truck Series	Billy Balew Motorsports	2	0	1	1	270	54th
2009	NASCAR Nationwide Series	CJM Racing	3	0	1	1	729	60th
2009	NASCAR Nationwide Series	Joe Gibbs Racing	4	0	0	0	729	60th
2009	NASCAR Sprint Cup Series	Joe Gibbs Racing	36	4	15	20	6335	5th
2009	NASCAR Camping World Truck Series	Billy Balew Motorsports	1	0	0	1	155	74th
2010	NASCAR Nationwide Series	Joe Gibbs Racing	4	1	2	3	652	61st
2010	NASCAR Sprint Cup Series	Joe Gibbs Racing	36	8	14	18	6583	**2nd**
2010	NASCAR Camping World Truck Series	Billy Balew Motorsports	1	0	0	1	143	85th
2011	NASCAR Nationwide Series	Joe Gibbs Racing	5	1	4	5	0	NC†
2011	NASCAR Sprint Cup Series	Joe Gibbs Racing	36	1	5	14	2284	9th
2011	NASCAR Camping World Truck Series	Kyle Busch Motorsports	2	1	2	2	0	NC†
2012	NASCAR Nationwide Series	Joe Gibbs Racing	12	0	8	9	0	NC†
2012	NASCAR Sprint Cup Series	Joe Gibbs Racing	36	5	14	17	2329	6th
2012	NASCAR Camping World Truck Series	Kyle Busch Motorsports	2	1	2	2	0	NC†
2013	NASCAR Nationwide Series	Joe Gibbs Racing	1	0	1	1	0	NC†
2013	NASCAR Sprint Cup Series	Joe Gibbs Racing	32	1	4	8	753	23rd
2013	NASCAR Camping World Truck Series	Kyle Busch Motorsports	1	0	0	1	0	NC†
2014	NASCAR Nationwide Series	Joe Gibbs Racing	1	0	0	0	0	NC†
2014	NASCAR Sprint Cup Series	Joe Gibbs Racing	35	1	7	18	5037	**3rd**
2015	NASCAR Xfinity Series	Joe Gibbs Racing	11	3	7	9	0	NC†
2015	NASCAR Sprint Cup Series	Joe Gibbs Racing	36	2	14	20	2327	9th
2016	NASCAR Xfinity Series	Joe Gibbs Racing	2	1	2	2	0	NC†
2016	NASCAR Sprint Cup Series	Joe Gibbs Racing	36	3	12	22	2320	6th
2017	NASCAR Xfinity Series	Joe Gibbs Racing	4	2	3	3	0	NC†
2017	Monster Energy NASCAR Cup Series	Joe Gibbs Racing	36	2	15	22	2353	6th
2018	NASCAR Xfinity Series	Joe Gibbs Racing	1	0	1	1	0	NC†
2018	Monster Energy NASCAR Cup Series	Joe Gibbs Racing	36	0	10	17	2285	11th
2019	NASCAR Xfinity Series	Joe Gibbs Racing	1	0	0	0	0	NC†
2019	Monster Energy NASCAR Cup Series	Joe Gibbs Racing	36	6	19	24	5027	4th
2020	NASCAR Xfinity Series	Joe Gibbs Racing	1	0	1	1	0	NC†
2020	NASCAR Cup Series	Joe Gibbs Racing	36	7	18	21	5033	4th
2021	NASCAR Xfinity Series	Joe Gibbs Racing	1	0	0	0	0	NC†
2021	NASCAR Cup Series	Joe Gibbs Racing	36	2	19	25	5034	**3rd**
2022	NASCAR Cup Series	Joe Gibbs Racing	36	2	10	16	2379	5th
2023	NASCAR Xfinity Series	Joe Gibbs Racing	1	1	1	1	0	NC†
2023	NASCAR Cup Series	Joe Gibbs Racing	36	3	14	19	2383	5th
2023	Superstar Racing Experience	N/A	1	1	1	1	0	9th
2024	NASCAR Cup Series	Joe Gibbs Racing	36	3	12	18	2328	8th
2025	NASCAR Cup Series	Joe Gibbs Racing	35	6	14	18	5031	**2nd**
2026	NASCAR Cup Series	Joe Gibbs Racing	36	4	16	24	2445	**3rd**

^{†} As Hamlin was a guest driver, he was ineligible for championship points.

=== NASCAR ===
(key) (Bold – Pole position awarded by qualifying time. Italics – Pole position earned by points standings or practice time. * – Most laps led.)

==== Cup Series ====
NASCAR Cup Series results
Year	Team	No.	Make	1	2	3	4	5	6	7	8	9	10	11	12	13	14	15	16	17	18	19	20	21	22	23	24	25	26	27	28	29	30	31	32	33	34	35	36	NCSC	Pts	Ref
2005	Joe Gibbs Racing	11	Chevy	DAY	CAL	LVS	ATL	BRI	MAR	TEX	PHO	TAL	DAR	RCH	CLT	DOV	POC	MCH	SON	DAY	CHI	NHA	POC	IND	GLN	MCH	BRI	CAL	RCH	NHA	DOV	TAL	KAN; 32	CLT; 8	MAR; 8	ATL; 19	TEX; 7	**PHO**; 13	HOM; 33	41st	806	
2006	Joe Gibbs Racing	11	Chevy	DAY; 30	CAL; 12	LVS; 10	ATL; 31	BRI; 14	MAR; 37	TEX; 4	PHO; 34	TAL; 22	RCH; 2	DAR; 10	CLT; 9	DOV; 11	**POC**; 1*	MCH; 12	SON; 12	DAY; 17	CHI; 14	NHA; 6	**POC**; 1	IND; 10	GLN; 10	MCH; 9	BRI; 6	CAL; 6	**RCH**; 15	NHA; 4	DOV; 9	KAN; 18	TAL; 21	CLT; 28	MAR; 2	ATL; 8	TEX; 10	PHO; 3	HOM; 3	3rd	6407	
2007	Joe Gibbs Racing	11	Chevy	DAY; 28	CAL; 11	LVS; 3	ATL; 19	BRI; 14	**MAR**; 3	TEX; 9	PHO; 3	TAL; 21	RCH; 3	DAR; 2*	CLT; 9	DOV; 4	POC; 6*	MCH; 14	SON; 10	NHA; 1	DAY; 43	CHI; 17	IND; 22	POC; 3	GLN; 2	MCH; 5	BRI; 43	CAL; 19	RCH; 6	NHA; 15	DOV; 38	KAN; 29	TAL; 4*	CLT; 20	MAR; 6	ATL; 24	TEX; 29	PHO; 16	HOM; 3	12th	6143	
2008	Joe Gibbs Racing	11	Toyota	DAY; 17	CAL; 41	LVS; 9	ATL; 15	BRI; 6	MAR; 1	TEX; 5	PHO; 3	TAL; 3	**RCH**; 24*	DAR; 7	CLT; 24	DOV; 43	POC; 3	MCH; 14	SON; 27	NHA; 8	DAY; 26	CHI; 40	IND; 3	POC; 23	GLN; 8	MCH; 39	BRI; 3	CAL; 3	RCH; 3	NHA; 9	DOV; 38	KAN; 11	TAL; 39	CLT; 16	MAR; 5	ATL; 3	TEX; 17	PHO; 5	HOM; 13	8th	6214	
2009	Joe Gibbs Racing	11	Toyota	DAY; 26	CAL; 6	LVS; 22	ATL; 13	BRI; 2	MAR; 2	TEX; 12	PHO; 6	TAL; 22	RCH; 14	DAR; 13	CLT; 11	DOV; 36	POC; 38	MCH; 3	SON; 5	NHA; 15	DAY; 3	CHI; 5	IND; 34	POC; 1*	GLN; 10	MCH; 10	BRI; 5	ATL; 6	RCH; 1*	NHA; 2	DOV; 22	KAN; 5	**CAL**; 37	CLT; 42	MAR; 1*	TAL; 38	TEX; 2	PHO; 3	HOM; 1*	5th	6335	
2010	Joe Gibbs Racing	11	Toyota	DAY; 17	CAL; 29	LVS; 19	ATL; 21	BRI; 19	MAR; 1	PHO; 30	TEX; 1	TAL; 4	RCH; 11	DAR; 1	DOV; 4	CLT; 18	POC; 1*	MCH; 1*	SON; 34	NHA; 14	DAY; 24	CHI; 8	IND; 15	POC; 5	GLN; 37	MCH; 2	BRI; 34	**ATL**; 43	RCH; 1*	NHA; 2	DOV; 9	KAN; 12	CAL; 8	CLT; 4	**MAR**; 1	TAL; 9	TEX; 1	PHO; 12*	HOM; 14	2nd	6583	
2011	Joe Gibbs Racing	11	Toyota	DAY; 21	PHO; 11	LVS; 7	BRI; 33	CAL; 39	MAR; 12	TEX; 15	TAL; 23	RCH; 2	DAR; 6	DOV; 16	CLT; 10	KAN; 3	POC; 19*	MCH; 1	SON; 37	DAY; 13	KEN; 11	NHA; 3	IND; 27	POC; 15*	GLN; 36	MCH; 35	BRI; 7	ATL; 8	RCH; 9	CHI; 31	NHA; 29	DOV; 18	KAN; 16	CLT; 9	TAL; 8	MAR; 5	TEX; 20	PHO; 12	HOM; 9	9th	2284	
2012	Joe Gibbs Racing	11	Toyota	DAY; 4*	PHO; 1	LVS; 20	BRI; 20	**CAL**; 11	MAR; 6	TEX; 12	KAN; 1	RCH; 4	TAL; 23	DAR; 2	CLT; 2	DOV; 18	POC; 5	MCH; 34	SON; 35	KEN; 3	DAY; 25	NHA; 2*	**IND**; 6	POC; 29	GLN; 34	MCH; 11	BRI; 1	ATL; 1*	RCH; 18*	CHI; 16	NHA; 1*	**DOV**; 8	TAL; 14	CLT; 2	KAN; 13	MAR; 33	TEX; 20	PHO; 2	HOM; 24	6th	2329	
2013	Joe Gibbs Racing	11	Toyota	DAY; 14	PHO; 3	LVS; 15	BRI; 23*	**CAL**; 25	MAR	TEX	KAN	RCH	TAL; 34	DAR; 2	**CLT**; 4	**DOV**; 34	POC; 8	MCH; 30	SON; 23	KEN; 35	DAY; 36	NHA; 21	IND; 18	POC; 43	GLN; 19	MCH; 20	**BRI**; 28	ATL; 38	RCH; 21	CHI; 33	NHA; 12	DOV; 20	KAN; 23	CLT; 9	TAL; 38	**MAR**; 7	TEX; 7	PHO; 28	HOM; 1	23rd	753	
2014	Joe Gibbs Racing	11	Toyota	DAY; 2	PHO; 19	LVS; 12	**BRI**; 6	CAL; INQ^{†}	MAR; 19	TEX; 13	DAR; 19	RCH; 22	TAL; 1	KAN; 18	CLT; 22	DOV; 5	**POC**; 4	MCH; 29	SON; 26	KEN; 42	DAY; 6	NHA; 8	IND; 3	POC; 9	GLN; 24	MCH; 7	BRI; 40	ATL; 3	RCH; 21	CHI; 6	NHA; 37	DOV; 12	KAN; 7	CLT; 9	TAL; 18	MAR; 8	TEX; 10	**PHO**; 5	HOM; 7	3rd	5037	
2015	Joe Gibbs Racing	11	Toyota	DAY; 4	ATL; 38	LVS; 5	PHO; 23	CAL; 28	MAR; 1	TEX; 11	BRI; 26	RCH; 22	TAL; 9	KAN; 41	CLT; 8	**DOV**; 21	POC; 10	MCH; 11	SON; 18	DAY; 3	KEN; 3	NHA; 14	IND; 5	POC; 22	GLN; 27	MCH; 5	**BRI**; 3	DAR; 3	RCH; 6	CHI; 1	NHA; 2	DOV; 18	CLT; 4	KAN; 2	TAL; 37	MAR; 3	TEX; 38	PHO; 8	**HOM**; 10	9th	2327	
2016	Joe Gibbs Racing	11	Toyota	DAY; 1*	ATL; 16	LVS; 19	PHO; 3	CAL; 3	MAR; 39	TEX; 12	BRI; 20	RCH; 6	TAL; 31	KAN; 37	DOV; 7	CLT; 4	POC; 14	MCH; 33	SON; 2*	DAY; 17	KEN; 15	NHA; 9	IND; 4	POC; 7	GLN; 1	BRI; 3	MCH; 9	DAR; 4	**RCH**; 1	CHI; 6	NHA; 15	DOV; 9	CLT; 30	KAN; 15	TAL; 3	MAR; 3	TEX; 9	PHO; 7	HOM; 9	6th	2320	
2017	Joe Gibbs Racing	11	Toyota	DAY; 17	ATL; 38	LVS; 6	PHO; 10	CAL; 14	MAR; 30	TEX; 25	BRI; 10	RCH; 3	TAL; 11	KAN; 23	CLT; 5	DOV; 8	POC; 12	MCH; 4	SON; 4	DAY; 24	KEN; 4	NHA; 1	IND; 17	POC; 4	GLN; 4	MCH; 16	BRI; 3	DAR; 1*	RCH; 5	CHI; 4	NHA; 12	DOV; 35	**CLT**; 4	TAL; 6	KAN; 5	MAR; 7	TEX; 3	PHO; 35*	**HOM**; 9	6th	2353	
2018	Joe Gibbs Racing	11	Toyota	DAY; 3	ATL; 4	LVS; 17	PHO; 4	CAL; 6	MAR; 12	TEX; 34	BRI; 14	RCH; 3	TAL; 14	DOV; 7	KAN; 5	CLT; 3	POC; 35	MCH; 12	SON; 10	CHI; 7	DAY; 38	KEN; 16	NHA; 13	POC; 10	**GLN**; 13	**MCH**; 8	BRI; 14	**DAR**; 10	IND; 3*	LVS; 32	RCH; 16	ROV; 12	DOV; 2	TAL; 4	KAN; 14	MAR; 2	TEX; 30	PHO; 13	**HOM**; 12	11th	2285	
2019	Joe Gibbs Racing	11	Toyota	DAY; 1	ATL; 11	LVS; 10	PHO; 5	CAL; 7	MAR; 5	TEX; 1	BRI; 5	RCH; 5	TAL; 36	DOV; 21	KAN; 16	CLT; 17	POC; 6	MCH; 11	SON; 5	CHI; 15	DAY; 26	KEN; 5	NHA; 2	POC; 1	GLN; 3	MCH; 2	**BRI**; 1	DAR; 29	IND; 6	LVS; 15	RCH; 3	ROV; 19	**DOV**; 5*	TAL; 3	KAN; 1*	**MAR**; 4	TEX; 28	PHO; 1*	HOM; 10	4th	5027	
2020	Joe Gibbs Racing	11	Toyota	DAY; 1*	LVS; 17	CAL; 6	PHO; 20	DAR; 5	DAR; 1	CLT; 29	CLT; 2	BRI; 17*	ATL; 5	MAR; 24	HOM; 1*	TAL; 4	POC; 2	POC; 1*	IND; 28	KEN; 12	TEX; 20	KAN; 1*	NHA; 2	MCH; 6	MCH; 2	DRC; 2	DOV; 1*	DOV; 19	DAY; 3	DAR; 13	RCH; 12	BRI; 21	LVS; 3*	TAL; 1	ROV; 15	KAN; 15	TEX; 9	MAR; 11	PHO; 4	4th	5033	
2021	Joe Gibbs Racing	11	Toyota	DAY; 5*	DRC; 3	HOM; 11	LVS; 4	PHO; 3	ATL; 4	BRD; 3	MAR; 3*	RCH; 2*	TAL; 32*	KAN; 12	DAR; 5	DOV; 7	COA; 14	CLT; 7	SON; 8	NSH; 21	POC; 4	POC; 14	ROA; 5	ATL; 13	NHA; 10	GLN; 5	IRC; 23	MCH; 5	DAY; 13	DAR; 1	RCH; 2*	BRI; 9	LVS; 1*	TAL; 7	ROV; 5	TEX; 11	KAN; 5	MAR; 24	PHO; 3	3rd	5034	
2022	Joe Gibbs Racing	11	Toyota	DAY; 37	CAL; 15	LVS; 32	PHO; 13	ATL; 29	COA; 18	RCH; 1	MAR; 28	BRD; 35	TAL; 18	DOV; 21	DAR; 21	KAN; 4	**CLT**; 1	GTW; 34	SON; 31	**NSH**; 6*	ROA; 17	ATL; 25	NHA; 6	**POC**; 35	IRC; 14	MCH; 3*	RCH; 4	GLN; 20	DAY; 25	DAR; 2	KAN; 2	BRI; 9	TEX; 10	TAL; 5	ROV; 13	LVS; 5	HOM; 7	MAR; 5*	PHO; 8	5th	2379	
2023	Joe Gibbs Racing	11	Toyota	DAY; 17	CAL; 6	LVS; 11	PHO; 23	ATL; 6	COA; 16	RCH; 20	BRD; 22	MAR; 4	**TAL**; 17	DOV; 5	KAN; 1	DAR; 12	CLT; 35	GTW; 2	**SON**; 36	NSH; 3	**CSC**; 11	ATL; 14	NHA; 7	POC; 1	RCH; 2	MCH; 3	IRC; 19	**GLN**; 2	DAY; 26	DAR; 25*	KAN; 2	BRI; 1	TEX; 5	TAL; 3	ROV; 37	LVS; 10	HOM; 30	MAR; 3*	PHO; 8	5th	2383	
2024	Joe Gibbs Racing	11	Toyota	DAY; 19	ATL; 23	LVS; 8	**PHO**; 11*	BRI; 1*	COA; 14	RCH; 1	MAR; 11	TEX; 30	TAL; 37	DOV; 1*	KAN; 5*	DAR; 4	CLT; 5	GTW; 2	SON; 38	IOW; 24	NHA; 24	**NSH**; 12	CSC; 30	POC; 2	IND; 32	**RCH**; 2*	MCH; 9	DAY; 38	DAR; 7	ATL; 24	GLN; 23	BRI; 4	KAN; 8	TAL; 10	ROV; 14	LVS; 8	HOM; 3	MAR; 5	PHO; 11	8th	2328	
2025	Joe Gibbs Racing	11	Toyota	DAY; 24	ATL; 6	COA; 21	PHO; 2	LVS; 25	HOM; 5	MAR; 1*	DAR; 1	BRI; 2	TAL; 21	TEX; 38	KAN; 36	CLT; 16	NSH; 3	MCH; 1	MXC	**POC**; 2	ATL; 31	CSC; 4	SON; 20	DOV; 1	IND; 3	IOW; 24	GLN; 25	RCH; 10	DAY; 25	**DAR**; 7	**GTW**; 1*	BRI; 31	NHA; 12	KAN; 2*	ROV; 23	**LVS**; 1	TAL; 24	MAR; 35	**PHO**; 6*	2nd	5031	
2026	Joe Gibbs Racing	11	Toyota	DAY; 31	ATL; 13	COA; 10	PHO; 5	LVS; 1*	DAR; 11	**MAR**; 2*	BRI; 9	KAN; 4*	TAL; 15	TEX; 2	GLN; 16	CLT; 3	NSH; 1*	**MCH**; 1	**POC**; 1	COR; 14	SON; 26	**CHI**; 3	ATL; 12	NWS; 2	IND; 5	IOW; 5	RCH; 4	NHA; 7	DAY; 11	DAR; 18	GTW; 9	BRI; 8	KAN; 3	**LVS**; 16	CLT; 5	PHO; 28	TAL; 8	**MAR**; 6	HOM; 6*	3rd	2445	
^{†} – Qualified but replaced by Sam Hornish Jr.

===== Daytona 500 =====
Year	Team	Manufacturer	Start	Finish
2006	Joe Gibbs Racing	Chevrolet	17	30
2007	Joe Gibbs Racing	Chevrolet	9	28
2008	Joe Gibbs Racing	Toyota	4	17
2009	Joe Gibbs Racing	Toyota	10	26
2010	Joe Gibbs Racing	Toyota	25	17
2011	Joe Gibbs Racing	Toyota	18	21
2012	Joe Gibbs Racing	Toyota	31	4*
2013	Joe Gibbs Racing	Toyota	35	14
2014	Joe Gibbs Racing	Toyota	4	2
2015	Joe Gibbs Racing	Toyota	42	4
2016	Joe Gibbs Racing	Toyota	11	**1***
2017	Joe Gibbs Racing	Toyota	4	17
2018	Joe Gibbs Racing	Toyota	2	3
2019	Joe Gibbs Racing	Toyota	10	**1**
2020	Joe Gibbs Racing	Toyota	21	**1***
2021	Joe Gibbs Racing	Toyota	25	5*
2022	Joe Gibbs Racing	Toyota	30	37
2023	Joe Gibbs Racing	Toyota	18	17
2024	Joe Gibbs Racing	Toyota	8	19
2025	Joe Gibbs Racing	Toyota	8	24
2026	Joe Gibbs Racing	Toyota	22	31

==== Xfinity Series ====
NASCAR Xfinity Series results
Year	Team	No.	Make	1	2	3	4	5	6	7	8	9	10	11	12	13	14	15	16	17	18	19	20	21	22	23	24	25	26	27	28	29	30	31	32	33	34	35	NXSC	Pts	Ref
2004	Joe Gibbs Racing	18	Chevy	DAY	CAR	LVS	DAR	BRI	TEX	NSH	TAL	CAL	GTW	RCH	NZH	CLT	DOV	NSH	KEN	MLW	DAY	CHI	NHA	PPR	IRP	MCH	BRI	CAL	RCH	DOV	KAN	CLT	MEM	ATL	PHO	DAR; 8	HOM		103rd	142	
2005	Joe Gibbs Racing	20	Chevy	DAY; 33	CAL; 18	MXC; 15	LVS; 12	ATL; 16	NSH; 9	BRI; 9	TEX; 14	PHO; 11	TAL; 28	DAR; 7	RCH; 13	CLT; 20	DOV; 24	NSH; 7	KEN; 15	MLW; 6	DAY; 14	CHI; 15	NHA; 3	PPR; 14	GTW; 11	IRP; 6	GLN; 33	MCH; 8	BRI; 13	CAL; 20	RCH; 34	DOV; 6	KAN; 12	CLT; 30	MEM; 7	TEX; 19	PHO; 9	HOM; 37	5th	4143	
2006	Joe Gibbs Racing	20	Chevy	DAY; 14	CAL; 10	MXC; 1*	LVS; 6	ATL; 38	BRI; 4	**TEX**; 10	**NSH**; 3*	PHO; 39	TAL; 30	RCH; 10	**DAR**; 1	CLT; 29	DOV; 7	NSH; 4	**KEN**; 3	MLW; 2	DAY; 30	CHI; 14	NHA; 3	MAR; 3	**GTW**; 3*	**IRP**; 8	GLN; 12	MCH; 6	BRI; 22	CAL; 15	RCH; 6	DOV; 40	KAN; 33	CLT; 8	MEM; 6	TEX; 8	PHO; 3	HOM; 4	4th	4667	
2007	Joe Gibbs Racing	20	Chevy	DAY; 9	CAL; 8	MXC; 2	LVS; 12	ATL	BRI	NSH	TEX; 2	PHO; 4	TAL	**RCH**; 41	**DAR**; 1	CLT; 34	**DOV**; 2	NSH	KEN	MLW; RL^{†}	NHA; 5	DAY	**CHI**; 7	GTW	IRP	CGV	GLN; 14	MCH; 1	BRI	**CAL**; 3	RCH; 7	DOV; 1	KAN; 6	CLT; 5	MEM	TEX; 3	PHO; 28	HOM; 13	13th	3224	
2008	Braun Racing	32	Toyota	DAY; 8	CAL	LVS	ATL		NSH; 7	TEX			TAL; 37								NHA; 2		CHI; 2	GTW	IRP	CGV	GLN; 34	MCH	BRI; 36	CAL		DOV; 6				TEX; 14		HOM; 7	19th	2758	
2008	Joe Gibbs Racing	20	Toyota					BRI; 26			PHO; 3	MXC		RCH; 1		CLT; 2						DAY; 1																	19th	2758	
2008	Joe Gibbs Racing	18	Toyota												DAR; DNQ		DOV; 1*	NSH	KEN	MLW											RCH; 4		KAN; 1*	CLT	MEM		**PHO**; 2		19th	2758	
2009	Joe Gibbs Racing	20	Toyota	DAY	CAL	LVS; 21	BRI	TEX	NSH	PHO	TAL	RCH	DAR	CLT	DOV	NSH	KEN	MLW	NHA	DAY	CHI	GTW	IRP	IOW						**RCH**; 17	DOV; 27	KAN	CAL	CLT	MEM	TEX	**PHO**; 12		60th	729	
2009	CJM Racing	11	Toyota																						GLN; 34	MCH; 32	BRI	CGV	ATL									HOM; 5	60th	729	
2010	Joe Gibbs Racing	20	Toyota	DAY	CAL	LVS; 2	BRI	NSH	PHO	TEX	TAL	RCH	**DAR**; 1*	DOV; 12	CLT	NSH	KEN	ROA	NHA	DAY	CHI	GTW	IRP	IOW	GLN	MCH	BRI	CGV	ATL	RCH; 6	DOV	KAN	CAL	CLT	GTW	TEX	PHO	HOM	61st	652	
2011	Joe Gibbs Racing	20	Toyota	DAY	PHO	LVS; 7	BRI	CAL	TEX	TAL	NSH	RCH; 1*	DAR; 2	DOV	IOW	CLT	CHI	MCH	ROA	DAY	KEN	NHA	NSH	IRP	IOW	GLN	CGV	BRI	ATL	RCH	CHI	DOV	KAN	CLT					93rd	0^{1}	
2011	Joe Gibbs Racing	18	Toyota																																TEX; 2	PHO	HOM; 5		93rd	0^{1}	
2012	Joe Gibbs Racing	18	Toyota	DAY; 32	**PHO**; 9	LVS	BRI	CAL	TEX; 4	RCH; 2	TAL	DAR; 2	IOW	CLT; 2	DOV	MCH	ROA	KEN; 33	DAY	NHA	CHI	IND; 4	IOW	GLN	CGV	BRI	ATL; 12	RCH; 4	CHI	KEN	DOV	CLT; 5	KAN	TEX; 5	PHO	HOM			108th	0^{1}	
2013	Joe Gibbs Racing	20	Toyota	DAY	PHO	LVS	BRI	CAL	TEX	RCH	TAL	DAR	CLT	DOV	IOW	MCH	ROA	KEN	DAY	NHA	CHI	IND	IOW	GLN	MOH	BRI	ATL	RCH	CHI	KEN	DOV	KAN	CLT	TEX; 2	PHO	HOM			101st	0^{1}	
2014	Joe Gibbs Racing	20	Toyota	DAY	PHO	LVS	BRI	CAL	TEX	DAR	RCH	TAL	IOW	CLT	DOV	MCH	ROA	KEN	DAY	NHA	CHI	IND	IOW	GLN	MOH	BRI	ATL	RCH	CHI; 32	KEN	DOV	KAN	CLT	TEX	PHO	HOM			116th	0^{1}	
2015	Joe Gibbs Racing	54	Toyota	DAY	ATL	LVS; 4	PHO	CAL; 18	TEX; 7	BRI; 31				CLT; 2	DOV																								83rd	0^{1}	
2015	Joe Gibbs Racing	20	Toyota								**RCH**; 1*	TAL	IOW			MCH; 10	CHI	DAY	KEN	**NHA**; 1*	IND	IOW	GLN	MOH	**BRI**; 3*	ROA	**DAR**; 1*	RCH	CHI	KEN	DOV; 2	CLT	KAN	TEX	PHO	HOM			83rd	0^{1}	
2016	Joe Gibbs Racing	18	Toyota	DAY	ATL	LVS	PHO	CAL	TEX	BRI	RCH	TAL	DOV	CLT; 1*	POC	MCH	IOW	DAY	KEN	NHA	IND	IOW	GLN	MOH	BRI	ROA	DAR; 2	RCH	CHI	KEN	DOV	CLT	KAN	TEX	PHO	HOM			89th	0^{1}	
2017	Joe Gibbs Racing	20	Toyota	DAY	ATL; 20	LVS	PHO	CAL	TEX	BRI	RCH	TAL	CLT; 5	DOV	POC	MCH; 1	IOW	DAY	KEN	NHA	IND	IOW	GLN	MOH	BRI	ROA													100th	0^{1}	
2017	Joe Gibbs Racing	18	Toyota																								**DAR**; 1	RCH	CHI	KEN	DOV	CLT	KAN	TEX	PHO	HOM			100th	0^{1}	
2018	Joe Gibbs Racing	18	Toyota	DAY	ATL	LVS	PHO	CAL	TEX	BRI	RCH	TAL	DOV	CLT	POC	MCH	IOW	CHI	DAY	KEN	NHA	IOW	GLN	MOH	BRI	ROA	DAR; 4	IND	LVS	RCH	ROV	DOV	KAN	TEX	PHO	HOM			95th	0^{1}	
2019	Joe Gibbs Racing	18	Toyota	DAY	ATL	LVS	PHO	CAL	TEX	BRI	RCH	TAL	DOV	CLT	POC	MCH	IOW	CHI	DAY	KEN	NHA	IOW	GLN	MOH	BRI	ROA	DAR; 38	IND	LVS	RCH	ROV	DOV	KAN	TEX	PHO	HOM			107th	0^{1}	
2020	Joe Gibbs Racing	54	Toyota	DAY	LVS	CAL	PHO	DAR	CLT	BRI	ATL	HOM	HOM	TAL	POC	IRC	KEN	KEN	TEX	KAN	ROA	DRC	DOV	DOV	DAY	DAR; 5	RCH	RCH	BRI	LVS	TAL	ROV	KAN	TEX	MAR	PHO			79th	0^{1}	
2021	Joe Gibbs Racing	54	Toyota	DAY	DRC	HOM	LVS	PHO	ATL	MAR	TAL	DAR	DOV	COA	CLT	MOH	TEX	NSH	POC	ROA	ATL	NHA	GLN	IRC	MCH	DAY	DAR; 12*	RCH	BRI	LVS	TAL	ROV	TEX	KAN	MAR	PHO			89th	0^{1}	
2023	Joe Gibbs Racing	19	Toyota	DAY	CAL	LVS	PHO	ATL	COA	RCH	MAR	TAL	DOV	DAR	CLT	POR	SON	NSH	CSC	ATL	NHA	POC	ROA	MCH	IRC	GLN	DAY	DAR; 1	KAN	BRI	TEX	ROV	LVS	HOM	MAR	PHO			77th	0^{1}	
^{†} – Relieved Aric Almirola. Hamlin would go on to win the race, but it does not count towards his total, as Almirola started the race and therefore gets credited with the win.

==== Camping World Truck Series ====
NASCAR Camping World Truck Series results
Year	Team	No.	Make	1	2	3	4	5	6	7	8	9	10	11	12	13	14	15	16	17	18	19	20	21	22	23	24	25	NCWTC	Pts	Ref
2004	EJP Racing	03	Chevy	DAY	ATL	MAR	MFD	CLT	DOV	TEX	MEM	MLW	KAN	KEN	GTW	MCH	IRP; 10	NSH	BRI	RCH; 16	NHA; 11	LVS; 23	CAL	TEX; 18	MAR	PHO	DAR	HOM	37th	582	
2006	Morgan-Dollar Motorsports	46	Chevy	DAY	CAL	ATL	MAR	GTW	CLT	MFD	DOV	TEX	MCH	MLW	KAN	KEN	MEM	IRP	NSH	BRI	NHA	LVS	TAL	MAR; 8	ATL	TEX	PHO	HOM	71st	142	
2007	Billy Ballew Motorsports	15	Chevy	DAY	CAL	ATL	MAR	KAN	CLT	MFD	DOV	TEX	MCH	MLW	MEM	KEN	IRP	NSH	BRI	GTW	NHA	LVS	TAL	MAR; 19	ATL	TEX	PHO	HOM	88th	106	
2008	Billy Ballew Motorsports	15	Toyota	DAY	CAL	ATL	MAR; 21	KAN	CLT	MFD	DOV	TEX	MCH	MLW	MEM	KEN	IRP	NSH	BRI	GTW	NHA	LVS	TAL	MAR	ATL; 3	TEX	PHO	HOM	54th	270	
2009	Billy Ballew Motorsports	51	Toyota	DAY	CAL	ATL	MAR	KAN	CLT	DOV	TEX	MCH	MLW	MEM	KEN	IRP	NSH	BRI	CHI	IOW	GTW	NHA	LVS	MAR; 6	TAL	TEX	PHO	HOM	74th	155	
2010	Billy Ballew Motorsports	15	Toyota	DAY	ATL	MAR	NSH	KAN	DOV	CLT	TEX	MCH	IOW	GTW	IRP	POC; 9	NSH	DAR	BRI	CHI	KEN	NHA	LVS	MAR	TAL	TEX	PHO	HOM	85th	143	
2011	Kyle Busch Motorsports	18	Toyota	DAY	PHO	DAR	MAR	NSH	DOV	CLT	KAN	TEX	KEN	IOW	NSH	IRP	POC	MCH	BRI	ATL	CHI	NHA	KEN	LVS	TAL	MAR; 1*	TEX	HOM; 2	84th	0^{1}	
2012	Kyle Busch Motorsports	18	Toyota	DAY	MAR	CAR	KAN	CLT	DOV	TEX	KEN	IOW	CHI	POC; 5	MCH	BRI	ATL	IOW	KEN	LVS	TAL								79th	0^{1}	
2012	Kyle Busch Motorsports	51	Toyota																			MAR; 1	TEX	PHO	HOM				79th	0^{1}	
2013	Kyle Busch Motorsports	51	Toyota	DAY	MAR	CAR	KAN	CLT	DOV	TEX	KEN	IOW	ELD	POC	MCH	BRI	MSP	IOW	CHI	LVS	TAL	**MAR**; 6	TEX	PHO	HOM				93rd	0^{1}	

^{*} Season still in progress
^{1} Ineligible for series points

=== ARCA Re/Max Series ===
(key) (Bold – Pole position awarded by qualifying time. Italics – Pole position earned by points standings or practice time. * – Most laps led.)

ARCA Re/Max Series results
Year	Team	No.	Make	1	2	3	4	5	6	7	8	9	10	11	12	13	14	15	16	17	18	19	20	21	22	23	ARMC	Pts	Ref
2004	Fast Track Racing Enterprises	10	Pontiac	DAY	NSH	SLM	KEN	TOL	CLT	KAN	POC	MCH	SBO	BLN	KEN	GTW	POC	LER	NSH	ISF	TOL	DSF	CHI	SLM	TAL; 3		107th	215	
2005	Joe Gibbs Racing	2	Pontiac	DAY	NSH; 36	SLM	KEN	TOL	LAN	MIL	POC	MCH	KAN	KEN	BLN	POC	GTW	LER	NSH	MCH	ISF	TOL	DSF	CHI	SLM	TAL	169th	50	

=== Superstar Racing Experience ===
(key) * – Most laps led. ^{1} – Heat 1 winner. ^{2} – Heat 2 winner.

Superstar Racing Experience results
Year	No.	1	2	3	4	5	6	SRXC	Pts
2023	11	STA I 1^{1}	STA II	MMS	BER	ELD	LOS	9th	0^{1}

Achievements
Preceded by Joey Logano; Austin Dillon	Daytona 500 Winner; 2016; 2019; 2020	Succeeded by Kurt Busch; Michael McDowell
Preceded by Kyle Larson	Coca-Cola 600 Winner; 2022	Succeeded by Ryan Blaney
Preceded by Mark Martin; Martin Truex Jr. Kevin Harvick	Cook Out Southern 500 winner 2010; 2017; 2021	Succeeded by Regan Smith; Brad Keselowski; Erik Jones
Preceded by Jimmie Johnson; Kevin Harvick; Matt Kenseth	Busch Clash winner 2006; 2014; 2016; 2024	Succeeded by Tony Stewart; Matt Kenseth; Joey Logano; Chase Elliott
Preceded by Jamie McMurray	NASCAR All-Star Race winner 2015; 2026	Succeeded by Joey Logano; Incumbent
Awards
Preceded by Kyle Busch	NASCAR Nextel Cup Series Rookie of the Year; 2006	Succeeded by Juan Pablo Montoya
