= NASCAR on Fox =

US television program

- Logo used since February 19, 2017
- Also known as: Fox NASCAR
- Genre: Auto racing telecasts
- Directed by: TBA
- Presented by: See "current commentators" section
- Theme music composer: Scott Schreer
- Opening theme: "NASCAR on Fox theme" (2001–2008, 2016–present); "NASCAR Love" (2008); "Everything I Ask For" (2009–2010); "Sideways" (2011–2012); "NFL on Fox theme" (2011–2015)
- Ending theme: Same as opening theme
- Composer: Scott Schreer
- Country of origin: United States
- Original language: English

Production
- Producer: Michael Hughes
- Production locations: Various NASCAR venues (race telecasts); Fox Network Center, Charlotte, North Carolina (studio segments, pre-race and post-race shows)
- Editors: Matt Tan (39 episodes, 2013–2015); Jason Myers (unknown episodes); Darol Michael Carr (unknown episodes); David Millar (segment editor) (unknown episodes)
- Camera setup: Multi-camera
- Running time: Varies, but typically 4.5 hours (ranges from 4 to 5 hours) or until race ends
- Production companies: Fox Sports; NASCAR Productions (any series besides Cup, since 2025)

Original release
- Network: Fox (2001–present); FS1 (2013–present); FS2 (2013–present); Fox Sports Net (2001–2002); FX (2001–2006); SPEED Channel (2002–2013); Fox News Channel (2015; only prerace coverage for Kansas Cup race); Fox Business Network (2016–present); Fox Deportes (2013–present)
- Release: February 11, 2001 – present

Related
- NASCAR Race Hub (2009–2024); NASCAR RaceDay; NASCAR Victory Lane (2001–2017); NASCAR Live!; Totally NASCAR

NASCAR on Fox, also known as Fox NASCAR, is the branding used for broadcasts of NASCAR races produced by Fox Sports and have aired on the Fox television network in the United States since 2001. Speed, a motorsports-focused cable channel owned by Fox, began broadcasting NASCAR-related events in February 2002, with its successor Fox Sports 1 taking over Fox Sports' cable event coverage rights when that network replaced Speed in August 2013. Throughout its run, Fox's coverage of NASCAR has won thirteen Emmy Awards.

== History ==
=== 2001–2006 contract ===
On November 11, 1999, after announcing that NASCAR television contracts would be centralized ending an era where race tracks struck individual agreements with networks to broadcast races, NASCAR signed a contract that awarded the American television rights to its races to four networks (two that would hold the broadcast television rights and two that would hold the cable television rights), split between Fox and sister cable channel FX, and NBC and TBS (whose rights were later assumed by TNT) starting with the 2001 season. Fox and FX would alternate coverage of all races held during the first half of the season, while NBC and TNT would air all races held during the second half.

Beginning in 2001, Fox alternated coverage of the first and most preeminent race of the season, the Daytona 500, with Fox televising the race in odd-numbered years and NBC airing it in even-numbered years through 2006. For balance, the network that did not air the 500 in a given year during the contract would air Daytona's summer night race, the Pepsi 400. Valued at $2.4 billion, Fox/FX held the rights to this particular contract for eight years (through 2008) and NBC/TNT having the rights for six years (through 2006). Fox Sports Net covered the 2001 Gatorade Twin 125's at Daytona International Speedway, the only time it ever covered a race. Further on the cable side, in October 2002, Speed Channel – which was owned by the Fox broadcast network's parent subsidiary Fox Entertainment Group – obtained the rights to televise all of the races in the Craftsman Truck Series, a contract it bought out from ESPN.

During the first half of the season, FX served as the primary broadcaster of the Busch Series, airing all but the most prestigious races, which were instead shown on Fox. FX was also home to most of the NASCAR Cup Series night races, The Winston/All-Star Race, and the June race at Dover International Speedway.

In those years, if a Fox-scheduled race was rained out on the scheduled race day and rescheduled to resume the following Monday (or Sunday in the case of a Saturday night race), FX would air the race and selected Fox stations would pick it up if syndicators permitted it. (Rained out races now air in their entirety on the network it originally was scheduled for (example: a race scheduled for Fox on Sunday would remain on Fox on the rescheduled day), unlike NBC, which moves its rained out races to other NBCUniversal properties such as CNBC (if on a weekend) or USA Network.)

=== 2007–2014 contract ===
On December 7, 2005, NASCAR signed a new eight-year broadcast deal effective with the 2007 season, and valued at $4.48 billion, with Fox and Speed Channel, which would also share event rights with Disney-owned ABC, ESPN and ESPN2, as well as TNT. The rights would be divided as follows:

- Fox became the exclusive broadcaster of the Daytona 500 and also hold the rights to the first thirteen points paying races. In addition, the network carried the Sprint Unlimited and two Truck Series races (the network aired the Kroger 250 from Martinsville Speedway, and the Ohio 250 at Mansfield Motorsports Park in 2007, and the Kroger 250 from Martinsville, as well as the San Bernardino County 200 at Auto Club Speedway, in both 2008 and 2009). Fox did not air any races of what is now the Craftsman Truck Series from 2010 to 2013, with all 25 races instead airing on Speed and later Fox Sports 1. Fox's 2011 coverage ended with the STP 400 at Kansas Speedway.
- TNT carried six NASCAR Cup Series races during the month of June and the first half of July, including the Coke Zero 400 at Daytona. In 2013, in particular, the network aired Pocono Raceway, Michigan International Speedway, Sonoma Raceway, Kentucky Speedway, the Coke Zero 400, and New Hampshire Motor Speedway.
- ESPN and ABC (through the ESPN on ABC arrangement) carried the final seventeen NASCAR Cup Series races from the Brickyard 400 through the end of the season, with the Cup Series Chase for the Championship races airing on ABC (until 2010, when ESPN took over most of the coverage, leaving ABC with the last 3 Saturday night races in their broadcasting period). The entire Nationwide season was aired primarily on ESPN2 and ESPN, with selected races on ABC, NASCAR returned to ESPN airing the first six races including Daytona, Atlanta, Las Vegas, and ESPN2 carrying Phoenix to Michigan.
- Speed/Fox Sports 1 carried the Budweiser Duel races and the Sprint All-Star Race, as well as the entire Camping World Truck Series season, except for the 2 races carried each year by Fox from 2007 to 2009. After the 2009 season, all the Truck races aired on Speed/FS1 – with the exception of the 2014 Talladega race, which aired on Fox.

=== 2015–2024 contract ===
In October 2012, NASCAR extended its contract with Fox Sports through 2022, which allowed Fox the online streaming rights for its event telecasts; the Fox Sports contract also retains coverage of the first 13 races of the NASCAR Cup Series and exclusive coverage of the Daytona 500. On August 1, 2013, Fox Sports extended its contract by two additional years through 2024, due to NASCAR's contract with NBC Sports running through that same time, and acquired the rights to the first 16 races of the NASCAR Cup Series season, as well as the first 14 Xfinity (formerly Nationwide) Series events. As a result, Fox will broadcast the races it already covers, as well as all of the events held in June, which include the events at Pocono and Michigan with coverage ending with the Toyota/Save Mart 350 at Sonoma. Fox had previously held rights to these three races under its initial 2001–06 contract.

Under the deal:

- Fox broadcasts the first nine points races and two other races, the Coca-Cola 600 (totaling 11 races over the air), including the Daytona 500 and Busch Clash, Fox Sports 1 carries several other events, including the Bluegreen Vacations Duel, the All-Star Race and all other points races in the first half of the season that do not air on Fox (six races, four straight races after Fox's first nine races, then a break for the Coca-Cola 600, then two more race after that), plus the first half of the Xfinity Series season, with the exception of the more prestigious races, which aired on Fox from 2015 to 2018 and will be shown there in 2020–2024. They were aired on FS1 exclusively in 2012–2014 and 2019.
- The Craftsman Truck Series remains exclusively on FS1, with 1-3 races airing on Fox.
- Starting in 2013, Spanish-language network Fox Deportes airs select NASCAR Cup races either live or delayed.

=== 2025–2031 contract ===
In November 2023, Fox extended its contract through 2031. Fox will significantly decrease the amount of races aired compared to the previous contract.

Under the deal:

- Fox Sports will air the first 14 races of the NASCAR Cup Series season. Fox Sports will only air practice and qualifying for the Daytona 500, Cook Out Clash at Bowman Gray Stadium, and NASCAR All-Star Race.
- Fox Sports will air every race, along with practice and qualifying, from the Truck Series, with most races on FS1 (select races will air on Fox).

== Commentators ==
=== Pre-Race ===
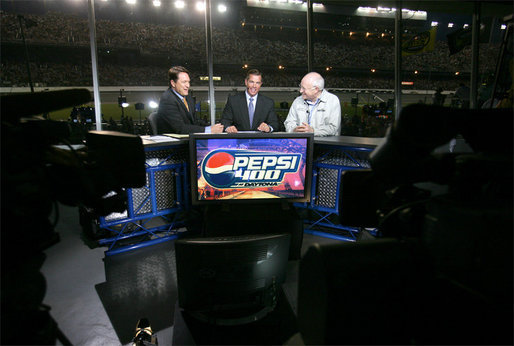
Chris Myers (left) and Jeff Hammond (center) appear on the studio set alongside Vice President of the United States Dick Cheney (right) during the 2006 Pepsi 400.

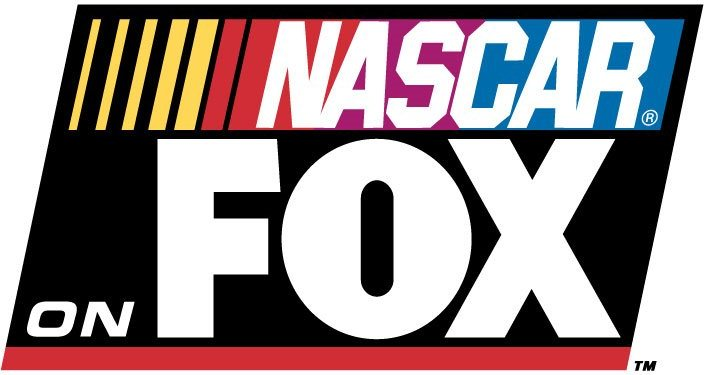
NASCAR on Fox original logo (2001–2012)

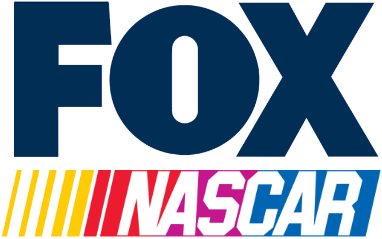
NASCAR on Fox vertical logo (2015–2016)

From 2001 to 2018, Fox used a portable studio called the Hollywood Hotel for pre-race coverage. For the 2001 to 2007 races held at Daytona International Speedway, the building next to Gatorade Victory Lane was used instead.

If the race was delayed to a Monday, the Hollywood Hotel studio would usually not be used, with the exception of the 2012 Daytona 500, which was delayed by one day. This was because Myers also hosted a talk-show for Fox Sports Radio, resulting in him having to return to Los Angeles to begin the following week's shows. John Roberts filled in for Myers for this particular race, and had also filled in for Myers the previous week for the Budweiser Shootout, as Myers was on bereavement leave.

However, if a Saturday night race was rained out to Sunday, then the studio would be in use for the delayed coverage. Prior to 2015, if the hotel was no longer available, Jeff Hammond could be shifted to substitute for a pit reporter or analyst if necessary. For instance, Hammond did this in 2002 for the Dodge/Save Mart 350 at Sonoma Raceway to replace Steve Byrnes, as Byrnes was unable to make it due to the birth of his son Bryson. During the 2004 Dodge/Save Mart 350, the studio was not used and Myers and Hammond were located on the hillside on outdoor chairs; no explanation was given for this.

In 2011, Pizza Hut became the presenting sponsor of the pre-race show. In addition, the first segment of the telecast was moved from the hotel to a tented facility either trackside or in the infield, depending on the venue. The idea was to build a crowd around the production of the segment; this had similarities to Fox's own NFL pregame show in 2006, as well as the College GameDay football and basketball shows on ESPN.

In 2012, John Roberts filled in for Chris Myers as host for the Budweiser Shootout and the Daytona 500, as Myers was on bereavement leave following his son's death in a motorcycle accident. For the 2014 Sprint Unlimited, Michael Waltrip filled in for Darrell, who was undergoing gallbladder surgery; for Daytona 500 Practice and Pole Qualifying, the position was filled by Phil Parsons. Darrell Waltrip returned for the Budweiser Duels. In 2016, Jeff Gordon replaced McReynolds in the booth while McReynolds was reassigned as the rules and technical analyst, replacing Andy Petree.

In 2017, Dale Earnhardt Jr. joined the Fox booth as a guest color commentator for the Clash after deciding not to compete in the race as a driver. He would become a permanent color commentator for NBC in 2018 after he retired from driving full-time. With NBC's permission, Jr. returned to Fox as a guest color commentator for the GEICO 500 at Talladega in April 2022.

On June 10, 2017, the Xfinity Series race at Pocono Raceway was presented by current drivers in the Cup Series, the first time that a national sporting event was covered by currently active athletes. The presenters provided coverage from all three perspectives during the race (Hollywood Hotel studio, lap-by-lap commentary and pit road coverage). The driver commentators were Kevin Harvick (lap-by-lap), Joey Logano, Clint Bowyer (color analysts), Erik Jones, Ryan Blaney, Ricky Stenhouse Jr. (pit road), Danica Patrick and Denny Hamlin (Hollywood Hotel).

On April 28, 2018, the Sparks Energy 300, the Xfinity race at Talladega Superspeedway, was an all-drivers broadcast, the second time that a national sporting event was covered entirely by active athletes, the first being the aforementioned Pocono race. The presenters provided coverage from all three perspectives during the race (Hollywood Hotel studio, lap-by-lap commentary and pit road coverage). The booth team of Harvick, Logano and Bowyer was retained, while Ricky Stenhouse Jr. was moved to the Hollywood Hotel alongside Brad Keselowski, with Bubba Wallace replacing Stenhouse as a pit road reporter.

The studio was retired following the 2018 season due to the Charlotte studios getting redone in order to host more shows. In 2019, Fox often cut to the Charlotte studio during the race and talked to Jamie McMurray, who was new to the NASCAR on Fox team; also in 2019, Shannon Spake replaced Chris Myers as host due to Myers being moved to Fox's Premier Boxing Champions coverage, although Myers appeared on site for the Daytona 500, while Adam Alexander served as on site host for the rest of the season.

On May 25, 2019, the Alsco 300, the Xfinity race at Charlotte Motor Speedway, was an all-drivers broadcast, the third time that a national sporting event was covered entirely by active athletes, the first being the aforementioned Pocono race. The presenters provided coverage from all three perspectives during the race (Hollywood Hotel studio, lap-by-lap commentary and pit road coverage). The booth team of Harvick, Logano and Bowyer was retained, Erik Jones, Ryan Blaney, Bubba Wallace (pit road) was also retained. Brad Keselowski, Ricky Stenhouse Jr., and Chad Knaus hosted from the Charlotte studios.

In 2020, due to the COVID-19 pandemic, Fox started using their Charlotte Studio to the maximum extent possible to avoid travel, ensure social distancing, and limit the number of staff onsite at races. The only on-air talent onsite was at most two pit reporters per race; all other talent was stationed at the Fox Studios in Charlotte.

In 2021, Myers returned to hosting the at-track portions of pre-race alongside Jeff Gordon and Clint Bowyer. Spake, McReynolds, and McMurray would host pre-race coverage from the Charlotte studios.

After the 2021 season, Gordon left Fox to work for Hendrick Motorsports full-time as the team's Vice Chairman. (He had previously worked with the team during the second half of the Cup Series season when NBC was broadcasting the races, after spending his entire full-time career with them). Fox did not replace him with one permanent color commentator and instead filled his spot with rotating guest commentators as they do in the Xfinity, Truck and ARCA Series. Retired Cup Series driver Tony Stewart was the first guest color commentator and was in the booth for the Clash, the Daytona 500 and the race at COTA.

=== Current commentators ===
==== Cup Series ====
Source: Booth announcers

- Mike Joy (play-by-play)
- Clint Bowyer (color commentator)
- Kevin Harvick (color commentator)

Race Strategy, Technical and Rules analyst

- Larry McReynolds

Pre-race show (at track)

- Chris Myers (host)
- Jamie McMurray (analyst)
- Michael Waltrip (gridwalk)
- Tom Rinaldi (features)

==== Craftsman Truck Series ====
- Eric Brennan – rotating play-by-play announcer
- Brent Stover – rotating play–by–play announcer
- Kevin Harvick – color commentator / play–by–play announcer
- Michael Waltrip – color commentator
- Townsend Bell – color commentator
- Phil Parsons – color commentator
- Regan Smith – color commentator
- Todd Bodine – color commentator
- Rotation of cup series drivers and crew chiefs (color commentator for select races, see full list below)
  - TBA

==== ARCA Menards Series ====
- Eric Brennan – rotating play-by-play announcer
- Brent Stover – rotating play–by–play announcer
- Phil Parsons – color commentator
- Trevor Bayne – color commentator
- Rotation of cup series drivers and crew chiefs (color commentator for select races, see full list below)
  - Austin Cindric – color commentator (Daytona, Kansas, Talladega, Watkins Glen, Dover)
  - Brenden Queen – color commentator (Talladega)

=== Pit reporters ===
- Jamie Little (all Cup races)
- Regan Smith (all Cup and select Truck races)
- Josh Sims (select Cup, Truck and ARCA races)
- Amanda Busick (select Truck and ARCA races)
- Kaitlyn Vincie (select ARCA, Truck, and Cup races)
- Todd Bodine (select Truck races)
- Alex Weaver (select ARCA races)
- Georgia Henneberry (select Truck races)
- Hermie Sadler (select Truck races)

=== Pre and post-race show ===
- Chris Myers – on-site host (Cup Series)
- Michael Waltrip – on-site analyst (Cup Series)
- Larry McReynolds – studio analyst (all Cup races and select Truck Series races)
- Jamie McMurray – on-site analyst (Cup Series)
- Bobby Labonte – studio analyst (Cup Series)
- Trevor Bayne – studio analyst (Cup and Trucks)
- Todd Bodine – studio analyst (Truck Series races)

=== Former commentators ===
See List of NASCAR on Fox broadcasters

== NASCAR on Speed ==
NASCAR on Speed was the brand name of Speed's coverage of NASCAR Sprint Cup Series, NASCAR O'Reilly Auto Parts Series practice sessions, qualifying sessions and a limited number of races (2007–2013 for Cup, 2002–2013 for O'Reilly practice & qualifying when not covered by ESPN 2007–2013, 2010 & 2011 for O'Reilly races, 2003–2013 for trucks), as well as Camping World Truck Series races that began in 2003. It was produced by Fox Sports. Pre-race coverage was usually by NASCAR RaceDay while post-race coverage was on NASCAR Victory Lane. Other programs, such as Speed Center and Wind Tunnel with Dave Despain also provided limited coverage of NASCAR related events. Starting in August 2013, Speed's coverage of NASCAR including RaceDay, Victory Lane and NASCAR Live! moved to Fox Sports 1.

The channel's original iteration, Speedvision, previously carried several NASCAR Winston West Series races on tape delay basis.

== Theme music ==
The original theme music for NASCAR on Fox broadcasts was in the same style as other Fox Sports properties (such as for NFL and Major League Baseball coverage) and was originally used from 2001 to 2008. In 2008, Fox introduced a new theme for its NASCAR telecasts titled NASCAR Love, performed by folk rock singer-songwriter Toby Lightman (an instrumental version was used for the opening segment). However in 2009, Lightman stopped singing the song and was replaced by The Maine and NASCAR Love was phased out and replaced by a reworked version of their hit song, "Everything I Ask For" with newly-written lyrics referencing NASCAR – which was played during the introduction of the pre-race show. From the 2011 Budweiser Shootout to 2015, Fox used the NFL on FOX theme song in NASCAR telecasts. In addition, country superstar Dierks Bentley unveiled a reworked version of his hit song "Sideways,” also with newly-written lyrics referencing NASCAR – which was played during the introduction of the pre-race show. "Sideways" was phased out entirely with the 2013 Sprint Unlimited telecast, with the Fox NFL theme music being used full-time. In addition, a new CGI introduction sequence, produced by Blur Studio, made its debut.

In 2015, the introduction sequence was eliminated in favor of intros unique to each track.

In 2016, Fox and FS1 (Cup Series only) reintroduced the original theme used between 2001 and 2008. FS1 continues to use their old theme for Xfinity Series and Truck Series.

== On-screen graphics ==
Fox is known for being the first network to show a scoring banner across the top of the screen with scrolling text during NASCAR telecasts. In previous years when ESPN, CBS, and others owned the broadcasting rights, scoring had been displayed in a box on the top left corner. Fox was also the first network to use the unique font/styling for each car number (such as Dale Earnhardt's number 3, Jeff Gordon's 24, the Petty 43) for their on-screen graphics, as opposed to a generic font (however the banner continued to use just text). Other networks would adopt this innovation and is now commonplace for most American motorsport broadcasts.

From its debut until 2013, Fox initially used a scrolling ticker to display the current running order of drivers and other information (such as intervals and other statistics, shown on an occasionally displayed secondary line), instead of the boxes that were used by previous NASCAR broadcasters. Fox would eventually deploy the banner design across all of its sports properties, while its conventions would be adopted by fellow NASCAR broadcasters, including NBC, TNT, and later ESPN.

For the 2014 season, alongside a new corporate style, Fox replaced the scrolling ticker with a leaderboard-style sidebar occupying the right-side portion of the screen, with one section displaying the top three drivers, and a scrolling section displaying the remainder of the field of drivers. While Fox Sports president Eric Shanks justified the changes, noting that it would allow more of the field to be displayed at once and more frequently than the relatively longer ticker, the leaderboard was criticized by viewers during events leading up to the Daytona 500 (such as the Sprint Unlimited, Daytona 500 qualifying, and the ARCA series Lucas Oil 200) for obstructing too much of the screen.

In response to the criticism, Shanks stated that the layout of the leaderboard would be revised in time for the Daytona 500. The vertical leaderboard was reconfigured into a horizontal version with three columns of 3 drivers each, which could be resized into 2 longer columns of three drivers each to display intervals or other statistics (a version that was later used as the main graphic).

In the 2018 NASCAR season, NASCAR coverage adopted a new flat graphics package previously introduced during the previous NFL season. This package reintroduced a vertical leaderboard, although this time it initially occupied an opaque sidebar spanning the entire left side of the screen. The design was once-again criticized by viewers during events leading up to the Daytona 500, as the opaque sidebar reduced the amount of screen space devoted to race footage to a roughly 4:3 window, the ticker fell within overscan on some televisions, while some camera shots were not correctly framed to suit the new layout. By the Daytona 500, the graphic had been revised to remove the opaque sidebar, and make the leaderboard slightly translucent.

In 2019, during Daytona 500 qualifying, Fox introduced a new augmented reality "GhostCar," allowing for a live visualization of a previous driver's qualifying lap (such as the leader or driver on the bubble) to be overlaid into live footage of another driver's qualifying attempt. NBC had introduced the system in 2018, but only during replays. The GhostCar feature was re-introduced later in the season, when NASCAR ended its multi-car qualifying format in favor of the previous single-car format.

In 2022, Fox introduced a revamp of its on-air presentation for NASCAR (as part of a move towards dedicated graphics packages for each of Fox Sports' major properties, rather than a standard look shared by all telecasts), the package was built upon visual elements from the then-current NFL on Fox branding, including cel-shaded imagery, and the use of stylized "comic book" illustrations of drivers. Fox introduced a revamped presentation for the 2026 season, which dropped the comic book-inspired appearance in favor of a metallic design inspired by speed, as well as cleaner, typography-oriented graphics with increased data integration.

== Awards ==
NASCAR on Fox has won 13 Emmy Awards for its coverage, including three for Outstanding Sports Series (2001, 2005, 2007), six for Outstanding Live Event Audio Sound (2002, 2005, 2006, 2011, 2012, 2013), one for Outstanding Graphic Design (2001), five for Outstanding Technical Team Remote (2001, 2003, 2004, 2005, 2007) and one for Promotional Announcement Episodic (2008).

== Criticisms ==
=== Turn cam and "Digger" ===
After limited usage in 2007, the network introduced the "Gopher Cam" full-time in 2008, a camera angle from the bottom banking of a track's turn. Fox implied that it invented the technology. However, it was quickly brought to light that Terry Lingner of ESPN, along with engineer James Fishman, had developed the technology 15 years earlier under the name "Tread Cam.” However, it should be known that the devices are completely different.

"Digger," a CGI-animated gopher character that was voiced by Eric Bauza, began as a symbol of the corner camera and was later adopted as an unofficial mascot for Fox's NASCAR coverage. Beginning with the 2009 Daytona 500, Digger was extended into a series of short cartoons that aired during the pre-race show, country music superstar Keith Urban recorded the theme song for these shorts. Storylines revolved around Digger and his life beneath the infield of a fictional racetrack. Other characters include his girlfriend Annie and the track's security chief, Lumpy Wheels (respectively named after the daughter of Fox Sports president David Hill, and former track promoter Humpy Wheeler). Digger's souvenir trailer at the tracks attracted sizeable crowds of families with young children. However, the cartoon segment drew wide opposition from regular viewers of the broadcasts.

After a NASCAR town hall-style meeting at the end of May 2009, Fox Sports chair David Hill reported receiving an email from a high-ranking NASCAR official whose identity he chose to conceal, stating that Digger could have been the cause of ratings declines for Fox's NASCAR coverage. Hill said "It was because of Digger that people were turning off in droves because they couldn't stand it, I said, I'm so sorry. If I'd known, I never would have created him. I didn't realize how insidious he was. It's the biggest crock of shit I've ever heard."

Among the reasons of criticism is the purpose of the character's usage. Though it was at one time commonplace for networks to create mascots for sports coverage to incorporate an educational and entertaining element into their coverage, which was the case with Peter Puck, Digger was created purely to add entertainment to the broadcast and reach out to a younger audience. Some NASCAR fans accused Fox of dumbing down and fluffing its coverage in order to gain revenue from Digger merchandise sales.

Despite continuous outrage from the NASCAR fan community, as well as talk from the NASCAR community that the Fan Council was not pleased with the situation, Fox did not announce any plans to drop the usage of the characters, and even had posted pictures of holiday-themed versions of the Digger die-cast in 2009 and 2010. In response to the comments, in 2010, the Digger cartoon was not shown during pre-race shows and Digger appeared less often at the bottom of the screen. Throughout the 2011 season as well as the 2012 Budweiser Shootout and Daytona 500, Digger appeared very sparingly, usually only during commercial bumpers. As of the 2012 Subway Fresh Fit 500, all appearances and references to Digger were dropped entirely from Fox's NASCAR broadcasts. However, nods to it occasionally came up (for example, at the Talladega race in 2014, when Carl Edwards showed debris on his firesuit, Mike Joy commented that he hoped that nothing had happened to Digger, to which Darrell Waltrip responded, "Digger's retired").

Digger made a cameo appearance in the 2009 20th Century Fox film Alvin and the Chipmunks: The Squeakquel. He also made an appearance in the Fox NFL Sunday introduction during the December 20, 2009 broadcast, in which the Chipmunks also made an appearance (20th Century Fox was then a corporate sister to the Fox network through News Corporation, 20th Century Fox was sold to the Walt Disney Company in 2019).

=== Commercial bias ===
In the starting grid for the 2001 Budweiser Shootout at Daytona International Speedway (which used 3D representations of the cars), Fox showed only the logos on the hoods of cars that had paid the network to advertise during the race. For instance, the Budweiser logo on the No. 8 car of Dale Earnhardt Jr. and The Home Depot logo on the No. 20 car of Tony Stewart were shown, but Miller Lite on the No. 2 car of Rusty Wallace was not. After outcry from some of the excluded companies, full logo graphics were restored to all cars four days later for the Gatorade Twin 125s telecast.

The computer-generated cars used initially on the starting grid and top-five standings when going to commercial break were phased out from main broadcast use and were discontinued entirely in 2005 with the exception of the Daytona 500 starting grid (which featured the computer-generated cars).

In 2012, Fox aired "In the Rear View Mirror" segments during the pre-race, showing computer-generated re-enactments of events during the 2012 season (most notably Juan Pablo Montoya's crash into a jet dryer at the Daytona 500), the intro sequence introduced in 2013 also incorporates CGI cars.

In the late 2010s and early 2020s, FOX was criticized by fans for heavily using crash footage for their ads. For example, Ryan Newman's massive accident from the previous years' Daytona 500 was used in many ads in 2021, and some fans interpreted this as a cash-grab from FOX attempting to make crashes the selling point of the events and not the racing itself.

=== End of the 2001 Daytona 500 and Dale Earnhardt's death ===
The 2001 Daytona 500, which was the first NASCAR points race ever telecast by Fox, also brought an unrelated controversy. At the end of that race, Fox concluded coverage shortly after Dale Earnhardt, who was fatally injured in a crash on the last lap of the race, was admitted to Halifax Health Medical Center in Daytona Beach, Florida. The network provided no updates on his condition at the time of the 5:15 p.m. Eastern Time sign-off (although no information was available at that time), and continued airing regular programming (with the animated series Futurama) at the moment Earnhardt's death was confirmed at a press conference held at 7:00 p.m. Eastern Time. NASCAR's other broadcast network partner, NBC, delayed a commercial break during an NBA telecast and ESPN (which aired the Craftsman Truck Series at the time) had coverage of Earnhardt's death and the aftermath that was both earlier and much more extensive. Fox News Channel and Fox Sports Net, however, did break into programming to announce the seven-time champion's passing, with Chris Myers providing reports on FSN programs.

Shortly after the race, Hill explained to the Associated Press that the network had gone over its allotted time – as the result of an 18-car pileup on the back straightaway on lap 173 that led to the race being red-flagged for lengthy cleanup – and that continuing to cover the story would be too morbid. Producer Neil Goldberg also said Fox Sports staffers were not allowed near the crash scene.

When ESPN presented a tribute feature in remembrance of the ten-year anniversary of Earnhardt's death in 2011, it showed footage of the crash and aftermath, that looked like part of the live telecast. However, it was stamped with "WFTV,” the calls of the Cox-owned ABC affiliate in Orlando, Florida (Orlando and Daytona Beach share the same media market, and ABC's corporate parent The Walt Disney Company owns 80% of ESPN). How footage from Fox's NASCAR coverage got credited to the local affiliate of another network has not been made public, though it was likely that since none of the footage is similar to that of Fox's, the last lap was filmed by WFTV for their own local newscasts, intended originally as B-roll to add "color" to their post-race coverage of the Daytona 500.

== Nielsen ratings ==
=== Top 10 races since 2011 ===
Rank	Date	Race	Viewers (millions)	TV Rating
1	March 1, 2015	QuikTrip 500	9.5	5.6
2	February 23, 2014	Daytona 500	9.3	5.6
3	February 18, 2018	Daytona 500	9.3	5.3
4	March 4, 2012	Subway Fresh Fit 500	9.2	5.6
5	February 17, 2019	Daytona 500	9.2	5.3
6	March 3, 2013	Subway Fresh Fit 500	9.1	5.3
7	April 17, 2011	Aaron's 499	9.0	5.2
8	March 2, 2014	The Profit on CNBC 500	8.8	5.3
9	March 11, 2012	Kobalt Tools 400	8.5	5.2
10	May 6, 2012	Aaron's 499	8.4	5.1

== Race broadcasts ==
=== 2001–2006: Fox and FX ===
==== Cup Series ====
Year	Date	Event	Track	Network	Coverage	Commentary		Pit Reporters	Host	Analysts
Year	Date	Event	Track	Network	Coverage	Lap-by-lap	Color	Pit Reporters	Host	Analysts
2001	February 11	Budweiser Shootout	Daytona	Fox	Live	Mike Joy	Darrell Waltrip; Larry McReynolds	Dick Berggren; Steve Byrnes; Matt Yocum; Jeanne Zelasko	Chris Myers	Darrell Waltrip; Jeff Hammond; Ken Squier
2001	February 15	Gatorade Twin 125s	Daytona	FSN	Live	Mike Joy	Darrell Waltrip; Larry McReynolds	Dick Berggren; Steve Byrnes; Matt Yocum; Jeanne Zelasko	Chris Myers	Jeff Hammond; Ken Squier
2001	February 18	Daytona 500	Daytona	Fox	Live	Mike Joy	Darrell Waltrip; Larry McReynolds	Dick Berggren; Steve Byrnes; Matt Yocum; Jeanne Zelasko	Chris Myers	Darrell Waltrip; Jeff Hammond; Ken Squier
2001	February 25	Rockingham	Rockingham	Fox	Live	Mike Joy	Darrell Waltrip; Larry McReynolds	Dick Berggren; Steve Byrnes; Matt Yocum; Jeanne Zelasko	Chris Myers	Darrell Waltrip; Jeff Hammond
2001	February 26	Dura Lube 400	Rockingham	FX (Note: The 2001 Dura Lube 400 saw coverage start on Fox on Sunday but moved to FX on Monday due to a Rain Delay. Jeanne Zelasko was replaced on Monday by Jeff Hammond and Chris Myers did not appear.)	Live	Mike Joy	Darrell Waltrip; Larry McReynolds	Dick Berggren; Steve Byrnes; Matt Yocum; Jeff Hammond	—N/a	—N/a
2001	March 4	UAW-Daimler Chrysler 400	Las Vegas	Fox	Live	Mike Joy	Darrell Waltrip; Larry McReynolds	Dick Berggren; Steve Byrnes; Matt Yocum; Jeanne Zelasko	Chris Myers	Darrell Waltrip; Jeff Hammond
2001	March 11	Cracker Barrel Old Country Store 500	Atlanta	Fox	Live	Mike Joy	Darrell Waltrip; Larry McReynolds	Dick Berggren; Steve Byrnes; Matt Yocum; Jeanne Zelasko	Chris Myers	Darrell Waltrip; Jeff Hammond
2001	March 18	Carolina Dodge Dealers 400	Darlington	Fox	Live	Mike Joy	Darrell Waltrip; Larry McReynolds	Dick Berggren; Steve Byrnes; Matt Yocum; Jeanne Zelasko	Chris Myers	Darrell Waltrip; Jeff Hammond
2001	March 25	Food City 500	Bristol	Fox	Live	Mike Joy	Darrell Waltrip; Larry McReynolds	Dick Berggren; Steve Byrnes; Matt Yocum; Jeanne Zelasko	Chris Myers	Darrell Waltrip; Jeff Hammond
2001	April 1	Harrah's 500	Texas	Fox	Live	Mike Joy	Darrell Waltrip; Larry McReynolds	Dick Berggren; Steve Byrnes; Matt Yocum; Jeanne Zelasko	Chris Myers	Darrell Waltrip; Jeff Hammond
2001	April 8	Virginia 500	Martinsville	Fox	Live	Mike Joy	Darrell Waltrip; Larry McReynolds	Dick Berggren; Steve Byrnes; Matt Yocum	Chris Myers	Darrell Waltrip; Jeff Hammond
2001	April 22	Talladega 500	Talladega	Fox	Live	Mike Joy	Darrell Waltrip; Larry McReynolds	Dick Berggren; Steve Byrnes; Matt Yocum; Jeanne Zelasko	Chris Myers	Darrell Waltrip; Jeff Hammond
2001	April 29	NAPA Auto Parts 500	California	Fox	Live	Mike Joy	Darrell Waltrip; Larry McReynolds	Dick Berggren; Steve Byrnes; Matt Yocum; Jeanne Zelasko	Chris Myers	Darrell Waltrip; Jeff Hammond
2001	May 5	Pontiac Excitement 400	Richmond	FX	Live	Mike Joy	Darrell Waltrip; Larry McReynolds	Dick Berggren; Steve Byrnes; Matt Yocum; Jeanne Zelasko	Chris Myers	Darrell Waltrip; Jeff Hammond
2001	May 19	No Bull Sprint	Charlotte	FX	Live	Mike Joy	Darrell Waltrip; Larry McReynolds	Dick Berggren; Steve Byrnes; Matt Yocum	Chris Myers	Darrell Waltrip; Jeff Hammond
2001	May 19	Winston Open	Charlotte	FX	Live	Mike Joy	Darrell Waltrip; Larry McReynolds	Dick Berggren; Steve Byrnes; Matt Yocum	Chris Myers	Darrell Waltrip; Jeff Hammond
2001	May 19–20 (Note: The 2001 The Winston was started on May 19th but finished in the early hours of May 20th due to a rain delay.)	The Winston	Charlotte	FX	Live	Mike Joy	Darrell Waltrip; Larry McReynolds	Dick Berggren; Steve Byrnes; Matt Yocum	Chris Myers	Darrell Waltrip; Jeff Hammond
2001	May 26	Coca-Cola 600	Charlotte	Fox	Live	Mike Joy	Darrell Waltrip; Larry McReynolds	Dick Berggren; Steve Byrnes; Matt Yocum; Jeanne Zelasko	Chris Myers	Darrell Waltrip; Jeff Hammond
2001	June 3	MBNA Platinum 400	Dover	Fox	Live	Mike Joy	Darrell Waltrip; Larry McReynolds	Dick Berggren; Steve Byrnes; Matt Yocum	Chris Myers	Darrell Waltrip; Jeff Hammond
2001	June 10	Kmart 400	Michigan	FX	Live	Mike Joy	Darrell Waltrip; Larry McReynolds	Dick Berggren; Steve Byrnes; Matt Yocum	Chris Myers	Darrell Waltrip; Jeff Hammond
2001	June 17	Pocono 500	Pocono	Fox	Live	Mike Joy	Darrell Waltrip; Larry McReynolds	Dick Berggren; Steve Byrnes; Matt Yocum	Chris Myers	Darrell Waltrip; Jeff Hammond
2001	June 24	Dodge/Save Mart 350	Sonoma	Fox	Live	Mike Joy	Darrell Waltrip; Larry McReynolds	Dick Berggren; Steve Byrnes; Matt Yocum; Jeanne Zelasko	Chris Myers	Darrell Waltrip; Jeff Hammond

Race	Network	Lap-by-lap	Color commentator(s)	
2002 NASCAR Winston Cup Series
Rockingham	Fox	Mike Joy	Darrell Waltrip	Larry McReynolds
Las Vegas	Fox	Mike Joy	Darrell Waltrip	Larry McReynolds
Atlanta	Fox	Mike Joy	Darrell Waltrip	Larry McReynolds
Darlington	Fox	Mike Joy	Darrell Waltrip	Larry McReynolds
Bristol	Fox	Mike Joy	Darrell Waltrip	Larry McReynolds
Texas	Fox/FX (Note: The 2002 Samsung/RadioShack 500 at Texas postponed to Monday and broadcast on FX and some Fox affiliates.)	Mike Joy	Darrell Waltrip	Larry McReynolds
Martinsville	FX	Mike Joy	Darrell Waltrip	Larry McReynolds
Talladega	Fox	Mike Joy	Darrell Waltrip	Larry McReynolds
California	Fox	Mike Joy	Darrell Waltrip	Larry McReynolds
Richmond	FX	Mike Joy	Darrell Waltrip	Larry McReynolds
The Winston	FX	Mike Joy	Darrell Waltrip	Larry McReynolds
Charlotte	Fox	Mike Joy	Darrell Waltrip	Larry McReynolds
Dover	FX	Mike Joy	Darrell Waltrip	Larry McReynolds
Pocono	Fox	Mike Joy	Darrell Waltrip	Larry McReynolds
Michigan	Fox	Mike Joy	Darrell Waltrip	Larry McReynolds
Sonoma	Fox	Mike Joy	Darrell Waltrip	Larry McReynolds
Daytona	Fox	Mike Joy	Darrell Waltrip	Larry McReynolds
2003 NASCAR Winston Cup Series
Shootout	Fox	Mike Joy	Darrell Waltrip	Larry McReynolds
Twin 125s	FX	Mike Joy	Darrell Waltrip	Larry McReynolds
Daytona 500	Fox	Mike Joy	Darrell Waltrip	Larry McReynolds
Rockingham	Fox	Mike Joy	Darrell Waltrip	Larry McReynolds
Las Vegas	Fox	Mike Joy	Darrell Waltrip	Larry McReynolds
Atlanta	Fox	Mike Joy	Darrell Waltrip	Larry McReynolds
Darlington	Fox	Mike Joy	Darrell Waltrip	Larry McReynolds
Bristol	Fox	Mike Joy	Darrell Waltrip	Larry McReynolds
Texas	Fox	Mike Joy	Darrell Waltrip	Larry McReynolds
Talladega	Fox	Mike Joy	Darrell Waltrip	Larry McReynolds
Martinsville	Fox	Mike Joy	Darrell Waltrip	Larry McReynolds
Richmond	FX	Mike Joy	Darrell Waltrip	Larry McReynolds
The Winston	FX	Mike Joy	Darrell Waltrip	Larry McReynolds
Charlotte	Fox	Mike Joy	Darrell Waltrip	Larry McReynolds
Dover	FX	Mike Joy	Darrell Waltrip	Larry McReynolds
Pocono	Fox	Mike Joy	Darrell Waltrip	Larry McReynolds
Michigan	Fox	Mike Joy	Darrell Waltrip	Larry McReynolds
Sonoma	Fox	Mike Joy	Darrell Waltrip	Larry McReynolds
2004 NASCAR Nextel Cup Series
Rockingham	Fox	Mike Joy	Darrell Waltrip	Larry McReynolds
Las Vegas	Fox	Mike Joy	Darrell Waltrip	Larry McReynolds
Atlanta	Fox	Mike Joy	Darrell Waltrip	Larry McReynolds
Darlington	Fox	Mike Joy	Darrell Waltrip	Larry McReynolds
Bristol	Fox	Mike Joy	Darrell Waltrip	Larry McReynolds
Texas	Fox	Mike Joy	Darrell Waltrip	Larry McReynolds
Martinsville	Fox	Mike Joy	Darrell Waltrip	Larry McReynolds
Talladega	Fox	Mike Joy	Darrell Waltrip	Larry McReynolds
California	Fox	Mike Joy	Darrell Waltrip	Larry McReynolds
Richmond	FX	Mike Joy	Darrell Waltrip	Larry McReynolds
All-Star	FX	Mike Joy	Darrell Waltrip	Larry McReynolds
Charlotte	Fox	Mike Joy	Darrell Waltrip	Larry McReynolds
Dover	FX	Mike Joy	Darrell Waltrip	Larry McReynolds
Pocono	Fox	Mike Joy	Darrell Waltrip	Larry McReynolds
Michigan	Fox	Mike Joy	Darrell Waltrip	Larry McReynolds
Sonoma	Fox	Mike Joy	Darrell Waltrip	Larry McReynolds
Daytona	Fox	Mike Joy	Darrell Waltrip	Larry McReynolds
2005 NASCAR Nextel Cup Series
Shootout	Fox	Mike Joy	Darrell Waltrip	Larry McReynolds
Duel	FX	Mike Joy	Darrell Waltrip	Larry McReynolds
Daytona 500	Fox	Mike Joy	Darrell Waltrip	Larry McReynolds
California	Fox	Mike Joy	Darrell Waltrip	Larry McReynolds
Las Vegas	Fox	Mike Joy	Darrell Waltrip	Larry McReynolds
Atlanta	Fox	Mike Joy	Darrell Waltrip	Larry McReynolds
Bristol	Fox	Mike Joy	Darrell Waltrip	Larry McReynolds
Martinsville	Fox	Mike Joy	Darrell Waltrip	Larry McReynolds
Texas	Fox	Mike Joy	Darrell Waltrip	Larry McReynolds
Phoenix	Fox	Mike Joy	Darrell Waltrip	Larry McReynolds
Talladega	Fox	Mike Joy	Darrell Waltrip	Larry McReynolds
Darlington	Fox	Mike Joy	Darrell Waltrip	Larry McReynolds
Richmond	FX	Mike Joy	Darrell Waltrip	Larry McReynolds
All-Star	FX	Mike Joy	Darrell Waltrip	Larry McReynolds
Charlotte	Fox	Mike Joy	Darrell Waltrip	Larry McReynolds
Dover	FX	Mike Joy	Darrell Waltrip	Larry McReynolds
Pocono	Fox	Mike Joy	Darrell Waltrip	Larry McReynolds
Michigan	Fox	Mike Joy	Darrell Waltrip	Larry McReynolds
Sonoma	Fox	Mike Joy	Darrell Waltrip	Larry McReynolds
2006 NASCAR Nextel Cup Series
California	Fox	Mike Joy	Darrell Waltrip	Larry McReynolds
Las Vegas	Fox	Mike Joy	Darrell Waltrip	Larry McReynolds
2006 Golden Corral 500	Fox/FX (Note: The 2006 Golden Corral 500 at Atlanta was moved to FX, as well as some Fox affiliates, due to rain delays.)	Mike Joy	Darrell Waltrip	Larry McReynolds
Bristol	Fox	Mike Joy	Darrell Waltrip	Larry McReynolds
Martinsville	Fox	Mike Joy	Darrell Waltrip	Larry McReynolds
Texas	Fox/FX (Note: The 2006 Samsung/RadioShack 500 at Texas was moved to FX, as well as some Fox affiliates, due to rain delays.)	Mike Joy	Darrell Waltrip	Larry McReynolds
Phoenix	Fox	Mike Joy	Darrell Waltrip	Larry McReynolds
Talladega	Fox	Mike Joy	Darrell Waltrip	Larry McReynolds
Richmond	FX	Mike Joy	Darrell Waltrip	Larry McReynolds
Darlington	Fox	Mike Joy	Darrell Waltrip	Larry McReynolds
All-Star	FX	Mike Joy	Darrell Waltrip	Larry McReynolds
Charlotte	Fox	Mike Joy	Darrell Waltrip	Larry McReynolds
Dover	FX	Mike Joy	Darrell Waltrip	Larry McReynolds
Pocono	Fox	Mike Joy	Darrell Waltrip	Larry McReynolds
Michigan	Fox	Mike Joy	Darrell Waltrip	Larry McReynolds
Sonoma	Fox	Mike Joy	Darrell Waltrip	Larry McReynolds
Daytona	Fox	Mike Joy	Darrell Waltrip	Larry McReynolds

==== Busch Series ====
Race	Network	Lap-by-lap	Color commentator(s)	
2001 NASCAR Busch Series
Daytona	Fox	Mike Joy	Larry McReynolds	Darrell Waltrip
Rockingham	FX	Mike Joy	Larry McReynolds	Darrell Waltrip
Las Vegas	FX	Mike Joy	Larry McReynolds	Darrell Waltrip
Atlanta	FX	Mike Joy	Larry McReynolds	Darrell Waltrip
Darlington	FX	Mike Joy	Larry McReynolds	Darrell Waltrip
Bristol	FX	Mike Joy	Larry McReynolds	Darrell Waltrip
Texas	Fox	Mike Joy	Larry McReynolds	Darrell Waltrip
Nashville	FX	Steve Byrnes	Larry McReynolds	Darrell Waltrip
Talladega	Fox	Mike Joy	Larry McReynolds	Darrell Waltrip
California	Fox	Mike Joy	Larry McReynolds	Darrell Waltrip
Richmond	FX	Mike Joy	Larry McReynolds	Darrell Waltrip
New Hampshire	FX	Mike Joy	Larry McReynolds	None
Nazareth	FX	Steve Byrnes	Larry McReynolds	None
Charlotte	Fox	Mike Joy	Larry McReynolds	Darrell Waltrip
Dover	FX	Mike Joy	Larry McReynolds	Darrell Waltrip
Kentucky	FX	Mike Joy	None	Darrell Waltrip
Milwaukee	FX	Mike Joy	Larry McReynolds	Jeff Hammond
2002 NASCAR Busch Series
Rockingham	Fox	Mike Joy	Larry McReynolds	Darrell Waltrip
Las Vegas	FX	Mike Joy	Larry McReynolds	Darrell Waltrip
Darlington	FX	Mike Joy	Larry McReynolds	Darrell Waltrip
Bristol	FX	Mike Joy	Larry McReynolds	Darrell Waltrip
Texas	Fox	Mike Joy	Larry McReynolds	Darrell Waltrip
Nashville 1	FX	Steve Byrnes	Larry McReynolds	None
Talladega	Fox	Mike Joy	Larry McReynolds	Darrell Waltrip
California	Fox	Mike Joy	Larry McReynolds	Darrell Waltrip
Richmond	FX	Mike Joy	Larry McReynolds	Darrell Waltrip
New Hampshire	FX	Mike Joy	Larry McReynolds	Jeff Hammond
Nazareth	FX	Steve Byrnes	Mike Wallace	None
Charlotte	Fox	Mike Joy	Larry McReynolds	Darrell Waltrip
Dover	FX	Mike Joy	Larry McReynolds	Darrell Waltrip
Nashville 2	FX	Steve Byrnes	None	Darrell Waltrip
Kentucky	FX	Steve Byrnes	None	Darrell Waltrip
Kentucky (Note: The 2002 Kroger 300 at Kentucky was started on Saturday with Byrnes and Waltrip on the call but postponed to Sunday after rain on lap 86. The remainder was tape delayed with Mark Garrow and Chad Little)	FX	Mark Garrow	None	Chad Little
Milwaukee	FX	Mike Joy	Larry McReynolds	Jeff Hammond
Daytona	FX	Mike Joy	Larry McReynolds	Darrell Waltrip
2003 NASCAR Busch Series
Daytona	Fox	Mike Joy	Larry McReynolds	Darrell Waltrip
Rockingham	FX	Mike Joy	Larry McReynolds	Darrell Waltrip
Las Vegas	FX	Mike Joy	Larry McReynolds	Darrell Waltrip
Darlington	FX	Mike Joy	Larry McReynolds	Darrell Waltrip
Bristol	FX	Mike Joy	Larry McReynolds	Darrell Waltrip
Texas	Fox	Mike Joy	Larry McReynolds	Darrell Waltrip
Talladega	Fox	Mike Joy	Larry McReynolds	Darrell Waltrip
Nashville	FX	Mark Garrow	Brett Bodine	None
California	Fox	Mike Joy	Larry McReynolds	Darrell Waltrip
Richmond	FX	Mike Joy	Larry McReynolds	Darrell Waltrip
Gateway	FX	Mike Joy	Larry McReynolds	Jeff Hammond
Nazareth	FX	Rick Allen	Hank Parker Jr.	None
Charlotte	FX	Mike Joy	Larry McReynolds	Darrell Waltrip
Dover	FX	Mike Joy	Larry McReynolds	Darrell Waltrip
Nashville	FX	Mark Garrow	Hank Parker Jr.	None
Kentucky	FX	Rick Allen	Hank Parker Jr.	None
Milwaukee	FX	Steve Byrnes	Larry McReynolds	None
2004 NASCAR Busch Series
Rockingham	FX	Mike Joy	Larry McReynolds	Darrell Waltrip
Las Vegas	FX	Mike Joy	Larry McReynolds	Darrell Waltrip
Darlington	FX	Mike Joy	Larry McReynolds	Darrell Waltrip
Bristol	Fox	Mike Joy	Larry McReynolds	Darrell Waltrip
Texas	Fox	Mike Joy	Larry McReynolds	Darrell Waltrip
Nashville	FX	Mike Joy	Larry McReynolds	None
Talladega	Fox	Mike Joy	Larry McReynolds	Darrell Waltrip
California	Fox	Mike Joy	Larry McReynolds	Darrell Waltrip
Gateway	FX	Steve Byrnes	Larry McReynolds	None
Richmond	FX	Mike Joy	Larry McReynolds	Darrell Waltrip
Nazareth	FX	Rick Allen	Phil Parsons	None
Charlotte	FX	Mike Joy	Larry McReynolds	Darrell Waltrip
Dover	FX	Mike Joy	Larry McReynolds	Darrell Waltrip
Dover (Note: The 2004 MBNA America 200 at Dover was postponed after lap 28 from Saturday to Monday. Waltrip did not call the Monday resumption.)	FX	Mike Joy	Larry McReynolds	None
Nashville	FX	Matt Yocum	Chad Little	None
Kentucky	FX	Matt Yocum	Chad Little	Randy LaJoie
Milwaukee	FX	Rick Allen	Phil Parsons	Johnny Benson
Daytona	FX	Mike Joy	Larry McReynolds	Darrell Waltrip
2005 NASCAR Busch Series
Daytona	Fox	Mike Joy	Larry McReynolds	Darrell Waltrip
California	FX	Mike Joy	Larry McReynolds	Darrell Waltrip
Mexico City	Fox	Mike Joy	Larry McReynolds	Darrell Waltrip
Las Vegas	FX	Mike Joy	Larry McReynolds	Darrell Waltrip
Atlanta	FX	Mike Joy	Larry McReynolds	Darrell Waltrip
Nashville	FX	Steve Byrnes	Larry McReynolds	None
Bristol	Fox/FX (Note: The 2005 Sharpie Professional 250 at Bristol was postponed to Monday due to rain. The race was aired by some Fox affiliates and FX.)	Mike Joy	Larry McReynolds	Jeff Hammond
Texas	Fox	Mike Joy	Larry McReynolds	Darrell Waltrip
Phoenix	FX	Mike Joy	Larry McReynolds	Darrell Waltrip
Talladega	Fox	Mike Joy	Larry McReynolds	Darrell Waltrip
Darlington	FX	Mike Joy	Larry McReynolds	Darrell Waltrip
Richmond	FX	Mike Joy	Larry McReynolds	Darrell Waltrip
Charlotte	FX	Mike Joy	Larry McReynolds	Darrell Waltrip
Dover	FX	Mike Joy	Larry McReynolds	Darrell Waltrip
Nashville	FX	Rick Allen	None	Phil Parsons
Kentucky	FX	Mark Garrow	Hermie Sadler	Phil Parsons
Milwaukee	FX	Rick Allen	Johnny Benson	Phil Parsons
2006 NASCAR Busch Series
California	FX	Mike Joy	Larry McReynolds	Darrell Waltrip
Mexico City	Fox	Mike Joy	Larry McReynolds	Darrell Waltrip
Las Vegas	FX	Mike Joy	Larry McReynolds	Darrell Waltrip
Atlanta	FX	Mike Joy	Larry McReynolds	Darrell Waltrip
Bristol	Fox	Mike Joy	Larry McReynolds	Darrell Waltrip
Texas	Fox	Mike Joy	Larry McReynolds	Darrell Waltrip
Nashville	FX	Steve Byrnes	Larry McReynolds	None
Phoenix	FX	Mike Joy	Larry McReynolds	Darrell Waltrip
Talladega	Fox	Mike Joy	Larry McReynolds	Darrell Waltrip
Richmond	FX	Mike Joy	Larry McReynolds	Darrell Waltrip
Darlington	FX	Mike Joy	Larry McReynolds	Darrell Waltrip
Charlotte	FX	Mike Joy	Larry McReynolds	Darrell Waltrip
Dover	FX	Mike Joy	Larry McReynolds	Darrell Waltrip
Nashville	FX	Rick Allen	Phil Parsons	Hermie Sadler
Kentucky	FX	Phil Parsons	Hank Parker Jr.	Hermie Sadler
Milwaukee	FX	Rick Allen	Phil Parsons	Johnny Benson
Daytona	FX	Mike Joy	Larry McReynolds	Darrell Waltrip

=== 2007–2014: Fox ===
From 2007 to 2014, Fox Sports only covered the first 13 races of the Cup Series, plus the Shootout, along with select Truck Series races from 2007 to 2009. All races aired exclusively on Fox. In August 2013, Speed was rebranded as Fox Sports 1. From the start of 2013 on Speed and continuing with branding for NASCAR events on the new channel (the Duels, the All-Star Race, and Truck Series races) falling under the NASCAR on Fox banner.

==== Cup Series ====
Race	Network	Lap-by-lap	Color commentator(s)	
2007 NASCAR Nextel Cup Series
Shootout	Fox	Mike Joy	Larry McReynolds	Darrell Waltrip
Daytona 500	Fox	Mike Joy	Larry McReynolds	Darrell Waltrip
California	Fox	Mike Joy	Larry McReynolds	Darrell Waltrip
Las Vegas	Fox	Mike Joy	Larry McReynolds	Darrell Waltrip
Atlanta	Fox	Mike Joy	Larry McReynolds	Darrell Waltrip
Bristol	Fox	Mike Joy	Larry McReynolds	Darrell Waltrip
Martinsville	Fox	Mike Joy	Larry McReynolds	Darrell Waltrip
Texas	Fox	Mike Joy	Larry McReynolds	Darrell Waltrip
Martinsville	Fox	Mike Joy	Larry McReynolds	Darrell Waltrip
Talladega	Fox	Mike Joy	Larry McReynolds	Darrell Waltrip
Richmond	Fox	Mike Joy	Larry McReynolds	Darrell Waltrip
Darlington	Fox	Mike Joy	Larry McReynolds	Darrell Waltrip
Charlotte	Fox	Mike Joy	Larry McReynolds	Darrell Waltrip
Dover	Fox	Mike Joy	Larry McReynolds	Darrell Waltrip
2008 NASCAR Sprint Cup Series
Shootout	Fox	Mike Joy	Larry McReynolds	Darrell Waltrip
Daytona 500	Fox	Mike Joy	Larry McReynolds	Darrell Waltrip
California	Fox	Mike Joy	Larry McReynolds	Darrell Waltrip
Las Vegas	Fox	Mike Joy	Larry McReynolds	Darrell Waltrip
Atlanta	Fox	Mike Joy	Larry McReynolds	Darrell Waltrip
Bristol	Fox	Mike Joy	Larry McReynolds	Darrell Waltrip
Martinsville	Fox	Mike Joy	Larry McReynolds	Darrell Waltrip
Texas	Fox	Mike Joy	Larry McReynolds	Darrell Waltrip
Martinsville	Fox	Mike Joy	Larry McReynolds	Darrell Waltrip
Talladega	Fox	Mike Joy	Larry McReynolds	Darrell Waltrip
Richmond	Fox	Mike Joy	Larry McReynolds	Darrell Waltrip
Darlington	Fox	Mike Joy	Larry McReynolds	Darrell Waltrip
Charlotte	Fox	Mike Joy	Larry McReynolds	Darrell Waltrip
Dover	Fox	Mike Joy	Larry McReynolds	Darrell Waltrip
2009 NASCAR Sprint Cup Series
Shootout	Fox	Mike Joy	Larry McReynolds	Darrell Waltrip
Daytona 500	Fox	Mike Joy	Larry McReynolds	Darrell Waltrip
California	Fox	Mike Joy	Larry McReynolds	Darrell Waltrip
Las Vegas	Fox	Mike Joy	Larry McReynolds	Darrell Waltrip
Atlanta	Fox	Mike Joy	Larry McReynolds	Darrell Waltrip
Bristol	Fox	Mike Joy	Larry McReynolds	Darrell Waltrip
Martinsville	Fox	Mike Joy	Larry McReynolds	Darrell Waltrip
Texas	Fox	Mike Joy	Larry McReynolds	Darrell Waltrip
Martinsville	Fox	Mike Joy	Larry McReynolds	Darrell Waltrip
Talladega	Fox	Mike Joy	Larry McReynolds	Darrell Waltrip
Richmond	Fox	Mike Joy	Larry McReynolds	Darrell Waltrip
Darlington	Fox	Mike Joy	Larry McReynolds	Darrell Waltrip
Charlotte	Fox	Mike Joy	Larry McReynolds	Darrell Waltrip
Dover	Fox	Mike Joy	Larry McReynolds	Darrell Waltrip
2010 NASCAR Sprint Cup Series
Shootout	Fox	Mike Joy	Larry McReynolds	Darrell Waltrip
Daytona 500	Fox	Mike Joy	Larry McReynolds	Darrell Waltrip
California	Fox	Mike Joy	Larry McReynolds	Darrell Waltrip
Las Vegas	Fox	Mike Joy	Larry McReynolds	Darrell Waltrip
Atlanta	Fox	Mike Joy	Larry McReynolds	Darrell Waltrip
Bristol	Fox	Mike Joy	Larry McReynolds	Darrell Waltrip
Martinsville	Fox	Mike Joy	Larry McReynolds	Darrell Waltrip
Phoenix	Fox	Mike Joy	Larry McReynolds	Darrell Waltrip
Texas	Fox	Mike Joy	Larry McReynolds	Darrell Waltrip
Talladega	Fox	Mike Joy	Larry McReynolds	Darrell Waltrip
Richmond	Fox	Mike Joy	Larry McReynolds	Darrell Waltrip
Darlington	Fox	Mike Joy	Larry McReynolds	Darrell Waltrip
Dover	Fox	Mike Joy	Larry McReynolds	Darrell Waltrip
Charlotte	Fox	Mike Joy	Larry McReynolds	Darrell Waltrip
2011 NASCAR Sprint Cup Series
Shootout	Fox	Mike Joy	Larry McReynolds	Darrell Waltrip
Daytona 500	Fox	Mike Joy	Larry McReynolds	Darrell Waltrip
Phoenix	Fox	Mike Joy	Larry McReynolds	Darrell Waltrip
Las Vegas	Fox	Mike Joy	Larry McReynolds	Darrell Waltrip
Bristol	Fox	Mike Joy	Larry McReynolds	Darrell Waltrip
California	Fox	Mike Joy	Larry McReynolds	Darrell Waltrip
Martinsville	Fox	Mike Joy	Larry McReynolds	Darrell Waltrip
Texas	Fox	Mike Joy	Larry McReynolds	Darrell Waltrip
Talladega	Fox	Mike Joy	Larry McReynolds	Darrell Waltrip
Richmond	Fox	Mike Joy	Larry McReynolds	Darrell Waltrip
Darlington	Fox	Mike Joy	Larry McReynolds	Darrell Waltrip
Dover	Fox	Mike Joy	Larry McReynolds	Darrell Waltrip
Charlotte	Fox	Mike Joy	Larry McReynolds	Darrell Waltrip
Kansas	Fox	Mike Joy	Larry McReynolds	Darrell Waltrip
2012 NASCAR Sprint Cup Series
Shootout	Fox	Mike Joy	Larry McReynolds	Darrell Waltrip
Daytona	Fox	Mike Joy	Larry McReynolds	Darrell Waltrip
Phoenix	Fox	Mike Joy	Larry McReynolds	Darrell Waltrip
Las Vegas	Fox	Mike Joy	Larry McReynolds	Darrell Waltrip
Bristol	Fox	Mike Joy	Larry McReynolds	Darrell Waltrip
California	Fox	Mike Joy	Larry McReynolds	Darrell Waltrip
Martinsville	Fox	Mike Joy	Larry McReynolds	Darrell Waltrip
Texas	Fox	Mike Joy	Larry McReynolds	Darrell Waltrip
Kansas	Fox	Mike Joy	Larry McReynolds	Darrell Waltrip
Richmond	Fox	Mike Joy	Larry McReynolds	Darrell Waltrip
Talladega	Fox	Mike Joy	Larry McReynolds	Darrell Waltrip
Darlington	Fox	Mike Joy	Larry McReynolds	Darrell Waltrip
Charlotte	Fox	Mike Joy	Larry McReynolds	Darrell Waltrip
Dover	Fox	Mike Joy	Larry McReynolds	Darrell Waltrip
2013 NASCAR Sprint Cup Series
Shootout	Fox	Mike Joy	Larry McReynolds	Darrell Waltrip
Daytona 500	Fox	Mike Joy	Larry McReynolds	Darrell Waltrip
Phoenix	Fox	Mike Joy	Larry McReynolds	Darrell Waltrip
Las Vegas	Fox	Mike Joy	Larry McReynolds	Darrell Waltrip
Bristol	Fox	Mike Joy	Larry McReynolds	Darrell Waltrip
California	Fox	Mike Joy	Larry McReynolds	Darrell Waltrip
Martinsville	Fox	Mike Joy	Larry McReynolds	Darrell Waltrip
Texas	Fox	Mike Joy	Larry McReynolds	Darrell Waltrip
Kansas	Fox	Mike Joy	Larry McReynolds	Darrell Waltrip
Richmond	Fox	Mike Joy	Larry McReynolds	Darrell Waltrip
Talladega	Fox	Mike Joy	Larry McReynolds	Darrell Waltrip
Darlington	Fox	Mike Joy	Larry McReynolds	Darrell Waltrip
Charlotte	Fox	Mike Joy	Larry McReynolds	Darrell Waltrip
Dover	Fox	Mike Joy	Larry McReynolds	Darrell Waltrip
2014 NASCAR Sprint Cup Series
Unlimited	Fox	Mike Joy	Larry McReynolds	Darrell Waltrip
Duels	FS1	Mike Joy	Larry McReynolds	Darrell Waltrip
Daytona 500	Fox	Mike Joy	Larry McReynolds	Darrell Waltrip
Phoenix	Fox	Mike Joy	Larry McReynolds	Darrell Waltrip
Las Vegas	Fox	Mike Joy	Larry McReynolds	Darrell Waltrip
Bristol	Fox/FS1 (Note: Started on Fox but finished on FS1 due to rain delays.)	Mike Joy	Larry McReynolds	Darrell Waltrip
California	Fox	Mike Joy	Larry McReynolds	Darrell Waltrip
Martinsville	Fox	Mike Joy	Larry McReynolds	Darrell Waltrip
Texas	Fox	Mike Joy	Larry McReynolds	Darrell Waltrip
Darlington	Fox	Mike Joy	Larry McReynolds	Darrell Waltrip
Richmond	Fox	Mike Joy	Larry McReynolds	Darrell Waltrip
Talladega	Fox	Mike Joy	Larry McReynolds	Darrell Waltrip
Kansas	Fox	Mike Joy	Larry McReynolds	Darrell Waltrip
All-Star	FS1	Mike Joy	Larry McReynolds	Darrell Waltrip
Charlotte	Fox	Mike Joy	Larry McReynolds	Darrell Waltrip
Dover	Fox	Mike Joy	Larry McReynolds	Darrell Waltrip

==== Truck Series ====
Race	Network	Lap-by-lap	Color commentator(s)	
2007 NASCAR Craftsman Truck Series
Martinsville	Fox	Rick Allen	Phil Parsons	Darrell Waltrip
Mansfield	Fox	Rick Allen	Phil Parsons	None
2008 NASCAR Craftsman Truck Series
California	Fox	Rick Allen	Phil Parsons	Darrell Waltrip
Martinsville	Fox	Rick Allen	Phil Parsons	Darrell Waltrip
2009 NASCAR Camping World Truck Series
California	Fox	Mike Joy	Larry McReynolds	Darrell Waltrip
2013 NASCAR Camping World Truck Series
Michigan	FS1	Rick Allen	Phil Parsons	Michael Waltrip
Bristol	FS1	Rick Allen	Phil Parsons	Michael Waltrip
Mosport	FS1	Rick Allen	Phil Parsons	Michael Waltrip
Iowa	FS1	Rick Allen	Phil Parsons	Michael Waltrip
Chicagoland	FS1	Rick Allen	Phil Parsons	Michael Waltrip
Las Vegas	FS1	Rick Allen	Phil Parsons	Michael Waltrip
Talladega	FS1	Rick Allen	Phil Parsons	Michael Waltrip
Martinsville	FS1	Rick Allen	Phil Parsons	Michael Waltrip
Texas	FS1	Rick Allen	Phil Parsons	Michael Waltrip
Phoenix	FS1	Rick Allen	Phil Parsons	Michael Waltrip
Homestead	FS1	Rick Allen	Phil Parsons	Michael Waltrip
2014 NASCAR Camping World Truck Series
Daytona	FS1	Rick Allen	Phil Parsons	Michael Waltrip
Martinsville	FS1	Rick Allen	Phil Parsons	Michael Waltrip
Kansas	FS1	Rick Allen	Phil Parsons	Michael Waltrip
Charlotte	FS1	Rick Allen	Phil Parsons	Michael Waltrip
Dover	FS1	Rick Allen	Phil Parsons	Michael Waltrip
Texas	FS1	Rick Allen	Phil Parsons	Michael Waltrip
Gateway	FS1	Rick Allen	Phil Parsons	Michael Waltrip
Kentucky	FS1	Rick Allen	Phil Parsons	Michael Waltrip
Iowa	FS1	Rick Allen	Phil Parsons	Michael Waltrip
Eldora	FS1	Rick Allen	Phil Parsons	Michael Waltrip
Pocono	FS1	Steve Byrnes	Phil Parsons	Michael Waltrip
Michigan	FS1	Steve Byrnes	Phil Parsons	Michael Waltrip
Bristol	FS1	Steve Byrnes	Phil Parsons	Michael Waltrip
Chicagoland	FS1	Adam Alexander	Phil Parsons	Michael Waltrip
New Hampshire	FS1	Steve Byrnes	Phil Parsons	Michael Waltrip
Las Vegas	FS1	Adam Alexander	Phil Parsons	Michael Waltrip
Talladega	Fox	Adam Alexander	Phil Parsons	Michael Waltrip
Martinsville	FS1	Adam Alexander	Phil Parsons	Michael Waltrip
Texas	FS1	Adam Alexander	Phil Parsons	Michael Waltrip
Phoenix	FS1	Adam Alexander	Phil Parsons	Michael Waltrip
Homestead	FS1	Adam Alexander	Phil Parsons	Michael Waltrip

=== 2015–2024: Fox/FS1 ===
==== Cup Series ====
Race	Network	Lap-by-lap	Color commentator(s)	
2015 NASCAR Sprint Cup Series
Unlimited	Fox	Mike Joy	Larry McReynolds	Darrell Waltrip
Duels	FS1	Mike Joy	Larry McReynolds	Darrell Waltrip
Daytona 500	Fox	Mike Joy	Larry McReynolds	Darrell Waltrip
Atlanta	Fox	Mike Joy	Larry McReynolds	Darrell Waltrip
Las Vegas	Fox	Mike Joy	Larry McReynolds	Darrell Waltrip
Phoenix	Fox	Mike Joy	Larry McReynolds	Darrell Waltrip
California	Fox	Mike Joy	Larry McReynolds	Darrell Waltrip
Martinsville	FS1	Mike Joy	Larry McReynolds	Darrell Waltrip
Texas	Fox	Mike Joy	Larry McReynolds	Darrell Waltrip
Bristol	Fox/FS1 (Note: The 2015 Food City 500 at Bristol was delayed due to rain and finished on FS1.)	Mike Joy	Larry McReynolds	Darrell Waltrip
Richmond	Fox	Mike Joy	Larry McReynolds	Darrell Waltrip
Talladega	Fox	Mike Joy	Larry McReynolds	Darrell Waltrip
Kansas	FS1	Mike Joy	Larry McReynolds	Darrell Waltrip
All-Star	FS1	Mike Joy	Larry McReynolds	Darrell Waltrip
Charlotte	Fox	Mike Joy	Larry McReynolds	Darrell Waltrip
Dover	FS1	Mike Joy	Larry McReynolds	Darrell Waltrip
Pocono	FS1	Mike Joy	Larry McReynolds	Darrell Waltrip
Michigan	FS1	Mike Joy	Larry McReynolds	Darrell Waltrip
Sonoma	FS1	Mike Joy	Larry McReynolds	Darrell Waltrip
2016 NASCAR Sprint Cup Series
Unlimited	Fox	Mike Joy	Jeff Gordon	Darrell Waltrip
Duels	FS1	Mike Joy	Jeff Gordon	Darrell Waltrip
Daytona 500	Fox	Mike Joy	Jeff Gordon	Darrell Waltrip
Atlanta	Fox	Mike Joy	Jeff Gordon	Darrell Waltrip
Las Vegas	Fox	Mike Joy	Jeff Gordon	Darrell Waltrip
Phoenix	Fox	Mike Joy	Jeff Gordon	Darrell Waltrip
California	Fox	Mike Joy	Jeff Gordon	Darrell Waltrip
Martinsville	FS1	Mike Joy	Jeff Gordon	Darrell Waltrip
Texas	Fox	Mike Joy	Jeff Gordon	Darrell Waltrip
Bristol	Fox	Mike Joy	Jeff Gordon	Darrell Waltrip
Richmond	Fox	Mike Joy	Jeff Gordon	Darrell Waltrip
Talladega	Fox	Mike Joy	Jeff Gordon	Darrell Waltrip
Kansas	FS1	Mike Joy	Jeff Gordon	Darrell Waltrip
Dover	FS1	Mike Joy	Jeff Gordon	Darrell Waltrip
All-Star	FS1	Mike Joy	Jeff Gordon	Darrell Waltrip
Charlotte	Fox	Mike Joy	Jeff Gordon	Darrell Waltrip
Pocono	FS1	Mike Joy	Jeff Gordon	Darrell Waltrip
Michigan	FS1	Mike Joy	Jeff Gordon	Darrell Waltrip
Sonoma	FS1	Mike Joy	Jeff Gordon	Darrell Waltrip
2017 NASCAR Cup Series
Clash	FS1	Mike Joy	Jeff Gordon	Darrell Waltrip
Duels	FS1	Mike Joy	Jeff Gordon	Darrell Waltrip
Daytona 500	Fox	Mike Joy	Jeff Gordon	Darrell Waltrip
Atlanta	Fox	Mike Joy	Jeff Gordon	Darrell Waltrip
Las Vegas	Fox	Mike Joy	Jeff Gordon	Darrell Waltrip
Phoenix	Fox	Mike Joy	Jeff Gordon	Darrell Waltrip
California	Fox	Mike Joy	Jeff Gordon	Darrell Waltrip
Martinsville	FS1	Mike Joy	Jeff Gordon	Darrell Waltrip
Texas	Fox	Mike Joy	Jeff Gordon	Darrell Waltrip
Bristol	Fox	Mike Joy	Jeff Gordon	Darrell Waltrip
Richmond	Fox	Mike Joy	Jeff Gordon	Darrell Waltrip
Talladega	Fox	Mike Joy	Jeff Gordon	Darrell Waltrip
Kansas	FS1	Mike Joy	Jeff Gordon	Darrell Waltrip
All-Star	FS1	Mike Joy	Jeff Gordon	Darrell Waltrip
Charlotte	Fox	Mike Joy	Jeff Gordon	Darrell Waltrip
Dover	FS1	Mike Joy	Jeff Gordon	Darrell Waltrip
Pocono	FS1	Mike Joy	Jeff Gordon	Darrell Waltrip
Michigan	FS1	Mike Joy	Jeff Gordon	Darrell Waltrip
Sonoma	FS1	Mike Joy	Jeff Gordon	Darrell Waltrip
2018 NASCAR Cup Series
Clash	FS1	Mike Joy	Jeff Gordon	Darrell Waltrip
Duels	FS1	Mike Joy	Jeff Gordon	Darrell Waltrip
Daytona 500	Fox	Mike Joy	Jeff Gordon	Darrell Waltrip
Atlanta	Fox	Mike Joy	Jeff Gordon	Darrell Waltrip
Las Vegas	Fox	Mike Joy	Jeff Gordon	Darrell Waltrip
Phoenix	Fox	Mike Joy	Jeff Gordon	Darrell Waltrip
California	Fox	Mike Joy	Jeff Gordon	Darrell Waltrip
Martinsville	FS1	Mike Joy	Jeff Gordon	Darrell Waltrip
Texas	FS1	Mike Joy	Jeff Gordon	Darrell Waltrip
Bristol	Fox	Mike Joy	Jeff Gordon	Darrell Waltrip
Richmond	Fox	Mike Joy	Jeff Gordon	Darrell Waltrip
Talladega	Fox	Mike Joy	Jeff Gordon	Darrell Waltrip
Dover	FS1	Mike Joy	Jeff Gordon	Darrell Waltrip
Kansas	FS1	Mike Joy	Jeff Gordon	Darrell Waltrip
All-Star	FS1	Mike Joy	Jeff Gordon	Darrell Waltrip
Charlotte	Fox	Mike Joy	Jeff Gordon	Darrell Waltrip
Pocono	FS1	Mike Joy	Jeff Gordon	Darrell Waltrip
Michigan	Fox	Mike Joy	Jeff Gordon	Darrell Waltrip
Sonoma	FS1	Mike Joy	Jeff Gordon	Darrell Waltrip
2019 NASCAR Cup Series
Clash	FS1	Mike Joy	Jeff Gordon	Darrell Waltrip
Duels	FS1	Mike Joy	Jeff Gordon	Darrell Waltrip
Daytona 500	Fox	Mike Joy	Jeff Gordon	Darrell Waltrip
Atlanta	Fox	Mike Joy	Jeff Gordon	Darrell Waltrip
Las Vegas	Fox	Mike Joy	Jeff Gordon	Darrell Waltrip
Phoenix	Fox	Mike Joy	Jeff Gordon	Darrell Waltrip
California	Fox	Mike Joy	Jeff Gordon	Darrell Waltrip
Martinsville	FS1	Mike Joy	Jeff Gordon	Darrell Waltrip
Texas	Fox	Mike Joy	Jeff Gordon	Darrell Waltrip
Bristol	FS1	Mike Joy	Jeff Gordon	Darrell Waltrip
Richmond	Fox	Mike Joy	Jeff Gordon	Darrell Waltrip
Talladega	Fox	Mike Joy	Jeff Gordon	Darrell Waltrip
Dover	FS1	Mike Joy	Jeff Gordon	Darrell Waltrip
Kansas	FS1	Mike Joy	Jeff Gordon	Darrell Waltrip
All-Star	FS1	Mike Joy	Jeff Gordon	Darrell Waltrip
Charlotte	Fox	Mike Joy	Jeff Gordon	Darrell Waltrip
Pocono	FS1	Mike Joy	Jeff Gordon	Darrell Waltrip
Michigan	FS1	Mike Joy	Jeff Gordon	Darrell Waltrip
Sonoma	FS1	Mike Joy	Jeff Gordon	Darrell Waltrip
2020 NASCAR Cup Series
Clash	FS1	Mike Joy	Jeff Gordon	None
Duels	FS1	Mike Joy	Jeff Gordon	None
Daytona 500	Fox	Mike Joy	Jeff Gordon	None
Las Vegas	Fox	Mike Joy	Jeff Gordon	None
California	Fox	Mike Joy	Jeff Gordon	None
Phoenix	Fox	Mike Joy	Jeff Gordon	None
Darlington 1	Fox	Mike Joy	Jeff Gordon	None
Darlington 2	FS1	Mike Joy	Jeff Gordon	None
Charlotte 1	Fox	Mike Joy	Jeff Gordon	None
Charlotte 2	FS1	Mike Joy	Jeff Gordon	None
Bristol	FS1	Mike Joy	Jeff Gordon	None
Atlanta	Fox	Mike Joy	Jeff Gordon	None
Martinsville	FS1	Mike Joy	Jeff Gordon	None
Homestead	Fox	Mike Joy	Jeff Gordon	None
Talladega	Fox	Mike Joy	Jeff Gordon	None
Pocono 1	Fox	Mike Joy	Jeff Gordon	None
Pocono 2	FS1	Mike Joy	Jeff Gordon	None
Kentucky	FS1	Mike Joy	Jeff Gordon	None
All-Star	FS1	Mike Joy	Jeff Gordon	None
2021 NASCAR Cup Series
Clash	FS1	Mike Joy	Jeff Gordon	Clint Bowyer
Duels	FS1	Mike Joy	Jeff Gordon	Clint Bowyer
Daytona	Fox	Mike Joy	Jeff Gordon	Clint Bowyer
Daytona RC	Fox	Mike Joy	Jeff Gordon	Clint Bowyer
Homestead	Fox	Mike Joy	Jeff Gordon	Clint Bowyer
Las Vegas	Fox	Mike Joy	Jeff Gordon	Clint Bowyer
Phoenix	Fox	Mike Joy	Jeff Gordon	Clint Bowyer
Atlanta	Fox	Mike Joy	Jeff Gordon	Clint Bowyer
Bristol	Fox	Mike Joy	Jeff Gordon	Clint Bowyer
Martinsville	FS1	Mike Joy	Jeff Gordon	Clint Bowyer
Richmond	Fox	Mike Joy	Jeff Gordon	Clint Bowyer
Talladega	Fox	Mike Joy	Jeff Gordon	Clint Bowyer
Kansas	FS1	Mike Joy	Jeff Gordon	Clint Bowyer
Darlington	FS1	Mike Joy	Jeff Gordon	Clint Bowyer
Dover	FS1	Mike Joy	Jeff Gordon	Clint Bowyer
COTA	FS1	Mike Joy	Jeff Gordon	Clint Bowyer
Charlotte	Fox	Mike Joy	Jeff Gordon	Clint Bowyer
Sonoma	FS1	Mike Joy	Jeff Gordon	Clint Bowyer
All-Star	FS1	Mike Joy	Jeff Gordon	Clint Bowyer
2022 NASCAR Cup Series
Clash	Fox	Mike Joy	Clint Bowyer	Tony Stewart
Duels	FS1	Mike Joy	Clint Bowyer	Larry McReynolds
Daytona	Fox	Mike Joy	Clint Bowyer	Tony Stewart
California	Fox	Mike Joy	Clint Bowyer	Matt Kenseth
Las Vegas	Fox	Mike Joy	Clint Bowyer	Danica Patrick
Phoenix	Fox	Mike Joy	Clint Bowyer	Danica Patrick
Atlanta	Fox	Mike Joy	Clint Bowyer	Jeff Gordon
COTA	Fox	Mike Joy	Clint Bowyer	Tony Stewart
Richmond	Fox	Mike Joy	Clint Bowyer	Chad Knaus
Martinsville	FS1	Mike Joy	Clint Bowyer	Chad Knaus
Bristol	Fox	Mike Joy	Clint Bowyer	Darrell Waltrip
Talladega	Fox	Mike Joy	Clint Bowyer	Dale Earnhardt Jr.
Dover	FS1	Mike Joy	Clint Bowyer	Larry McReynolds
Darlington	FS1	Mike Joy	Clint Bowyer	Richard Petty (Stage 1); Bobby Labonte (Stage 2); Bill Elliott (Stage 3)
Kansas	FS1	Mike Joy	Clint Bowyer	Jamie McMurray
All-Star	FS1	Mike Joy	Clint Bowyer	Larry McReynolds; Frankie Muniz (Open)
Charlotte	Fox	Mike Joy	Clint Bowyer	Jamie McMurray
Gateway	FS1	Mike Joy	Clint Bowyer	Michael Waltrip; Kenny Wallace (Stage 2)
Sonoma	FS1	Mike Joy	Larry McReynolds	Tony Stewart
2023 NASCAR Cup Series
Clash	Fox	Mike Joy	Clint Bowyer	Tony Stewart
Duels	FS1	Mike Joy	Clint Bowyer	Tony Stewart
Daytona	Fox	Mike Joy	Clint Bowyer	Tony Stewart
California	Fox	Mike Joy	Clint Bowyer	Tony Stewart
Las Vegas	Fox	Mike Joy	Clint Bowyer	Danica Patrick
Phoenix	Fox	Mike Joy	Clint Bowyer	Danica Patrick
Atlanta	Fox	Mike Joy	Clint Bowyer	Tony Stewart
COTA	Fox	Mike Joy	Clint Bowyer	Kurt Busch; Guenther Steiner; Chase Elliott
Richmond	FS1	Mike Joy	Clint Bowyer	Larry McReynolds
Bristol Dirt	Fox	Mike Joy	Clint Bowyer	Tony Stewart
Martinsville	FS1	Mike Joy	Clint Bowyer	Bobby Labonte
Talladega	Fox	Mike Joy	Clint Bowyer	Tony Stewart
Dover	FS1	Mike Joy	Clint Bowyer	Rusty Wallace
Kansas	FS1	Mike Joy	Clint Bowyer	Kurt Busch
Darlington	FS1	Mike Joy	Clint Bowyer	Richard Petty (Stage 1); Kyle Petty (Stage 1); Carl Edwards (Stage 2); Bill Elliott (Stage 3)
All-Star	FS1	Mike Joy	Clint Bowyer	Larry McReynolds; Jamie McMurray (Open); Darrell Waltrip (All-Star)
Charlotte	Fox	Mike Joy	Clint Bowyer	Tony Stewart; Danny McBride (Stage 2)
Gateway	FS1	Mike Joy	Clint Bowyer	Michael Waltrip; Kenny Wallace (Stage 2)
Sonoma	FS1	Mike Joy	Clint Bowyer	Jamie McMurray
2024 NASCAR Cup Series
Clash	FS1	Mike Joy	Clint Bowyer	Kevin Harvick
Duels	FS1	Mike Joy	Clint Bowyer	Kevin Harvick
Daytona	Fox	Mike Joy	Clint Bowyer	Kevin Harvick
Atlanta	Fox	Mike Joy	Clint Bowyer	Kevin Harvick
Las Vegas	Fox	Mike Joy	Clint Bowyer	Kevin Harvick
Phoenix	Fox	Mike Joy	Clint Bowyer	Kevin Harvick
Bristol	Fox	Mike Joy	Clint Bowyer	Kevin Harvick
COTA	Fox	Mike Joy	Clint Bowyer	Kevin Harvick
Richmond	Fox	Mike Joy	Clint Bowyer	Kevin Harvick
Martinsville	FS1	Mike Joy	Clint Bowyer	Kevin Harvick
Texas	FS1	Mike Joy	Clint Bowyer	Kevin Harvick
Talladega	Fox	Mike Joy	Clint Bowyer	Kevin Harvick
Dover	FS1	Mike Joy	Clint Bowyer	Kevin Harvick
Kansas	FS1	Mike Joy	Clint Bowyer	Kevin Harvick
Darlington	FS1	Mike Joy	Clint Bowyer	Kevin Harvick
All-Star	FS1	Mike Joy	Clint Bowyer	Kevin Harvick
Charlotte	Fox	Mike Joy	Clint Bowyer	Kevin Harvick
Gateway	FS1	Mike Joy	Clint Bowyer	Kevin Harvick
Sonoma	Fox	Mike Joy	Clint Bowyer	Kevin Harvick

==== Xfinity Series ====
Race	Network	Lap-by-lap	Color commentator(s)	
2015 NASCAR Xfinity Series
Daytona	FS1	Adam Alexander	Michael Waltrip	Kevin Harvick
Atlanta	FS1	Adam Alexander	Michael Waltrip	Brad Keselowski
Las Vegas	FS1	Adam Alexander	Michael Waltrip	Kevin Harvick
Phoenix	Fox	Adam Alexander	Michael Waltrip	Brad Keselowski
California	FS1	Adam Alexander	Michael Waltrip	Clint Bowyer
Texas	FS1	Adam Alexander	Michael Waltrip	Jeff Gordon
Bristol	FS1	Adam Alexander	Michael Waltrip	Jeff Gordon
Richmond	FS1	Adam Alexander	Michael Waltrip	Brad Keselowski
Talladega	Fox	Adam Alexander	Michael Waltrip	Jeff Gordon
Iowa	FS1	Adam Alexander	Michael Waltrip	Phil Parsons
Charlotte	Fox	Adam Alexander	Michael Waltrip	Clint Bowyer
Dover	Fox	Adam Alexander	Michael Waltrip	Kevin Harvick
Michigan	FS1	Adam Alexander	Michael Waltrip	Danica Patrick
Chicagoland	FS1	Adam Alexander	Michael Waltrip	Larry McReynolds
2016 NASCAR Xfinity Series
Daytona	FS1	Adam Alexander	Michael Waltrip	Kevin Harvick
Atlanta	FS1	Adam Alexander	Michael Waltrip	Clint Bowyer
Las Vegas	FS1	Adam Alexander	Michael Waltrip	Clint Bowyer
Phoenix	Fox	Adam Alexander	Michael Waltrip	Joey Logano
California	FS1	Adam Alexander	Michael Waltrip	Brad Keselowski
Texas	FS1	Adam Alexander	Michael Waltrip	Carl Edwards
Bristol	FS1	Adam Alexander	Michael Waltrip	Brad Keselowski
Richmond	FS1	Adam Alexander	Michael Waltrip	Joey Logano
Talladega	Fox	Adam Alexander	Michael Waltrip	Denny Hamlin
Dover	Fox	Adam Alexander	Michael Waltrip	Brad Keselowski
Charlotte	FS1	Adam Alexander	Michael Waltrip	Clint Bowyer
Pocono	Fox	Adam Alexander	Michael Waltrip	Danica Patrick
Michigan	FS1	Adam Alexander	Michael Waltrip	Dale Earnhardt Jr.
Iowa	FS1	Adam Alexander	Michael Waltrip	Larry McReynolds
2017 NASCAR Xfinity Series
Daytona	FS1	Adam Alexander	Michael Waltrip	Kevin Harvick
Atlanta	FS1	Adam Alexander	Michael Waltrip	Chase Elliott
Las Vegas	FS1	Adam Alexander	Michael Waltrip	Jamie McMurray
Phoenix	Fox	Adam Alexander	Michael Waltrip	Kevin Harvick
California	FS1	Adam Alexander	Michael Waltrip	Brad Keselowski
Texas	Fox	Adam Alexander	Michael Waltrip	Brad Keselowski
Bristol	FS1	Adam Alexander	Michael Waltrip	Kevin Harvick
Richmond	FS1	Adam Alexander	Michael Waltrip	Joey Logano
Talladega	Fox	Adam Alexander	Michael Waltrip	Kevin Harvick
Charlotte	FS1	Adam Alexander	Michael Waltrip	Clint Bowyer
Dover	FS1	Adam Alexander	Michael Waltrip	Joey Logano
Pocono	Fox	Kevin Harvick	Clint Bowyer	Joey Logano
Michigan	FS1	Adam Alexander	Michael Waltrip	Austin Dillon
Iowa	FS1	Adam Alexander	Phil Parsons	Regan Smith
2018 NASCAR Xfinity Series
Daytona	FS1	Adam Alexander	Michael Waltrip	Brad Keselowski
Atlanta	FS1	Adam Alexander	Michael Waltrip	Chase Elliott
Las Vegas	FS1	Adam Alexander	Michael Waltrip	Brad Keselowski
Phoenix	FS1	Adam Alexander	Michael Waltrip	Ryan Blaney
California	FS1	Adam Alexander	Michael Waltrip	Brad Keselowski
Texas	Fox	Adam Alexander	Michael Waltrip	Clint Bowyer
Bristol	FS1	Adam Alexander	Michael Waltrip	Joey Logano
Richmond	FS1	Adam Alexander	Michael Waltrip	Kevin Harvick
Talladega	Fox	Kevin Harvick	Joey Logano	Clint Bowyer
Dover	FS1	Adam Alexander	Michael Waltrip	Austin Dillon
Charlotte	FS1	Adam Alexander	Michael Waltrip	Erik Jones
Pocono	FS1	Adam Alexander	Michael Waltrip	Jamie McMurray
Michigan	Fox	Adam Alexander	Michael Waltrip	Joey Logano
Iowa	FS1	Adam Alexander	Michael Waltrip	Regan Smith
2019 NASCAR Xfinity Series
Daytona	FS1	Adam Alexander	Michael Waltrip	Joey Logano
Atlanta	FS1	Adam Alexander	Jimmie Johnson	Kevin Harvick
Las Vegas	FS1	Adam Alexander	Brad Keselowski	Kevin Harvick
Phoenix	FS1	Adam Alexander	Erik Jones	Kevin Harvick
California	FS1	Adam Alexander	Brad Keselowski	Michael Waltrip
Texas	FS1	Adam Alexander	Austin Dillon	Kevin Harvick
Bristol	FS1	Adam Alexander	Clint Bowyer	Kevin Harvick
Richmond	FS1	Adam Alexander	Chad Knaus	Michael Waltrip
Talladega	FS1	Adam Alexander	Joey Logano	Kevin Harvick
Dover	FS1	Adam Alexander	Ryan Blaney	Michael Waltrip
Charlotte	FS1	Kevin Harvick	Joey Logano	Clint Bowyer
Pocono	FS1	Adam Alexander	Kurt Busch	Michael Waltrip
Michigan	FS1	Adam Alexander	Bubba Wallace	Kevin Harvick
Iowa	FS1	Adam Alexander	Regan Smith	Michael Waltrip
2020 NASCAR Xfinity Series
Daytona	FS1	Adam Alexander	Clint Bowyer	Brad Keselowski
Las Vegas	FS1	Adam Alexander	Austin Dillon	Michael Waltrip
California	FS1	Adam Alexander	Chad Knaus	Joey Logano
Phoenix	FS1	Adam Alexander	Clint Bowyer	Joey Logano
Darlington	FS1	Adam Alexander	Clint Bowyer	Michael Waltrip
Charlotte	FS1	Adam Alexander	Clint Bowyer	Jamie McMurray
Bristol	FS1	Adam Alexander	Kyle Busch	Kurt Busch
Atlanta	Fox	Adam Alexander	Clint Bowyer	Jamie McMurray
Homestead 1	Fox	Adam Alexander	Clint Bowyer	Jamie McMurray
Homestead 2	FS1	Adam Alexander	Michael Waltrip	Jamie McMurray
Talladega	FS1	Adam Alexander	Aric Almirola	Jamie McMurray
Pocono	FS1	Adam Alexander	Regan Smith	Jamie McMurray
Kentucky 1	FS1	Adam Alexander	Clint Bowyer	Chad Knaus
Kentucky 2	FS1	Adam Alexander	Clint Bowyer	Kurt Busch
2021 NASCAR Xfinity Series
Daytona	FS1	Adam Alexander	Clint Bowyer	Tony Stewart
Daytona RC	FS1	Adam Alexander	Drew Blickensderfer	Joey Logano
Homestead	FS1	Adam Alexander	Kurt Busch	Aric Almirola
Las Vegas	FS1	Adam Alexander	Kurt Busch	Joey Logano
Phoenix	FS1	Adam Alexander	Daniel Suárez	Joey Logano
Atlanta	FS1	Adam Alexander	Ryan Blaney	Tyler Reddick
Martinsville	FS1	Adam Alexander	Ryan Blaney	Austin Dillon
Talladega	Fox	Adam Alexander	Tyler Reddick	Joey Logano
Darlington	FS1	Adam Alexander	Erik Jones	Bubba Wallace
Dover	FS1	Adam Alexander	Kurt Busch	Brad Keselowski
COTA	FS1	Adam Alexander	Bubba Wallace	Ryan Blaney
Charlotte	FS1	Kevin Harvick	Joey Logano	Ryan Blaney
Mid-Ohio	FS1	Adam Alexander	Jamie McMurray	Michael Waltrip
Texas	FS1	Adam Alexander	Joey Logano	Brad Keselowski
2022 NASCAR Xfinity Series
Daytona	FS1	Adam Alexander	Denny Hamlin	Chad Knaus
California	FS1	Adam Alexander	Ryan Blaney	Joey Logano
Las Vegas	FS1	Adam Alexander	Ryan Blaney	Joey Logano
Phoenix	FS1	Adam Alexander	Daniel Suárez	Joey Logano
Atlanta	FS1	Adam Alexander	Brad Keselowski	Joey Logano
COTA	FS1	Adam Alexander	Kurt Busch	Joey Logano
Richmond	FS1	Adam Alexander	Daniel Suárez	Joey Logano
Martinsville	FS1	Adam Alexander	Austin Dillon	Erik Jones
Talladega	Fox	Adam Alexander	Austin Dillon	Kurt Busch
Dover	FS1	Adam Alexander	Brad Keselowski	Joey Logano
Darlington	FS1	Adam Alexander	Ryan Blaney	Joey Logano
Texas	FS1	Adam Alexander	Kevin Harvick	Joey Logano
Charlotte	FS1	Kevin Harvick	Ryan Blaney	Joey Logano
Portland	FS1	Adam Alexander	Jamie McMurray	Trevor Bayne
2023 NASCAR Xfinity Series
Daytona	FS1	Adam Alexander	Austin Dillon	Ryan Blaney
California	FS2	Adam Alexander	Joey Logano	Ryan Blaney
Las Vegas	FS1	Adam Alexander	Kevin Harvick	Ryan Blaney
Phoenix	FS1	Adam Alexander	Kevin Harvick	Joey Logano
Atlanta	FS1	Adam Alexander	Daniel Suárez	Joey Logano
COTA	FS1	Adam Alexander	Brad Keselowski	Joey Logano
Richmond	FS1	Adam Alexander	Kevin Harvick	Joey Logano
Martinsville	FS1	Adam Alexander	Brad Keselowski	Joey Logano
Talladega	FS1	Adam Alexander	Brad Keselowski	Joey Logano
Dover	FS1	Adam Alexander	Austin Dillon	Joey Logano
Darlington	Fox	Adam Alexander	Ryan Blaney	Michael Waltrip
Charlotte	FS1/FS2 (Note: The Alsco Uniforms 300 at Charlotte was postponed from May 27 to May 29, then delayed until after the postponed 2023 Coca-Cola 600 and finished on FS2.)	Adam Alexander	Jamie McMurray	Michael Waltrip
Portland	FS1	Adam Alexander	Jamie McMurray	Trevor Bayne
Sonoma	FS1	Adam Alexander	Kevin Harvick	Austin Cindric

==== Truck Series ====
Race	Network	Lap-by-lap	Color commentator(s)	
2015 NASCAR Camping World Truck Series
Daytona	FS1	Mike Joy	Phil Parsons	Michael Waltrip
Atlanta	FS1	Brian Till	Phil Parsons	Todd Bodine
Martinsville	FS1	Adam Alexander	Phil Parsons	Michael Waltrip
Kansas	FS1	Adam Alexander	Phil Parsons	Michael Waltrip
Charlotte	FS1	Adam Alexander	Phil Parsons	Michael Waltrip
Dover	FS1	Ralph Sheheen	Phil Parsons	Todd Bodine
Texas	FS1	Adam Alexander	Phil Parsons	Michael Waltrip
Gateway	FS1	Ralph Sheheen	Phil Parsons	Todd Bodine
Iowa	FS1	Brian Till	Phil Parsons	Todd Bodine
Kentucky	FS1	Ralph Sheheen	Phil Parsons	Michael Waltrip
Eldora	FS1	Ralph Sheheen	Phil Parsons	Michael Waltrip
Pocono	FS1	Vince Welch	Phil Parsons	Michael Waltrip
Michigan	FS1	Vince Welch	Phil Parsons	Michael Waltrip
Bristol	FS1	Adam Alexander	Phil Parsons	Michael Waltrip
Mosport	FS1	Ralph Sheheen	Phil Parsons	Michael Waltrip
Chicagoland	FS1	Ralph Sheheen	Phil Parsons	Michael Waltrip
New Hampshire	FS1	Vince Welch	Phil Parsons	Michael Waltrip
Las Vegas	FS1	Ralph Sheheen	Phil Parsons	Michael Waltrip
Talladega	Fox	Adam Alexander	Kevin Harvick	Michael Waltrip
Martinsville	FS1	Adam Alexander	Phil Parsons	Michael Waltrip
Texas	FS1	Ralph Sheheen	Phil Parsons	Michael Waltrip
Phoenix	FS1	Ralph Sheheen	Phil Parsons	Michael Waltrip
Homestead	FS1	Adam Alexander	Phil Parsons	Michael Waltrip
2016 NASCAR Camping World Truck Series
Daytona	FS1	Vince Welch	Phil Parsons	Michael Waltrip
Atlanta	FS1	Vince Welch	Phil Parsons	Michael Waltrip
Martinsville	FS1	Vince Welch	Phil Parsons	Michael Waltrip
Kansas	FS1	Vince Welch	Phil Parsons	Michael Waltrip
Dover	FS1	Vince Welch	Phil Parsons	Michael Waltrip
Charlotte	FS1	Vince Welch	Phil Parsons	Michael Waltrip
Texas	FS1	Vince Welch	Phil Parsons	Todd Bodine
Iowa	FBN/FS1 (Note: The 2016 M&M's 200 at Iowa started on Fox Business due to long running coverage of the U.S. Open)	Vince Welch	Phil Parsons	Michael Waltrip
Gateway	FS1	Vince Welch	Phil Parsons	Todd Bodine
Kentucky	FS1	Vince Welch	Phil Parsons	Michael Waltrip
Eldora	FS1	Vince Welch	Phil Parsons	Michael Waltrip
Pocono	FS1	Vince Welch	Phil Parsons	Michael Waltrip
Bristol	FS1	Vince Welch	Phil Parsons	Michael Waltrip
Michigan	FS2	Vince Welch	Phil Parsons	Michael Waltrip
Mosport	FS1	Vince Welch	Phil Parsons	Michael Waltrip
Chicagoland	FS1	Vince Welch	Phil Parsons	Michael Waltrip
New Hampshire	FS1	Vince Welch	Phil Parsons	Michael Waltrip
Las Vegas	FS1	Vince Welch	Phil Parsons	Michael Waltrip
Talladega	Fox	Vince Welch	Phil Parsons	Michael Waltrip
Martinsville	FS1	Vince Welch	Phil Parsons	Michael Waltrip
Texas	FS1	Vince Welch	Phil Parsons	Michael Waltrip
Phoenix	FS1	Vince Welch	Phil Parsons	Michael Waltrip
Homestead	FS1	Vince Welch	Phil Parsons	Michael Waltrip
2017 NASCAR Camping World Truck Series
Daytona	FS1	Vince Welch	Phil Parsons	Michael Waltrip
Atlanta	FS1	Vince Welch	Phil Parsons	Michael Waltrip
Martinsville	Fox	Vince Welch	Kevin Harvick	Michael Waltrip
Kansas	FS1	Vince Welch	Phil Parsons	Michael Waltrip
Charlotte	FS1	Vince Welch	Phil Parsons	Michael Waltrip
Dover	FS1	Vince Welch	Phil Parsons	Michael Waltrip
Texas	FS1	Vince Welch	Phil Parsons	Todd Bodine
Gateway	FS1	Vince Welch	Phil Parsons	Todd Bodine
Iowa	FS1	Vince Welch	Phil Parsons	Michael Waltrip
Kentucky	FS1	Vince Welch	Phil Parsons	Michael Waltrip
Eldora	FBN	Vince Welch	Kevin Harvick	Michael Waltrip
Pocono	Fox	Vince Welch	Phil Parsons	Michael Waltrip
Michigan	FS1	Vince Welch	Phil Parsons	Michael Waltrip
Bristol	FS1	Vince Welch	Phil Parsons	Michael Waltrip
Mosport	FS1	Vince Welch	Phil Parsons	Michael Waltrip
Chicagoland	FS1	Vince Welch	Phil Parsons	Michael Waltrip
New Hampshire	FS1	Vince Welch	Phil Parsons	Michael Waltrip
Las Vegas	FS1	Vince Welch	Phil Parsons	Michael Waltrip
Talladega	Fox	Vince Welch	Kevin Harvick	Michael Waltrip
Martinsville	FS1	Vince Welch	Phil Parsons	Michael Waltrip
Texas	FS1	Vince Welch	Phil Parsons	Michael Waltrip
Phoenix	FS1	Vince Welch	Phil Parsons	Michael Waltrip
Homestead	FS1	Vince Welch	Phil Parsons	Michael Waltrip
2018 NASCAR Camping World Truck Series
Daytona	FS1	Vince Welch	Phil Parsons	Michael Waltrip
Atlanta	FS1	Vince Welch	Phil Parsons	Michael Waltrip
Las Vegas	FS1	Vince Welch	Phil Parsons	Michael Waltrip
Martinsville	FS1	Vince Welch	Phil Parsons	Michael Waltrip
Dover	FS1	Vince Welch	Phil Parsons	Michael Waltrip
Kansas	FS1	Vince Welch	Phil Parsons	Michael Waltrip
Charlotte	FS1	Vince Welch	Phil Parsons	Michael Waltrip
Texas	FS1	Vince Welch	Phil Parsons	Todd Bodine
Iowa	FS1	Vince Welch	Phil Parsons	Michael Waltrip
Gateway	FS1	Vince Welch	Phil Parsons	Todd Bodine
Chicagoland	FS1	Vince Welch	Phil Parsons	Michael Waltrip
Kentucky	FS1	Vince Welch	Kevin Harvick	Michael Waltrip
Eldora	FS1	Vince Welch	Kyle Larson	Michael Waltrip
Pocono	FS1	Vince Welch	Phil Parsons	Michael Waltrip
Michigan	FS1	Vince Welch	Phil Parsons	Michael Waltrip
Bristol	Fox	Vince Welch	Phil Parsons	Michael Waltrip
Mosport	FS1	Vince Welch	Phil Parsons	Michael Waltrip
Las Vegas	FS1	Vince Welch	Phil Parsons	Michael Waltrip
Talladega	Fox	Vince Welch	Kevin Harvick	Michael Waltrip
Martinsville	FS1	Vince Welch	Phil Parsons	Kurt Busch
Texas	FS1	Vince Welch	Phil Parsons	Michael Waltrip
Phoenix	FS1	Vince Welch	Phil Parsons	Michael Waltrip
Homestead	FS1	Vince Welch	Phil Parsons	Michael Waltrip
2019 NASCAR Gander Outdoors Truck Series
Daytona	FS1	Vince Welch	Phil Parsons	Michael Waltrip
Atlanta	FS1	Vince Welch	Phil Parsons	Michael Waltrip
Las Vegas	FS1	Vince Welch	Phil Parsons	Michael Waltrip
Martinsville	Fox	Vince Welch	Phil Parsons	Michael Waltrip
Texas	FS1	Vince Welch	Phil Parsons	Michael Waltrip
Dover	FS1	Vince Welch	Phil Parsons	Michael Waltrip
Kansas	FS1	Vince Welch	Phil Parsons	Michael Waltrip
Charlotte	FS1	Vince Welch	Phil Parsons	Michael Waltrip
Texas	FS1	Vince Welch	Phil Parsons	Michael Waltrip
Iowa	FS1	Vince Welch	Phil Parsons	Michael Waltrip
Gateway	FS1	Vince Welch	Phil Parsons	Todd Bodine
Chicagoland	FS1	Vince Welch	Phil Parsons	Michael Waltrip
Kentucky	FS1	Vince Welch	Phil Parsons	Michael Waltrip
Pocono	Fox	Vince Welch	Phil Parsons	Michael Waltrip
Eldora	FS1	Vince Welch	Phil Parsons	Michael Waltrip
Michigan	FS1	Vince Welch	Phil Parsons	Michael Waltrip
Bristol	FS1	Vince Welch	Phil Parsons	Michael Waltrip
Mosport	FS1	Vince Welch	Phil Parsons	Michael Waltrip
Las Vegas	FS1	Vince Welch	Phil Parsons	Michael Waltrip
Talladega	FS1	Vince Welch	Phil Parsons	Michael Waltrip
Martinsville	FS1	Vince Welch	Phil Parsons	Michael Waltrip
Phoenix	FS1	Vince Welch	Phil Parsons	Michael Waltrip
Homestead	FS1	Vince Welch	Phil Parsons	Michael Waltrip
2020 NASCAR Gander RV & Outdoors Truck Series
Daytona	FS1	Vince Welch	Michael Waltrip	Joey Logano
Las Vegas	FS1	Vince Welch	Michael Waltrip	Erik Jones
Charlotte	FS1	Vince Welch	Michael Waltrip	Phil Parsons
Atlanta	FS1	Vince Welch	Michael Waltrip	Todd Bodine
Homestead	FS1	Vince Welch	Michael Waltrip	Phil Parsons
Pocono	FS1	Vince Welch	Michael Waltrip	Todd Bodine
Kentucky	FS1	Vince Welch	Michael Waltrip	Phil Parsons
Texas 1	FS1	Vince Welch	Michael Waltrip	Regan Smith
Kansas 1	FS1	Vince Welch	Michael Waltrip	Jamie McMurray
Kansas 2	FS1	Vince Welch	Michael Waltrip	Regan Smith
Michigan	FS1	Vince Welch	Michael Waltrip	Jamie McMurray
Daytona RC	FS1	Vince Welch	Michael Waltrip	Jamie McMurray
Dover	FS1	Vince Welch	Michael Waltrip	Jamie McMurray
Gateway	FS1	Vince Welch	Michael Waltrip	Regan Smith
Darlington	FS1	Vince Welch	Michael Waltrip	Regan Smith
Richmond	FS1	Vince Welch	Michael Waltrip	Kurt Busch
Bristol	FS1	Vince Welch	Michael Waltrip	Kurt Busch
Las Vegas	FS1	Vince Welch	Michael Waltrip	Kurt Busch
Talladega	FS1	Vince Welch	Michael Waltrip	Kurt Busch
Kansas	Fox	Vince Welch	Michael Waltrip	Kurt Busch
Texas 2	FS1	Vince Welch	Michael Waltrip	Kurt Busch
Martinsville	FS1	Vince Welch	Michael Waltrip	Kurt Busch
Phoenix	FS1	Vince Welch	Michael Waltrip	Kurt Busch
2021 NASCAR Camping World Truck Series
Daytona	FS1	Vince Welch	Michael Waltrip	Jamie McMurray
Daytona RC	FS1	Vince Welch	Michael Waltrip	None
Las Vegas 1	FS1	Vince Welch	Michael Waltrip	Austin Dillon
Atlanta	FS1	Vince Welch	Michael Waltrip	Ryan Blaney
Bristol Dirt	FS1	Vince Welch	Michael Waltrip	Joey Logano
Richmond	FS1	Vince Welch	Michael Waltrip	None
Kansas	FS1	Vince Welch	Michael Waltrip	Phil Parsons
Darlington 1	FS1	Vince Welch	Michael Waltrip	None
COTA	FS1	Vince Welch	Michael Waltrip	Andy Lally
Charlotte	FS1	Vince Welch	Michael Waltrip	None
Texas	FS1	Vince Welch	Joey Logano	Brad Keselowski
Nashville	FS1	Vince Welch	Phil Parsons	None
Pocono	FS1	Vince Welch	Phil Parsons	None
Knoxville	FS1	Vince Welch	Michael Waltrip	Kevin Swindell
Watkins Glen	FS1	Vince Welch	Michael Waltrip	Joey Logano
Gateway	FS1	Vince Welch	Michael Waltrip	Kurt Busch
Darlington 2	FS1	Vince Welch	Michael Waltrip	Ricky Carmichael
Bristol	FS1	Vince Welch	Michael Waltrip	Kurt Busch
Las Vegas 2	FS1	Vince Welch	Michael Waltrip	Kurt Busch
Talladega	FS1	Vince Welch	Michael Waltrip	Kurt Busch
Martinsville	FS1	Vince Welch	Michael Waltrip	Kurt Busch
Phoenix	FS1	Vince Welch	Michael Waltrip	Phil Parsons
2022 NASCAR Camping World Truck Series
Daytona	FS1	Vince Welch	Michael Waltrip	Kurt Busch
Las Vegas	FS1	Vince Welch	Michael Waltrip	Kurt Busch
Atlanta	FS1	Vince Welch	Michael Waltrip	Phil Parsons
COTA	FS1	Vince Welch	Michael Waltrip	Andy Lally
Martinsville	FS1	Vince Welch	Michael Waltrip	Phil Parsons
Bristol Dirt	FS1	Vince Welch	Michael Waltrip	Kurt Busch
Darlington	FS1	Vince Welch	Michael Waltrip	Phil Parsons
Kansas 1	FS1	Vince Welch	Michael Waltrip	Kurt Busch
Texas	FS1	Vince Welch	Michael Waltrip	Phil Parsons
Charlotte	FS1	Vince Welch	Michael Waltrip	Kurt Busch
Gateway	FS1	Vince Welch	Michael Waltrip	Kurt Busch
Sonoma	FS1	Vince Welch	Michael Waltrip	Andy Lally
Knoxville	FS1	Vince Welch	Trevor Bayne	Phil Parsons
Nashville	FS1	Vince Welch	Michael Waltrip	Phil Parsons
Mid-Ohio	FS1	Vince Welch	Andy Lally	Phil Parsons
Pocono	Fox	Vince Welch	Trevor Bayne	Phil Parsons
IRP	FS1	Vince Welch	Michael Waltrip	Phil Parsons
Richmond	FS1	Vince Welch	Michael Waltrip	Phil Parsons
Kansas 2	FS1	Vince Welch	Michael Waltrip	Phil Parsons
Bristol	FS1	Vince Welch	Michael Waltrip	Phil Parsons
Talladega	FS1	Vince Welch	Michael Waltrip	Phil Parsons
Homestead	FS1	Vince Welch	Michael Waltrip	Phil Parsons
Phoenix	FS1	Vince Welch	Michael Waltrip	Phil Parsons
2023 NASCAR Craftsman Truck Series
Daytona	FS1	Adam Alexander	Michael Waltrip	Phil Parsons
Las Vegas	FS1	Jamie Little	Michael Waltrip	Phil Parsons
Atlanta	FS1	Jamie Little	Michael Waltrip	Phil Parsons
COTA	FS1	Jamie Little	Michael Waltrip	Kevin Harvick
Texas	FS1	Jamie Little	Michael Waltrip	Phil Parsons
Bristol Dirt	FS1	Adam Alexander	Michael Waltrip	Phil Parsons
Martinsville	FS1	Jamie Little	Michael Waltrip	Phil Parsons
Kansas 1	FS1	Adam Alexander	Michael Waltrip	Kevin Harvick
Darlington	FS1	Jamie Little	Michael Waltrip	Phil Parsons
North Wilkesboro	Fox	Adam Alexander	Michael Waltrip	Phil Parsons
Charlotte	FS1	Adam Alexander	Michael Waltrip	Phil Parsons
Gateway	FS1	Jamie Little	Michael Waltrip	Phil Parsons

=== 2025–2031: Fox/FS1 ===
==== Cup Series ====
Race	Network	Lap-by-lap	Color commentator(s)	
2025 NASCAR Cup Series
Clash	Fox	Mike Joy	Clint Bowyer	Kevin Harvick
Duels	FS1	Mike Joy	Clint Bowyer	Kevin Harvick
Daytona	Fox	Mike Joy	Clint Bowyer	Kevin Harvick
Atlanta	Fox	Mike Joy	Clint Bowyer	Kevin Harvick
COTA	Fox	Mike Joy	Clint Bowyer	Kevin Harvick
Phoenix	FS1	Mike Joy	Clint Bowyer	Kevin Harvick
Las Vegas	FS1	Mike Joy	Clint Bowyer	Kevin Harvick
Homestead	FS1	Mike Joy	Clint Bowyer	Kevin Harvick
Martinsville	FS1	Mike Joy	Clint Bowyer	Kevin Harvick
Darlington	FS1	Mike Joy	Clint Bowyer	Kevin Harvick
Bristol	FS1	Mike Joy	Clint Bowyer	Kevin Harvick
Talladega	Fox	Mike Joy	Clint Bowyer	Kevin Harvick
Texas	FS1	Mike Joy	Clint Bowyer	Kevin Harvick
Kansas	FS1	Mike Joy	Clint Bowyer	Kevin Harvick

==== Truck Series ====
Race	Network	Lap-by-lap	Color commentator(s)	
2025 NASCAR Craftsman Truck Series
Daytona	FS1	Jamie Little	Joey Logano	Kevin Harvick
Atlanta	FS1	Jamie Little	Joey Logano	Brad Keselowski
Las Vegas	FS1	Jamie Little	Joey Logano	Brad Keselowski
Homestead	Fox	Kevin Harvick	Joey Logano	Brad Keselowski
Martinsville	FS1	Jamie Little	Joey Logano	Michael Waltrip
Bristol	FS1	Jamie Little	Joey Logano	Michael Waltrip
Rockingham	FS1	Jamie Little	Carson Hocevar	Michael Waltrip
Texas	FS1	Jamie Little	Joey Logano	Michael Waltrip
Kansas	FS1	Jamie Little	Brad Keselowski	Michael Waltrip
North Wilksboro	FS1	Jamie Little	Ryan Blaney	Michael Waltrip
Charlotte	FS1	Kevin Harvick	Joey Logano	Michael Waltrip
Nashville	FS1	Jamie Little	Regan Smith	Michael Waltrip
Michigan	FS1	Jamie Little	Regan Smith	Michael Waltrip
Pocono	FS1	Jamie Little	Kevin Harvick	Michael Waltrip
Lime Rock Park	FS1	Jamie Little	Trevor Bayne	Michael Waltrip
IRP	FS1	Jamie Little	Regan Smith	Michael Waltrip
Watkins Glen	FS1	Jamie Little	Regan Smith	Michael Waltrip
Richmond	FS1	Jamie Little	Regan Smith	Michael Waltrip
Darlington	FS1	Jamie Little	Kevin Harvick	Todd Bodine

Notes

Preceded by CBS	Daytona 500 television broadcaster 2001–present (until at least 2031) (shared with NBC from 2001–2006; Fox aired race in 2001, 2003, and 2005)	Succeeded by Incumbent
Preceded by CBS	NASCAR pay television carrier in the United States; 2001–present (shared with NBC from 2001–2006, 2015–present; TNT from 2001–2014, 2025–present; and ESPN from 2007–2014; and Prime Video since 2025)	Succeeded by Incumbent
