= 2012 Budweiser Shootout =

Stock car race

Race details
- Race 1 of 2 exhibition races in the 2012 NASCAR Sprint Cup Series
- Date: February 18, 2012
- Location: Daytona International Speedway, Daytona Beach, Florida, US
- Course: Permanent racing facility
- Course length: 2.5 miles (4 km)
- Distance: 82 laps, 205 mi (329.915 km)
- Weather: Temperatures up to 78.1 °F (25.6 °C); wind speeds up to 7 miles per hour (11 km/h)
- Average speed: 124.096 miles per hour (199.713 km/h)

Pole position
Driver	Martin Truex Jr.	Michael Waltrip Racing
- Time: N/A

Most laps led
Driver	Greg Biffle	Roush Fenway Racing
- Laps: 17

Winner
No. 18	Kyle Busch	Joe Gibbs Racing

Television in the United States
- Network: Fox
- Announcers: Mike Joy, Larry McReynolds, Darrell Waltrip
- Nielsen ratings: 4.2/8 (Final); 3.9/7 (Overnight); (7.467 million)

The 2012 Budweiser Shootout was the first exhibition stock car race of the 2012 NASCAR Sprint Cup Series. The 34th annual running of the Budweiser Shootout, it was held on February 18, 2012 at the Daytona International Speedway in Daytona Beach, Florida, United States, before a crowd of 82,000 people. Kyle Busch of the Joe Gibbs Racing team won the 82-lap race. It was Busch's first victory in the event; Stewart–Haas Racing driver Tony Stewart finished second with Richard Petty Motorsports racer Marcos Ambrose third.

Pole position driver Martin Truex Jr. was immediately passed by Jeff Gordon before the first turn, and Dale Earnhardt Jr. led at the end of the first lap. On the ninth lap, a multiple-car accident prompted the first caution flag. Sixteen laps later the second caution was issued, with Jamie McMurray leading. During the caution period, all teams made pit stops. On lap 62 Gordon reclaimed the lead, holding it until he was involved in an accident (the race's final caution). Stewart led at the final restart, holding it until the final lap when Busch passed him to win. Five cautions were issued during the race, which saw twenty-six lead changes by thirteen different drivers and attracted 7.46 million television viewers.

== Background ==
Daytona International Speedway, where the race was held

The 2012 Budweiser Shootout was the first of two exhibition stock car races of the 2012 NASCAR Sprint Cup Series, and the 34th annual edition of the event. It took place on February 18, 2012, in Daytona Beach, Florida, at Daytona International Speedway, a superspeedway that holds NASCAR races. Its standard track is a four-turn, 2.5-mile (4.0 km) superspeedway. Daytona's turns are banked at 31 degrees, and the front stretch (the location of the finish line) is banked at 18 degrees.

The Budweiser Shootout was created by Busch Beer brand manager Monty Roberts as the Busch Clash in 1979. The race, designed to promote Busch Beer, invites the fastest NASCAR drivers from the previous season to compete. The race is considered a "warm-up" for the Daytona 500. It was renamed the Bud Shootout in 1998. The name changed to the Budweiser Shootout in 2001, the Sprint Unlimited in 2013 and the Advance Auto Parts Clash in 2017.

Thirty-three drivers were eligible to compete in the race, including the top 25 in the 2011 championship standings and previous winners at Daytona (including the Daytona 500 and the Coke Zero 400). Kurt Busch was the defending champion. The race was scheduled to be 75 laps long, with two segments of 25 and 50 laps separated by a ten-minute pit stop. During the pit stop, teams could change tires, add fuel, and make normal chassis adjustments but could not change springs, shock absorbers or rear ends. Work could be done in the garage or on the pit road. Caution and green-flag laps were counted in the race.

After the two-car style draft (also called tandem racing) dominated races held on restrictor plate tracks during 2011, NASCAR reduced the size of the radiators from five liters to two liters and the air intakes were moved towards the car's fascia section. The size of the restrictor plate was reduced by 1/64 inch (0.4 mm) and the cars were required to run with softer springs and a smaller rear spoiler. These changes were intended to reduce the effectiveness of two-car style drafting and to make the cars more challenging to turn. Sprint Cup Series director John Darby stated NASCAR wanted to be able to allow teams more options with drafting and hoped the difference in speeds between tandem drafting and pack style racing would be reduced.

== Practice and Qualification ==
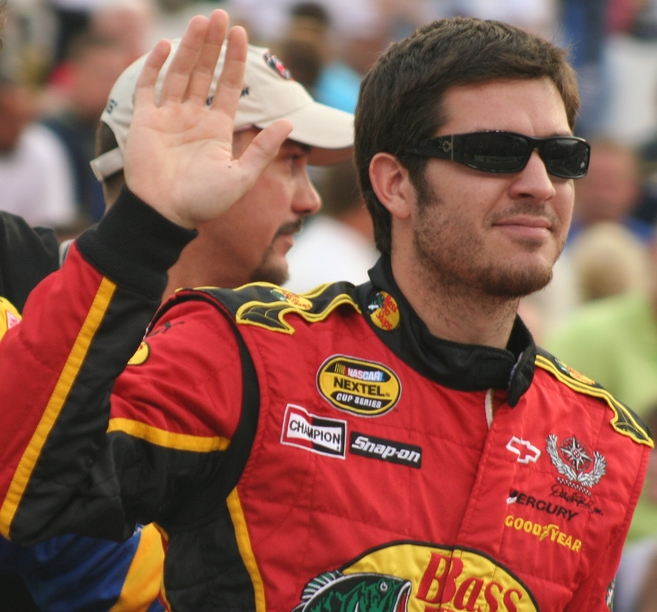
Martin Truex Jr. (pictured in 2007) picked the pole position for Michael Waltrip Racing.

Two practice sessions were held on Friday afternoon. The first session lasted 45 minutes; the second, scheduled for 60 minutes, was shortened to ten because of rain. Matt Kenseth had the fastest time (44.607 seconds, five-thousandths of a second faster than Jeff Burton) in the first session (where drivers tried out pack and tandem drafting). David Ragan was third, ahead of Jamie McMurray, Ryan Newman, and Denny Hamlin. Brad Keselowski was seventh, within one second of Kenseth's time. Tony Stewart and Kurt Busch collided near the end of the session, beginning a chain-reaction accident involving cars driven by A. J. Allmendinger, Keselowski and Kyle Busch; Keselowski, Allmendinger, and Kyle and Kurt Busch were required to use their backup cars. Stewart was taken to the track's infield care center where he was treated for minor injuries and later released. McMurray was fastest in the second practice session, (where twelve drivers took part) with a lap of 45.524 seconds. Juan Pablo Montoya was second, ahead of Greg Biffle and Kasey Kahne. Marcos Ambrose was fifth-fastest, and Hamlin, Michael Waltrip, Joey Logano, Kenseth, and Carl Edwards rounded out the top ten positions.

The 25 drivers determined their starting positions by lot, a feature that is unique to the event. Martin Truex Jr. drew the pole position, with Kyle Busch, Keselowski, McMurray and Ragan rounding out the first five positions. Kurt Busch drew sixth place and Biffle drew seventh, ahead of Dale Earnhardt Jr. and Allmendinger in eighth and ninth. Logano, Edwards, Burton, Newman, and Jeff Gordon drew the next five positions. Stewart, who drew fifteenth, was followed by Hamlin, Clint Bowyer, Jimmie Johnson, Kahne, and Waltrip for the first 20 spots. Ambrose, Kevin Harvick, Kenseth, Paul Menard, and Montoya drew the last five positions in the race. Once the lot was completed, Truex commented, "I haven't been in this race in a few years. I absolutely hated being down here (those years) and watching this race, so it's cool just to be in it and to get the pole is icing on the cake."

=== Qualifying results ===
Pos	No.	Driver	Team	Manufacturer
1	56	Martin Truex Jr.	Michael Waltrip Racing	Toyota
2	18	Kyle Busch	Joe Gibbs Racing	Toyota
3	2	Brad Keselowski	Penske Racing	Dodge
4	1	Jamie McMurray	Earnhardt Ganassi Racing	Chevrolet
5	34	David Ragan	Front Row Motorsports	Ford
6	51	Kurt Busch	Phoenix Racing	Chevrolet
7	16	Greg Biffle	Roush Fenway Racing	Ford
8	88	Dale Earnhardt Jr.	Hendrick Motorsports	Chevrolet
9	22	A. J. Allmendinger	Penske Racing	Dodge
10	20	Joey Logano	Joe Gibbs Racing	Toyota
11	99	Carl Edwards	Roush Fenway Racing	Ford
12	31	Jeff Burton	Richard Childress Racing	Chevrolet
13	39	Ryan Newman	Stewart–Haas Racing	Chevrolet
14	24	Jeff Gordon	Hendrick Motorsports	Chevrolet
15	14	Tony Stewart	Stewart–Haas Racing	Chevrolet
16	11	Denny Hamlin	Joe Gibbs Racing	Toyota
17	15	Clint Bowyer	Michael Waltrip Racing	Toyota
18	48	Jimmie Johnson	Hendrick Motorsports	Chevrolet
19	5	Kasey Kahne	Hendrick Motorsports	Chevrolet
20	55	Michael Waltrip	Michael Waltrip Racing	Toyota
21	9	Marcos Ambrose	Richard Petty Motorsports	Ford
22	29	Kevin Harvick	Richard Childress Racing	Chevrolet
23	17	Matt Kenseth	Roush Fenway Racing	Ford
24	27	Paul Menard	Richard Childress Racing	Chevrolet
25	42	Juan Pablo Montoya	Earnhardt Ganassi Racing	Chevrolet

== Race ==
The race began at 8:10 pm Eastern Standard Time, and was broadcast live on television in the United States by Fox, and by TSN2 in Canada. Commentary was provided by Mike Joy, with analysis given by retired driver Darrell Waltrip and former crew chief Larry McReynolds. Tim McNeil of First Methodist Church began the pre-race ceremonies with an invocation. Country music group Little Big Town performed the national anthem, and Petty 1st Class Officer William Kimberl, Petty 1st Class Officer Andres Reyes and Petty Officer 2nd Class Aaron Schwartz from the United States Armed Forces commanded the drivers to start their engines. During the pace laps, Keselowski, Allmendinger, and Kyle and Kurt Busch had to move to the rear of the grid because they had switched to their backup cars.

McMurray accelerated faster than Truex off the line (leading him at the first turn), but by the end of the first lap Earnhardt had the lead. Three laps later, McMurray reclaimed the lead; one lap later, Logano passed him. On lap six, Truex briefly reclaimed the lead before Harvick passed him. Three laps later a multiple-car collision between turns one and two, involving Waltrip, Menard, Kahne, Burton, Ragan, Kenseth, and Montoya, triggered the first caution of the race and the pace car. The race restarted on lap sixteen, with Earnhardt leading Harvick and Truex. Harvick took the lead on the same lap with assistance from McMurray. On the seventeenth lap, McMurray passed Harvick on the backstraightaway to move into the lead. One lap later, Truex took the lead before he was briefly passed by Kurt Busch but Truex retook the first position before the end of the lap. On the 21st lap, McMurray moved back into second place; two laps later McMurray passed Truex to reclaim the lead, with Edwards moving into second.

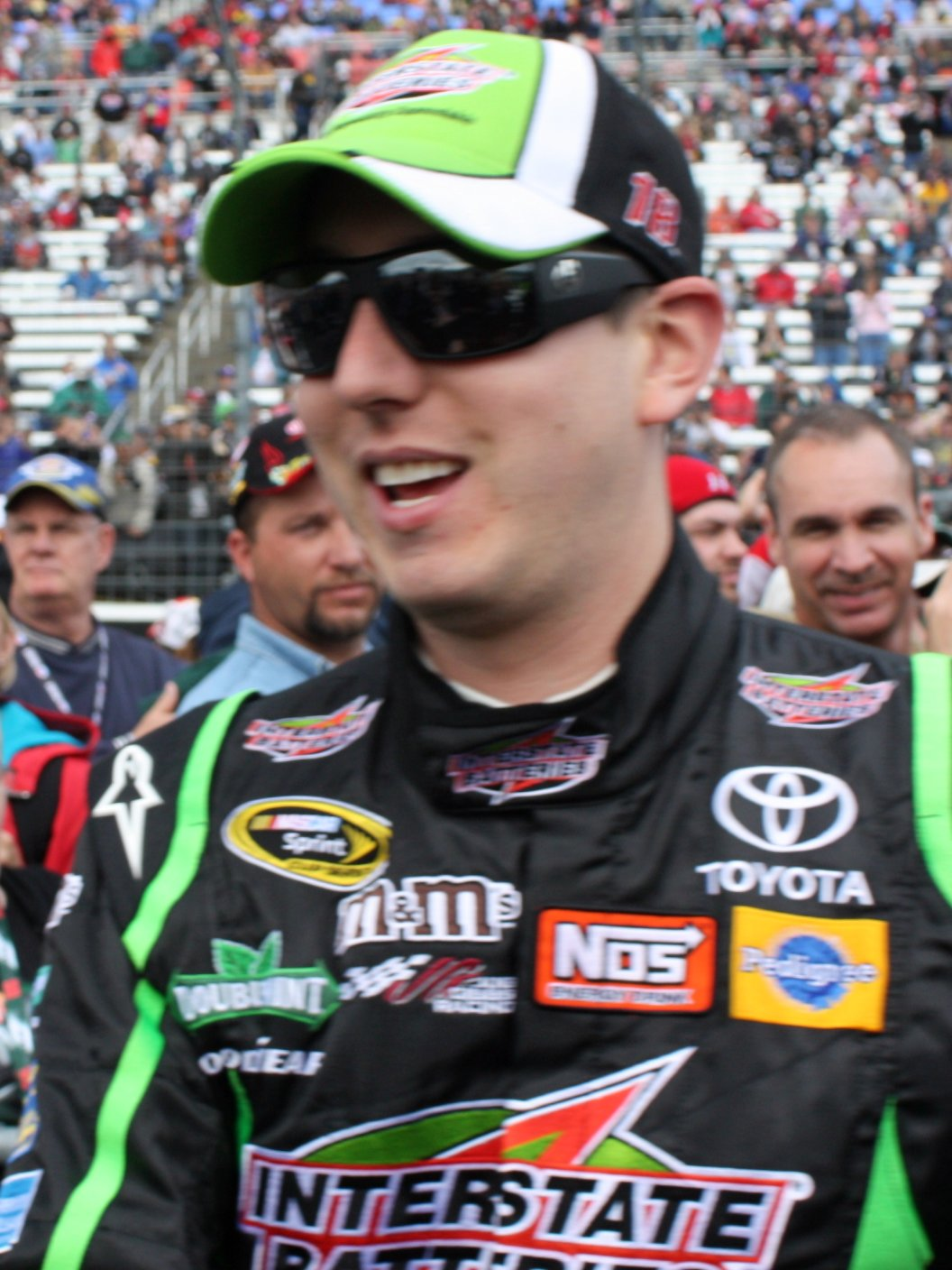
Kyle Busch (pictured in 2010) won the race after passing Tony Stewart on the final lap.

On lap 25, Gordon passed Edwards between the third and fourth turns to move into second place and a second caution was issued shortly afterward. After the caution, all the teams made a ten-minute pit stop before the restart. McMurray led Gordon, Edwards, Johnson, and Biffle in the first lap of the rolling start before Gordon took the lead; one lap later, Edwards passed Kyle Busch to move into second place. On lap 28, Biffle, assisted by teammate Edwards, passed Gordon to take the lead. Bowyer experienced oversteer on lap 29, but regained control of his car. Three laps later, Bowyer spun sideways into the infield grass in the first turn after he was hit by teammate Truex leaving the tri-oval; a third caution was issued, during which most of the leaders, including Biffle, made pit stops for fuel and tires. Biffle led the field back up to speed at the restart on 37. Montoya received drafting aid from McMurray to move to the lead on the same lap. McMurray reclaimed the lead on lap 38; Earnhardt tried to pass underneath McMurray going into the third turn two laps later, but McMurray kept the position. Truex passed McMurray on lap 44, with help from Earnhardt. By the 47th lap, Harvick had moved into the lead position; Kyle Busch collided with the wall, escaping with minor damage to the front of his car. He passed McMurray to briefly reclaim the lead one lap later, with Gordon taking over first place by the start of lap 50. Two laps later McMurray, aided by teammate Harvick, regained the lead.

The fourth caution was issued on lap 55 when Ambrose made contact with the left-rear of Logano's car, causing a multiple-car collision involving Earnhardt, Harvick, Kenseth, and Truex. Most of the leaders made pit stops during the caution. During lap 55 Harvick and Logano drove to their garages, retiring from the race. Biffle led at the lap 62 restart, before Gordon reclaimed the lead, with Johnson moving into second place. Ten laps later, Kyle Busch took the lead until Stewart passed him two laps later. On lap 74, Kyle Busch lost control of his car in turn four from left-rear contact with Gordon, who hit the wall; his car rolled over onto its roof after sliding 800 m (2,600 ft) on its left-hand side, prompting the fifth and final caution. Kurt Busch, Johnson, Allmendinger, Edwards and McMurray were caught up in the wreck. Kyle Busch sustained damage to the front splitter. The race restarted on lap 81, for a green–white–checker finish (extending the race to 82 laps) with Stewart leading Ambrose, Bowyer and Keselowski until Ambrose (with assistance from Keselowski) passed him. On the final lap, Stewart reclaimed the lead (with help from Kyle Busch) before Busch passed him on the outside in the last 100 yd (91 m) in the tri-oval to win the race. The margin of victory was 0.013 seconds, the closest in the history of the event. Ambrose finished third, Keselowski fourth and Hamlin fifth. Biffle, Newman, Bowyer, Edwards and Montoya rounded out the top ten finishers in the race. A total of 13 out of the 25 starters completed the event.

=== Post-race comments ===
Kyle Busch appeared in Victory Lane to celebrate his first victory in the Budweiser Shootout at his sixth attempt; the win earned him $198,550. He said, "I don't know how many times I spun out and didn't spin out. Amazing race. It was fun to drive when I wasn't getting turned around", and, "Stab and steer, stab and steer, That's what you do. And some brakes. There are brakes involved, too. I thought I was clear ... and I tried going down slowly, and Jimmie just must have been there a little bit, turned me sideways and got me on the apron—scared everybody half to death, including me." Stewart, who finished second, said, "I actually had fun racing at Daytona again, which I haven't had for a while. I don't know what the consensus is from everybody else, but I had more fun as a driver tonight than what we've had in the past." Ambrose, who finished third in the race, explained, "It's definitely a lot more fun, more entertaining for the fans, and more in control for the drivers."

According to Ragan, who was involved in the race's largest accident, "Everybody was real racy and I just got into the back of Menard. You get a good run, and you're pushing a little bit, and I guess he was pushing whoever was in front of him. And when you've got the meat in between the sandwich, you usually get wrecked." Harvick blamed the accident on drivers who had little experience of pack racing: "The biggest problem is the tandem racing has been so easy for these guys to stay attached that some of them haven't raced in pack racing. It's going to take a lot more patience from a lot of guys who haven't done this before." Nevertheless, Menard thought that the pack style of racing would be a good combination for the Daytona 500 and believed it would be "chaotic" and "exciting". Four days after the race, NASCAR announced that the pressure relief values in the engine would be increased from 25 psi (1.7 bar) to 28 psi (1.9 bar) after some drivers complained of overheating issues while they were running in packs. The race had a television audience of 7.46 million viewers.

=== Race results ===
Pos	No.	Driver	Team	Manufacturer	Laps
1	18	Kyle Busch	Joe Gibbs Racing	Toyota	82
2	14	Tony Stewart	Stewart–Haas Racing	Chevrolet	82
3	9	Marcos Ambrose	Richard Petty Motorsports	Ford	82
4	2	Brad Keselowski	Penske Racing	Dodge	82
5	11	Denny Hamlin	Joe Gibbs Racing	Toyota	82
6	16	Greg Biffle	Roush Fenway Racing	Ford	82
7	39	Ryan Newman	Stewart–Haas Racing	Chevrolet	82
8	15	Clint Bowyer	Michael Waltrip Racing	Toyota	82
9	99	Carl Edwards	Roush Fenway Racing	Ford	82
10	42	Juan Pablo Montoya	Earnhardt Ganassi Racing	Chevrolet	82
11	31	Jeff Burton	Richard Childress Racing	Chevrolet	81
12	22	A. J. Allmendinger	Penske Racing	Dodge	80
13	5	Kasey Kahne	Hendrick Motorsports	Chevrolet	79
14	48	Jimmie Johnson	Hendrick Motorsports	Chevrolet	74
15	24	Jeff Gordon	Hendrick Motorsports	Chevrolet	73
16	1	Jamie McMurray	Earnhardt Ganassi Racing	Chevrolet	73
17	51	Kurt Busch	Phoenix Racing	Chevrolet	73
18	20	Joey Logano	Joe Gibbs Racing	Toyota	54
19	56	Martin Truex Jr.	Michael Waltrip Racing	Toyota	54
20	88	Dale Earnhardt Jr.	Hendrick Motorsports	Chevrolet	54
21	17	Matt Kenseth	Roush Fenway Racing	Ford	54
22	29	Kevin Harvick	Richard Childress Racing	Chevrolet	54
23	27	Paul Menard	Richard Childress Racing	Chevrolet	8
24	34	David Ragan	Front Row Motorsports	Ford	8
25	55	Michael Waltrip	Michael Waltrip Racing	Toyota	8
