= 2001 The Winston =

17th iteration of the NASCAR All-Star Race

- Race details
Date	May 19, 2001
Location	Lowe's Motor Speedway in Concord, North Carolina
Course	Permanent racing facility 1.5 mi (2.4 km)
Distance	Winston Open: 30 laps, 45 mi (72 km); No Bull Sprint: 16 laps, 24 mi (39 km); The Winston: 70 laps, 105 mi (169 km)
Avg Speed	All-Star Race: 185.022 mph (297.764 km/h)
- Winston Open
Pole position	Johnny Benson Jr. (MBV Motorsports)
Winner	Johnny Benson Jr. (MBV Motorsports)
- No Bull 5 Sprint
Pole position	Mike Wallace (Ultra Motorsports)
Winner	Todd Bodine (Travis Carter Motorsports)
- Winston All Star Race
Pole position	Rusty Wallace (Penske Racing); 119.112 seconds
Winston Open Transfers	Johnny Benson Jr. (Open winner); Todd Bodine (No Bull Sprint winner)
Most laps led	Ward Burton (Bill Davis Racing)/Johnny Benson Jr. (MBV Motorsports); 20 laps
Winner	Jeff Gordon (Hendrick Motorsports)
- Television
Network	FX
Announcers	Mike Joy, Darrell Waltrip and Larry McReynolds

The 2001 edition of The Winston was held on May 19, 2001, at Lowe's Motor Speedway in Concord, North Carolina. This was the 17th running of the event. The race is mostly remembered for the start, when rain progressed onto the track, causing cars to get loose and crash into the wall. One of the first ones to crash was Kevin Harvick, in his first appearance at the speedway. Then Jeff Gordon got sideways and wrecked after tapping Jeff Burton from behind, then Michael Waltrip wrecked Gordon, destroying his car, at which point the race was stopped. All of the drivers returned with back-up cars. At the end, Gordon came across the line and won his third All-Star race, tying Dale Earnhardt. Drivers Johnny Benson and Todd Bodine advanced from The Winston Open, with Benson winning the Open and Bodine winning the No Bull 5 Sprint race. This was the first Winston event without Darrell Waltrip and Dale Earnhardt. Waltrip retired at the end of 2000 and called the 2001 race from the booth, and Earnhardt was killed earlier in the season at the Daytona 500. Both drivers competed in the first 16 events.

== 2001 The Winston drivers and eligibility ==
- 1-Steve Park (2 wins from 2000 and 2001)
- 2-Rusty Wallace (5 wins from 2000 and 2001)
- 5-Terry Labonte (2 NASCAR Winston Cup Series titles in 1984 and 1996)
- 6-Mark Martin (1 win in 2000)
- 8-Dale Earnhardt Jr. (2 wins in 2000)
- 9-Bill Elliott (1988 NASCAR Winston Cup Series champion)
- 12-Jeremy Mayfield (2 wins in 2000)
- 15-Michael Waltrip (2001 Daytona 500 winner)
- 17-Matt Kenseth (1 win in 2000)
- 18-Bobby Labonte (2000 NASCAR Winston Cup Series champion)
- 20-Tony Stewart (7 wins from 2000 and 2001)
- 21-Elliott Sadler (Food City 500 winner)
- 22-Ward Burton (1 win in 2000)
- 24-Jeff Gordon (4 wins from 2000 and 2001)
- 25-Jerry Nadeau (1 win in 2000)
- 29-Kevin Harvick (Cracker Barrel Old Country Store 500 winner)
- 55-Bobby Hamilton (Talladega 500 winner)
- 88-Dale Jarrett (5 wins from 2000 and 2001)
- 99-Jeff Burton (4 wins in 2000)

== The Winston Open/No Bull 5 Sprint ==
Johnny Benson started on the pole and led the first 7 laps of the 30 lap Winston Open. After a caution for a single car accident by Stacy Compton on lap 3, part-time driver and second-place starter Ryan Newman passed Benson for the lead. Newman led most of the race until his engine blew with 2 laps to go, causing a caution. Johnny Benson would take the lead under caution, win the race, and advance to The Winston.

In the 16 lap No Bull 5 Sprint Race, Buckshot Jones got loose in turn one and touched Jason Leffler, who also spun. After crashing hard into the wall, Jones came down across the track into the path of 60-year-old driver Dave Marcis. Jones was seen wearing a HANS Device upon exiting his car. Marcis was making his final attempt at The Winston and all 3 drivers failed to finish the race. After the race restarted, Todd Bodine took the lead, held on to win and advance to the Winston.

=== The Winston Open top five results ===
1. 10-Johnny Benson (advances to feature)
2. 28-Ricky Rudd
3. 32-Ricky Craven
4. 7-Mike Wallace
5. 77-Robert Pressley

=== No Bull 5 Sprint top five results ===
1. 66-Todd Bodine (advances to feature)
2. 26-Jimmy Spencer
3. 77-Robert Pressley
4. 33-Bobby Hamilton Jr.
5. 36-Ken Schrader

== First lap mayhem ==
At the start of the race, pole sitter Rusty Wallace led off the green flag when rain was starting to fall at the track. Then Kevin Harvick, the third car in line, got loose and hit the wall in turn one. Jeff Gordon then hit Jeff Burton from behind, and both hit the wall. Gordon was spinning and was hit by Michael Waltrip as rain was coming down even more, Gordon's car was lying at the grass. The red flag came out once the rain was coming down hard. The drivers involved in the crash restarted the race with back-up cars. Harvick would be the only driver to not finish the race, only completing 19 laps.

== Comeback and victory ==
After the wreck, Jeff Gordon came back from the mayhem to win his third career All-Star race victory, tying Dale Earnhardt. Gordon led for 10 laps during the race and earned $515,000 for the win.

== Race results ==
1. 24-Jeff Gordon
2. 88-Dale Jarrett
3. 20-Tony Stewart
4. 18-Bobby Labonte
5. 25-Jerry Nadeau
6. 22-Ward Burton
7. 8-Dale Earnhardt Jr.
8. 66-Todd Bodine (Segment 2 winner)
9. 10-Johnny Benson (Open Segment 1 winner)
10. 55-Bobby Hamilton
11. 5-Terry Labonte
12. 12-Jeremy Mayfield
13. 6-Mark Martin
14. 17-Matt Kenseth
15. 2-Rusty Wallace
16. 99-Jeff Burton
17. 9-Bill Elliott
18. 21-Elliott Sadler
19. 1-Steve Park
20. 15-Michael Waltrip
21. 29-Kevin Harvick
