= 2013 Sprint Unlimited =

2013 Sprint Unlimited at Daytona
Race details
- Race 1 of 2 exhibition races in the 2013 NASCAR Sprint Cup Series
- Date: February 16, 2013
- Location: Daytona International Speedway, Daytona Beach, Florida, United States
- Course: Permanent racing facility
- Course length: 2.5 miles (4 km)
- Distance: 75 laps, 187.5 mi (301.8 km)
- Weather: Temperatures averaging around 57.2 °F (14.0 °C); wind speeds approaching 22 miles per hour (35 km/h)
- Average speed: 177.538 mph (285.720 km/h)

Pole position
Driver	Carl Edwards	Roush Fenway Racing

Most laps led
Driver	Kevin Harvick	Richard Childress Racing
- Laps: 40

Winner
No. 29	Kevin Harvick	Richard Childress Racing

Television in the United States
- Network: Fox Broadcasting Network
- Announcers: Mike Joy, Darrell Waltrip, and Larry McReynolds

The 2013 Sprint Unlimited at Daytona was a non-championship NASCAR Sprint Cup Series stock car race that was held on February 16, 2013, at Daytona International Speedway in Daytona Beach, Florida. Contested over 75 laps, it was the first exhibition race of the 2013 Sprint Cup Series season. Kevin Harvick of Richard Childress Racing won the race, while Greg Biffle finished second. Joey Logano, Tony Stewart, and Matt Kenseth rounded out the top five.

== Report ==
=== Background ===
Daytona International Speedway, the race track where the race was held.

Daytona International Speedway is one of six superspeedways to hold NASCAR races, the others being Michigan International Speedway, Auto Club Speedway, Indianapolis Motor Speedway, Pocono Raceway and Talladega Superspeedway. The standard track at Daytona International Speedway is a four-turn superspeedway that is 2.5 miles (4.0 km) long. The track's turns are banked at 31 degrees, while the front stretch, the location of the finish line, is banked at 18 degrees.

A total of twenty-two drivers were eligible to compete in the race, including 2012 pole position winners and previous winners of the race who had qualified for at least one race during the 2012 season, but only nineteen drivers participated in the race. Notable drivers not invited to the race were Brad Keselowski and Clint Bowyer, the 2012 champion and champion runner up, who didn't collect any pole positions in 2012. In yellow are previous Daytona Shootout winners without pole wins in the 2012 season.

Unlike other races, the race format was chosen by a fan poll, and was 75 laps long, with three segments of 30, 25, and 20 laps. Which was chosen over a format that would have seen a 35, 30, and a 10 lap segments and a 40, 20, and 15 lap segments. Fans also voted to mandate drivers to perform a 4-tire pitstop after the first segment over a 2-tire stop or no mandatory pitstop. Fans also voted for no cars to be eliminated following the second segment over 2, 4, and 6 cars being eliminated (though 7 cars were out due to crashes or mechanical issues before that point.) Fans also voted for the firesuit miss Sprint Cup appeared in victory lane in.

=== Practice and qualifying ===
Two practice sessions were held before the race, which was on February 15, 2013. The first session lasted 45 minutes, while the second lasted 60 minutes. Kevin Harvick was quickest with a time of 45.601 seconds in the first session, less than two-hundredths of a second faster than Aric Almirola. Greg Biffle with a quickest time of 45.660 seconds was third, ahead of Kasey Kahne, Martin Truex Jr., and Dale Earnhardt Jr. Juan Pablo Montoya was seventh, still within a second of Harvick's time. Also in the first session, five cars were involved in an accident after Matt Kenseth and Kurt Busch collided. In the second and final practice session, Denny Hamlin was quickest with a fastest time of 45.906 seconds. Joey Logano followed in second, ahead of Biffle and Harvick. Almirola was fifth quickest, with a time of 46.027. Montoya, Kahne, Marcos Ambrose, Kyle Busch, and Terry Labonte rounded out to the first ten positions.

== Results ==
=== Qualifying ===
Grid	No.	Driver	Team	Manufacturer
1	99	Carl Edwards	Roush Fenway Racing	Ford
2	55	Mark Martin	Michael Waltrip Racing	Toyota
3	5	Kasey Kahne	Hendrick Motorsports	Chevrolet
4	16	Greg Biffle	Roush Fenway Racing	Ford
5	11	Denny Hamlin	Joe Gibbs Racing	Toyota
6	56	Martin Truex Jr.	Michael Waltrip Racing	Toyota
7	24	Jeff Gordon	Hendrick Motorsports	Chevrolet
8	43	Aric Almirola	Richard Petty Motorsports	Ford
9	22	Joey Logano	Penske Racing	Ford
10	9	Marcos Ambrose	Richard Petty Motorsports	Ford
11	48	Jimmie Johnson	Hendrick Motorsports	Chevrolet
12	20	Matt Kenseth	Joe Gibbs Racing	Toyota
13	18	Kyle Busch	Joe Gibbs Racing	Toyota
14	42	Juan Pablo Montoya	Earnhardt Ganassi Racing	Chevrolet
15	14	Tony Stewart	Stewart–Haas Racing	Chevrolet
16	88	Dale Earnhardt Jr.	Hendrick Motorsports	Chevrolet
17	29	Kevin Harvick	Richard Childress Racing	Chevrolet
18	78	Kurt Busch	Furniture Row Racing	Chevrolet
19	32	Terry Labonte	FAS Lane Racing	Ford

=== Race results ===
Pos	No.	Driver	Team	Manufacturer	Laps
1	29	Kevin Harvick	Richard Childress Racing	Chevrolet	75
2	16	Greg Biffle	Roush Fenway Racing	Ford	75
3	22	Joey Logano	Penske Racing	Ford	75
4	14	Tony Stewart	Stewart–Haas Racing	Chevrolet	75
5	20	Matt Kenseth	Joe Gibbs Racing	Toyota	75
6	43	Aric Almirola	Richard Petty Motorsports	Ford	75
7	5	Kasey Kahne	Hendrick Motorsports	Chevrolet	75
8	88	Dale Earnhardt Jr.	Hendrick Motorsports	Chevrolet	75
9	56	Martin Truex Jr.	Michael Waltrip Racing	Toyota	75
10	42	Juan Pablo Montoya	Earnhardt Ganassi Racing	Chevrolet	75
11	9	Marcos Ambrose	Richard Petty Motorsports	Ford	75
12	99	Carl Edwards	Roush Fenway Racing	Ford	75
13	78	Kurt Busch	Furniture Row Racing	Chevrolet	14
14	48	Jimmie Johnson	Hendrick Motorsports	Chevrolet	14
15	11	Denny Hamlin	Joe Gibbs Racing	Toyota	14
16	18	Kyle Busch	Joe Gibbs Racing	Toyota	14
17	24	Jeff Gordon	Hendrick Motorsports	Chevrolet	14
18	55	Mark Martin	Michael Waltrip Racing	Toyota	14
19	32	Terry Labonte	FAS Lane Racing	Ford	2
