= 2024 Goodyear 400 =

NASCAR Cup Series race

Race details
- Race 13 of 36 in the 2024 NASCAR Cup Series
- Date: May 12, 2024
- Location: Darlington Raceway in Darlington, South Carolina
- Course: Permanent racing facility
- Course length: 1.366 miles (2.198 km)
- Distance: 293 laps, 400.238 mi (644.121 km)
- Average speed: 124.75 miles per hour (200.77 km/h)

Pole position
Driver	Tyler Reddick	23XI Racing
- Time: 28.906

Most laps led
Driver	Tyler Reddick	23XI Racing
- Laps: 174

Winner
No. 6	Brad Keselowski	RFK Racing

Television in the United States
- Network: FS1
- Announcers: Mike Joy, Clint Bowyer, and Kevin Harvick

Radio in the United States
- Radio: MRN
- Booth announcers: Alex Hayden, Jeff Striegle, and Todd Gordon
- Turn announcers: Dave Moody (1 & 2) and Mike Bagley (3 & 4)

The 2024 Goodyear 400 was a NASCAR Cup Series race held on May 12, 2024, at Darlington Raceway in Darlington, South Carolina. Contested over 293 laps on the 1.366-mile (2.198 km) egg-shaped oval, it was the 13th race of the 2024 NASCAR Cup Series season and the 68th running of the event. Brad Keselowski, driving for his co-owned RFK Racing team, won the race, marking his first win since the 2021 GEICO 500 110 races previously, and in the process becoming the first owner-driver to win a Cup race since Tony Stewart at the 2016 Toyota/Save Mart 350, and it was Ford's first win with the seventh-generation Mustang. Ty Gibbs finished second, and rookie Josh Berry came home in third. Denny Hamlin and Chase Briscoe rounded out the top five, and William Byron, Bubba Wallace, Alex Bowman, Justin Haley, and Michael McDowell rounded out the top ten.

== Report ==
=== Background ===
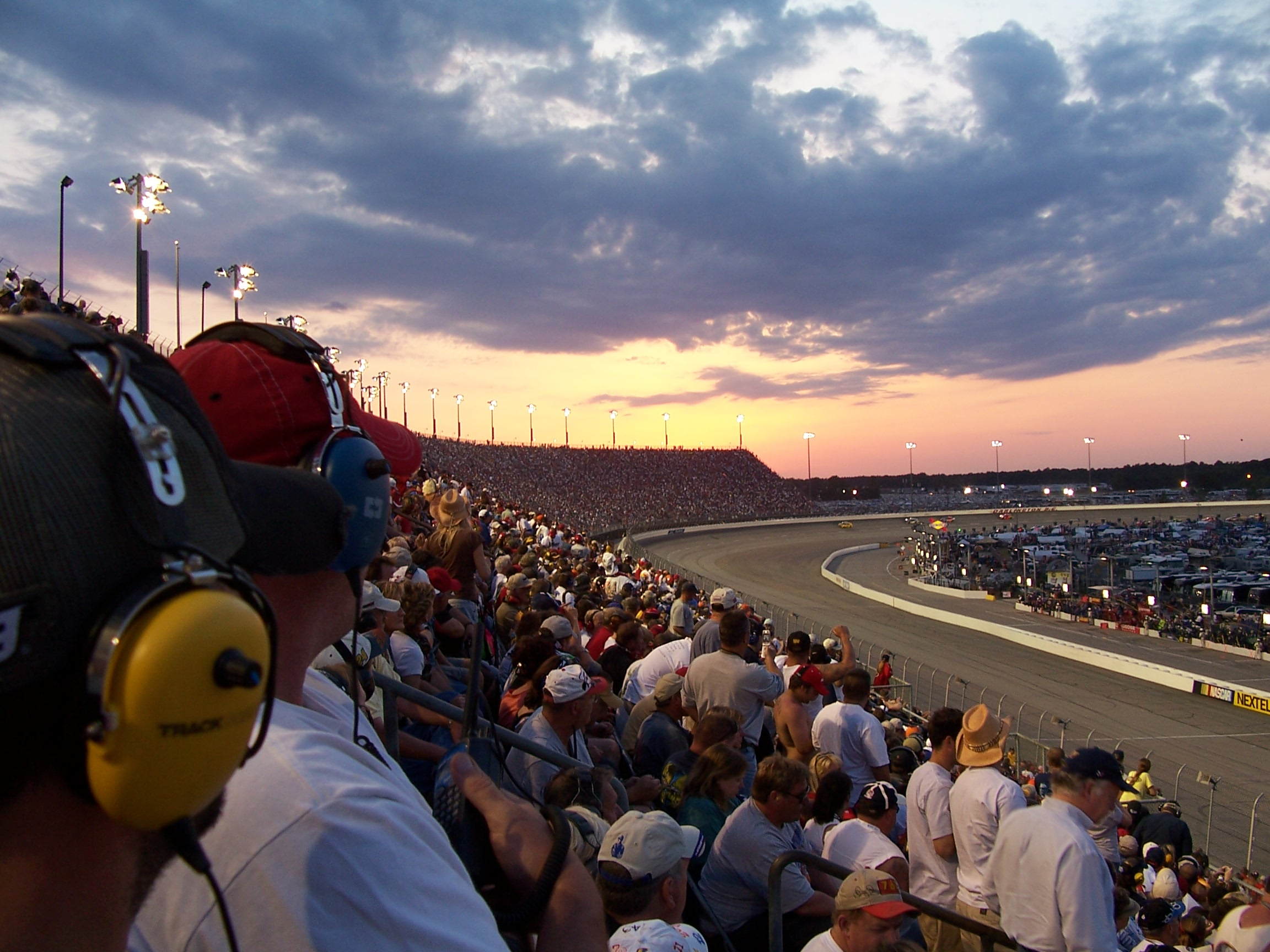
Darlington Raceway where the race was held.

Darlington Raceway is a race track built for NASCAR racing located near Darlington, South Carolina. It is nicknamed "The Lady in Black" and "The Track Too Tough to Tame" by many NASCAR fans and drivers and advertised as "A NASCAR Tradition." It is of a unique, somewhat egg-shaped design, an oval with the ends of very different configurations, a condition which supposedly arose from the proximity of one end of the track to a minnow pond the owner refused to relocate. This situation makes it very challenging for the crews to set up their cars' handling in a way that is effective at both ends.

Since 2015, the race has hosted NASCAR's Throwback weekend, which features cars sporting paint schemes that pay homage to past teams and drivers. (The lineage of this race includes races billed as the Southern 500 from 2005 to 2020.)

==== Entry list ====
- (R) denotes rookie driver.
- (i) denotes the driver ineligible for series driver points.

No.	Driver	Team	Manufacturer	Sponsor or throwback
1	Ross Chastain	Trackhouse Racing	Chevrolet	Busch Light – Kevin Harvick's No. 4 paint scheme that raced during the 2016 season
2	Austin Cindric	Team Penske	Ford	Freightliner
3	Austin Dillon	Richard Childress Racing	Chevrolet	Bass Pro Shops – Dale Earnhardt's paint scheme from the 1998 NASCAR All-Star Race
4	Josh Berry (R)	Stewart–Haas Racing	Ford	Harrison's – Tribute to crew chief Rodney Childers' No. 54 Fire Protection paint scheme that raced during the 1998 Late Models season
5	Kyle Larson	Hendrick Motorsports	Chevrolet	HendrickCars.com – Terry Labonte's Kellogg's Corn Flakes paint scheme that raced during his 1996 championship run
6	Brad Keselowski	RFK Racing	Ford	Castrol – Tribute to the 1996 Castrol TOM'S Toyota Supra A80 that won the 1997 and 1999 All Japan Grand Touring Car Championship titles
7	Corey LaJoie	Spire Motorsports	Chevrolet	Razzle Dazzle Premium Grapes – LaJoie's No. 07 Capitol Collision Services paint scheme that raced to his first touring series win during the 2012 NASCAR K&N Pro Series East season
8	Kyle Busch	Richard Childress Racing	Chevrolet	Zone
9	Chase Elliott	Hendrick Motorsports	Chevrolet	UniFirst – Dale Earnhardt Jr.'s No. 88 National Guard paint scheme that won at the 2014 Daytona 500
10	Noah Gragson	Stewart–Haas Racing	Ford	Overstock.com
11	Denny Hamlin	Joe Gibbs Racing	Toyota	Yahoo!
12	Ryan Blaney	Team Penske	Ford	Menards/Maytag
14	Chase Briscoe	Stewart–Haas Racing	Ford	Mahindra Tractors – Tribute to Richard and Kevin Briscoe's sprint car racing team
15	Kaz Grala	Rick Ware Racing	Ford	N29 Capital Partners – Tribute to Parnelli Jones' Ford Mustang Boss 302 that raced during the 1969 Trans-American Sedan Championship
16	Derek Kraus	Kaulig Racing	Chevrolet	Project Wyoming
17	Chris Buescher	RFK Racing	Ford	Fifth Third Bank
19	Martin Truex Jr.	Joe Gibbs Racing	Toyota	Auto-Owners Insurance – Truex's No. 78 paint scheme that won at the 2016 Bojangles' Southern 500
20	Christopher Bell	Joe Gibbs Racing	Toyota	DeWalt – 100th anniversary paint scheme
21	Harrison Burton	Wood Brothers Racing	Ford	DEX Imaging – Tribute to the "Leonard Wood Special" car raced during the team's early years
22	Joey Logano	Team Penske	Ford	Shell Pennzoil
23	Bubba Wallace	23XI Racing	Toyota	McDonald's
24	William Byron	Hendrick Motorsports	Chevrolet	Axalta – Jeff Gordon's DuPont "Firestorm" paint scheme that raced during the 2009, 2010, and 2011 seasons
31	Daniel Hemric	Kaulig Racing	Chevrolet	Black’s Tire Service
34	Michael McDowell	Front Row Motorsports	Ford	Long John Silver's – paint scheme inspired by the sponsor's 1970s branding
38	Todd Gilliland	Front Row Motorsports	Ford	Gener8tor – Gilliland's No. 98 paint scheme that raced during the 2015 CARS Tour season, when he won the inaugural race at Southern National Motorsports Park
41	Ryan Preece	Stewart–Haas Racing	Ford	United Rentals – Preece's No. 16 paint scheme raced during his 2013 championship run in the NASCAR Whelen Modified Tour
42	John Hunter Nemechek	Legacy Motor Club	Toyota	Family Dollar – Petty Family 75th anniversary tribute to Lee Petty's 1956 Dodge Coronet race car
43	Erik Jones	Legacy Motor Club	Toyota	AdventHealth – Petty Family 75th anniversary tribute to Richard Petty's 1959 Plymouth Savoy race car
45	Tyler Reddick	23XI Racing	Toyota	MoneyLion – Tim Richmond's No. 29 Motorcraft paint scheme that failed to qualify for the 1982 Daytona 500.
47	Ricky Stenhouse Jr.	JTG Daugherty Racing	Chevrolet	Kroger/Oscar Mayer/Kraft/Sara Lee Artesano – Mark Martin's No. 6 Oscar Mayer/Miracle Whip paint scheme that raced at the 2004 Budweiser Shootout
48	Alex Bowman	Hendrick Motorsports	Chevrolet	Ally Financial – Jimmie Johnson's Lowe's paint scheme that raced during his rookie season in 2002
51	Justin Haley	Rick Ware Racing	Ford	North Carolina National Fraternal Order of Police
54	Ty Gibbs	Joe Gibbs Racing	Toyota	He Gets Us/Monster Energy
71	Zane Smith (R)	Spire Motorsports	Chevrolet	Focused Health – Tribute to Dave Marcis
77	Carson Hocevar (R)	Spire Motorsports	Chevrolet	Premier Security Solutions NLEOMF
99	Daniel Suárez	Trackhouse Racing	Chevrolet	Quaker State – Tribute to Adrián Fernández's No. 5 Aguri–Fernández Racing Quaker State/Tecate paint scheme that raced during the 2004 IndyCar Series season
Official entry list

== Practice ==
Michael McDowell was the fastest in the practice session with a time of 29.022 seconds and a speed of 169.444 mph (272.694 km/h).

=== Practice results ===
Pos	No.	Driver	Team	Manufacturer	Time	Speed
1	34	Michael McDowell	Front Row Motorsports	Ford	29.022	169.444
2	54	Ty Gibbs	Joe Gibbs Racing	Toyota	29.173	168.567
3	17	Chris Buescher	RFK Racing	Ford	29.192	168.457
Official practice results

== Qualifying ==
Tyler Reddick scored the pole for the race with a time of 28.906 and a speed of 170.124 mph (273.788 km/h).

=== Qualifying results ===
Pos	No.	Driver	Team	Manufacturer	R1	R2
1	45	Tyler Reddick	23XI Racing	Toyota	28.625	28.906
2	6	Brad Keselowski	RFK Racing	Ford	28.716	28.924
3	17	Chris Buescher	RFK Racing	Ford	28.604	29.005
4	54	Ty Gibbs	Joe Gibbs Racing	Toyota	28.772	29.014
5	24	William Byron	Hendrick Motorsports	Chevrolet	28.791	29.030
6	5	Kyle Larson	Hendrick Motorsports	Chevrolet	28.750	29.034
7	11	Denny Hamlin	Joe Gibbs Racing	Toyota	28.650	29.045
8	23	Bubba Wallace	23XI Racing	Toyota	28.709	29.068
9	1	Ross Chastain	Trackhouse Racing	Chevrolet	28.780	29.098
10	19	Martin Truex Jr.	Joe Gibbs Racing	Toyota	28.752	29.821
11	8	Kyle Busch	Richard Childress Racing	Chevrolet	28.780	—
12	20	Christopher Bell	Joe Gibbs Racing	Toyota	28.854	—
13	14	Chase Briscoe	Stewart-Haas Racing	Ford	28.833	—
14	22	Joey Logano	Team Penske	Ford	28.915	—
15	38	Todd Gilliland	Front Row Motorsports	Ford	28.839	—
16	34	Michael McDowell	Front Row Motorsports	Ford	28.999	—
17	12	Ryan Blaney	Team Penske	Ford	28.842	—
18	48	Alex Bowman	Hendrick Motorsports	Chevrolet	29.003	—
19	99	Daniel Suárez	Trackhouse Racing	Chevrolet	28.873	—
20	47	Ricky Stenhouse Jr.	JTG Daugherty Racing	Chevrolet	29.046	—
21	77	Carson Hocevar (R)	Spire Motorsports	Chevrolet	28.902	—
22	42	John Hunter Nemechek	Legacy Motor Club	Toyota	29.120	—
23	3	Austin Dillon	Richard Childress Racing	Chevrolet	28.934	—
24	7	Corey LaJoie	Spire Motorsports	Chevrolet	29.188	—
25	2	Austin Cindric	Team Penske	Ford	28.985	—
26	41	Ryan Preece	Stewart-Haas Racing	Ford	29.270	—
27	71	Zane Smith (R)	Spire Motorsports	Chevrolet	29.050	—
28	51	Justin Haley	Rick Ware Racing	Ford	29.272	—
29	31	Daniel Hemric	Kaulig Racing	Chevrolet	29.054	—
30	43	Erik Jones	Legacy Motor Club	Toyota	29.294	—
31	9	Chase Elliott	Hendrick Motorsports	Chevrolet	29.061	—
32	16	Derek Kraus	Kaulig Racing	Chevrolet	29.452	—
33	4	Josh Berry (R)	Stewart-Haas Racing	Ford	29.115	—
34	15	Kaz Grala (R)	Rick Ware Racing	Ford	29.628	—
35	21	Harrison Burton	Wood Brothers Racing	Ford	29.194	—
36	10	Noah Gragson	Stewart-Haas Racing	Ford	29.756	—
Official qualifying results

== Race ==
=== Race results ===
==== Stage results ====
Stage One Laps: 90

Pos	No	Driver	Team	Manufacturer	Points
1	5	Kyle Larson	Hendrick Motorsports	Chevrolet	10
2	54	Ty Gibbs	Joe Gibbs Racing	Toyota	9
3	6	Brad Keselowski	RFK Racing	Ford	8
4	45	Tyler Reddick	23XI Racing	Toyota	7
5	19	Martin Truex Jr.	Joe Gibbs Racing	Toyota	6
6	38	Todd Gilliland	Front Row Motorsports	Ford	5
7	17	Chris Buescher	RFK Racing	Ford	4
8	12	Ryan Blaney	Team Penske	Ford	3
9	24	William Byron	Hendrick Motorsports	Chevrolet	2
10	23	Bubba Wallace	23XI Racing	Toyota	1
Official stage one results

Stage Two Laps: 95

Pos	No	Driver	Team	Manufacturer	Points
1	45	Tyler Reddick	23XI Racing	Toyota	10
2	6	Brad Keselowski	RFK Racing	Ford	9
3	54	Ty Gibbs	Joe Gibbs Racing	Toyota	8
4	22	Joey Logano	Team Penske	Ford	7
5	5	Kyle Larson	Hendrick Motorsports	Chevrolet	6
6	24	William Byron	Hendrick Motorsports	Chevrolet	5
7	17	Chris Buescher	RFK Racing	Ford	4
8	11	Denny Hamlin	Joe Gibbs Racing	Toyota	3
9	23	Bubba Wallace	23XI Racing	Toyota	2
10	1	Ross Chastain	Trackhouse Racing	Chevrolet	1
Official stage two results

=== Final Stage results ===
Stage Three Laps: 108

Pos	Grid	No	Driver	Team	Manufacturer	Laps	Points
1	2	6	Brad Keselowski	RFK Racing	Ford	293	57
2	4	54	Ty Gibbs	Joe Gibbs Racing	Toyota	293	52
3	33	4	Josh Berry (R)	Stewart-Haas Racing	Ford	293	34
4	7	11	Denny Hamlin	Joe Gibbs Racing	Toyota	293	36
5	13	14	Chase Briscoe	Stewart-Haas Racing	Ford	293	32
6	5	24	William Byron	Hendrick Motorsports	Chevrolet	293	38
7	8	23	Bubba Wallace	23XI Racing	Toyota	293	33
8	18	48	Alex Bowman	Hendrick Motorsports	Chevrolet	293	29
9	28	51	Justin Haley	Rick Ware Racing	Ford	293	28
10	16	34	Michael McDowell	Front Row Motorsports	Ford	293	27
11	9	1	Ross Chastain	Trackhouse Racing	Chevrolet	293	27
12	31	9	Chase Elliott	Hendrick Motorsports	Chevrolet	293	25
13	12	20	Christopher Bell	Joe Gibbs Racing	Toyota	293	24
14	36	10	Noah Gragson	Stewart-Haas Racing	Ford	293	23
15	15	38	Todd Gilliland	Front Row Motorsports	Ford	293	27
16	24	7	Corey LaJoie	Spire Motorsports	Chevrolet	293	21
17	26	41	Ryan Preece	Stewart-Haas Racing	Ford	293	20
18	34	15	Kaz Grala (R)	Rick Ware Racing	Ford	293	19
19	30	43	Erik Jones	Legacy Motor Club	Toyota	293	18
20	25	2	Austin Cindric	Team Penske	Ford	293	17
21	14	22	Joey Logano	Team Penske	Ford	293	23
22	35	21	Harrison Burton	Wood Brothers Racing	Ford	293	15
23	20	47	Ricky Stenhouse Jr.	JTG Daugherty Racing	Chevrolet	293	14
24	19	99	Daniel Suárez	Trackhouse Racing	Chevrolet	293	13
25	10	19	Martin Truex Jr.	Joe Gibbs Racing	Toyota	293	18
26	21	77	Carson Hocevar (R)	Spire Motorsports	Chevrolet	293	11
27	11	8	Kyle Busch	Richard Childress Racing	Chevrolet	293	10
28	23	3	Austin Dillon	Richard Childress Racing	Chevrolet	293	9
29	32	16	Derek Kraus	Kaulig Racing	Chevrolet	292	8
30	3	17	Chris Buescher	RFK Racing	Ford	291	15
31	22	42	John Hunter Nemechek	Legacy Motor Club	Toyota	291	6
32	1	45	Tyler Reddick	23XI Racing	Toyota	291	22
33	29	31	Daniel Hemric	Kaulig Racing	Chevrolet	290	4
34	6	5	Kyle Larson	Hendrick Motorsports	Chevrolet	252	19
35	27	71	Zane Smith (R)	Spire Motorsports	Chevrolet	161	2
36	17	12	Ryan Blaney	Team Penske	Ford	129	4
Official race results

=== Race statistics ===
- Lead changes: 16 among 10 different drivers
- Cautions/Laps: 6 for 38 laps
- Red flags: 0
- Time of race: 3 hours, 12 minutes, and 30 seconds
- Average speed: 124.75 miles per hour (200.77 km/h)

== Media ==
=== Television ===
The race will be carried by FS1 in the United States. Mike Joy, Clint Bowyer and Kevin Harvick will call the race from the broadcast booth. Jamie Little and Regan Smith will handle the pit road for the television side. Larry McReynolds provide insight from the Fox Sports studio in Charlotte.

FS1
Booth announcers	Pit reporters	In-race analyst
Lap-by-lap: Mike Joy; Color-commentator: Clint Bowyer; Color-commentator: Kevin Harvick	Jamie Little; Regan Smith	Larry McReynolds

=== Radio ===
MRN will have the radio call for the race, which will also be simulcasted on Sirius XM NASCAR Radio.

MRN Radio
Booth announcers	Turn announcers	Pit reporters
Lead announcer: Alex Hayden; Announcer: Jeff Striegle; Announcer: Todd Gordon	Turns 1 & 2: Dave Moody; Turns 3 & 4: Mike Bagley	Steve Post; Kim Coon; Chris Wilner; Brienne Pedigo

== Standings after the race ==
Drivers' Championship standings

	Pos	Driver	Points
	1	Kyle Larson	486
	2	Martin Truex Jr.	456 (–30)
1	3	Denny Hamlin	447 (–39)
1	4	Chase Elliott	437 (–49)
2	5	William Byron	400 (–86)
1	6	Tyler Reddick	396 (–90)
1	7	Ty Gibbs	390 (–96)
2	8	Ryan Blaney	371 (–115)
	9	Alex Bowman	365 (–121)
	10	Ross Chastain	358 (–128)
4	11	Brad Keselowski	344 (–142)
1	12	Chris Buescher	331 (–155)
1	13	Kyle Busch	324 (–162)
	14	Chase Briscoe	322 (–164)
2	15	Christopher Bell	320 (–166)
	16	Bubba Wallace	316 (–170)
Official driver's standings

Manufacturers' Championship standings

Pos	Manufacturer	Points
1	Chevrolet	477
2	Toyota	470 (–7)
3	Ford	438 (–39)

- Note: Only the first 16 positions are included for the driver standings.
- . – Driver has clinched a position in the NASCAR Cup Series playoffs.

Previous race: 2024 AdventHealth 400	NASCAR Cup Series; 2024 season	Next race: 2024 Coca-Cola 600
