= Daytona Speedweek =

Racing event series in Daytona, Florida

Daytona Speedweek presented by AdventHealth is a series of racing events that take place during January and February at Daytona International Speedway. Traditionally leading up to the Daytona 500, in 2021 it concluded with the Daytona road course race.

Nearby tracks New Smyrna Speedway and Volusia County Speedway also run special events during the period. There is also a Monster Jam event held at EverBank Field in Jacksonville, Florida. In 2021 due to the ongoing COVID-19 pandemic Monster Energy Supercross raced at Camping World Stadium in Orlando which is about an hour South of the speedway. The races took place on February 13 and 20, which was the same day as both NASCAR Xfinity Series races at the speedway.

== January ==
Through 2014, Speedweeks informally kicked off in early January with off-season testing at Daytona. The NASCAR Cup Series, Xfinity Series, and NASCAR Camping World Truck Series regularly conducted annual preseason tests on the 2.5 mi (4.0 km) oval, under the moniker "Preseason Thunder". From 2015-2021, the January test sessions were removed as part of NASCAR's overall ban on private testing. In January 2022 Preseason Thunder returned as a two-day test with only the NASCAR Cup Series, in order to test the Next Gen car.

In mid-January, the ARCA Menards Series has a two day test held on Friday and Saturday.

Also in January, the WeatherTech SportsCar Championship and the Michelin Pilot Challenge conducts a test session on the Daytona road course, in preparations for the Rolex 24. It is nicknamed the "Roar Before the 24." During this test session the IMSA Prototype Challenge series which is a feeder division for the WeatherTech SportsCar Championship has a 3 hour race usually held Saturday afternoon during the weekend of events. The first race for the series was held in 2018 and was originally 1 hour and 45 minutes. Before 2021 the Roar Before the 24 was held the first weekend in January but since 2021 it has been the weekend before the Rolex 24. Starting in 2021 the IMSA WeatherTech Sportscar championship will have a 100 minute race to start the line up for the Rolex 24. The race takes place on Sunday afternoon during the Roar Before the 24. Also starting in 2021 the roar before the 24 will be the weekend before the Rolex 24. Originally it was the first weekend in January but due to ongoing COVID-19 and travel problems in 2021 the race was rescheduled. In 2023 The IMSA Prototype Challenge race was dropped because of the lack of entries in the series. IMSA has since replaced the Prototype Challenge series with the new VP Fuels Sports Car Challenge series which uses the LMP3 car, they were part of the Prototype Challenge and have also added GT4 cars like used in the Michelin Pilot Challenge. The new format will be two 30 min. sprint races with one being held on Saturday and Sunday respectively. Also in 2023 the WeatherTech SportsCar Championship dropped the 100 min. qualifying race which was used in both 2021 and 2022. The series will go back to using a 15 minute qualifying session for each class like they have used before hand. Before 2021, Rolex 24 qualifying was held the Thursday before The 24 hours but in 2023 it will be held during the Roar Before The 24 on Sunday.

== 24 Hours of Daytona ==
The first major event of Speedweeks is the 24 Hours of Daytona. Currently it is held the final weekend of January, which is also on the weekend of the conference championship games of the NFL Playoffs due to the Pro Bowl now being the bye week for the Super Bowl since the 2021 NFL season made an adjustment that became a 17-game schedule. This weekend has been specifically chosen to avoid conflict with the Super Bowl. Before 2006 the Rolex 24 was held the first weekend in February which was the weekend directly before NASCAR events started and the same day as the Super Bowl.

Before the 24 Hour race weekend, Speedweeks kicks off with "Roar Before The 24" weekend, which includes practice sessions for all IMSA and support races on the card, with sessions across Friday, Saturday, and Sunday.

In 2021, a 100-minute qualifying race was added to Roar weekend which set the grid for the 24 hour race the following weekend. This also took place in 2022 but was removed for 2023.

In 2021 the Mazda Global MX-5 Cup series was added to the IMSA card, with two races across Thursday evening and Friday morning.

The second weekend features two events:

- Michelin Pilot Challenge Round 1 - 4 hour endurance - Friday before the 24h race weekend
- 24 Hours of Daytona (Thursday-Sunday) (practice Thursday and Friday, race starts late Saturday afternoon and ends late Sunday afternoon.)

== Daytona 500 week ==
Following the Rolex 24, there is no track activity for two weeks. This prevents a conflict with the Super Bowl. During this time, track officials clean the track and make final preparations for the arrival of stock cars and the increased number of spectators.

Typically, stock car action would begin as early as 10 days before the Daytona 500 with practice sessions, qualifying sessions and races, support series races, exhibition races, and other events.

Because of Super Bowl LV in 2021 in nearby Tampa, NASCAR originally planned consolidation down to a single "Speedweek" of stock car action However, with COVID-19 restrictions in California, NASCAR announced on December 8, 2020, that Speedweeks will instead be two weeks with the Daytona road course races being the final race of the meeting, instead of the Daytona 500. The oval will be the first week, the road course on the second. The single Speedweek plan continued ahead for 2022.

=== Schedule ===
==== Wednesday ====
- NASCAR Cup Series: Practice 1 (afternoon)
- NASCAR Cup Series: Qualifying (evening)

==== Thursday ====
- ARCA Menards Series: Practice (afternoon)
- NASCAR Craftsman Truck Series: Practice (afternoon)
- NASCAR Cup Series: Duel Qualifying Races (evening)

==== Friday ====
- ARCA Menards Series: Qualifying (afternoon)
- NASCAR Craftsman Truck Series: Qualifying (afternoon)
- NASCAR O'Reilly Auto Parts Series: Practice (afternoon)
- NASCAR Cup Series: Practice 2 (afternoon)
- NASCAR Craftsman Truck Series: Fresh from Florida 250 (evening)

==== Saturday ====
- NASCAR O'Reilly Auto Parts Series: Qualifying (morning)
- ARCA Menards Series: General Tire 200 (noon)
- NASCAR Cup Series: Final Practice (afternoon)
- NASCAR O'Reilly Auto Parts Series: United Rentals 300 (starts in late afternoon and finishes after sunset)

==== Sunday ====
- NASCAR Cup Series: Daytona 500 (start in mid-afternoon, finish shortly after sunset)

== History ==
2010 Speedweeks logo

Budweiser Speedweeks logo

In 2004, the Hershey Kisses 300 was stopped on Saturday for rain. The race could not continue on Sunday due to the 46th running of the Daytona 500. The race was completed on Monday, with Dale Earnhardt Jr. winning both the Busch Series race and Cup race in the same weekend.

In 2005, a 5K run was added to the Speedweeks schedule, as part of the Rolex 24.

In 2007, the IndyCar Series hosted an open test on the road course configuration during the week after the Rolex 24. No race was scheduled, however.

In 2012, the Daytona 500 was postponed for the first time in race history.

In 2013, Budweiser became title sponsor of Speedweeks.

Starting with the 2019 season, AdventHealth replaced Budweiser as the official sponsor of Speedweeks in a multi-year agreement.

In 2021, a one-off extra weekend of Daytona road course races (originally a replacement race in 2020 for Watkins Glen) was added for the fourth week in Speedweeks, as a replacement for the cancelled Auto Club Speedway weekend because of California COVID government restrictions. In 2022, the Busch Clash was removed from the Speedweeks as it was moved to the Los Angeles Memorial Coliseum.

=== Former names ===
- Daytona Speedweeks
- DirecTV Speedweeks
- Hershey's Milk & Milkshake Speedweeks
- Budweiser Speedweeks

=== Former events during Speedweeks ===
- International Race of Champions (usually held on Friday)
- Daytona 500 consolation race
- NASCAR Dash Series Daytona 200 (usually held the same day as the Busch Clash)
- UNOH Battle at the Beach (held Monday and Tuesday prior to the Daytona 500, discontinued after grandstands used for the event were torn down)
- Ferrari Challenge: Two races that were held during the Rolex 24 weekend. The first race was normally held on Thursday and the second race being held on Friday. In 2022, the races were held in April as a stand alone event.
- Daytona road course weekend (one-off replacement for Auto Club 400 in 2021 after that race was cancelled due to COVID-19 pandemic in California):
  - BrakeBest Brake Pads 159 (Truck Series, Friday night the week after Daytona 500 weekend)
  - Super Start Batteries 188 (Xfinity Series, Saturday evening)
  - O'Reilly Auto Parts 253 (Cup Series, Sunday afternoon)
- Busch Clash (held Tuesday before the Daytona 500; moved to Los Angeles Memorial Coliseum for 2022)
- IMSA Prototype Challenge: Race was held on Saturday of The Roar Before the 24 test weekend. The race was held from 2018 until 2022.

== See also ==
- Daytona Beach Bike Week
