= Wheatley Vodka Clash =

Exhibition auto race held in Daytona Beach, Flordia

NASCAR Cup Series
- Venue: Daytona International Speedway
- Location: Daytona Beach, Florida, United States
- Corporate sponsor: Wheatley Vodka
- First race: 1979
- Previous names: Busch Clash (1979–1997; 2020–2021); Bud Shootout (1998–2000); Budweiser Shootout (2001–2012); Sprint Unlimited (2013–2016); Advance Auto Parts Clash (2017–2019); Busch Light Clash at the Coliseum (2022–2024); Cook Out Clash at Bowman Gray Stadium (2025–2026)
- Most wins (driver): Dale Earnhardt (6)
- Most wins (team): Joe Gibbs Racing (12)
- Most wins (manufacturer): Chevrolet (22)

Circuit information
- Surface: Asphalt
- Length: 2.5 mi (4.0 km)
- Turns: 4

The Wheatley Vodka Clash is an annual non-championship pre-season NASCAR Cup Series exhibition event held in February before the season-opening Daytona 500. The event was held each year at Daytona International Speedway from the race's inception in 1979 until 2021, after which it was moved to the Los Angeles Memorial Coliseum in 2022 as part of launching the seventh-generation chassis. In 2025, the Clash was moved to Bowman Gray Stadium before being placed back at Daytona in 2027. Previously at Daytona, the race, along with the ARCA Menards Series' season-opening General Tire 200, served as the kickoff events for Daytona Speedweeks. The event is one of two non-points races on the Cup Series schedule, the other being the NASCAR All-Star Race.

The event has been sponsored by Anheuser-Busch (which owns the Busch Beer and Budweiser brands) for most of its history. In 2013, Anheuser-Busch moved their Daytona Speedweeks race sponsorship to the Duel races after the departure of longtime Duel title sponsor Gatorade. Cup Series title sponsor Sprint became the title sponsor for this race, which was renamed from "The Shootout" to "The Unlimited" (to promote Sprint's cell phone unlimited plan). When Sprint left NASCAR after the 2016 season, Advance Auto Parts became the title sponsor in 2017 and the event was renamed to its original name of "The Clash". Advance Auto Parts did not return as the title sponsor in 2020, which opened the door for Anheuser-Busch (which dropped its sponsorship of the Duel races in 2016) returned for a second stint as the title sponsor, and the Busch Clash name was brought back. This lasted until 2024, when Cook Out restaurant chain replaced Busch when the race moved to Bowman Gray Stadium in 2025. In 2027, the race was moved back to Daytona with the Wheatley Vodka Clash.

== Background and history ==
The event was first known as the Busch Clash and was the brain child of Monty Roberts. Roberts was the brand manager of the newly formed Busch Beer (formerly Busch Bavarian Beer) and the race was seen as a way to promote the new brand. Roberts had been successful introducing Mercury into racing while working at Ford, and had also been a part of Ontario Motor Speedway. His experiences led him to believe that racing fans were loyal brand followers. The initial format was set up as a 50-mile sprint race, with no pit stops, with a field consisting of the previous season's pole position winners. Inviting the fastest drivers from the previous season headlined the event as the "fastest race" of the season. The race established an incentive for drivers to earn pole positions during the NASCAR season, which up to that time, still offered relatively tiny cash prizes. Likewise, at no time have pole winners earned bonus championship points.

The event was also seen as a way to expand the Speedweeks activities leading up to the Daytona 500. Previously, the weekend before the Daytona 500 featured only minor support events, and the Winston Cup competitors ordinarily would not have taken to the track until Wednesday. The Busch Clash allowed the Winston Cup regulars to kick off the week live on CBS.

The 1987 race, won by Bill Elliott, was completed at an average speed of 197.802 mph. It stands as the fastest sanctioned race in the history of NASCAR (though it was not an official points-paying event).

The 2013 race (renamed the Sprint Unlimited at Daytona) introduced a new format incorporating the results of fan voting into certain aspects of the race.

In 2017, the race was renamed the Advance Auto Parts Clash after Advance Auto Parts signed a multi-year deal to sponsor the event. The 2017 race was delayed to Sunday due to persistent rain, marking the first time the race has been run during the day since 2006.

In 2020, Busch Beer returned to assume naming rights for the race, once again dubbing it the Busch Clash.

In 2021, the race was run on the road course layout, originally intended as a temporary effort in order to have teams use a sixth-generation chassis when the seventh-generation chassis was to have debuted at the Daytona 500 that year. Teams would not have had enough seventh-generation cars available for the Daytona 500, so NASCAR intended to use the sixth-generation road course car (which can be repurposed into an Xfinity Series chassis) at Daytona for cost savings.

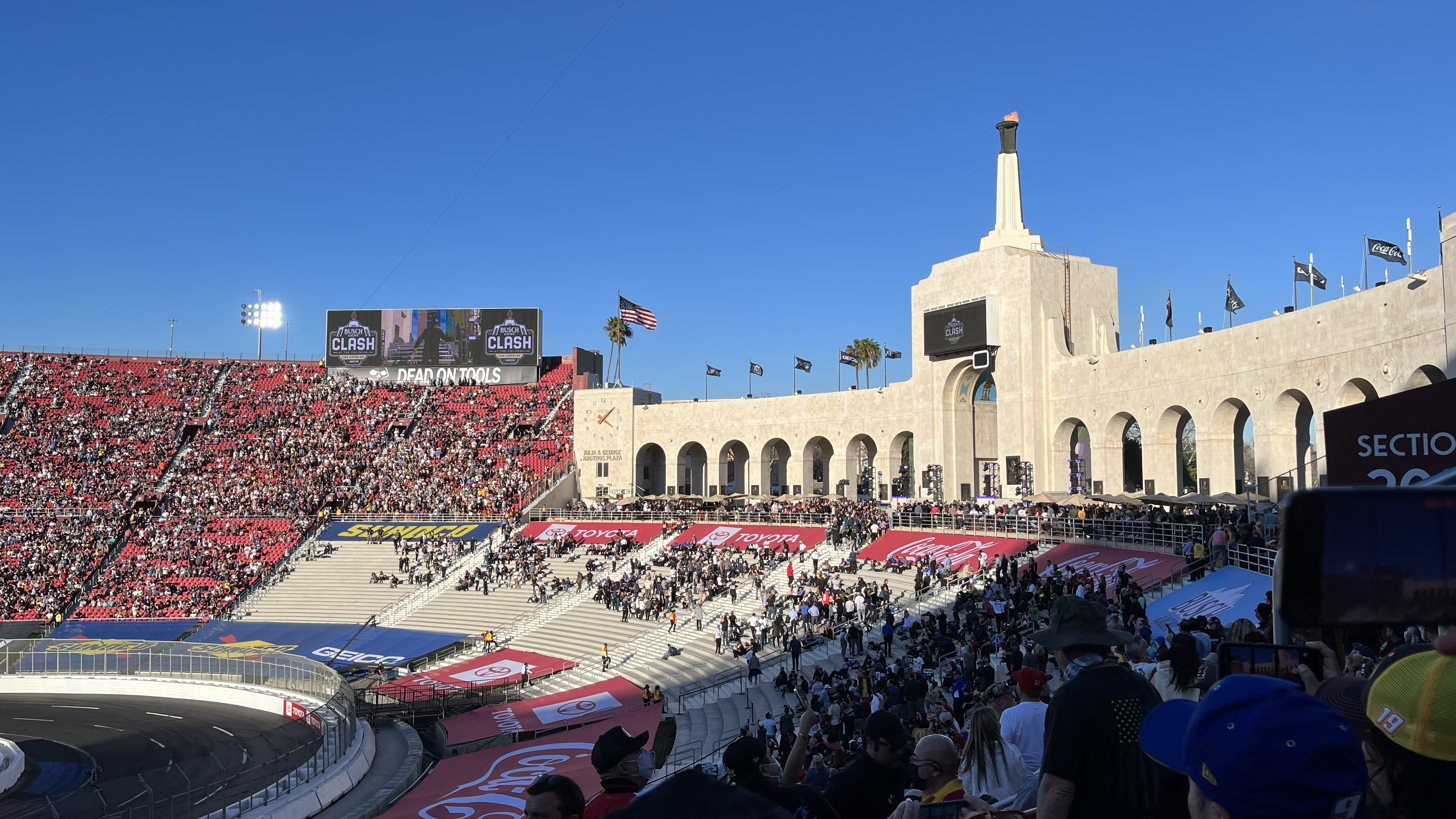
Spectators at the LA Memorial Coliseum for the 2022 Clash

Originally, it was planned that the 2022 Clash would return to a standard schedule (the 2021 Speedweeks schedule was shortened because of Super Bowl LV in nearby Tampa), taking place with sixth-generation cars on the road course. That changed when the 2021-22 NFL year moved Super Bowl LVI back a week and into the traditional Speedweeks date after the 2022 Daytona 500 date was announced. NASCAR then moved the renamed Busch Light Clash to the Los Angeles Memorial Coliseum, meaning the event would be held away from Daytona for the first time, and during the NFL's off-week between the conference championship games and Super Bowl LVI, which was held in nearby Inglewood for the first time. In June 2022, NASCAR announced that the Clash at the Coliseum would return for 2023 and in September 2023, NASCAR announced again that the Clash at the Coliseum would return for 2024. The 2024 Clash was bumped up from the traditional Sunday race and moved to Saturday due to weather projections, thus making it general admission.

In 2025, the race was again renamed to the Cook Out Clash and moved to Bowman Gray Stadium.

In 2027, the race was moved back to Daytona.

== Race format ==
=== 1979–1990 ===
The race consisted of a single twenty-lap (50-mile) green flag sprint with no pit stops required. Caution flag laps would not count. A development series race, the Automobile Racing Club of America series, usually was featured as part of the event.

=== 1991–1997 ===
The race was broken into two ten-lap, green flag segments. The field was then inverted for the second ten-lap segment. Prize money was awarded for both segments for all positions. The race was broken up into two segments mainly because it had been lacking competitiveness since restrictor plates were introduced in 1988. The inversion rule added some needed excitement to the event, but its popularity continued to wane.

=== 1998–2000 ===
The event was renamed the Bud Shootout, and consisted of two 25-lap (62.5-mile) races, the Bud Shootout Qualifier at 11 am, and the Bud Shootout itself at 12 pm. One two-tire pit stop was required for each race. The winner of the qualifier advanced to the main event.

=== 2001–2002 ===
The event was renamed the Budweiser Shootout and expanded to a new distance, 70 laps (175 miles). Caution laps would be counted, but the finish had to be under green, with the Truck Series green-white-checker rule used if necessary. A minimum of one two-tire green flag pit stop was required. The Bud Shootout Qualifier was discontinued because second round qualifying for Cup races had been eliminated.

=== 2003–2008 ===
The race was broken up into two segments: a 20-lap segment, followed by a ten-minute intermission, concluding with a 50-lap second segment. While a pit stop was no longer required by rule, a reduction in fuel cell size (from 22 gallons to 13.5 gallons) made a fuel stop necessary. (In 2007, fuel cells were expanded to 18.5 gallons.) Many drivers also changed two tires during their fuel stop, as the time required to fuel the car allowed for a two-tire change without additional delay.

=== 2009–2012 ===
The first segment was expanded to 25 laps, followed by the 50-lap second segment. The total race distance was 75 laps (187.5 miles).

=== 2013–2015 ===
The race was divided into three segments (30 laps, 25 laps, 20-laps), with online fan voting deciding certain aspects of the race specifics (lengths of the segments, requirements for mandatory pit stops, number of drivers eliminated, etc.) The total race distance was 75 laps (187.5 miles). For 2013, the vote resulted in a mandatory four-tire pit stop, and no cars were eliminated. For 2014, voting set the starting lineup per final practice speeds and required mandatory pit stops after the second segment.

=== 2016–2020 ===
The race still kept its 75-lap distance, and returned to the 2003 format with one exception; the first segment was now 25 laps instead of 20 laps. The race originally consisted of a 20-lap/50-mile, "all-out sprint" for the previous season's pole position winners (considered the de facto "fastest drivers on the circuit") and added previous Daytona Pole Award winners, former Clash race winners, former Daytona 500 pole winners, and drivers who qualified for the preceding season's NASCAR playoffs. Any driver in the field had to have competed full-time in the Cup Series in 2016.

=== 2021 ===
The race was planned with the seventh-generation car changeover happening at the Daytona 500, which was postponed a year by supply chain and development issues from the pandemic lockdowns that severely altered the previous season. As a result, the race was moved to the road course using the previous sixth-generation cars to save teams resources and ensure the single-source new chassis (which teams did not have enough at the time) would not be potentially destroyed in crashes during the event after the previous season's Clash ended with incidents that few cars were remaining, to curb the blocking that created massive crashes. A 200 kilometer (126.35 miles to be exact) race, the segments were 15 and 20 laps, respectively.

=== 2022–2024 ===
On September 14, 2021, NASCAR announced that the Busch Clash would move to the Los Angeles Memorial Coliseum. On November 9, 2021, the format for the 2022 Clash was announced:

On December 21, 2022, NASCAR made further changes to the Busch Clash by expanding transfer positions from four to five cars in each heat, thereby expanding the field from 23 to 27 cars.

- The event was open for all teams and drivers for the first time in its history.
- A total of 350 laps in seven races.
- The 36 charter teams and up to four open teams participated in qualifying. Should more than 40 teams enter the race, the four fastest times in qualifying determine who advances to the heat races.
- Based on lap times, cars were put in one of four heat races of 25 laps each.
- The top four (2022) or five (2023) drivers in each 25-lap heat advanced to the feature.
- All non-advancing drivers in the 25-lap heats were assigned to one of two 50-lap "Last Chance Qualifiers (LCQs)."
- The top three drivers in each 50-lap LCQ formed the 17th-21st (2022) or 21st-26th (2023) starting positions in the feature, with the top three in the 1st LCQ lining up in the odd-numbered positions and the top 3 in the 2nd LCQ in the even-numbered positions.
- The highest driver in the previous year's Cup Series points standings not already advanced advanced to the feature in the last position (27th).
- The feature is 150 laps (green flag only in 2023).

=== 2025 ===
On August 17, 2024, it was announced that the Clash would move to Bowman Gray Stadium on February 2, 2025.

On January 21, 2025, NASCAR announced changes to the Clash, increasing the number of transfer positions from five cars per heat. As a result, the field size was adjusted from 27 cars back to 23 cars.

Changes for 2025 included the following:

- Heat Races – Four heat races of 25 laps each with only green flag laps counted. If the safety car is called in the final lap, the race is over. The top five from each heat race advance through to The Clash.
- B Main – One "B Main" style race of 75 green flag laps is used. Starting position determined by where they finished in their respective heat races. The LCQ race is 75 green flag laps, and would end if the safety car is called in the final lap. The top two finishers in the LCQ will transfer to The Clash. The provisional will continue to be used for the highest in points.
- A Main– The main event is now 200 green laps, with a break after 100 laps. If the safety car happens during Lap 200, the race will be extended.

The heat races were cancelled in 2026 due to a multi-day weather delay and starting positions were determined by speed in the practice sessions.

== Race eligibility ==
- 1979–2008: Pole position winners from the previous season clinched automatic berths. From 1979 to 2000, qualifying consisted of two rounds, one driver based on the second round qualifying format was automatically admitted.
  - 1979–1997, 2001: The drivers that were the fastest qualifiers for the previous year's races' during Busch second round qualifying (except for those who had won awards for first round qualifying had their names omitted) were eligible for one wild card spot. The wild card driver was selected by blind draw during the week of the January media tour (until 1981), or at NASCAR's end of season prizegiving banquet at the Waldorf-Astoria in December (1982-1997).
  - 1995–96: The winner of the most pole positions in the secondary NASCAR Busch Series won an entry into the Busch Clash as a wild card, driving a Busch-sponsored car. David Green won the right both times.
  - 1998–2000: Drivers eligible from second round qualifying participated in the Bud Shootout Qualifier, with the winner advancing to the main event Bud Shootout.
- 2002–08: All former winners of the event not already qualified received automatic berths.
- 2009: With the 2008 season being the first where Coors replaced Anheuser-Busch as the series' pole award sponsor, pole winners were no longer part of qualifying formats. The field consists of 28 cars. The top six teams from each manufacturer (Ford, Chevrolet, Dodge, and Toyota) based on owners' points from the previous season clinch berths, for a total of 24 cars. Unlike previous formats, the entry (team) receives the berth, not the driver. In addition, each of the four manufacturers receive one "wild card" berth for a car/driver not already qualified, to bring the grand total to 28 cars. The other four "entries" were for previous champions and past Shootout winners. This system was discarded after only one year as it was largely unpopular.
- 2010–11: A new qualifying format was introduced, which expanded the field, with no size limitations:
  - The 12 drivers from the previous season's NASCAR Playoffs
  - Previous Budweiser Shootout winners
  - Previous points-paying race winners at Daytona (Daytona 500 or Coke Zero 400)
  - Previous Sprint Cup champions
  - The last 10 Rookies of year (in 2010, it was only the reigning rookie of the year)
- 2012: The field was once again expanded. Automatic bids went to the top 25 in series points (every driver from defending series champion Tony Stewart through 25th place Brian Vickers), as well as any Daytona race winner who was not otherwise qualified and who competed in at least one race in 2011 (which enabled Bill Elliott, Geoff Bodine, Derrike Cope, Michael Waltrip, Jamie McMurray, Trevor Bayne, Terry Labonte, and Ken Schrader to make the race if they decide to run).
- 2013–14: With Sprint now taking over sponsorship of the race, the Speedway reverted to the 2002-08 format where all drivers who won pole positions via time trials (does not include winners of practice one, should qualifying not be held because of inclement weather) and previous winners of the event that have attempted to qualify for any of the 36 points races in the previous season are eligible. The driver does not have to win the then-Coors Light Pole Award (which could happen if the driver does not have a beer sticker) in order to claim an Unlimited seat, just set the fastest time in pole qualifying. The beer sticker mandate was also eliminated by the track.
- 2015–16: Eligibility was once again changed, with a minimum of 25 eligible entries. In addition to the traditional pole winners and former race winners, additional eligibility was added. These additional slots were awarded to:
  - The 16 drivers who made the Playoffs.
  - Previous Daytona 500 front row starters (both inside and outside polesitters) if they did not win a pole position at any of the other 35 races during the previous season
  - To ensure the field was 25 cars, if there were fewer than 25 drivers eligible, any remaining spots are filled by the highest drivers in the previous season's final point standings to not be automatically entered into the Unlimited on any of the other qualifications
- 2017–18: The minimum number of cars rule and the outside pole winners for the Daytona 500 rule were removed. The field consisted of pole winners, former Clash race winners, former Daytona 500 pole winners, and drivers who qualified for the NASCAR Playoffs. Similar to the 2009 format based on teams, NASCAR gave a special exemption for rookie Daniel Suárez since Joe Gibbs Racing already had a car prepared for Carl Edwards who surprisingly retired just a month before the race.
- 2019–20: Daytona 500 champions were also eligible to participate in the Clash. In addition, drivers in categories other than the traditional pole winners from the previous season (former Clash, Daytona 500 pole, and race winners, in addition to playoff drivers) must have participated full-time in the previous season.
- 2021: Due to the COVID-19 pandemic in 2020 where only five races (Daytona 500, Auto Club, and the first races at Las Vegas, Phoenix, and Charlotte) had pole qualifying, the eligibility requirements for the 2021 Clash were changed to the following:
  - Busch Pole Award winners from the five races where it was held.
  - Busch Clash winners who raced full-time in the previous season
  - Daytona 500 winners who raced full-time in the previous season
  - Daytona 500 Busch Pole Award winners who raced full-time in the previous season
  - Playoff drivers of the previous season
  - Race winners of the previous season
  - Stage winners of the previous season
- 2022–2026 All 36 chartered teams participate, and non-chartered teams may attempt to qualify for one of four positions for heat races, for one of 22 (2022), 26 (2023-2024), or 23 (2025) positions from heat races. The highest-ranked driver in final points standings that did not qualify will also advance to the feature.

== Race history ==
- 1979: The race debuted on Sunday, broadcast live on CBS. Pole position qualifying for the Daytona 500 would start Sunday at 10 am, followed by the ARCA 200. The Busch Clash would be held after the ARCA race at 3 pm.
- 1980: Heavy winds during Daytona 500 pole qualifying delayed the proceedings and the ARCA 200 began 90 minutes later than scheduled. As 3 pm approached, the ARCA race was red flagged and halted so that the Busch Clash could be held as scheduled and be shown on live television. After the Clash was finished, the ARCA race resumed.
- 1981: Morning rain washed out Daytona 500 pole qualifying, which was rescheduled for the following day. After the track dried Sunday, the ARCA race began at 2:30 pm. The Busch Clash, scheduled for 3 pm, was held following the delayed ARCA race.
- 1983: Rain washed out all scheduled activities for Sunday. The Busch Clash was rescheduled and run the following day, Monday.
- 1984: Ricky Rudd was spun off the track at turn four at a very high speed, resulting in a blowover, then a series of violent flips. Ricky suffered a concussion, and his eyes were so swollen that he had to tape them open so he could race in that Thursday's UNO Twin 125 and subsequent races (a practice prohibited since a 2013 rule change regarding concussion protocol, which Rudd would probably have been forced to miss three races at minimum). Rudd missed the inside wall during his wreck; during the second Twin 125, Randy Lajoie was not as fortunate. Combined with the previous year's Daytona 500 crashes, the apron was paved over in Turn 4 before the Firecracker 400 that July for drivers to save their cars in similar incidents.
- 1985: Track officials reorganized the schedule for track activities for the weekend. Daytona 500 pole qualifying was moved from Sunday to Saturday, and the Busch Clash was moved from 3 pm to 12 pm on Sunday. The ARCA 200 was then held after the Busch Clash rather than before.
- 1992: For one year, Daytona 500 pole qualifying and the Busch Clash swapped days. The Busch Clash was held Saturday, and qualifying was held Sunday. This move was made at the request of CBS, who wanted the additional time on Sunday for their coverage of the 1992 Winter Olympics.
- 1995: Morning rain delayed the start by 30 minutes.
- 2001: FOX broadcasts the race for the first time. It also marked the first race televised on Fox. The start time was shifted to 2 pm on Sundays.
- 2002: TNT broadcast the race for the first time.
- 2003: The race was run at night for the first time.
- 2004: A crash at the final lap resulted in controversy. A 2003 incident at Loudon involving Dale Jarrett and Casey Mears had resulted in the banning of racing back to the caution. In this case, NASCAR did not wave the caution at the end of the race despite a crash involving Ryan Newman and Jamie McMurray, and allow the race to run to the finish, creating a potentially dangerous situation. Ironically, Dale Jarrett won the race.
- 2005: The ARCA race was stopped for 45 minutes because of repairs to the catchfencing, and was stopped 15 laps short in order to prepare for the Budweiser Shootout.
- 2006: The event was postponed for the second time because of rain, moving from Saturday night to Sunday afternoon. This was also the first shootout to feature the green-white-checkered finish. Denny Hamlin became the first rookie to win the event in 2006 in his #11 car.
- 2007: Tony Stewart won the race for the third time driving his No. 20 car. It was the second win in a row for Joe Gibbs Racing because Denny Hamlin won in 2006.
- 2008: Dale Earnhardt Jr. won the race for the second time, and won in his first start with Hendrick Motorsports. He also made the record of leading the most laps, 47, during the shootout.
- 2009: Kevin Harvick, won the race for the first time on a last-lap pass reminiscent of his 2007 Daytona 500 last-lap pass on Mark Martin. This time however Harvick passed Jamie McMurray in Turn 3 for the win as an accident would occur behind Harvick, also the same scenario happened in the 500 for Harvick.
- 2010: All Daytona 500 qualifying weekend activity was moved to Saturday, as not to conflict with Super Bowl XLIV. Daytona 500 qualifying started at 12 noon, then the ARCA Lucas Oil Slick Mist 200 at 4:30 pm, and the Budweiser Shootout was held at 8 pm. Kevin Harvick won the race for the second time in a row, becoming the first driver to win it consecutively since Tony Stewart.
- 2011: After the track was repaved in the off-season, teams found tandem drafting to become prevalent at the restrictive plate tracks during the preseason. During the final laps, the lead pack of four cars ran single file, with Ryan Newman in the lead, followed by Denny Hamlin, then Kurt Busch, and then Jamie McMurray. Coming out of Turn 4 on the final lap, Busch and McMurray pulled to the outside, while Denny Hamlin pulled to the inside. Hamlin exceeds track limits in passing Newman for the win, with Busch and McMurray passing Newman legally. Upon as review, Hamlin was dropped to the last car on the lead lap, in 13th, for exceeding track limits and all other drivers on the lead lap gained a position, giving Busch the win.
- 2012: Kyle Busch won the race after passing Tony Stewart at the finish line. It was the closest finish in Bud Shootout history. The race itself, being the first Sprint Cup event under a new rules package designed to break up the controversial two-car tandem drafting of the previous year, was marked by three multi-car crashes during the race caused by drivers getting into the left-rear quarter panel of another car. The first crash happened in the first 25 lap segment when Paul Menard got into David Ragan in turn 2, starting an eight car crash. The drivers involved were: Kasey Kahne, Denny Hamlin, Matt Kenseth, Paul Menard, Jeff Burton, David Ragan, Juan Pablo Montoya and Michael Waltrip. The second one happened on lap 55, also in turn 2. This one started when Marcos Ambrose turned Joey Logano loose. Several other drivers were collected trying to avoid Logano, including Kenseth, Martin Truex Jr., Dale Earnhardt Jr. and Kevin Harvick. Harvick's brakes failed, and he ended up coasting down the apron with flames coming out from under his car, though they extinguished themselves before Harvick reached the garage. A third crash happened with two laps to go within regulation, when Jeff Gordon got into the back of eventual winner Kyle Busch on turn 4. While Kyle retained control of his car, Gordon shot up the banking and collected Jimmie Johnson, Jamie McMurray and Kurt Busch, and turned sideways on the driver's side door. Gordon was pushed down the track on his side for several hundred feet before his car barrel-rolled three times and came to a rest on his roof.
- 2013: Kevin Harvick won for the third time in the race. This was the first time the event was named the Sprint Unlimited. This race also marked the debut of the Sixth Generation car.
- 2014: Denny Hamlin won his second Unlimited by overtaking Brad Keselowski with drafting help from Kyle Busch with two laps to go. The first race under a new rules package that included a slightly taller spoiler, there were numerous wrecks, including a frightening wreck on lap 35 when Matt Kenseth was turned by Joey Logano in the trioval, collecting Kevin Harvick, Kurt Busch, Tony Stewart, Danica Patrick, Jeff Gordon, Carl Edwards and Ricky Stenhouse Jr., which saw Stenhouse's car first drive under Busch's rear wheels, lose its brakes and steering, before t-boning Patrick on the apron. The race also saw an incident during the break between the second and third segments in which the Holden Commodore safety car suffered an electrical fire with the wiring harness used to control the safety car lights suffered a wiring short circuit. There were 16 lead changes among seven drivers.
- 2015: Matt Kenseth won the race with Martin Truex Jr. challenging in the final laps. Brad Keselowski crashed hard on the front straight at lap 25, and Jamie McMurray caused the big one later in the race. After the race, defending series champion Kevin Harvick and Joey Logano were involved in an altercation after Logano's 22 sent Harvick's 4 into the turn four wall coming to the white flag.
- 2016: Hamlin took command of the field and moved ahead of the No. 2 car. Eventually, Keselowski moved by him coming to the line and took the lead on lap 34. Hamlin shot ahead of Keselowski on the backstretch to take the lead back the next lap. Keselowski used a push from teammate Joey Logano to retake the lead on lap 37. Just like his first stint in the lead, he picked up another piece of debris that covered his grill. The third caution of the race flew on lap 44 for a single-car spin on the backstretch. Going down the backstretch, Johnson made contact with Mears that sent him spinning through the grass. His car dug into the ground and ripped off the front fender. He said afterwards that he "did a decent job of backing out of there and not causing a big one as the door shut on me." Keselowski opted to stay out while the rest of the field opted to pit, The race restarted with two laps to go in overtime, The field passed the overtime line and the race was official at that point. After a multi-car wreck in turn 1, Hamlin was declared the race winner.
- 2017: The race was postponed from Saturday Night to Sunday Afternoon, the third rain postponement of the Clash. Kurt Busch lasted just shy of 20 laps as Jimmie Johnson got loose off of turn 4 and spun Busch. Denny Hamlin dominated and looked to be on his way to his fourth win in the event leading 48 laps. After leading at the white flag, Brad Keselowski made a move to the inside that Hamlin left open, which led to Hamlin driving into Keselowski in a failed attempt to block him, ultimately ending their chances at winning. As the collision happened, Keselowski's teammate Joey Logano was able to avoid the incident on the high side and ultimately won the event for the first time in his career over Kyle Busch and Alex Bowman. Danica Patrick managed to finish 4th after running 10th at the white flag.
- 2018: Unlike all the other years, except for 2006 and 2017, the race was held on Sunday Afternoon. The race saw only two caution flags, one for the end of the segment, and the other caused by Jamie McMurray crashing in turn 4 after contact with Kurt Busch on lap 34. He would ultimately be the only one not running at the end of the race. This was the first race where crew members only allow five men over the wall instead of six (catch can eliminated in refueling because of a new fuel can system), with the fastest pit stop going to Kurt Busch at 16.9 seconds. Brad Keselowski would win his first Clash race as a big wreck happened on the last lap where Kyle Larson turns Jimmie Johnson into the outside wall on the back straightaway collecting Kyle Busch, Chase Elliott, Kasey Kahne, and Martin Truex Jr.
- 2019: For the first time in the race's history, it was truncated due to rain. Paul Menard drew the pole and led 51 laps all through the rain-plagued race, breaking the record held by Dale Earnhardt Jr. for most laps led in the event. Rain red-flagged the race three times, first on lap 10, and a second time on lap 45. Racing was very tame as Menard led the entire 20 car field single file in the high groove. With more rain on the horizon, drivers were starting to make their moves. On lap 56 Jimmie Johnson got a run on Menard and in an attempt to get the lead by side-drafting, made contact with Menard. The ensuing contact triggered the "Big One" that involved 17 of the 20 cars in the field when Menard spun back across the track. As the field with Johnson now out in front circled the track under caution, rain began to fall once again. After being brought down pit road with 59 of the scheduled 75 laps completed and red-flagged for a third time, NASCAR called the race over, with Johnson taking home his second Clash triumph with controversy. Only eight of the 17 cars involved continued and were scored as having finished the race, resulting in only 11 of the 20 starters finishing the race. The race would ultimately be Johnson's last NASCAR-sanctioned victory.
- 2020: Three multiple-car crashes in the final ten laps and overtime was the last straw. With ten laps remaining, Joey Logano makes a block on Kyle Busch, causing a six-car incident in Turn 4. The race restarts with three laps remaining. William Byron and Ryan Newman make contact on the restart before the race is officially restarted, and a ten-car incident occurs. The race is extended to overtime. On the ensuing restart in the green-white-checkered finish, on Lap 78, another 11-car incident occurs in Turn 3, leading to a 7:27 red flag. On Lap 84, Turn 4 is the site of another crash with Chase Elliott and Kyle Larson, with Erik Jones also involved. Only six cars make the restart on Lap 87, which lets the one lapped car of Denny Hamlin, badly damaged, to push Erik Jones in the final two-lap restart.
- 2021: On March 4, 2020, NASCAR, infuriated with the five massive incidents in the past 150 laps (from 2018 to 2020), with plans for the seventh-generation cars to debut in 2021, and to alleviate an issue with nearby Super Bowl LV in nearby Tampa that is scheduled for February 7 (the date the Clash would normally run), makes three drastic changes. The Busch Clash is moved to Tuesday night of Daytona 500 week (February 9) on the road course, and intended to be run with the current sixth-generation car as the last race before the new seventh-generation car would debut at Daytona the next night during qualifying. However, two weeks after the announcement, the season is suspended ten weeks because of a lockdown. When the season restarted, development of the new car was delayed where it would not debut until the 2022 season. All original plans of date, course, and chassis were kept when the season restarted in May 2020. In December 2020, NASCAR cancelled for the 2021 season the Fontana round by extending the Daytona race meeting into having the first two rounds of all three national series races at Daytona, one on the oval and one on the road course. As only five rounds featured pole qualifying in 2020 (Daytona, Fontana, Las Vegas, Phoenix, Charlotte 1), the format added all former Daytona winners, and stage winners. The race was scheduled for 200 kilometers (35 laps), contrasting to the previous years of a 300 kilometer format (75 laps on the oval), half the distance of the ensuing Cup race on the road course two weeks later, split into 15 and 20 lap segments. At the finish, Kyle Busch won in the final quarter mile of the race when Chase Elliott and Ryan Blaney crashed in the final chicane before pit entrance.
- 2026: The race was originally scheduled to be held on February 1, 2026, but was postponed twice due to winter weather.

== Race notes ==
- Six times the winner of the Clash at Daytona has gone on to win the Daytona 500 the following weekend: Bobby Allison (1982), Bill Elliott (1987), Dale Jarrett (1996, 2000), Jeff Gordon (1997), and Denny Hamlin (2016).
- Though there have been drivers who have won all three of the NASCAR Cup Series events of Speedweeks at Daytona – the Clash at Daytona, the Duel, and the Daytona 500 – there has not yet been a driver who won all three events in the same year. Twice, an Earnhardt won two of the events, but came up short by losing to Dale Jarrett in the third: in 2004, Dale Earnhardt Jr. won his Duel race and the Daytona 500, but finished second to Jarrett in the Unlimited. In 1993, Dale Earnhardt won the Unlimited and his Duel race, but finished second to Jarrett in the Daytona 500. In 2014, Denny Hamlin joined this group, winning the Unlimited and the second Duel race, but losing to Dale Earnhardt Jr. in the 500.
- While it was still named the Busch Clash, on two occasions, the race had the year in its official title. The Busch Clash of '89 and the Busch Clash of '93 were the respective advertised titles.
- From 1979 until 2008, the drivers themselves qualified as eligible for the Budweiser Shootout, not the teams. If an eligible driver for the upcoming Shootout switches teams in the off-season, the driver, not the team, is eligible for the race. That driver competes in the race with his new team.
- Until 2008, drivers who win the pole award at a race must have had an Anheuser-Busch decal (the Busch brand from 1979 to 1997, and the Budweiser brand 1998–2007), or the corporate logo affixed to their car (for drivers under 21 years of age) at the time in order to earn the berth for the Budweiser Shootout. If the car does not carry the sticker, the Budweiser Pole Award goes to the next car eligible, but the driver which wins the Budweiser Pole Award does not earn a Shootout spot.
  - In 1998, John Andretti was eligible to race in the Bud Shootout for having won a pole position in 1997 racing for Cale Yarborough. In the off-season, Andretti switched to Petty Enterprises, which was not allowed to participate, since they chose not to affix the proper decals to their cars – it was Petty family tradition to not permit alcohol decals or sponsorship on their cars. Andretti participated in the race in a one-off ride with Hendrick Motorsports. (Ricky Craven, the regular driver for Hendrick's Budweiser-sponsored Chevrolet, did not qualify for the race; Andretti drove the Hendrick car, which carried the usual No. 25 instead of the No. 50 otherwise used by the team for NASCAR's 50-year celebration in 1998.)
  - Bobby Hamilton won the pole position for the 1997 Miller 400 racing for Petty Enterprises, but was not eligible for the 1998 Bud Shootout since the team chose not to affix the proper decal.
  - John Andretti won the pole position for the 1998 Primestar 500 racing for Petty Enterprises, but was not eligible for the 1999 Bud Shootout since the team chose not to affix the proper decal. Todd Bodine was the official winner of the Bud Pole Award by NASCAR rule, but not awarded a Budweiser Shootout position.
  - Jeff Green won the pole position for the 2003 Daytona 500 racing Richard Childress Racing's No. 30 AOL Chevrolet, but did not participate in the 2004 Budweiser Shootout. Green changed teams twice in 2003 ending up in the No. 43 Petty Enterprises Dodge (which he also signed to drive in 2004). As usual, since the team chose not to affix the proper decal the No. 43 was ineligible for the Shootout. Green could have driven for another team, but chose not to do so.
  - Aric Almirola drove the Richard Petty Motorsports No. 43, which does not have the (since 2008) Molson Coors Brewing Company-provided Pole Award sticker (Coors Light or Coors Brewing 21 Means 21), per Petty policy. With InBev withdrawing sponsorship of the Shootout, the 2013 Shootout does not have an alcohol sticker mandate, the circuit he will be in the first race of the new 2013 format.
- Drivers must carry a special decal without the alcohol brand if they are under 21 years of age, but could race in the Shootout. Drivers must be 21 or older to wear alcohol decals, and those under 21 must wear a special sticker, which during Anheuser-Busch era was a corporate logo Pole Award sticker, without any brand indication, and since Molson's Coors Light took over in 2008, a "Coors Brewing Company 21 Means 21" sticker. Special stickers are made to cover up alcohol for such drivers, which has happened four times involving two drivers:
  - On May 14, 2004, 20-year-old Brian Vickers won the pole at Richmond in the Chevy American Revolution 400.
  - On September 3, 2004, Vickers won the pole at the Pop Secret 500 at Fontana.
  - On February 26, 2005, 19-year-old Kyle Busch won his first pole at the very same race in Fontana.
  - On April 20, 2006, Busch won the pole at Avondale, Arizona at 20 years, 353 days.
- Except during 2013 to 2019 (and again in 2025), drivers under 21 were not permitted to participate in formal activities relating to the race, such as the draw for position and other activities such as conferences related to the race because of the alcohol sponsorship. In those cases, the crew chief will participate in such activities. The suspension of the alcohol sponsorship between the time period eliminated the rule.
  - In the 2005 Shootout (Vickers under age), Lance McGrew, who was the new crew chief for Vickers that season, participated in the Shootout draw.
  - In the 2006 Shootout (Busch under age), Alan Gustafson participated in the Shootout draw.
  - In the 2009 Shootout (Joey Logano under age), Greg Zipadelli participated in the Shootout draw.
- Dale Jarrett (2000) and Tony Stewart (2002, 2007) are the only drivers to win the Budweiser Shootout without having won a pole position the previous year. Jarrett advanced to the Shootout by winning the Bud Shootout Qualifier, and Stewart was eligible for the Shootout via the 2001 rule change adding a lifetime exemption for former winners.
- 2006 Shootout winner Denny Hamlin was the first rookie to win the event. He had won the pole at Phoenix in a seven-race tryout for Joe Gibbs Racing to find a driver for the FedEx No. 11 car late in the 2005 NASCAR Nextel Cup Series season. A driver can make up to five (until 2000) or seven (since 2001) starts in a season, or run portions of a season and not be declared in that series (since 2011), without giving up their eligibility to be a rookie in that series.

== Past winners ==
Year	Date	No.	Driver	Team	Manufacturer	Race Distance		Race Time	Average Speed (mph)	Report	Ref
Year	Date	No.	Driver	Team	Manufacturer	Laps	Miles (km)	Race Time	Average Speed (mph)	Report	Ref
Daytona International Speedway Oval, 2.5 miles (4.0 km)
1979	February 11	28	Buddy Baker	Ranier-Lundy	Oldsmobile	20	50 (80.467)	0:15:26	194.384	Report	
1980	February 10	2	Dale Earnhardt	Osterlund Racing	Oldsmobile	20	50 (80.467)	0:15:39	191.693	Report	
1981	February 8	11	Darrell Waltrip	Junior Johnson & Associates	Buick	20	50 (80.467)	0:15:52	189.076	Report	
1982	February 7	88	Bobby Allison	DiGard Motorsports	Buick	20	50 (80.467)	0:15:39	191.693	Report	
1983	February 14*	75	Neil Bonnett	RahMoc Enterprises	Chevrolet	20	50 (80.467)	0:15:35	192.513	Report	
1984	February 12	12	Neil Bonnett	Junior Johnson & Associates	Chevrolet	20	50 (80.467)	0:15:33	195.926	Report	
1985	February 10	44	Terry Labonte	Hagan Racing	Chevrolet	20	50 (80.467)	0:15:19	195.865	Report	
1986	February 9	3	Dale Earnhardt	Richard Childress Racing	Chevrolet	20	50 (80.467)	0:15:19	195.865	Report	
1987	February 8	9	Bill Elliott	Melling Racing	Ford	20	50 (80.467)	0:15:10	197.802	Report	
1988	February 7	3	Dale Earnhardt	Richard Childress Racing	Chevrolet	20	50 (80.467)	0:15:40	191.489	Report	
1989	February 12	25	Ken Schrader	Hendrick Motorsports	Chevrolet	20	50 (80.467)	0:15:33	192.926	Report	
1990	February 11	25	Ken Schrader	Hendrick Motorsports	Chevrolet	20	50 (80.467)	0:15:36	192.308	Report	
1991*	February 10	3	Dale Earnhardt	Richard Childress Racing	Chevrolet	20	50 (80.467)	0:15:50	189.474	Report	
1992*	February 8	15	Geoff Bodine	Bud Moore Engineering	Ford	20	50 (80.467)	0:15:52	189.076	Report	
1993*	February 7	3	Dale Earnhardt	Richard Childress Racing	Chevrolet	20	50 (80.467)	0:16:03	186.916	Report	
1994*	February 13	24	Jeff Gordon	Hendrick Motorsports	Chevrolet	20	50 (80.467)	0:15:53	188.877	Report	
1995*	February 12	3	Dale Earnhardt	Richard Childress Racing	Chevrolet	20	50 (80.467)	0:15:55	188.482	Report	
1996*	February 11	88	Dale Jarrett	Robert Yates Racing	Ford	20	50 (80.467)	0:16:13	184.995	Report	
1997*	February 9	24	Jeff Gordon	Hendrick Motorsports	Chevrolet	20	50 (80.467)	0:16:11	185.376	Report	
1998	February 8	2	Rusty Wallace	Penske Racing	Ford	25	62.5 (100.584)	0:20:57	178.998	Report	
1999	February 7	6	Mark Martin	Roush Racing	Ford	25	62.5 (100.584)	0:20:38	181.745	Report	
2000	February 13	88	Dale Jarrett	Robert Yates Racing	Ford	25	62.5 (100.584)	0:20:34	182.334	Report	
2001	February 11	20	Tony Stewart	Joe Gibbs Racing	Pontiac	70	175 (281.635)	0:58:00	181.036	Report	
2002	February 10	20	Tony Stewart	Joe Gibbs Racing	Pontiac	70	175 (281.635)	0:57:55	181.295	Report	
2003	February 8	8	Dale Earnhardt Jr.	Dale Earnhardt, Inc.	Chevrolet	70	175 (281.635)	0:58:04	180.827	Report	
2004	February 7	88	Dale Jarrett	Robert Yates Racing	Ford	70	175 (281.635)	1:09:37	150.826	Report	
2005	February 12	48	Jimmie Johnson	Hendrick Motorsports	Chevrolet	70	175 (281.635)	0:57:53	181.399	Report	
2006	February 12*	11	Denny Hamlin	Joe Gibbs Racing	Chevrolet	72*	180 (289.681)	1:10:18	153.627	Report	
2007	February 10	20	Tony Stewart	Joe Gibbs Racing	Chevrolet	70	175 (281.635)	1:03:12	166.195	Report	
2008	February 9	88	Dale Earnhardt Jr.	Hendrick Motorsports	Chevrolet	70	175 (281.635)	1:14:36	140.751	Report	
2009	February 7	29	Kevin Harvick	Richard Childress Racing	Chevrolet	78*	195 (313.822)	1:31:57	127.243	Report	
2010	February 6	29	Kevin Harvick	Richard Childress Racing	Chevrolet	76*	190 (305.775)	1:18:48	144.742	Report	
2011	February 12	22	Kurt Busch	Penske Racing	Dodge	75	187.5 (301.752)	1:13:15	153.584	Report	
2012	February 18	18	Kyle Busch	Joe Gibbs Racing	Toyota	82*	205 (329.915)	1:39:07	124.096	Report	
2013	February 16	29	Kevin Harvick	Richard Childress Racing	Chevrolet	75	187.5 (301.752)	1:03:22	177.538	Report	
2014	February 15	11	Denny Hamlin	Joe Gibbs Racing	Toyota	75	187.5 (301.752)	1:18:35	143.16	Report	
2015	February 14	20	Matt Kenseth	Joe Gibbs Racing	Toyota	75	187.5 (301.752)	1:22:59	135.569	Report	
2016	February 13	11	Denny Hamlin	Joe Gibbs Racing	Toyota	79*	197.5 (317.845)	1:32:16	128.432	Report	
2017	February 19*	22	Joey Logano	Team Penske	Ford	75	187.5 (301.752)	1:18:13	143.831	Report	
2018	February 11	2	Brad Keselowski	Team Penske	Ford	75	187.5 (301.752)	1:06:19	169.641	Report	
2019	February 10	48	Jimmie Johnson	Hendrick Motorsports	Chevrolet	59*	147.5 (236)	1:20:01	110.602	Report	
2020	February 9	20	Erik Jones	Joe Gibbs Racing	Toyota	88*	220 (354.055)	1:37:51	134.9	Report	
Daytona International Speedway Road Course, 3.61 miles (5.81 km)
2021	February 9	18	Kyle Busch	Joe Gibbs Racing	Toyota	35	126.35 (203.341)	1:30:25	83.845	Report	
Los Angeles Memorial Coliseum Oval, 0.25 miles (0.40 km)
2022	February 6	22	Joey Logano	Team Penske	Ford	150	37.5 (60.35)	0:57:39	39.029	Report	
2023	February 5	19	Martin Truex Jr.	Joe Gibbs Racing	Toyota	150	37.5 (60.35)	1:43:04	21.831	Report	
2024	February 3*	11	Denny Hamlin	Joe Gibbs Racing	Toyota	151*	37.75 (60.752)	1:08:46	32.937	Report	
Bowman Gray Stadium Oval, 0.253 miles (0.407 km)
2025	February 2	9	Chase Elliott	Hendrick Motorsports	Chevrolet	200	50.6 (81.4)	1:13:15	40.956	Report	
2026	February 4*	60	Ryan Preece	RFK Racing	Ford	200	50.6 (81.4)	2:20:15	21.390	Report	
Daytona International Speedway Oval, 2.5 miles (4.0 km)

=== Notes ===
- 1979–2000, 2023–present: Green flag laps only counted. Laps run under caution situations do not count.
- 1983: Race postponed from Sunday to Monday due to rain.
- 2006 and 2017: Race postponed from Saturday night to Sunday afternoon due to rain.
- 2006, 2009, 2010, 2012, 2016, 2020, and 2024: Race extended due to a NASCAR overtime.
- 2019: Race shortened due to rain.
- 2024: Race moved from Sunday night to Saturday night due to rain.
- 2026: Race was moved from Sunday night to Wednesday night due to snow.

=== Segment winners ===
- 1991: Earnhardt won first 10-lap segment, and second 10-lap segment
- 1992: Sterling Marlin won first 10-lap segment, and Bodine won second 10-lap segment
- 1993: Earnhardt won first 10-lap segment, and second 10-lap segment
- 1994: Dale Earnhardt won first 10-lap segment, and Gordon won second 10-lap segment
- 1995: Jeff Gordon won first 10-lap segment, and Earnhardt won second 10-lap segment
- 1996: Sterling Marlin won first 10-lap segment, and Jarrett won second 10-lap segment
- 1997: Terry Labonte won first 10-lap segment, and Gordon won second 10-lap segment

=== Bud Shootout Qualifier ===
Year	Date	Driver	Team	Manufacturer	Race Distance		Race Time	Average Speed (mph)	Ref
Year	Date	Driver	Team	Manufacturer	Laps	Miles (km)	Race Time	Average Speed (mph)	Ref
1998	February 8	Jimmy Spencer	Travis Carter Enterprises	Ford	25	62.5 (100.584)	0:20:50	180	
1999	February 7	Mike Skinner	Richard Childress Racing	Chevrolet	25	62.5 (100.584)	0:20:56	179.14	
2000	February 13	Dale Jarrett	Robert Yates Racing	Ford	25	62.5 (100.584)	0:20:43	181.014	

=== Multiple winners (drivers) ===
# Wins	Driver	Years won
6	Dale Earnhardt	1980, 1986, 1988, 1991, 1993, 1995
4	Denny Hamlin	2006, 2014, 2016, 2024
3	Dale Jarrett	1996, 2000, 2004
3	Tony Stewart	2001, 2002, 2007
3	Kevin Harvick	2009, 2010, 2013
2	Neil Bonnett	1983, 1984
2	Ken Schrader	1989, 1990
2	Jeff Gordon	1994, 1997
2	Dale Earnhardt Jr.	2003, 2008
2	Jimmie Johnson	2005, 2019
2	Kyle Busch	2012, 2021
2	Joey Logano	2017, 2022

=== Multiple winners (teams) ===
# Wins	Team	Years won
12	Joe Gibbs Racing	2001, 2002, 2006, 2007, 2012, 2014-2016, 2020, 2021, 2023, 2024
8	Richard Childress Racing	1986, 1988, 1991, 1993, 1995, 2009, 2010, 2013
8	Hendrick Motorsports	1989, 1990, 1994, 1997, 2005, 2008, 2019, 2025
5	Team Penske	1998, 2011, 2017, 2018, 2022
3	Robert Yates Racing	1996, 2000, 2004
2	Junior Johnson & Associates	1981, 1984
2	RFK Racing	1999, 2026

=== Multiple winners (manufacturers) ===
# Wins	Manufacturer	Years won
22	Chevrolet	1983-1986, 1988-1991, 1993-1995, 1997, 2003, 2005-2010, 2013, 2019, 2025
11	Ford	1987, 1992, 1996, 1998-2000, 2004, 2017, 2018, 2022, 2026
8	Toyota	2012, 2014-2016, 2020, 2021, 2023, 2024
2	Oldsmobile	1979, 1980
2	Buick	1981, 1982
2	Pontiac	2001, 2002
