= 2007 Budweiser Shootout =

Stock car race in Daytona Beach, Florida

Race details
- Race 1 of 2 non-championship races in the 2007 NASCAR Nextel Cup Series
- Layout of Daytona International Speedway
- Date: February 10, 2007
- Location: Daytona International Speedway, Daytona Beach, Florida, United States
- Course: Permanent racing facility
- Course length: 2.500 miles (4.023 km)
- Distance: 70 laps, 175.000 mi (281.635 km)
- Weather: Temperatures up to 69.1 °F (20.6 °C); wind speeds at around 4.83 mph (7.77 km/h)
- Average speed: 166.195 mph (267.465 km/h)

Pole position
Driver	Dale Jarrett	Michael Waltrip Racing
- Time: N/A

Most laps led
Driver	Kyle Busch	Hendrick Motorsports
- Laps: 39

Winner
No. 20	Tony Stewart	Joe Gibbs Racing

Television in the United States
- Network: Fox
- Announcers: Mike Joy, Darrell Waltrip, Larry McReynolds
- Nielsen ratings: 4.2/7 (Overnight)

The 2007 Budweiser Shootout was a NASCAR Nextel Cup Series stock car race that was held on February 10, 2007 at Daytona International Speedway in Daytona Beach, Florida. It was the first non-championship race of the 2007 NASCAR Nextel Cup Series season and the 29th running of the event. Tony Stewart of Joe Gibbs Racing won the 70-lap race; Robert Yates Racing driver David Gilliland finished second and Kurt Busch came in third for Penske Racing.

== Background ==
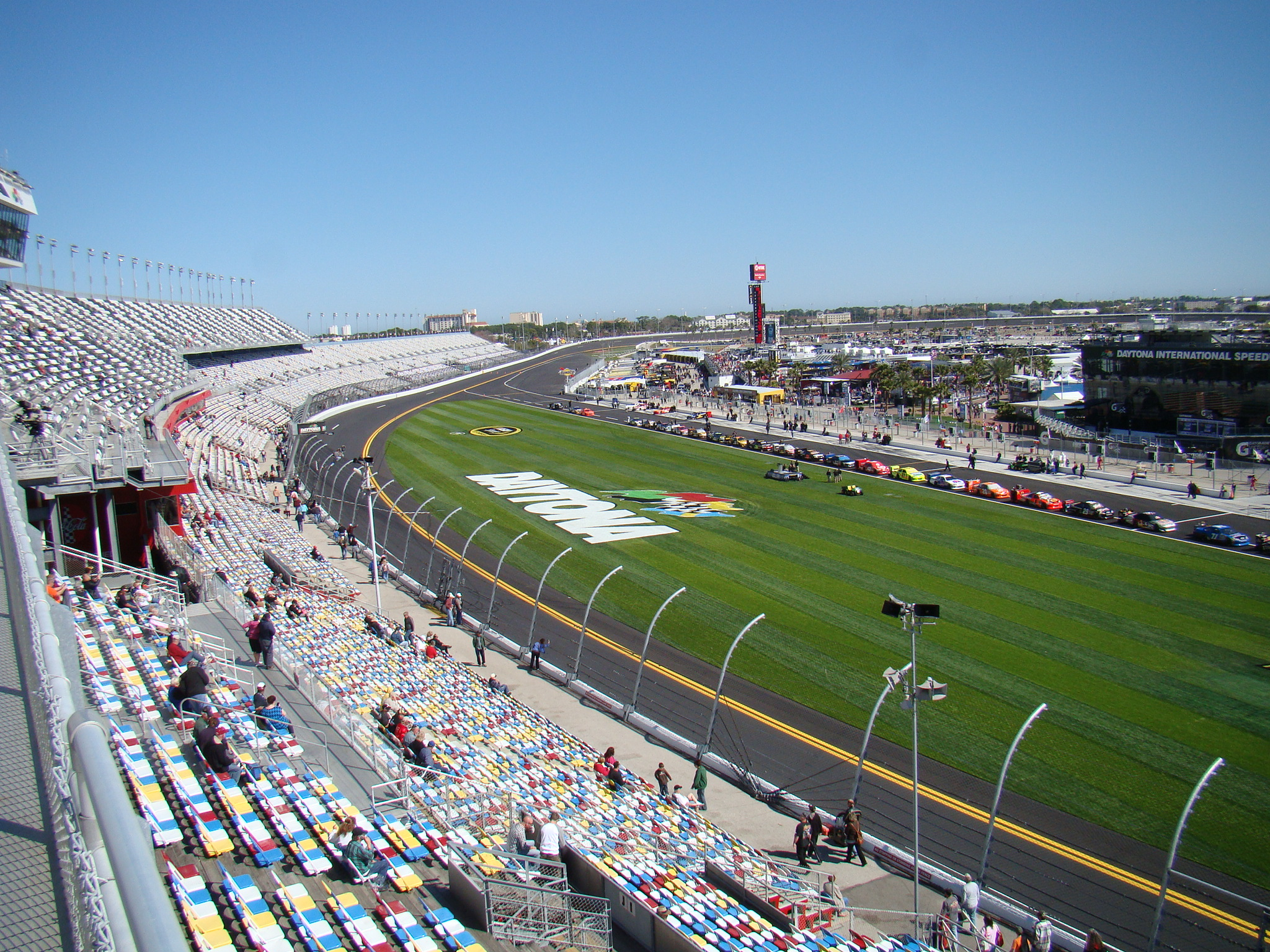
Daytona International Speedway (pictured in 2011), where the race was held.

The 2007 Budweiser Shootout was the first of two non-championship events for the 2007 NASCAR Nextel Cup Series season and the 29th annual edition of the event. It was held on February 10, 2007 at the 2.5 mi (4.0 km) superspeedway, Daytona International Speedway, in Daytona Beach, Florida, United States. The track features four corners which are banked as high as 31 degrees, while the front stretch has 18-degree banking.

The Budweiser Shootout was conceived by Busch Beer brand manager Monty Roberts, who wanted to promote the beer brand with a race between the fastest Cup Series drivers of the previous season. It was first held in 1979 as the Busch Clash. Budweiser became the title sponsor of the event in 1998; it was resultantly named the Bud Shootout before being retitled to the Budweiser Shootout in 2001. The race is considered a warm-up for the season-opening Daytona 500.

A total of 21 drivers were eligible to compete in the race, including the pole sitters of the 2006 season and past winners of the race who finished within the top 50 positions of the Drivers' Championship standings in 2006. (Note: Matt Kenseth started first in the 2006 Bass Pro Shops MBNA 500, but he was deemed ineligible to partake in the race because qualifications were rained out and the starting positions were set by the Owners' Championship standings.) Two of the participants, Dale Jarrett and Brian Vickers, drove for Toyota, marking the manufacturer's debut in the Cup Series. Denny Hamlin was the defending winner. The race had a scheduled distance of 70 laps, which were split into two segments of 20 and 50 laps with a ten-minute pit stop in between. Each driver was required to make at least one pit stop and change at least two tires during green-flag conditions. The race was also guaranteed to end under the green flag, and caution flag laps were counted.

== Practice and qualifying ==
The starting order for the Saturday race was determined on Thursday by drawing lots, a feature which is unique to the event. Jarrett drew the pole position, ahead of Scott Riggs, Boris Said, Vickers, and Greg Biffle, with Kyle Busch, Ken Schrader, Jimmie Johnson, Ryan Newman, and Mark Martin rounding out the top-five. The remaining starting positions were occupied by Jeff Gordon, Jeff Burton, David Gilliland, Tony Stewart, Kasey Kahne, Bill Elliott, Dale Earnhardt Jr., Elliott Sadler, Kurt Busch, Kevin Harvick, and Hamlin. After the draw concluded, Jarrett expressed anticipation for the race: "I'll be glad to finally get into those race conditions to see where we stack up and see how we can compete. How much work do we have to do? Or how little do we have to do?"

Two practice sessions on Friday preceded the race, with the first lasting for 45 minutes and the second 60 minutes. Hamlin was quickest in the Friday afternoon session with a time of 47.432 seconds, beating second-place Johnson by a hundredth of a second. Kahne, Biffle, and Harvick rounded out the top-five. Kahne's lap of 47.532 seconds made him the quickest driver of the final practice session on Friday evening, with Kurt Busch trailing by almost two hundredths of a second. Earnhardt Jr. was third-quickest, Kyle Busch fourth, and Riggs fifth. Johnson's tire was loosened as he entered pit road, but he avoided damaging his car.

=== Qualifying results ===
Grid	No.	Driver	Team	Manufacturer
1	44	Dale Jarrett	Michael Waltrip Racing	Toyota
2	10	Scott Riggs	Gillett Evernham Motorsports	Dodge
3	60	Boris Said	No Fear Racing	Ford
4	83	Brian Vickers	Red Bull Racing Team	Toyota
5	16	Greg Biffle	Roush Fenway Racing	Ford
6	5	Kyle Busch	Hendrick Motorsports	Chevrolet
7	21	Ken Schrader	Wood Brothers Racing	Ford
8	48	Jimmie Johnson	Hendrick Motorsports	Chevrolet
9	12	Ryan Newman	Penske Racing	Dodge
10	01	Mark Martin	Ginn Racing	Chevrolet
11	24	Jeff Gordon	Hendrick Motorsports	Chevrolet
12	31	Jeff Burton	Richard Childress Racing	Chevrolet
13	38	David Gilliland	Robert Yates Racing	Ford
14	20	Tony Stewart	Joe Gibbs Racing	Chevrolet
15	9	Kasey Kahne	Gillett Evernham Motorsports	Dodge
16	37	Bill Elliott	Front Row Motorsports	Dodge
17	8	Dale Earnhardt Jr.	Dale Earnhardt, Inc.	Chevrolet
18	19	Elliott Sadler	Gillett Evernham Motorsports	Dodge
19	2	Kurt Busch	Penske Racing	Dodge
20	29	Kevin Harvick	Richard Childress Racing	Chevrolet
21	11	Denny Hamlin	Joe Gibbs Racing	Chevrolet

== Race ==
Live television coverage of the race in the United States was aired on Fox and began at 8:00 PM Eastern Standard Time (UTC−05:00). Commentary was provided by Mike Joy, Darrell Waltrip, and Larry McReynolds. Pre-race ceremonies began with an invocation by Reverend John Long III. The national anthem was performed by Cowboy Crush and Dierks Bentley commanded the drivers to start their engines.

The green flag was waved at 8:38 PM to start the race. Riggs pulled ahead of Jarrett to lead the first lap. After Riggs drove to the inside line, Vickers overtook him in the first turn on lap two. Vickers maintained the lead until Kyle Busch drove up the track to take the lead in the second turn. By the sixth lap, Vickers fell outside the top-ten, while Jarrett dropped to 21st. The following lap, Harvick received a push from Earnhardt Jr. on the back stretch to take the lead from Busch. As Burton and Kurt Busch raced alongside each other for third place, Stewart got by Harvick in turn one for the lead on lap 12. Stewart slightly oversteered the next lap in turn two, but kept the lead. Harvick then reclaimed the lead on the 15th lap, as Schrader drove up to the fifth position.

The ten-minute break commenced on lap 21 to allow teams to make adjustments on pit road. Johnson's team alleviated an issue in the throttle assembly underneath his hood after he complained of being unable to race full bore. After the break, nine drivers drove to their pit stalls to fill their fuel tanks.

=== Race results ===
Pos.	Grid	No.	Driver	Team	Manufacturer	Laps
1	14	20	Tony Stewart	Joe Gibbs Racing	Chevrolet	70
2	13	38	David Gilliland	Robert Yates Racing	Ford	70
3	19	2	Kurt Busch	Penske Racing	Dodge	70
4	8	48	Jimmie Johnson	Hendrick Motorsports	Chevrolet	70
5	20	29	Kevin Harvick	Richard Childress Racing	Chevrolet	70
6	10	01	Mark Martin	Ginn Racing	Chevrolet	70
7	6	5	Kyle Busch	Hendrick Motorsports	Chevrolet	70
8	4	83	Brian Vickers	Red Bull Racing Team	Toyota	70
9	12	31	Jeff Burton	Richard Childress Racing	Chevrolet	70
10	2	10	Scott Riggs	Gillett Evernham Motorsports	Dodge	70
11	7	21	Ken Schrader	Wood Brothers Racing	Ford	70
12	3	60	Boris Said	No Fear Racing	Ford	70
13	5	16	Greg Biffle	Roush Fenway Racing	Ford	70
14	17	8	Dale Earnhardt Jr.	Dale Earnhardt, Inc.	Chevrolet	70
15	15	9	Kasey Kahne	Gillett Evernham Motorsports	Dodge	70
16	18	19	Elliott Sadler	Gillett Evernham Motorsports	Dodge	70
17	21	11	Denny Hamlin	Joe Gibbs Racing	Chevrolet	70
18	1	44	Dale Jarrett	Michael Waltrip Racing	Toyota	70
19	16	37	Bill Elliott	Front Row Motorsports	Dodge	70
20	9	12	Ryan Newman	Penske Racing	Dodge	46
21	11	24	Jeff Gordon	Hendrick Motorsports	Chevrolet	31
