= 2022 Busch Light Clash at The Coliseum =

Non-points exhibition NASCAR race

Race details
- Race 1 of 2 exhibition races in the 2022 NASCAR Cup Series
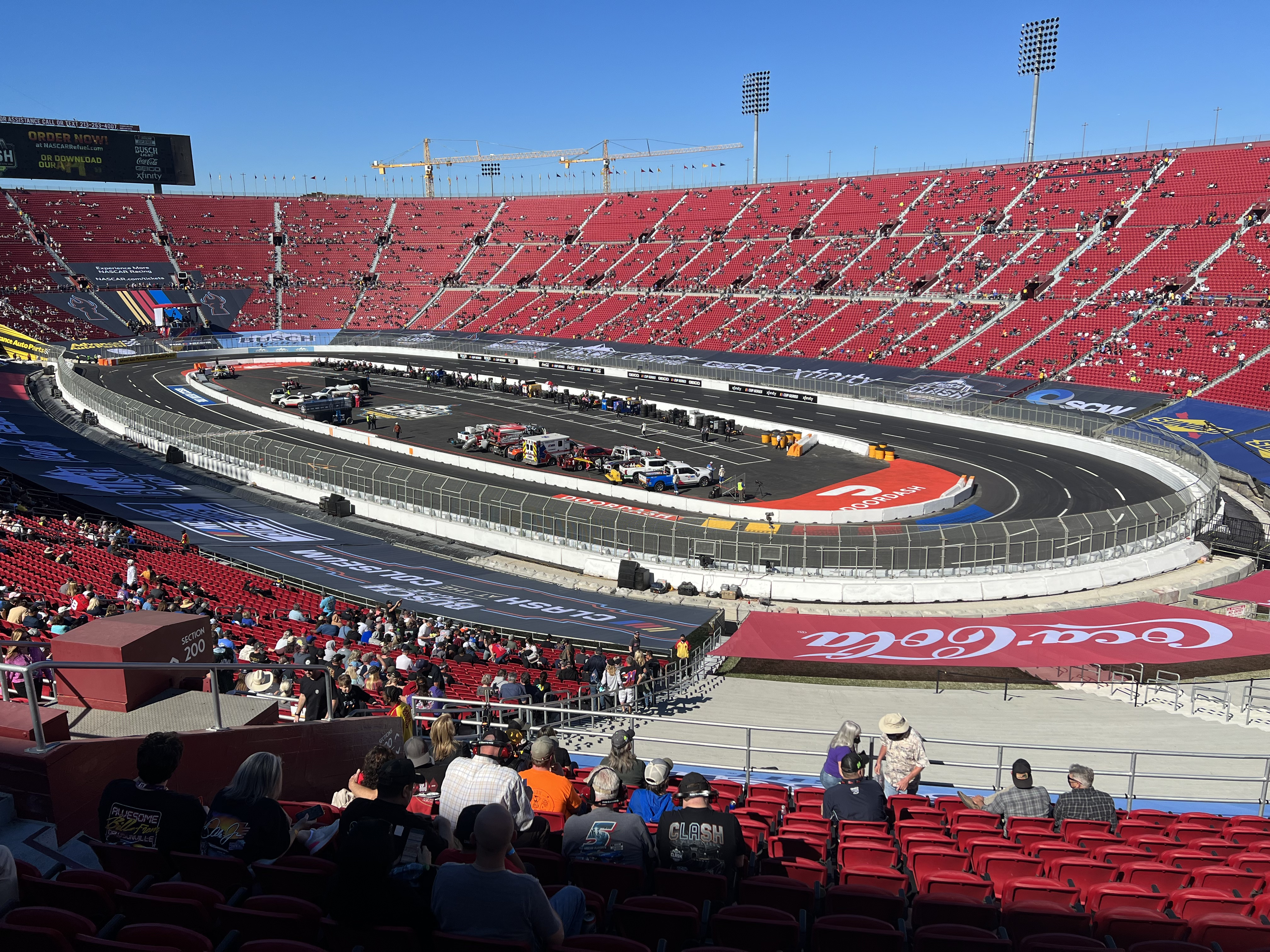
- Date: February 6, 2022
- Location: Los Angeles Memorial Coliseum in Los Angeles, California
- Course: Permanent racing facility
- Course length: 0.25 miles (0.40 km)
- Distance: 150 laps, 37.5 mi (60 km)
- Average speed: 29.029 miles per hour (46.718 km/h)

Pole position
Driver	Kyle Busch	Joe Gibbs Racing

Most laps led
Driver	Kyle Busch	Joe Gibbs Racing
- Laps: 65

Winner
No. 22	Joey Logano	Team Penske

Television in the United States
- Network: Fox
- Announcers: Mike Joy, Clint Bowyer, and Tony Stewart
- Nielsen ratings: 2.3, 4.238 Million Viewers

Radio in the United States
- Radio: MRN
- Booth announcers: Alex Hayden, Jeff Striegle, and Rusty Wallace
- Turn announcers: Dan Hubbard (Backstretch)

The 2022 Busch Light Clash at The Coliseum was a NASCAR Cup Series race that was held on February 6, 2022, at Los Angeles Memorial Coliseum in Los Angeles, California. Contested over 150 laps, it was the first exhibition race of the 2022 NASCAR Cup Series season.

== Format and eligibility ==
The 2022 Busch Light Clash at The Coliseum program cover.

On September 14, 2021, NASCAR announced that the Busch Clash would move to the Los Angeles Memorial Coliseum. On November 9, 2021, the format for the 2022 Clash was announced:

- The event is open for all teams and drivers for the first time in its history.
- A total of 350 laps in six races.
- The 36 charter teams and up to four open teams will participate in qualifying. Should more than 40 teams enter the race, it is unknown if qualifying will determine who advances to heat races.
- Based on lap times, cars are put in one of four heat races of 25 laps each. The top four drivers in each heat advance to the feature.
- All non qualifying drivers are assigned to one of two 50 lap heat races. The top three drivers in each heat advance to the feature.
- The highest driver in 2021 Cup Series points standings not in will also advance to the feature in the last position.
- The feature is 150 laps and will have 23 cars start the race.

=== Entry list ===
- (R) denotes rookie driver.
- (i) denotes driver who are ineligible for series driver points.

No.	Driver	Team	Manufacturer
1	Ross Chastain	Trackhouse Racing Team	Chevrolet
2	Austin Cindric (R)	Team Penske	Ford
3	Austin Dillon	Richard Childress Racing	Chevrolet
4	Kevin Harvick	Stewart-Haas Racing	Ford
5	Kyle Larson	Hendrick Motorsports	Chevrolet
6	Brad Keselowski	RFK Racing	Ford
7	Corey LaJoie	Spire Motorsports	Chevrolet
8	Tyler Reddick	Richard Childress Racing	Chevrolet
9	Chase Elliott	Hendrick Motorsports	Chevrolet
10	Aric Almirola	Stewart-Haas Racing	Ford
11	Denny Hamlin	Joe Gibbs Racing	Toyota
12	Ryan Blaney	Team Penske	Ford
14	Chase Briscoe	Stewart-Haas Racing	Ford
15	Ryan Preece	Rick Ware Racing	Ford
16	A. J. Allmendinger (i)	Kaulig Racing	Chevrolet
17	Chris Buescher	RFK Racing	Ford
18	Kyle Busch	Joe Gibbs Racing	Toyota
19	Martin Truex Jr.	Joe Gibbs Racing	Toyota
20	Christopher Bell	Joe Gibbs Racing	Toyota
21	Harrison Burton (R)	Wood Brothers Racing	Ford
22	Joey Logano	Team Penske	Ford
23	Bubba Wallace	23XI Racing	Toyota
24	William Byron	Hendrick Motorsports	Chevrolet
31	Justin Haley	Kaulig Racing	Chevrolet
34	Michael McDowell	Front Row Motorsports	Ford
38	Todd Gilliland (R)	Front Row Motorsports	Ford
41	Cole Custer	Stewart-Haas Racing	Ford
42	Ty Dillon	Petty GMS Motorsports	Chevrolet
43	Erik Jones	Petty GMS Motorsports	Chevrolet
45	Kurt Busch	23XI Racing	Toyota
47	Ricky Stenhouse Jr.	JTG Daugherty Racing	Chevrolet
48	Alex Bowman	Hendrick Motorsports	Chevrolet
51	Cody Ware	Rick Ware Racing	Ford
77	Landon Cassill (i)	Spire Motorsports	Chevrolet
78	B. J. McLeod	Live Fast Motorsports	Ford
99	Daniel Suárez	Trackhouse Racing Team	Chevrolet
Official entry list

== Practice ==
Chase Elliott was the fastest in the practice session with a time of 13.455 with an average speed of 66.890 mph (107.649 km/h) .

=== Practice results ===
Pos	No.	Driver	Team	Manufacturer	Time	Speed
1	9	Chase Elliott	Hendrick Motorsports	Chevrolet	13.455	66.890
2	4	Kevin Harvick	Stewart-Haas Racing	Ford	13.457	66.880
3	14	Chase Briscoe	Stewart-Haas Racing	Ford	13.470	66.815
Official practice results

== Qualifying ==
Kyle Busch scored the pole for the first heat race with a time of 13.745 and a speed of 65.478 mph (105.377 km/h).

=== Qualifying results ===
Pos	No.	Driver	Team	Manufacturer	Time
1	18	Kyle Busch	Joe Gibbs Racing	Toyota	13.745
2	8	Tyler Reddick	Richard Childress Racing	Chevrolet	13.761
3	31	Justin Haley	Kaulig Racing	Chevrolet	13.891
4	22	Joey Logano	Team Penske	Ford	13.949
5	99	Daniel Suárez	Trackhouse Racing Team	Chevrolet	13.952
6	41	Cole Custer	Stewart-Haas Racing	Ford	13.953
7	9	Chase Elliott	Hendrick Motorsports	Chevrolet	13.954
8	5	Kyle Larson	Hendrick Motorsports	Chevrolet	13.957
9	47	Ricky Stenhouse Jr.	JTG Daugherty Racing	Chevrolet	13.962
10	21	Harrison Burton (R)	Wood Brothers Racing	Ford	13.965
11	24	William Byron	Hendrick Motorsports	Chevrolet	13.973
12	34	Michael McDowell	Front Row Motorsports	Ford	13.978
13	12	Ryan Blaney	Team Penske	Ford	14.007
14	48	Alex Bowman	Hendrick Motorsports	Chevrolet	14.014
15	20	Christopher Bell	Joe Gibbs Racing	Toyota	14.023
16	77	Landon Cassill (i)	Spire Motorsports	Chevrolet	14.050
17	11	Denny Hamlin	Joe Gibbs Racing	Toyota	14.053
18	23	Bubba Wallace	23XI Racing	Toyota	14.076
19	16	A. J. Allmendinger (i)	Kaulig Racing	Chevrolet	14.120
20	2	Austin Cindric (R)	Team Penske	Ford	14.148
21	10	Aric Almirola	Stewart-Haas Racing	Ford	14.151
22	3	Austin Dillon	Richard Childress Racing	Chevrolet	14.157
23	4	Kevin Harvick	Stewart-Haas Racing	Ford	14.158
24	43	Erik Jones	Petty GMS Motorsports	Chevrolet	14.194
25	78	B. J. McLeod	Live Fast Motorsports	Ford	14.235
26	14	Chase Briscoe	Stewart-Haas Racing	Ford	14.247
27	17	Chris Buescher	RFK Racing	Ford	14.251
28	15	Ryan Preece	Rick Ware Racing	Ford	14.277
29	38	Todd Gilliland (R)	Front Row Motorsports	Ford	14.304
30	6	Brad Keselowski	RFK Racing	Ford	14.305
31	7	Corey LaJoie	Spire Motorsports	Chevrolet	14.326
32	45	Kurt Busch	23XI Racing	Toyota	14.437
33	1	Ross Chastain	Trackhouse Racing Team	Chevrolet	14.451
34	19	Martin Truex Jr.	Joe Gibbs Racing	Toyota	14.466
35	51	Cody Ware	Rick Ware Racing	Ford	14.471
36	42	Ty Dillon	Petty GMS Motorsports	Chevrolet	14.532
Official qualifying results

== Qualifying heat races ==
Kyle Busch scored the pole for the race after winning the first qualifying heat race. Ty Dillon finished first in the second B Main (cars in the B Main were split into one of two B Mains), however was disqualified for a restart violation, allowing Harrison Burton to qualify for the feature.

=== Race 1 ===
Pos	Grid	No	Driver	Team	Manufacturer	Laps
1	1	18	Kyle Busch	Joe Gibbs Racing	Toyota	25
2	2	99	Daniel Suárez	Trackhouse Racing Team	Chevrolet	25
3	3	47	Ricky Stenhouse Jr.	JTG Daugherty Racing	Chevrolet	25
4	4	12	Ryan Blaney	Team Penske	Ford	25
5	5	11	Denny Hamlin	Joe Gibbs Racing	Toyota	25
6	9	1	Ross Chastain	Trackhouse Racing Team	Chevrolet	25
7	8	38	Todd Gilliland (R)	Front Row Motorsports	Ford	25
8	6	10	Aric Almirola	Stewart-Haas Racing	Ford	25
9	7	78	B. J. McLeod	Live Fast Motorsports	Ford	23
Official heat race 1 results

=== Race 2 ===
Pos	Grid	No	Driver	Team	Manufacturer	Laps
1	1	8	Tyler Reddick	Richard Childress Racing	Chevrolet	25
2	7	14	Chase Briscoe	Stewart-Haas Racing	Ford	25
3	6	3	Austin Dillon	Richard Childress Racing	Chevrolet	25
4	2	41	Cole Custer	Stewart-Haas Racing	Ford	25
5	5	23	Bubba Wallace	23XI Racing	Toyota	25
6	4	48	Alex Bowman	Hendrick Motorsports	Chevrolet	25
7	9	19	Martin Truex Jr.	Joe Gibbs Racing	Toyota	25
8	3	21	Harrison Burton (R)	Wood Brothers Racing	Ford	25
9	8	6	Brad Keselowski	RFK Racing	Ford	25
Official heat race 2 results

=== Race 3 ===
Pos	Grid	No	Driver	Team	Manufacturer	Laps
1	1	31	Justin Haley	Kaulig Racing	Chevrolet	25
2	3	24	William Byron	Hendrick Motorsports	Chevrolet	25
3	4	20	Christopher Bell	Joe Gibbs Racing	Toyota	25
4	2	9	Chase Elliott	Hendrick Motorsports	Chevrolet	25
5	5	16	A. J. Allmendinger (i)	Kaulig Racing	Chevrolet	25
6	6	4	Kevin Harvick	Stewart-Haas Racing	Ford	25
7	7	17	Chris Buescher	RFK Racing	Ford	25
8	9	51	Cody Ware	Rick Ware Racing	Ford	25
9	8	7	Corey LaJoie	Spire Motorsports	Chevrolet	25
Official heat race 3 results

=== Race 4 ===
Pos	Grid	No	Driver	Team	Manufacturer	Laps
1	1	22	Joey Logano	Team Penske	Ford	25
2	2	5	Kyle Larson	Hendrick Motorsports	Chevrolet	25
3	3	34	Michael McDowell	Front Row Motorsports	Ford	25
4	6	43	Erik Jones	Petty GMS Motorsports	Chevrolet	25
5	7	15	Ryan Preece	Rick Ware Racing	Ford	25
6	5	2	Austin Cindric (R)	Team Penske	Ford	25
7	7	45	Kurt Busch	23XI Racing	Toyota	25
8	4	77	Landon Cassill (i)	Spire Motorsports	Chevrolet	25
9	9	42	Ty Dillon	Petty GMS Motorsports	Chevrolet	6
Official heat race 4 results

=== Last Chance Qualifier 1 ===
Pos	Grid	No	Driver	Team	Manufacturer	Laps
1	1	11	Denny Hamlin	Joe Gibbs Racing	Toyota	50
2	4	4	Kevin Harvick	Stewart-Haas Racing	Ford	50
3	2	16	A. J. Allmendinger (i)	Kaulig Racing	Chevrolet	50
4	8	51	Cody Ware	Rick Ware Racing	Ford	50
5	6	17	Chris Buescher	RFK Racing	Ford	50
6	3	1	Ross Chastain	Trackhouse Racing Team	Chevrolet	50
7	10	7	Corey LaJoie	Spire Motorsports	Chevrolet	50
8	5	38	Todd Gilliland (R)	Front Row Motorsports	Ford	50
9	7	10	Aric Almirola	Stewart-Haas Racing	Ford	4
10	9	78	B. J. McLeod	Live Fast Motorsports	Ford	4
Official last chance race 1 results

=== Last Chance Qualifier 2 ===
Pos	Grid	No	Driver	Team	Manufacturer	Laps
1	4	15	Ryan Preece	Rick Ware Racing	Ford	50
2	1	23	Bubba Wallace	23XI Racing	Toyota	50
3	7	21	Harrison Burton (R)	Wood Brothers Racing	Ford	50
4	9	6	Brad Keselowski	RFK Racing	Ford	50
5	2	2	Austin Cindric (R)	Team Penske	Ford	50
6	8	77	Landon Cassill (i)	Spire Motorsports	Chevrolet	50
7	10	42	Ty Dillon (Note: Ty Dillon initially won the second last chance race, but was penalized to the end of the lead lap for jumping the final restart.)	Petty GMS Motorsports	Chevrolet	50
8	6	45	Kurt Busch	23XI Racing	Toyota	45
9	3	48	Alex Bowman	Hendrick Motorsports	Chevrolet	45
10	5	19	Martin Truex Jr. (Note: As Truex was the highest-positioned driver in 2021 series points not qualified for the feature after heat races, the No. 19 team opted out of the race and used the provisional to guarantee his participation at the main event.)	Joe Gibbs Racing	Toyota	0
Official last chance race 2 results

=== Starting lineup ===
Pos	No.	Driver	Team	Manufacturer
1	18	Kyle Busch	Joe Gibbs Racing	Toyota
2	8	Tyler Reddick	Richard Childress Racing	Chevrolet
3	31	Justin Haley	Kaulig Racing	Chevrolet
4	22	Joey Logano	Team Penske	Ford
5	99	Daniel Suárez	Trackhouse Racing Team	Chevrolet
6	14	Chase Briscoe	Stewart-Haas Racing	Ford
7	24	William Byron	Hendrick Motorsports	Chevrolet
8	5	Kyle Larson	Hendrick Motorsports	Chevrolet
9	47	Ricky Stenhouse Jr.	JTG Daugherty Racing	Chevrolet
10	3	Austin Dillon	Richard Childress Racing	Chevrolet
11	20	Christopher Bell	Joe Gibbs Racing	Toyota
12	34	Michael McDowell	Front Row Motorsports	Ford
13	12	Ryan Blaney	Team Penske	Ford
14	41	Cole Custer	Stewart-Haas Racing	Ford
15	9	Chase Elliott	Hendrick Motorsports	Chevrolet
16	43	Erik Jones	Petty GMS Motorsports	Chevrolet
17	11	Denny Hamlin	Joe Gibbs Racing	Toyota
18	15	Ryan Preece	Rick Ware Racing	Ford
19	4	Kevin Harvick	Stewart-Haas Racing	Ford
20	23	Bubba Wallace	23XI Racing	Toyota
21	16	A. J. Allmendinger (i)	Kaulig Racing	Chevrolet
22	21	Harrison Burton (R)	Wood Brothers Racing	Ford
23	19	Martin Truex Jr.	Joe Gibbs Racing	Toyota
Official starting lineup

== Race ==
=== Race results ===
Pos	Grid	No	Driver	Team	Manufacturer	Laps
1	4	22	Joey Logano	Team Penske	Ford	150
2	1	18	Kyle Busch	Joe Gibbs Racing	Toyota	150
3	10	3	Austin Dillon	Richard Childress Racing	Chevrolet	150
4	16	43	Erik Jones	Petty GMS Motorsports	Chevrolet	150
5	8	5	Kyle Larson	Hendrick Motorsports	Chevrolet	150
6	7	24	William Byron	Hendrick Motorsports	Chevrolet	150
7	14	41	Cole Custer	Stewart-Haas Racing	Ford	150
8	11	20	Christopher Bell	Joe Gibbs Racing	Toyota	150
9	21	16	A. J. Allmendinger (i)	Kaulig Racing	Chevrolet	150
10	19	4	Kevin Harvick	Stewart-Haas Racing	Ford	150
11	15	9	Chase Elliott	Hendrick Motorsports	Chevrolet	150
12	22	21	Harrison Burton (R)	Wood Brothers Racing	Ford	150
13	9	47	Ricky Stenhouse Jr.	JTG Daugherty Racing	Chevrolet	150
14	5	99	Daniel Suárez	Trackhouse Racing Team	Chevrolet	150
15	23	19	Martin Truex Jr.	Joe Gibbs Racing	Toyota	149
16	12	34	Michael McDowell	Front Row Motorsports	Ford	149
17	13	12	Ryan Blaney	Team Penske	Ford	147
18	20	23	Bubba Wallace	23XI Racing	Toyota	146
19	3	31	Justin Haley	Kaulig Racing	Chevrolet	116
20	18	15	Ryan Preece	Rick Ware Racing	Ford	75
21	2	8	Tyler Reddick	Richard Childress Racing	Chevrolet	53
22	6	14	Chase Briscoe	Stewart-Haas Racing	Ford	53
23	17	11	Denny Hamlin	Joe Gibbs Racing	Toyota	52
Official race results

== Media ==
Fox covered the race on the television side. Mike Joy, Clint Bowyer, and three-time NASCAR Cup Series champion and Stewart-Haas Racing co-owner Tony Stewart handled the call in the booth for the race, while pit reporters Jamie Little and Regan Smith as well as Larry McReynolds handled interviews. Chris Myers and Jamie McMurray were the host and analyst in the studio.

=== Television ===
Fox
Booth announcers	Reporters	Studio
Lap-by-lap: Mike Joy; Color-commentator: Clint Bowyer; Color-commentator: Tony Stewart	Jamie Little; Regan Smith; Larry McReynolds	Host: Chris Myers; Analyst: Jamie McMurray

=== Radio ===
MRN Radio
Booth announcers	Turn announcers	Pit reporters
Lead announcer: Alex Hayden; Announcer: Jeff Striegle; Announcer: Rusty Wallace	Backstretch: Dan Hubbard	Steve Post; Kim Coon

=== Television Ratings ===
The Clash was viewed by more than 4.2 million people, which earned it a 2.32 rating. The ratings were only eclipsed by the 2022 Winter Olympics on NBC, which had 10.1 million viewers. Locally, the race earned a 2.7 and was the highest rated non-Daytona 500 race in the Los Angeles market in six years. This was the highest rated Clash since 2016, which was the last year it was aired on FOX.

The heat races that preceded the race had nearly 2.6 million viewers.
