= 2002 Budweiser Shootout =

Race details
- Race 1 of 2 exhibition races of the 2002 NASCAR Winston Cup Series
- Date: February 10, 2002
- Official name: 24th Annual Budweiser Shootout
- Location: Daytona Beach, Florida, Daytona International Speedway
- Course: Permanent racing facility
- Course length: 2.5 miles (4.0 km)
- Distance: 70 laps, 175 mi (281.635 km)
- Scheduled distance: 70 laps, 175 mi (281.635 km)
- Average speed: 181.295 miles per hour (291.766 km/h)

Pole position
Driver	Kurt Busch	Roush Racing
- Grid positions set by ballot

Most laps led
Driver	Tony Stewart	Joe Gibbs Racing
- Laps: 31

Winner
No. 20	Tony Stewart	Joe Gibbs Racing

Television in the United States
- Network: TNT
- Announcers: Allen Bestwick, Benny Parsons, Wally Dallenbach Jr.

Radio in the United States
- Radio: Motor Racing Network

The 2002 Budweiser Shootout was the first exhibition stock car race of the 2002 NASCAR Winston Cup Series season and the 24th iteration of the event. The race was held on Sunday, February 10, 2002, in Daytona Beach, Florida, at Daytona International Speedway, a 2.5-mile (4.0-km) permanent triangular-shaped superspeedway. The race took the scheduled 70 laps to complete. At race's end, Joe Gibbs Racing driver Tony Stewart would manage to dominate the second half of the race to take his second career Budweiser Shootout victory. To fill out the top three, Dale Earnhardt, Inc. driver Dale Earnhardt Jr. and Hendrick Motorsports driver Jeff Gordon would finish second and third, respectively.

== Background ==
The layout of Daytona International Speedway, the venue where the race was held.

Daytona International Speedway is one of three superspeedways to hold NASCAR races, the other two being Indianapolis Motor Speedway and Talladega Superspeedway. The standard track at Daytona International Speedway is a four-turn superspeedway that is 2.5 miles (4.0 km) long. The track's turns are banked at 31 degrees, while the front stretch, the location of the finish line, is banked at 18 degrees.

=== Format and eligibility ===
Caution laps would be counted, but the finish had to be under green, with the Truck Series green-white-checker rule used if necessary. A minimum of one two-tire green flag pit stop was required. The Bud Shootout Qualifier was discontinued because second round qualifying for Cup races had been eliminated.

Pole winners of the previous season were automatically eligible for the race. Then, previous winners who had not already qualified would receive automatic berths.

=== Entry list ===
- (R) denotes rookie driver.

#	Driver	Team	Make
1	Kenny Wallace	Dale Earnhardt, Inc.	Chevrolet
2	Rusty Wallace	Penske Racing South	Ford
5	Terry Labonte	Hendrick Motorsports	Chevrolet
6	Mark Martin	Roush Racing	Ford
8	Dale Earnhardt Jr.	Dale Earnhardt, Inc.	Chevrolet
9	Bill Elliott	Evernham Motorsports	Dodge
09	Geoff Bodine	Phoenix Racing	Ford
12	Ryan Newman (R)	Penske Racing South	Ford
14	Stacy Compton	A. J. Foyt Racing	Pontiac
18	Bobby Labonte	Joe Gibbs Racing	Pontiac
19	Casey Atwood	Evernham Motorsports	Dodge
20	Tony Stewart	Joe Gibbs Racing	Pontiac
24	Jeff Gordon	Hendrick Motorsports	Chevrolet
28	Ricky Rudd	Robert Yates Racing	Ford
30	Jeff Green	Richard Childress Racing	Chevrolet
32	Ricky Craven	PPI Motorsports	Ford
36	Ken Schrader	MB2 Motorsports	Pontiac
40	Sterling Marlin	Chip Ganassi Racing	Dodge
41	Jimmy Spencer	Chip Ganassi Racing	Dodge
66	Todd Bodine	Haas-Carter Motorsports	Ford
88	Dale Jarrett	Robert Yates Racing	Ford
97	Kurt Busch	Roush Racing	Ford

== Lineup ==
The starting lineup for the race was set by a random draw. Roush Racing driver Kurt Busch would manage to draw pole.

Pos.	#	Driver	Team	Make
1	97	Kurt Busch	Roush Racing	Ford
2	1	Kenny Wallace	Dale Earnhardt, Inc.	Chevrolet
3	20	Tony Stewart	Joe Gibbs Racing	Pontiac
4	36	Ken Schrader	MB2 Motorsports	Pontiac
5	9	Bill Elliott	Evernham Motorsports	Dodge
6	28	Ricky Rudd	Robert Yates Racing	Ford
7	5	Terry Labonte	Hendrick Motorsports	Chevrolet
8	12	Ryan Newman (R)	Penske Racing South	Ford
9	88	Dale Jarrett	Robert Yates Racing	Ford
10	41	Jimmy Spencer	Chip Ganassi Racing	Dodge
11	19	Casey Atwood	Evernham Motorsports	Dodge
12	2	Rusty Wallace	Penske Racing South	Ford
13	40	Sterling Marlin	Chip Ganassi Racing	Dodge
14	18	Bobby Labonte	Joe Gibbs Racing	Pontiac
15	32	Ricky Craven	PPI Motorsports	Ford
16	8	Dale Earnhardt Jr.	Dale Earnhardt, Inc.	Chevrolet
17	14	Stacy Compton	A. J. Foyt Racing	Pontiac
18	6	Mark Martin	Roush Racing	Ford
19	30	Jeff Green	Richard Childress Racing	Chevrolet
20	09	Geoff Bodine	Phoenix Racing	Ford
21	66	Todd Bodine	Haas-Carter Motorsports	Ford
22	24	Jeff Gordon	Hendrick Motorsports	Chevrolet
Official starting lineup

== Race results ==
Fin	St	#	Driver	Team	Make	Laps	Led	Status	Winnings
1	3	20	Tony Stewart	Joe Gibbs Racing	Pontiac	70	31	running	$200,955
2	16	8	Dale Earnhardt Jr.	Dale Earnhardt, Inc.	Chevrolet	70	20	running	$100,955
3	22	24	Jeff Gordon	Hendrick Motorsports	Chevrolet	70	0	running	$50,955
4	4	36	Ken Schrader	MB2 Motorsports	Pontiac	70	1	running	$43,955
5	13	40	Sterling Marlin	Chip Ganassi Racing	Dodge	70	0	running	$41,955
6	9	88	Dale Jarrett	Robert Yates Racing	Ford	70	0	running	$39,955
7	7	5	Terry Labonte	Hendrick Motorsports	Chevrolet	70	0	running	$37,955
8	14	18	Bobby Labonte	Joe Gibbs Racing	Pontiac	70	11	running	$36,955
9	2	1	Kenny Wallace	Dale Earnhardt, Inc.	Chevrolet	70	4	running	$35,955
10	21	66	Todd Bodine	Haas-Carter Motorsports	Ford	70	0	running	$34,955
11	12	2	Rusty Wallace	Penske Racing South	Ford	70	0	running	$33,955
12	18	6	Mark Martin	Roush Racing	Ford	70	0	running	$32,955
13	20	09	Geoff Bodine	Phoenix Racing	Ford	70	0	running	$31,954
14	1	97	Kurt Busch	Roush Racing	Ford	70	3	running	$30,954
15	8	12	Ryan Newman (R)	Penske Racing South	Ford	70	0	running	$29,954
16	19	30	Jeff Green	Richard Childress Racing	Chevrolet	70	0	running	$28,954
17	17	14	Stacy Compton	A. J. Foyt Racing	Pontiac	70	0	running	$27,954
18	5	9	Bill Elliott	Evernham Motorsports	Dodge	70	0	running	$26,954
19	15	32	Ricky Craven	PPI Motorsports	Ford	70	0	running	$25,954
20	10	41	Jimmy Spencer	Chip Ganassi Racing	Dodge	67	0	running	$24,954
21	6	28	Ricky Rudd	Robert Yates Racing	Ford	67	0	running	$23,954
22	11	19	Casey Atwood	Evernham Motorsports	Dodge	11	0	engine	$22,954
Official race results
