= 2006 Budweiser Shootout =

Race details
- Race 1 of 2 exhibition races of the 2006 NASCAR Nextel Cup Series
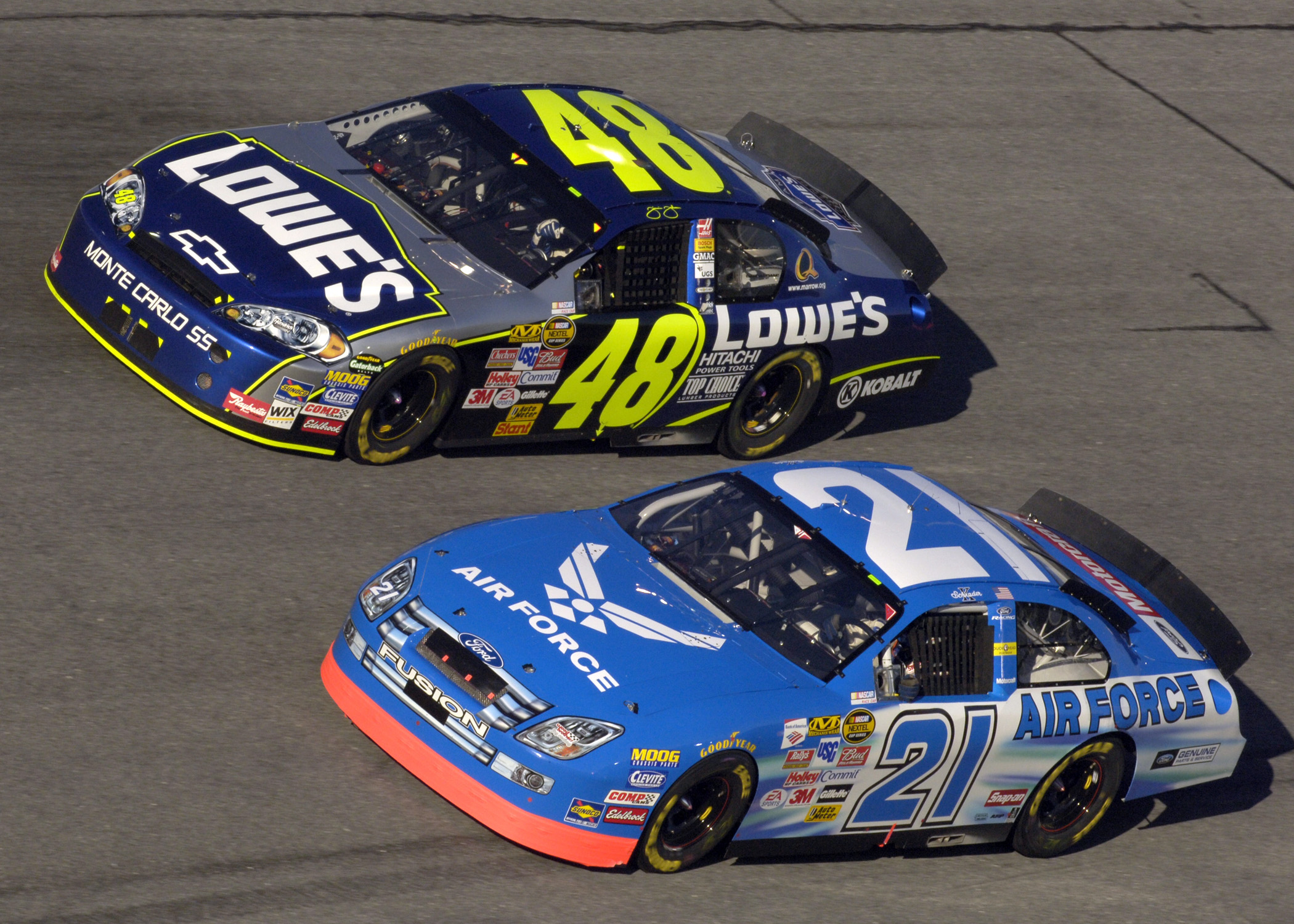
- Kenny Schrader driving the Air Force Wood Brothers Racing #21 Ford Fusion battles Jimmie Johnson for the lead of the Budweiser Shootout at Daytona International Speedway.
- Date: February 12, 2006
- Official name: 28th Annual Budweiser Shootout
- Course: Permanent racing facility
- Course length: 2.5 miles (4.0 km)
- Distance: 72 laps, 180 mi (289.681 km)
- Scheduled distance: 70 laps, 175 mi (281.635 km)
- Average speed: 153.627 miles per hour (247.239 km/h)
- Attendance: 60,000

Pole position
Driver	Ken Schrader	Wood Brothers/JTG Racing
- Grid positions set by ballot

Most laps led
Driver	Ken Schrader	Wood Brothers/JTG Racing
- Laps: 18

Winner
No. 11	Denny Hamlin	Joe Gibbs Racing

Television in the United States
- Network: TNT
- Announcers: Bill Weber, Benny Parsons, Wally Dallenbach Jr.

Radio in the United States
- Radio: Motor Racing Network

The 2006 Budweiser Shootout was the first exhibition stock car race of the 2006 NASCAR Nextel Cup Series season, and the 28th iteration of the event. The race was postponed to Sunday, February 12, 2006 from the originally scheduled date of February 11 due to rain. The race was held in Daytona Beach, Florida, at Daytona International Speedway, a 2.5 miles (4.0 km) permanent triangular-shaped superspeedway, before a crowd of 60,000. The race was extended from 70 laps to 72 due to a green–white–checker finish. At race's end, rookie Denny Hamlin, driving for Joe Gibbs Racing would pass teammate Tony Stewart on the final restart and hold off the field to pull off a stunning victory in the shootout, the first Budweiser Shootout win of his career. To fill out the podium, Dale Earnhardt Jr. of Dale Earnhardt, Inc. and Tony Stewart of Joe Gibbs Racing would finish second and third, respectively.

== Background ==
=== Format and eligibility ===
The race was broken up into two segments: a 20-lap segment, followed by a ten-minute intermission, concluding with a 50-lap second segment. While a pit stop was no longer required by rule, a reduction in fuel cell size (from 22 gallons to 13.5 gallons) made a fuel stop necessary. (In 2007, fuel cells were expanded to 18.5 gallons.) Many drivers also changed two tires during their fuel stop, as the time required to fuel the car allowed for a two-tire change without additional delay.

Pole winners of the previous season were automatically eligible for the race. Then, previous winners who had not already qualified would receive automatic berths.

=== Entry list ===
#	Driver	Team	Make	Sponsor
01	Joe Nemechek	MB2 Motorsports	Chevrolet	U. S. Army
5	Kyle Busch	Hendrick Motorsports	Chevrolet	Kellogg's, Carquest
6	Mark Martin	Roush Racing	Ford	AAA
8	Dale Earnhardt Jr.	Dale Earnhardt, Inc.	Chevrolet	Budweiser "King of Beers"
9	Kasey Kahne	Evernham Motorsports	Dodge	Dodge Dealers
10	Scott Riggs	Evernham Motorsports	Dodge	Valvoline, Stanley Tools
11	Denny Hamlin	Joe Gibbs Racing	Chevrolet	FedEx Express
12	Ryan Newman	Penske Racing	Dodge	Alltel
17	Matt Kenseth	Roush Racing	Ford	Maxwell House, Post
20	Tony Stewart	Joe Gibbs Racing	Chevrolet	The Home Depot
21	Ken Schrader	Wood Brothers/JTG Racing	Ford	U. S. Air Force
24	Jeff Gordon	Hendrick Motorsports	Chevrolet	DuPont
25	Brian Vickers	Hendrick Motorsports	Chevrolet	GMAC
26	Jamie McMurray	Roush Racing	Ford	Crown Royal
29	Kevin Harvick	Richard Childress Racing	Chevrolet	Reese's Caramel
36	Bill Elliott	MB2 Motorsports	Chevrolet	Ginn Clubs & Resorts
38	Elliott Sadler	Robert Yates Racing	Ford	M&M's
48	Jimmie Johnson	Hendrick Motorsports	Chevrolet	Lowe's
55	Michael Waltrip	Bill Davis Racing	Dodge	NAPA Auto Parts
88	Dale Jarrett	Robert Yates Racing	Ford	UPS
96	Terry Labonte*	Hall of Fame Racing	Chevrolet	DLP HDTV, Tweeter
99	Carl Edwards	Roush Racing	Ford	Office Depot

*Withdrew, according to crew chief Philippe Lopez.

== Starting lineup ==
The starting lineup was determined by a blind draw. Ken Schrader of Wood Brothers/JTG Racing would draw the pole.

Pos.	#	Driver	Team	Make
1	21	Ken Schrader	Wood Brothers/JTG Racing	Ford
2	48	Jimmie Johnson	Hendrick Motorsports	Chevrolet
3	20	Tony Stewart	Joe Gibbs Racing	Chevrolet
4	01	Joe Nemechek	MB2 Motorsports	Chevrolet
5	9	Kasey Kahne	Evernham Motorsports	Dodge
6	38	Elliott Sadler	Robert Yates Racing	Ford
7	12	Ryan Newman	Penske Racing	Dodge
8	10	Scott Riggs	Evernham Motorsports	Dodge
9	88	Dale Jarrett	Robert Yates Racing	Ford
10	24	Jeff Gordon	Hendrick Motorsports	Chevrolet
11	99	Carl Edwards	Roush Racing	Ford
12	36	Bill Elliott	MB2 Motorsports	Chevrolet
13	6	Mark Martin	Roush Racing	Ford
14	5	Kyle Busch	Hendrick Motorsports	Chevrolet
15	11	Denny Hamlin	Joe Gibbs Racing	Chevrolet
16	17	Matt Kenseth	Roush Racing	Ford
17	26	Jamie McMurray	Roush Racing	Ford
18	29	Kevin Harvick	Richard Childress Racing	Chevrolet
19	8	Dale Earnhardt Jr.	Dale Earnhardt, Inc.	Chevrolet
20	25	Brian Vickers	Hendrick Motorsports	Chevrolet
21	55	Michael Waltrip	Bill Davis Racing	Dodge
22	96	Terry Labonte*	Hall of Fame Racing	Chevrolet

*Withdrew.

== Race ==
=== Segment 1 ===
Pole sitter Ken Schrader led the first lap of the race. With 8 laps to go in segment 1, Jimmie Johnson took the lead from Schrader. On that same lap in turn 3, Carl Edwards went below the yellow line to avoid Kasey Kahne coming down into him. With 6 laps to go in segment 1, Schrader took the lead back from Johnson. On the same lap, the big one struck on the backstretch taking out 9 cars. It started when Jamie McMurray got hooked by Brian Vickers and McMurray turned down into Ryan Newman. The wreck collected Ryan Newman, Jamie McMurray, Brian Vickers, Kyle Busch, Mark Martin, Dale Earnhardt Jr., Kasey Kahne, Scott Riggs, and Dale Jarrett. Segment 1 ended under caution and Ken Schrader won the segment. After going below the line with 8 to go in segment 1, Carl Edwards was penalized by NASCAR and was sent to the rear of the field for the restart.

=== Rest of race ===
The race restarted on lap 21 and Jimmie Johnson took the lead from Schrader. On lap 23, the second caution flew when Jeff Gordon's car began smoking from the rear. The race restarted on lap 29 with Jimmie Johnson remaining as the leader. On lap 32, Kyle Busch took the lead from Johnson. On lap 35, Michael Waltrip took the lead from Busch. On lap 40, Jimmie Johnson and Kyle Busch went down pit road when Carl Edwards went under the yellow line and underneath Johnson and Busch and made no contact with both of the cars and Edwards went back up the track and lost 3 positions. Everyone made it through unscathed and there was no accident. But for some reason with 28 laps to go just 3 laps after Edwards dodged Johnson and Busch, NASCAR black flagged Carl Edwards and said that Edwards passed Johnson and Busch below the yellow line which confused both commentators Bill Weber and Wally Dallenbach Jr. Edwards and his team argued that Edwards was trying to avoid an accident from happening and lost positions. But yet, NASCAR still called Edwards to do a pass through on pit road which Edwards refused to do even saying on his radio "no I'm not doing it! It's wrong!" Edwards' crew chief Bob Osborne calmed Edwards down and told him to do the penalty which Edwards did eventually serve his penalty. With 25 laps to go, Tony Stewart passed Michael Waltrip for the lead. With 23 to go, Jamie McMurray took the lead followed by Dale Earnhardt Jr. and Scott Riggs in the next 2 laps during green flag pit stops. Unfortunately for Carl Edwards, after doing his pass through, Edwards was penalized again for too fast entering pit road. After everything cycled through, Denny Hamlin was the race leader. With 8 laps to go, Kyle Busch attempted to take the lead from Hamlin and beat Hamlin to the line to lead that lap but Denny took it back with 7 to go. With 4 laps to go, Tony Stewart took the lead from Hamlin. Unfortunately for Stewart, the 3rd and final caution of the race flew when Ryan Newman blew a tire down the backstretch and left debris. The race would go into a green-white-checker finish. On the restart, Hamlin took the lead from Stewart and Hamlin held off the pack to surprise everyone and win the Budwiser Shootout. Hamlin became the first rookie to win the Shootout in NASCAR history. Dale Earnhardt Jr., Tony Stewart, Scott Riggs, and Jimmie Johnson rounded out the top 5 while Matt Kenseth, Mark Martin, Jamie McMurray, Joe Nemechek, and Dale Jarrett rounded out the top 10.

== Race results ==
Fin	St	#	Driver	Team	Make	Laps	Led	Status	Winnings
1	15	11	Denny Hamlin	Joe Gibbs Racing	Chevrolet	72	16	running	$213,380
2	19	8	Dale Earnhardt Jr.	Dale Earnhardt, Inc.	Chevrolet	72	1	running	$113,377
3	3	20	Tony Stewart	Joe Gibbs Racing	Chevrolet	72	6	running	$62,877
4	8	10	Scott Riggs	Evernham Motorsports	Dodge	72	2	running	$52,877
5	2	48	Jimmie Johnson	Hendrick Motorsports	Chevrolet	72	13	running	$51,377
6	16	17	Matt Kenseth	Roush Racing	Ford	72	0	running	$48,377
7	13	6	Mark Martin	Roush Racing	Ford	72	0	running	$46,377
8	17	26	Jamie McMurray	Roush Racing	Ford	72	1	running	$45,377
9	4	01	Joe Nemechek	MB2 Motorsports	Chevrolet	72	0	running	$44,377
10	9	88	Dale Jarrett	Robert Yates Racing	Ford	72	0	running	$43,377
11	21	55	Michael Waltrip	Bill Davis Racing	Dodge	72	11	running	$41,377
12	12	36	Bill Elliott	MB2 Motorsports	Chevrolet	72	0	running	$40,377
13	6	38	Elliott Sadler	Robert Yates Racing	Ford	72	0	running	$39,377
14	1	21	Ken Schrader	Wood Brothers/JTG Racing	Ford	72	18	running	$38,377
15	14	5	Kyle Busch	Hendrick Motorsports	Chevrolet	72	4	running	$37,377
16	11	99	Carl Edwards	Roush Racing	Ford	72	0	running	$36,377
17	7	12	Ryan Newman	Penske Racing	Dodge	68	0	out	$35,377
18	5	9	Kasey Kahne	Evernham Motorsports	Dodge	35	0	accident	$34,377
19	10	24	Jeff Gordon	Hendrick Motorsports	Chevrolet	23	0	suspension	$33,377
20	18	29	Kevin Harvick	Richard Childress Racing	Chevrolet	15	0	engine	$31,377
21	20	25	Brian Vickers	Hendrick Motorsports	Chevrolet	14	0	accident	$30,377
22	22	96	Terry Labonte	Hall of Fame Racing	Chevrolet	0	0	withdrew	$0
