= 2004 Budweiser Shootout =

Race details
- Race 1 of 2 exhibition races of the 2004 NASCAR Nextel Cup Series
- Date: February 7, 2004
- Official name: 26th Annual Budweiser Shootout
- Location: Daytona Beach, Florida, Daytona International Speedway
- Course: Permanent racing facility
- Course length: 2.5 miles (4.0 km)
- Distance: 70 laps, 175 mi (281.635 km)
- Scheduled distance: 70 laps, 175 mi (281.635 km)
- Average speed: 150.826 miles per hour (242.731 km/h)
- Attendance: 75,000

Pole position
Driver	Jeremy Mayfield	Evernham Motorsports
- Grid positions set by ballot

Most laps led
Driver	Terry Labonte	Hendrick Motorsports
- Laps: 17

Winner
No. 88	Dale Jarrett	Robert Yates Racing

Television in the United States
- Network: TNT
- Announcers: Allen Bestwick, Benny Parsons, Wally Dallenbach Jr.

Radio in the United States
- Radio: Motor Racing Network

The 2004 Budweiser Shootout was the first exhibition stock car race of the 2004 NASCAR Nextel Cup Series season and the 26th iteration of the event. The race was held on Saturday, February 7, 2004, before a crowd of 75,000 in Daytona Beach, Florida, at Daytona International Speedway, a 2.5-mile (4.0-km) permanent triangular-shaped superspeedway. The race took the scheduled 70 laps to complete. Robert Yates Racing driver Dale Jarrett would make a last lap pass and defend against Dale Earnhardt, Inc. driver Dale Earnhardt Jr. to win his third Budweiser Shootout. To fill out the podium, Kevin Harvick of Richard Childress Racing would finish third.

== Background ==
The layout of Daytona International Speedway, the venue where the race was held.

Daytona International Speedway is one of three superspeedways to hold NASCAR races, the other two being Indianapolis Motor Speedway and Talladega Superspeedway. The standard track at Daytona International Speedway is a four-turn superspeedway that is 2.5 miles (4.0 km) long. The track's turns are banked at 31 degrees, while the front stretch, the location of the finish line, is banked at 18 degrees.

=== Format and eligibility ===
The race was broken up into two segments: a 20-lap segment, followed by a ten-minute intermission, concluding with a 50-lap second segment. While a pit stop was no longer required by rule, a reduction in fuel cell size (from 22 gallons to 13.5 gallons) made a fuel stop necessary. (In 2007, fuel cells were expanded to 18.5 gallons.) Many drivers also changed two tires during their fuel stop, as the time required to fuel the car allowed for a two-tire change without additional delay.

Pole winners of the previous season were automatically eligible for the race. Then, previous winners who had not already qualified would receive automatic berths.

=== Entry list ===
#	Driver	Team	Make	Sponsor
01	Boris Said	MBV Motorsports	Chevrolet	U. S. Army
2	Rusty Wallace	Penske-Jasper Racing	Dodge	Miller Lite
5	Terry Labonte	Hendrick Motorsports	Chevrolet	Kellogg's
6	Mark Martin	Roush Racing	Ford	Kraft, Oscar Mayer
8	Dale Earnhardt Jr.	Dale Earnhardt, Inc.	Chevrolet	Budweiser Born On Date 7 Feb 2004
10	Mike Skinner	MBV Motorsports	Chevrolet	Valvoline Max Life
12	Ryan Newman	Penske-Jasper Racing	Dodge	Alltel
18	Bobby Labonte	Joe Gibbs Racing	Chevrolet	Interstate Batteries
19	Jeremy Mayfield	Evernham Motorsports	Dodge	Dodge Dealers, 2004 NHL All-Star Game
20	Tony Stewart	Joe Gibbs Racing	Chevrolet	The Home Depot
23	Dave Blaney	Bill Davis Racing	Dodge	Whelen Engineering
24	Jeff Gordon	Hendrick Motorsports	Chevrolet	DuPont
29	Kevin Harvick	Richard Childress Racing	Chevrolet	GM Goodwrench
38	Elliott Sadler	Robert Yates Racing	Ford	M&M's Black and White
42	Jamie McMurray	Chip Ganassi Racing	Dodge	Texaco, Havoline
43	Jeff Green*	Petty Enterprises	Dodge	Cheerios
48	Jimmie Johnson	Hendrick Motorsports	Chevrolet	Lowe's
49	Ken Schrader	BAM Racing	Dodge	Schwan's Home Service
88	Dale Jarrett	Robert Yates Racing	Ford	UPS
91	Bill Elliott	Evernham Motorsports	Dodge	Leukemia & Lymphoma Society

*Withdrew due to the team's owner, Richard Petty, holding a 50-year promise to his mother that his race team would not be affiliated with alcohol in any way.

== Practice ==
=== First practice ===
The first practice session was held on Friday, February 6, at 3:45 PM EST, and would last for one hour and 15 minutes. Kevin Harvick of Richard Childress Racing would set the fastest time in the session, with a lap of 47.756 and an average speed of 188.458 miles per hour (303.294 km/h).

Pos.	#	Driver	Team	Make	Time	Speed
1	29	Kevin Harvick	Richard Childress Racing	Chevrolet	47.756	188.458
2	2	Rusty Wallace	Penske-Jasper Racing	Dodge	47.832	188.159
3	01	Boris Said	MBV Motorsports	Chevrolet	47.856	188.064
Full first practice results

=== Second and final practice ===
The second and final practice session, sometimes referred to as Happy Hour, was held on Friday, February 6, at 6:30 PM EST, and would last for one hour. Dale Earnhardt Jr. of Dale Earnhardt, Inc. would set the fastest time in the session, with a lap of 47.111 and an average speed of 191.038 miles per hour (307.446 km/h).

Pos.	#	Driver	Team	Make	Time	Speed
1	8	Dale Earnhardt Jr.	Dale Earnhardt, Inc.	Chevrolet	47.111	191.038
2	18	Bobby Labonte	Joe Gibbs Racing	Chevrolet	47.125	190.981
3	29	Kevin Harvick	Richard Childress Racing	Chevrolet	47.362	190.026
Full Happy Hour practice results

== Starting lineup ==
The starting lineup was determined by a blind draw. Jeremy Mayfield of Evernham Motorsports would win the pole.

=== Full starting lineup ===
Pos.	#	Driver	Team	Make
1	19	Jeremy Mayfield	Evernham Motorsports	Dodge
2	24	Jeff Gordon	Hendrick Motorsports	Chevrolet
3	42	Jamie McMurray	Chip Ganassi Racing	Dodge
4	23	Dave Blaney	Bill Davis Racing	Dodge
5	29	Kevin Harvick	Richard Childress Racing	Chevrolet
6	5	Terry Labonte	Hendrick Motorsports	Chevrolet
7	6	Mark Martin	Roush Racing	Ford
8	01	Boris Said	MBV Motorsports	Chevrolet
9	38	Elliott Sadler	Robert Yates Racing	Ford
10	91	Bill Elliott	Evernham Motorsports	Dodge
11	2	Rusty Wallace	Penske-Jasper Racing	Dodge
12	18	Bobby Labonte	Joe Gibbs Racing	Chevrolet
13	10	Mike Skinner	MBV Motorsports	Chevrolet
14	49	Ken Schrader	BAM Racing	Dodge
15	88	Dale Jarrett	Robert Yates Racing	Ford
16	12	Ryan Newman	Penske-Jasper Racing	Dodge
17	48	Jimmie Johnson	Hendrick Motorsports	Chevrolet
18	20	Tony Stewart	Joe Gibbs Racing	Chevrolet
19	8	Dale Earnhardt Jr.	Dale Earnhardt, Inc.	Chevrolet
Withdrew
WD	43	Jeff Green	Petty Enterprises	Dodge

== Race results ==
Fin	St	#	Driver	Team	Make	Laps	Led	Status	Winnings
1	15	88	Dale Jarrett	Robert Yates Racing	Ford	70	1	running	$213,000
2	19	8	Dale Earnhardt Jr.	Dale Earnhardt, Inc.	Chevrolet	70	0	running	$113,000
3	5	29	Kevin Harvick	Richard Childress Racing	Chevrolet	70	10	running	$63,000
4	7	6	Mark Martin	Roush Racing	Ford	70	0	running	$53,000
5	2	24	Jeff Gordon	Hendrick Motorsports	Chevrolet	70	16	running	$51,000
6	11	2	Rusty Wallace	Penske-Jasper Racing	Dodge	70	0	running	$49,000
7	18	20	Tony Stewart	Joe Gibbs Racing	Chevrolet	70	0	running	$47,000
8	6	5	Terry Labonte	Hendrick Motorsports	Chevrolet	70	17	running	$46,000
9	17	48	Jimmie Johnson	Hendrick Motorsports	Chevrolet	70	0	running	$45,000
10	8	01	Boris Said	MBV Motorsports	Chevrolet	70	0	running	$44,000
11	12	18	Bobby Labonte	Joe Gibbs Racing	Chevrolet	70	0	running	$42,000
12	9	38	Elliott Sadler	Robert Yates Racing	Ford	70	1	running	$41,000
13	14	49	Ken Schrader	BAM Racing	Dodge	70	0	running	$40,000
14	10	91	Bill Elliott	Evernham Motorsports	Dodge	70	0	running	$39,000
15	13	10	Mike Skinner	MBV Motorsports	Chevrolet	70	0	running	$38,000
16	16	12	Ryan Newman	Penske-Jasper Racing	Dodge	69	4	accident	$37,000
17	3	42	Jamie McMurray	Chip Ganassi Racing	Dodge	68	8	accident	$36,000
18	1	19	Jeremy Mayfield	Evernham Motorsports	Dodge	59	0	accident	$35,000
19	4	23	Dave Blaney	Bill Davis Racing	Dodge	59	0	accident	$34,000
Withdrew
WD		43	Jeff Green	Petty Enterprises	Dodge				
Official race results
