= 2015 NASCAR Sprint All-Star Race =

31st iteration of the NASCAR All-Star Race

Race details
- Date: May 16, 2015
- Location: Charlotte Motor Speedway in Concord, North Carolina
- Course: Permanent racing facility 1.5 mi (2.4 km)
- Distance: Showdown: 40 laps, 60 mi (97 km); All-Star Race: 110 laps, 165 mi (266 km)
- Avg Speed: Showdown: 102.370 mph (164.749 km/h); All-Star Race: 106.452 mph (171.318 km/h)

Sprint Showdown
- Pole: Paul Menard
- Time: 28.470
- Winner (segment 1): Greg Biffle
- Winner (segment 2): Clint Bowyer
- Fan Vote winner: Danica Patrick
- Weather: Mostly sunny with a temperature of 79 °F (26 °C); wind out of the south at 5 mph (8.0 km/h)

Sprint All-Star Race
- Pole: Denny Hamlin
- Time: 1:51.227
- Most laps led: Brad Keselowski
- Laps led: 49
- Winner: Denny Hamlin
- Weather: Mostly cloudy with a temperature of 74 °F (23 °C); wind out of the south/southeast at 3 mph (4.8 km/h)

Television
- Network: Fox Sports 1
- Announcers: Mike Joy, Larry McReynolds and Darrell Waltrip
- Nielsen Ratings: 2.1/4 (Overnight); 2.1/4 (Final); 3.8 Million viewers

Radio
- Network: Motor Racing Network
- Announcers: Joe Moore, Jeff Striegle and Rusty Wallace (Booth); Dave Moody (1 & 2); Kyle Rickey (3 & 4) (Turns)

The 2015 NASCAR Sprint All-Star Race (XXXI) was a NASCAR Sprint Cup Series stock car race held on May 16, 2015, at Charlotte Motor Speedway in Concord, North Carolina. Contested over 110 laps, it was the second exhibition race of the 2015 Sprint Cup Series season.

== Report ==
=== Background ===
Charlotte Motor Speedway, the track where the race was held.

"These updates were made to ensure that our fans have every opportunity to see the best drivers in one of our crown jewel events and give them even more on-track action," said Steve O’Donnell, NASCAR executive vice president and chief racing development officer. "Expanding this field and adding laps delivers that to our fans, raising the competition level and ensuring that this race continues to be the biggest all-star event in all of sports."

— NASCAR executive vice-president Steve O'Donnell speaking on Sirius XM NASCAR Radio.

Race winners from the previous season through the 2015 SpongeBob SquarePants 400 at Kansas Speedway, and all previous All-Star race winners and Sprint Cup champions who had attempted to qualify for every race in 2015 were eligible to compete in the All-Star Race. For the first time since the 2002 All-Star Race, the Sprint Showdown was split into multiple segments, with the winners of each 20-lap segment advancing to compete in the race, as well as the Sprint fan vote winner. The All-Star Race was 110 laps long, separated into five segments: four segments of 25 laps and a final segment of ten laps. A mandatory pit stop was between the final two segments, while pitting between the 25 lap segments was optional. A minimum of 20 drivers took part of the All-Star Race. Seventeen were automatically in the race while three got in via the Showdown. Kyle Busch, who was not expected to return to racing until Independence Day weekend at Daytona International Speedway, announced - via a video on Twitter - that he was coming back for the All-Star Race. Busch had been injured in a support series race in February and had missed the entire season up to that point.

==== Entry list ====
===== Sprint Showdown =====
The entry list for the Sprint Showdown was released on Tuesday, May 12 at 10:04 a.m. Eastern time. Thirty drivers were entered for the race, but Travis Kvapil's entry was withdrawn before the race.

No.	Driver	Team	Manufacturer
3	Austin Dillon	Richard Childress Racing	Chevrolet
6	Trevor Bayne	Roush Fenway Racing	Ford
7	Alex Bowman	Tommy Baldwin Racing	Chevrolet
9	Sam Hornish Jr.	Richard Petty Motorsports	Ford
10	Danica Patrick	Stewart–Haas Racing	Chevrolet
13	Casey Mears	Germain Racing	Chevrolet
15	Clint Bowyer	Michael Waltrip Racing	Toyota
16	Greg Biffle	Roush Fenway Racing	Ford
17	Ricky Stenhouse Jr.	Roush Fenway Racing	Ford
23	J. J. Yeley	BK Racing	Toyota
25	Chase Elliott	Hendrick Motorsports	Chevrolet
26	Jeb Burton (R)	BK Racing	Toyota
30	Jeff Green	The Motorsports Group	Chevrolet
32	Mike Bliss	Go FAS Racing	Ford
33	Alex Kennedy (R)	Hillman-Circle Sport LLC	Chevrolet
35	Cole Whitt	Front Row Motorsports	Ford
38	David Gilliland	Front Row Motorsports	Ford
39	Travis Kvapil	Hillman-Circle Sport LLC	Chevrolet
40	Landon Cassill	Hillman-Circle Sport LLC	Chevrolet
42	Kyle Larson	Chip Ganassi Racing	Chevrolet
46	Michael Annett	HScott Motorsports	Chevrolet
51	Justin Allgaier	HScott Motorsports	Chevrolet
55	David Ragan	Michael Waltrip Racing	Toyota
62	Brendan Gaughan	Premium Motorsports	Chevrolet
66	Tanner Berryhill	Premium Motorsports	Chevrolet
78	Martin Truex Jr.	Furniture Row Racing	Chevrolet
83	Matt DiBenedetto (R)	BK Racing	Toyota
95	Michael McDowell	Leavine Family Racing	Ford
98	Josh Wise	Phil Parsons Racing	Ford
Official Sprint Showdown entry list

Key	Meaning
(R)	Rookie

===== Sprint All-Star Race =====
The entry list for the All-Star Race was released that same day at 11:03 a.m. Seventeen cars were automatically entered for the race. Jeff Gordon started his 22nd and final All-Star Race.

No.	Driver	Team	Manufacturer
1	Jamie McMurray	Chip Ganassi Racing	Chevrolet
2	Brad Keselowski	Team Penske	Ford
4	Kevin Harvick	Stewart–Haas Racing	Chevrolet
5	Kasey Kahne	Hendrick Motorsports	Chevrolet
11	Denny Hamlin	Joe Gibbs Racing	Toyota
14	Tony Stewart	Stewart–Haas Racing	Chevrolet
18	Kyle Busch	Joe Gibbs Racing	Toyota
19	Carl Edwards	Joe Gibbs Racing	Toyota
20	Matt Kenseth	Joe Gibbs Racing	Toyota
22	Joey Logano	Team Penske	Ford
24	Jeff Gordon	Hendrick Motorsports	Chevrolet
31	Ryan Newman	Richard Childress Racing	Chevrolet
41	Kurt Busch	Stewart–Haas Racing	Chevrolet
43	Aric Almirola	Richard Petty Motorsports	Ford
47	A. J. Allmendinger	JTG Daugherty Racing	Chevrolet
48	Jimmie Johnson	Hendrick Motorsports	Chevrolet
88	Dale Earnhardt Jr.	Hendrick Motorsports	Chevrolet
Official Sprint All-Star Race entry list

== Practice ==
=== Sprint Showdown practice ===
Austin Dillon was the fastest in the lone Sprint Showdown practice session with a time of 28.528 and a speed of 189.288 mph (304.630 km/h).

Pos	No.	Driver	Team	Manufacturer	Time	Speed
1	3	Austin Dillon	Richard Childress Racing	Chevrolet	28.528	189.288
2	16	Greg Biffle	Roush Fenway Racing	Ford	28.585	188.910
3	78	Martin Truex Jr.	Furniture Row Racing	Chevrolet	28.602	188.798
Official Sprint Showdown practice results

=== All-Star Race practice ===
Kyle Busch, in his first race since breaking both his right leg and left foot at Daytona in February, was the fastest in the lone Sprint All-Star Race practice session with a time of 28.589 and a speed of 188.884 mph (303.979 km/h). "I was excited to get back in here, see my guys and get the taste of all that again," Busch said. "Everything went according to plan and we had some decent speed in race trim. We're excited and hopefully, we can see that speed again tomorrow night."

Pos	No.	Driver	Team	Manufacturer	Time	Speed
1	18	Kyle Busch	Joe Gibbs Racing	Toyota	28.589	188.884
2	1	Jamie McMurray	Chip Ganassi Racing	Chevrolet	28.663	188.396
3	4	Kevin Harvick	Stewart–Haas Racing	Chevrolet	28.684	188.258
Official Sprint All-Star Race practice results

== Qualifying (Showdown) ==
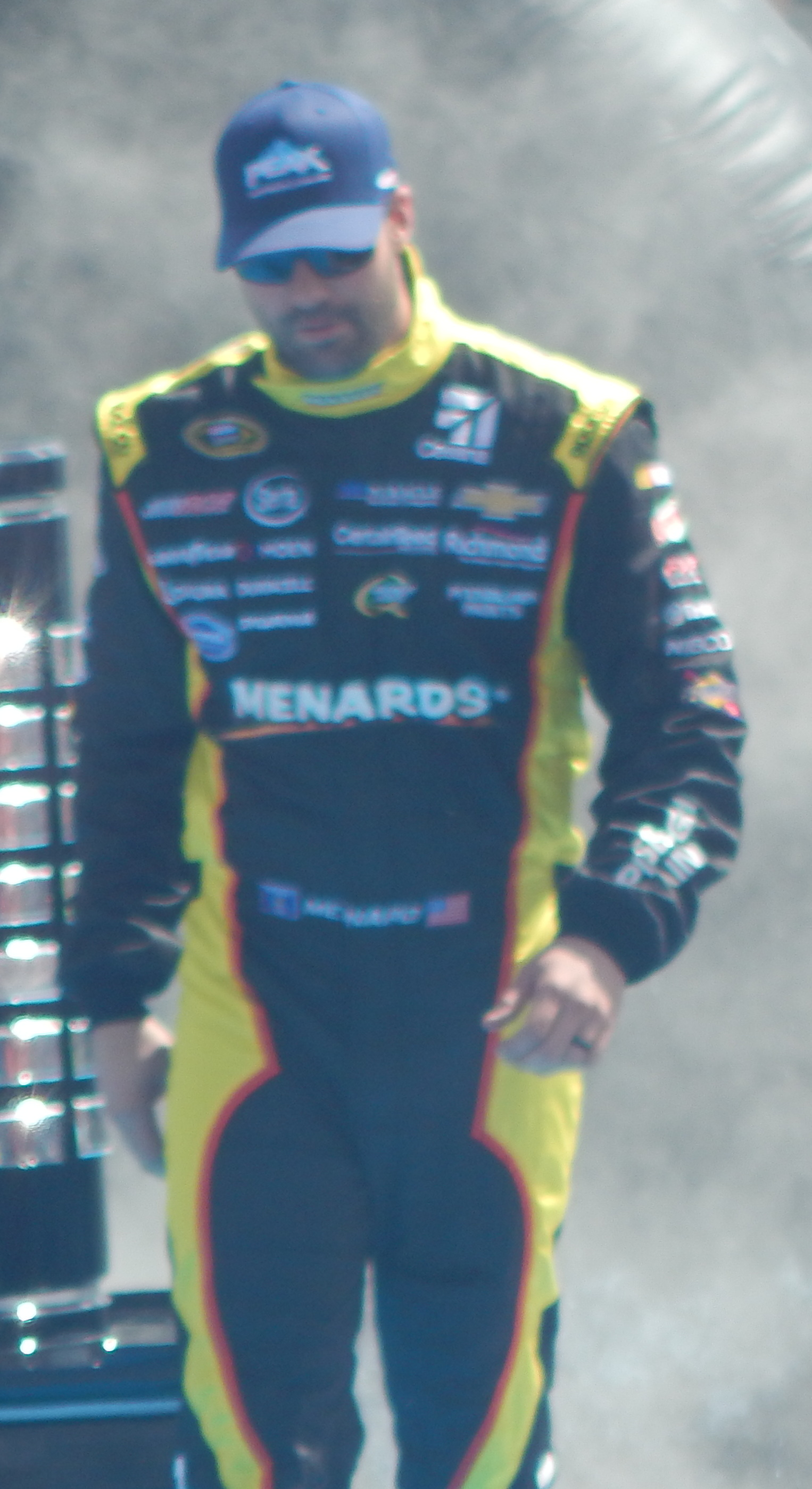
Paul Menard, seen here at the 2015 Daytona 500, scored the pole for the Sprint Showdown.

Paul Menard won the pole for the Sprint Showdown with a time of 28.470 and a speed of 189.673 mph (305.249 km/h).

=== Qualifying results (Showdown) ===
Pos	No.	Driver	Team	Manufacturer	R1	R2
1	27	Paul Menard	Richard Childress Racing	Chevrolet	28.434	28.470
2	16	Greg Biffle	Roush Fenway Racing	Ford	28.427	28.472
3	55	David Ragan	Michael Waltrip Racing	Toyota	28.595	28.564
4	15	Clint Bowyer	Michael Waltrip Racing	Toyota	28.682	28.678
5	3	Austin Dillon	Richard Childress Racing	Chevrolet	28.777	28.697
6	42	Kyle Larson	Chip Ganassi Racing	Chevrolet	28.694	28.708
7	78	Martin Truex Jr.	Furniture Row Racing	Chevrolet	28.563	28.715
8	10	Danica Patrick	Stewart–Haas Racing	Chevrolet	28.533	28.724
9	13	Casey Mears	Germain Racing	Chevrolet	28.633	28.880
10	95	Michael McDowell	Leavine Family Racing	Ford	28.773	28.895
11	25	Chase Elliott	Hendrick Motorsports	Chevrolet	28.712	28.982
12	17	Ricky Stenhouse Jr.	Roush Fenway Racing	Ford	28.521	28.996
13	9	Sam Hornish Jr.	Richard Petty Motorsports	Ford	28.777	—
14	51	Justin Allgaier	HScott Motorsports	Chevrolet	28.817	—
15	6	Trevor Bayne	Roush Fenway Racing	Ford	28.857	—
16	7	Alex Bowman	Tommy Baldwin Racing	Chevrolet	28.970	—
17	38	David Gilliland	Front Row Motorsports	Ford	28.997	—
18	32	Mike Bliss	Go FAS Racing	Ford	29.124	—
19	98	Josh Wise	Phil Parsons Racing	Ford	29.164	—
20	40	Landon Cassill	Hillman-Circle Sport LLC	Chevrolet	29.191	—
21	83	Matt DiBenedetto (R)	BK Racing	Toyota	29.208	—
22	26	Jeb Burton (R)	BK Racing	Toyota	29.239	—
23	35	Cole Whitt	Front Row Motorsports	Ford	29.258	—
24	23	J. J. Yeley	BK Racing	Toyota	29.561	—
25	46	Michael Annett	HScott Motorsports	Chevrolet	29.753	—
26	30	Jeff Green	The Motorsports Group	Chevrolet	29.779	—
27	62	Brendan Gaughan	Premium Motorsports	Chevrolet	30.122	—
28	33	Alex Kennedy (R)	Hillman-Circle Sport LLC	Chevrolet	30.124	—
29	66	Tanner Berryhill (R)	Premium Motorsports	Chevrolet	30.495	—
Withdrew
WD	39	Travis Kvapil	Hillman-Circle Sport LLC	Chevrolet	—	—
Official Sprint Showdown qualifying results

== Sprint Showdown ==
=== Segment One ===
The race was scheduled to start at 7:15 p.m., but started at 7:25 p.m. when Paul Menard led the field to the green flag. He didn't get a good start and Greg Biffle easily took the lead. Biffle pulled away from the field on his way to winning the first segment with relative ease. The first caution of the race flew on lap 21 to end the segment. Clint Bowyer assumed the lead with Biffle advancing to the All-Star Race. He lost the lead, however, on pit road to David Ragan.

=== Segment Two ===
Martin Truex Jr. jumped to the lead with 20 laps to go on the restart. The second caution of the race flew for a one car spin in turn 4. Exiting 4, J. J. Yeley got loose and spun through the grass on the front stretch. Unlike in the first segment, only green flag laps count. Only one car opted to pit under the caution.

The race restarted with 18 laps to go. Kyle Larson matched Truex the whole lap to take the lead off of turn 4. Clint Bowyer went three-wide for the lead with 16 laps to go. Larson got tapped by Sam Hornish Jr. in 3 and about tagged the wall in 4. He saved it, but brought the car down pit with eight laps to go and ending his chance of advancing to the All-Star Race. It was ultimately Clint Bowyer who would win to advance to the All-Star Race. Danica Patrick won the fan vote to advance to the All-Star Race. “I have great fans," Patrick said in a press release. "I know I didn’t make it in last year, but I heard that they voted even more last year than the year before that and so I’m sure that this year was nothing different. I think I got close at the end and they came through. They always come through. I am lucky to have such great fans."

=== Results ===
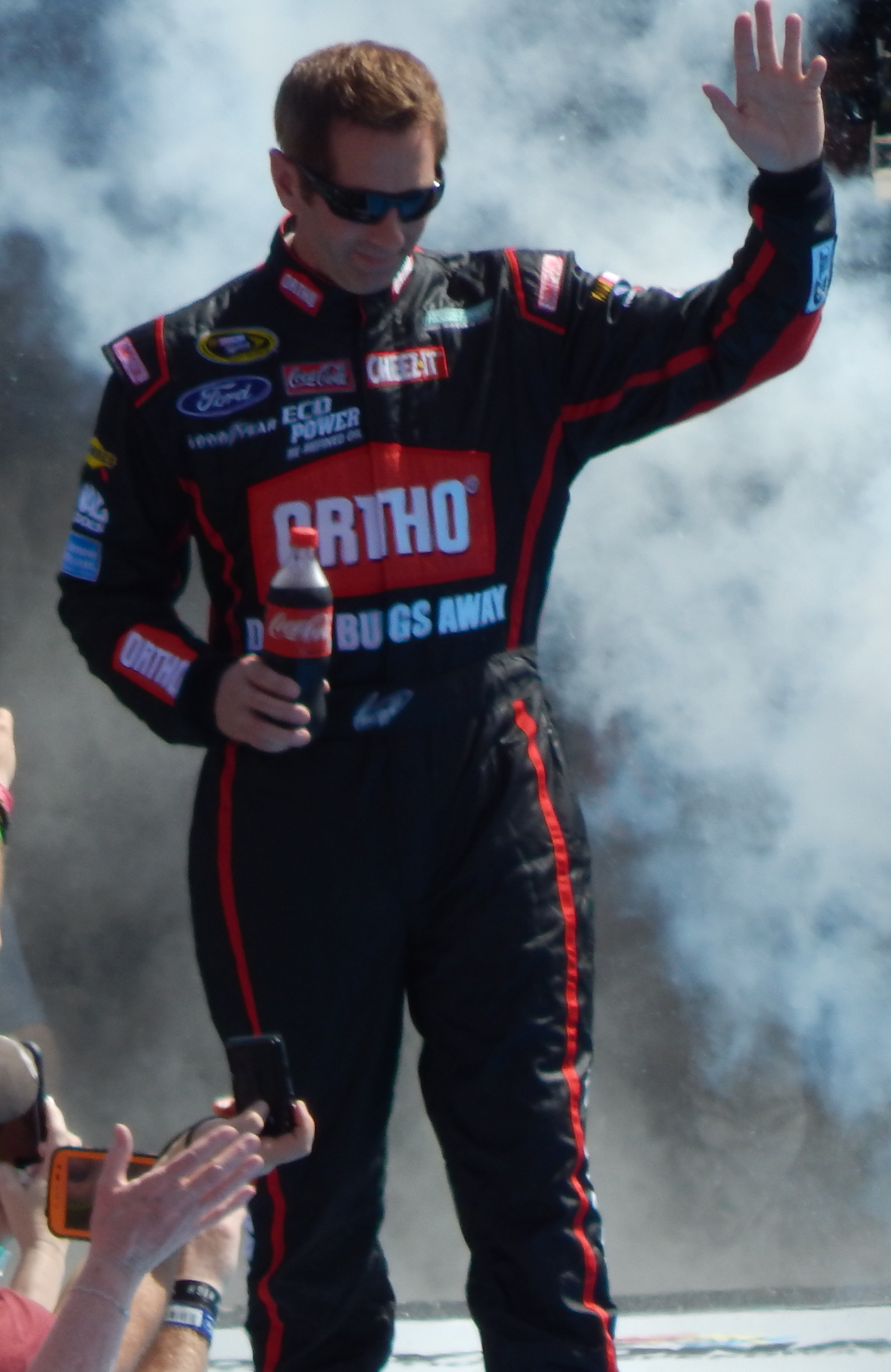
Greg Biffle, seen here at the 2015 Daytona 500, advanced his way into the All-Star Race by winning the first segment.

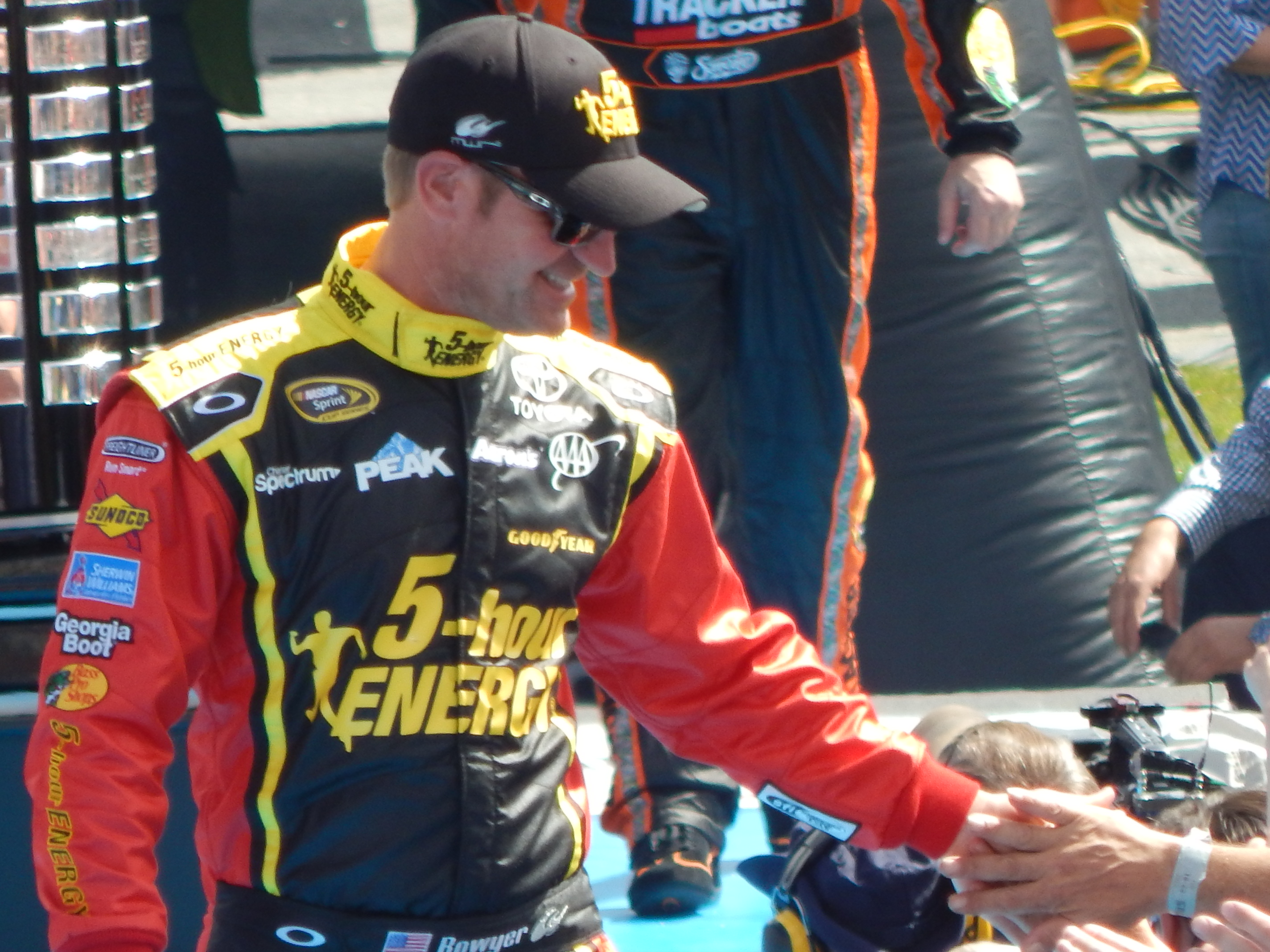
Clint Bowyer, seen here at the 2015 Daytona 500, advanced into the All-Star Race after winning the second segment.

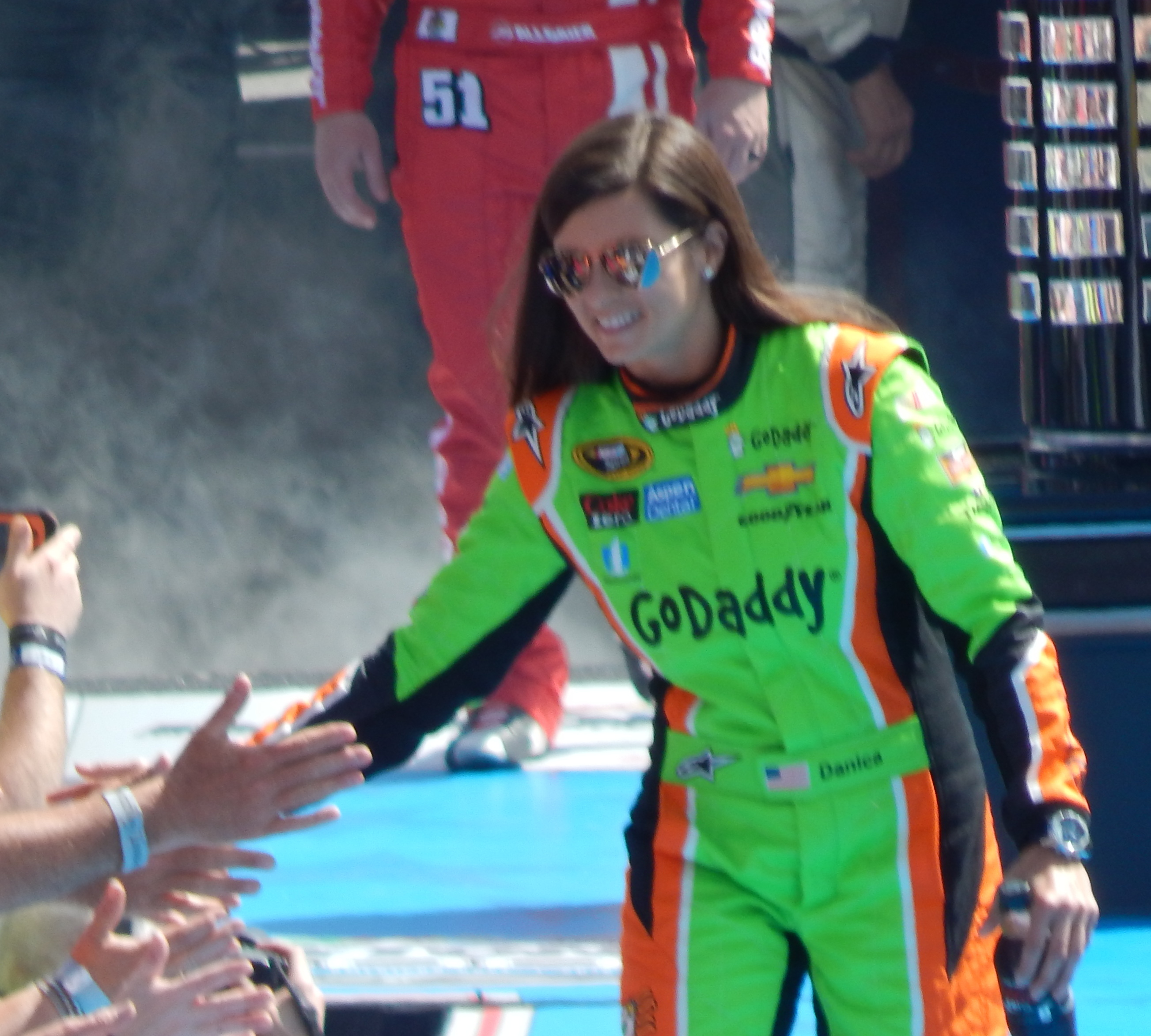
Danica Patrick, seen here at the 2015 Daytona 500, advanced to the All-Star Race after winning the fan vote.

Pos	No.	Driver	Team	Manufacturer	Segment		Laps
Pos	No.	Driver	Team	Manufacturer	1	2	Laps
1	15	Clint Bowyer	Michael Waltrip Racing	Toyota	2	1	40
2	27	Paul Menard	Richard Childress Racing	Chevrolet	3	2	40
3	78	Martin Truex Jr.	Furniture Row Racing	Chevrolet	7	3	40
4	9	Sam Hornish Jr.	Richard Petty Motorsports	Ford	14	4	40
5	25	Chase Elliott	Hendrick Motorsports	Chevrolet	8	5	40
6	3	Austin Dillon	Richard Childress Racing	Chevrolet	4	6	40
7	6	Trevor Bayne	Roush Fenway Racing	Ford	17	7	40
8	51	Justin Allgaier	HScott Motorsports	Chevrolet	12	8	40
9	10	Danica Patrick	Stewart–Haas Racing	Chevrolet	10	9	40
10	13	Casey Mears	Germain Racing	Chevrolet	11	10	40
11	55	David Ragan	Michael Waltrip Racing	Toyota	5	11	40
12	95	Michael McDowell	Leavine Family Racing	Ford	13	12	40
13	38	David Gilliland	Front Row Motorsports	Ford	18	13	40
14	35	Cole Whitt	Front Row Motorsports	Ford	21	14	40
15	83	Matt DiBenedetto (R)	BK Racing	Toyota	19	15	40
16	26	Jeb Burton (R)	BK Racing	Toyota	23	16	40
17	98	Josh Wise	Phil Parsons Racing	Ford	17	40	40
18	23	J. J. Yeley	BK Racing	Toyota	22	18	40
19	30	Jeff Green	The Motorsports Group	Chevrolet	24	19	40
20	33	Alex Kennedy (R)	Hillman-Circle Sport LLC	Chevrolet	25	20	40
21	66	Tanner Berryhill (R)	Premium Motorsports	Chevrolet	27	21	38
22	62	Brendan Gaughan	Premium Motorsports	Chevrolet	26	22	38
23	17	Ricky Stenhouse Jr.	Roush Fenway Racing	Ford	9	23	39
24	42	Kyle Larson	Chip Ganassi Racing	Chevrolet	6	24	38
25	46	Michael Annett	HScott Motorsports	Chevrolet	28	26	34
26	7	Alex Bowman	Tommy Baldwin Racing	Chevrolet	15	26	22
27	40	Landon Cassill	Hillman-Circle Sport LLC	Chevrolet	16	27	20
28	32	Mike Bliss	Go FAS Racing	Ford	29	28	6
29	16	Greg Biffle	Roush Fenway Racing	Ford	1	DNS	20

== Qualifying (All-Star Race) ==
Denny Hamlin won the pole for the All-Star Race with a cumulative time of 1:51.227 and a speed of 145.648 mph (234.398 km/h). Like the Kansas race the previous week, the qualifying session started on Fox News Channel, due to a Major League Baseball game running long, the qualifying session went on Fox Sports 1 13 minutes later.

=== All-Star Race qualifying results ===
Pos	No.	Driver	Team	Manufacturer	Time	Speed
1	11	Denny Hamlin	Joe Gibbs Racing	Toyota	1:51.227	145.648
2	16	Greg Biffle	Roush Fenway Racing	Ford	1:52.000	144.643
3	2	Brad Keselowski	Team Penske	Ford	1:52.228	144.349
4	15	Clint Bowyer	Michael Waltrip Racing	Toyota	1:52.300	144.256
5	5	Kasey Kahne	Hendrick Motorsports	Chevrolet	1:52.794	143.625
6	10	Danica Patrick (Note: Danica Patrick changed engines after practice and started the race from the rear of the field.)	Stewart–Haas Racing	Chevrolet	1:52.893	143.499
7	88	Dale Earnhardt Jr.	Hendrick Motorsports	Chevrolet	1:53.121	143.209
8	43	Aric Almirola	Richard Petty Motorsports	Ford	1:53.220	143.084
9	24	Jeff Gordon	Hendrick Motorsports	Chevrolet	1:53.223	143.080
10	19	Carl Edwards	Joe Gibbs Racing	Toyota	1:53.382	142.880
11	22	Joey Logano	Team Penske	Ford	1:53.664	142.525
12	48	Jimmie Johnson	Hendrick Motorsports	Chevrolet	1:53.706	142.473
13	47	A. J. Allmendinger	JTG Daugherty Racing	Chevrolet	1:53.764	142.400
14	1	Jamie McMurray	Chip Ganassi Racing	Chevrolet	1:54.024	142.075
15	14	Tony Stewart	Stewart–Haas Racing	Chevrolet	1:54.144	141.926
16	41	Kurt Busch	Stewart–Haas Racing	Chevrolet	1:54.934	140.950
17	20	Matt Kenseth	Joe Gibbs Racing	Toyota	1:55.578	140.165
18	31	Ryan Newman	Richard Childress Racing	Chevrolet	1:57.880	137.428
19	18	Kyle Busch	Joe Gibbs Racing	Toyota	2:00.466	134.748
20	4	Kevin Harvick	Stewart–Haas Racing	Chevrolet	2:04.769	129.840

== All-Star Race ==
=== Segment 1 ===
The Sprint All-Star Race was scheduled to start at 9:16 p.m., but started at 9:42 p.m. when Denny Hamlin led the field to the green flag. He jumped to a lead of two seconds over Kasey Kahne in five laps. But by lap 10, Kahne has cut the gap to half a second. He finally passed Hamlin on the outside in turn 2 to take the lead on lap 16. Exiting turn 4, Greg Biffle slapped the wall with five laps to go in segment 1. He slammed the wall a second time in the final lap of the first segment. The first caution of the race flew on lap 26 to complete the first segment. While pitting in the first four segments is optional, all the cars opted to pit at the end of the first segment. Brad Keselowski exited pit road with the lead. To add to Biffle's woes, he was tagged for speeding on pit road and restarted the race from the tail-end of the field. The effect, however, was moot because he was already last in the running order.

=== Segment 2 ===
The race restarted on lap 26. Dale Earnhardt Jr. spun the tires on the restart and just dropped like a rock down the running order. Kurt Busch got underneath Keselowski to briefly take the lead on lap 34. Keselowski would take back the lead the next lap. Busch attempted to go by him the next lap, but got loose exiting turn 2 and lost ground to him. While Kurt reeled in Brad down to three tenths of a second, Keselowski would cross the line first in the second segment. The second caution of the race flew to end segment 2. Once again, all the cars opted to pit under the caution. This time, Jamie McMurray left with the lead. Greg Biffle, Kyle Busch and Denny Hamlin were all tagged for speeding on pit road and restarted the race from the tail-end of the field.

=== Segment 3 ===
The race restarted on lap 51. McMurray didn't get a good start and was about spun out by Joey Logano. This allowed teammate Brad Keselowski to retake the lead. Danica Patrick took her car to the garage on lap 60 after the left-front hub of her car burned out. Kyle Busch made an unscheduled stop for a tire vibration on lap 63. The culprit was a loose left-rear wheel. Kevin Harvick made a charge at the lead, but Brad Keselowski was able to lead the entire third segment as the third caution of the race flew to conclude segment 3. Everybody pitted under this caution. Matt Kenseth exited with the lead. Greg Biffle and Tony Stewart were tagged for speeding on pit road and Dale Earnhardt Jr. was tagged for his crew being over the wall too soon. All three restarted the race from the tail-end of the field.

=== Segment 4 ===
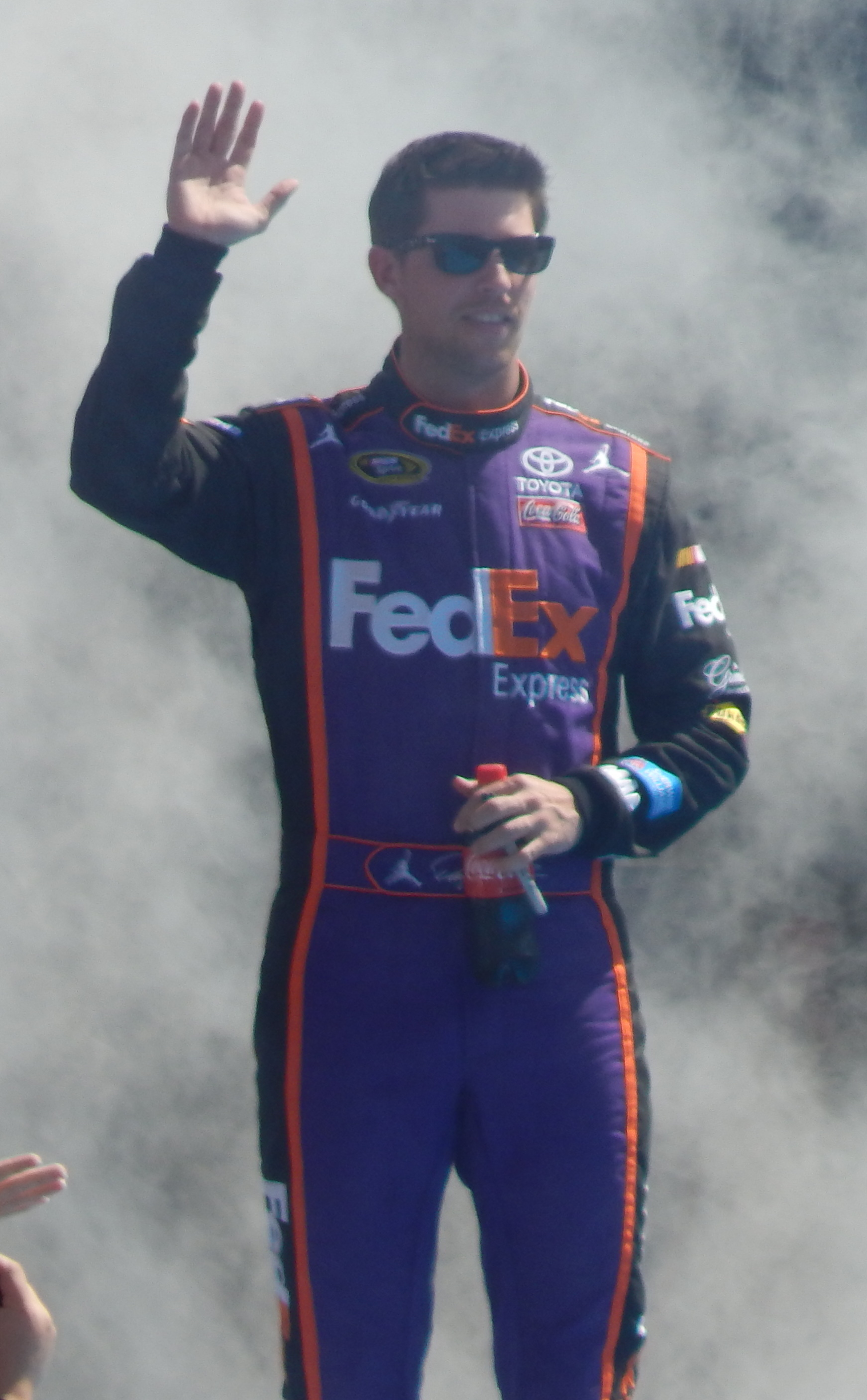
Denny Hamlin, seen here at the 2015 Daytona 500, scored the victory in the Sprint All-Star Race.

The race restarted on lap 76. Denny Hamlin beat his teammate to take the lead on lap 77. He, however, was no match on two tires to Kurt Busch on four who took the lead on lap 78. He would hold the lead to the conclusion of the fourth segment as the fourth caution of the race flew. Brad Keselowski led the field down pit road for the mandatory four tire pit stop. Denny Hamlin exited with the lead. Carl Edwards and Brad Keselowski were tagged for speeding on pit road and restarted the race from the tail-end of the field.

=== 10 laps to go ===
The race restarted with 10 laps to go. While Hamlin was unable to pull away from the field as had been the norm in the last few years, he was able to hold off a hard charging Kevin Harvick to score the victory in the Sprint All-Star Race. It was the fifth straight year that the winner of the race restarted either first or second in the final 10 laps. "In the middle part of the race, I thought we were out to lunch," Hamlin said. "With 50 (laps) to go, I didn’t see this coming. But the pit crew knocked it out of the park – a primetime, under-pressure performance that won us the race. Then, we had to hold off the "4" (Harvick), which we haven’t been able to do the last two years. Everything came together perfectly for that last 10 laps." Jeff Gordon finished fourth in his 22nd and final All-Star Race. Kyle Busch finished sixth in his first Sprint Cup Series race since Homestead last November. "I felt like I got of the car after 100 laps and I'm fine," Busch said. "Am I going to die out after 200 or 300? I don't know, but the plan is to the full distance." After restarting the race from the tail-end of the field, Brad Keselowski worked his way to a ninth-place finish.

=== All-Star Race results ===
Pos	No.	Driver	Team	Manufacturer	Segment					Laps
Pos	No.	Driver	Team	Manufacturer	1	2	3	4	5	Laps
1	11	Denny Hamlin	Joe Gibbs Racing	Toyota	2	8	13	3	1	110
2	4	Kevin Harvick	Stewart–Haas Racing	Chevrolet	10	6	2	2	2	110
3	41	Kurt Busch	Stewart–Haas Racing	Chevrolet	5	2	3	1	3	110
4	24	Jeff Gordon	Hendrick Motorsports	Chevrolet	6	3	6	7	4	110
5	20	Matt Kenseth	Joe Gibbs Racing	Toyota	13	9	7	10	5	110
6	18	Kyle Busch	Joe Gibbs Racing	Toyota	14	7	19	9	6	110
7	5	Kasey Kahne	Hendrick Motorsports	Chevrolet	1	5	5	5	7	110
8	22	Joey Logano	Team Penske	Ford	7	4	4	16	8	110
9	2	Brad Keselowski	Team Penske	Ford	4	1	1	4	9	110
10	88	Dale Earnhardt Jr.	Hendrick Motorsports	Chevrolet	3	12	16	14	10	110
11	47	A. J. Allmendinger	JTG Daugherty Racing	Chevrolet	16	10	12	8	11	110
12	15	Clint Bowyer	Michael Waltrip Racing	Toyota	11	11	10	19	12	110
13	16	Greg Biffle	Roush Fenway Racing	Ford	8	20	17	17	13	110
14	43	Aric Almirola	Richard Petty Motorsports	Ford	18	19	18	18	14	110
15	48	Jimmie Johnson	Hendrick Motorsports	Chevrolet	9	13	9	12	15	110
16	1	Jamie McMurray	Chip Ganassi Racing	Chevrolet	12	14	11	15	16	110
17	19	Carl Edwards	Joe Gibbs Racing	Toyota	15	17	8	6	17	110
18	31	Ryan Newman	Richard Childress Racing	Chevrolet	19	18	17	11	18	110
19	14	Tony Stewart	Stewart–Haas Racing	Chevrolet	20	15	14	13	19	110
20	10	Danica Patrick	Stewart–Haas Racing	Chevrolet	17	16	20	20	20	78

== Media ==
=== Television ===
Fox Sports covered their 15th All-Star Race. Mike Joy, Larry McReynolds and 1985 race winner Darrell Waltrip had the call in the booth for the race. Jamie Little, Chris Neville and Matt Yocum handled the pit road duties for the television side. Like Kansas, coverage was briefly moved to FOX News Channel due to MLB Coverage on Fox Sports 1 running long. This time, FOX News Channel broadcast the first few cars of qualifying. Once the MLB Game ended, both channels briefly simulcasted Qualifying until Kasey Kahne qualified. Coverage then switched to Fox Sports 1.

Fox Sports 1
Booth announcers	Pit reporters
Lap-by-lap: Mike Joy; Color-commentator: Larry McReynolds; Color commentator: Darrell Waltrip	Jamie Little; Chris Neville; Matt Yocum

=== Radio ===
MRN has carried the All-Star Race since 1985 and had the radio call for the race, which was simulcast on Sirius XM NASCAR Radio. Joe Moore, Jeff Striegle and 1989 race winner Rusty Wallace called the race in the booth when the field was racing down the front stretch. Dave Moody called the race from a scaffold outside of turn 2 when the field was racing through turns 1 and 2. Kyle Rickey called the race from a billboard outside of turn 3 when the field was racing through turns 3 and 4. Alex Hayden, Winston Kelley and Steve Post worked pit road for MRN.

MRN
Booth announcers	Turn announcers	Pit reporters
Lead announcer: Joe Moore; Announcer: Jeff Striegle; Announcer: Rusty Wallace	Turns 1 & 2: Dave Moody; Turns 3 & 4: Kyle Rickey	Alex Hayden; Winston Kelley; Steve Post

== Note ==
Previous race: 2015 SpongeBob SquarePants 400	Sprint Cup Series; 2015 season	Next race: 2015 Coca-Cola 600
