= Pit stop =

Mid race maintenance stops in autosport

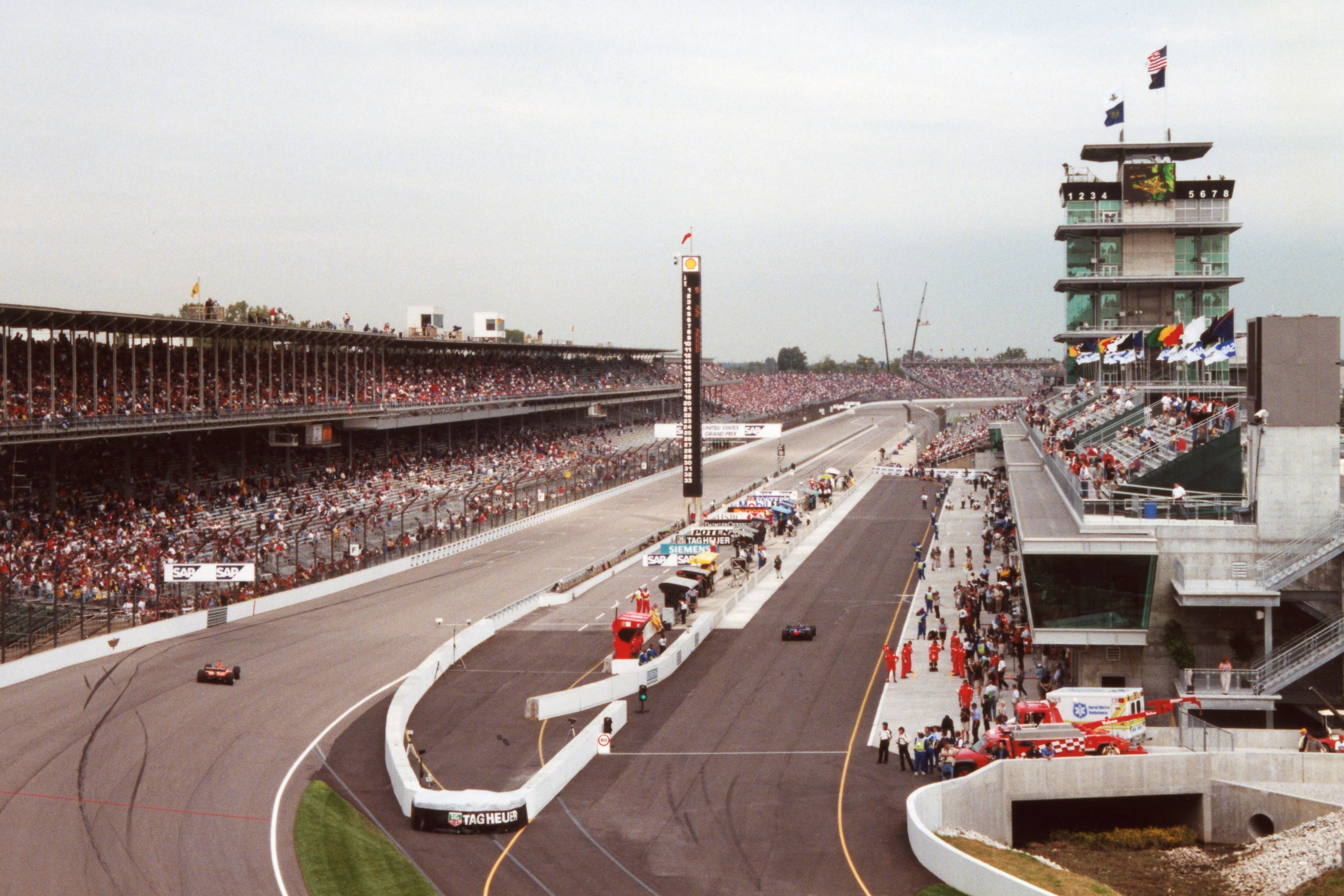
Indianapolis Motor Speedway Formula One pit lane and garages (right) adjacent to the oval racing lane.

In motorsports, a pit stop is a pause for refuelling, new tyres, repairs, mechanical adjustments, a driver change, as a penalty, or any combination of the above. These stops occur in an area called the pits, most commonly accessed via a pit lane which runs parallel to the start/finish straightaway of the track and is connected to it at each end. Along this lane is a row of garages (typically one per team or car) outside which the work is done in a pit box. Pit stop work is carried out by the pit crew of up to twenty mechanics in Formula One, depending on the series regulations, while the driver often waits in the vehicle (except where a driver change is involved or in motorbike racing).

The term is also used generically to describe a short break in a journey or road trip.

== Location and terminology ==
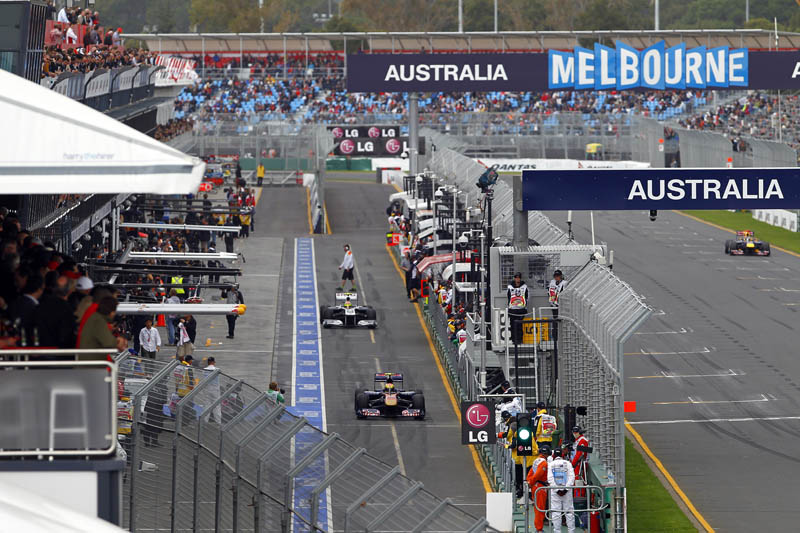
Pit lane at the 2011 Australian Grand Prix

Depending on the circuit, the garage may be located on pit lane or in a separate area.

In most series, the order of the teams' pit boxes is assigned by points standings, race results, or previous qualifying results before the start of the race. In NASCAR and in INDYCAR's Indianapolis 500, typically pit assignments are made after qualifying, with the fastest qualifiers choosing their pit stall first.

Most North American circuits feature a pit lane with a number of pit stalls (typically 30–50) and a pit wall that separates the pit lane from the infield, with the garages (if used) on a separate road in the infield. In races where there are different series racing together, each series has its own separate garage or are parked in their own area. Circuits in other parts of the world (used in Formula One) typically have the individual garages open directly onto the pit lane through the team's assigned pit box. In American English, it is common to drop the definite article and just refer to "pit road", whereas in British English one would always refer to "the pit lane". A further difference is that in British English, the term "pit box" is universally used, whereas in American English, one would say "pit stall". In NASCAR, a pit box is a tool (see below), though there is a definitive term used for them.

== Purpose ==
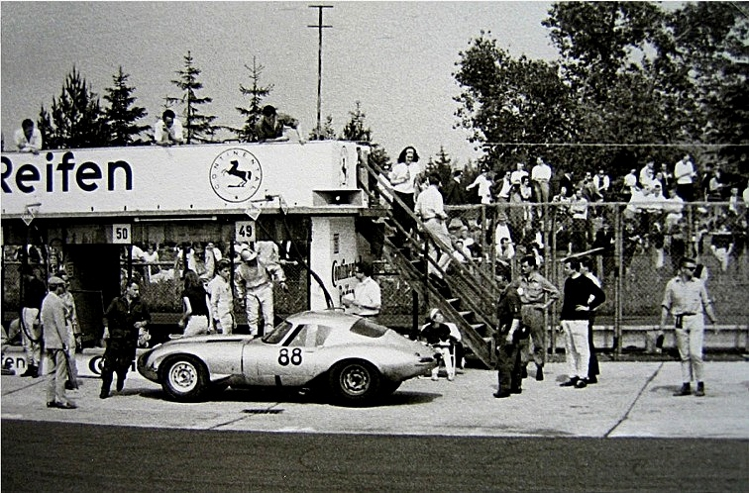
Pit stop in 1964 at Nürburgring

When it is permitted, refuelling is often an important purpose of a pit stop. Carrying fuel slows down a vehicle and there is often a limit on the size of the fuel tank, so many races require multiple stops for fuel to complete the race distance at a minimum time.

Changing tyres is also common, since they often degrade so quickly that they don’t last a full race. In addition, softer tyres can produce wear faster but provide more grip while hard tyres provide extra durability against tyre wear but often comes at the expense of speed. Tyres may be also replaced to adapt to many changing weather conditions as racing slicks and rain tyres provide better grip on dry and wet conditions respectively.

Teams will aim for each of their vehicles to pit following a planned schedule, with the number of stops determined by many factors, such as fuel capacity, tyre lifespan, and the trade-off between time lost in the pits versus time gained on the track due to the benefits of pit stops. Choosing the optimum pit strategy of how many stops to make and when to make them is crucial in having a successful race. It is also important for teams to take competitors' strategies into account when planning pit stops. Competitors may decide do an unscheduled stop if the car is damaged, or to avoid being held up behind a competitor where overtaking is difficult or risky.

An extended stop, such as for a repair or a crew mistake, can be very costly for a driver's chance of success, because while they are stopped for service, competitors remaining on the track are gaining time on them. For this reason, the pit crew often undergo intensive training to perform operations such as tyre changes as quickly as possible. In Formula 1, tyres are often changed in under three seconds.

== General strategy ==
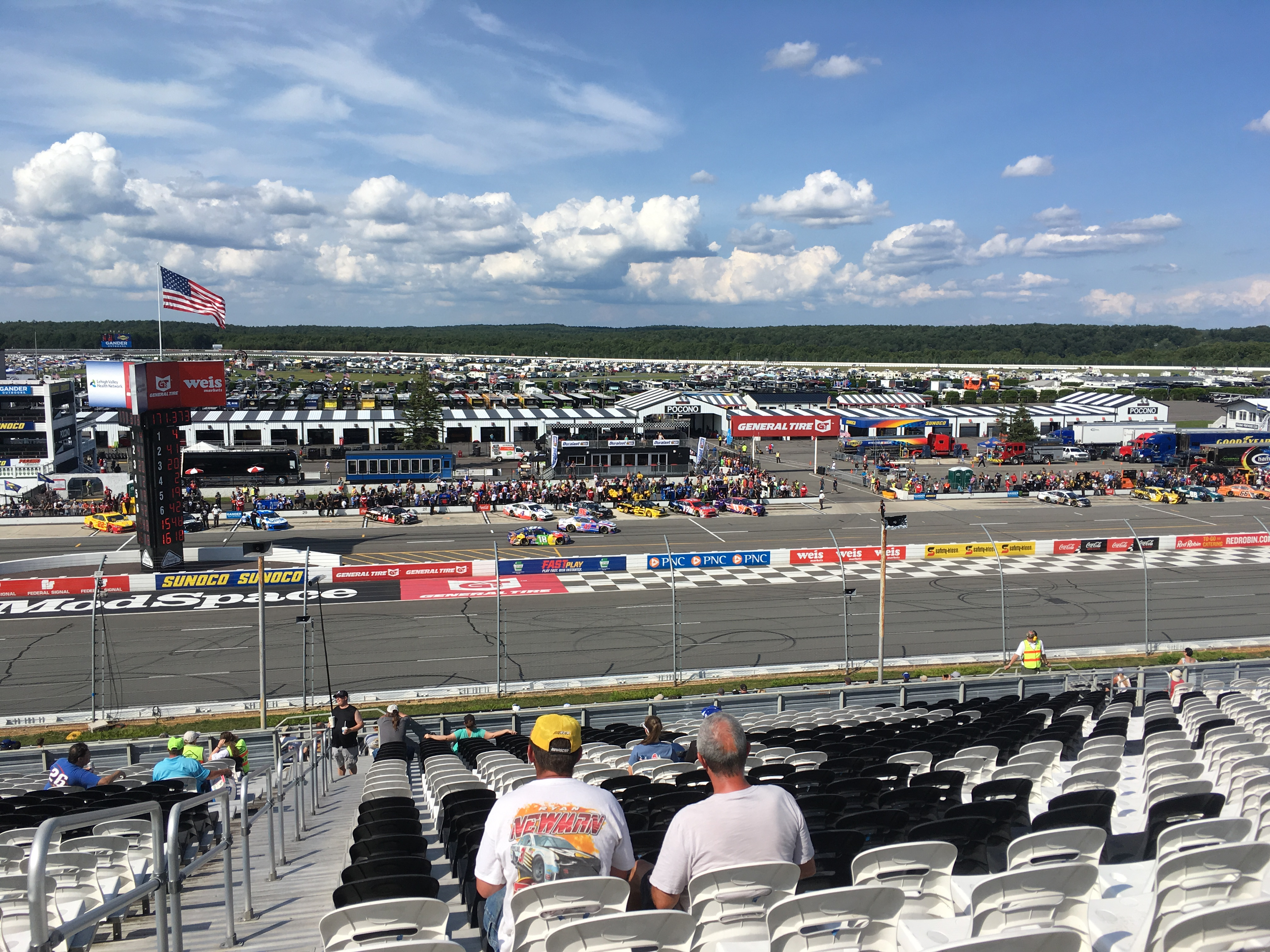
Pit lane at Pocono Raceway

In any racing series that permits scheduled pit stops, pit strategy becomes one of the most important features of the race; this is because a race car travelling at 100 miles per hour (160 kilometres per hour) will travel approximately 150 feet (45 metres) per second. During a ten-second pit stop, a car's competitors will gain approximately one-quarter-mile (450 metres) over the stopped car.

However, the car that made the additional pit stop will run faster on the race track than cars that did not make the stop, both because it can carry a smaller amount (and thus lower weight) of fuel, and will also have less wear on its tyres, providing more traction and allowing higher speeds in the corners. In racing series where teams have their choice of different compound tyres, the lower tyre wear may be enough to allow the team to choose to use a tyre with a softer rubber compound that provides increased grip at the expense of faster wear; going longer between stops may even cause enough wear on the softer tyre to cause the tyres to fail.

Because of this, race teams plan a pit strategy prior to the start of every race. This is a schedule for each car's planned pit stops during the race, and takes into account factors such as rate of fuel consumption, weight of fuel, cornering speed with each available tyre compound, rate of tyre wear, the effect of tyre wear on cornering speed, the length of pit road and the track's pit road speed limit, and even expected changes in weather and lighting conditions. The pit strategy does not just include a schedule of when pit stops will happen; it also includes what service and adjustments are scheduled for each pit stop, particularly in endurance racing, where scheduled changes of wear-limited parts such as brake pads may be planned for specific points during the race. The pit strategy is calculated carefully so that the amount of time to be "given away" to other competitors in pit stops is balanced by the time gained while on the track, resulting, in expectation, in the shortest possible time to cover the scheduled distance.

However, a team's pit strategy is not a fixed, immutable thing; it is subject to change during the race to take into account the unpredictable events that happen in every race. In road racing, for example, if the weather changes from dry to rain, teams will be forced to recalculate their pit strategy based on the unscheduled stop to change from dry-weather "slick" tyres to treaded wet-weather tyres. Safety car periods often see mass pit stops by many teams, hoping to take advantage of the slowed pace to reduce the ground lost to other teams while making pit stops; this forces teams that do so to immediately recalculate their pit strategy to optimize it for the remaining race distance after the stop.

Even when a team chooses not to take advantage of the opportunity to stop during a full-course caution, it can still result in significant changes to pit strategy; under caution, the cars run at a reduced speed that results in greatly reduced tyre wear and fuel burn for a distance travelled. Depending on the circumstances, this may be enough for a team to gain more by choosing not to pit, hoping that the reduced fuel burn and tyre wear will allow them to make one pit stop fewer than the other teams, allowing them to gain distance and time on their opponents. At tracks noted for frequent full-course cautions, teams may even plan their entire race strategy around this, using a suspension and aerodynamic setup suited to short sprints instead of extended runs to gain positions in the short bursts of green-flag racing, and planning their pit strategy on the assumption that cautions will extend their fuel mileage and tyre wear enough to make fewer stops than would otherwise be needed to complete the race distance.

== Services performed ==
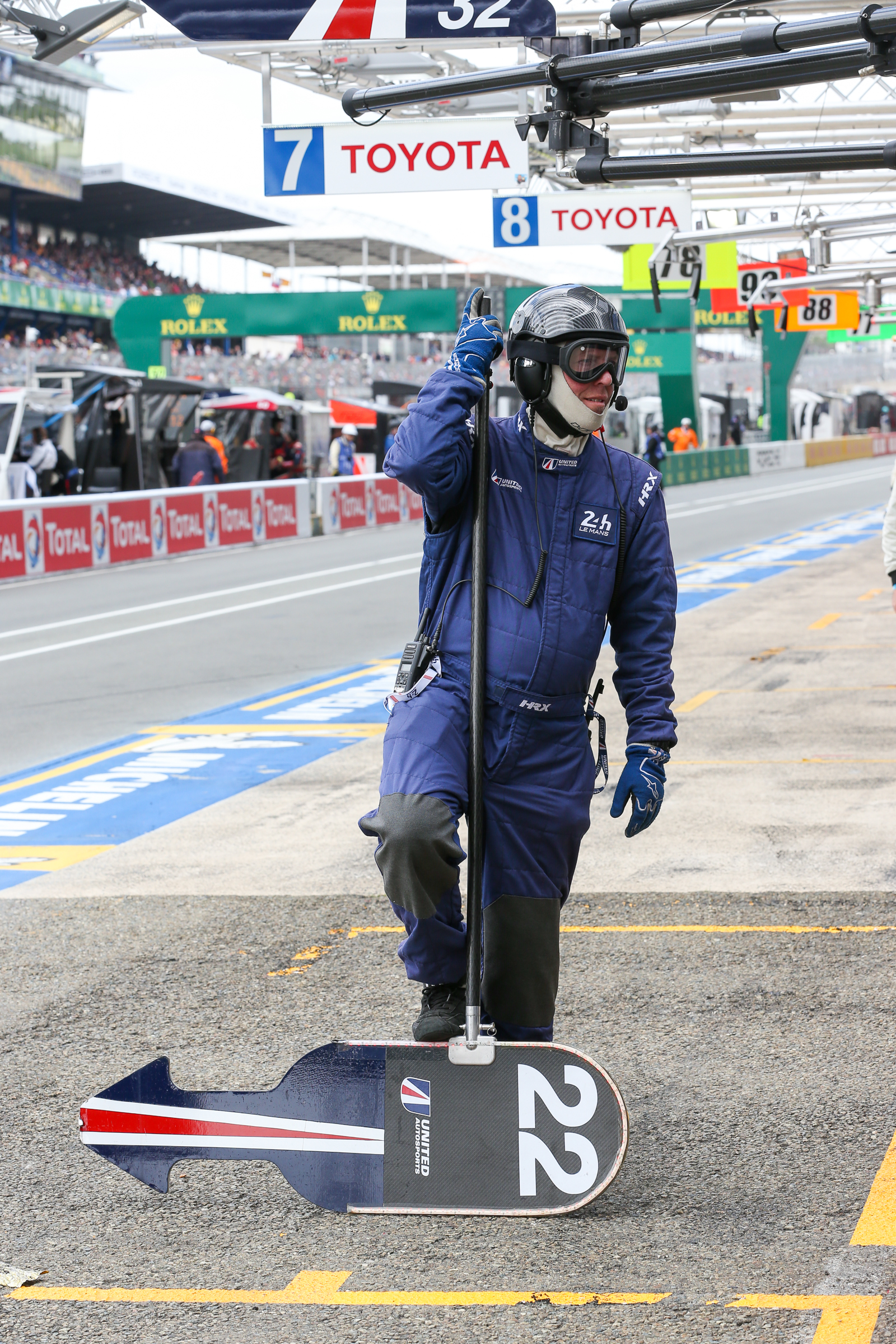
Veteran pit crew member Jim Hersey holding pit 'lollipop' sign to signal the driver (Circuit de la Sarthe, 2019)

During a scheduled pit stop, the team's pit crew services the vehicle as quickly as possible, completing a number of different services. The most common services performed are refuelling (where permitted) and changing tyres.

Other services performed in routine pit stops include removing debris from radiator air intakes, cleaning the windscreen, and making adjustments to tyre pressure, suspension settings, and aerodynamic devices to optimize the vehicle's performance for the current conditions. In endurance racing, scheduled driver changes and brake pad replacements are also considered "routine" service when done as part of a scheduled pit stop.

An unscheduled pit stop may see other services performed; because unscheduled stops are often due to damage or mechanical problems, they may include emergency repairs and replacement of parts.

In some forms of racing, a team may be ordered to bring a vehicle into the pits as a penalty and either drive through the pit lane at the maximum permitted speed or remain stationary in their pit box for a specified period of time. During this time no services can be performed.

== Records ==
Series	Time	Driver	Team	Race
Formula One	1.80	Lando Norris	McLaren	2023 Qatar Grand Prix
NASCAR	8.02	Denny Hamlin	Joe Gibbs Racing	2025 Coca-Cola 600

== Formula One ==
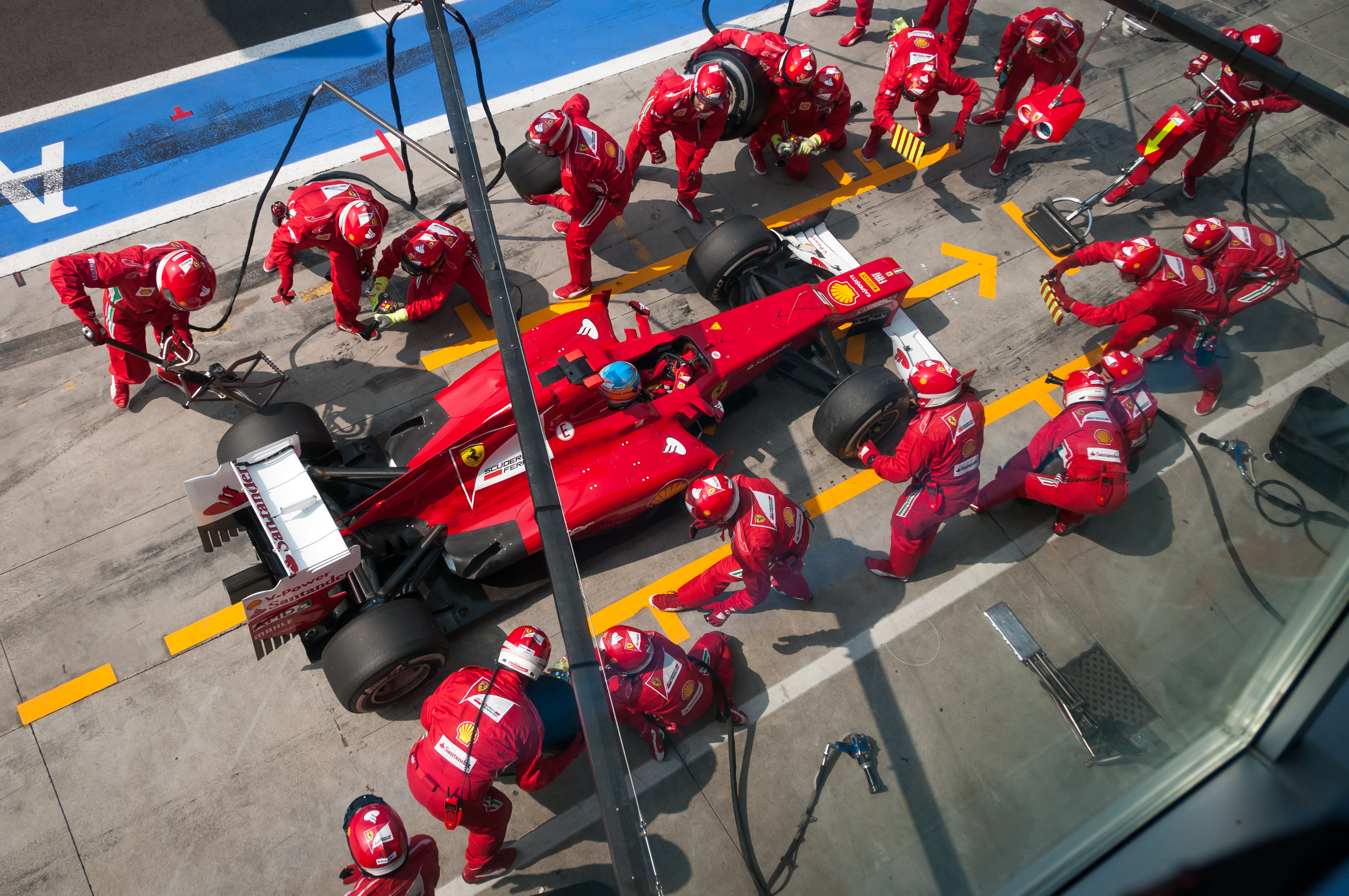
Fernando Alonso's Ferrari pit crew carry out a pit stop at the 2012 Italian Grand Prix

In Formula One, mid-race refuelling has been banned since 2010, and cars make pit stops with the primary purpose of changing tyres. Teams sometimes also make adjustments to the front and rear wings and perform minor repairs, most commonly replacing the nose and front wing assembly. A pit stop typically takes approximately 3 seconds to complete. McLaren holds the current world record for the fastest pit stop, with a 1.80-second stop performed at the 2023 Qatar Grand Prix on Lando Norris. Typical pit strategies generally call for one or two scheduled stops, rarely three or four, depending on the circuit. The drives between pit stops are commonly known as 'stints'.

When the car is approximately one lap away from making its stop, the team's pit crew will set up fresh tyres and all needed pit equipment. Because of the overhead pneumatic rig, the team may have all pit mechanics in position before the car's arrival, except for the rear jack man.

Unlike almost all other forms of racing that feature routine pit stops, Formula One rules limit teams to a single pit crew for the mandatory two cars entered. Most other racing series that feature routine pit stops permit each car its own pit stall and crew. Therefore, teams must stagger their pit schedules so that only one of their two cars is in the pits at any given time; otherwise, one car must wait for the other car to finish services. However, with proper timing or in special conditions (for example, in the period immediately after the safety car being called out), it is possible for teams to pit both cars on the same lap without losing significant time; this is known as the 'double stack' strategy. This allows both of the team's drivers to race on equally fresh tyres, preventing either from having an advantage over the other, and helps the team hide the relative performance between two cars to other teams when only one car is in the pits.

One strategy commonly used in Formula One pit stops is the 'undercut' involving two cars battling for track position. In this strategy, the car behind makes an earlier pit stop than the leading car; if successful, the car behind should be able to utilize the advantage of having fresh tyres to reduce the lead of the car they are attempting to overtake. If the gap between the two cars is reduced to less than the time lost in a pit stop, when the leading car pits, the leading car will exit the pits behind the car which pitted first. This strategy is especially effective when the leading car is stuck in traffic and/or if the car behind has clear track to push on, but can be negated if the car behind gets stuck in traffic after their early pit stop or is unable to drive fast enough to neutralize the advantage of the leading car. Similarly, there is the reverse (but less common) strategy of the 'overcut', where the leading car stays out on their older tyres longer and laps fast enough to maintain or even extend their advantage over the car behind—this strategy may be successful if the leading car's tyres are still in good shape when the car behind pits, sufficiently so that the leading car can push without being overly limited by tyre degradation, or if the car behind gets stuck in traffic, thus negating their ability to utilise their fresher tyres to their advantage.

=== Refuelling ===
Refuelling, now banned in F1 races, was permitted until 1983, and then again from the 1994 season to the 2009 season. During this period, a pit stop involved about twenty mechanics, with the aim of completing the stop as quickly as possible. Stops generally lasted for six to twelve seconds, depending upon how much fuel was put into the car. However, if there was a problem, such as a fuel pump failing or the engine stalling, or repairs having to be made, it could take much longer. Cars were fuelled at a rate of more than 12 litres per second. This was accomplished by a fairly complex closed system that pumped air out of the car's fuel tank as the fuel was being pumped in.

Since fuel was a significant portion of a car's weight, teams varied the amount of fuel loaded into a car at any given stop (and prior to the race) and thus vary the number of pit stops. The most common strategies seen were one-stop and two-stop strategies; two-stop strategies were employed to increase the car's speed/improve lap times to catch cars ahead, whereas one-stop strategies were used to gain time and track position to cars ahead with the advantage of one fewer pit stop. However, teams could and sometimes did opt for unorthodox pit strategies with multiple (3+) pit stops, as was employed by Ferrari and Michael Schumacher with four stops at the 2004 French Grand Prix, which he eventually won.

As refuelling was a potentially hazardous situation, the mechanics wore fire-resistant multi-layer suits and flame-resistant gloves, long underwear, balaclava, socks and shoes, which had to meet the guidelines set by FIA Standard 8856-2000.

=== Formula One pit crew roles ===
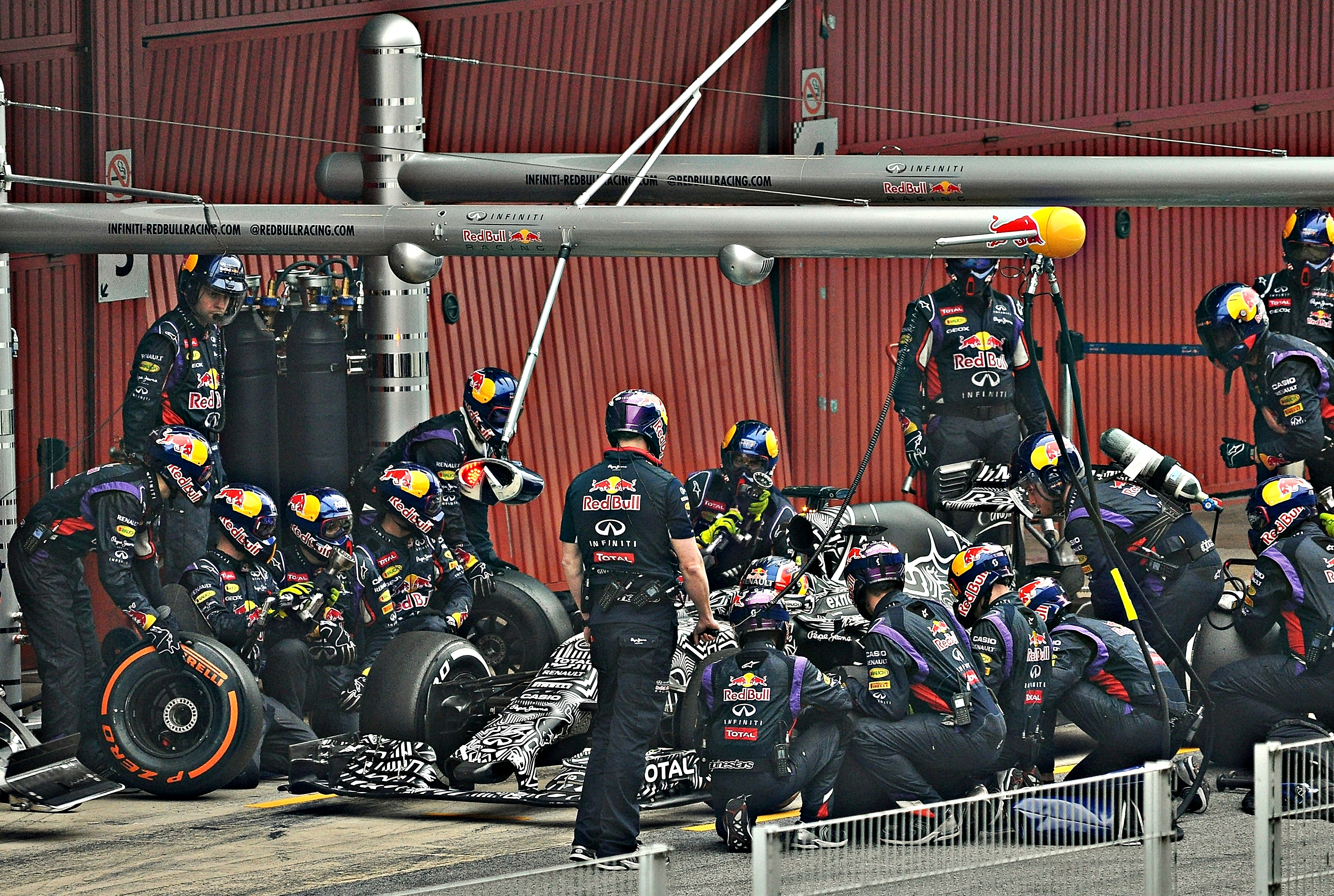
The Red Bull Racing team practicing their pit stops.

- Four wheel-gunners or tyre changers, one for each wheel/corner of the car, use a pneumatic wrench ("tyre gun") to remove the car's single locking lug nut from each tyre then reinstall it on the new tyre.
- Eight tyre carriers are used (four each of wheel-off and wheel-on), two for each wheel/corner of the car, one to remove the old tyre from the car and one to put the new tyre in place.
- Two stabilisers stabilise the car on each side at the middle of the car.
- The front wing men, if necessary, adjust the front wing angle (to provide more/less downforce) and/or change the entire front wing (in case of damage sustained during the race).
- The front and rear jack men use lever-type jacks to lift the car and permit the changing of tyres during the pit stop.
  - The job of the front jack man is generally considered the most hazardous of the entire pit crew, as it requires standing directly in front of the car as it enters its pit box. Mechanics in this role have been injured in the past when drivers have overshot/failed to brake in time for their pit box.
  - By contrast, due to the location of his duties directly behind the car, the rear jack man is the only team member not in his working position before the car enters its pit box.
- The fire extinguisher man stands ready with a hand-held fire extinguisher to put out any fires that may occur during a stop, at least long enough for the pit crew and driver to evacuate. This job became standard following Jos Verstappen's 1994 pit fire.
  - Sometimes, more than one pit crew member may perform this role if a car comes in for an unscheduled stop with mechanical issues involving a fire/excessive heat (e.g. overheating brakes).

==== Deprecated roles ====
- The lollipop man held the team's pit sign (nicknamed the "lollipop" for its circular shape, hence the name of the role), helping the driver identify his pit box on the pit lane and holding it in position during the stop to remind the driver to keep his brakes on while tyres are being changed, to remember to put the car in first gear once the jacks are lowered, and finally to signal the driver to leave the pit box once the pit stop was complete by raising the sign.
  - Nowadays, this role is carried out by a traffic light system—drivers drive into their team pit by memory or by watching the crews out on pit lane and are signaled to leave the pit box by a series of lights suspended over the driver's head in the pit box controlled from the garage.
- The refueling man managed the refueling system for the car, hooking it in place during the pit stop and disengaging it when refueling was complete.
  - With refueling having been banned in F1 from the 2010 season onwards, this role is no longer necessary as cars no longer refuel mid-race.
- The starter man stood ready with a starter tool to restart the car should the driver stall his engine during the pit stop.
  - Nowadays, as modern F1 cars have anti-stall systems, and also can be started by the driver independently if needed using the car's battery, this role is no longer necessary, unless a situation calls for a complete engine reset.

== Formula E ==
For its first four seasons, pit stops in Formula E served the primary purpose of changing cars—since FE cars did not yet contain the necessary electric charge to complete a full race, drivers needed to switch cars during the race. With the exception of repairing damaged tyres, no other mechanic services were allowed to be performed on the cars during the pit stop.

Prior to the 2017–18 season, the rule and scoring system in Formula E allowed for some unusual pit stop strategies. Previously, drivers scored one point for setting the fastest lap in the race regardless of finishing position (or whether they finished the race at all); hence, a driver with no chance at finishing in the point-scoring positions for whatever reason could switch cars, wait for the prematurely right moment to come out of the pits and set the fastest lap of the race. Notably, this was seen in the 2016 London ePrix, when championship contenders Sébastien Buemi and Lucas di Grassi utilised this strategy after their first lap crash rendered them otherwise unable to score points; Buemi ended up with the fastest lap, winning the Formula E 2016 drivers' championship as a direct result. For the 2017–18 season, Formula E's rules were amended to restrict the additional point for fastest lap to drivers finishing in the top 10 only, rendering the aforementioned strategy obsolete.

For Formula E's fifth season (2018–19), new cars were introduced which had batteries capable of completing the entire race distance; thus, such pit stops were no longer used during races, other than in the event of repairing damage. Plans are underway in Formula E to bring back pit stops in a race, but this time it would be not to change tyres or the car but to charge the car using high speed electric charging stations. The details are yet to be finalised.

== NASCAR ==
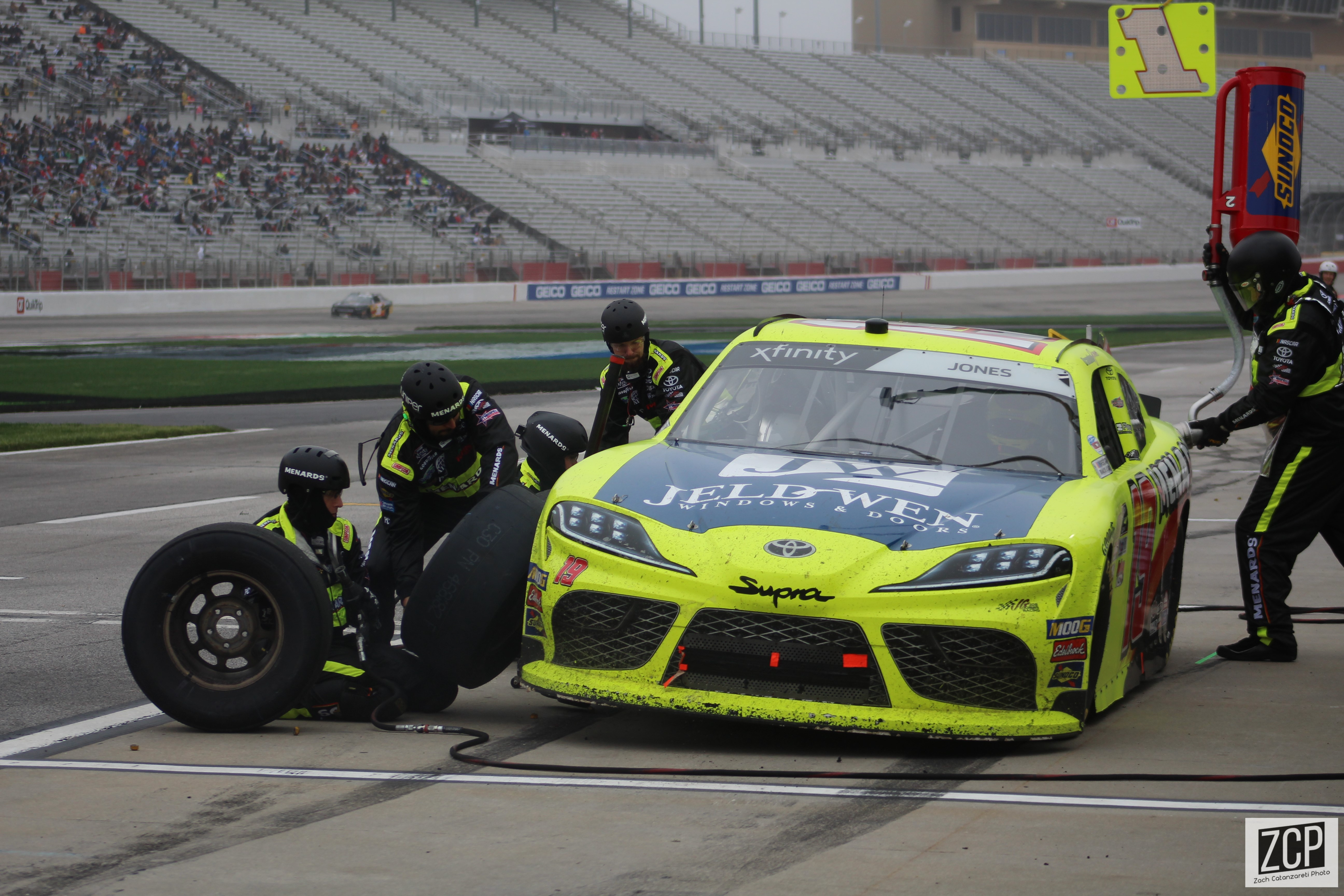
Brandon Jones' Joe Gibbs Racing pit crew of the NASCAR Xfinity Series execute a pit stop at Atlanta Motor Speedway in February 2019.

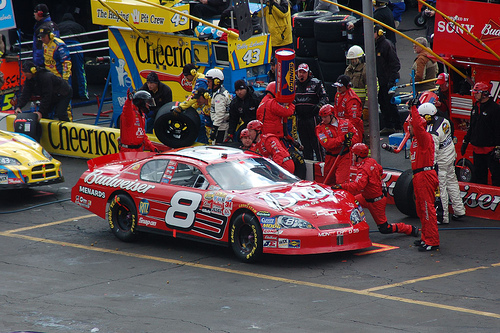
Dale Earnhardt Jr.'s #8 Budweiser Chevrolet Monte Carlo during a pit stop at Bristol Motor Speedway in 2006

Crew chiefs lead the pit crew during pit stops in addition to coaching the driver during the race. Pit crew members were once the mechanics on the racecar, but most teams feature individuals dedicated to pit stops only, and often former collegiate or professional athletes are used for pit stops. Former NFL player Tim Goad is regarded as the first former professional athlete involved in a pit crew, as a jackman. Nonetheless, some pit crew members work with the team in fabricating or designing the race cars during the week while training for their "pit job" on the weekends. Teams have built full training centers similar to that of professional athletes for their pit crews.

There are a number of penalties that can be incurred on a pit stop. The driver must keep the car below the pit road speed from the pit entrance to the pit exit; the speed limit is typically 35–55 mph (60–90 km/h), depending on the size of the track. Teams can be penalized if the car is serviced outside of the designated pit stall, if the car drives over an air hose, or if any of the old tires are not on the pit wall side (usually left) of the vehicle's centerline before the car leaves. The most common penalty for a pit infraction is a "drive-through": the driver must enter the pits again, under the green flag, and maintain the pit speed limit for the entire length of pit road. If a car stalls, the pit crew may provide a push start, but the car cannot be pushed beyond three pit stalls ahead of its own, or beyond the pit exit light and steward at the end of pit road.

Pit stops are timed from the moment the car stops in its pit stall until service is finished and the car leaves the stall. A pit stop for four tires and fuel can last 12 to 16 seconds, and a stop for two tires and fuel may take 5 to 7 seconds. Late in a race, a team may only need a small amount of fuel to make it to finish; this is called a "splash and go" and may take as little as 2 to 3 seconds. These times depend upon any suspension adjustments performed and the quality of the crew.

NASCAR Cup Series team pit strategies vary widely, depending on the track. Fuel is generally a more limiting factor than tire wear, and the phrase "fuel window" or "pit window" is used to indicate the maximum number of laps possible with a full load of fuel, assuming continuous green flag conditions and a small reserve. The window is used to calculate (or recalculate after a stop) the minimum number of pit stops required to complete the race. The road courses on the schedule may see as few as two scheduled stops; oval race tracks generally see between four and six scheduled stops. Races at short tracks such as Bristol Motor Speedway and Martinsville Speedway are short enough to be completed with only two scheduled stops for fuel, but teams plan on more stops due to rapid tire wear and significant loss of cornering speed on worn tires. If one team pits for tires and is considerably faster (between 1 and 3 seconds per lap), then teams will usually follow quickly to avoid losing time.

Pit strategy can play a significant role in the outcome of a NASCAR race, perhaps more so than other racing series. Under caution, most teams use similar strategies to avoid being caught alone, typically following the leader's decision to stay out or pit, but sometimes teams will deliberately pit "off-sequence" if they feel they can gain an advantage later. Race tactics can affect strategy as well. Late in a race, drivers can reduce throttle input to save fuel at the cost of slower lap times, but by doing so they can stretch their pit window to the end of the race and skip the final pit stop. A late caution can force teams to make a tough call: Stay out on worn tires, or pit and give up track position. The green-white-checker rule can cause headaches, as it can potentially extend the race an unknown number of both green-flag and yellow-flag laps. Furthermore, strategy can be determined by qualifying position. A team that qualifies in the top six positions will have the best choice of pit stalls, most often choosing the first, last, or a stall with an opening either in front of or behind that one. A team that qualifies deeper in the field will have a greater opportunity to be stacked behind cars during a pit stop, slowing them down.

=== NASCAR pit crew roles ===
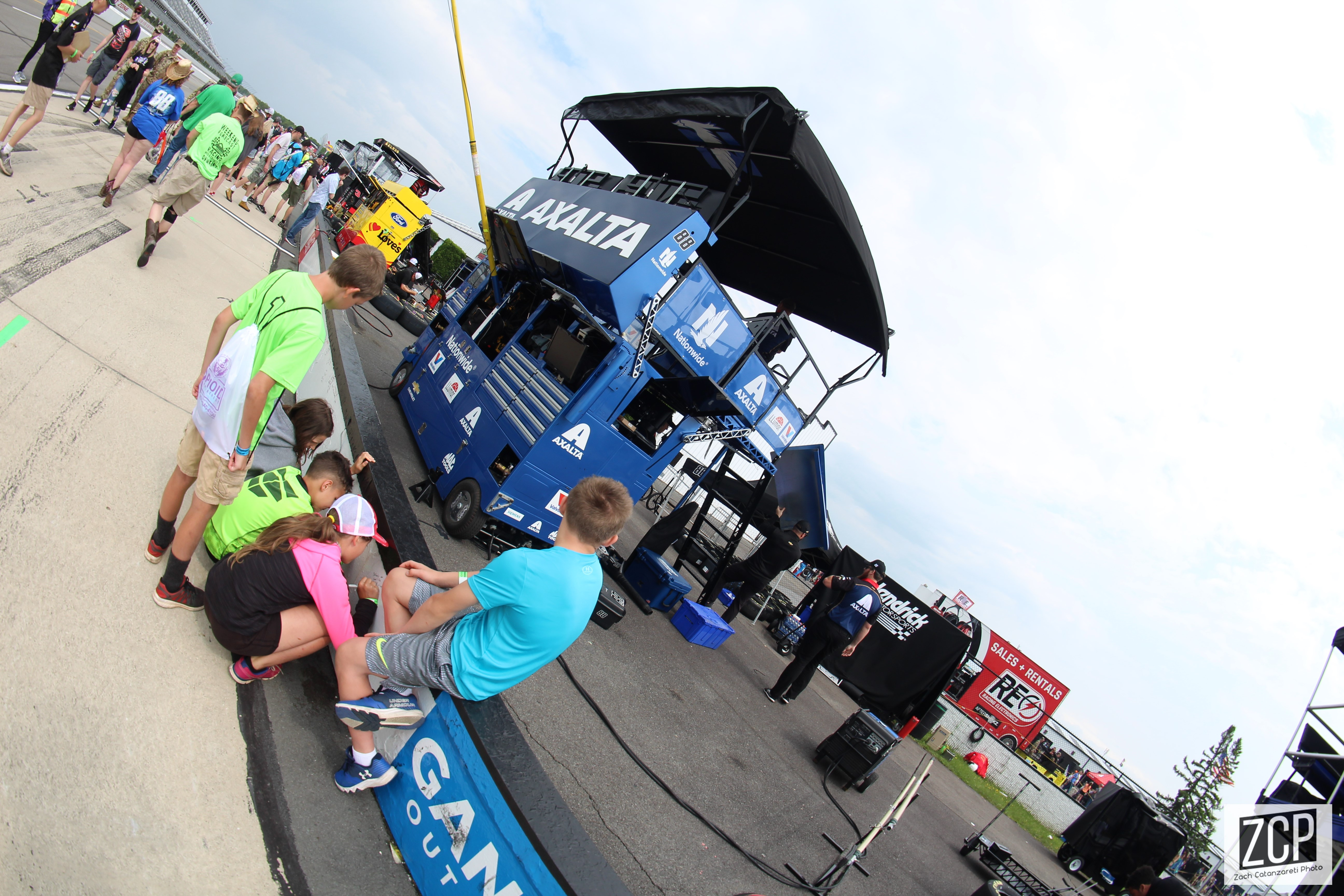
Typical pit box in NASCAR

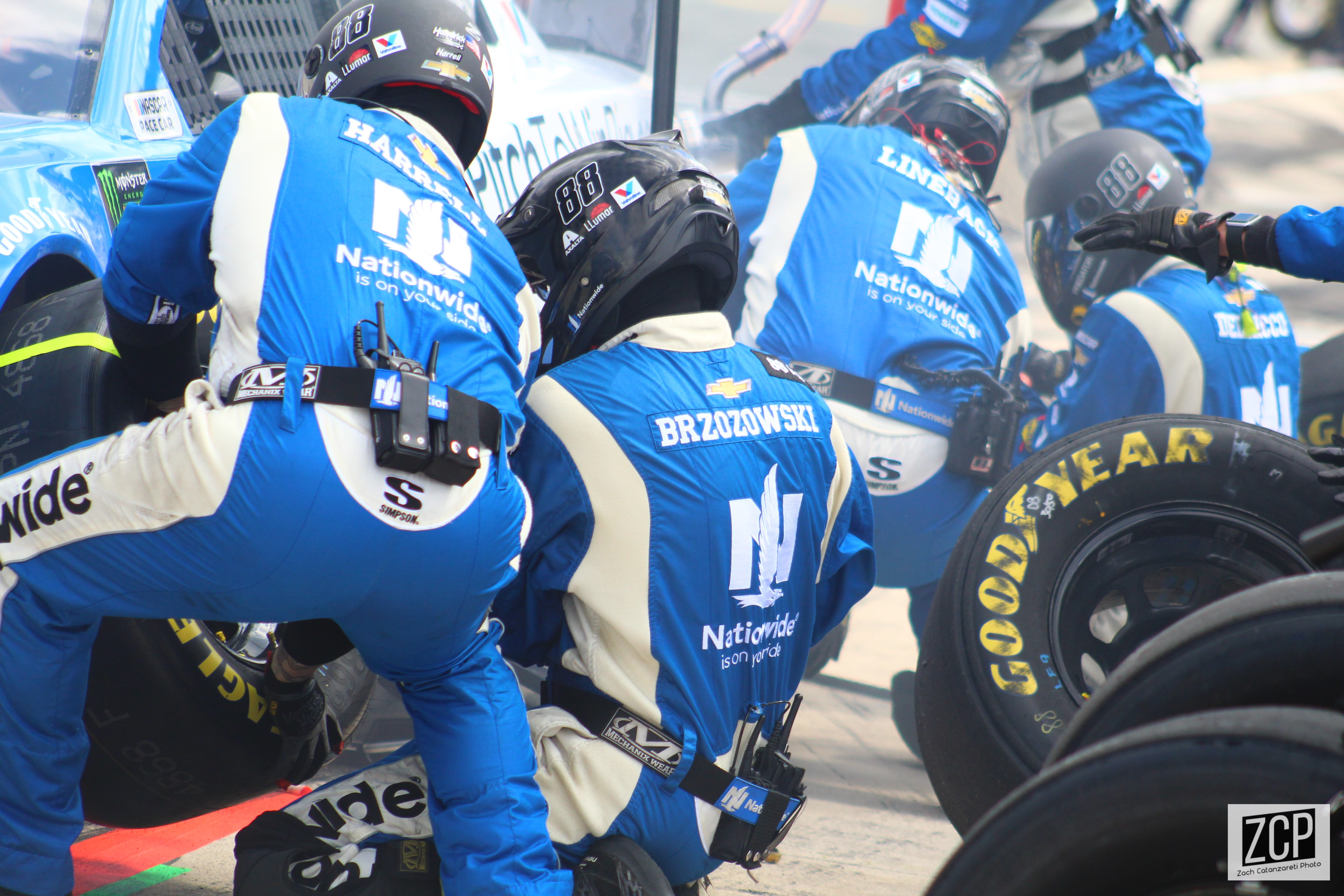
Pit crew on Alex Bowman's car at Dover International Speedway in 2019.

- The crew chief is the leader of the pit crew. They are responsible for all aspects of the crew, car set-up (from the construction of the car at the shop down to in-race handling adjustments), and at-track activities. They call the team's pit strategy (usually with the help of one or more race engineers who monitor telemetry) and will hire a pit crew coach to help coordinate the pit stops and train the pit crew members to stay in good physical shape. NASCAR regulations dictate that only five individuals can go "over the wall" to service a racecar during a pit stop. The tool limits on the crew are two impact wrenches, one jack, and two cans of gasoline. Other tools may be used if needed, but major work must be performed in the garage area. An important tool used by the crew chief is referred to as the pit box, but colloquially called the "war wagon". The pit box is a large wheeled structure which holds various mechanical tools as well as an elevated platform for the crew chief and strategists to watch the race. It is equipped with flat-screen monitors which display timing and telemetry data plus camera feeds from the television broadcast of the event. (Telemetry and strategy are usually handled inside the garage at most European circuits where the pit stalls are directly adjacent to a team's garage; however, due to the design of most North American tracks where the garages are centrally located in the infield, this necessitates the use of a separate installation such as a pit box.)
- The car chief performs a majority of the scheduling and day-to-day preparations at the shop prior to the race weekend. This person is responsible for managing the crew throughout the weekend, ensuring that the car meets all of NASCAR's inspection requirements, and overseeing changes to the car requested by the crew chief or the team engineer. This role is similar to that of a chief operating officer's in general. If the crew chief is not able to attend the race, the car chief will occasionally serve as interim crew chief.
- The jackman raises each side of the car so that the tires can be replaced. This person must do this quickly with the use of a 22-pound (10 kg) floor jack, while also removing and reinstalling the rear tires since the removal of the rear tire carrier. The jackman signals for the driver to leave the pits by lowering the car.
- The two tire changers remove and tighten the lug nuts on the tires using a specification impact wrench (or "air gun") made by Paoli (prior to the 2018 season, air guns were open to development, and top teams often built their own from scratch). One tire changer is solely responsible for the front tires, while the other is responsible for the rears. Until the 2022 season, NASCAR required a wheel to have five traditional lug nuts, as opposed to the single locking lug nut seen in other professional racing categories. Many jackmen watched the tire changers to make sure the lug nuts are tight, as NASCAR rules stated that all five lug nuts must be in contact with the wheel.
- The fueler or gas man fills the car with Sunoco Green E15 racing fuel using a special gas can. The fueler is normally prohibited from doing any other work during a stop but may also help pull old tires from the race car after lug nuts are loosened if the car does not need fuel. Prior to the 2011 season, an additional crewman (the "catch-can" man) was allowed over the wall to hold a special can over the car's fuel system overflow port to collect any spilled fuel. NASCAR disallowed the catch-can man in 2011 after self-venting fuel cans were developed.
- The tire carrier brings new outside tires over the pit wall and removes and installs the front tires. They must maintain control of old tires as they are being taken back to the wall, where additional team members will have the new inside tires ready and waiting. The front tire carrier is usually responsible for pulling damaged front fenders away from the tire if necessary. He may also be responsible for cleaning and adding or removing tape to/from the grille during a pit stop in order to adjust front-end downforce and engine temperatures.
- The utility man is only permitted over the wall in the second half of the race (sometimes earlier if conditions and NASCAR dictate otherwise). He may clean the windshield and provide the driver with fresh drinking water and other necessities, but he may not make any other adjustments to the car.

== IndyCar Series ==
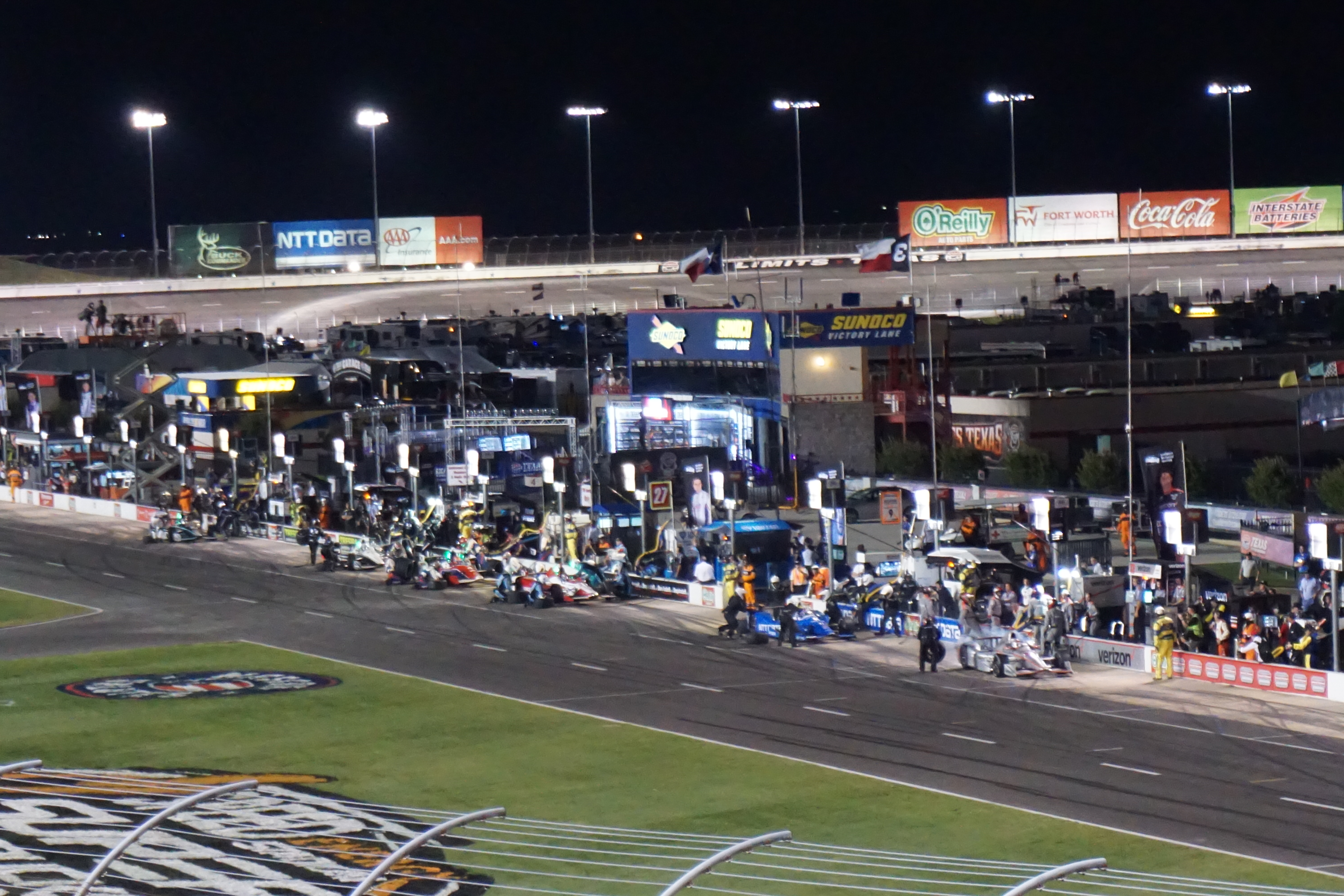
Pit stops during the 2017 Rainguard Water Sealers 600 at Texas Motor Speedway.

In the IndyCar Series, a pit stop is a more complex operation than in NASCAR, but far less so than in Formula One. Rules permit seven mechanics over the pit wall during a stop. The pit rules and procedures have origins in USAC National Championship racing. The spare fuel for IndyCar competition is stored in large pitside fuel tanks. Each team's tank is filled to a specified volume of fuel, depending upon the race distance. Teams are also given a certain allotment of spare tires sets, likewise owing to the race distance. All of the spare tires are pre-mounted on wheels before the race.

During a routine pit stop, the tires are laid out beforehand, and three of the four tire changers are pre-positioned before the car enters its pit stall. The fourth tire changer, whose responsibility is the rear tire on the far side of pit road from the pit wall, does not take his position until after the car arrives, due to a rule against having the car run over the feed hose for the impact wrench used to change the tires, and a prohibition of using an overhead boom to support air hoses. As a result, the outside rear changer also serves to wave at the driver to inform him of where his pit box is while holding the air hose up.

As soon as the car comes to a halt, the first step, taken while the fourth tire changer assumes his position, is for a mechanic to activate the car's built-in pneumatic jacks. A pressurized air hose is inserted into a receiving nozzle at the rear of the car, under the rear wing. Previously, this device was inserted on the side of the car, but for safety reasons, the location was moved in the 2000s. At the same instant, another crew member begins the refueling process. A fueling hose is inserted into a socket (called the "buckeye"), allowing a gravity-fed hose to refill the car's fuel tank. The fuel hose has a built-in vent/overflow hose as part of the mechanism, an invention of the mid-2000s. Previously, a second "vent hose" was utilized, but it was phased out to improve safety.

Simultaneously, the four tire changers remove the wheels and install the new ones. IndyCar wheels are affixed to the hubs with a single lug nut, making it easier and faster to change them. After the tire changes are complete, the front tire changers may use manual adjusters to adjust the angle of the car's front wing, remove debris from air intakes, or make other minor repairs. While the service is being completed by the over-the-wall crew, another crew member behind the wall may use a stick to offer the driver a refreshment.

Since the introduction of the Aeroscreen in 2020 the seventh crew member is permitted to remove tear-offs from the screen allowing the driver to have clearer vision by removing debris. This crew member is typically gloveless and is not permitted to interact with the car in any other way.

After the tire changes are complete, the air jack hose is removed, dropping the car to the ground. However, the driver usually must wait additional seconds until the refueling is complete. The right front tire changer (who is usually also the crew chief) signals the driver when the stop is complete. Before the car departs its pit stall, a crew member must squirt water to wash any excess spilled fuel from the fuel buckeye; this is usually done with a pressurized water hose by a crew member behind the pit wall.

Under normal conditions, a routine stop for an IndyCar team lasts between six and ten seconds. IndyCar teams are permitted to set their own pit strategies.

== Super Formula ==
Pit stop practice sequence in Super Formula at Suzuka Circuit

In Super Formula, Japan's top-level single-seater series, a total of six mechanics are allowed to work on a car. Of these six, three have fixed roles: the lollipop-signalman, the refueler, and the fire-fighter. They are forbidden from undertaking any other function during the pit stop. The remaining three mechanics are responsible for all other operations, most notably jacking up the car and changing the tyres. The general strategy is to have the three free mechanics operate on the car in an assembly-line-like manner, moving around the car between different stations. Because of the limited personnel, teams often come up with creative solutions to decrease pit stop times. For example, some teams employ an automatic front jack, which is placed in front of the car as it stops. Mechanics might also jump over the nose-cone of the car to save time getting to the other side. With the automatic front jack, a Super Formula pit stop takes between ten and twelve seconds; even without the automatic jack, pit stops can be completed in as little as fourteen seconds.

== Endurance racing ==
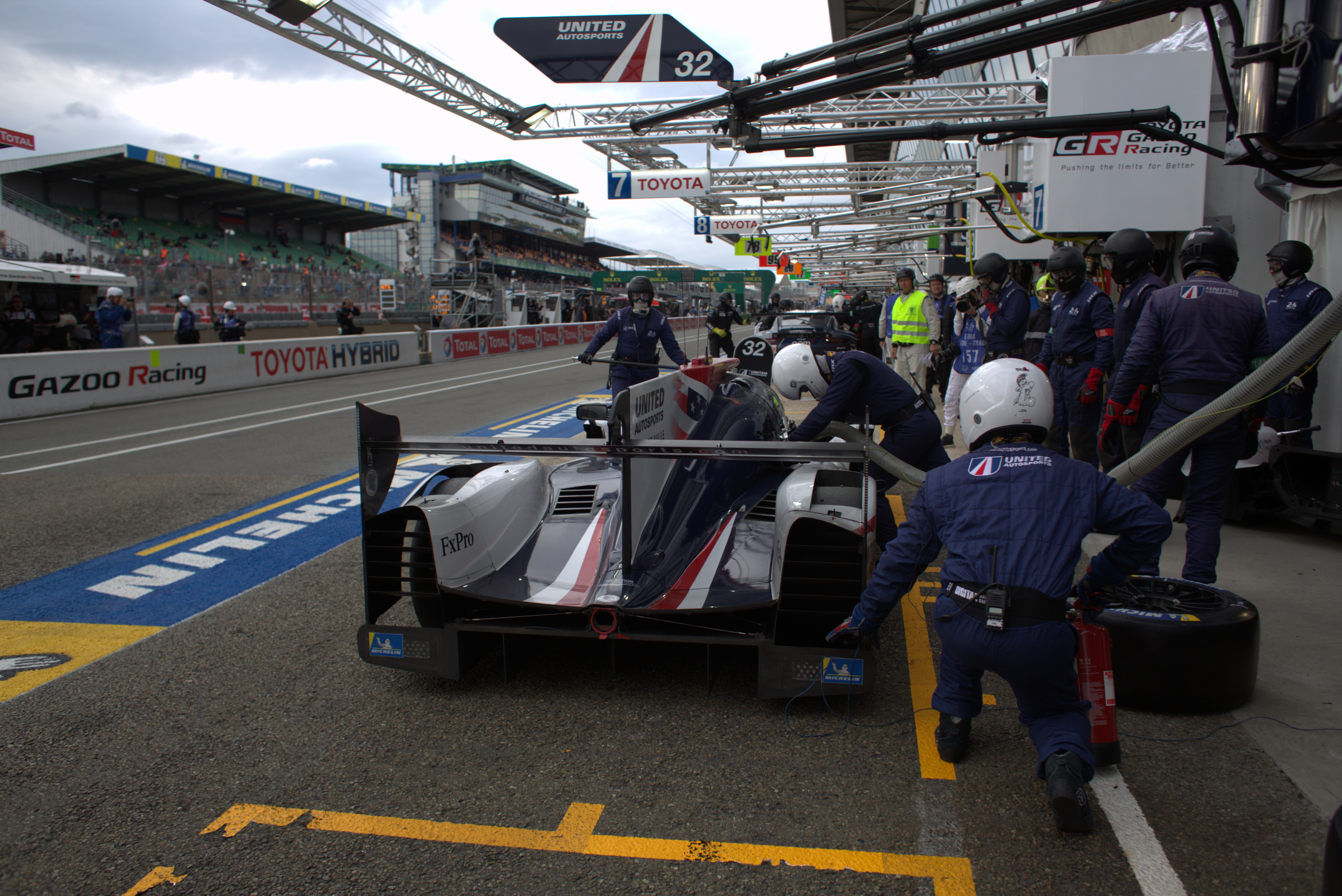
United Autosports performs a pit stop during the 2019 24 Hours of Le Mans.

In the various forms of sports car endurance racing, pit stops are a more leisurely affair, but no less important than in other forms of racing. While stops take longer, much more routine maintenance is scheduled during such pit stops, needed to keep the car running for as long as twenty-four hours; this includes major aerodynamic changes to deal with the changing temperature in such a long race, and replacement of certain wear-limited parts, such as brake pads. Due to the fact that the race is scheduled to last a certain length of time rather than a specific distance, pit strategies are generally not designed to be synchronised with the race distance, but rather to happen on a schedule based on the car's requirements for routine service.

Under the rules of the Automobile Club de l'Ouest (ACO) only five mechanics are permitted to work on the car. One man is permitted to fuel the car; all fuelling must be completed before any other service occurs. The other four mechanics on pit lane at any given time are typically two tyre changers and two tyre carriers, each of whom handles his task on only one side of the car. Automatic pneumatic jacks are used, integrated into the car itself. At all times the car's engine must be shut off during the stop, and may start only when the stop has concluded.

IMSA allows only four mechanics to service a car during a pit stop. One crew member will refuel the car while the other three are responsible for changing tyres and operating the pneumatic jacks. A fifth crew-member must serve as the team's designated firefighter and must stand ready in the pit stall with a fire extinguisher while the car is being refuelled. A sixth crew-member may assist in a driver change. Neither the firefighter or driver's assistant may perform any additional service to the car. Unlike the ACO, IMSA does not force crews to wait for fuelling to complete before changing tyres, and does not require the car's engine be shut off during the stop.

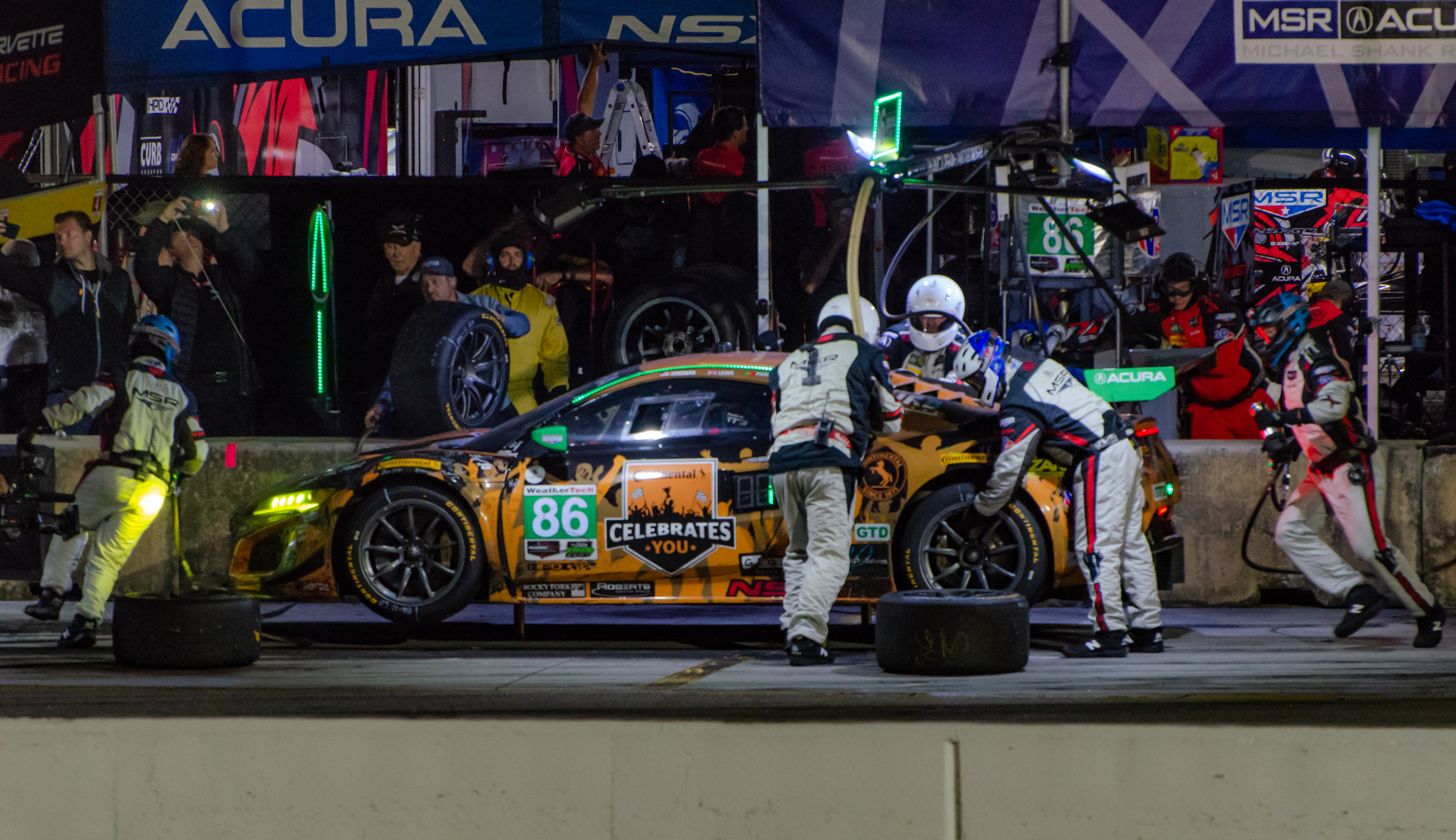
Michael Shank Racing Acura performs a pit stop during 2018 Petit Le Mans.

In endurance racing, driver changes are mandatory; the shortest endurance races are scheduled for four hours, one hour longer than the longest nonstop time permitted behind the wheel. During a pit stop with a driver change, the new driver and a driver change assistant are permitted into the pit lane. The assistant, who may not do any mechanical work on the car, is tasked with helping the current driver out of the car, removing or swapping driver seat inserts, helping the new driver into the car, and helping the new driver tightly fasten his safety harness and connect his various helmet connections to the car's systems, including the two-way team radio and the drink bottle used to stave off dehydration.

A routine pit stop with no scheduled maintenance and no driver change generally lasts from thirty to forty seconds. With a driver change included, that time increases by about ten seconds. Should there be significant scheduled maintenance, such as changing brake pads, the stop can easily last well over a minute.

Unlike most other forms of racing, the practice of "double-stinting" or even "triple-stinting" tyres is commonplace in longer races; tyres hard enough to withstand the rigours of racing in the heat of the daytime may be so hard that they do not wear significantly during the nighttime hours. In a race where this is an issue, significant time can be gained by choosing to leave worn tyres on the car during the first stop after they were put on the car; if the temperature drops low enough, teams may even be able to go two pit stops without changing tyres.

== Notable pit stops ==
- 1963 Daytona 500: Wood Brothers Racing developed choreographed pit stops to reduce the amount of time spent on pit road. Driver Tiny Lund spent so little time on pit road that he went on to win the race without changing his tyres once. For this, Wood Brothers Racing is often credited with inventing the modern pit stop.
- 1965 Indianapolis 500: Wood Brothers Racing was invited by Ford to service the Lotus 38-Ford driven by Scottish Formula One driver Jim Clark. This brought their new concept of fast pit stops into open-wheel racing. Clark won the race with an average speed of 150.686 miles per hour (a new Indianapolis 500 record). This was Ford's first win at Indianapolis.
- 1976 Indianapolis 500: A world record was set for time taken in a pit-stop when Bobby Unser pitted in four seconds.
- 1981 Daytona 500: During the final round of pit stops, Richard Petty's crew called off a planned tyre change, and serviced fuel only. The lightning-fast stop put Petty back on the track in the lead, and he held off a shocked Bobby Allison for a record seventh Daytona 500 victory.
- 1982 Indianapolis 500: Gordon Johncock and Rick Mears were running together on the track as they approached their final pit stops. Johncock's crew saved time by giving him just enough fuel to finish the race, sending him out with an 11-second lead. The better-handling Mears closed the gap but ran out of laps as Johncock hung on to win by 0.16 seconds.
- 1989 Portuguese Grand Prix: Nigel Mansell came in too fast and missed his pit box. He then reversed back to take his spot, and mechanics changed the tyres. Due to reversing in pit lane (as opposed to waiting for the mechanics to push him back), he was disqualified. He did not acknowledge the black flag, later collided with Ayrton Senna and was subsequently given a one-race suspension.
- 1991 First Union 400: After an offseason of discussion at the end of the NASCAR season during the Atlanta Journal 500 when Melling Racing rear tyre changer Mike Rich was killed by Ricky Rudd's car going out of control during a pit stop, NASCAR experimented with various rules on tyre changes in an attempt to prevent a similar incident from happening again. The first was to only allow tyre changes during green flag racing, with the first lap after the restart being assigned to cars that started in odd-numbered starting positions, and the second lap after restart for even-numbered starting positions. The rule was unpopular, and teams began to change tyres only for regularly scheduled times under the green flag. After the first five races, NASCAR experimented with a rule for the Valleydale Meats 500 in Bristol. The same odd–even rules were used for the first two laps of a pit stop under caution, with the cars starting double-file, with the odd cars on the inside and even cars on the outside. After more complaints, for the seventh race, at North Wilkesboro Speedway, NASCAR reverted to the rules prior to the 1990 crash, along with a new rule mandating a pit lane speed limit. By the middle of the 1990s, almost all motorsport began enforcing a pit lane speed limit.
- 1991 Toyota Grand Prix of Long Beach: Michael Andretti's pit service was complete as he passed by Emerson Fittipaldi, who began exiting his pit area. Fittipaldi was apparently unaware that Andretti was approaching, and as the two made wheel-to wheel contact Andretti's car was launched into the air. Andretti's damaged car slid into another pit stall, but, though very angry, he walked away uninjured. As this incident took place in the wake of the aforementioned First Union 400, this incident prompted CART to mandate pit lane speed limits.
- 1991 Portuguese Grand Prix: Nigel Mansell lost a wheel instantly after making his stop. The mechanics put the wheel back on in the middle of pit road, and Mansell was disqualified for the second time in three years in the event.
- 1993 European Grand Prix: On lap 57, Ayrton Senna came into the pit lane for a tyre change but aborted the stop and drove straight through instead. In the process, he ended up setting the fastest lap of the race, due to both the unique configuration of Donington Park's pit lane, and the lack of pit lane speed limits in F1 at the time (which would be introduced the following year after Senna's death).
- 1993 Australian Grand Prix: McLaren's Ayrton Senna came into the pit unexpectedly for new tyres; the team serviced the car in under four seconds.
- 1994 San Marino Grand Prix: Michele Alboreto lost a wheel after his pit stop. The wheel caused injuries to mechanics from Ferrari and Lotus. Following this and other tragic events during the weekend, the pit lane speed limit was introduced in Formula One.
- 1994 German Grand Prix: Benetton driver Jos Verstappen came into the pits; while refuelling, some fuel was accidentally sprayed onto the hot bodywork of the car – a few seconds later the fuel ignited and Verstappen's car was engulfed in a ball of flames. Verstappen escaped the incident with burns around his eyes, as he had his visor up during the pit stop.
- 1995 Spanish Grand Prix: Johnny Herbert exited his pit box with the rear jack still attached to his car. It fell off harmlessly at the pit lane exit.
- 1996 24 Hours of Daytona: Max Papis was charging around the track on the final stint of the race, trying to catch the leader. On his final pit stop, Papis entered the pit area at full speed (~200 mph). Despite still finishing second, the startling sight helped earn him the name "Mad Max." This is no longer possible, as almost all federations controlling motorsport have adopted pit lane speed limits because of crew safety.
- 1998 British Grand Prix: Two laps from the finish, Ferrari driver Michael Schumacher was issued a 10-second penalty. His team interpreted it as a requirement to drive through the pit lane without exceeding the speed limit, stop at a designated penalty area, and remain stationary for 10 seconds before returning to the track. While driving along the pit lane during the final lap, Schumacher crossed the finish line (which extended across the lane) before reaching the penalty area and before Mika Häkkinen could do so on the track. The penalty was later rescinded, and Schumacher was declared the winner.
- 1999 Portland Grand Prix: Gil de Ferran was leading but had insufficient fuel to make it to the finish. Rather than try to conserve fuel, de Ferran's Walker Racing team instructed him to drive all-out to build enough of a margin to make an extra pit stop. The strategy was a gamble as a yellow flag would bunch the field and wipe out any margin de Ferran built. The green flag stayed out, de Ferran pitted without losing the lead and he went on to take the team's first win in four years.
- 2001 24 Hours of Le Mans: Joest Racing changed the transaxle on their Audi R8 (a process that usually takes hours) in less than 5 minutes. They went on to win the overall race.
- 2002 UAW-Daimler Chrysler 400: Sterling Marlin of Chip Ganassi Racing spun while attempting to make a late race pit stop, causing him to break the pit road speed limit. At the time, NASCAR's penalty for speeding while entering pit road was to hold the driver in his pit stall for an additional 15 seconds. The official in Marlin's pit was not informed of the penalty until after the crew released the car. NASCAR determined that they had no precedent for forcing Marlin to return to the pits as his early release was their mistake (and they could not order him back for a stop and go penalty). Marlin won the race by 1.163 seconds. Following the incident, NASCAR amended its rules so that all green flag speeding violations are enforced with a drive through penalty (forcing the driver to travel the length of pit road at the speed limit).
- 2002 The Winston: Roush Racing's Jeff Burton made a pit stop on the final lap of the first 40-lap segment. A pit stop for tyres was mandatory during the segment, but the rule did not stipulate when it had to be taken. By selecting a pit stall only 100 yards/metres shy of the start/finish line, Burton did not have to spend the time all the other drivers took traveling the entire length of pit road. Since Sprint All-Star Race XIX, the rule was modified to mandate the stop within a specific number of laps in the race.
- 2008 Canadian Grand Prix: Ferrari's Kimi Räikkönen came to a stop at the end of the pit lane as the exit was closed, with the red indicator light on. Räikkönen was alongside BMW's Robert Kubica at the end of the pit lane when Lewis Hamilton sped towards them not noticing the red light at first. Hamilton slid into the back of Räikkönen's car, with Nico Rosberg further hitting the back of Hamilton. Both Hamilton and Räikkönen retired from the race, each leaving their vehicles at the exit of the pit lane. Both Hamilton and Rosberg were penalised a 10-place grid penalty at the next Grand Prix in France.
- 2008 Singapore Grand Prix: Ferrari's Felipe Massa drove off with the fuel hose still attached to the car knocking down a member of the pit crew while he attempted to head back to the track as he was mistakenly shown the green signal. The problem was later attributed to the failure of Ferrari's automated light system. This being the first night race in F1, the Ferrari team subsequently resumed the use of the traditional lollipop man for the remainder of the season.
- 2011 Abu Dhabi Grand Prix: McLaren's Lewis Hamilton entered the pit lane and had his service in 3.19 seconds followed seconds later by teammate Jenson Button having a 4-second pit stop.
- 2012 Chinese Grand Prix: The Ferrari team completed a pit stop for Fernando Alonso in 2.4 seconds.
- 2012 German Grand Prix: The McLaren team completed a pit stop for Jenson Button in 2.31 seconds.
- 2013 Malaysian Grand Prix: McLaren's previous record of 2.31 seconds was bettered six times during the course of the race, the fastest of which came from Infiniti Red Bull Racing's pit stop for Mark Webber, completing the stop in 2.05 seconds. Lewis Hamilton also had a notable pit stop after accidentally driving his Mercedes car into the McLaren pits, after only moving from the team two races prior.
- 2013 German Grand Prix: Mark Webber was released from the pit box before his right-rear wheel was properly fitted on. The tyre came loose as he drove down the pit lane and hit a cameraman. This led to increased pit lane safety measures being implemented, including mandatory head protection for all team members working on a car during a pit stop, a reduced pit lane speed limit, and restricted access for the media into the pit lane.
- 2013 GoPro Indy Grand Prix of Sonoma: While exiting his pit stall, race contender Scott Dixon struck Will Power's right rear tyre carrier, who was thrown into another pit crew member, while another member of Power's crew was injured by an air gun. Dixon was penalised for the incident, but he believed the tyre carrier had intentionally walked in front of his car. Power would go on to win the race, while Dixon's penalty relegated him to 21st, and a final finishing position of 15th.
- 2013 Japanese Grand Prix: The Ferrari team completed a pit stop for Fernando Alonso in 1.95 seconds.
- 2013 US Grand Prix: The Red Bull Racing Team completed a pit stop for Mark Webber which they timed at 1.923 seconds.
- 2016 European Grand Prix: The Williams Team completed a pit stop for Felipe Massa in 1.92 seconds.
- 2018 Australian Grand Prix: Kevin Magnussen, driving for Haas F1 Team, was released from the pit box before all wheels were properly fitted. Two laps later, his teammate Romain Grosjean was also released with a loose wheel, forcing both drivers to retire. Haas was fined €10,000 for the unsafe pit releases.
- 2018 Bahrain Grand Prix: During Kimi Räikkönen's second pit stop, his Ferrari struck tyre changer Francesco Cigarini's left leg as it left the pit box, fracturing Cigarini's tibia and fibula. The cause of the incident was a sensor confusion in the Ferrari pit box light system.
- 2019 DXC Technology 600: Having led the race from pole position, Rahal Letterman Lanigan Racing's Takuma Sato entered the pits for his first stop at the end of lap 62 and overshot his pit box, hooking the inside air hoses and lollipop on his car and launching the inside front tire changer into the next pit box. The crewman was uninjured, but the lengthy pit stop and subsequent penalty for hitting pit equipment left Sato 3 laps down and out of contention.
- 2019 British Grand Prix: The Red Bull Racing team completed a 1.91 pit stop for Pierre Gasly, making it the fourth fastest pit stop in F1 and overall.
- 2019 German Grand Prix: The Red Bull Racing team completed a pit stop for Max Verstappen in 1.88 seconds, making it the third fastest pit stop in F1 and overall.
- 2019 Brazilian Grand Prix: The Red Bull Racing team completed a pit stop for Max Verstappen in 1.82 seconds, making it the second fastest pit stop ever in F1 and overall.
- 2021 Monaco Grand Prix: Valtteri Bottas of the Mercedes team was forced to retire from the race after his wheel could not be removed from the car due to a faulty wheel nut.
- 2023 Qatar Grand Prix: The McLaren team completed a pit stop for Lando Norris in 1.80 seconds, making it the fastest pit stop ever in any racing series.

== See also ==
- Water stop
- Chequered Flag, the first videogame to feature pit stops to repair damage and take on fuel
