= 2002 The Winston =

18th iteration of the NASCAR All-Star Race

Location	Lowe's Motor Speedway, Concord, North Carolina
Date	May 18, 2002
Laps	90 (segment #1: 40 laps, segment #2: 30 laps, segment #3: 20 laps)
- Distance
Winner	Ryan Newman
Segment #1 winner	Jimmie Johnson
Segment #2 winner	Jimmie Johnson
The Winston Open winner	Jeremy Mayfield
No Bull Sprint winner	Ryan Newman
Average speed	110.005 MPH
Most laps led	Jimmie Johnson
- Television
Network	FX
Announcers	Mike Joy, Darrell Waltrip and Larry McReynolds

The 2002 edition of the NASCAR All-Star Race (known as The Winston for sponsorship purposes) was held on May 18, 2002, at Lowe's Motor Speedway in Concord, North Carolina. It featured the last multiple-segment Open where only segment winners advanced until 2015, and had a 27-car field, the largest in All-Star race history. Ryan Newman won the race and became the second driver since Michael Waltrip to win the event after coming out from the Open. Newman (Segment 2) and Jeremy Mayfield (Segment 1) advance to The Winston after winning the two segments of the Open races.

It was the first of two editions of the all-star event to feature eliminations. Temperatures hovered around the 66.5 °F (19.2 °C) mark throughout the event while winds were gusting in at up to 15.9 miles per hour (25.6 km/h).

== Summary ==
=== Drivers and eligibility ===
- #1 - Steve Park (winner at North Carolina Motor Speedway in the spring of 2001)
- #2 - Rusty Wallace (winner at California Speedway in 2001)
- #5 - Terry Labonte (2-time NASCAR Winston Cup Series champion in 1984 and 1996)
- #6 - Mark Martin (1998 The Winston (now Sprint All-Star Race XIV) winner)
- #8 - Dale Earnhardt Jr. (3 wins in 2001 and 2002)
- #9 - Bill Elliott (2001 Pennzoil Freedom 400 winner)
- #15 - Michael Waltrip (2001 Daytona 500 winner)
- #17 - Matt Kenseth (2 wins in 2002)
- #18 - Bobby Labonte (3 wins in 2001 and 2002)
- #20 - Tony Stewart (5 wins in 2001 and 2002)
- #21 - Elliott Sadler (winner at Bristol Motor Speedway in 2001)
- #22 - Ward Burton (2 wins in 2001 and 2002, including 2002 Daytona 500)
- #24 - Jeff Gordon (2001 NASCAR Winston Cup Series champion, six wins)
- #25 - Joe Nemechek (winner at North Carolina Speedway in the fall of 2001)
- #28 - Ricky Rudd (winner at Richmond International Raceway in 2001)
- #29 - Kevin Harvick (winner at Atlanta Motor Speedway in 2001)
- #31 - Robby Gordon (winner at New Hampshire International Speedway in 2001)
- #32 - Ricky Craven (winner at Martinsville Speedway in 2001)
- #33 - Mike Wallace (advanced by driving a winning car in 2001; Joe Nemechek had won for Petree's #33 at the Pop Secret 400 in 2001)
- #40 - Sterling Marlin (4 wins in 2001 and 2002)
- #48 - Jimmie Johnson (winner at California Speedway in 2002)
- #55 - Bobby Hamilton (winner at Talladega Superspeedway in 2001)
- #88 - Dale Jarrett (4 wins in 2001)
- #97 - Kurt Busch (winner at Bristol Motor Speedway in 2002)
- #99 - Jeff Burton (2 wins in 2001)

=== The Winston Open/No Bull 5 Sprint ===
Jeremy Mayfield won the pole for the event and won the race, thus advancing to The Winston. Ken Schrader started the race on the pole but finished in 3rd. Ryan Newman who almost made the race in 2001 until losing an engine with just two laps to go during the Open advanced with the win. This was the last Open with multiple segments where only the winners of each segment advanced until the 2015 edition.

==== The Winston Open top five results ====
- #19 - Jeremy Mayfield (advances to feature)
- #36 - Ken Schrader
- #12 - Ryan Newman
- #23 - Hut Stricklin
- #45 - Kyle Petty

==== No Bull 5 Sprint top five results ====
- #12 - Ryan Newman (advances to feature)
- #45 - Kyle Petty
- #36 - Ken Schrader
- #23 - Hut Stricklin
- #41 - Jimmy Spencer

=== Race recap ===
During the first segment of the race they ran the first 40 laps. On the 14th lap, Sterling Marlin, Dale Jarrett, Rusty Wallace and Bobby Hamilton were all caught up in a four car crash as the wreck happened in turn two. Jeff Burton had to make a mandatory pit stop and with the strategy of crew chief Frank Stoddard, he made the pit stop on the last lap and their stall was just near the start/finish line and finished 2nd. Jimmie Johnson won the first segment, while the 27-car field would be cut to 20 cars under the first of two eliminations in this format. In addition to the four eliminated in the Lap 14 crash, Mike Wallace, Steve Park and Ward Burton were eliminated on track.

Ryan Newman was the last driver to transfer in segment two, but during that segment, he spun out Elliott Sadler and sent him towards the wall. After the accident, Sadler throw his helmet towards Newman's car, then later apologized to his sponsor about his behavior during an interview with Dick Berggren. Later, Jeff Burton also was withdrawn with a clutch problem in this segment.

Johnson would win the second segment. The format called for elimination of ten cars at the end of this segment, leaving Jeremy Mayfield, Bobby, Terry Labonte, Mark Martin, Ricky Rudd, Jeff Gordon and Michael Waltrip eliminated in segment two on the track.

In the last segment, only ten cars were left and late in the segment, Kurt Busch spun out Robby Gordon, driving for RCR's #31 chevy. Robby Gordon would finish in 7th place, but was visibly furious with Kurt who later admitted that he intentionally spun Gordon to make the race "more competitive." Busch was later fined $25,000 for his actions.

The caution led to a final 5 lap shootout, and Ryan Newman held off a hard-fought Dale Earnhardt Jr. and wins the Winston of 2002 and wins a total of $750,000 and the second driver (Michael Waltrip in 1996) to win The Winston after coming from the Opener and the only driver from the No Bull 5 Sprint.

== The Winston results ==
1. #12 - Ryan Newman (the Winston winner and No Bull 5 Sprint winner)
2. #8 - Dale Earnhardt Jr.
3. #17 - Matt Kenseth
4. #97 - Kurt Busch
5. #48 - Jimmie Johnson (segment 1 and 2 winner)
6. #20 - Tony Stewart
7. #31 - Robby Gordon
8. #29 - Kevin Harvick
9. #32 - Ricky Craven
10. #9 - Bill Elliott
11. #24 - Jeff Gordon
12. #15 - Michael Waltrip
13. #28 - Ricky Rudd
14. #25 - Joe Nemechek
15. #5 - Terry Labonte
16. #18 - Bobby Labonte
17. #19 - Jeremy Mayfield (the Winston Open winner)
18. #6 - Mark Martin
19. #21 - Elliott Sadler
20. #99 - Jeff Burton
21. #22 - Ward Burton
22. #1 - Steve Park
23. #33 - Mike Wallace
24. #40 - Sterling Marlin
25. #55 - Bobby Hamilton
26. #88 - Dale Jarrett
27. #2 - Rusty Wallace
