= Joe Gibbs Racing in the NASCAR Cup Series =

American professional stock car racing organization

Joe Gibbs Racing (JGR) is an American professional stock car racing organization founded by Pro Football Hall of Fame coach Joe Gibbs. His son, J. D. Gibbs, ran the team with him until his death in 2019. Founded in Huntersville, North Carolina, in 1992. JGR has won five Cup Series championships.

== Cars ==
=== Car No. 11 history ===
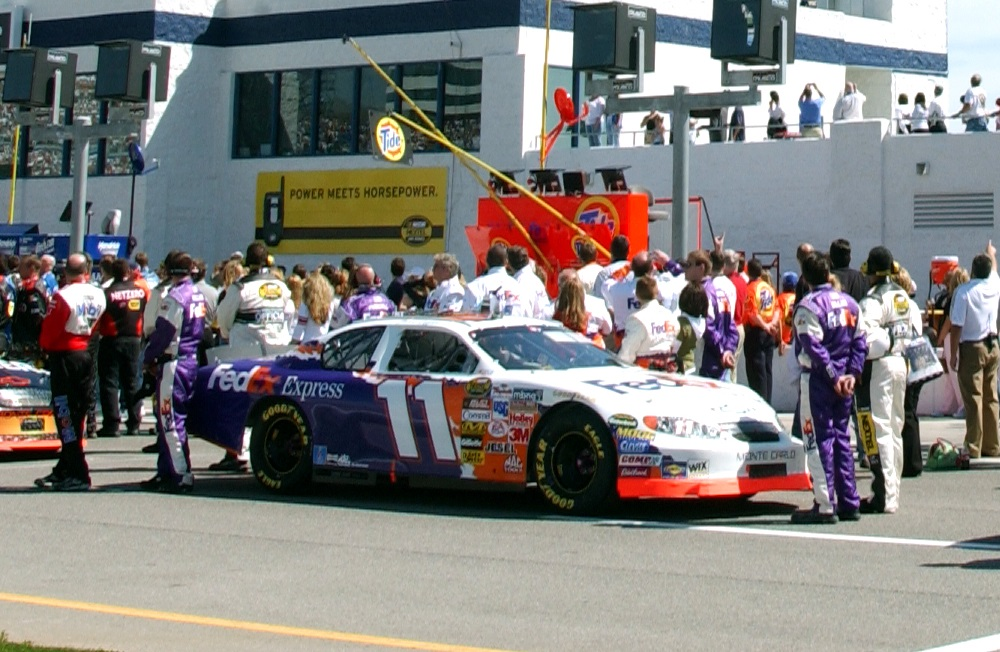
The original No. 11 car driven by Jason Leffler in 2005.

Multiple drivers (2004–2005)

The No. 11 car (the number J. D. Gibbs wore playing football at College of William & Mary) began in 2004. Ricky Craven, recently released from PPI Motorsports finished 30th at Talladega with sponsorship from Old Spice, and Busch Series driver J. J. Yeley ran two races in the car with Vigoro/The Home Depot sponsorship.

The No. 11 car went full-time in 2005, with new sponsor FedEx coming on to fund the full season in a multi-year deal. Jason Leffler, who had driven for JGR in the Busch series, was signed to drive the No. 11 for the full season, while Dave Rogers was named the crew chief. The new team struggled early on in the season. Leffler missed the Coca-Cola 600 at Charlotte, with FedEx Freight moving over to the 18 car that Bobby Labonte would drive to a second-place finish. Rogers was reassigned and replaced with veteran crew chief Mike Ford in June, then former Cup champion Terry Labonte was hired to run the road course at Sonoma, qualifying 8th and finishing a solid 12th. After 19 starts with a best finish of 12th and sitting 36th in points, Leffler was released from the ride. Terry Labonte ran the next three races, then ran the Fall Richmond race finishing 9th. J. J. Yeley ran 4 races with a best finish of 25th. In November, it was announced that Denny Hamlin would drive the car for the remainder of the season, then run for Rookie of the Year in 2006. Hamlin ran seven races, finished in the top 10 three times, and earned a pole at Phoenix International Raceway.

Denny Hamlin (2005–)

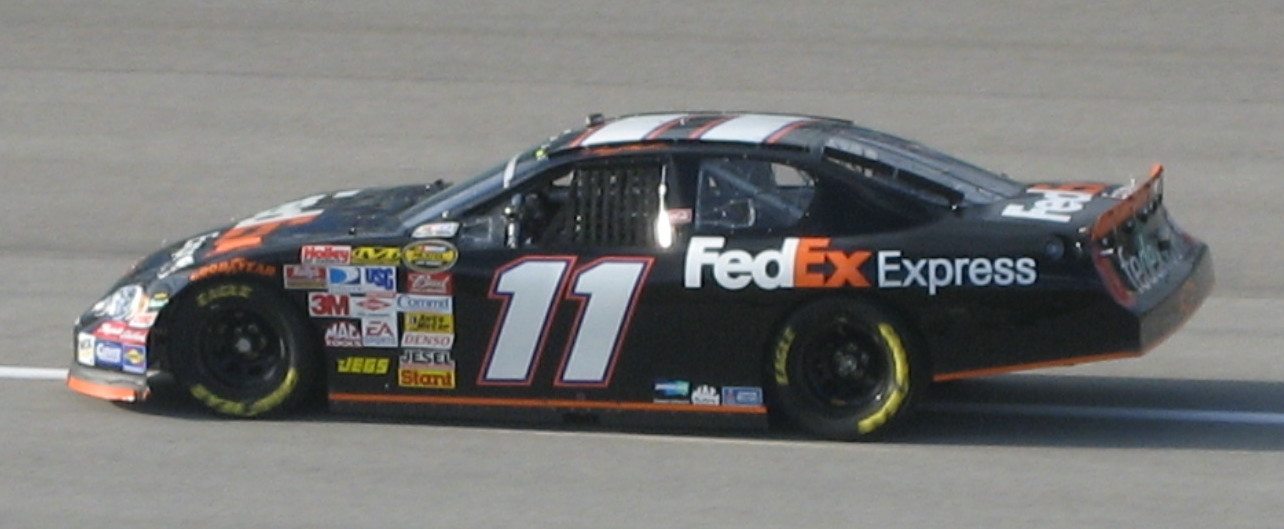
Denny Hamlin at Homestead in 2007.

Hamlin was awarded the No. 11 FedEx Express full-time ride in 2006 in addition to his full-time Busch schedule in the No. 20 Rockwell Automation Chevrolet. Hamlin was part of a large and strong rookie class, including teammate J. J. Yeley, Clint Bowyer, Martin Truex Jr., David Stremme, Brent Sherman, and Reed Sorenson. Hamlin opened the season by winning the Budweiser Shootout non-points race, holding off Dale Earnhardt Jr. on a green-white-checker restart. In June, Hamlin scored his first Cup Series victory at the difficult Pocono Raceway. Hamlin started on the pole, then battled back from a cut tire to take the victory. In his return to the track in July, Hamlin again won the pole, then proceeded to lead 151 of 200 laps en route to a second victory, the first rookie to sweep both Pocono races. Hamlin credited his prowess on the track to practicing on the racing simulator NASCAR Racing 2003 Season. Hamlin's strong performance earned the rookie a berth in the Chase for the NEXTEL Cup, where he would finish 3rd in points. Until 2016, Hamlin was the only rookie to make the Chase.

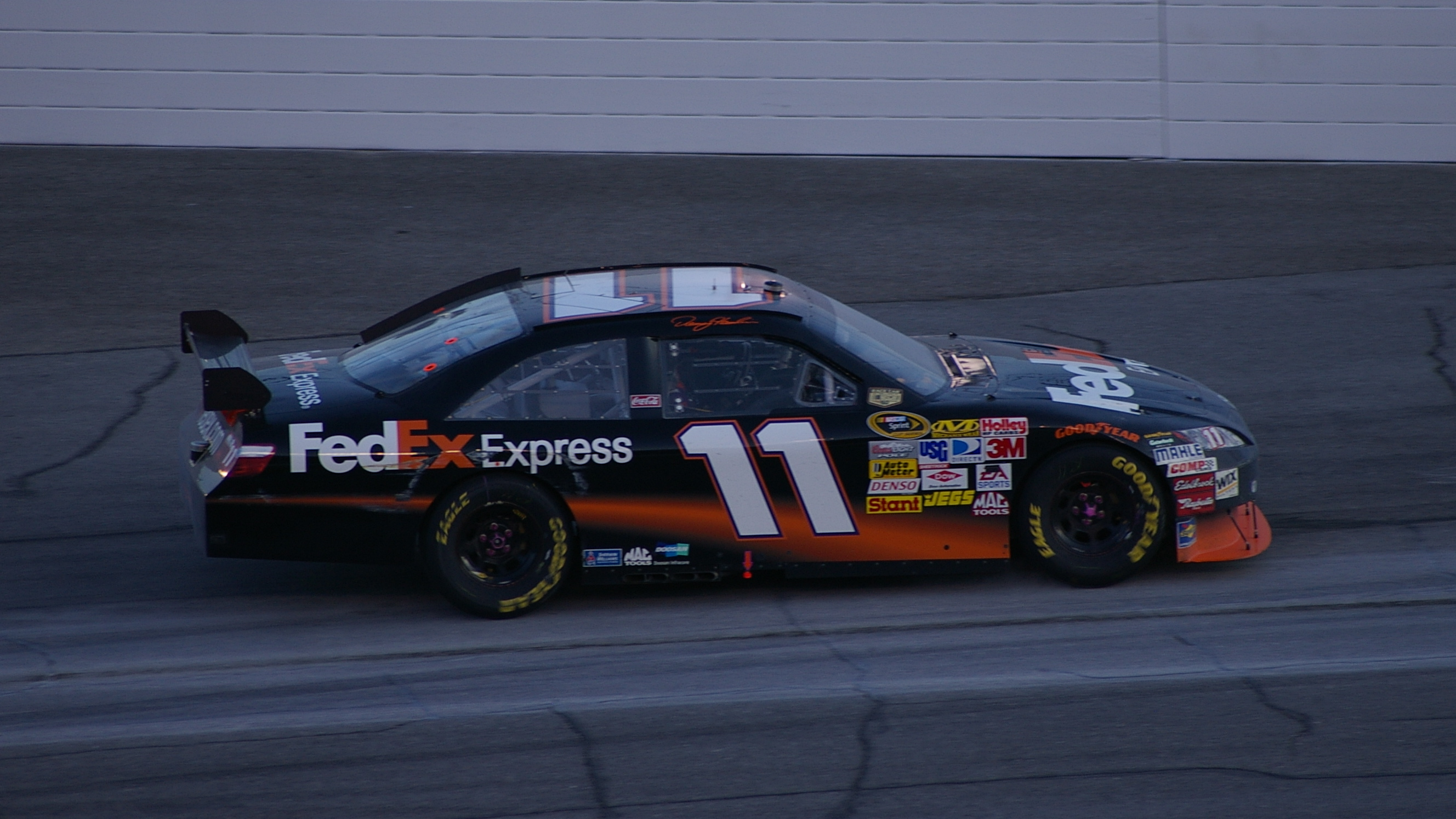
Hamlin's No. 11 Toyota at Daytona International Speedway in 2008.

In 2007, Hamlin won the first of two races at New Hampshire International Speedway 2007 and finished 12th in points. In 2008, Hamlin won the Gatorade Duel and the first race at Martinsville Speedway, and improved to eighth in points. He qualified for the Chase again in 2009 after winning the second race at Pocono Raceway and Richmond International Raceway. He ended the season with four victories after winning Martinsville and Homestead-Miami Speedway in the chase. 2010 was Hamlin and the 11 team's breakout year. They won at Martinsville and Denny followed the win by having knee surgery. After the surgery, the team won 4 of the next 10 races at Texas, Darlington, Pocono, and Michigan. The team made the chase after another win at Richmond. The team won races during the Chase at Martinsville and Texas and held the points lead going into the season finale. However, an early wreck would put them behind the competition, and Hamlin wound up finishing second to Jimmie Johnson during the 2010 chase. Hamlin later admitted to putting too much pressure on himself during the Chase, which mentally impacted him. As a result, Mike Ford took a "no compromise" attitude for 2011, hoping to right the ship. However, the team struggled throughout 2011, with multiple blown engines and a single win at Michigan to push the No. 11 into the Chase. Hamlin would finish 9th in the final standings. At season's end, Mike Ford was released as crew chief and was replaced by Tony Stewart's crew chief Darian Grubb.

Under Darian Grubb, the team started 2012 off in the best way possible by winning the second race of the season at Phoenix. That win was followed by another victory at Kansas six weeks later. The 11 team once again proved dominant on the short tracks pulling off a convincing win in the Bristol Night Race in August. The week after Bristol, the No. 11 FedEx team brought home another victory at Atlanta Motor Speedway, making the No. 11 the car number with the most wins in NASCAR with 200 wins. Hamlin then won the Sylvania 300, giving Joe Gibbs Racing its 100th win.

Hamlin's 2013 season began with an on-and-off track feud with former teammate Joey Logano. Initially started on Twitter, the on track incidents began at Bristol in March, where Hamlin spun Logano in turns 1 and 2, leading Logano to confront Hamlin after the race. The rivalry continued into the next race at Auto Club Speedway, where the two fought for the lead in the closing laps. In the final corner, the two collided, allowing JGR teammate Kyle Busch to win the race, and sending Hamlin's 11 car into a non-SAFER barrier wall near pit road. This wreck would mark the beginning of a difficult season for Hamlin, as he suffered a lower back fracture and was forced to sit out several races. Veteran Mark Martin replaced Hamlin at one of Denny's better tracks, Martinsville Speedway, where he scored a top 10. Brian Vickers then drove the car for the next three races, scoring an 8th-place finish at Texas. Though Hamlin returned to the car at Talladega Superspeedway, he never returned to form during the year, with only 8 top 10s on the year. He did score a win at the season finale at Homestead.

After Jason Leffler's death in 2013, the 11 team paid tribute to their former driver by running a white FedEx scheme at Michigan similar to the one Leffler ran in 2005. At the 2014 Auto Club 400, Sam Hornish Jr. replaced Hamlin due to Hamlin having what was thought to be a sinus infection, but later revealed to be a piece of metal in his eye that impaired his vision. Hornish, who was actually on standby for teammate Matt Kenseth, finished a solid 17th in his return to Cup.

At the 2015 Food City 500, Erik Jones replaced Hamlin after the latter suffered neck spasms. Jones took the car to a 26th-place finish, but Hamlin started the race and was credited with the finish.

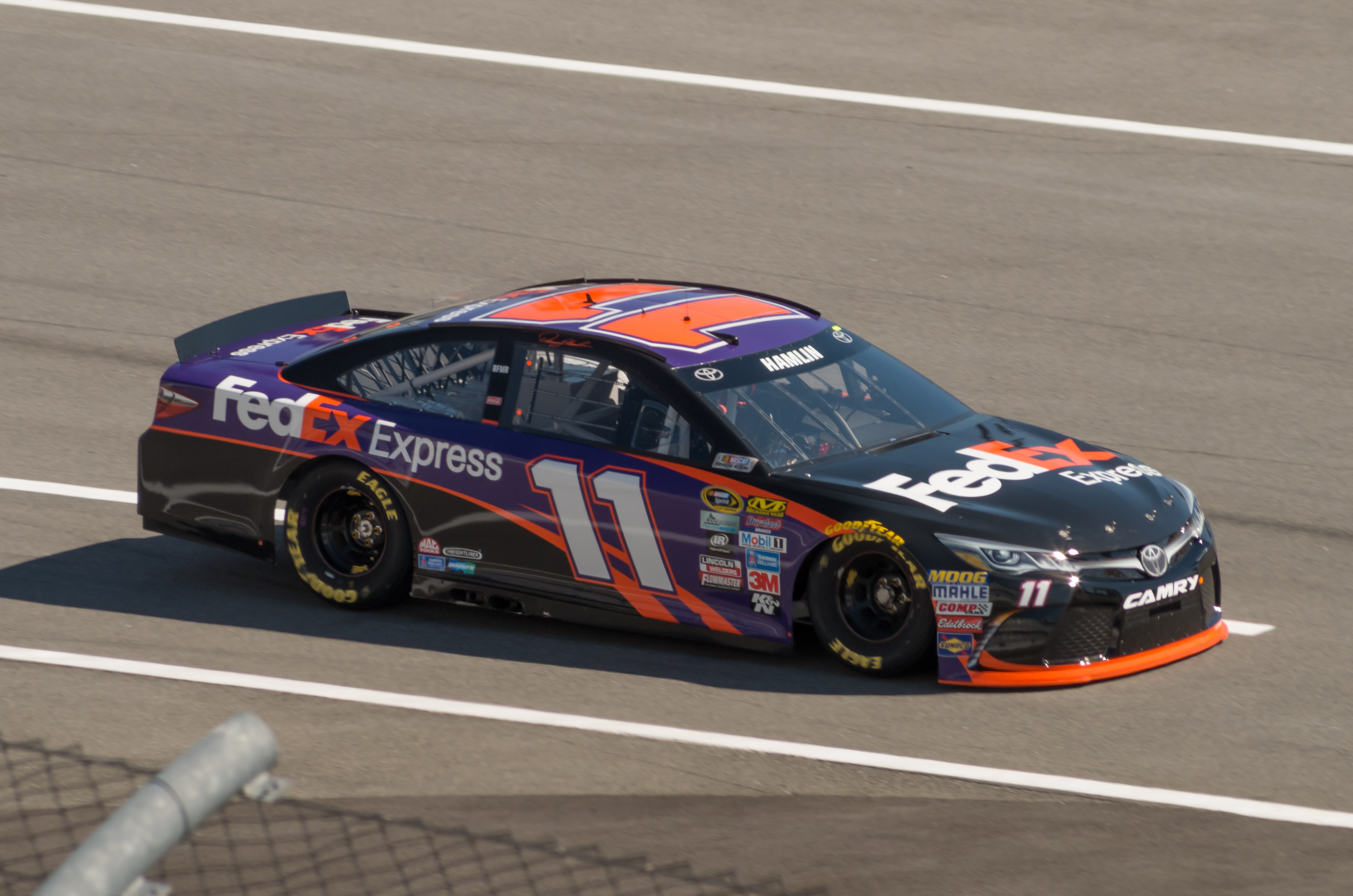
Hamlin during the 2016 Daytona 500.

In 2016, Hamlin started his season out well, winning the 2016 Daytona 500 by beating out Martin Truex Jr. by 0.010 seconds, the closest finish in Daytona 500 history. The win was also the first for his rookie crew chief, Mike Wheeler. He would also win Watkins Glen and Richmond to finish 6th in the standings.

In 2017, Hamlin won at the first New Hampshire race, and Darlington and finished 6th in points for the second straight year.

Hamlin started the 2018 season with a third-place finish at the Daytona 500. However, for the first time in his career, he finished a season winless. Despite this, he stayed consistent enough to make the Playoffs. Hamlin was eliminated in the Round of 16 after the Charlotte Roval race and finished the season 11th in points.

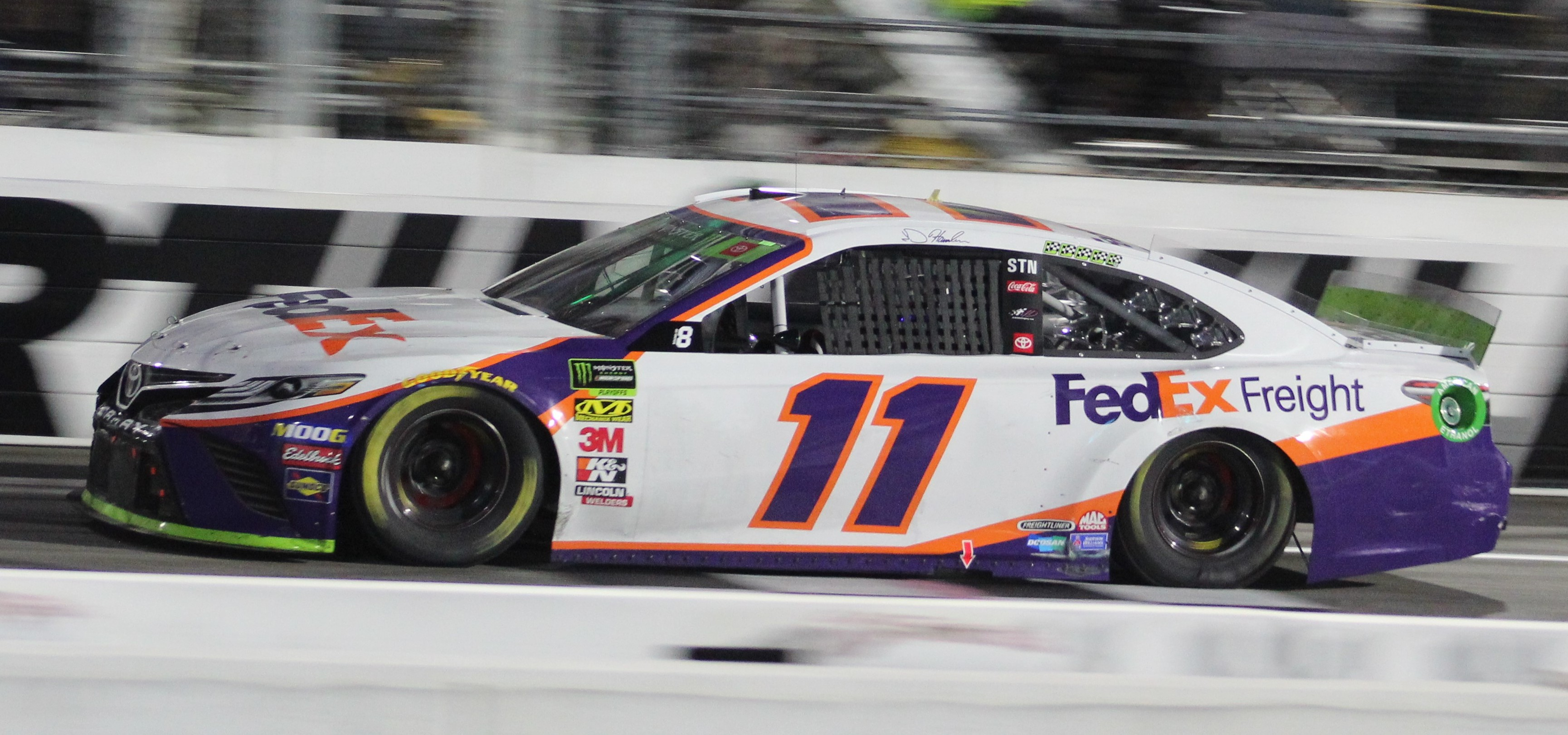
Hamlin at Martinsville Speedway in 2019

Hamlin started the 2019 season with his second Daytona 500 win after surviving a mass pile-up with 10 laps to go in the race. The win was about a month after the passing of J. D. Gibbs. Hamlin celebrated by performing a slow lap of honor instead of a burnout to preserve the car. He scored his second win of the season at Texas. At Martinsville, Hamlin collided with Logano on turn four, squeezing Logano into the outside wall and causing him to lose a tire and spin out two laps later. Hamlin finished fourth while Logano salvaged an eighth-place finish. After the race, Hamlin and Logano discussed the incident before Logano slapped Hamlin's right shoulder, sparking a fight between the two. NASCAR suspended Dave Nichols Jr., the No. 22 team's tire technician, for one race for pulling Hamlin down to the ground during the altercation. Hamlin would make the Championship 4 for the first time since 2014 as well as earn his fourth pole at Homestead after qualifying got canceled due to rain, but finished 10th in the race and fourth in the final standings.

Hamlin started the 2020 season by winning the 2020 Daytona 500, becoming only the fourth driver to win back-to-back Daytona 500s after Richard Petty, Cale Yarborough, and Sterling Marlin. Before the Las Vegas race, the team was docked 10 driver and owner points for an L1 level penalty during pre-race inspection. Following the 2020 Coca-Cola 600, crew chief Chris Gabehart, car chief Brandon Griffeth, and engineer Scott Simmons were suspended for four races after a tungsten ballast came loose and fell off the frame rail of the car during the start of the race. Hamlin once again made the Championship 4 and had a more competitive race for the championship than in the previous year, but still finished fourth in the race and final standings behind 3rd-place finisher Joey Logano, runner-up Brad Keselowski, and Champion Chase Elliott.

In 2021 Hamlin went winless during the regular season but stayed very consistent scoring 13 top fives and 17 top tens. He scored his first win of the season in the first playoff race at Darlington and then won again at Las Vegas. Hamlin made the final four for the third straight year but once again came up short finishing 3rd in points behind runner-up and teammate Martin Truex Jr and champion Kyle Larson.

Hamlin started the 2022 season with a 37th-place finish at the 2022 Daytona 500. Aside from a win at Richmond, he struggled with finishes outside the top 10 during the first 11 races. On May 3, Gabehart was suspended for four races due to a tire and wheel loss at Dover. On May 29, Hamlin won the 2022 Coca-Cola 600 for his second win of the season. He won at Pocono, but was disqualified and the No. 11 team was served an L1 penalty after a post-race inspection revealed an alteration to the car's front fascia. It was revealed that the lower corners and wheel openings of the front fascia were wrapped with a layer of clear vinyl that was not removed prior to the application of the paint scheme wrap, resulting in a slight irregularity in the car's dimensions. Hamlin became the first NASCAR Cup Series winner to be disqualified since 1960, when Emanuel Zervakis was stripped of his win at Wilson Speedway for an oversized fuel tank. Hamlin was eliminated following the Round of 8 after finishing sixth at Martinsville.

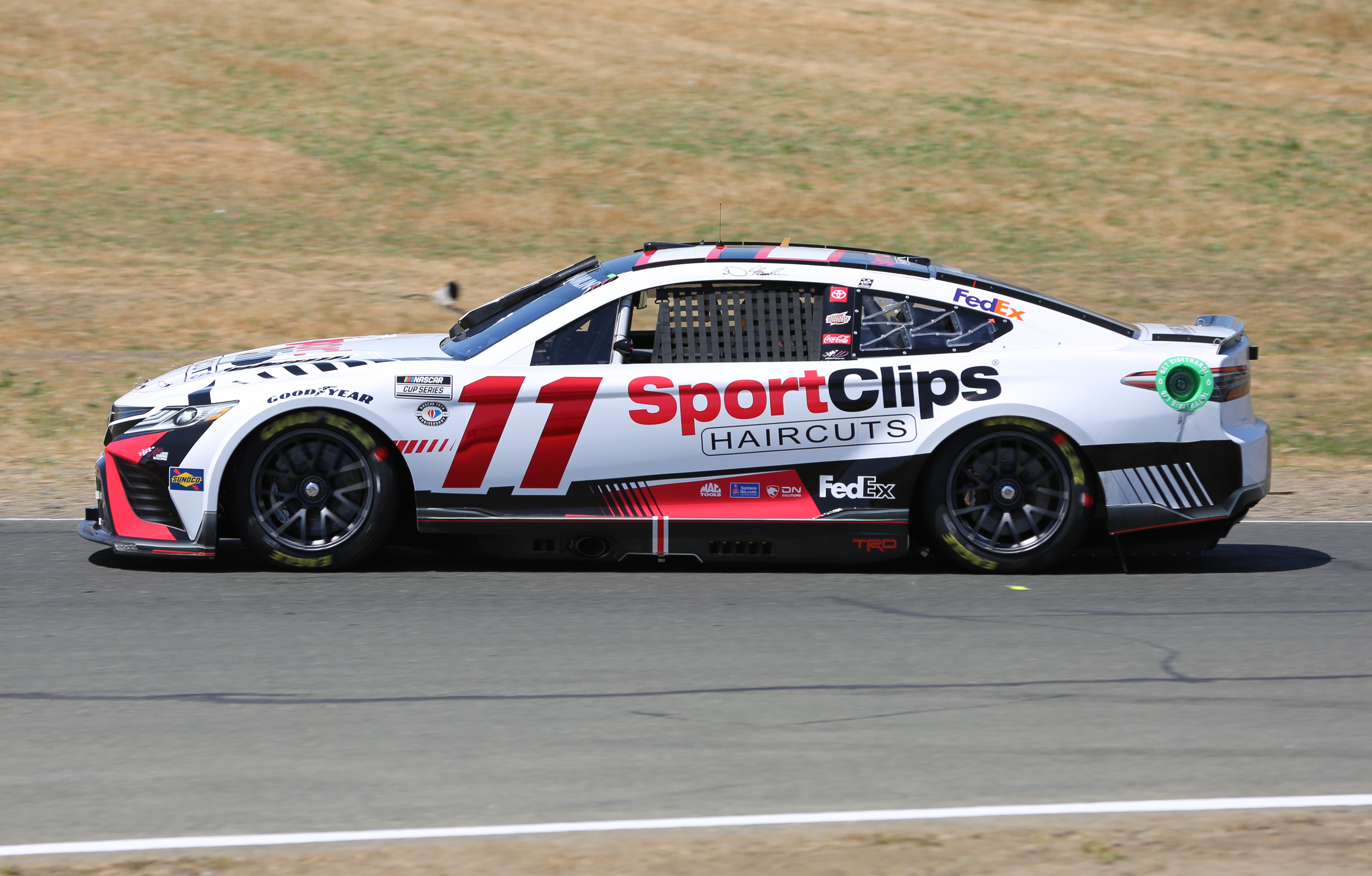
Denny Hamlin in the No. 11 at Sonoma Raceway in 2023

Hamlin began the 2023 season with a 17th-place finish at the 2023 Daytona 500. On March 15, he was docked 25 points and fined US$50,000 after admitting on his weekly podcast Actions Detrimental that he intentionally wrecked Chastain during the closing laps of the Phoenix race. In April, Hamlin was named as one of NASCAR's 75 Greatest Drivers. Hamlin won at Kansas after a tense battle with Kyle Larson, who got loose and hit the outside wall on the final lap allowing Hamlin to pass him for the win, winning the 400th career race for Joe Gibbs Racing in the process. At Charlotte, Hamlin was right rear hooked to the outside wall by Elliott; as a result, Elliott was suspended for one race. On July 23, Hamlin won at Pocono; it was his second win of the 2023 season and his seventh at Pocono Raceway, breaking a tie with Jeff Gordon for the most wins at the track. It was also Hamlin's 50th win in his Cup Series career and Toyota's overall 600th win. In addition, it was the first win for sponsor Mavis Tires & Brakes, who had only started sponsoring Hamlin a week earlier at New Hampshire. During the playoffs, Hamlin advanced to the Round of 12 after winning at Bristol.

Hamlin started the 2024 season with a win at the 2024 Busch Light Clash at The Coliseum. He later scored wins at Bristol, Richmond and Dover. On August 22, the No. 11 was issued an L2 penalty for an engine inspection violation after TRD admitted that the race-winning engine from Bristol was returned to their facility in Costa Mesa, California and rebuilt instead of being torn down and inspected by NASCAR after the race. As a result, the team was docked 75 owner and driver points and 10 playoff points, and Gabehart was fined US$100,000. Hamlin was winless during the playoffs and finished eighth in the points standings. At the end of the season, it was announced that FedEx will not return to JGR in 2025, after 20 years of sponsoring the No. 11. On November 22, JGR promoted Gabehart to competition director while Chris Gayle was named the new crew chief of the No. 11 car starting in 2025.

Hamlin started the 2025 season with a 24th place finish at the 2025 Daytona 500. On March 18, Progressive Insurance signed a deal to be the primary sponsor of the No. 11 car for 18 races during the season. Later that month, Hamlin won at Martinsville, his first win at the track in a decade. Upon his win, Hamlin waved a flag that read: "11 against the world", a nod to the Ohio State Buckeyes and a reference to his involvement in 23XI Racing and Front Row Motorsports' antitrust lawsuit against NASCAR. During the season, he also scored wins at Darlington and Michigan. With Hamlin missing the Mexico City race due to the birth of his son, Ryan Truex drove the No. 11 car to a 23rd place finish. On July 20, Hamlin scored his fourth win of the season at Dover. During the playoffs, Hamlin won at Gateway and Las Vegas to make the Championship 4. Despite a strong showing at Phoenix, he finished sixth due to strategic pit errors; as a result, Hamlin lost to Larson for the 2025 championship by three points.

Hamlin started the 2026 season with a 31st place finish at the 2026 Daytona 500. A month later, he scored his 61st career win at Las Vegas. Hamlin also won the All-Star Race for the first time since 2015. He continued his run with three straight wins at Nashville, Michigan, and Pocono.

==== Car No. 11 results ====
Year	Driver	No.	Make	1	2	3	4	5	6	7	8	9	10	11	12	13	14	15	16	17	18	19	20	21	22	23	24	25	26	27	28	29	30	31	32	33	34	35	36	Owners	Pts
2004	J. J. Yeley	11	Chevy	DAY	CAR	LVS	ATL	DAR	BRI	TEX	MAR	TAL	CAL	RCH	CLT	DOV	POC	MCH	SON	DAY	CHI	NHA	POC	IND	GLN	MCH; DNQ	BRI	CAL; 41	RCH	NHA	DOV					ATL; 27	PHO	DAR	HOM; DNQ	59th	227
2004	Ricky Craven	11	Chevy																													TAL; 30	KAN	CLT	MAR					59th	227
2005	Jason Leffler	11	Chevy	DAY; 36	CAL; 37	LVS; 22	ATL; 25	BRI; 38	MAR; 12	TEX; 36	PHO; 29	TAL; 26	DAR; 38	RCH; 25	CLT; DNQ	DOV; 20	POC; 40	MCH; 20		DAY; 18	CHI; 20	NHA; 24	POC; 24	IND; 33																33rd	3098
2005	Terry Labonte	11	Chevy																SON; 12						GLN; 37	MCH; 40	BRI; 27		RCH; 9											33rd	3098
2005	J. J. Yeley	11	Chevy																									CAL; 39		NHA; 34	DOV; 25	TAL; 29								33rd	3098
2005	Denny Hamlin	11	Chevy																														KAN; 32	CLT; 8	MAR; 8	ATL; 19	TEX; 7	PHO; 13	HOM; 33	33rd	3098
2006	Denny Hamlin	11	Chevy	DAY; 30	CAL; 12	LVS; 10	ATL; 31	BRI; 14	MAR; 37	TEX; 4	PHO; 34	TAL; 22	RCH; 2	DAR; 10	CLT; 9	DOV; 11	POC; 1	MCH; 12	SON; 12	DAY; 17	CHI; 14	NHA; 6	POC; 1	IND; 10	GLN; 10	MCH; 9	BRI; 6	CAL; 6	RCH; 15	NHA; 4	DOV; 9	KAN; 18	TAL; 21	CLT; 28	MAR; 2	ATL; 8	TEX; 10	PHO; 3	HOM; 3	3rd	6407
2007	Denny Hamlin	11	Chevy	DAY; 28	CAL; 11	LVS; 3	ATL; 19	BRI; 14	MAR; 3	TEX; 9	PHO; 3	TAL; 21	RCH; 3	DAR; 2	CLT; 9	DOV; 4	POC; 6	MCH; 14	SON; 10	NHA; 1	DAY; 43	CHI; 17	IND; 22	POC; 3	GLN; 2	MCH; 5	BRI; 43	CAL; 19	RCH; 6	NHA; 15	DOV; 38	KAN; 29	TAL; 4	CLT; 20	MAR; 6	ATL; 24	TEX; 29	PHO; 16	HOM; 3	12th	6143
2008	Denny Hamlin	11	Toyota	DAY; 17	CAL; 41	LVS; 9	ATL; 15	BRI; 6	MAR; 1	TEX; 5	PHO; 3	TAL; 3	RCH; 24	DAR; 7	CLT; 24	DOV; 43	POC; 3	MCH; 14	SON; 27	NHA; 8	DAY; 26	CHI; 40	IND; 3	POC; 23	GLN; 8	MCH; 39	BRI; 3	CAL; 3	RCH; 3	NHA; 9	DOV; 38	KAN; 11	TAL; 39	CLT; 16	MAR; 5	ATL; 3	TEX; 17	PHO; 5	HOM; 13	8th	6214
2009	Denny Hamlin	11	Toyota	DAY; 26	CAL; 6	LVS; 22	ATL; 13	BRI; 2	MAR; 2	TEX; 12	PHO; 6	TAL; 22	RCH; 14	DAR; 13	CLT; 11	DOV; 36	POC; 38	MCH; 3	SON; 5	NHA; 15	DAY; 3	CHI; 5	IND; 34	POC; 1	GLN; 10	MCH; 10	BRI; 5	ATL; 6	RCH; 1	NHA; 2	DOV; 22	KAN; 5	CAL; 37	CLT; 42	MAR; 1	TAL; 38	TEX; 2	PHO; 3	HOM; 1	5th	6335
2010	Denny Hamlin	11	Toyota	DAY; 17	CAL; 29	LVS; 19	ATL; 21	BRI; 19	MAR; 1	PHO; 30	TEX; 1	TAL; 4	RCH; 11	DAR; 1	DOV; 4	CLT; 18	POC; 1	MCH; 1	SON; 34	NHA; 14	DAY; 24	CHI; 8	IND; 15	POC; 5	GLN; 37	MCH; 2	BRI; 34	ATL; 43	RCH; 1	NHA; 2	DOV; 9	KAN; 12	CAL; 8	CLT; 4	MAR; 1	TAL; 9	TEX; 1	PHO; 12	HOM; 14	2nd	6583
2011	Denny Hamlin	11	Toyota	DAY; 21	PHO; 11	LVS; 7	BRI; 33	CAL; 39	MAR; 12	TEX; 15	TAL; 23	RCH; 2	DAR; 6	DOV; 16	CLT; 10	KAN; 3	POC; 19	MCH; 1	SON; 37	DAY; 13	KEN; 11	NHA; 3	IND; 27	POC; 15	GLN; 36	MCH; 35	BRI; 7	ATL; 8	RCH; 9	CHI; 31	NHA; 29	DOV; 18	KAN; 16	CLT; 9	TAL; 8	MAR; 5	TEX; 20	PHO; 12	HOM; 9	9th	2284
2012	Denny Hamlin	11	Toyota	DAY; 4	PHO; 1	LVS; 20	BRI; 20	CAL; 11	MAR; 6	TEX; 12	KAN; 1	RCH; 4	TAL; 23	DAR; 2	CLT; 2	DOV; 18	POC; 5	MCH; 34	SON; 35	KEN; 3	DAY; 25	NHA; 2	IND; 6	POC; 29	GLN; 34	MCH; 11	BRI; 1	ATL; 1*	RCH; 18*	CHI; 16	NHA; 1*	DOV; 8	TAL; 14	CLT; 2	KAN; 13	MAR; 33	TEX; 20	PHO; 2	HOM; 24	6th	2329
2013	Denny Hamlin	11	Toyota	DAY; 14	PHO; 3	LVS; 15	BRI; 23	CAL; 25					TAL; 34	DAR; 2	CLT; 4	DOV; 34	POC; 8	MCH; 30	SON; 23	KEN; 35	DAY; 36	NHA; 21	IND; 18	POC; 43	GLN; 19	MCH; 20	BRI; 28	ATL; 38	RCH; 21	CHI; 33	NHA; 12	DOV; 20	KAN; 23	CLT; 9	TAL; 38	MAR; 7	TEX; 7	PHO; 28	HOM; 1	25th	845
2013	Mark Martin	11	Toyota						MAR; 10																															25th	845
2013	Brian Vickers	11	Toyota							TEX; 8	KAN; 31	RCH; 35																												25th	845
2014	Denny Hamlin	11	Toyota	DAY; 2	PHO; 19	LVS; 12	BRI; 6		MAR; 19	TEX; 13	DAR; 19	RCH; 22	TAL; 1	KAN; 18	CLT; 22	DOV; 5	POC; 4	MCH; 29	SON; 26	KEN; 42	DAY; 6	NHA; 8	IND; 3	POC; 9	GLN; 24	MCH; 7	BRI; 40	ATL; 3	RCH; 21	CHI; 6	NHA; 37	DOV; 12	KAN; 7	CLT; 9	TAL; 18	MAR; 8	TEX; 10	PHO; 5	HOM; 7	3rd	5037
2014	Sam Hornish Jr.	11	Toyota					CAL; 17																																3rd	5037
2015	Denny Hamlin	11	Toyota	DAY; 4	ATL; 38	LVS; 5	PHO; 23	CAL; 28	MAR; 1	TEX; 11	BRI; 26	RCH; 22	TAL; 9	KAN; 41	CLT; 8	DOV; 21	POC; 10	MCH; 11	SON; 18	DAY; 3	KEN; 3	NHA; 14	IND; 5	POC; 22	GLN; 27	MCH; 5	BRI; 3	DAR; 3	RCH; 6	CHI; 1	NHA; 2	DOV; 18	CLT; 4	KAN; 2	TAL; 37	MAR; 3	TEX; 38	PHO; 8	HOM; 10	9th	2327
2016	Denny Hamlin	11	Toyota	DAY; 1*	ATL; 16	LVS; 19	PHO; 3	CAL; 3	MAR; 39	TEX; 12	BRI; 20	RCH; 6	TAL; 31	KAN; 37	DOV; 7	CLT; 4	POC; 14	MCH; 33	SON; 2*	DAY; 17	KEN; 15	NHA; 9	IND; 4	POC; 7	GLN; 1	BRI; 3	MCH; 9	DAR; 4	RCH; 1	CHI; 6	NHA; 15	DOV; 9	CLT; 30	KAN; 15	TAL; 3	MAR; 3	TEX; 9	PHO; 7	HOM; 9	6th	2320
2017	Denny Hamlin	11	Toyota	DAY; 17	ATL; 38	LVS; 6	PHO; 10	CAL; 14	MAR; 30	TEX; 25	BRI; 10	RCH; 3	TAL; 11	KAN; 23	CLT; 5	DOV; 8	POC; 12	MCH; 4	SON; 4	DAY; 24	KEN; 4	NHA; 1	IND; 17	POC; 4	GLN; 4	MCH; 16	BRI; 3	DAR; 1*	RCH; 5	CHI; 4	NHA; 12	DOV; 35	CLT; 4	TAL; 6	KAN; 5	MAR; 7	TEX; 3	PHO; 35*	HOM; 9	6th	2353
2018	Denny Hamlin	11	Toyota	DAY; 3	ATL; 4	LVS; 17	PHO; 4	CAL; 6	MAR; 12	TEX; 34	BRI; 14	RCH; 3	TAL; 14	DOV; 7	KAN; 5	CLT; 3	POC; 35	MCH; 12	SON; 10	CHI; 7	DAY; 38	KEN; 16	NHA; 13	POC; 10	GLN; 13	MCH; 8	BRI; 14	DAR; 10	IND; 3*	LVS; 32	RCH; 16	ROV; 12	DOV; 2	TAL; 4	KAN; 14	MAR; 2	TEX; 30	PHO; 13	HOM; 12	11th	2285
2019	Denny Hamlin	11	Toyota	DAY; 1	ATL; 11	LVS; 10	PHO; 5	CAL; 7	MAR; 5	TEX; 1	BRI; 5	RCH; 5	TAL; 36	DOV; 21	KAN; 16	CLT; 17	POC; 6	MCH; 11	SON; 5	CHI; 15	DAY; 26	KEN; 5	NHA; 2	POC; 1	GLN; 3	MCH; 2	BRI; 1	DAR; 29	IND; 6	LVS; 15	RCH; 3	ROV; 19	DOV; 5*	TAL; 3	KAN; 1*	MAR; 4	TEX; 28	PHO; 1*	HOM; 10	4th	5027
2020	Denny Hamlin	11	Toyota	DAY; 1*	LVS; 17	CAL; 6	PHO; 20	DAR; 5	DAR; 1	CLT; 29	CLT; 2	BRI; 17*	ATL; 5	MAR; 24	HOM; 1*	TAL; 4	POC; 2	POC; 1*	IND; 28	KEN; 12	TEX; 20	KAN; 1*	NHA; 2	MCH; 6	MCH; 2	DRC; 2	DOV; 1*	DOV; 19	DAY; 3	DAR; 13	RCH; 12	BRI; 21	LVS; 3*	TAL; 1	ROV; 15	KAN; 15	TEX; 9	MAR; 11	PHO; 4	4th	5033
2021	Denny Hamlin	11	Toyota	DAY; 5*	DRC; 3	HOM; 11	LVS; 4	PHO; 3	ATL; 4	BRD; 3	MAR; 3*	RCH; 2*	TAL; 32*	KAN; 12	DAR; 5	DOV; 7	COA; 14	CLT; 7	SON; 8	NSH; 21	POC; 4	POC; 14	ROA; 5	ATL; 13	NHA; 10	GLN; 5	IRC; 23	MCH; 5	DAY; 13	DAR; 1	RCH; 2*	BRI; 9	LVS; 1*	TAL; 7	ROV; 5	TEX; 11	KAN; 5	MAR; 24	PHO; 3	3rd	5034
2022	Denny Hamlin	11	Toyota	DAY; 37	CAL; 15	LVS; 32	PHO; 13	ATL; 29	COA; 18	RCH; 1	MAR; 28	BRD; 35	TAL; 18	DOV; 21	DAR; 21	KAN; 4	CLT; 1	GTW; 34	SON; 31	NSH; 6*	ROA; 17	ATL; 25	NHA; 6	POC; 35	IRC; 14	MCH; 3*	RCH; 4	GLN; 20	DAY; 25	DAR; 2	KAN; 2	BRI; 9	TEX; 10	TAL; 5	ROV; 13	LVS; 5	HOM; 7	MAR; 5*	PHO; 8	5th	2379
2023	Denny Hamlin	11	Toyota	DAY; 17	CAL; 6	LVS; 11	PHO; 23	ATL; 6	COA; 16	RCH; 20	BRD; 22	MAR; 4	TAL; 17	DOV; 5	KAN; 1	DAR; 12	CLT; 35	GTW; 2	SON; 36	NSH; 3	CSC; 11	ATL; 14	NHA; 7	POC; 1	RCH; 2	MCH; 3	IRC; 19	GLN; 2	DAY; 26	DAR; 25*	KAN; 2	BRI; 1	TEX; 5	TAL; 3	ROV; 37	LVS; 10	HOM; 30	MAR; 3*	PHO; 8	5th	2383
2024	Denny Hamlin	11	Toyota	DAY; 19	ATL; 23	LVS; 8	PHO; 11*	BRI; 1*	COA; 14	RCH; 1	MAR; 11	TEX; 30	TAL; 37	DOV; 1*	KAN; 5*	DAR; 4	CLT; 5	GTW; 2	SON; 38	IOW; 24	NHA; 24	NSH; 12	CSC; 30	POC; 2	IND; 32	RCH; 2*	MCH; 9	DAY; 38	DAR; 7	ATL; 24	GLN; 23	BRI; 4	KAN; 8	TAL; 10	ROV; 14	LVS; 8	HOM; 3	MAR; 5	PHO; 11	8th	2328
2025	Denny Hamlin	11	Toyota	DAY; 24	ATL; 6	COA; 21	PHO; 2	LVS; 25	HOM; 5	MAR; 1*	DAR; 1	BRI; 2	TAL; 21	TEX; 38	KAN; 36	CLT; 16	NSH; 3	MCH; 1		POC; 2	ATL; 31	CSC; 4	SON; 20	DOV; 1	IND; 3	IOW; 24	GLN; 25	RCH; 10	DAY; 25	DAR; 7	GTW; 1*	BRI; 31	NHA; 12	KAN; 2*	ROV; 23	LVS; 1	TAL; 24	MAR; 35	PHO; 6*	2nd	5031
2025	Ryan Truex	11	Toyota																MXC; 23																					2nd	5031
2026	Denny Hamlin	11	Toyota	DAY; 31	ATL; 13	COA; 10	PHO; 5	LVS; 1*	DAR; 11	MAR; 2*	BRI; 9	KAN; 4*	TAL; 15	TEX; 2	GLN; 16	CLT; 3	NSH; 1*	MCH; 1	POC; 1	COR; 14	SON; 26	CHI; 3	ATL; 12	NWS; 2	IND; 5	IOW; 5	RCH; 4	NHA; 7	DAY; 11	DAR; 18	GTW; 9	BRI; 8	KAN; 3	LVS; 16	CLT; 5	PHO; 28	TAL; 8	MAR; 6	HOM; 6*	3rd	2445
2027	Denny Hamlin	11	Toyota	DAY	ATL	COA	PHO	LVS	DAR	BRI	MAR	TAL	TEX	KAN	DOV	CLT	NSH	POC	MCH	CHI	IOW	SON	ATL	IND	COR	BRI	GTW	DAY	DAR	RCH	GLN	NHA	KAN	LVS	CLT	PHO	TAL	MAR	HOM	-	-

=== Car No. 18 history ===
Dale Jarrett (1992–1994)

Joe Gibbs Racing debuted at the 1992 Daytona 500 with second-generation driver Dale Jarrett driving the No. 18 Interstate Batteries-sponsored Chevrolet Lumina to a 36th-place finish after a crash. The team improved dramatically the next year when Jarrett won the Daytona 500 and finished a then career-high 4th in points. Jarrett won a race at Charlotte but he slipped to 16th in points in 1994 and moved to Robert Yates Racing's famed 28 car for 1995.

Bobby Labonte (1995–2005)

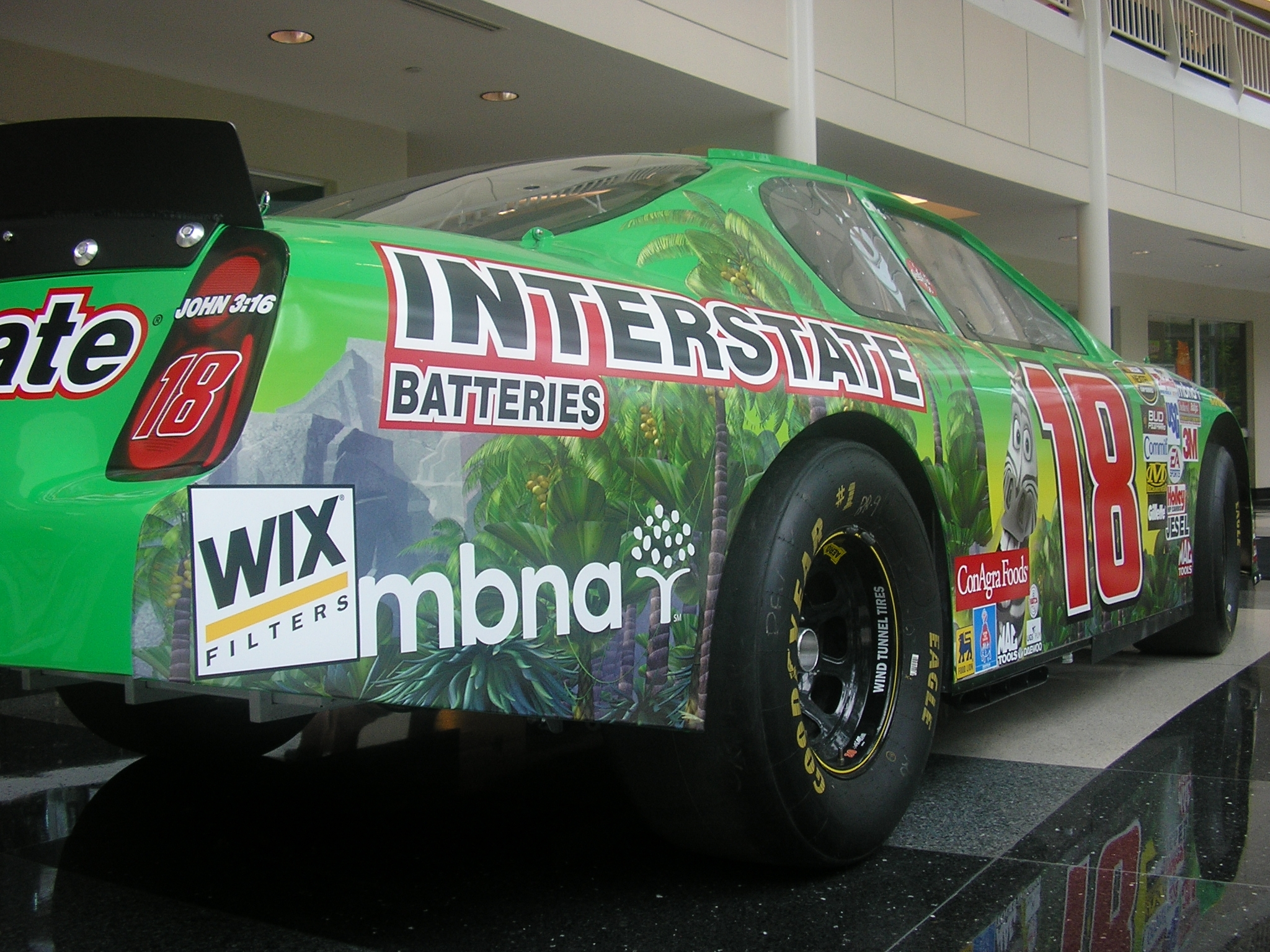
Bobby Labonte's former Interstate Batteries Chevrolet Monte Carlo on display at JGR headquarters.

The team replaced Jarrett with Bobby Labonte, younger brother of Terry Labonte and 1993 Rookie of the Year runner-up. In 1995, Labonte won 3 races, sweeping both Michigan events and winning at Charlotte, finishing 10th in points. This would mark the beginning of a decade of success between Labonte, Joe Gibbs Racing, and Interstate Batteries. In 1996 the team struggled to win until the season finale at Atlanta and finished 11th in points. In 1997 the team had a similar year to the previous but managed to improve to 7th in points. Their lone win came at the season finale. The team improved in 1998 by winning races at Atlanta and Talladega en route to 6th place in points.

1999 was a breakout year for the No. 18 team. They scored 5 wins which came at Dover, Michigan, Atlanta and both races at Pocono. The team came just short of the championship and finished 2nd in points to Jarrett, once again at Atlanta. The team continued their success in the next season, winning the second race of the season at Rockingham. Labonte's next win was the Brickyard 400 at the famed Indianapolis Motor Speedway. His third win came at the Southern 500 at Darlington recovering from a hard practice crash and taking the lead on a late race pit stop to win the rain and darkness shortened event. His fourth and final win of the year came at Charlotte a month later. Labonte would hold the points lead for 25 consecutive races to win the 2000 NASCAR Winston Cup Series Championship.

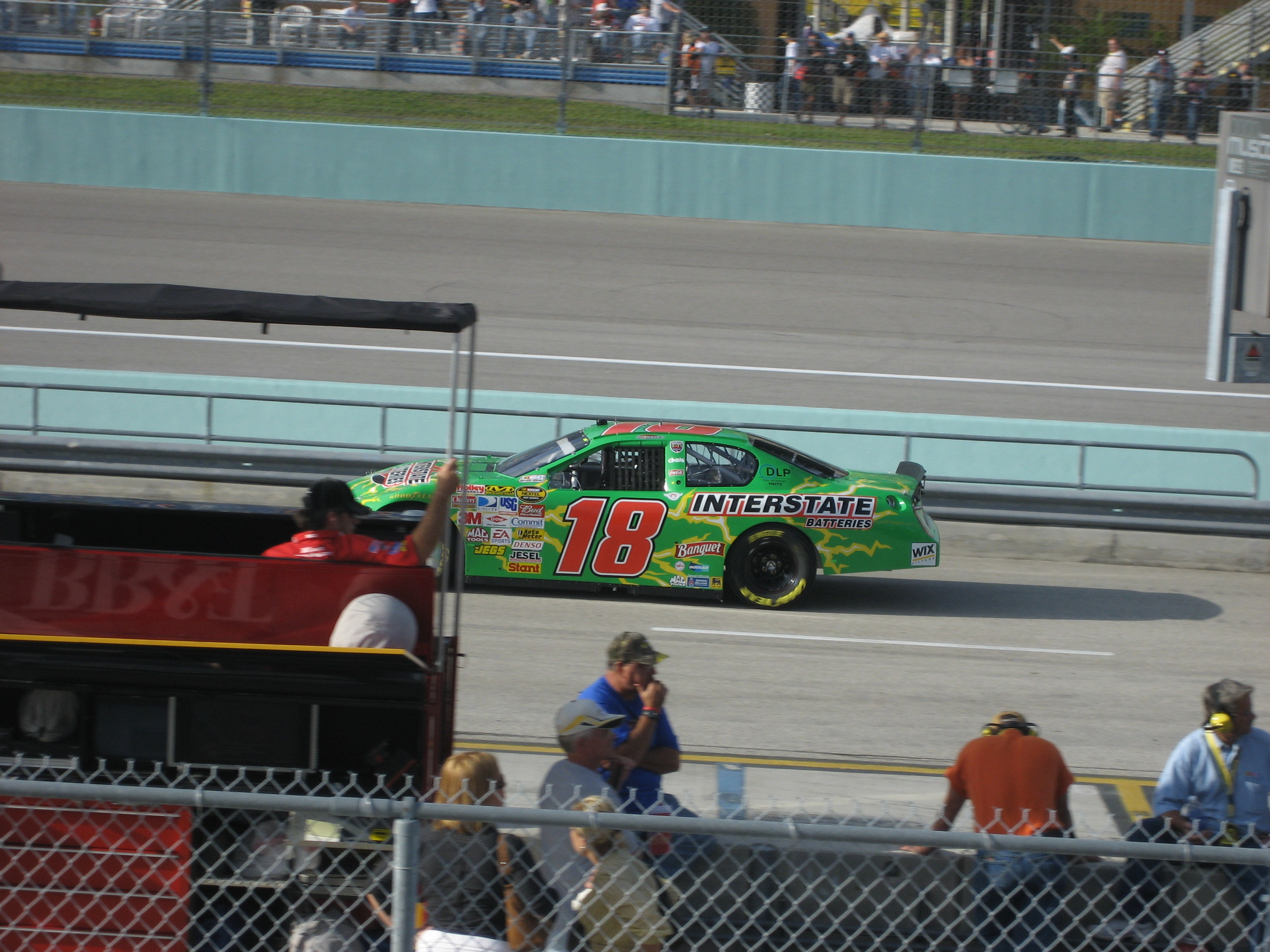
J. J. Yeley at Homestead Miami Speedway in 2007

The team faced disappointment in 2001 after high expectations following the championship season, winning only 2 races at Pocono and Atlanta and finishing 6th in points. 2002 was the team's worst year since Labonte joined the team, scoring only one win at Martinsville and finishing a disappointing 16th in points. The team rebounded in 2003 scoring 2 wins at Atlanta and Homestead to finish 8th in points. Even though the team made some progression in 2004, the team fired crew chief Michael "Fatback" McSwain midseason, with Brandon Thomas taking over for the rest of the year. The team went winless to finish 12th in points. Steve Addington, a Gibbs Busch Series crew chief, was named new crew chief for the 2005 season, but a rash of troubles, some caused by mechanical problems, continued to daunt the team. The high point of the year was the Coca-Cola 600 when he finished second to Jimmie Johnson by half a car length. Labonte finished 24th in the championship standings, and the team's regression led to his departure following the end of 2005. Bobby Labonte earned all 21 of his career Cup Series wins in the car, as well as the Winston Cup championship in 2000. He would depart for the 43 car of Petty Enterprises.

J. J. Yeley (2006–2007)

After Labonte's departure, Gibbs announced that JGR Busch Series driver and former USAC standout J. J. Yeley would replace him in the No. 18 for 2006, joining fellow rookie teammate Denny Hamlin. Yeley had a dismal rookie season with only three top tens while failing to finish seven races, leading to 29th-place points finish. Yeley's sophomore campaign was only slightly better, earning a pole at Michigan and scoring three more top tens to finish 21st in points. Yeley moved to JGR-affiliated Hall of Fame Racing for 2008.

Kyle Busch (2008–2022)

On August 14, 2007, it was announced that 22-year-old Kyle Busch had signed a contract to drive the number 18 with Joe Gibbs Racing through 2010, leaving Hendrick Motorsports' number 5 car after a successful but controversial tenure with the organization. Mars, Incorporated's M&M's brand was signed as the team's primary sponsor, leaving Robert Yates Racing, while longtime partner Interstate Batteries scaled down to be a secondary sponsor and six race primary sponsor. Joe Gibbs racing also left General Motors in favor of becoming Toyota's highest-profile team. Busch gave Toyota its first Cup win on March 9, 2008, leading a race-high 173 laps to win the Kobalt Tools 500 at Atlanta Motor Speedway. In his first year in the 18, Busch had brought the car back to its former glory, winning 7 additional races (Talladega, Darlington, Dover, Infineon, Daytona, Chicagoland, and Watkins Glen) and would finish tenth in points.

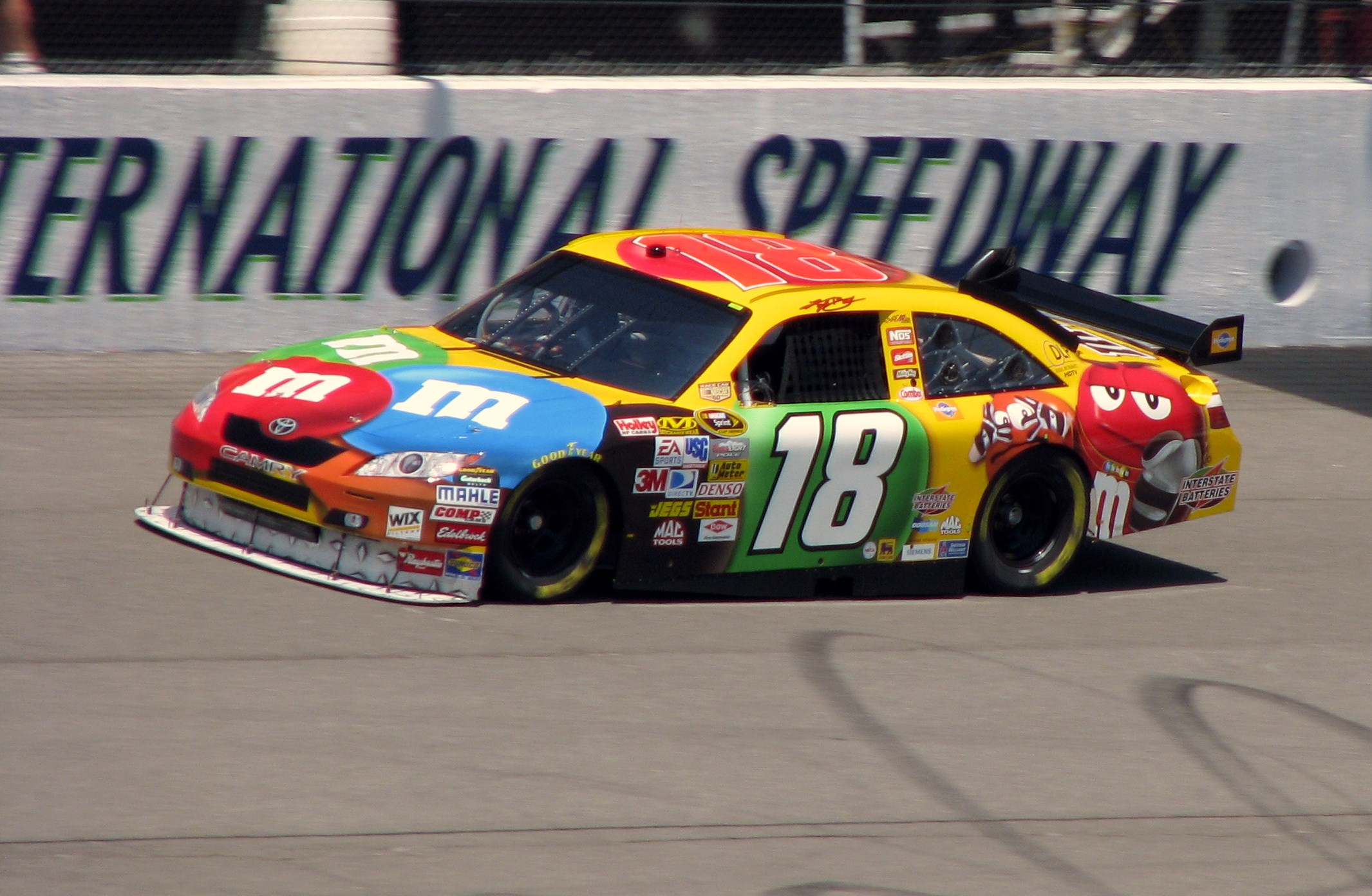
Kyle Busch at Michigan International Speedway in 2008

In 2009, Busch opened the season by winning his Gatorade Duel qualifying race but finished 41st in the race after a crash. He won the third race of the season from the pole at Las Vegas, and scored additional wins at Richmond and both Bristol races, but failed to qualify for the Chase by only 8 points. As a result, longtime JGR crew chief Steve Addington was fired near the end of the season and coincidentally went to crew chief for Kyle's brother Kurt Busch at Penske Racing. Dave Rogers, Busch's Nationwide Series crew chief, took over the pit box in 2010. The year produced 3 victories at Richmond, Dover, and Bristol, but more struggles in the final 10 races led to an 8th-place finish in the standings. 2011 was an up and down year for the 18 team. The team won at Bristol and Richmond early in the season, as well as the inaugural Cup race at Kentucky and the August race at Michigan. At Texas Motor Speedway in November, Busch was parked by NASCAR for the remainder of the race weekend after intentionally spinning out Ron Hornaday in the Truck Series race. Michael McDowell would replace Busch that weekend, finishing a dismal 33rd. Mars, Inc proceeded to pull its sponsorship for the final two races, with Interstate Batteries covering those races. Busch was relegated to twelfth in the final standings.

In 2012, Busch won the Budweiser Shootout to open the season and scored a single points-paying victory, the spring race at Richmond. He would miss making the Chase for the Sprint Cup by 3 points, but scored 7 top 5 and 8 top 10 finishes during the final ten races, finishing the year in 13th place and nearly 100 points ahead of 14th place Ryan Newman. In 2013, Busch won the second Budweiser Duel qualifying race, and won the pole at the spring Bristol race, finishing second. He also swept the spring Fontana and Texas race weekends, winning the Nationwide and Cup races, giving Joe Gibbs his first win at Fontana in Sprint Cup competition and first win for himself at Texas. He would win at Watkins Glen and Atlanta. Busch's four wins and career-high 22 top ten finishes would lead to a fourth-place finish in the championship, the highest of his career. In 2014, Busch earned a spot in the new Chase for the Sprint Cup with his early-season win at Fontana. Busch would be eliminated in the second round, after being swept up in a wreck at Talladega, and would finish tenth in points.

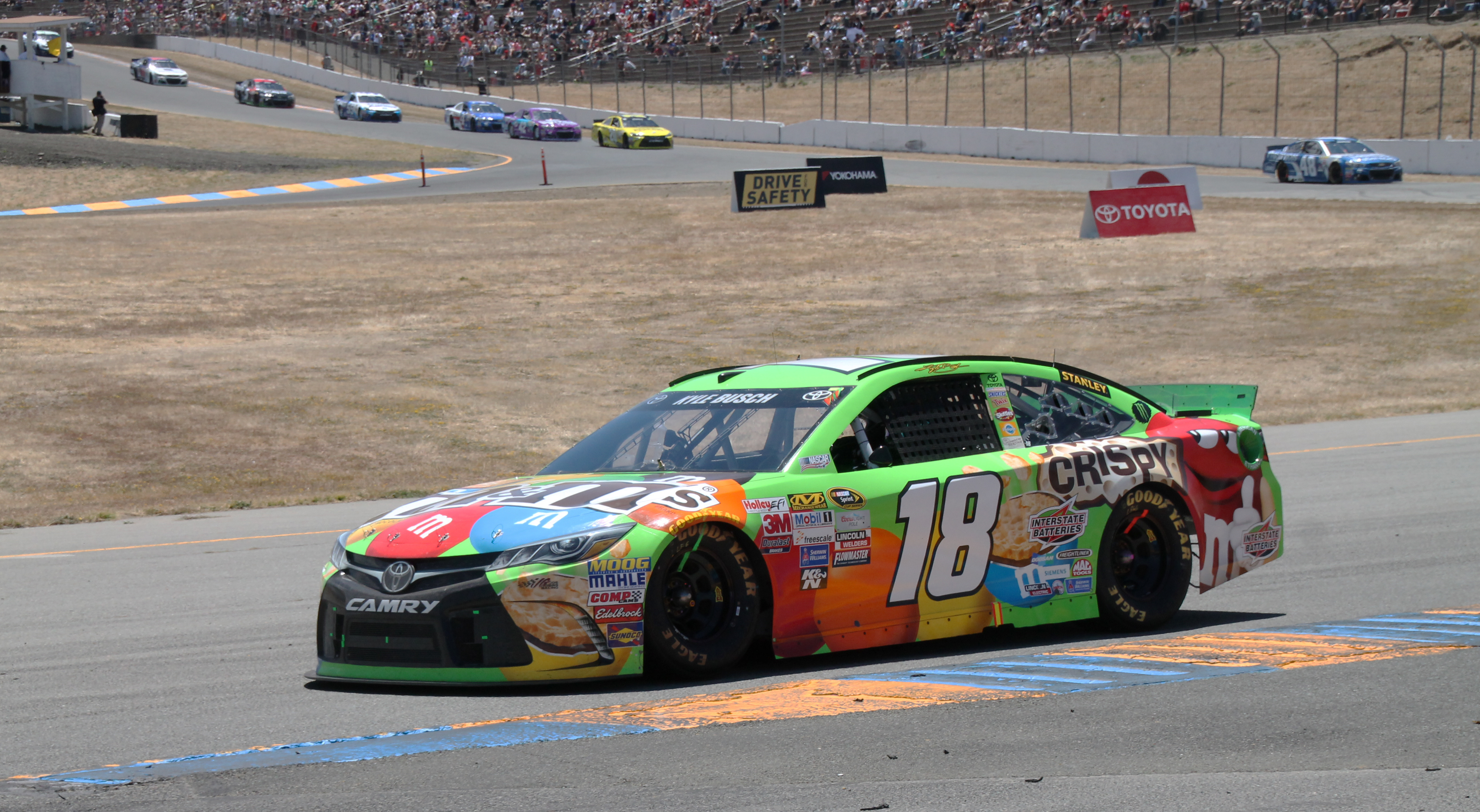
Kyle Busch's race-winning car at Sonoma in 2015.

For 2015, sponsor Mars, Inc. introduced a new green paint scheme to promote Crispy M&M's on the 18 car. After an injury to Kyle Busch in the season-opening Xfinity Series race, the No. 18 started the 2015 season with two-time Truck Series champion Matt Crafton making his Sprint Cup debut at the 2015 Daytona 500, finishing 18th. The next week, David Ragan was announced as interim driver, moving from his full-time ride at Front Row Motorsports. Ragan drove the car for nine races through Talladega and scored a single top-five finish at Martinsville, before moving to Michael Waltrip Racing. Development driver Erik Jones, who drove for Busch in the Truck Series, made his first series start at Kansas. Jones ran in the top ten for much of the race, before crashing on the front stretch and finishing 40th. After missing a total of 11 races, Busch returned to the car for the Sprint All-Star Race at Charlotte, receiving a waiver from NASCAR to be eligible for the Chase for the Sprint Cup provided he win a race and gain a top 30 position in the championship standings. At Sonoma in June, his fifth start of the year, Busch scored his first victory of the season. It was also the first time he and his brother Kurt Busch had finished first and second in any Cup Series event. Busch would then win three consecutive races – Kentucky, New Hampshire, and Indianapolis – with four total wins across a five-race span. The latter victory was also Busch's first Brickyard 400 victory, the first for manufacturer Toyota, and marked the first time a driver swept both the Cup and Xfinity races at Indianapolis. Busch would go on to make the 2015 Chase for the Sprint Cup. At the second Phoenix race, Busch would be one of the four drivers going to Homestead-Miami Speedway with an opportunity to win the Sprint Cup championship after the race was stopped by NASCAR due to rain. The following weekend at Homestead-Miami Speedway, Busch would go on to win the race as well as his first Sprint Cup title. He and brother Kurt join Bobby and Terry Labonte as the only brothers in NASCAR's top series to win championships. This was the 2nd championship for the No. 18 car. Busch ended the season with 5 wins, 12 top fives, and 16 top tens in only 25 starts. It was the first championship for manufacturer Toyota and fourth for team owner Joe Gibbs.

On May 13, 2016, JGR announced that Busch would drive the number 75 car at the All-Star race only, to celebrate M&Ms 75th anniversary.

Busch ended 2016 with four wins, made the Championship 4, and finished third in the final standings.

In 2017, Busch was hampered by bad luck, especially at the beginning of the season as JGR was also having trouble finding speed. However, he picked up steam late in the season and won five races starting at the second Pocono race, a week after being wrecked while leading at Indianapolis. Busch made the Championship 4 again by winning at Martinsville and finished second to Martin Truex Jr. in both the Homestead race and the final standings.

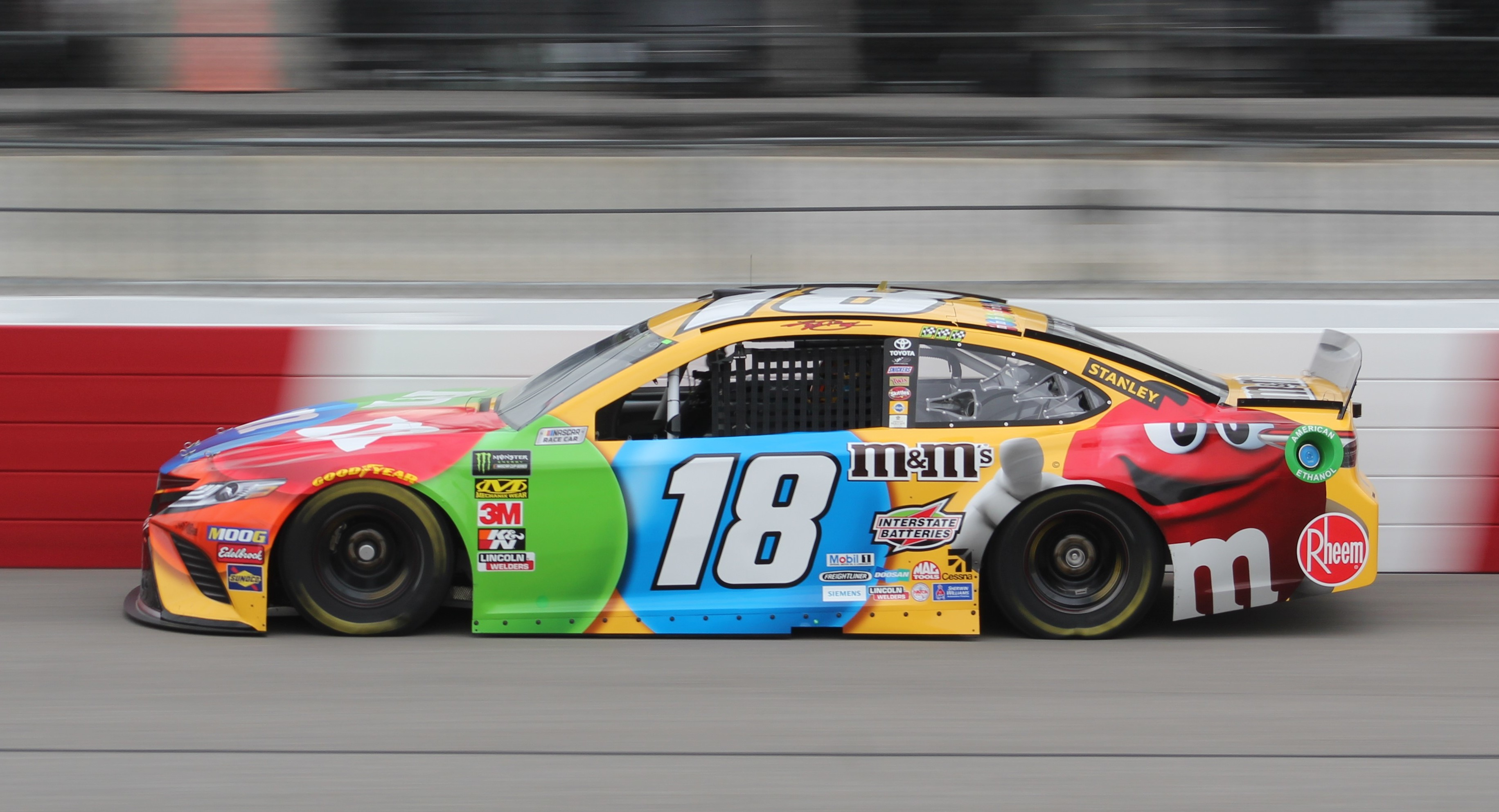
Kyle Busch's No. 18 at Richmond Raceway in 2019

In 2018, Busch had possibly his best season in the cup series, scoring eight wins including three in a row at Texas, Bristol, and Richmond. He also dominated the 2018 Coca-Cola 600 at Charlotte, becoming the first driver to win all four stages. Busch's fifth win came at Chicagoland, where he used a bump and run to beat Kyle Larson on the last lap. His sixth win was the second Pocono race where he beat teammate Daniel Suárez on several late restarts. Busch also won the fall Richmond race to sweep the 2018 Richmond races. His last win was the penultimate race at Phoenix, which clinched his spot in the Championship 4. Unfortunately, at Homestead, his car was noticeably slower than his three competitors for the championship and he finished fourth in the race and the final standings.

Busch started the 2019 season by finishing second at the Daytona 500, behind teammate Denny Hamlin. He had consistent top-10 finishes at Atlanta and Las Vegas before scoring his first win of the season at Phoenix. Busch also won at California and Bristol to maintain his points lead. Following the 2019 Bojangles' Southern 500 at Darlington Raceway, Busch clinched his second consecutive Regular Season Championship. Busch also won the 2019 Ford Ecoboost 400 clinching his second Monster energy NASCAR Cup series title.

Busch started the 2020 season with a 34th-place finish at the Daytona 500. Before the Las Vegas race, the team was docked 10 driver and owner points for an L1 level penalty during pre-race inspection. Busch finished the regular season winless, but stayed consistent enough to make the playoffs. A series of bad finishes at Talladega and the Charlotte Roval resulted in him being eliminated from the round of 8. Despite no longer being a championship factor, Busch won at Texas and finished the season eighth in points. Following the season, Xfinity Series crew chief Ben Beshore replaced Stevens, who was transferred to the No. 20 team driven by Christopher Bell.

After only winning just one race in 2020, Busch opened the 2021 season by winning the Busch Clash on a last-lap pass. Ryan Blaney was leading and Chase Elliott was in second when the two collided on the front-stretch chicane which led to Busch passing both to win his second Busch Clash. He also scored two wins at Kansas and Pocono to make the playoffs. After crashing at the 2021 Cook Out Southern 500, a frustrated Busch ran over several safety cones and nearly hit some people on his way to the garage, landing him a $50,000 fine.

On December 20, 2021, Mars, Inc. announced that it will leave NASCAR following the 2022 season.

Busch started the 2022 season with a second-place finish at the 2022 Busch Light Clash at The Coliseum, losing to Joey Logano after leading 65 of the exhibition race's 150 laps. He finished sixth at the 2022 Daytona 500. Busch won the Bristol dirt race after Tyler Reddick and Chase Briscoe collided with each other for the lead on the final lap. His run at Darlington ended abruptly when Brad Keselowski blew a tire and collided with him. Busch parked his car on pit road and walked off when its front suspension was too damaged for it to return to the garage. Busch finished second at Pocono, but was disqualified and the No. 18 team was served an L1 penalty after a post-race inspection revealed an alteration to the car's front fascia. It was revealed that the lower corners and wheel openings of the front fascia were wrapped with a layer of clear vinyl that was not removed prior to the application of the paint scheme wrap, resulting in a slight irregularity in the car's dimensions. At the Southern 500, Busch led a race-best 155 laps before his engine expired during the final caution, resulting in a 30th-place finish. Busch was eliminated in the Round of 16 after another engine failure at the Bristol night race. On October 18, Beshore was suspended for four races for a loose wheel violation at Las Vegas.

==== Car No. 18 results ====
Year	Driver	No.	Make	1	2	3	4	5	6	7	8	9	10	11	12	13	14	15	16	17	18	19	20	21	22	23	24	25	26	27	28	29	30	31	32	33	34	35	36	Owners	Pts
1992	Dale Jarrett	18	Chevy	DAY; 36	CAR; 37	RCH; 13	ATL; 11	DAR; 21	BRI; 2	NWS; 17	MAR; 28	TAL; 7	CLT; 12	DOV; 27	SON; 39	POC; 22	MCH; 24	DAY; 3	POC; 10	TAL; 21	GLN; 15	MCH; 8	BRI; 17	DAR; 6	RCH; 25	DOV; 12	MAR; 23	NWS; 10	CLT; 24	CAR; 15	PHO; 20	ATL; 10								19th	3251
1993	Dale Jarrett	18	Chevy	DAY; 1	CAR; 6	RCH; 4	ATL; 31	DAR; 3	BRI; 32	NWS; 32	MAR; 3	TAL; 3	SON; 13	CLT; 3	DOV; 2	POC; 19	MCH; 4	DAY; 8	NHA; 4	POC; 8	TAL; 5	GLN; 32	MCH; 4	BRI; 31	DAR; 12	RCH; 14	DOV; 4	MAR; 5	NWS; 9	CLT; 26	CAR; 30	PHO; 16	ATL; 7							4th	4000
1994	Dale Jarrett	18	Chevy	DAY; 35	CAR; 18	RCH; 10	ATL; 35	DAR; 4	BRI; 36	NWS; 25	MAR; 21	TAL; 21	SON; 12	CLT; 4	DOV; 29	POC; 20	MCH; 14	DAY; 11	NHA; 14	POC; 10	TAL; 39	IND; 40	GLN; 11	MCH; 30	BRI; 26	DAR; 9	RCH; 16	DOV; 34	MAR; 5	NWS; DNQ	CLT; 1	CAR; 12	PHO; 9	ATL; 9						16th	3298
1995	Bobby Labonte	18	Chevy	DAY; 30	CAR; 2	RCH; 30	ATL; 2	DAR; 27	BRI; 32	NWS; 15	MAR; 10	TAL; 5	SON; 13	CLT; 1	DOV; 2	POC; 27	MCH; 1	DAY; 41	NHA; 15	POC; 35	TAL; 31	IND; 9	GLN; 6	MCH; 1	BRI; 11	DAR; 8	RCH; 17	DOV; 9	MAR; 14	NWS; 18	CLT; 8	CAR; 40	PHO; 37	ATL; 8						10th	3718
1996	Bobby Labonte	18	Chevy	DAY; 17	CAR; 33	RCH; 23	ATL; 31	DAR; 2	BRI; 7	NWS; 10	MAR; 8	TAL; 24	SON; 9	CLT; 22	DOV; 5	POC; 41	MCH; 12	DAY; 40	NHA; 31	POC; 37	TAL; 8	IND; 24	GLN; 5	MCH; 6	BRI; 32	DAR; 6	RCH; 11	DOV; 4	MAR; 21	NWS; 13	CLT; 40	CAR; 6	PHO; 9	ATL; 1*						11th	3590
1997	Bobby Labonte	18	Pontiac	DAY; 21	CAR; 14	RCH; 8	ATL; 4	DAR; 5	TEX; 3	BRI; 34	MAR; 8	SON; 20	TAL; 3	CLT; 6	DOV; 40	POC; 31	MCH; 9	CAL; 6	DAY; 10	NHA; 27	POC; 11	IND; 2	GLN; 37	MCH; 6	BRI; 8	DAR; 7	RCH; 34	NHA; 15	DOV; 4	MAR; 27	CLT; 2*	TAL; 2	CAR; 11	PHO; 23	ATL; 1*					7th	4101
1998	Bobby Labonte	18	Pontiac	DAY; 2	CAR; 33	LVS; 19	ATL; 1	DAR; 23	BRI; 34	TEX; 8	MAR; 15	TAL; 1	CAL; 38	CLT; 3	DOV; 4	RCH; 8	MCH; 7	POC; 15	SON; 4	NHA; 11	POC; 4	IND; 3	GLN; 10	MCH; 2	BRI; 25	NHA; 7	DAR; 15	RCH; 35	DOV; 4	MAR; 10	CLT; 39	TAL; 6	DAY; 2	PHO; 23	CAR; 15	ATL; 43				6th	4180
1999	Bobby Labonte	18	Pontiac	DAY; 25	CAR; 3	LVS; 5	ATL; 2	DAR; 10	TEX; 3	BRI; 37	MAR; 24	TAL; 4	CAL; 3	RCH; 3	CLT; 2	DOV; 1	MCH; 5	POC; 1	SON; 27	DAY; 5	NHA; 38	POC; 1	IND; 2	GLN; 24	MCH; 1	BRI; 26	DAR; 19	RCH; 2	NHA; 3	DOV; 5	MAR; 8	CLT; 2*	TAL; 7	CAR; 3	PHO; 3	HOM; 2*	ATL; 1*			2nd	5061
2000	Bobby Labonte	18	Pontiac	DAY; 6	CAR; 1*	LVS; 5	ATL; 2	DAR; 13	BRI; 6	TEX; 3	MAR; 12	TAL; 21	CAL; 2	RCH; 26	CLT; 2	DOV; 3	MCH; 3	POC; 13	SON; 4	DAY; 12	NHA; 9	POC; 6	IND; 1	GLN; 5	MCH; 3	BRI; 15	DAR; 1	RCH; 15	NHA; 2	DOV; 5	MAR; 10	CLT; 1	TAL; 12	CAR; 20	PHO; 5	HOM; 4	ATL; 5			1st	5130
2001	Bobby Labonte	18	Pontiac	DAY; 40	CAR; 2	LVS; 29	ATL; 33	DAR; 11	BRI; 13	TEX; 42	MAR; 8	TAL; 5	CAL; 22	RCH; 10	CLT; 5	DOV; 12	MCH; 13	POC; 8	SON; 7	DAY; 5	CHI; 39	NHA; 7	POC; 1	IND; 15	GLN; 9	MCH; 19	BRI; 8	DAR; 3	RCH; 6	DOV; 36	KAN; 29	CLT; 10	MAR; 4	TAL; 22	PHO; 12	CAR; 9	HOM; 8	ATL; 1	NHA; 3	6th	4561
2002	Bobby Labonte	18	Pontiac	DAY; 34	CAR; 3	LVS; 12	ATL; 37	DAR; 21	BRI; 5	TEX; 30	MAR; 1	TAL; 41	CAL; 34	RCH; 32	CLT; 14	DOV; 16	POC; 25	MCH; 24	SON; 13	DAY; 32	CHI; 18	NHA; 13	POC; 11	IND; 11	GLN; 23	MCH; 13	BRI; 9	DAR; 15	RCH; 32	NHA; 5	DOV; 41	KAN; 22	TAL; 25	CLT; 2	MAR; 12	ATL; 13	CAR; 7	PHO; 39	HOM; 29	16th	3810
2003	Bobby Labonte	18	Chevy	DAY; 41	CAR; 16	LVS; 4	ATL; 1*	DAR; 37	BRI; 3	TEX; 37	TAL; 32	MAR; 2	CAL; 2	RCH; 2	CLT; 3	DOV; 3	POC; 17	MCH; 2	SON; 9	DAY; 5	CHI; 36	NHA; 14	POC; 30	IND; 22	GLN; 14	MCH; 37	BRI; 27	DAR; 7	RCH; 6	NHA; 16	DOV; 31	TAL; 11	KAN; 17	CLT; 6	MAR; 41	ATL; 5	PHO; 36	CAR; 8	HOM; 1	8th	4377
2004	Bobby Labonte	18	Chevy	DAY; 11	CAR; 25	LVS; 8	ATL; 18	DAR; 2	BRI; 33	TEX; 25	MAR; 2	TAL; 10	CAL; 5	RCH; 3	CLT; 13	DOV; 25	POC; 3	MCH; 8	SON; 33	DAY; 7	CHI; 18	NHA; 17	POC; 29	IND; 15	GLN; 11	MCH; 26	BRI; 16	CAL; 20	RCH; 16	NHA; 18	DOV; 14	TAL; 35	KAN; 16	CLT; 17	MAR; 18	ATL; 20	PHO; 9	DAR; 9	HOM; 12	12th	4277
2005	Bobby Labonte	18	Chevy	DAY; 43	CAL; 13	LVS; 41	ATL; 37	BRI; 22	MAR; 33	TEX; 38	PHO; 6	TAL; 23	DAR; 17	RCH; 8	CLT; 2	DOV; 38	POC; 26	MCH; 14	SON; 18	DAY; 35	CHI; 13	NHA; 3	POC; 8	IND; 40	GLN; 36	MCH; 16	BRI; 21	CAL; 20	RCH; 22	NHA; 24	DOV; 32	TAL; 11	KAN; 39	CLT; 18	MAR; 4	ATL; 31	TEX; 26	PHO; 5	HOM; 34	24th	3488
2006	J. J. Yeley	18	Chevy	DAY; 41	CAL; 8	LVS; 17	ATL; 15	BRI; 33	MAR; 20	TEX; 35	PHO; 28	TAL; 11	RCH; 22	DAR; 26	CLT; 20	DOV; 42	POC; 15	MCH; 40	SON; 33	DAY; 37	CHI; 10	NHA; 12	POC; 11	IND; 34	GLN; 33	MCH; 37	BRI; 31	CAL; 19	RCH; 13	NHA; 8	DOV; 30	KAN; 41	TAL; 32	CLT; 29	MAR; 31	ATL; 16	TEX; 20	PHO; 20	HOM; 30	29th	3220
2007	J. J. Yeley	18	Chevy	DAY; 12	CAL; 13	LVS; 18	ATL; 22	BRI; 36	MAR; 23	TEX; 43	PHO; 21	TAL; 19	RCH; 14	DAR; 18	CLT; 2	DOV; 37	POC; 17	MCH; 28	SON; 21	NHA; 22	DAY; 20	CHI; 35	IND; 36	POC; 35	GLN; 18	MCH; 25	BRI; 13	CAL; 29	RCH; 10	NHA; 10	DOV; 33	KAN; 14	TAL; 18	CLT; 13	MAR; 42	ATL; 35	TEX; 17	PHO; 14	HOM; 31	21st	3456
2008	Kyle Busch	18	Toyota	DAY; 4*	CAL; 4	LVS; 11	ATL; 1*	BRI; 17	MAR; 38	TEX; 3	PHO; 10	TAL; 1	RCH; 2	DAR; 1*	CLT; 3	DOV; 1	POC; 43	MCH; 13	SON; 1*	NHA; 25	DAY; 1	CHI; 1*	IND; 15	POC; 36	GLN; 1*	MCH; 2	BRI; 2*	CAL; 7	RCH; 15	NHA; 34	DOV; 43	KAN; 28	TAL; 15	CLT; 4	MAR; 29	ATL; 5	TEX; 6	PHO; 8	HOM; 19	10th	6186
2009	Kyle Busch	18	Toyota	DAY; 41*	CAL; 3	LVS; 1	ATL; 18	BRI; 1*	MAR; 24	TEX; 18	PHO; 17	TAL; 25*	RCH; 1	DAR; 34	CLT; 6*	DOV; 23	POC; 22	MCH; 13	SON; 22	NHA; 7	DAY; 14	CHI; 33	IND; 38	POC; 16	GLN; 4	MCH; 23	BRI; 1	ATL; 13	RCH; 5	NHA; 5	DOV; 31	KAN; 12	CAL; 24	CLT; 8	MAR; 4	TAL; 15	TEX; 11*	PHO; 12	HOM; 8	13th	4457
2010	Kyle Busch	18	Toyota	DAY; 14	CAL; 14	LVS; 15	ATL; 25	BRI; 9	MAR; 22	PHO; 8*	TEX; 3	TAL; 9	RCH; 1*	DAR; 7	DOV; 1	CLT; 3	POC; 2	MCH; 20	SON; 39	NHA; 11	DAY; 40	CHI; 17	IND; 8	POC; 23	GLN; 8	MCH; 18	BRI; 1*	ATL; 5	RCH; 2	NHA; 9	DOV; 6	KAN; 21	CAL; 35	CLT; 2*	MAR; 4	TAL; 25	TEX; 32	PHO; 13	HOM; 32	8th	6182
2011	Kyle Busch	18	Toyota	DAY; 8	PHO; 2	LVS; 38	BRI; 1	CAL; 3*	MAR; 3*	TEX; 16	TAL; 35	RCH; 1*	DAR; 11	DOV; 4	CLT; 32	KAN; 12	POC; 3	MCH; 3	SON; 11	DAY; 5	KEN; 1*	NHA; 36	IND; 10	POC; 2	GLN; 3*	MCH; 1	BRI; 14	ATL; 23	RCH; 6	CHI; 22	NHA; 11	DOV; 6	KAN; 11	CLT; 2*	TAL; 33	MAR; 27*		PHO; 36	HOM; 23	12th	2246
2011	Michael McDowell	18	Toyota																																		TEX; 33			12th	2246
2012	Kyle Busch	18	Toyota	DAY; 17	PHO; 6	LVS; 23	BRI; 32	CAL; 2*	MAR; 36	TEX; 11	KAN; 10	RCH; 1	TAL; 2	DAR; 4	CLT; 3	DOV; 29	POC; 30	MCH; 32	SON; 17	KEN; 10*	DAY; 24	NHA; 16	IND; 2	POC; 33	GLN; 7*	MCH; 13	BRI; 6	ATL; 6	RCH; 16	CHI; 4	NHA; 28	DOV; 7*	TAL; 3	CLT; 5	KAN; 31	MAR; 2	TEX; 3	PHO; 3*	HOM; 4*	13th	1133
2013	Kyle Busch	18	Toyota	DAY; 34	PHO; 23	LVS; 4	BRI; 2	CAL; 1*	MAR; 5	TEX; 1*	KAN; 38	RCH; 24	TAL; 37	DAR; 6*	CLT; 38	DOV; 4*	POC; 6	MCH; 4	SON; 35	KEN; 5	DAY; 12	NHA; 2	IND; 10	POC; 8	GLN; 1	MCH; 31	BRI; 11	ATL; 1	RCH; 19	CHI; 2	NHA; 2	DOV; 5	KAN; 34	CLT; 5	TAL; 5	MAR; 15	TEX; 13	PHO; 7	HOM; 7	4th	2364
2014	Kyle Busch	18	Toyota	DAY; 19	PHO; 9	LVS; 11	BRI; 29	CAL; 1	MAR; 14	TEX; 3	DAR; 6	RCH; 3	TAL; 12	KAN; 15	CLT; 9	DOV; 42	POC; 12	MCH; 41	SON; 25	KEN; 2	DAY; 28	NHA; 2	IND; 2	POC; 42	GLN; 40	MCH; 39	BRI; 36	ATL; 16	RCH; 14	CHI; 7	NHA; 8	DOV; 10	KAN; 3	CLT; 5	TAL; 40	MAR; 11	TEX; 4	PHO; 34	HOM; 39	10th	2285
2015	Matt Crafton	18	Toyota	DAY; 18																																				1st	5043
2015	David Ragan	18	Toyota		ATL; 18	LVS; 22	PHO; 21	CAL; 18	MAR; 5	TEX; 13	BRI; 41	RCH; 23	TAL; 38																											1st	5043
2015	Erik Jones	18	Toyota											KAN; 40																										1st	5043
2015	Kyle Busch	18	Toyota												CLT; 11	DOV; 36	POC; 9	MCH; 43	SON; 1	DAY; 17	KEN; 1*	NHA; 1	IND; 1	POC; 21	GLN; 2	MCH; 11	BRI; 8*	DAR; 7	RCH; 2	CHI; 9*	NHA; 37	DOV; 2	CLT; 20	KAN; 5	TAL; 11	MAR; 5	TEX; 4	PHO; 4	HOM; 1	1st	5043
2016	Kyle Busch	18	Toyota	DAY; 3	ATL; 3	LVS; 4	PHO; 4	CAL; 25	MAR; 1*	TEX; 1	BRI; 38	RCH; 2	TAL; 2	KAN; 1	DOV; 30	CLT; 33	POC; 31	MCH; 40	SON; 7	DAY; 2	KEN; 12	NHA; 8*	IND; 1*	POC; 9	GLN; 6	BRI; 39*	MCH; 19	DAR; 11	RCH; 9	CHI; 8	NHA; 3	DOV; 2	CLT; 6	KAN; 5	TAL; 30	MAR; 5	TEX; 5	PHO; 2	HOM; 6	3rd	5035
2017	Kyle Busch	18	Toyota	DAY; 38	ATL; 16	LVS; 22	PHO; 3*	CAL; 8	MAR; 2*	TEX; 15	BRI; 35	RCH; 16	TAL; 3*	KAN; 5	CLT; 2	DOV; 16	POC; 9*	MCH; 7	SON; 5	DAY; 20	KEN; 5	NHA; 12	IND; 34*	POC; 1*	GLN; 7	MCH; 10	BRI; 1	DAR; 2	RCH; 9	CHI; 15	NHA; 1*	DOV; 1	CLT; 29	TAL; 27	KAN; 10*	MAR; 1*	TEX; 19	PHO; 7	HOM; 2	2nd	5035
2018	Kyle Busch	18	Toyota	DAY; 25	ATL; 7	LVS; 2	PHO; 2*	CAL; 3	MAR; 2	TEX; 1*	BRI; 1	RCH; 1	TAL; 13	DOV; 35	KAN; 10	CLT; 1*	POC; 3	MCH; 4	SON; 5	CHI; 1	DAY; 33	KEN; 4	NHA; 2	POC; 1*	GLN; 3	MCH; 3	BRI; 20	DAR; 7	IND; 8	LVS; 7	RCH; 1	ROV; 32	DOV; 8	TAL; 26	KAN; 2	MAR; 4	TEX; 17	PHO; 1*	HOM; 4	4th	5033
2019	Kyle Busch	18	Toyota	DAY; 2	ATL; 6	LVS; 3	PHO; 1*	CAL; 1*	MAR; 3	TEX; 10*	BRI; 1	RCH; 8	TAL; 10	DOV; 10	KAN; 30	CLT; 3	POC; 1*	MCH; 5	SON; 2	CHI; 22	DAY; 14	KEN; 2*	NHA; 8*	POC; 9	GLN; 11	MCH; 6	BRI; 4	DAR; 3*	IND; 37	LVS; 19	RCH; 2*	ROV; 37	DOV; 6	TAL; 19	KAN; 3	MAR; 14	TEX; 7	PHO; 2	HOM; 1*	1st	5040
2020	Kyle Busch	18	Toyota	DAY; 34	LVS; 15	CAL; 2	PHO; 3	DAR; 26	DAR; 2	CLT; 4	CLT; 29	BRI; 4	ATL; 2	MAR; 19	HOM; 6	TAL; 32	POC; 5	POC; 38	IND; 6	KEN; 21	TEX; 4	KAN; 11	NHA; 38	MCH; 5	MCH; 4	DRC; 37	DOV; 3	DOV; 11	DAY; 33	DAR; 7	RCH; 6	BRI; 2	LVS; 6	TAL; 27	ROV; 30	KAN; 5	TEX; 1*	MAR; 9	PHO; 11	8th	2341
2021	Kyle Busch	18	Toyota	DAY; 14	DRC; 35	HOM; 10	LVS; 3	PHO; 25	ATL; 5	BRD; 17	MAR; 10	RCH; 8	TAL; 18	KAN; 1	DAR; 3	DOV; 27	COA; 10	CLT; 3	SON; 5	NSH; 11	POC; 2*	POC; 1	ROA; 3	ATL; 2	NHA; 37	GLN; 4	IRC; 20	MCH; 7	DAY; 34	DAR; 35	RCH; 9	BRI; 21	LVS; 3	TAL; 27	ROV; 4	TEX; 8	KAN; 28	MAR; 2	PHO; 7	9th	2318
2022	Kyle Busch	18	Toyota	DAY; 6	CAL; 14	LVS; 4	PHO; 7	ATL; 33	COA; 28	RCH; 9	MAR; 7	BRD; 1	TAL; 3	DOV; 7*	DAR; 33	KAN; 3	CLT; 2	GTW; 2*	SON; 30	NSH; 21	ROA; 29	ATL; 20	NHA; 12	POC; 36*	IRC; 11	MCH; 36	RCH; 9	GLN; 32	DAY; 10	DAR; 30*	KAN; 26	BRI; 34	TEX; 36	TAL; 20	ROV; 3	LVS; 3	HOM; 9	MAR; 29	PHO; 7	13th	2224

=== Car No. 19 history ===
Carl Edwards (2015–2016)

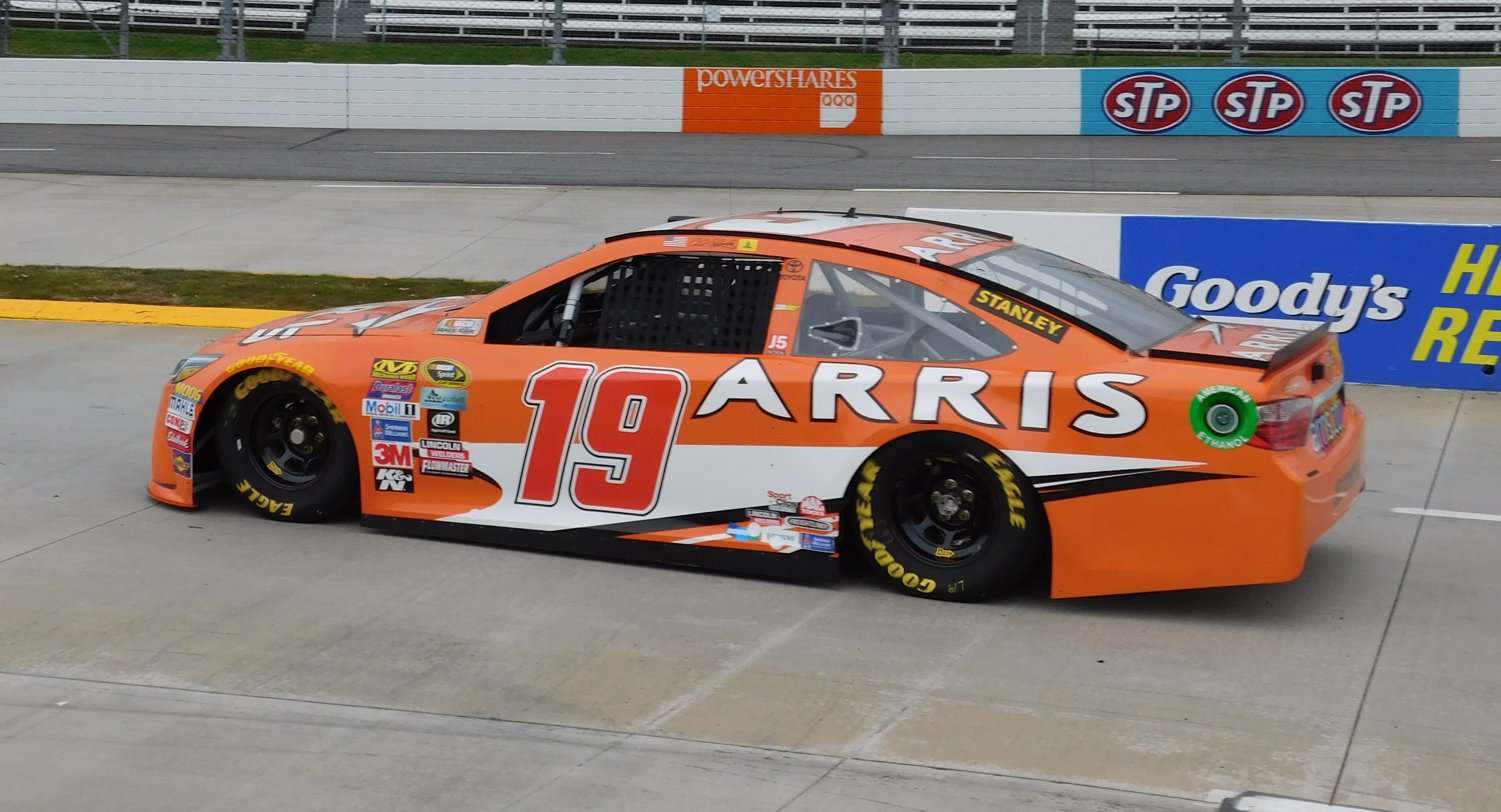
Carl Edwards in the No. 19 at Martinsville Speedway in 2016

JGR announced that they would add a 4th full time car was set to be run as the No. 19 with Carl Edwards driving. New partner Arris signed on to sponsor 17 races, while Stanley Black & Decker moved from Richard Petty Motorsports to sponsor 12 races. Comcast/Xfinity, Sport Clips, and Edwards' longtime sponsor Subway Restaurants also sponsored the car. Darian Grubb made his return to JGR as Edwards' crew chief. Before the Cup series season, Edwards and JGR were informed that because the No. 19 team was not formed until 2015, they were not eligible for one of the 36 charters NASCAR granted to teams who participated full-time in Cup. Joe Gibbs Racing managed to secure Edwards a spot in every race of the 2016 NASCAR Sprint Cup season by purchasing a charter from the defunct Michael Waltrip Racing. Edwards won his first race with JGR at Charlotte in May. Starting third, he led a total of 25 laps, using fuel mileage strategy to take the victory. He also went on to win at Darlington Raceway and finished the season fifth in points. Edwards would go on to win three races in 2016 and would advance to the championship four. Near the end of the race, Joey Logano would make contact causing Edwards to spin and bring out the caution. He would finish fourth in points.

Daniel Suárez (2017–2018)

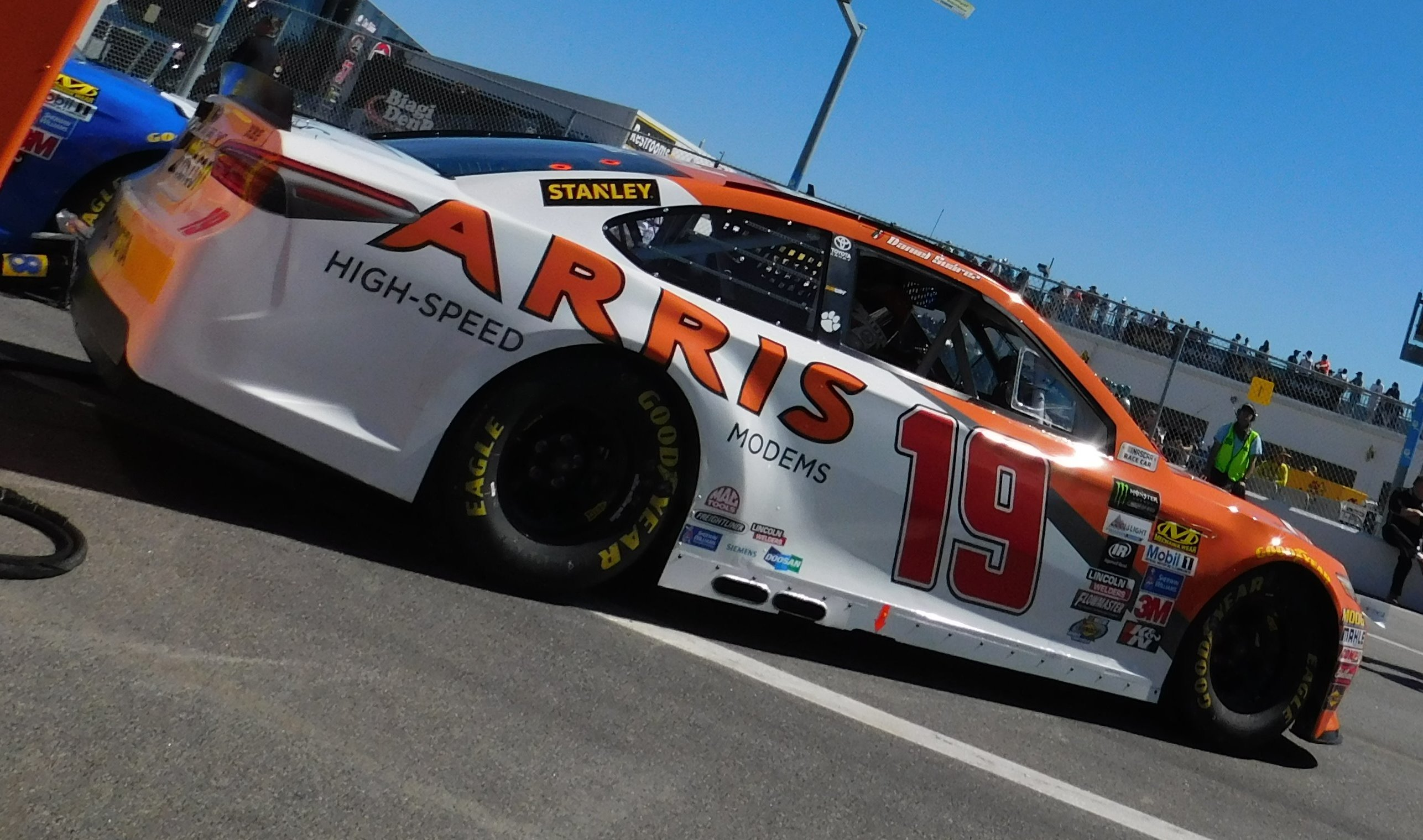
Daniel Suárez's No. 19 prior to the 2017 Daytona 500

On January 11, 2017, Edwards announced that he was stepping away from NASCAR effective immediately, and it was announced that 2016 Xfinity Series champion Daniel Suárez would replace Edwards in the No. 19 car starting at the Daytona 500 in 2017. Suárez finished 20th in points in his rookie season but lost rookie of the year to teammate Erik Jones. Suárez struggled throughout the 2018 season and finished 21st in points.

Martin Truex Jr. (2019–2024)

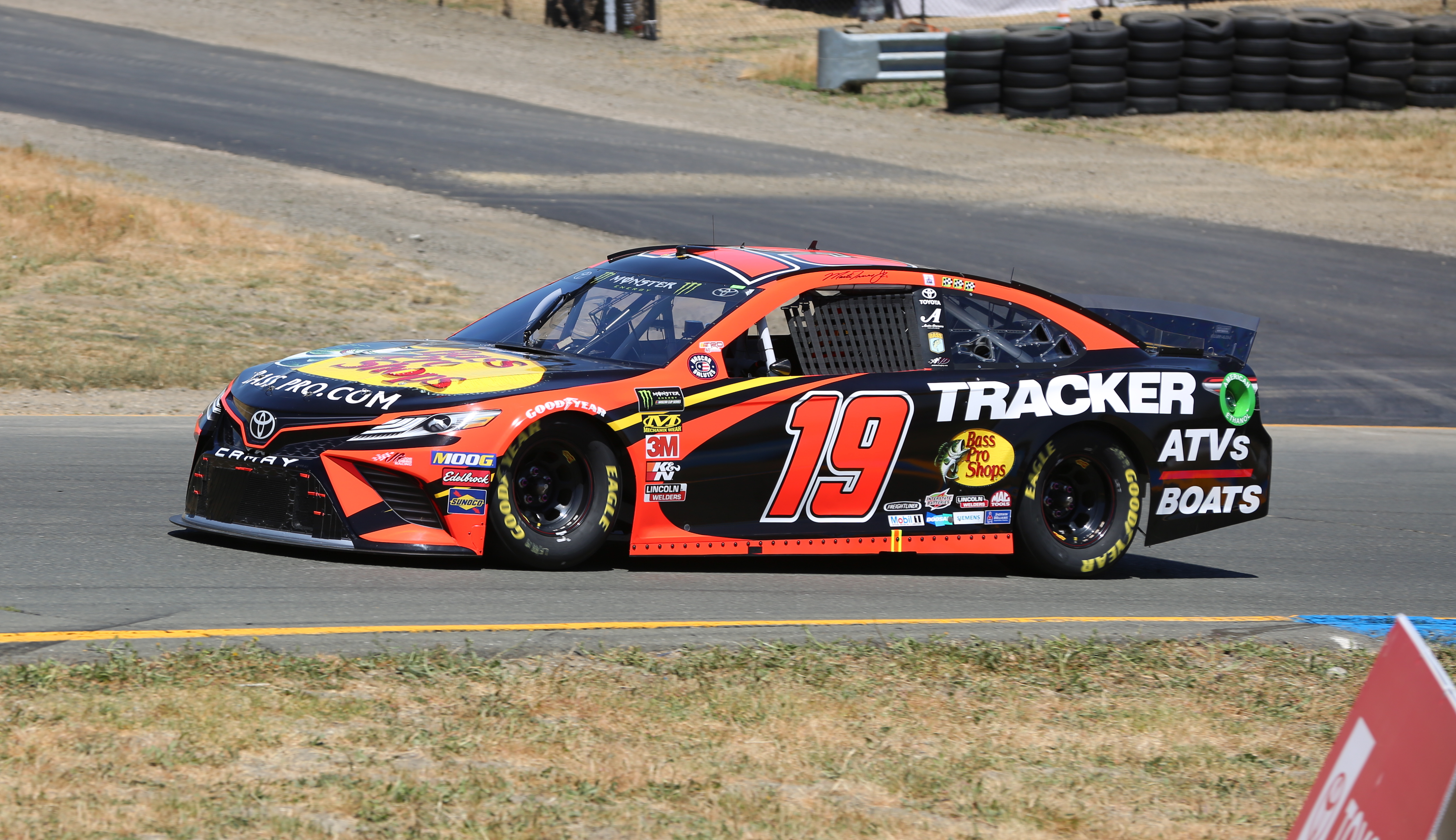
Martin Truex Jr. in the No. 19 at Sonoma Raceway in 2019

On November 7, 2018, it was announced that Martin Truex Jr. will replace Suárez in the No. 19 team. In addition, Truex's crew chief Cole Pearn from the defunct Furniture Row Racing will join the team in the 2019 season. Truex Jr. also brought in long-time sponsors Bass Pro Shops and Auto-Owners Insurance to the No. 19 team.

Unlike his new teammates, Truex's 2019 season started on a low when he was caught in "The Big One" at the Daytona 500, finishing 35th. He made five consecutive top-10 finishes and two top-20 finishes before winning his first short track race at Richmond. Truex also scored wins at Dover, Charlotte, and Sonoma. After the season-ending race at Homestead, Truex finished second to Kyle Busch in the 2019 standings.

On December 9, 2019, Pearn announced he parted ways with JGR to pursue opportunities outside the sport. Truex's 2020 season with new crew chief James Small yielded only one win at Martinsville. During the Playoffs, he was eliminated after the Round of 8 and finished seventh in the 2020 standings.

In the 2021 season, Truex scored three wins during the regular season at Phoenix Martinsville and Darlington. In the playoffs Truex scored his fourth win of the season at Richmond and would advance to the final four but in the season finale truex would finish second in the race and points to Kyle Larson.

Truex started the 2022 season with a 13th-place finish at the 2022 Daytona 500. He was winless through the regular season, but he stayed consistent with three top-fives and 12 top-10 finishes. Consequently, Truex missed the playoffs after Austin Dillon won the August Daytona race. He went winless and finished 17th in the final standings.

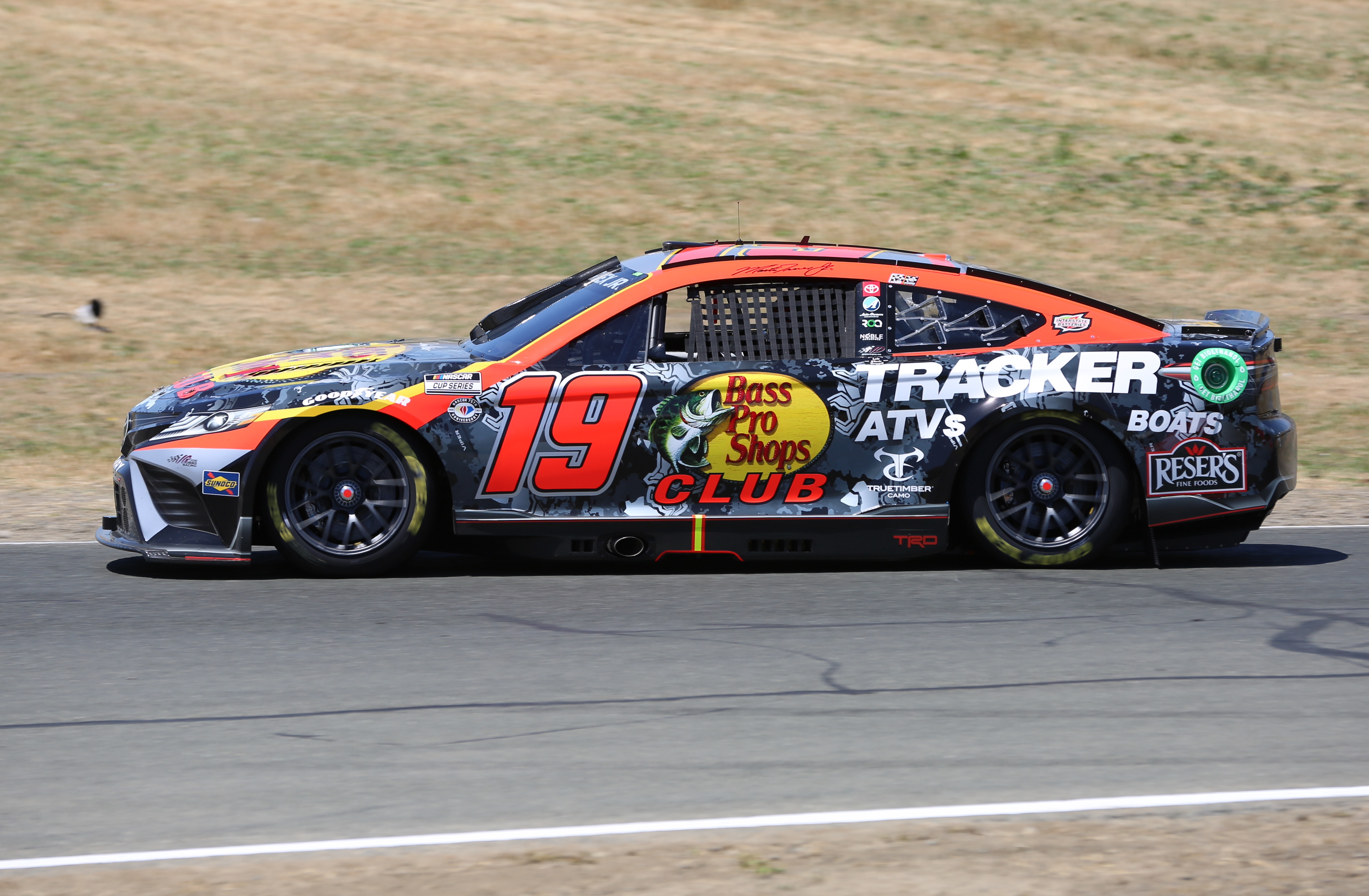
Martin Truex Jr. in the No. 19 at Sonoma Raceway in 2023

Truex began the 2023 season by winning the 2023 Busch Light Clash at The Coliseum. He broke a 54-race winless streak at Dover to make the playoffs. Truex also scored wins at Sonoma and New Hampshire. At the conclusion of the Daytona night race, he clinched the regular season championship. On the second playoff race at Kansas, Truex experienced a puncture on his right rear tire and crashed on the third lap, finishing in last place and dropping him below the cutoff line.

On June 14, 2024, Truex announced his retirement from full-time racing. Despite not winning a race during the regular season, he stayed consistent enough to make the playoffs. Truex was eliminated from the playoffs at the conclusion of the Round of 16.

Chase Briscoe (2025–present)

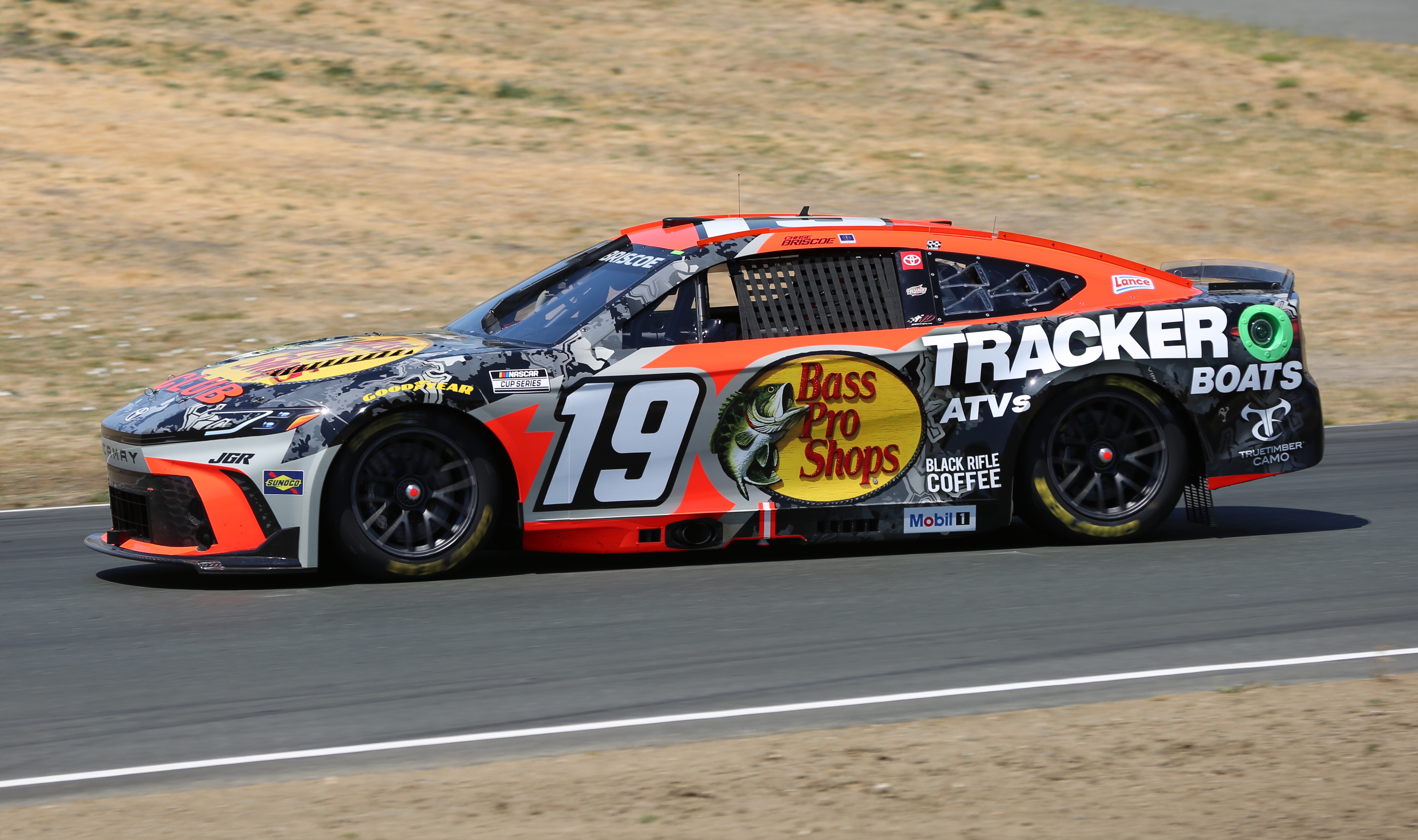
Chase Briscoe in the No. 19 at Sonoma Raceway in 2025

On June 25, 2024, it was officially announced that Chase Briscoe would replace Truex in the No. 19 Toyota in 2025. Briscoe started the 2025 season with a fourth-place finish at the 2025 Daytona 500 after starting on the pole. After the Daytona 500, Briscoe's pole-winning car was taken to the NASCAR Research & Development Center for selected inspection, where it was found to have a modified single-source part, specifically, the spoiler. On February 19, NASCAR released its penalty report, in which Briscoe was penalized 100 driver points and 10 drivers' playoff points. JGR was fined US$100,000, deducted 100 owner points, as well as 10 owners' playoff points. In addition, crew chief James Small was suspended for four races. On March 5, the National Motorsports Appeals Panel overturned the penalty, ruling that the elongation of some of the holes on the No. 19 car's spoiler base were a result of wear and tear and not an illegal modification. On June 22, Briscoe scored his first win with JGR at Pocono. During the playoffs, Briscoe scored wins at Darlington and Talladega to make the Championship 4.

Briscoe started the 2026 season with a 36th place finish at the 2026 Daytona 500. He scored his first win of the season at Chicagoland.

==== Car No. 19 results ====
Year	Driver	No.	Make	1	2	3	4	5	6	7	8	9	10	11	12	13	14	15	16	17	18	19	20	21	22	23	24	25	26	27	28	29	30	31	32	33	34	35	36	Owners	Pts
2015	Carl Edwards	19	Toyota	DAY; 23	ATL; 12	LVS; 42	PHO; 13	CAL; 13	MAR; 17	TEX; 10	BRI; 24	RCH; 19	TAL; 32	KAN; 20	CLT; 1	DOV; 19	POC; 15	MCH; 12	SON; 40	DAY; 41	KEN; 4	NHA; 7	IND; 13	POC; 10	GLN; 8	MCH; 6	BRI; 7	DAR; 1	RCH; 11	CHI; 2	NHA; 5	DOV; 15	CLT; 6	KAN; 8	TAL; 5	MAR; 14	TEX; 5	PHO; 12	HOM; 11	5th	2368
2016	Carl Edwards	19	Toyota	DAY; 5	ATL; 5	LVS; 18	PHO; 2	CAL; 7	MAR; 6	TEX; 7	BRI; 1*	RCH; 1*	TAL; 35	KAN; 11	DOV; 28	CLT; 18	POC; 8	MCH; 6	SON; 4	DAY; 25	KEN; 2	NHA; 20	IND; 35	POC; 8	GLN; 15	BRI; 6	MCH; 7	DAR; 19	RCH; 32	CHI; 15	NHA; 6	DOV; 14	CLT; 12	KAN; 2	TAL; 29	MAR; 36	TEX; 1	PHO; 19	HOM; 34	4th	5007
2017	Daniel Suárez	19	Toyota	DAY; 29	ATL; 21	LVS; 20	PHO; 7	CAL; 7	MAR; 32	TEX; 19	BRI; 18	RCH; 12	TAL; 19	KAN; 7	CLT; 11	DOV; 6	POC; 15	MCH; 24	SON; 16	DAY; 17	KEN; 18	NHA; 6	IND; 7	POC; 7	GLN; 3	MCH; 37	BRI; 15	DAR; 38	RCH; 7	CHI; 12	NHA; 8	DOV; 8	CLT; 6	TAL; 15	KAN; 36	MAR; 15	TEX; 14	PHO; 18	HOM; 34	20th	777
2018	Daniel Suárez	19	Toyota	DAY; 37	ATL; 15	LVS; 26	PHO; 8	CAL; 23	MAR; 18	TEX; 29	BRI; 11	RCH; 10	TAL; 10	DOV; 3	KAN; 28	CLT; 15	POC; 24	MCH; 30	SON; 15	CHI; 11	DAY; 35	KEN; 15	NHA; 22	POC; 2	GLN; 4	MCH; 11	BRI; 18	DAR; 29	IND; 18	LVS; 8	RCH; 17	ROV; 21	DOV; 10	TAL; 16	KAN; 24	MAR; 9	TEX; 28	PHO; 36	HOM; 30	21st	674
2019	Martin Truex Jr.	19	Toyota	DAY; 35	ATL; 2	LVS; 8	PHO; 2	CAL; 8	MAR; 8	TEX; 12	BRI; 17	RCH; 1*	TAL; 20	DOV; 1	KAN; 19	CLT; 1*	POC; 35	MCH; 3	SON; 1*	CHI; 9	DAY; 22	KEN; 19	NHA; 6	POC; 3	GLN; 2	MCH; 4	BRI; 13	DAR; 15	IND; 27	LVS; 1	RCH; 1	ROV; 7	DOV; 2	TAL; 26	KAN; 6	MAR; 1*	TEX; 6	PHO; 6	HOM; 2	2nd	5035
2020	Martin Truex Jr.	19	Toyota	DAY; 32	LVS; 20	CAL; 14	PHO; 32	DAR; 6	DAR; 10	CLT; 6	CLT; 9	BRI; 20	ATL; 3	MAR; 1	HOM; 12	TAL; 24	POC; 6	POC; 10	IND; 38	KEN; 2	TEX; 29	KAN; 4	NHA; 3	MCH; 3	MCH; 3	DRC; 3	DOV; 2	DOV; 2	DAY; 4	DAR; 22*	RCH; 2	BRI; 24	LVS; 4	TAL; 23	ROV; 7	KAN; 9	TEX; 2	MAR; 22	PHO; 10	7th	2341
2021	Martin Truex Jr.	19	Toyota	DAY; 25	DRC; 12	HOM; 3	LVS; 6	PHO; 1	ATL; 9	BRD; 19*	MAR; 1	RCH; 5	TAL; 31	KAN; 6	DAR; 1*	DOV; 19	COA; 35	CLT; 29	SON; 3	NSH; 22	POC; 18	POC; 11	ROA; 9	ATL; 3	NHA; 12	GLN; 3*	IRC; 15	MCH; 10	DAY; 29	DAR; 4	RCH; 1	BRI; 7	LVS; 4	TAL; 12	ROV; 29	TEX; 25	KAN; 7	MAR; 4	PHO; 2	2nd	5035
2022	Martin Truex Jr.	19	Toyota	DAY; 13	CAL; 13	LVS; 8	PHO; 35	ATL; 8	COA; 7	RCH; 4	MAR; 22	BRD; 21	TAL; 5	DOV; 12	DAR; 24	KAN; 6	CLT; 12	GTW; 6	SON; 26	NSH; 22	ROA; 13	ATL; 11	NHA; 4*	POC; 7	IRC; 21	MCH; 6	RCH; 7	GLN; 23	DAY; 8	DAR; 31	KAN; 5	BRI; 36	TEX; 31	TAL; 26	ROV; 17	LVS; 7	HOM; 6	MAR; 20	PHO; 15	17th	1037
2023	Martin Truex Jr.	19	Toyota	DAY; 15	CAL; 11	LVS; 7	PHO; 17	ATL; 19	COA; 17	RCH; 11	BRD; 7	MAR; 3	TAL; 27	DOV; 1	KAN; 8	DAR; 31*	CLT; 3	GTW; 5	SON; 1*	NSH; 2	CSC; 32	ATL; 29	NHA; 1*	POC; 3	RCH; 7	MCH; 2	IRC; 7	GLN; 6	DAY; 24	DAR; 18	KAN; 36	BRI; 19	TEX; 17	TAL; 18	ROV; 20	LVS; 9	HOM; 29	MAR; 12	PHO; 6	11th	2269
2024	Martin Truex Jr.	19	Toyota	DAY; 15	ATL; 12	LVS; 7	PHO; 7	BRI; 2	COA; 10	RCH; 4*	MAR; 18	TEX; 14	TAL; 11	DOV; 3	KAN; 4	DAR; 25	CLT; 12	GTW; 34	SON; 27	IOW; 15	NHA; 9	NSH; 24	CSC; 33	POC; 8	IND; 27	RCH; 36	MCH; 24	DAY; 24	DAR; 36	ATL; 35	GLN; 20	BRI; 24	KAN; 3	TAL; 11	ROV; 21	LVS; 6	HOM; 23	MAR; 24	PHO; 17	10th	2257
2025	Chase Briscoe	19	Toyota	DAY; 4	ATL; 21	COA; 14	PHO; 35	LVS; 17	HOM; 4	MAR; 9	DAR; 28	BRI; 4	TAL; 15	TEX; 27	KAN; 4	CLT; 3	NSH; 17	MCH; 23	MXC; 7	POC; 1*	ATL; 35	CSC; 23	SON; 2	DOV; 2	IND; 18	IOW; 2	GLN; 5	RCH; 13	DAY; 23	DAR; 1*	GTW; 2	BRI; 9	NHA; 10	KAN; 4	ROV; 14	LVS; 4	TAL; 1	MAR; 37	PHO; 18	3rd	5019
2026	Chase Briscoe	19	Toyota	DAY; 36	ATL; 2	COA; 37	PHO; 37	LVS; 8	DAR; 12	MAR; 14	BRI; 5	KAN; 3	TAL; 29	TEX; 23	GLN; 4	CLT; 34	NSH; 3	MCH; 10	POC; 12	COR; 17	SON; 2	CHI; 1	ATL; 36	NWS; 3	IND; 4	IOW; 6	RCH; 2*	NHA; 26	DAY; 13	DAR; 6	GTW; 32	BRI; 27	KAN; 4	LVS; 1*	CLT; 1	PHO; 8	TAL; 33	MAR; 14	HOM; 39	6th	2386
2027	Chase Briscoe	19	Toyota	DAY	ATL	COA	PHO	LVS	DAR	BRI	MAR	TAL	TEX	KAN	DOV	CLT	NSH	POC	MCH	CHI	IOW	SON	ATL	IND	COR	BRI	GTW	DAY	DAR	RCH	GLN	NHA	KAN	LVS	CLT	PHO	TAL	MAR	HOM	-	-

=== Car No. 20 history ===
Tony Stewart (1999–2008)

Tony Stewart in his 2005 championship car at Infineon Raceway

After seven years as a one-car operation, JGR expanded to two cars, bringing in IndyCar champion Tony Stewart. Stewart made his NASCAR Cup debut in the No. 20 Home Depot-sponsored Pontiac Grand Prix at the 1999 Daytona 500, qualifying on the outside pole. He won three races at Richmond, Phoenix, and Homestead, as well as the Winston Open and the NASCAR Rookie of the Year honors and finished fourth in points. 2000 was an up and down year for Stewart as he won six races, including both Dover races, Martinsville, New Hampshire, Michigan, and Homestead but only finished sixth in points. 2001 was another good year for Stewart, as he won the Budweiser Shootout, Richmond, Infineon, and Bristol and finished second in the overall standings.

2002 was a break-out year for Stewart with wins at Atlanta, Richmond, and Watkins Glen along with the Budweiser Shootout and the team won the 2002 points championship. With JGR switching to Chevrolet in 2003, Stewart won twice at Pocono and Charlotte and finished seventh in the points standings. The 2004 season saw Stewart score two wins and finish sixth in points in the first-ever Chase.

Stewart won his second championship in 2005. After winning the Gatorade Duel, the team did not win again until Infineon and then they went on to win the Pepsi 400 at Daytona, followed by New Hampshire, Indianapolis, and Watkins Glen, and held the championship through the Chase.

2006 statistically was Stewart's worst season with JGR. After winning early at Martinsville, he suffered an injury at Charlotte and was replaced during Dover. He won the Pepsi 400 again at Daytona but missed the Chase. During the Chase, Stewart won three races at Kansas, Atlanta, and Texas and finished 11th in points. 2007 was another good year for him and the team. Though Stewart won both the Budweiser Shootout and Gatorade Duel, an early wreck smashed his Daytona 500 hopes. He and the team won three races though at Chicagoland, Indianapolis, and Watkins Glen and finished 6th in points.

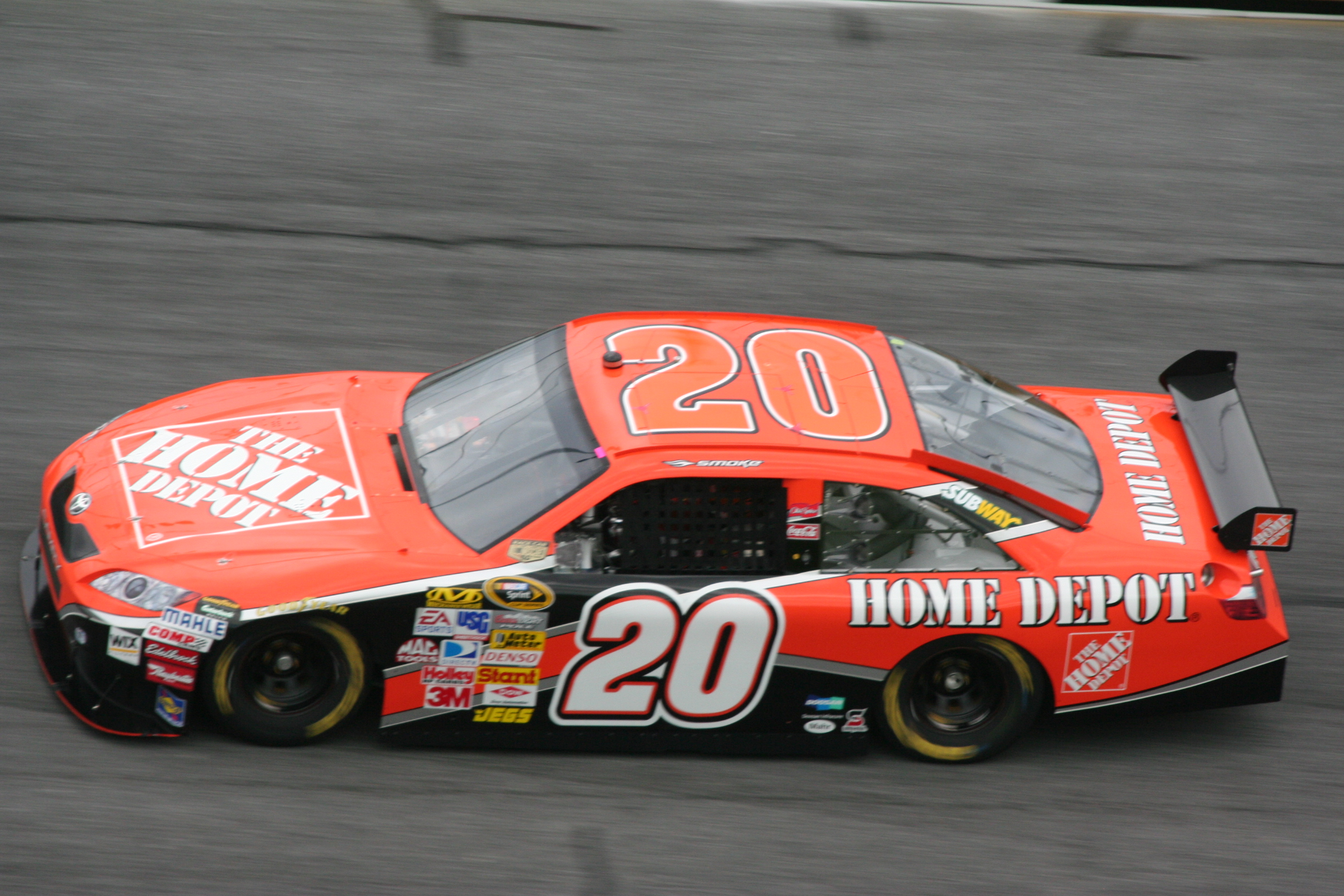
Tony Stewart during his final season with Gibbs at Daytona International Speedway in 2008

Following the team's switch from Chevrolet to Toyota, Stewart's performance dwindled, earning ten top-fives and sixteen top-10s. Stewart's only win for this season was the 2008 AMP Energy 500 at Talladega. On June 9, 2008, Stewart was granted a release from his final year of his contract with Joe Gibbs Racing, ending a twelve-year relationship with the organization that included over 30 wins and two Cup Series Championships. Stewart moved to Haas CNC Racing, renamed Stewart-Haas Racing after he purchased a 50% ownership stake from founder Gene Haas, in part to return to longtime manufacturer Chevrolet.

Joey Logano (2009–2012)

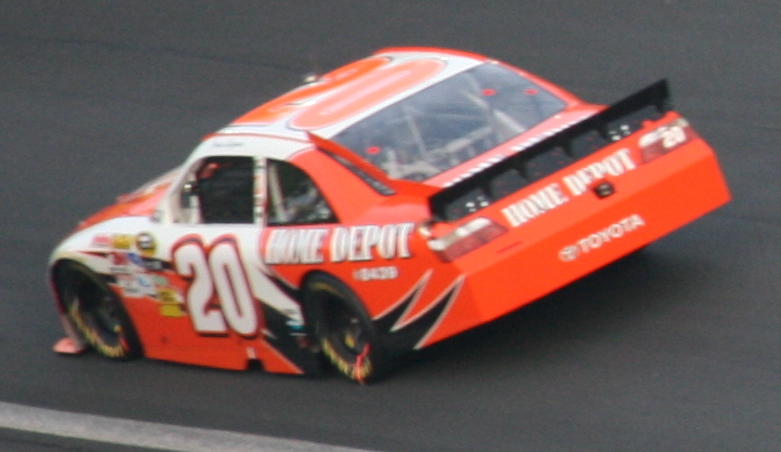
Joey Logano in the No. 20 during the 2010 Coca-Cola 600

On August 25, 2008, Joe Gibbs Racing announced that 18-year-old Joey Logano would replace Stewart as the driver of the No. 20 car for the 2009 season, after only making his NASCAR debut in May 2008 and running abbreviated Nationwide and Cup schedules. Longtime crew chief Greg Zipadelli remained with JGR for Logano's rookie season. Logano's first win came in the rain-shortened Lenox Industrial Tools 301 at New Hampshire Motor Speedway after a fuel mileage gamble, becoming the youngest winner in Cup Series history. Logano beat former open-wheel drivers Max Papis and Scott Speed for the Rookie of the Year Award, with seven top-tens and a 20th-place points finish. Logano failed to win in 2010 and finished 16th in points.

In 2011, Logano again was winless and finished 24th in points. On October 13, 2011, Joe Gibbs Racing announced The Home Depot will become a co-primary sponsor for Logano's car with Dollar General. Dollar General sponsored 12 races while the other 22 continued to be sponsored by The Home Depot. Logano won his second career race at Pocono from the pole in the 2012 Pocono 400 after passing Mark Martin with three laps to go.

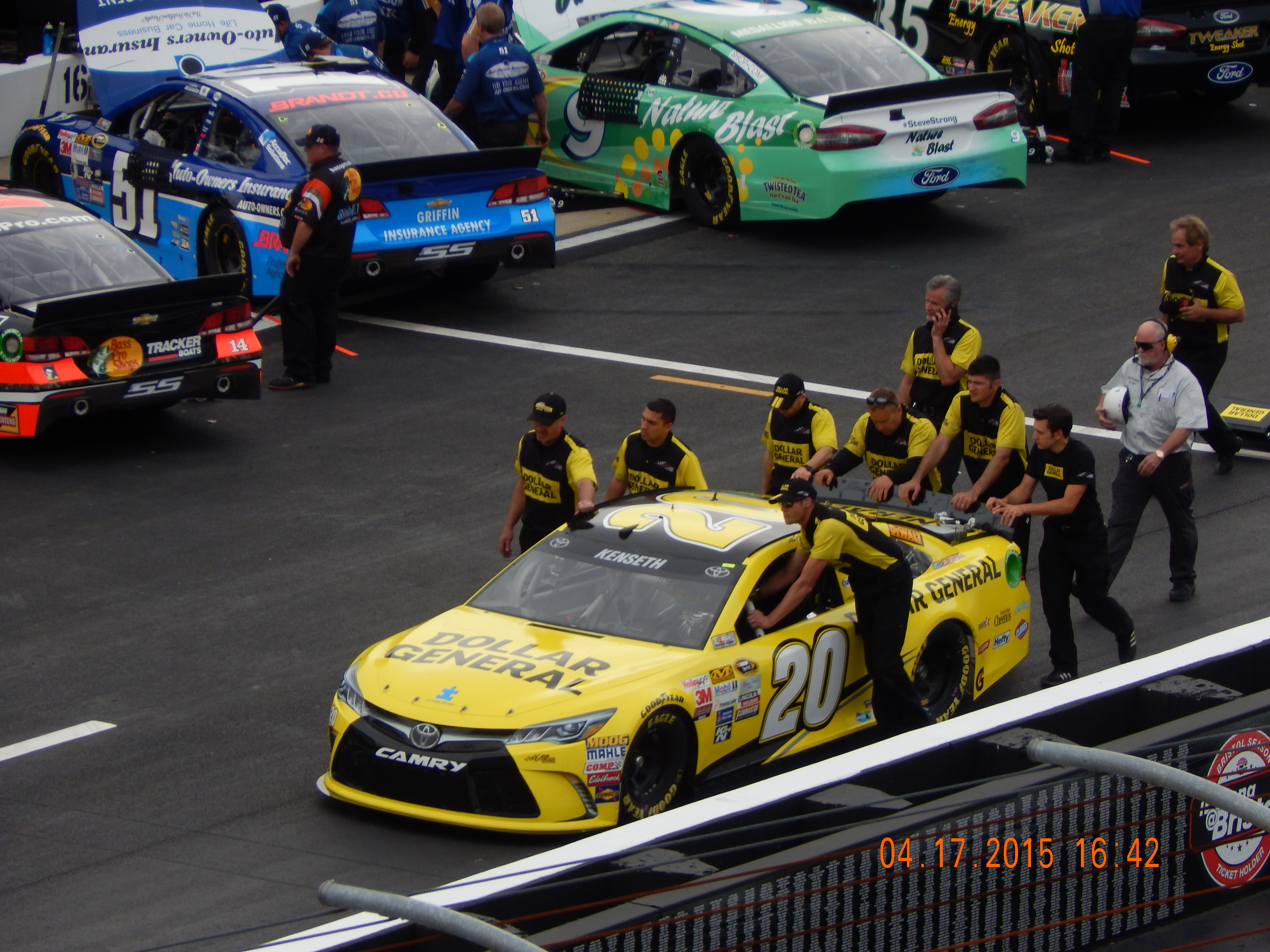
Kenseth's pole and race winning car at Bristol in 2015

Matt Kenseth (2013–2017)

Beginning in 2013, the No. 20 car was taken over by Matt Kenseth, who left Roush Fenway Racing, as Logano moved to the No. 22 at Team Penske. The team had a resurgence, with Kenseth winning five races in the regular season (Las Vegas, Kansas, Darlington, Kentucky, and Bristol), and led the most laps at several other races (Daytona 500, Kansas, Richmond, and Talladega). Kenseth also won the first two races of the Chase at Chicagoland Speedway and New Hampshire Motor Speedway, bringing the team up to seven wins – which was more wins in a single season than the car had ever achieved with Stewart or Logano.

It was announced in September 2014 that Stanley Black & Decker would leave Richard Petty Motorsports to sponsor JGR in the Cup Series for 2015. This move reunited Kenseth with the DeWalt brand for six races as a primary, and the entire season as an associate.

Kenseth won the Food City 500 in Support of Steve Byrnes And Stand Up To Cancer at Bristol in April, his first victory since 2013. On November 3, he was suspended for two races after intentionally wrecking Logano at Martinsville. Erik Jones was named the replacement driver for Kenseth in both of those races, with Jones finishing 12th and 19th in those races.

In 2016 Kenseth won twice at Dover and New Hampshire and finished 5th in points after he was wrecked while leading at Phoenix by Alex Bowman. Dollar General left the team at the end of the season.

On July 11, 2017, JGR announced that Jones would replace Kenseth in the No. 20 car in 2018. Like his JGR teammates, Kenseth was hampered by bad luck and lack of speed at the beginning of the year. He scored his final win with Joe Gibbs Racing at Phoenix in November after passing Chase Elliott late in the race.

Erik Jones (2018–2020)

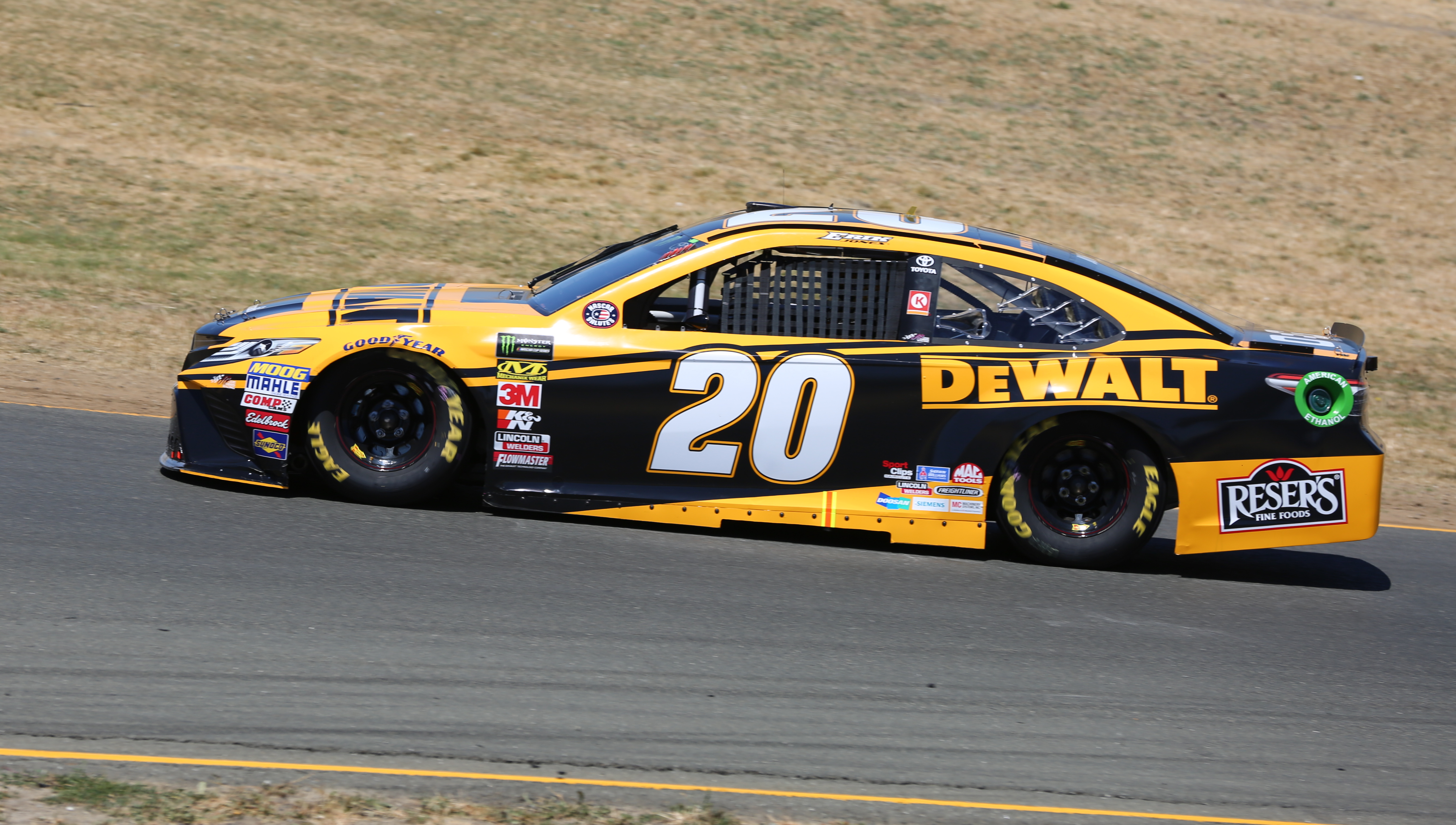
Erik Jones in the No. 20 at Sonoma Raceway in 2018

In 2018, Jones claimed his first career Cup win at the Coke Zero Sugar 400 at Daytona and made it to the Playoffs until he was eliminated after the Bank of America Roval 400 at Charlotte. Jones finished the season 15th in points.

Jones started the 2019 season by finishing third at the Daytona 500, behind teammates Denny Hamlin and Kyle Busch. On September 2, 2019, Jones scored his second career Cup Series win at Darlington, securing him in the 2019 Playoffs. During the playoffs, Jones finished fourth at Richmond, but was disqualified when his car was discovered to have a rear wheel alignment issue during post-race inspection. He once again was eliminated after the Bank of America Roval at Charlotte due to a multi-car incident that punctured his radiator.

Jones kicked off 2020 by winning the Busch Clash; despite being involved in three accidents towards the end of the race, further wrecks among the field led to multiple overtime attempts. On the third overtime, Jones received a push from Hamlin on the final lap to win. On May 18, 2020, following the 2020 The Real Heroes 400 at Darlington, crew chief Chris Gayle was suspended for one race and fined US$20,000 after it was discovered that two lug nuts were not safely secured during post-race inspection. Race engineer Seth Chavka was announced to take over Gayle's duties at the 2020 Toyota 500 at Darlington. Jones missed the Playoffs, went winless, and finished 17th in the final standings.

Christopher Bell (2021–present)

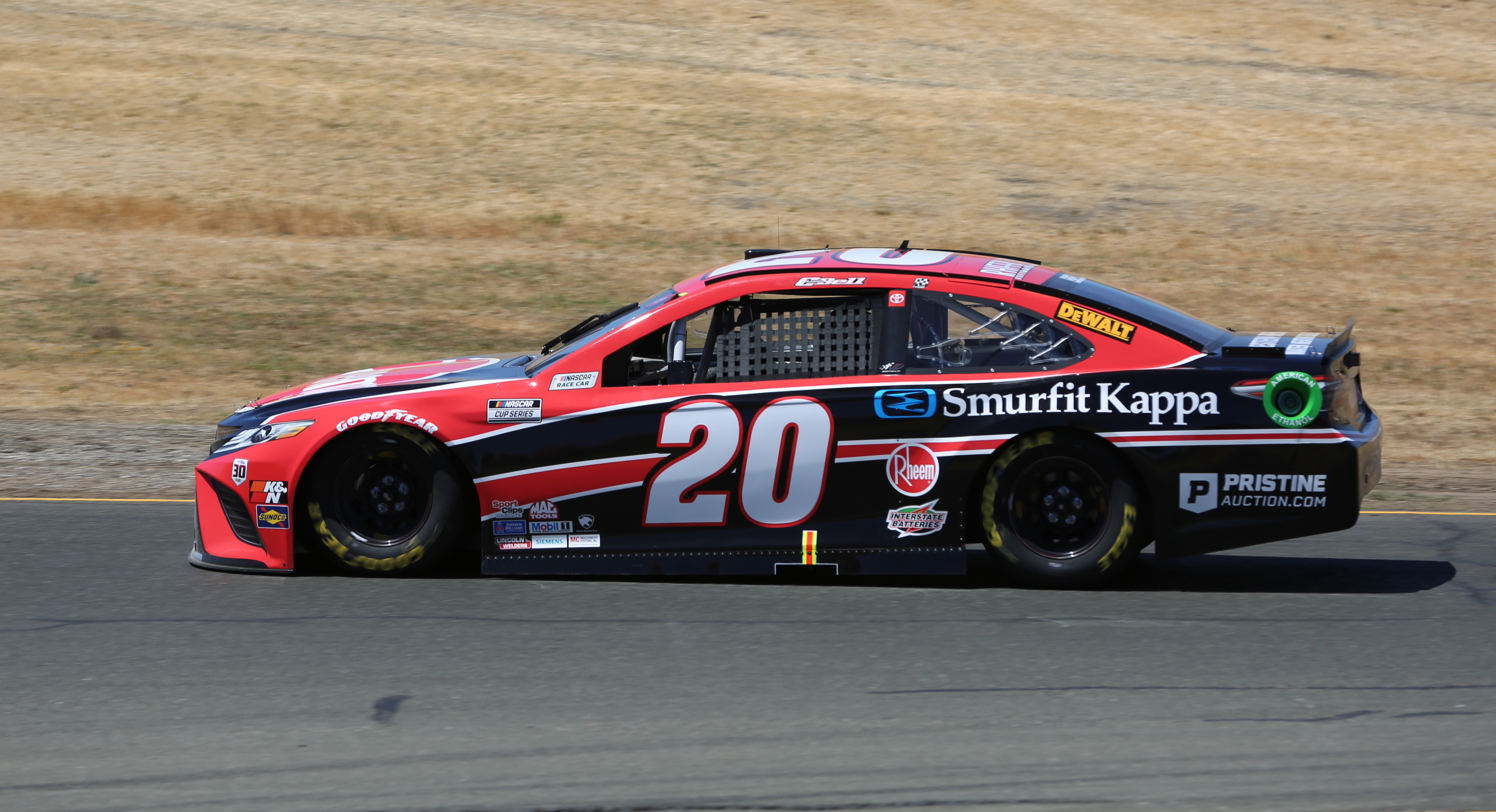
Christopher Bell in the No. 20 at Sonoma Raceway in 2021

On August 6, 2020, it was confirmed that Erik Jones would not be returning to the No. 20 car in 2021. Four days later, Christopher Bell was announced as Jones' replacement. On February 21, 2021, Bell passed Joey Logano with two laps remaining at the Daytona Road Course and scored his first career victory with the team, the first time the No. 20 car returned to victory lane since the 2019 Bojangles' Southern 500 with Jones behind the wheel, 48 races ago. During the playoffs, Bell made it to the Round of 12, but struggled with a poor finish at Las Vegas, yet he rebounded with a fifth-place finish at Talladega. Following the Charlotte Roval race, he was eliminated from the Round of 8.

Bell started the 2022 season with a 34th-place finish at the 2022 Daytona 500. He scored a win at New Hampshire to become the 14th different winner of the season. During the playoffs, Bell won at the Charlotte Roval to advance to the Round of 8. At Las Vegas, Bell got caught between a wreck involving Kyle Larson and Bubba Wallace, resulting in a 34th-place finish. Bell won at Martinsville to make the Championship 4. He finished 10th at the Phoenix finale and a career-best third in the points standings.

Bell began the 2023 season with a third-place finish at the 2023 Daytona 500. He scored his first win of the season at the Bristol dirt race. During the playoffs, Bell won at Homestead to make the Championship 4. At Phoenix, Bell suffered a 36th place DNF and was relegated to a fourth-place finish in the points standings after his right-front brake exploded, sending him to the turn 3 wall.

Bell started the 2024 season with another third-place finish at the 2024 Daytona 500. During the season, he won at Phoenix, Charlotte, and New Hampshire. At Martinsville during the playoffs, Bell ran against the outside wall in a move similar to Ross Chastain's "Hail Melon" to finish 18th, but NASCAR deemed his move a safety violation and penalized him to 22nd place, the last car one lap down. As a result, he was eliminated from the playoffs.

Bell started the 2025 season with a 31st place DNF at the 2025 Daytona 500. He rebounded with three consecutive wins at Atlanta, COTA, and Phoenix. During the playoffs, Bell won at Bristol.

Bell started the 2026 season with a 35th place DNF at the 2026 Daytona 500. At Michigan, he suffered a fractured left wrist after a violent collision with Chase Elliott on turn 4.

==== Car No. 20 results ====
Year	Driver	No.	Make	1	2	3	4	5	6	7	8	9	10	11	12	13	14	15	16	17	18	19	20	21	22	23	24	25	26	27	28	29	30	31	32	33	34	35	36	Owners	Pts
1999	Tony Stewart	20	Pontiac	DAY; 28	CAR; 12	LVS; 36	ATL; 11	DAR; 6	TEX; 6	BRI; 15	MAR; 20	TAL; 5	CAL; 4	RCH; 15	CLT; 4	DOV; 4*	MCH; 9	POC; 6	SON; 15	DAY; 6	NHA; 10*	POC; 4	IND; 7	GLN; 6	MCH; 3	BRI; 5*	DAR; 12	RCH; 1*	NHA; 2	DOV; 2	MAR; 41	CLT; 19	TAL; 6	CAR; 12	PHO; 1*	HOM; 1	ATL; 15			4th	4774
2000	Tony Stewart	20	Pontiac	DAY; 17	CAR; 4	LVS; 2	ATL; 34	DAR; 4	BRI; 42	TEX; 9	MAR; 6	TAL; 34	CAL; 10	RCH; 8	CLT; 14	DOV; 1*	MCH; 1	POC; 6	SON; 10	DAY; 6	NHA; 1*	POC; 26	IND; 5	GLN; 6	MCH; 41	BRI; 2	DAR; 9	RCH; 6	NHA; 23	DOV; 1*	MAR; 1	CLT; 4	TAL; 27	CAR; 7	PHO; 14	HOM; 1*	ATL; 38			6th	4570
2001	Tony Stewart	20	Pontiac	DAY; 36	CAR; 4	LVS; 12	ATL; 27	DAR; 16	BRI; 25	TEX; 23	MAR; 7	TAL; 2	CAL; 4	RCH; 1	CLT; 3	DOV; 7	MCH; 25	POC; 7	SON; 1	DAY; 26	CHI; 33	NHA; 5	POC; 3	IND; 17	GLN; 26	MCH; 27	BRI; 1	DAR; 4	RCH; 7	DOV; 5	KAN; 8	CLT; 2	MAR; 41	TAL; 2	PHO; 5	CAR; 7	HOM; 19*	ATL; 9	NHA; 5	2nd	4763
2002	Tony Stewart	20	Pontiac	DAY; 43	CAR; 4	LVS; 5*	ATL; 1*	DAR; 36	BRI; 15	TEX; 5	MAR; 3*	TAL; 29	CAL; 29	RCH; 1	CLT; 6	DOV; 11	POC; 7	MCH; 16	SON; 2	DAY; 39	CHI; 3	NHA; 39	POC; 7	IND; 12	GLN; 1*	MCH; 2	BRI; 24	DAR; 8	RCH; 30	NHA; 3	DOV; 5	KAN; 8	TAL; 2	CLT; 3	MAR; 11	ATL; 4	CAR; 14	PHO; 8	HOM; 18	1st	4800
2003	Tony Stewart	20	Chevy	DAY; 7	CAR; 20	LVS; 5	ATL; 5	DAR; 10	BRI; 26	TEX; 34	TAL; 25	MAR; 6	CAL; 41*	RCH; 41	CLT; 40	DOV; 4	POC; 1	MCH; 8	SON; 12	DAY; 21	CHI; 2*	NHA; 22	POC; 37	IND; 12*	GLN; 11	MCH; 3	BRI; 23	DAR; 12	RCH; 27	NHA; 20	DOV; 3	TAL; 3	KAN; 4	CLT; 1*	MAR; 3	ATL; 2*	PHO; 18	CAR; 9	HOM; 7	7th	4549
2004	Tony Stewart	20	Chevy	DAY; 2*	CAR; 26	LVS; 3	ATL; 7*	DAR; 17	BRI; 24	TEX; 8	MAR; 14	TAL; 22	CAL; 16	RCH; 4	CLT; 9	DOV; 2*	POC; 27	MCH; 24	SON; 15	DAY; 5	CHI; 1*	NHA; 5	POC; 35	IND; 5	GLN; 1*	MCH; 9	BRI; 19	CAL; 18	RCH; 19	NHA; 39	DOV; 6	TAL; 6	KAN; 14	CLT; 10	MAR; 15	ATL; 9	PHO; 8	DAR; 17	HOM; 4	6th	6326
2005	Tony Stewart	20	Chevy	DAY; 7*	CAL; 17	LVS; 10	ATL; 17	BRI; 3	MAR; 26*	TEX; 31	PHO; 33	TAL; 2	DAR; 10	RCH; 2	CLT; 24	DOV; 15	POC; 29	MCH; 2*	SON; 1*	DAY; 1*	CHI; 5	NHA; 1*	POC; 7	IND; 1*	GLN; 1*	MCH; 5	BRI; 8	CAL; 5	RCH; 7	NHA; 2*	DOV; 18	TAL; 2*	KAN; 4	CLT; 25	MAR; 2*	ATL; 9	TEX; 6	PHO; 4	HOM; 15	1st	6533
2006	Tony Stewart	20	Chevy	DAY; 5	CAL; 43	LVS; 21	ATL; 5	BRI; 12*	MAR; 1*	TEX; 3*	PHO; 2	TAL; 2	RCH; 6	DAR; 12	CLT; 42	DOV; 25	POC; 3	MCH; 41	SON; 28	DAY; 1*	CHI; 32	NHA; 37	POC; 7	IND; 8	GLN; 2	MCH; 3	BRI; 22	CAL; 9	RCH; 18	NHA; 2	DOV; 33	KAN; 1	TAL; 22	CLT; 13	MAR; 4	ATL; 1*	TEX; 1*	PHO; 14	HOM; 15	11th	4727
2007	Tony Stewart	20	Chevy	DAY; 43	CAL; 8	LVS; 7	ATL; 2	BRI; 35*	MAR; 7	TEX; 25	PHO; 2*	TAL; 28	RCH; 8	DAR; 6	CLT; 6	DOV; 40	POC; 5	MCH; 3	SON; 6	NHA; 12	DAY; 38	CHI; 1*	IND; 1*	POC; 6	GLN; 1	MCH; 10	BRI; 4	CAL; 13	RCH; 2	NHA; 3	DOV; 9	KAN; 39	TAL; 8	CLT; 7	MAR; 13	ATL; 30	TEX; 11	PHO; 4	HOM; 30	6th	6242
2008	Tony Stewart	20	Toyota	DAY; 3	CAL; 7	LVS; 43	ATL; 2	BRI; 14*	MAR; 5	TEX; 7	PHO; 14	TAL; 38*	RCH; 4	DAR; 21	CLT; 18	DOV; 41	POC; 35	MCH; 5	SON; 10	NHA; 13*	DAY; 20	CHI; 5	IND; 23	POC; 2	GLN; 2	MCH; 12	BRI; 8	CAL; 22	RCH; 2	NHA; 8	DOV; 11	KAN; 40	TAL; 1*	CLT; 11	MAR; 26	ATL; 17	TEX; 16	PHO; 22	HOM; 9	9th	6202
2009	Joey Logano	20	Toyota	DAY; 43	CAL; 26	LVS; 13	ATL; 30	BRI; 38	MAR; 32	TEX; 30	PHO; 21	TAL; 9	RCH; 19	DAR; 9	CLT; 9	DOV; 15	POC; 23	MCH; 25	SON; 19	NHA; 1	DAY; 19	CHI; 18	IND; 12	POC; 27	GLN; 16	MCH; 7	BRI; 34	ATL; 22	RCH; 14	NHA; 21	DOV; 42	KAN; 28	CAL; 14	CLT; 5	MAR; 12	TAL; 3	TEX; 19	PHO; 21	HOM; 24	20th	3791
2010	Joey Logano	20	Toyota	DAY; 20	CAL; 5	LVS; 6	ATL; 35	BRI; 27	MAR; 2	PHO; 10	TEX; 28	TAL; 36	RCH; 16	DAR; 27	DOV; 10	CLT; 13	POC; 13	MCH; 10	SON; 33	NHA; 9	DAY; 29	CHI; 19	IND; 9	POC; 25	GLN; 33	MCH; 10	BRI; 18	ATL; 27	RCH; 4	NHA; 35	DOV; 3	KAN; 17	CAL; 11	CLT; 7	MAR; 6	TAL; 5	TEX; 4	PHO; 3	HOM; 39	16th	4185
2011	Joey Logano	20	Toyota	DAY; 23	PHO; 33	LVS; 23	BRI; 23	CAL; 25	MAR; 13	TEX; 24	TAL; 10	RCH; 11	DAR; 35	DOV; 27	CLT; 3	KAN; 23	POC; 11	MCH; 18	SON; 6	DAY; 3	KEN; 14	NHA; 4	IND; 25	POC; 26	GLN; 5	MCH; 21	BRI; 13	ATL; 24	RCH; 35	CHI; 16	NHA; 14	DOV; 29	KAN; 29	CLT; 12	TAL; 24	MAR; 18	TEX; 37	PHO; 11	HOM; 19	24th	902
2012	Joey Logano	20	Toyota	DAY; 9	PHO; 10	LVS; 16	BRI; 16	CAL; 24	MAR; 23	TEX; 19	KAN; 15	RCH; 24	TAL; 26	DAR; 10	CLT; 23	DOV; 8	POC; 1*	MCH; 35	SON; 10	KEN; 22	DAY; 4	NHA; 14	IND; 33	POC; 13	GLN; 32	MCH; 31	BRI; 8	ATL; 18	RCH; 30	CHI; 7	NHA; 8	DOV; 10	TAL; 32	CLT; 9	KAN; 19	MAR; 16	TEX; 11	PHO; 27	HOM; 14	17th	965
2013	Matt Kenseth	20	Toyota	DAY; 37*	PHO; 7	LVS; 1	BRI; 35	CAL; 7	MAR; 14	TEX; 12	KAN; 1*	RCH; 7*	TAL; 8*	DAR; 1	CLT; 15	DOV; 40	POC; 25	MCH; 6	SON; 19	KEN; 1	DAY; 33	NHA; 9	IND; 5	POC; 22	GLN; 23	MCH; 15	BRI; 1*	ATL; 12	RCH; 6	CHI; 1*	NHA; 1*	DOV; 7	KAN; 11	CLT; 3	TAL; 20	MAR; 2*	TEX; 4	PHO; 23	HOM; 2	2nd	2400
2014	Matt Kenseth	20	Toyota	DAY; 6	PHO; 12	LVS; 10	BRI; 13*	CAL; 4	MAR; 6	TEX; 7	DAR; 4	RCH; 5	TAL; 37	KAN; 10	CLT; 3	DOV; 3	POC; 25	MCH; 14	SON; 42	KEN; 4	DAY; 20	NHA; 4	IND; 4	POC; 38	GLN; 9	MCH; 38	BRI; 3	ATL; 2	RCH; 41	CHI; 10	NHA; 21	DOV; 5	KAN; 13	CLT; 19	TAL; 2	MAR; 6	TEX; 25	PHO; 3	HOM; 6	7th	2334
2015	Matt Kenseth	20	Toyota	DAY; 35	ATL; 5	LVS; 9	PHO; 16	CAL; 31	MAR; 4	TEX; 23	BRI; 1	RCH; 7	TAL; 25	KAN; 6	CLT; 4	DOV; 39	POC; 6	MCH; 4	SON; 21	DAY; 23	KEN; 5	NHA; 7	IND; 7	POC; 1	GLN; 4	MCH; 1*	BRI; 42	DAR; 21	RCH; 1*	CHI; 5	NHA; 1	DOV; 7	CLT; 42	KAN; 14*	TAL; 26	MAR; 38			HOM; 7	15th	2234
2015	Erik Jones	20	Toyota																																		TEX; 12	PHO; 19		15th	2234
2016	Matt Kenseth	20	Toyota	DAY; 14	ATL; 19	LVS; 37	PHO; 7	CAL; 19	MAR; 15	TEX; 11	BRI; 36	RCH; 7	TAL; 23	KAN; 4	DOV; 1	CLT; 7	POC; 7	MCH; 14	SON; 20	DAY; 28	KEN; 8	NHA; 1	IND; 2	POC; 17	GLN; 10	BRI; 37	MCH; 13	DAR; 6	RCH; 38	CHI; 9	NHA; 2	DOV; 5	CLT; 2	KAN; 9*	TAL; 28	MAR; 4*	TEX; 7	PHO; 21	HOM; 7	5th	2330
2017	Matt Kenseth	20	Toyota	DAY; 40	ATL; 3	LVS; 9	PHO; 37	CAL; 36	MAR; 9	TEX; 16	BRI; 4	RCH; 23*	TAL; 24	KAN; 12	CLT; 4	DOV; 12	POC; 10	MCH; 11	SON; 20	DAY; 27	KEN; 17	NHA; 4	IND; 5	POC; 9	GLN; 2	MCH; 24	BRI; 4	DAR; 6	RCH; 38	CHI; 9	NHA; 3	DOV; 11	CLT; 11	TAL; 14	KAN; 37	MAR; 9	TEX; 4	PHO; 1	HOM; 8	7th	2344
2018	Erik Jones	20	Toyota	DAY; 36	ATL; 11	LVS; 8	PHO; 9	CAL; 7	MAR; 17	TEX; 4	BRI; 26	RCH; 13	TAL; 39	DOV; 18	KAN; 7	CLT; 19	POC; 29	MCH; 15	SON; 7	CHI; 6	DAY; 1	KEN; 7	NHA; 16	POC; 5	GLN; 5	MCH; 13	BRI; 5	DAR; 8	IND; 2	LVS; 40	RCH; 11	ROV; 30	DOV; 4	TAL; 8	KAN; 4	MAR; 26	TEX; 4	PHO; 17	HOM; 30	15th	2820
2019	Erik Jones	20	Toyota	DAY; 3	ATL; 7	LVS; 13	PHO; 29	CAL; 19	MAR; 30	TEX; 4	BRI; 24	RCH; 14	TAL; 19	DOV; 6	KAN; 3	CLT; 40	POC; 3	MCH; 31	SON; 8	CHI; 7	DAY; 23	KEN; 3	NHA; 3	POC; 2	GLN; 4	MCH; 18	BRI; 22	DAR; 1	IND; 39	LVS; 36	RCH; 38	ROV; 40	DOV; 15	TAL; 34	KAN; 7	MAR; 20	TEX; 10	PHO; 7	HOM; 3	16th	2194
2020	Erik Jones	20	Toyota	DAY; 18	LVS; 23	CAL; 10	PHO; 28	DAR; 8	DAR; 5	CLT; 11	CLT; 26	BRI; 5	ATL; 28	MAR; 20	HOM; 21	TAL; 5	POC; 38	POC; 3	IND; 33	KEN; 22	TEX; 6	KAN; 5	NHA; 24	MCH; 11	MCH; 27	DRC; 11	DOV; 12	DOV; 22	DAY; 35	DAR; 4	RCH; 22	BRI; 3	LVS; 8	TAL; 2	ROV; 3	KAN; 20	TEX; 21	MAR; 12	PHO; 22	17th	873
2021	Christopher Bell	20	Toyota	DAY; 16	DRC; 1	HOM; 20	LVS; 7	PHO; 9	ATL; 21	BRD; 34	MAR; 7	RCH; 4	TAL; 17	KAN; 28	DAR; 14	DOV; 21	COA; 38	CLT; 24	SON; 24	NSH; 9	POC; 17	POC; 32	ROA; 2	ATL; 8	NHA; 2	GLN; 7	IRC; 36	MCH; 13	DAY; 32	DAR; 20	RCH; 3	BRI; 29	LVS; 24	TAL; 5	ROV; 8	TEX; 3	KAN; 8	MAR; 17	PHO; 9	12th	2279
2022	Christopher Bell	20	Toyota	DAY; 34	CAL; 36	LVS; 10	PHO; 26	ATL; 23	COA; 3	RCH; 6	MAR; 20	BRD; 7	TAL; 22	DOV; 4	DAR; 6	KAN; 5	CLT; 5	GTW; 9	SON; 27	NSH; 8	ROA; 18	ATL; 19	NHA; 1	POC; 4	IRC; 12	MCH; 26	RCH; 2	GLN; 8	DAY; 36	DAR; 5	KAN; 3	BRI; 4	TEX; 34	TAL; 17	ROV; 1	LVS; 34	HOM; 11	MAR; 1	PHO; 10	4th	5027
2023	Christopher Bell	20	Toyota	DAY; 3	CAL; 32	LVS; 5	PHO; 6	ATL; 3	COA; 31	RCH; 4	BRD; 1*	MAR; 16	TAL; 8	DOV; 6	KAN; 36	DAR; 14	CLT; 24	GTW; 11	SON; 9	NSH; 7	CSC; 18*	ATL; 23	NHA; 29	POC; 6	RCH; 20	MCH; 13	IRC; 9	GLN; 3	DAY; 16	DAR; 23	KAN; 8	BRI; 3*	TEX; 4	TAL; 14	ROV; 15	LVS; 2	HOM; 1	MAR; 7	PHO; 36	4th	5001
2024	Christopher Bell	20	Toyota	DAY; 3	ATL; 34	LVS; 33	PHO; 1	BRI; 10	COA; 2	RCH; 6	MAR; 35	TEX; 17	TAL; 38	DOV; 34	KAN; 6	DAR; 13	CLT; 1*	GTW; 7*	SON; 9	IOW; 4	NHA; 1*	NSH; 36*	CSC; 37	POC; 12	IND; 4	RCH; 6	MCH; 35	DAY; 3	DAR; 3	ATL; 4	GLN; 14	BRI; 5	KAN; 7*	TAL; 6	ROV; 2	LVS; 2*	HOM; 4	MAR; 22	PHO; 5*	5th	2412
2025	Christopher Bell	20	Toyota	DAY; 31	ATL; 1	COA; 1	PHO; 1*	LVS; 12	HOM; 29	MAR; 2	DAR; 3	BRI; 8	TAL; 35	TEX; 9	KAN; 2	CLT; 8	NSH; 10	MCH; 16	MXC; 2	POC; 17	ATL; 30	CSC; 24	SON; 5	DOV; 18	IND; 8	IOW; 17	GLN; 2	RCH; 21	DAY; 13	DAR; 29	GTW; 7	BRI; 1	NHA; 6	KAN; 3	ROV; 3	LVS; 3	TAL; 8	MAR; 7	PHO; 11	5th	2402
2026	Christopher Bell	20	Toyota	DAY; 35	ATL; 21	COA; 3	PHO; 2*	LVS; 4	DAR; 19	MAR; 7	BRI; 27	KAN; 20	TAL; 17*	TEX; 38	GLN; 21	CLT; 2	NSH; 2	MCH; 31	POC; 26	COR; 39	SON; 5	CHI; 2	ATL; 2	NWS; 19	IND; 2	IOW; 2	RCH; 7	NHA; 4	DAY; 17	DAR; 1	GTW; 19	BRI; 4	KAN; 6	LVS; 23	CLT; 2	PHO; 4*	TAL; 35	MAR; 10	HOM; 4	2nd	2452
2027	Christopher Bell	20	Toyota	DAY	ATL	COA	PHO	LVS	DAR	BRI	MAR	TAL	TEX	KAN	DOV	CLT	NSH	POC	MCH	CHI	IOW	SON	ATL	IND	COR	BRI	GTW	DAY	DAR	RCH	GLN	NHA	KAN	LVS	CLT	PHO	TAL	MAR	HOM	-	-

=== Car No. 54 history ===
Ty Gibbs (2023–present)

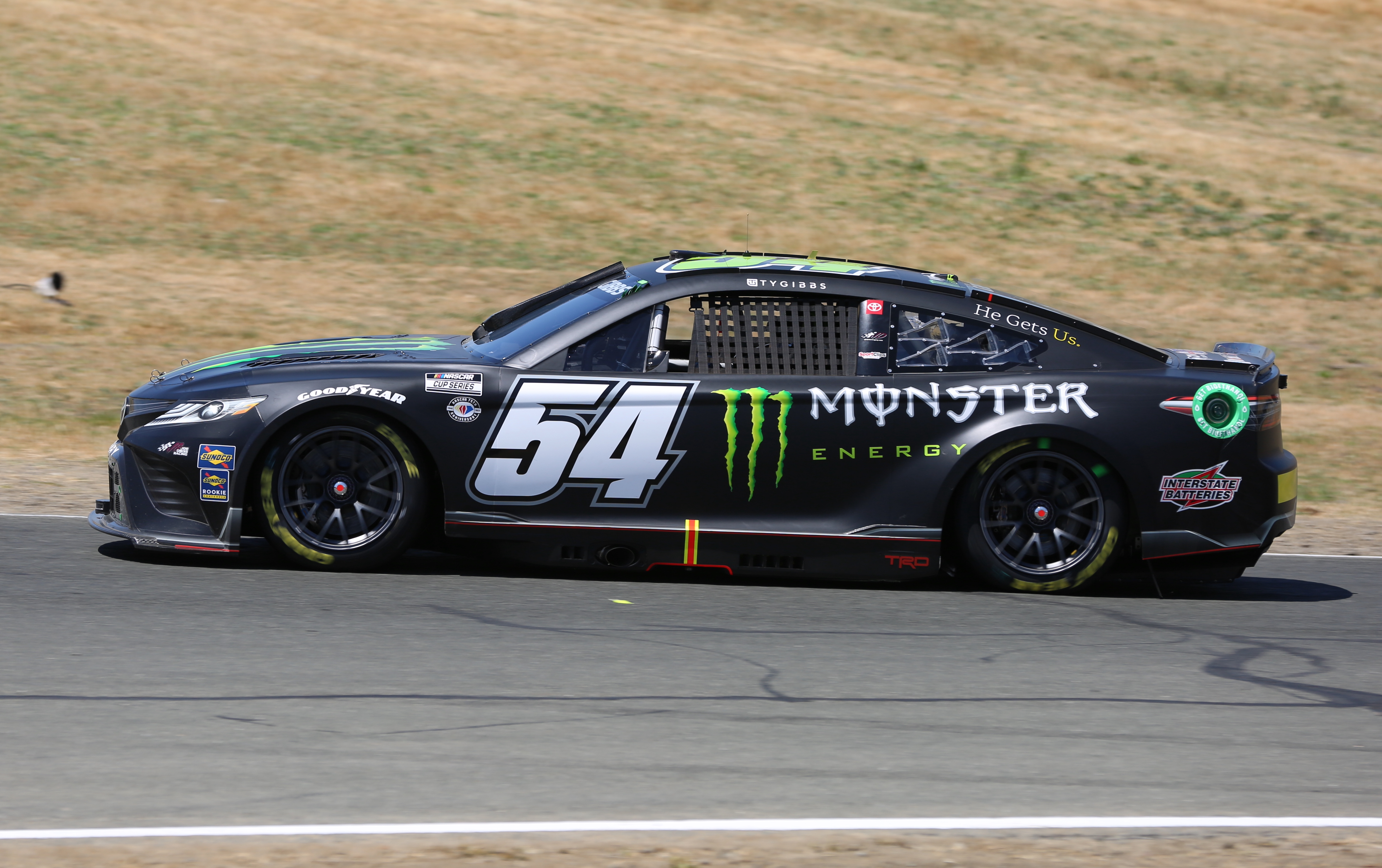
Ty Gibbs in the No. 54 at Auto Club Speedway in 2023

After JGR and Toyota failed to secure a replacement for Mars, it was reported that Busch would depart from the team and manufacturer after 15 seasons. On September 13, 2022, Busch announced that he had signed with Richard Childress Racing to drive the No. 8 in 2023, returning to Chevrolet for the first time since 2007, and brought Kyle Busch Motorsports with him. The No. 18 was then renumbered to the No. 54 in 2023, with Ty Gibbs as the driver, and its new primary sponsors being Monster Energy and He Gets Us.

Gibbs began the 2023 season with a 25th place finish at the 2023 Daytona 500. With three top-five and 10 top-10 finishes, he finished 18th in the points standings and won Rookie of the Year honors.

Gibbs started the 2024 season with a 17th place finish at the 2024 Daytona 500. Despite not winning a race during the regular season, he stayed consistent enough to make the playoffs. Gibbs was eliminated from the playoffs at the conclusion of the Round of 16.

==== Car No. 54 results ====
Year	Driver	No.	Make	1	2	3	4	5	6	7	8	9	10	11	12	13	14	15	16	17	18	19	20	21	22	23	24	25	26	27	28	29	30	31	32	33	34	35	36	Owners	Pts
2023	Ty Gibbs	54	Toyota	DAY; 25	CAL; 16	LVS; 22	PHO; 28	ATL; 9	COA; 9	RCH; 9	BRD; 10	MAR; 18	TAL; 31	DOV; 13	KAN; 34	DAR; 16	CLT; 26	GTW; 20	SON; 18	NSH; 14	CSC; 9	ATL; 34	NHA; 27	POC; 5	RCH; 15	MCH; 11	IRC; 12	GLN; 5	DAY; 35	DAR; 21	KAN; 14	BRI; 5	TEX; 33	TAL; 34	ROV; 4	LVS; 34	HOM; 7	MAR; 18	PHO; 21	18th	771
2024	Ty Gibbs	54	Toyota	DAY; 17	ATL; 10	LVS; 5	PHO; 3	BRI; 9	COA; 3	RCH; 16	MAR; 19	TEX; 13	TAL; 22	DOV; 10	KAN; 32	DAR; 2	CLT; 6	GTW; 11	SON; 37	IOW; 25	NHA; 16	NSH; 23	CSC; 3*	POC; 27	IND; 23	RCH; 22	MCH; 3	DAY; 5	DAR; 20	ATL; 18	GLN; 22	BRI; 15	KAN; 5	TAL; 13	ROV; 35	LVS; 30	HOM; 36	MAR; 32	PHO; 40	15th	2169
2025	Ty Gibbs	54	Toyota	DAY; 16	ATL; 32	COA; 34	PHO; 25	LVS; 22	HOM; 25	MAR; 13	DAR; 9	BRI; 3	TAL; 17*	TEX; 23	KAN; 28	CLT; 24	NSH; 31	MCH; 3	MXC; 11	POC; 14	ATL; 14	CSC; 2	SON; 7	DOV; 5	IND; 21	IOW; 21	GLN; 33	RCH; 18	DAY; 8	DAR; 22	GTW; 10	BRI; 10*	NHA; 35	KAN; 25	ROV; 12	LVS; 34	TAL; 3	MAR; 12	PHO; 21	19th	783
2026	Ty Gibbs	54	Toyota	DAY; 23	ATL; 37	COA; 4	PHO; 4	LVS; 5	DAR; 6	MAR; 4	BRI; 1	KAN; 9	TAL; 34	TEX; 36	GLN; 3	CLT; 6	NSH; 13	MCH; 25	POC; 9	COR; 15	SON; 3	CHI; 8	ATL; 4	NWS; 4	IND; 12	IOW; 1	RCH; 15	NHA; 6	DAY; 34	DAR; 2	GTW; 18	BRI; 5	KAN; 17	LVS; 17	CLT; 34	PHO; 10	TAL; 17	MAR; 3	HOM; 11	9th	2335
2027	Ty Gibbs	54	Toyota	DAY	ATL	COA	PHO	LVS	DAR	BRI	MAR	TAL	TEX	KAN	DOV	CLT	NSH	POC	MCH	CHI	IOW	SON	ATL	IND	COR	BRI	GTW	DAY	DAR	RCH	GLN	NHA	KAN	LVS	CLT	PHO	TAL	MAR	HOM	-	-

== Additional cars ==
=== No. 80 (2003–2005, 2007) ===
Before expanding to four full-time cars, JGR had occasionally fielded a fourth car for R&D or driver development purposes. Mike Bliss drove several races for JGR in 2003 & 2004 in a No. 80 car. In 2007, development driver Aric Almirola made his NEXTEL Cup debut in the No. 80 at Las Vegas with Joe Gibbs Driven sponsoring. Almirola started 31st and finished 40th after a crash. He was scheduled to drive at the All-Star Race and Coca-Cola 600, but he suffered a practice crash and the car was withdrawn from both races. He would leave the team later in the season for Ginn Racing and Dale Earnhardt, Inc.

==== Car No. 80 results ====
Year	Driver	No.	Make	1	2	3	4	5	6	7	8	9	10	11	12	13	14	15	16	17	18	19	20	21	22	23	24	25	26	27	28	29	30	31	32	33	34	35	36	Owners	Pts
2003	Mike Bliss	80	Chevy	DAY	CAR	LVS	ATL	DAR	BRI	TEX	TAL	MAR	CAL	RCH	CLT	DOV	POC	MCH	SON	DAY; 26	CHI	NHA	POC	IND	GLN	MCH	BRI	DAR	RCH	NHA	DOV	TAL; DNQ	KAN	CLT	MAR	ATL	PHO	CAR	HOM	61st	107
2004	Mike Bliss	80	Chevy	DAY	CAR	LVS	ATL	DAR	BRI	TEX	MAR	TAL	CAL	RCH	CLT	DOV	POC	MCH	SON	DAY	CHI; 31	NHA	POC	IND	GLN	MCH	BRI	CAL	RCH; 4	NHA	DOV	TAL	KAN	CLT	MAR	ATL	PHO	DAR	HOM	58th	230
2005	J. J. Yeley	80	Chevy	DAY	CAL	LVS	ATL	BRI	MAR	TEX	PHO	TAL	DAR	RCH	CLT	DOV	POC	MCH	SON	DAY	CHI	NHA	POC	IND	GLN	MCH	BRI	CAL	RCH	NHA	DOV	TAL	KAN	CLT	MAR	ATL; DNQ	TEX	PHO	HOM	71st	31
2007	Aric Almirola	80	Chevy	DAY	CAL	LVS; 41	ATL	BRI	MAR	TEX	PHO	TAL	RCH	DAR	CLT	DOV	POC	MCH	SON	NHA	DAY	CHI	IND	POC	GLN	MCH	BRI	CAL	RCH	NHA	DOV	KAN	TAL	CLT	MAR	ATL	TEX	PHO	HOM	60th	40

=== As No. 02 (2008–2009) ===
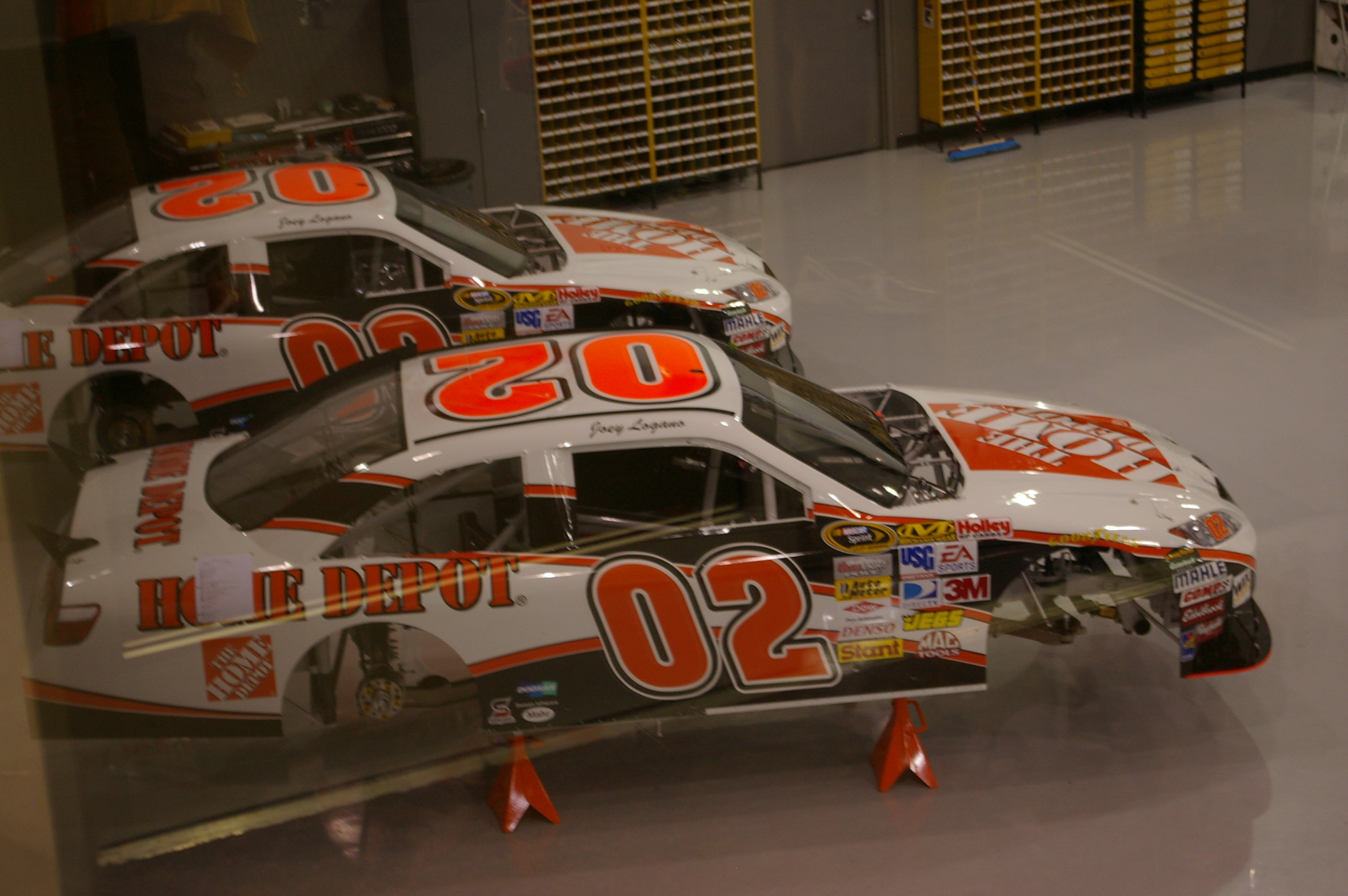
Joey Logano's No. 02 cars in 2008

In 2008, 18-year-old Joey Logano was scheduled to run several late-season races in preparation for running the full 2009 season. Logano drove the No. 02 (reverse of the 20), with an inverted Home Depot scheme of teammate Tony Stewart's. He was scheduled to make his Sprint Cup debut at Richmond International Raceway, but qualifying was rained out by Hurricane Hanna. The 02 attempted again at Loudon and at Atlanta, but qualifying was rained out in both races as well, leading Logano to make his debut in JGR-affiliated Hall of Fame Racing's No. 96 at Loudon and miss the Atlanta race. Logano made the race in his fourth attempt with Gibbs at Texas, starting 43rd and last and finishing 40th, several laps down.

In 2009 Farm Bureau Insurance, who had been banned from the Nationwide Series due to the Viceroy Rule, moved up to sponsor 6 Sprint Cup Series races for JGR, including 3 for the 02 car at Charlotte, Texas, and Homestead. David Gilliland was tabbed to drive the car in the three events, with a best finish of 25th at Charlotte. After the 2009 season, Farm Bureau Insurance announced they would not return for the 2010 season.

==== Car No. 02 results ====
Year	Driver	No.	Make	1	2	3	4	5	6	7	8	9	10	11	12	13	14	15	16	17	18	19	20	21	22	23	24	25	26	27	28	29	30	31	32	33	34	35	36	Owners	Pts
2008	Joey Logano	02	Toyota	DAY	CAL	LVS	ATL	BRI	MAR	TEX	PHO	TAL	RCH	DAR	CLT	DOV	POC	MCH	SON	NHA	DAY	CHI	IND	POC	GLN	MCH	BRI	CAL	RCH; DNQ	NHA	DOV	KAN	TAL	CLT	MAR	ATL; DNQ	TEX; 40	PHO	HOM	56th	53
2009	David Gilliland	02	Toyota	DAY	CAL	LVS	ATL	BRI	MAR	TEX	PHO	TAL	RCH	DAR	CLT	DOV	POC	MCH	SON	NHA	DAY	CHI	IND	POC	GLN	MCH	BRI	ATL	RCH	NHA	DOV	KAN	CAL	CLT; 25	MAR	TAL	TEX; 28	PHO	HOM; 29	52nd	243

=== As No. 81 (2013) ===
In 2013, Elliott Sadler was signed to drive the renumbered No. 81 (reverse of 18) for three races, with his former sponsor at Robert Yates Racing, Mars, Inc., promoting their new Alert Energy Caffeine Gum on the car. Sadler was scheduled to run at Kansas Speedway, Talladega Superspeedway and a third unannounced race. The deal was made in part to avoid conflict on the 18 car with Kyle Busch's sponsor Monster Energy. For Sadler, it was his first start in the Sprint Cup Series since the 2012 Daytona 500, and his first opportunity since he was forced to turn down a part-time deal at Michael Waltrip Racing that same year (ultimately taken by 2013 teammate Brian Vickers) by then-owner Richard Childress. At Kansas, he got out of the racing groove and wrecked in turn 3 on lap 85, relegating him to a 40th-place finish. He failed to qualify at Talladega after rain washed out qualifying and was set by owner points as the No. 81 was too low in points. After Alert Energy was pulled from the market, Doublemint sponsored the car at Talladega.

==== Car No. 81 results ====
Year	Driver	No.	Make	1	2	3	4	5	6	7	8	9	10	11	12	13	14	15	16	17	18	19	20	21	22	23	24	25	26	27	28	29	30	31	32	33	34	35	36	Owners	Pts
2013	Elliott Sadler	81	Toyota	DAY	PHO	LVS	BRI	CAL	MAR	TEX	KAN; 40	RCH	TAL; DNQ	DAR	CLT	DOV	POC	MCH	SON	KEN	DAY	NHA	IND	POC	GLN	MCH	BRI	ATL	RCH	CHI	NHA	DOV	KAN	CLT	TAL	MAR	TEX	PHO	HOM	49th	4
