= Grant Enfinger =

American racing driver (born 1985)

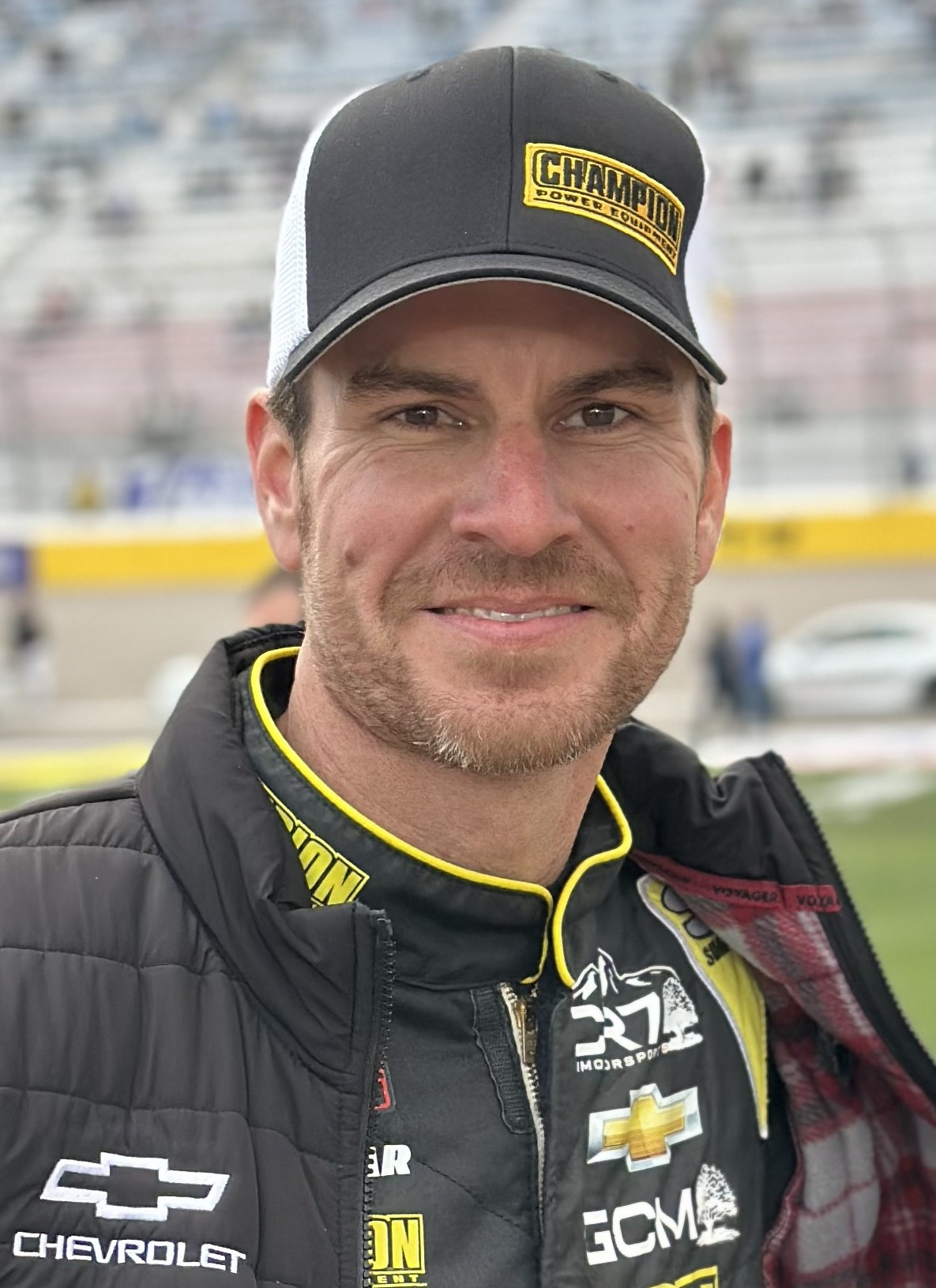
- Enfinger at Las Vegas Motor Speedway in 2025
- Born: Grant McArthur Enfinger; January 22, 1985 (age 41); Fairhope, Alabama, U.S.
- Achievements: 2015 ARCA Racing Series Champion; 2019 NASCAR Gander Outdoors Truck Series Regular Season Champion; 2008, 2011 Rattler 250 Winner

NASCAR Cup Series career
- 1 race run over 1 year
- 2023 position: 56th
- Best finish: 56th (2023)
- First race: 2023 Toyota/Save Mart 350 (Sonoma)
Wins	Top tens	Poles
0	0	0

NASCAR O'Reilly Auto Parts Series career
- 1 race run over 1 year
- 2021 position: 104th
- Best finish: 104th (2021)
- First race: 2021 Alsco Uniforms 300 (Charlotte)
Wins	Top tens	Poles
0	0	0

NASCAR FedEx Freight Truck Series career
- 246 races run over 14 years
- Truck no., team: No. 9 (CR7 Motorsports)
- 2026 position: 9th
- Best finish: 2nd (2023)
- First race: 2010 Mountain Dew 250 (Talladega)
- Last race: 2026 Craftsman 200 (Homestead)
- First win: 2016 Fred's 250 (Talladega)
- Last win: 2026 LiUNA! 150 (Lime Rock)
Wins	Top tens	Poles
13	137	6

ARCA Menards Series career
- 100 races run over 15 years
- Best finish: 1st (2015)
- First race: 2008 Prairie Meadows 250 (Iowa)
- Last race: 2025 General Tire 150 (Charlotte)
- First win: 2013 ARCA Mobile 200 (Mobile)
- Last win: 2017 Herr's Potato Chips 100 (Springfield)
Wins	Top tens	Poles
16	71	6

ARCA Menards Series East career
- 2 races run over 2 years
- Best finish: 19th (2020)
- First race: 2020 Pensacola 200 (Pensacola)
- Last race: 2023 Sprecher 150 (Milwaukee)
Wins	Top tens	Poles
0	2	1

ARCA Menards Series West career
- 1 race run over 1 year
- Best finish: 39th (2024)
- First race: 2024 General Tire 150 (Phoenix)
Wins	Top tens	Poles
0	1	0
- Statistics up to date as of November 6, 2026.

Grant McArthur Enfinger (born January 22, 1985) is an American professional stock car racing driver. He competes full-time in the NASCAR Truck Series, driving the No. 9 Chevrolet Silverado RST for CR7 Motorsports. Before moving up to the Truck Series, Enfinger won the 2015 ARCA Racing Series series championship with GMS Racing.

== Racing career ==
=== ARCA Menards Series ===
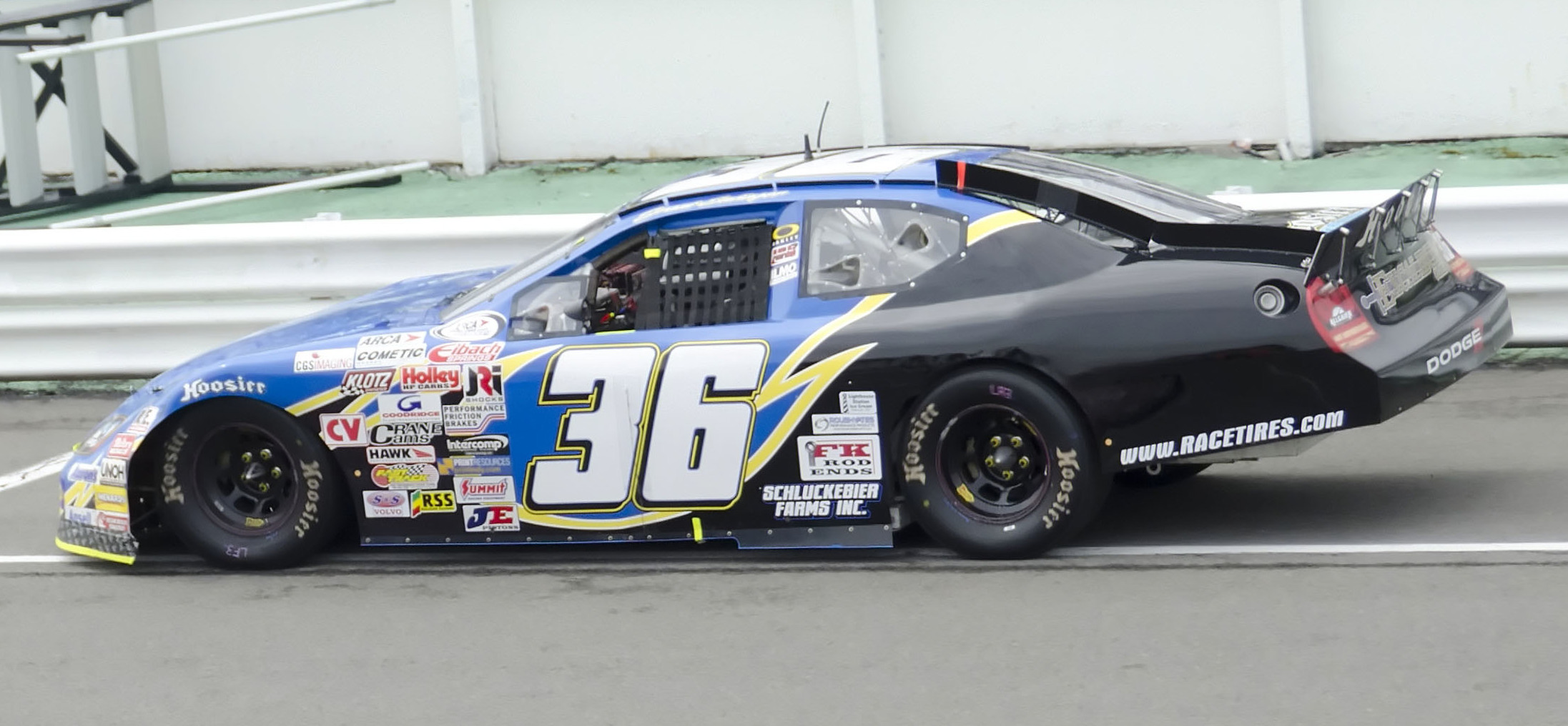
Enfinger in the No. 36 ARCA car for Allgaier Motorsports at Pocono in 2011

After previously competing on short tracks in the southeastern United States as well as in the 2007 Snowball Derby, a race in which he posted the fastest lap, Enfinger began competing in the then-ARCA Re/Max Series in 2008, competing in four races during that season and continued racing in the series on a limited basis during the next two seasons. His best finish, second, occurred twice in 2009 at Chicagoland Speedway and Kentucky Speedway. During this period, he primarily drove for a family-owned team, which merged with RAB Racing in 2010.

Moving to Allgaier Motorsports for 2011, Enfinger competed in his first full season in ARCA, winning one pole at Berlin Raceway and finishing fourth in series standings at the conclusion of the 2011 season.

Enfinger would race a limited schedule in 2012, running events for Allgaier Motorsports, BRG Motorsports and Team BCR Racing. In what would be a breakout season, he would make 9 starts for Team BCR in 2013, collecting his first ARCA Racing Series win at his home track of Mobile Speedway and following that with a win at Iowa later in the season.

2014 would start off in record fashion, with Enfinger winning the first three races of the season (Daytona, Mobile, and Salem). He would follow that up with a win at Elko for his fourth win of the season. Prior to the race at Lucas Oil Raceway in July, it was announced that Enfinger, who was second in points at the time, would be moving from the Team BCR Ford to GMS Racing, taking his No. 90 and sponsor Motor Honey with him. Allegiant Travel will provide additional sponsorship. Enfinger finished fourth in his first race for GMS at IRP, but crashed at Pocono with Frank Kimmel. The next race at Berlin Raceway, Enfinger dominated, leading 181 of 200 laps to win the Federated Auto Parts 200 and move within 25 points of the points leader Mason Mitchell. He would move within 20 points of the lead after winning at DuQuoin State Fairgrounds Racetrack, earning him the Bill France Four Crown Award. In spite of his six wins, Enfinger would finish second in points to Mitchell after an engine failure and a crash in the final two races respectively.

Enfinger won the season-opening race at Daytona again in 2015. After winning five additional races, he won his first ARCA championship at the end of the season.

=== NASCAR ===
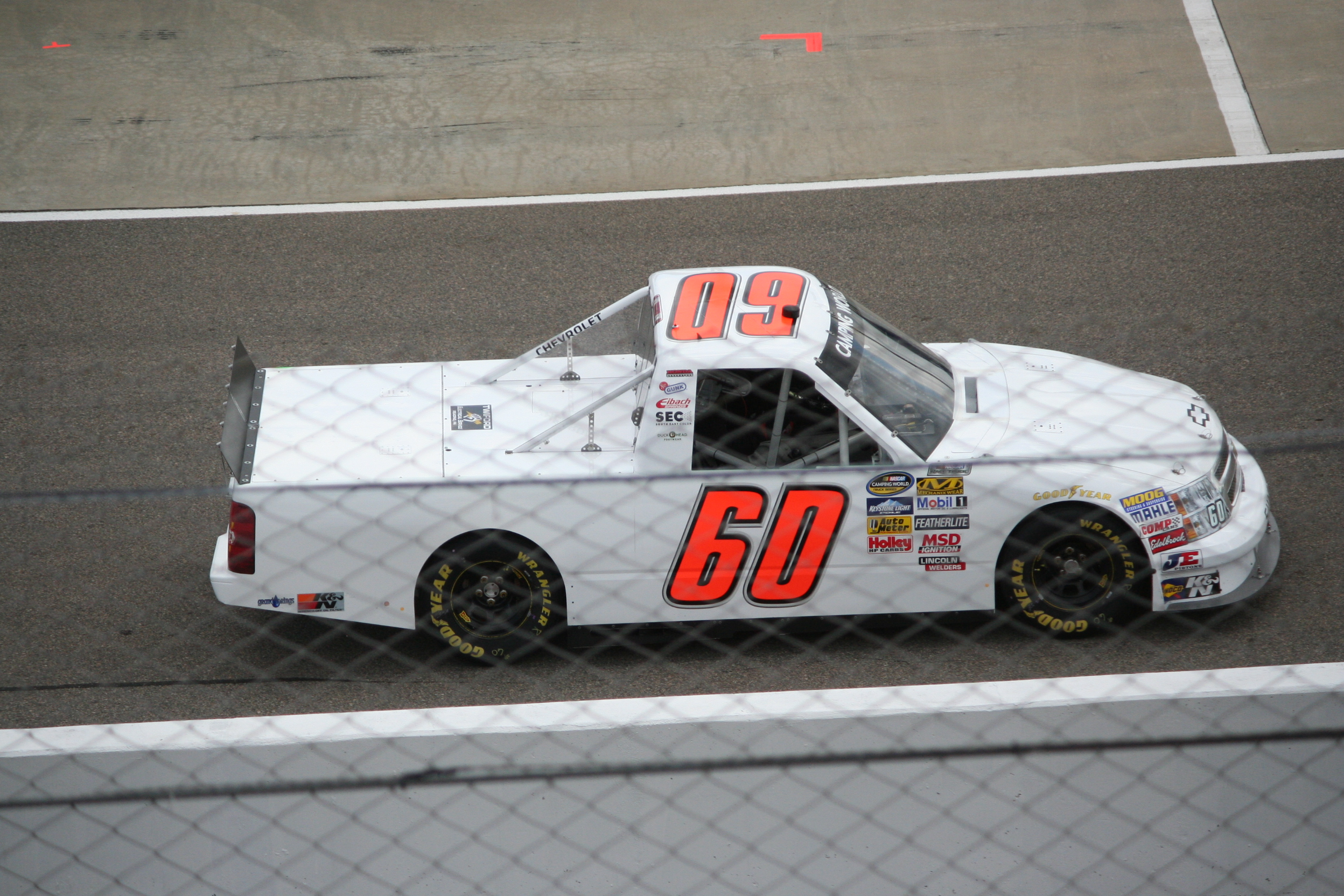
Enfinger in the No. 60 truck for Turn One Racing at Rockingham in 2012

In 2010, Enfinger made his first career start in the NASCAR Camping World Truck Series, finishing 22nd. Enfinger attempted to compete in the NASCAR Camping World Truck Series season-opening event at Daytona International Speedway, but failed to qualify for the event. In October, he ran in the truck races at Talladega Superspeedway and Martinsville Speedway.

In October 2011, it was announced that Enfinger would be moving up to the top level of American stock car racing competition, the Sprint Cup Series, with Sinica Motorsports, a start-up team founded by Argentine businessman George Sinica. The team intended to run a limited schedule of ten to fifteen races in the Cup series during the 2012 season. Enfinger attempted his first race for the team at the 2011 Sprint Cup Series finale at Homestead–Miami Speedway, where he failed to qualify for the event.

In December 2011, Enfinger was released from his contract by Sinica Motorsports. Neither he nor the Sinica-owned team attempted any Sprint Cup starts in 2012. Instead, Enfinger ran in the Camping World Truck Series in 2012 for Bragg Racing Group at Daytona International Speedway, and also competed at Rockingham Speedway in the No. 60 for Turn One Racing. He returned to the series in August at Bristol with Allgaier Motorsports. He raced at Las Vegas for Brad Keselowski Racing in the No. 29.

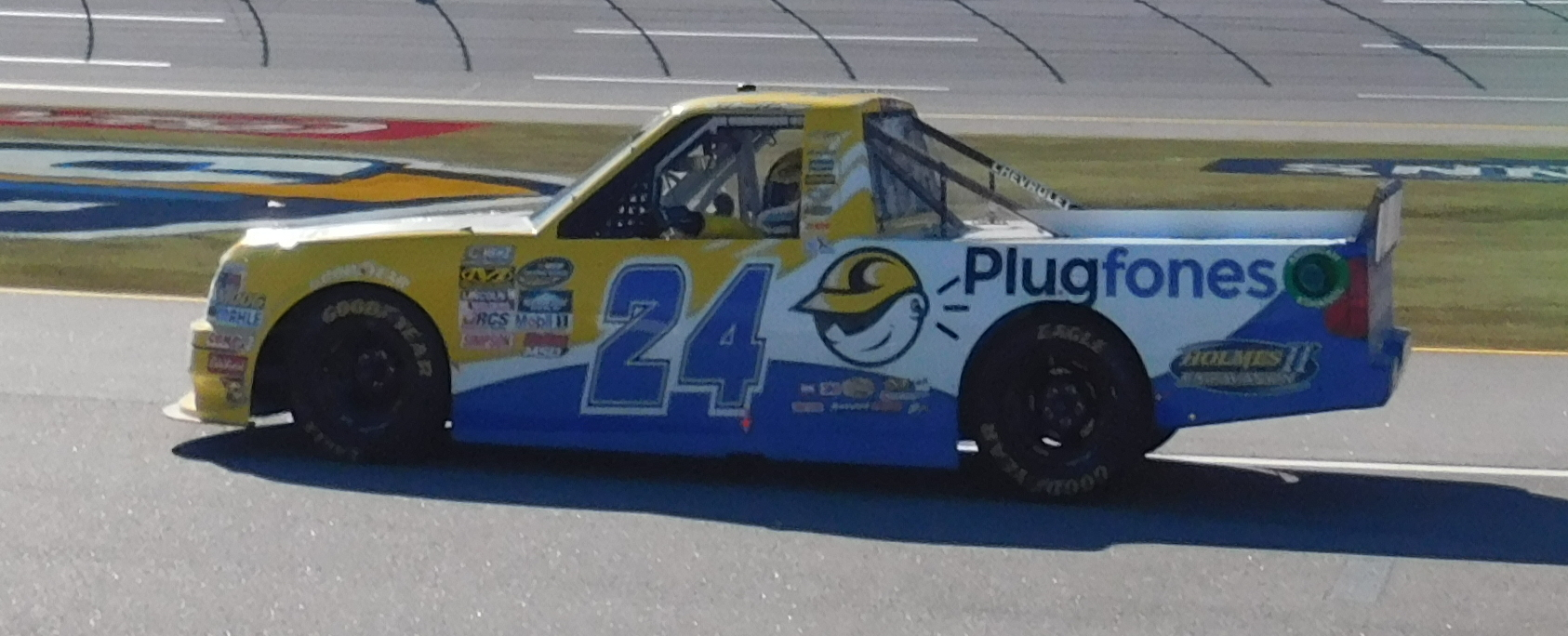
Enfinger's race-winning No. 24 truck for GMS Racing at Talladega in 2016

Enfinger returned to the Truck Series in 2016, driving the No. 33 Chevrolet Silverado full-time for GMS Racing. He began the year off with a bang winning his first career pole for the NextEra Energy Resources 250 at Daytona, the season opener, he would finish 20th though in the race after being caught up in the "big one" with six laps to go of the race. He finished in the top-five in the next race, at Atlanta. But, he was still demoted to a part-time role with the No. 24, and replaced by Kaz Grala and Ben Kennedy in the No. 33. Enfinger ran five races later in the season for Gallagher's No. 24 team. For the running of the Fred's 250 at Talladega, Enfinger would start second and would run great all race long, leading the most laps and getting his first career Truck win. This proved to be Enfinger's last race for Gallagher, although he ran the last race of the season at Homestead with RBR Enterprises.

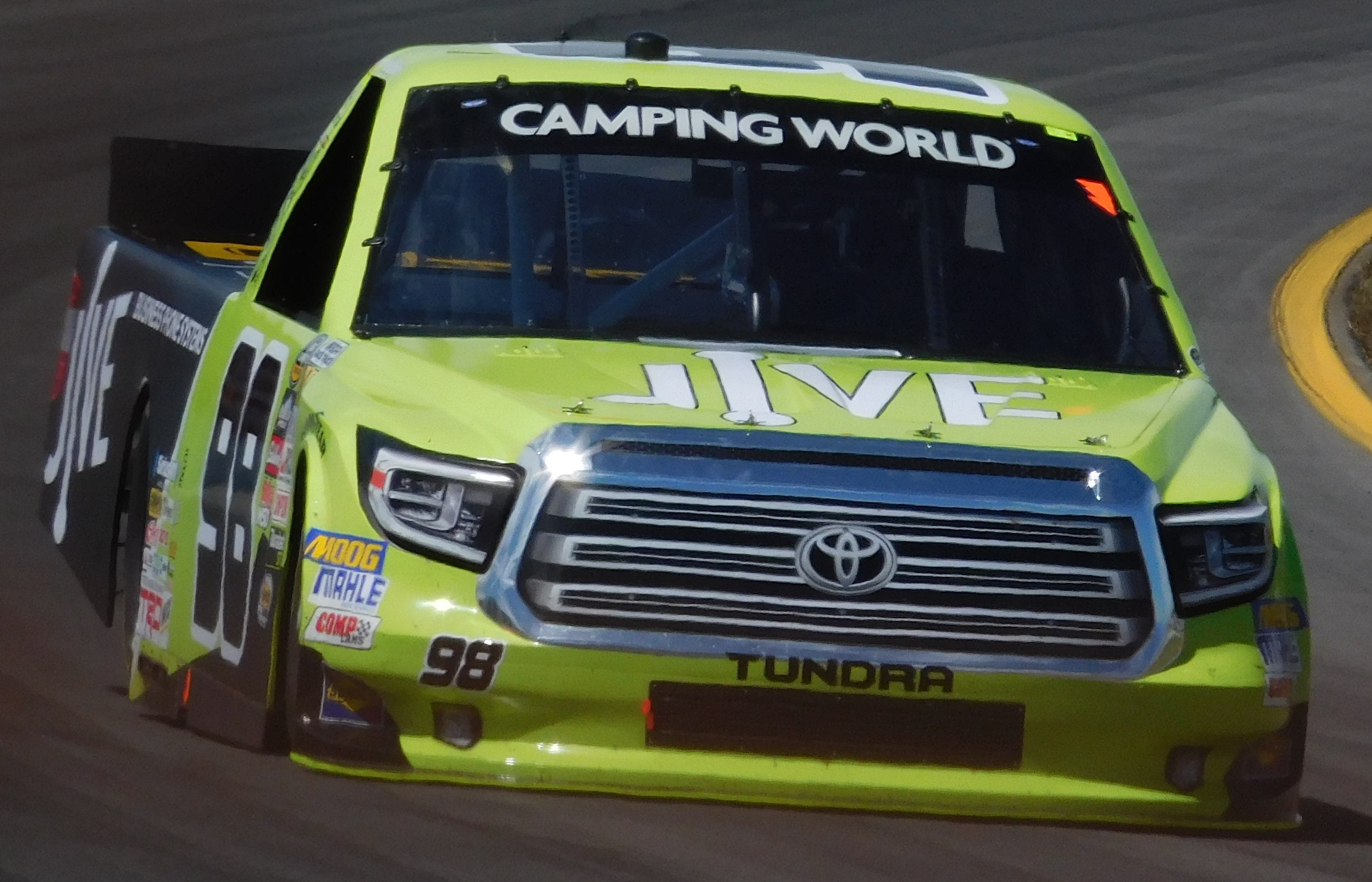
Enfinger in the No. 98 truck for ThorSport Racing at Pocono in 2017

ThorSport Racing hired Enfinger to drive the No. 98 Toyota Tundra full-time in 2017. He finished eleventh in the standings.

In 2018, ThorSport Racing switched to the Ford F-150. Enfinger scored his second career win at Las Vegas and finished fifth in the standings.

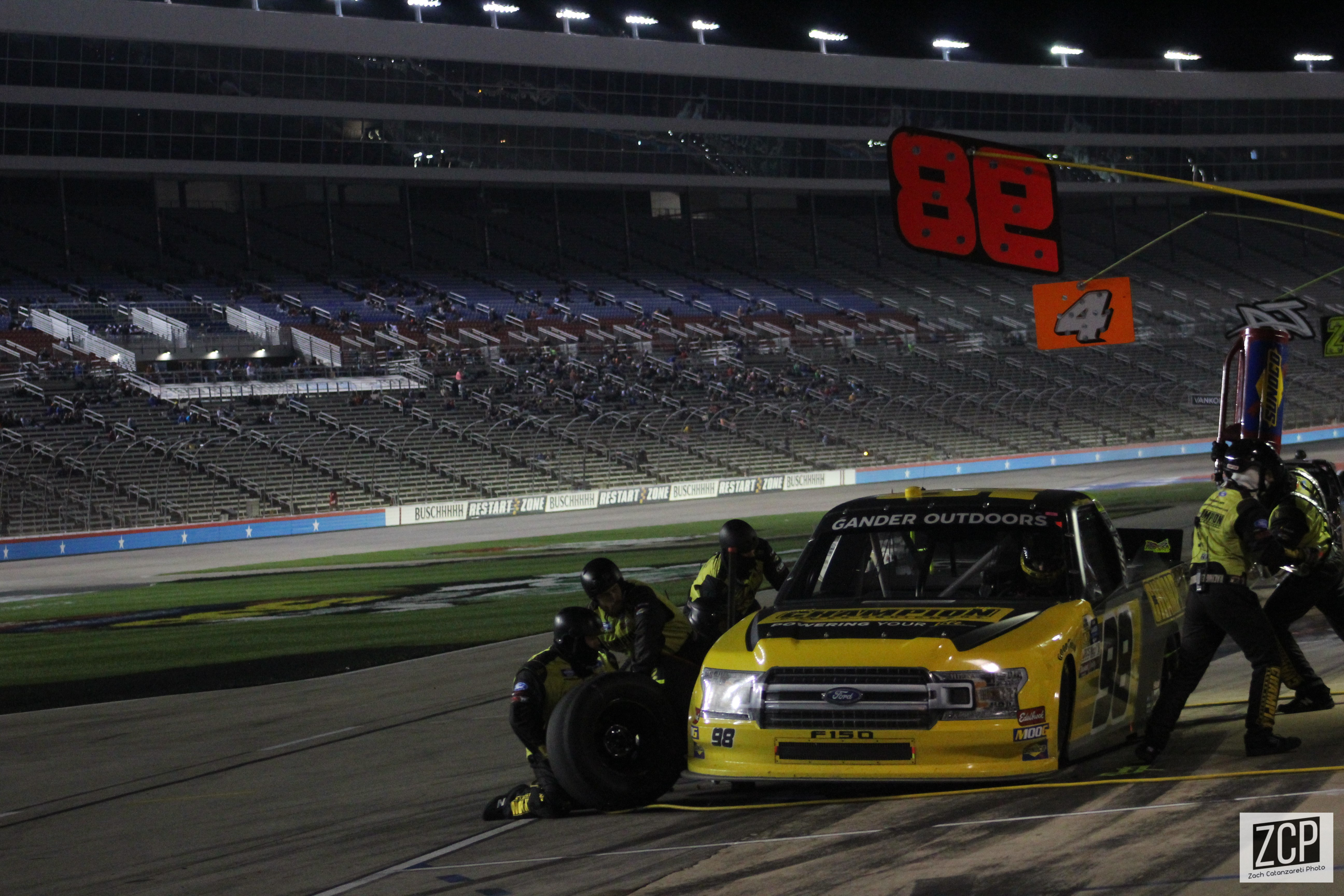
Enfinger making a pit stop in the April 2019 Truck Series race at Texas

In 2019, Enfinger clinched the NASCAR Gander Outdoors Truck Series Regular Season Championship following the Michigan race. He was eliminated from the playoffs at Las Vegas when he finished 31st after experiencing an engine failure that also plagued three other trucks. Ilmor, the manufacturer of the engines, took responsibility for the NT1 engines that suffered from severe detonation due to the combination of the high engine load condition combined with the extreme weather conditions in Las Vegas. Despite Ilmor's announcement, NASCAR denied ThorSport's request to reinstate Enfinger and Johnny Sauter into the playoffs. He finished seventh in the final points standings despite winning no races, with teammate Matt Crafton winning his third career championship, and also had no wins.

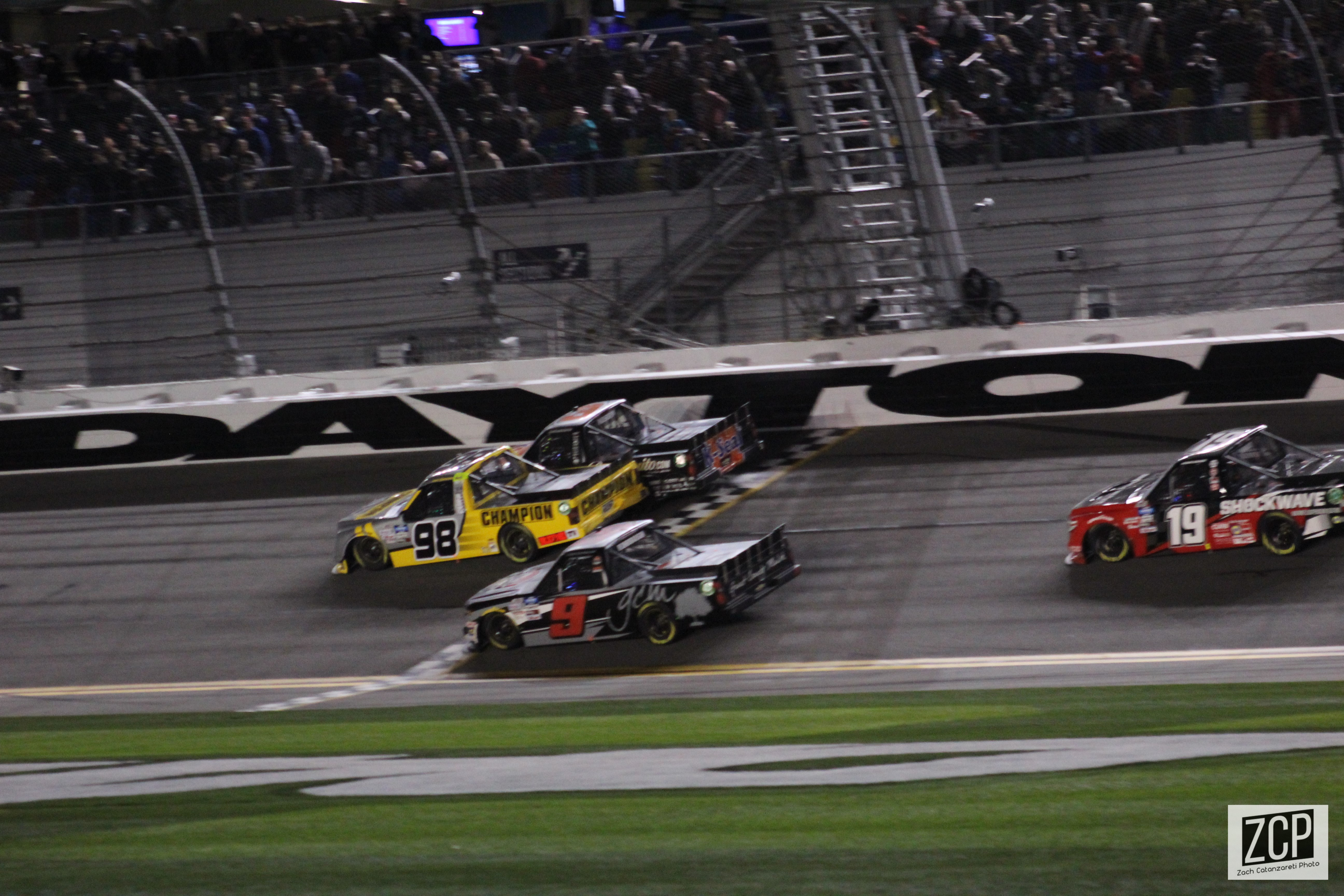
Enfinger's photo finish with Jordan Anderson in the Truck Series season-opener at Daytona in 2020

In 2020, Enfinger broke a 28-race winless streak by winning the season opener at Daytona over Jordan Anderson by 0.010 seconds in overtime, his third career victory and 100th win for Ford in the series. He scored three more wins at Atlanta, Richmond, and Martinsville; the Atlanta and Richmond victories came when he passed leaders Austin Hill and Crafton with one and seven laps to go respectively, while his Martinsville win enabled him to qualify for the Championship Round. Enfinger was the lone non-GMS Racing driver in the final four. He would finish fourth in points.

Due to a lack of sponsorship, Enfinger was reduced to a part-time schedule in 2021, as he shared the No. 98 with former Kyle Busch Motorsports driver Christian Eckes. On March 1, 2021, it was announced that at Las Vegas in March, which was one of Eckes' races in the No. 98, Enfinger would drive the No. 9 truck for CR7 Motorsports, normally driven by the team's owner, Codie Rohrbaugh. Enfinger won the fall race in Las Vegas in 2018. On April 26, CR7 announced that Enfinger would return to the No. 9 in the race at Kansas, which was the next race where Eckes was in the No. 98. While splitting driving duties with ThorSport and CR7, Enfinger was able to compete in 21 of the 22 races during the 2021 season. He accumulated six top-fives and eleven top-tens, finishing eleventh in the point standings.

On May 29, 2021, it was announced that Enfinger would make his debut in the Xfinity Series in the race at Charlotte that day. He drove the No. 26 for Sam Hunt Racing. With the race having practice and qualifying (and therefore, a field of only 36 cars instead of the usual forty) and the car being the slowest in practice, the normal driver Brandon Gdovic decided to step out of the car. Despite never having been in an Xfinity car, Enfinger did qualify for the race. However, he crashed out after making contact with the #13 MBM Motorsports Ford of Chad Finchum.

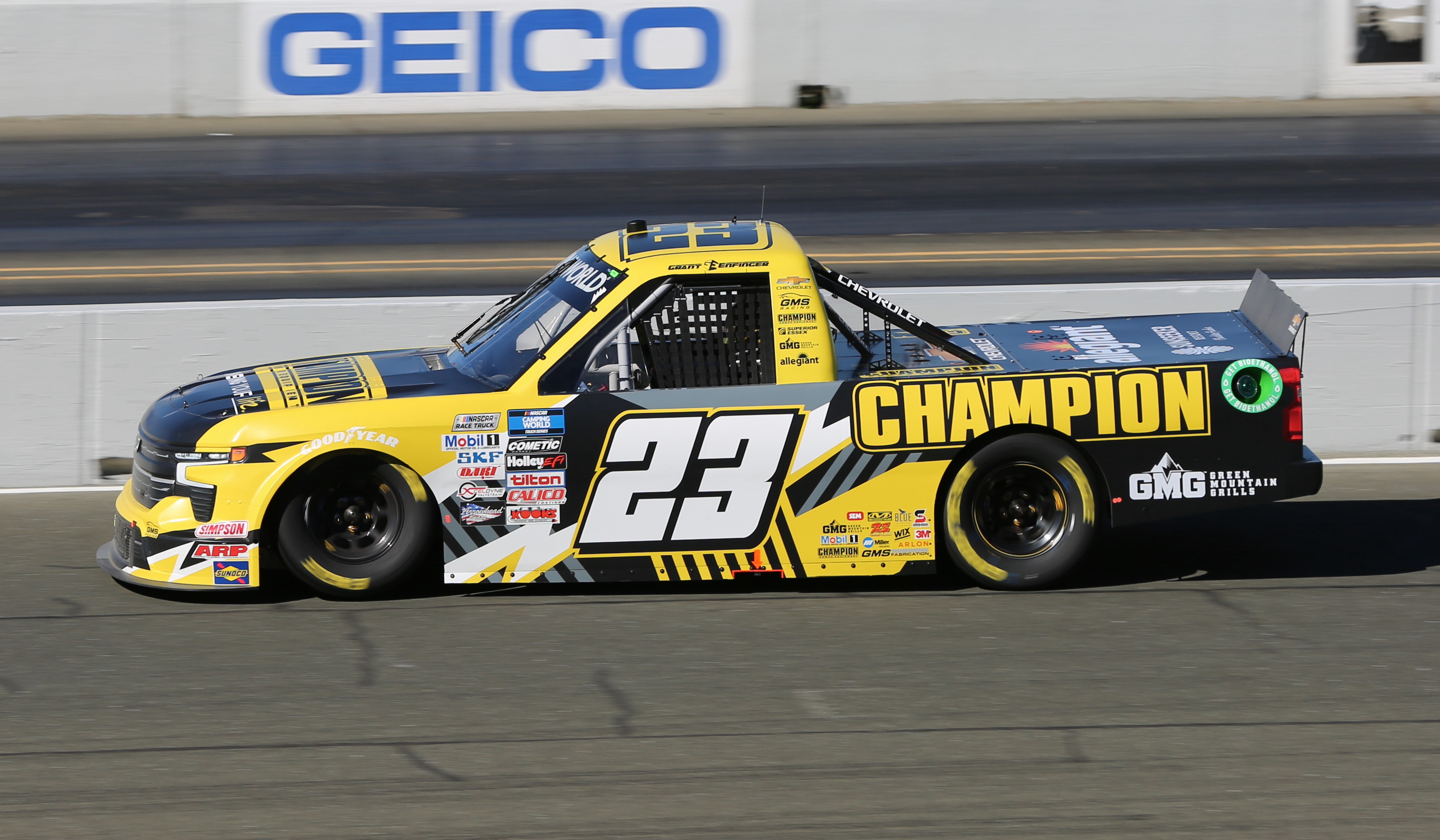
Enfinger's No. 23 truck at Sonoma Raceway in 2022

On October 1, 2021, GMS Racing announced that Enfinger would return to the team in 2022 and drive their No. 23 truck full-time in 2022 and 2023, replacing Chase Purdy. Champion Power Equipment will also move with Enfinger from ThorSport Racing and CR7 Motorsports and sponsor him at GMS for the majority of both years.

Enfinger began the 2022 season with a 29th-place finish at Daytona. He scored three top-fives and seven top-ten finishes to make the playoffs. During the playoffs, Enfinger scored his first win of the season at Indianapolis Raceway Park. He was unable to make the Championship 4 and finished seventh in points.

Enfinger started the 2023 season with a fifth-place finish at Daytona. He scored wins at Kansas, Gateway and Milwaukee. Enfinger's consistency during the season allowed him to make the Playoffs. Enfinger finished fourth at Homestead to make the Championship 4. He finished sixth at Phoenix and second in the final points standings.

Enfinger also returned to ARCA in 2023, driving the No. 97 car for CR7 Motorsports, who he drove part-time for in the Truck Series in 2021, in the race at Charlotte.

On June 8, 2023, Legacy Motor Club announced that Noah Gragson would not run the race at Sonoma due to experiencing concussion-like symptoms after his crash in the previous week's race at Gateway. Enfinger, who drives for LMC co-owner Maury Gallagher's GMS Racing team in the Truck Series, was selected to fill in for Gragson in the No. 42 car. He would make his Cup Series debut and first Cup Series attempt since he failed to qualify for the season-finale at Homestead in 2011. Enfinger would finish 26th.

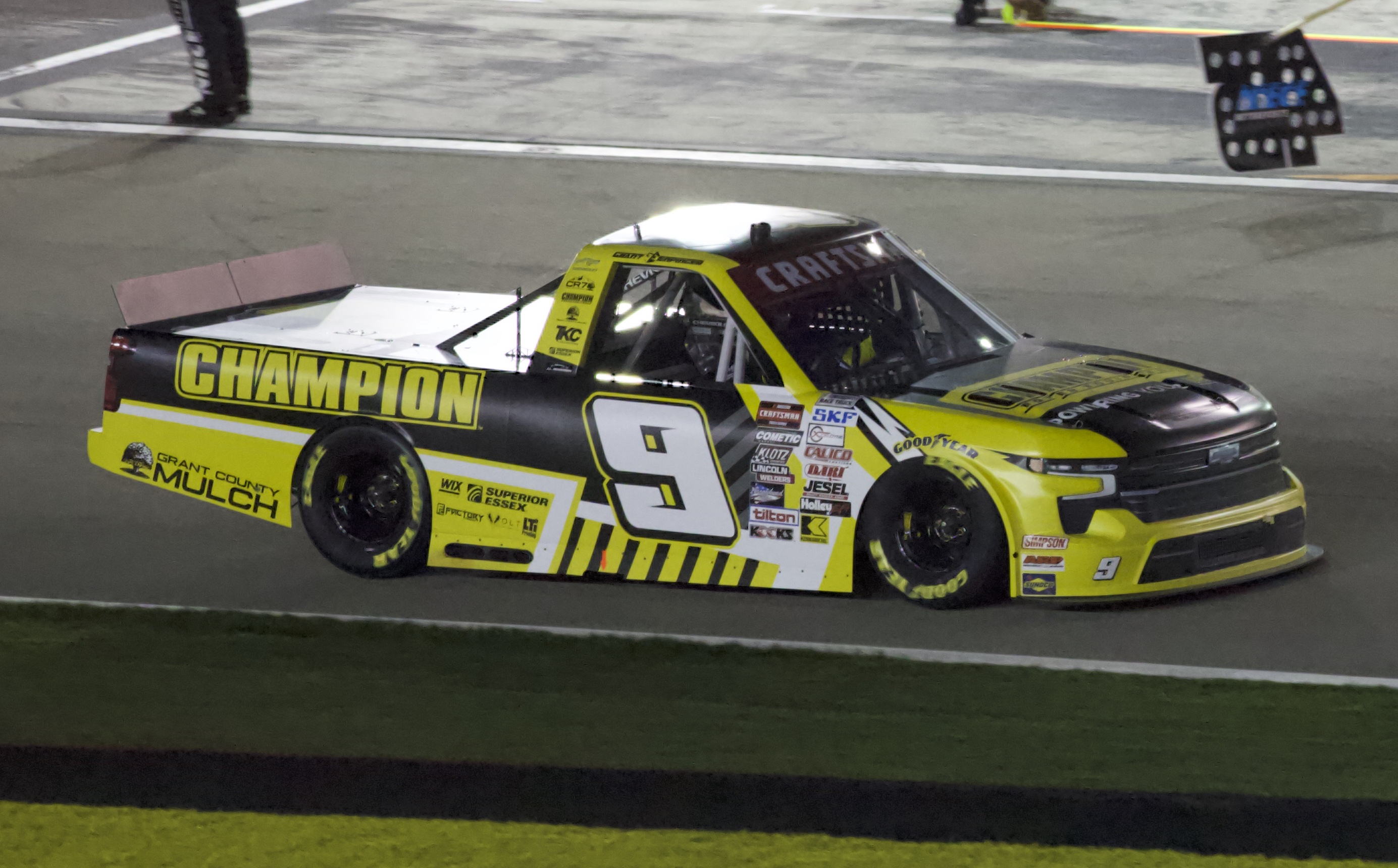
Enfinger's No. 9 truck at Las Vegas Motor Speedway in 2024.

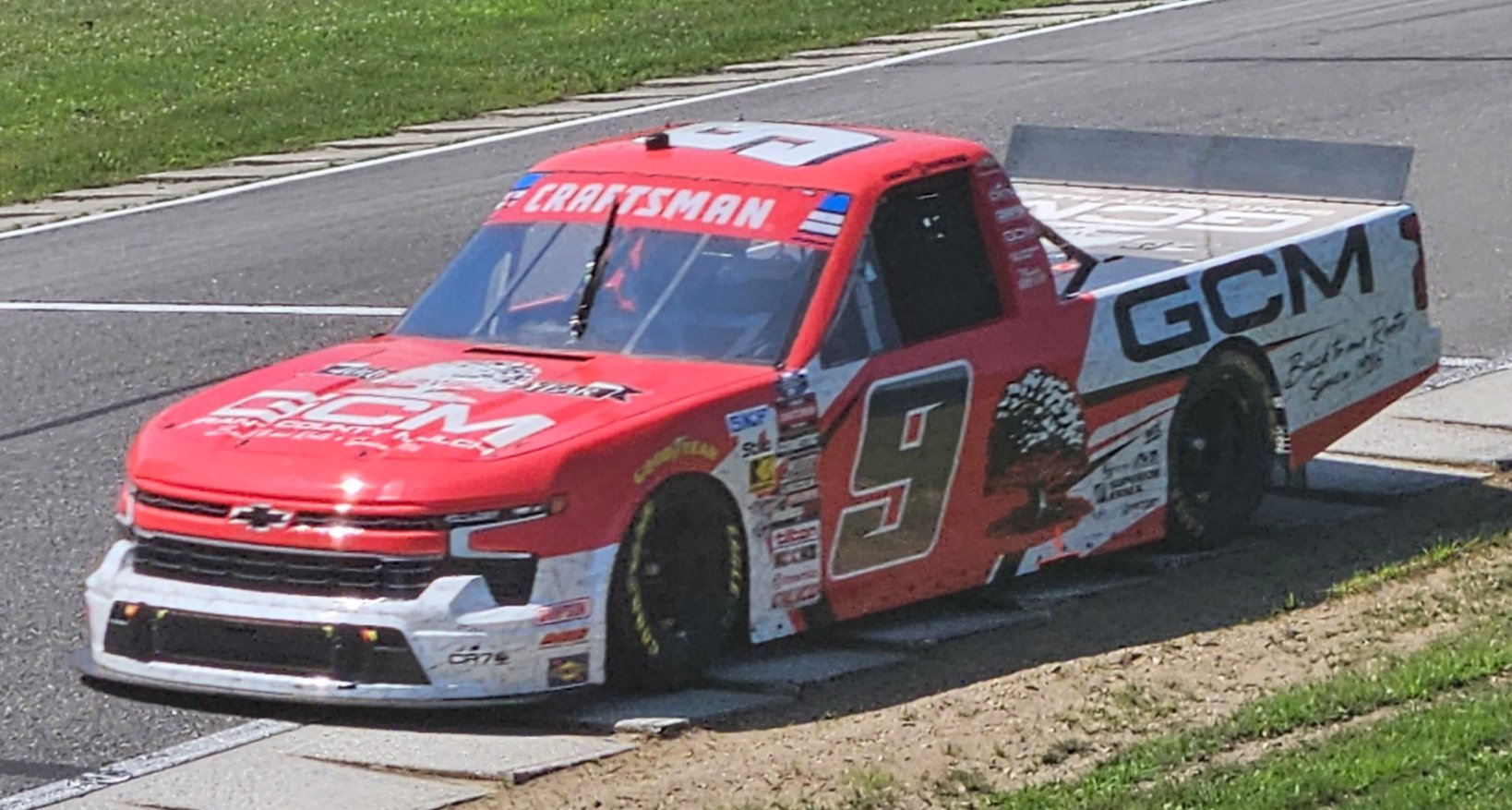
Enfinger's No. 9 truck at Lime Rock Park in 2026.

On December 12, 2023, it was announced that Enfinger will return to CR7 Motorsports and run full-time for the team in 2024, driving their No. 9 truck. He previously ran part-time for the team in 2021. Enfinger started the 2024 season with a 17th-place finish at Daytona. Despite not scoring a win during the regular season, he stayed consistent with five top-fives and eight top-ten finishes to make the playoffs. Enfinger gave CR7 its first win at Talladega and made the Championship 4. He followed it up with another win at Homestead. At Phoenix, Enfinger ran up front and on the last restart, came to pit on a gutsy strategy call, but ultimately finished fourth in point by finishing fifth in the race.

The 2025 season saw Enfinger be slightly more inconsistent. He made the playoffs again and made it to the Round of 8, but was eliminated at Martinsville and finished seventh in points with seven top 5s and fourteen top 10s. 2026 saw Enfinger regress heavily, but still ran strong enough to make the Chase, which was helped heavily by scoring a win in a caution-filled event at Lime Rock.

=== Other racing ===
In March 2019, Enfinger made his Michelin Pilot Challenge sports car debut at Sebring International Raceway, driving a Ford for Multimatic Motorsports alongside ThorSport Racing teammates Matt Crafton, Ben Rhodes, and Myatt Snider.

== Personal life ==
Enfinger was born in Fairhope, Alabama, located in Baldwin County on the Gulf of Mexico, in 1985. Enfinger attended the University of South Alabama, graduating in 2007 with a bachelor's degree in marketing.

Enfinger married Michelle Dupre on January 16, 2016, in Fairhope, Alabama. They have one son, Carson, born in June 2021, and will have a second child as he announced in his post-race interview after winning at Gateway in 2023 that his wife Michelle is pregnant.

== Motorsports career results ==
=== Racing career summary ===
Season	Series	Team	Races	Wins	Top 5	Top 10	Points	Position
2008	ARCA Re/Max Series	Andy Belmont Racing	4	0	0	0	460	58th
2009	ARCA Re/Max Series	RAB Racing	1	0	0	0	1625	23rd
2009	ARCA Re/Max Series	Enfinger Racing	5	0	4	5	1625	23rd
2009	ARCA Re/Max Series	Andy Belmont Racing	1	0	0	0	1625	23rd
2010	ARCA Racing Series	RAB Racing	7	0	3	5	1185	24th
2010	NASCAR Camping World Truck Series	Team Gill Racing	1	0	0	0	97	99th
2011	ARCA Racing Series	Allgaier Motorsports	19	0	7	14	4590	4th
2011	NASCAR Camping World Truck Series	Allgaier Motorsports	1	0	0	0	56	52nd
2011	NASCAR Camping World Truck Series	Bragg Racing Group	1	0	0	0	56	52nd
2012	ARCA Racing Series	Allgaier Motorsports	3	0	2	2	1120	27th
2012	ARCA Racing Series	Bragg Racing Group	3	0	1	2	1120	27th
2012	NASCAR Camping World Truck Series	Bragg Racing Group	1	0	0	0	73	46th
2012	NASCAR Camping World Truck Series	Turn One Racing	1	0	0	0	73	46th
2012	NASCAR Camping World Truck Series	Brad Keselowski Racing	1	0	0	0	73	46th
2013	ARCA Racing Series	Team BCR Racing	9	2	4	5	1970	15th
2014	ARCA Racing Series	Team BCR Racing	11	4	6	10	4985	**2nd**
2014	ARCA Racing Series	GMS Racing	9	2	5	5	4985	**2nd**
2015	ARCA Racing Series	GMS Racing	20	6	13	16	5085	**1st**
2016	ARCA Racing Series	Cunningham Motorsports	1	0	0	0	400	62nd
2016	ARCA Racing Series	GMS Racing	1	1	1	1	400	62nd
2016	NASCAR Camping World Truck Series	GMS Racing	7	1	2	5	185	22nd
2016	NASCAR Camping World Truck Series	RBR Enterprises	1	0	0	0	185	22nd
2017	ARCA Racing Series	Allgaier Motorsports	1	1	1	1	245	71st
2017	NASCAR Camping World Truck Series	ThorSport Racing	23	0	9	15	718	11th
2018	ARCA Racing Series	Mason Mitchell Motorsports	1	0	0	0	170	87th
2018	NASCAR Camping World Truck Series	ThorSport Racing	23	1	7	15	2284	5th
2019	NASCAR Gander Outdoors Truck Series	ThorSport Racing	23	0	10	18	2236	7th
2020	ARCA Menards Series East	Chad Bryant Racing	1	0	1	1	92	19th
2020	NASCAR Gander Outdoors Truck Series	ThorSport Racing	23	4	8	13	4024	4th
2021	CARS Super Late Model Tour	Wade Lopez	1	0	0	0	22	32nd
2021	NASCAR Camping World Truck Series	ThorSport Racing	12	0	5	8	589	11th
2021	NASCAR Camping World Truck Series	CR7 Motorsports	10	0	1	3	589	11th
2021	NASCAR Xfinity Series	Sam Hunt Racing	1	0	0	0	0	NC†
2022	ARCA Menards Series	GMS Racing	1	0	1	1	41	73rd
2022	NASCAR Camping World Truck Series	GMS Racing	23	1	7	12	2266	7th
2023	ASA STARS National Tour	Go Fas Racing	2	0	0	0	50	65th
2023	ARCA Menards Series East	CR7 Motorsports	1	0	1	1	39	31st
2023	ARCA Menards Series	CR7 Motorsports	2	0	2	2	79	46th
2023	NASCAR Craftsman Truck Series	GMS Racing	23	3	9	13	4031	**2nd**
2023	NASCAR Cup Series	Legacy Motor Club	1	0	0	0	0	NC†
2024	ARCA Menards Series West	Sigma Performance Services	1	0	1	1	41	39th
2024	ARCA Menards Series	Sigma Performance Services	1	0	1	1	41	76th
2024	NASCAR Craftsman Truck Series	CR7 Motorsports	23	2	8	13	4032	4th
2025	ARCA Menards Series	CR7 Motorsports	1	0	1	1	43	86th
2025	NASCAR Craftsman Truck Series	CR7 Motorsports	25	0	7	14	2198	7th
2026	NASCAR Craftsman Truck Series	CR7 Motorsports	25	1	3	8	2210	9th

^{†} As Enfinger was a guest driver, he was ineligible for championship points.

=== NASCAR ===
(key) (Bold – Pole position awarded by qualifying time. Italics – Pole position earned by points standings or practice time. * – Most laps led.)

==== Cup Series ====
NASCAR Cup Series results
Year	Team	No.	Make	1	2	3	4	5	6	7	8	9	10	11	12	13	14	15	16	17	18	19	20	21	22	23	24	25	26	27	28	29	30	31	32	33	34	35	36	NCSC	Pts	Ref
2011	Sinica Motorsports	93	Chevy	DAY	PHO	LVS	BRI	CAL	MAR	TEX	TAL	RCH	DAR	DOV	CLT	KAN	POC	MCH	SON	DAY	KEN	NHA	IND	POC	GLN	MCH	BRI	ATL	RCH	CHI	NHA	DOV	KAN	CLT	TAL	MAR	TEX	PHO	HOM; DNQ	84th	0^{1}	
2023	Legacy Motor Club	42	Chevy	DAY	CAL	LVS	PHO	ATL	COA	RCH	BRD	MAR	TAL	DOV	KAN	DAR	CLT	GTW	SON; 26	NSH	CSC	ATL	NHA	POC	RCH	MCH	IRC	GLN	DAY	DAR	KAN	BRI	TEX	TAL	ROV	LVS	HOM	MAR	PHO	56th	0^{1}	

==== Xfinity Series ====
NASCAR Xfinity Series results
Year	Team	No.	Make	1	2	3	4	5	6	7	8	9	10	11	12	13	14	15	16	17	18	19	20	21	22	23	24	25	26	27	28	29	30	31	32	33	NXSC	Pts	Ref
2021	Sam Hunt Racing	26	Toyota	DAY	DRC	HOM	LVS	PHO	ATL	MAR	TAL	DAR	DOV	COA	CLT; 36	MOH	TEX	NSH	POC	ROA	ATL	NHA	GLN	IRC	MCH	DAY	DAR	RCH	BRI	LVS	TAL	ROV	TEX	KAN	MAR	PHO	104th	0^{1}	

==== Truck Series ====
NASCAR Truck Series results
Year	Team	No.	Make	1	2	3	4	5	6	7	8	9	10	11	12	13	14	15	16	17	18	19	20	21	22	23	24	25	NTSC	Pts	Ref
2010	Team Gill Racing	95	Ford	DAY	ATL	MAR	NSH	KAN	DOV	CLT	TEX	MCH	IOW	GTY	IRP	POC	NSH	DAR	BRI	CHI	KEN	NHA	LVS	MAR	TAL; 22	TEX	PHO	HOM	99th	97	
2011	Rosenblum Racing	28	Chevy	DAY; DNQ	PHO	DAR	MAR	NSH	DOV	CLT	KAN	TEX	KEN	IOW	NSH	IRP	POC	MCH	BRI	ATL	CHI	NHA	KEN	LVS					52nd	56	
2011	Bragg Racing Group	82	Ford																						TAL; 12				52nd	56	
2011	Allgaier Motorsports	36	Ram																							MAR; 20	TEX	HOM	52nd	56	
2012	Bragg Racing Group	82	Ford	DAY; 12	MAR																								46th	73	
2012	Turn One Racing	60	Chevy			CAR; 36	KAN	CLT	DOV	TEX	KEN	IOW	CHI	POC	MCH														46th	73	
2012	Allgaier Motorsports	36	Ram													BRI; DNQ	ATL	IOW	KEN			MAR; DNQ	TEX	PHO	HOM				46th	73	
2012	Brad Keselowski Racing	29	Ram																	LVS; 12	TAL								46th	73	
2016	GMS Racing	33	Chevy	**DAY**; 20	ATL; 5	MAR	KAN	DOV	CLT	TEX	IOW	GTW																	22nd	185	
2016	GMS Racing	24	Chevy										KEN; 12	ELD	POC	BRI	MCH; 8	MSP	CHI; 6	NHA	LVS; 10	TAL; 1*	MAR	TEX	PHO				22nd	185	
2016	RBR Enterprises	92	Ford																							HOM; 23			22nd	185	
2017	ThorSport Racing	98	Toyota	DAY; 16	ATL; 8	MAR; 16	KAN; 11	CLT; 7	DOV; 3	TEX; 3	GTW; 5	IOW; 4	KEN; 28	ELD; 4	POC; 13	MCH; 8	BRI; 4	MSP; 13	CHI; 5	NHA; 4	LVS; 9	TAL; 4	MAR; 12	TEX; 7	PHO; 24	HOM; 8			11th	718	
2018	ThorSport Racing	98	Ford	DAY; 6	ATL; 9	LVS; 4	MAR; 4	DOV; 14	KAN; 8	CLT; 12	TEX; 4	IOW; 11	**GTW**; 21	CHI; 8	KEN; 6	ELD; 2	POC; 6	MCH; 7	BRI; 10	MSP; 17	LVS; 1*	TAL; 19*	MAR; 14	TEX; 12	PHO; 4	**HOM**; 2			5th	2284	
2019	ThorSport Racing	98	Ford	DAY; 2	ATL; 3	LVS; 11	MAR; 7	**TEX**; 4	DOV; 4	KAN; 7	CLT; 9	TEX; 4*	IOW; 4	GTW; 6	CHI; 16	**KEN**; 24	POC; 10	ELD; 3	MCH; 7	BRI; 5	MSP; 13	LVS; 31	TAL; 10	MAR; 4	PHO; 5	HOM; 7			7th	2236	
2020	ThorSport Racing	98	Ford	DAY; 1*	LVS; 31	CLT; 12	ATL; 1	HOM; 17	POC; 11	KEN; 12	TEX; 8	KAN; 3	KAN; 3	MCH; 33*	DRC; 7	DOV; 13	GTW; 8	DAR; 4	RCH; 1	BRI; 6	LVS; 6	TAL; 13	KAN; 4	TEX; 32	MAR; 1	PHO; 13			4th	4024	
2021	ThorSport Racing	98	Toyota	DAY; 11	DRC		ATL; 11	BRD; 6	RCH; 8		DAR; 5			TEX; 3	NSH; 3		KNX; 3			DAR; 6	BRI; 2		TAL; 21	MAR; 21					11th	589	
2021	CR7 Motorsports	9	Chevy			LVS; 7				KAN; 17		COA; 4	CLT; 14			POC; 36		GLN; 38	GTW; 25			LVS; 7			PHO; 13				11th	589	
2022	GMS Racing	23	Chevy	DAY; 29	LVS; 23	ATL; 12	COA; 10	MAR; 8	BRD; 8	DAR; 3	KAN; 3	TEX; 11	CLT; 2	GTW; 28	SON; 11	KNX; 8	NSH; 32	MOH; 11	POC; 17	IRP; 1	RCH; 4	KAN; 5	BRI; 4	TAL; 29	HOM; 14	PHO; 6			7th	2266	
2023	GMS Racing	23	Chevy	DAY; 5	LVS; 9	ATL; 19	COA; 12	TEX; 17	BRD; 5	MAR; 14	KAN; 1*	DAR; 14	NWS; 10	CLT; 5	GTW; 1*	NSH; 13	MOH; 11	POC; 5	RCH; 9	IRP; 12	**MLW**; 1*	KAN; 17	BRI; 3	TAL; 13	HOM; 4	PHO; 6			2nd	4031	
2024	CR7 Motorsports	9	Chevy	DAY; 17	ATL; 25	LVS; 9	BRI; 9	COA; 12	MAR; 22	TEX; 29	KAN; 12	DAR; 16	NWS; 2	CLT; 3	GTW; 17	NSH; 6	POC; 2	IRP; 3	RCH; 4*	MLW; 13	BRI; 17	KAN; 9	TAL; 1*	HOM; 1	MAR; 9	PHO; 5			4th	4032	
2025	CR7 Motorsports	9	Chevy	DAY; 4	ATL; 10	LVS; 2	HOM; 9	MAR; 27	BRI; 12	CAR; 5	TEX; 23	KAN; 9	NWS; 5	CLT; 6	NSH; 10	MCH; 2	POC; 17	LRP; 11	IRP; 4	GLN; 24	RCH; 13	DAR; 3	BRI; 21	NHA; 6	ROV; 7	TAL; 36	MAR; 12	PHO; 24	7th	2198	
2026	CR7 Motorsports	9	Chevy	DAY; 29	ATL; 22	STP; 22	DAR; 7	CAR; 5	BRI; 27	TEX; 32	GLN; 33	DOV; 15	CLT; 16	NSH; 7	MCH; 11	COR; 29	LRP; 1	NWS; 25	IRP; 14	RCH; 5	NHA; 13	BRI; 10	KAN; 31	CLT; 12	PHO; 9	TAL; 24	MAR; 11	HOM; 9	9th	2210	
2027	CR7 Motorsports	9	Chevy	DAY	ATL	STP	DAR	BRI	TEX	KAN	NWS	CLT	NSS	POC	MCH	LRP	ATL	IRP	BRI	BGS	MSP	NHA	KAN	CLT	PHO	TAL	MAR	HOM			

^{*} Season still in progress
^{1} Ineligible for series points

=== ARCA Menards Series ===
(key) (Bold – Pole position awarded by qualifying time. Italics – Pole position earned by points standings or practice time. * – Most laps led.)

ARCA Menards Series results
Year	Team	No.	Make	1	2	3	4	5	6	7	8	9	10	11	12	13	14	15	16	17	18	19	20	21	AMSC	Pts	Ref
2008	Andy Belmont Racing	14	Ford	DAY	SLM	IOW; 39	KAN; 36	CAR	KEN; 39	TOL	POC	MCH	CAY	KEN	BLN	POC	NSH	ISF	DSF	CHI	SLM; DNQ	NJE	TAL	TOL; 33	58th	460	
2009	RAB Racing	09	Ford	DAY	SLM	CAR; 19																			23rd	1625	
2009	Enfinger Racing	83	Ford				TAL; 3	KEN	TOL	POC	MCH	MFD	IOW	KEN; 2				CHI; 2	TOL	DSF	NJE	SLM	KAN; 3	CAR; 7	23rd	1625	
2009	Andy Belmont Racing	1	Ford												BLN; 13	POC	ISF								23rd	1625	
2010	RAB Racing	09	Ford	DAY; 30	PBE	SLM	TEX; 3	TAL; 6*	TOL	POC	MCH; 35	IOW; 3	MFD	POC	BLN	NJE	ISF	CHI; 3	DSF	TOL	SLM	KAN	CAR; 9		24th	1185	
2011	Allgaier Motorsports	36	Dodge	DAY; 9	TAL; 13	SLM; 10	TOL; 2		CHI; 8	POC; 3		WIN; 9	**BLN**; 3*	IOW; 4	IRP; 9	POC; 5		MAD; 14		SLM; 22	KAN; 3	TOL; 5			4th	4590	
2011	Allgaier Motorsports	36	Chevy					NJE; 10									ISF; 12		DSF; 10						4th	4590	
2011	Allgaier Motorsports	36	Ford								MCH; 14														4th	4590	
2012	BRG Motorsports	61	Ford	DAY	MOB; 13	SLM	TAL																		27th	1120	
2012	Allgaier Motorsports	99	Ford					TOL; 3	ELK	POC	MCH	WIN	NJE			IRP; 27									27th	1120	
2012	Allgaier Motorsports	36	Dodge											IOW; 2	CHI										27th	1120	
2012	Team BCR Racing	09	Ford														POC; 8	BLN	ISF	MAD	SLM	DSF	KAN; 3		27th	1120	
2013	Team BCR Racing	09	Ford	DAY; 39																					15th	1970	
2013	Team BCR Racing	90	Ford		MOB; 1*	SLM; 7	TAL; 16	TOL; 15	ELK	POC	MCH; 5	ROA	WIN	CHI	NJE	POC	BLN	ISF	MAD	DSF	IOW; 1	SLM	KEN; 4	KAN; 32	15th	1970	
2014	Team BCR Racing	90	Ford	DAY; 1*	MOB; 1*	SLM; 1*	**TAL**; 9*	TOL; 12*	NJE; 4	POC; 8	MCH; 8	ELK; 1*	WIN; 5	CHI; 7											2nd	4985	
2014	GMS Racing	90	Chevy												IRP; 4	POC; 26	BLN; 1*	ISF; 3*	MAD; 15*	DSF; 1*	SLM; 4	KEN; 30	KAN; 17		2nd	4985	
2015	GMS Racing	23	Chevy	DAY; 1*	MOB; 1*	NSH; 1*	SLM; 13	TAL; 28	**TOL**; 19*	NJE; 4	POC; 2	MCH; 8	CHI; 2	WIN; 2	IOW; 8	IRP; 8	POC; 2	**BLN**; 1*	**ISF**; 20	**DSF**; 1	SLM; 1	KEN; 5	KAN; 3		1st	5085	
2016	GMS Racing	23	Chevy	DAY	NSH	SLM	TAL	TOL	NJE	POC	MCH	MAD	WIN	IOW	IRP	POC; 1	BLN	ISF							62nd	400	
2016	Cunningham Motorsports	22	Ford																**DSF**; 17*	SLM	CHI	KEN	KAN		62nd	400	
2017	Allgaier Motorsports	16	Chevy	DAY	NSH	SLM	TAL	TOL	ELK	POC	MCH	MAD	IOW	IRP	POC	WIN	ISF; 1*	ROA	DSF	SLM	CHI	KEN	KAN		71st	245	
2018	Mason Mitchell Motorsports	78	Chevy	DAY	NSH	SLM	TAL	TOL; 12	CLT	POC	MCH	MAD	GTW	CHI	IOW	ELK	POC	ISF	BLN	DSF	SLM	IRP	KAN		87th	170	
2022	GMS Racing	44	Chevy	DAY	PHO	TAL	KAN	CLT	IOW	BLN	ELK	MOH	POC	IRP	MCH	GLN	ISF	MLW	DSF	KAN	BRI	SLM	TOL; 3		73rd	41	
2023	CR7 Motorsports	97	Chevy	DAY	PHO	TAL	KAN	CLT; 4	BLN	ELK	MOH	IOW	POC	MCH	IRP	GLN	ISF	MLW; 5	DSF	KAN	BRI	SLM	TOL		46th	79	
2024	Sigma Performance Services	23	Chevy	DAY	PHO; 3	TAL	DOV	KAN	CLT	IOW	MOH	BLN	IRP	SLM	ELK	MCH	ISF	MLW	DSF	GLN	BRI	KAN	TOL		76th	41	
2025	CR7 Motorsports	97	Chevy	DAY	PHO	TAL	KAN	CLT; 2	MCH	BLN	ELK	LRP	DOV	IRP	IOW	GLN	ISF	MAD	DSF	BRI	SLM	KAN	TOL		86th	43	

==== ARCA Menards Series East ====
ARCA Menards Series East results
Year	Team	No.	Make	1	2	3	4	5	6	7	8	AMSEC	Pts	Ref
2020	Chad Bryant Racing	77	Ford	NSM	TOL	DOV	TOL	BRI	**FIF**; 5			19th	92	
2023	CR7 Motorsports	97	Chevy	FIF	DOV	NSV	FRS	IOW	IRP	MLW; 5	BRI	31st	39	

==== ARCA Menards Series West ====
ARCA Menards Series West results
Year	Team	No.	Make	1	2	3	4	5	6	7	8	9	10	11	12	AMSWC	Pts	Ref
2024	Sigma Performance Services	23	Chevy	PHO; 3	KER	PIR	SON	IRW	IRW	SHA	TRI	MAD	AAS	KER	PHO	39th	41	

=== CARS Super Late Model Tour ===
(key)

CARS Super Late Model Tour results
Year	Team	No.	Make	1	2	3	4	5	6	7	8	CSLMTC	Pts	Ref
2021	Wade Lopez	96	Chevy	HCY	GPS	NSH	JEN	HCY	MMS; 11	TCM	SBO	32nd	22	

=== ASA STARS National Tour ===
(key) (Bold – Pole position awarded by qualifying time. Italics – Pole position earned by points standings or practice time. * – Most laps led. ** – All laps led.)

ASA STARS National Tour results
Year	Team	No.	Make	1	2	3	4	5	6	7	8	9	10	ASNTC	Pts	Ref
2023	Go Fas Racing	32	Chevy	FIF; 31	MAD	NWS; 23	HCY	MLW	AND	WIR	TOL	WIN	NSV	65th	50	
