= 2023 Toyota/Save Mart 350 =

NASCAR Cup Series race

Race details
- Race 16 of 36 in the 2023 NASCAR Cup Series
- Date: June 11, 2023
- Location: Sonoma Raceway in Sonoma, California
- Course: Permanent racing facility
- Course length: 1.99 miles (3.20 km)
- Distance: 110 laps, 218.9 mi (352.285 km)

Pole position
Driver	Denny Hamlin	Joe Gibbs Racing
- Time: 1:17.719

Most laps led
Driver	Martin Truex Jr.	Joe Gibbs Racing
- Laps: 51

Winner
No. 19	Martin Truex Jr.	Joe Gibbs Racing

Television in the United States
- Network: Fox
- Announcers: Mike Joy, Clint Bowyer, and Jamie McMurray

Radio in the United States
- Radio: PRN
- Booth announcers: Doug Rice and Mark Garrow
- Turn announcers: Pat Patterson (2, 3, & 3a), Doug Turnbull (4a & 7a), Brad Gillie (8 & 9), and Rob Albright (10 & 11)

The 2023 Toyota/Save Mart 350 was a NASCAR Cup Series race held on June 11, 2023, at Sonoma Raceway in Sonoma, California. Contested over 110 laps on the 1.99-mile (3.20 km) road course, it was the 16th race of the 2023 NASCAR Cup Series season.

== Report ==
=== Background ===
Layout of Sonoma Raceway, the track where the race was held.

Sonoma Raceway is a 1.99-mile (3.20 km) road course and drag strip located on the landform known as Sears Point in the southern Sonoma Mountains in Sonoma, California, U.S. The road course features 12 turns on a hilly course with 160 feet (49 m) of total elevation change. It is host to one of only seven NASCAR Cup Series races each year that are run on road courses. It is also host to the NTT IndyCar Series and several other auto races and motorcycle races such as the American Federation of Motorcyclists series. Sonoma Raceway continues to host amateur, or club racing events which may or may not be open to the general public. The largest such car club is the Sports Car Club of America. In 2022, the race was reverted to racing the club configuration.

Grant Enfinger replaced Noah Gragson for this race, after Gragson was diagnosed for concussion-like symptoms as a result of a brake failure the race prior.

==== Entry list ====
- (R) denotes rookie driver.
- (i) denotes the driver ineligible for series driver points.

No.	Driver	Team	Manufacturer
1	Ross Chastain	Trackhouse Racing	Chevrolet
2	Austin Cindric	Team Penske	Ford
3	Austin Dillon	Richard Childress Racing	Chevrolet
4	Kevin Harvick	Stewart-Haas Racing	Ford
5	Kyle Larson	Hendrick Motorsports	Chevrolet
6	Brad Keselowski	RFK Racing	Ford
7	Corey LaJoie	Spire Motorsports	Chevrolet
8	Kyle Busch	Richard Childress Racing	Chevrolet
9	Chase Elliott	Hendrick Motorsports	Chevrolet
10	Aric Almirola	Stewart-Haas Racing	Ford
11	Denny Hamlin	Joe Gibbs Racing	Toyota
12	Ryan Blaney	Team Penske	Ford
14	Chase Briscoe	Stewart-Haas Racing	Ford
15	Andy Lally	Rick Ware Racing	Ford
16	A. J. Allmendinger	Kaulig Racing	Chevrolet
17	Chris Buescher	RFK Racing	Ford
19	Martin Truex Jr.	Joe Gibbs Racing	Toyota
20	Christopher Bell	Joe Gibbs Racing	Toyota
21	Harrison Burton	Wood Brothers Racing	Ford
22	Joey Logano	Team Penske	Ford
23	Bubba Wallace	23XI Racing	Toyota
24	William Byron	Hendrick Motorsports	Chevrolet
31	Justin Haley	Kaulig Racing	Chevrolet
34	Michael McDowell	Front Row Motorsports	Ford
38	Zane Smith (i)	Front Row Motorsports	Ford
41	Ryan Preece	Stewart-Haas Racing	Ford
42	Grant Enfinger (i)	Legacy Motor Club	Chevrolet
43	Erik Jones	Legacy Motor Club	Chevrolet
45	Tyler Reddick	23XI Racing	Toyota
47	Ricky Stenhouse Jr.	JTG Daugherty Racing	Chevrolet
48	Alex Bowman	Hendrick Motorsports	Chevrolet
51	Todd Gilliland	Rick Ware Racing	Ford
54	Ty Gibbs (R)	Joe Gibbs Racing	Toyota
77	Ty Dillon	Spire Motorsports	Chevrolet
78	Josh Bilicki (i)	Live Fast Motorsports	Chevrolet
99	Daniel Suárez	Trackhouse Racing	Chevrolet
Official entry list

== Practice ==
Kyle Larson was the fastest in the practice session with a time of 1:18.099 seconds and a speed of 91.730 mph (147.625 km/h).

=== Practice results ===
Pos	No.	Driver	Team	Manufacturer	Time	Speed
1	5	Kyle Larson	Hendrick Motorsports	Chevrolet	1:18.099	91.730
2	19	Martin Truex Jr.	Joe Gibbs Racing	Toyota	1:18.657	91.079
3	16	A. J. Allmendinger	Kaulig Racing	Chevrolet	1:18.708	91.020
Official practice results

== Qualifying ==
Denny Hamlin scored the pole for the race with a time of 1:17.719 and a speed of 92.178 mph (148.346 km/h).

=== Qualifying results ===
Pos	No.	Driver	Team	Manufacturer	R1	R2
1	11	Denny Hamlin	Joe Gibbs Racing	Toyota	1:17.826	1:17.719
2	45	Tyler Reddick	23XI Racing	Toyota	1:18.295	1:17.812
3	34	Michael McDowell	Front Row Motorsports	Ford	1:17.768	1:17.819
4	20	Christopher Bell	Joe Gibbs Racing	Toyota	1:17.973	1:17.974
5	16	A. J. Allmendinger	Kaulig Racing	Chevrolet	1:17.981	1:17.977
6	54	Ty Gibbs (R)	Joe Gibbs Racing	Toyota	1:18.287	1:18.023
7	17	Chris Buescher	RFK Racing	Ford	1:17.909	1:18.030
8	19	Martin Truex Jr.	Joe Gibbs Racing	Toyota	1:18.091	1:18.094
9	99	Daniel Suárez	Trackhouse Racing	Chevrolet	1:18.364	1:18.339
10	9	Chase Elliott	Hendrick Motorsports	Chevrolet	1:17.894	1:18.460
11	3	Austin Dillon	Richard Childress Racing	Chevrolet	1:18.056	—
12	8	Kyle Busch	Richard Childress Racing	Chevrolet	1:18.122	—
13	47	Ricky Stenhouse Jr.	JTG Daugherty Racing	Chevrolet	1:18.359	—
14	48	Alex Bowman	Hendrick Motorsports	Chevrolet	1:18.398	—
15	1	Ross Chastain	Trackhouse Racing	Chevrolet	1:18.426	—
16	5	Kyle Larson	Hendrick Motorsports	Chevrolet	1:18.431	—
17	22	Joey Logano	Team Penske	Ford	1:18.476	—
18	23	Bubba Wallace	23XI Racing	Toyota	1:18.506	—
19	7	Corey LaJoie	Spire Motorsports	Chevrolet	1:18.616	—
20	10	Aric Almirola	Stewart-Haas Racing	Ford	1:18.650	—
21	4	Kevin Harvick	Stewart-Haas Racing	Ford	1:18.680	—
22	41	Ryan Preece	Stewart-Haas Racing	Ford	1:18.680	—
23	31	Justin Haley	Kaulig Racing	Chevrolet	1:18.730	—
24	14	Chase Briscoe	Stewart-Haas Racing	Ford	1:18.762	—
25	6	Brad Keselowski	RFK Racing	Ford	1:18.980	—
26	24	William Byron	Hendrick Motorsports	Chevrolet	1:19.100	—
27	77	Ty Dillon	Spire Motorsports	Chevrolet	1:19.138	—
28	43	Erik Jones	Legacy Motor Club	Chevrolet	1:19.326	—
29	78	Josh Bilicki (i)	Live Fast Motorsports	Chevrolet	1:19.370	—
30	38	Zane Smith (i)	Front Row Motorsports	Ford	1:19.498	—
31	12	Ryan Blaney	Team Penske	Ford	1:19.599	—
32	51	Todd Gilliland	Rick Ware Racing	Ford	1:19.722	—
33	15	Andy Lally	Rick Ware Racing	Ford	1:19.787	—
34	2	Austin Cindric	Team Penske	Ford	1:19.955	—
35	42	Grant Enfinger (i)	Legacy Motor Club	Chevrolet	1:20.223	—
36	21	Harrison Burton	Wood Brothers Racing	Ford	1:20.361	—
Official qualifying results

== Race ==
=== Race results ===
==== Stage results ====
Stage One Laps: 25

Pos	No	Driver	Team	Manufacturer	Points
1	11	Denny Hamlin	Joe Gibbs Racing	Toyota	10
2	19	Martin Truex Jr.	Joe Gibbs Racing	Toyota	9
3	20	Christopher Bell	Joe Gibbs Racing	Toyota	8
4	16	A. J. Allmendinger	Kaulig Racing	Chevrolet	7
5	34	Michael McDowell	Front Row Motorsports	Ford	6
6	45	Tyler Reddick	23XI Racing	Toyota	5
7	17	Chris Buescher	RFK Racing	Ford	4
8	54	Ty Gibbs (R)	Joe Gibbs Racing	Toyota	3
9	48	Alex Bowman	Hendrick Motorsports	Chevrolet	2
10	47	Ricky Stenhouse Jr.	JTG Daugherty Racing	Chevrolet	1
Official stage one results

Stage Two Laps: 30

Pos	No	Driver	Team	Manufacturer	Points
1	8	Kyle Busch	Richard Childress Racing	Chevrolet	10
2	22	Joey Logano	Team Penske	Ford	9
3	1	Ross Chastain	Trackhouse Racing	Chevrolet	8
4	24	William Byron	Hendrick Motorsports	Chevrolet	7
5	47	Ricky Stenhouse Jr.	JTG Daugherty Racing	Chevrolet	6
6	3	Austin Dillon	Richard Childress Racing	Chevrolet	5
7	19	Martin Truex Jr.	Joe Gibbs Racing	Toyota	4
8	34	Michael McDowell	Front Row Motorsports	Ford	3
9	20	Christopher Bell	Joe Gibbs Racing	Toyota	2
10	4	Kevin Harvick	Stewart-Haas Racing	Ford	1
Official stage two results

=== Final Stage results ===
Stage Three Laps: 55

Pos	Grid	No	Driver	Team	Manufacturer	Laps	Points
1	8	19	Martin Truex Jr.	Joe Gibbs Racing	Toyota	110	53
2	12	8	Kyle Busch	Richard Childress Racing	Chevrolet	110	45
3	17	22	Joey Logano	Team Penske	Ford	110	43
4	7	17	Chris Buescher	RFK Racing	Ford	110	37
5	10	9	Chase Elliott	Hendrick Motorsports	Chevrolet	110	32
6	5	16	A. J. Allmendinger	Kaulig Racing	Chevrolet	110	38
7	3	34	Michael McDowell	Front Row Motorsports	Ford	110	37
8	16	5	Kyle Larson	Hendrick Motorsports	Chevrolet	110	29
9	4	20	Christopher Bell	Joe Gibbs Racing	Toyota	110	39
10	15	1	Ross Chastain	Trackhouse Racing	Chevrolet	110	36
11	21	4	Kevin Harvick	Stewart-Haas Racing	Ford	110	28
12	13	47	Ricky Stenhouse Jr.	JTG Daugherty Racing	Chevrolet	110	32
13	22	41	Ryan Preece	Stewart-Haas Racing	Ford	110	24
14	26	24	William Byron	Hendrick Motorsports	Chevrolet	110	30
15	14	48	Alex Bowman	Hendrick Motorsports	Chevrolet	110	24
16	25	6	Brad Keselowski	RFK Racing	Ford	110	21
17	18	23	Bubba Wallace	23XI Racing	Toyota	110	20
18	6	54	Ty Gibbs (R)	Joe Gibbs Racing	Toyota	110	22
19	11	3	Austin Dillon	Richard Childress Racing	Chevrolet	110	23
20	19	7	Corey LaJoie	Spire Motorsports	Chevrolet	110	17
21	23	31	Justin Haley	Kaulig Racing	Chevrolet	110	16
22	9	99	Daniel Suárez	Trackhouse Racing	Chevrolet	110	15
23	27	77	Ty Dillon	Spire Motorsports	Chevrolet	110	14
24	32	51	Todd Gilliland	Rick Ware Racing	Ford	110	13
25	34	2	Austin Cindric	Team Penske	Ford	110	12
26	35	42	Grant Enfinger (i)	Legacy Motor Club	Chevrolet	110	0
27	36	21	Harrison Burton	Wood Brothers Racing	Ford	110	10
28	20	10	Aric Almirola	Stewart-Haas Racing	Ford	110	9
29	24	14	Chase Briscoe	Stewart-Haas Racing	Ford	110	8
30	29	78	Josh Bilicki (i)	Live Fast Motorsports	Chevrolet	110	0
31	31	12	Ryan Blaney	Team Penske	Ford	110	6
32	28	43	Erik Jones	Legacy Motor Club	Chevrolet	109	5
33	2	45	Tyler Reddick	23XI Racing	Toyota	109	9
34	30	38	Zane Smith (i)	Front Row Motorsports	Ford	109	0
35	33	15	Andy Lally	Rick Ware Racing	Ford	109	2
36	1	11	Denny Hamlin	Joe Gibbs Racing	Toyota	92	11
Official race results

=== Race statistics ===
- Lead changes: 10 among 6 different drivers
- Cautions/Laps: 2 for 6 laps
- Red flags: 0
- Time of race: 2 hours, 40 minutes, and 12 seconds
- Average speed: 81.989 miles per hour (131.949 km/h)

== Media ==
=== Television ===
Fox NASCAR televised the race in the United States on Fox for the seventh year and the first since 2006. Mike Joy was the lap-by-lap announcer, while 2012 Sonoma winner Clint Bowyer and Jamie McMurray were the color commentators. Jamie Little and Regan Smith handled the pit road for the television side. Larry McReynolds provided insight from the Fox Sports studio in Charlotte. This was Fox Sports' last Cup race for their portion of the 2023 season as NBC Sports and USA Network takes over NASCAR broadcasts for the rest of the season.

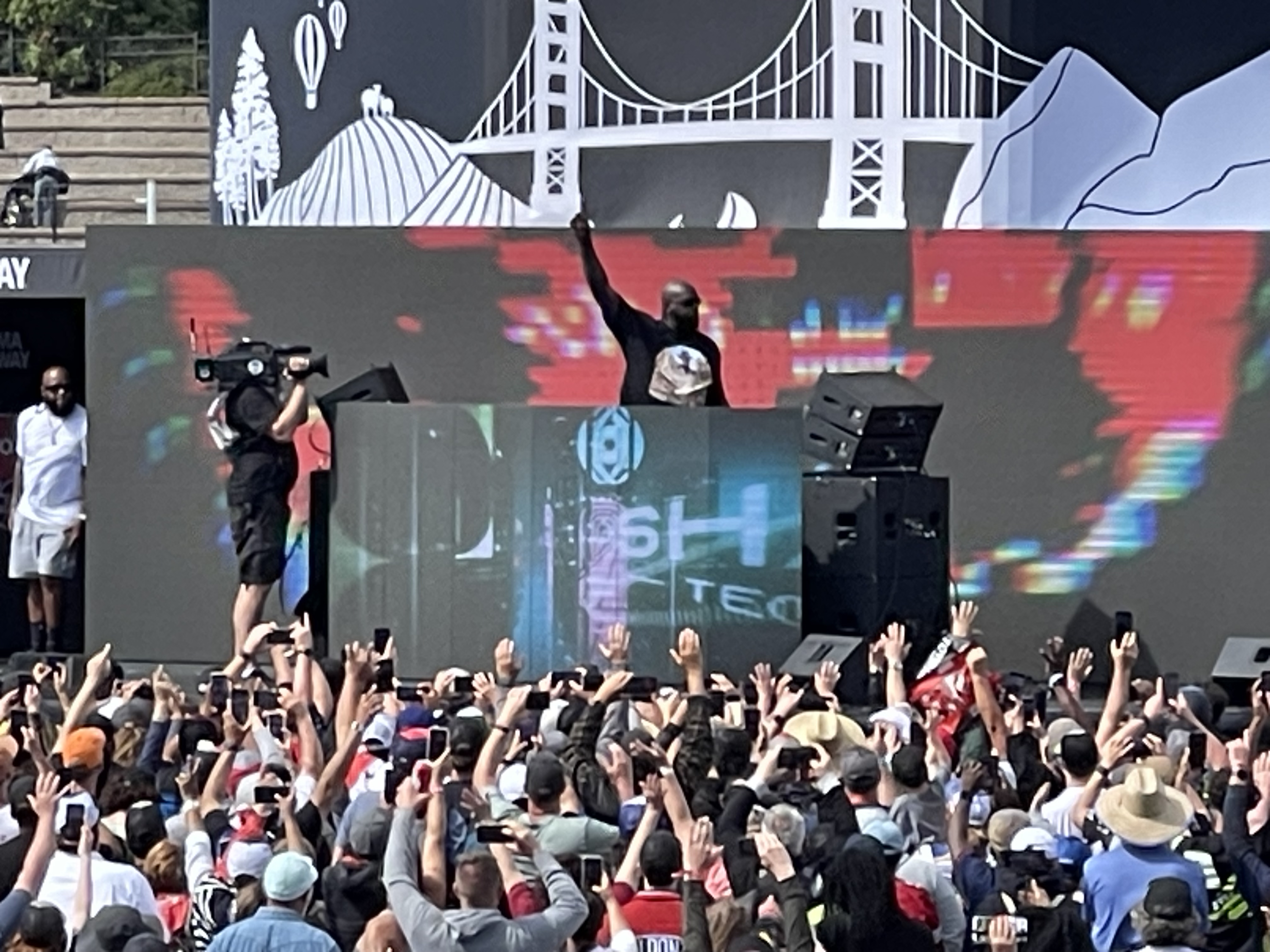
DJ Diesel (Shaquille O'Neal) performing after the race.

Fox
Booth announcers	Pit reporters	In-race analyst
Lap-by-lap: Mike Joy; Color-commentator: Clint Bowyer; Color-commentator: Jamie McMurray	Jamie Little; Regan Smith	Larry McReynolds

=== Radio ===
Radio coverage of the race was broadcast by the Performance Racing Network. PRN's broadcast of the race was also simulcasted on Sirius XM NASCAR Radio. Doug Rice and Mark Garrow announced the race in the booth while the field was racing on the pit straightaway. Pat Patterson called the race from a stand outside of turn 2 when the field was racing up turns 2, 3 and 3a. Doug Turnbull called the race from a stand outside of turn 7a when the field was racing through turns 4a and 7a. Brad Gillie called the race when the field raced thru turns 8 and 9. Rob Albright called the race from a billboard outside turn 11 when the field was racing through turns 10 and 11. Heather DeBeaux, Alan Cavanna, Brett McMillan and Wendy Venturini reported from pit lane during the race.

PRN
Booth announcers	Turn announcers	Pit reporters
Lead announcer: Doug Rice; Announcer: Mark Garrow	Turns 2, 3 & 3a: Pat Patterson; Turns 4a & 7a: Doug Turnbull; Turns 8 & 9: Brad Gillie; Turns 10 & 11: Rob Albright	Heather DeBeaux; Alan Cavanna; Brett McMillan; Wendy Venturini

== Standings after the race ==
Drivers' Championship standings

	Pos	Driver	Points
3	1	Martin Truex Jr.	525
	2	William Byron	512 (–13)
2	3	Ryan Blaney	501 (–24)
1	4	Ross Chastain	501 (–24)
2	5	Kevin Harvick	500 (–25)
1	6	Kyle Busch	496 (–29)
1	7	Christopher Bell	493 (–32)
	8	Denny Hamlin	462 (–63)
3	9	Joey Logano	444 (–81)
1	10	Kyle Larson	440 (–85)
2	11	Chris Buescher	430 (–95)
1	12	Brad Keselowski	424 (–101)
3	13	Tyler Reddick	420 (–105)
	14	Ricky Stenhouse Jr.	400 (–125)
	15	Bubba Wallace	354 (–171)
1	16	Alex Bowman	331 (–194)
Official driver's standings

Manufacturers' Championship standings

Pos	Manufacturer	Points
1	Chevrolet	602
2	Toyota	563 (–39)
3	Ford	546 (–56)

- Note: Only the first 16 positions are included for the driver standings.
- . – Driver has clinched a position in the NASCAR Cup Series playoffs.

Previous race: 2023 Enjoy Illinois 300	NASCAR Cup Series; 2023 season	Next race: 2023 Ally 400
