= 2023 Grant Park 220 =

NASCAR Cup Series race

Race details
- Race 18 of 36 in the 2023 NASCAR Cup Series
- Date: July 2, 2023
- Location: Chicago Street Course in Chicago, Illinois
- Course: Temporary street course
- Course length: 2.2 miles (3.5 km)
- Distance: 78 laps, 171.6 mi (276.163 km)
- Scheduled distance: 100 laps, 220 mi (354.056 km)
- Average speed: 60.281 miles per hour (97.013 km/h)

Pole position
Driver	Denny Hamlin	Joe Gibbs Racing
- Time: 1:28.435

Most laps led
Driver	Christopher Bell	Joe Gibbs Racing
- Laps: 37

Winner
No. 91	Shane van Gisbergen	Trackhouse Racing

Television in the United States
- Network: NBC
- Announcers: Rick Allen, Steve Letarte (booth), Mike Bagley (Turns 1 & 6), Dale Earnhardt Jr. (Turn 4) and Jeff Burton (Turn 11)
- Nielsen ratings: 2.52 (4.795 Million Viewers)

Radio in the United States
- Radio: MRN
- Booth announcers: Alex Hayden and Jeff Striegle
- Turn announcers: Dave Moody (Turns 1 & 6) and Kurt Becker (Turns 2–5)

The 2023 Grant Park 220 was a NASCAR Cup Series race held on July 2, 2023, at the Chicago Street Course in Chicago, Illinois. Originally scheduled for 100 laps, the race was shortened to originally 75 laps due to darkness before being extended to 78 laps due to an overtime finish on the 2.2-mile (3.5 km) street course. It was the 18th race of the 2023 NASCAR Cup Series season. It was the first street race contested for the series. The race was won by reigning Supercars champion Shane van Gisbergen, making his NASCAR debut.

== Report ==
=== Background ===
The Chicago Street Course is a 2.2 mi (3.5 km) street circuit located in the city of Chicago, Illinois, United States. It hosts the NASCAR Cup Series and NASCAR Xfinity Series. The track was initially a conceptual track on iRacing made for the eNASCAR iRacing Pro Invitational Series in 2021.

The track for the actual race in 2023 ended up being the exact same layout as the version used in 2021 for the eNASCAR iRacing Pro Invitational Series. The start/finish line is located on South Columbus Drive in front of Buckingham Fountain in Grant Park. The cars will go south and then turn left onto East Balbo Drive and then right onto South Lake Shore Drive (also part of U.S. Route 41), which is alongside Lake Michigan. The cars will then turn right onto East Roosevelt Road and then make another right, which gets them back onto South Columbus Drive where they are going north. They will then reach the intersection of South Columbus Drive and East Balbo Drive again and will make a left turn. When they are back on East Balbo Drive, they will cross a bridge over the Metra Electric District tracks. Next, the cars will turn right onto South Michigan Avenue and go north, go onto East Congress Plaza Drive and back onto South Michigan Ave. Lastly, they will make a right turn onto East Jackson Drive, go back across the Metra Electric tracks, and right back onto South Columbus Drive to the start/finish line.

==== Entry list ====
- (R) denotes rookie driver.
- (i) denotes the driver ineligible for series driver points.

No.	Driver	Team	Manufacturer
1	Ross Chastain	Trackhouse Racing	Chevrolet
2	Austin Cindric	Team Penske	Ford
3	Austin Dillon	Richard Childress Racing	Chevrolet
4	Kevin Harvick	Stewart-Haas Racing	Ford
5	Kyle Larson	Hendrick Motorsports	Chevrolet
6	Brad Keselowski	RFK Racing	Ford
7	Corey LaJoie	Spire Motorsports	Chevrolet
8	Kyle Busch	Richard Childress Racing	Chevrolet
9	Chase Elliott	Hendrick Motorsports	Chevrolet
10	Aric Almirola	Stewart-Haas Racing	Ford
11	Denny Hamlin	Joe Gibbs Racing	Toyota
12	Ryan Blaney	Team Penske	Ford
14	Chase Briscoe	Stewart-Haas Racing	Ford
15	Jenson Button	Rick Ware Racing	Ford
16	A. J. Allmendinger	Kaulig Racing	Chevrolet
17	Chris Buescher	RFK Racing	Ford
19	Martin Truex Jr.	Joe Gibbs Racing	Toyota
20	Christopher Bell	Joe Gibbs Racing	Toyota
21	Harrison Burton	Wood Brothers Racing	Ford
22	Joey Logano	Team Penske	Ford
23	Bubba Wallace	23XI Racing	Toyota
24	William Byron	Hendrick Motorsports	Chevrolet
31	Justin Haley	Kaulig Racing	Chevrolet
34	Michael McDowell	Front Row Motorsports	Ford
38	Todd Gilliland	Front Row Motorsports	Ford
41	Ryan Preece	Stewart-Haas Racing	Ford
42	Noah Gragson (R)	Legacy Motor Club	Chevrolet
43	Erik Jones	Legacy Motor Club	Chevrolet
45	Tyler Reddick	23XI Racing	Toyota
47	Ricky Stenhouse Jr.	JTG Daugherty Racing	Chevrolet
48	Alex Bowman	Hendrick Motorsports	Chevrolet
51	Andy Lally	Rick Ware Racing	Ford
54	Ty Gibbs (R)	Joe Gibbs Racing	Toyota
77	Ty Dillon	Spire Motorsports	Chevrolet
78	Josh Bilicki (i)	Live Fast Motorsports	Chevrolet
91	Shane van Gisbergen	Trackhouse Racing	Chevrolet
99	Daniel Suárez	Trackhouse Racing	Chevrolet
Official entry list

Note: Jimmie Johnson was due to enter the race in the No. 84 Carvana Chevrolet for Legacy Motor Club, but the team withdrew from the race after his mother-in-law committed a double murder-suicide.

== Practice ==
Shane van Gisbergen was the fastest in the practice session with a time of 1:29.419 and a speed of 88.572 mph (142.543 km/h).

=== Practice results ===
Pos	No.	Driver	Team	Manufacturer	Time	Speed
1	91	Shane van Gisbergen	Trackhouse Racing	Chevrolet	1:29.419	88.572
2	11	Denny Hamlin	Joe Gibbs Racing	Toyota	1:29.732	88.263
3	15	Jenson Button	Rick Ware Racing	Ford	1:29.734	88.261
Official practice results

== Qualifying ==
Denny Hamlin scored the pole for the race with a time of and a 1:28.435 speed of 89.557 mph (144.128 km/h).

=== Qualifying results ===
Pos	No.	Driver	Team	Manufacturer	R1	R2
1	11	Denny Hamlin	Joe Gibbs Racing	Toyota	1:28.369	1:28.435
2	45	Tyler Reddick	23XI Racing	Toyota	1:28.372	1:28.479
3	91	Shane van Gisbergen	Trackhouse Racing	Chevrolet	1:28.509	1:28.588
4	20	Christopher Bell	Joe Gibbs Racing	Toyota	1:28.963	1:29.224
5	99	Daniel Suárez	Trackhouse Racing	Chevrolet	1:28.755	1:29.322
6	34	Michael McDowell	Front Row Motorsports	Ford	1:29.046	1:29.328
7	5	Kyle Larson	Hendrick Motorsports	Chevrolet	1:29.289	1:29.512
8	15	Jenson Button	Rick Ware Racing	Ford	1:29.420	1:29.571
9	22	Joey Logano	Team Penske	Ford	1:29.242	1:30.219
10	16	A. J. Allmendinger	Kaulig Racing	Chevrolet	1:29.488	1:30.283
11	19	Martin Truex Jr.	Joe Gibbs Racing	Toyota	1:29.404	—
12	54	Ty Gibbs (R)	Joe Gibbs Racing	Toyota	1:29.613	—
13	48	Alex Bowman	Hendrick Motorsports	Chevrolet	1:29.617	—
14	23	Bubba Wallace	23XI Racing	Toyota	1:29.667	—
15	17	Chris Buescher	RFK Racing	Ford	1:29.687	—
16	14	Chase Briscoe	Stewart-Haas Racing	Ford	1:29.687	—
17	12	Ryan Blaney	Team Penske	Ford	1:29.756	—
18	8	Kyle Busch	Richard Childress Racing	Chevrolet	1:29.805	—
19	7	Corey LaJoie	Spire Motorsports	Chevrolet	1:29.859	—
20	6	Brad Keselowski	RFK Racing	Ford	1:29.878	—
21	43	Erik Jones	Legacy Motor Club	Chevrolet	1:30.046	—
22	24	William Byron	Hendrick Motorsports	Chevrolet	1:30.169	—
23	42	Noah Gragson (R)	Legacy Motor Club	Chevrolet	1:30.225	—
24	10	Aric Almirola	Stewart-Haas Racing	Ford	1:30.232	—
25	38	Todd Gilliland	Front Row Motorsports	Ford	1:30.235	—
26	9	Chase Elliott	Hendrick Motorsports	Chevrolet	1:30.283	—
27	78	Josh Bilicki (i)	Live Fast Motorsports	Chevrolet	1:30.331	—
28	41	Ryan Preece	Stewart-Haas Racing	Ford	1:30.408	—
29	3	Austin Dillon	Richard Childress Racing	Chevrolet	1:30.521	—
30	51	Andy Lally	Rick Ware Racing	Ford	1:30.575	—
31	2	Austin Cindric	Team Penske	Ford	1:30.718	—
32	21	Harrison Burton	Wood Brothers Racing	Ford	1:30.759	—
33	77	Ty Dillon	Spire Motorsports	Chevrolet	1:30.799	—
34	1	Ross Chastain	Trackhouse Racing	Chevrolet	1:30.856	—
35	4	Kevin Harvick	Stewart-Haas Racing	Ford	1:30.980	—
36	47	Ricky Stenhouse Jr.	JTG Daugherty Racing	Chevrolet	0.000	—
37	31	Justin Haley	Kaulig Racing	Chevrolet	0.000	—
Official qualifying results

== Race ==
=== Report ===
The NASCAR Cup in Chicago started in wet conditions after a delay of over an hour due to rain. Denny Hamlin started in the pole position on the starting grid.

Tyler Reddick made a move on Hamlin in a turn 1 and they were side by side for the next four turns before Reddick took the lead of the race.

Several incidents occurred in the first three laps. In the first lap, Aric Almirola lost control of his car and spun out, causing him to lose positions and struggle to stay in the race. Shortly after, in turn 6, a massive collision involving the two Legacy Motor Club cars and Brad Keselowski occurred. Meanwhile, Hamlin, one of the prominent drivers in the competition, crashed into the wall, slightly damaging his car.

On the other hand, Reddick managed to establish a five-second lead over his competitors in the following three laps. However, the lead faded away when Kyle Busch, who ended up under a tire barrier after losing control of his car in a turn, caused the first yellow flag.

The race restarted on lap 5, but Reddick couldn't pull away from Christopher Bell as before. In fact, on lap 8, Bell overtook him to take the first position.

The second yellow flag was shown on lap 12 after Noah Gragson crashed heavily into the tire barriers in turn 6, with significant damage and smoke coming out of the car.

The first stage ended with Bell winning it and earning 10 points. The top 10 was completed by Reddick, Shane van Gisbergen, Martin Truex Jr., Michael McDowell, Daniel Suárez, Kyle Larson, A. J. Allmendinger, Ty Gibbs, and Jenson Button, who also received stage points. The track started to dry, and Chase Briscoe and Alex Bowman took advantage of lap 21 to enter the pits and put on slick tires, becoming the first ones to do so.

Van Gisbergen surpassed Reddick to take the second position and closed in on the leader Bell, although he was still two seconds behind.

The leaders started making pit stops to switch to slick tires. Bell and Reddick did so on lap 25, and van Gisbergen on lap 26. There were no changes in the top three positions.

Bell led with a 9-second advantage over the second-place driver when Gragson crashed again in turn 6 on lap 30, triggering the third yellow flag.

The race restarted on lap 33, with Bell leading and widening the gap with van Gisbergen, who was also overtaken by Reddick for the second position. Suárez and Larson moved up to fourth and fifth, surpassing Truex. Later, Larson climbed to fourth place by passing Suárez and to third place by overtaking van Gisbergen, who also lost position to Suárez.

Larson continued his progress and on lap 38, he moved into second place by overtaking Reddick. Only Bell remained ahead, leading by over 3 seconds.

Alex Bowman spun out in turn 11 on lap 40, due to contact with Denny Hamlin, causing the fourth yellow flag.

The race restarted on lap 43, with 2 laps remaining in the second stage. Suárez went wide in turn 1, hit the wall, and was overtaken by van Gisbergen, McDowell, and Gibbs. Larson went after Bell for the lead, but Stage 2 ended under yellow with Alex Bowman stopped alongside the track due to engine problems.

The second stage concluded with Bell in first place, followed by Larson, Reddick, van Gisbergen, McDowell, Gibbs, Suárez, Truex Jr., Allmendinger, and Chase Briscoe, who completed the top 10.

Due to the impending sunset and lack of natural light, NASCAR decided to shorten the race from 100 to 75 laps, which would create interesting strategies.

There were massive pit stops on lap 47. Bell came out first, followed by Larson and Reddick. Gibbs gained two positions to place himself in fourth, while van Gisbergen lost three positions and ended up in seventh.

The drivers who made their pit stops earlier occupied the top positions. The top three (Justin Haley, Austin Dillon, and Chase Elliott) made their stops on lap 30 and hoped for yellow flags to make it to the end with enough fuel. The next eight drivers made their stops on lap 41, which allowed them to gain positions relative to the leaders. Among those who stopped on lap 46, the best was Bell, who restarted in 12th position.

The race restarted on lap 49, with Haley maintaining the lead. William Byron went wide in turn 11, and Corey LaJoie hit Kevin Harvick, blocking the track and causing a traffic jam. Interestingly, Byron, Harvick, and LaJoie gave back their positions.

There was a restart on lap 52, with Haley still in the lead. Martin Truex Jr. spun out in turn 5 due to contact with Bubba Wallace but was able to continue, although he lost positions. Meanwhile, Suárez hit the wall and suffered damage to the front left, but remained on the track, losing positions. Gragson crashed into the wall in turn 6 for the fourth time in the race, and Bell spun out and hit the tire barrier in turn 1, losing all chances of making a comeback and winning the race.

Reddick, the best among the drivers who made their pit stop on lap 46, entered the top 5, but with 18 laps remaining, he crashed in turn 6 and couldn't continue, causing the seventh yellow flag.

The race restarted with 15 laps to go, with Austin Dillon pressuring Haley more than in previous restarts, but a lap later, Dillon crashed into the inner wall of turn 12 and then hit the outer wall. He reached the end of the main straight, reversed, and headed to the pits.

Van Gisbergen reached the third position with 10 laps to go, surpassing Kyle Busch, and began reducing the gap to Haley and Elliott, being the fastest driver at that moment. He managed to pass Elliott in turn 2 with 8 laps to go, and a few turns later, he attempted to overtake Haley, but Truex crashed and caused the yellow flag. Van Gisbergen passed him seconds after the yellow flag, so he returned the position to Haley.

There was a restart with 5 laps to go, with Haley leading into the first turn, but in the next turn, van Gisbergen overtook him and took the lead. Haley tried to pass him in turn 3, but van Gisbergen overtook him again in turn 4.

With two laps remaining, Wallace lost control of his car and collided with Ricky Stenhouse Jr. in turn 1, causing the yellow flag. Van Gisbergen expressed concern about his engine, but the team told him that the data was fine. Van Gisbergen acknowledged that he was being paranoid.

An overtime was attempted, and van Gisbergen had a good start and managed his lead to cross the finish line and win for the first time in the category in his debut. Shane van Gisbergen was the second driver in Cup Series history to win in his debut joining Johnny Rutherford who did it in 1963 at Daytona.

=== Race results ===
==== Stage results ====
Stage One Laps: 20

Pos	No	Driver	Team	Manufacturer	Points
1	20	Christopher Bell	Joe Gibbs Racing	Toyota	10
2	45	Tyler Reddick	23XI Racing	Toyota	9
3	91	Shane van Gisbergen	Trackhouse Racing	Chevrolet	8
4	19	Martin Truex Jr.	Joe Gibbs Racing	Toyota	7
5	34	Michael McDowell	Front Row Motorsports	Ford	6
6	99	Daniel Suárez	Trackhouse Racing	Chevrolet	5
7	5	Kyle Larson	Hendrick Motorsports	Chevrolet	4
8	16	A. J. Allmendinger	Kaulig Racing	Chevrolet	3
9	54	Ty Gibbs (R)	Joe Gibbs Racing	Toyota	2
10	15	Jenson Button	Rick Ware Racing	Ford	1
Official stage one results

Stage Two Laps: 25

Pos	No	Driver	Team	Manufacturer	Points
1	20	Christopher Bell	Joe Gibbs Racing	Toyota	10
2	5	Kyle Larson	Hendrick Motorsports	Chevrolet	9
3	45	Tyler Reddick	23XI Racing	Toyota	8
4	91	Shane van Gisbergen	Trackhouse Racing	Chevrolet	7
5	34	Michael McDowell	Front Row Motorsports	Ford	6
6	54	Ty Gibbs (R)	Joe Gibbs Racing	Toyota	5
7	99	Daniel Suárez	Trackhouse Racing	Chevrolet	4
8	19	Martin Truex Jr.	Joe Gibbs Racing	Toyota	3
9	16	A. J. Allmendinger	Kaulig Racing	Chevrolet	2
10	14	Chase Briscoe	Stewart-Haas Racing	Ford	1
Official stage two results

=== Final Stage results ===
Stage Three Laps: 30

Pos	Grid	No	Driver	Team	Manufacturer	Laps	Points
1	3	91	Shane van Gisbergen	Trackhouse Racing	Chevrolet	78	55
2	37	31	Justin Haley	Kaulig Racing	Chevrolet	78	35
3	26	9	Chase Elliott	Hendrick Motorsports	Chevrolet	78	34
4	7	5	Kyle Larson	Hendrick Motorsports	Chevrolet	78	46
5	18	8	Kyle Busch	Richard Childress Racing	Chevrolet	78	32
6	31	2	Austin Cindric	Team Penske	Ford	78	31
7	6	34	Michael McDowell	Front Row Motorsports	Ford	78	42
8	9	22	Joey Logano	Team Penske	Ford	78	29
9	12	54	Ty Gibbs (R)	Joe Gibbs Racing	Toyota	78	35
10	15	17	Chris Buescher	RFK Racing	Ford	78	27
11	1	11	Denny Hamlin	Joe Gibbs Racing	Toyota	78	26
12	24	10	Aric Almirola	Stewart-Haas Racing	Ford	78	25
13	22	24	William Byron	Hendrick Motorsports	Chevrolet	78	24
14	19	7	Corey LaJoie	Spire Motorsports	Chevrolet	78	23
15	28	41	Ryan Preece	Stewart-Haas Racing	Ford	78	22
16	21	43	Erik Jones	Legacy Motor Club	Chevrolet	78	21
17	10	16	A. J. Allmendinger	Kaulig Racing	Chevrolet	78	25
18	4	20	Christopher Bell	Joe Gibbs Racing	Toyota	78	39
19	25	38	Todd Gilliland	Front Row Motorsports	Ford	78	18
20	16	14	Chase Briscoe	Stewart-Haas Racing	Ford	78	18
21	8	15	Jenson Button	Rick Ware Racing	Ford	78	17
22	34	1	Ross Chastain	Trackhouse Racing	Chevrolet	78	15
23	27	78	Josh Bilicki (i)	Live Fast Motorsports	Chevrolet	78	0
24	20	6	Brad Keselowski	RFK Racing	Ford	78	13
25	23	42	Noah Gragson (R)	Legacy Motor Club	Chevrolet	78	12
26	30	51	Andy Lally	Rick Ware Racing	Ford	78	11
27	5	99	Daniel Suárez	Trackhouse Racing	Chevrolet	78	19
28	2	45	Tyler Reddick	23XI Racing	Toyota	78	26
29	35	4	Kevin Harvick	Stewart-Haas Racing	Ford	78	8
30	32	21	Harrison Burton	Wood Brothers Racing	Ford	78	7
31	14	23	Bubba Wallace	23XI Racing	Toyota	78	6
32	11	19	Martin Truex Jr.	Joe Gibbs Racing	Toyota	77	15
33	17	12	Ryan Blaney	Team Penske	Ford	77	4
34	36	47	Ricky Stenhouse Jr.	JTG Daugherty Racing	Chevrolet	77	3
35	33	77	Ty Dillon	Spire Motorsports	Chevrolet	67	2
36	29	3	Austin Dillon	Richard Childress Racing	Chevrolet	62	1
37	13	48	Alex Bowman	Hendrick Motorsports	Chevrolet	40	1
Official race results

=== Race statistics ===
- Lead changes: 7 among 5 different drivers
- Cautions/Laps: 9 for 21 laps
- Red flags: 0
- Time of race: 2 hours, 50 minutes, and 48 seconds
- Average speed: 60.281 miles per hour (97.013 km/h)

== Media ==
=== Television ===
NBC Sports covered the race on the television side, as part of a radio style broadcast for the race. Rick Allen and Steve Letarte called the race from the broadcast booth. MRN broadcaster Mike Bagley called the race from Turns 1 and 6 on South Columbus Drive and East Balbo Drive, Dale Earnhardt Jr. had the call from Turn 4 on DuSable Lake Shore Drive and Roosevelt Road, and Jeff Burton had the call on Turn 11 on South Michigan Avenue and East Jackson Drive. Dave Burns, Kim Coon, Parker Kligerman and Marty Snider handled the pit road duties from pit lane.

NBC
Booth announcers	Turn announcers	Pit reporters
Lap-by-lap: Rick Allen; Color-commentator: Steve Letarte	Turns 1 & 6: Mike Bagley; Turn 4: Dale Earnhardt Jr. Turn 11: Jeff Burton	Dave Burns; Kim Coon; Parker Kligerman; Marty Snider

=== Radio ===
Radio coverage of the race was broadcast by Motor Racing Network (MRN) and was simulcast on Sirius XM NASCAR Radio.

MRN
Booth announcers	Turn announcers	Pit reporters
Lead announcer: Alex Hayden; Announcer: Jeff Striegle	Turns 1 & 6: Dave Moody; Turns 2–5: Kurt Becker	Steve Post; Brienne Pedigo; Chris Wilner

== Standings after the race ==
Drivers' Championship standings

	Pos	Driver	Points
	1	Martin Truex Jr.	591
	2	William Byron	582 (–9)
	3	Ross Chastain	573 (–18)
	4	Christopher Bell	570 (–21)
	5	Kyle Busch	560 (–31)
1	6	Denny Hamlin	538 (–53)
1	7	Kevin Harvick	523 (–68)
1	8	Kyle Larson	521 (–70)
1	9	Ryan Blaney	506 (–85)
	10	Joey Logano	491 (–100)
1	11	Chris Buescher	476 (–115)
1	12	Tyler Reddick	463 (–128)
2	13	Brad Keselowski	463 (–128)
	14	Ricky Stenhouse Jr.	418 (–173)
	15	Bubba Wallace	387 (–204)
2	16	Ty Gibbs	378 (–213)
Official driver's standings

Manufacturers' Championship standings

Pos	Manufacturer	Points
1	Chevrolet	682
2	Toyota	626 (–56)
3	Ford	603 (–79)

- Note: Only the first 16 positions are included for the driver standings.
- . – Driver has clinched a position in the NASCAR Cup Series playoffs.

Previous race: 2023 Ally 400	NASCAR Cup Series; 2023 season	Next race: 2023 Quaker State 400
