= 2023 Ally 400 =

NASCAR Cup Series race

Race details
- Race 17 of 36 in the 2023 NASCAR Cup Series
- Date: June 25, 2023
- Location: Nashville Superspeedway in Lebanon, Tennessee
- Course: Permanent racing facility
- Course length: 1.333 miles (2.145 km)
- Distance: 300 laps, 400 mi (640 km)
- Average speed: 132.914 miles per hour (213.904 km/h)

Pole position
Driver	Ross Chastain	Trackhouse Racing
- Time: 29.797

Most laps led
Driver	Ross Chastain	Trackhouse Racing
- Laps: 99

Winner
No. 1	Ross Chastain	Trackhouse Racing

Television in the United States
- Network: NBC
- Announcers: Rick Allen, Jeff Burton, Steve Letarte, and Dale Earnhardt Jr.

Radio in the United States
- Radio: PRN
- Booth announcers: Doug Rice and Mark Garrow
- Turn announcers: Rob Albright (1–2) and Pat Patterson (3–4)

The 2023 Ally 400 was a NASCAR Cup Series race held on June 25, 2023, at Nashville Superspeedway in Lebanon, Tennessee. Contested over 300 laps on the 1 1/3-mile (2.146 km) superspeedway, it was the 17th race of the 2023 NASCAR Cup Series season.

== Report ==
=== Background ===
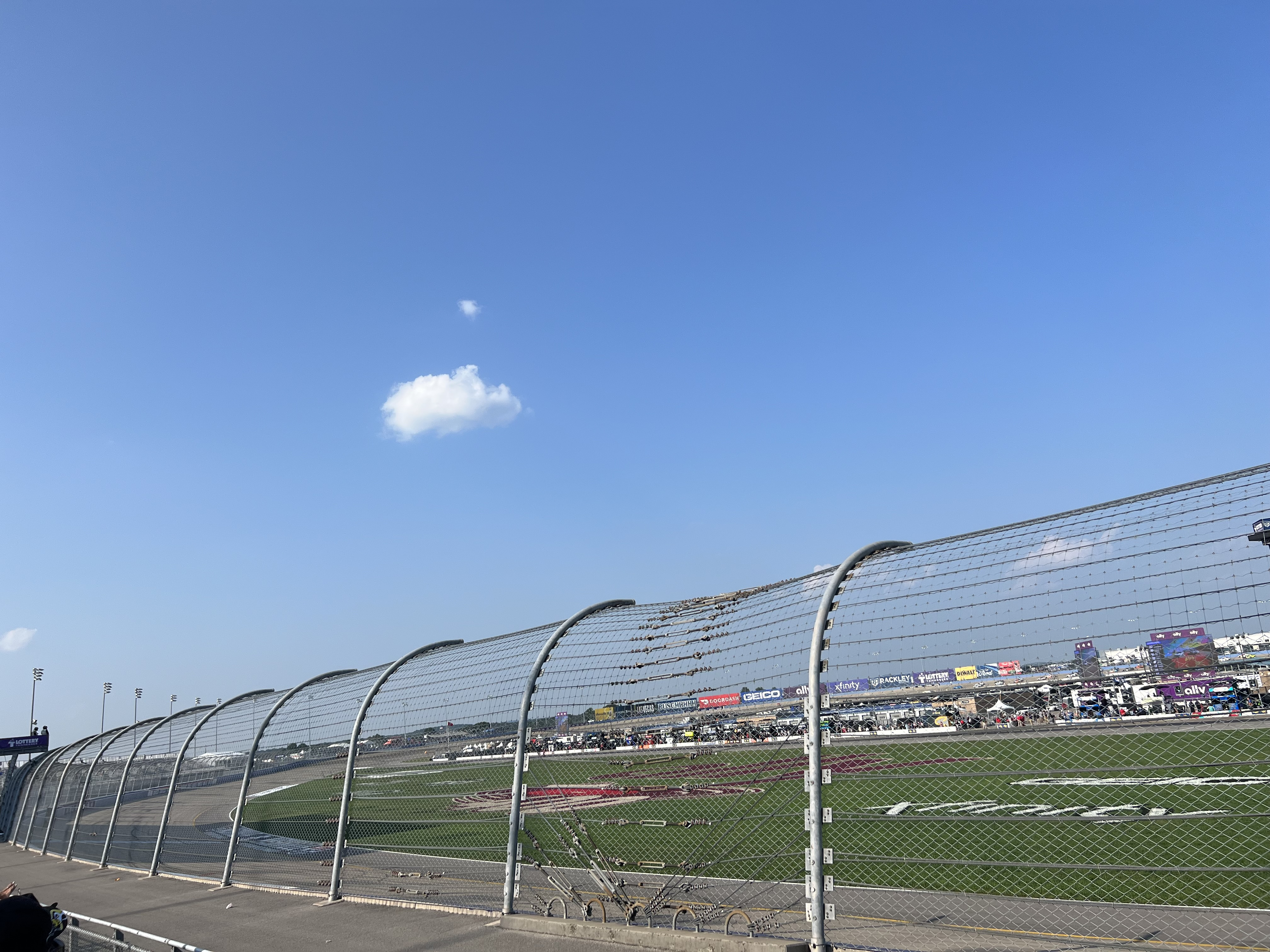
Nashville Superspeedway, where the race was held.

Nashville Superspeedway is a motor racing complex located in Gladeville, Tennessee, United States, about 30 miles (48 km) southeast of Nashville. The track was built in 2001 and is currently used for events, driving schools and GT Academy, a reality television competition.

It is a concrete oval track 1 1/3 miles (2.146 km) long. Nashville Superspeedway is owned by Dover Motorsports, Inc., which also owns Dover International Speedway. Nashville Superspeedway was the longest concrete oval in NASCAR during the time it was on the NASCAR Xfinity Series and NASCAR Craftsman Truck Series circuits. Current permanent seating capacity is approximately 25,000. Additional portable seats are brought in for some events, and seating capacity can be expanded to 150,000. Infrastructure is in place to expand the facility to include a short track, drag strip, and road course.

==== Entry list ====
- (R) denotes rookie driver.
- (i) denotes the driver ineligible for series driver points.

No.	Driver	Team	Manufacturer
1	Ross Chastain	Trackhouse Racing	Chevrolet
2	Austin Cindric	Team Penske	Ford
3	Austin Dillon	Richard Childress Racing	Chevrolet
4	Kevin Harvick	Stewart-Haas Racing	Ford
5	Kyle Larson	Hendrick Motorsports	Chevrolet
6	Brad Keselowski	RFK Racing	Ford
7	Corey LaJoie	Spire Motorsports	Chevrolet
8	Kyle Busch	Richard Childress Racing	Chevrolet
9	Chase Elliott	Hendrick Motorsports	Chevrolet
10	Aric Almirola	Stewart-Haas Racing	Ford
11	Denny Hamlin	Joe Gibbs Racing	Toyota
12	Ryan Blaney	Team Penske	Ford
14	Chase Briscoe	Stewart-Haas Racing	Ford
15	Brennan Poole (i)	Rick Ware Racing	Ford
16	A. J. Allmendinger	Kaulig Racing	Chevrolet
17	Chris Buescher	RFK Racing	Ford
19	Martin Truex Jr.	Joe Gibbs Racing	Toyota
20	Christopher Bell	Joe Gibbs Racing	Toyota
21	Harrison Burton	Wood Brothers Racing	Ford
22	Joey Logano	Team Penske	Ford
23	Bubba Wallace	23XI Racing	Toyota
24	William Byron	Hendrick Motorsports	Chevrolet
31	Justin Haley	Kaulig Racing	Chevrolet
34	Michael McDowell	Front Row Motorsports	Ford
38	Todd Gilliland	Front Row Motorsports	Ford
41	Ryan Preece	Stewart-Haas Racing	Ford
42	Noah Gragson (R)	Legacy Motor Club	Chevrolet
43	Erik Jones	Legacy Motor Club	Chevrolet
45	Tyler Reddick	23XI Racing	Toyota
47	Ricky Stenhouse Jr.	JTG Daugherty Racing	Chevrolet
48	Alex Bowman	Hendrick Motorsports	Chevrolet
51	J. J. Yeley (i)	Rick Ware Racing	Ford
54	Ty Gibbs (R)	Joe Gibbs Racing	Toyota
77	Ty Dillon	Spire Motorsports	Chevrolet
78	Josh Bilicki (i)	Live Fast Motorsports	Chevrolet
99	Daniel Suárez	Trackhouse Racing	Chevrolet
Official entry list

== Practice ==
Tyler Reddick was the fastest in the practice session with a time of 29.510 seconds and a speed of 162.250 mph (261.116 km/h).

=== Practice results ===
Pos	No.	Driver	Team	Manufacturer	Time	Speed
1	45	Tyler Reddick	23XI Racing	Toyota	29.510	162.250
2	19	Martin Truex Jr.	Joe Gibbs Racing	Toyota	29.664	161.408
3	1	Ross Chastain	Trackhouse Racing	Chevrolet	29.671	161.370
Official practice results

== Qualifying ==
Ross Chastain scored the pole for the race with a time of 29.797 and a speed of 160.687 mph (258.601 km/h).

=== Qualifying results ===
Pos	No.	Driver	Team	Manufacturer	R1	R2
1	1	Ross Chastain	Trackhouse Racing	Chevrolet	29.804	29.797
2	45	Tyler Reddick	23XI Racing	Toyota	29.820	30.005
3	31	Justin Haley	Kaulig Racing	Chevrolet	29.918	30.008
4	22	Joey Logano	Team Penske	Ford	29.897	30.016
5	24	William Byron	Hendrick Motorsports	Chevrolet	29.824	30.038
6	19	Martin Truex Jr.	Joe Gibbs Racing	Toyota	29.856	30.039
7	5	Kyle Larson	Hendrick Motorsports	Chevrolet	29.940	30.051
8	11	Denny Hamlin	Joe Gibbs Racing	Toyota	29.891	30.315
9	23	Bubba Wallace	23XI Racing	Toyota	29.796	37.269
10	99	Daniel Suárez	Trackhouse Racing	Chevrolet	29.775	0.000
11	8	Kyle Busch	Richard Childress Racing	Chevrolet	29.943	—
12	17	Chris Buescher	RFK Racing	Ford	29.945	—
13	12	Ryan Blaney	Team Penske	Ford	29.965	—
14	9	Chase Elliott	Hendrick Motorsports	Chevrolet	29.993	—
15	48	Alex Bowman	Hendrick Motorsports	Chevrolet	29.995	—
16	54	Ty Gibbs (R)	Joe Gibbs Racing	Toyota	30.020	—
17	4	Kevin Harvick	Stewart-Haas Racing	Ford	30.027	—
18	14	Chase Briscoe	Stewart-Haas Racing	Ford	30.030	—
19	16	A. J. Allmendinger	Kaulig Racing	Chevrolet	30.042	—
20	6	Brad Keselowski	RFK Racing	Ford	30.060	—
21	10	Aric Almirola	Stewart-Haas Racing	Ford	30.096	—
22	20	Christopher Bell	Joe Gibbs Racing	Toyota	30.130	—
23	43	Erik Jones	Legacy Motor Club	Chevrolet	30.148	—
24	2	Austin Cindric	Team Penske	Ford	30.156	—
25	41	Ryan Preece	Stewart-Haas Racing	Ford	30.165	—
26	3	Austin Dillon	Richard Childress Racing	Chevrolet	30.182	—
27	38	Todd Gilliland	Front Row Motorsports	Ford	30.257	—
28	47	Ricky Stenhouse Jr.	JTG Daugherty Racing	Chevrolet	30.275	—
29	51	J. J. Yeley (i)	Rick Ware Racing	Ford	30.397	—
30	42	Noah Gragson (R)	Legacy Motor Club	Chevrolet	30.480	—
31	21	Harrison Burton	Wood Brothers Racing	Ford	30.512	—
32	15	Brennan Poole (i)	Rick Ware Racing	Ford	30.544	—
33	34	Michael McDowell	Front Row Motorsports	Ford	30.695	—
34	77	Ty Dillon	Spire Motorsports	Chevrolet	30.728	—
35	78	Josh Bilicki (i)	Live Fast Motorsports	Chevrolet	31.390	—
36	7	Corey LaJoie	Spire Motorsports	Chevrolet	0.000	—
Official qualifying results

== Race ==
=== Race results ===
==== Stage results ====
Stage One Laps: 90

Pos	No	Driver	Team	Manufacturer	Points
1	45	Tyler Reddick	23XI Racing	Toyota	10
2	1	Ross Chastain	Trackhouse Racing	Chevrolet	9
3	24	William Byron	Hendrick Motorsports	Chevrolet	8
4	19	Martin Truex Jr.	Joe Gibbs Racing	Toyota	7
5	11	Denny Hamlin	Joe Gibbs Racing	Toyota	6
6	9	Chase Elliott	Hendrick Motorsports	Chevrolet	5
7	8	Kyle Busch	Richard Childress Racing	Chevrolet	4
8	5	Kyle Larson	Hendrick Motorsports	Chevrolet	3
9	20	Christopher Bell	Joe Gibbs Racing	Toyota	2
10	16	A. J. Allmendinger	Kaulig Racing	Chevrolet	1
Official stage one results

Stage Two Laps: 95

Pos	No	Driver	Team	Manufacturer	Points
1	11	Denny Hamlin	Joe Gibbs Racing	Toyota	10
2	19	Martin Truex Jr.	Joe Gibbs Racing	Toyota	9
3	1	Ross Chastain	Trackhouse Racing	Chevrolet	8
4	24	William Byron	Hendrick Motorsports	Chevrolet	7
5	20	Christopher Bell	Joe Gibbs Racing	Toyota	6
6	23	Bubba Wallace	23XI Racing	Toyota	5
7	9	Chase Elliott	Hendrick Motorsports	Chevrolet	4
8	16	A. J. Allmendinger	Kaulig Racing	Chevrolet	3
9	4	Kevin Harvick	Stewart-Haas Racing	Ford	2
10	43	Erik Jones	Legacy Motor Club	Chevrolet	1
Official stage two results

=== Final Stage results ===
Stage Three Laps: 115

Pos	Grid	No	Driver	Team	Manufacturer	Laps	Points
1	1	1	Ross Chastain	Trackhouse Racing	Chevrolet	300	57
2	6	19	Martin Truex Jr.	Joe Gibbs Racing	Toyota	300	51
3	8	11	Denny Hamlin	Joe Gibbs Racing	Toyota	300	50
4	14	9	Chase Elliott	Hendrick Motorsports	Chevrolet	300	42
5	7	5	Kyle Larson	Hendrick Motorsports	Chevrolet	300	35
6	5	24	William Byron	Hendrick Motorsports	Chevrolet	300	46
7	22	20	Christopher Bell	Joe Gibbs Racing	Toyota	300	38
8	23	43	Erik Jones	Legacy Motor Club	Chevrolet	300	30
9	11	8	Kyle Busch	Richard Childress Racing	Chevrolet	300	32
10	19	16	A. J. Allmendinger	Kaulig Racing	Chevrolet	300	31
11	20	6	Brad Keselowski	RFK Racing	Ford	300	26
12	10	99	Daniel Suárez	Trackhouse Racing	Chevrolet	300	25
13	26	3	Austin Dillon	Richard Childress Racing	Chevrolet	300	24
14	16	54	Ty Gibbs (R)	Joe Gibbs Racing	Toyota	300	23
15	9	23	Bubba Wallace	23XI Racing	Toyota	300	27
16	25	41	Ryan Preece	Stewart-Haas Racing	Ford	300	21
17	15	48	Alex Bowman	Hendrick Motorsports	Chevrolet	300	20
18	12	17	Chris Buescher	RFK Racing	Ford	300	19
19	4	22	Joey Logano	Team Penske	Ford	300	18
20	36	7	Corey LaJoie	Spire Motorsports	Chevrolet	300	17
21	31	21	Harrison Burton	Wood Brothers Racing	Ford	300	16
22	28	47	Ricky Stenhouse Jr.	JTG Daugherty Racing	Chevrolet	299	15
23	3	31	Justin Haley	Kaulig Racing	Chevrolet	299	14
24	17	4	Kevin Harvick	Stewart-Haas Racing	Ford	299	15
25	21	10	Aric Almirola	Stewart-Haas Racing	Ford	299	12
26	30	42	Noah Gragson (R)	Legacy Motor Club	Chevrolet	299	11
27	24	2	Austin Cindric	Team Penske	Ford	299	10
28	33	34	Michael McDowell	Front Row Motorsports	Ford	299	9
29	29	51	J. J. Yeley (i)	Rick Ware Racing	Ford	298	0
30	2	45	Tyler Reddick	23XI Racing	Toyota	298	17
31	18	14	Chase Briscoe	Stewart-Haas Racing	Ford	298	6
32	34	77	Ty Dillon	Spire Motorsports	Chevrolet	298	5
33	32	15	Brennan Poole (i)	Rick Ware Racing	Ford	297	0
34	35	78	Josh Bilicki (i)	Live Fast Motorsports	Chevrolet	297	0
35	27	38	Todd Gilliland	Front Row Motorsports	Ford	296	2
36	13	12	Ryan Blaney	Team Penske	Ford	146	1
Official race results

=== Race statistics ===
- Lead changes: 21 among 12 different drivers
- Cautions/Laps: 4 for 24 laps
- Red flags: 0
- Time of race: 3 hours, 0 minutes, and 7 seconds
- Average speed: 132.914 miles per hour (213.904 km/h)

== Media ==
=== Television ===
NBC Sports covered the race on the television side. Rick Allen, Jeff Burton, Steve Letarte, and Dale Earnhardt Jr. called the race from the broadcast booth. Dave Burns, Kim Coon and Marty Snider handled the pit road duties from pit lane. Parker Kligerman provided live reports from Chicago during the race.

NBC
Booth announcers	Pit reporters	Specialty reporter
Lap-by-lap: Rick Allen; Color-commentator: Jeff Burton; Color-commentator: Steve Letarte; Color-commentator: Dale Earnhardt Jr.	Dave Burns; Kim Coon; Marty Snider	Parker Kligerman

=== Radio ===
Radio coverage of the race was broadcast by the Performance Racing Network (PRN), and was also simulcasted on Sirius XM NASCAR Radio. This was the first Nashville race covered by PRN Radio, as radio rights shifted from Motor Racing Network after the 2022 season.

PRN
Booth announcers	Turn announcers	Pit reporters
Lead announcer: Doug Rice; Announcer: Mark Garrow	Turns 1 & 2: Rob Albright; Turns 3 & 4: Pat Patterson	Brad Gillie; Brett McMillan; Wendy Venturini

== Standings after the race ==
Drivers' Championship standings

	Pos	Driver	Points
	1	Martin Truex Jr.	576
	2	William Byron	558 (–18)
1	3	Ross Chastain	558 (–18)
3	4	Christopher Bell	531 (–45)
1	5	Kyle Busch	528 (–48)
1	6	Kevin Harvick	515 (–61)
1	7	Denny Hamlin	512 (–64)
5	8	Ryan Blaney	502 (–74)
1	9	Kyle Larson	475 (–101)
1	10	Joey Logano	462 (–114)
1	11	Brad Keselowski	450 (–126)
1	12	Chris Buescher	449 (–127)
	13	Tyler Reddick	437 (–139)
	14	Ricky Stenhouse Jr.	415 (–161)
	15	Bubba Wallace	381 (–195)
1	16	Daniel Suárez	353 (–223)
Official driver's standings

Manufacturers' Championship standings

Pos	Manufacturer	Points
1	Chevrolet	642
2	Toyota	598 (–44)
3	Ford	572 (–70)

- Note: Only the first 16 positions are included for the driver standings.
- . – Driver has clinched a position in the NASCAR Cup Series playoffs.

Previous race: 2023 Toyota/Save Mart 350	NASCAR Cup Series; 2023 season	Next race: 2023 Grant Park 220
