= 2023 Enjoy Illinois 300 =

NASCAR Cup Series race

2023 Enjoy Illinois 300 presented by TicketSmarter
Race details
- Race 15 of 36 in the 2023 NASCAR Cup Series
- Date: June 4, 2023
- Location: World Wide Technology Raceway in Madison, Illinois
- Course: Permanent racing facility
- Course length: 1.25 miles (2.01 km)
- Distance: 243 laps, 303.75 mi (486 km)
- Scheduled distance: 240 laps, 300 mi (480 km)
- Average speed: 87.508 miles per hour (140.830 km/h)

Pole position
Driver	Kyle Busch	Richard Childress Racing
- Time: 32.802

Most laps led
Driver	Kyle Busch	Richard Childress Racing
- Laps: 121

Winner
No. 8	Kyle Busch	Richard Childress Racing

Television in the United States
- Network: FS1
- Announcers: Mike Joy, Clint Bowyer, Michael Waltrip, and Kenny Wallace (Stage 2)

Radio in the United States
- Radio: MRN
- Booth announcers: Alex Hayden, Jeff Striegle and Rusty Wallace
- Turn announcers: Dave Moody (1 & 2) and Kurt Becker (3 & 4)

The 2023 Enjoy Illinois 300 presented by TicketSmarter was a NASCAR Cup Series race held on June 4, 2023, at World Wide Technology Raceway in Madison, Illinois. Contested over 243 laps – extended from 240 laps due to an overtime finish, on the 1.25-mile (2.01 km) paved oval motor racing track, it was the 15th race of the 2023 NASCAR Cup Series season. This would be the final Cup Series victory for two-time series champion Kyle Busch, before his sudden death on May 21, 2026, due to illness.

== Report ==
=== Background ===
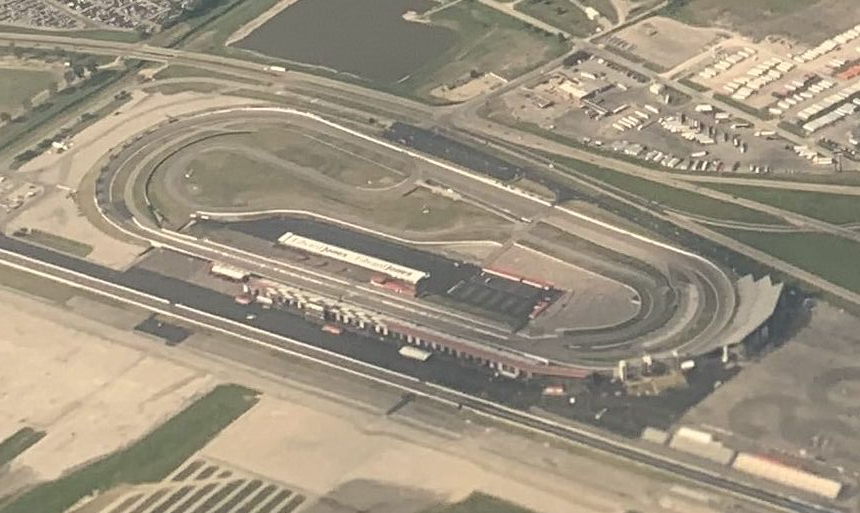
World Wide Technology Raceway, the track where the race was held.

World Wide Technology Raceway (formerly Gateway International Raceway and Gateway Motorsports Park) is a motorsport racing facility in Madison, Illinois, just east of St. Louis, Missouri, United States, close to the Gateway Arch. It features a 1.25-mile (2 kilometer) oval that hosts the NASCAR Cup Series, NASCAR Craftsman Truck Series, and the NTT IndyCar Series, a 1.6-mile (2.6 km) infield road course used by the SCCA, Porsche Club of America, and various car clubs, and a quarter-mile drag strip that hosts the annual NHRA Midwest Nationals event.

Corey LaJoie replaced Chase Elliott for the race, who was parked by NASCAR for a deliberate collision against Denny Hamlin the race prior; Carson Hocevar took over LaJoie's No. 7 car as a result.

==== Entry list ====
- (R) denotes rookie driver.
- (i) denotes the driver ineligible for series driver points.

No.	Driver	Team	Manufacturer
1	Ross Chastain	Trackhouse Racing	Chevrolet
2	Austin Cindric	Team Penske	Ford
3	Austin Dillon	Richard Childress Racing	Chevrolet
4	Kevin Harvick	Stewart-Haas Racing	Ford
5	Kyle Larson	Hendrick Motorsports	Chevrolet
6	Brad Keselowski	RFK Racing	Ford
7	Carson Hocevar (i)	Spire Motorsports	Chevrolet
8	Kyle Busch	Richard Childress Racing	Chevrolet
9	Corey LaJoie	Hendrick Motorsports	Chevrolet
10	Aric Almirola	Stewart-Haas Racing	Ford
11	Denny Hamlin	Joe Gibbs Racing	Toyota
12	Ryan Blaney	Team Penske	Ford
14	Chase Briscoe	Stewart-Haas Racing	Ford
15	Gray Gaulding (i)	Rick Ware Racing	Ford
16	A. J. Allmendinger	Kaulig Racing	Chevrolet
17	Chris Buescher	RFK Racing	Ford
19	Martin Truex Jr.	Joe Gibbs Racing	Toyota
20	Christopher Bell	Joe Gibbs Racing	Toyota
21	Harrison Burton	Wood Brothers Racing	Ford
22	Joey Logano	Team Penske	Ford
23	Bubba Wallace	23XI Racing	Toyota
24	William Byron	Hendrick Motorsports	Chevrolet
31	Justin Haley	Kaulig Racing	Chevrolet
34	Michael McDowell	Front Row Motorsports	Ford
38	Todd Gilliland	Front Row Motorsports	Ford
41	Ryan Preece	Stewart-Haas Racing	Ford
42	Noah Gragson (R)	Legacy Motor Club	Chevrolet
43	Erik Jones	Legacy Motor Club	Chevrolet
45	Tyler Reddick	23XI Racing	Toyota
47	Ricky Stenhouse Jr.	JTG Daugherty Racing	Chevrolet
48	Alex Bowman	Hendrick Motorsports	Chevrolet
51	J. J. Yeley (i)	Rick Ware Racing	Ford
54	Ty Gibbs (R)	Joe Gibbs Racing	Toyota
77	Ty Dillon	Spire Motorsports	Chevrolet
78	B. J. McLeod	Live Fast Motorsports	Chevrolet
99	Daniel Suárez	Trackhouse Racing	Chevrolet
Official entry list

== Practice ==
Joey Logano was the fastest in the practice session with a time of 32.881 seconds and a speed of 136.857 mph (220.250 km/h).

=== Practice results ===
Pos	No.	Driver	Team	Manufacturer	Time	Speed
1	22	Joey Logano	Team Penske	Ford	32.881	136.857
2	5	Kyle Larson	Hendrick Motorsports	Chevrolet	32.892	136.811
3	24	William Byron	Hendrick Motorsports	Chevrolet	32.953	136.558
Official practice results

== Qualifying ==
Kyle Busch scored the pole for the race with a time of 32.802 and a speed of 137.187 mph (220.781 km/h).

=== Qualifying results ===
Pos	No.	Driver	Team	Manufacturer	R1	R2
1	8	Kyle Busch	Richard Childress Racing	Chevrolet	33.025	32.802
2	12	Ryan Blaney	Team Penske	Ford	32.797	32.810
3	11	Denny Hamlin	Joe Gibbs Racing	Toyota	32.877	32.870
4	4	Kevin Harvick	Stewart-Haas Racing	Ford	32.872	32.903
5	19	Martin Truex Jr.	Joe Gibbs Racing	Toyota	32.979	33.001
6	22	Joey Logano	Team Penske	Ford	33.074	33.006
7	24	William Byron	Hendrick Motorsports	Chevrolet	32.998	33.030
8	1	Ross Chastain	Trackhouse Racing	Chevrolet	32.847	33.090
9	45	Tyler Reddick	23XI Racing	Toyota	32.880	33.140
10	2	Austin Cindric	Team Penske	Ford	32.919	33.203
11	16	A. J. Allmendinger	Kaulig Racing	Chevrolet	33.008	—
12	47	Ricky Stenhouse Jr.	JTG Daugherty Racing	Chevrolet	33.063	—
13	99	Daniel Suárez	Trackhouse Racing	Chevrolet	33.086	—
14	21	Harrison Burton	Wood Brothers Racing	Ford	33.106	—
15	54	Ty Gibbs (R)	Joe Gibbs Racing	Toyota	33.110	—
16	3	Austin Dillon	Richard Childress Racing	Chevrolet	33.119	—
17	20	Christopher Bell	Joe Gibbs Racing	Toyota	33.148	—
18	48	Alex Bowman	Hendrick Motorsports	Chevrolet	33.149	—
19	6	Brad Keselowski	RFK Racing	Ford	33.151	—
20	23	Bubba Wallace	23XI Racing	Toyota	33.191	—
21	34	Michael McDowell	Front Row Motorsports	Ford	33.194	—
22	5	Kyle Larson	Hendrick Motorsports	Chevrolet	33.209	—
23	31	Justin Haley	Kaulig Racing	Chevrolet	33.218	—
24	10	Aric Almirola	Stewart-Haas Racing	Ford	33.224	—
25	14	Chase Briscoe	Stewart-Haas Racing	Ford	33.277	—
26	7	Carson Hocevar (i)	Spire Motorsports	Chevrolet	33.279	—
27	17	Chris Buescher	RFK Racing	Ford	33.285	—
28	38	Todd Gilliland	Front Row Motorsports	Ford	33.321	—
29	41	Ryan Preece	Stewart-Haas Racing	Ford	33.435	—
30	9	Corey LaJoie	Hendrick Motorsports	Chevrolet	33.442	—
31	43	Erik Jones	Legacy Motor Club	Chevrolet	33.445	—
32	42	Noah Gragson (R)	Legacy Motor Club	Chevrolet	33.639	—
33	77	Ty Dillon	Spire Motorsports	Chevrolet	33.778	—
34	78	B. J. McLeod	Live Fast Motorsports	Chevrolet	33.797	—
35	15	Gray Gaulding (i)	Rick Ware Racing	Ford	33.867	—
36	51	J. J. Yeley (i)	Rick Ware Racing	Ford	34.061	—
Official qualifying results

== Race ==
=== Race results ===
==== Stage results ====
Stage One Laps: 45

Pos	No	Driver	Team	Manufacturer	Points
1	8	Kyle Busch	Richard Childress Racing	Chevrolet	10
2	12	Ryan Blaney	Team Penske	Ford	9
3	11	Denny Hamlin	Joe Gibbs Racing	Toyota	8
4	19	Martin Truex Jr.	Joe Gibbs Racing	Toyota	7
5	22	Joey Logano	Team Penske	Ford	6
6	4	Kevin Harvick	Stewart-Haas Racing	Ford	5
7	24	William Byron	Hendrick Motorsports	Chevrolet	4
8	1	Ross Chastain	Trackhouse Racing	Chevrolet	3
9	2	Austin Cindric	Team Penske	Ford	2
10	99	Daniel Suárez	Trackhouse Racing	Chevrolet	1
Official stage one results

Stage Two Laps: 95

Pos	No	Driver	Team	Manufacturer	Points
1	12	Ryan Blaney	Team Penske	Ford	10
2	8	Kyle Busch	Richard Childress Racing	Chevrolet	9
3	11	Denny Hamlin	Joe Gibbs Racing	Toyota	8
4	24	William Byron	Hendrick Motorsports	Chevrolet	7
5	99	Daniel Suárez	Trackhouse Racing	Chevrolet	6
6	47	Ricky Stenhouse Jr.	JTG Daugherty Racing	Chevrolet	5
7	22	Joey Logano	Team Penske	Ford	4
8	4	Kevin Harvick	Stewart-Haas Racing	Ford	3
9	1	Ross Chastain	Trackhouse Racing	Chevrolet	2
10	5	Kyle Larson	Hendrick Motorsports	Chevrolet	1
Official stage two results

=== Final Stage results ===
Stage Three Laps: 100

Pos	Grid	No	Driver	Team	Manufacturer	Laps	Points
1	1	8	Kyle Busch	Richard Childress Racing	Chevrolet	243	59
2	3	11	Denny Hamlin	Joe Gibbs Racing	Toyota	243	51
3	6	22	Joey Logano	Team Penske	Ford	243	44
4	22	5	Kyle Larson	Hendrick Motorsports	Chevrolet	243	34
5	5	19	Martin Truex Jr.	Joe Gibbs Racing	Toyota	243	39
6	2	12	Ryan Blaney	Team Penske	Ford	243	50
7	13	99	Daniel Suárez	Trackhouse Racing	Chevrolet	243	37
8	7	24	William Byron	Hendrick Motorsports	Chevrolet	243	40
9	21	34	Michael McDowell	Front Row Motorsports	Ford	243	28
10	4	4	Kevin Harvick	Stewart-Haas Racing	Ford	243	35
11	17	20	Christopher Bell	Joe Gibbs Racing	Toyota	243	26
12	27	17	Chris Buescher	RFK Racing	Ford	243	25
13	10	2	Austin Cindric	Team Penske	Ford	243	26
14	11	16	A. J. Allmendinger	Kaulig Racing	Chevrolet	243	23
15	28	38	Todd Gilliland	Front Row Motorsports	Ford	243	22
16	23	31	Justin Haley	Kaulig Racing	Chevrolet	243	21
17	29	41	Ryan Preece	Stewart-Haas Racing	Ford	243	20
18	31	43	Erik Jones	Legacy Motor Club	Chevrolet	243	-41
19	24	10	Aric Almirola	Stewart-Haas Racing	Ford	243	18
20	15	54	Ty Gibbs (R)	Joe Gibbs Racing	Toyota	243	17
21	30	9	Corey LaJoie	Hendrick Motorsports	Chevrolet	243	16
22	8	1	Ross Chastain	Trackhouse Racing	Chevrolet	243	20
23	14	21	Harrison Burton	Wood Brothers Racing	Ford	243	14
24	36	51	J. J. Yeley (i)	Rick Ware Racing	Ford	243	0
25	33	77	Ty Dillon	Spire Motorsports	Chevrolet	243	12
26	18	48	Alex Bowman	Hendrick Motorsports	Chevrolet	243	11
27	34	78	B. J. McLeod	Live Fast Motorsports	Chevrolet	243	10
28	19	6	Brad Keselowski	RFK Racing	Ford	243	9
29	35	15	Gray Gaulding (i)	Rick Ware Racing	Ford	242	0
30	20	23	Bubba Wallace	23XI Racing	Toyota	236	7
31	16	3	Austin Dillon	Richard Childress Racing	Chevrolet	223	6
32	12	47	Ricky Stenhouse Jr.	JTG Daugherty Racing	Chevrolet	219	10
33	32	42	Noah Gragson (R)	Legacy Motor Club	Chevrolet	197	4
34	25	14	Chase Briscoe	Stewart-Haas Racing	Ford	193	3
35	9	45	Tyler Reddick	23XI Racing	Toyota	174	2
36	26	7	Carson Hocevar (i)	Spire Motorsports	Chevrolet	91	0
Official race results

=== Race statistics ===
- Lead changes: 10 among 5 different drivers
- Cautions/Laps: 11 for 67 laps
- Red flags: 3 for 1 hour, 59 minutes, and 5 seconds (1 for a lightning delay, 1 for wreck clean-up, and 1 for repairs to the Turn 1 SAFER Barrier)
- Time of race: 3 hours, 28 minutes, and 16 seconds
- Average speed: 87.508 miles per hour (140.830 km/h)

== Media ==
=== Television ===
Fox Sports covered the race on the television side. Mike Joy, Clint Bowyer and Michael Waltrip called the race from the broadcast booth, with Kenny Wallace joining for Stage 2. Jamie Little and Regan Smith handled the pit road for the television side. Larry McReynolds provided insight from the Fox Sports studio in Charlotte.

FS1
Booth announcers	Pit reporters	In-race analyst
Lap-by-lap: Mike Joy; Color-commentator: Clint Bowyer; Color-commentator: Michael Waltrip; Color-commentator: Kenny Wallace (Stage 2)	Jamie Little; Regan Smith	Larry McReynolds

=== Radio ===
MRN had the radio call for the race and was also simulcasted on Sirius XM NASCAR Radio. Alex Hayden, Jeff Striegle, and Rusty Wallace called the race for MRN from the booth when the field raced down the front straightaway. Dave Moody called the race from turns 1 & 2 while Kurt Becker called the race from turns 3 & 4. Pit Road for MRN was manned by Steve Post, Brienne Pedigo and Kim Coon.

MRN Radio
Booth announcers	Turn announcers	Pit reporters
Lead announcer: Alex Hayden; Announcer: Jeff Striegle; Announcer: Rusty Wallace	Turns 1 & 2: Dave Moody; Turns 3 & 4: Kurt Becker	Steve Post; Brienne Pedigo; Kim Coon

== Standings after the race ==
Drivers' Championship standings

	Pos	Driver	Points
1	1	Ryan Blaney	495
1	2	William Byron	482 (–13)
1	3	Kevin Harvick	473 (–22)
1	4	Martin Truex Jr.	472 (–23)
4	5	Ross Chastain	466 (–29)
	6	Christopher Bell	455 (–40)
3	7	Kyle Busch	451 (–44)
	8	Denny Hamlin	451 (–44)
2	9	Kyle Larson	411 (–84)
3	10	Tyler Reddick	411 (–84)
2	11	Brad Keselowski	403 (–92)
2	12	Joey Logano	401 (–94)
1	13	Chris Buescher	393 (–102)
1	14	Ricky Stenhouse Jr.	368 (–127)
	15	Bubba Wallace	334 (–161)
2	16	Daniel Suárez	313 (–182)
Official driver's standings

Manufacturers' Championship standings

Pos	Manufacturer	Points
1	Chevrolet	567
2	Toyota	523 (–44)
3	Ford	512 (–55)

- Note: Only the first 16 positions are included for the driver standings.
- . – Driver has clinched a position in the NASCAR Cup Series playoffs.

Previous race: 2023 Coca-Cola 600	NASCAR Cup Series; 2023 season	Next race: 2023 Toyota/Save Mart 350
