= Enjoy Illinois 300 =

NASCAR Cup Series race at World Wide Technology Raceway

NASCAR Cup Series
- Venue: World Wide Technology Raceway
- Location: Madison, Illinois
- Corporate sponsor: Illinois Department of Commerce and Economic Opportunity / Illinois Office of Tourism
- First race: 2022
- Distance: 300 miles (480 km)
- Laps: 240; Stage 1: 45; Stage 2: 95; Final Stage: 100
- Most wins (team): Team Penske (2)
- Most wins (manufacturer): Ford; Chevrolet (2)

Circuit information
- Surface: Asphalt
- Length: 1.25 mi (2.01 km)
- Turns: 4

The Enjoy Illinois 300 is a NASCAR Cup Series race at World Wide Technology Raceway in Madison, Illinois in the Greater St. Louis metropolitan area, first held in 2022. Kyle Larson is the defending race winner.

== History ==
On August 21, 2021, Adam Stern from Sports Business Journal reported that NASCAR was in talks to have the track host a Cup Series race in 2022. On September 8, he reported that Gateway would be on the 2022 Cup Series schedule and would replace the Pocono Organics CBD 325, one of the two Cup Series races at Pocono Raceway. Gateway officially awarded a race, with the inaugural running on June 5, 2022.

The race length is 300 miles (240 laps). The stage lengths for the race were confirmed to be 45-95-100 laps for the Cup Series. The 2022 event was the first Cup race at the track, and also the first for the new Next Gen car at the track.

A former NASCAR Craftsman Truck Series race, the Toyota 200, which was previously a standalone race on the series' schedule before the track received a Cup Series date, was held on the same weekend as this race. For 2025, the NASCAR Xfinity Series would have a return to the track for the Nu Way 200 along with the Cup Series event.

== Past winners ==
Year	Date	No.	Driver	Team	Manufacturer	Race distance		Race time	Average speed (mph)	Report	Ref
Year	Date	No.	Driver	Team	Manufacturer	Laps	Miles (km)	Race time	Average speed (mph)	Report	Ref
2022	June 5	22	Joey Logano	Team Penske	Ford	245*	306.25 (490)	3:07:34	97.965	Report	
2023	June 4	8	Kyle Busch	Richard Childress Racing	Chevrolet	243*	303.75 (486)	3:28:16	87.508	Report	
2024	June 2	2	Austin Cindric	Team Penske	Ford	240	300 (480)	2:48:03	107.11	Report	
2025	September 7	11	Denny Hamlin	Joe Gibbs Racing	Toyota	240	300 (480)	3:03:11	98.262	Report	
2026	September 13	5	Kyle Larson	Hendrick Motorsports	Chevrolet	247*	308.75 (494)	3:47:23	81.47	Report	
2027	August 22									Report	

=== Notes ===
- 2022, 2023 & 2026: Races extended due to NASCAR overtime.

=== Multiple winners (teams) ===
# Wins	Team	Years won
2	Team Penske	2022, 2024

=== Manufacturer wins ===
# Wins	Manufacturer	Years won
2	Ford	2022, 2024
2	Chevrolet	2023, 2026
1	Toyota	2025

Previous race: Bass Pro Shops Night Race	NASCAR Cup Series; Enjoy Illinois 300	Next race: Coke Zero Sugar 400
