= 2025 Enjoy Illinois 300 =

Race details
- Race 28 of 36 in the 2025 NASCAR Cup Series
- Date: September 7, 2025
- Location: Gateway Motorsports Park in Madison, Illinois
- Course: Permanent racing facility
- Course length: 1.25 miles (2.01 km)
- Distance: 240 laps, 300 mi (480 km)
- Average speed: 98.262 miles per hour (158.137 km/h)

Pole position
Driver	Denny Hamlin	Joe Gibbs Racing
- Time: 32.330

Most laps led
Driver	Denny Hamlin	Joe Gibbs Racing
- Laps: 75

Fastest lap
Driver	Denny Hamlin	Joe Gibbs Racing
- Time: 32.944

Winner
No. 11	Denny Hamlin	Joe Gibbs Racing

Television in the United States
- Network: USA
- Announcers: Leigh Diffey, Jeff Burton and Steve Letarte

Radio in the United States
- Radio: MRN
- Booth announcers: Alex Hayden, Mike Bagley, and Rusty Wallace
- Turn announcers: Dave Moody (1 & 2) and Kurt Becker (3 & 4)

The 2025 Enjoy Illinois 300 was a NASCAR Cup Series race held on September 7, 2025, at Gateway Motorsports Park in Madison, Illinois on the 1.25-mile (2.01 km) speedway, it was the 28th race of the 2025 NASCAR Cup Series season, and the second race of the playoffs.

Denny Hamlin won the race. Chase Briscoe finished 2nd, and Chase Elliott finished 3rd. Ryan Blaney and Joey Logano rounded out the top five, and John Hunter Nemechek, Christopher Bell, Bubba Wallace, Chris Buescher, and Ty Gibbs rounded out the top ten.

== Report ==
=== Background ===
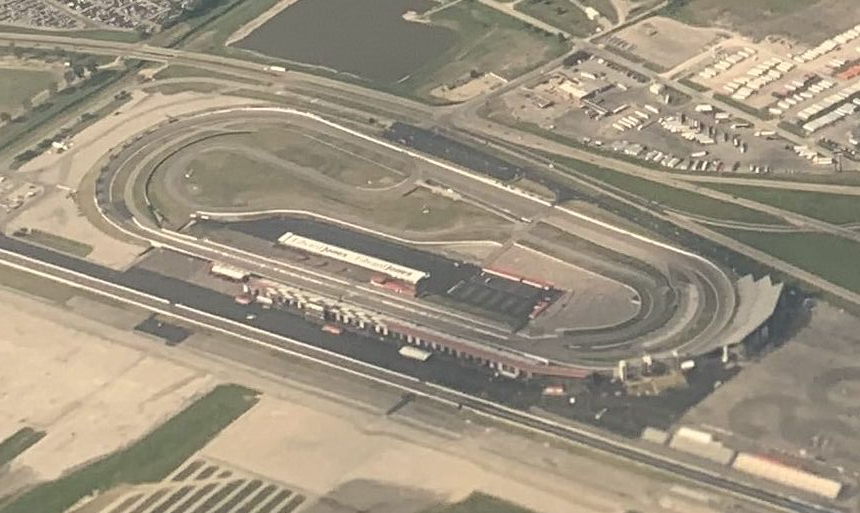
World Wide Technology Raceway, the track where the race was held.

World Wide Technology Raceway (formerly Gateway International Raceway and Gateway Motorsports Park) is a motorsport racing facility in Madison, Illinois, just east of St. Louis, Missouri, United States, close to the Gateway Arch. It features a 1.25-mile (2 kilometer) oval that hosts the NASCAR Cup Series, NASCAR Craftsman Truck Series, and the NTT IndyCar Series, a 1.6-mile (2.6 km) infield road course used by the SCCA, Porsche Club of America, and various car clubs, and a quarter-mile drag strip that hosts the annual NHRA Midwest Nationals event.

==== Entry list ====
- (R) denotes rookie driver.
- (P) denotes playoff driver.
- (i) denotes driver who is ineligible for series driver points.

No.	Driver	Team	Manufacturer
1	Ross Chastain (P)	Trackhouse Racing	Chevrolet
2	Austin Cindric (P)	Team Penske	Ford
3	Austin Dillon (P)	Richard Childress Racing	Chevrolet
4	Noah Gragson	Front Row Motorsports	Ford
5	Kyle Larson (P)	Hendrick Motorsports	Chevrolet
6	Brad Keselowski	RFK Racing	Ford
7	Justin Haley	Spire Motorsports	Chevrolet
8	Kyle Busch	Richard Childress Racing	Chevrolet
9	Chase Elliott (P)	Hendrick Motorsports	Chevrolet
10	Ty Dillon	Kaulig Racing	Chevrolet
11	Denny Hamlin (P)	Joe Gibbs Racing	Toyota
12	Ryan Blaney (P)	Team Penske	Ford
16	A. J. Allmendinger	Kaulig Racing	Chevrolet
17	Chris Buescher	RFK Racing	Ford
19	Chase Briscoe (P)	Joe Gibbs Racing	Toyota
20	Christopher Bell (P)	Joe Gibbs Racing	Toyota
21	Josh Berry (P)	Wood Brothers Racing	Ford
22	Joey Logano (P)	Team Penske	Ford
23	Bubba Wallace (P)	23XI Racing	Toyota
24	William Byron (P)	Hendrick Motorsports	Chevrolet
34	Todd Gilliland	Front Row Motorsports	Ford
35	Riley Herbst (R)	23XI Racing	Toyota
38	Zane Smith	Front Row Motorsports	Ford
41	Cole Custer	Haas Factory Team	Ford
42	John Hunter Nemechek	Legacy Motor Club	Toyota
43	Erik Jones	Legacy Motor Club	Toyota
45	Tyler Reddick (P)	23XI Racing	Toyota
47	Ricky Stenhouse Jr.	Hyak Motorsports	Chevrolet
48	Alex Bowman (P)	Hendrick Motorsports	Chevrolet
51	Cody Ware	Rick Ware Racing	Ford
54	Ty Gibbs	Joe Gibbs Racing	Toyota
60	Ryan Preece	RFK Racing	Ford
71	Michael McDowell	Spire Motorsports	Chevrolet
77	Carson Hocevar	Spire Motorsports	Chevrolet
88	Shane van Gisbergen (P) (R)	Trackhouse Racing	Chevrolet
99	Daniel Suárez	Trackhouse Racing	Chevrolet
Official entry list

== Practice ==
Ty Gibbs was the fastest in the practice session with a time of 32.898 seconds and a speed of 136.786 mph (220.136 km/h).

=== Practice results ===
Pos	No.	Driver	Team	Manufacturer	Time	Speed
1	54	Ty Gibbs	Joe Gibbs Racing	Toyota	32.898	136.786
2	5	Kyle Larson (P)	Hendrick Motorsports	Chevrolet	33.002	136.355
3	6	Brad Keselowski	RFK Racing	Ford	33.066	136.091
Official practice results

== Qualifying ==
Denny Hamlin scored the pole for the race with a time of 32.330 and a speed of 139.190 mph (224.005 km/h).

=== Qualifying results ===
Pos	No.	Driver	Team	Manufacturer	Time	Speed
1	11	Denny Hamlin (P)	Joe Gibbs Racing	Toyota	32.330	139.190
2	5	Kyle Larson (P)	Hendrick Motorsports	Chevrolet	32.351	139.099
3	19	Chase Briscoe (P)	Joe Gibbs Racing	Toyota	32.397	138.902
4	1	Ross Chastain (P)	Trackhouse Racing	Chevrolet	32.408	138.855
5	12	Ryan Blaney (P)	Team Penske	Ford	32.432	138.752
6	24	William Byron (P)	Hendrick Motorsports	Chevrolet	32.467	138.602
7	45	Tyler Reddick (P)	23XI Racing	Toyota	32.501	138.457
8	20	Christopher Bell (P)	Joe Gibbs Racing	Toyota	32.512	138.410
9	2	Austin Cindric (P)	Team Penske	Ford	32.571	138.160
10	38	Zane Smith	Front Row Motorsports	Ford	32.674	137.724
11	17	Chris Buescher	RFK Racing	Ford	32.689	137.661
12	21	Josh Berry (P)	Wood Brothers Racing	Ford	32.698	137.623
13	22	Joey Logano (P)	Team Penske	Ford	32.719	137.535
14	23	Bubba Wallace (P)	23XI Racing	Toyota	32.739	137.451
15	3	Austin Dillon (P)	Richard Childress Racing	Chevrolet	32.757	137.375
16	43	Erik Jones	Legacy Motor Club	Toyota	32.760	137.363
17	16	A. J. Allmendinger	Kaulig Racing	Chevrolet	32.764	137.346
18	88	Shane van Gisbergen (P) (R)	Trackhouse Racing	Chevrolet	32.765	137.342
19	9	Chase Elliott (P)	Hendrick Motorsports	Chevrolet	32.799	137.199
20	42	John Hunter Nemechek	Legacy Motor Club	Toyota	32.852	136.978
21	54	Ty Gibbs	Joe Gibbs Racing	Toyota	32.889	136.824
22	8	Kyle Busch	Richard Childress Racing	Chevrolet	32.952	136.562
23	6	Brad Keselowski	RFK Racing	Ford	32.957	136.542
24	4	Noah Gragson	Front Row Motorsports	Ford	32.993	136.393
25	48	Alex Bowman (P)	Hendrick Motorsports	Chevrolet	33.005	136.343
26	99	Daniel Suárez	Trackhouse Racing	Chevrolet	33.038	136.207
27	77	Carson Hocevar	Spire Motorsports	Chevrolet	33.133	135.816
28	71	Michael McDowell	Spire Motorsports	Chevrolet	33.197	135.554
29	41	Cole Custer	Haas Factory Team	Ford	33.201	135.538
30	34	Todd Gilliland	Front Row Motorsports	Ford	33.230	135.420
31	7	Justin Haley	Spire Motorsports	Chevrolet	33.252	135.330
32	60	Ryan Preece	RFK Racing	Ford	33.282	135.208
33	35	Riley Herbst (R)	23XI Racing	Toyota	33.417	134.662
34	47	Ricky Stenhouse Jr.	Hyak Motorsports	Chevrolet	33.538	134.176
35	10	Ty Dillon	Kaulig Racing	Chevrolet	33.635	133.789
36	51	Cody Ware	Rick Ware Racing	Ford	33.650	133.730
Official qualifying results

== Race ==
=== Stage 1 ===
Just 45 laps long, Stage 1 was a virtual sprint to set the stage for the final two stages of the race. Denny Hamlin took the early lead at the drop of the green flag. But, it was Kyle Larson roaring into the lead looking for the maximum amount of Stage points and that single playoff point for getting a Stage win.

Kyle Busch spun off turn two on lap 27 bringing out the first caution of the afternoon. Fortunately for Kyle he was able to avoid contact with the walls sliding to a stop on the inside of the track. This will set up an interesting pit strategy call for crew chiefs. Larson pitted from the lead with most of the field following him to pit road. Hamlin, Chase Briscoe, Ryan Blaney, Christopher Bell, Ross Chastain, Austin Cindric, and Michael McDowell staying on the track trying to gain as many stage points as possible.

Tyler Reddick had difficulty on his pit stop. His crew failed to get the left rear wheel tight on his race car. Reddick had to stop in a competitors pick for help in getting the wheel secured properly. Pitting outside of his pit stall resulted in a penalty sending to the rear of the field for the restart.

The restart came with 13 laps to go, but did not stay green for long. Josh Berry got a tap on the left rear quarter panel of his race car from Chase Elliott sending him spinning into the outside wall on lap 10. The impact destroyed the left front of the car and sent the Wood Brothers Ford Mustang to the garage. For the second race in a row, Josh Berry will finish dead last on the field, sending him to Bristol in a must win position if he hopes to advance in the postseason.

Restarting this time with just four laps to go, Briscoe was out front. Larson, who did pit, was back to second racing on the fresh tires he got during his stop. The two drivers came to the flag stand side-by-side with one lap to go in Stage 1. It was Briscoe who won the sprint to the green and white checkered flag. His fourth stage win in a row after sweeping all three in his victory last week at Darlington.

Chase Elliott squeezed past Shane van Gisbergen for the final stage point in 10th place.

=== Stage 2 ===
The drivers that did not pit during the Kyle Busch caution came in for service to their race cars during the stage break. Larson inherited the lead with William Byron lining up beside him on the front row. With several fast cars back in the pack the racing was very aggressive.

Larson and Byron led the field back to green again, followed by Elliott, Reddick, and Smith. Two and three wide racing back through the field swapped positions everywhere behind the leaders.

On lap 77, Ty Dillon spun off the front bumper of his brother, Austin Dillon, in turn one. Austin said his car just got loose and he could not avoid the contact. Not what you want to do to a family member, he apologized on the radio. The caution allowed teams who thought they might be short on fuel to come in for a splash of Sunoco Racing Fuel.

With 57 laps to go in the second Stage, green flag racing resumed with some different cars at the from of the pack. Bubba Wallace and Joey Logano sat on row one. Hamlin and Alex Bowman lined up behind them. With Team Penske drivers Cindric and Blaney restarting in row three.

After the initial rush of position swaps, drivers seemed content to settle in and log laps during this stage. Possibly due to some cars still needing to conserve fuel. With 20 laps to go in the stage, the longest green flag run of the race was achieved.

With 10 laps to go in the stage, Wallace still led and Logano followed. Bell, Hamlin and Blaney followed. The closest battle for position was Larson trying to overtake Blaney.

With six laps to go Larson drove too deep into turn three, slid up the banking, and tapped Blaney sending the #12 car into a spin bringing out the caution flag. Almost everyone came to pit road, not wanting to get trapped behind a large number of cars that might have stayed out to grab Stage points.

After a bad pit stop cost them dearly last week at Darlington, Alex Bowman’s crew had another mishap this week. The jack dropped early before the left rear tire was fully seated. The crew had to jack the car up again and finish the stop, sending Bowman far back into the pack for the restart.

Brad Keselowski and Austin Dillon stayed out hoping for a top five finish. Wallace and Logano were first off pit road. Wallace passes for the Stage win, Logano couldn’t get around Keselowski and settles for third.

=== Final stage ===
Wallace and Logano remain the leaders and sit on the front row with Larson and Bell restarting behind them. The field had formed up into three-wide racing down the backstretch. No sooner than the race had restarted than the field was back under caution for debris on the backstretch. A track marker had flown off the catch fence and settled into the racing groove.

This time the leaders line up with Wallace and Logano out front, Larson and Hamlin follow. During the caution. several cars from the rear of the field came to pit road to top off their fuel tanks. With 87 laps to go, they will have to really stretch their fuel mileage to finish without another opportunity to fill up.

Wallace’s car was stuck in gear on the restart and Logano runs off into turn one with the lead. Hamlin tried to grab the top spot but Logano held him off. As the cars at the front scrambled to sort out the jumble that Wallace caused, SVG, running well back in the pack, got loose and spun to the top of the track. This caution brought most of the field to pit road for fuel. Larson had trouble on is stop with the rear diffuser dropping down due to being hit in the rear on the Wallace slow start. This caused an extended delay and second stop to for the crew to rectify the problem.

Back to green flag racing with 78 laps to go, Hamlin and Logano sat on the front row. John Hunter Nemechek and Elliott restarted in row two. The driver on the move was Ty Gibbs making an appearance in the top five for the first time today.

With a variety of fuel and tire strategies being used everyone it trying to conserve something. Another caution would free up drivers to get more aggressive for the final laps of the race.

Alex Bowman recovered from his difficulties to run 11th. Bubba Wallace’s troubles had him running back in 17th with 60 laps to go. Larson sat 19th, and Tyler Reddick was the lowest running Playoff driver in 31st.

Green flag pit stops for the leaders began with 45 laps to go when Briscoe came in for his final stop. Hamlin pitted two laps later. Logano cam in on the following lap giving the lead to Chase Elliott.

Hamlin and Logano returned to the track with almost the same interval between the two cars. Briscoe and Hamlin raced for what they hope to be the lead, once all cars have made their stops.

With 31 laps to go, and in the middle of pit stops, Ty Dillon suffered a brake failure on the right front and slammed into the outside wall bringing out the caution. Fortunately, everyone who had pitted before the caution was on the lead lap when the yellow flag was displayed. Brad Keselowski took over the top spot by default.

Most of the field pitted with the leaders staying on the track. Keselowski, Hamlin, Briscoe, Logano, Elliott, Bell, Chris Buescher, Gibbs, Nemechek, Busch, and Blaney were the drivers opting to not pit. Keselowski had not visited pit road and will restart on old tires and hope the fuel holds out. The others elected to go with the fuel and tires they received on their last stop not too many laps ago.

The race restarted with 25 laps to go with Keselowski and Hamlin on the front row.

Keselowski was quickly swallowed up by Hamlin and Briscoe. Elliott followed soon after. Blaney passed his teammate Logano and then they both dropped Keselowski out of the top five.

With 15 laps to go, Hamlin had stretched the lead to a second and a half. Briscoe had fallen into the clutches of Elliott and Blaney racing side-by-side behind the #19 car.

As the laps ticked off the leaderboard no one in the top five could make a move to advance their position. Denny Hamlin’s 59th Cup Series victory advanced his cushion over Junior Johnson (50 wins) as the driver with the most wins without ever capturing a Cup Series Championship. Joe Gibbs Racing now had two drivers locked into the next round of the Cup Series Playoffs.

=== Race results ===
==== Stage results ====
Stage One Laps: 45

Pos	No	Driver	Team	Manufacturer	Points
1	19	Chase Briscoe (P)	Joe Gibbs Racing	Toyota	10
2	5	Kyle Larson (P)	Hendrick Motorsports	Chevrolet	9
3	11	Denny Hamlin (P)	Joe Gibbs Racing	Toyota	8
4	24	William Byron (P)	Hendrick Motorsports	Chevrolet	7
5	12	Ryan Blaney (P)	Team Penske	Ford	6
6	23	Bubba Wallace (P)	23XI Racing	Toyota	5
7	20	Christopher Bell (P)	Joe Gibbs Racing	Toyota	4
8	1	Ross Chastain (P)	Trackhouse Racing	Chevrolet	3
9	38	Zane Smith	Front Row Motorsports	Ford	2
10	9	Chase Elliott (P)	Hendrick Motorsports	Chevrolet	1
Official stage one results

Stage Two Laps: 95

Pos	No	Driver	Team	Manufacturer	Points
1	23	Bubba Wallace (P)	23XI Racing	Toyota	10
2	6	Brad Keselowski	RFK Racing	Ford	9
3	22	Joey Logano (P)	Team Penske	Ford	8
4	5	Kyle Larson (P)	Hendrick Motorsports	Chevrolet	7
5	20	Christopher Bell (P)	Joe Gibbs Racing	Toyota	6
6	3	Austin Dillon (P)	Richard Childress Racing	Chevrolet	5
7	11	Denny Hamlin (P)	Joe Gibbs Racing	Toyota	4
8	9	Chase Elliott (P)	Hendrick Motorsports	Chevrolet	3
9	42	John Hunter Nemechek	Legacy Motor Club	Toyota	2
10	1	Ross Chastain (P)	Trackhouse Racing	Chevrolet	1
Official stage two results

=== Final Stage results ===
Stage Three Laps: 100

Pos	Grid	No	Driver	Team	Manufacturer	Laps	Points
1	1	11	Denny Hamlin (P)	Joe Gibbs Racing	Toyota	240	53
2	3	19	Chase Briscoe (P)	Joe Gibbs Racing	Toyota	240	45
3	19	9	Chase Elliott (P)	Hendrick Motorsports	Chevrolet	240	38
4	5	12	Ryan Blaney (P)	Team Penske	Ford	240	39
5	13	22	Joey Logano (P)	Team Penske	Ford	240	40
6	20	42	John Hunter Nemechek	Legacy Motor Club	Toyota	240	33
7	8	20	Christopher Bell (P)	Joe Gibbs Racing	Toyota	240	40
8	14	23	Bubba Wallace (P)	23XI Racing	Toyota	240	44
9	11	17	Chris Buescher	RFK Racing	Ford	240	28
10	21	54	Ty Gibbs	Joe Gibbs Racing	Toyota	240	27
11	6	24	William Byron (P)	Hendrick Motorsports	Chevrolet	240	33
12	2	5	Kyle Larson (P)	Hendrick Motorsports	Chevrolet	240	41
13	32	60	Ryan Preece	RFK Racing	Ford	240	24
14	28	71	Michael McDowell	Spire Motorsports	Chevrolet	240	23
15	27	77	Carson Hocevar	Spire Motorsports	Chevrolet	240	22
16	7	45	Tyler Reddick (P)	23XI Racing	Toyota	240	21
17	23	6	Brad Keselowski	RFK Racing	Ford	240	29
18	15	3	Austin Dillon (P)	Richard Childress Racing	Chevrolet	240	24
19	9	2	Austin Cindric (P)	Team Penske	Ford	240	18
20	34	47	Ricky Stenhouse Jr.	Hyak Motorsports	Chevrolet	240	17
21	16	43	Erik Jones	Legacy Motor Club	Toyota	240	16
22	22	8	Kyle Busch	Richard Childress Racing	Chevrolet	240	15
23	17	16	A. J. Allmendinger	Kaulig Racing	Chevrolet	240	14
24	4	1	Ross Chastain (P)	Trackhouse Racing	Chevrolet	240	17
25	18	88	Shane van Gisbergen (P) (R)	Trackhouse Racing	Chevrolet	240	12
26	25	48	Alex Bowman (P)	Hendrick Motorsports	Chevrolet	240	11
27	29	41	Cole Custer	Haas Factory Team	Ford	240	10
28	31	7	Justin Haley	Spire Motorsports	Chevrolet	240	9
29	36	51	Cody Ware	Rick Ware Racing	Ford	240	8
30	24	4	Noah Gragson	Front Row Motorsports	Ford	239	7
31	33	35	Riley Herbst (R)	23XI Racing	Toyota	239	6
32	30	34	Todd Gilliland	Front Row Motorsports	Ford	239	5
33	10	38	Zane Smith	Front Row Motorsports	Ford	239	6
34	35	10	Ty Dillon	Kaulig Racing	Chevrolet	207	3
35	26	99	Daniel Suárez	Trackhouse Racing	Chevrolet	65	2
36	12	21	Josh Berry (P)	Wood Brothers Racing	Ford	36	1
Official race results

=== Race statistics ===
- Lead changes: 15 among 9 different drivers
- Cautions/Laps: 10 for 52
- Red flags: 0
- Time of race: 3 hours, 3 minutes and 11 seconds
- Average speed: 98.262 miles per hour (158.137 km/h)

== Media ==
=== Television ===
USA covered the race on the television side. Leigh Diffey, Jeff Burton and Steve Letarte called the race from the broadcast booth. Kim Coon, Marty Snider and Dillon Welch handled the pit road duties from pit lane.

USA
Booth announcers	Pit reporters
Lap-by-lap: Leigh Diffey; Color-commentator: Jeff Burton; Color-commentator: Steve Letarte	Kim Coon; Marty Snider; Dillon Welch

=== Radio ===
MRN had the radio call for the race, which was also simulcast on Sirius XM NASCAR Radio.

MRN Radio
Booth announcers	Turn announcers	Pit reporters
Lead announcer: Alex Hayden; Announcer: Mike Bagley; Announcer: Rusty Wallace	Turns 1 & 2: Dave Moody; Turns 3 & 4: Kurt Becker	Steve Post; Chris Wilner; Brienne Pedigo

== Standings after the race ==
Drivers' Championship standings

	Pos	Driver	Points
1	1	Denny Hamlin	2,120
1	2	Chase Briscoe	2,115 (–5)
	3	Kyle Larson	2,103 (–17)
1	4	Bubba Wallace	2,093 (–27)
2	5	Ryan Blaney	2,085 (–35)
	6	William Byron	2,082 (–38)
3	7	Tyler Reddick	2,080 (–40)
2	8	Christopher Bell	2,075 (–45)
2	9	Chase Elliott	2,071 (–49)
3	10	Joey Logano	2,064 (–56)
3	11	Ross Chastain	2,062 (–58)
3	12	Austin Cindric	2,054 (–66)
1	13	Austin Dillon	2,043 (–77)
2	14	Shane van Gisbergen	2,039 (–81)
	15	Alex Bowman	2,019 (–101)
	16	Josh Berry	2,009 (–111)
Official driver's standings

Manufacturers' Championship standings

Pos	Manufacturer	Points
1	Chevrolet	1,026
2	Toyota	1,000 (–26)
3	Ford	932 (–94)

- Note: Only the first 16 positions are included for the driver standings.

Previous race: 2025 Cook Out Southern 500	NASCAR Cup Series; 2025 season	Next race: 2025 Bass Pro Shops Night Race
