= Justin Haley (racing driver) =

American racing driver (born 1999)

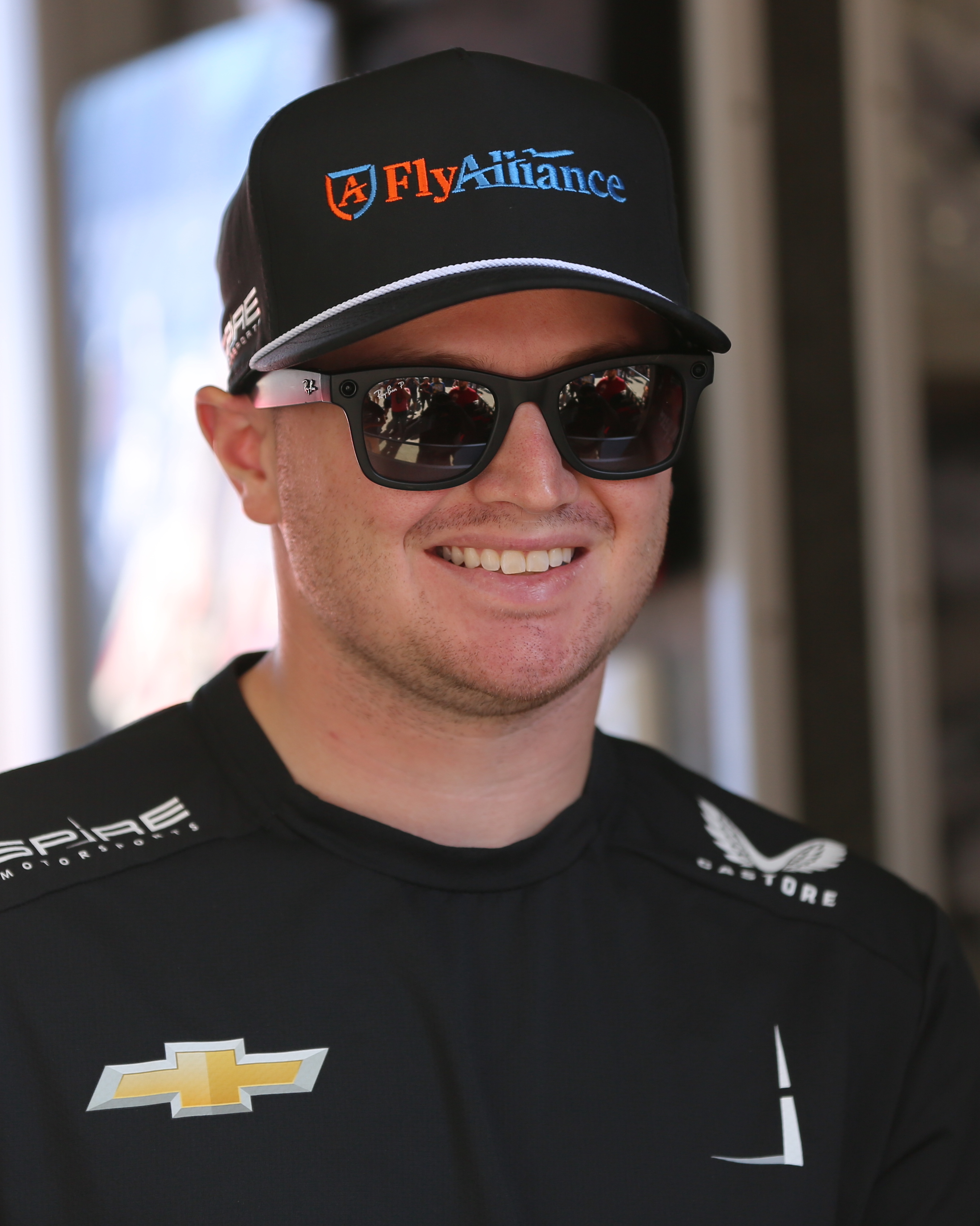
- Haley at Las Vegas Motor Speedway in 2025
- Born: Justin Christmann Haley; April 28, 1999 (age 27); Winamac, Indiana, U.S.
- Height: 5 ft 2 in (1.57 m)
- Achievements: 2016 NASCAR K&N Pro Series East Champion

NASCAR Cup Series career
- 181 races run over 8 years
- 2026 position: 47th
- Best finish: 22nd (2022)
- First race: 2019 GEICO 500 (Talladega)
- Last race: 2026 Season Finale 400 (Homestead)
- First win: 2019 Coke Zero Sugar 400 (Daytona)
Wins	Top tens	Poles
1	18	0

NASCAR O'Reilly Auto Parts Series career
- 108 races run over 7 years
- 2025 position: 94th
- Best finish: 3rd (2020)
- First race: 2018 Iowa 250 (Iowa)
- Last race: 2025 Wawa 250 (Daytona)
- First win: 2020 Unhinged 300 (Talladega)
- Last win: 2021 Wawa 250 (Daytona)
Wins	Top tens	Poles
4	69	0

NASCAR FedEx Freight Truck Series career
- 78 races run over 7 years
- Truck no., team: No. 16 (Kaulig Racing)
- 2026 position: 15th
- Best finish: 3rd (2018)
- First race: 2015 UNOH 200 (Bristol)
- Last race: 2026 Craftsman 200 (Homestead)
- First win: 2018 Eaton 200 (Gateway)
- Last win: 2018 JAG Metals 350 (Texas)
Wins	Top tens	Poles
3	39	1

ARCA Menards Series career
- 16 races run over 4 years
- Best finish: 28th (2014)
- First race: 2014 Menards 200 (Toledo)
- Last race: 2017 Kansas 150 (Kansas)
- First win: 2016 SuperChevyStores.com 100 (Springfield)
- Last win: 2017 ModSpace 150 (Pocono)
Wins	Top tens	Poles
3	12	1

ARCA Menards Series East career
- 31 races run over 3 years
- Best finish: 1st (2016)
- First race: 2014 JEGS 150 (Columbus)
- Last race: 2016 Dover 125 (Dover)
- First win: 2016 Kevin Whitaker Chevrolet 150 (Greenville-Pickens)
- Last win: 2016 NAPA 150 (Columbus)
Wins	Top tens	Poles
2	25	2

ARCA Menards Series West career
- 3 races run over 2 years
- Best finish: 36th (2015)
- First race: 2014 Casino Arizona 100 (Phoenix)
- Last race: 2015 Casino Arizona 100 (Phoenix)
Wins	Top tens	Poles
0	1	1
- Statistics up to date as of November 8, 2026.

Justin Christmann Haley (born April 28, 1999) is an American professional stock car racing driver. He competes full-time in the NASCAR Truck Series, driving the No. 16 Ram 1500 for Kaulig Racing. He previously went by his nickname J. J. Haley, until he switched to his first name in January 2016 to avoid confusion with fellow competitor J. J. Yeley. Haley owns Darkhorse Racecars, a dirt late model and dirt modified chassis manufacturer.

Haley had a shocking win in the 2019 Coke Zero Sugar 400 at Daytona in just his third career Cup Series start due to being in the lead, through pit strategy, under caution when lightning and eventual rain hit the area. After scoring his first Xfinity victory in 2020, Haley became the 32nd driver to win a race in all three NASCAR national touring series.

== Racing career ==
Haley began his racing career at the age of nine, in Quarter Midgets at Kokomo Quarter Midget Club during the late summer months of 2008. In 2009 and 2010, he scored in the KQMC, Indiana State Series, and in 2011, the Light 160 State Championships.

=== Regional series ===
In 2014, Haley ran three K&N Pro Series East races, recording a best finish of seventh at Dover International Speedway. The next year, he joined HScott Motorsports to compete full-time in the Pro Series East, competing for Rookie of the Year honors. In 2016, Haley recorded his first career Pro Series East win at Greenville-Pickens Speedway. Haley won his first Pro Series East championship in 2016 after finishing in the top-ten in all fourteen races, the only driver to do so in series history.

=== Craftsman Truck Series ===
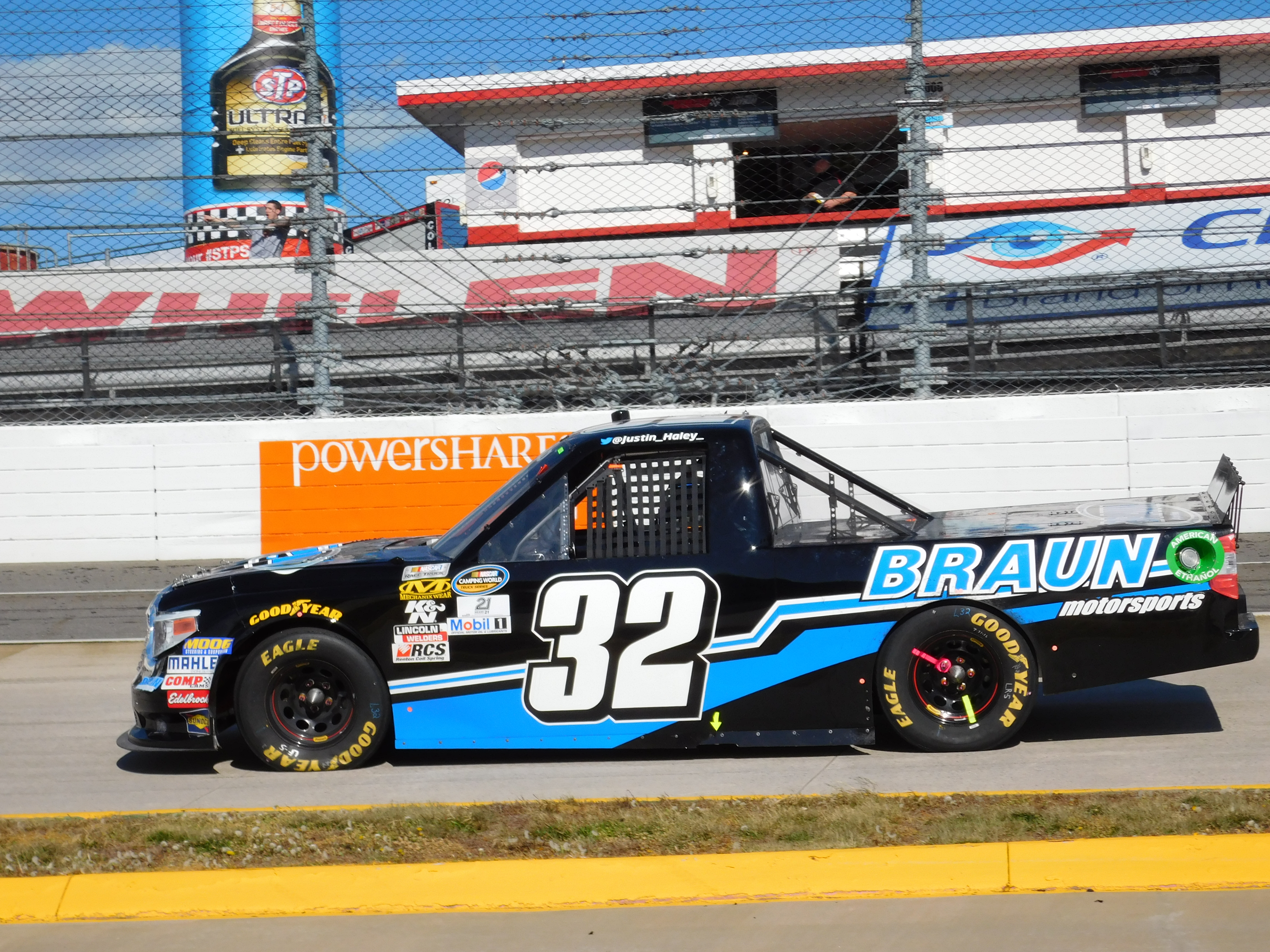
Haley's No. 32 truck at Martinsville Speedway in 2016

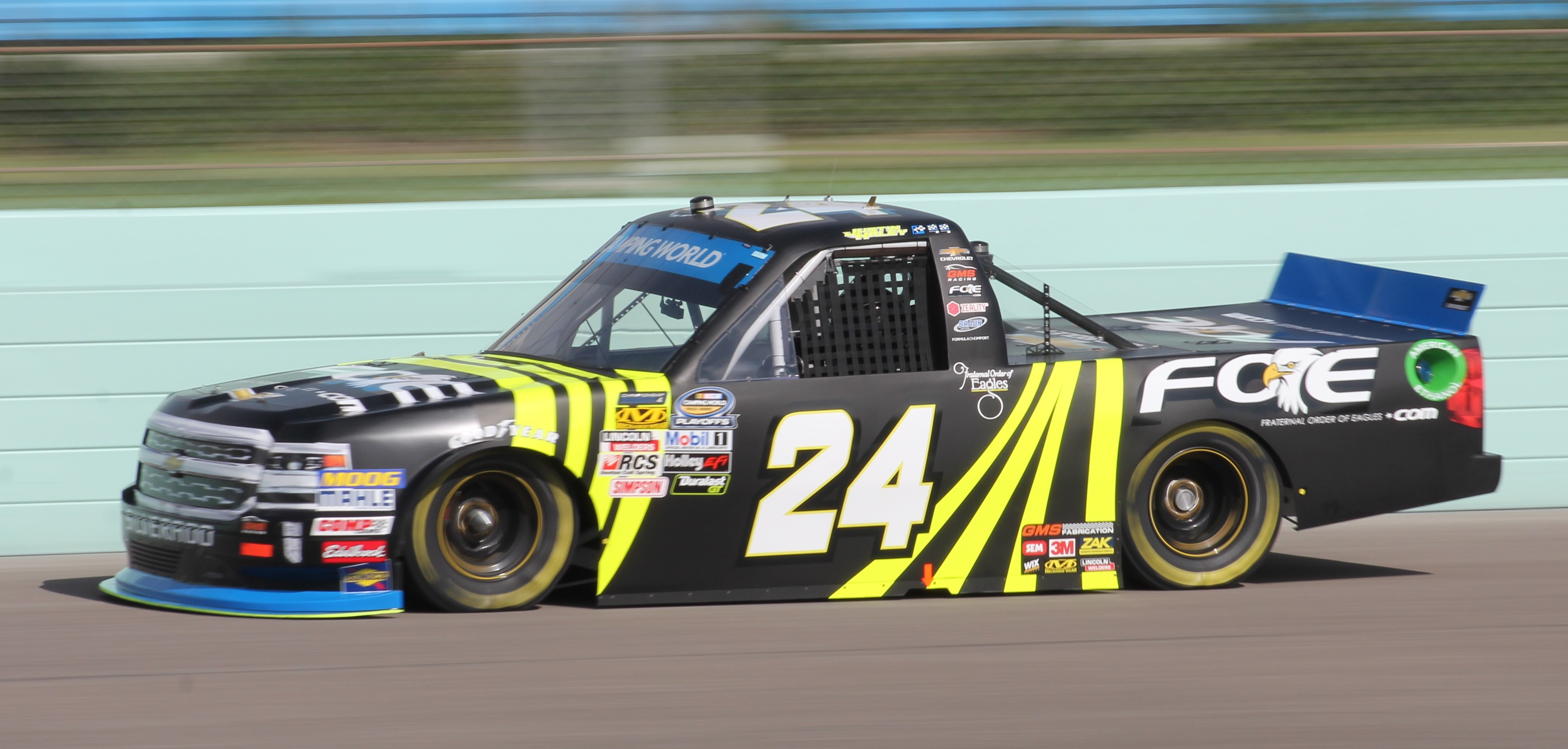
Haley racing at Homestead–Miami Speedway in 2018

In 2015, Haley made his Camping World Truck Series debut at Bristol with Braun Motorsports, driving the No. 32 Chevrolet Silverado and finishing fourteenth. His following Truck race at Martinsville Speedway ended when he was involved in a crash on lap 119. At Phoenix International Raceway, Haley recorded his first top-ten, when he finished in seventh. On December 9, 2016, it was announced that Haley would drive the No. 24 truck for GMS Racing in 2017, starting with the third race of the year.

Haley joined GMS full-time in 2017, driving the No. 24 Silverado. However, Haley missed the first two races – the NextEra Energy Resources 250 at Daytona International Speedway and the Active Pest Control 200 at Atlanta Motor Speedway – due to NASCAR's age restriction. Scott Lagasse Jr. and Alex Bowman replaced Haley at Daytona and Atlanta, respectively. He missed the playoffs and finished twelfth in the final point standings. In June 2018, he earned his first career win at Gateway, which locked him into the playoffs for the first time. Haley would get his second win of the season at Canadian Tire Motorsport Park after leaders Todd Gilliland and Noah Gragson took each other out in the final corner. In Texas, he got his third win after race leader Gilliland ran out of fuel on the last lap. As a result of these two wins, Haley qualified for the playoff finale at Homestead. Haley finished third in the points standings after finishing eighth at Homestead.

Haley returned to GMS and the Truck Series in July 2020 at Texas.

On January 29, 2025, it was announced that Haley would return to the Truck Series, driving the No. 7 truck for Spire Motorsports at Daytona.

On October 29, 2025, Kaulig Racing announced Haley will join their Ram Trucks team in 2026.

=== Xfinity Series ===
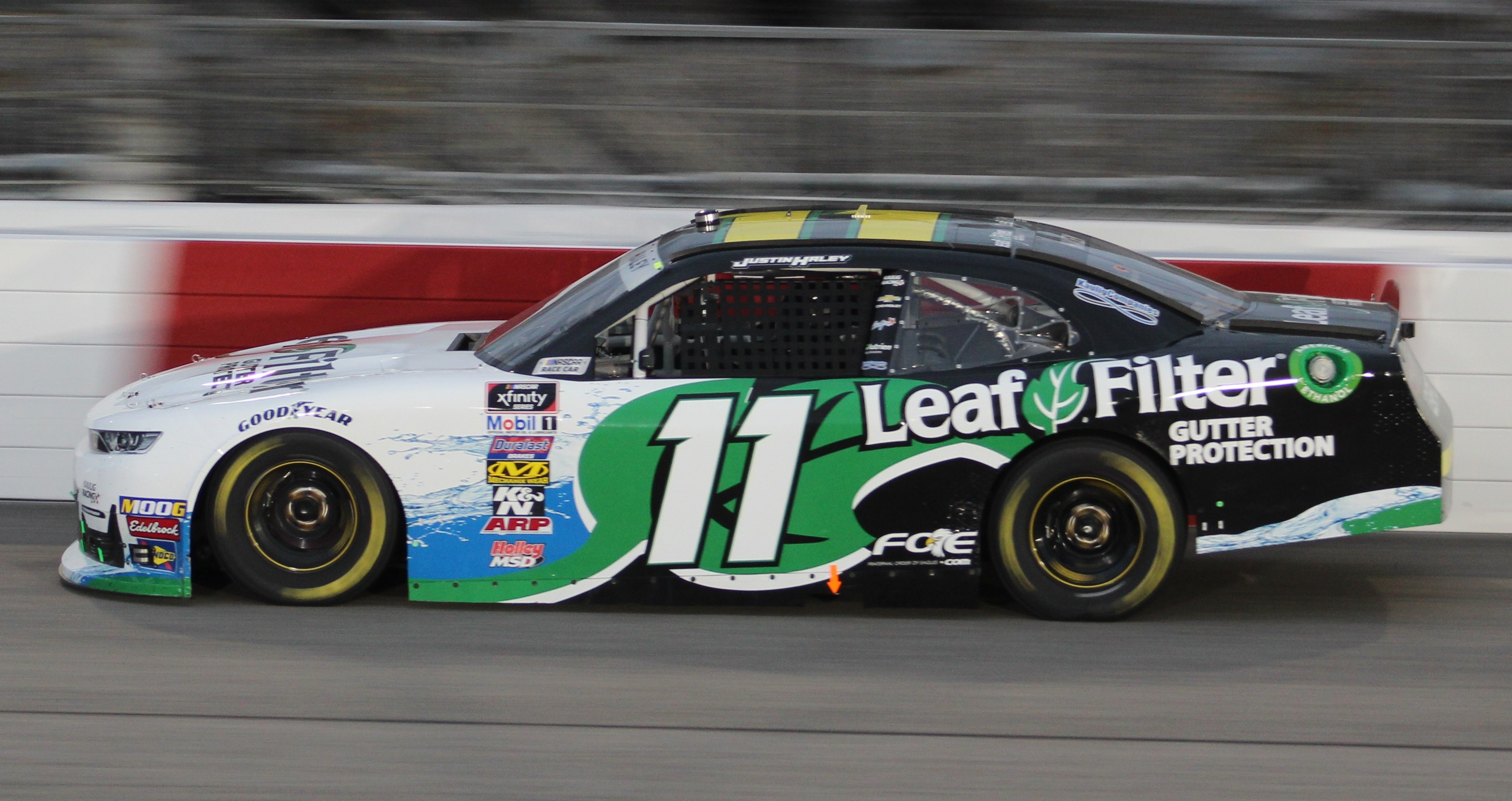
Haley's 2019 Xfinity car at Richmond Raceway

In June 2018, Haley made his NASCAR Xfinity Series debut at Iowa Speedway, driving the No. 23 for GMS Racing while filling for Spencer Gallagher. He would go on to finish twelfth.

Haley drove the No. 24 car at Daytona in July 2018 for GMS Racing, where he unofficially won the race ahead of Kyle Larson and Elliott Sadler. However, it was revealed that Haley went below the double yellow line to pass both of the leaders just before the finish line, and NASCAR ruled Haley's pass illegal after the race, giving Larson the win, while Haley finished eighteenth.

On December 1, 2018, it was announced that Haley signed a multi-year deal to drive the No. 11 full-time for Kaulig Racing in 2019, replacing Ryan Truex. He finished second in the 2019 Daytona July race to Kaulig teammate Ross Chastain. Haley qualified for the Xfinity playoffs, but was eliminated after the Round of 12. He ended the 2019 season twelfth in points with twenty top-tens.

In June 2020, Haley scored his first Xfinity victory at Talladega Superspeedway after starting on the pole and winning the first stage. He became the 32nd driver to win a race in all three NASCAR national series.

On October 19, 2020, Haley and Kaulig announced a third season together in 2021. Haley missed the Dover race in May due to COVID-19 protocols and was replaced by Zane Smith. On August 28, 2021, Haley scored his only victory of the 2021 Xfinity season by winning at the July Daytona race for the second year in a row; this time over teammate A. J. Allmendinger by .023 seconds. He ended up reaching the Round of 8 and finished the season sixth in points.

=== Cup Series ===
In April 2019, Haley joined Spire Motorsports' No. 77 for his Monster Energy NASCAR Cup Series debut in the GEICO 500 at Talladega Superspeedway. With seven laps remaining, he was collected in a crash with Matt DiBenedetto, Chris Buescher, and Martin Truex Jr., finishing the race in 32nd. He returned to the team at Sonoma Raceway in June, finishing 34th.

For Daytona's 2019 Coke Zero Sugar 400, he qualified 34th. In the race, with around thirty laps to go, Austin Dillon and Clint Bowyer tangled, causing "The Big One". Haley, in 27th, narrowly avoided it and sneaked into third. Race leader Kurt Busch and second-place Landon Cassill would pit under caution but Haley did not, inheriting the lead just before lightning struck near the race track, red-flagging the race. After hours of red flag conditions, the race was called, securing Haley's first Cup win in his third start and Spire's first win in their maiden season. Since Haley was accepting points for the 2019 Xfinity Series, and was not competing full-time in the Cup Series, he was not eligible for the 2019 Cup playoffs.

On January 10, 2020, Kaulig Racing announced Haley would drive for the team at the Daytona 500 in the No. 16. On February 9, Haley made the field by posting the fastest qualifying speed of all the non-charter teams (190.018 mph; 31st overall). After starting 33rd, he was involved in a lap 184 wreck that resulted in a red flag but finished thirteenth. In July, Haley rejoined Spire for the 2020 NASCAR All-Star Race at Bristol, having qualified via his 2019 Daytona win; he finished fourteenth.

Haley was offered a contract by Spire for the 2021 NASCAR Cup Series season. When COVID-19 protocols forced him to miss the Drydene 400 at Dover, Josh Berry took over the No. 77. Haley ran 31 races during the season; thirty races for Spire in the No. 77 and one race for Kaulig in the No. 16.

In June 2021, Kaulig Racing announced, in conjunction with going full-time in the Cup Series in 2022, that Haley would race full-time in one of the team's two charters. On December 15, 2021, Kaulig Racing revealed that Haley would drive the No. 31 entry for the team.

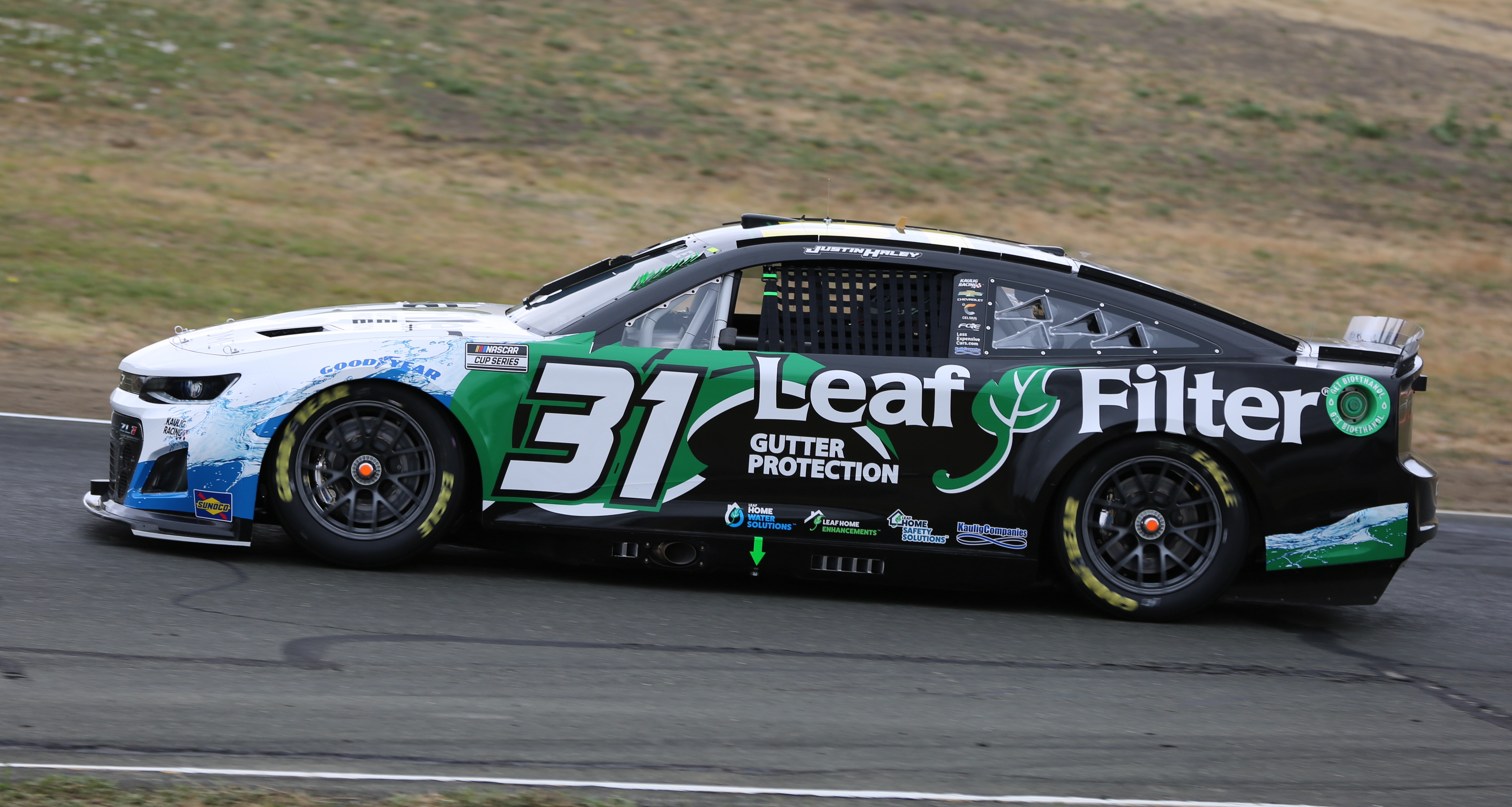
Haley competing in the 2022 Toyota/Save Mart 350 at Sonoma

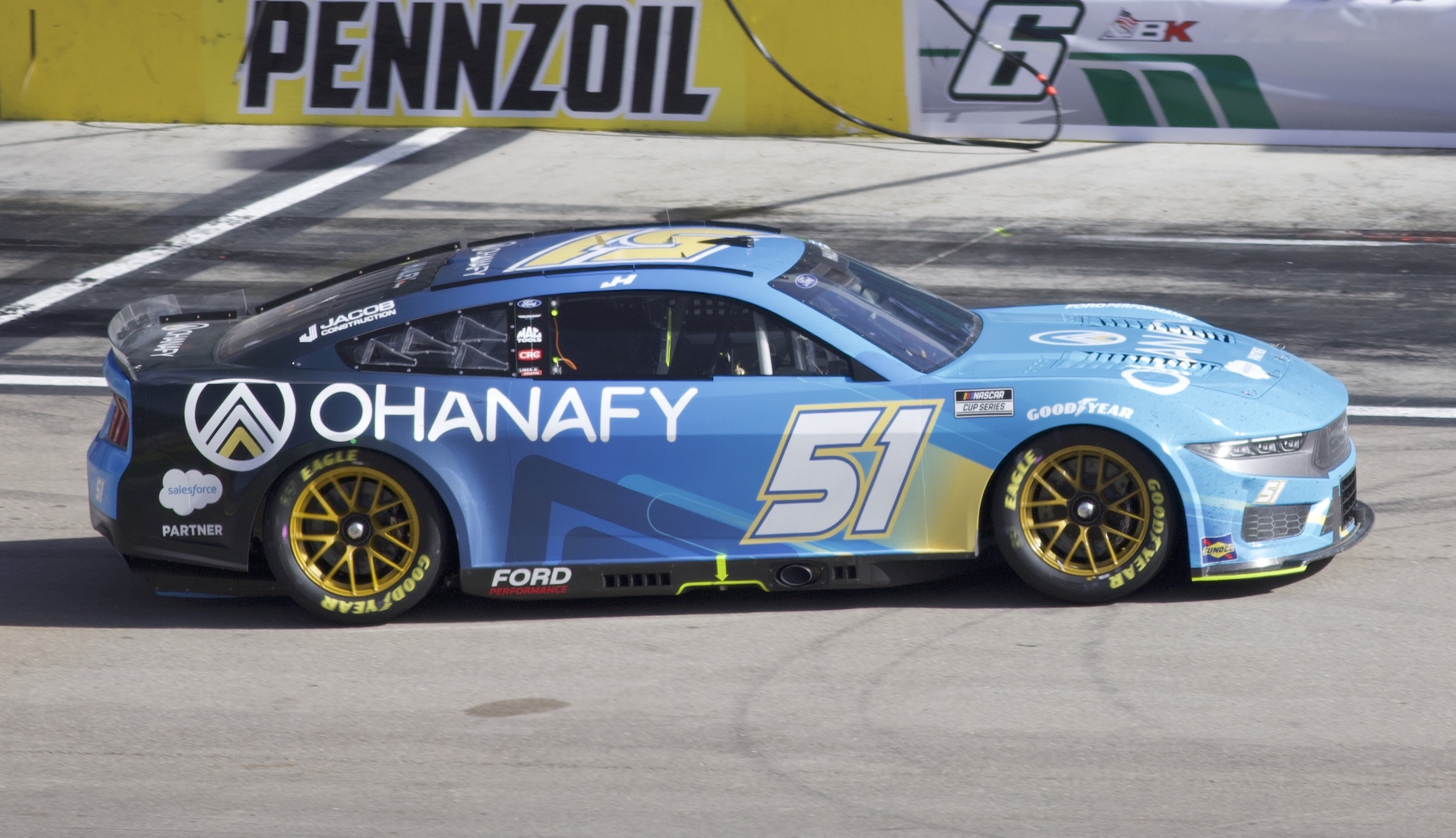
Haley's No. 51 car at Las Vegas Motor Speedway in 2024

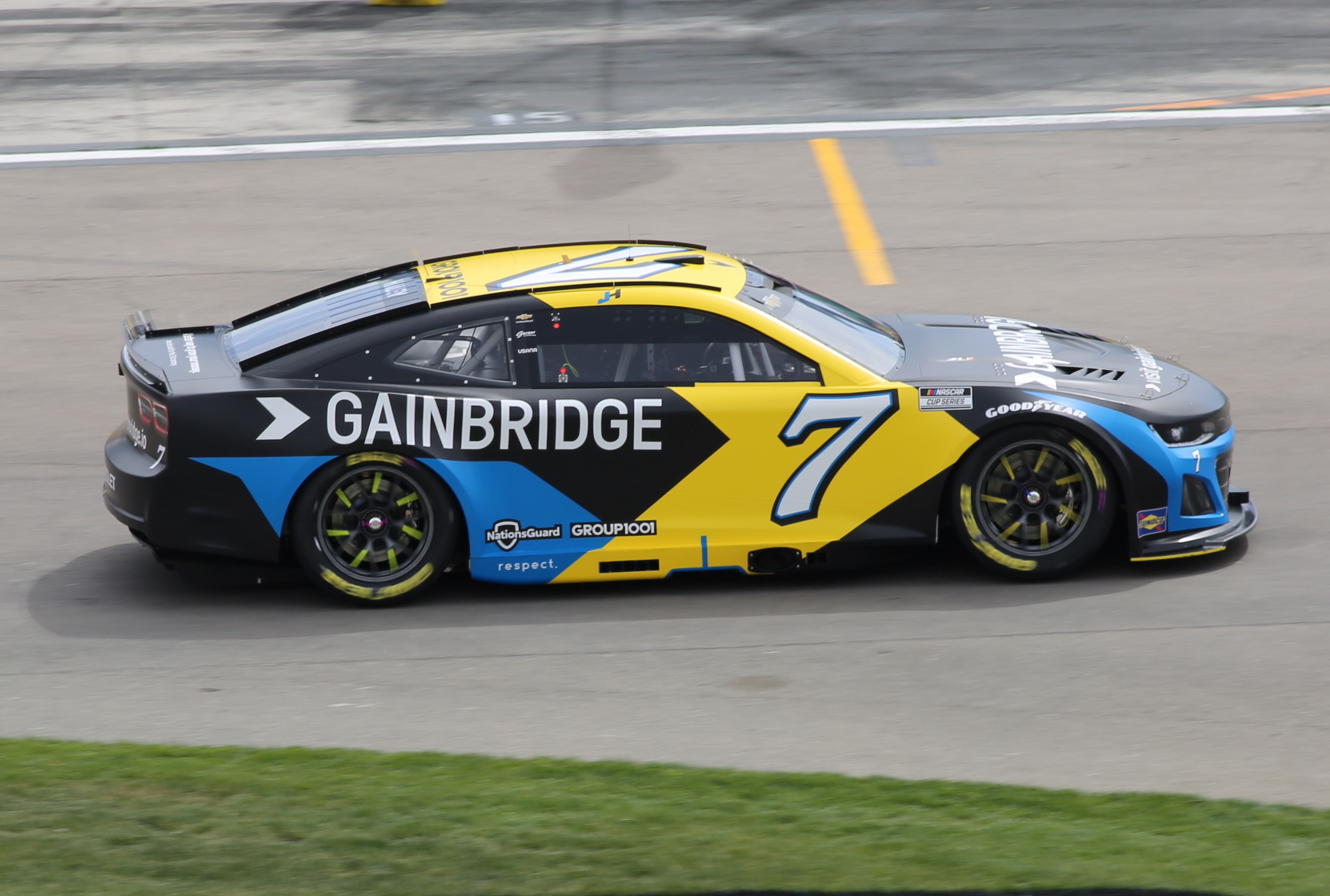
Haley's No. 7 car at Las Vegas Motor Speedway in 2025

Haley began the 2023 season with a 32nd-place finish at the 2023 Daytona 500. On March 15, 2023, the No. 31 was served an L2 penalty after unapproved hood louvers were found installed on the car during pre-race inspection at Phoenix; as a result, the team was docked 100 driver and owner points and 10 playoff points. In addition, crew chief Trent Owens was suspended for four races and fined US$100,000. On April 5, 2023, the National Motorsports Appeals Panel amended the penalty, upholding the fine, Owens' suspension, and 10 playoff points, but reducing the 100 driver and owner points deduction to 75 points. On April 19, 2023, the Final Appeals Officer rescinded all points deductions levied against the team. Haley nearly won the inaugural race at the Chicago Street Course, but lost the lead to Shane van Gisbergen late and was unable to pass him. On July 20, 2023, it was announced that Haley would move over to Rick Ware Racing in 2024, for a multi-year contract.

Haley started the 2024 season with a 26th-place finish at the 2024 Daytona 500. At the Circuit of the Americas, Haley finished seventeenth but was later disqualified after post-race inspection revealed his car did not meet the minimum weight requirement. At the Goodyear 400 at Darlington, Haley would put up a solid race and finish ninth, earning his first top-ten with Rick Ware Racing. Two weeks later, at Gateway, he would score his second top-ten, another ninth-place finish.

On September 20, 2024, it was announced that Haley and Spire Motorsports driver Corey LaJoie would perform a driver swap during the 2024 Hollywood Casino 400 and the following races. It was also later announced that Haley would replace LaJoie full-time in 2025. At Talladega, Haley would score his fourth top-ten finish for Spire, bringing the car home to a seventh-place finish. This would be Haley's best finish of the entire year. He would finish 31st in the final point standings.

On October 14, 2025, Spire announced that the team and Haley would part ways after the 2025 season.

In 2026, Haley would make a one-off return with Spire in the No. 77 at Homestead, serving as a replacement for regular driver Carson Hocevar after he was suspended by the team following the previous race at Martinsville.

== Personal life ==
Haley is the nephew of Todd Braun, owner of Braun Motorsports. He lives in North Carolina. He is one of four children, with two younger sisters and an older brother.

Haley is vegan.

On November 17, 2023, Haley married Haley Mottinger.

== Motorsports career results ==
=== Stock car career summary ===
Season	Series	Team	Races	Wins	Top 5	Top 10	Points	Position
2014	NASCAR K&N Pro Series East	Braun Racing	3	0	0	1	82	33rd
2014	NASCAR K&N Pro Series West	Bob Wood	1	0	0	0	18	81st
2014	ARCA Racing Series	Venturini Motorsports	6	0	1	4	1055	28th
2015	NASCAR Camping World Truck Series	Braun Motorsports	3	0	0	1	79	43rd
2015	NASCAR K&N Pro Series East	HScott Motorsports with Justin Marks	14	0	6	10	491	6th
2015	NASCAR K&N Pro Series West	HScott Motorsports with Justin Marks	2	0	1	1	66	36th
2015	ARCA Racing Series	HScott Motorsports	3	0	2	2	530	43rd
2016	NASCAR Camping World Truck Series	Braun Motorsports	3	0	0	0	23	47th
2016	NASCAR K&N Pro Series East	HScott Motorsports with Justin Marks	14	2	13	14	580	**1st**
2016	ARCA Racing Series	Braun Motorsports	3	0	1	2	780	35th
2016	ARCA Racing Series	Mason Mitchell Motorsports	1	1	1	1	780	35th
2017	NASCAR Camping World Truck Series	GMS Racing	21	0	3	12	600	12th
2017	ARCA Racing Series	MDM Motorsports	1	1	1	1	680	35th
2017	ARCA Racing Series	Mason Mitchell Motorsports	2	1	1	2	680	35th
2018	NASCAR Xfinity Series	GMS Racing	3	0	0	0	0	NC†
2018	NASCAR Camping World Truck Series	GMS Racing	23	3	9	18	4029	**3rd**
2019	NASCAR Cup Series	Spire Motorsports	3	1	1	1	0	NC†
2019	NASCAR Xfinity Series	Kaulig Racing	33	0	4	20	2155	12th
2020	NASCAR Cup Series	Kaulig Racing	1	0	0	0	0	NC†
2020	NASCAR Cup Series	Spire Motorsports	1	0	0	0	0	NC†
2020	NASCAR Xfinity Series	Kaulig Racing	33	3	10	21	4029	**3rd**
2020	NASCAR Gander RV & Outdoors Truck Series	GMS Racing	1	0	0	1	0	NC†
2021	NASCAR Cup Series	Spire Motorsports	30	0	0	2	0	NC†
2021	NASCAR Cup Series	Kaulig Racing	1	0	0	0	0	NC†
2021	NASCAR Xfinity Series	Kaulig Racing	32	1	9	24	2244	6th
2022	NASCAR Cup Series	Kaulig Racing	36	0	3	4	699	22nd
2022	NASCAR Xfinity Series	Kaulig Racing	1	0	0	0	0	NC†
2023	NASCAR Cup Series	Kaulig Racing	36	0	1	6	593	26th
2023	NASCAR Xfinity Series	Kaulig Racing	5	0	1	4	0	NC†
2024	NASCAR Cup Series	Rick Ware Racing	29	0	0	2	503	31st
2024	NASCAR Cup Series	Spire Motorsports	7	0	0	1	503	31st
2025	NASCAR Cup Series	Spire Motorsports	36	0	1	2	559	31st
2025	NASCAR Craftsman Truck Series	Spire Motorsports	2	0	1	1	0	NC†
2025	NASCAR Xfinity Series	Kaulig Racing	1	0	0	0	0	NC†
2026	NASCAR Craftsman Truck Series	Kaulig Racing	25	0	1	6	496	15th
2026	NASCAR Cup Series	Spire Motorsports	1	0	0	0	0	NC†

^{†} As Haley was a guest driver, he was ineligible for championship points.

=== NASCAR ===
(key) (Bold – Pole position awarded by qualifying time. Italics – Pole position earned by points standings or practice time. * – Most laps led.)

==== Cup Series ====
NASCAR Cup Series results
Year	Team	No.	Make	1	2	3	4	5	6	7	8	9	10	11	12	13	14	15	16	17	18	19	20	21	22	23	24	25	26	27	28	29	30	31	32	33	34	35	36	NCSC	Pts	Ref
2019	Spire Motorsports	77	Chevy	DAY	ATL	LVS	PHO	CAL	MAR	TEX	BRI	RCH	TAL; 32	DOV	KAN	CLT	POC	MCH	SON; 34	CHI	DAY; 1	KEN	NHA	POC	GLN	MCH	BRI	DAR	IND	LVS	RCH	ROV	DOV	TAL	KAN	MAR	TEX	PHO	HOM	41st	0^{1}	
2020	Kaulig Racing	16	Chevy	DAY; 13	LVS	CAL	PHO	DAR	DAR	CLT	CLT	BRI	ATL	MAR	HOM	TAL	POC	POC	IND	KEN	TEX	KAN	NHA	MCH	MCH	DRC	DOV	DOV	DAY	DAR	RCH	BRI	LVS							41st	0^{1}	
2020	Spire Motorsports	77	Chevy																															TAL; 11	ROV	KAN	TEX	MAR	PHO	41st	0^{1}	
2021	Spire Motorsports	77	Chevy	DAY	DRC; 24	HOM; 26	LVS; 29	PHO; 24	ATL; 30	BRD	MAR; 35	RCH; 38	TAL; 30	KAN; 30	DAR; 28	DOV	COA; 40	CLT; 28	SON	NSH; 35	POC; 27	POC	ROA; 25	ATL; 29	NHA; 28	GLN; 29	IRC; 8	MCH; 25	DAY; 6	DAR; 25	RCH; 27	BRI; 36	LVS; 32		ROV; 37	TEX; 37	KAN; 39	MAR; 31	PHO; 26	44th	0^{1}	
2021	Kaulig Racing	16	Chevy																															TAL; 20						44th	0^{1}	
2022	Kaulig Racing	31	Chevy	DAY; 23	CAL; 23	LVS; 17	PHO; 17	ATL; 11	COA; 15	RCH; 29	MAR; 31	BRD; 14	TAL; 12	DOV; 11	DAR; 3	KAN; 35	CLT; 27	GTW; 14	SON; 12	NSH; 23	ROA; 24	ATL; 7	NHA; 20	POC; 21	IRC; 19	MCH; 17	RCH; 21	GLN; 18	DAY; 28	DAR; 19	KAN; 19	BRI; 12	TEX; 3	TAL; 15	ROV; 5	LVS; 14	HOM; 28	MAR; 27	PHO; 27	22nd	699	
2023	Kaulig Racing	31	Chevy	DAY; 32	CAL; 21	LVS; 8	PHO; 27	ATL; 22	COA; 19	RCH; 29	BRD; 6	MAR; 28	TAL; 19	DOV; 23	KAN; 18	DAR; 8	CLT; 15	GTW; 16	SON; 21	NSH; 23	CSC; 2	ATL; 8	NHA; 17	POC; 33	RCH; 30	MCH; 23	IRC; 38	GLN; 24	DAY; 21	DAR; 24	KAN; 21	BRI; 35	TEX; 13	TAL; 6	ROV; 22	LVS; 22	HOM; 23	MAR; 30	PHO; 29	26th	593	
2024	Rick Ware Racing	51	Ford	DAY; 26	ATL; 20	LVS; 27	PHO; 24	BRI; 17	COA; 39	RCH; 32	MAR; 30	TEX; 24	TAL; 34	DOV; 23	KAN; 18	DAR; 9	CLT; 22	GTW; 9	SON; 33	IOW; 13	NHA; 29	NSH; 13	CSC; 16	POC; 22	IND; 20	RCH; 27	MCH; 20	DAY; 32	DAR; 27	ATL; 12	GLN; 29	BRI; 22								31st	503	
2024	Spire Motorsports	7	Chevy																														KAN; 33	TAL; 7	ROV; 26	LVS; 17	HOM; 34	MAR; 29	PHO; 28	31st	503	
2025	Spire Motorsports	7	Chevy	DAY; 19	ATL; 24	COA; 16	PHO; 34	LVS; 14	HOM; 10	MAR; 28	DAR; 24	BRI; 13	TAL; 25	TEX; 15	KAN; 31	CLT; 30	NSH; 32	MCH; 21	MXC; 24	POC; 19	ATL; 23	CSC; 22	SON; 15	DOV; 17	IND; 11	IOW; 23	GLN; 27	RCH; 37	DAY; 3	DAR; 27	GTW; 28	BRI; 13	NHA; 33	KAN; 18	ROV; 25	LVS; 27	TAL; 39	MAR; 19	PHO; 14	31st	559	
2026	Spire Motorsports	77	Chevy	DAY	ATL	COA	PHO	LVS	DAR	MAR	BRI	KAN	TAL	TEX	GLN	CLT	NSH	MCH	POC	COR	SON	CHI	ATL	NWS	IND	IOW	RCH	NHA	DAY	DAR	GTW	BRI	KAN	LVS	CLT	PHO	TAL	MAR	HOM; 21	47th	0^{1}	

===== Daytona 500 =====
Year	Team	Manufacturer	Start	Finish
2020	Kaulig Racing	Chevrolet	33	13
2022	Kaulig Racing	Chevrolet	25	23
2023	Kaulig Racing	Chevrolet	28	32
2024	Rick Ware Racing	Ford	22	26
2025	Spire Motorsports	Chevrolet	35	19

==== Xfinity Series ====
NASCAR Xfinity Series results
Year	Team	No.	Make	1	2	3	4	5	6	7	8	9	10	11	12	13	14	15	16	17	18	19	20	21	22	23	24	25	26	27	28	29	30	31	32	33	NXSC	Pts	Ref
2018	GMS Racing	23	Chevy	DAY	ATL	LVS	PHO	CAL	TEX	BRI	RCH	TAL	DOV	CLT	POC	MCH	IOW; 12	CHI																			101st	0^{1}	
2018	GMS Racing	24	Chevy																DAY; 18	KEN	NHA	IOW	GLN; 38	MOH	BRI	ROA	DAR	IND	LVS	RCH	ROV	DOV	KAN	TEX	PHO	HOM	101st	0^{1}	
2019	Kaulig Racing	11	Chevy	DAY; 17	ATL; 8	LVS; 10	PHO; 12	CAL; 10	TEX; 7	BRI; 7	RCH; 10	TAL; 7	DOV; 17	CLT; 5	POC; 9	MCH; 10	IOW; 13	CHI; 7	DAY; 2	KEN; 10	NHA; 13	IOW; 8	GLN; 14	MOH; 9	BRI; 34	ROA; 6	DAR; 11	IND; 5	LVS; 15	RCH; 17	ROV; 31	DOV; 4	KAN; 7	TEX; 32	PHO; 7	HOM; 33	12th	2155	
2020	Kaulig Racing	11	Chevy	DAY; 6	LVS; 12	CAL; 5	PHO; 5	DAR; 10	CLT; 29	BRI; 17	ATL; 3	HOM; 13	HOM; 6	TAL; 1	POC; 23	IRC; 2	KEN; 7	KEN; 3	TEX; 8	KAN; 6	ROA; 11	DRC; 38	DOV; 8	DOV; 12	DAY; 1	DAR; 13	RCH; 2	RCH; 6	BRI; 16	LVS; 10	TAL; 1	ROV; 35	KAN; 4	TEX; 7	MAR; 12	PHO; 8	3rd	4029	
2021	Kaulig Racing	11	Chevy	DAY; 29	DRC; 9	HOM; 6	LVS; 8	PHO; 26	ATL; 8	MAR; 8	TAL; 8	DAR; 14	DOV	COA; 9	CLT; 19	MOH; 2	TEX; 9	NSH; 19	POC; 38	ROA; 10	ATL; 4	NHA; 6	GLN; 9	IRC; 3	MCH; 17	DAY; 1	DAR; 4	RCH; 2	BRI; 6	LVS; 9	TAL; 6	ROV; 4	TEX; 7	KAN; 4	MAR; 33	PHO; 5	6th	2244	
2022	Kaulig Racing	14	Chevy	DAY	CAL	LVS	PHO	ATL	COA	RCH	MAR	TAL	DOV	DAR	TEX	CLT	PIR	NSH	ROA	ATL	NHA	POC	IRC	MCH	GLN	DAY; 25	DAR	KAN	BRI	TEX	TAL	ROV	LVS	HOM	MAR	PHO	102nd	0^{1}	
2023	Kaulig Racing	10	Chevy	DAY; 10	CAL	LVS	PHO	ATL; 10	COA	RCH	MAR	TAL	DOV	DAR	CLT; 12	PIR	SON	NSH	CSC	ATL; 4*	NHA	POC	ROA	MCH	IRC	GLN	DAY; 10	DAR	KAN	BRI	TEX	ROV	LVS	HOM	MAR	PHO	82nd	0^{1}	
2025	Kaulig Racing	11	Chevy	DAY	ATL	COA	PHO	LVS	HOM	MAR	DAR	BRI	CAR	TAL	TEX	CLT	NSH	MXC	POC	ATL	CSC	SON	DOV	IND	IOW	GLN	DAY; 19	PIR	GTW	BRI	KAN	ROV	LVS	TAL	MAR	PHO	94th	0^{1}	

==== Truck Series ====
NASCAR Truck Series results
Year	Team	No.	Make	1	2	3	4	5	6	7	8	9	10	11	12	13	14	15	16	17	18	19	20	21	22	23	24	25	NTSC	Pts	Ref
2015	Braun Motorsports	32	Chevy	DAY	ATL	MAR	KAN	CLT	DOV	TEX	GTW	IOW	KEN	ELD	POC	MCH	BRI; 14	MSP	CHI	NHA	LVS	TAL	MAR; 32	TEX	PHO; 7	HOM			43rd	79	
2016	Braun Motorsports	32	Toyota	DAY	ATL	MAR; 26	KAN	DOV	CLT	TEX	IOW																		47th	23	
2016	Braun Motorsports	32	Chevy									GTW; 21	KEN	ELD	POC	BRI	MCH	MSP; 29	CHI	NHA	LVS	TAL	MAR	TEX	PHO	HOM			47th	23	
2017	GMS Racing	24	Chevy	DAY	ATL	MAR; 26	KAN; 9	CLT; 17	DOV; 8	TEX; 6	GTW; 10	IOW; 10	KEN; 3	ELD; 8	POC; 10	MCH; 10	BRI; 11	MSP; 4	CHI; 14	NHA; 13	LVS; 21	TAL; 16	MAR; 11	**TEX**; 5	PHO; 14	HOM; 9			12th	600	
2018	GMS Racing	24	Chevy	DAY; 2	ATL; 22	LVS; 28	MAR; 10	DOV; 3	KAN; 10	CLT; 14	TEX; 3	IOW; 16	GTW; 1	CHI; 6	KEN; 10	ELD; 9	POC; 5	MCH; 9	BRI; 6	MSP; 1	LVS; 3	TAL; 4	MAR; 6	TEX; 1	PHO; 28	HOM; 8			3rd	4029	
2020	GMS Racing	24	Chevy	DAY	LVS	CLT	ATL	HOM	POC	KEN	TEX; 7	KAN	KAN	MCH	DRC	DOV	GTW	DAR	RCH	BRI	LVS	TAL	KAN	TEX	MAR	PHO			83rd	0^{1}	
2025	Spire Motorsports	7	Chevy	DAY; 5	ATL																								85th	0^{1}	
2025	Spire Motorsports	07	Chevy			LVS; 11	HOM	MAR	BRI	CAR	TEX	KAN	NWS	CLT	NSH	MCH	POC	LRP	IRP	GLN	RCH	DAR	BRI	NHA	ROV	TAL	MAR	PHO	85th	0^{1}	
2026	Kaulig Racing	16	Ram	DAY; 22*	ATL; 10	STP; 12	DAR; 15	CAR; 12	BRI; 15	TEX; 27	GLN; 23	DOV; 10	CLT; 17	NSH; 31	MCH; 28	COR; 6	LRP; 14	NWS; 26	IRP; 18	RCH; 27	NHA; 9	BRI; 4	KAN; 11	CLT; 10	PHO; 20	TAL; 20	MAR; 34	HOM; 19	15th	496	
2027	Kaulig Racing	16	Ram	DAY	ATL	STP	DAR	BRI	TEX	KAN	NWS	CLT	NSS	POC	MCH	LRP	ATL	IRP	BRI	BGS	MSP	NHA	KAN	CLT	PHO	TAL	MAR	HOM			

^{*} Season still in progress
^{1} Ineligible for series points

=== ARCA Racing Series ===
(key) (Bold – Pole position awarded by qualifying time. Italics – Pole position earned by points standings or practice time. * – Most laps led.)

ARCA Racing Series results
Year	Team	No.	Make	1	2	3	4	5	6	7	8	9	10	11	12	13	14	15	16	17	18	19	20	ARSC	Pts	Ref
2014	Venturini Motorsports	66	Toyota	DAY	MOB	SLM	TAL	TOL; 18	NJE	POC	MCH		WIN; 6	CHI	IRP; 26	POC								28th	1055	
2014	Venturini Motorsports	55	Toyota									**ELK**; 3					BLN; 8	ISF	MAD	DSF	SLM; 8	KEN	KAN	28th	1055	
2015	HScott Motorsports	74	Chevy	DAY	MOB	NSH	SLM; 4	TAL	TOL	NJE	POC	MCH	CHI	WIN	IOW	IRP; 4	POC	BLN	ISF	DSF	SLM; 24	KEN	KAN	43rd	530	
2016	Braun Motorsports	74	Chevy	DAY	NSH	SLM; 2	TAL	TOL	NJE	POC; 7	MCH	MAD	WIN	IOW	IRP; 22	POC	BLN							35th	780	
2016	Mason Mitchell Motorsports	98	Chevy															ISF; 1	DSF	SLM	CHI	KEN	KAN	35th	780	
2017	MDM Motorsports	28	Toyota	DAY	NSH	SLM	TAL; 1	TOL	ELK	POC	MCH	MAD	IOW	IRP										35th	680	
2017	Mason Mitchell Motorsports	78	Chevy												POC; 1	WIN	ISF	ROA	DSF	SLM	CHI	KEN	KAN; 6	35th	680	

==== K&N Pro Series East ====
NASCAR K&N Pro Series East results
Year	Team	No.	Make	1	2	3	4	5	6	7	8	9	10	11	12	13	14	15	16	NKNPSEC	Pts	Ref
2014	Braun Racing	10	Chevy	NSM	DAY	BRI	GRE	RCH	IOW	BGS	FIF	LGY	NHA	COL; 23	IOW; 20	GLN	VIR	GRE	DOV; 7	33rd	82	
2015	HScott Motorsports with Justin Marks	5	Chevy	NSM; 21	GRE; 18	BRI; 9	IOW; 4	BGS; 3	LGY; 20	COL; 9	NHA; 8	IOW; 4	GLN; 3	MOT; 5	VIR; 5	RCH; 12	DOV; 6			6th	491	
2016	HScott Motorsports with Justin Marks	5	Chevy	NSM; 5	MOB; 9	GRE; 1	BRI; 4	VIR; 2	DOM; 2	STA; 4	**COL**; 1*	NHA; 3	IOW; 4	GLN; 2	GRE; 5	**NJM**; 2	**DOV**; 4			1st	580	

==== K&N Pro Series West ====
NASCAR K&N Pro Series West results
Year	Team	No.	Make	1	2	3	4	5	6	7	8	9	10	11	12	13	14	NKNPSWC	Pts	Ref
2014	Bob Wood	14	Chevy	PHO	IRW	S99	IOW	KCR	SON	SLS	CNS	IOW	EVG	KCR	MMP	AAS	PHO; 26	81st	18	
2015	HScott Motorsports with Justin Marks	05	Chevy	KCR	IRW	TUS	IOW	SHA	SON; 3	SLS	IOW	EVG	CNS	MER	AAS	**PHO**; 21*		36th	66	

=== CARS Super Late Model Tour ===
(key)

CARS Super Late Model Tour results
Year	Team	No.	Make	1	2	3	4	5	6	7	8	9	10	CSLMTC	Pts	Ref
2015	Nathan Dennis	99	Chevy	SNM	ROU	HCY	SNM	TCM	MMS; 24	ROU	CON	MYB	HCY	64th	9	

Sporting positions
Preceded by William Byron	NASCAR K&N Pro Series East Champion; 2016	Succeeded by Harrison Burton
