= 2025 Bass Pro Shops Night Race =

Race details
- Race 29 of 36 in the 2025 NASCAR Cup Series
- Date: September 13, 2025
- Location: Bristol Motor Speedway in Bristol, Tennessee
- Course: Permanent racing facility
- Course length: 0.533 miles (0.858 km)
- Distance: 500 laps, 266.5 mi (428.890 km)
- Average speed: 69.686 miles per hour (112.149 km/h)

Pole position
Driver	A. J. Allmendinger	Kaulig Racing
- Time: 15.117

Most laps led
Driver	Ty Gibbs	Joe Gibbs Racing
- Laps: 201

Fastest lap
Driver	A. J. Allmendinger	Kaulig Racing
- Time: 15.549

Winner
No. 20	Christopher Bell	Joe Gibbs Racing

Television in the United States
- Network: USA
- Announcers: Leigh Diffey, Jeff Burton and Steve Letarte
- Nielsen ratings: 0.79 (1.536 million)

Radio in the United States
- Radio: PRN
- Booth announcers: Brad Gillie and Mark Garrow
- Turn announcers: Rob Albright (Backstretch)

The 2025 Bass Pro Shops Night Race was a NASCAR Cup Series race held on September 13, 2025, at Bristol Motor Speedway in Bristol, Tennessee on the 0.533-mile (0.858 km) speedway. It was the 29th race of the 2025 NASCAR Cup Series season, the third race of the playoffs, and the final race in the Round of 16.

Christopher Bell won the race. Brad Keselowski finished 2nd, and Zane Smith finished 3rd. Ryan Blaney and Joey Logano rounded out the top five, and Corey Heim, Carson Hocevar, Alex Bowman, Chase Briscoe, and Ty Gibbs rounded out the top ten.

Following the race, Alex Bowman, Austin Dillon, Shane van Gisbergen, and Josh Berry were all eliminated from the playoffs.

== Report ==
=== Background ===
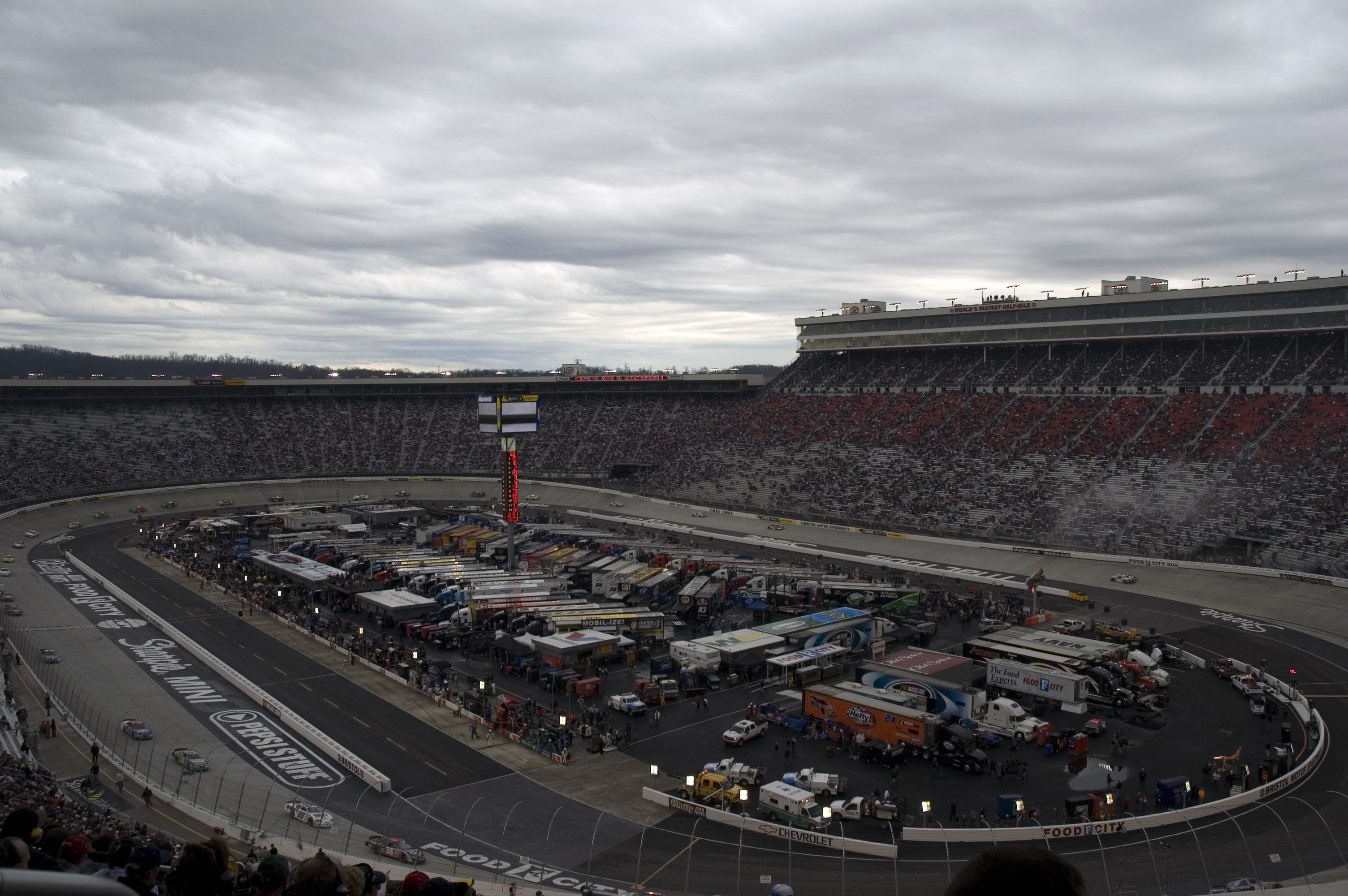
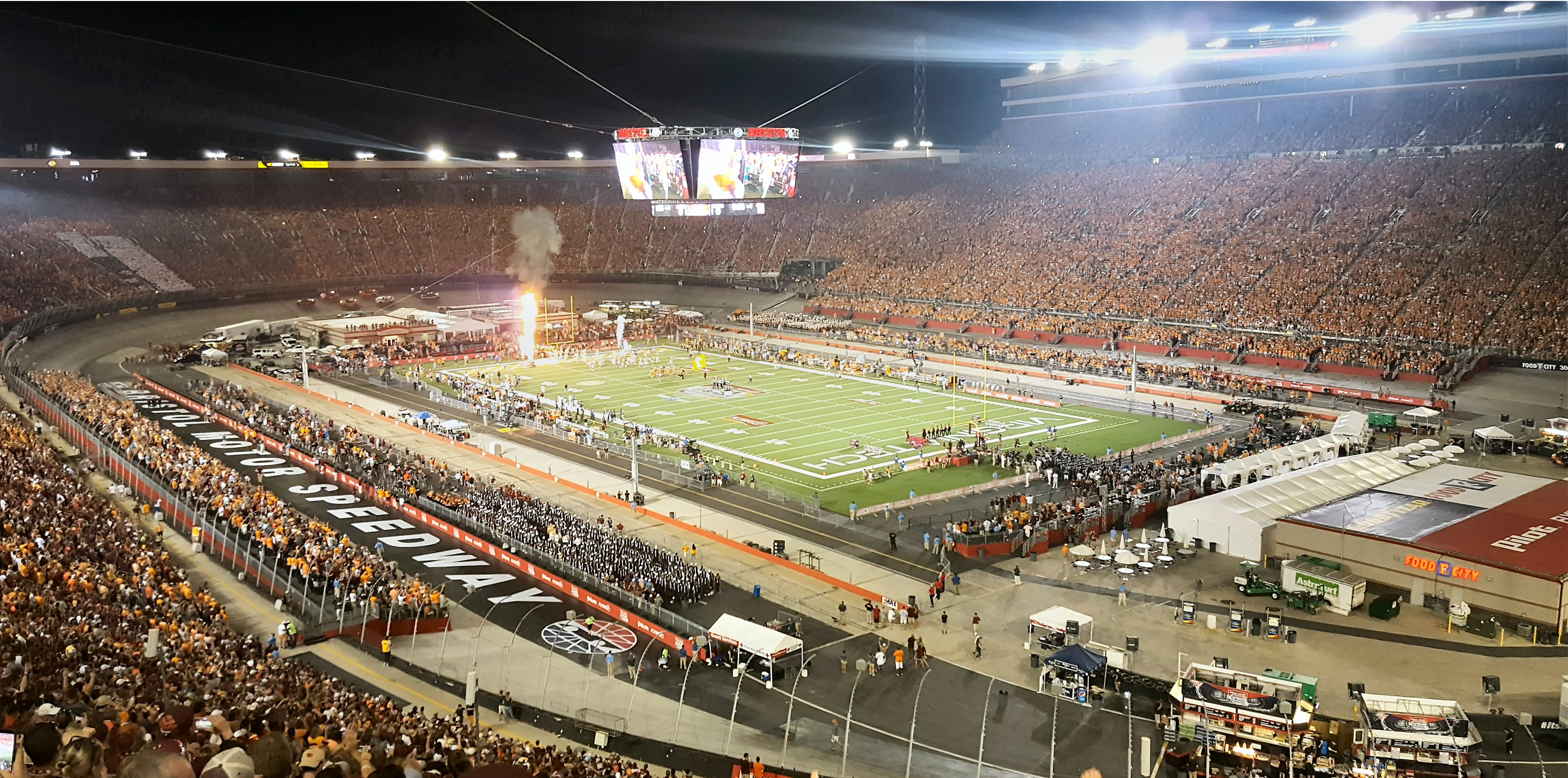
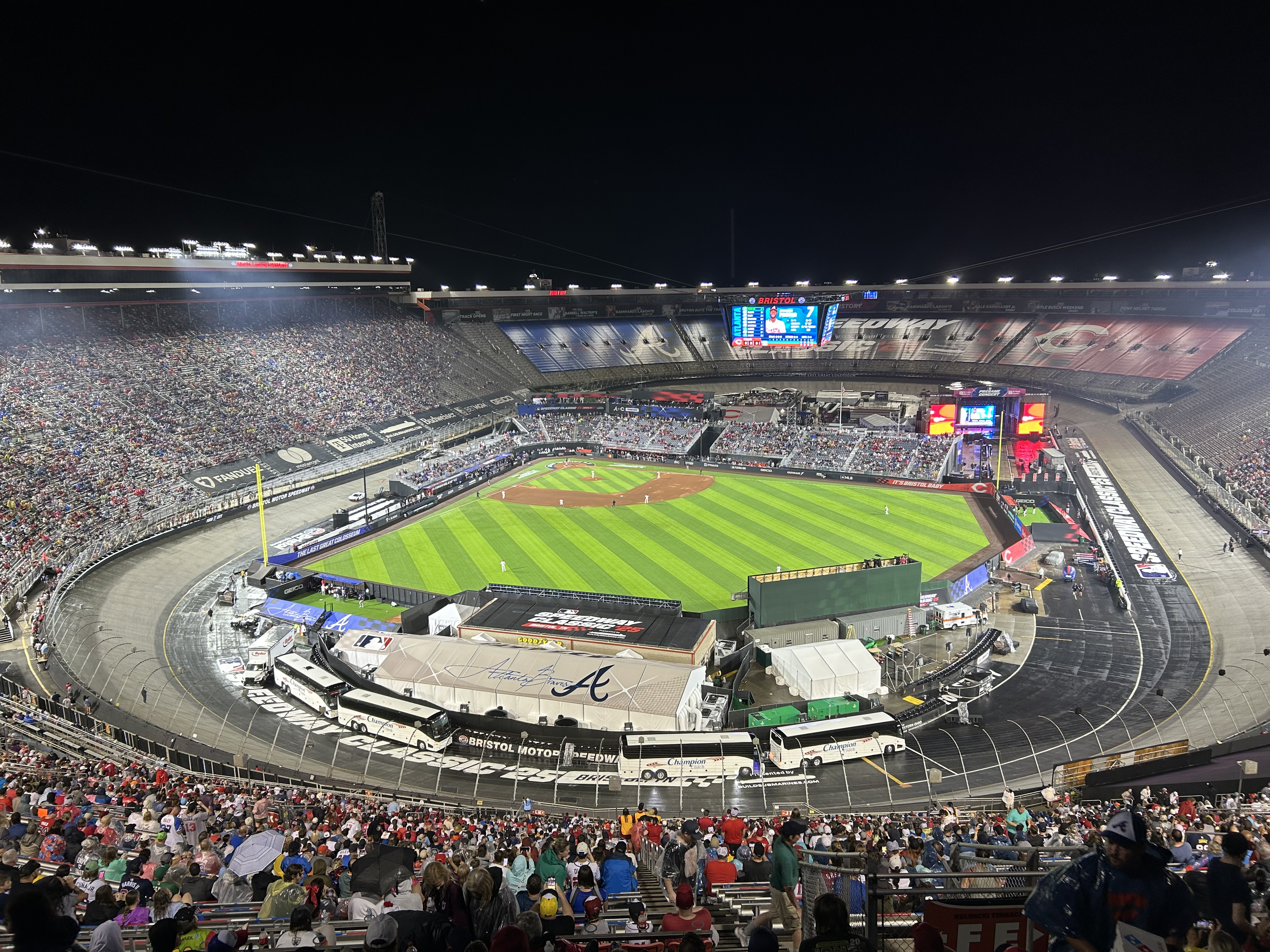
The Track (left) the Battle at Bristol (center) and the MLB Speedway Classic (right), are all events previously held at Bristol Motor Speedway.

The Bristol Motor Speedway, formerly known as Bristol International Raceway and Bristol Raceway, is a NASCAR short track venue located in Bristol, Tennessee. Constructed in 1960, it held its first NASCAR race on July 30, 1961. Despite its short length, Bristol is among the most popular tracks on the NASCAR schedule because of its distinct features, which include extraordinarily steep banking, an all concrete surface, two pit roads, and stadium-like seating. It has also been named one of the loudest NASCAR tracks.

Besides holding racing events, the track has hosted the Battle at Bristol, a college football game between the Tennessee Volunteers and Virginia Tech Hokies on September 10, 2016 and the MLB Speedway Classic, an MLB baseball game between the Atlanta Braves and the Cincinnati Reds from August 2-3, 2025.

==== Entry list ====
- (R) denotes rookie driver.
- (P) denotes playoff driver.
- (i) denotes driver who is ineligible for series driver points.

No.	Driver	Team	Manufacturer
1	Ross Chastain (P)	Trackhouse Racing	Chevrolet
2	Austin Cindric (P)	Team Penske	Ford
3	Austin Dillon (P)	Richard Childress Racing	Chevrolet
4	Noah Gragson	Front Row Motorsports	Ford
5	Kyle Larson (P)	Hendrick Motorsports	Chevrolet
6	Brad Keselowski	RFK Racing	Ford
7	Justin Haley	Spire Motorsports	Chevrolet
8	Kyle Busch	Richard Childress Racing	Chevrolet
9	Chase Elliott (P)	Hendrick Motorsports	Chevrolet
10	Ty Dillon	Kaulig Racing	Chevrolet
11	Denny Hamlin (P)	Joe Gibbs Racing	Toyota
12	Ryan Blaney (P)	Team Penske	Ford
16	A. J. Allmendinger	Kaulig Racing	Chevrolet
17	Chris Buescher	RFK Racing	Ford
19	Chase Briscoe (P)	Joe Gibbs Racing	Toyota
20	Christopher Bell (P)	Joe Gibbs Racing	Toyota
21	Josh Berry (P)	Wood Brothers Racing	Ford
22	Joey Logano (P)	Team Penske	Ford
23	Bubba Wallace (P)	23XI Racing	Toyota
24	William Byron (P)	Hendrick Motorsports	Chevrolet
33	Austin Hill (i)	Richard Childress Racing	Chevrolet
34	Todd Gilliland	Front Row Motorsports	Ford
35	Riley Herbst (R)	23XI Racing	Toyota
38	Zane Smith	Front Row Motorsports	Ford
41	Cole Custer	Haas Factory Team	Ford
42	John Hunter Nemechek	Legacy Motor Club	Toyota
43	Erik Jones	Legacy Motor Club	Toyota
45	Tyler Reddick (P)	23XI Racing	Toyota
47	Ricky Stenhouse Jr.	Hyak Motorsports	Chevrolet
48	Alex Bowman (P)	Hendrick Motorsports	Chevrolet
51	Cody Ware	Rick Ware Racing	Ford
54	Ty Gibbs	Joe Gibbs Racing	Toyota
60	Ryan Preece	RFK Racing	Ford
66	Chad Finchum	Garage 66	Ford
67	Corey Heim (i)	23XI Racing	Toyota
71	Michael McDowell	Spire Motorsports	Chevrolet
77	Carson Hocevar	Spire Motorsports	Chevrolet
88	Shane van Gisbergen (P) (R)	Trackhouse Racing	Chevrolet
99	Daniel Suárez	Trackhouse Racing	Chevrolet
Official entry list

== Practice ==
Both Justin Haley & Ryan Blaney were the fastest in the practice session with a time of 15.307 seconds and a speed of 125.354 mph (201.738 km/h).

=== Practice results ===
Pos	No.	Driver	Team	Manufacturer	Time	Speed
1	7	Justin Haley	Spire Motorsports	Chevrolet	15.307	125.354
1	12	Ryan Blaney (P)	Team Penske	Ford	15.307	125.354
3	77	Carson Hocevar	Spire Motorsports	Chevrolet	15.309	125.338
Official practice results

== Qualifying ==
A. J. Allmendinger scored the pole for the race with a time of 15.117 and a speed of 126.930 mph (204.274 km/h).

=== Qualifying results ===
Pos	No.	Driver	Team	Manufacturer	Time	Speed
1	16	A. J. Allmendinger	Kaulig Racing	Chevrolet	15.117	126.930
2	12	Ryan Blaney (P)	Team Penske	Ford	15.120	126.905
3	2	Austin Cindric (P)	Team Penske	Ford	15.132	126.804
4	54	Ty Gibbs	Joe Gibbs Racing	Toyota	15.142	126.720
5	5	Kyle Larson (P)	Hendrick Motorsports	Chevrolet	15.148	126.670
6	11	Denny Hamlin (P)	Joe Gibbs Racing	Toyota	15.191	126.312
7	24	William Byron (P)	Hendrick Motorsports	Chevrolet	15.206	126.187
8	23	Bubba Wallace (P)	23XI Racing	Toyota	15.208	126.170
9	20	Christopher Bell (P)	Joe Gibbs Racing	Toyota	15.214	126.121
10	21	Josh Berry (P)	Wood Brothers Racing	Ford	15.214	126.121
11	47	Ricky Stenhouse Jr.	Hyak Motorsports	Chevrolet	15.220	126.071
12	77	Carson Hocevar	Spire Motorsports	Chevrolet	15.222	126.054
13	1	Ross Chastain (P)	Trackhouse Racing	Chevrolet	15.239	125.914
14	45	Tyler Reddick (P)	23XI Racing	Toyota	15.246	125.856
15	48	Alex Bowman (P)	Hendrick Motorsports	Chevrolet	15.258	125.757
16	9	Chase Elliott (P)	Hendrick Motorsports	Chevrolet	15.269	125.650
17	7	Justin Haley	Spire Motorsports	Chevrolet	15.272	125.642
18	6	Brad Keselowski	RFK Racing	Ford	15.273	125.633
19	42	John Hunter Nemechek	Legacy Motor Club	Toyota	15.273	125.633
20	60	Ryan Preece	RFK Racing	Ford	15.281	125.568
21	17	Chris Buescher	RFK Racing	Ford	15.290	125.494
22	22	Joey Logano (P)	Team Penske	Ford	15.298	125.428
23	3	Austin Dillon (P)	Richard Childress Racing	Chevrolet	15.332	125.150
24	38	Zane Smith	Front Row Motorsports	Ford	15.344	125.052
25	71	Michael McDowell	Spire Motorsports	Chevrolet	15.361	124.914
26	41	Cole Custer	Haas Factory Team	Ford	15.375	124.800
27	43	Erik Jones	Legacy Motor Club	Toyota	15.388	124.695
28	88	Shane van Gisbergen (P) (R)	Trackhouse Racing	Chevrolet	15.396	124.630
29	35	Riley Herbst (R)	23XI Racing	Toyota	15.397	124.622
30	4	Noah Gragson	Front Row Motorsports	Ford	15.402	124.581
31	19	Chase Briscoe (P)	Joe Gibbs Racing	Toyota	15.431	124.347
32	8	Kyle Busch	Richard Childress Racing	Chevrolet	15.432	124.339
33	33	Austin Hill (i)	Richard Childress Racing	Chevrolet	15.480	123.953
34	51	Cody Ware	Rick Ware Racing	Ford	15.600	123.000
35	99	Daniel Suárez	Trackhouse Racing	Chevrolet	15.612	122.905
36	34	Todd Gilliland	Front Row Motorsports	Ford	15.631	122.756
37	10	Ty Dillon	Kaulig Racing	Chevrolet	15.657	122.552
38	67	Corey Heim (i)	23XI Racing	Toyota	15.673	122.427
39	66	Chad Finchum	Garage 66	Ford	16.167	119.552
Official qualifying results

== Race ==
=== Race results ===
==== Stage results ====
Stage One Laps: 125

Pos	No	Driver	Team	Manufacturer	Points
1	12	Ryan Blaney (P)	Team Penske	Ford	10
2	54	Ty Gibbs	Joe Gibbs Racing	Toyota	9
3	24	William Byron (P)	Hendrick Motorsports	Chevrolet	8
4	23	Bubba Wallace (P)	23XI Racing	Toyota	7
5	38	Zane Smith	Front Row Motorsports	Ford	6
6	17	Chris Buescher	RFK Racing	Ford	5
7	16	A. J. Allmendinger	Kaulig Racing	Chevrolet	4
8	6	Brad Keselowski	RFK Racing	Ford	3
9	42	John Hunter Nemechek	Legacy Motor Club	Toyota	2
10	47	Ricky Stenhouse Jr.	Hyak Motorsports	Chevrolet	1
Official stage one results

Stage Two Laps: 125

Pos	No	Driver	Team	Manufacturer	Points
1	54	Ty Gibbs	Joe Gibbs Racing	Toyota	10
2	12	Ryan Blaney (P)	Team Penske	Ford	9
3	48	Alex Bowman (P)	Hendrick Motorsports	Chevrolet	8
4	6	Brad Keselowski	RFK Racing	Ford	7
5	77	Carson Hocevar	Spire Motorsports	Chevrolet	6
6	2	Austin Cindric (P)	Team Penske	Ford	5
7	17	Chris Buescher	RFK Racing	Ford	4
8	23	Bubba Wallace (P)	23XI Racing	Toyota	3
9	38	Zane Smith	Front Row Motorsports	Ford	2
10	11	Denny Hamlin (P)	Joe Gibbs Racing	Toyota	1
Official stage two results

=== Final Stage results ===
Stage Three Laps: 250

Pos	Grid	No	Driver	Team	Manufacturer	Laps	Points
1	9	20	Christopher Bell (P)	Joe Gibbs Racing	Toyota	500	40
2	18	6	Brad Keselowski	RFK Racing	Ford	500	45
3	24	38	Zane Smith	Front Row Motorsports	Ford	500	37
4	2	12	Ryan Blaney (P)	Team Penske	Ford	500	52
5	22	22	Joey Logano (P)	Team Penske	Ford	500	32
6	38	67	Corey Heim (i)	23XI Racing	Toyota	500	0
7	12	77	Carson Hocevar	Spire Motorsports	Chevrolet	500	36
8	15	48	Alex Bowman (P)	Hendrick Motorsports	Chevrolet	500	37
9	31	19	Chase Briscoe (P)	Joe Gibbs Racing	Toyota	500	28
10	4	54	Ty Gibbs	Joe Gibbs Racing	Toyota	500	46
11	21	17	Chris Buescher	RFK Racing	Ford	500	35
12	7	24	William Byron (P)	Hendrick Motorsports	Chevrolet	500	33
13	17	7	Justin Haley	Spire Motorsports	Chevrolet	500	24
14	19	42	John Hunter Nemechek	Legacy Motor Club	Toyota	499	25
15	14	45	Tyler Reddick (P)	23XI Racing	Chevrolet	499	22
16	32	8	Kyle Busch	Richard Childress Racing	Chevrolet	499	21
17	25	71	Michael McDowell	Spire Motorsports	Chevrolet	499	20
18	39	35	Riley Herbst (R)	23XI Racing	Toyota	499	19
19	13	1	Ross Chastain (P)	Trackhouse Racing	Chevrolet	499	18
20	27	43	Erik Jones	Legacy Motor Club	Toyota	499	17
21	20	60	Ryan Preece	RFK Racing	Ford	499	16
22	11	47	Ricky Stenhouse Jr.	Hyak Motorsports	Chevrolet	499	16
23	30	4	Noah Gragson	Front Row Motorsports	Ford	498	14
24	36	34	Todd Gilliland	Front Row Motorsports	Ford	498	13
25	33	33	Austin Hill (i)	Richard Childress Racing	Chevrolet	497	0
26	28	88	Shane van Gisbergen (P) (R)	Trackhouse Racing	Chevrolet	497	11
27	37	10	Ty Dillon	Kaulig Racing	Chevrolet	497	10
28	23	3	Austin Dillon (P)	Richard Childress Racing	Chevrolet	496	9
29	34	51	Cody Ware	Rick Ware Racing	Ford	496	8
30	3	2	Austin Cindric (P)	Team Penske	Ford	496	12
31	6	11	Denny Hamlin (P)	Joe Gibbs Racing	Toyota	495	6
32	5	5	Kyle Larson (P)	Hendrick Motorsports	Chevrolet	495	5
33	26	41	Cole Custer	Haas Factory Team	Ford	488	4
34	8	23	Bubba Wallace (P)	23XI Racing	Toyota	487	13
35	39	66	Chad Finchum	Garage 66	Ford	458	2
36	1	16	A. J. Allmendinger	Kaulig Racing	Chevrolet	408	6
37	35	99	Daniel Suárez	Trackhouse Racing	Chevrolet	364	1
38	16	9	Chase Elliott (P)	Hendrick Motorsports	Chevrolet	311	1
39	10	21	Josh Berry (P)	Wood Brothers Racing	Ford	75	1
Official race results

=== Race statistics ===
- Lead changes: 36 among 14 different drivers
- Cautions/Laps: 14 for 137 laps
- Red flags: 0
- Time of race: 3 hours, 48 minutes and 10 seconds
- Average speed: 69.686 miles per hour (112.149 km/h)

== Media ==
=== Television ===
USA covered the race on the television side. Leigh Diffey, Jeff Burton and Steve Letarte called the race from the broadcast booth. Trevor Bayne, Dave Burns, Kim Coon, and Marty Snider handled the pit road duties from pit lane.

USA
Booth announcers	Pit reporters
Lap-by-lap: Leigh Diffey; Color-commentator: Jeff Burton; Color-commentator: Steve Letarte	Trevor Bayne; Dave Burns; Kim Coon; Marty Snider

=== Radio ===
PRN had the radio call for the race, which was also simulcast on Sirius XM NASCAR Radio. Brad Gillie and Mark Garrow called the race from the booth when the field races down the frontstretch. Rob Albright called the race when the field races down the backstretch. Andrew Kurland, Brett McMillan, Doug Turnbull and Wendy Venturini handled the duties on pit lane.

PRN
Booth announcers	Turn announcers	Pit reporters
Lead announcer: Brad Gillie; Announcer: Mark Garrow	Backstretch: Rob Albright	Andrew Kurland; Brett McMillan; Doug Turnbull; Wendy Venturini

== Standings after the race ==
Drivers' Championship standings

	Pos	Driver	Points
	1	Denny Hamlin	3,034
1	2	Kyle Larson	3,032 (–2)
3	3	William Byron	3,032 (–2)
4	4	Christopher Bell	3,028 (–6)
	5	Ryan Blaney	3,027 (–7)
4	6	Chase Briscoe	3,018 (–16)
2	7	Chase Elliott	3,013 (–21)
4	8	Bubba Wallace	3,009 (–25)
3	9	Austin Cindric	3,008 (–26)
1	10	Ross Chastain	3,007 (–27)
1	11	Joey Logano	3,007 (–27)
5	12	Tyler Reddick	3,006 (–28)
2	13	Alex Bowman	2,056 (–978)
1	14	Austin Dillon	2,052 (–982)
1	15	Shane van Gisbergen	2,050 (–984)
	16	Josh Berry	2,010 (–1,024)
Official driver's standings

Manufacturers' Championship standings

Pos	Manufacturer	Points
1	Chevrolet	1,056
2	Toyota	1,040 (–16)
3	Ford	967 (–89)

- Note: Only the first 16 positions are included for the driver standings.

Previous race: 2025 Enjoy Illinois 300	NASCAR Cup Series; 2025 season	Next race: 2025 Mobil 1 301
