= 2024 Enjoy Illinois 300 =

NASCAR Cup Series race

Race details
- Race 15 of 36 in the 2024 NASCAR Cup Series
- Date: June 2, 2024
- Location: World Wide Technology Raceway in Madison, Illinois
- Course: Permanent racing facility
- Course length: 1.25 miles (2.01 km)
- Distance: 240 laps, 300 mi (480 km)
- Average speed: 133.889 miles per hour (215.473 km/h)

Pole position
Driver	Michael McDowell	Front Row Motorsports
- Time: 32.468

Most laps led
Driver	Christopher Bell	Joe Gibbs Racing
- Laps: 80

Winner
No. 2	Austin Cindric	Team Penske

Television in the United States
- Network: FS1
- Announcers: Mike Joy, Clint Bowyer, and Kevin Harvick
- Nielsen ratings: 2.46 million

Radio in the United States
- Radio: MRN
- Booth announcers: Alex Hayden, Jeff Striegle and Rusty Wallace
- Turn announcers: Dave Moody (1 & 2) and Kurt Becker (3 & 4)

The 2024 Enjoy Illinois 300 was a NASCAR Cup Series race held on June 2, 2024, at World Wide Technology Raceway in Madison, Illinois. Contested over 240 laps on the 1.25-mile (2.01 km) paved oval motor racing track, it was the 15th race of the 2024 NASCAR Cup Series season. Austin Cindric won the race. Denny Hamlin finished 2nd, and Brad Keselowski finished 3rd. Tyler Reddick and Joey Logano rounded out the top five, and Austin Dillon, Christopher Bell, Carson Hocevar, Justin Haley, and Kyle Larson rounded out the top ten.

== Report ==
=== Background ===
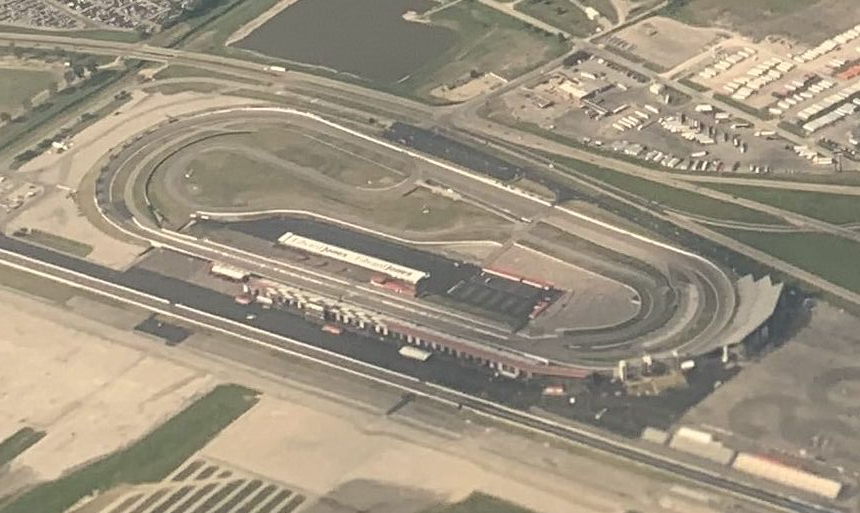
World Wide Technology Raceway, the track where the race was held.

World Wide Technology Raceway (formerly Gateway International Raceway and Gateway Motorsports Park) is a motorsport racing facility in Madison, Illinois, just east of St. Louis, Missouri, United States, close to the Gateway Arch. It features a 1.25-mile (2 kilometer) oval that hosts the NASCAR Cup Series, NASCAR Craftsman Truck Series, and the NTT IndyCar Series, a 1.6-mile (2.6 km) infield road course used by the SCCA, Porsche Club of America, and various car clubs, and a quarter-mile drag strip that hosts the annual NHRA Midwest Nationals event.

==== Entry list ====
- (R) denotes rookie driver.
- (i) denotes driver who is ineligible for series driver points.

No.	Driver	Team	Manufacturer
1	Ross Chastain	Trackhouse Racing	Chevrolet
2	Austin Cindric	Team Penske	Ford
3	Austin Dillon	Richard Childress Racing	Chevrolet
4	Josh Berry (R)	Stewart-Haas Racing	Ford
5	Kyle Larson	Hendrick Motorsports	Chevrolet
6	Brad Keselowski	RFK Racing	Ford
7	Corey LaJoie	Spire Motorsports	Chevrolet
8	Kyle Busch	Richard Childress Racing	Chevrolet
9	Chase Elliott	Hendrick Motorsports	Chevrolet
10	Noah Gragson	Stewart-Haas Racing	Ford
11	Denny Hamlin	Joe Gibbs Racing	Toyota
12	Ryan Blaney	Team Penske	Ford
14	Chase Briscoe	Stewart-Haas Racing	Ford
15	Cody Ware	Rick Ware Racing	Ford
16	Derek Kraus	Kaulig Racing	Chevrolet
17	Chris Buescher	RFK Racing	Ford
19	Martin Truex Jr.	Joe Gibbs Racing	Toyota
20	Christopher Bell	Joe Gibbs Racing	Toyota
21	Harrison Burton	Wood Brothers Racing	Ford
22	Joey Logano	Team Penske	Ford
23	Bubba Wallace	23XI Racing	Toyota
24	William Byron	Hendrick Motorsports	Chevrolet
31	Daniel Hemric	Kaulig Racing	Chevrolet
34	Michael McDowell	Front Row Motorsports	Ford
38	Todd Gilliland	Front Row Motorsports	Ford
41	Ryan Preece	Stewart-Haas Racing	Ford
42	John Hunter Nemechek	Legacy Motor Club	Toyota
43	Erik Jones	Legacy Motor Club	Toyota
45	Tyler Reddick	23XI Racing	Toyota
47	Ricky Stenhouse Jr.	JTG Daugherty Racing	Chevrolet
48	Alex Bowman	Hendrick Motorsports	Chevrolet
51	Justin Haley	Rick Ware Racing	Ford
54	Ty Gibbs	Joe Gibbs Racing	Toyota
71	Zane Smith (R)	Spire Motorsports	Chevrolet
77	Carson Hocevar (R)	Spire Motorsports	Chevrolet
99	Daniel Suárez	Trackhouse Racing	Chevrolet
Official entry list

== Practice ==
Joey Logano was the fastest in the practice session with a time of 32.603 seconds and a speed of 138.024 mph (222.128 km/h).

=== Practice results ===
Pos	No.	Driver	Team	Manufacturer	Time	Speed
1	22	Joey Logano	Team Penske	Ford	32.603	138.024
2	12	Ryan Blaney	Team Penske	Ford	32.604	138.020
3	54	Ty Gibbs	Joe Gibbs Racing	Toyota	32.627	137.923
Official practice results

== Qualifying ==
Michael McDowell scored the pole for the race with a time 32.468 of and a speed of 138.598 mph (223.052 km/h).

=== Qualifying results ===
Pos	No.	Driver	Team	Manufacturer	R1	R2
1	34	Michael McDowell	Front Row Motorsports	Ford	32.318	32.468
2	2	Austin Cindric	Team Penske	Ford	32.620	32.577
3	12	Ryan Blaney	Team Penske	Ford	32.663	32.613
4	20	Christopher Bell	Joe Gibbs Racing	Toyota	32.681	32.687
5	45	Tyler Reddick	23XI Racing	Toyota	32.657	32.707
6	11	Denny Hamlin	Joe Gibbs Racing	Toyota	32.582	32.726
7	6	Brad Keselowski	RFK Racing	Ford	32.673	32.753
8	23	Bubba Wallace	23XI Racing	Toyota	32.669	32.775
9	54	Ty Gibbs	Joe Gibbs Racing	Toyota	32.698	32.814
10	8	Kyle Busch	Richard Childress Racing	Chevrolet	32.704	32.842
11	24	William Byron	Hendrick Motorsports	Chevrolet	32.705	—
12	22	Joey Logano	Team Penske	Ford	32.774	—
13	5	Kyle Larson	Hendrick Motorsports	Chevrolet	32.734	—
14	48	Alex Bowman	Hendrick Motorsports	Chevrolet	32.822	—
15	7	Corey LaJoie	Spire Motorsports	Chevrolet	32.735	—
16	1	Ross Chastain	Trackhouse Racing	Chevrolet	32.897	—
17	9	Chase Elliott	Hendrick Motorsports	Chevrolet	32.742	—
18	3	Austin Dillon	Richard Childress Racing	Chevrolet	32.899	—
19	19	Martin Truex Jr.	Joe Gibbs Racing	Toyota	32.815	—
20	77	Carson Hocevar (R)	Spire Motorsports	Chevrolet	32.915	—
21	51	Justin Haley	Rick Ware Racing	Ford	32.817	—
22	43	Erik Jones	Legacy Motor Club	Toyota	32.971	—
23	14	Chase Briscoe	Stewart-Haas Racing	Ford	32.837	—
24	47	Ricky Stenhouse Jr.	JTG Daugherty Racing	Chevrolet	32.999	—
25	16	Derek Kraus	Kaulig Racing	Chevrolet	32.916	—
26	17	Chris Buescher	RFK Racing	Ford	33.051	—
27	10	Noah Gragson	Stewart-Haas Racing	Ford	32.932	—
28	31	Daniel Hemric	Kaulig Racing	Chevrolet	33.077	—
29	4	Josh Berry (R)	Stewart-Haas Racing	Ford	32.971	—
30	21	Harrison Burton	Wood Brothers Racing	Ford	33.165	—
31	99	Daniel Suárez	Trackhouse Racing	Chevrolet	32.985	—
32	41	Ryan Preece	Stewart-Haas Racing	Ford	33.225	—
33	42	John Hunter Nemechek	Legacy Motor Club	Toyota	33.013	—
34	15	Cody Ware	Rick Ware Racing	Ford	33.335	—
35	38	Todd Gilliland	Front Row Motorsports	Ford	33.021	—
36	71	Zane Smith (R)	Spire Motorsports	Chevrolet	33.420	—
Official qualifying results

== Race ==
=== The Final Lap ===
Ryan Blaney was leading the final lap of the race with his teammate Austin Cindric in 2nd, about to make it a Team Penske 1-2 finish, but Blaney ran out of gas, making Cindric lead the final lap and win the first points race for Team Penske, and Blaney falling back to finish in 24th. Cindric's win would mark his first win (and second in his career) since the 2022 Daytona 500.

=== Race results ===
==== Stage results ====
Stage One Laps: 45

Pos	No	Driver	Team	Manufacturer	Points
1	20	Christopher Bell	Joe Gibbs Racing	Toyota	10
2	34	Michael McDowell	Front Row Motorsports	Ford	9
3	12	Ryan Blaney	Team Penske	Ford	8
4	2	Austin Cindric	Team Penske	Ford	7
5	11	Denny Hamlin	Joe Gibbs Racing	Toyota	6
6	24	William Byron	Hendrick Motorsports	Chevrolet	5
7	54	Ty Gibbs	Joe Gibbs Racing	Toyota	4
8	45	Tyler Reddick	23XI Racing	Toyota	3
9	22	Joey Logano	Team Penske	Ford	2
10	9	Chase Elliott	Hendrick Motorsports	Chevrolet	1
Official stage one results

Stage Two Laps: 95

Pos	No	Driver	Team	Manufacturer	Points
1	20	Christopher Bell	Joe Gibbs Racing	Toyota	10
2	2	Austin Cindric	Team Penske	Ford	9
3	12	Ryan Blaney	Team Penske	Ford	8
4	9	Chase Elliott	Hendrick Motorsports	Chevrolet	7
5	6	Brad Keselowski	RFK Racing	Ford	6
6	22	Joey Logano	Team Penske	Ford	5
7	14	Chase Briscoe	Stewart-Haas Racing	Ford	4
8	77	Carson Hocevar (R)	Spire Motorsports	Chevrolet	3
9	3	Austin Dillon	Richard Childress Racing	Chevrolet	2
10	11	Denny Hamlin	Joe Gibbs Racing	Toyota	1
Official stage two results

=== Final Stage results ===
Stage Three Laps: 100

Pos	Grid	No	Driver	Team	Manufacturer	Laps	Points
1	2	2	Austin Cindric	Team Penske	Ford	240	56
2	6	11	Denny Hamlin	Joe Gibbs Racing	Toyota	240	42
3	7	6	Brad Keselowski	RFK Racing	Ford	240	40
4	5	45	Tyler Reddick	23XI Racing	Toyota	240	36
5	12	22	Joey Logano	Team Penske	Ford	240	39
6	18	3	Austin Dillon	Richard Childress Racing	Chevrolet	240	33
7	4	20	Christopher Bell	Joe Gibbs Racing	Toyota	240	50
8	20	77	Carson Hocevar (R)	Spire Motorsports	Chevrolet	240	32
9	21	51	Justin Haley	Rick Ware Racing	Ford	240	28
10	13	5	Kyle Larson	Hendrick Motorsports	Chevrolet	240	27
11	9	54	Ty Gibbs	Joe Gibbs Racing	Toyota	240	30
12	16	1	Ross Chastain	Trackhouse Racing	Chevrolet	240	25
13	17	9	Chase Elliott	Hendrick Motorsports	Chevrolet	240	32
14	26	17	Chris Buescher	RFK Racing	Ford	240	23
15	11	24	William Byron	Hendrick Motorsports	Chevrolet	240	27
16	35	38	Todd Gilliland	Front Row Motorsports	Ford	240	21
17	23	14	Chase Briscoe	Stewart-Haas Racing	Ford	240	24
18	28	31	Daniel Hemric	Kaulig Racing	Chevrolet	240	19
19	36	71	Zane Smith (R)	Spire Motorsports	Chevrolet	240	18
20	24	47	Ricky Stenhouse Jr.	JTG Daugherty Racing	Chevrolet	240	17
21	8	23	Bubba Wallace	23XI Racing	Toyota	240	16
22	27	10	Noah Gragson	Stewart-Haas Racing	Ford	240	15
23	31	99	Daniel Suárez	Trackhouse Racing	Chevrolet	240	14
24	3	12	Ryan Blaney	Team Penske	Ford	240	29
25	1	34	Michael McDowell	Front Row Motorsports	Ford	239	21
26	22	43	Erik Jones	Legacy Motor Club	Toyota	239	11
27	33	42	John Hunter Nemechek	Legacy Motor Club	Toyota	239	10
28	14	48	Alex Bowman	Hendrick Motorsports	Chevrolet	239	9
29	32	41	Ryan Preece	Stewart-Haas Racing	Ford	239	8
30	25	16	Derek Kraus	Kaulig Racing	Chevrolet	239	7
31	30	21	Harrison Burton	Wood Brothers Racing	Ford	239	6
32	15	7	Corey LaJoie	Spire Motorsports	Chevrolet	239	5
33	34	15	Cody Ware	Rick Ware Racing	Ford	238	4
34	19	19	Martin Truex Jr.	Joe Gibbs Racing	Toyota	237	3
35	10	8	Kyle Busch	Richard Childress Racing	Chevrolet	139	2
36	29	4	Josh Berry (R)	Stewart-Haas Racing	Ford	109	1
Official race results

=== Race statistics ===
- Lead changes: 16 among 10 different drivers
- Cautions/Laps: 5 for 32 laps
- Red flags: 0
- Time of race: 2 hours, 48 minutes, and 3 seconds
- Average speed: 133.889 miles per hour (215.473 km/h)

== Media ==
=== Television ===
Fox Sports covered the race on the television side. Mike Joy, Clint Bowyer and Kevin Harvick called the race from the broadcast booth. Jamie Little and Regan Smith handled the pit road for the television side. Larry McReynolds provided insight from the Fox Sports studio in Charlotte.

FS1
Booth announcers	Pit reporters	In-race analyst
Lap-by-lap: Mike Joy; Color-commentator: Clint Bowyer; Color-commentator: Kevin Harvick	Jamie Little; Regan Smith	Larry McReynolds

=== Radio ===
MRN has the radio call for the race and was also simulcasted on Sirius XM NASCAR Radio. Alex Hayden, Jeff Striegle, and NASCAR Hall of Famer Rusty Wallace called the race for MRN from the booth when the field races down the front straightaway. Dave Moody called the race from turns 1 & 2 while Kurt Becker called the race from turns 3 & 4. Pit Road for MRN was manned by lead pit reporter Steve Post, Brienne Pedigo and Kim Coon.

MRN Radio
Booth announcers	Turn announcers	Pit reporters
Lead announcer: Alex Hayden; Announcer: Jeff Striegle; Announcer: Rusty Wallace	Turns 1 & 2: Dave Moody; Turns 3 & 4: Kurt Becker	Steve Post; Brienne Pedigo; Kim Coon

== Standings after the race ==
Drivers' Championship standings

	Pos	Driver	Points
	1	Denny Hamlin	534
1	2	Kyle Larson	513 (–21)
1	3	Chase Elliott	507 (–27)
2	4	Martin Truex Jr.	490 (–44)
	5	William Byron	488 (–46)
	6	Tyler Reddick	473 (–61)
	7	Ty Gibbs	465 (–69)
3	8	Christopher Bell	437 (–97)
	9	Brad Keselowski	437 (–97)
2	10	Alex Bowman	417 (–117)
1	11	Ross Chastain	417 (–117)
	12	Ryan Blaney	405 (–129)
	13	Bubba Wallace	371 (–163)
1	14	Chris Buescher	368 (–166)
1	15	Chase Briscoe	358 (–176)
1	16	Joey Logano	354 (–180)
Official driver's standings

Manufacturers' Championship standings

	Pos	Manufacturer	Points
1	1	Toyota	545
1	2	Chevrolet	542 (–3)
	3	Ford	513 (–32)

- Note: Only the first 16 positions are included for the driver standings.
- . – Driver has clinched a position in the NASCAR Cup Series playoffs.

Previous race: 2024 Coca-Cola 600	NASCAR Cup Series; 2024 season	Next race: 2024 Toyota/Save Mart 350
