= 2022 Enjoy Illinois 300 =

NASCAR Cup Series race

Race details
- Race 15 of 36 in the 2022 NASCAR Cup Series
- The 2022 Enjoy Illinois 300 program cover
- Date: June 5, 2022
- Location: World Wide Technology Raceway in Madison, Illinois
- Course: Permanent racing facility
- Course length: 1.25 miles (2.01 km)
- Distance: 245 laps, 306.25 mi (490 km)
- Scheduled distance: 240 laps, 300 mi (480 km)
- Average speed: 97.965 miles per hour (157.659 km/h)

Pole position
Driver	Chase Briscoe	Stewart-Haas Racing
- Time: 32.544

Most laps led
Driver	Kyle Busch	Joe Gibbs Racing
- Laps: 66

Winner
No. 22	Joey Logano	Team Penske

Television in the United States
- Network: FS1
- Announcers: Mike Joy, Clint Bowyer, Michael Waltrip, and Kenny Wallace (Stage 2)

Radio in the United States
- Radio: MRN
- Booth announcers: Alex Hayden, Jeff Striegle and Rusty Wallace
- Turn announcers: Dave Moody (1 & 2) and Kurt Becker (3 & 4)

The 2022 Enjoy Illinois 300 was a NASCAR Cup Series race that was held on June 5, 2022, at World Wide Technology Raceway in Madison, Illinois. The 15th race of the 2022 NASCAR Cup Series season, it was contested over 245 laps – extended from 240 laps due to an overtime finish, on the 1.25-mile (2.01 km) paved oval motor racing track.

== Report ==
World Wide Technology Raceway, the track where the race was held.

=== Background ===
World Wide Technology Raceway (formerly Gateway International Raceway and Gateway Motorsports Park) is a motorsport racing facility in Madison, Illinois, just east of St. Louis, Missouri, United States, close to the Gateway Arch. It features a 1.25-mile (2 kilometer) oval that hosts the NASCAR Cup Series, NASCAR Camping World Truck Series, and the NTT IndyCar Series, a 1.6-mile (2.6 km) infield road course used by the SCCA, Porsche Club of America, and various car clubs, and a quarter-mile drag strip that hosts the annual NHRA Midwest Nationals event.

On September 15, 2021, it was announced WWT Raceway at Gateway would be added to the NASCAR Cup Series schedule for the first time for the 2022 season.

==== Entry list ====
- (R) denotes rookie driver.
- (i) denotes driver who is ineligible for series driver points.

No.	Driver	Team	Manufacturer
1	Ross Chastain	Trackhouse Racing Team	Chevrolet
2	Austin Cindric (R)	Team Penske	Ford
3	Austin Dillon	Richard Childress Racing	Chevrolet
4	Kevin Harvick	Stewart-Haas Racing	Ford
5	Kyle Larson	Hendrick Motorsports	Chevrolet
6	Brad Keselowski	RFK Racing	Ford
7	Corey LaJoie	Spire Motorsports	Chevrolet
8	Tyler Reddick	Richard Childress Racing	Chevrolet
9	Chase Elliott	Hendrick Motorsports	Chevrolet
10	Aric Almirola	Stewart-Haas Racing	Ford
11	Denny Hamlin	Joe Gibbs Racing	Toyota
12	Ryan Blaney	Team Penske	Ford
14	Chase Briscoe	Stewart-Haas Racing	Ford
15	Parker Kligerman (i)	Rick Ware Racing	Ford
16	A. J. Allmendinger (i) (Note: Ben Rhodes practiced and qualified the No. 16 for A. J. Allmendinger, who was in Portland for the Xfinity race.)	Kaulig Racing	Chevrolet
17	Zane Smith (i) (Note: Zane Smith fill in the No.17 for Chris Buescher, after RFK Racing announces that Buescher would miss the race due to being tested for COVID-19 few days priors.)	RFK Racing	Ford
18	Kyle Busch	Joe Gibbs Racing	Toyota
19	Martin Truex Jr.	Joe Gibbs Racing	Toyota
20	Christopher Bell	Joe Gibbs Racing	Toyota
21	Harrison Burton (R)	Wood Brothers Racing	Ford
22	Joey Logano	Team Penske	Ford
23	Bubba Wallace	23XI Racing	Toyota
24	William Byron	Hendrick Motorsports	Chevrolet
31	Justin Haley	Kaulig Racing	Chevrolet
34	Michael McDowell	Front Row Motorsports	Ford
38	Todd Gilliland (R)	Front Row Motorsports	Ford
41	Cole Custer	Stewart-Haas Racing	Ford
42	Ty Dillon	Petty GMS Motorsports	Chevrolet
43	Erik Jones	Petty GMS Motorsports	Chevrolet
45	Kurt Busch	23XI Racing	Toyota
47	Ricky Stenhouse Jr.	JTG Daugherty Racing	Chevrolet
48	Alex Bowman	Hendrick Motorsports	Chevrolet
51	Cody Ware	Rick Ware Racing	Ford
77	Josh Bilicki (i)	Spire Motorsports	Chevrolet
78	B. J. McLeod	Live Fast Motorsports	Ford
99	Daniel Suárez	Trackhouse Racing Team	Chevrolet
Official entry list

== Practice ==
Joey Logano was the fastest in the practice session with a time of 32.906 seconds and a speed of 136.753 mph (220.083 km/h).

=== Practice results ===
Pos	No.	Driver	Team	Manufacturer	Time	Speed
1	22	Joey Logano	Team Penske	Ford	32.906	136.753
2	12	Ryan Blaney	Team Penske	Ford	33.025	136.260
3	2	Austin Cindric (R)	Team Penske	Ford	33.063	136.104
Official practice results

== Qualifying ==
Chase Briscoe scored the pole for the race with a time of 32.544 and a speed of 138.274 mph (222.530 km/h).

=== Qualifying results ===
Pos	No.	Driver	Team	Manufacturer	R1	R2
1	14	Chase Briscoe	Stewart-Haas Racing	Ford	32.528	32.544
2	2	Austin Cindric (R)	Team Penske	Ford	32.797	32.662
3	20	Christopher Bell	Joe Gibbs Racing	Toyota	32.703	32.713
4	8	Tyler Reddick	Richard Childress Racing	Chevrolet	32.656	32.724
5	12	Ryan Blaney	Team Penske	Ford	32.719	32.735
6	11	Denny Hamlin	Joe Gibbs Racing	Toyota	32.762	32.760
7	22	Joey Logano	Team Penske	Ford	32.605	32.820
8	10	Aric Almirola	Stewart-Haas Racing	Ford	32.814	32.820
9	21	Harrison Burton (R)	Wood Brothers Racing	Ford	32.877	32.828
10	1	Ross Chastain	Trackhouse Racing Team	Chevrolet	32.904	32.870
11	45	Kurt Busch	23XI Racing	Toyota	32.803	—
12	18	Kyle Busch	Joe Gibbs Racing	Toyota	32.827	—
13	19	Martin Truex Jr.	Joe Gibbs Racing	Toyota	32.868	—
14	41	Cole Custer	Stewart-Haas Racing	Ford	32.932	—
15	5	Kyle Larson	Hendrick Motorsports	Chevrolet	32.939	—
16	9	Chase Elliott	Hendrick Motorsports	Chevrolet	32.941	—
17	34	Michael McDowell	Front Row Motorsports	Ford	32.960	—
18	23	Bubba Wallace	23XI Racing	Toyota	32.977	—
19	7	Corey LaJoie	Spire Motorsports	Chevrolet	32.997	—
20	4	Kevin Harvick	Stewart-Haas Racing	Ford	33.019	—
21	43	Erik Jones	Petty GMS Motorsports	Chevrolet	33.019	—
22	38	Todd Gilliland (R)	Front Row Motorsports	Ford	33.055	—
23	99	Daniel Suárez	Trackhouse Racing Team	Chevrolet	33.088	—
24	24	William Byron	Hendrick Motorsports	Chevrolet	33.112	—
25	48	Alex Bowman	Hendrick Motorsports	Chevrolet	33.150	—
26	42	Ty Dillon	Petty GMS Motorsports	Chevrolet	33.285	—
27	47	Ricky Stenhouse Jr.	JTG Daugherty Racing	Chevrolet	33.299	—
28	31	Justin Haley	Kaulig Racing	Chevrolet	33.339	—
29	3	Austin Dillon	Richard Childress Racing	Chevrolet	33.415	—
30	6	Brad Keselowski	RFK Racing	Ford	33.575	—
31	51	Cody Ware	Rick Ware Racing	Ford	33.625	—
32	17	Zane Smith (i)	RFK Racing	Ford	33.671	—
33	77	Josh Bilicki (i)	Spire Motorsports	Chevrolet	33.744	—
34	78	B. J. McLeod	Live Fast Motorsports	Ford	34.477	—
35	16	Ben Rhodes (i)	Kaulig Racing	Chevrolet	0.000	—
36	15	Parker Kligerman (i)	Rick Ware Racing	Ford	0.000	—
Official qualifying results

== Race ==
=== Stage Results ===
Stage One Laps: 45

Pos	No	Driver	Team	Manufacturer	Points
1	2	Austin Cindric (R)	Team Penske	Ford	10
2	12	Ryan Blaney	Team Penske	Ford	9
3	8	Tyler Reddick	Richard Childress Racing	Chevrolet	8
4	11	Denny Hamlin	Joe Gibbs Racing	Toyota	7
5	1	Ross Chastain	Trackhouse Racing Team	Chevrolet	6
6	10	Aric Almirola	Stewart-Haas Racing	Ford	5
7	22	Joey Logano	Team Penske	Ford	4
8	18	Kyle Busch	Joe Gibbs Racing	Toyota	3
9	9	Chase Elliott	Hendrick Motorsports	Chevrolet	2
10	20	Christopher Bell	Joe Gibbs Racing	Toyota	1
Official stage one results

Stage Two Laps: 95

Pos	No	Driver	Team	Manufacturer	Points
1	45	Kurt Busch	23XI Racing	Toyota	10
2	19	Martin Truex Jr.	Joe Gibbs Racing	Toyota	9
3	18	Kyle Busch	Joe Gibbs Racing	Toyota	8
4	5	Kyle Larson	Hendrick Motorsports	Chevrolet	7
5	10	Aric Almirola	Stewart-Haas Racing	Ford	6
6	20	Christopher Bell	Joe Gibbs Racing	Toyota	5
7	99	Daniel Suárez	Trackhouse Racing Team	Chevrolet	4
8	41	Cole Custer	Stewart-Haas Racing	Ford	3
9	43	Erik Jones	Petty GMS Motorsports	Chevrolet	2
10	12	Ryan Blaney	Team Penske	Ford	1
Official stage two results

=== Final Stage Results ===
Stage Three Laps: 100

Pos	Grid	No	Driver	Team	Manufacturer	Laps	Points
1	7	22	Joey Logano	Team Penske	Ford	245	44
2	12	18	Kyle Busch	Joe Gibbs Racing	Toyota	245	46
3	11	45	Kurt Busch	23XI Racing	Toyota	245	44
4	5	12	Ryan Blaney	Team Penske	Ford	245	43
5	8	10	Aric Almirola	Stewart-Haas Racing	Ford	245	43
6	13	19	Martin Truex Jr.	Joe Gibbs Racing	Toyota	245	40
7	21	43	Erik Jones	Petty GMS Motorsports	Chevrolet	245	32
8	10	1	Ross Chastain	Trackhouse Racing Team	Chevrolet	245	35
9	3	20	Christopher Bell	Joe Gibbs Racing	Toyota	245	34
10	35	16	A. J. Allmendinger (i)	Kaulig Racing	Chevrolet	245	0
11	2	2	Austin Cindric (R)	Team Penske	Ford	245	36
12	15	5	Kyle Larson	Hendrick Motorsports	Chevrolet	245	32
13	25	48	Alex Bowman	Hendrick Motorsports	Chevrolet	245	24
14	28	31	Justin Haley	Kaulig Racing	Chevrolet	245	23
15	29	3	Austin Dillon	Richard Childress Racing	Chevrolet	245	22
16	4	8	Tyler Reddick	Richard Childress Racing	Chevrolet	245	29
17	32	17	Zane Smith (i)	RFK Racing	Ford	245	0
18	17	34	Michael McDowell	Front Row Motorsports	Ford	245	19
19	24	24	William Byron	Hendrick Motorsports	Chevrolet	245	18
20	30	6	Brad Keselowski	RFK Racing	Ford	245	17
21	16	9	Chase Elliott	Hendrick Motorsports	Chevrolet	245	18
22	22	38	Todd Gililand (R)	Front Row Motorsports	Ford	245	15
23	23	99	Daniel Suárez	Trackhouse Racing Team	Chevrolet	245	18
24	1	14	Chase Briscoe	Stewart-Haas Racing	Ford	245	13
25	9	21	Harrison Burton (R)	Wood Brothers Racing	Ford	245	12
26	18	23	Bubba Wallace	23XI Racing	Toyota	245	11
27	26	42	Ty Dillon	Petty GMS Motorsports	Chevrolet	245	10
28	33	77	Josh Bilicki (i)	Spire Motorsports	Chevrolet	245	0
29	14	41	Cole Custer	Stewart-Haas Racing	Ford	245	11
30	34	78	B. J. McLeod	Live Fast Motorsports	Ford	245	7
31	36	15	Parker Kligerman (i)	Rick Ware Racing	Ford	245	0
32	27	47	Ricky Stenhouse Jr.	JTG Daugherty Racing	Chevrolet	241	5
33	20	4	Kevin Harvick	Stewart-Haas Racing	Ford	235	4
34	6	11	Denny Hamlin	Joe Gibbs Racing	Toyota	234	10
35	31	51	Cody Ware	Rick Ware Racing	Ford	166	2
36	19	7	Corey LaJoie	Spire Motorsports	Chevrolet	72	1
Official race results

=== Race statistics ===
- Lead changes: 12 among 9 different drivers
- Cautions/Laps: 10 for 53
- Red flags: 0
- Time of race: 3 hours, 7 minutes and 34 seconds
- Average speed: 97.965 miles per hour (157.659 km/h)

== Media ==
=== Television ===
Fox Sports covered the race on the television side. Mike Joy, Clint Bowyer, and Michael Waltrip called the race from the broadcast booth, with Kenny Wallace joining for Stage 2. Jamie Little and Regan Smith handled pit road for the television side, and Larry McReynolds provided insight from the Fox Sports studio in Charlotte. On the drive to his dealerships in Emporia, Kansas, Bowyer was involved that night in fatal crash where his car struck an impaired motorist in Osage Beach, Missouri that evening. Because of an investigation into the incident, Bowyer was on leave for legal issues and did not make the trip to Sonoma for the ensuing week's race.

FS1
Booth announcers	Pit reporters	In-race analyst
Lap-by-lap: Mike Joy; Color-commentator: Clint Bowyer; Color-commentator: Michael Waltrip; Color-commentator: Kenny Wallace (Stage 2)	Jamie Little; Regan Smith	Larry McReynolds

=== Radio ===
MRN had the radio call for the race and was simulcasted on Sirius XM NASCAR Radio. Alex Hayden, Jeff Striegle, and Rusty Wallace called the race for MRN from the booth when the field raced down the front straightaway. Dave Moody called the race from turns 1 & 2 while Kurt Becker called the race from turns 3 & 4. Pit Road for MRN was manned by Steve Post Brienne Pedigo and Chris Wilner.

MRN Radio
Booth announcers	Turn announcers	Pit reporters
Lead announcer: Alex Hayden; Announcer: Jeff Striegle; Announcer: Rusty Wallace	Turns 1 & 2: Dave Moody; Turns 3 & 4: Kurt Becker	Chris Wilner; Steve Post; Brienne Pedigo

== Standings after the race ==
Drivers' Championship standings

	Pos	Driver	Points
	1	Chase Elliott	507
1	2	Kyle Busch	498 (–9)
1	3	Ross Chastain	490 (–17)
	4	Ryan Blaney	479 (–28)
	5	Martin Truex Jr.	470 (–37)
	6	Joey Logano	467 (–40)
2	7	Kyle Larson	444 (–63)
	8	Alex Bowman	439 (–68)
2	9	William Byron	438 (–69)
	10	Christopher Bell	434 (–73)
3	11	Aric Almirola	385 (–122)
	12	Tyler Reddick	379 (–128)
2	13	Kevin Harvick	377 (–130)
1	14	Chase Briscoe	362 (–145)
1	15	Erik Jones	353 (–154)
1	16	Austin Dillon	350 (–157)
Official driver's standings

Manufacturers' Championship standings

Pos	Manufacturer	Points
1	Chevrolet	542
2	Toyota	521 (–21)
3	Ford	506 (–36)

- Note: Only the first 16 positions are included for the driver standings.
- . – Driver has clinched a position in the NASCAR Cup Series playoffs.

== Notes ==
Previous race: 2022 Coca-Cola 600	NASCAR Cup Series; 2022 season	Next race: 2022 Toyota/Save Mart 350
