= Michael McDowell (racing driver) =

American racing driver (born 1984)

- McDowell at Las Vegas Motor Speedway in 2026
- Born: Michael Christopher McDowell; December 21, 1984 (age 41); Phoenix, Arizona, U.S.
- Achievements: 2021 Daytona 500 Winner; 2004 Star Mazda Championship Champion
- Awards: 2007 ARCA Re/MAX Series Rookie of the Year; 2003 Star Mazda Championship Rookie of the Year

NASCAR Cup Series career
- 573 races run over 19 years
- Car no., team: No. 71 (Spire Motorsports)
- 2026 position: 20th
- Best finish: 15th (2023)
- First race: 2008 Goody's Cool Orange 500 (Martinsville)
- Last race: 2026 Season Finale 400 (Homestead)
- First win: 2021 Daytona 500 (Daytona)
- Last win: 2023 Verizon 200 at the Brickyard (Indianapolis G.P.)
| Wins | Top tens | Poles |
|---|---|---|
| 2 | 58 | 8 |

NASCAR O'Reilly Auto Parts Series career
- 95 races run over 10 years
- 2025 position: 99th
- Best finish: 13th (2009)
- First race: 2007 O'Reilly Challenge (Texas)
- Last race: 2025 Mission 200 at The Glen (Watkins Glen)
- First win: 2016 Road America 180 (Road America)
| Wins | Top tens | Poles |
|---|---|---|
| 1 | 20 | 2 |

NASCAR FedEx Freight Truck Series career
- 5 races run over 4 years
- 2026 position: 115th
- Best finish: 92nd (2025)
- First race: 2007 Kroger 200 (Martinsville)
- Last race: 2026 Fresh From Florida 250 (Daytona)
| Wins | Top tens | Poles |
|---|---|---|
| 0 | 0 | 0 |

ARCA Menards Series career
- 28 races run over 2 years
- Best finish: 2nd (2007)
- First race: 2006 Governor's Cup 200 (Milwaukee)
- Last race: 2007 Hantz Group 200 (Toledo)
- First win: 2007 WLWT Channel 5 150 (Kentucky)
- Last win: 2007 Hantz Group 200 (Toledo)
| Wins | Top tens | Poles |
|---|---|---|
| 4 | 18 | 9 |

Champ Car career
- 2 races run over 1 year
- Best finish: 21st (2005)
- First race: 2005 Lexmark Indy 300 (Surfers Paradise)
- Last race: 2005 Gran Premio Telmex Tecate (Mexico City)
| Wins | Podiums | Poles |
|---|---|---|
| 0 | 0 | 0 |
- Statistics up to date as of November 8, 2026.

Michael Christopher McDowell (born December 21, 1984) is an American professional stock car racing driver. He competes full-time in the NASCAR Cup Series, driving the No. 71 Chevrolet Camaro ZL1 for Spire Motorsports. He has previously competed in the NASCAR Xfinity Series and the NASCAR Craftsman Truck Series. He has also raced in open-wheel and sports cars.

McDowell began his career in open-wheel cars, which included competing in Formula Renault and Champ Car, and in sports cars like the Rolex Sports Car Series and 24 Hours of Daytona. He moved to stock car racing in 2006, and his first Cup Series season came in 2008, the latter of which saw him attract attention for a violent qualifying crash at Texas Motor Speedway. However, after losing his ride at Michael Waltrip Racing, much of McDowell's Cup career in the following years was with smaller teams, oftentimes as a start and park driver. McDowell won at Road America during the 2016 NASCAR Xfinity Series. McDowell did not run full-time in the Cup Series again until 2017 with Leavine Family Racing when he ran all 36 races. McDowell joined Front Row Motorsports in 2018, scoring his first Cup victory at the 2021 Daytona 500 with them. He moved to Spire Motorsports for 2025.

== Early career ==
McDowell started his career at the age of three racing BMX bicycles. He would always win his division because there were no other three or four-year-olds to compete against. At the start of each race, someone would have to hold him in the starting gate because his feet did not reach the ground. Then, when McDowell was eight years old, he moved to karting with help from his mother, Tracy, his father, Bill, and his older brother, Billy, who were all avid race fans. After ten years in karts, he would win not only the World Karting Association championship, but he would also take back-to-back International Kart Federation championships, along with 18 consecutive feature wins.

== Open wheel ==
From karts, McDowell moved into Formula Renault with World Speed Motorsports in 2002 and won the Infineon Raceway, Las Vegas, and Firebird International Raceway events in his rookie season. Moving up the ladder, McDowell would move to the Star Mazda Series in 2003. He took victories at Sebring and Road America en route to a runner-up finish in the points. McDowell won seven races in 2004 en route to winning the series championship. McDowell would be picked up by Champ Car team Rocketsports for Surfer's Paradise and Mexico City, but decided to move on in 2005 to the Grand-Am Cup Series.

== Grand-Am ==
During his run for the Star Mazda Championship, McDowell met businessman Rob Finlay at the Bob Bondurant School of High Performance Driving, where McDowell was an instructor. McDowell and Finlay soon established a partnership, and McDowell would drive his first sports car, a Porsche 996 in the Grand-Am Cup Series for Finlay Motorsports. In 2005, McDowell would stay at Finlay, but moved up to the Rolex Sports Car Series, joining veteran Memo Gidley in a BMW powered Riley sponsored by the Make A Wish Foundation. Together, they finished sixth in the overall points and took the team's first victory at Mexico City. McDowell made history by becoming the youngest driver to stand on the podium for a Grand-Am race at Barber Motorsports Park,, and became the first driver since Mario Andretti to compete in both an open-wheel race and a sports car race in the same weekend. McDowell would also drive the team's No. 60 BMW M3 in the Grand-Am Cup series to a podium finish at Daytona International Speedway. McDowell would stick with Finlay for 2006 and was again partnered with Gidley. The duo would improve to fourth in points despite being winless. McDowell also drove a No. 15 Ford Mustang with owner Finlay, driving the car to a win at Barber Motorsports Park. He would cap off his Grand-Am year with a second-place finish at Miller Motorsports Park.

McDowell returned to the series for the 2012 24 Hours of Daytona, driving for Michael Shank Racing with drivers Jorge Goncalvez, Felipe Nasr, and Gustavo Yacamán. The four drivers would end up finishing third.

== ARCA ==
ARCA RE/MAX Series owner Eddie Sharp put McDowell behind the wheel of his No. 2 Dodge for five races of the 2006 season, starting with the Governor's Cup 200 at the Milwaukee Mile, where he scored a 34th-place finish. McDowell finished in sixth place at Salem, fifth at Talladega, and fourth at Iowa.

McDowell returned to ESR to run the full schedule for Rookie of the Year honors in 2007. McDowell was involved in controversy at Toledo Speedway when his ESR teammate, Ken Butler III, spun him late in the race. Butler would take his first win while McDowell would rally for a top ten finish. McDowell got his first stock car win at Kentucky Speedway. He followed that up with wins at Pocono, Chicagoland, and the season finale at Toledo. Although McDowell was in contention for the ARCA Re/Max Series championship all season, he was unable to pose a serious threat to Frank Kimmel for Kimmel's ninth championship. McDowell scored a second-place finish in the points along with Rookie of the Year honors, as well as scoring nine pole positions during the season. As McDowell moved to NASCAR, his ESR ride was taken over by former Formula One driver Scott Speed.

== NASCAR ==
=== 2007–2008 ===
McDowell made his NASCAR debut in the Craftsman Truck Series. Driving the No. 17 for Darrell Waltrip Motorsports, McDowell qualified 29th and finished 30th after a late wreck. McDowell moved to the Busch Series as a developmental driver for Nextel Cup Series team Michael Waltrip Racing. Driving the No. 00 Toyota, McDowell drove at Texas, Phoenix, and Homestead, finishing respectively twentieth, fourteenth, and 32nd.

McDowell was chosen to drive the No. 00 Cup Series car in 2008 after Dale Jarrett's retirement; David Reutimann replaced Jarrett in the No. 44 UPS-sponsored car. McDowell started 34th and finished 26th in his Sprint Cup debut, the Goody's Cool Orange 500, after a flat tire near the end of the race. After the race, he was criticized by veteran driver Jeff Burton for having blocked Burton's way to the leader Denny Hamlin near the end of the race (McDowell was racing for the Lucky Dog free pass, which Burton did not realize at the time of his comments). In early August 2008, McDowell was pulled from the No. 00 Toyota Camry Sprint Cup car in favor of veteran NASCAR driver Mike Skinner for three races. Skinner helped evaluate the team's progress while trying to get the No. 00 into the Top 35 in owner points, though McDowell returned to the ride at Richmond on September 6, 2008. McDowell was again pulled from the No. 00 Toyota Camry when he failed to qualify for the Camping World RV 400 at Kansas on September 28. McDowell's contract was not renewed by MWR for 2009 when Michael Waltrip decided not to retire, and the team did not have a sponsorship for another car.

==== Crash at Texas Motor Speedway ====
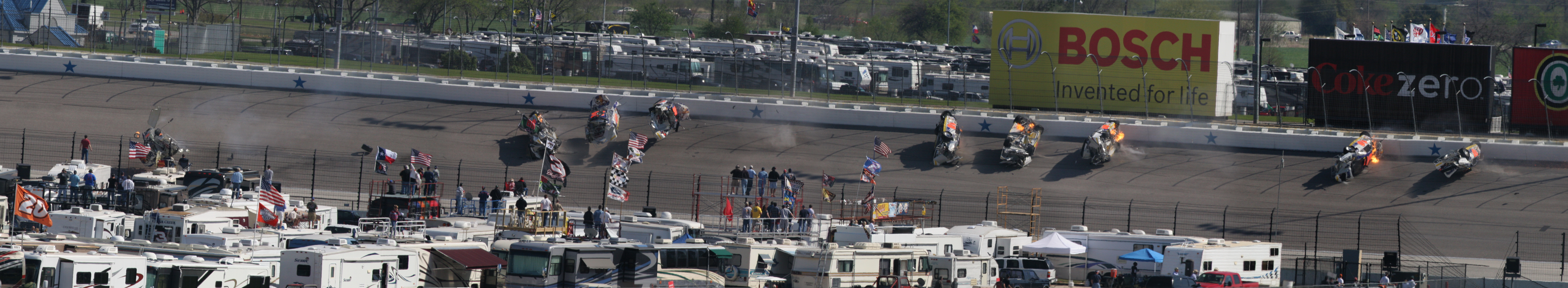
Panorama of McDowell's crash in sequence at Texas Motor Speedway

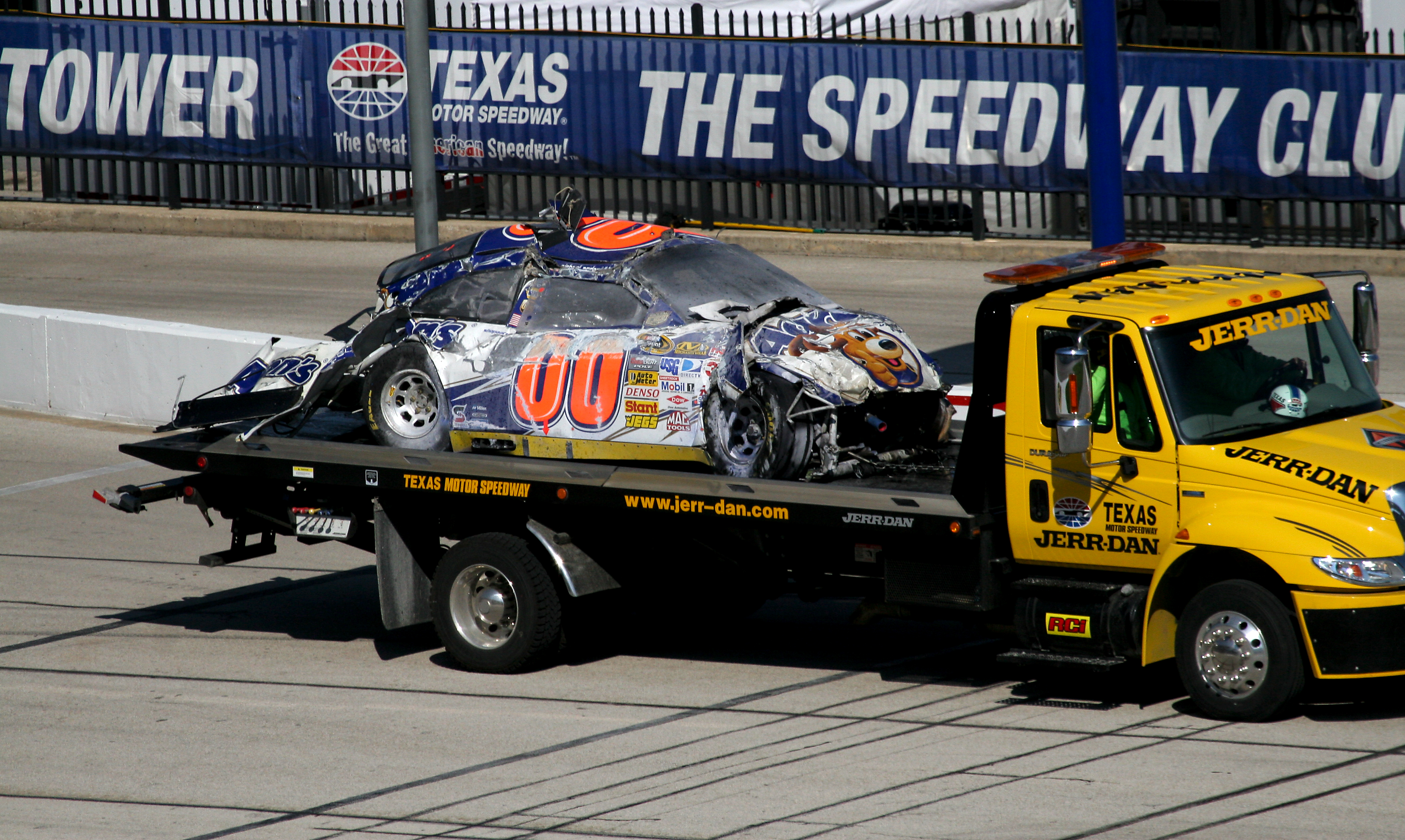
McDowell's car on the tow truck after the crash

While performing a qualifying attempt for the 2008 Samsung 500 at Texas Motor Speedway on April 4, 2008, McDowell had an accident that was strikingly similar to that of another racer with a road-racing background, Gordon Smiley, who died in a crash during Indianapolis 500 time trials in 1982. McDowell's right front sway bar broke entering Turn 1, which caused the car to hit the SAFER barrier almost head-on at approximately 185 miles per hour (298 km/h), according to data obtained and reported by SPEED channel (185 mph to zero mph in one foot, as reported by SPEED's Bob Dillner, before accelerating in the other direction). The car spun around once while tipping onto its roof, and then barrel-rolled eight times with fire coming out of the engine compartment, shedding debris in all directions, until coming to a stop back onto its tires. A large, dark impact mark was seen on the SAFER barrier, which showed how hard the car hit the barrier, which had to be repaired (the barrier moved inward when the car hit it), and as a result, qualifying for the race was delayed by an hour. The safety features of the barrier, the HANS device and the Car of Tomorrow racecar protected him. Because of this, he walked away from the crash without injury, and waved to the stunned crowd. Since his old car was destroyed, he had to switch to a backup car and ended up starting at the rear of the field in the race.

=== 2009 ===
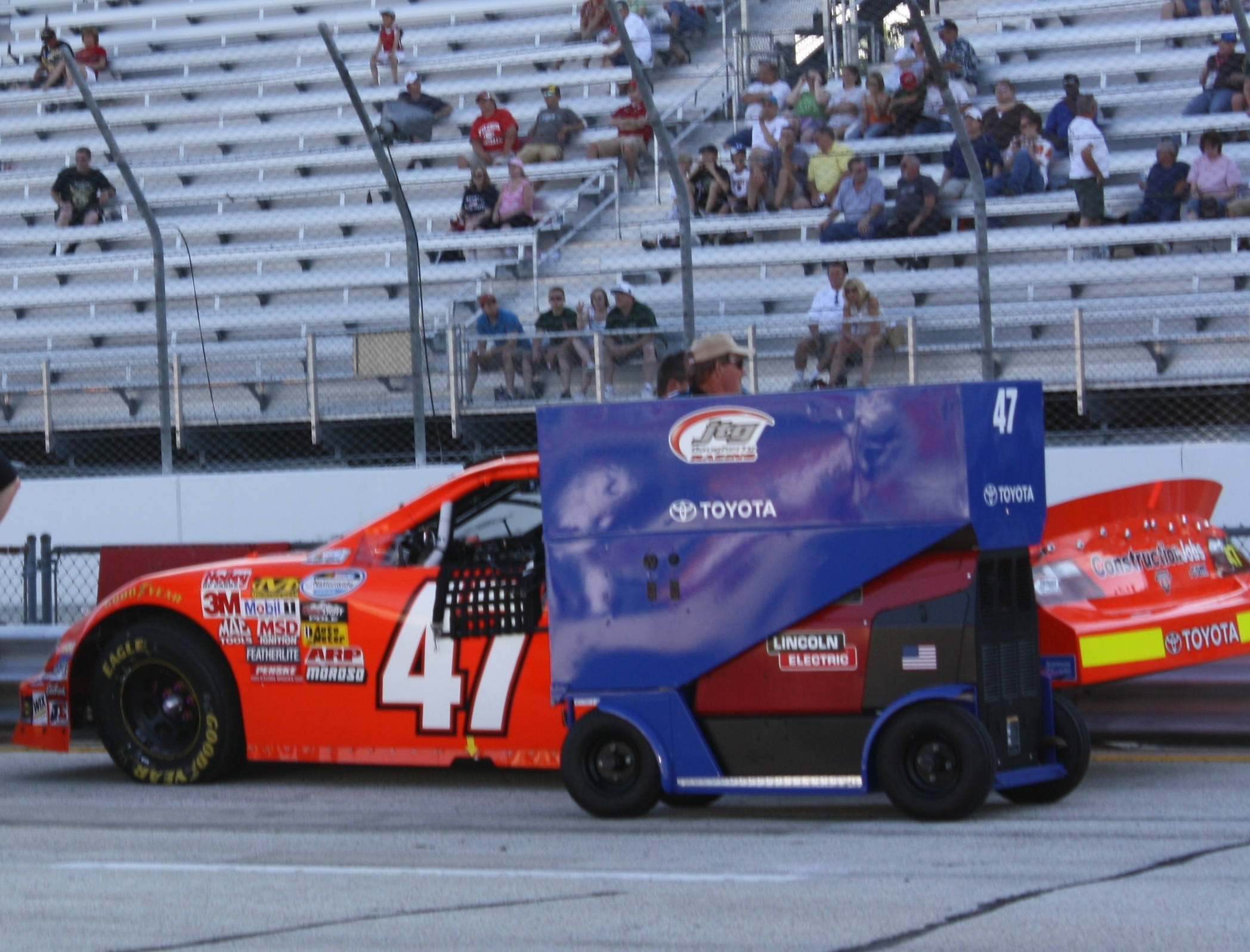
McDowell's 2009 No. 47 Nationwide car

In 2009, McDowell drove a part-time schedule for JTG Daugherty Racing in the NASCAR Nationwide Series. On February 25, 2009, McDowell's first child, Trace Christopher, was born, named after Michael's late mother, Tracy. The baby boy was seven pounds, seven ounces, and born at 7:00 a.m. McDowell next attempted the April 2009 race at Talladega for Prism Motorsports in the Sprint Cup Series, as a regular driver Dave Blaney had a family obligation. After JTG Daugherty Racing ran out of sponsorship support after the second race at Daytona International Speedway, it was announced that he would drive the next two races for MacDonald Motorsports. He also competed in several races with Tommy Baldwin Racing in the No. 36 Toyota Camry. McDowell remained in the top ten for most of the season. McDowell also competed in the Camping World Truck Series in 2009 for ThorSport Motorsports, driving the No. 98 Chevy Silverado.

=== 2010–2011 ===
In 2010, McDowell started the Cup Series season for Prism Motorsports. He drove the No. 55 car, then moved to the No. 46 team of Whitney Motorsports. In the Nationwide Series, he drove full-time for MacDonald Motorsports where he got one top 10 and finished 21st in points despite missing two races. In 2011, McDowell drove the No. 66 Toyota for HP Racing in the Sprint Cup Series. JGR also added the Bucyrus 200 at Road America to McDowell's schedule, leaving open the possibility of adding more races. McDowell also drove one race for Joe Gibbs Racing in the Sprint Cup Series at Texas after NASCAR parked Kyle Busch following his actions at a Truck Series event.

=== 2012–2013 ===
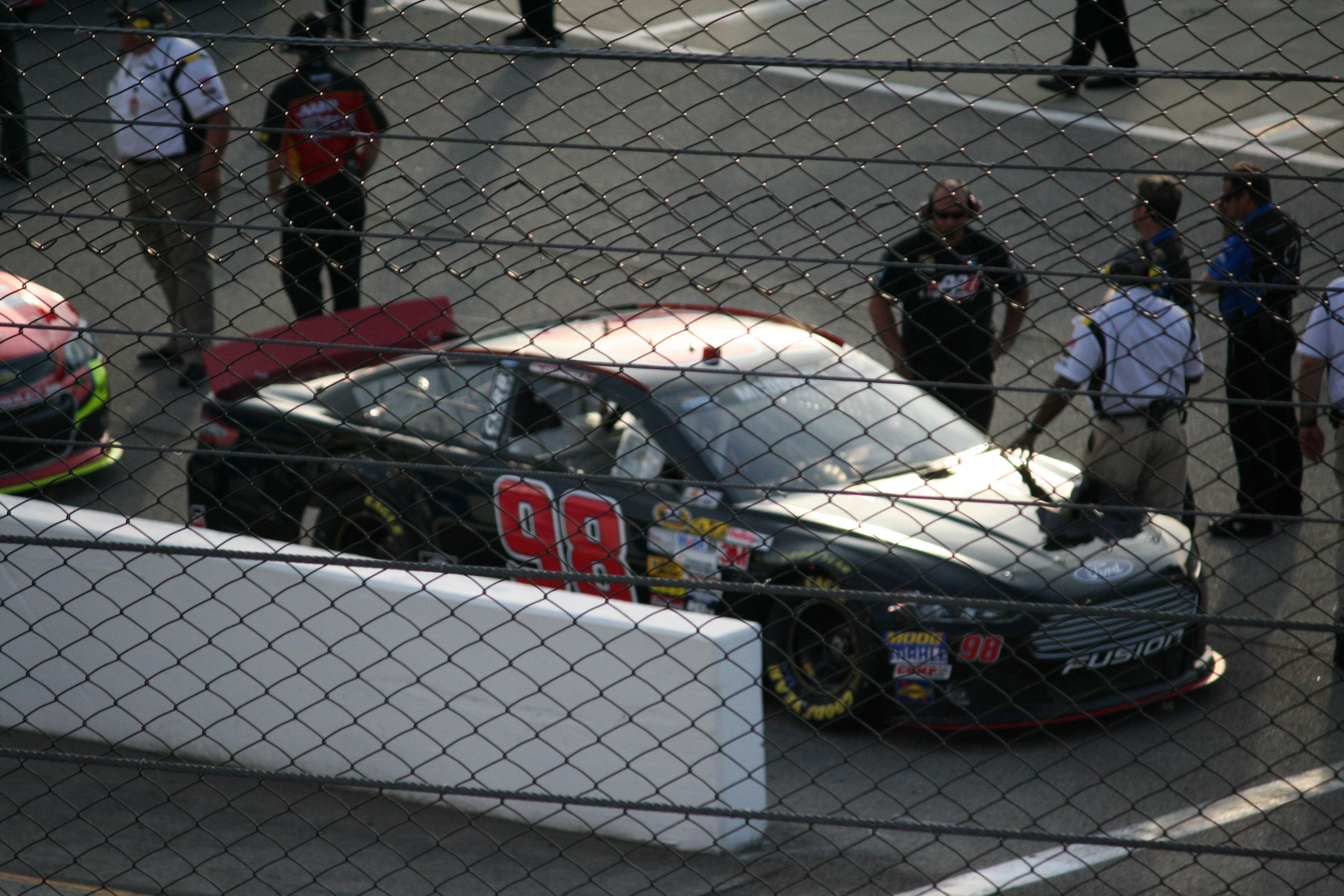
McDowell's 2013 Sprint Cup car

In 2012, McDowell ran the Joe Gibbs Racing No. 18 Nationwide Series car in select races, and competed in the Sprint Cup Series for Phil Parsons Racing (formerly HP Racing) full-time; the team secured full sponsorship for the first five races of the season. It formed a partnership with Whitney Motorsports and Mike Curb to field McDowell's car, which carried the No. 98.

In the 2013 Daytona 500, McDowell recorded a then-career high ninth-place finish. Later in the season in the Nationwide Series, McDowell won the pole for the inaugural Nationwide Children's Hospital 200 at Mid-Ohio. McDowell finished second behind A. J. Allmendinger.

=== 2014: Leavine Family Racing ===
In October 2013, it was announced that McDowell would be moving to Leavine Family Racing's No. 95 Ford for the 2014 NASCAR Sprint Cup Series season. McDowell failed to qualify for the 2014 Daytona 500. McDowell had a Sprint Cup career-best seventh-place finish in the Coke Zero 400.

At the Cheez-It 355 at The Glen, on lap 64, Greg Biffle came up on Ryan Newman's front bumper, turning him into the outside retaining wall. His car ricocheted off the wall into McDowell's path, where Newman barely clipped McDowell in the right rear of his car, and with the force of the impact, the rear end housing snapped, causing him to get airborne. The car bounced twice in the air before it hit the wall. His housing was forced against the wall. The race was red-flagged, though both drivers were unharmed.

=== 2015–2016 ===
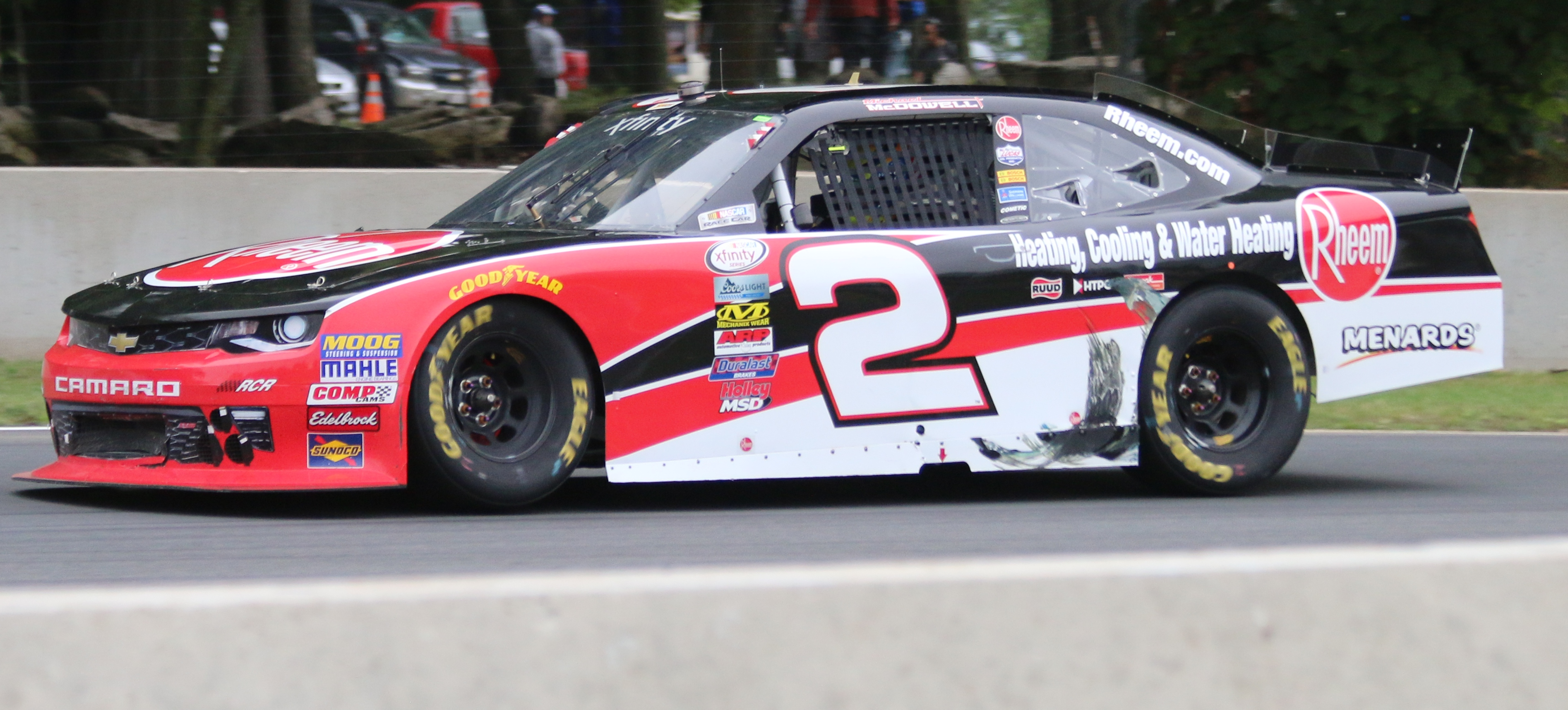
McDowell racing during his first NASCAR win at Road America

McDowell returned to the LFR No. 95 car for a twenty-race schedule in 2015. The team merged with Circle Sport in 2016 and switched to Chevrolet, with McDowell splitting the schedule with Ty Dillon with sponsorship from Thrivent Financial, Cheerios, and WRL Contractors, among others. The season started with McDowell placing 15th in the 2016 Daytona 500, a best for LFR in the Great American Race. McDowell was able to get a tenth-place finish in the 2016 Coke Zero 400, his best finish of the season. At the end of the season at Homestead, McDowell drove the No. 59 Chevrolet after CSLFR purchased a charter from the closing Tommy Baldwin Racing. McDowell ran decent all night, and towards the end, he was able to avoid the big wreck involving Championship contender Carl Edwards and was able to get a tenth-place finish, his first non restrictor plate top-ten finish.

McDowell drove for Richard Childress Racing in the No. 2 in a one-race deal at Road America, which got McDowell his first NASCAR victory. McDowell led the final 24 laps en route to the win.

=== 2017 ===
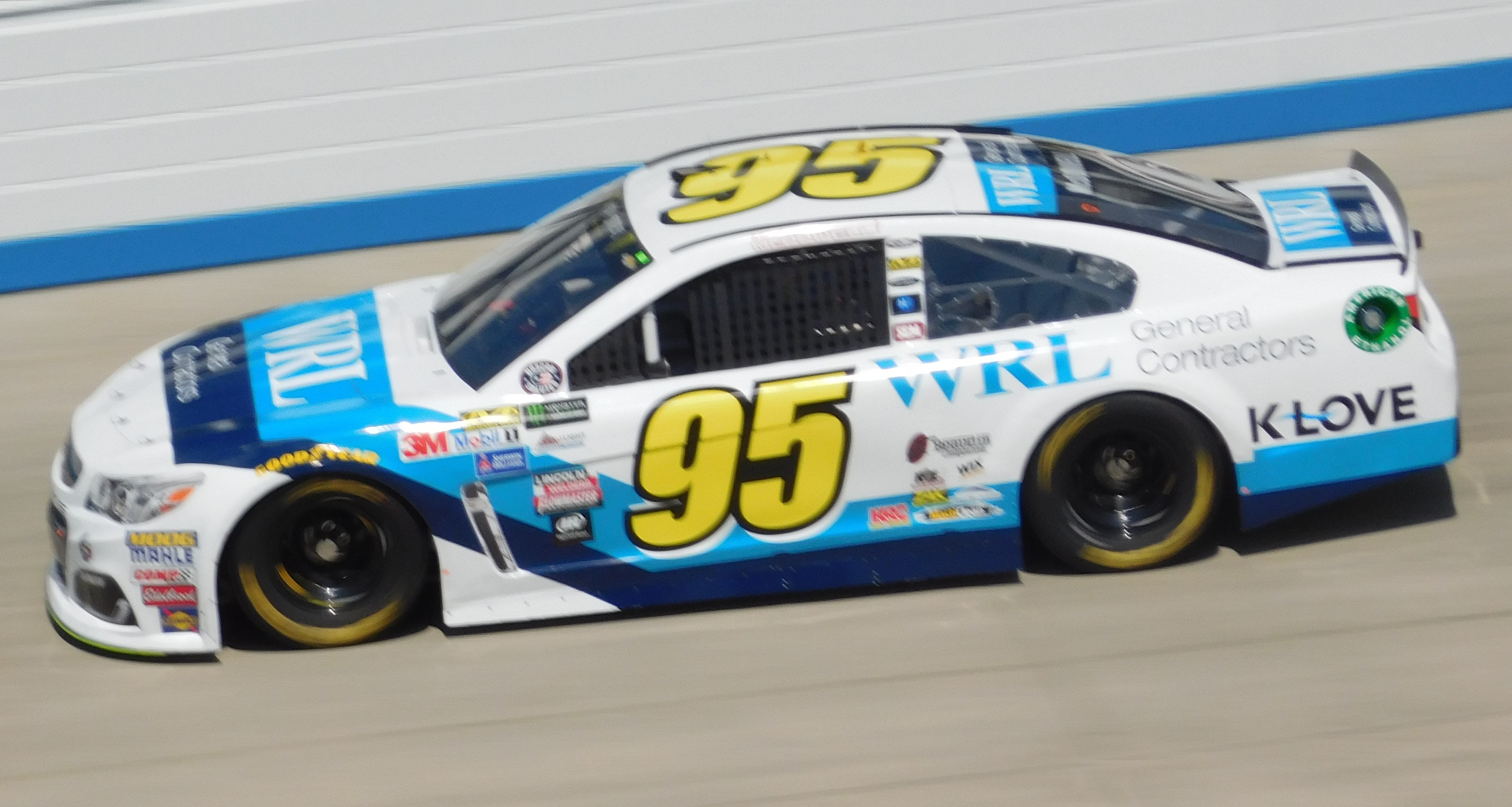
McDowell's No. 95 at Dover International Speedway in 2017

McDowell returned to Leavine Family Racing's No. 95 Chevrolet in 2017. He started the season with a fifteenth-place finish in the Daytona 500. At Kansas, McDowell scored a season-best thirteenth-place finish. At Dover, McDowell scored his third straight top-twenty finish, a career first, when he finished nineteenth upon avoiding a last-lap crash. At Daytona for the Coke Zero 400, McDowell spent most of the race towards the front and competed late for the win, as he was in second place on the last lap before ending the race with a career-best fourth-place finish, his first career top-five finish. It was also the best finishing result for Leavine Family Racing as a team.

McDowell completed 99 percent of the laps in 2017, the most among any full-time driver in the Cup Series that season, and finished a career-best 26th in the standings. It would be his final season with LFR.

=== 2018: Front Row Motorsports ===
On September 19, 2017, Leavine announced Kasey Kahne would be replacing McDowell in the No. 95 car for the 2018 season. On November 24, 2017, Front Row Motorsports announced that McDowell would drive their No. 34 car full-time in 2018, replacing Landon Cassill. In the first race of the season, McDowell raced up front late and finished ninth in the 2018 Daytona 500, his fifth straight top-fifteen finish at Daytona (and third top ten in the last four races at the track) and tied his career-best finish in the race. McDowell would have a strong run in the 2018 Coke Zero Sugar 400, leading twenty laps, a career-best, and would finish second in stage 2 behind Ricky Stenhouse Jr. Unfortunately, with seven laps to go, McDowell would crash out of the race and finish 26th. McDowell would later tie his best finish in the Cup series points standings of 26th after leading laps at his final race of the season in Homestead.

=== 2019 ===
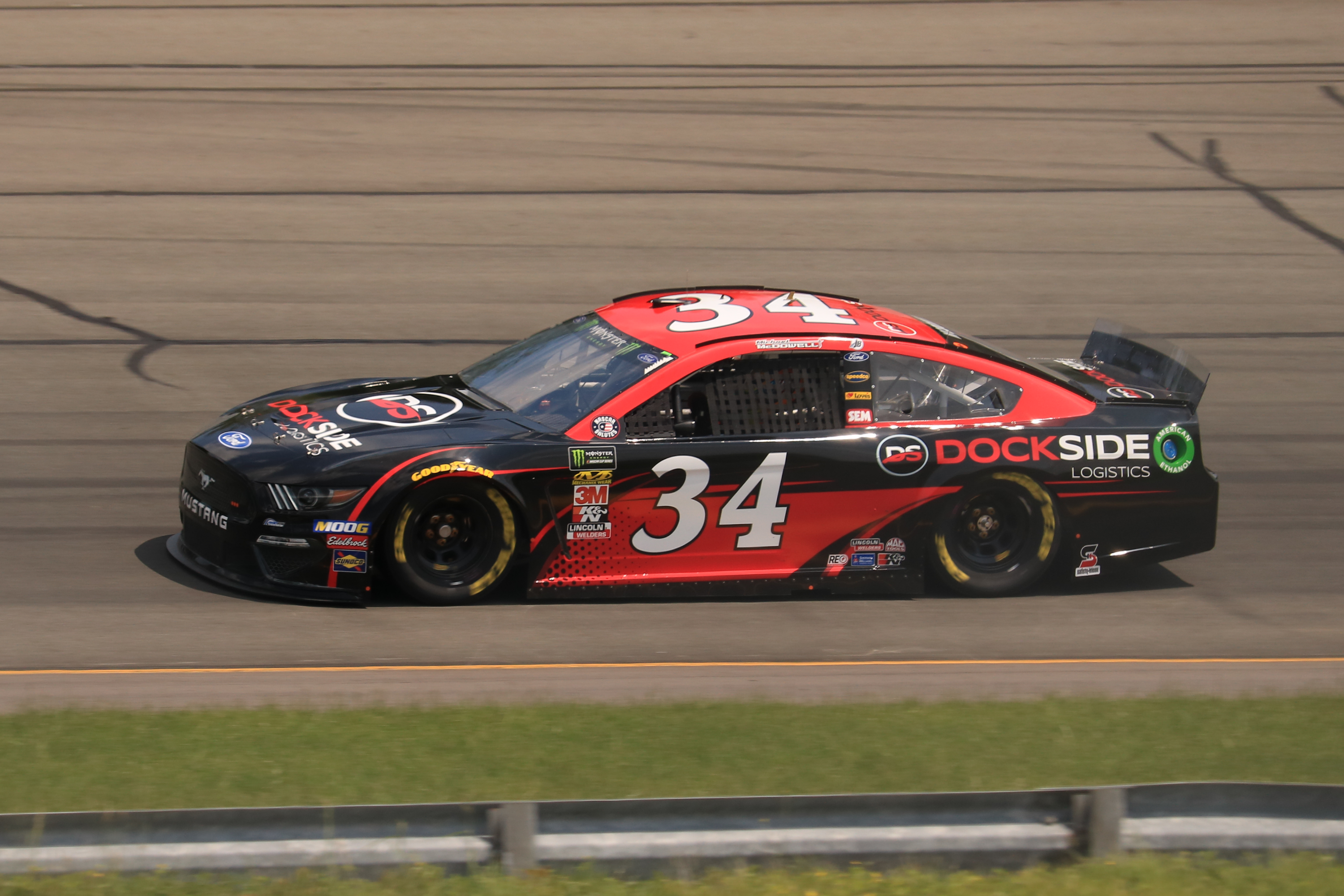
McDowell practicing at Pocono in 2019

In 2019, McDowell returned to the No. 34 car for Front Row Motorsports. McDowell's longtime sponsor K-Love took a year-long break from being a primary sponsor of his car. In the 2019 Daytona 500, the first race of the season, he qualified in 34th and finished in fifth, which would become his career-best finish in the Daytona 500 as well as his second-best finish in a Cup Series race. After the race, 2018 champion Joey Logano confronted McDowell for not helping him win the Daytona 500, in which McDowell stated, "My team doesn't pay me to push you." During qualifying for the 2019 TicketGuardian 500 at ISM Raceway, McDowell had an on-track incident with Daniel Suárez, which resulted in a fight on pit road.

Two days before the 2019 Bank of America Roval 400 at Charlotte Motor Speedway, McDowell was rushed to the hospital after complaining of abdominal pain. He was cleared to race after passing kidney stones during the examination. McDowell would go on to run up front in the 1000bulbs.com 500 at Talladega Superspeedway, and even had a chance to win the race being in third place on the final lap of the race, and would finish fifth, capturing his second top-five of 2019, the first time he would have multiple top-fives in a single cup series season in his career.

=== 2020 ===
On December 12, 2019, Front Row Motorsports announced that McDowell would return to the No. 34 for the 2020 season. McDowell started the year off with a fourteenth-place finish in the 2020 Daytona 500, his fifth consecutive top-fifteen in the Daytona 500 and his eighth top-fifteen in his last nine Daytona races. McDowell would go on to qualify 3rd for the second Charlotte race due to the random draw, and McDowell has boomed onto the scene since coming off of NASCAR's break. McDowell would capture an eighth-place finish at Pocono and, following a DNF, a seventh-place finish at Indianapolis, marking the first time in his career he earned two top-tens two weeks in a row. McDowell would set a career-best for most top-fifteens in a season in just sixteen races with six, and has finished higher than his qualifying effort in fifteen of his twenty starts. In his first twenty starts, McDowell had more lead lap finishes than the likes of Kyle Busch, Erik Jones, Jimmie Johnson, William Byron, Alex Bowman, and Ryan Blaney, finishing on the lead lap fifteen of the first twenty races that season. During the All-Star Open at Bristol Motor Speedway, McDowell would win the pole and run up front most of the day before an on-track incident with driver Bubba Wallace, which led to an angry interview from Wallace, as well as leaving the front bumper of his car by McDowell's garage. McDowell and Wallace later set aside their differences and, along with McDowell's sponsor carparts.com, used the front bumper to raise over $34,000 for multiple charities, including Victory Junction, and eventually gave away the front bumper to a fan. McDowell would capture his first top-ten finish on a road course in his career at the Daytona road course and would earn his new best career points standings finish in the Cup Series in 23rd. It was announced a month before the 2021 season started that McDowell had signed a one-year contract extension with FRM to return to the No. 34 for the following season.

=== 2021: Daytona 500 win and first playoff appearance ===
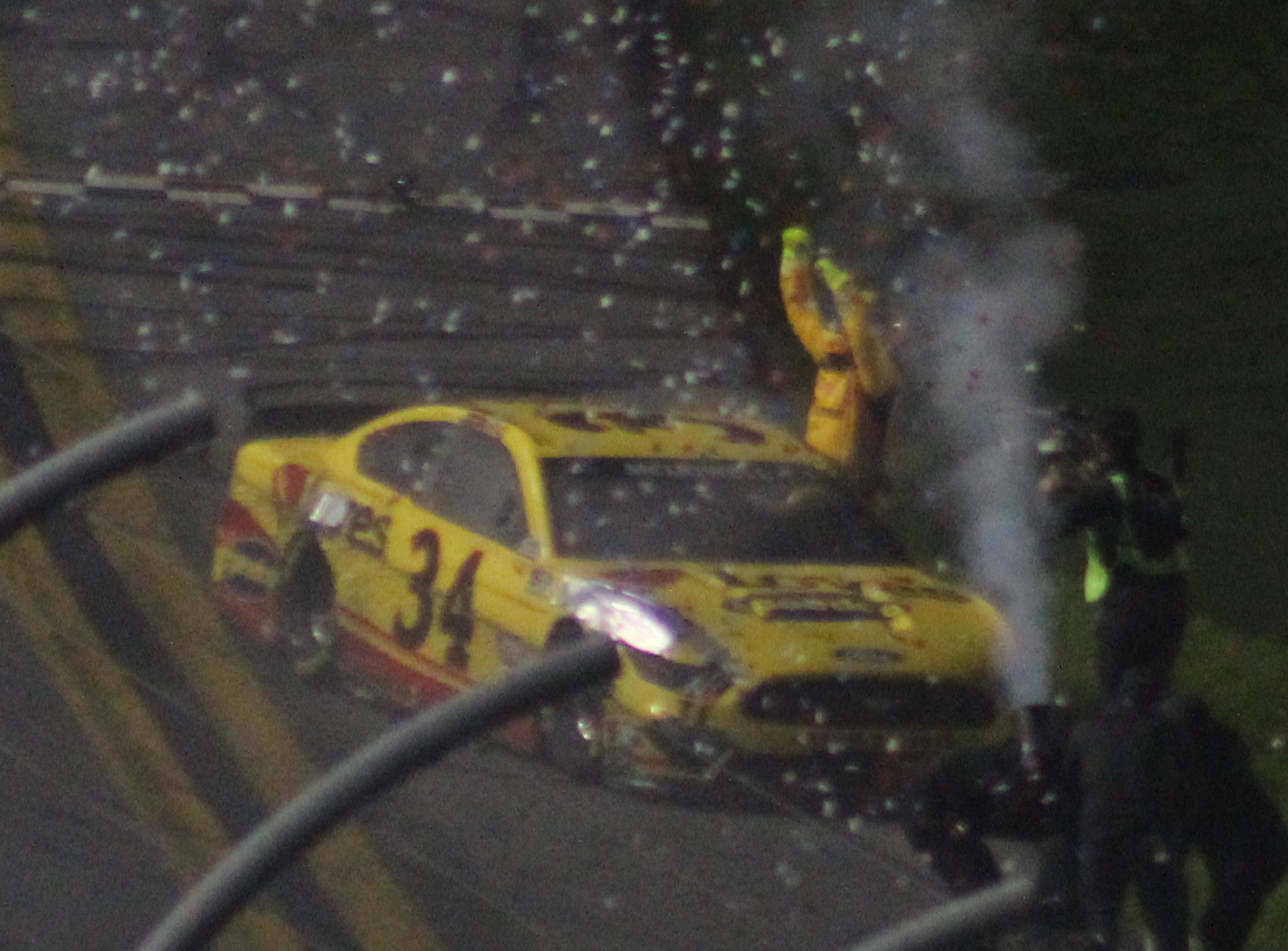
McDowell celebrating after winning the 2021 Daytona 500

McDowell remained in FRM's No. 34 for a fourth year in 2021. He won the season-opening Daytona 500 after avoiding a crash involving the leaders Joey Logano and Brad Keselowski on the final lap. Before his big victory, McDowell had the second-most Cup Series starts before his first win. It was his first Cup Series win in his 358th start, second only to Michael Waltrip, whose first win came in his 463rd start. He would go on to finish the first three races of the season inside the top ten. McDowell also nearly won at Talladega in the spring, finishing a close third behind Keselowski and Byron. McDowell would follow this performance with a strong seventh-place finish at the inaugural Cup Series race at Circuit of the Americas after early contact with Martin Truex Jr.. McDowell's win at Daytona locked him into the All-Star Race and the NASCAR playoffs for the first time in his fourteen-year Cup Series career. McDowell was eliminated from the playoffs following the conclusion of the Round of 16 at Bristol. He finished the season with one win, two top-fives, five top-tens, an average finish of 20.5, and finished sixteenth in the points standings.

=== 2022 ===
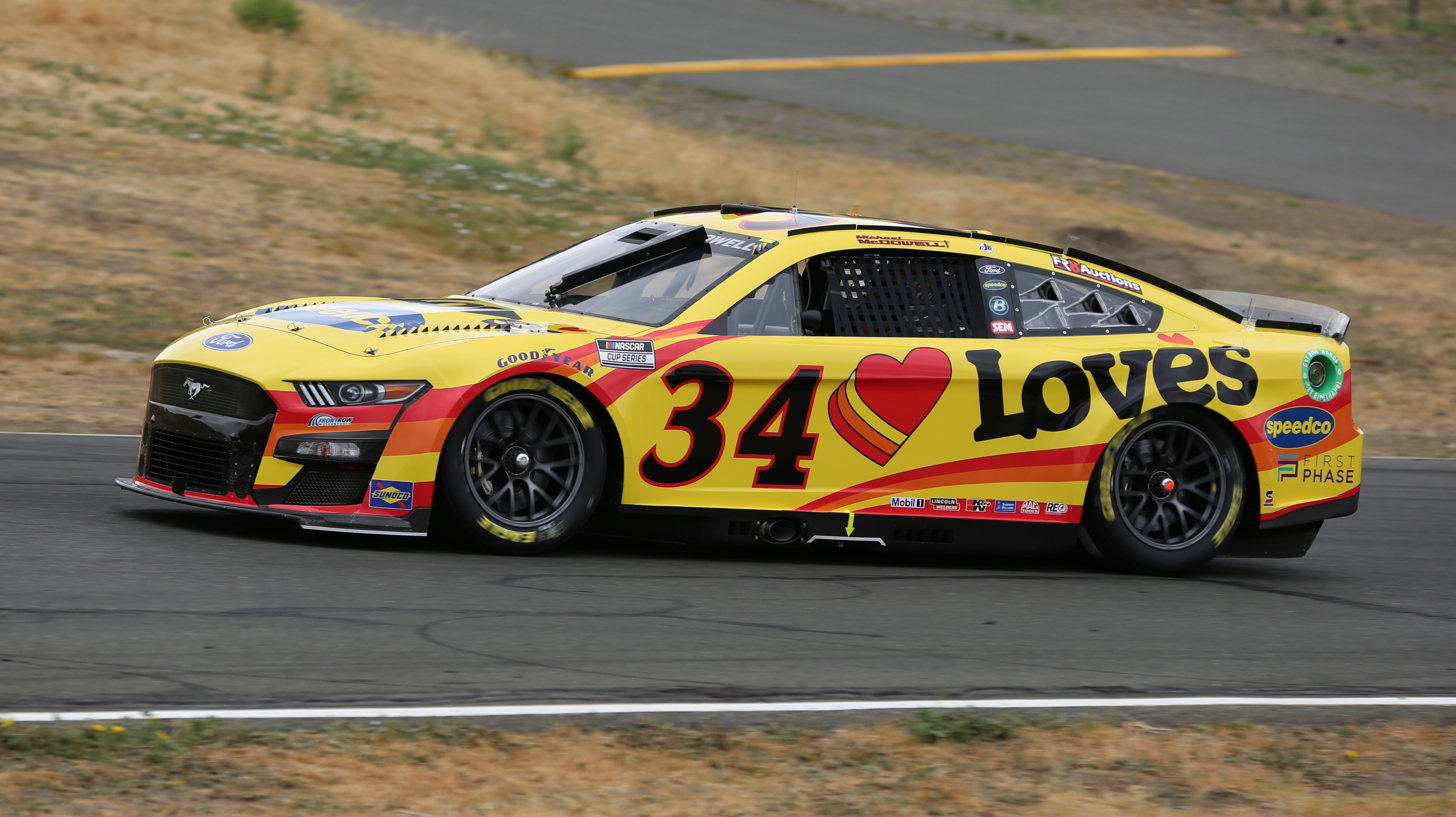
McDowell’s No. 34 car at Sonoma Raceway in 2022

McDowell started the 2022 season with a seventh-place finish at the 2022 Daytona 500. He scored seven top-ten finishes during the regular season. On July 26, crew chief Blake Harris was suspended for four races and fined US$100,000 for an L2 Penalty during post-race inspection after the 2022 M&M's Fan Appreciation 400 at Pocono. The penalty came under Sections 14.1 C, D, and Q and 14.5 A and B in the NASCAR Rule Book, both of which pertain to the body and overall vehicle assembly rules surrounding modification of a single-source supplied part. In addition, the No. 34 team was docked one hundred driver and owner points and ten playoff points.

=== 2023: Return to the playoffs ===
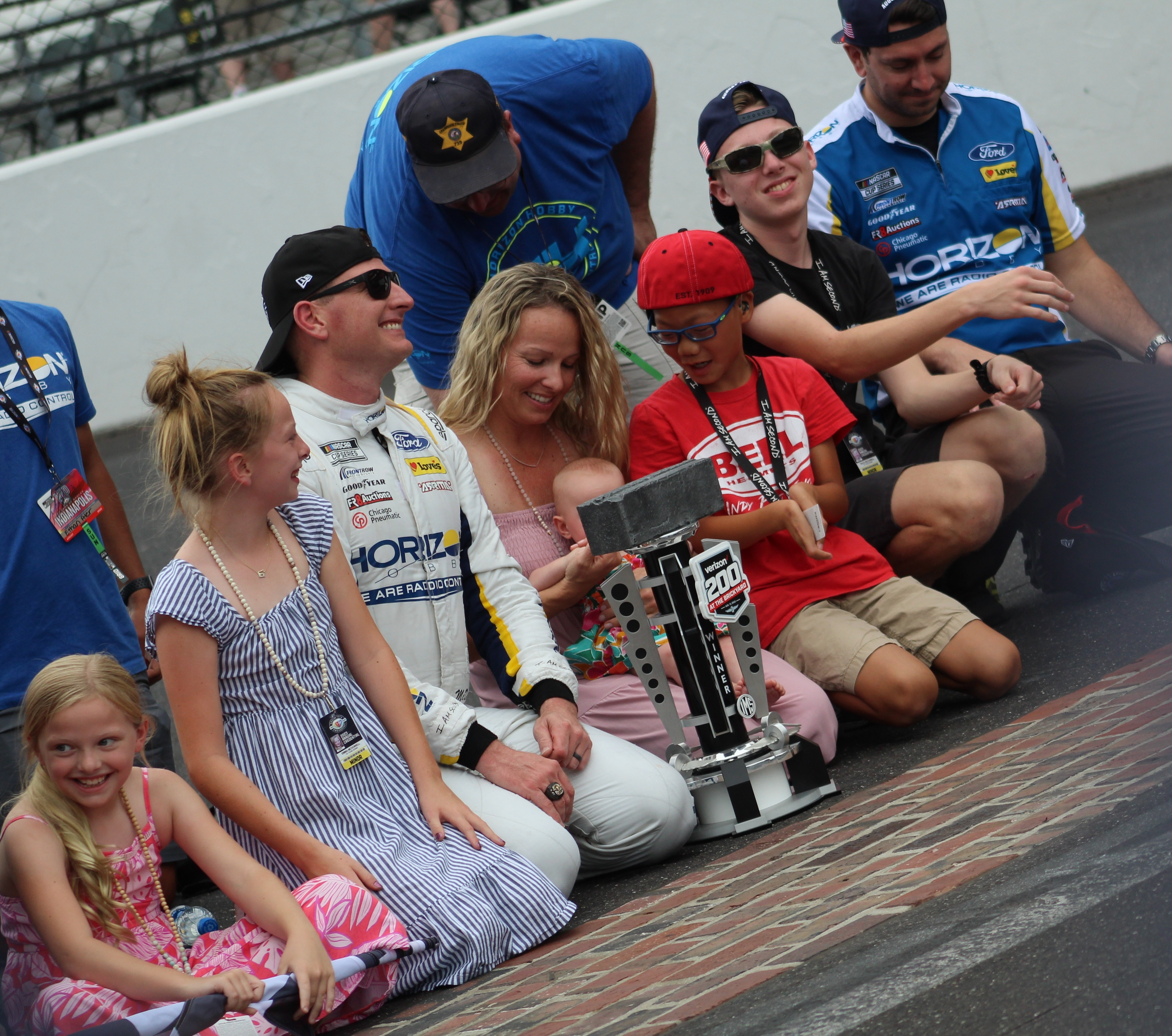
McDowell after winning the 2023 Verizon 200 at the Brickyard

McDowell began the 2023 season with a 28th-place finish at the 2023 Daytona 500. He dominated the Indianapolis road race, landing him in the playoffs and earning him his second career win, as well as his first career stage win in the first stage of the race. He was eliminated at the conclusion of the Round of 16. He finished the season with one win, two top-fives, eight top-tens, an average finish of 19.0, and finished fifteenth in the point standings.

=== 2024: First career pole and final year with FRM ===
McDowell began the 2024 season with a 36th-place finish at the 2024 Daytona 500. McDowell had his first pole at Atlanta after 467 Cup Series starts. At the race at Talladega, McDowell was leading on the final lap when he spun out trying to block Brad Keselowski. He finished 31st, not crossing the start-finish line and being marked with a DNF. On May 8, 2024, McDowell announced he would leave FRM at the end of the 2024 season, and he had signed a multi-year contract with Spire Motorsports to drive the No. 71 Chevrolet starting in 2025. On June 1, 2024, McDowell won his third pole of the season for the Enjoy Illinois 300 at Gateway. He set a track record in Round 1 of qualifying with a 32.318s (139.241 mph) lap time. McDowell finished his final year with FRM in 23rd place in the final point standings. McDowell also finished the season with a career best six poles, the most of any driver on the season.

=== 2025: First year at Spire Motorsports ===
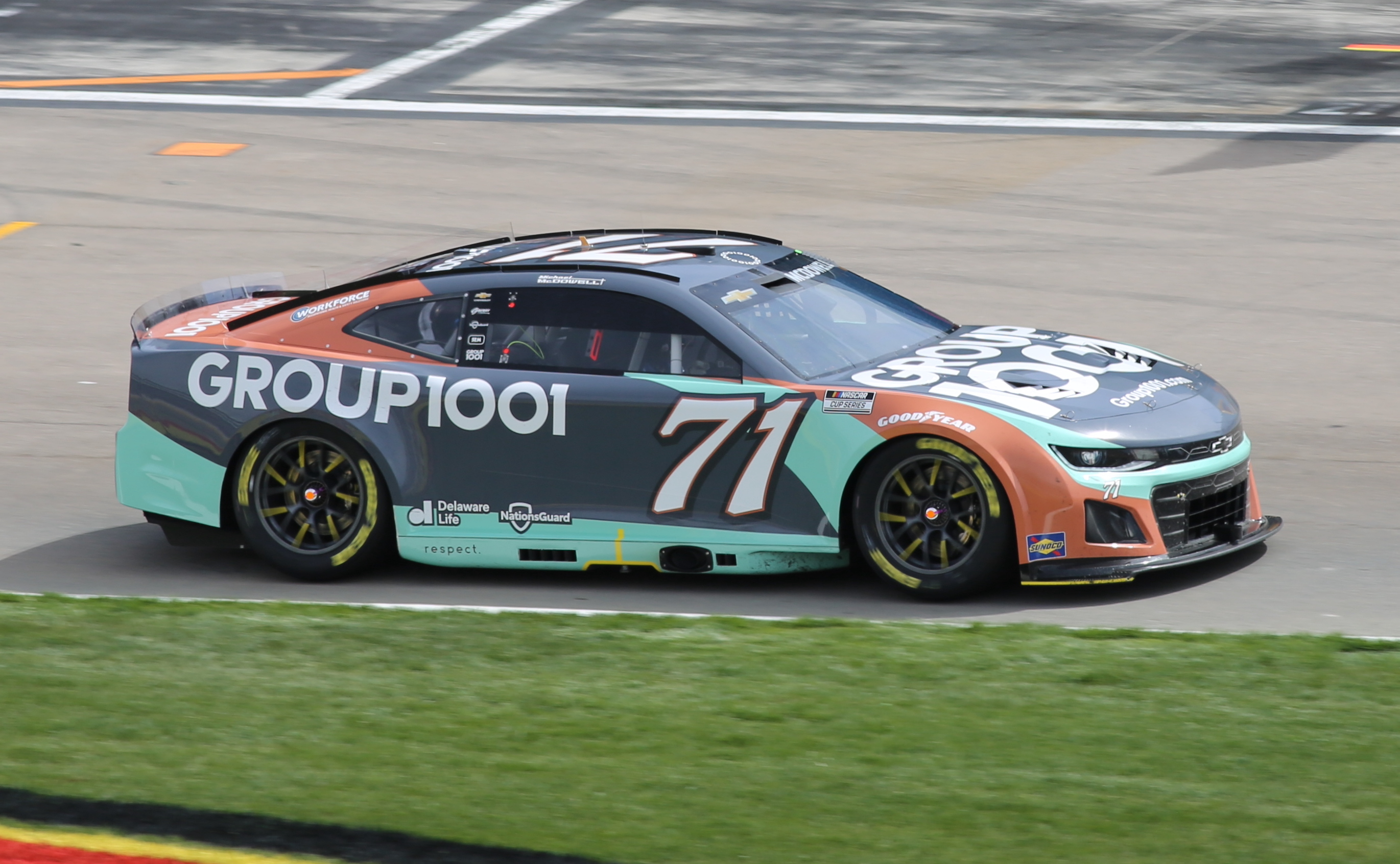
McDowell's No. 71 car at Las Vegas Motor Speedway in 2025

McDowell began the 2025 season with an eleventh-place finish at the Daytona 500. At Las Vegas, McDowell would score his first pole of the season and Spire's first Cup Series pole. McDowell would have an up-and-down year, having many close calls.

Kaulig Racing's Josh Williams was released by the team on July 30, McDowell would drive the No. 11 for the team at Watkins Glen in his place.

On January 29, it was announced that McDowell would return to the Truck Series after sixteen years, driving the No. 07 truck for Spire Motorsports at Daytona and Atlanta.

=== 2026 ===
McDowell's No. 71 car at Las Vegas Motor Speedway in 2026

McDowell began the 2026 season with an 22nd-place finish at the Daytona 500.

McDowell completed in the Truck Series race at Daytona.

== Personal life ==
McDowell is married to Jami and they have five children. McDowell is a Christian. He is a native of Glendale, Arizona.

McDowell and Justin Marks currently own a karting facility called the Trackhouse Motorplex, located 30 miles north of Charlotte, North Carolina. The facility opened in October 2012 and is inspired by another karting track located in Parma, Italy.

== Motorsports career results ==
=== Racing career summary ===
| Season | Series | Team | Races | Wins | Top 5 | Top 10 | Points | Position |
|---|---|---|---|---|---|---|---|---|
| 2002 | Fran-Am 1600 Championship Series | World Speed Motorsports | 8 | 3 | ? | ? | ? | **2nd** |
| 2003 | Star Mazda Series | N/A | 9 | 2 | 6 | 9 | 335 | **2nd** |
| 2004 | Star Mazda Series | N/A | 10 | 7 | 8 | 8 | 384 | **1st** |
| 2005 | Rolex Sports Car Series - DP | Finlay Motorsports | 13 | 1 | 6 | 10 | 307 | 7th |
| 2005 | 24 Hours of Daytona | Finlay Motorsports | 1 | 0 | 0 | 0 | N/A | 19th |
| 2005 | Champ Car World Series | Rocketsports Racing | 2 | 0 | 0 | 0 | 19 | 21st |
| 2006 | ARCA Re/Max Series | Hixson Motorsports | 1 | 0 | 0 | 0 | 965 | 40th |
| 2006 | ARCA Re/Max Series | Eddie Sharp Racing | 4 | 0 | 2 | 3 | 965 | 40th |
| 2006 | Rolex Sports Car Series - DP | Playboy/Uniden Racing | 16 | 1 | 6 | 13 | 377 | 7th |
| 2006 | 24 Hours of Daytona | Playboy/Uniden Racing | 1 | 0 | 0 | 1 | N/A | 6th |
| 2007 | ARCA Re/Max Series | Eddie Sharp Racing | 23 | 4 | 11 | 15 | 5455 | **2nd** |
| 2007 | NASCAR Craftsman Truck Series | Darrell Waltrip Motorsports | 1 | 0 | 0 | 0 | 0 | 117th |
| 2007 | NASCAR Busch Series | Michael Waltrip Racing | 3 | 0 | 0 | 0 | 291 | 94th |
| 2007 | Rolex Sports Car Series - DP | Finlay Motorsports | 1 | 0 | 0 | 1 | ? | ? |
| 2007 | 24 Hours of Daytona | Finlay Motorsports | 1 | 0 | 0 | 1 | N/A | 10th |
| 2008 | NASCAR Nationwide Series | MSRP Motorsports | 1 | 0 | 0 | 0 | 119 | 112th |
| 2008 | NASCAR Nationwide Series | Michael Waltrip Racing | 1 | 0 | 0 | 0 | 119 | 112th |
| 2008 | NASCAR Sprint Cup Series | Michael Waltrip Racing | 20 | 0 | 0 | 0 | 1466 | 40th |
| 2008 | Rolex Sports Car Series - DP | Spirit of Daytona Racing | 1 | 0 | 0 | 0 | ? | ? |
| 2008 | 24 Hours of Daytona | Spirit of Daytona Racing | 1 | 0 | 0 | 1 | N/A | 10th |
| 2009 | NASCAR Camping World Truck Series | ThorSport Racing | 1 | 0 | 0 | 0 | 0 | 111th |
| 2009 | NASCAR Nationwide Series | JTG Daugherty Racing | 17 | 0 | 0 | 3 | 3449 | 13th |
| 2009 | NASCAR Nationwide Series | MacDonald Motorsports | 3 | 0 | 0 | 0 | 3449 | 13th |
| 2009 | NASCAR Nationwide Series | Whitney Motorsports | 13 | 0 | 0 | 2 | 3449 | 13th |
| 2009 | NASCAR Sprint Cup Series | Prism Motorsports | 0 | 0 | 0 | 0 | 326 | 52nd |
| 2009 | NASCAR Sprint Cup Series | Tommy Baldwin Racing | 8 | 0 | 0 | 0 | 326 | 52nd |
| 2010 | NASCAR Nationwide Series | MacDonald Motorsports | 33 | 0 | 0 | 1 | 2770 | 21st |
| 2010 | NASCAR Sprint Cup Series | Prism Motorsports | 17 | 0 | 0 | 0 | 870 | 45th |
| 2010 | NASCAR Sprint Cup Series | Whitney Motorsports | 7 | 0 | 0 | 0 | 870 | 45th |
| 2011 | NASCAR Nationwide Series | Joe Gibbs Racing | 5 | 0 | 1 | 4 | 0 | NC† |
| 2011 | NASCAR Sprint Cup Series | Joe Gibbs Racing | 1 | 0 | 0 | 0 | 139 | 36th |
| 2011 | NASCAR Sprint Cup Series | HP Racing | 31 | 0 | 0 | 0 | 139 | 36th |
| 2011 | Rolex Sports Car Series - DP | Michael Shank Racing | 1 | 0 | 0 | 1 | 24 | 29th |
| 2011 | 24 Hours of Daytona | Michael Shank Racing | 1 | 0 | 0 | 1 | N/A | 7th |
| 2012 | NASCAR Nationwide Series | Joe Gibbs Racing | 5 | 0 | 2 | 5 | 0 | NC† |
| 2012 | NASCAR Nationwide Series | SR^{2} Motorsports | 1 | 0 | 0 | 0 | 0 | NC† |
| 2012 | NASCAR Sprint Cup Series | Phil Parsons Racing | 30 | 0 | 0 | 0 | 187 | 37th |
| 2012 | Rolex Sports Car Series - DP | Michael Shank Racing | 1 | 0 | 1 | 1 | 30 | 28th |
| 2012 | 24 Hours of Daytona | Michael Shank Racing | 1 | 0 | 1 | 1 | N/A | **3rd** |
| 2013 | NASCAR Nationwide Series | Joe Gibbs Racing | 2 | 0 | 1 | 1 | 0 | NC† |
| 2013 | NASCAR Nationwide Series | SR^{2} Motorsports | 3 | 0 | 0 | 0 | 0 | NC† |
| 2013 | NASCAR Nationwide Series | TriStar Motorsports | 2 | 0 | 0 | 0 | 0 | NC† |
| 2013 | NASCAR Sprint Cup Series | Phil Parsons Racing | 31 | 0 | 0 | 1 | 210 | 37th |
| 2013 | NASCAR Sprint Cup Series | Front Row Motorsports | 1 | 0 | 0 | 0 | 210 | 37th |
| 2013 | NASCAR Sprint Cup Series | HScott Motorsports | 1 | 0 | 0 | 0 | 210 | 37th |
| 2014 | NASCAR Nationwide Series | Joe Gibbs Racing | 2 | 0 | 1 | 2 | 0 | NC† |
| 2014 | NASCAR Nationwide Series | Team Penske | 1 | 0 | 0 | 1 | 0 | NC† |
| 2014 | NASCAR Sprint Cup Series | Leavine Family Racing | 19 | 0 | 0 | 1 | 255 | 37th |
| 2015 | NASCAR Sprint Cup Series | Leavine Family Racing | 16 | 0 | 0 | 0 | 213 | 39th |
| 2016 | NASCAR Xfinity Series | Richard Childress Racing | 1 | 1 | 1 | 1 | 0 | NC† |
| 2016 | NASCAR Sprint Cup Series | Circle Sport - Leavine Family Racing | 31 | 0 | 0 | 2 | 500 | 30th |
| 2017 | Monster Energy NASCAR Cup Series | Leavine Family Racing | 36 | 0 | 1 | 1 | 542 | 26th |
| 2018 | Monster Energy NASCAR Cup Series | Front Row Motorsports | 36 | 0 | 0 | 1 | 493 | 26th |
| 2019 | Monster Energy NASCAR Cup Series | Front Row Motorsports | 36 | 0 | 2 | 2 | 485 | 27th |
| 2020 | NASCAR Cup Series | Front Row Motorsports | 36 | 0 | 0 | 4 | 588 | 23rd |
| 2021 | NASCAR Cup Series | Front Row Motorsports | 36 | 1 | 2 | 5 | 2152 | 16th |
| 2022 | NASCAR Cup Series | Front Row Motorsports | 36 | 0 | 2 | 12 | 663 | 23rd |
| 2023 | NASCAR Cup Series | Front Row Motorsports | 36 | 1 | 2 | 8 | 2185 | 15th |
| 2024 | NASCAR Cup Series | Front Row Motorsports | 36 | 0 | 2 | 7 | 624 | 23rd |
| 2025 | NASCAR Xfinity Series | Kaulig Racing | 1 | 0 | 0 | 0 | 0 | NC† |
| 2025 | NASCAR Craftsman Truck Series | Spire Motorsports | 2 | 0 | 0 | 0 | 0 | NC† |
| 2025 | NASCAR Cup Series | Spire Motorsports | 36 | 0 | 3 | 6 | 734 | 22nd |
| 2026 | NASCAR Craftsman Truck Series | Spire Motorsports | 1 | 0 | 0 | 0 | 0 | NC† |
| 2026 | NASCAR Cup Series | Spire Motorsports | 33 | 0 | 3 | 6 | 615* | 20th* |

^{†} As McDowell was a guest driver, he was ineligible for championship points.

=== American Open-Wheel series ===
(key)

==== Champ Car ====
Champ Car results
| Year | Team | No. | 1 | 2 | 3 | 4 | 5 | 6 | 7 | 8 | 9 | 10 | 11 | 12 | 13 | Rank | Points | Ref |
|---|---|---|---|---|---|---|---|---|---|---|---|---|---|---|---|---|---|---|
| 2005 | Rocketsports Racing | 31 | LBH | MTY | MIL | POR | CLE | TOR | EDM | SJO | DEN | MTL | LVS | SRF; 12 | MXC; 11 | **21st** | **19** | |

=== NASCAR ===
(key) (Bold – Pole position awarded by qualifying time. Italics – Pole position earned by points standings or practice time. * – Most laps led.)

==== Cup Series ====
NASCAR Cup Series results
| Year | Team | No. | Make | 1 | 2 | 3 | 4 | 5 | 6 | 7 | 8 | 9 | 10 | 11 | 12 | 13 | 14 | 15 | 16 | 17 | 18 | 19 | 20 | 21 | 22 | 23 | 24 | 25 | 26 | 27 | 28 | 29 | 30 | 31 | 32 | 33 | 34 | 35 | 36 | NCSC | Pts | Ref |
|---|---|---|---|---|---|---|---|---|---|---|---|---|---|---|---|---|---|---|---|---|---|---|---|---|---|---|---|---|---|---|---|---|---|---|---|---|---|---|---|---|---|---|
| 2008 | Michael Waltrip Racing | 00 | Toyota | DAY | CAL | LVS | ATL | BRI | MAR; 26 | TEX; 33 | PHO; 34 | TAL; 26 | RCH; 40 | DAR; 28 | CLT; 32 | DOV; 30 | POC; 27 | MCH; 37 | SON; 21 | NHA; 42 | DAY; 25 | CHI; 43 | IND; 34 | POC; 24 | GLN; 25 | MCH | BRI | CAL | RCH; 20 | NHA; 27 | DOV; 29 | KAN; DNQ | TAL | CLT | MAR | ATL | TEX | PHO | HOM | 40th | 1466 | |
| 2009 | Prism Motorsports | 66 | Toyota | DAY | CAL | LVS | ATL | BRI | MAR | TEX | PHO | TAL; DNQ | RCH | DAR | CLT | DOV | POC | MCH | SON | NHA | DAY | CHI | IND | POC | GLN | MCH | BRI | ATL | | | | | | | | | | | | 52nd | 326 | |
| 2009 | Tommy Baldwin Racing | 36 | Toyota | | | | | | | | | | | | | | | | | | | | | | | | | | RCH; 41 | NHA; 41 | DOV; 38 | KAN; DNQ | CAL; 40 | CLT; DNQ | MAR; 41 | TAL | TEX; 41 | PHO; 41 | HOM; 43 | 52nd | 326 | |
| 2010 | Prism Motorsports | 55 | Toyota | DAY; 33 | CAL; 42 | LVS; 42 | ATL; 42 | BRI | MAR; 43 | | | | RCH; DNQ | DAR; 40 | DOV; 42 | CLT; 42 | POC; 39 | MCH | SON | NHA; 41 | DAY; DNQ | CHI; DNQ | IND; 42 | POC; 43 | GLN; 42 | MCH; 42 | BRI; 43 | | | | | | | | | | | | | 45th | 870 | |
| 2010 | Prism Motorsports | 66 | Toyota | | | | | | | PHO; 43 | TEX; 41 | TAL | | | | | | | | | | | | | | | | | | | | | | | | | | | | 45th | 870 | |
| 2010 | Whitney Motorsports | 46 | Chevy | | | | | | | | | | | | | | | | | | | | | | | | | ATL; 39 | | | | KAN; 40 | CAL; 39 | CLT; 39 | | TAL; 35 | TEX; DNQ | PHO; DNQ | HOM; DNQ | 45th | 870 | |
| 2010 | Whitney Motorsports | 46 | Dodge | | | | | | | | | | | | | | | | | | | | | | | | | | RCH; DNQ | NHA; 43 | DOV; 39 | | | | MAR; DNQ | | | | | 45th | 870 | |
| 2011 | HP Racing | 66 | Toyota | DAY; DNQ | PHO; 41 | LVS; 41 | BRI; 43 | CAL; 43 | MAR; 32 | TEX; 40 | TAL; DNQ | RCH; 40 | DAR; 43 | DOV; 43 | CLT; 39 | KAN; 41 | POC; 41 | MCH; 43 | SON; 30 | DAY; 42 | KEN; 41 | NHA; 40 | IND; 37 | POC | GLN; 41 | MCH | BRI; 39 | ATL; 41 | RCH; 39 | CHI; 43 | NHA; 37 | DOV; 40 | KAN; 39 | CLT; 39 | TAL; 40 | MAR; 39 | TEX; QL^{†} | PHO; 40 | HOM; 43 | 36th | 139 | |
| 2011 | Joe Gibbs Racing | 18 | Toyota | | | | | | | | | | | | | | | | | | | | | | | | | | | | | | | | | | TEX; 33 | | | 36th | 139 | |
| 2012 | Phil Parsons Racing | 98 | Ford | DAY; 30 | PHO; 43 | LVS; 38 | BRI; 31 | CAL; 38 | MAR; 40 | TEX; 41 | KAN; 40 | RCH; 39 | TAL; 43 | DAR; DNQ | CLT; 36 | DOV; 42 | POC; 34 | MCH; 38 | SON | KEN; 38 | DAY; 43 | NHA; 40 | IND; DNQ | POC | GLN; 37 | MCH | BRI; 23 | ATL; DNQ | RCH; 41 | CHI; 43 | NHA; 37 | DOV; 38 | TAL; 31 | CLT; 31 | KAN; 43 | MAR; 39 | TEX; 38 | PHO; 38 | HOM; 41 | 37th | 187 | |
| 2013 | Phil Parsons Racing | 98 | Ford | DAY; 9 | PHO | LVS; 43 | BRI; 42 | CAL; 42 | MAR; 43 | TEX; 43 | KAN; 42 | RCH; 41 | TAL; 21 | DAR; 42 | CLT; 42 | DOV; 42 | POC; 40 | MCH; 42 | SON | KEN; 38 | DAY; 42 | NHA; 42 | IND; 32 | POC; 40 | | | BRI; 41 | ATL; 42 | RCH; 43 | CHI; 43 | | DOV; 43 | KAN; 38 | CLT; 40 | TAL; 15 | MAR; 26 | TEX; 43 | PHO; 32 | HOM; 43 | 37th | 210 | |
| 2013 | Front Row Motorsports | 35 | Ford | | | | | | | | | | | | | | | | | | | | | | GLN; 38 | MCH | | | | | | | | | | | | | | 37th | 210 | |
| 2013 | HScott Motorsports | 51 | Chevy | | | | | | | | | | | | | | | | | | | | | | | | | | | | NHA; 30 | | | | | | | | | 37th | 210 | |
| 2014 | Leavine Family Racing | 95 | Ford | DAY; DNQ | PHO; 33 | LVS; 43 | BRI; 37 | CAL | MAR; 37 | TEX; 30 | DAR | RCH; DNQ | TAL; 36 | KAN | CLT; 30 | DOV | POC | MCH | SON; 24 | KEN | DAY; 7 | NHA | IND; 26 | POC | GLN; 42 | MCH | BRI; 18 | ATL; DNQ | RCH | CHI; 32 | NHA | DOV | KAN; 35 | CLT; 29 | TAL; 41 | MAR | TEX; 30 | PHO; 31 | HOM; 21 | 37th | 255 | |
| 2015 | Leavine Family Racing | 95 | Ford | DAY; 31 | ATL; 27 | LVS; 30 | PHO | CAL | MAR | TEX; 31 | BRI; 22 | RCH | TAL; DNQ | KAN; 36 | CLT; 30 | DOV | POC | MCH | SON; 34 | DAY; DNQ | KEN; DNQ | NHA | IND; 31 | POC | GLN; 20 | MCH | BRI; 31 | DAR | RCH; 42 | CHI; DNQ | NHA | DOV | CLT; 31 | KAN | TAL; 28 | MAR | TEX; 34 | PHO | HOM; 33 | 39th | 213 | |
| 2016 | Circle Sport – Leavine Family Racing | 59 | Chevy | DAY; 15 | | | | | | | | | | | | | | | | | | | | | | | | | | | | | | | | | | | HOM; 10 | 30th | 500 | |
| 2016 | Circle Sport – Leavine Family Racing | 95 | Chevy | | ATL; 33 | LVS; 29 | PHO; 26 | CAL; 31 | MAR; 24 | TEX | BRI; 29 | RCH; 31 | TAL; 21 | KAN; 28 | DOV; 20 | CLT; 34 | POC | MCH | SON; 39 | DAY; 10 | KEN | NHA; 39 | IND; 23 | POC; 23 | GLN; 17 | BRI; 19 | MCH; 31 | DAR; 27 | RCH; 12 | CHI; 37 | NHA; 26 | DOV | CLT; 14 | KAN; 22 | TAL; 16 | MAR; 18 | TEX; 23 | PHO; 34 | | 30th | 500 | |
| 2017 | Leavine Family Racing | 95 | Chevy | DAY; 15 | ATL; 29 | LVS; 18 | PHO; 24 | CAL; 33 | MAR; 26 | TEX; 23 | BRI; 26 | RCH; 29 | TAL; 34 | KAN; 13 | CLT; 19 | DOV; 19 | POC; 24 | MCH; 23 | SON; 14 | DAY; 4 | KEN; 23 | NHA; 26 | IND; 18 | POC; 18 | GLN; 12 | MCH; 27 | BRI; 20 | DAR; 19 | RCH; 16 | CHI; 30 | NHA; 23 | DOV; 27 | CLT; 35 | TAL; 30 | KAN; 18 | MAR; 19 | TEX; 21 | PHO; 22 | HOM; 24 | 26th | 542 | |
| 2018 | Front Row Motorsports | 34 | Ford | DAY; 9 | ATL; 24 | LVS; 37 | PHO; 32 | CAL; 26 | MAR; 21 | TEX; 14 | BRI; 38 | RCH; 31 | TAL; 32 | DOV; 22 | KAN; 20 | CLT; 18 | POC; 21 | MCH; 25 | SON; 21 | CHI; 21 | DAY; 26 | KEN; 24 | NHA; 26 | POC; 16 | GLN; 18 | MCH; 25 | BRI; 37 | DAR; 20 | IND; 17 | LVS; 29 | RCH; 24 | ROV; 18 | DOV; 26 | TAL; 40 | KAN; 27 | MAR; 25 | TEX; 29 | PHO; 16 | HOM; 28 | 26th | 493 | |
| 2019 | Front Row Motorsports | 34 | Ford | DAY; 5 | ATL; 37 | LVS; 30 | PHO; 36 | CAL; 24 | MAR; 31 | TEX; 15 | BRI; 28 | RCH; 36 | TAL; 40 | DOV; 24 | KAN; 26 | CLT; 22 | POC; 20 | MCH; 27 | SON; 25 | CHI; 20 | DAY; 13 | KEN; 25 | NHA; 17 | POC; 25 | GLN; 16 | MCH; 22 | BRI; 37 | DAR; 38 | IND; 17 | LVS; 24 | RCH; 21 | ROV; 12 | DOV; 24 | TAL; 5 | KAN; 24 | MAR; 23 | TEX; 25 | PHO; 30 | HOM; 26 | 27th | 485 | |
| 2020 | Front Row Motorsports | 34 | Ford | DAY; 14 | LVS; 36 | CAL; 22 | PHO; 16 | DAR; 23 | DAR; 17 | CLT; 18 | CLT; 25 | BRI; 14 | ATL; 24 | MAR; 14 | HOM; 15 | TAL; 18 | POC; 8 | POC; 40 | IND; 7 | KEN; 24 | TEX; 15 | KAN; 16 | NHA; 19 | MCH; 29 | MCH; 28 | DRC; 10 | DOV; 26 | DOV; 25 | DAY; 14 | DAR; 16 | RCH; 25 | BRI; 10 | LVS; 21 | TAL; 36 | ROV; 32 | KAN; 19 | TEX; 26 | MAR; 28 | PHO; 23 | 23rd | 588 | |
| 2021 | Front Row Motorsports | 34 | Ford | DAY; 1 | DRC; 8 | HOM; 6 | LVS; 17 | PHO; 23 | ATL; 19 | BRD; 12 | MAR; 31 | RCH; 27 | TAL; 3 | KAN; 13 | DAR; 27 | DOV; 25 | COA; 7 | CLT; 20 | SON; 28 | NSH; 16 | POC; 19 | POC; 17 | ROA; 30 | ATL; 27 | NHA; 25 | GLN; 21 | IRC; 30 | MCH; 20 | DAY; 39 | DAR; 37 | RCH; 28 | BRI; 24 | LVS; 21 | TAL; 17 | ROV; 16 | TEX; 17 | KAN; 16 | MAR; 26 | PHO; 24 | 16th | 2152 | |
| 2022 | Front Row Motorsports | 34 | Ford | DAY; 7 | CAL; 31 | LVS; 27 | PHO; 27 | ATL; 24 | COA; 13 | RCH; 30 | MAR; 25 | BRD; 9 | TAL; 8 | DOV; 17 | DAR; 7 | KAN; 23 | CLT; 8 | GTW; 18 | SON; 3 | NSH; 13 | ROA; 8 | ATL; 15 | NHA; 28 | POC; 6 | IRC; 8 | MCH; 28 | RCH; 29 | GLN; 6 | DAY; 32 | DAR; 6 | KAN; 16 | BRI; 11 | TEX; 11 | TAL; 3 | ROV; 27 | LVS; 19 | HOM; 16 | MAR; 17 | PHO; 25 | 23rd | 663 | |
| 2023 | Front Row Motorsports | 34 | Ford | DAY; 28 | CAL; 18 | LVS; 25 | PHO; 13 | ATL; 21 | COA; 12 | RCH; 6 | BRD; 11 | MAR; 19 | TAL; 35 | DOV; 22 | KAN; 26 | DAR; 33 | CLT; 28 | GTW; 9 | SON; 7 | NSH; 28 | CSC; 7 | ATL; 4 | NHA; 13 | POC; 19 | RCH; 22 | MCH; 24 | IRC; 1* | GLN; 36 | DAY; 13 | DAR; 32 | KAN; 26 | BRI; 6 | TEX; 15 | TAL; 21 | ROV; 32 | LVS; 17 | HOM; 22 | MAR; 25 | PHO; 9 | 15th | 2185 | |
| 2024 | Front Row Motorsports | 34 | Ford | DAY; 36 | **ATL**; 8 | LVS; 25 | PHO; 8 | BRI; 11 | COA; 38 | RCH; 26 | MAR; 21 | TEX; 35 | **TAL**; 31* | DOV; 36 | KAN; 10 | DAR; 10 | CLT; 16 | **GTW**; 25 | SON; 2 | IOW; 23 | NHA; 15 | NSH; 35 | CSC; 5 | POC; 24 | IND; 16 | RCH; 15 | MCH; 19 | **DAY**; 30 | DAR; 28 | **ATL**; 22 | GLN; 7 | BRI; 11 | KAN; 29 | **TAL**; 37 | ROV; 15 | LVS; 20 | HOM; 14 | MAR; 33 | PHO; 31 | 23rd | 624 | |
| 2025 | Spire Motorsports | 71 | Chevy | DAY; 11 | ATL; 13 | COA; 11 | PHO; 27 | **LVS**; 16 | HOM; 20 | MAR; 12 | DAR; 29 | BRI; 30 | TAL; 11 | TEX; 26 | KAN; 23 | CLT; 7 | NSH; 21 | MCH; 30 | MXC; 5 | POC; 35 | ATL; 18 | CSC; 32* | SON; 4 | DOV; 13 | IND; 30 | IOW; 27 | GLN; 19 | RCH; 17 | DAY; 12 | DAR; 33 | GTW; 14 | BRI; 17 | NHA; 8 | KAN; 14 | ROV; 5 | LVS; 16 | **TAL**; 17 | MAR; 24 | PHO; 8 | 22nd | 734 | |
| 2026 | Spire Motorsports | 71 | Chevy | DAY; 22 | ATL; 20 | COA; 5 | PHO; 9 | LVS; 26 | DAR; 20 | MAR; 18 | BRI; 24 | KAN; 34 | TAL; 32 | TEX; 27 | GLN; 2 | CLT; 14 | NSH; 15 | MCH; 26 | POC; 17 | COR; 10 | SON; 9 | CHI; 29 | ATL; 15 | NWS; 24 | IND; 18 | IOW; 25 | RCH; 28 | NHA; 16 | DAY; 4 | DAR; 17 | GTW; 20 | BRI; 21 | KAN; 27 | LVS; 21 | CLT; 19 | PHO; 36 | TAL; 10 | MAR; 16 | HOM; 10 | 20th | 691 | |
^{†} – Qualified but replaced by Josh Wise. McDowell changed teams after NASCAR parked Kyle Busch.

===== Daytona 500 =====
| Year | Team | Manufacturer | Start | Finish |
|---|---|---|---|---|
| 2010 | Prism Motorsports | Toyota | 29 | 33 |
| 2011 | HP Racing | Toyota | DNQ | |
| 2012 | Phil Parsons Racing | Ford | 11 | 30 |
| 2013 | Phil Parsons Racing | Ford | 38 | 9 |
| 2014 | Leavine Family Racing | Ford | DNQ | |
| 2015 | Leavine Family Racing | Ford | 23 | 31 |
| 2016 | Circle Sport – Leavine Family Racing | Chevrolet | 39 | 15 |
| 2017 | Leavine Family Racing | Chevrolet | 22 | 15 |
| 2018 | Front Row Motorsports | Ford | 22 | 9 |
| 2019 | Front Row Motorsports | Ford | 34 | 5 |
| 2020 | Front Row Motorsports | Ford | 26 | 14 |
| 2021 | Front Row Motorsports | Ford | 17 | **1** |
| 2022 | Front Row Motorsports | Ford | 6 | 7 |
| 2023 | Front Row Motorsports | Ford | 11 | 28 |
| 2024 | Front Row Motorsports | Ford | 2 | 36 |
| 2025 | Spire Motorsports | Chevrolet | 25 | 11 |
| 2026 | Spire Motorsports | Chevrolet | 10 | 22 |

==== Xfinity Series ====
NASCAR Xfinity Series results
| Year | Team | No. | Make | 1 | 2 | 3 | 4 | 5 | 6 | 7 | 8 | 9 | 10 | 11 | 12 | 13 | 14 | 15 | 16 | 17 | 18 | 19 | 20 | 21 | 22 | 23 | 24 | 25 | 26 | 27 | 28 | 29 | 30 | 31 | 32 | 33 | 34 | 35 | NXSC | Pts | Ref |
|---|---|---|---|---|---|---|---|---|---|---|---|---|---|---|---|---|---|---|---|---|---|---|---|---|---|---|---|---|---|---|---|---|---|---|---|---|---|---|---|---|---|
| 2007 | Michael Waltrip Racing | 00 | Toyota | DAY | CAL | MXC | LVS | ATL | BRI | NSH | TEX | PHO | TAL | RCH | DAR | CLT | DOV | NSH | KEN | MLW | NHA | DAY | CHI | GTY | IRP | CGV | GLN | MCH | BRI | CAL | RCH | DOV | KAN | CLT | MEM | TEX; 20 | PHO; 14 | HOM; 32 | 94th | 291 | |
| 2008 | Michael Waltrip Racing | 00 | Toyota | DAY; 27 | CAL | LVS | ATL | BRI | NSH | TEX | PHO | MXC | TAL | RCH | DAR | CLT | DOV | NSH | KEN | MLW | NHA | DAY | CHI | GTY | IRP | CGV | | | | | | | | | | | | | 112th | 119 | |
| 2008 | MSRP Motorsports | 91 | Chevy | | | | | | | | | | | | | | | | | | | | | | | | GLN; 42 | MCH | BRI | CAL | RCH | DOV | KAN | CLT | MEM | TEX | PHO | HOM | 112th | 119 | |
| 2009 | JTG Daugherty Racing | 47 | Toyota | DAY; 14 | CAL; 36 | LVS; 6 | BRI; 31 | TEX; 17 | NSH; 15 | PHO; 11 | TAL; 15 | RCH; 8 | DAR; 33 | CLT; 20 | DOV; 11 | NSH; 8 | KEN; 29 | MLW; 14 | NHA; 15 | DAY; 13 | | | | | | | | | | | | KAN; 39 | | | | | | | 13th | 3449 | |
| 2009 | MacDonald Motorsports | 81 | Dodge | | | | | | | | | | | | | | | | | | CHI; 25 | GTY; 32 | IRP; 28 | | | | | | | | | | | | | | | | 13th | 3449 | |
| 2009 | Whitney Motorsports | 26 | Dodge | | | | | | | | | | | | | | | | | | | | | IOW; 8 | GLN; 27 | MCH; 17 | BRI; 10 | | | RCH; 19 | | | CAL; 38 | | | | | | 13th | 3449 | |
| 2009 | Whitney Motorsports | 96 | Dodge | | | | | | | | | | | | | | | | | | | | | | | | | CGV; 11 | ATL; 35 | | DOV; 29 | KAN; DNQ | | CLT; 23 | MEM; 21 | TEX; 29 | PHO; 25 | HOM | 13th | 3449 | |
| 2010 | MacDonald Motorsports | 81 | Dodge | DAY; 24 | CAL; 21 | LVS; 39 | BRI; 18 | NSH; 37 | PHO; 18 | TEX; 26 | TAL; 23 | RCH; 29 | DAR; 19 | DOV; 30 | CLT; 20 | NSH; 30 | KEN; 28 | ROA; 33 | NHA; 20 | DAY; 35 | CHI; 35 | GTY; DNQ | IRP; 20 | IOW; 13 | GLN; 10 | MCH; 28 | BRI; 20 | CGV; 37 | ATL; 27 | RCH; 37 | DOV; 28 | KAN; 19 | CAL; 18 | CLT; 26 | GTY; 30 | TEX; 36 | PHO; 26 | HOM; DNQ | 21st | 2770 | |
| 2011 | Joe Gibbs Racing | 18 | Toyota | DAY | PHO | LVS | BRI | CAL | TEX | TAL | NSH | RCH | DAR | DOV | IOW; 7 | CLT | CHI | MCH | **ROA**; 12 | DAY | KEN | NHA | NSH | IRP; 10 | IOW; 9 | GLN | CGV; 3 | BRI | ATL | RCH | CHI | DOV | KAN | CLT | TEX | PHO | HOM | | 106th | 0^{1} | |
| 2012 | Joe Gibbs Racing | 18 | Toyota | DAY | PHO | LVS | BRI | CAL | TEX | RCH | TAL | DAR | IOW; 3 | CLT | DOV | | ROA; 2 | KEN | DAY | NHA | CHI | IND | IOW; 6 | GLN | CGV; 6 | BRI | ATL | RCH | CHI | KEN | | | | | | | | | 111th | 0^{1} | |
| 2012 | Joe Gibbs Racing | 20 | Toyota | | | | | | | | | | | | | MCH; 7 | | | | | | | | | | | | | | | | | | | | | | | 111th | 0^{1} | |
| 2012 | SR² Motorsports | 00 | Toyota | | | | | | | | | | | | | | | | | | | | | | | | | | | | DOV; 40 | CLT | KAN | TEX | PHO | HOM | | | 111th | 0^{1} | |
| 2013 | SR² Motorsports | 27 | Toyota | DAY | PHO | LVS | BRI; 40 | CAL; 36 | | | | | | | | | | | | | | | | | | | | | | | | | | | | | | | 100th | 0^{1} | |
| 2013 | SR² Motorsports | 00 | Toyota | | | | | | TEX; DNQ | RCH; 22 | TAL | DAR | CLT | DOV | IOW | MCH | | | | | | | | | | BRI; DNQ | ATL | RCH | CHI | KEN | DOV | KAN | CLT | | | | | | 100th | 0^{1} | |
| 2013 | Joe Gibbs Racing | 18 | Toyota | | | | | | | | | | | | | | ROA; 34 | KEN | DAY | NHA | CHI | IND | IOW | GLN | **MOH**; 2 | | | | | | | | | | | | | | 100th | 0^{1} | |
| 2013 | TriStar Motorsports | 10 | Toyota | | | | | | | | | | | | | | | | | | | | | | | | | | | | | | | TEX; 40 | PHO | | | | 100th | 0^{1} | |
| 2013 | TriStar Motorsports | 91 | Toyota | | | | | | | | | | | | | | | | | | | | | | | | | | | | | | | | | HOM; 40 | | | 100th | 0^{1} | |
| 2014 | Joe Gibbs Racing | 20 | Toyota | DAY | PHO | LVS | BRI | CAL | TEX | DAR | RCH | TAL | IOW; 7 | CLT | DOV | MCH | ROA | KEN | DAY | NHA | CHI | IND | IOW; 2 | GLN | MOH | BRI | ATL | RCH | CHI | | | | | | | | | | 87th | 0^{1} | |
| 2014 | Team Penske | 22 | Ford | | | | | | | | | | | | | | | | | | | | | | | | | | | KEN; 8 | DOV | KAN | CLT | TEX | PHO | HOM | | | 87th | 0^{1} | |
| 2016 | Richard Childress Racing | 2 | Chevy | DAY | ATL | LVS | PHO | CAL | TEX | BRI | RCH | TAL | DOV | CLT | POC | MCH | IOW | DAY | KEN | NHA | IND | IOW | GLN | MOH | BRI | ROA; 1* | DAR | RCH | CHI | KEN | DOV | CLT | KAN | TEX | PHO | HOM | | | 93rd | 0^{1} | |
| 2025 | Kaulig Racing | 11 | Chevy | DAY | ATL | COA | PHO | LVS | HOM | MAR | DAR | BRI | CAR | TAL | TEX | CLT | NSH | MXC | POC | ATL | CSC | SON | DOV | IND | IOW | GLN; 25 | DAY | PIR | GTW | BRI | KAN | ROV | LVS | TAL | MAR | PHO | | | 99th | 0^{1} | |

==== Craftsman Truck Series ====
NASCAR Craftsman Truck Series results
| Year | Team | No. | Make | 1 | 2 | 3 | 4 | 5 | 6 | 7 | 8 | 9 | 10 | 11 | 12 | 13 | 14 | 15 | 16 | 17 | 18 | 19 | 20 | 21 | 22 | 23 | 24 | 25 | NCTC | Pts | Ref |
|---|---|---|---|---|---|---|---|---|---|---|---|---|---|---|---|---|---|---|---|---|---|---|---|---|---|---|---|---|---|---|---|
| 2007 | Darrell Waltrip Motorsports | 17 | Toyota | DAY | CAL | ATL | MAR | KAN | LOW | MFD | DOV | TEX | MCH | MLW | MEM | KEN | IRP | NSH | BRI | GTW | NHA | LVS | TAL | MAR; 30 | ATL | TEX | PHO | HOM | 117th | 0 | |
| 2009 | ThorSport Racing | 98 | Chevy | DAY | CAL | ATL | MAR | KAN | CLT | DOV | TEX | MCH | MLW | MEM | KEN | IRP | NSH | BRI | CHI | IOW | GTW | NHA; 14 | LVS | MAR | TAL | TEX | PHO | HOM | 111th | 0 | |
| 2025 | Spire Motorsports | 07 | Chevy | DAY; 26 | ATL; 12 | LVS | HOM | MAR | BRI | CAR | TEX | KAN | NWS | CLT | NSH | MCH | POC | LRP | IRP | GLN | RCH | DAR | BRI | NHA | ROV | TAL | MAR | PHO | 92nd | 0^{1} | |
| 2026 | Spire Motorsports | 7 | Chevy | DAY; 24* | ATL | STP | DAR | CAR | BRI | TEX | GLN | DOV | CLT | NSS | MCH | COR | LRP | NWS | IRP | RCH | NHA | BRI | KAN | CLT | PHO | TAL | MAR | HOM | 115th | 0^{1} | |

^{*} Season still in progress
^{1} Ineligible for series points

=== ARCA Re/Max Series ===
(key) (Bold – Pole position awarded by qualifying time. Italics – Pole position earned by points standings or practice time. * – Most laps led.)

ARCA Re/Max Series results
| Year | Team | No. | Make | 1 | 2 | 3 | 4 | 5 | 6 | 7 | 8 | 9 | 10 | 11 | 12 | 13 | 14 | 15 | 16 | 17 | 18 | 19 | 20 | 21 | 22 | 23 | ARSC | Pts | Ref |
|---|---|---|---|---|---|---|---|---|---|---|---|---|---|---|---|---|---|---|---|---|---|---|---|---|---|---|---|---|---|
| 2006 | Hixson Motorsports | 2 | Dodge | DAY | NSH | SLM | WIN | KEN | TOL | POC | MCH | KAN | KEN | BLN | POC | GTW | NSH | MCH | ISF | MIL; 34 | TOL | DSF | | | | | 40th | 965 | |
| 2006 | Eddie Sharp Racing | 2 | Dodge | | | | | | | | | | | | | | | | | | | | CHI; 38 | SLM; 6 | TAL; 5 | IOW; 4 | 40th | 965 | |
| 2007 | Eddie Sharp Racing | 2 | Dodge | DAY; 10 | USA; 18 | NSH; 33 | **SLM**; 3 | KAN; 11 | **WIN**; 22* | **KEN**; 39 | **TOL**; 7* | IOW; 2 | POC; 6 | | **BLN**; 2* | KEN; 1* | POC; 1 | **NSH**; 19 | ISF; 2 | **MIL**; 4 | GTW; 3* | DSF; 36 | **CHI**; 1* | SLM; 3 | TAL; 33 | **TOL**; 1* | 2nd | 5455 | |
| 2007 | Eddie Sharp Racing | 2 | Toyota | | | | | | | | | | | MCH; 8 | | | | | | | | | | | | | 2nd | 5455 | |

=== 24 Hours of Daytona ===
(key)

24 Hours of Daytona results
| Year | Class | No | Team | Car | Co-drivers | Laps | Position | Class Pos. |
|---|---|---|---|---|---|---|---|---|
| 2005 | DP | 19 | (United States) Ten Motorsports | BMW Riley DP | (Mexico) Memo Gidley (Canada) Michael Valiante (United States) Jonathan Bomarito | 465 | 42 | 19 |
| 2006 | DP | 19 | (United States) Playboy/Uniden Racing | Ford Crawford DP | (Mexico) Memo Gidley (United States) Alex Barron | 716 | 6 | 6 |
| 2007 | DP | 19 | (United States) Finlay Motorsports | Ford Crawford DP | (United States) Rob Finlay (Canada) Michael Valiante (United States) Bobby Labonte | 627 | 10 ^{DNF} | 10 ^{DNF} |
| 2008 | DP | 09 | (United States) Spirit of Daytona Racing | Porsche Fabcar DP | (United States) Guy Cosmo (Canada) Marc-Antoine Camirand | 652 | 15 | 10 |
| 2011 | DP | 6 | (United States) Michael Shank Racing | Ford Dallara DP | (United States) A. J. Allmendinger (United Kingdom) Justin Wilson | 719 | 7 | 7 |
| 2012 | DP | 6 | (United States) Michael Shank Racing | Ford Dallara DP | (Venezuela) Jorge Goncalvez (Brazil) Felipe Nasr (Colombia) Gustavo Yacamán | 761 | 3 | 3 |

Achievements
| Preceded by Denny Hamlin | Daytona 500 Winner; 2021 | Succeeded by Austin Cindric |

Sporting positions
| Preceded by Luis Schiavo | Star Mazda Championship Champion; 2004 | Succeeded by Raphael Matos |
