= 2016 Road America 180 =

Stock car race in Wisconsin, United States

2016 Road America 180 Fired Up by Johnsonville
Race details
- Race 23 of 32 in the 2016 NASCAR Xfinity Series
- Date: August 27, 2016
- Official name: Seventh Annual Road America 180 Fired Up by Johnsonville
- Location: Road America, Elkhart Lake, Wisconsin
- Course: Permanent racing facility
- Course length: 4.048 miles (6.515 km)
- Distance: 48 laps, 194.304 mi (312.702 km)
- Scheduled distance: 45 laps, 182.16 mi (293.16 km)
- Average speed: 74.573 mph (120.014 km/h)

Pole position
Driver	Alex Tagliani	Team Penske
- Time: 2:12.641

Most laps led
Driver	Michael McDowell	Richard Childress Racing
- Laps: 24

Winner
No. 2	Michael McDowell	Richard Childress Racing

Television in the United States
- Network: NBC
- Announcers: Dave Burns, Dale Jarrett

Radio in the United States
- Radio: Motor Racing Network

The 2016 Road America 180 Fired Up by Johnsonville was the 23rd stock car race of the 2016 NASCAR Xfinity Series season, and the seventh iteration of the event. The race was held on Saturday, August 27, 2016, in Elkhart Lake, Wisconsin at Road America, a 4.048 miles (6.515 km) permanent road course. The race was extended from its scheduled 45 laps to 48 due to a green–white–checker finish. Michael McDowell, driving for Richard Childress Racing, came out victorious with the win, his first career NASCAR Xfinity Series win. Brennan Poole would end up finishing in third place, with Brendan Gaughan finishing in second place.

== Report ==
=== Background ===
The race was held at Road America, which is a motorsport road course located near Elkhart Lake, Wisconsin, United States on Wisconsin Highway 67. It has hosted races since the 1950s and currently hosts races in the NASCAR Cup and Xfinity Series, WeatherTech SportsCar Championship, IndyCar Series, SCCA Pirelli World Challenge, ASRA, AMA Superbike series, and SCCA Pro Racing's Trans-Am Series.

=== Entry list ===
- (R) denotes rookie driver.
- (i) denotes driver who is ineligible for series driver points.

#	Driver	Team	Make
0	Garrett Smithley	JD Motorsports	Chevrolet
01	Ryan Preece	JD Motorsports	Chevrolet
1	Elliott Sadler	JR Motorsports	Chevrolet
2	Michael McDowell (i)	Richard Childress Racing	Chevrolet
3	Ty Dillon	Richard Childress Racing	Chevrolet
4	Ross Chastain	JD Motorsports	Chevrolet
6	Bubba Wallace	Roush Fenway Racing	Ford
07	Ray Black Jr.	SS-Green Light Racing	Chevrolet
7	Justin Allgaier	JR Motorsports	Chevrolet
10	Jeff Green	TriStar Motorsports	Toyota
11	Blake Koch	Kaulig Racing	Chevrolet
13	Alon Day	MBM Motorsports	Toyota
14	Tomy Drissi	TriStar Motorsports	Toyota
15	Scott Heckert	B. J. McLeod Motorsports	Ford
16	Ryan Reed	Roush Fenway Racing	Ford
18	Owen Kelly	Joe Gibbs Racing	Toyota
19	Daniel Suárez	Joe Gibbs Racing	Toyota
20	Erik Jones	Joe Gibbs Racing	Toyota
22	Alex Tagliani	Team Penske	Ford
25	Alex Kennedy (i)	Team Kapusta Racing	Chevrolet
28	Dakoda Armstrong	JGL Racing	Toyota
33	Brandon Jones	Richard Childress Racing	Chevrolet
39	Ryan Sieg	RSS Racing	Chevrolet
40	John Jackson	MBM Motorsports	Dodge
42	Justin Marks	Chip Ganassi Racing	Chevrolet
48	Brennan Poole	Chip Ganassi Racing	Chevrolet
51	Jeremy Clements	Jeremy Clements Racing	Chevrolet
52	Joey Gase	Jimmy Means Racing	Chevrolet
62	Brendan Gaughan	Richard Childress Racing	Chevrolet
70	Timmy Hill	Derrike Cope Racing	Chevrolet
74	Nic Hammann	Mike Harmon Racing	Chevrolet
77	Josh Bilicki	Obaika Racing	Chevrolet
78	B. J. McLeod	B. J. McLeod Motorsports	Chevrolet
88	Kenny Habul	JR Motorsports	Chevrolet
89	Morgan Shepherd	Shepherd Racing Ventures	Chevrolet
90	JD Davison	DGM Racing	Chevrolet
93	David Starr	RSS Racing	Chevrolet
97	Paige Decker	Obaika Racing	Chevrolet
99	Stanton Barrett	B. J. McLeod Motorsports	Ford
Official entry list

== Practice ==
=== First practice ===
The first 55-minute practice session was held on Friday, August 26, at 9:00 AM CST. Michael McDowell, driving for Richard Childress Racing, would set the fastest time in the session, with a lap of 2:23.138 and an average speed of 108.847 mph (175.172 km/h).

Pos.	#	Driver	Team	Make	Time	Speed
1	2	Michael McDowell	Richard Childress Racing	Chevrolet	2:23.138	108.847
2	18	Owen Kelly	Joe Gibbs Racing	Toyota	2:23.155	108.839
3	22	Alex Tagliani	Team Penske	Ford	2:23.486	108.687
Full first practice results

=== Final practice ===
The final 55-minute practice session was held on Friday, August 26, at 11:00 AM CST. Justin Marks, driving for Chip Ganassi Racing, would set the fastest time in the session, with a lap of 2:29.076 and an average speed of 108.946 mph (175.332 km/h).

Pos.	#	Driver	Team	Make	Time	Speed
1	42	Justin Marks	Chip Ganassi Racing	Chevrolet	2:22.936	108.946
2	20	Michael McDowell	Richard Childress Racing	Chevrolet	2:23.015	108.907
3	22	Alex Tagliani	Team Penske	Ford	2:23.706	108.571
Full final practice results

== Qualifying ==
Qualifying was held on Friday, August 26, at 5:35 PM CST. Since Road America is a road course, the qualifying system is a two group system, with two rounds. Drivers will be separated into two groups, Group A and Group B. Each driver will have multiple laps to set a time. The fastest 5 drivers from each group will advance to the final round. The fastest driver to set a time in that round will win the pole. Alex Tagliani, driving for Team Penske, would score the pole for the race, with a lap of 2:12.641, and an average speed of 109.866 mph (176.812 km/h).

No one would fail to qualify for the race.

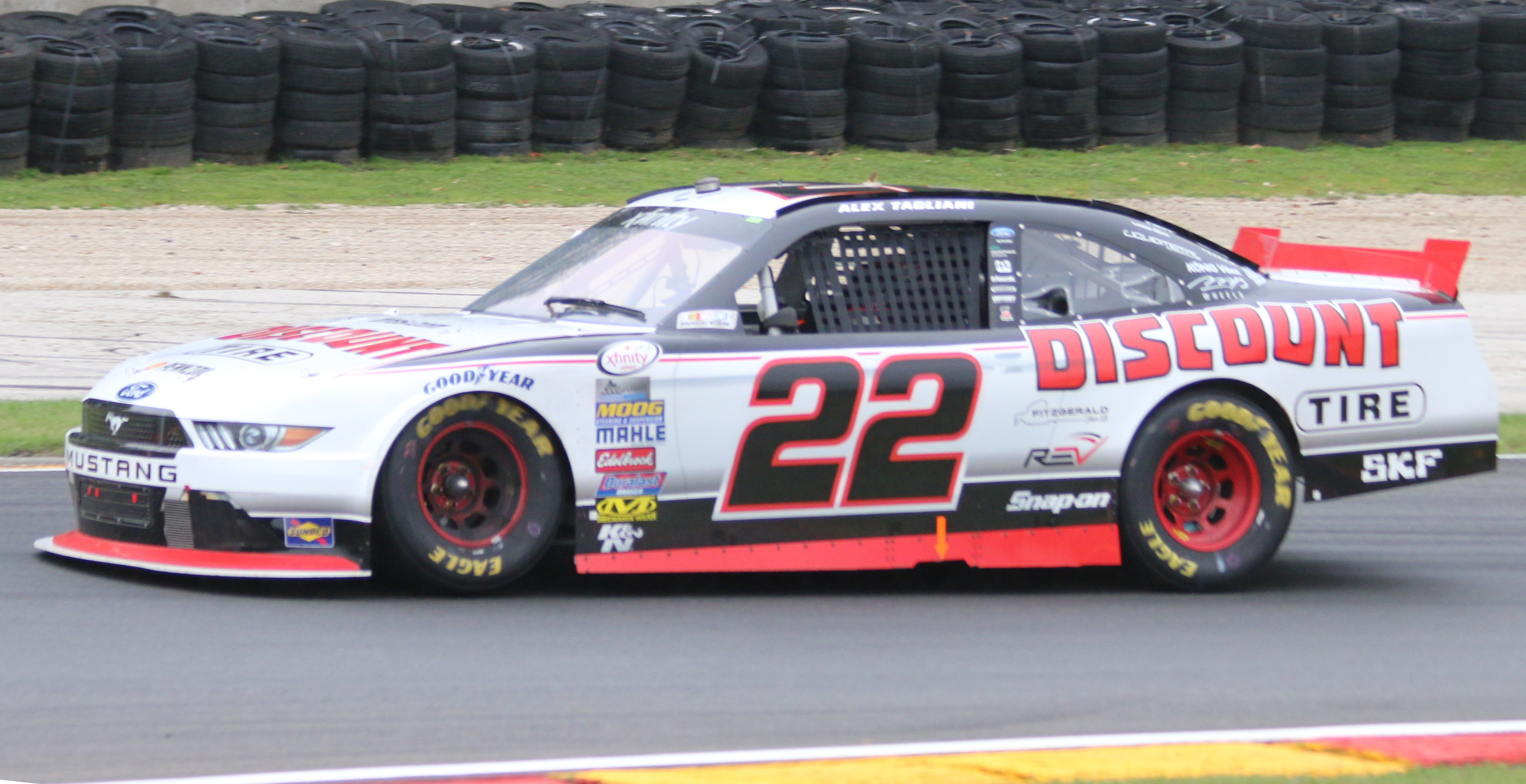
Alex Tagliani scored the pole for the race.

=== Qualifying results ===
Pos.	#	Driver	Team	Make	Time	Speed
1	22	Alex Tagliani	Team Penske	Ford	2:12.641	109.866
2	2	Michael McDowell	Richard Childress Racing	Toyota	2:12.974	109.591
3	42	Justin Marks	Chip Ganassi Racing	Chevrolet	2:13.455	109.196
Official qualifying results
Official starting lineup

== Race results ==
Fin	St	#	Driver	Team	Make	Laps	Led	Status	Pts
1	2	2	Michael McDowell	Richard Childress Racing	Chevrolet	48	24	Running	0
2	8	62	Brendan Gaughan	Richard Childress Racing	Chevrolet	48	2	Running	40
3	12	48	Brennan Poole	Chip Ganassi Racing	Chevrolet	48	0	Running	38

Previous race: 2016 Food City 300	NASCAR Xfinity Series; 2016 season	Next race: 2016 Sport Clips Haircuts VFW 200
