= Spire Motorsports =

NASCAR team

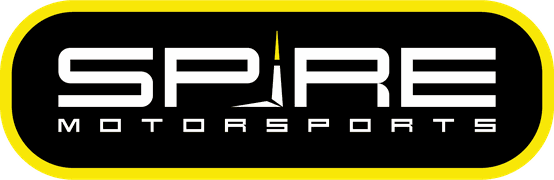
- Owner(s): Jeff Dickerson (Spire Holdings); Dan Towriss; Mark Walter (TWG Motorsports)
- Principal(s): Rob Edwards; Bill Anthony; Todd Mackin; Ryan Sparks
- Base: Mooresville, North Carolina
- Series: NASCAR Cup Series; NASCAR Craftsman Truck Series
- Race drivers: Cup Series; 7. Daniel Suárez; 71. Michael McDowell; 77. Carson Hocevar; Truck Series; 7. Tristan McKee, TBA; 77. Kasey Kahne
- Manufacturer: Chevrolet
- Opened: 2018
- Website: spire-motorsports.com

Career
- Debut: Cup Series: 2019 Daytona 500 (Daytona); Xfinity Series: 2023 Shriners Children's 200 (Darlington); Truck Series: 2022 NextEra Energy 250 (Daytona); ARCA Menards Series: 2025 Ride the 'Dente 200 (Daytona); ARCA Menards Series West: 2025 General Tire 150 (Phoenix)
- Latest race: Cup Series: 2026 Season Finale 400 (Homestead); Xfinity Series: 2023 Cabo Wabo Tequila 250 (Michigan); Truck Series: 2026 Craftsman 200 (Homestead); ARCA Menards Series: 2025 Reese's 150 (Kansas); ARCA Menards Series West: 2025 Desert Diamond Casino West Valley 100 (Phoenix)
- Races competed: Total: 394; Cup Series: 288; Xfinity Series: 4 Truck Series: 95; ARCA Series: 4 ARCA West Series: 3
- Drivers' Championships: Total: 0 Cup Series: 0 Xfinity Series: 0 Truck Series: 0 ARCA Series: 0 ARCA West Series: 0
- Race victories: Total: 17; Cup Series: 3 Xfinity Series: 0 Truck Series: 13; ARCA Series: 1 ARCA West Series: 0
- Pole positions: Total: 16; Cup Series: 5 Xfinity Series: 0 Truck Series: 11; ARCA Series: 0 ARCA West Series: 0

Spire Motorsports is an American professional stock car racing team. The organization competes in the NASCAR Cup Series and the NASCAR Craftsman Truck Series.

The company was founded in 2018 by professional management executives Jeff Dickerson and T. J. Puchyr as a subsidiary of their Spire Sports + Entertainment agency after purchasing an entry "charter" from Furniture Row Racing, beginning competition for the 2019 season. The team is considered by the Associated Press' Jenna Fryer to have helped "jump-start" a "dormant" charter system; charter values increased from about $6 million to $40 million USD in the period from 2018–2024. Additionally, the team would purchase the racing assets of Truck Series team Kyle Busch Motorsports in 2023. On track, the team would score their first Cup win in 2019 with driver Justin Haley. In 2024, the organization restructured, with both Spire Motorsports and SS+E becoming subsidiaries of Dickerson's Spire Holdings, and Puchyr selling his shares to financial services executive Dan Towriss, the CEO of TWG Motorsports.

In the Cup Series, the team fields three Chevrolet Camaro ZL1 teams: the No. 7 for Daniel Suárez, the No. 71 for Michael McDowell, and the No. 77 for Carson Hocevar. In the Truck Series, the team fields two Chevrolet Silverados: the No. 7 and No. 77.

== History ==
Spire Motorsports logo (2018–2024)

On December 4, 2018, Spire Sports + Entertainment announced they purchased their charter from the now-defunct Furniture Row Racing. At the same time, the team announced they will use the No. 77 and field Chevrolet Camaro ZL1s. FRR President Joe Garone joined the team to serve the same position.

The team, in its first year of operation, operated in the same shop as Premium Motorsports as part of an alliance with Premium owner Jay Robinson. However, Premium was sold to Rick Ware Racing in 2020, and the team operated out of the RWR shop until season's end. On August 11, 2020, Spire Motorsports purchased the assets of Leavine Family Racing, allowing them to expand to a two-car operation in 2021. Following the acquisition, the team moved their headquarters from Mooresville to the former shop of AK Racing in Concord, North Carolina. On October 7, it was announced that Spire Motorsports had secured a third charter which would be leased to Trackhouse Racing for the 2021 season. On December 10, it was reported that NASCAR on NBC analyst and former Hendrick Motorsports crew chief Steve Letarte will serve as a consultant for the team.

On June 18, 2021, it was announced that Spire had sold two charters (for the No. 77, and the one leased to Trackhouse Racing) to Kaulig Racing for the 2022 season. In the announcement, Spire's co-owners said, "We will continue to field the No. 7 with Corey LaJoie as a chartered entry in 2022. We remain committed to NASCAR and the Cup Series and we will continue to look for opportunities to grow and compete in the future." In 2022, Spire purchased Rick Ware Racing's No. 53 charter for the No. 77.

On September 16, 2023, Spire purchased Live Fast Motorsports charter for US$40 million to field a third team in 2024. Less than two weeks later, on September 27, Spire agreed to purchase the assets of NASCAR Truck Series team Kyle Busch Motorsports. On December 4, former Chip Ganassi Racing COO Doug Duchardt was named President of Spire Motorsports.

=== Restructuring ===
On November 25, 2024, former RFK Racing crew chief Matt McCall was named director of vehicle performance, while former Stewart–Haas Racing engineer Dax Gerringer was named technical director. On the same day, it was revealed through the launch of the Cadillac Formula 1 Team that Spire (which had carried sponsorship from related brands Gainbridge and Delaware Life throughout the season) was "owned and operated" by TWG Global, a company founded by billionaire Mark Walter. Among Walter's other sports properties at the time were the Los Angeles Dodgers, the Professional Women's Hockey League, and a minority share of Chelsea F.C.

Subsequent media reports would confirm Spire's ownership group as consisting of co-founder Jeff Dickerson and Dan Towriss, the CEO of TWG Motorsports, a subsidiary of TWG Global launched to operate its various motorsports properties (which, including Spire and Cadillac F1, also included Andretti Global and Wayne Taylor Racing). In June 2025, it was confirmed that Puchyr had sold his shares to Towriss in 2024, and had spent 2025 as a consultant for the Rick Ware Racing and Legacy Motor Club teams. In a March 2026 court filing, Dickerson confirmed that TWG Motorsports owns "a majority stake" in Spire.

In October 2025, Andretti Global COO Rob Edwards had transitioned to Chief Performance Officer (CPO) of TWG Motorsports, adding TWG's other racing series, including NASCAR, to his responsibilities.

== Cup Series ==
=== Car No. 7 history ===
==== Corey LaJoie (2021–2024) ====
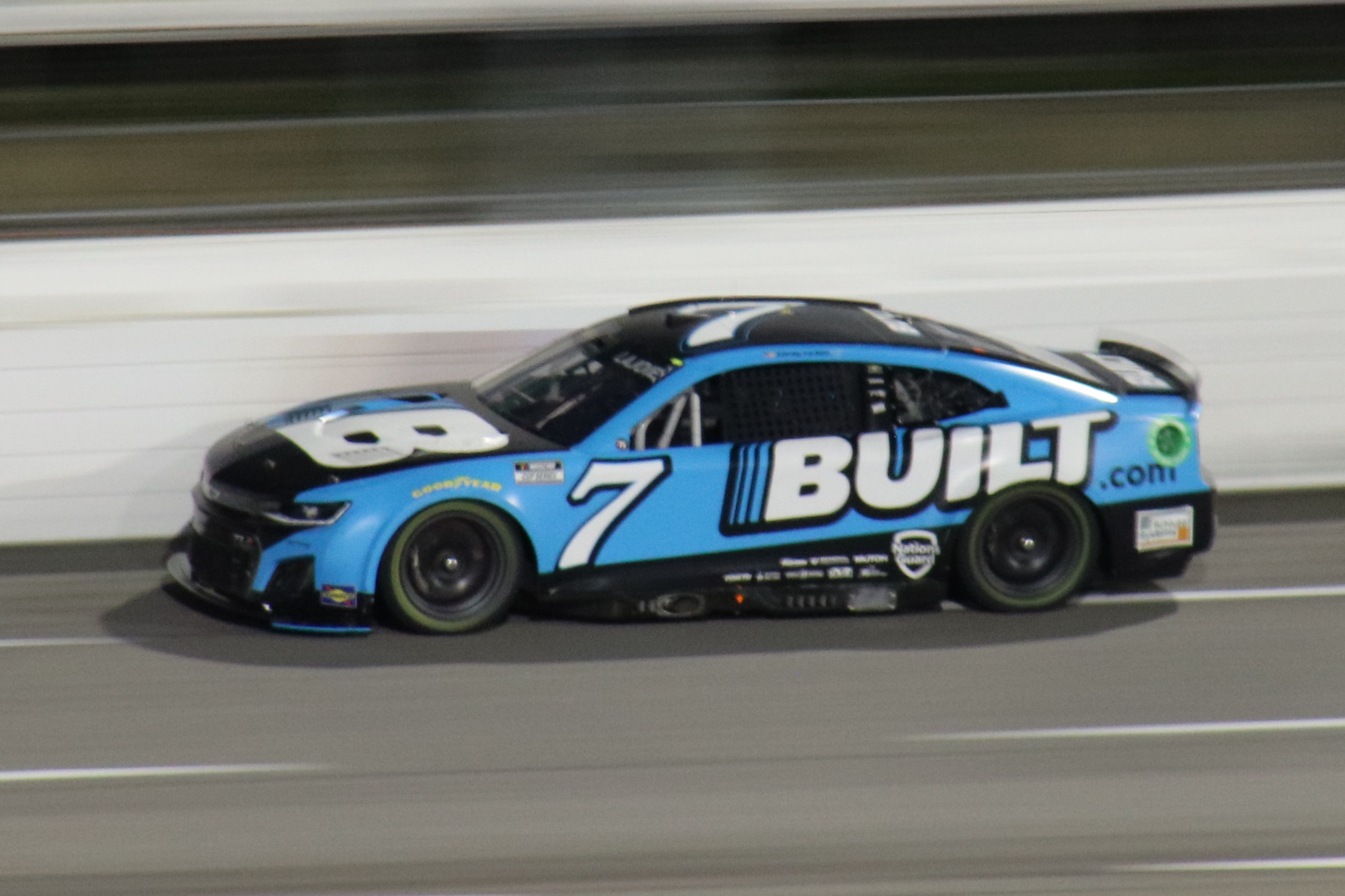
Corey LaJoie in the No. 7 at Martinsville Speedway in 2022

On November 30, 2020, Spire Motorsports announced that Corey LaJoie signed a multi-year agreement with the team starting in 2021. In addition, the team selected the No. 7 with permission from Tommy Baldwin Racing to pay tribute to Alan Kulwicki and Geoff Bodine.

LaJoie drove the No. 7 to a ninth-place finish at the 2021 Daytona 500. Following the season opener, however, the team was unable to break into the top 20 until the race at COTA, where LaJoie finished 20th. Josh Berry drove the No. 7 at Michigan, as LaJoie was sidelined in accordance with team and COVID-19 protocols. LaJoie finished the season 29th in points.

On March 15, 2022, crew chief Ryan Sparks was suspended for four races due to a tire and wheel loss during the 2022 Ruoff Mortgage 500 at Phoenix. At Atlanta, LaJoie led a career-best nineteen laps and was on his way to claiming his first career win with two laps to go when Chase Elliott overtook him and blocked him on the high side, causing him to brush the wall and spin before colliding with Kurt Busch and finishing the race in 21st place.

LaJoie started the 2023 season with a 16th-place finish at the 2023 Daytona 500. He showed huge improvement over the past season with more consistent top-twenty and top-thirty finishes. On May 30, LaJoie was announced as the substitute driver of the Hendrick Motorsports No. 9 at Gateway after Chase Elliott was suspended for one race for intentionally wrecking Denny Hamlin at Charlotte. Carson Hocevar filled in for the No. 7, making his Cup Series debut.

LaJoie started the 2024 season with a fourth place finish at the 2024 Daytona 500.

On July 9, 2024, Spire Motorsports announced that Rodney Childers would replace Sparks as the No. 7's crew chief in 2025 while Sparks would be promoted to competition director. On July 25, LaJoie announced he was parting ways with Spire at the end of the 2024 season.

==== Justin Haley (2024–2025) ====
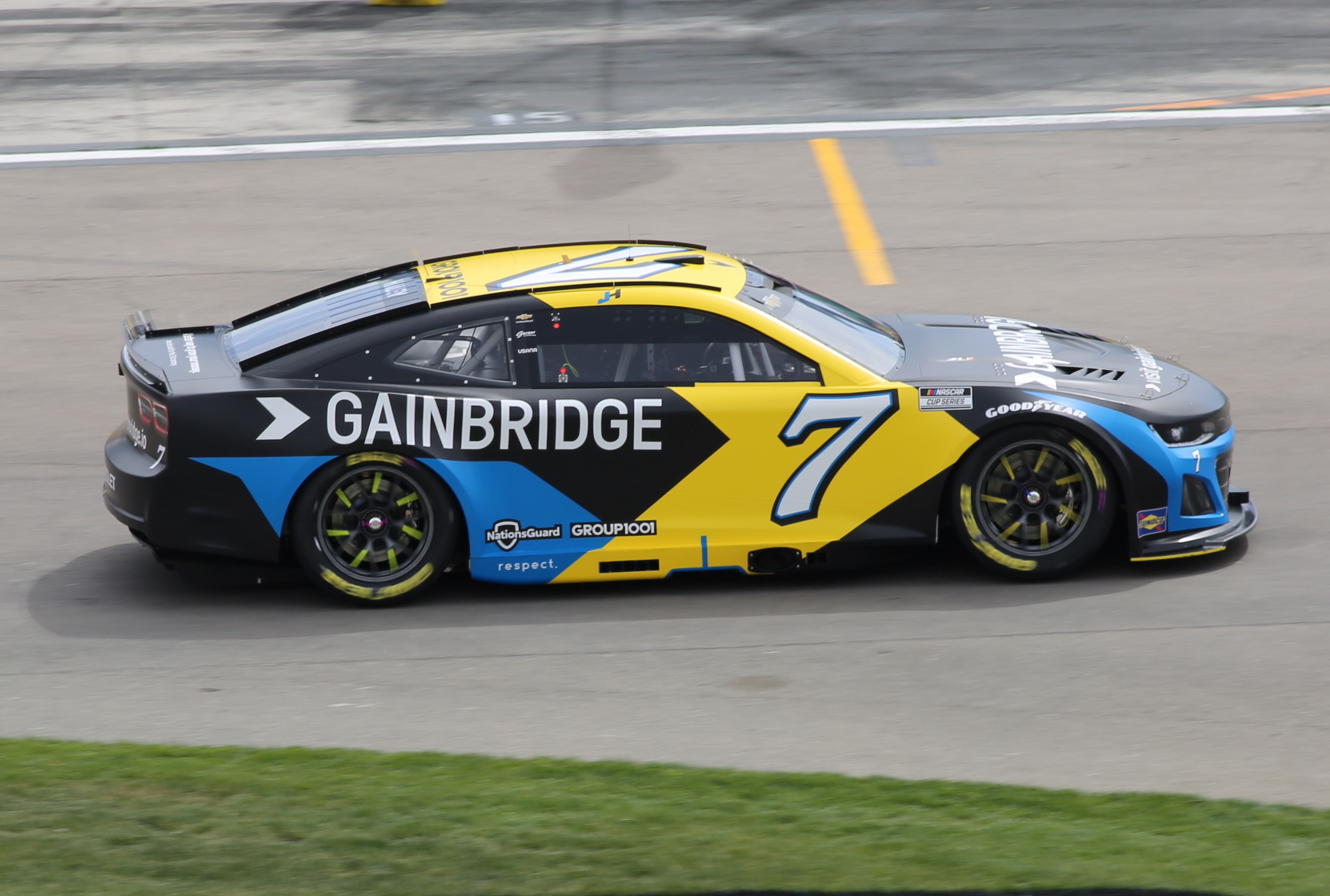
Justin Haley in the No. 7 car at Las Vegas Motor Speedway in 2025

On September 20, 2024, it was announced that LaJoie would move to the Rick Ware Racing No. 51, while Justin Haley would replace him in the No. 7 for the remainder of the 2024 season starting with Kansas, as well as full-time in 2025. On April 23, 2025, Spire Motorsports announced that Childers would be parting ways, effective immediately. The following day, Sparks returned to his former role as crew chief in the No. 7 car while also continuing to be the competition director.

On October 14, 2025, Spire announced that the team and Haley would part ways after the 2025 season.

==== Daniel Suárez (2026) ====
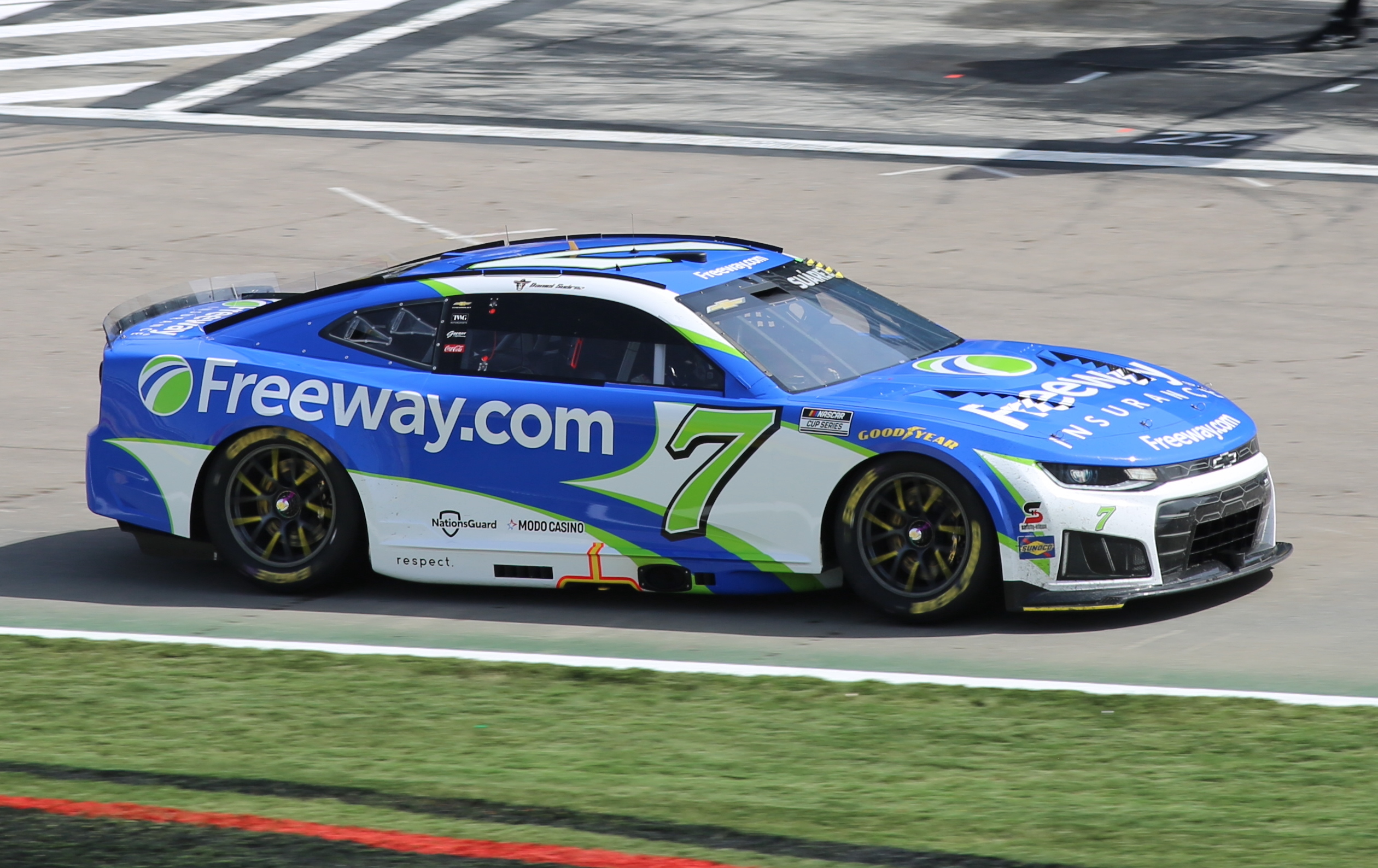
Daniel Suárez in the No. 7 car at Las Vegas Motor Speedway in 2026

On October 22, 2025, it was announced that Daniel Suárez will replace Haley in the No. 7 car in 2026. He started the season with a 13th place finish at the Daytona 500. Suárez scored his first win with Spire Motorsports at a rain-shortened Coca-Cola 600.

==== Car No. 7 results ====
Year	Driver	No.	Make	1	2	3	4	5	6	7	8	9	10	11	12	13	14	15	16	17	18	19	20	21	22	23	24	25	26	27	28	29	30	31	32	33	34	35	36	Owners	Pts
2021	Corey LaJoie	7	Chevy	DAY; 9	DRC; 31	HOM; 36	LVS; 37	PHO; 27	ATL; 29	BRI; 38	MAR; 37	RCH; 21	TAL; 22	KAN; 27	DAR; 22	DOV; 26	COA; 20	CLT; 19	SON; 18	NSH; 15	POC; 36	POC; 23	ROA; 21	ATL; 22	NHA; 23	GLN; 24	IRC; 16		DAY; 16	DAR; 15	RCH; 29	BRI; 26	LVS; 30	TAL; 22	ROV; 35	TEX; 20	KAN; 25	MAR; 21	PHO; 32	29th	459
2021	Josh Berry	7	Chevy																									MCH; 26												29th	459
2022	Corey LaJoie	7	Chevy	DAY; 14	CAL; 28	LVS; 15	PHO; 36	ATL; 5	COA; 36	RCH; 31	MAR; 32	BRD; 19	TAL; 14	DOV; 18	DAR; 35	KAN; 19	CLT; 35	GTW; 36	SON; 34	NSH; 20	ROA; 34	ATL; 21	NHA; 32	POC; 19	IRC; 18	MCH; 19	RCH; 28	GLN; 27	DAY; 30	DAR; 24	KAN; 33	BRI; 15	TEX; 14	TAL; 35	ROV; 12	LVS; 24	HOM; 23	MAR; 21	PHO; 18	32nd	466
2023	Corey LaJoie	7	Chevy	DAY; 16	CAL; 14	LVS; 20	PHO; 26	ATL; 4	COA; 11	RCH; 21	BRD; 30	MAR; 26	TAL; 25	DOV; 14	KAN; 20	DAR; 24	CLT; 17		SON; 20	NSH; 20	CSC; 14	ATL; 31	NHA; 33	POC; 27	RCH; 32	MCH; 15	IRC; 29	GLN; 20	DAY; 10	DAR; 22	KAN; 22	BRI; 25	TEX; 26	TAL; 4	ROV; 17	LVS; 19	HOM; 20	MAR; 22	PHO; 31	26th	588
2023	Carson Hocevar	7	Chevy															GTW; 36																						26th	588
2024	Corey LaJoie	7	Chevy	DAY; 4	ATL; 13	LVS; 32	PHO; 33	BRI; 21	COA; 24	RCH; 36	MAR; 32	TEX; 22	TAL; 18	DOV; 21	KAN; 26	DAR; 16	CLT; 35	GTW; 32	SON; 11	IOW; 21	NHA; 23	NSH; 20	CSC; 27	POC; 19	IND; 14	RCH; 34	MCH; 32	DAY; 34	DAR; 9	ATL; 15	GLN; 8	BRI; 36								32nd	504
2024	Justin Haley	7	Chevy																														KAN; 33	TAL; 7	ROV; 26	LVS; 17	HOM; 34	MAR; 29	PHO; 28	32nd	504
2025	Justin Haley	7	Chevy	DAY; 19	ATL; 24	COA; 16	PHO; 34	LVS; 14	HOM; 10	MAR; 28	DAR; 24	BRI; 13	TAL; 25	TEX; 15	KAN; 31	CLT; 30	NSH; 32	MCH; 21	MXC; 24	POC; 19	ATL; 23	CSC; 22	SON; 15	DOV; 17	IND; 11	IOW; 23	GLN; 27	RCH; 37	DAY; 3	DAR; 27	GTW; 28	BRI; 13	NHA; 33	KAN; 18	ROV; 17	LVS; 27	TAL; 39	MAR; 19	PHO; 14	31st	559
2026	Daniel Suárez	7	Chevy	DAY; 13	ATL; 5	COA; 25	PHO; 30	LVS; 18	DAR; 7	MAR; 20	BRI; 12	KAN; 19	TAL; 12	TEX; 6	GLN; 13	CLT; 1	NSH; 19	MCH; 6	POC; 13	COR; 13	SON; 31	CHI; 14	ATL; 21	NWS; 9	IND; 17	IOW; 23	RCH; 16	NHA; 17	DAY; 2	DAR; 21	GTW; 29	BRI; 14	KAN; 14	LVS; 14	CLT; 13	PHO; 7	TAL; 18	MAR; 28	HOM; 8	14th	2243

=== Car No. 71 history ===
==== Zane Smith (2024) ====
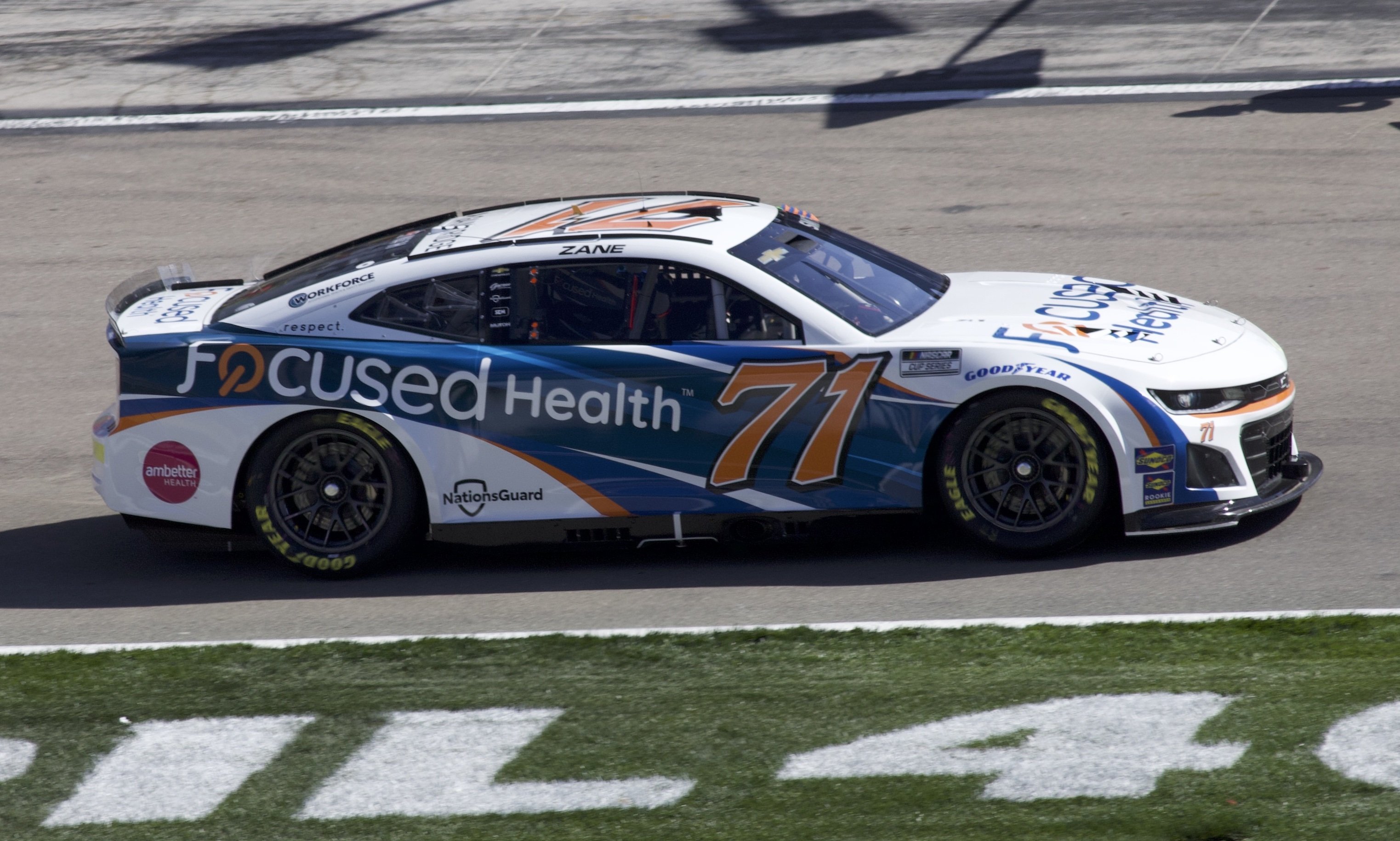
Zane Smith driving the No. 71 at Las Vegas in 2024.

During the same announcement on September 16, 2023, when Spire purchased Live Fast Motorsports' charter, Zane Smith was announced as the driver of Spire's third team in 2024 as a partnership with Trackhouse Racing. Smith signed a multi-year deal with Trackhouse and was supposed to drive the Spire car until he moved to Trackhouse, in a third car, however, in 2024, Trackhouse terminated the agreement, leaving Smith without a ride for 2025.

==== Michael McDowell (2025–present) ====
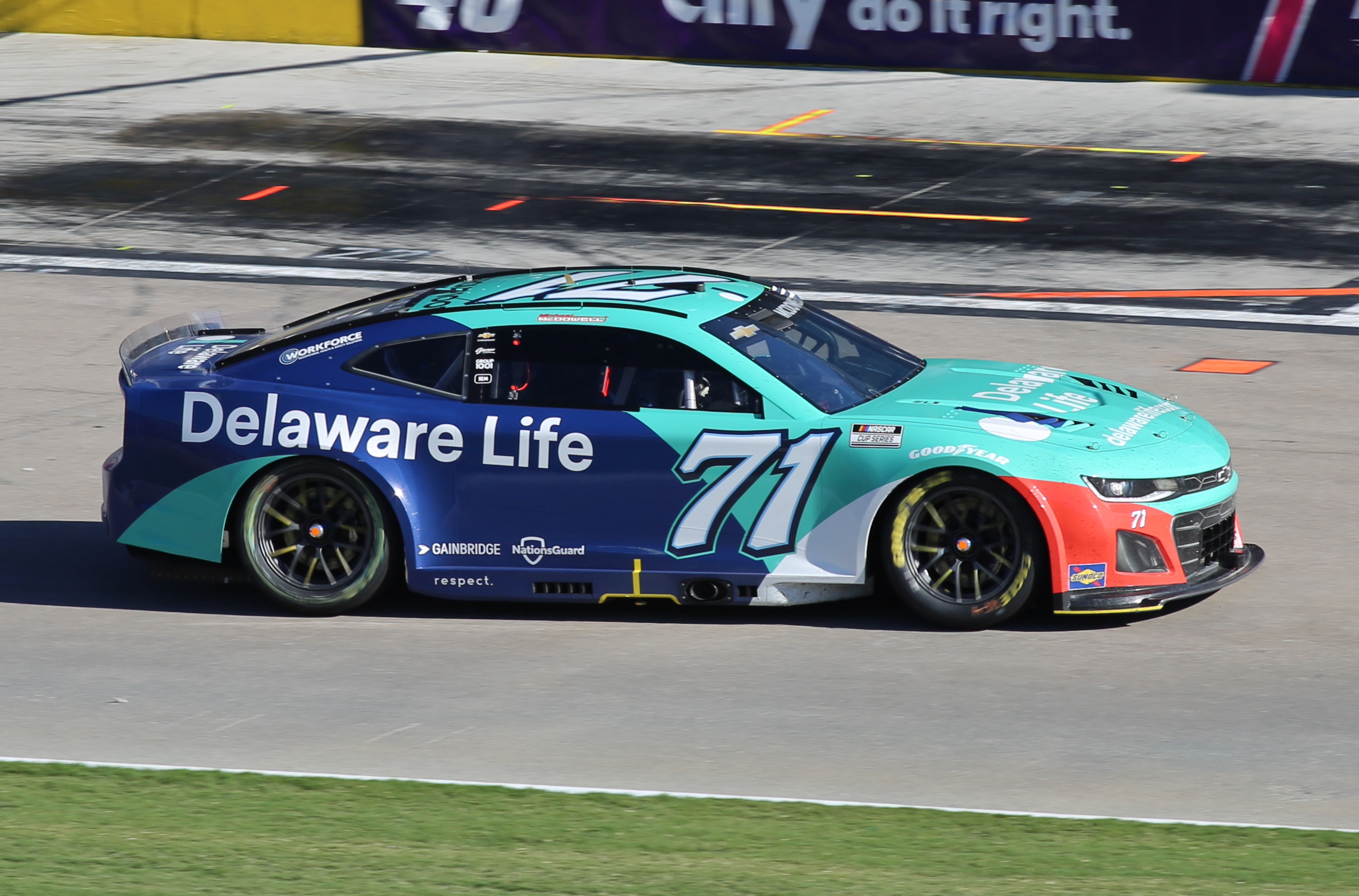
Michael McDowell in the No. 71 car at Las Vegas Motor Speedway in 2025

On May 8, 2024, Michael McDowell signed a multi-year deal to drive the No. 71 starting in 2025. On March 15, 2025, McDowell scored Spire's first ever Cup Series pole position for the Pennzoil 400 at Las Vegas Motor Speedway.

McDowell continued for the 2026 season.

==== Car No. 71 results ====
Year	Driver	No.	Make	1	2	3	4	5	6	7	8	9	10	11	12	13	14	15	16	17	18	19	20	21	22	23	24	25	26	27	28	29	30	31	32	33	34	35	36	Owners	Pts
2024	Zane Smith	71	Chevy	DAY; 13	ATL; 35	LVS; 36	PHO; 29	BRI; 36	COA; 19	RCH; 35	MAR; 31	TEX; 26	TAL; 29	DOV; 24	KAN; 29	DAR; 35	CLT; 33	GTW; 19	SON; 16	IOW; 31	NHA; 30	NSH; 2	CSC; 17	POC; 29	IND; 17	RCH; 23	MCH; 7	DAY; 13	DAR; 23	ATL; 21	GLN; 5	BRI; 16	KAN; 10	TAL; 21	ROV; 19	LVS; 16	HOM; 30	MAR; 21	PHO; 39	31st	505
2025	Michael McDowell	71	Chevy	DAY; 11	ATL; 13	COA; 11	PHO; 27	LVS; 16	HOM; 20	MAR; 12	DAR; 29	BRI; 30	TAL; 11	TEX; 26	KAN; 23	CLT; 7	NSH; 21	MCH; 30	MXC; 5	POC; 35	ATL; 18	CSC; 32*	SON; 4	DOV; 13	IND; 30	IOW; 27	GLN; 19	RCH; 17	DAY; 12	DAR; 33	GTW; 14	BRI; 17	NHA; 8	KAN; 14	ROV; 5	LVS; 16	TAL; 17	MAR; 24	PHO; 8	22nd	734
2026	Michael McDowell	71	Chevy	DAY; 22	ATL; 20	COA; 5	PHO; 9	LVS; 26	DAR; 20	MAR; 18	BRI; 24	KAN; 34	TAL; 32	TEX; 27	GLN; 2	CLT; 14	NSH; 15	MCH; 26	POC; 17	COR; 10	SON; 9	CHI; 29	ATL; 15	NWS; 24	IND; 18	IOW; 25	RCH; 28	NHA; 16	DAY; 4	DAR; 17	GTW; 20	BRI; 21	KAN; 27	LVS; 21	CLT; 19	PHO; 36	TAL; 10	MAR; 16	HOM; 10	20th	691

=== Car No. 77 history ===
==== Multiple drivers (2019–2022) ====
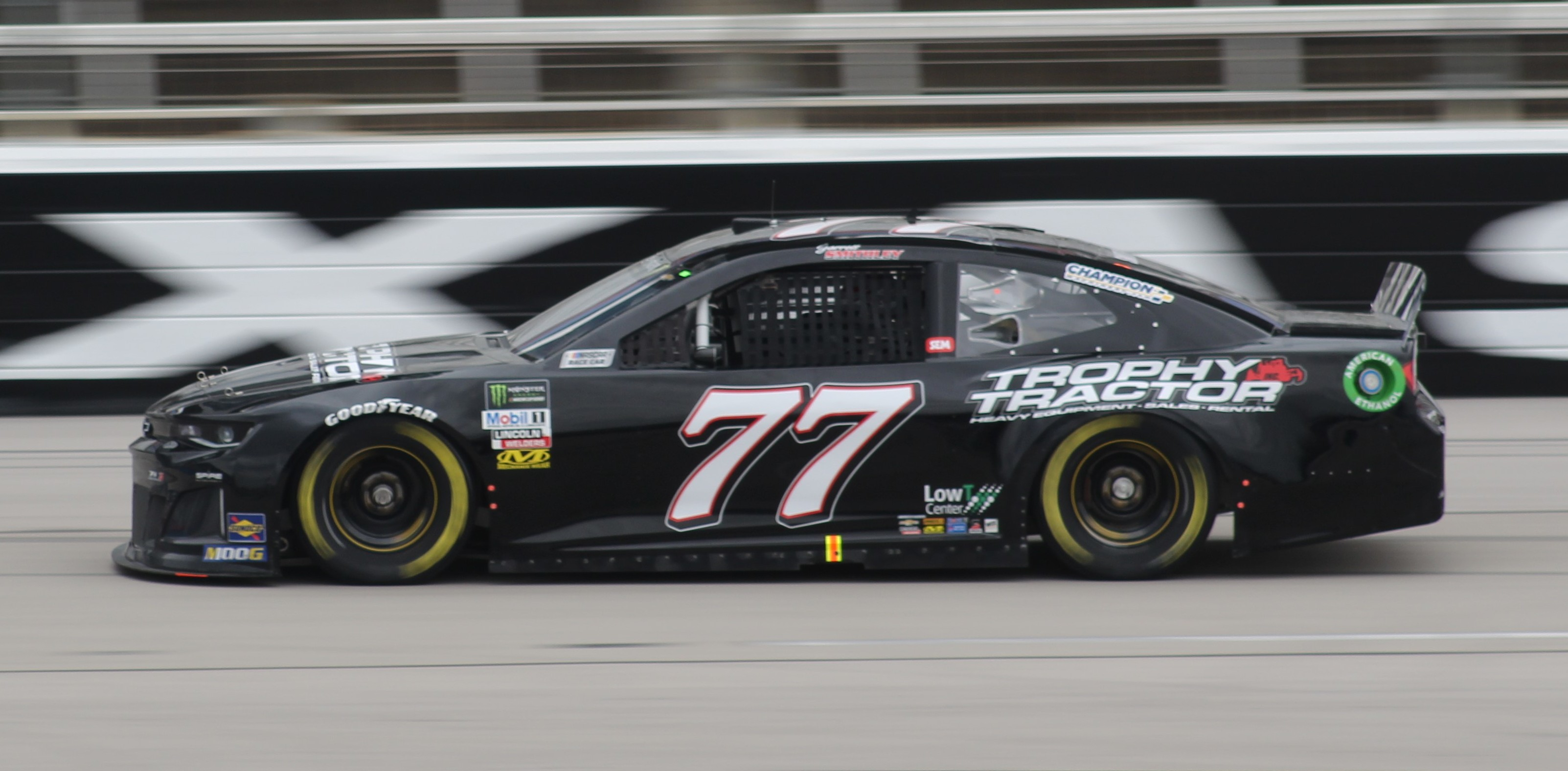
Garrett Smithley driving the 77 at Texas Motor Speedway in 2019

Spire formed a partnership with Chip Ganassi Racing to field the No. 40 for Jamie McMurray at the 2019 Daytona 500, using the newly-acquired No. 77 charter to effectively renumber it to the No. 40 for a one-off and guarantee it qualified for the race. McMurray ended up with a 22nd place finish at the race after being caught in "The Big One".

In January 2019, Quin Houff signed with Spire for a part-time schedule in the No. 77 in 2019 starting at Phoenix Raceway. Prior to Houff's debut, Garrett Smithley and Reed Sorenson drove the car at Atlanta Motor Speedway and Las Vegas Motor Speedway, respectively. Prior to the Atlanta race, car chief Shane Callis was ejected from the track after the No. 77 failed pre-qualifying inspection multiple times. D. J. Kennington joined the team for the Martinsville Speedway race. In April, NASCAR Xfinity Series regular Justin Haley made his Cup debut with the team at Talladega Superspeedway.

On July 7, the team won their first Cup race in their 18th start at the rain-shortened 2019 Coke Zero Sugar 400 at Daytona, with Haley behind the wheel. Haley and the team were not eligible for the Cup Series Playoffs but did receive the Daytona winner's check.

On September 29, Blake Jones was announced to drive the No. 77 at the October Talladega race. Timmy Hill drove for the team at the Kansas and Martinsville playoff races.

On November 27, the team was docked fifty owner points and listed owner T. J. Puchyr fined $50,000 after being caught in a race manipulation scheme at the Homestead-Miami race: Sorenson was heard ignoring multiple calls to pit late in the race before finally obliging. The team then retired the car with an official reason stated being mechanical issues. Along with Rick Ware Racing also exiting the race, this enabled the No. 27 of Premium Motorsports to secure the highest Open (non-chartered) team in the final point standings.

Spire and Chip Ganassi Racing rekindled their partnership in 2020, fielding the No. 77 for Ross Chastain at the Daytona 500 and Coca-Cola 600.

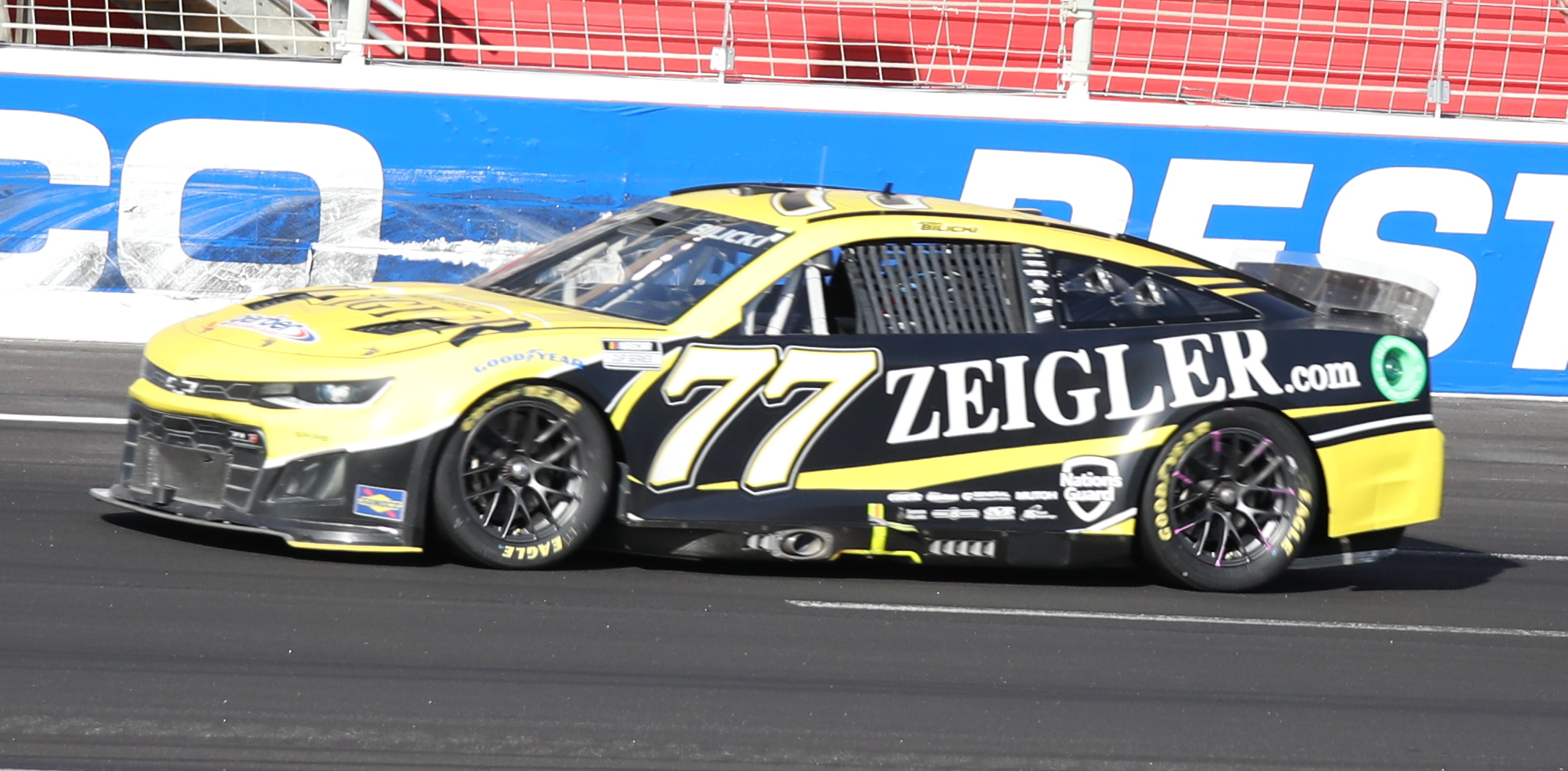
Josh Bilicki driving the 77 at Atlanta Motor Speedway in 2022

For the Michigan double-header the No. 77 team was temperally renumbered to the No. 74 with sponsorship from "Fake Steak" as a tie-in promotion with the Netflix sitcom The Crew.

Jamie McMurray was hired to drive in the 2021 Daytona 500, his first NASCAR sanctioned start since the 2019 Daytona 500. He was caught up in a wreck on lap 14 but managed to recover to finish in an incredible eighth place. Haley drove the car for the majority of the season, with his highest finishes being eighth at Indianapolis and sixth at the Daytona night race.

In 2022, Landon Cassill drove the No. 77 for the majority of the year, while Josh Bilicki drove in the races Cassill was not entered in. Justin Allgaier was announced as the entry for the Bristol dirt race.

==== Ty Dillon (2023) ====
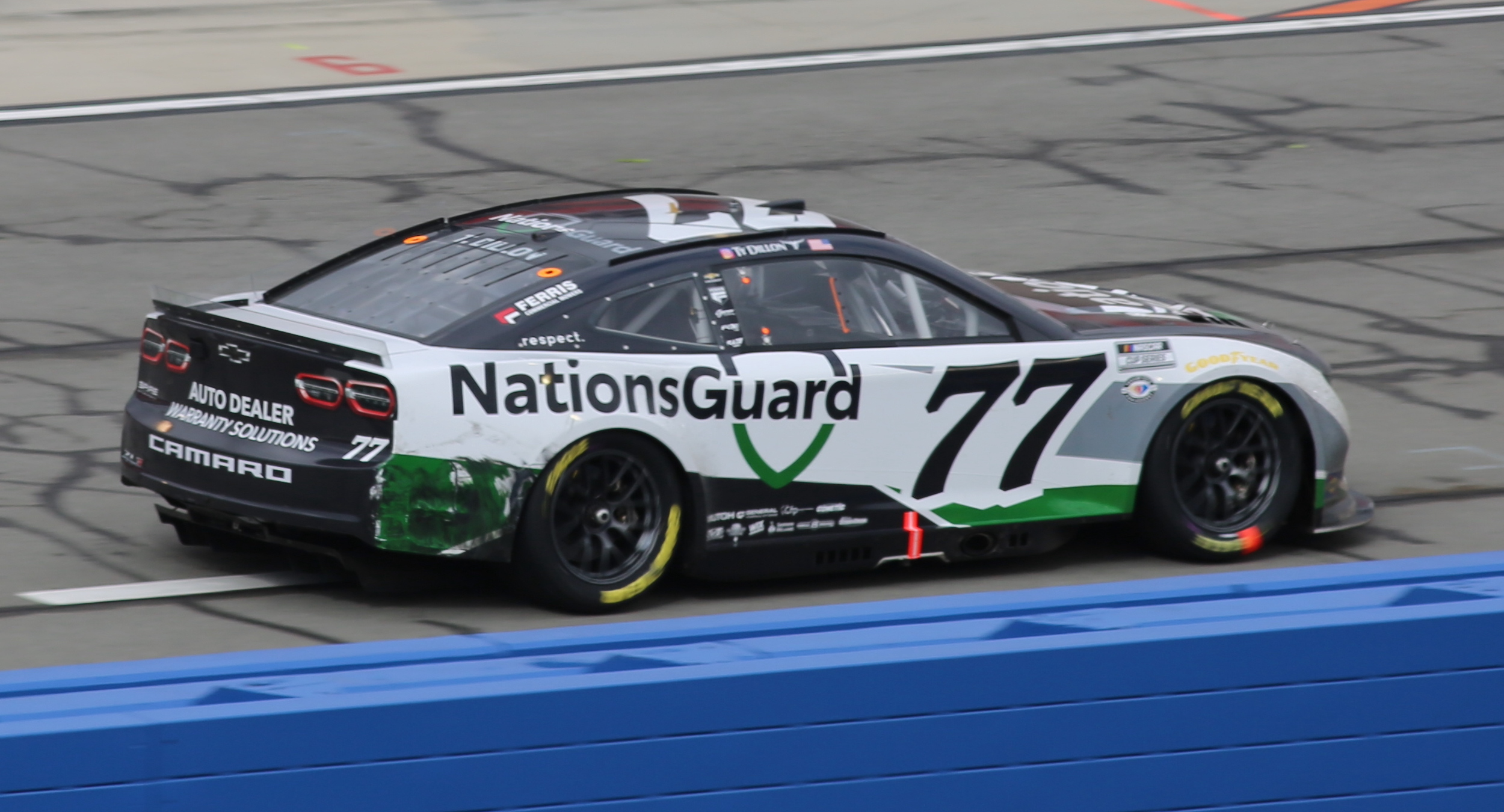
Ty Dillon driving the 77 at Auto Club Speedway in 2023

On October 17, 2022, Spire Motorsports announced that Ty Dillon would drive the No. 77 full-time in 2023. On July 25, 2023, following a string of disappointing finishes, crew chief Kevin Bellicourt was replaced by Kevin Manion starting at the Richmond summer race.

==== Carson Hocevar (2024–present) ====
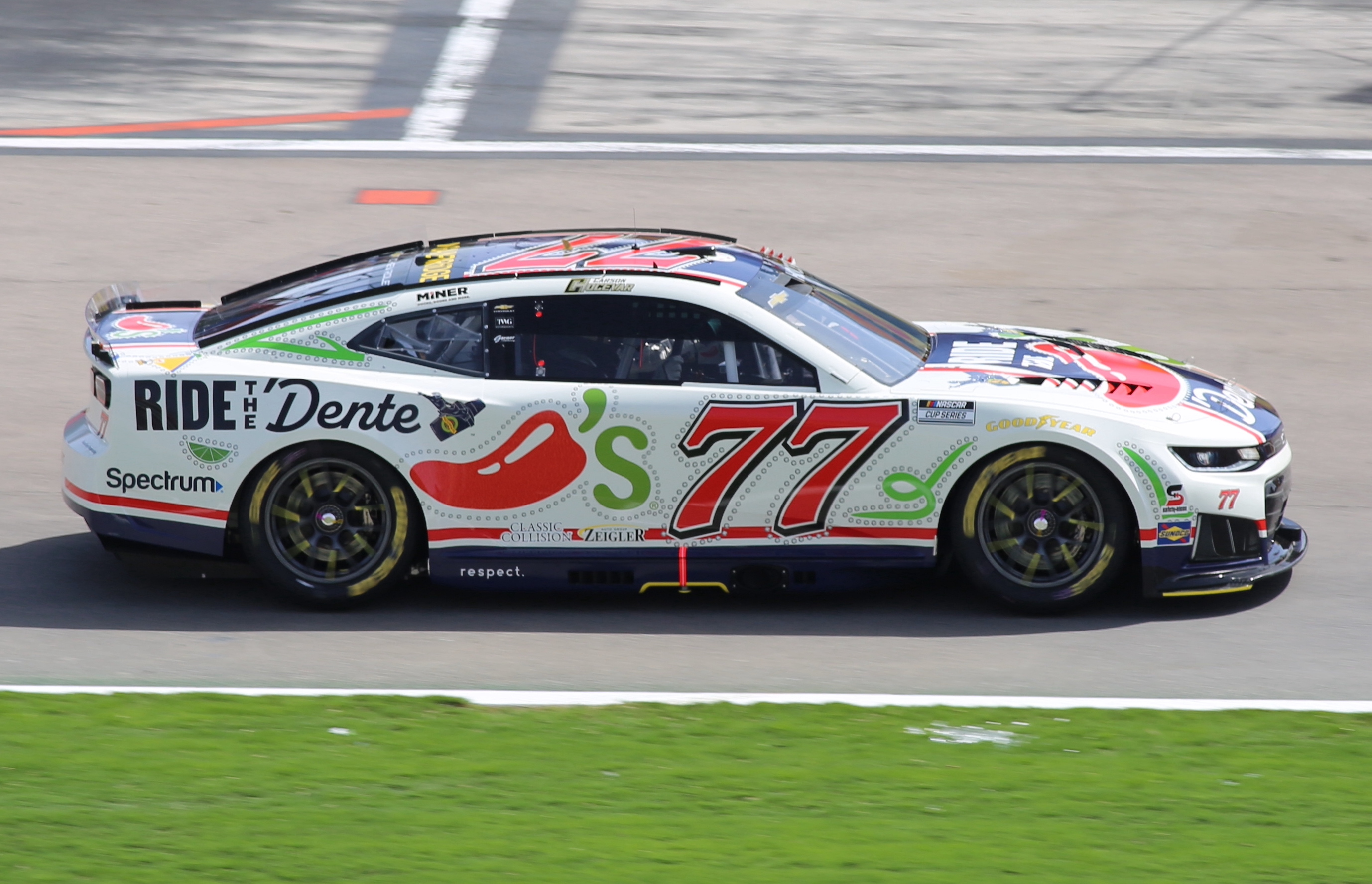
Carson Hocevar driving the 77 at Las Vegas Motor Speedway in 2026.

On October 10, 2023, Carson Hocevar was announced as the driver of the No. 77 for the 2024 season, effectively replacing Dillon. Hocevar started the season with a 40th place DNF at the 2024 Daytona 500. He scored his first career top-ten finish at Texas. At Nashville, Hocevar spun out Harrison Burton during a caution lap; as a result, he was fined US$50,000 and docked 25 driver points. On August 31, Hocevar scored what was, at the time, the team's best ever starting spot at Darlington, qualifying on the front row in second place. At the end of the season, he won the NASCAR Rookie of the Year honors.

Hocevar started the 2025 season with a 30th place DNF at the 2025 Daytona 500. During the regular season, he scored two career-best second-place finishes at Atlanta and Nashville. Following the Mexico road race, Spire Motorsports fined Hocevar US$50,000 and ordered him to undergo cultural-sensitivity and bias-awareness training for making scathing comments on Mexico City during a livestream. Hocevar was once again fined US$50,000 following a crash at the Kansas playoff race when he revved his car and spun his tires in an attempt to rejoin the field while safety personnel attended to him.

Hocevar started the 2026 season with an 18th place finish at the 2026 Daytona 500. On April 26, he scored his first career win at Talladega. Following an incident with Austin Cindric in the 2026 Xfinity 500, Hocevar was suspended by the team for the following race at Homestead. He was replaced by Justin Haley.

==== Car No. 77 results ====
Year	Driver	No.	Make	1	2	3	4	5	6	7	8	9	10	11	12	13	14	15	16	17	18	19	20	21	22	23	24	25	26	27	28	29	30	31	32	33	34	35	36	Owners	Pts
2019	Jamie McMurray	40	Chevy	DAY; 22																																				36th	132
2019	Garrett Smithley	77	Chevy		ATL; 36			CAL; 36		TEX; 32																MCH; 35														36th	132
2019	Reed Sorenson	77	Chevy			LVS; 36																			GLN; 37		BRI; 38	DAR; 30	IND; 23	LVS; 37	RCH; 37	ROV; 39	DOV; 37					PHO; 37	HOM; 37	36th	132
2019	Quin Houff	77	Chevy				PHO; 30				BRI; 32	RCH; 34		DOV; 36	KAN; 34	CLT; 28	POC; 29	MCH; 32		CHI; 38		KEN; 34	NHA; 31	POC; 31													TEX; 33			36th	132
2019	D. J. Kennington	77	Chevy						MAR; 32																															36th	132
2019	Justin Haley	77	Chevy										TAL; 32						SON; 34		DAY; 1																			36th	132
2019	Blake Jones	77	Chevy																															TAL; 31						36th	132
2019	Timmy Hill	77	Chevy																																KAN; 39	MAR; 34				36th	132
2020	Ross Chastain	77	Chevy	DAY; 25						CLT; 21									IND; 17										DAY; 16	DAR; 29										34th	244
2020	Reed Sorenson	77	Chevy		LVS; 34	CAL; 36	PHO; 30	DAR; 29																MCH; 30†	MCH; 31†		DOV; 39	DOV; 33			RCH; 36	BRI; 36				KAN; 36	TEX; 32			34th	244
2020	J. J. Yeley	77	Chevy						DAR; 28		CLT; 34		ATL; 36								TEX; 24												LVS; 33		ROV; 35					34th	244
2020	Garrett Smithley	77	Chevy									BRI; 26		MAR; 36								KAN; 26	NHA; 31															MAR; 39		34th	244
2020	B. J. McLeod	77	Chevy												HOM; 35	TAL; 31																								34th	244
2020	James Davison	77	Chevy														POC; 34	POC; 30																						34th	244
2020	Josh Bilicki	77	Chevy																	KEN; 32																			PHO; 35	34th	244
2020	Stanton Barrett	77	Chevy																							DRC; 38														34th	244
2020	Justin Haley	77	Chevy																															TAL; 11						34th	244
2021	Jamie McMurray	77	Chevy	DAY; 8																																				31st	338
2021	Justin Haley	77	Chevy		DRC; 24	HOM; 26	LVS; 29	PHO; 24	ATL; 30		MAR; 35	RCH; 38	TAL; 30	KAN; 30	DAR; 28		COA; 40	CLT; 28		NSH; 35	POC; 27		ROA; 25	ATL; 29	NHA; 28	GLN; 29	IRC; 8	MCH; 25	DAY; 6	DAR; 25	RCH; 27	BRI; 36	LVS; 32		ROV; 37	TEX; 37	KAN; 39	MAR; 31	PHO; 26	31st	338
2021	Stewart Friesen	77	Chevy							BRI; 23																														31st	338
2021	Josh Berry	77	Chevy													DOV; 30																								31st	338
2021	Ben Rhodes	77	Chevy																SON; 30																					31st	338
2021	Justin Allgaier	77	Chevy																			POC; 25												TAL; 40						31st	338
2022	Landon Cassill	77	Chevy	DAY; 15			PHO; 30			RCH; 32			TAL; 19		DAR; 22							ATL; 24					RCH; 30		DAY; 4	DAR; 25	KAN; 24	BRI; 22	TEX; 22	TAL; 11		LVS; 32	HOM; 29	MAR; 32	PHO; 36	33rd	371
2022	Josh Bilicki	77	Chevy		CAL; 30	LVS; 29		ATL; 16	COA; 22		MAR; 35			DOV; 32		KAN; 28	CLT; 36	GTW; 28	SON; 29	NSH; 33	ROA; 36		NHA; 34	POC; 34	IRC; 22	MCH; 21														33rd	371
2022	Justin Allgaier	77	Chevy									BRI; 36																												33rd	371
2022	Mike Rockenfeller	77	Chevy																									GLN; 30							ROV; 29					33rd	371
2023	Ty Dillon	77	Chevy	DAY; 40	CAL; 31	LVS; 34	PHO; 30	ATL; 23	COA; 39	RCH; 32	BRD; 21	MAR; 32	TAL; 14	DOV; 36	KAN; 22	DAR; 27	CLT; 27	GTW; 25	SON; 23	NSH; 32	CSC; 35	ATL; 19	NHA; 26	POC; 28	RCH; 34	MCH; 20	IRC; 27	GLN; 34	DAY; 11	DAR; 29	KAN; 28	BRI; 33	TEX; 19	TAL; 27	ROV; 31	LVS; 24	HOM; 24	MAR; 24	PHO; 28	33rd	364
2024	Carson Hocevar	77	Chevy	DAY; 40	ATL; 19	LVS; 15	PHO; 15	BRI; 27	COA; 22	RCH; 27	MAR; 17	TEX; 10	TAL; 17	DOV; 22	KAN; 24	DAR; 26	CLT; 21	GTW; 8	SON; 17	IOW; 14	NHA; 17	NSH; 16	CSC; 24	POC; 17	IND; 12	RCH; 8	MCH; 10	DAY; 11	DAR; 33	ATL; 16	GLN; 3	BRI; 18	KAN; 32	TAL; 14	ROV; 12	LVS; 23	HOM; 9	MAR; 25	PHO; 18	21st	711
2025	Carson Hocevar	77	Chevy	DAY; 30	ATL; 2	COA; 13	PHO; 36	LVS; 30	HOM; 37	MAR; 19	DAR; 32	BRI; 11	TAL; 6	TEX; 24	KAN; 26	CLT; 34	NSH; 2	MCH; 29	MXC; 34	POC; 18	ATL; 10	CSC; 35	SON; 32	DOV; 35	IND; 10	IOW; 8	GLN; 18	RCH; 15	DAY; 34	DAR; 9	GTW; 15	BRI; 7	NHA; 11	KAN; 29	ROV; 27	LVS; 32	TAL; 6	MAR; 31	PHO; 28	23rd	702
2026	Carson Hocevar	77	Chevy	DAY; 18	ATL; 4	COA; 31	PHO; 19	LVS; 22	DAR; 4	MAR; 17	BRI; 10	KAN; 13	TAL; 1	TEX; 7	GLN; 28	CLT; 23	NSH; 10	MCH; 5	POC; 20	COR; 19	SON; 11	CHI; 22	ATL; 3	NWS; 13	IND; 9	IOW; 31	RCH; 37	NHA; 19	DAY; 38	DAR; 11	GTW; 8	BRI; 3	KAN; 33	LVS; 12	CLT; 14	PHO; 12	TAL; 6	MAR; 21		13th	2275
2026	Justin Haley	77	Chevy																																				HOM; 21	13th	2275
^{†} – Ran as #74 for promotional purposes.

== Xfinity Series ==
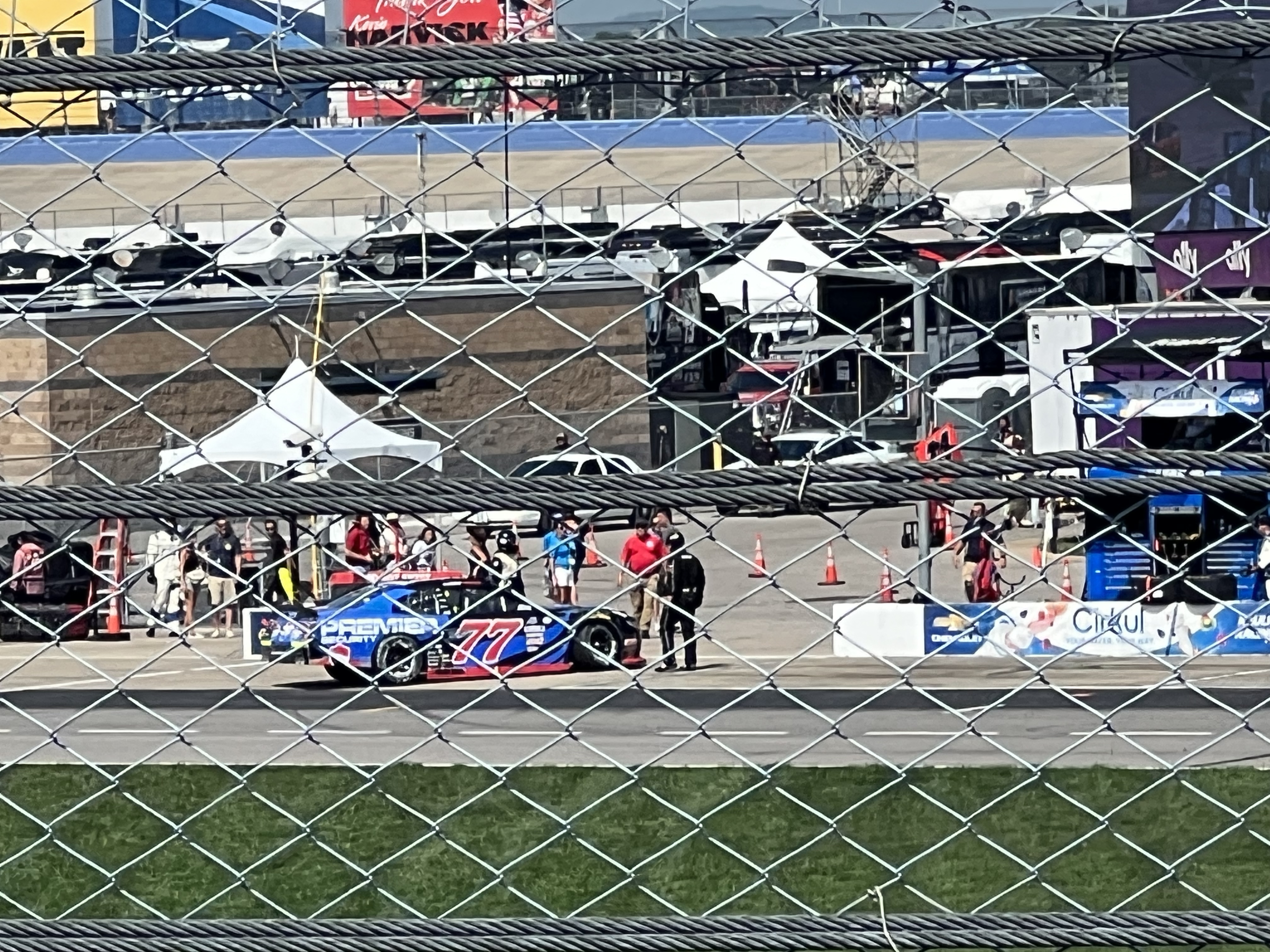
Hocevar's damaged car at Nashville in 2023.

=== Car No. 77 history ===
On March 7, 2023, the team announced that they would expand their racing operations to the NASCAR Xfinity Series, with Carson Hocevar running six races in their No. 77 car. However the team only ran in four races.

==== Car No. 77 results ====
Year	Team	No.	Make	1	2	3	4	5	6	7	8	9	10	11	12	13	14	15	16	17	18	19	20	21	22	23	24	25	26	27	28	29	30	31	32	33	Owners	Pts	Ref
2023	Carson Hocevar	77	Chevy	DAY	CAL	LVS	PHO	ATL	COA	RCH	MAR	TAL	DOV; Wth	DAR; 6	CLT; 8	PIR	SON	NSH; 36	CSC	ATL	NHA	POC	ROA	MCH; 32	IRC	GLN	DAY	DAR	KAN	BRI	TEX	ROV	LVS	HOM	MAR	PHO	42nd	74	

== Craftsman Truck Series ==
=== Truck No. 07 History ===
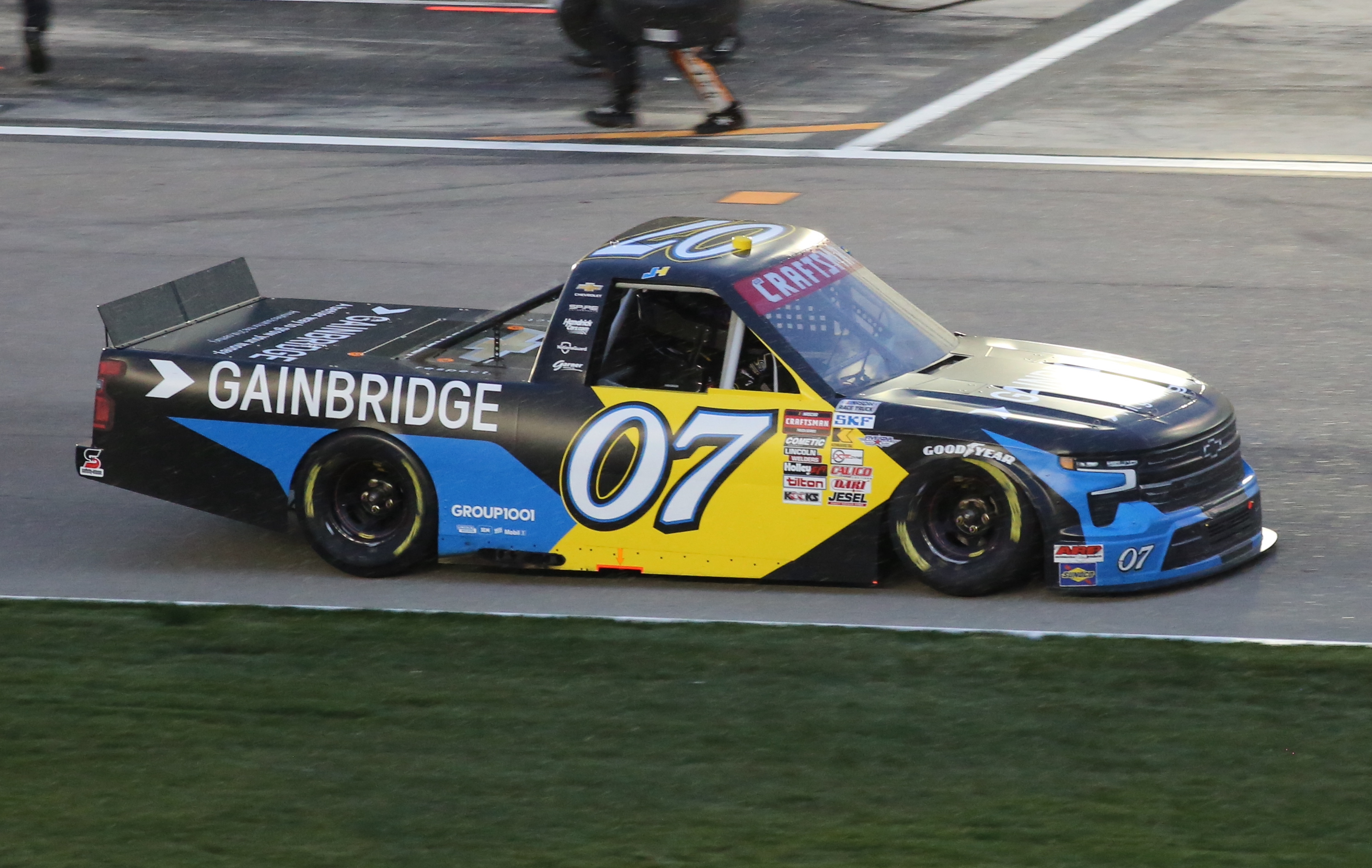
Justin Haley driving the No. 07 at Las Vegas Motor Speedway in 2025

On January 9, 2025, Spire Motorsports announced they would expand to run four trucks, adding the No. 07 as the newest addition. The following day, Spire announced the end of their agreement with Rev Racing. The Rev Racing No. 2 truck will now become the No. 07 truck for Spire. On January 29, 2025, it was announced that Michael McDowell would return to the Truck Series to field the No. 07 truck at Daytona. On February 17, 2025, it was announced that Kyle Busch would compete in three races for the No. 07 team. On March 4, 2025, it was announced that Kyle Larson and William Byron would compete for the No. 07 team. Larson earned the first win for the No. 07 team at Homestead after overcoming a late race spin. Throughout the season, Spire added Justin Haley, Sammy Smith, Nick Sanchez, B. J. McLeod, Corey LaJoie, Patrick Emerling, Thomas Annunziata and Brenden Queen to drive the No. 07. Spire scaled down to a three-truck operation midway through 2025, with the No. 07 making its last start at Watkins Glen.

==== Truck No. 07 results ====
Year	Driver	No.	Make	1	2	3	4	5	6	7	8	9	10	11	12	13	14	15	16	17	18	19	20	21	22	23	24	25	Owners	Pts
2025	Michael McDowell	07	Chevy	DAY; 26	ATL; 12																									
2025	Justin Haley	07	Chevy			LVS; 11																								
2025	Kyle Larson	07	Chevy				HOM; 1		BRI; 2																					
2025	William Byron	07	Chevy					MAR; 14				KAN; 2																		
2025	Sammy Smith	07	Chevy							CAR; 16																				
2025	Nick Sanchez	07	Chevy								TEX; 13																			
2025	Kyle Busch	07	Chevy										NWS; 9		NSH; 15					GLN; 36	RCH	DAR	BRI	NHA	ROV	TAL	MAR	PHO		
2025	B. J. McLeod	07	Chevy											CLT; 15																
2025	Corey LaJoie	07	Chevy													MCH; 5														
2025	Patrick Emerling	07	Chevy														POC; 15													
2025	Thomas Annunziata	07	Chevy															LRP; 15												
2025	Brenden Queen	07	Chevy																IRP; 16											

=== Truck No. 7 History ===
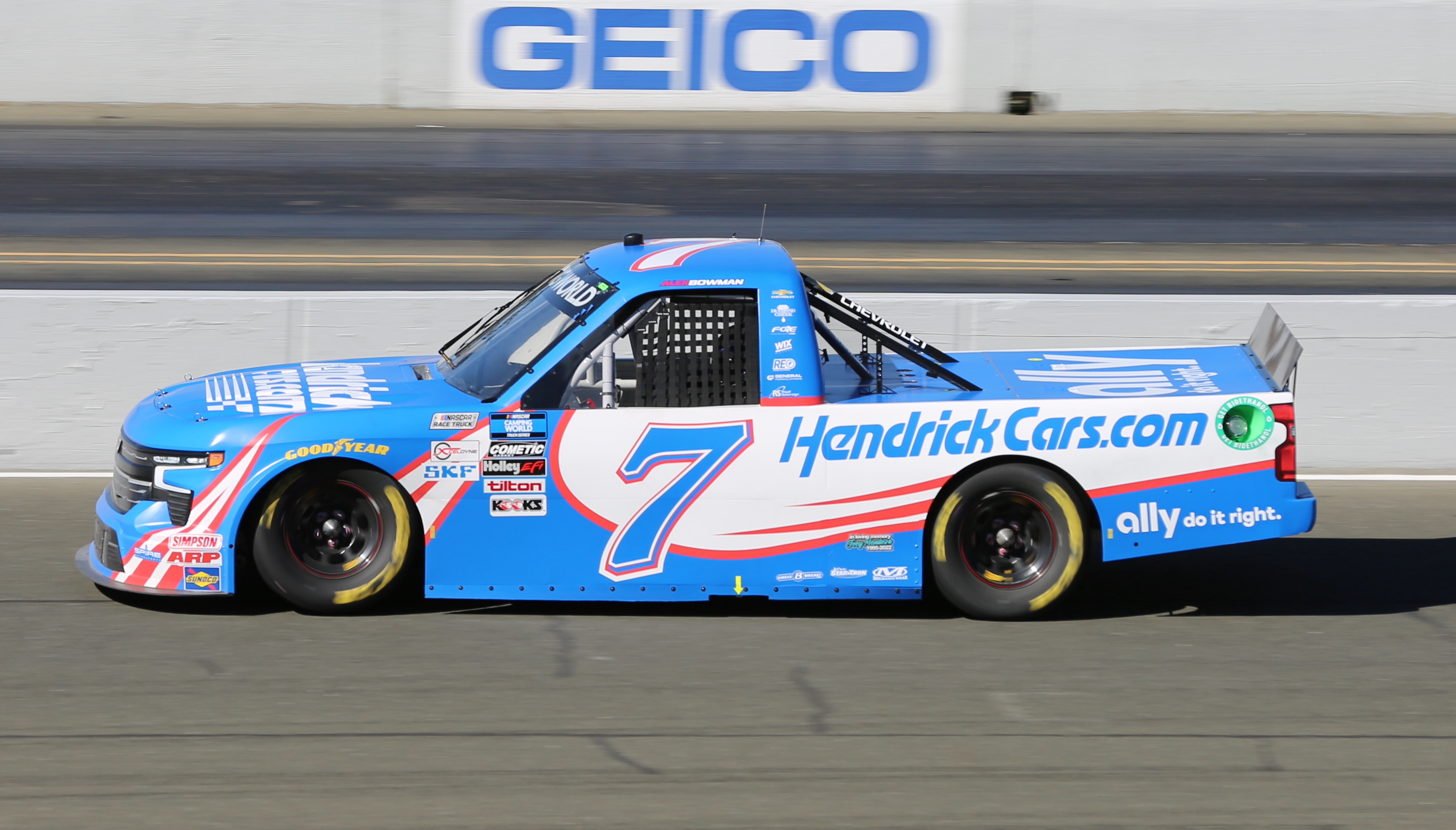
Alex Bowman in the No. 7 at Sonoma Raceway in 2022

On November 23, 2021, Spire announced that they would field a team in the Camping World Truck Series in 2022, with Kevin Manion as crew chief. On February 11, 2022, Spire announced Austin Hill would drive the No. 7 Chevrolet Silverado at Daytona with Kevin Manion as crew chief and sponsorship from United Rentals. On April 7, William Byron gave Spire its first Truck Series win at Martinsville. Chase Elliott drove the No. 7 to a seventh-place finish at Bristol dirt race. On May 31, It was announced that Rajah Caruth would make his truck series debut at the World Wide Technology Raceway in the No. 7.

The No. 7 returned on a part-time basis in 2023, with Corey LaJoie finishing 23rd at Daytona. Professional dirt track racer Jonathan Davenport drove the truck to a 14th-place finish at the Bristol dirt race. Kyle Larson drove the No. 7 to the team's second Truck Series win at North Wilkesboro.

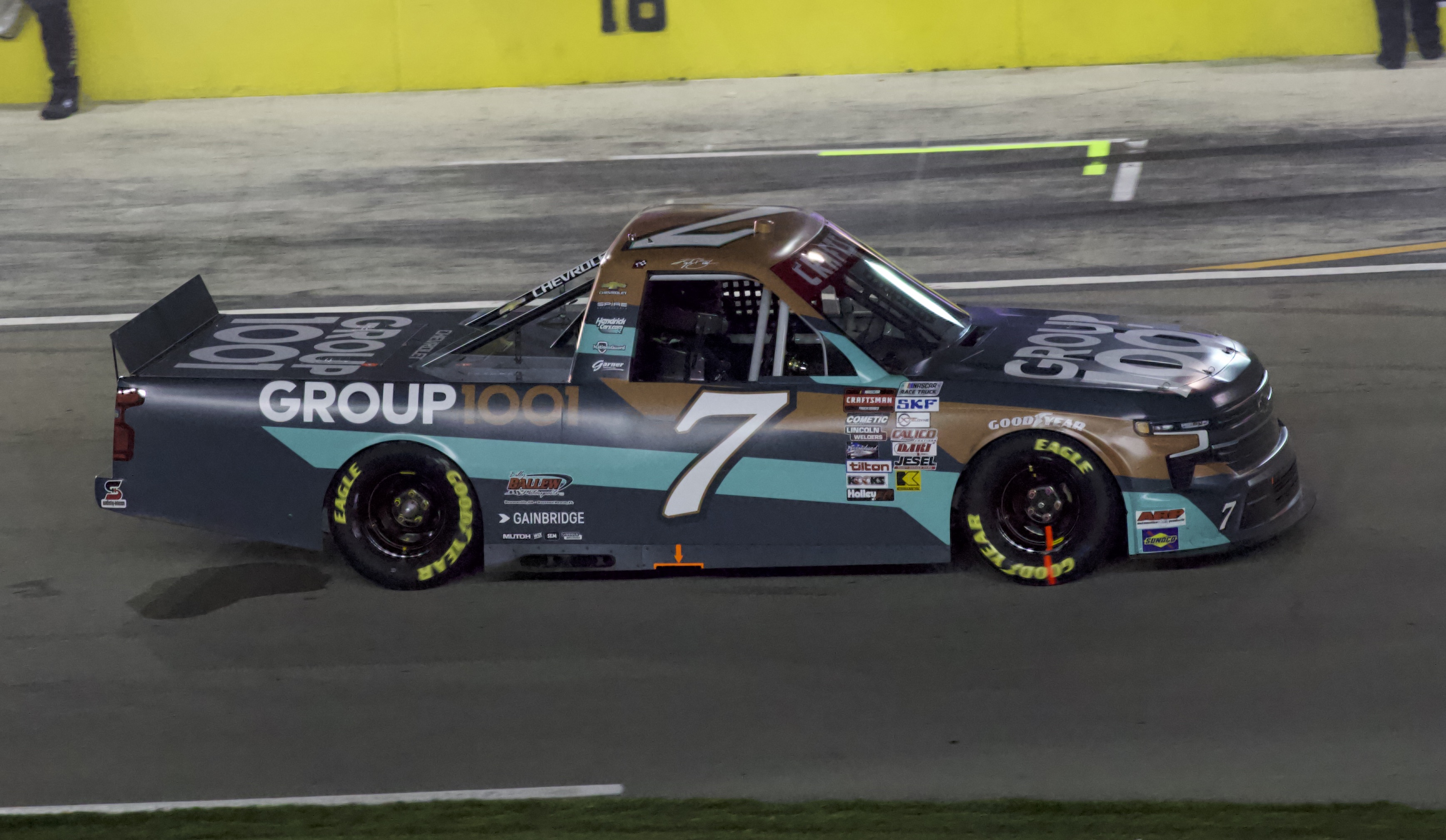
Kyle Busch in the No. 7 at Las Vegas in 2024.

During the 2024 season, LaJoie drove the No. 7 to a twentieth place finish at Daytona. A week later, Kyle Busch won at Atlanta in his first Truck race after selling his team to Spire. Connor Zilisch, Trackhouse Racing development driver, made his debut race in the series with Spire Motorsports at COTA. On March 27, 2024, it was announced that Sammy Smith would drive the No. 7 Truck in a four-race deal. On April 12, Busch won at Texas. On April 23, it was announced that Connor Mosack would drive the No. 7 on a five race deal. On May 21, it was announced that Andrés Pérez de Lara would make his Truck Series debut at Gateway.

On January 29, 2025, it was announced that Justin Haley would return to the Truck Series, driving the No. 7 at Daytona. On February 17, 2025, it was announced that Kyle Busch would compete in two races for the No. 7 team. Busch scored his first win of the season at Atlanta. Carson Hocevar also took the No. 7 to victory lane at Kansas.

For the 2026 season, the No. 7 truck was shared between Michael McDowell, Busch, Mosack, Sammy Smith, Corey Day, Rajah Caruth, Chase Elliott, Shane Van Gisbergen, and Brennan Poole. Busch scored wins at Atlanta and Dover; the latter being his last career win before his death on May 21. Smith won at Talladega

==== Truck No. 7 results ====
Year	Driver	No.	Make	1	2	3	4	5	6	7	8	9	10	11	12	13	14	15	16	17	18	19	20	21	22	23	24	25	Owners	Pts
2022	Austin Hill	7	Chevy	DAY; 15	LVS	ATL													POC; 6	IRP									31st	205
2022	Alex Bowman	7	Chevy				COA; 25								SON; 29	KNX	NSH												31st	205
2022	William Byron	7	Chevy					MAR; 1																					31st	205
2022	Chase Elliott	7	Chevy						BRI; 7	DAR	KAN	TEX	CLT																31st	205
2022	Rajah Caruth	7	Chevy											GTW; 11							RCH; 25	KAN	BRI; 34	TAL	HOM	PHO; 32			31st	205
2022	Dylan Lupton	7	Chevy															MOH; 32											31st	205
2023	Corey LaJoie	7	Chevy	DAY; 23*	LVS	ATL						DAR; 16																	29th	263
2023	Alex Bowman	7	Chevy				COA; DNQ	TEX																					29th	263
2023	Jonathan Davenport	7	Chevy						BRD; 14	MAR	KAN																		29th	263
2023	Kyle Larson	7	Chevy										NWS; 1*	CLT	GTW	NSH													29th	263
2023	Marco Andretti	7	Chevy														MOH; 19								HOM; 18	PHO; 35			29th	263
2023	Austin Hill	7	Chevy															POC; 33	RCH										29th	263
2023	Layne Riggs	7	Chevy																	IRP; 3									29th	263
2023	Derek Kraus	7	Chevy																		MLW; 8	KAN							29th	263
2023	Carson Kvapil	7	Chevy																				BRI; 12	TAL					29th	263
2024	Corey LaJoie	7	Chevy	DAY; 20																									8th	2192
2024	Kyle Busch	7	Chevy		ATL; 1	LVS; 15	BRI; 2			TEX; 1*		DAR; 32																	8th	2192
2024	Connor Zilisch	7	Chevy					COA; 4											RCH; 29		BRI; 19		TAL; 33		MAR; 12				8th	2192
2024	Sammy Smith	7	Chevy						MAR; 8				NWS; 5					IRP; 6		MLW; 17									8th	2192
2024	Connor Mosack	7	Chevy								KAN; 30			CLT; 9			POC; 15					KAN; 10		HOM; 3		PHO; 8			8th	2192
2024	Andrés Pérez de Lara	7	Chevy												GTW; 9														8th	2192
2024	Clint Bowyer	7	Chevy													NSH; 17													8th	2192
2025	Justin Haley	7	Chevy	DAY; 5																									7th	2215
2025	Kyle Busch	7	Chevy		ATL; 1*									CLT; 5															7th	2215
2025	Corey Day	7	Chevy			LVS; 27	HOM; 15	MAR; 32	BRI; 15	CAR; 22					NSH; 5				IRP; 2			DAR; 9	BRI; 11						7th	2215
2025	Carson Hocevar	7	Chevy								TEX; 17	KAN; 1*				MCH; 11*	POC; 13												7th	2215
2025	Sammy Smith	7	Chevy										NWS; 10							GLN; 6	RCH; 4								7th	2215
2025	Jordan Taylor	7	Chevy															LRP; 20											7th	2215
2025	Patrick Emerling	7	Chevy																					NHA; 28					7th	2215
2025	Connor Zilisch	7	Chevy																						ROV; 5				7th	2215
2025	J. J. Yeley	7	Chevy																							TAL; 13			7th	2215
2025	Brenden Queen	7	Chevy																								MAR; 10		7th	2215
2025	Stefan Parsons	7	Chevy																									PHO; 11	7th	2215
2026	Michael McDowell	7	Chevy	DAY; 24*																									9th	2210
2026	Kyle Busch	7	Chevy		ATL; 1				BRI; 8	TEX; 2		DOV; 1*																	9th	2210
2026	Connor Mosack	7	Chevy			STP; 13	DAR; 5				GLN; 10				MCH; 8	COR; 24	LRP; 18		IRP; 2		NHA; 30	BRI; 25		CLT; 33	PHO; 11			HOM; 16	9th	2210
2026	Sammy Smith	7	Chevy					ROC; 11																		TAL; 1*	MAR; 33		9th	2210
2026	Corey Day	7	Chevy										CLT; 35																9th	2210
2026	Rajah Caruth	7	Chevy											NSH; 2															9th	2210
2026	Chase Elliott	7	Chevy															NWS; 7											9th	2210
2026	Shane Van Gisbergen	7	Chevy																	RCH; 4									9th	2210
2026	Brennan Poole	7	Chevy																				KAN; 17						9th	2210

=== Truck No. 71 History ===
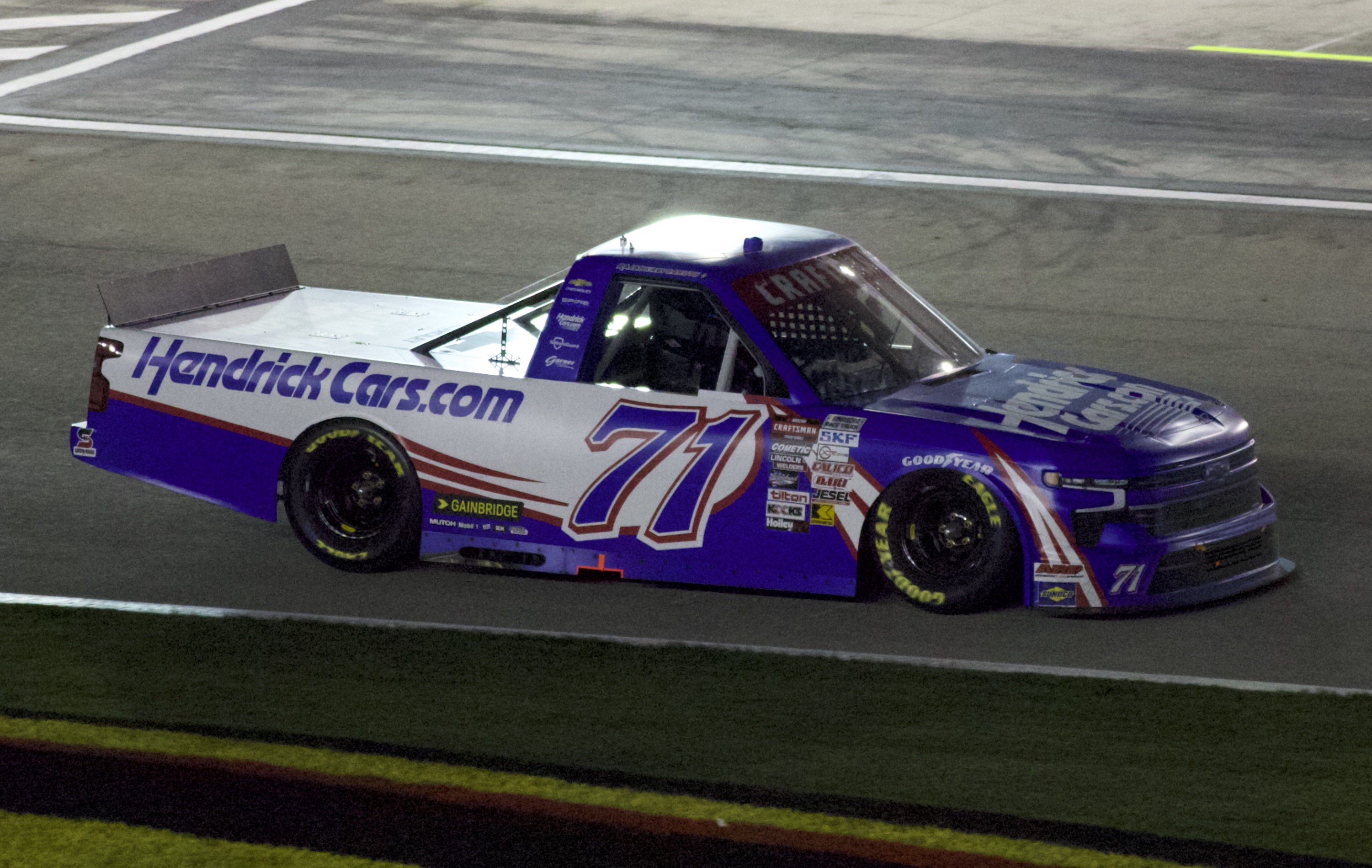
Caruth at Las Vegas in 2024.

On February 7, 2024, It was announced that Rajah Caruth will be driving the No. 71 full-time in 2024. At Las Vegas, Caruth scored his first career win, becoming the second ever African-American driver to win a Truck Series race and only the third ever to win a NASCAR national series race.

On December 13, 2024, it was announced that Caruth would return to the team in 2025. Caruth began the 2025 season with a 30th place DNF at Daytona. He would earn his first win of the season at Nashville. He advanced into the playoffs for a second year and was eliminated at the conclusion of the Round of 8 at Martinsville.

On April 1st, 2026, it was announced that the No. 71 truck would return at Bristol, with Daniel Suárez driving. Connor Zilisch would drive the No. 71 truck at Watkins Glen. He would also drive the No. 71 at New Hampshire. Shane van Gisbergen will run the No. 71 truck at Charlotte and North Wilkesboro.

==== Truck No. 71 results ====
Year	Driver	No.	Make	1	2	3	4	5	6	7	8	9	10	11	12	13	14	15	16	17	18	19	20	21	22	23	24	25	Owners	Pts
2024	Rajah Caruth	71	Chevy	DAY; 3	ATL; 8	LVS; 1	BRI; 8	COA; 15	MAR; 7	TEX; 12	KAN; 13	DAR; 30	NWS; 14	CLT; 17	GTW; 16	NSH; 4	POC; 10	IRP; 8	RCH; 17	MLW; 18	BRI; 3	KAN; 7	TAL; 4	HOM; 8	MAR; 31	PHO; 13			7th	2213
2025	Rajah Caruth	71	Chevy	DAY; 30	ATL; 29	LVS; 7	HOM; 22	MAR; 8	BRI; 9	CAR; 4	TEX; 3	KAN; 21	NWS; 15	CLT; 9	NSH; 1*	MCH; 31	POC; 10	LRP; 21	IRP; 10	GLN; 32	RCH; 19	DAR; 12	BRI; 15	NHA; 10	ROV; 4	TAL; 9	MAR; 34	PHO; 5	6th	2237
2026	Daniel Suárez	71	Chevy	DAY	ATL	STP	DAR	CAR	BRI; 18	TEX																			35th	173
2026	Connor Zilisch	71	Chevy								GLN; 2*	DOV									NHA; 5	BRI	KAN	CLT	PHO	TAL	MAR	HOM	35th	173
2026	Shane van Gisbergen	71	Chevy										CLT; 15	NSH	MCH	COR	LRP	NWS; 3	IRP	RCH									35th	173

=== Truck No. 77 History ===
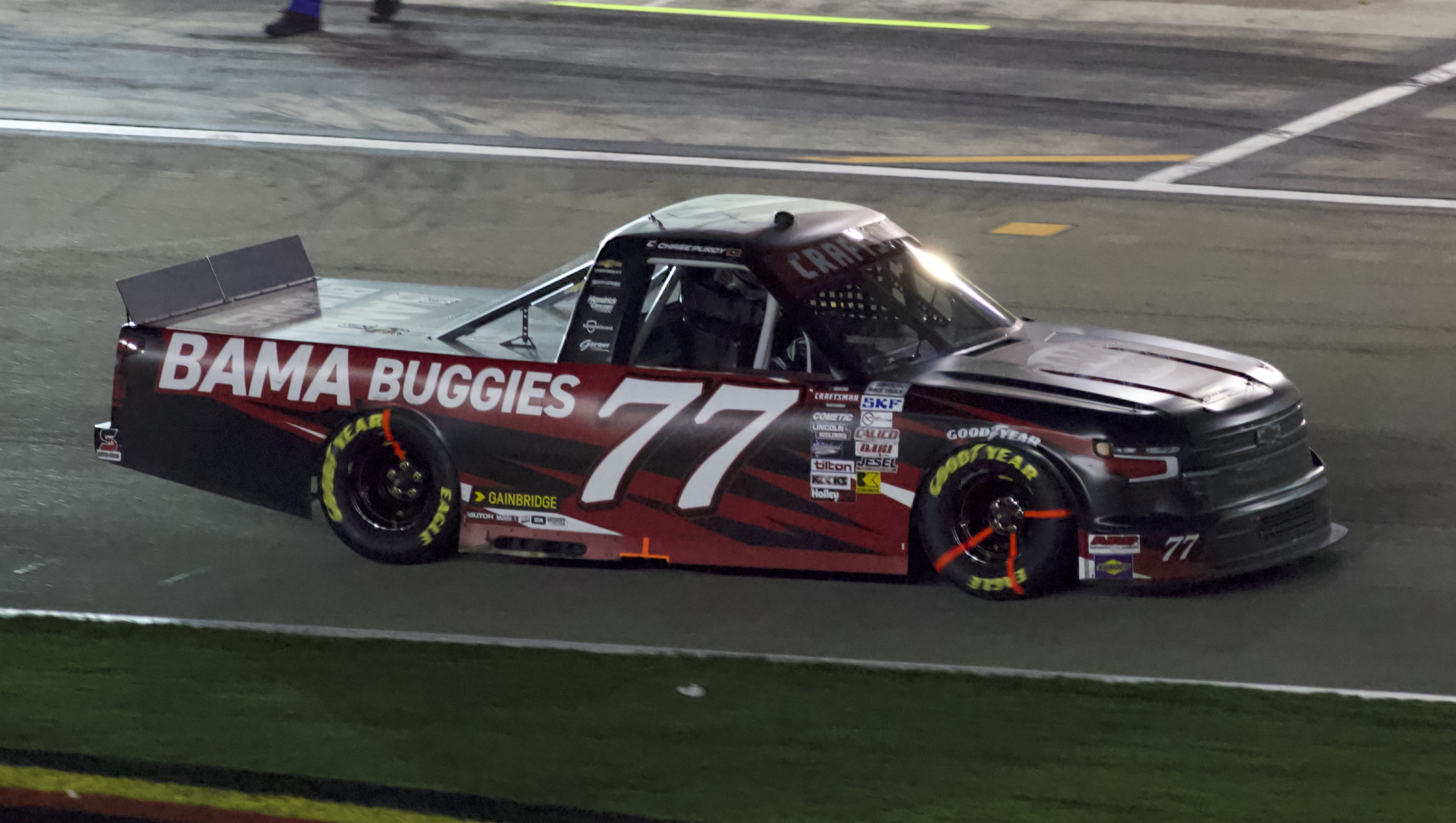
Purdy at Las Vegas in 2024

In 2023, Spire fielded the No. 77 Chevrolet Silverado for Derek Kraus at the season finale at Phoenix.

In 2024, the No. 77 was driven full-time by Chase Purdy.

On January 23, 2025, it was announced that Andrés Pérez de Lara will drive the No. 77 full-time. Pérez departed the organization midway through the season. Corey LaJoie, who was scheduled to drive the last eight races of the season in the No. 07 for Spire, instead moved to the No. 77 due to the departure of Pérez and the shutdown of No. 07 after Watkins Glen.

On January 29, 2026, it was announced that Carson Hocevar would run the season opening race at Daytona in the No. 77 truck with sponsorship from IKEA and Best Buy. After signing a five-year contract extension with the team, it was also announced Hocevar would drive in 13 NASCAR Craftsman Truck Series races in 2026. Former IndyCar driver James Hinchcliffe would make his NASCAR Craftsman Truck Series debut at St. Petersburg in the No. 77 truck. Connor Zilisch would drive the No. 77 at Charlotte. Jesse Love would drive the No. 77 at Nashville. Trackhouse Racing owner Justin Marks would drive the No. 77 at San Diego. Parker Kligerman drove the No. 77 at Lime Rock Park. Nick Sanchez will drive the No. 77 at IRP, Kansas, and Homestead. On July 30, it was announced that Tristan McKee will make his debut in the NASCAR Craftsman Truck Series at Richmond, driving the No. 77 truck. Aditionally, he will drive the No. 77 at New Hampshire, Bristol, Phoenix, and Martinsville. Rajah Caruth would drive the No. 77 at fall Charlotte race. Austin Green would drive the No. 77 at Talladega.

On October 7, 2026, it was announced that Kasey Kahne will drive the No. 77 full-time.

==== Truck No. 77 results ====
Year	Driver	No.	Make	1	2	3	4	5	6	7	8	9	10	11	12	13	14	15	16	17	18	19	20	21	22	23	24	25	Owners	Pts
2023	Derek Kraus	77	Chevy	DAY	LVS	ATL	COA	TEX	BRD	MAR	KAN	DAR	NWS	CLT	GTW	NSH	MOH	POC	RCH	IRP	MLW	KAN	BRI	TAL	HOM	PHO; 28			45th	9
2024	Chase Purdy	77	Chevy	DAY; 28	ATL; 15	LVS; 16	BRI; 33	COA; 22	MAR; 3	TEX; 25	KAN; 28	DAR; 6	NWS; 24	CLT; 14	GTW; 6	NSH; 21	POC; 6	IRP; 13	RCH; 20	MLW; 23	BRI; 6	KAN; 11	TAL; 25	HOM; 26	MAR; 3	PHO; 13			18th	513
2025	Andrés Pérez de Lara	77	Chevy	DAY; 14	ATL; 27	LVS; 17	HOM; 25	MAR; 7	BRI; 19	CAR; 12	TEX; 29	KAN; 19	NWS; 24	CLT; 16	NSH; 19	MCH; 9	POC; 16	LRP; 17	IRP; 22	GLN; 21									11th	726
2025	Corey LaJoie	77	Chevy																		RCH; 5	DAR; 20	BRI; 9	NHA; 8	ROV; 18	TAL; 8	MAR; 5	PHO; 7	11th	726
2026	Carson Hocevar	77	Chevy	DAY; 35*	ATL; 2		DAR; 22	ROC; 34	BRI; 9	TEX; 1*	GLN; 31	DOV; 31			MCH; 3*			NWS; 27											6th	2256
2026	James Hinchcliffe	77	Chevy			STP; 10																							6th	2256
2026	Connor Zilisch	77	Chevy										CLT; 3																6th	2256
2026	Jesse Love	77	Chevy											NSH; 34															6th	2256
2026	Justin Marks	77	Chevy													COR; 25													6th	2256
2026	Parker Kligerman	77	Chevy														LRP; 4												6th	2256
2026	Nick Sanchez	77	Chevy																IRP; 5				KAN; 28					HOM; 35	6th	2256
2026	Tristan McKee	77	Chevy																	RCH; 8	NHA; 6	BRI; 5			PHO; 14		MAR; 5		6th	2256
2026	Rajah Caruth	77	Chevy																					CLT; 31					6th	2256
2026	Austin Green	77	Chevy																							TAL; 3			6th	2256

== ARCA Menards Series ==
=== Car No. 77 history ===
On January 9, 2025, it was announced that Spire would field the No. 77 car in ARCA Menards Series for Corey Day beginning in the season-opener at Daytona.

==== Car No. 77 results ====
Year	Driver	No.	Make	1	2	3	4	5	6	7	8	9	10	11	12	13	14	15	16	17	18	19	20	AMSC	Pts
2025	Corey Day	77	Chevy	DAY; 22	PHO; 10	TAL	KAN	CLT	MCH	BLN	ELK	LRP	DOV	IRP	IOW							KAN; 23	TOL	33rd	125
2025	Tristan McKee	77	Chevy													GLN; 1	ISF	MAD	DSF	BRI	SLM			33rd	125

== ARCA Menards Series West ==
=== Car No. 77/7 history ===
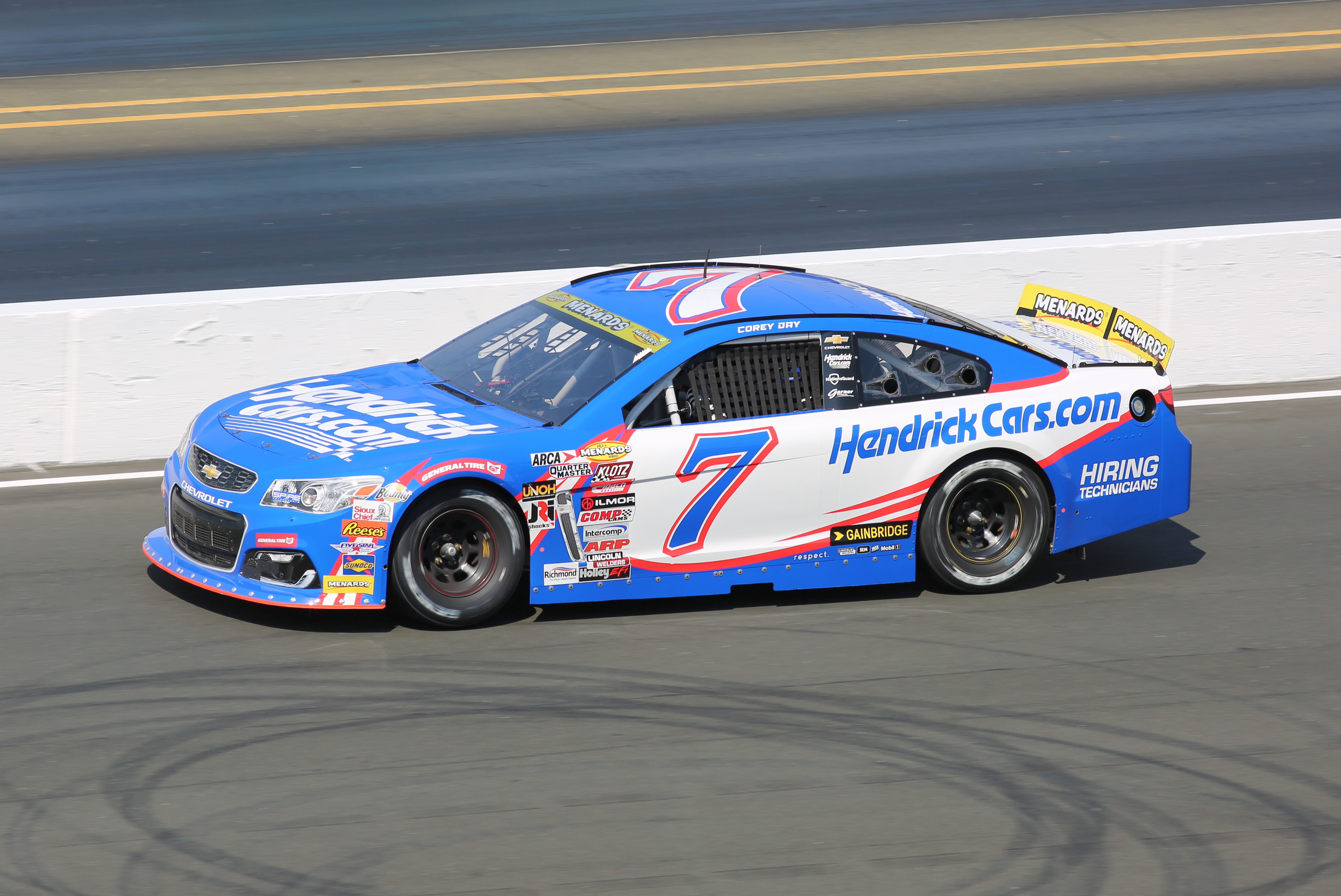
Corey Day in the No. 7 car at Sonoma Raceway in 2025

On January 9, 2025, it was announced that Spire would field the No. 77 car in ARCA Menards Series West for Corey Day at Phoenix. Corey Day would also drive the No. 7 car at Sonoma Raceway. Later that season, it was announced that the Spire's development driver Tristan McKee would drive the No. 77 car at season finale at Phoenix.

==== Car No. 77/7 results ====
Year	Driver	No.	Make	1	2	3	4	5	6	7	8	9	10	11	12	AMSWC	Pts
2025	Corey Day	77	Chevy	KER	PHO; 10	TUC	CNS	KER								24th	71
2025	Corey Day	7	Chevy						SON; 7	TRI	PIR	AAS	MAD	LVS		24th	71
2025	Tristan McKee	77	Chevy												PHO; 4	24th	71

== Other racing ==
=== CARS Tour ===
Tristan McKee ran in the CARS Tour in the No. 7 car for Spire in 2025, in a part-time effort. McKee won the Pro Late Model division at All American Speedway.

=== Trans-Am Series ===
Spire fielded the No. 28 for McKee in the TA2 class in the Trans-Am Series in 2025. He won his class at both Mid-Ohio Sports Car Course and Watkins Glen International.
