= 2024 Bank of America Roval 400 =

NASCAR Cup Series race

Race details
- Race 32 of 36 in the 2024 NASCAR Cup Series
- Date: October 13, 2024
- Location: Charlotte Motor Speedway in Concord, North Carolina
- Course: Permanent racing facility
- Course length: 2.32 miles (3.73 km)
- Distance: 109 laps, 252.9 mi (407 km)
- Average speed: 82.817 miles per hour (133.281 km/h)

Pole position
Driver	Shane van Gisbergen	Kaulig Racing
- Time: 1:22.704

Most laps led
Driver	Kyle Larson	Hendrick Motorsports
- Laps: 53

Winner
No. 5	Kyle Larson	Hendrick Motorsports

Television in the United States
- Network: NBC
- Announcers: Leigh Diffey, Jeff Burton and Steve Letarte
- Nielsen ratings: 2.4 million

Radio in the United States
- Radio: PRN
- Booth announcers: Doug Rice and Mark Garrow
- Turn announcers: Nick Yeoman (1, 2 & 3), Mike Jaynes (4, 5 & 6), Doug Turnbull (7, 8 & 9), Pat Patterson (10, 11 & 12) and Rob Albright (13, 14 & 15)

The 2024 Bank of America Roval 400 was a NASCAR Cup Series race held on October 13, 2024, at Charlotte Motor Speedway in Concord, North Carolina. Contested over 109 laps on the 2.32-mile (3.73 km) road course, it was the 32nd race of the 2024 NASCAR Cup Series season, the sixth race of the Playoffs, and the final race of the Round of 12. Kyle Larson won the race. Christopher Bell finished 2nd, and William Byron finished 3rd. Austin Cindric and Chase Elliott rounded out the top five, and A. J. Allmendinger, Shane van Gisbergen, Joey Logano, Bubba Wallace, and Ryan Blaney rounded out the top ten.

Originally, Joey Logano failed to make the Round of 8, however, Alex Bowman later failed post race inspection, relegating him to last place. Due to Bowman's points standings after the disqualification, Logano advanced into the Round of 8.

This race marked the final playoff appearance for Stewart–Haas Racing.

== Report ==
=== Background ===
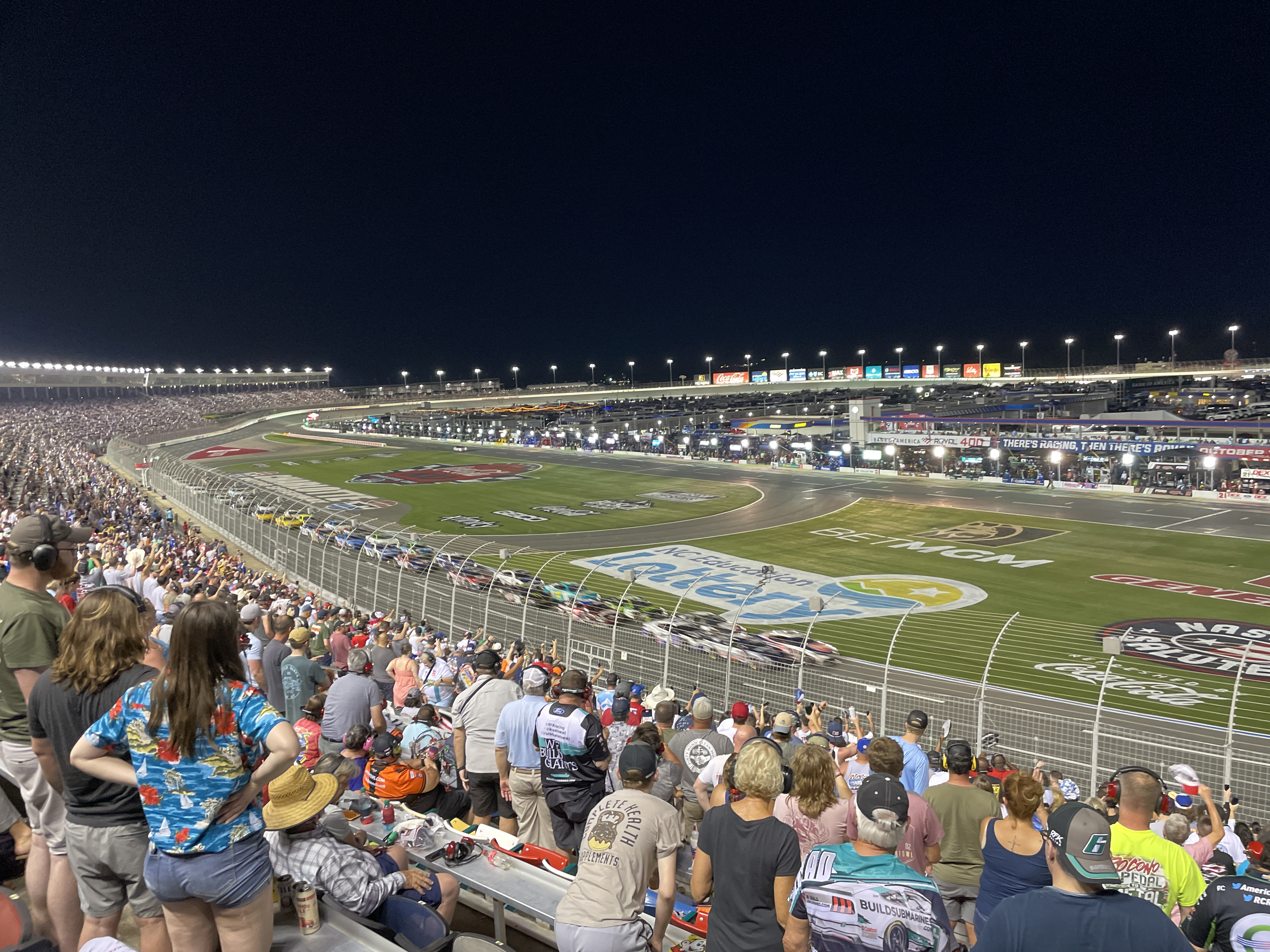
Charlotte Motor Speedway, the track where the race was held.

Since 2018, deviating from past NASCAR events at Charlotte, the race will utilize a road course configuration of Charlotte Motor Speedway, promoted and trademarked as the "Roval". The course is 2.28 miles (3.67 km) in length and features 17 turns, utilizing the infield road course and portions of the oval track. The race will be contested over a scheduled distance of 109 laps, 400 kilometres (250 mi).

During July 2018 tests on the road course, concerns were raised over drivers "cheating" the backstretch chicane on the course. The chicanes were modified with additional tire barriers and rumble strips in order to encourage drivers to properly drive through them, and NASCAR will enforce drive-through penalties on drivers who illegally "short-cut" parts of the course. The chicanes will not be used during restarts. In the summer of 2019, the bus stop on the backstretch was changed and deepened, becoming a permanent part of the circuit, compared to the previous year where it was improvised.

If a driver fails to legally make the backstretch bus stop, the driver must skip the frontstretch chicane and make a complete stop by the dotted line on the exit before being allowed to continue. A driver who misses the frontstretch chicane must stop before the exit.

On May 26, 2024, it was announced that the Charlotte Roval would get a redesign, featuring an updated infield road course which includes an extension of the straightaway after turn 5, a new turn 6, and a sharper hairpin for turn 7, in addition the apex for turn 16 on the final chicane was made tighter.

==== Entry list ====
- (R) denotes rookie driver.
- (P) denotes playoff driver.
- (i) denotes driver who is ineligible for series driver points.

No.	Driver	Team	Manufacturer
1	Ross Chastain	Trackhouse Racing	Chevrolet
2	Austin Cindric (P)	Team Penske	Ford
3	Austin Dillon	Richard Childress Racing	Chevrolet
4	Josh Berry (R)	Stewart-Haas Racing	Ford
5	Kyle Larson (P)	Hendrick Motorsports	Chevrolet
6	Brad Keselowski	RFK Racing	Ford
7	Justin Haley	Spire Motorsports	Chevrolet
8	Kyle Busch	Richard Childress Racing	Chevrolet
9	Chase Elliott (P)	Hendrick Motorsports	Chevrolet
10	Noah Gragson	Stewart-Haas Racing	Ford
11	Denny Hamlin (P)	Joe Gibbs Racing	Toyota
12	Ryan Blaney (P)	Team Penske	Ford
13	Shane van Gisbergen (i)	Kaulig Racing	Chevrolet
14	Chase Briscoe (P)	Stewart-Haas Racing	Ford
15	Kaz Grala (R)	Rick Ware Racing	Ford
16	A. J. Allmendinger (i)	Kaulig Racing	Chevrolet
17	Chris Buescher	RFK Racing	Ford
19	Martin Truex Jr.	Joe Gibbs Racing	Toyota
20	Christopher Bell (P)	Joe Gibbs Racing	Toyota
21	Harrison Burton	Wood Brothers Racing	Ford
22	Joey Logano (P)	Team Penske	Ford
23	Bubba Wallace	23XI Racing	Toyota
24	William Byron (P)	Hendrick Motorsports	Chevrolet
31	Daniel Hemric	Kaulig Racing	Chevrolet
34	Michael McDowell	Front Row Motorsports	Ford
38	Todd Gilliland	Front Row Motorsports	Ford
41	Ryan Preece	Stewart-Haas Racing	Ford
42	John Hunter Nemechek	Legacy Motor Club	Toyota
43	Erik Jones	Legacy Motor Club	Toyota
45	Tyler Reddick (P)	23XI Racing	Toyota
47	Ricky Stenhouse Jr.	JTG Daugherty Racing	Chevrolet
48	Alex Bowman (P)	Hendrick Motorsports	Chevrolet
51	Corey LaJoie	Rick Ware Racing	Ford
54	Ty Gibbs	Joe Gibbs Racing	Toyota
66	Josh Bilicki (i)	Power Source	Ford
71	Zane Smith (R)	Spire Motorsports	Chevrolet
77	Carson Hocevar (R)	Spire Motorsports	Chevrolet
99	Daniel Suárez (P)	Trackhouse Racing	Chevrolet
Official entry list

== Practice ==
Shane van Gisbergen was the fastest in the practice session with a time of 83.242 seconds and a speed of 98.604 mph (158.688 km/h).

=== Practice results ===
Pos	No.	Driver	Team	Manufacturer	Time	Speed
1	13	Shane van Gisbergen (i)	Kaulig Racing	Chevrolet	83.242	98.604
2	3	Austin Dillon	Richard Childress Racing	Chevrolet	83.463	98.343
3	12	Ryan Blaney (P)	Team Penske	Ford	83.496	98.304
Official practice results

== Qualifying ==
Shane van Gisbergen scored the pole for the race with a time of 1:22.704 and a speed of 99.246 mph (159.721 km/h).

=== Qualifying results ===
Pos	No.	Driver	Team	Manufacturer	R1	R2
1	13	Shane van Gisbergen (i)	Kaulig Racing	Chevrolet	1:22.697	1:22.704
2	45	Tyler Reddick (P)	23XI Racing	Toyota	1:22.715	1:22.761
3	16	A. J. Allmendinger (i)	Kaulig Racing	Chevrolet	1:23.208	1:23.015
4	22	Joey Logano (P)	Team Penske	Ford	1:23.215	1:23.166
5	2	Austin Cindric (P)	Team Penske	Ford	1:22.952	1:23.262
6	5	Kyle Larson (P)	Hendrick Motorsports	Chevrolet	1:22.930	1:23.330
7	9	Chase Elliott (P)	Hendrick Motorsports	Chevrolet	1:23.051	1:23.424
8	6	Brad Keselowski	RFK Racing	Ford	1:23.169	1:23.465
9	23	Bubba Wallace	23XI Racing	Toyota	1:23.083	1:23.568
10	24	William Byron (P)	Hendrick Motorsports	Chevrolet	1:22.955	1:23.614
11	8	Kyle Busch	Richard Childress Racing	Chevrolet	1:23.214	—
12	20	Christopher Bell (P)	Joe Gibbs Racing	Toyota	1:23.241	—
13	99	Daniel Suárez (P)	Trackhouse Racing	Chevrolet	1:23.367	—
14	12	Ryan Blaney (P)	Team Penske	Ford	1:23.360	—
15	38	Todd Gilliland	Front Row Motorsports	Ford	1:23.367	—
16	1	Ross Chastain	Trackhouse Racing	Chevrolet	1:23.519	—
17	48	Alex Bowman (P)	Hendrick Motorsports	Chevrolet	1:23.370	—
18	11	Denny Hamlin (P)	Joe Gibbs Racing	Toyota	1:23.607	—
19	54	Ty Gibbs	Joe Gibbs Racing	Toyota	1:23.434	—
20	77	Carson Hocevar (R)	Spire Motorsports	Chevrolet	1:23.722	—
21	34	Michael McDowell	Front Row Motorsports	Ford	1:23.495	—
22	3	Austin Dillon	Richard Childress Racing	Chevrolet	1:23.747	—
23	71	Zane Smith (R)	Spire Motorsports	Chevrolet	1:23.646	—
24	47	Ricky Stenhouse Jr.	JTG Daugherty Racing	Chevrolet	1:23.820	—
25	14	Chase Briscoe (P)	Stewart-Haas Racing	Ford	1:23.766	—
26	21	Harrison Burton	Wood Brothers Racing	Ford	1:23.897	—
27	31	Daniel Hemric	Kaulig Racing	Chevrolet	1:23.823	—
28	51	Corey LaJoie	Rick Ware Racing	Ford	1:23.964	—
29	17	Chris Buescher	RFK Racing	Ford	1:23.961	—
30	19	Martin Truex Jr.	Joe Gibbs Racing	Toyota	1:24.058	—
31	15	Kaz Grala (R)	Rick Ware Racing	Ford	1:23.968	—
32	10	Noah Gragson	Stewart-Haas Racing	Ford	1:24.133	—
33	7	Justin Haley	Spire Motorsports	Chevrolet	1:23.997	—
34	41	Ryan Preece	Stewart-Haas Racing	Ford	1:24.415	—
35	42	John Hunter Nemechek	Legacy Motor Club	Toyota	1:24.043	—
36	4	Josh Berry (R)	Stewart-Haas Racing	Ford	1:24.558	—
37	43	Erik Jones	Legacy Motor Club	Toyota	1:24.172	—
38	66	Josh Bilicki (i)	Power Source	Ford	1:26.163	—
Official qualifying results

== Race ==
=== Race results ===
==== Stage results ====
Stage One Laps: 25

Pos	No	Driver	Team	Manufacturer	Points
1	45	Tyler Reddick (P)	23XI Racing	Toyota	10
2	22	Joey Logano (P)	Team Penske	Ford	9
3	9	Chase Elliott (P)	Hendrick Motorsports	Chevrolet	8
4	12	Ryan Blaney (P)	Team Penske	Ford	7
5	5	Kyle Larson (P)	Hendrick Motorsports	Chevrolet	6
6	13	Shane van Gisbergen (i)	Kaulig Racing	Chevrolet	0
7	54	Ty Gibbs	Joe Gibbs Racing	Toyota	4
8	16	A. J. Allmendinger (i)	Kaulig Racing	Chevrolet	0
9	6	Brad Keselowski	RFK Racing	Ford	2
10	2	Austin Cindric (P)	Team Penske	Ford	1
Official stage one results

Stage Two Laps: 25

Pos	No	Driver	Team	Manufacturer	Points
1	16	A. J. Allmendinger (i)	Kaulig Racing	Chevrolet	0
2	22	Joey Logano (P)	Team Penske	Ford	9
3	9	Chase Elliott (P)	Hendrick Motorsports	Chevrolet	8
4	23	Bubba Wallace	23XI Racing	Toyota	7
5	12	Ryan Blaney (P)	Team Penske	Ford	6
6	2	Austin Cindric (P)	Team Penske	Ford	5
7	34	Michael McDowell	Front Row Motorsports	Ford	4
8	8	Kyle Busch	Richard Childress Racing	Chevrolet	3
9	5	Kyle Larson (P)	Hendrick Motorsports	Chevrolet	2
10	11	Denny Hamlin (P)	Joe Gibbs Racing	Toyota	1
Official stage two results

=== Final Stage results ===
Stage Three Laps: 59

Pos	Grid	No	Driver	Team	Manufacturer	Laps	Points
1	6	5	Kyle Larson (P)	Hendrick Motorsports	Chevrolet	109	48
2	12	20	Christopher Bell (P)	Joe Gibbs Racing	Toyota	109	35
3	10	24	William Byron (P)	Hendrick Motorsports	Chevrolet	109	34
4	5	2	Austin Cindric (P)	Team Penske	Ford	109	39
5	7	9	Chase Elliott (P)	Hendrick Motorsports	Chevrolet	109	48
6	3	16	A. J. Allmendinger (i)	Kaulig Racing	Chevrolet	109	0
7	1	13	Shane van Gisbergen (i)	Kaulig Racing	Chevrolet	109	0
8	4	22	Joey Logano (P)	Team Penske	Ford	109	47
9	9	23	Bubba Wallace	23XI Racing	Toyota	109	35
10	14	12	Ryan Blaney (P)	Team Penske	Ford	109	40
11	2	45	Tyler Reddick (P)	23XI Racing	Toyota	109	36
12	20	77	Carson Hocevar (R)	Spire Motorsports	Chevrolet	109	25
13	11	8	Kyle Busch	Richard Childress Racing	Chevrolet	109	27
14	18	11	Denny Hamlin (P)	Joe Gibbs Racing	Toyota	109	24
15	21	34	Michael McDowell	Front Row Motorsports	Ford	109	26
16	24	47	Ricky Stenhouse Jr.	JTG Daugherty Racing	Chevrolet	109	21
17	29	17	Chris Buescher	RFK Racing	Ford	109	20
18	15	38	Todd Gilliland	Front Row Motorsports	Ford	109	19
19	23	71	Zane Smith (R)	Spire Motorsports	Chevrolet	109	18
20	26	21	Harrison Burton	Wood Brothers Racing	Ford	109	17
21	30	19	Martin Truex Jr.	Joe Gibbs Racing	Toyota	109	16
22	36	4	Josh Berry (R)	Stewart-Haas Racing	Ford	109	15
23	8	6	Brad Keselowski	RFK Racing	Ford	109	16
24	27	31	Daniel Hemric	Kaulig Racing	Chevrolet	109	13
25	34	41	Ryan Preece	Stewart-Haas Racing	Ford	109	12
26	33	7	Justin Haley	Spire Motorsports	Chevrolet	109	11
27	31	15	Kaz Grala (R)	Rick Ware Racing	Ford	109	10
28	16	1	Ross Chastain	Trackhouse Racing	Chevrolet	109	9
29	38	66	Josh Bilicki (i)	Power Source	Ford	109	0
30	13	99	Daniel Suárez (P)	Trackhouse Racing	Chevrolet	108	7
31	32	10	Noah Gragson	Stewart-Haas Racing	Ford	108	6
32	22	3	Austin Dillon	Richard Childress Racing	Chevrolet	107	5
33	37	43	Erik Jones	Legacy Motor Club	Toyota	56	4
34	35	42	John Hunter Nemechek	Legacy Motor Club	Toyota	55	3
35	19	54	Ty Gibbs	Joe Gibbs Racing	Toyota	54	6
36	25	14	Chase Briscoe (P)	Stewart-Haas Racing	Ford	41	1
37	28	51	Corey LaJoie	Rick Ware Racing	Ford	3	1
DSQ	17	48	Alex Bowman (P) (Note: Bowman originally finished 18th and would have advanced to the round of 8, but was later disqualified and eliminated after his car was found to be underweight in post-race inspection.)	Hendrick Motorsports	Chevrolet	109	1
Official race results

=== Race statistics ===
- Lead changes: 7 among 6 different drivers
- Cautions/Laps: 5 for 13
- Red flags: 0
- Time of race: 3 hours, 0 minutes, and 3 seconds
- Average speed: 82.817 miles per hour (133.281 km/h)

== Media ==
=== Television ===
NBC covered the race on the television side. Leigh Diffey, Jeff Burton, and Steve Letarte called the race from the broadcast booth. Dave Burns, Kim Coon, and Marty Snider handled the pit road duties from pit lane.

NBC
Booth announcers	Pit reporters
Lap-by-lap: Leigh Diffey; Color-commentator: Jeff Burton; Color-commentator: Steve Letarte	Dave Burns; Kim Coon; Marty Snider

=== Radio ===
The race was broadcast on radio by the Performance Racing Network and simulcast on Sirius XM NASCAR Radio. Doug Rice and Mark Garrow called the race from the booth when the field raced down the front straightaway. IMS Radio's Nick Yeoman was assigned the entrance to the road course and into the Bank of America bridge (Turns 1–3). Voice of the Indianapolis 500 Mark Jaynes was assigned the action from the Bank of America bridge to the middle of the infield section. Doug Turnbull called the action exiting in infield into the oval Turn 1 banking (Turns 7–9). Pat Patterson called the action on the backstretch and into the bus stop. Rob Albright was assigned to the oval Turn 3-4 end. (Turns 13–15). On pit road, PRN was manned by Brad Gillie, Brett McMillan, Alan Cavanna, and Wendy Venturini.

PRN
Booth announcers	Turn announcers	Pit reporters
Lead announcer: Doug Rice; Announcer: Mark Garrow	Infield entrance: Nick Yeoman; Middle of Infield: Mark Jaynes; Exit of Infield: Doug Turnbull; Oval 2 to Bus Stop Pat Patterson; Oval 3/4: Rob Albright	Brad Gillie; Brett McMillan; Alan Cavanna; Wendy Venturini

== Standings after the race ==
Drivers' Championship standings

	Pos	Driver	Points
2	1	Kyle Larson	4,052
	2	Christopher Bell	4,032 (–20)
4	3	Tyler Reddick	4,029 (–23)
3	4	William Byron	4,023 (–29)
1	5	Ryan Blaney	4,019 (–33)
2	6	Denny Hamlin	4,015 (–37)
1	7	Chase Elliott	4,014 (–38)
1	8	Joey Logano	4,012 (–40)
4	9	Alex Bowman	2,195 (–1,857)
1	10	Austin Cindric	2,174 (–1,878)
2	11	Ty Gibbs	2,150 (–1,902)
2	12	Martin Truex Jr.	2,146 (–1,906)
3	13	Daniel Suárez	2,127 (–1,925)
1	14	Brad Keselowski	2,120 (–1,932)
3	15	Chase Briscoe	2,110 (–1,942)
	16	Harrison Burton	2,065 (–1,987)
Official driver's standings

Manufacturers' Championship standings

Pos	Manufacturer	Points
1	Chevrolet	1,174
2	Ford	1,120 (–54)
3	Toyota	1,119 (–55)

- Note: Only the first 16 positions are included for the driver standings.

== Notes ==
Previous race: 2024 YellaWood 500	NASCAR Cup Series; 2024 season	Next race: 2024 South Point 400
