= 2024 South Point 400 =

Race details
- Race 33 of 36 in the 2024 NASCAR Cup Series
- Date: October 20, 2024
- Location: Las Vegas Motor Speedway in Las Vegas, Nevada
- Course: Permanent racing facility
- Course length: 1.5 miles (2.4 km)
- Distance: 267 laps, 400.5 mi (640.8 km)
- Average speed: 139.385 miles per hour (224.318 km/h)

Pole position
| Driver | Christopher Bell | Joe Gibbs Racing |
- Time: 29.135

Most laps led
| Driver | Christopher Bell | Joe Gibbs Racing |
- Laps: 155

Winner
| No. 22 | Joey Logano | Team Penske |

Television in the United States
- Network: NBC
- Announcers: Leigh Diffey, Jeff Burton, and Steve Letarte
- Nielsen ratings: 2.3 million

Radio in the United States
- Radio: PRN
- Booth announcers: Doug Rice and Mark Garrow
- Turn announcers: Nick Yeoman (1 & 2) and Pat Patterson (3 & 4)

The 2024 South Point 400 was a NASCAR Cup Series race held on October 20, 2024, at Las Vegas Motor Speedway in Las Vegas, Nevada. Contested over 267 laps on the 1.5 mile (2.4 km) intermediate quad-oval, it was the 33rd race of the 2024 NASCAR Cup Series season, seventh race of the Playoffs, and first race of the Round of 8. Joey Logano won the race. Christopher Bell finished 2nd, and Daniel Suárez finished 3rd. William Byron and Alex Bowman rounded out the top five, and Martin Truex Jr., Ross Chastain, Denny Hamlin, John Hunter Nemechek, and Chris Buescher rounded out the top ten.

== Report ==
=== Background ===
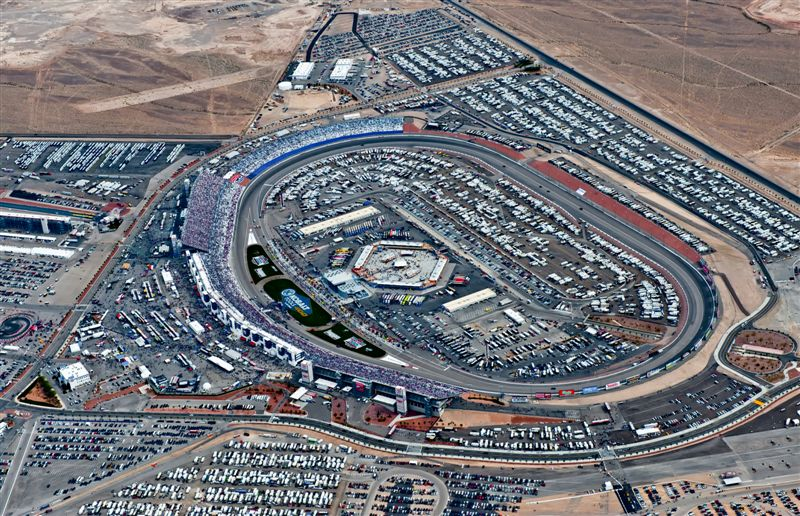
Las Vegas Motor Speedway, the track where the race was held.

Las Vegas Motor Speedway, located in Clark County, Nevada outside the Las Vegas city limits and about 15 miles northeast of the Las Vegas Strip, is a 1,200-acre (490 ha) complex of multiple tracks for motorsports racing. The complex is owned by Speedway Motorsports, Inc., which is headquartered in Charlotte, North Carolina.

==== Entry list ====
- (R) denotes rookie driver.
- (P) denotes playoff driver.
- (i) denotes driver who is ineligible for series driver points.

| No. | Driver | Team | Manufacturer |
|---|---|---|---|
| 1 | Ross Chastain | Trackhouse Racing | Chevrolet |
| 2 | Austin Cindric | Team Penske | Ford |
| 3 | Austin Dillon | Richard Childress Racing | Chevrolet |
| 4 | Josh Berry (R) | Stewart-Haas Racing | Ford |
| 5 | Kyle Larson (P) | Hendrick Motorsports | Chevrolet |
| 6 | Brad Keselowski | RFK Racing | Ford |
| 7 | Justin Haley | Spire Motorsports | Chevrolet |
| 8 | Kyle Busch | Richard Childress Racing | Chevrolet |
| 9 | Chase Elliott (P) | Hendrick Motorsports | Chevrolet |
| 10 | Noah Gragson | Stewart-Haas Racing | Ford |
| 11 | Denny Hamlin (P) | Joe Gibbs Racing | Toyota |
| 12 | Ryan Blaney (P) | Team Penske | Ford |
| 14 | Chase Briscoe | Stewart-Haas Racing | Ford |
| 15 | Cody Ware | Rick Ware Racing | Ford |
| 16 | Shane van Gisbergen (i) | Kaulig Racing | Chevrolet |
| 17 | Chris Buescher | RFK Racing | Ford |
| 19 | Martin Truex Jr. | Joe Gibbs Racing | Toyota |
| 20 | Christopher Bell (P) | Joe Gibbs Racing | Toyota |
| 21 | Harrison Burton | Wood Brothers Racing | Ford |
| 22 | Joey Logano (P) | Team Penske | Ford |
| 23 | Bubba Wallace | 23XI Racing | Toyota |
| 24 | William Byron (P) | Hendrick Motorsports | Chevrolet |
| 31 | Daniel Hemric | Kaulig Racing | Chevrolet |
| 34 | Michael McDowell | Front Row Motorsports | Ford |
| 38 | Todd Gilliland | Front Row Motorsports | Ford |
| 41 | Ryan Preece | Stewart-Haas Racing | Ford |
| 42 | John Hunter Nemechek | Legacy Motor Club | Toyota |
| 43 | Erik Jones | Legacy Motor Club | Toyota |
| 45 | Tyler Reddick (P) | 23XI Racing | Toyota |
| 47 | Ricky Stenhouse Jr. | JTG Daugherty Racing | Chevrolet |
| 48 | Alex Bowman | Hendrick Motorsports | Chevrolet |
| 51 | Corey LaJoie | Rick Ware Racing | Ford |
| 54 | Ty Gibbs | Joe Gibbs Racing | Toyota |
| 71 | Zane Smith (R) | Spire Motorsports | Chevrolet |
| 77 | Carson Hocevar (R) | Spire Motorsports | Chevrolet |
| 84 | Jimmie Johnson | Legacy Motor Club | Toyota |
| 99 | Daniel Suárez | Trackhouse Racing | Chevrolet |
Official entry list

== Practice ==
Tyler Reddick was the fastest in the practice session with a time of 29.478 seconds and a speed of 183.187 mph (294.811 km/h).

=== Practice results ===
| Pos | No. | Driver | Team | Manufacturer | Time | Speed |
|---|---|---|---|---|---|---|
| 1 | 45 | Tyler Reddick (P) | 23XI Racing | Toyota | 29.478 | 183.187 |
| 2 | 19 | Martin Truex Jr. | Joe Gibbs Racing | Toyota | 29.553 | 182.722 |
| 3 | 54 | Ty Gibbs | Joe Gibbs Racing | Toyota | 29.586 | 182.518 |
Official practice results

== Qualifying ==
Christopher Bell scored the pole for the race with a time of 29.135 and a speed of 185.344 mph (298.282 km/h).

=== Qualifying results ===
| Pos | No. | Driver | Team | Manufacturer | R1 | R2 |
|---|---|---|---|---|---|---|
| 1 | 20 | Christopher Bell (P) | Joe Gibbs Racing | Toyota | 29.153 | 29.135 |
| 2 | 45 | Tyler Reddick (P) | 23XI Racing | Toyota | 29.097 | 29.148 |
| 3 | 48 | Alex Bowman | Hendrick Motorsports | Chevrolet | 29.168 | 29.195 |
| 4 | 11 | Denny Hamlin (P) | Joe Gibbs Racing | Toyota | 29.256 | 29.181 |
| 5 | 5 | Kyle Larson (P) | Hendrick Motorsports | Chevrolet | 29.170 | 29.205 |
| 6 | 77 | Carson Hocevar (R) | Spire Motorsports | Chevrolet | 29.347 | 29.254 |
| 7 | 1 | Ross Chastain | Trackhouse Racing | Chevrolet | 29.151 | 29.219 |
| 8 | 54 | Ty Gibbs | Joe Gibbs Racing | Toyota | 29.309 | 29.275 |
| 9 | 24 | William Byron (P) | Hendrick Motorsports | Chevrolet | 29.134 | 29.242 |
| 10 | 22 | Joey Logano (P) | Team Penske | Ford | 29.306 | 29.287 |
| 11 | 2 | Austin Cindric | Team Penske | Ford | 29.247 | — |
| 12 | 19 | Martin Truex Jr. | Joe Gibbs Racing | Toyota | 29.358 | — |
| 13 | 3 | Austin Dillon | Richard Childress Racing | Chevrolet | 29.269 | — |
| 14 | 71 | Zane Smith (R) | Spire Motorsports | Chevrolet | 29.369 | — |
| 15 | 34 | Michael McDowell | Front Row Motorsports | Ford | 29.298 | — |
| 16 | 7 | Justin Haley | Spire Motorsports | Chevrolet | 29.371 | — |
| 17 | 6 | Brad Keselowski | RFK Racing | Ford | 29.334 | — |
| 18 | 9 | Chase Elliott (P) | Hendrick Motorsports | Chevrolet | 29.381 | — |
| 19 | 23 | Bubba Wallace | 23XI Racing | Toyota | 29.355 | — |
| 20 | 8 | Kyle Busch | Richard Childress Racing | Chevrolet | 29.461 | — |
| 21 | 10 | Noah Gragson | Stewart-Haas Racing | Ford | 29.381 | — |
| 22 | 17 | Chris Buescher | RFK Racing | Ford | 29.492 | — |
| 23 | 99 | Daniel Suárez | Trackhouse Racing | Chevrolet | 29.395 | — |
| 24 | 14 | Chase Briscoe | Stewart-Haas Racing | Ford | 29.592 | — |
| 25 | 47 | Ricky Stenhouse Jr. | JTG Daugherty Racing | Chevrolet | 29.430 | — |
| 26 | 42 | John Hunter Nemechek | Legacy Motor Club | Toyota | 29.623 | — |
| 27 | 43 | Erik Jones | Legacy Motor Club | Toyota | 29.434 | — |
| 28 | 4 | Josh Berry (R) | Stewart-Haas Racing | Ford | 29.663 | — |
| 29 | 84 | Jimmie Johnson | Legacy Motor Club | Toyota | 29.446 | — |
| 30 | 38 | Todd Gilliland | Front Row Motorsports | Ford | 30.006 | — |
| 31 | 21 | Harrison Burton | Wood Brothers Racing | Ford | 29.525 | — |
| 32 | 41 | Ryan Preece | Stewart-Haas Racing | Ford | 30.016 | — |
| 33 | 31 | Daniel Hemric | Kaulig Racing | Chevrolet | 29.527 | — |
| 34 | 16 | Shane van Gisbergen (i) | Kaulig Racing | Chevrolet | 30.457 | — |
| 35 | 51 | Corey LaJoie | Rick Ware Racing | Ford | 29.811 | — |
| 36 | 15 | Cody Ware | Rick Ware Racing | Ford | 30.912 | — |
| 37 | 12 | Ryan Blaney (P) | Team Penske | Ford | 0.000 | — |
Official qualifying results

== Race ==
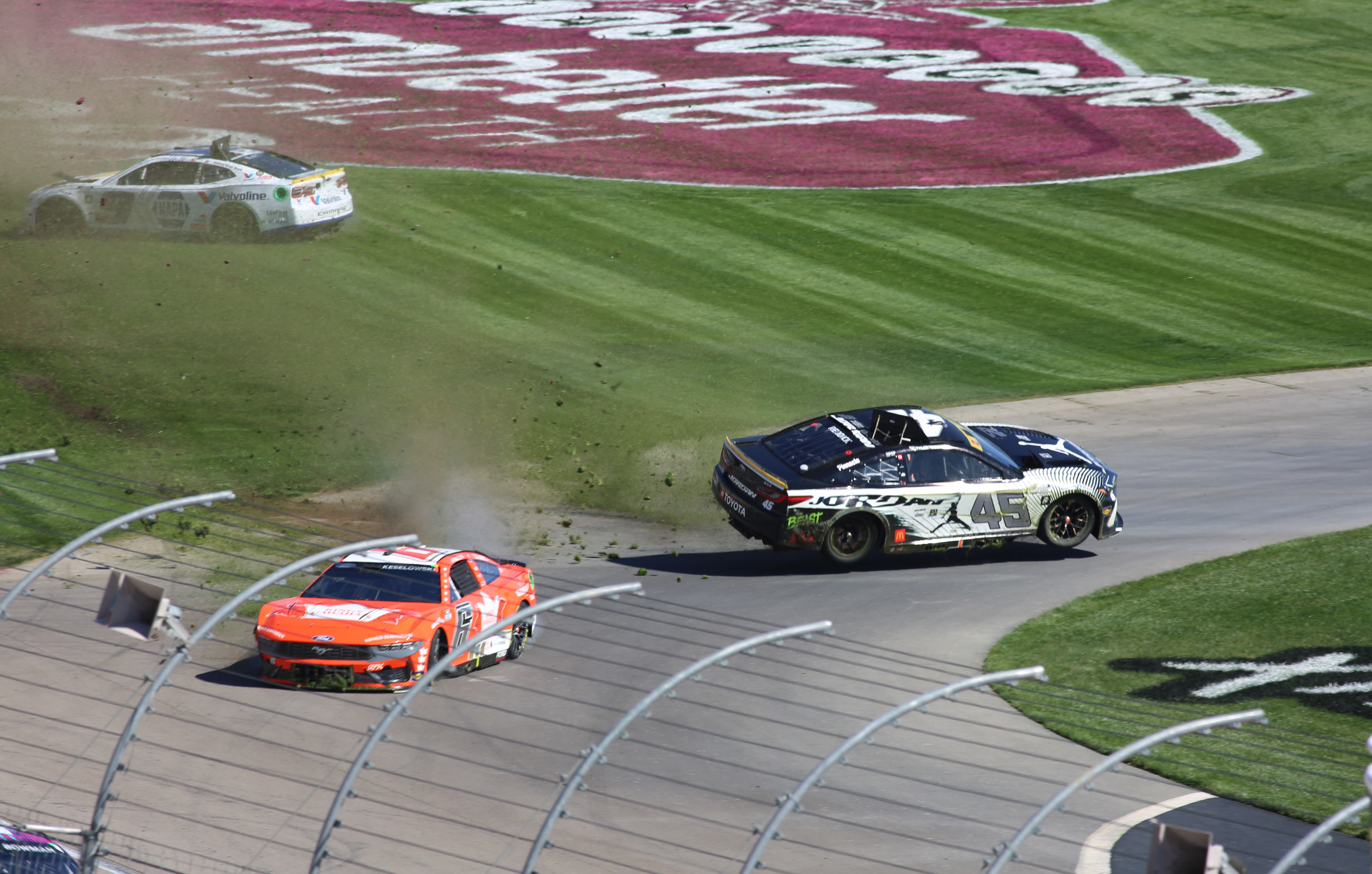
Tyler Reddick (45), Brad Keselowski (6), and Chase Elliot (9) wrecking exiting Turn 4 on lap 89.

=== Race results ===
==== Stage results ====
Stage One Laps: 80

| Pos | No | Driver | Team | Manufacturer | Points |
|---|---|---|---|---|---|
| 1 | 45 | Tyler Reddick (P) | 23XI Racing | Toyota | 10 |
| 2 | 20 | Christopher Bell (P) | Joe Gibbs Racing | Toyota | 9 |
| 3 | 19 | Martin Truex Jr. | Joe Gibbs Racing | Toyota | 8 |
| 4 | 24 | William Byron (P) | Hendrick Motorsports | Chevrolet | 7 |
| 5 | 6 | Brad Keselowski | RFK Racing | Ford | 6 |
| 6 | 54 | Ty Gibbs | Joe Gibbs Racing | Toyota | 5 |
| 7 | 17 | Chris Buescher | RFK Racing | Ford | 4 |
| 8 | 22 | Joey Logano (P) | Team Penske | Ford | 3 |
| 9 | 2 | Austin Cindric | Team Penske | Ford | 2 |
| 10 | 5 | Kyle Larson (P) | Hendrick Motorsports | Chevrolet | 1 |
Official stage one results

Stage Two Laps: 85

| Pos | No | Driver | Team | Manufacturer | Points |
|---|---|---|---|---|---|
| 1 | 20 | Christopher Bell (P) | Joe Gibbs Racing | Toyota | 10 |
| 2 | 19 | Martin Truex Jr. | Joe Gibbs Racing | Toyota | 9 |
| 3 | 24 | William Byron (P) | Hendrick Motorsports | Chevrolet | 8 |
| 4 | 17 | Chris Buescher | RFK Racing | Ford | 7 |
| 5 | 22 | Joey Logano (P) | Team Penske | Ford | 6 |
| 6 | 48 | Alex Bowman | Hendrick Motorsports | Chevrolet | 5 |
| 7 | 7 | Justin Haley | Spire Motorsports | Chevrolet | 4 |
| 8 | 99 | Daniel Suárez | Trackhouse Racing | Chevrolet | 3 |
| 9 | 23 | Bubba Wallace | 23XI Racing | Toyota | 2 |
| 10 | 41 | Ryan Preece | Stewart-Haas Racing | Ford | 1 |
Official stage two results

=== Final Stage results ===
Stage Three Laps: 102

| Pos | Grid | No | Driver | Team | Manufacturer | Laps | Points |
|---|---|---|---|---|---|---|---|
| 1 | 10 | 22 | Joey Logano (P) | Team Penske | Ford | 267 | 49 |
| 2 | 1 | 20 | Christopher Bell (P) | Joe Gibbs Racing | Toyota | 267 | 54 |
| 3 | 23 | 99 | Daniel Suárez | Trackhouse Racing | Chevrolet | 267 | 37 |
| 4 | 9 | 24 | William Byron (P) | Hendrick Motorsports | Chevrolet | 267 | 48 |
| 5 | 3 | 48 | Alex Bowman | Hendrick Motorsports | Chevrolet | 267 | 37 |
| 6 | 12 | 19 | Martin Truex Jr. | Joe Gibbs Racing | Toyota | 267 | 48 |
| 7 | 7 | 1 | Ross Chastain | Trackhouse Racing | Chevrolet | 267 | 30 |
| 8 | 4 | 11 | Denny Hamlin (P) | Joe Gibbs Racing | Toyota | 267 | 29 |
| 9 | 26 | 42 | John Hunter Nemechek | Legacy Motor Club | Toyota | 267 | 28 |
| 10 | 22 | 17 | Chris Buescher | RFK Racing | Ford | 267 | 38 |
| 11 | 5 | 5 | Kyle Larson (P) | Hendrick Motorsports | Chevrolet | 267 | 27 |
| 12 | 19 | 23 | Bubba Wallace | 23XI Racing | Toyota | 267 | 27 |
| 13 | 20 | 8 | Kyle Busch | Richard Childress Racing | Chevrolet | 267 | 24 |
| 14 | 35 | 51 | Corey LaJoie | Rick Ware Racing | Ford | 267 | 23 |
| 15 | 31 | 21 | Harrison Burton | Wood Brothers Racing | Ford | 267 | 22 |
| 16 | 14 | 71 | Zane Smith (R) | Spire Motorsports | Chevrolet | 267 | 21 |
| 17 | 16 | 7 | Justin Haley | Spire Motorsports | Chevrolet | 267 | 24 |
| 18 | 21 | 10 | Noah Gragson | Stewart-Haas Racing | Ford | 267 | 19 |
| 19 | 33 | 31 | Daniel Hemric | Kaulig Racing | Chevrolet | 267 | 18 |
| 20 | 15 | 34 | Michael McDowell | Front Row Motorsports | Ford | 267 | 17 |
| 21 | 36 | 15 | Cody Ware | Rick Ware Racing | Ford | 267 | 16 |
| 22 | 32 | 41 | Ryan Preece | Stewart-Haas Racing | Ford | 266 | 16 |
| 23 | 6 | 77 | Carson Hocevar (R) | Spire Motorsports | Chevrolet | 266 | 14 |
| 24 | 28 | 4 | Josh Berry (R) | Stewart-Haas Racing | Ford | 266 | 13 |
| 25 | 27 | 43 | Erik Jones | Legacy Motor Club | Toyota | 266 | 12 |
| 26 | 24 | 14 | Chase Briscoe | Stewart-Haas Racing | Ford | 266 | 11 |
| 27 | 25 | 47 | Ricky Stenhouse Jr. | JTG Daugherty Racing | Chevrolet | 266 | 10 |
| 28 | 29 | 84 | Jimmie Johnson | Legacy Motor Club | Toyota | 265 | 9 |
| 29 | 34 | 16 | Shane van Gisbergen (i) | Kaulig Racing | Chevrolet | 265 | 0 |
| 30 | 8 | 54 | Ty Gibbs | Joe Gibbs Racing | Toyota | 264 | 12 |
| 31 | 30 | 38 | Todd Gilliland | Front Row Motorsports | Ford | 263 | 6 |
| 32 | 37 | 12 | Ryan Blaney (P) | Team Penske | Ford | 259 | 5 |
| 33 | 18 | 9 | Chase Elliott (P) | Hendrick Motorsports | Chevrolet | 230 | 4 |
| 34 | 11 | 2 | Austin Cindric | Team Penske | Ford | 96 | 5 |
| 35 | 2 | 45 | Tyler Reddick (P) | 23XI Racing | Toyota | 89 | 12 |
| 36 | 17 | 6 | Brad Keselowski | RFK Racing | Ford | 89 | 7 |
| 37 | 13 | 3 | Austin Dillon | Richard Childress Racing | Chevrolet | 61 | 1 |
Official race results

=== Race statistics ===
- Lead changes: 13 among 10 different drivers
- Cautions/Laps: 5 for 32
- Red flags: 0
- Time of race: 2 hours, 52 minutes, and 24 seconds
- Average speed: 139.385 miles per hour (224.318 km/h)

== Media ==
=== Television ===
NBC covered the race on the television side. Leigh Diffey, Jeff Burton, and Steve Letarte called the race from the broadcast booth. Kim Coon, Marty Snider, and Dillon Welch handled the pit road duties from pit lane.

NBC
| Booth announcers | Pit reporters |
|---|---|
| Lap-by-lap: Leigh Diffey; Color-commentator: Jeff Burton; Color-commentator: Steve Letarte | Kim Coon; Marty Snider; Dillon Welch |

=== Radio ===
PRN covered their final 2024 broadcast, which was also simulcast on Sirius XM NASCAR Radio. Doug Rice & Mark Garrow covered the action for PRN when the field races down the front straightaway. Nick Yeoman covered the action for PRN from a platform outside of Turns 1 & 2, & Pat Patterson covered the action from a platform outside of Turns 3 & 4 for PRN. Brett McMillan, Brad Gillie and Wendy Venturini had the call from pit lane for PRN.

PRN
| Booth announcers | Turn announcers | Pit reporters |
|---|---|---|
| Lead announcer: Doug Rice; Announcer: Mark Garrow | Turns 1 & 2: Nick Yeoman; Turns 3 & 4: Pat Patterson | Brett McMillan; Brad Gillie; Wendy Venturini |

== Standings after the race ==
Drivers' Championship standings

| | Pos | Driver | Points |
|---|---|---|---|
| 1 | 1 | Christopher Bell | 4,086 |
| 1 | 2 | Kyle Larson | 4,079 (–7) |
| 1 | 3 | William Byron | 4,071 (–15) |
| 4 | 4 | Joey Logano | 4,061 (–25) |
| 1 | 5 | Denny Hamlin | 4,044 (–42) |
| 3 | 6 | Tyler Reddick | 4,041 (–45) |
| 2 | 7 | Ryan Blaney | 4,024 (–62) |
| 1 | 8 | Chase Elliott | 4,018 (–68) |
| | 9 | Alex Bowman | 2,232 (–1,854) |
| 2 | 10 | Martin Truex Jr. | 2,194 (–1,892) |
| 1 | 11 | Austin Cindric | 2,179 (–1,907) |
| 1 | 12 | Daniel Suárez | 2,165 (–1,921) |
| 2 | 13 | Ty Gibbs | 2,162 (–1,924) |
| | 14 | Brad Keselowski | 2,127 (–1,959) |
| | 15 | Chase Briscoe | 2,121 (–1,965) |
| | 16 | Harrison Burton | 2,087 (–1,999) |
Official driver's standings

Manufacturers' Championship standings

| Pos | Manufacturer | Points |
|---|---|---|
| 1 | Chevrolet | 1,208 |
| 2 | Ford | 1,160 (–48) |
| 3 | Toyota | 1,154 (–54) |

- Note: Only the first 16 positions are included for the driver standings.

| Previous race: 2024 Bank of America Roval 400 | NASCAR Cup Series; 2024 season | Next race: 2024 Straight Talk Wireless 400 |
