= 2022 Bank of America Roval 400 =

NASCAR Cup Series race

Race details
- Race 32 of 36 in the 2022 NASCAR Cup Series
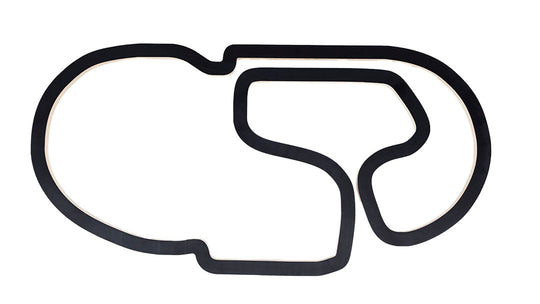
- Roval (2018–2023)
- Date: October 9, 2022
- Location: Charlotte Motor Speedway in Concord, North Carolina
- Course: Permanent racing facility
- Course length: 2.280 miles (3.669 km)
- Distance: 112 laps, 255.36 mi (411.009 km)
- Scheduled distance: 109 laps, 248.52 mi (400 km)
- Average speed: 86.661 miles per hour (139.467 km/h)

Pole position
| Driver | Joey Logano | Team Penske |
- Time: 1:20.755

Most laps led
| Driver | Chase Elliott | Hendrick Motorsports |
- Laps: 30

Winner
| No. 20 | Christopher Bell | Joe Gibbs Racing |

Television in the United States
- Network: NBC
- Announcers: Rick Allen, Jeff Burton, Steve Letarte and Dale Earnhardt Jr.

Radio in the United States
- Radio: PRN
- Booth announcers: Doug Rice and Mark Garrow
- Turn announcers: Nick Yeoman (1, 2 & 3), Mike Jaynes (4, 5 & 6), Doug Turnbull (7, 8 & 9), Pat Patterson (10, 11 & 12) and Rob Albright (13, 14 & 15)

The 2022 Bank of America Roval 400 was a NASCAR Cup Series race held on October 9, 2022, at Charlotte Motor Speedway in Concord, North Carolina. Contested over 112 laps—extended from 109 laps due to an overtime finish, on the 2.28-mile (3.67 km) road course, it was the 32nd race of the 2022 NASCAR Cup Series season, the sixth race of the Playoffs, and final race of the Round of 12.

== Report ==
=== Background ===
An aerial view of Charlotte Motor Speedway

Since 2018, deviating from past NASCAR events at Charlotte, the race will utilize a road course configuration of Charlotte Motor Speedway, promoted and trademarked as the "Roval". The course is 2.28 miles (3.67 km) in length and features 17 turns, utilizing the infield road course and portions of the oval track. The race will be contested over a scheduled distance of 109 laps, 400 kilometres (250 mi).

During July 2018 tests on the road course, concerns were raised over drivers "cheating" the backstretch chicane on the course. The chicanes were modified with additional tire barriers and rumble strips in order to encourage drivers to properly drive through them, and NASCAR will enforce drive-through penalties on drivers who illegally "short-cut" parts of the course. The chicanes will not be used during restarts. In the summer of 2019, the bus stop on the backstretch was changed and deepened, becoming a permanent part of the circuit, compared to the previous year where it was improvised.

If a driver fails to legally make the backstretch bus stop, the driver must skip the frontstretch chicane and make a complete stop by the dotted line on the exit before being allowed to continue. A driver who misses the frontstretch chicane must stop before the exit.

Noah Gragson continued his role as a replacement for Alex Bowman in the No. 48 car after Bowman suffered from concussion-like symptoms sustained after a rear impact crash at Texas. This absence effectively eliminated Bowman from the playoffs. Additionally, due to aftereffects of his Texas wreck, Cody Ware was replaced by J. J. Yeley in No. 51 car, although Ware had competed in the Talladega race.

==== Entry list ====
- (R) denotes rookie driver.
- (i) denotes driver who is ineligible for series driver points.

| No. | Driver | Team | Manufacturer |
|---|---|---|---|
| 1 | Ross Chastain | Trackhouse Racing Team | Chevrolet |
| 2 | Austin Cindric (R) | Team Penske | Ford |
| 3 | Austin Dillon | Richard Childress Racing | Chevrolet |
| 4 | Kevin Harvick | Stewart-Haas Racing | Ford |
| 5 | Kyle Larson | Hendrick Motorsports | Chevrolet |
| 6 | Brad Keselowski | RFK Racing | Ford |
| 7 | Corey LaJoie | Spire Motorsports | Chevrolet |
| 8 | Tyler Reddick | Richard Childress Racing | Chevrolet |
| 9 | Chase Elliott | Hendrick Motorsports | Chevrolet |
| 10 | Aric Almirola | Stewart-Haas Racing | Ford |
| 11 | Denny Hamlin | Joe Gibbs Racing | Toyota |
| 12 | Ryan Blaney | Team Penske | Ford |
| 14 | Chase Briscoe | Stewart-Haas Racing | Ford |
| 15 | Joey Hand | Rick Ware Racing | Ford |
| 16 | A. J. Allmendinger (i) | Kaulig Racing | Chevrolet |
| 17 | Chris Buescher | RFK Racing | Ford |
| 18 | Kyle Busch | Joe Gibbs Racing | Toyota |
| 19 | Martin Truex Jr. | Joe Gibbs Racing | Toyota |
| 20 | Christopher Bell | Joe Gibbs Racing | Toyota |
| 21 | Harrison Burton (R) | Wood Brothers Racing | Ford |
| 22 | Joey Logano | Team Penske | Ford |
| 23 | Ty Gibbs (i) | 23XI Racing | Toyota |
| 24 | William Byron | Hendrick Motorsports | Chevrolet |
| 26 | Daniil Kvyat | Team Hezeberg powered by Reaume Brothers Racing | Toyota |
| 27 | Loris Hezemans (i) | Team Hezeberg powered by Reaume Brothers Racing | Ford |
| 31 | Justin Haley | Kaulig Racing | Chevrolet |
| 34 | Michael McDowell | Front Row Motorsports | Ford |
| 38 | Todd Gilliland (R) | Front Row Motorsports | Ford |
| 41 | Cole Custer | Stewart-Haas Racing | Ford |
| 42 | Ty Dillon | Petty GMS Motorsports | Chevrolet |
| 43 | Erik Jones | Petty GMS Motorsports | Chevrolet |
| 45 | Bubba Wallace | 23XI Racing | Toyota |
| 47 | Ricky Stenhouse Jr. | JTG Daugherty Racing | Chevrolet |
| 48 | Noah Gragson (i) | Hendrick Motorsports | Chevrolet |
| 50 | Conor Daly | The Money Team Racing | Chevrolet |
| 51 | J. J. Yeley (i) | Rick Ware Racing | Ford |
| 77 | Mike Rockenfeller | Spire Motorsports | Chevrolet |
| 78 | Josh Williams (i) | Live Fast Motorsports | Ford |
| 99 | Daniel Suárez | Trackhouse Racing Team | Chevrolet |
Official entry list

== Practice ==
A. J. Allmendinger was the fastest in the practice session with a time of 1:21.732 seconds and a speed of 102.188 mph (164.456 km/h).

=== Practice results ===
| Pos | No. | Driver | Team | Manufacturer | Time | Speed |
|---|---|---|---|---|---|---|
| 1 | 16 | A. J. Allmendinger (i) | Kaulig Racing | Chevrolet | 1:21.732 | 102.188 |
| 2 | 2 | Austin Cindric (R) | Team Penske | Ford | 1:21.798 | 102.105 |
| 3 | 24 | William Byron | Hendrick Motorsports | Chevrolet | 1:21.809 | 102.091 |
Official practice results

== Qualifying ==
Joey Logano scored the pole for the race with a time of 1:20.755 and a speed of 103.424 mph (166.445 km/h).

=== Qualifying results ===
| Pos | No. | Driver | Team | Manufacturer | R1 | R2 |
|---|---|---|---|---|---|---|
| 1 | 22 | Joey Logano | Team Penske | Ford | 1:21.243 | 1:20.755 |
| 2 | 24 | William Byron | Hendrick Motorsports | Chevrolet | 1:21.180 | 1:20.852 |
| 3 | 99 | Daniel Suárez | Trackhouse Racing Team | Chevrolet | 1:20.829 | 1:21.006 |
| 4 | 8 | Tyler Reddick | Richard Childress Racing | Chevrolet | 1:21.069 | 1:21.018 |
| 5 | 2 | Austin Cindric (R) | Team Penske | Ford | 1:21.317 | 1:21.290 |
| 6 | 12 | Ryan Blaney | Team Penske | Ford | 1:21.046 | 1:21.336 |
| 7 | 16 | A. J. Allmendinger (i) | Kaulig Racing | Chevrolet | 1:21.006 | 1:21.646 |
| 8 | 20 | Christopher Bell | Joe Gibbs Racing | Toyota | 1:21.450 | 1:21.811 |
| 9 | 9 | Chase Elliott | Hendrick Motorsports | Chevrolet | 1:21.633 | 1:22.087 |
| 10 | 1 | Ross Chastain | Trackhouse Racing Team | Chevrolet | 1:21.488 | 1:46.131 |
| 11 | 34 | Michael McDowell | Front Row Motorsports | Ford | 1:21.605 | — |
| 12 | 41 | Cole Custer | Stewart-Haas Racing | Ford | 1:21.712 | — |
| 13 | 31 | Justin Haley | Kaulig Racing | Chevrolet | 1:21.718 | — |
| 14 | 45 | Bubba Wallace | 23XI Racing | Toyota | 1:21.726 | — |
| 15 | 3 | Austin Dillon | Richard Childress Racing | Chevrolet | 1:21.757 | — |
| 16 | 23 | Ty Gibbs (i) | 23XI Racing | Toyota | 1:21.770 | — |
| 17 | 14 | Chase Briscoe | Stewart-Haas Racing | Ford | 1:21.813 | — |
| 18 | 5 | Kyle Larson | Hendrick Motorsports | Chevrolet | 1:21.878 | — |
| 19 | 19 | Martin Truex Jr. | Joe Gibbs Racing | Toyota | 1:22.000 | — |
| 20 | 18 | Kyle Busch | Joe Gibbs Racing | Toyota | 1:22.019 | — |
| 21 | 17 | Chris Buescher | RFK Racing | Ford | 1:22.234 | — |
| 22 | 4 | Kevin Harvick | Stewart-Haas Racing | Ford | 1:22.460 | — |
| 23 | 21 | Harrison Burton (R) | Wood Brothers Racing | Ford | 1:22.491 | — |
| 24 | 11 | Denny Hamlin | Joe Gibbs Racing | Toyota | 1:22.496 | — |
| 25 | 47 | Ricky Stenhouse Jr. | JTG Daugherty Racing | Chevrolet | 1:22.502 | — |
| 26 | 43 | Erik Jones | Petty GMS Motorsports | Chevrolet | 1:22.538 | — |
| 27 | 15 | Joey Hand | Rick Ware Racing | Ford | 1:22.538 | — |
| 28 | 42 | Ty Dillon | Petty GMS Motorsports | Chevrolet | 1:22.558 | — |
| 29 | 48 | Noah Gragson (i) | Hendrick Motorsports | Chevrolet | 1:22.583 | — |
| 30 | 7 | Corey LaJoie | Spire Motorsports | Chevrolet | 1:22.741 | — |
| 31 | 6 | Brad Keselowski | RFK Racing | Ford | 1:22.832 | — |
| 32 | 38 | Todd Gilliland (R) | Front Row Motorsports | Ford | 1:22.908 | — |
| 33 | 26 | Daniil Kvyat | Team Hezeburg powered by Reaume Brothers Racing | Toyota | 1:22.940 | — |
| 34 | 77 | Mike Rockenfeller | Spire Motorsports | Chevrolet | 1:23.276 | — |
| 35 | 51 | J. J. Yeley (i) | Rick Ware Racing | Ford | 1:23.905 | — |
| 36 | 27 | Loris Hezemans (i) | Team Hezeburg powered by Reaume Brothers Racing | Ford | 1:24.060 | — |
| 37 | 10 | Aric Almirola | Stewart-Haas Racing | Ford | 0.000 | — |
| 38 | 78 | Josh Williams (i) | Live Fast Motorsports | Ford | 0.000 | — |
| 39 | 50 | Conor Daly | The Money Team Racing | Chevrolet | 0.000 | — |
Official qualifying results

== Race ==
=== Stage Results ===
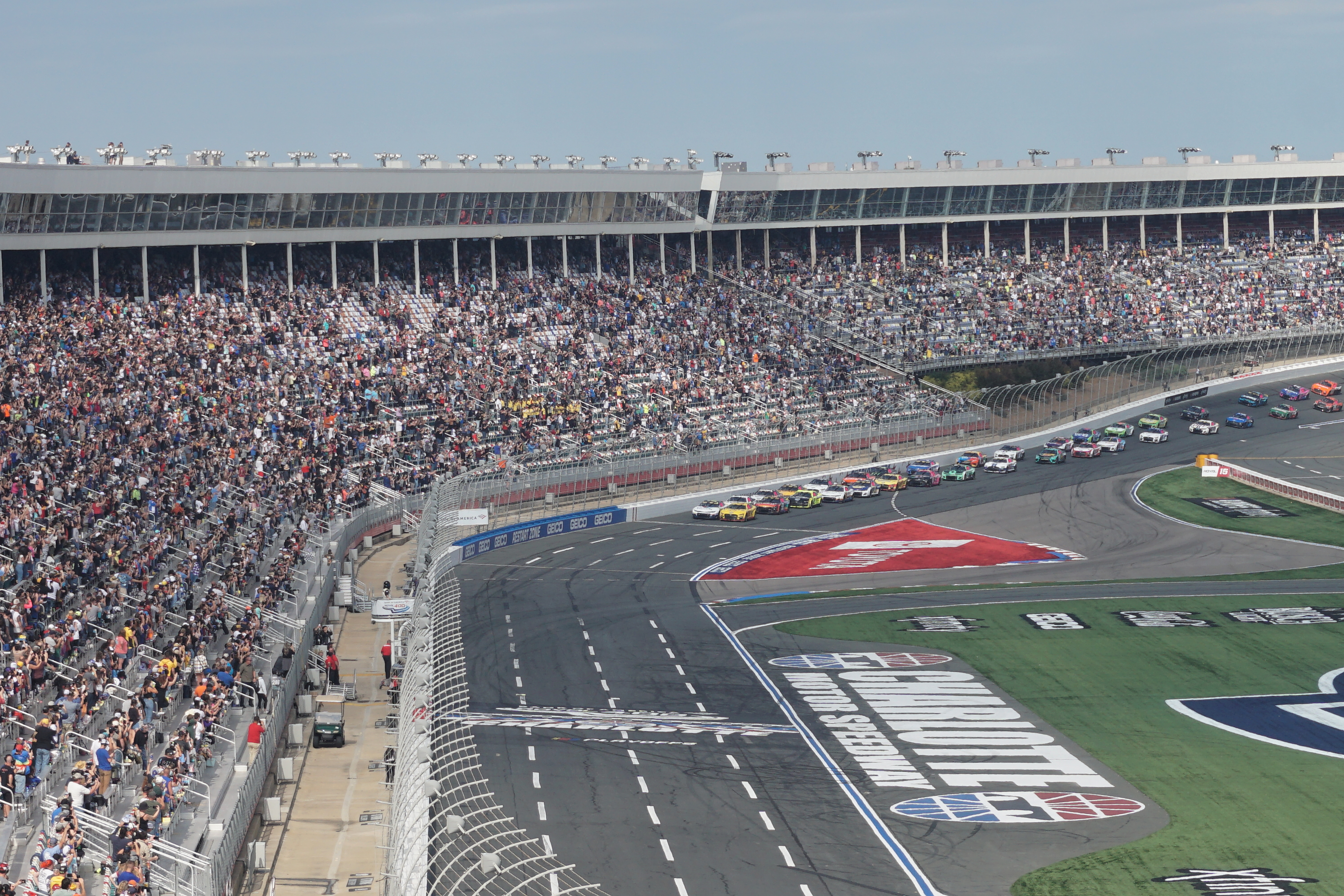
The start of the race

Stage One Laps: 25

| Pos | No | Driver | Team | Manufacturer | Points |
|---|---|---|---|---|---|
| 1 | 22 | Joey Logano | Team Penske | Ford | 10 |
| 2 | 24 | William Byron | Hendrick Motorsports | Chevrolet | 9 |
| 3 | 99 | Daniel Suárez | Trackhouse Racing Team | Chevrolet | 8 |
| 4 | 12 | Ryan Blaney | Team Penske | Ford | 7 |
| 5 | 2 | Austin Cindric (R) | Team Penske | Ford | 6 |
| 6 | 5 | Kyle Larson | Hendrick Motorsports | Chevrolet | 5 |
| 7 | 14 | Chase Briscoe | Stewart-Haas Racing | Ford | 4 |
| 8 | 11 | Denny Hamlin | Joe Gibbs Racing | Toyota | 3 |
| 9 | 8 | Tyler Reddick | Richard Childress Racing | Chevrolet | 2 |
| 10 | 16 | A. J. Allmendinger (i) | Kaulig Racing | Chevrolet | 0 |
Official stage one results

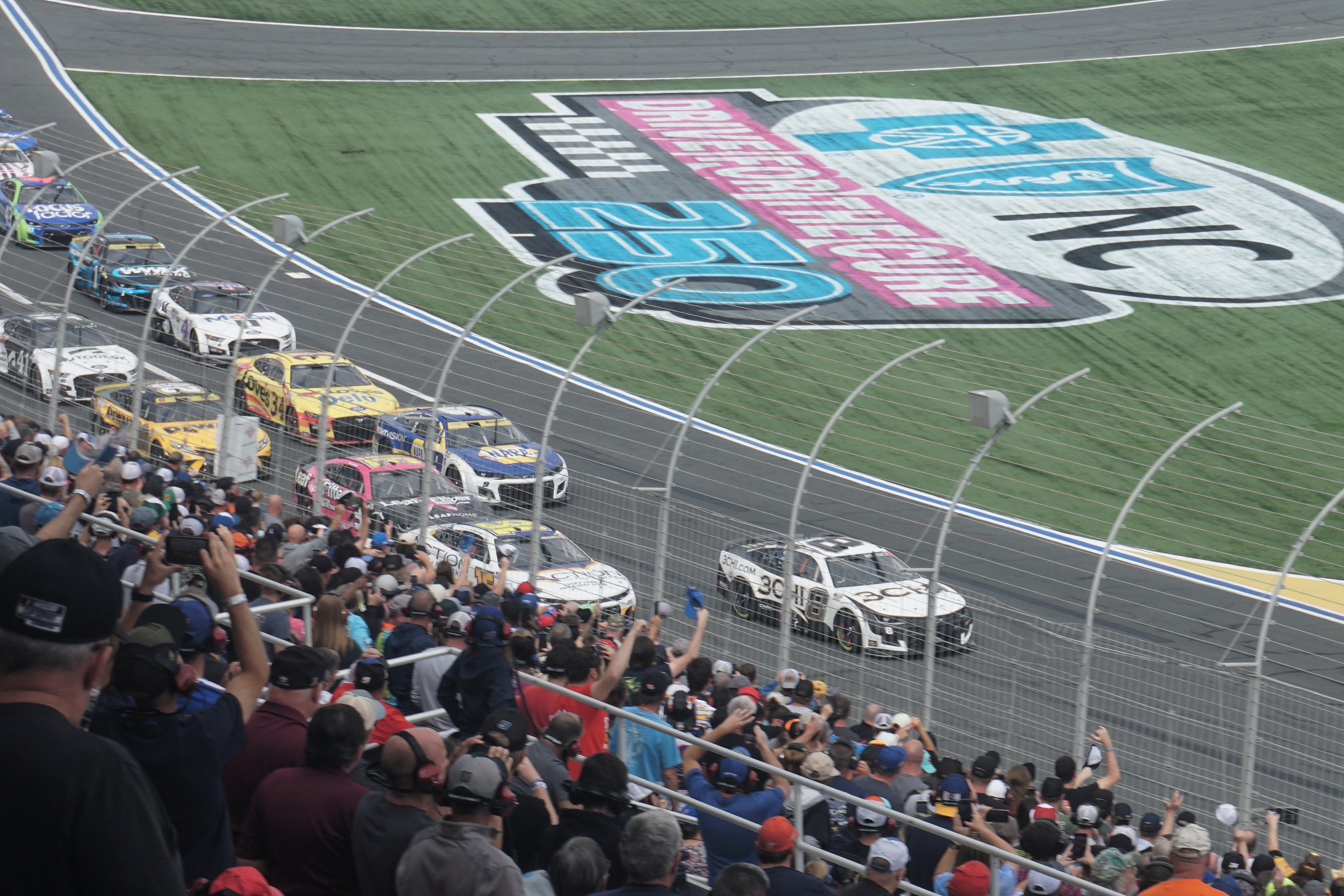
A restart during the race

Stage Two Laps: 25

| Pos | No | Driver | Team | Manufacturer | Points |
|---|---|---|---|---|---|
| 1 | 1 | Ross Chastain | Trackhouse Racing Team | Chevrolet | 10 |
| 2 | 21 | Harrison Burton (R) | Wood Brothers Racing | Ford | 9 |
| 3 | 5 | Kyle Larson | Hendrick Motorsports | Chevrolet | 8 |
| 4 | 16 | A. J. Allmendinger (i) | Kaulig Racing | Chevrolet | 0 |
| 5 | 8 | Tyler Reddick | Richard Childress Racing | Chevrolet | 6 |
| 6 | 99 | Daniel Suárez | Trackhouse Racing Team | Chevrolet | 5 |
| 7 | 22 | Joey Logano | Team Penske | Ford | 4 |
| 8 | 14 | Chase Briscoe | Stewart-Haas Racing | Ford | 3 |
| 9 | 12 | Ryan Blaney | Team Penske | Ford | 2 |
| 10 | 9 | Chase Elliott | Hendrick Motorsports | Chevrolet | 1 |
Official stage two results

=== Final Stage Results ===
Stage Three Laps: 59

| Pos | Grid | No | Driver | Team | Manufacturer | Laps | Points |
|---|---|---|---|---|---|---|---|
| 1 | 8 | 20 | Christopher Bell | Joe Gibbs Racing | Toyota | 112 | 40 |
| 2 | 22 | 4 | Kevin Harvick | Stewart-Haas Racing | Ford | 112 | 35 |
| 3 | 20 | 18 | Kyle Busch | Joe Gibbs Racing | Toyota | 112 | 34 |
| 4 | 7 | 16 | A. J. Allmendinger (i) | Kaulig Racing | Chevrolet | 112 | 0 |
| 5 | 13 | 31 | Justin Haley | Kaulig Racing | Chevrolet | 112 | 32 |
| 6 | 21 | 17 | Chris Buescher | RFK Racing | Ford | 112 | 31 |
| 7 | 14 | 45 | Bubba Wallace | 23XI Racing | Toyota | 112 | 30 |
| 8 | 4 | 8 | Tyler Reddick | Richard Childress Racing | Chevrolet | 112 | 37 |
| 9 | 17 | 14 | Chase Briscoe | Stewart-Haas Racing | Ford | 112 | 35 |
| 10 | 15 | 3 | Austin Dillon | Richard Childress Racing | Chevrolet | 112 | 27 |
| 11 | 26 | 43 | Erik Jones | Petty GMS Motorsports | Chevrolet | 112 | 26 |
| 12 | 30 | 7 | Corey LaJoie | Spire Motorsports | Chevrolet | 112 | 25 |
| 13 | 24 | 11 | Denny Hamlin | Joe Gibbs Racing | Toyota | 112 | 27 |
| 14 | 31 | 6 | Brad Keselowski | RFK Racing | Ford | 112 | 23 |
| 15 | 37 | 10 | Aric Almirola | Stewart-Haas Racing | Ford | 112 | 22 |
| 16 | 2 | 24 | William Byron | Hendrick Motorsports | Chevrolet | 112 | 30 |
| 17 | 19 | 19 | Martin Truex Jr. | Joe Gibbs Racing | Toyota | 112 | 20 |
| 18 | 1 | 22 | Joey Logano | Team Penske | Ford | 112 | 33 |
| 19 | 25 | 47 | Ricky Stenhouse Jr. | JTG Daugherty Racing | Chevrolet | 112 | 18 |
| 20 | 9 | 9 | Chase Elliott | Hendrick Motorsports | Chevrolet | 112 | 18 |
| 21 | 5 | 2 | Austin Cindric (R) | Team Penske | Ford | 112 | 22 |
| 22 | 16 | 23 | Ty Gibbs (i) | 23XI Racing | Toyota | 112 | 0 |
| 23 | 29 | 48 | Noah Gragson (i) | Hendrick Motorsports | Chevrolet | 112 | 0 |
| 24 | 12 | 41 | Cole Custer | Stewart-Haas Racing | Ford | 112 | 13 |
| 25 | 28 | 42 | Ty Dillon | Petty GMS Motorsports | Chevrolet | 112 | 12 |
| 26 | 6 | 12 | Ryan Blaney | Team Penske | Ford | 112 | 20 |
| 27 | 11 | 34 | Michael McDowell | Front Row Motorsports | Ford | 112 | 10 |
| 28 | 23 | 21 | Harrison Burton (R) | Wood Brothers Racing | Ford | 111 | 18 |
| 29 | 34 | 77 | Mike Rockenfeller | Spire Motorsports | Chevrolet | 111 | 8 |
| 30 | 32 | 38 | Todd Gilliland (R) | Front Row Motorsports | Ford | 111 | 7 |
| 31 | 38 | 78 | Josh Williams (i) | Live Fast Motorsports | Chevrolet | 110 | 0 |
| 32 | 35 | 51 | J. J. Yeley (i) | Rick Ware Racing | Ford | 110 | 0 |
| 33 | 36 | 27 | Loris Hezemans (i) | Team Hezeburg powered by Reaume Brothers Racing | Ford | 110 | 0 |
| 34 | 39 | 50 | Conor Daly | The Money Team Racing | Chevrolet | 109 | 3 |
| 35 | 18 | 5 | Kyle Larson | Hendrick Motorsports | Chevrolet | 107 | 15 |
| 36 | 3 | 99 | Daniel Suárez | Trackhouse Racing Team | Chevrolet | 107 | 14 |
| 37 | 10 | 1 | Ross Chastain | Trackhouse Racing Team | Chevrolet | 103 | 11 |
| 38 | 27 | 15 | Joey Hand | Rick Ware Racing | Ford | 79 | 1 |
| 39 | 33 | 26 | Daniil Kvyat | Team Hezeburg powered by Reaume Brothers Racing | Toyota | 17 | 1 |
Official race results

=== Race statistics ===
- Lead changes: 10 among 8 different drivers
- Cautions/Laps: 4 for 10 laps
- Red flags: 1 for 6 minutes, 10 seconds
- Time of race: 2 hours, 59 minutes and 54 seconds
- Average speed: 86.661 miles per hour (139.467 km/h)

=== Penalties ===
Following the race, NASCAR began an investigation over Cole Custer's last lap behavior, in which he slowed down into backstretch into the chicane (on pretext of possibility of him having flat tires, according to radio communications) in order to allow Chase Briscoe to pass several drivers; NASCAR assured that the Round of 8 grid would not change as a result of the investigation. On October 11, NASCAR docked Custer 50 driver and owner points, suspended his crew chief Mike Shiplett (who made the flat tire radio communication, instead of the spotter) indefinitely, and fined both $100,000 each, on race manipulation charges. On October 27, Stewart-Haas Racing lost the appeal against Custer's penalties.

Shiplett has since been reinstated by NASCAR on January 10, 2023.

== Media ==
=== Television ===
NBC Sports covered the race on the television side. Rick Allen, Jeff Burton, Steve Letarte and Dale Earnhardt Jr. called the race from the broadcast booth. Dave Burns, Kim Coon and Marty Snider handled the pit road duties from pit lane. Rutledge Wood served as a "CityView" reporter and share stories from the track.

NBC
| Booth announcers | Pit reporters | Cityview reporter |
|---|---|---|
| Lap-by-lap: Rick Allen; Color-commentator: Jeff Burton; Color-commentator: Steve Letarte; Color-commentator: Dale Earnhardt Jr. | Dave Burns; Kim Coon; Marty Snider | Rutledge Wood |

=== Radio ===
The Performance Racing Network had the radio call for the race, which was also simulcasted on Sirius XM NASCAR Radio. Doug Rice and Mark Garrow called the race from the booth when the field raced down the front straightaway. IMS Radio's Nick Yeoman was assigned the entrance to the road course and into the Bank of America bridge (Turns 1–3). Voice of the Indianapolis 500 Mark Jaynes was assigned the action from the Bank of America bridge to the middle of the infield section. Doug Turnbull called the action exiting in infield into the oval Turn 1 banking (Turns 7–9). Pat Patterson called the action on the backstretch and into the bus stop. Rob Albright was assigned to the oval Turn 3–4 end. (Turns 13–15). Brad Gillie, Brett McMillan, Alan Cavanna, and Wendy Venturini had the call from the pit area for PRN.

PRN
| Booth announcers | Turn announcers | Pit reporters |
|---|---|---|
| Lead announcer: Doug Rice; Announcer: Mark Garrow | Infield entrance: Nick Yeoman; Middle of Infield: Mark Jaynes; Exit of Infield: Doug Turnbull; Oval 2 to Bus Stop Pat Patterson; Oval 3/4: Rob Albright | Brad Gillie; Brett McMillan; Alan Cavanna; Wendy Venturini |

== Standings after the race ==
Drivers' Championship standings

| | Pos | Driver | Points |
|---|---|---|---|
| | 1 | Chase Elliott | 4,046 |
| 3 | 2 | Joey Logano | 4,026 (–20) |
| | 3 | Ross Chastain | 4,021 (–25) |
| 7 | 4 | Christopher Bell | 4,018 (–28) |
| 3 | 5 | Ryan Blaney | 4,015 (–31) |
| 1 | 6 | William Byron | 4,015 (–31) |
| 3 | 7 | Denny Hamlin | 4,013 (–33) |
| 1 | 8 | Chase Briscoe | 4,009 (–37) |
| 3 | 9 | Kyle Larson | 2,200 (–1,846) |
| 2 | 10 | Daniel Suárez | 2,162 (–1,884) |
| 1 | 11 | Austin Cindric | 2,154 (–1,892) |
| 1 | 12 | Tyler Reddick | 2,153 (–1,893) |
| 1 | 13 | Austin Dillon | 2,134 (–1,912) |
| 1 | 14 | Kyle Busch | 2,123 (–1,923) |
| 3 | 15 | Alex Bowman | 2,104 (–1,942) |
| | 16 | Kevin Harvick | 2,006 (–2,040) |
Official driver's standings

Manufacturers' Championship standings

| Pos | Manufacturer | Points |
|---|---|---|
| 1 | Chevrolet | 1,180 |
| 2 | Ford | 1,104 (–76) |
| 3 | Toyota | 1,053 (–127) |

- Note: Only the first 16 positions are included for the driver standings.

| Previous race: 2022 YellaWood 500 | NASCAR Cup Series; 2022 season | Next race: 2022 South Point 400 |
