= Team AmeriVet =

American stock car racing team

- Owner(s): William Auchmoody; Rebecca Auchmoody; Casey Caudill
- Base: Mooresville, North Carolina
- Series: NASCAR Cup Series
- Race drivers: 50. TBA (part-time)
- Manufacturer: Chevrolet
- Opened: 2022
- Website: teamamerivet.com

Career
- Debut: 2022 Daytona 500 (Daytona)
- Latest race: 2026 Cook Out Clash (Bowman Gray Stadium)
- Races competed: 9
- Drivers' Championships: 0
- Race victories: 0
- Pole positions: 0

Team AmeriVet, (formerly Money Team Racing or TMT), is an American professional stock car racing team that competes in the NASCAR Cup Series. They last fielded the No. 50 Chevrolet Camaro ZL1 for Burt Myers part-time.

== History ==
On October 25, 2019, motorsport journalist Adam Stern reported on Twitter that a new NASCAR team, owned by professional boxer Floyd Mayweather Jr., might debut at the final race of the 2019 season at Homestead–Miami Speedway, with plans to run full-time in 2020. However, the team did not participate in any races during the 2019 or 2020 seasons.

In 2020, Jeffrey Earnhardt attempted to race in the eNASCAR iRacing Pro Invitational Series for the team but failed to qualify. By December 2020, the team was in talks with Spire Motorsports to form a partnership for the 2021 NASCAR Cup Series, aiming to run a full-time car in 2022. However, the deal ultimately fell through. Former StarCom Racing owners William Woelehmann and brothers Matthew and Michael Kohler were later announced as investors in the team.

In May 2024, the team rebranded as Team AmeriVet under a new ownership group. It was also announced that Ty Dillon would attempt the Coca-Cola 600, with AmeriVet Securities as his sponsor.

On May 1, 2025, Casey Caudill, founder of Prime Gate Holdings, was announced as a member of Team AmeriVet's ownership group.

== Cup Series ==
=== Car No. 50 history ===
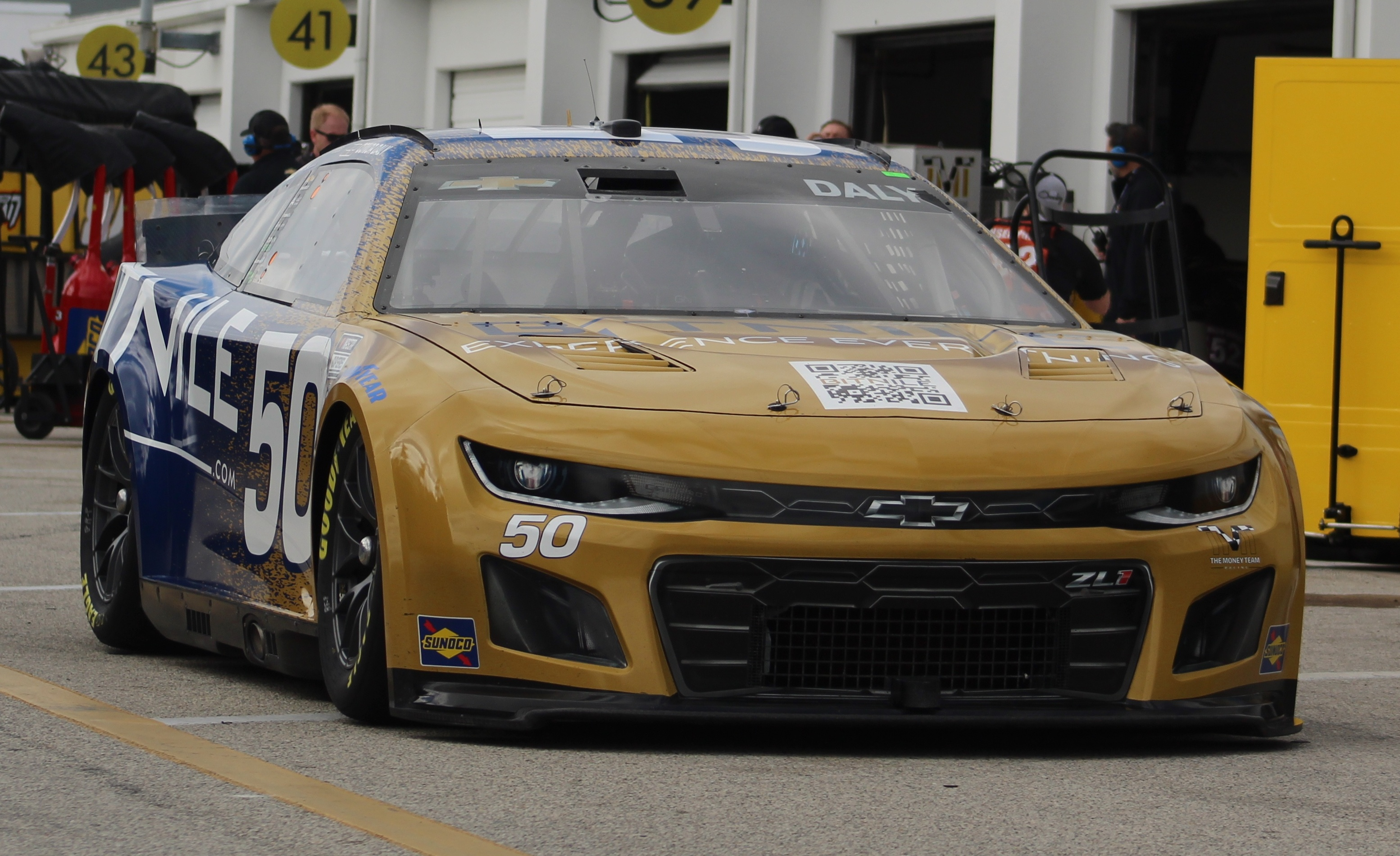
Conor Daly in the No. 50 at Daytona International Speedway in 2023

In late 2019, rumors circulated that Mayweather planned to start a new NASCAR Cup Series team under his brand, The Money Team, with intentions to compete in the 2019 Ford EcoBoost 400 and run full-time in 2020. However, the team did not participate in any races during 2019 or 2020.

In January 2022, rumors emerged that the team would make its Cup Series debut at the Daytona 500, with Kaz Grala as the driver. On February 1, the team confirmed it would attempt its debut at Daytona, fielding the No. 50 car for Grala with sponsorship from Pit Viper Sunglasses and Momento NFT. Grala secured a spot in the race through the duels and started in the Daytona 500. Despite losing his right rear wheel on lap 40, Grala finished in 26th place, which led to a four-race suspension for crew chief Tony Eury Jr.. Grala later placed 25th at Circuit of the Americas and 23rd at the Coca-Cola 600. Conor Daly made his Cup Series debut with the team at the Charlotte Roval, with sponsorship from BitNile.

In 2023, the No. 50 car, driven by Daly, qualified for the Daytona 500 by finishing seventeenth in Duel 2 of the Bluegreen Vacations Duels, despite handling issues during the qualifying race. Daly ultimately finished 29th out of 40 cars in the main event, completing 206 of the 212 total laps.

In 2024, Ty Dillon drove the No. 50 car to a 36th-place finish at Charlotte, marking the team's first race since its ownership change. Jeb Burton drove the No. 50 at the season finale in Phoenix, where he finished 38th.

On January 17, 2025, it was announced that Burt Myers will run the No. 50 at the Clash at Bowman Gray Stadium in 2025. On March 8, it was announced that Myers would drive for the team at the Martinsville spring race.

==== Car No. 50 results ====
Year	Driver	No.	Make	1	2	3	4	5	6	7	8	9	10	11	12	13	14	15	16	17	18	19	20	21	22	23	24	25	26	27	28	29	30	31	32	33	34	35	36	Owners	Pts
2022	Kaz Grala	50	Chevy	DAY; 26	CAL	LVS	PHO	ATL	COA; 25	RCH	MAR	BRD	TAL	DOV	DAR	KAN	CLT; 23	GTW	SON	NSH	ROA	ATL	NHA	POC	IRC	MCH	RCH	GLN	DAY	DAR	KAN	BRI	TEX	TAL						38th	40
2022	Conor Daly	50	Chevy																																ROV; 34	LVS	HOM	MAR	PHO	38th	40
2023	Conor Daly	50	Chevy	DAY; 29	CAL	LVS	PHO	ATL	COA; 36	RCH	BRD	MAR	TAL	DOV	KAN	DAR	CLT	GTW	SON	NSH	CSC	ATL	NHA	POC	RCH	MCH	IRC	GLN	DAY	DAR	KAN	BRI	TEX	TAL	ROV	LVS	HOM	MAR	PHO	44th	9
2024	Ty Dillon	50	Chevy	DAY	ATL	LVS	PHO	BRI	COA	RCH	MAR	TEX	TAL	DOV	KAN	DAR	CLT; 36	GTW	SON	IOW	NHA	NSH	CSC	POC	IND	RCH	MCH	DAY	DAR	ATL	GLN	BRI	KAN	TAL	ROV	LVS	HOM	MAR		46th	2
2024	Jeb Burton	50	Chevy																																				PHO; 38	46th	2
2025	Burt Myers	50	Chevy	DAY	ATL	COA	PHO	LVS	HOM	MAR; 36	DAR	BRI	TAL	TEX	KAN	CLT	NSH	MCH	MXC	POC	ATL	CSC	SON	DOV	IND	IOW	GLN	RCH	DAY	DAR	GTW	BRI	NHA	KAN	ROV	LVS	TAL	MAR	PHO	47th	1
