= 2024 Coca-Cola 600 =

NASCAR Cup Series race

Race details
- Race 14 of 36 in the 2024 NASCAR Cup Series
- Date: May 26, 2024
- Location: Charlotte Motor Speedway in Concord, North Carolina, U.S.
- Course: Permanent racing facility
- Course length: 1.5 miles (2.4 km)
- Distance: 249 laps, 373.5 mi (597.6 km)
- Scheduled distance: 400 laps, 600 mi (965.6 km)
- Average speed: 123.053 miles per hour (198.035 km/h)

Pole position
Driver	Ty Gibbs	Joe Gibbs Racing
- Time: 29.355

Most laps led
Driver	Christopher Bell	Joe Gibbs Racing
- Laps: 90

Winner
No. 20	Christopher Bell	Joe Gibbs Racing

Television in the United States
- Network: Fox
- Announcers: Mike Joy, Clint Bowyer, and Kevin Harvick
- Nielsen ratings: 1.7 (3.10 million)

Radio in the United States
- Radio: PRN
- Booth announcers: Doug Rice and Mark Garrow
- Turn announcers: Rob Albright (1 & 2) and Pat Patterson (3 & 4)

The 2024 Coca-Cola 600 was a NASCAR Cup Series race held on May 26, 2024, at Charlotte Motor Speedway in Concord, North Carolina and the 65th running of the event. Originally scheduled for 400 laps on the 1.5-mile (2.4 km) asphalt speedway, the race was shortened to 249 laps due to rain. It was the 14th race of the 2024 NASCAR Cup Series season, as well as the second of the four crown jewel races. Christopher Bell won the race, his first Coca-Cola 600 win, and his second of the season. Brad Keselowski finished second, and William Byron finished third. Tyler Reddick and Denny Hamlin rounded out the top five, and Ty Gibbs, Chase Elliott, Ross Chastain, Alex Bowman, and Josh Berry rounded out the top ten.

== Report ==
=== Background ===
Charlotte Motor Speedway, the track where the race was held.

The race was held at Charlotte Motor Speedway, located in Concord, North Carolina. The speedway complex includes a 1.5-mile (2.4 km) quad-oval track that was utilized for the race, as well as a dragstrip and a dirt track. The speedway was built in 1959 by Bruton Smith and is considered the home track for NASCAR with many race teams based in the Charlotte metropolitan area. The track is owned and operated by Speedway Motorsports Inc. (SMI) with Marcus G. Smith serving as track president.

==== Entry list ====
- (R) denotes rookie driver.
- (i) denotes driver who is ineligible for series driver points.

No.	Driver	Team	Manufacturer
1	Ross Chastain	Trackhouse Racing	Chevrolet
2	Austin Cindric	Team Penske	Ford
3	Austin Dillon	Richard Childress Racing	Chevrolet
4	Josh Berry (R)	Stewart-Haas Racing	Ford
5	Kyle Larson	Hendrick Motorsports	Chevrolet
6	Brad Keselowski	RFK Racing	Ford
7	Corey LaJoie	Spire Motorsports	Chevrolet
8	Kyle Busch	Richard Childress Racing	Chevrolet
9	Chase Elliott	Hendrick Motorsports	Chevrolet
10	Noah Gragson	Stewart-Haas Racing	Ford
11	Denny Hamlin	Joe Gibbs Racing	Toyota
12	Ryan Blaney	Team Penske	Ford
14	Chase Briscoe	Stewart-Haas Racing	Ford
15	Kaz Grala (R)	Rick Ware Racing	Ford
16	Shane van Gisbergen (i)	Kaulig Racing	Chevrolet
17	Chris Buescher	RFK Racing	Ford
19	Martin Truex Jr.	Joe Gibbs Racing	Toyota
20	Christopher Bell	Joe Gibbs Racing	Toyota
21	Harrison Burton	Wood Brothers Racing	Ford
22	Joey Logano	Team Penske	Ford
23	Bubba Wallace	23XI Racing	Toyota
24	William Byron	Hendrick Motorsports	Chevrolet
31	Daniel Hemric	Kaulig Racing	Chevrolet
34	Michael McDowell	Front Row Motorsports	Ford
38	Todd Gilliland	Front Row Motorsports	Ford
41	Ryan Preece	Stewart-Haas Racing	Ford
42	John Hunter Nemechek	Legacy Motor Club	Toyota
43	Erik Jones	Legacy Motor Club	Toyota
44	J. J. Yeley (i)	NY Racing Team	Chevrolet
45	Tyler Reddick	23XI Racing	Toyota
47	Ricky Stenhouse Jr.	JTG Daugherty Racing	Chevrolet
48	Alex Bowman	Hendrick Motorsports	Chevrolet
50	Ty Dillon (i)	Team AmeriVet	Chevrolet
51	Justin Haley	Rick Ware Racing	Ford
54	Ty Gibbs	Joe Gibbs Racing	Toyota
66	B. J. McLeod (i)	MBM Motorsports	Ford
71	Zane Smith (R)	Spire Motorsports	Chevrolet
77	Carson Hocevar (R)	Spire Motorsports	Chevrolet
84	Jimmie Johnson (i)	Legacy Motor Club	Toyota
99	Daniel Suárez	Trackhouse Racing	Chevrolet
Official entry list

== Practice ==
William Byron was the fastest in the practice session with a time of 29.782 seconds and a speed of 181.318 mph (291.803 km/h).

=== Practice results ===
Pos	No.	Driver	Team	Manufacturer	Time	Speed
1	24	William Byron	Hendrick Motorsports	Chevrolet	29.782	181.318
2	45	Tyler Reddick	23XI Racing	Toyota	29.981	180.114
3	23	Bubba Wallace	23XI Racing	Toyota	29.990	180.060
Official practice results

== Qualifying ==
Ty Gibbs scored the pole for the race with a time of 29.355 and a speed of 183.955 mph (296.047 km/h).

=== Qualifying results ===
Pos	No.	Driver	Team	Manufacturer	R1	R2
1	54	Ty Gibbs	Joe Gibbs Racing	Toyota	29.621	29.355
2	24	William Byron	Hendrick Motorsports	Chevrolet	29.813	29.415
3	20	Christopher Bell	Joe Gibbs Racing	Toyota	29.714	29.434
4	19	Martin Truex Jr.	Joe Gibbs Racing	Toyota	29.524	29.529
5	9	Chase Elliott	Hendrick Motorsports	Chevrolet	29.735	29.556
6	48	Alex Bowman	Hendrick Motorsports	Chevrolet	29.529	29.569
7	1	Ross Chastain	Trackhouse Racing	Chevrolet	29.774	29.624
8	45	Tyler Reddick	23XI Racing	Toyota	29.714	29.648
9	34	Michael McDowell	Front Row Motorsports	Ford	29.766	29.689
10	5	Kyle Larson	Hendrick Motorsports	Chevrolet	29.711	29.719
11	11	Denny Hamlin	Joe Gibbs Racing	Toyota	29.746	—
12	23	Bubba Wallace	23XI Racing	Toyota	29.861	—
13	4	Josh Berry (R)	Stewart-Haas Racing	Ford	29.749	—
14	99	Daniel Suárez	Trackhouse Racing	Chevrolet	29.872	—
15	8	Kyle Busch	Richard Childress Racing	Chevrolet	29.756	—
16	12	Ryan Blaney	Team Penske	Ford	29.912	—
17	2	Austin Cindric	Team Penske	Ford	29.831	—
18	14	Chase Briscoe	Stewart-Haas Racing	Ford	29.987	—
19	10	Noah Gragson	Stewart-Haas Racing	Ford	29.877	—
20	77	Carson Hocevar (R)	Spire Motorsports	Chevrolet	30.024	—
21	7	Corey LaJoie	Spire Motorsports	Chevrolet	29.885	—
22	51	Justin Haley	Rick Ware Racing	Ford	30.034	—
23	47	Ricky Stenhouse Jr.	JTG Daugherty Racing	Chevrolet	29.902	—
24	31	Daniel Hemric	Kaulig Racing	Chevrolet	30.042	—
25	71	Zane Smith (R)	Spire Motorsports	Chevrolet	29.928	—
26	42	John Hunter Nemechek	Legacy Motor Club	Toyota	30.058	—
27	3	Austin Dillon	Richard Childress Racing	Chevrolet	29.960	—
28	22	Joey Logano	Team Penske	Ford	30.101	—
29	84	Jimmie Johnson	Legacy Motor Club	Toyota	30.048	—
30	6	Brad Keselowski	RFK Racing	Ford	30.126	—
31	41	Ryan Preece	Stewart-Haas Racing	Ford	30.127	—
32	21	Harrison Burton	Wood Brothers Racing	Ford	30.175	—
33	15	Kaz Grala (R)	Rick Ware Racing	Ford	30.176	—
34	43	Erik Jones	Legacy Motor Club	Toyota	30.295	—
35	38	Todd Gilliland	Front Row Motorsports	Ford	30.374	—
36	16	Shane van Gisbergen (i)	Kaulig Racing	Chevrolet	30.473	—
37	66	B. J. McLeod (i)	MBM Motorsports	Ford	30.484	—
38	50	Ty Dillon (i)	Team AmeriVet	Chevrolet	30.624	—
39	17	Chris Buescher	RFK Racing	Ford	0.000	—
40	44	J. J. Yeley (i)	NY Racing Team	Chevrolet	0.000	—
Official qualifying results

== Race ==
=== Race results ===
==== Stage results ====
Stage One Laps: 100

Pos	No	Driver	Team	Manufacturer	Points
1	24	William Byron	Hendrick Motorsports	Chevrolet	10
2	54	Ty Gibbs	Joe Gibbs Racing	Toyota	9
3	48	Alex Bowman	Hendrick Motorsports	Chevrolet	8
4	20	Christopher Bell	Joe Gibbs Racing	Toyota	7
5	19	Martin Truex Jr.	Joe Gibbs Racing	Toyota	6
6	23	Bubba Wallace	23XI Racing	Toyota	5
7	12	Ryan Blaney	Team Penske	Ford	4
8	6	Brad Keselowski	RFK Racing	Ford	3
9	4	Josh Berry (R)	Stewart-Haas Racing	Ford	2
10	34	Michael McDowell	Front Row Motorsports	Ford	1
Official stage one results

Stage Two Laps: 100

Pos	No	Driver	Team	Manufacturer	Points
1	20	Christopher Bell	Joe Gibbs Racing	Toyota	10
2	24	William Byron	Hendrick Motorsports	Chevrolet	9
3	23	Bubba Wallace	23XI Racing	Toyota	8
4	11	Denny Hamlin	Joe Gibbs Racing	Toyota	7
5	6	Brad Keselowski	RFK Racing	Ford	6
6	48	Alex Bowman	Hendrick Motorsports	Chevrolet	5
7	9	Chase Elliott	Hendrick Motorsports	Chevrolet	4
8	4	Josh Berry (R)	Stewart-Haas Racing	Ford	3
9	1	Ross Chastain	Trackhouse Racing	Chevrolet	2
10	45	Tyler Reddick	23XI Racing	Toyota	1
Official stage two results

Stage Three Laps: 100

Pos	No	Driver	Team	Manufacturer	Points
1	20	Christopher Bell	Joe Gibbs Racing	Toyota	10
2	6	Brad Keselowski	RFK Racing	Ford	9
3	24	William Byron	Hendrick Motorsports	Chevrolet	8
4	45	Tyler Reddick	23XI Racing	Toyota	7
5	11	Denny Hamlin	Joe Gibbs Racing	Toyota	6
6	54	Ty Gibbs	Joe Gibbs Racing	Toyota	5
7	9	Chase Elliott	Hendrick Motorsports	Chevrolet	4
8	1	Ross Chastain	Trackhouse Racing	Chevrolet	3
9	48	Alex Bowman	Hendrick Motorsports	Chevrolet	2
10	4	Josh Berry (R)	Stewart-Haas Racing	Ford	1
Official stage three results

=== Final Stage results ===
Stage Four Laps: 100

Pos	Grid	No	Driver	Team	Manufacturer	Laps	Points
1	3	20	Christopher Bell	Joe Gibbs Racing	Toyota	249	67
2	30	6	Brad Keselowski	RFK Racing	Ford	249	53
3	2	24	William Byron	Hendrick Motorsports	Chevrolet	249	61
4	8	45	Tyler Reddick	23XI Racing	Toyota	249	41
5	11	11	Denny Hamlin	Joe Gibbs Racing	Toyota	249	45
6	1	54	Ty Gibbs	Joe Gibbs Racing	Toyota	249	45
7	5	9	Chase Elliott	Hendrick Motorsports	Chevrolet	249	38
8	7	1	Ross Chastain	Trackhouse Racing	Chevrolet	249	34
9	6	48	Alex Bowman	Hendrick Motorsports	Chevrolet	249	43
10	13	4	Josh Berry (R)	Stewart-Haas Racing	Ford	249	33
11	12	23	Bubba Wallace	23XI Racing	Toyota	249	39
12	4	19	Martin Truex Jr.	Joe Gibbs Racing	Toyota	249	31
13	10	5	Justin Allgaier (i) (Note: Justin Allgaier replaced Kyle Larson in the race. Larson was competing in the Indianapolis 500 that same day.)	Hendrick Motorsports	Chevrolet	249	0
14	28	22	Joey Logano	Team Penske	Ford	249	23
15	15	8	Kyle Busch	Richard Childress Racing	Chevrolet	249	22
16	9	34	Michael McDowell	Front Row Motorsports	Ford	249	22
17	35	38	Todd Gilliland	Front Row Motorsports	Ford	249	20
18	24	31	Daniel Hemric	Kaulig Racing	Chevrolet	249	19
19	34	43	Erik Jones	Legacy Motor Club	Toyota	249	18
20	17	2	Austin Cindric	Team Penske	Ford	249	17
21	20	77	Carson Hocevar (R)	Spire Motorsports	Chevrolet	249	16
22	22	51	Justin Haley	Rick Ware Racing	Ford	249	15
23	39	17	Chris Buescher	RFK Racing	Ford	249	14
24	14	99	Daniel Suárez	Trackhouse Racing	Chevrolet	249	13
25	18	14	Chase Briscoe	Stewart-Haas Racing	Ford	249	12
26	31	41	Ryan Preece	Stewart-Haas Racing	Ford	249	11
27	27	3	Austin Dillon	Richard Childress Racing	Chevrolet	249	10
28	36	16	Shane van Gisbergen (i)	Kaulig Racing	Chevrolet	249	0
29	29	84	Jimmie Johnson	Legacy Motor Club	Toyota	249	8
30	26	42	John Hunter Nemechek	Legacy Motor Club	Toyota	249	7
31	23	47	Ricky Stenhouse Jr.	JTG Daugherty Racing	Chevrolet	249	6
32	32	21	Harrison Burton	Wood Brothers Racing	Ford	249	5
33	25	71	Zane Smith (R)	Spire Motorsports	Chevrolet	249	4
34	33	15	Kaz Grala (R)	Rick Ware Racing	Ford	249	3
35	21	7	Corey LaJoie	Spire Motorsports	Chevrolet	249	2
36	38	50	Ty Dillon (i)	Team AmeriVet	Chevrolet	247	0
37	37	66	B. J. McLeod (i)	MBM Motorsports	Ford	241	0
38	19	10	Noah Gragson	Stewart-Haas Racing	Ford	170	1
39	16	12	Ryan Blaney	Team Penske	Ford	143	5
40	40	44	J. J. Yeley (i)	NY Racing Team	Chevrolet	114	0
Official race results

=== Race statistics ===
- Lead changes: 21 among 10 different drivers
- Cautions/Laps: 7 for 46 laps
- Red flags: 1 for weather
- Time of race: 3 hours, 2 minutes, and 7 seconds
- Average speed: 123.053 miles per hour (198.035 km/h)

== Media ==
=== Television ===
Fox Sports televised the race in the United States for the 24th consecutive year. This was the final Coca-Cola 600 aired on Fox for the foreseeable future, as the 2025 race will be aired on Prime Video. Mike Joy was the lap-by-lap announcer, while 2012 Fall Charlotte winner Clint Bowyer and two-time Coca-Cola 600 winner, Kevin Harvick were the color commentators. Jamie Little, Regan Smith and Josh Sims reported from pit lane during the race. Larry McReynolds provided insight from the Fox Sports studio in Charlotte.

Fox
Booth announcers	Pit reporters	In-race analyst
Lap-by-lap: Mike Joy; Color-commentator: Clint Bowyer; Color-commentator: Kevin Harvick	Jamie Little; Regan Smith; Josh Sims	Larry McReynolds

=== Radio ===
Radio coverage of the race was broadcast by the Performance Racing Network (PRN), and was also simulcasted on Sirius XM NASCAR Radio. Doug Rice and Mark Garrow called the race in the booth when the field raced through the quad-oval. Rob Albright called the race from a billboard in turn 2 when the field was racing through turns 1 and 2 and halfway down the backstretch. Pat Patterson called the race from a billboard outside of turn 3 when the field raced through the other half of the backstretch and through turns 3 and 4. Brad Gillie, Brett McMillan, Wendy Venturini, and Alan Cavanna were the pit reporters during the broadcast.

PRN Radio
Booth announcers	Turn announcers	Pit reporters
Lead announcer: Doug Rice; Announcer: Mark Garrow	Turns 1 & 2: Rob Albright; Turns 3 & 4: Pat Patterson	Brad Gillie; Brett McMillan; Wendy Venturini; Alan Cavanna

== Standings after the race ==
Drivers' Championship standings

	Pos	Driver	Points
2	1	Denny Hamlin	492
	2	Martin Truex Jr.	487 (–5)
2	3	Kyle Larson	486 (–6)
	4	Chase Elliott	475 (–17)
	5	William Byron	461 (–31)
	6	Tyler Reddick	437 (–55)
	7	Ty Gibbs	435 (–57)
1	8	Alex Bowman	408 (–84)
2	9	Brad Keselowski	397 (–95)
	10	Ross Chastain	392 (–100)
4	11	Christopher Bell	387 (–105)
4	12	Ryan Blaney	376 (–116)
3	13	Bubba Wallace	355 (–137)
1	14	Kyle Busch	346 (–146)
3	15	Chris Buescher	345 (–147)
2	16	Chase Briscoe	334 (–158)
Official driver's standings

Manufacturers' Championship standings

Pos	Manufacturer	Points
1	Chevrolet	511
2	Toyota	510 (–1)
3	Ford	473 (–38)

- Note: Only the first 16 positions are included for the driver standings.
- . – Driver has clinched a position in the NASCAR Cup Series playoffs.

== Notes ==
Previous race: 2024 Goodyear 400	NASCAR Cup Series; 2024 season	Next race: 2024 Enjoy Illinois 300
