= 2023 Bluegreen Vacations Duels =

NASCAR Bluegreen Vacations Duels

Race details
- Date: February 16, 2023
- Location: Daytona International Speedway; Daytona Beach, Florida
- Course: Permanent racing facility 2.5 mi (4 km)
- Distance: Race 1: 60 laps, 150 mi (240 km); Race 2: 60 laps, 150 mi (240 km)
- Avg Speed: Race 1: 187.63 miles per hour (301.96 km/h); Race 2: 151.813 miles per hour (244.319 km/h)

Race 1
- Pole position: Alex Bowman
- Most laps led: Ryan Blaney (30)
- Winner: Joey Logano

Race 2
- Pole position: Kyle Larson
- Most laps led: Kyle Busch (28)
- Winner: Aric Almirola

Television
- Network: FS1 & MRN
- Announcers: Mike Joy, Clint Bowyer, and Tony Stewart (Television); Alex Hayden, Jeff Striegle, and Rusty Wallace (Booth); Dave Moody (1 & 2), Mike Bagley (Backstretch), and Kyle Rickey (3 & 4) (Turns) (Radio)

The 2023 Bluegreen Vacations Duels was a pair of NASCAR Cup Series stock car races held on February 16, 2023, at Daytona International Speedway in Daytona Beach, Florida. Both were contested over 60 laps, they were the qualifying races for the 2023 Daytona 500.

== Report ==
=== Background ===
Daytona International Speedway, where the races were held.

Daytona International Speedway is one of six superspeedways to hold NASCAR races, the others being Michigan International Speedway, Auto Club Speedway, Indianapolis Motor Speedway, Pocono Raceway and Talladega Superspeedway. The standard track at Daytona International Speedway is a four–turn superspeedway that is 2.5-mile (4.0 km) long. The track's turns are banked at 31 degrees, while the front stretch, the location of the finish line, is banked at 18 degrees.

== Qualifying ==
Alex Bowman scored the pole for the race with a time of 49.536 and a speed of 181.686 mph (292.395 km/h).

=== Qualifying results ===
Pos	No.	Driver	Team	Manufacturer	R1	R2
1	48	Alex Bowman	Hendrick Motorsports	Chevrolet	49.717	49.536
2	5	Kyle Larson	Hendrick Motorsports	Chevrolet	49.870	49.708
3	24	William Byron	Hendrick Motorsports	Chevrolet	49.926	49.799
4	10	Aric Almirola	Stewart-Haas Racing	Ford	49.903	49.800
5	22	Joey Logano	Team Penske	Ford	49.881	49.803
6	14	Chase Briscoe	Stewart-Haas Racing	Ford	49.869	49.817
7	12	Ryan Blaney	Team Penske	Ford	49.965	49.985
8	2	Austin Cindric	Team Penske	Ford	49.927	49.996
9	21	Harrison Burton	Wood Brothers Racing	Ford	49.996	50.070
10	8	Kyle Busch	Richard Childress Racing	Chevrolet	49.920	0.000 (Note: Kyle Busch's Round 2 time was disallowed after he went below the yellow line during his qualifying run.)
11	23	Bubba Wallace	23XI Racing	Toyota	49.997	—
12	99	Daniel Suárez	Trackhouse Racing	Chevrolet	50.022	—
13	17	Chris Buescher	RFK Racing	Ford	50.031	—
14	9	Chase Elliott	Hendrick Motorsports	Chevrolet	50.033	—
15	1	Ross Chastain	Trackhouse Racing	Chevrolet	50.038	—
16	41	Ryan Preece	Stewart-Haas Racing	Ford	50.042	—
17	4	Kevin Harvick	Stewart-Haas Racing	Ford	50.088	—
18	6	Brad Keselowski	RFK Racing	Ford	50.091	—
19	54	Ty Gibbs (R)	Joe Gibbs Racing	Toyota	50.107	—
20	45	Tyler Reddick	23XI Racing	Toyota	50.108	—
21	20	Christopher Bell	Joe Gibbs Racing	Toyota	50.140	—
22	19	Martin Truex Jr.	Joe Gibbs Racing	Toyota	50.182	—
23	84	Jimmie Johnson	Legacy Motor Club	Chevrolet	50.202	—
24	34	Michael McDowell	Front Row Motorsports	Ford	50.205	—
25	67	Travis Pastrana	23XI Racing	Toyota	50.208	—
26	11	Denny Hamlin	Joe Gibbs Racing	Toyota	50.236	—
27	43	Erik Jones	Legacy Motor Club	Chevrolet	50.280	—
28	42	Noah Gragson (R)	Legacy Motor Club	Chevrolet	50.296	—
29	36	Zane Smith (i)	Front Row Motorsports	Ford	50.318	—
30	16	A. J. Allmendinger	Kaulig Racing	Chevrolet	50.332	—
31	31	Justin Haley	Kaulig Racing	Chevrolet	50.346	—
32	62	Austin Hill (i)	Beard Motorsports	Chevrolet	50.375	—
33	3	Austin Dillon	Richard Childress Racing	Chevrolet	50.473	—
34	38	Todd Gilliland	Front Row Motorsports	Ford	50.504	—
35	47	Ricky Stenhouse Jr.	JTG Daugherty Racing	Chevrolet	50.583	—
36	78	B. J. McLeod	Live Fast Motorsports	Chevrolet	50.609	—
37	51	Cody Ware	Rick Ware Racing	Ford	50.799	—
38	15	Riley Herbst (i)	Rick Ware Racing	Ford	50.891	—
39	77	Ty Dillon	Spire Motorsports	Chevrolet	51.045	—
40	7	Corey LaJoie	Spire Motorsports	Chevrolet	51.053	—
41	13	Chandler Smith (i)	Kaulig Racing	Chevrolet	51.422	—
42	50	Conor Daly (i)	The Money Team Racing	Chevrolet	0.000	—
Official qualifying results

== Duels ==
=== Duel 1 ===
==== Duel 1 results ====
Pos	Grid	No	Driver	Team	Manufacturer	Laps	Points
1	3	22	Joey Logano	Team Penske	Ford	60	10
2	11	20	Christopher Bell	Joe Gibbs Racing	Toyota	60	9
3	4	12	Ryan Blaney	Team Penske	Ford	60	8
4	7	17	Chris Buescher	RFK Racing	Ford	60	7
5	13	34	Michael McDowell	Front Row Motorsports	Ford	60	6
6	9	4	Kevin Harvick	Stewart-Haas Racing	Ford	60	5
7	6	23	Bubba Wallace	23XI Racing	Toyota	60	4
8	15	36	Zane Smith (i)	Front Row Motorsports	Ford	60	0
9	5	21	Harrison Burton	Wood Brothers Racing	Ford	60	2
10	2	24	William Byron	Hendrick Motorsports	Chevrolet	60	1
11	8	1	Ross Chastain	Trackhouse Racing	Chevrolet	60	0
12	14	43	Erik Jones	Legacy Motor Club	Chevrolet	60	0
13	17	3	Austin Dillon	Richard Childress Racing	Chevrolet	60	0
14	12	84	Jimmie Johnson	Legacy Motor Club	Chevrolet	60	0
15	16	16	A. J. Allmendinger	Kaulig Racing	Chevrolet	60	0
16	18	47	Ricky Stenhouse Jr.	JTG Daugherty Racing	Chevrolet	59	0
17	1	48	Alex Bowman	Hendrick Motorsports	Chevrolet	59	0
18	21	13	Chandler Smith (i)	Kaulig Racing	Chevrolet	59	0
19	10	54	Ty Gibbs (R)	Joe Gibbs Racing	Toyota	59	0
20	19	51	Cody Ware	Rick Ware Racing	Ford	59	0
21	20	77	Ty Dillon	Spire Motorsports	Chevrolet	59	0
Official race results

=== Duel 2 ===
==== Duel 2 results ====
Pos	Grid	No	Driver	Team	Manufacturer	Laps	Points
1	2	10	Aric Almirola	Stewart-Haas Racing	Ford	60	10
2	4	2	Austin Cindric	Team Penske	Ford	60	9
3	7	9	Chase Elliott	Hendrick Motorsports	Chevrolet	60	8
4	9	6	Brad Keselowski	RFK Racing	Ford	60	7
5	20	7	Corey LaJoie	Spire Motorsports	Chevrolet	60	6
6	1	5	Kyle Larson	Hendrick Motorsports	Chevrolet	60	5
7	17	38	Todd Gilliland	Front Row Motorsports	Ford	60	4
8	11	19	Martin Truex Jr.	Joe Gibbs Racing	Toyota	60	3
9	13	11	Denny Hamlin	Joe Gibbs Racing	Toyota	60	2
10	8	41	Ryan Preece	Stewart-Haas Racing	Ford	60	1
11	14	42	Noah Gragson (R)	Legacy Motor Club	Chevrolet	60	0
12	6	99	Daniel Suárez	Trackhouse Racing	Chevrolet	60	0
13	10	45	Tyler Reddick	23XI Racing	Toyota	60	0
14	15	31	Justin Haley	Kaulig Racing	Chevrolet	60	0
15	3	14	Chase Briscoe	Stewart-Haas Racing	Ford	60	0
16	18	78	B. J. McLeod	Live Fast Motorsports	Chevrolet	60	0
17	21	50	Conor Daly (i)	The Money Team Racing	Chevrolet	59	0
18	16	62	Austin Hill (i)	Beard Motorsports	Chevrolet	41	0
19	5	8	Kyle Busch	Richard Childress Racing	Chevrolet	40	0
20	19	15	Riley Herbst (i)	Rick Ware Racing	Ford	40	0
21	12	67	Travis Pastrana	23XI Racing	Toyota	40	0
Official race results

== Media ==
=== Television ===
FS1
Booth announcers	Pit reporters	In-race analyst
Lap-by-lap: Mike Joy; Color-commentator: Clint Bowyer; Color-commentator: Tony Stewart	Jamie Little; Regan Smith; Josh Sims	Larry McReynolds

=== Radio ===
MRN Radio
Booth announcers	Turn announcers	Pit reporters
Lead announcer: Alex Hayden; Announcer: Jeff Striegle; Announcer: Rusty Wallace	Turns 1 & 2: Dave Moody; Backstretch: Mike Bagley; Turns 3 & 4: Kyle Rickey	Steve Post; Kim Coon; Brienne Pedigo
