= 2022 Coca-Cola 600 =

NASCAR Cup Series race

Race details
- Race 14 of 36 in the 2022 NASCAR Cup Series
- Date: May 29, 2022
- Location: Charlotte Motor Speedway in Concord, North Carolina, U.S.
- Course: Permanent racing facility
- Course length: 1.5 miles (2.4 km)
- Distance: 413 laps, 619.5 mi (996.988 km)
- Scheduled distance: 400 laps, 600 mi (965.6 km)
- Average speed: 118.703 miles per hour (191.034 km/h)

Pole position
Driver	Denny Hamlin	Joe Gibbs Racing
- Time: 29.399

Most laps led
Driver	Ross Chastain	Trackhouse Racing Team
- Laps: 153

Winner
No. 11	Denny Hamlin	Joe Gibbs Racing

Television in the United States
- Network: Fox
- Announcers: Mike Joy, Clint Bowyer, and Jamie McMurray

Radio in the United States
- Radio: PRN
- Booth announcers: Doug Rice and Mark Garrow
- Turn announcers: Rob Albright (1 & 2) and Pat Patterson (3 & 4)

The 2022 Coca-Cola 600, the 63rd running of the event, was a NASCAR Cup Series race held on May 29, 2022, at Charlotte Motor Speedway in Concord, North Carolina. Contested over 413 laps – extended from 400 laps due to an overtime finish, on the 1.5-mile (2.4 km) asphalt speedway, it was the 14th race of the 2022 NASCAR Cup Series season, as well as the third of the four crown jewel races.

== Report ==
=== Background ===
Charlotte Motor Speedway, the track where the race was held.

The race was held at Charlotte Motor Speedway, located in Concord, North Carolina. The speedway complex includes a 1.5-mile (2.4 km) quad-oval track that was utilized for the race, as well as a dragstrip and a dirt track. The speedway was built in 1959 by Bruton Smith and is considered the home track for NASCAR with many race teams based in the Charlotte metropolitan area. The track is owned and operated by Speedway Motorsports Inc. (SMI) with Marcus G. Smith serving as track president.

==== Entry list ====
- (R) denotes rookie driver.
- (i) denotes driver who is ineligible for series driver points.

No.	Driver	Team	Manufacturer
1	Ross Chastain	Trackhouse Racing Team	Chevrolet
2	Austin Cindric (R)	Team Penske	Ford
3	Austin Dillon	Richard Childress Racing	Chevrolet
4	Kevin Harvick	Stewart-Haas Racing	Ford
5	Kyle Larson	Hendrick Motorsports	Chevrolet
6	Brad Keselowski	RFK Racing	Ford
7	Corey LaJoie	Spire Motorsports	Chevrolet
8	Tyler Reddick	Richard Childress Racing	Chevrolet
9	Chase Elliott	Hendrick Motorsports	Chevrolet
10	Aric Almirola	Stewart-Haas Racing	Ford
11	Denny Hamlin	Joe Gibbs Racing	Toyota
12	Ryan Blaney	Team Penske	Ford
14	Chase Briscoe	Stewart-Haas Racing	Ford
15	Ryan Preece (i)	Rick Ware Racing	Ford
16	Noah Gragson (i)	Kaulig Racing	Chevrolet
17	Chris Buescher	RFK Racing	Ford
18	Kyle Busch	Joe Gibbs Racing	Toyota
19	Martin Truex Jr.	Joe Gibbs Racing	Toyota
20	Christopher Bell	Joe Gibbs Racing	Toyota
21	Harrison Burton (R)	Wood Brothers Racing	Ford
22	Joey Logano	Team Penske	Ford
23	Bubba Wallace	23XI Racing	Toyota
24	William Byron	Hendrick Motorsports	Chevrolet
31	Justin Haley	Kaulig Racing	Chevrolet
34	Michael McDowell	Front Row Motorsports	Ford
38	Todd Gilliland (R)	Front Row Motorsports	Ford
41	Cole Custer	Stewart-Haas Racing	Ford
42	Ty Dillon	Petty GMS Motorsports	Chevrolet
43	Erik Jones	Petty GMS Motorsports	Chevrolet
45	Kurt Busch	23XI Racing	Toyota
47	Ricky Stenhouse Jr.	JTG Daugherty Racing	Chevrolet
48	Alex Bowman	Hendrick Motorsports	Chevrolet
50	Kaz Grala (i)	The Money Team Racing	Chevrolet
51	Cody Ware	Rick Ware Racing	Ford
77	Josh Bilicki (i)	Spire Motorsports	Chevrolet
78	B. J. McLeod	Live Fast Motorsports	Ford
99	Daniel Suárez	Trackhouse Racing Team	Chevrolet
Official entry list

== Practice ==
Kyle Larson was the fastest in the practice session with a time of 29.589 seconds and a speed of 182.500 mph (293.705 km/h).

=== Practice results ===
Pos	No.	Driver	Team	Manufacturer	Time	Speed
1	5	Kyle Larson	Hendrick Motorsports	Chevrolet	29.589	182.500
2	48	Alex Bowman	Hendrick Motorsports	Chevrolet	29.637	182.205
3	1	Ross Chastain	Trackhouse Racing Team	Chevrolet	29.703	181.800
Official practice results

== Qualifying ==
Denny Hamlin scored the pole for the race with a time of 29.399 and a speed of 183.680 mph (295.604 km/h).

=== Qualifying results ===
Pos	No.	Driver	Team	Manufacturer	R1	R2
1	11	Denny Hamlin	Joe Gibbs Racing	Toyota	29.577	29.399
2	45	Kurt Busch	23XI Racing	Toyota	29.459	29.402
3	20	Christopher Bell	Joe Gibbs Racing	Toyota	29.462	29.403
4	18	Kyle Busch	Joe Gibbs Racing	Toyota	29.452	29.427
5	24	William Byron	Hendrick Motorsports	Chevrolet	29.466	29.520
6	2	Austin Cindric (R)	Team Penske	Ford	29.535	29.621
7	23	Bubba Wallace	23XI Racing	Toyota	29.655	29.623
8	8	Tyler Reddick	Richard Childress Racing	Chevrolet	29.584	29.638
9	48	Alex Bowman	Hendrick Motorsports	Chevrolet	29.652	29.643
10	34	Michael McDowell	Front Row Motorsports	Ford	29.861	29.820
11	12	Ryan Blaney	Team Penske	Ford	29.617	—
12	99	Daniel Suárez	Trackhouse Racing Team	Chevrolet	29.701	—
13	9	Chase Elliott	Hendrick Motorsports	Chevrolet	29.721	—
14	19	Martin Truex Jr.	Joe Gibbs Racing	Toyota	29.725	—
15	14	Chase Briscoe	Stewart-Haas Racing	Ford	29.760	—
16	3	Austin Dillon	Richard Childress Racing	Chevrolet	29.822	—
17	21	Harrison Burton (R)	Wood Brothers Racing	Ford	29.865	—
18	4	Kevin Harvick	Stewart-Haas Racing	Ford	29.868	—
19	17	Chris Buescher	RFK Racing	Ford	29.914	—
20	31	Justin Haley	Kaulig Racing	Chevrolet	29.929	—
21	41	Cole Custer	Stewart-Haas Racing	Ford	29.929	—
22	1	Ross Chastain	Trackhouse Racing Team	Chevrolet	29.946	—
23	22	Joey Logano	Team Penske	Ford	29.994	—
24	10	Aric Almirola	Stewart-Haas Racing	Ford	30.020	—
25	43	Erik Jones	Petty GMS Motorsports	Chevrolet	30.020	—
26	15	Ryan Preece (i)	Rick Ware Racing	Ford	30.141	—
27	16	Noah Gragson (i)	Kaulig Racing	Chevrolet	30.188	—
28	42	Ty Dillon	Petty GMS Motorsports	Chevrolet	30.223	—
29	47	Ricky Stenhouse Jr.	JTG Daugherty Racing	Chevrolet	30.232	—
30	38	Todd Gilliland (R)	Front Row Motorsports	Ford	30.317	—
31	78	B. J. McLeod	Live Fast Motorsports	Ford	30.469	—
32	77	Josh Bilicki (i)	Spire Motorsports	Chevrolet	30.729	—
33	51	Cody Ware	Rick Ware Racing	Ford	30.958	—
34	50	Kaz Grala (i)	The Money Team Racing	Chevrolet	31.884	—
35	6	Brad Keselowski	RFK Racing	Ford	58.599	—
36	5	Kyle Larson	Hendrick Motorsports	Chevrolet	0.000	—
37	7	Corey LaJoie	Spire Motorsports	Chevrolet	0.000	—
Official qualifying results

== Race ==
=== Stage 1 ===
Outside pole sitter Kurt Busch took the lead from pole sitter Denny Hamlin and led the first lap. Hamlin would take the lead on lap 3 as Busch and Hamlin raced side by side with each other for the first 3 and a half laps. On lap 10, Kyle Busch took the lead from his Joe Gibbs Racing teammate. On lap 18, the first caution of the race occurred for a three car crash in turn four involving Ryan Preece, Noah Gragson, and Chris Buescher. Kyle Busch won the race from pit road and led the field to the restart on lap 23. On lap 33, the second caution flew when Josh Bilicki crashed in turn 3. The race restarted on lap 39. Bubba Wallace led lap 40 as he and Busch battled for the lead before Kyle took it back the next lap. On lap 46, Daniel Suárez began to battle Kyle Busch for the lead. On that same lap while they were battling, Busch's car got loose in the middle of turns 1 and 2 and ended up spinning out bringing out the third caution of the race. The race restarted on lap 51. On lap 61, the fourth caution flew when Corey LaJoie crashed in turn 2. Chase Elliott won the race from pit road and led the field to the restart on lap 68. Elliott would end up winning stage one as the caution flew for the stage end.

=== Stage 2 ===
Elliott won the race from pit road and led the field to the restart to begin stage 2 on lap 108. On lap 111, Ross Chastain took the lead from Elliott. On lap 126, the 6th caution flew when Bubba Wallace spun off at turn 4. During pit stops, a little fire occurred in Kyle Larson's pit. Chase Elliott won the race from pit road and led the field to the restart on lap 132. On lap 146, the 7th caution occurred when Austin Cindric blew a left rear tire and crashed in turn 3. Elliott won the race from pit road again to keep his lead. The race would restart on lap 152. On lap 165, Ryan Blaney's car slid and hit the wall in turns 1 and 2 but kept on going with no caution thrown. However, the 8th caution would be thrown on the next lap when Kyle Larson spun off at turn 4. The race restarted on lap 171. On that restart, Ross Chastain would take the lead from Chase Elliott. On lap 186, Chase Elliott was battling Daniel Suárez for second when Chase attempted to pass Suárez in turn 1, he tried to slide up in front of him but ended up sliding into the wall. About 20 seconds after that happened, Elliott blew a right rear tire and spun off at turn 4 bringing out the 9th caution of the race. The race restarted on lap 192. One lap later, the tenth caution came out when a large crash ("The Big One") occurred in turn 1. It started when Ryan Blaney hit the apron of the track and slid up into Kevin Harvick and then spun around, collecting Brad Keselowski, Denny Hamlin, Noah Gragson, Martin Truex Jr., Harrison Burton, Bubba Wallace, William Byron, Michael McDowell, Todd Gilliland, and Kurt Busch. The race would restart on lap 197 with 4 laps to go in stage 2. On that restart, Daniel Suárez would take the lead from his Trackhouse Racing teammate Ross Chastain. Suárez would end up winning stage 2. After stage 2 ended, the field turned onto pit road and stopped for a moment of silence for the ones who were lost while serving in the military for Memorial Day.

=== Stage 3 ===
Suárez won the race from pit road but Joey Logano, Martin Truex Jr., Christopher Bell, and Kyle Busch did not stop and Logano led the field back to the green to start stage 3 on lap 209. On lap 214, Daniel Suárez took the lead from Logano, on lap 220, the 12th caution flew when Kevin Harvick got loose when he tried to pass Ricky Stenhouse Jr. and hit the wall in turn 2. During the caution, Harvick went behind Stenhouse when Stenhouse appeared to brake check Harvick. Suárez went down and pitted and gave the lead to his teammate Ross Chastain. The race restarted on lap 225. On lap 252, Suarez charged his way from the back all the way to the lead. On lap 254, the 13th caution flew when Noah Gragson spun off at turn 4. Chastain won the race from pit road and lead the field to the restart on lap 259. Chase Briscoe challenged Chastain for the lead and lead lap 260 and got out in front of him before Chastain pulled a crossover move on Briscoe and took the lead back. Chastain would end up winning stage 3.

=== Final stage ===
Tyler Reddick won the race from pit road and lead the field to the green to start the final stage on lap 308. On lap 323, Ross Chastain took the lead from Reddick. On lap 340, the 15th caution would fly when Tyler Reddick's left rear tire blew and laid debris on the race track. Chastain won the race from pit road and kept his lead. The race would restart on lap 346. But on that same lap, the wildest crash of the night would occur. Coming off turn 4, Suárez attempted to get in front of Briscoe, but Briscoe bumped Suárez turning Suárez around. While Suárez was spinning, he was broadsided by Todd Gilliland and then got hit again by Buescher, who was already spinning after he got rear ended by Harrison Burton. Buescher's impact into Suárez ended up breaking the right front axle on Buescher's car completely apart with the tether still attached. Buescher did a 360 spin in the grass before the right front wheel of his car dug into the grass, causing the car to flip over four times before coming to a rest upside down on the apron turn 1 of the Roval course. The race was red-flagged for ten minutes while rescue workers uprighted Buescher's car so he could climb out. The race would get back under way on lap 353 with 48 laps to go. With 47 to go, Kyle Larson took the lead from Ross Chastain. Chase Briscoe would pass Chastain for second. Larson soon began to pull away with an almost 2 second lead. But with 31 to go, Chase Briscoe began to close the gap on Larson. With 22 to go, Briscoe was in the rear view mirror of Larson. Briscoe attempted to pass Larson with 13 to go but couldn't make it stick. Briscoe tried again with 5 to go and actually beat Larson to the line to lead that lap and tried to put a slide job on Larson but failed and Larson got by Briscoe. With 2 to go, Briscoe attempted to pass Larson on the inside again in turn 1 but he drove in the corner hard and in doing so, his car ended up getting sideways and spun around on him which also brought out the 17th caution of the race. The caution would set up overtime. Larson would win the race from pit road narrowly edging out Chastain. On the restart, Larson got ahead. Austin Dillon, who restarted 6th, got a big run and passed both Chastain and Joey Logano who were racing each other for second and Dillon attempted to pass Larson in turn 3. In turn 4, Chastain got himself a run and went to the outside of Larson and Dillon while Hamlin went to the inside of the three and made it four wide at turn 4. But coming out of turn four, Larson and Chastain made a little contact which sent Larson down and turning Austin Dillion around and into the wall in a wreck that also collected Chastain, Larson, Martin Truex Jr., Joey Logano, Cole Custer, and Ricky Stenhouse Jr. The 18th and final caution flew before the white flag was shown. Denny Hamlin was the race leader for the first time since lap 9 of the race. Chastain decided not to pit for his damaged front of his car and restarted next to Hamlin. On the 2nd overtime restart, Chastain's car did not get up to speed and ended up cutting down a tire and falling way back. Kyle Busch attempted to pass his teammate Hamlin for the lead and lead when they took the white flag but Busch could not do it and Denny Hamlin would win his first ever Coca-Cola 600 race. This would be Hamlin's 2nd win of 2022. Kyle Busch, Kevin Harvick, Chase Briscoe, and Christopher Bell rounded out the top 5 while Tyler Reddick, Ricky Stenhouse Jr., Michael McDowell, Kyle Larson, and Alex Bowman rounded out the top 10.

The 2022 Coca-Cola 600 was the longest running race in NASCAR history by distance as the race went for 619.5 miles. The race is also the fourth longest Coca-Cola 600 by time as it was 5 hours, 13 minutes, and 8 seconds long behind 2005, 1961, and 1960.

=== Stage Results ===
Stage One Laps: 100

Pos	No	Driver	Team	Manufacturer	Points
1	9	Chase Elliott	Hendrick Motorsports	Chevrolet	10
2	8	Tyler Reddick	Richard Childress Racing	Chevrolet	9
3	20	Christopher Bell	Joe Gibbs Racing	Toyota	8
4	1	Ross Chastain	Trackhouse Racing Team	Chevrolet	7
5	23	Bubba Wallace	23XI Racing	Toyota	6
6	12	Ryan Blaney	Team Penske	Ford	5
7	47	Ricky Stenhouse Jr.	JTG Daugherty Racing	Chevrolet	4
8	19	Martin Truex Jr.	Joe Gibbs Racing	Toyota	3
9	48	Alex Bowman	Hendrick Motorsports	Chevrolet	2
10	11	Denny Hamlin	Joe Gibbs Racing	Toyota	1
Official stage one results

Stage Two Laps: 100

Pos	No	Driver	Team	Manufacturer	Points
1	99	Daniel Suárez	Trackhouse Racing Team	Chevrolet	10
2	1	Ross Chastain	Trackhouse Racing Team	Chevrolet	9
3	43	Erik Jones	Petty GMS Motorsports	Chevrolet	8
4	14	Chase Briscoe	Stewart-Haas Racing	Ford	7
5	47	Ricky Stenhouse Jr.	JTG Daugherty Racing	Chevrolet	6
6	22	Joey Logano	Team Penske	Ford	5
7	4	Kevin Harvick	Stewart-Haas Racing	Ford	4
8	8	Tyler Reddick	Richard Childress Racing	Chevrolet	3
9	19	Martin Truex Jr.	Joe Gibbs Racing	Toyota	2
10	20	Christopher Bell	Joe Gibbs Racing	Toyota	1
Official stage two results

Stage Three Laps: 100

Pos	No	Driver	Team	Manufacturer	Points
1	1	Ross Chastain	Trackhouse Racing Team	Chevrolet	10
2	14	Chase Briscoe	Stewart-Haas Racing	Ford	9
3	5	Kyle Larson	Hendrick Motorsports	Chevrolet	8
4	8	Tyler Reddick	Richard Childress Racing	Chevrolet	7
5	99	Daniel Suárez	Trackhouse Racing Team	Chevrolet	6
6	22	Joey Logano	Team Penske	Ford	5
7	41	Cole Custer	Stewart-Haas Racing	Ford	4
8	17	Chris Buescher	RFK Racing	Ford	3
9	3	Austin Dillon	Richard Childress Racing	Chevrolet	2
10	11	Denny Hamlin	Joe Gibbs Racing	Toyota	1
Official stage three results

=== Final Stage Results ===
Stage Four Laps: 100

Pos	Grid	No	Driver	Team	Manufacturer	Laps	Points
1	1	11	Denny Hamlin	Joe Gibbs Racing	Toyota	413	42
2	4	18	Kyle Busch	Joe Gibbs Racing	Toyota	413	35
3	18	4	Kevin Harvick	Stewart-Haas Racing	Ford	413	38
4	15	14	Chase Briscoe	Stewart-Haas Racing	Ford	413	49
5	3	20	Christopher Bell	Joe Gibbs Racing	Toyota	413	41
6	8	8	Tyler Reddick	Richard Childress Racing	Chevrolet	413	50
7	29	47	Ricky Stenhouse Jr.	JTG Daugherty Racing	Chevrolet	413	40
8	10	34	Michael McDowell	Front Row Motorsports	Ford	413	29
9	36	5	Kyle Larson	Hendrick Motorsports	Chevrolet	413	36
10	9	48	Alex Bowman	Hendrick Motorsports	Chevrolet	413	29
11	17	21	Harrison Burton (R)	Wood Brothers Racing	Ford	413	26
12	14	19	Martin Truex Jr.	Joe Gibbs Racing	Toyota	413	30
13	28	42	Ty Dillon	Petty GMS Motorsports	Chevrolet	413	24
14	25	43	Erik Jones	Petty GMS Motorsports	Chevrolet	413	31
15	22	1	Ross Chastain	Trackhouse Racing Team	Chevrolet	413	48
16	30	38	Todd Gilliland (R)	Front Row Motorsports	Ford	413	21
17	24	10	Aric Almirola	Stewart-Haas Racing	Ford	412	20
18	33	51	Cody Ware	Rick Ware Racing	Ford	412	19
19	31	78	B. J. McLeod	Live Fast Motorsports	Ford	407	18
20	23	22	Joey Logano	Team Penske	Ford	405	27
21	21	41	Cole Custer	Stewart-Haas Racing	Ford	405	20
22	16	3	Austin Dillon	Richard Childress Racing	Chevrolet	405	17
23	34	50	Kaz Grala (i)	The Money Team Racing	Chevrolet	400	0
24	27	16	Noah Gragson (i)	Kaulig Racing	Chevrolet	386	0
25	12	99	Daniel Suárez	Trackhouse Racing Team	Chevrolet	346	28
26	19	17	Chris Buescher	RFK Racing	Ford	346	14
27	20	31	Justin Haley	Kaulig Racing	Chevrolet	343	10
28	7	23	Bubba Wallace	23XI Racing	Toyota	200	15
29	11	12	Ryan Blaney	Team Penske	Ford	195	13
30	35	6	Brad Keselowski	RFK Racing	Ford	193	7
31	2	45	Kurt Busch	23XI Racing	Toyota	191	6
32	5	24	William Byron	Hendrick Motorsports	Chevrolet	191	5
33	13	9	Chase Elliott	Hendrick Motorsports	Chevrolet	188	14
34	6	2	Austin Cindric (R)	Team Penske	Ford	145	3
35	37	7	Corey LaJoie	Spire Motorsports	Chevrolet	60	2
36	32	77	Josh Bilicki (i)	Spire Motorsports	Chevrolet	31	0
37	26	15	Ryan Preece (i)	Rick Ware Racing	Ford	16	0
Official race results

=== Race statistics ===
- Lead changes: 31 among 13 different drivers
- Cautions/Laps: 18 for 90
- Red flags: 2 for 12 minutes
- Time of race: 5 hours, 13 minutes and 8 seconds
- Average speed: 118.703 miles per hour (191.034 km/h)

== Media ==
=== Television ===
Fox Sports televised the race in the United States for the 22nd consecutive year. Mike Joy was the lap-by-lap announcer, while 2012 Fall Charlotte winner Clint Bowyer and two-time winner Jamie McMurray were the color commentators. Jamie Little, Regan Smith and Vince Welch reported from pit lane during the race. Larry McReynolds provided insight from the Fox Sports studio in Charlotte.

Fox
Booth announcers	Pit reporters	In-race analyst
Lap-by-lap: Mike Joy; Color-commentator: Clint Bowyer; Color-commentator: Jamie McMurray	Jamie Little; Regan Smith; Vince Welch	Larry McReynolds

=== Radio ===
Radio coverage of the race was broadcast by the Performance Racing Network (PRN), and was simulcasted on Sirius XM NASCAR Radio. Doug Rice and Mark Garrow called the race in the booth when the field raced through the quad-oval. Rob Albright called the race from a billboard in turn 2 when the field was racing through turns 1 and 2 and halfway down the backstretch. Pat Patterson called the race from a billboard outside of turn 3 when the field raced through the other half of the backstretch and through turns 3 and 4. Brad Gillie, Brett McMillan and Alan Cavanna were the pit reporters during the broadcast.

PRN Radio
Booth announcers	Turn announcers	Pit reporters
Lead announcer: Doug Rice; Announcer: Mark Garrow	Turns 1 & 2: Rob Albright; Turns 3 & 4: Pat Patterson	Brad Gillie; Brett McMillan; Alan Cavanna

== Standings after the race ==
Drivers' Championship standings

	Pos	Driver	Points
	1	Chase Elliott	489
3	2	Ross Chastain	455 (–34)
	3	Kyle Busch	452 (–37)
2	4	Ryan Blaney	436 (–53)
1	5	Martin Truex Jr.	430 (–59)
1	6	Joey Logano	423 (–66)
3	7	William Byron	420 (–69)
	8	Alex Bowman	415 (–74)
	9	Kyle Larson	412 (–77)
	10	Christopher Bell	400 (–89)
	11	Kevin Harvick	373 (–116)
3	12	Tyler Reddick	350 (–139)
1	13	Chase Briscoe	349 (–140)
2	14	Aric Almirola	342 (–147)
2	15	Austin Dillon	328 (–161)
1	16	Erik Jones	321 (–168)
Official driver's standings

Manufacturers' Championship standings

Pos	Manufacturer	Points
1	Chevrolet	512
2	Toyota	485 (–27)
3	Ford	466 (–46)

- Note: Only the first 16 positions are included for the driver standings.
- . – Driver has clinched a position in the NASCAR Cup Series playoffs.

Previous race: 2022 AdventHealth 400	NASCAR Cup Series; 2022 season	Next race: 2022 Enjoy Illinois 300
