= 2022 EchoPark Texas Grand Prix =

NASCAR Cup Series race

Race details
- Race 6 of 36 in the 2022 NASCAR Cup Series
- Date: March 27, 2022
- Location: Circuit of the Americas in Austin, Texas
- Course: Permanent racing facility
- Course length: 3.426 miles (5.514 km)
- Distance: 69 laps, 236.394 mi (380.686 km)
- Scheduled distance: 68 laps, 231 mi (372 km)
- Average speed: 70.253 miles per hour (113.061 km/h)

Pole position
Driver	Ryan Blaney	Team Penske
- Time: 2:12:343

Most laps led
Driver	Ross Chastain	Trackhouse Racing Team
- Laps: 31

Winner
No. 1	Ross Chastain	Trackhouse Racing Team

Television in the United States
- Network: Fox
- Announcers: Mike Joy, Clint Bowyer, and Tony Stewart
- Nielsen ratings: 2.18, 3.731 Million Viewers

Radio in the United States
- Radio: PRN
- Booth announcers: Doug Rice and Mark Garrow
- Turn announcers: Rob Albright (1), Ralph Sheheen (2 to Becketts), Mark Jaynes (Chapel to S to Senna), Nick Yeoman (Sepang Hairpin), Pat Patterson (Motodrom), and Brad Gillie (Istanbul 8 to Turn 20)

The 2022 EchoPark Texas Grand Prix was a NASCAR Cup Series race held on March 27, 2022, at Circuit of the Americas in Austin, Texas. Contested on the 3.426-mile (5.514 km) road course over 69 laps, extended from 68 laps due to an overtime finish, it was the sixth race of the 2022 NASCAR Cup Series season. Ross Chastain, of Trackhouse Racing, won the race to secure his first career NASCAR Cup Series victory, and Trackhouse' first win in NASCAR.

== Report ==
=== Background ===
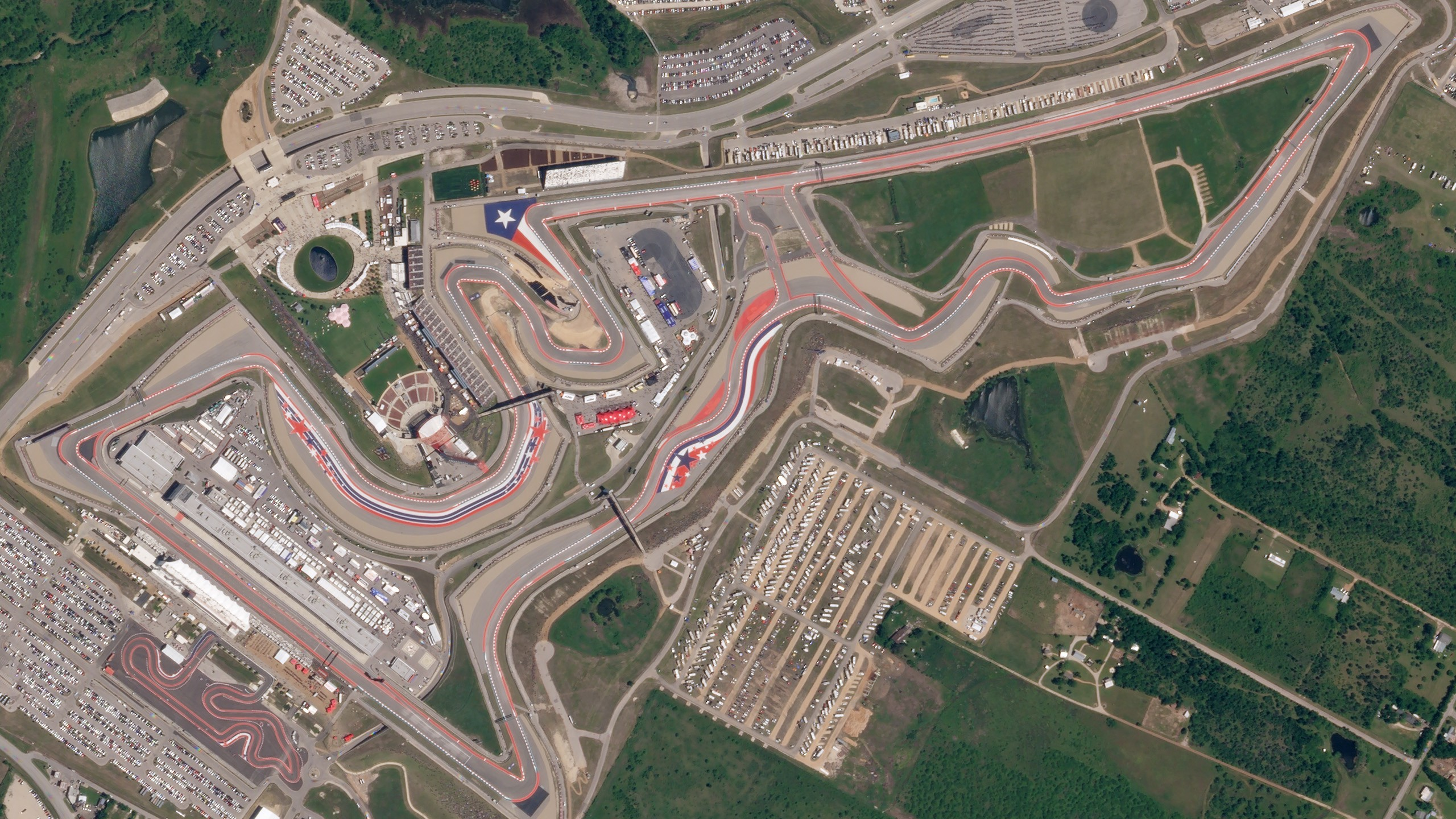
Aerial view of Circuit of the Americas, the track where the race will be held.

Circuit of the Americas (COTA) is a grade 1 FIA-specification motorsports facility located within the extraterritorial jurisdiction of Austin, Texas. It features a 3.426-mile (5.514 km) road racing circuit. The facility is home to the Formula One United States Grand Prix, and the Motorcycle Grand Prix of the Americas, a round of the FIM Road Racing World Championship. It previously hosted the Supercars Championship, the FIA World Endurance Championship, the IMSA SportsCar Championship, and IndyCar Series.

==== Entry list ====
- (R) denotes rookie driver.
- (i) denotes driver who is ineligible for series driver points.

No.	Driver	Team	Manufacturer
1	Ross Chastain	Trackhouse Racing Team	Chevrolet
2	Austin Cindric (R)	Team Penske	Ford
3	Austin Dillon	Richard Childress Racing	Chevrolet
4	Kevin Harvick	Stewart-Haas Racing	Ford
5	Kyle Larson	Hendrick Motorsports	Chevrolet
6	Brad Keselowski	RFK Racing	Ford
7	Corey LaJoie	Spire Motorsports	Chevrolet
8	Tyler Reddick	Richard Childress Racing	Chevrolet
9	Chase Elliott	Hendrick Motorsports	Chevrolet
10	Aric Almirola	Stewart-Haas Racing	Ford
11	Denny Hamlin	Joe Gibbs Racing	Toyota
12	Ryan Blaney	Team Penske	Ford
14	Chase Briscoe	Stewart-Haas Racing	Ford
15	Joey Hand	Rick Ware Racing	Ford
16	A. J. Allmendinger (i)	Kaulig Racing	Chevrolet
17	Chris Buescher	RFK Racing	Ford
18	Kyle Busch	Joe Gibbs Racing	Toyota
19	Martin Truex Jr.	Joe Gibbs Racing	Toyota
20	Christopher Bell	Joe Gibbs Racing	Toyota
21	Harrison Burton (R)	Wood Brothers Racing	Ford
22	Joey Logano	Team Penske	Ford
23	Bubba Wallace	23XI Racing	Toyota
24	William Byron	Hendrick Motorsports	Chevrolet
27	Loris Hezemans (i)	Team Hezeberg Powered by Reaume Brothers Racing	Ford
31	Justin Haley	Kaulig Racing	Chevrolet
34	Michael McDowell	Front Row Motorsports	Ford
38	Todd Gilliland (R)	Front Row Motorsports	Ford
41	Cole Custer	Stewart-Haas Racing	Ford
42	Ty Dillon	Petty GMS Motorsports	Chevrolet
43	Erik Jones	Petty GMS Motorsports	Chevrolet
45	Kurt Busch	23XI Racing	Toyota
47	Ricky Stenhouse Jr.	JTG Daugherty Racing	Chevrolet
48	Alex Bowman	Hendrick Motorsports	Chevrolet
50	Kaz Grala (i)	The Money Team Racing	Chevrolet
51	Cody Ware	Rick Ware Racing	Ford
66	Boris Said	MBM Motorsports	Ford
77	Josh Bilicki (i)	Spire Motorsports	Chevrolet
78	Andy Lally (i)	Live Fast Motorsports	Ford
99	Daniel Suárez	Trackhouse Racing Team	Chevrolet
Official entry list

== Practice ==
Kyle Busch was the fastest in the practice session with a time of 2:12.455 seconds and a speed of 92.681 mph (149.156 km/h).

=== Practice results ===
Pos	No.	Driver	Team	Manufacturer	Time	Speed
1	18	Kyle Busch	Joe Gibbs Racing	Toyota	2:12.455	92.681
2	99	Daniel Suárez	Trackhouse Racing Team	Chevrolet	2:12.567	92.602
3	48	Alex Bowman	Hendrick Motorsports	Chevrolet	2:13.632	92.557
Official practice results

== Qualifying ==
Under a 2021 rule change, the timing line in road course qualifying is not the start-finish line. Instead, the timing line for qualifying will be set at the exit of Istanbul 8. Ryan Blaney scored the pole for the race with a time of 2:12:343 and a speed of 92.759 mph (149.281 km/h).

=== Qualifying results ===
Pos	No.	Driver	Team	Manufacturer	R1	R2
1	12	Ryan Blaney	Team Penske	Ford	2:12.632	2:12.343
2	99	Daniel Suárez	Trackhouse Racing Team	Chevrolet	2:11.787	2:12.369
3	41	Cole Custer	Stewart-Haas Racing	Ford	2:11.832	2:12.471
4	8	Tyler Reddick	Richard Childress Racing	Chevrolet	2:12.276	2:12.552
5	48	Alex Bowman	Hendrick Motorsports	Chevrolet	2:12.777	2:12.656
6	22	Joey Logano	Team Penske	Ford	2:12.538	2:12.892
7	20	Christopher Bell	Joe Gibbs Racing	Toyota	2:12.410	2:12.912
8	11	Denny Hamlin	Joe Gibbs Racing	Toyota	2:12.490	2:13.051
9	31	Justin Haley	Kaulig Racing	Chevrolet	2:12.250	2:13.566
10	2	Austin Cindric (R)	Team Penske	Ford	2:11.935	2:13.940
11	45	Kurt Busch	23XI Racing	Toyota	2:12.669	—
12	9	Chase Elliott	Hendrick Motorsports	Chevrolet	2:12.698	—
13	5	Kyle Larson	Hendrick Motorsports	Chevrolet	2:12.698	—
14	14	Chase Briscoe	Stewart-Haas Racing	Ford	2:12.782	—
15	18	Kyle Busch	Joe Gibbs Racing	Toyota	2:12.790	—
16	1	Ross Chastain	Trackhouse Racing Team	Chevrolet	2:12.801	—
17	19	Martin Truex Jr.	Joe Gibbs Racing	Toyota	2:12.994	—
18	4	Kevin Harvick	Stewart-Haas Racing	Ford	2:13.164	—
19	21	Harrison Burton (R)	Wood Brothers Racing	Ford	2:13.263	—
20	16	A. J. Allmendinger (i)	Kaulig Racing	Chevrolet	2:13.297	—
21	3	Austin Dillon	Richard Childress Racing	Chevrolet	2:13.352	—
22	17	Chris Buescher	RFK Racing	Ford	2:13.356	—
23	23	Bubba Wallace	23XI Racing	Toyota	2:13.682	—
24	24	William Byron	Hendrick Motorsports	Chevrolet	2:13.922	—
25	10	Aric Almirola	Stewart-Haas Racing	Ford	2:14.137	—
26	6	Brad Keselowski	RFK Racing	Ford	2:14.149	—
27	34	Michael McDowell	Front Row Motorsports	Ford	2:14.164	—
28	47	Ricky Stenhouse Jr.	JTG Daugherty Racing	Chevrolet	2:14.255	—
29	38	Todd Gilliland (R)	Front Row Motorsports	Ford	2:14.324	—
30	43	Erik Jones	Petty GMS Motorsports	Chevrolet	2:14.411	—
31	50	Kaz Grala (i)	The Money Team Racing	Chevrolet	2:14.476	—
32	7	Corey LaJoie	Spire Motorsports	Chevrolet	2:14.492	—
33	42	Ty Dillon	Petty GMS Motorsports	Chevrolet	2:14.531	—
34	77	Josh Bilicki (i)	Spire Motorsports	Chevrolet	2:15.307	—
35	51	Cody Ware	Rick Ware Racing	Ford	2:15.584	—
36	27	Loris Hezemans (i)	Team Hezeberg Powered by Reaume Brothers Racing	Ford	2:15.660	—
37	66	Boris Said	MBM Motorsports	Ford	2:18.038	—
38	15	Joey Hand	Rick Ware Racing	Ford	0.000	—
39	78	Andy Lally (i)	Live Fast Motorsports	Ford	0.000	—
Official qualifying results

== Race ==
=== Stage Results ===
Stage One Laps: 15

Pos	No	Driver	Team	Manufacturer	Points
1	99	Daniel Suárez	Trackhouse Racing Team	Chevrolet	10
2	12	Ryan Blaney	Team Penske	Ford	9
3	48	Alex Bowman	Hendrick Motorsports	Chevrolet	8
4	22	Joey Logano	Team Penske	Ford	7
5	5	Kyle Larson	Hendrick Motorsports	Chevrolet	6
6	31	Justin Haley	Kaulig Racing	Chevrolet	5
7	9	Chase Elliott	Hendrick Motorsports	Chevrolet	4
8	14	Chase Briscoe	Stewart-Haas Racing	Ford	3
9	21	Harrison Burton (R)	Wood Brothers Racing	Ford	2
10	2	Austin Cindric (R)	Team Penske	Ford	1
Official stage one results

Stage Two Laps: 15

Pos	No	Driver	Team	Manufacturer	Points
1	11	Denny Hamlin	Joe Gibbs Racing	Toyota	10
2	18	Kyle Busch	Joe Gibbs Racing	Toyota	9
3	22	Joey Logano	Team Penske	Ford	8
4	12	Ryan Blaney	Team Penske	Ford	7
5	10	Aric Almirola	Stewart-Haas Racing	Ford	6
6	3	Austin Dillon	Richard Childress Racing	Chevrolet	5
7	21	Harrison Burton (R)	Wood Brothers Racing	Ford	4
8	1	Ross Chastain	Trackhouse Racing Team	Chevrolet	3
9	2	Austin Cindric (R)	Team Penske	Ford	2
10	23	Bubba Wallace	23XI Racing	Toyota	1
Official stage two results

=== Final Stage Results ===
Stage Three Laps: 38

Pos	Grid	No	Driver	Team	Manufacturer	Laps	Points
1	16	1	Ross Chastain	Trackhouse Racing Team	Chevrolet	69	43
2	5	48	Alex Bowman	Hendrick Motorsports	Chevrolet	69	43
3	7	20	Christopher Bell	Joe Gibbs Racing	Toyota	69	34
4	12	9	Chase Elliott	Hendrick Motorsports	Chevrolet	69	37
5	4	8	Tyler Reddick	Richard Childress Racing	Chevrolet	69	32
6	1	12	Ryan Blaney	Team Penske	Ford	69	47
7	17	19	Martin Truex Jr.	Joe Gibbs Racing	Toyota	69	30
8	10	2	Austin Cindric (R)	Team Penske	Ford	69	32
9	30	43	Erik Jones	Petty GMS Motorsports	Chevrolet	69	28
10	21	3	Austin Dillon	Richard Childress Racing	Chevrolet	69	32
11	18	4	Kevin Harvick	Stewart-Haas Racing	Ford	69	26
12	24	24	William Byron	Hendrick Motorsports	Chevrolet	69	25
13	27	34	Michael McDowell	Front Row Motorsports	Ford	69	24
14	26	6	Brad Keselowski	RFK Racing	Ford	69	23
15	9	31	Justin Haley	Kaulig Racing	Chevrolet	69	27
16	29	38	Todd Gilliland (R)	Front Row Motorsports	Ford	69	21
17	19	21	Harrison Burton (R)	Wood Brothers Racing	Ford	69	26
18	8	11	Denny Hamlin	Joe Gibbs Racing	Toyota	69	29
19	25	10	Aric Almirola	Stewart-Haas Racing	Ford	69	24
20	33	42	Ty Dillon	Petty GMS Motorsports	Chevrolet	69	17
21	22	17	Chris Buescher	RFK Racing	Ford	69	16
22	34	77	Josh Bilicki (i)	Spire Motorsports	Chevrolet	69	0
23	3	41	Cole Custer	Stewart-Haas Racing	Ford	69	14
24	2	99	Daniel Suárez	Trackhouse Racing Team	Chevrolet	69	23
25	31	50	Kaz Grala (i)	The Money Team Racing	Chevrolet	69	0
26	37	66	Boris Said	MBM Motorsports	Ford	69	11
27	35	51	Cody Ware	Rick Ware Racing	Ford	69	10
28	15	18	Kyle Busch	Joe Gibbs Racing	Toyota	69	18
29	13	5	Kyle Larson	Hendrick Motorsports	Chevrolet	69	14
30	14	14	Chase Briscoe	Stewart-Haas Racing	Ford	69	10
31	6	22	Joey Logano	Team Penske	Ford	69	21
32	11	45	Kurt Busch	23XI Racing	Toyota	69	5
33	20	16	A. J. Allmendinger (i)	Kaulig Racing	Chevrolet	68	0
34	36	27	Loris Hezemans (i)	Team Hezeberg Powered by Reaume Brothers Racing	Ford	62	0
35	38	15	Joey Hand	Rick Ware Racing	Ford	60	2
36	32	7	Corey LaJoie	Spire Motorsports	Chevrolet	57	1
37	28	47	Ricky Stenhouse Jr.	JTG Daugherty Racing	Chevrolet	52	1
38	23	23	Bubba Wallace	23XI Racing	Toyota	44	2
39	39	78	Andy Lally (i)	Live Fast Motorsports	Ford	19	0
Official race results

=== Race statistics ===
- Lead changes: 13 among 9 different drivers
- Cautions/Laps: 9 for 13
- Red flags: 0
- Time of race: 3 hours, 20 minutes and 57 seconds
- Average speed: 70.253 miles per hour (113.061 km/h)

== Media ==
=== Television ===
Fox Sports covered the race on the television side. Mike Joy, Clint Bowyer, and three-time NASCAR Cup Series champion and co-owner of Stewart-Haas Racing Tony Stewart called the race from the broadcast booth. Jamie Little and Regan Smith handled pit road for the television side, and Larry McReynolds provided insight from the Fox Sports studio in Charlotte.

Fox
Booth announcers	Pit reporters	In-race analyst
Lap-by-lap: Mike Joy; Color-commentator: Clint Bowyer; Color-commentator: Tony Stewart	Jamie Little; Regan Smith	Larry McReynolds

=== Radio ===
PRN had the radio call for the race which was simulcasted on Sirius XM NASCAR Radio.

PRN
Booth announcers	Turn announcers	Pit reporters
Lead announcer: Doug Rice; Announcer: Mark Garrow	Turn 1: Rob Albright; Turns 2 to Becketts: Ralph Sheheen; Chapel to S do Senna: Mark Jaynes; To Sepang Hairpin: Nick Yeoman; Motodrom: Pat Patterson; Istanbul 8 to Turn 20: Brad Gillie	Wendy Venturini; Alan Cavanna; Brett McMillan

== Standings after the race ==
Drivers' Championship standings

	Pos	Driver	Points
	1	Chase Elliott	208
4	2	Ryan Blaney	195 (–13)
1	3	Joey Logano	185 (–23)
5	4	Alex Bowman	183 (–25)
5	5	Ross Chastain	180 (–28)
2	6	William Byron	175 (–33)
1	7	Martin Truex Jr.	172 (–36)
1	8	Aric Almirola	168 (–40)
6	9	Chase Briscoe	166 (–42)
5	10	Tyler Reddick	158 (–50)
	11	Kyle Busch	154 (–54)
4	12	Austin Cindric	153 (–55)
8	13	Kurt Busch	153 (–55)
	14	Kevin Harvick	153 (–55)
2	15	Daniel Suárez	150 (–58)
4	16	Kyle Larson	149 (–59)
Official driver's standings

Manufacturers' Championship standings

Pos	Manufacturer	Points
1	Chevrolet	222
2	Ford	204 (–18)
3	Toyota	197 (–25

- Note: Only the first 16 positions are included for the driver standings.

Previous race: 2022 Folds of Honor QuikTrip 500	NASCAR Cup Series; 2022 season	Next race: 2022 Toyota Owners 400
