= 2025 Cook Out 400 (Martinsville) =

Race details
- Race 7 of 36 in the 2025 NASCAR Cup Series
- Date: March 30, 2025
- Location: Martinsville Speedway in Ridgeway, Virginia
- Course: Permanent racing facility
- Course length: 0.526 miles (0.847 km)
- Distance: 400 laps, 210.4 mi (338.8 km)
- Average speed: 68.17 miles per hour (109.71 km/h)

Pole position
Driver	Christopher Bell	Joe Gibbs Racing
- Time: 19.718

Most laps led
Driver	Denny Hamlin	Joe Gibbs Racing
- Laps: 274

Fastest lap
Driver	Denny Hamlin	Joe Gibbs Racing
- Time: 20.19

Winner
No. 11	Denny Hamlin	Joe Gibbs Racing

Television in the United States
- Network: FS1
- Announcers: Mike Joy, Clint Bowyer, and Kevin Harvick
- Nielsen ratings: 2.42 million

Radio in the United States
- Radio: MRN
- Booth announcers: Alex Hayden, Mike Bagley, and Todd Gordon
- Turn announcers: Dave Moody (Backstretch)

The 2025 Cook Out 400 was a NASCAR Cup Series race held on March 30, 2025, at Martinsville Speedway in Ridgeway, Virginia. Contested over 400 laps on the 0.526 mile (0.847 km) paperclip-shaped short track, it was the 7th race of the 2025 NASCAR Cup Series season.

Denny Hamlin won the race. Christopher Bell finished 2nd, and Bubba Wallace finished 3rd. Chase Elliott and Kyle Larson rounded out the top five, and Ross Chastain, Ryan Preece, Joey Logano, Chase Briscoe, and Todd Gilliland rounded out the top ten.

== Report ==
=== Background ===
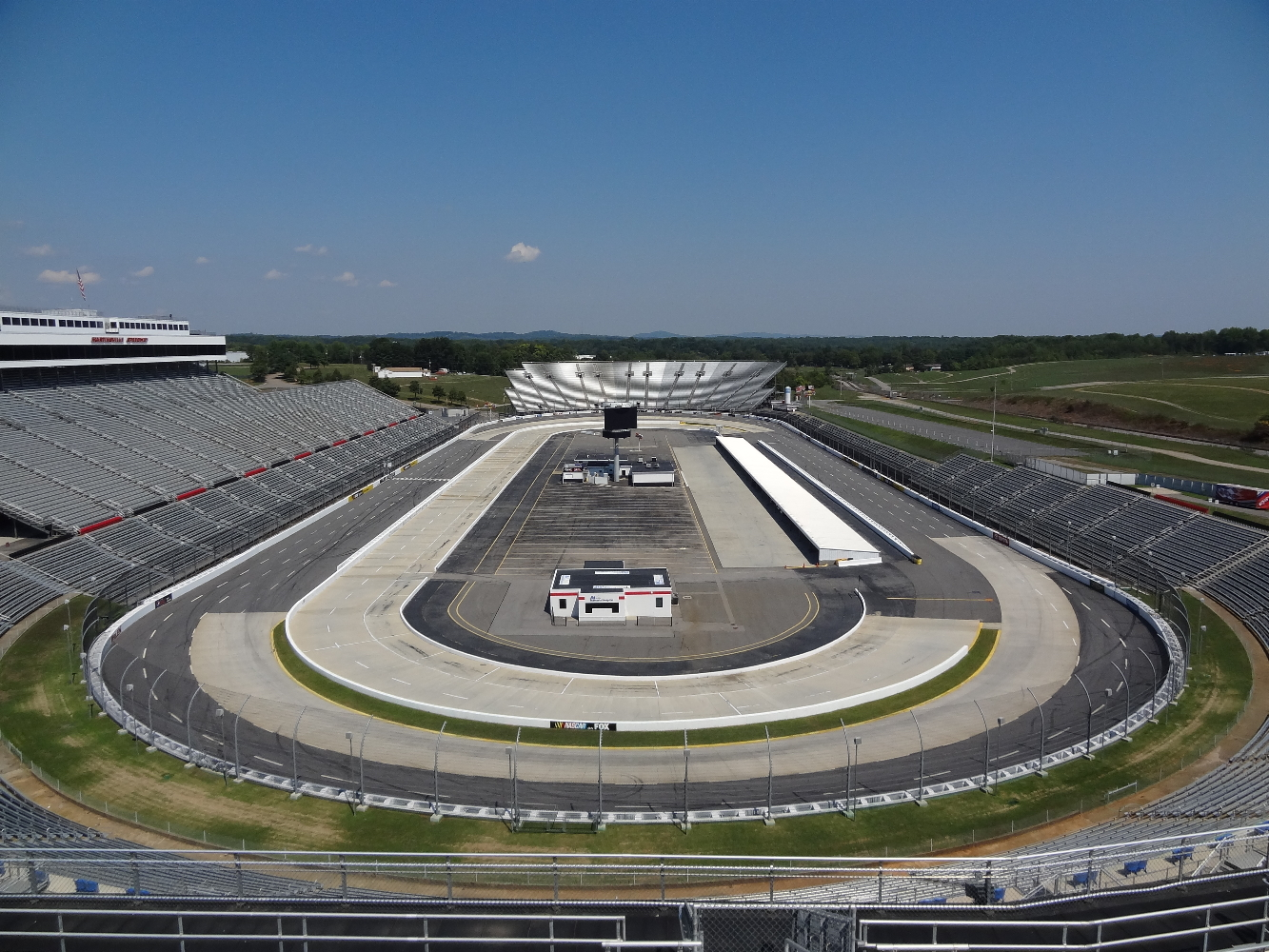
Martinsville Speedway, the track where the race was held.

Martinsville Speedway is a NASCAR-owned stock car racing track located in Henry County, in Ridgeway, Virginia, just to the south of Martinsville. At 0.526 miles (0.847 km) in length, it is the shortest track in the NASCAR Cup Series. The track was also one of the first paved oval tracks in NASCAR, being built in 1947 by H. Clay Earles. It is also the only remaining race track on the NASCAR circuit since its beginning in 1948.

==== Entry list ====
- (R) denotes rookie driver.
- (i) denotes driver who is ineligible for series driver points.

No.	Driver	Team	Manufacturer
1	Ross Chastain	Trackhouse Racing	Chevrolet
2	Austin Cindric	Team Penske	Ford
3	Austin Dillon	Richard Childress Racing	Chevrolet
4	Noah Gragson	Front Row Motorsports	Ford
5	Kyle Larson	Hendrick Motorsports	Chevrolet
6	Brad Keselowski	RFK Racing	Ford
7	Justin Haley	Spire Motorsports	Chevrolet
8	Kyle Busch	Richard Childress Racing	Chevrolet
9	Chase Elliott	Hendrick Motorsports	Chevrolet
10	Ty Dillon	Kaulig Racing	Chevrolet
11	Denny Hamlin	Joe Gibbs Racing	Toyota
12	Ryan Blaney	Team Penske	Ford
16	A. J. Allmendinger	Kaulig Racing	Chevrolet
17	Chris Buescher	RFK Racing	Ford
19	Chase Briscoe	Joe Gibbs Racing	Toyota
20	Christopher Bell	Joe Gibbs Racing	Toyota
21	Josh Berry	Wood Brothers Racing	Ford
22	Joey Logano	Team Penske	Ford
23	Bubba Wallace	23XI Racing	Toyota
24	William Byron	Hendrick Motorsports	Chevrolet
34	Todd Gilliland	Front Row Motorsports	Ford
35	Riley Herbst (R)	23XI Racing	Toyota
38	Zane Smith	Front Row Motorsports	Ford
41	Cole Custer	Haas Factory Team	Ford
42	John Hunter Nemechek	Legacy Motor Club	Toyota
43	Erik Jones	Legacy Motor Club	Toyota
45	Tyler Reddick	23XI Racing	Toyota
47	Ricky Stenhouse Jr.	Hyak Motorsports	Chevrolet
48	Alex Bowman	Hendrick Motorsports	Chevrolet
50	Burt Myers	Team AmeriVet	Chevrolet
51	Cody Ware	Rick Ware Racing	Ford
54	Ty Gibbs	Joe Gibbs Racing	Toyota
60	Ryan Preece	RFK Racing	Ford
66	Casey Mears	Garage 66	Ford
71	Michael McDowell	Spire Motorsports	Chevrolet
77	Carson Hocevar	Spire Motorsports	Chevrolet
88	Shane van Gisbergen (R)	Trackhouse Racing	Chevrolet
99	Daniel Suárez	Trackhouse Racing	Chevrolet
Official entry list

== Practice ==
Bubba Wallace was the fastest in the practice session with a time of 20.115 seconds and a speed of 94.139 mph (151.502 km/h).

=== Practice results ===
Pos	No.	Driver	Team	Manufacturer	Time	Speed
1	23	Bubba Wallace	23XI Racing	Toyota	20.115	94.139
2	20	Christopher Bell	Joe Gibbs Racing	Toyota	20.172	93.873
3	11	Denny Hamlin	Joe Gibbs Racing	Toyota	20.182	93.826
Official practice results

== Qualifying ==
Christopher Bell scored the pole for the race with a time of 19.718 and a speed of 96.034 mph (154.552 km/h).

=== Qualifying results ===
Pos	No.	Driver	Team	Manufacturer	Time	Speed
1	20	Christopher Bell	Joe Gibbs Racing	Toyota	19.718	96.034
2	9	Chase Elliott	Hendrick Motorsports	Chevrolet	19.735	95.951
3	48	Alex Bowman	Hendrick Motorsports	Chevrolet	19.738	95.937
4	5	Kyle Larson	Hendrick Motorsports	Chevrolet	19.755	95.854
5	11	Denny Hamlin	Joe Gibbs Racing	Toyota	19.758	95.840
6	17	Chris Buescher	RFK Racing	Ford	19.758	95.840
7	22	Joey Logano	Team Penske	Ford	19.762	95.820
8	23	Bubba Wallace	23XI Racing	Toyota	19.766	95.801
9	45	Tyler Reddick	23XI Racing	Toyota	19.780	95.733
10	24	William Byron	Hendrick Motorsports	Chevrolet	19.782	95.723
11	19	Chase Briscoe	Joe Gibbs Racing	Toyota	19.805	95.612
12	8	Kyle Busch	Richard Childress Racing	Chevrolet	19.811	95.583
13	54	Ty Gibbs	Joe Gibbs Racing	Toyota	19.817	95.554
14	21	Josh Berry	Wood Brothers Racing	Ford	19.819	95.545
15	71	Michael McDowell	Spire Motorsports	Chevrolet	19.833	95.477
16	42	John Hunter Nemechek	Legacy Motor Club	Toyota	19.844	95.424
17	1	Ross Chastain	Trackhouse Racing	Chevrolet	19.850	95.395
18	3	Austin Dillon	Richard Childress Racing	Chevrolet	19.858	95.357
19	38	Zane Smith	Front Row Motorsports	Ford	19.866	95.319
20	2	Austin Cindric	Team Penske	Ford	19.871	95.295
21	60	Ryan Preece	RFK Racing	Ford	19.884	95.232
22	41	Cole Custer	Haas Factory Team	Ford	19.890	95.204
23	16	A. J. Allmendinger	Kaulig Racing	Chevrolet	19.893	95.189
24	4	Noah Gragson	Front Row Motorsports	Ford	19.896	95.175
25	34	Todd Gilliland	Front Row Motorsports	Ford	19.904	95.137
26	99	Daniel Suárez	Trackhouse Racing	Chevrolet	19.919	95.065
27	6	Brad Keselowski	RFK Racing	Ford	19.945	94.941
28	10	Ty Dillon	Kaulig Racing	Chevrolet	19.976	94.794
29	77	Carson Hocevar	Spire Motorsports	Chevrolet	19.981	94.770
30	7	Justin Haley	Spire Motorsports	Chevrolet	19.991	94.723
31	43	Erik Jones	Legacy Motor Club	Toyota	19.994	94.708
32	12	Ryan Blaney	Team Penske	Ford	20.019	94.590
33	88	Shane van Gisbergen (R)	Trackhouse Racing	Chevrolet	20.090	94.256
34	47	Ricky Stenhouse Jr.	Hyak Motorsports	Chevrolet	20.109	94.167
35	35	Riley Herbst (R)	23XI Racing	Toyota	20.118	94.125
36	51	Cody Ware	Rick Ware Racing	Ford	20.268	93.428
37	66	Casey Mears	Garage 66	Ford	20.583	91.998
38	50	Burt Myers	Team AmeriVet	Chevrolet	20.613	91.864
Official qualifying results

== Race ==
=== Race results ===
==== Stage Results ====
Stage One Laps: 80

Pos	No	Driver	Team	Manufacturer	Points
1	22	Joey Logano	Team Penske	Ford	10
2	48	Alex Bowman	Hendrick Motorsports	Chevrolet	9
3	16	A. J. Allmendinger	Kaulig Racing	Chevrolet	8
4	6	Brad Keselowski	RFK Racing	Ford	7
5	42	John Hunter Nemechek	Legacy Motor Club	Toyota	6
6	60	Ryan Preece	RFK Racing	Ford	5
7	9	Chase Elliott	Hendrick Motorsports	Chevrolet	4
8	11	Denny Hamlin	Joe Gibbs Racing	Toyota	3
9	41	Cole Custer	Haas Factory Team	Ford	2
10	5	Kyle Larson	Hendrick Motorsports	Chevrolet	1
Official stage one results

Stage Two Laps: 100

Pos	No	Driver	Team	Manufacturer	Points
1	11	Denny Hamlin	Joe Gibbs Racing	Toyota	10
2	9	Chase Elliott	Hendrick Motorsports	Chevrolet	9
3	23	Bubba Wallace	23XI Racing	Toyota	8
4	54	Ty Gibbs	Joe Gibbs Racing	Toyota	7
5	19	Chase Briscoe	Joe Gibbs Racing	Toyota	6
6	12	Ryan Blaney	Team Penske	Ford	5
7	1	Ross Chastain	Trackhouse Racing	Chevrolet	4
8	20	Christopher Bell	Joe Gibbs Racing	Toyota	3
9	5	Kyle Larson	Hendrick Motorsports	Chevrolet	2
10	45	Tyler Reddick	23XI Racing	Toyota	1
Official stage two results

=== Final Stage Results ===
Stage Three Laps: 220

Pos	Grid	No	Driver	Team	Manufacturer	Laps	Points
1	5	11	Denny Hamlin	Joe Gibbs Racing	Toyota	400	54
2	1	20	Christopher Bell	Joe Gibbs Racing	Toyota	400	38
3	8	23	Bubba Wallace	23XI Racing	Toyota	400	42
4	2	9	Chase Elliott	Hendrick Motorsports	Chevrolet	400	46
5	4	5	Kyle Larson	Hendrick Motorsports	Chevrolet	400	35
6	17	1	Ross Chastain	Trackhouse Racing	Chevrolet	400	35
7	21	60	Ryan Preece	RFK Racing	Ford	400	35
8	7	22	Joey Logano	Team Penske	Ford	400	39
9	11	19	Chase Briscoe	Joe Gibbs Racing	Toyota	400	34
10	25	34	Todd Gilliland	Front Row Motorsports	Ford	400	27
11	32	12	Ryan Blaney	Team Penske	Ford	400	31
12	15	71	Michael McDowell	Spire Motorsports	Chevrolet	400	25
13	13	54	Ty Gibbs	Joe Gibbs Racing	Toyota	400	31
14	9	45	Tyler Reddick	23XI Racing	Toyota	400	24
15	28	10	Ty Dillon	Kaulig Racing	Chevrolet	400	22
16	19	38	Zane Smith	Front Row Motorsports	Ford	400	21
17	12	8	Kyle Busch	Richard Childress Racing	Chevrolet	400	20
18	18	3	Austin Dillon	Richard Childress Racing	Chevrolet	400	19
19	29	77	Carson Hocevar	Spire Motorsports	Chevrolet	400	18
20	34	47	Ricky Stenhouse Jr.	Hyak Motorsports	Chevrolet	400	17
21	26	99	Daniel Suárez	Trackhouse Racing	Chevrolet	400	16
22	10	24	William Byron	Hendrick Motorsports	Chevrolet	400	15
23	23	16	A. J. Allmendinger	Kaulig Racing	Chevrolet	399	22
24	6	17	Chris Buescher	RFK Racing	Ford	399	13
25	16	42	John Hunter Nemechek	Legacy Motor Club	Toyota	399	18
26	27	6	Brad Keselowski	RFK Racing	Ford	399	18
27	3	48	Alex Bowman	Hendrick Motorsports	Chevrolet	399	19
28	30	7	Justin Haley	Spire Motorsports	Chevrolet	398	9
29	24	4	Noah Gragson	Front Row Motorsports	Ford	397	8
30	36	51	Cody Ware	Rick Ware Racing	Ford	396	7
31	35	35	Riley Herbst (R)	23XI Racing	Toyota	396	6
32	14	21	Josh Berry	Wood Brothers Racing	Ford	396	5
33	22	41	Cole Custer	Haas Factory Team	Ford	394	6
34	33	88	Shane van Gisbergen (R)	Trackhouse Racing	Chevrolet	394	3
35	37	66	Casey Mears	Garage 66	Ford	389	2
36	38	50	Burt Myers	Team AmeriVet	Chevrolet	388	1
37	20	2	Austin Cindric	Team Penske	Ford	363	1
DSQ	31	43	Erik Jones	Legacy Motor Club	Toyota	399	1
Official race results

=== Race statistics ===
- Lead changes: 9 among 6 different drivers
- Cautions/Laps: 10 for 86
- Red flags: 0
- Time of race: 3 hours, 5 minutes and 11 seconds
- Average speed: 68.17 miles per hour (109.71 km/h)

== Media ==
=== Television ===
Fox Sports covered their 25th race at the Martinsville Speedway. Mike Joy, 2018 Spring Martinsville winner Clint Bowyer, and 2011 Spring Martinsville winner Kevin Harvick called the race from the broadcast booth. Jamie Little and Regan Smith handled pit road for the television side, and Larry McReynolds provided insight on-site during the race.

FS1
Booth announcers	Pit reporters	In-race analyst
Lap-by-lap: Mike Joy; Color-commentator: Clint Bowyer; Color-commentator: Kevin Harvick	Jamie Little; Regan Smith	Larry McReynolds

=== Radio ===
MRN had the radio call for the race which was also simulcasted on Sirius XM NASCAR Radio. Alex Hayden, Mike Bagley, and former championship winning crew chief Todd Gordon called the race in the booth when the field raced down the frontstretch. Dave Moody called the race from a platform inside the backstretch when the field raced down the backstretch. Lead MRN Pit reporter Steve Post, Chris Wilner, and Glenn Jarrett worked the pit road for the radio side.

MRN
Booth announcers	Turn announcers	Pit reporters
Lead announcer: Alex Hayden; Announcer: Mike Bagley; Announcer: Todd Gordon	Backstretch: Dave Moody	Steve Post; Chris Wilner; Glenn Jarrett

== Standings after the race ==
Drivers' Championship standings

	Pos	Driver	Points
	1	William Byron	259
	2	Kyle Larson	243 (–16)
3	3	Chase Elliott	227 (–32)
1	4	Christopher Bell	224 (–35)
2	5	Alex Bowman	224 (–35)
2	6	Denny Hamlin	218 (–41)
3	7	Tyler Reddick	213 (–46)
1	8	Bubba Wallace	208 (–51)
2	9	Joey Logano	199 (–60)
	10	Ryan Blaney	193 (–66)
2	11	Chris Buescher	177 (–82)
1	12	Chase Briscoe	169 (–90)
1	13	Ross Chastain	169 (–90)
2	14	Ryan Preece	165 (–94)
	15	Michael McDowell	159 (–100)
1	16	Kyle Busch	150 (–109)
Official driver's standings

Manufacturers' Championship standings

	Pos	Manufacturer	Points
1	1	Toyota	254
1	2	Chevrolet	252 (–2)
	3	Ford	227 (–27)

- Note: Only the first 16 positions are included for the driver standings.

Previous race: 2025 Straight Talk Wireless 400	NASCAR Cup Series; 2025 season	Next race: 2025 Goodyear 400
