= 2024 NASCAR Cup Series Championship Race =

Race details
- Race 36 of 36 in the 2024 NASCAR Cup Series
- 2024 program, featuring 2023 champion Ryan Blaney.
- Date: November 10, 2024
- Location: Phoenix Raceway in Avondale, Arizona
- Course: Permanent racing facility
- Course length: 1 miles (1.6 km)
- Distance: 312 laps, 312 mi (499.2 km)
- Weather: Sunny with a temperature around 80 °F (27 °C); wind out of the northwest at around 1 mile per hour (1.6 km/h).
- Average speed: 106.203 miles per hour (170.917 km/h)

Pole position
Driver	Martin Truex Jr.	Joe Gibbs Racing
- Time: 26.618

Most laps led
Driver	Christopher Bell	Joe Gibbs Racing
- Laps: 143

Winner
No. 22	Joey Logano	Team Penske

Television in the United States
- Network: NBC
- Announcers: Leigh Diffey, Jeff Burton and Steve Letarte
- Nielsen ratings: 1.60 (2.895 million)

Radio in the United States
- Radio: MRN
- Booth announcers: Alex Hayden, Jeff Striegle and Todd Gordon
- Turn announcers: Mike Bagley (1 & 2) and Tim Catalfamo (3 & 4)

The 2024 NASCAR Cup Series Championship Race was a NASCAR Cup Series race held on November 10, 2024, at Phoenix Raceway in Avondale, Arizona. Contested over 312 laps on the one mile (1.6 km) oval, it is the 36th and final race of the 2024 NASCAR Cup Series season and its the first Cup Series race following the death of Bobby Allison. Joey Logano won the race, clinching his third career Championship. Ryan Blaney finished 2nd, and William Byron finished 3rd. Kyle Larson and Christopher Bell rounded out the top five, and Tyler Reddick, Bubba Wallace, Chase Elliott, Chris Buescher, and Daniel Suárez rounded out the top ten.

The race was notably interrupted when the pace car crashed while trying to get off the track for a restart on lap 69 to begin the second stage. The driver of the car swerved to make the turn onto pit road at the last second, and the abrupt turn spun the car to the left into a brief slide towards the protective sand barrels at the end of the pit wall. The impact moved several barrels and scattered sand across the apron. The red flag was brought out for several minutes while the barrels were fixed and the track was cleaned, and the race resumed as normal soon after.

This was the final race for Stewart–Haas Racing, as the team folded before the 2025 season onwards. This was also the final race for 2017 champion Martin Truex Jr. as a full-time driver, as he announced his retirement from full-time racing on June 14, 2024.

== Report ==
=== Background ===
Phoenix Raceway, the track where the race was held.

Phoenix Raceway – also known as PIR – is a one-mile, low-banked tri-oval race track located in Avondale, Arizona. It is named after the nearby metropolitan area of Phoenix. The motorsport track opened in 1964 and currently hosts two NASCAR race weekends annually. PIR has also hosted the IndyCar Series, CART, USAC and the Rolex Sports Car Series. The raceway is currently owned and operated by International Speedway Corporation.

The raceway was originally constructed with a 2.5 mi (4.0 km) road course that ran both inside and outside of the main tri-oval. In 1991 the track was reconfigured with the current 1.51 mi (2.43 km) interior layout. PIR has an estimated grandstand seating capacity of around 67,000. Lights were installed around the track in 2004 following the addition of a second annual NASCAR race weekend.

==== Championship drivers ====
- Joey Logano was the first of four drivers to clinch a spot in the Championship 4, winning the first race of the Round of 8 at Las Vegas.
- Tyler Reddick clinched the second spot in the Championship 4, winning the second race of the Round of 8 at Homestead.
- Ryan Blaney clinched the third spot in the Championship 4, winning the final race of the Round of 8 at Martinsville.
- William Byron clinched the final spot in the Championship 4, though only after original championship driver Christopher Bell was penalized in the preceding Xfinity 500 after making an illegal maneuver. As such, Byron inherited his place based on points.

==== Entry list ====
- (R) denotes rookie driver.
- (i) denotes driver who is ineligible for series driver points.
- (CC) denotes championship contender.

No.	Driver	Team	Manufacturer
1	Ross Chastain	Trackhouse Racing	Chevrolet
2	Austin Cindric	Team Penske	Ford
3	Austin Dillon	Richard Childress Racing	Chevrolet
4	Josh Berry (R)	Stewart-Haas Racing	Ford
5	Kyle Larson	Hendrick Motorsports	Chevrolet
6	Brad Keselowski	RFK Racing	Ford
7	Justin Haley	Spire Motorsports	Chevrolet
8	Kyle Busch	Richard Childress Racing	Chevrolet
9	Chase Elliott	Hendrick Motorsports	Chevrolet
10	Noah Gragson	Stewart-Haas Racing	Ford
11	Denny Hamlin	Joe Gibbs Racing	Toyota
12	Ryan Blaney (CC)	Team Penske	Ford
14	Chase Briscoe	Stewart-Haas Racing	Ford
15	Kaz Grala (R)	Rick Ware Racing	Ford
16	Derek Kraus	Kaulig Racing	Chevrolet
17	Chris Buescher	RFK Racing	Ford
19	Martin Truex Jr.	Joe Gibbs Racing	Toyota
20	Christopher Bell	Joe Gibbs Racing	Toyota
21	Harrison Burton	Wood Brothers Racing	Ford
22	Joey Logano (CC)	Team Penske	Ford
23	Bubba Wallace	23XI Racing	Toyota
24	William Byron (CC)	Hendrick Motorsports	Chevrolet
31	Daniel Hemric	Kaulig Racing	Chevrolet
34	Michael McDowell	Front Row Motorsports	Ford
38	Todd Gilliland	Front Row Motorsports	Ford
41	Ryan Preece	Stewart-Haas Racing	Ford
42	John Hunter Nemechek	Legacy Motor Club	Toyota
43	Erik Jones	Legacy Motor Club	Toyota
44	J. J. Yeley (i)	NY Racing Team	Chevrolet
45	Tyler Reddick (CC)	23XI Racing	Toyota
47	Ricky Stenhouse Jr.	JTG Daugherty Racing	Chevrolet
48	Alex Bowman	Hendrick Motorsports	Chevrolet
50	Jeb Burton (i)	Team AmeriVet	Chevrolet
51	Corey LaJoie	Rick Ware Racing	Ford
54	Ty Gibbs	Joe Gibbs Racing	Toyota
66	Chad Finchum (i)	Power Source	Ford
71	Zane Smith (R)	Spire Motorsports	Chevrolet
77	Carson Hocevar (R)	Spire Motorsports	Chevrolet
84	Jimmie Johnson	Legacy Motor Club	Toyota
99	Daniel Suárez	Trackhouse Racing	Chevrolet
Official entry list

== Practice ==
Ryan Blaney was the fastest in the practice session with a time of 27.174 seconds and a speed of 132.480 mph (213.206 km/h).

=== Practice results ===
Pos	No.	Driver	Team	Manufacturer	Time	Speed
1	12	Ryan Blaney (CC)	Team Penske	Toyota	27.174	132.480
2	19	Martin Truex Jr.	Joe Gibbs Racing	Toyota	27.205	132.324
3	5	Kyle Larson	Hendrick Motorsports	Chevrolet	27.233	132.193
Official practice results

== Qualifying ==
Martin Truex Jr. scored the pole for the race with a time of 26.618 and a speed of 134.741 mph (216.845 km/h).

=== Qualifying results ===
Pos	No.	Driver	Team	Manufacturer	R1	R2
1	19	Martin Truex Jr.	Joe Gibbs Racing	Toyota	26.578	26.618
2	22	Joey Logano (CC)	Team Penske	Ford	26.509	26.728
3	1	Ross Chastain	Trackhouse Racing	Chevrolet	26.720	26.812
4	5	Kyle Larson	Hendrick Motorsports	Chevrolet	26.707	26.804
5	9	Chase Elliott	Hendrick Motorsports	Chevrolet	26.641	26.820
6	54	Ty Gibbs	Joe Gibbs Racing	Toyota	26.709	26.811
7	20	Christopher Bell	Joe Gibbs Racing	Toyota	26.729	26.992
8	24	William Byron (CC)	Hendrick Motorsports	Chevrolet	26.494	26.822
9	21	Harrison Burton	Wood Brothers Racing	Ford	26.737	27.234
10	45	Tyler Reddick (CC)	23XI Racing	Toyota	26.737	26.842
11	2	Austin Cindric	Team Penske	Ford	26.748	—
12	14	Chase Briscoe	Stewart–Haas Racing	Ford	26.739	—
13	7	Justin Haley	Spire Motorsports	Chevrolet	26.755	—
14	11	Denny Hamlin	Joe Gibbs Racing	Toyota	26.745	—
15	77	Carson Hocevar (R)	Spire Motorsports	Chevrolet	26.788	—
16	48	Alex Bowman	Hendrick Motorsports	Chevrolet	26.790	—
17	12	Ryan Blaney (CC)	Team Penske	Ford	26.813	—
18	42	John Hunter Nemechek	Legacy Motor Club	Toyota	26.850	—
19	43	Erik Jones	Legacy Motor Club	Toyota	26.899	—
20	51	Corey LaJoie	Rick Ware Racing	Ford	26.852	—
21	10	Noah Gragson	Stewart–Haas Racing	Ford	26.928	—
22	31	Daniel Hemric	Kaulig Racing	Chevrolet	26.884	—
23	84	Jimmie Johnson	Legacy Motor Club	Toyota	26.960	—
24	17	Chris Buescher	RFK Racing	Ford	26.918	—
25	8	Kyle Busch	Richard Childress Racing	Chevrolet	26.968	—
26	16	Derek Kraus	Kaulig Racing	Chevrolet	26.945	—
27	6	Brad Keselowski	RFK Racing	Ford	27.029	—
28	71	Zane Smith (R)	Spire Motorsports	Chevrolet	26.960	—
29	23	Bubba Wallace	23XI Racing	Toyota	27.131	—
30	47	Ricky Stenhouse Jr.	JTG Daugherty Racing	Chevrolet	27.035	—
31	15	Kaz Grala	Rick Ware Racing	Ford	27.152	—
32	38	Todd Gilliland	Front Row Motorsports	Ford	27.221	—
33	41	Ryan Preece	Stewart–Haas Racing	Ford	27.164	—
34	99	Daniel Suárez	Trackhouse Racing	Chevrolet	27.313	—
35	34	Michael McDowell	Front Row Motorsports	Ford	27.255	—
36	3	Austin Dillon	Richard Childress Racing	Chevrolet	27.568	—
37	44	J. J. Yeley (i)	NY Racing Team	Chevrolet	27.772	—
38	66	Chad Finchum (i)	Power Source	Ford	28.148	—
39	4	Josh Berry (R)	Stewart–Haas Racing	Ford	0.000	—
40	50	Jeb Burton (i)	Team AmeriVet	Chevrolet	0.000	—
Official qualifying results

== Race ==
- Note: Ryan Blaney, Tyler Reddick, Joey Logano, and William Byron were not eligible for stage points because of their participation in the Championship 4.

=== Race results ===
==== Stage results ====
Stage One Laps: 60

Pos	No	Driver	Team	Manufacturer	Points
1	22	Joey Logano (CC)	Team Penske	Ford	0
2	19	Martin Truex Jr.	Joe Gibbs Racing	Toyota	9
3	20	Christopher Bell	Joe Gibbs Racing	Toyota	8
4	24	William Byron (CC)	Hendrick Motorsports	Chevrolet	0
5	9	Chase Elliott	Hendrick Motorsports	Chevrolet	6
6	12	Ryan Blaney (CC)	Team Penske	Ford	0
7	45	Tyler Reddick (CC)	23XI Racing	Toyota	0
8	11	Denny Hamlin	Joe Gibbs Racing	Toyota	3
9	5	Kyle Larson	Hendrick Motorsports	Chevrolet	2
10	2	Austin Cindric	Team Penske	Ford	1
Official stage one results

Stage Two Laps: 125

Pos	No	Driver	Team	Manufacturer	Points
1	12	Ryan Blaney (CC)	Team Penske	Ford	0
2	20	Christopher Bell	Joe Gibbs Racing	Toyota	9
3	22	Joey Logano (CC)	Team Penske	Ford	0
4	24	William Byron (CC)	Hendrick Motorsports	Chevrolet	0
5	11	Denny Hamlin	Joe Gibbs Racing	Toyota	6
6	17	Chris Buescher	RFK Racing	Ford	5
7	5	Kyle Larson	Hendrick Motorsports	Chevrolet	4
8	9	Chase Elliott	Hendrick Motorsports	Chevrolet	3
9	19	Martin Truex Jr.	Joe Gibbs Racing	Toyota	2
10	45	Tyler Reddick (CC)	23XI Racing	Toyota	0
Official stage two results

=== Final Stage results ===
Stage Three Laps: 127

Pos	Grid	No	Driver	Team	Manufacturer	Laps	Points
1	2	22	Joey Logano (CC)	Team Penske	Ford	312	40
2	17	12	Ryan Blaney (CC)	Team Penske	Ford	312	35
3	8	24	William Byron (CC)	Hendrick Motorsports	Chevrolet	312	34
4	4	5	Kyle Larson	Hendrick Motorsports	Chevrolet	312	39
5	7	20	Christopher Bell	Joe Gibbs Racing	Toyota	312	49
6	10	45	Tyler Reddick (CC)	23XI Racing	Toyota	312	31
7	29	23	Bubba Wallace	23XI Racing	Toyota	312	30
8	5	9	Chase Elliott	Hendrick Motorsports	Chevrolet	312	38
9	24	17	Chris Buescher	RFK Racing	Ford	312	33
10	34	99	Daniel Suárez	Trackhouse Racing	Chevrolet	312	27
11	14	11	Denny Hamlin	Joe Gibbs Racing	Toyota	312	35
12	21	10	Noah Gragson	Stewart-Haas Racing	Ford	312	25
13	11	2	Austin Cindric	Team Penske	Ford	312	25
14	16	48	Alex Bowman	Hendrick Motorsports	Chevrolet	312	23
15	27	6	Brad Keselowski	RFK Racing	Ford	312	22
16	9	21	Harrison Burton	Wood Brothers Racing	Ford	312	21
17	1	19	Martin Truex Jr.	Joe Gibbs Racing	Toyota	312	31
18	15	77	Carson Hocevar (R)	Spire Motorsports	Chevrolet	312	19
19	3	1	Ross Chastain	Trackhouse Racing	Chevrolet	312	18
20	32	38	Todd Gilliland	Front Row Motorsports	Ford	311	17
21	25	8	Kyle Busch	Richard Childress Racing	Chevrolet	311	16
22	19	43	Erik Jones	Legacy Motor Club	Toyota	311	15
23	22	31	Daniel Hemric	Kaulig Racing	Chevrolet	311	14
24	39	4	Josh Berry (R)	Stewart-Haas Racing	Ford	311	13
25	26	16	Derek Kraus	Kaulig Racing	Chevrolet	311	12
26	23	84	Jimmie Johnson	Legacy Motor Club	Toyota	310	11
27	36	3	Austin Dillon	Richard Childress Racing	Chevrolet	310	10
28	13	7	Justin Haley	Spire Motorsports	Chevrolet	310	9
29	12	14	Chase Briscoe	Stewart-Haas Racing	Ford	310	8
30	18	42	John Hunter Nemechek	Legacy Motor Club	Toyota	310	7
31	35	34	Michael McDowell	Front Row Motorsports	Ford	309	6
32	20	51	Corey LaJoie	Rick Ware Racing	Ford	309	5
33	30	47	Ricky Stenhouse Jr.	JTG Daugherty Racing	Chevrolet	309	4
34	31	15	Kaz Grala (R)	Rick Ware Racing	Ford	308	3
35	37	44	J. J. Yeley (i)	NY Racing Team	Chevrolet	306	0
36	38	66	Chad Finchum (i)	Power Source	Ford	302	0
37	33	41	Ryan Preece	Stewart-Haas Racing	Ford	302	1
38	40	50	Jeb Burton (i)	Team AmeriVet	Chevrolet	294	0
39	28	71	Zane Smith (R)	Spire Motorsports	Chevrolet	247	1
40	6	54	Ty Gibbs	Joe Gibbs Racing	Toyota	1	1
Official race results

=== Race statistics ===
- Lead changes: 16 among 8 different drivers
- Cautions/Laps: 4 for 33
- Red flags: 1 for 5 minutes, and 47 seconds
- Time of race: 2 hours, 56 minutes, and 16 seconds
- Average speed: 106.203 miles per hour (170.917 km/h)

== Media ==
=== Television ===
NBC covered the race on the television side. Leigh Diffey, two–time Phoenix winner Jeff Burton, and Steve Letarte called the race from the broadcast booth. Dave Burns, Kim Coon, Parker Kligerman, and Marty Snider handled the pit road duties from pit lane.

NBC
Booth announcers	Pit reporters
Lap-by-lap: Leigh Diffey; Color-commentator: Jeff Burton; Color-commentator: Steve Letarte	Dave Burns; Kim Coon; Parker Kligerman; Marty Snider

=== Radio ===
The race was broadcast on radio by the Motor Racing Network and simulcast on Sirius XM NASCAR Radio. Alex Hayden, Jeff Striegle and Todd Gordon called the action from the broadcast booth when the field races down the front straightaway. This race was the final event for Jeff Striegle, who was retiring after a 28 year career with the network. Mike Bagley called the action from turns 1 & 2 and Tim Catalfamo called the action from turns 3 & 4. Pit Lane for MRN Radio was covered by MRN Lead Pit Reporter Steve Post, Dillon Welch, Jacklyn Drake and Chris Wilner.

MRN Radio
Booth announcers	Turn announcers	Pit reporters
Lead announcer: Alex Hayden; Announcer: Jeff Striegle; Announcer: Todd Gordon	Turns 1 & 2: Mike Bagley; Turns 3 & 4: Tim Catalfamo	Steve Post; Dillon Welch; Jacklyn Drake; Chris Wilner

== Standings after the race ==
Drivers' Championship standings

	Pos	Driver	Points
1	1	Joey Logano	5,040
1	2	Ryan Blaney	5,035 (–5)
1	3	William Byron	5,034 (–6)
1	4	Tyler Reddick	5,031 (–9)
	5	Christopher Bell	2,412 (–2,628)
	6	Kyle Larson	2,378 (–2,662)
	7	Chase Elliott	2,342 (–2,698)
1	8	Denny Hamlin	2,328 (–2,712)
1	9	Alex Bowman	2,318 (–2,722)
	10	Martin Truex Jr.	2,257 (–2,783)
	11	Austin Cindric	2,247 (–2,793)
	12	Daniel Suárez	2,226 (–2,814)
	13	Brad Keselowski	2,208 (–2,832)
	14	Chase Briscoe	2,184 (–2,856)
	15	Ty Gibbs	2,169 (–2,871)
	16	Harrison Burton	2,122 (–2,918)
Official driver's standings

Manufacturers' Championship standings

Pos	Manufacturer	Points
1	Chevrolet	1,309
2	Ford	1,275 (–34)
3	Toyota	1,259 (–50)

- Note: Only the first 16 positions are included for the driver standings.

Previous race: 2024 Xfinity 500	NASCAR Cup Series; 2024 season	Next race: 2025 Daytona 500
