= 2022 NASCAR Cup Series =

American motorsport season

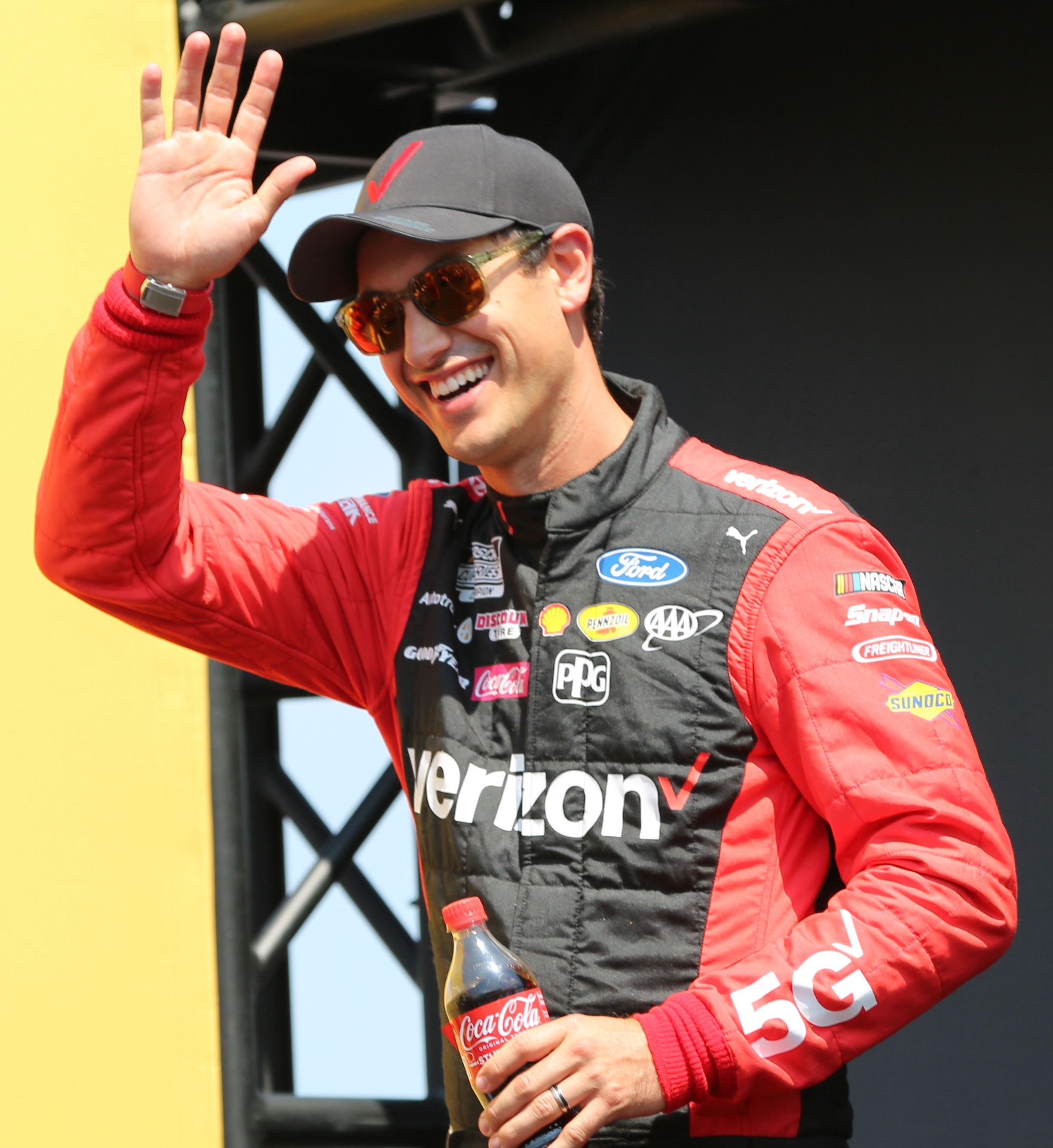
Joey Logano, the 2022 NASCAR Cup Series champion.

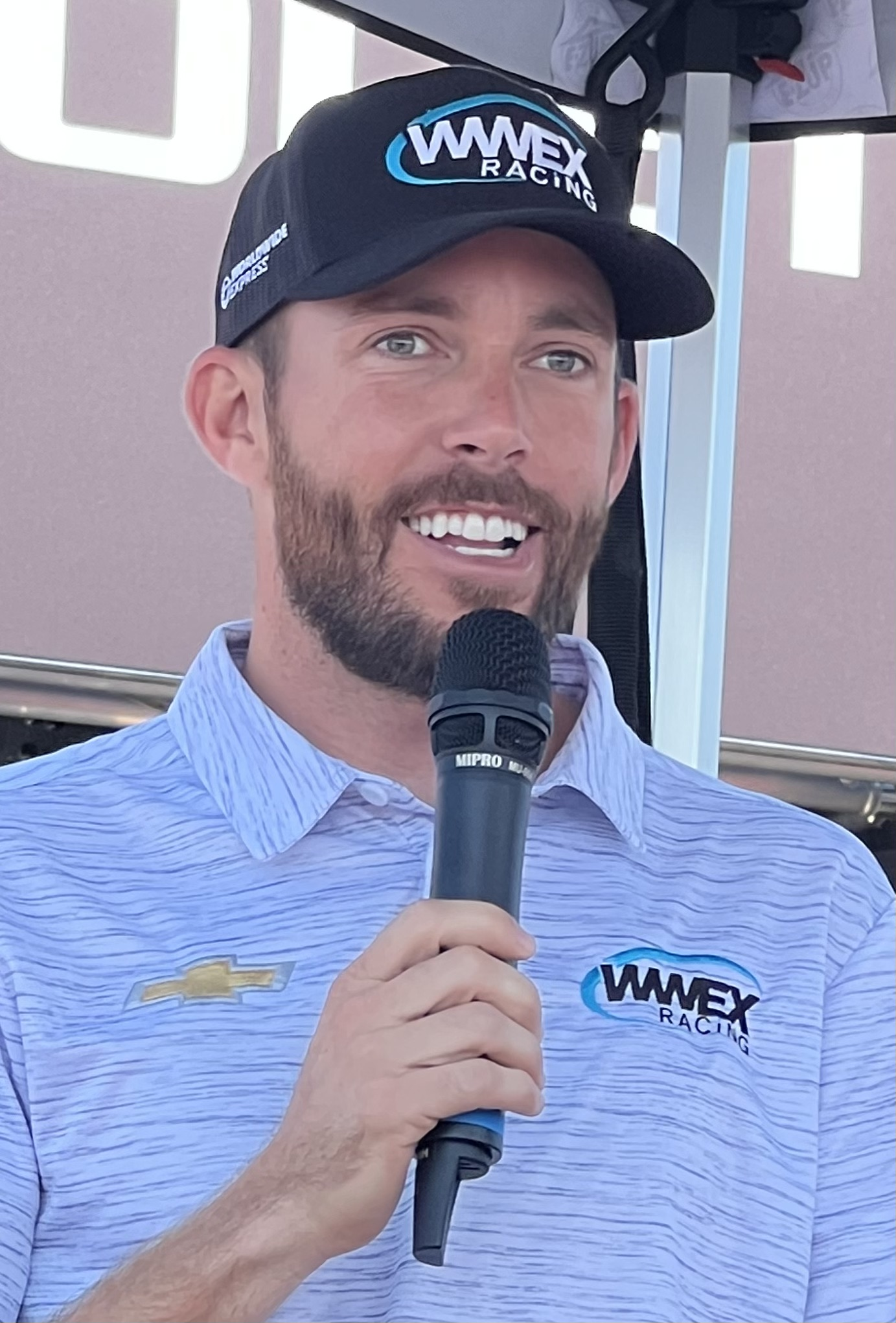
Ross Chastain, finished second behind Logano in the championship.

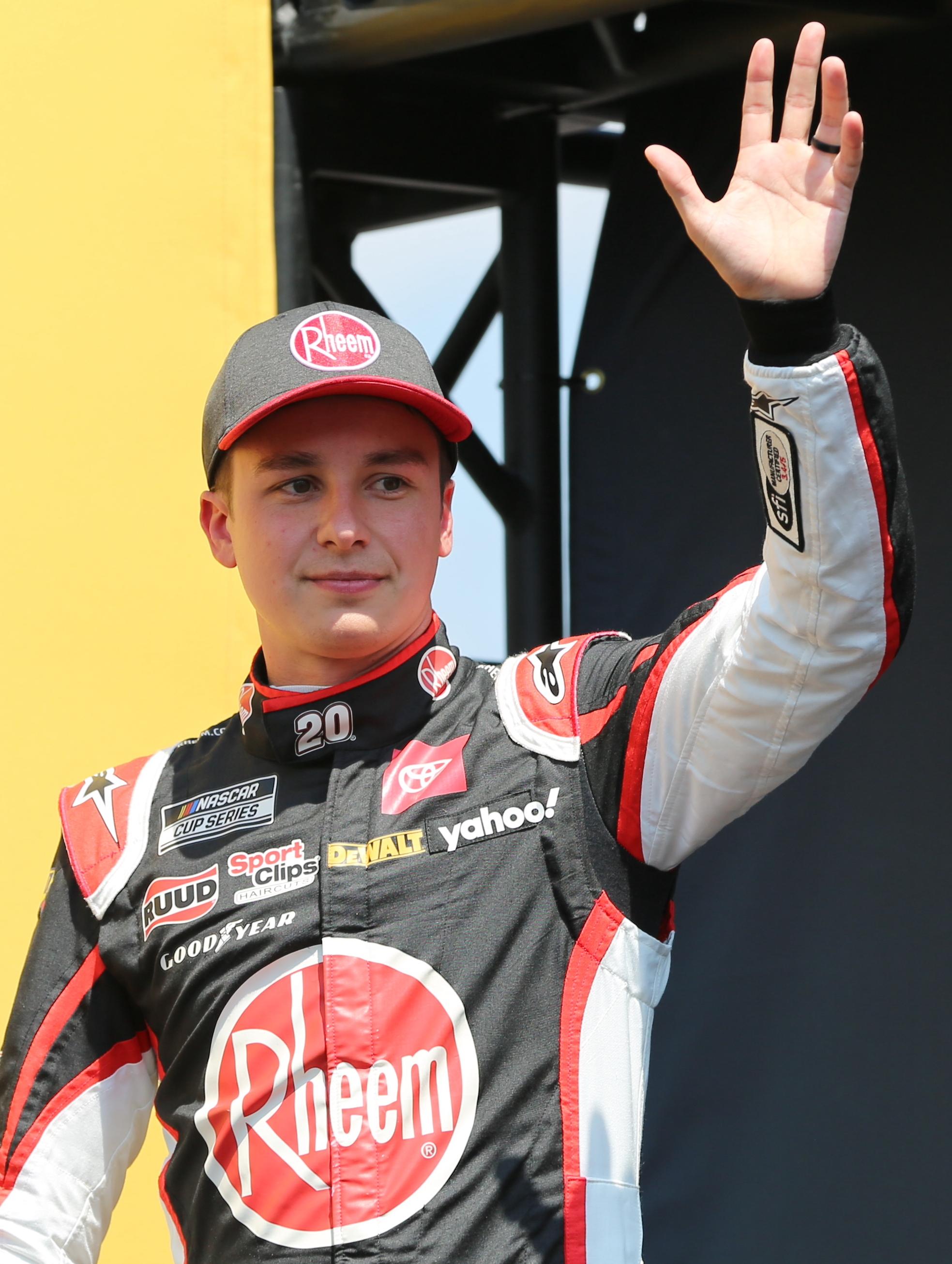
Christopher Bell, finished third in the championship.

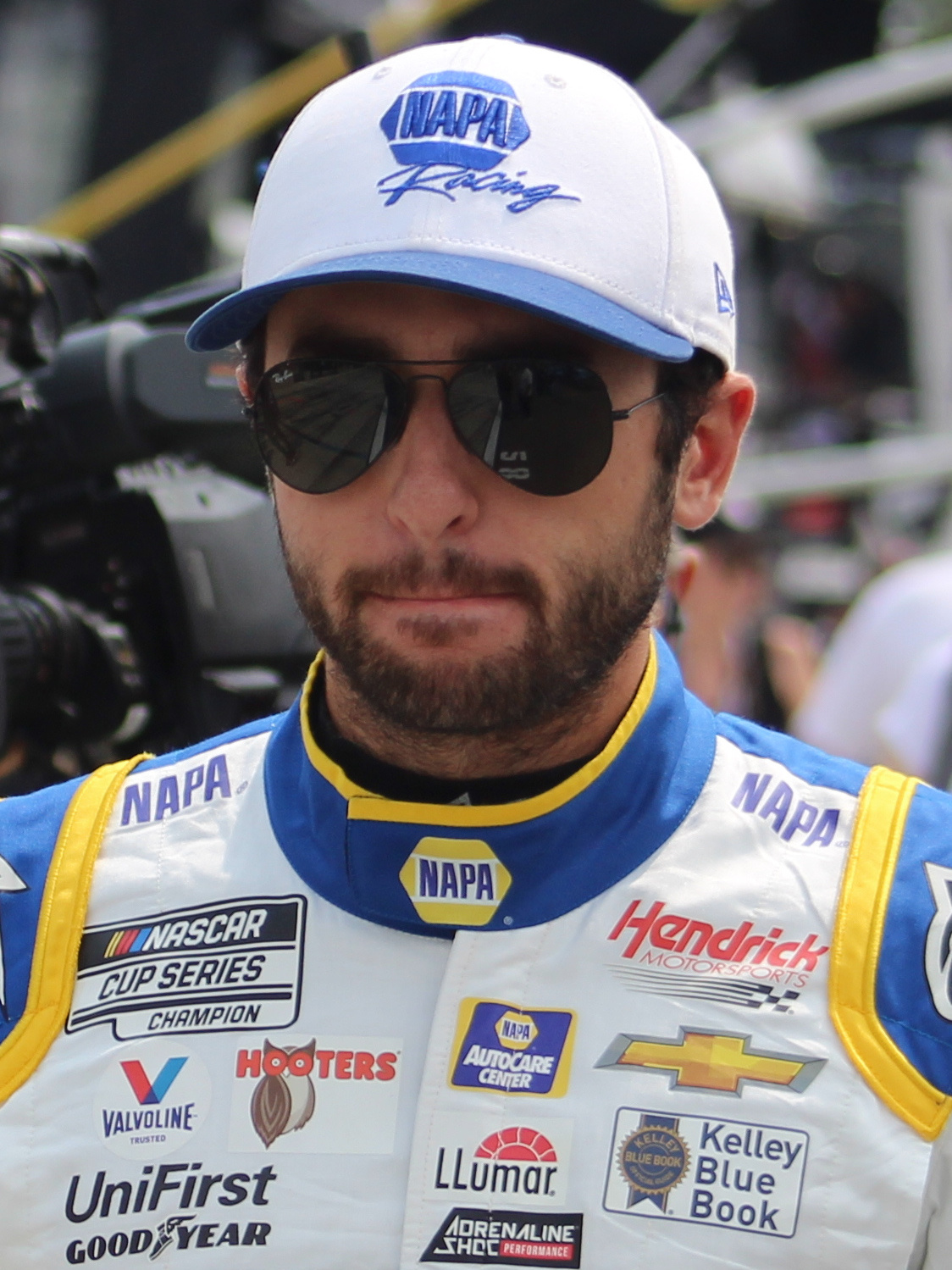
Chase Elliott, the regular season champion, finished fourth in the championship.

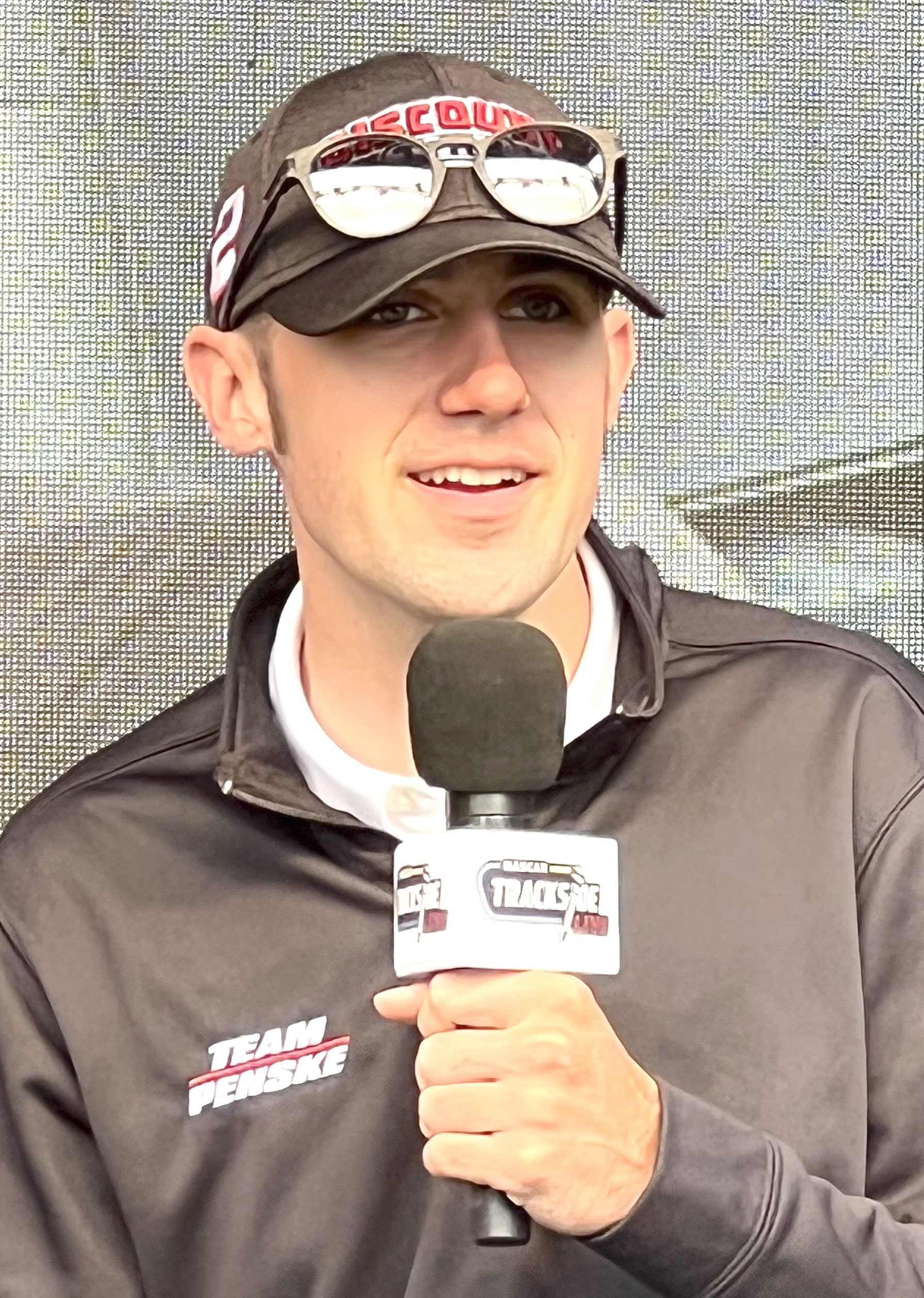
Austin Cindric, the 2022 NASCAR Rookie of the Year.

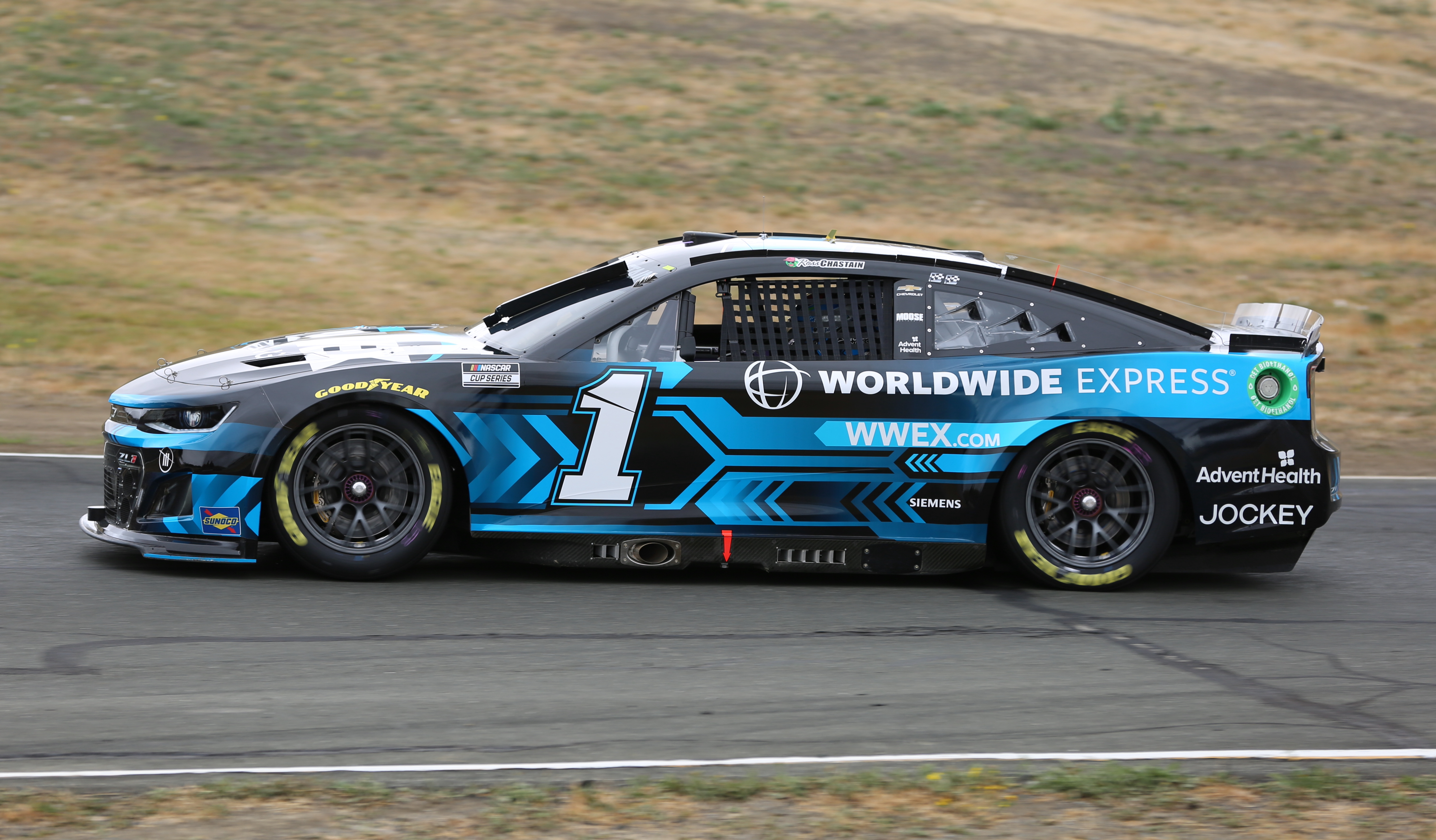
Chevrolet won the manufacturers' championship with 1324 points and 19 wins.

The 2022 NASCAR Cup Series was the 74th season for NASCAR professional stock car racing in the United States and the 51st season for the modern Cup Series. The 2022 season marked the debut of the Next Gen Car, which was originally supposed to debut in 2021, but was postponed due to the COVID-19 pandemic. In addition, this was the first season to have races covered by USA Network, which took over for the then-defunct NBCSN (revived in 2025 by NBC Sports Group).

Chase Elliott of Hendrick Motorsports clinched the regular season championship following the 2022 Go Bowling at The Glen at Watkins Glen International. Prior to the 2022 Xfinity 500 at Martinsville Speedway, Chevrolet clinched its 41st manufacturers' championship. Austin Cindric of Team Penske won the NASCAR Rookie of the Year honors. At the conclusion of the 2022 NASCAR Cup Series Championship Race at Phoenix Raceway, Joey Logano of Team Penske claimed his second Cup Series championship.

This season concluded with 19 different drivers winning a race, which tied the modern-era (1972–present) record set in 2001, making the 2022 season one of the most competitive in history.

== Teams and drivers ==
=== Chartered teams ===
Manufacturer	Team	No.	Driver	Crew chief
Chevrolet	Hendrick Motorsports	5	Kyle Larson	Cliff Daniels 32; Kevin Meendering 4
Chevrolet	Hendrick Motorsports	9	Chase Elliott	Alan Gustafson
Chevrolet	Hendrick Motorsports	24	William Byron	Rudy Fugle
Chevrolet	Hendrick Motorsports	48	Alex Bowman 31	Greg Ives
Chevrolet	Hendrick Motorsports	48	Noah Gragson 5	Greg Ives
Chevrolet	JTG Daugherty Racing	47	Ricky Stenhouse Jr.	Brian Pattie
Chevrolet	Kaulig Racing	16	Daniel Hemric 8	Matt Swiderski 33; George Spencer 3
Chevrolet	Kaulig Racing	16	A. J. Allmendinger 18	Matt Swiderski 33; George Spencer 3
Chevrolet	Kaulig Racing	16	Noah Gragson 10	Matt Swiderski 33; George Spencer 3
Chevrolet	Kaulig Racing	31	Justin Haley	Trent Owens 29; Caleb Williams 6 Jaron Antley 1
Chevrolet	Petty GMS Motorsports	42	Ty Dillon	Jerame Donley 27; Joey Cohen 1 Chad Norris 8
Chevrolet	Petty GMS Motorsports	43	Erik Jones	Dave Elenz 35; Danny Efland 1
Chevrolet	Richard Childress Racing	3	Austin Dillon	Justin Alexander 35; Jim Pohlman 1
Chevrolet	Richard Childress Racing	8	Tyler Reddick	Randall Burnett
Chevrolet	Spire Motorsports	7	Corey LaJoie	Ryan Sparks 32; Peter Sospenzo 4
Chevrolet	Spire Motorsports	77	Landon Cassill 17	Kevin Bellicourt
Chevrolet	Spire Motorsports	77	Josh Bilicki 16	Kevin Bellicourt
Chevrolet	Spire Motorsports	77	Justin Allgaier 1	Kevin Bellicourt
Chevrolet	Spire Motorsports	77	Mike Rockenfeller 2	Kevin Bellicourt
Chevrolet	Trackhouse Racing	1	Ross Chastain	Phil Surgen
Chevrolet	Trackhouse Racing	99	Daniel Suárez	Travis Mack
Ford	Front Row Motorsports	34	Michael McDowell	Blake Harris 32; Chris Yerges 4
Ford	Front Row Motorsports	38	Todd Gilliland (R)	Seth Barbour 32; Troy Raker 4
Ford	Live Fast Motorsports	78	B. J. McLeod 29	Lee Leslie 33; Christopher Stanley 2 Keith Wolfe 1
Ford	Live Fast Motorsports	78	Andy Lally 1	Lee Leslie 33; Christopher Stanley 2 Keith Wolfe 1
Ford	Live Fast Motorsports	78	Josh Williams 3	Lee Leslie 33; Christopher Stanley 2 Keith Wolfe 1
Ford	Live Fast Motorsports	78	Scott Heckert 1	Lee Leslie 33; Christopher Stanley 2 Keith Wolfe 1
Ford	Live Fast Motorsports	78	Kyle Tilley 2	Lee Leslie 33; Christopher Stanley 2 Keith Wolfe 1
Ford	RFK Racing	6	Brad Keselowski	Matt McCall 32; Josh Sell 4
Ford	RFK Racing	17	Chris Buescher 35	Scott Graves 32; Travis Peterson 4
Ford	RFK Racing	17	Zane Smith 1	Scott Graves 32; Travis Peterson 4
Ford	Rick Ware Racing	15	David Ragan 4	Mike Hillman Sr. 2 Ken Evans 3 Kevyn Rebolledo 31
Ford	Rick Ware Racing	15	Garrett Smithley 6	Mike Hillman Sr. 2 Ken Evans 3 Kevyn Rebolledo 31
Ford	Rick Ware Racing	15	Joey Hand 6	Mike Hillman Sr. 2 Ken Evans 3 Kevyn Rebolledo 31
Ford	Rick Ware Racing	15	J. J. Yeley 17	Mike Hillman Sr. 2 Ken Evans 3 Kevyn Rebolledo 31
Ford	Rick Ware Racing	15	Ryan Preece 2	Mike Hillman Sr. 2 Ken Evans 3 Kevyn Rebolledo 31
Ford	Rick Ware Racing	15	Parker Kligerman 1	Mike Hillman Sr. 2 Ken Evans 3 Kevyn Rebolledo 31
Ford	Rick Ware Racing	51	Cody Ware 35	Billy Plourde 32; Ken Evans 4
Ford	Rick Ware Racing	51	J. J. Yeley 1	Billy Plourde 32; Ken Evans 4
Ford	Stewart–Haas Racing	4	Kevin Harvick	Rodney Childers 32; Stephen Doran 4
Ford	Stewart–Haas Racing	10	Aric Almirola	Drew Blickensderfer
Ford	Stewart–Haas Racing	14	Chase Briscoe	Johnny Klausmeier
Ford	Stewart–Haas Racing	41	Cole Custer	Mike Shiplett 32; Tony Cardamone 4
Ford	Team Penske	2	Austin Cindric (R)	Jeremy Bullins 31; Grant Hutchens 5
Ford	Team Penske	12	Ryan Blaney	Jonathan Hassler 32; Miles Stanley 4
Ford	Team Penske	22	Joey Logano	Paul Wolfe
Ford	Wood Brothers Racing	21	Harrison Burton (R)	Brian Wilson
Toyota	23XI Racing	23	Bubba Wallace 26	Bootie Barker 22; Dave Rogers 4 Billy Scott 10
Toyota	23XI Racing	23	Ty Gibbs 9	Bootie Barker 22; Dave Rogers 4 Billy Scott 10
Toyota	23XI Racing	23	Daniel Hemric 1	Bootie Barker 22; Dave Rogers 4 Billy Scott 10
Toyota	23XI Racing	45	Kurt Busch 20	Billy Scott 26; Bootie Barker 10
Toyota	23XI Racing	45	Ty Gibbs 6	Billy Scott 26; Bootie Barker 10
Toyota	23XI Racing	45	Bubba Wallace 9	Billy Scott 26; Bootie Barker 10
Toyota	23XI Racing	45	John Hunter Nemechek 1	Billy Scott 26; Bootie Barker 10
Toyota	Joe Gibbs Racing	11	Denny Hamlin	Chris Gabehart 32; Sam McAulay 4
Toyota	Joe Gibbs Racing	18	Kyle Busch	Ben Beshore 33; Seth Chavka 3
Toyota	Joe Gibbs Racing	19	Martin Truex Jr.	James Small
Toyota	Joe Gibbs Racing	20	Christopher Bell	Adam Stevens

=== Non-chartered teams ===
==== Limited schedule ====
Manufacturer	Team	No.	Driver	Crew chief	Rounds
Chevrolet	Beard Motorsports	62	Noah Gragson	Darren Shaw	3
Chevrolet	Beard Motorsports	62	Justin Allgaier	Darren Shaw	1
Chevrolet	NY Racing Team	44	Greg Biffle	Jay Guy	5
Chevrolet	Richard Childress Racing	33	Austin Hill	Jim Pohlman	1
Chevrolet	The Money Team Racing	50	Kaz Grala	Tony Eury Jr.	3
Chevrolet	The Money Team Racing	50	Conor Daly	Tony Eury Jr.	1
Chevrolet	Trackhouse Racing	91	Kimi Räikkönen	Darian Grubb	1
Ford	MBM Motorsports	55	J. J. Yeley	George Church 1 Jeff Weaver 1	2
Ford	MBM Motorsports	66	Timmy Hill	Jeff Weaver	1
Ford	MBM Motorsports	66	Boris Said	Jeff Weaver	1
Ford	Team Hezeberg powered by Reaume Brothers Racing	27	Jacques Villeneuve	Josh Reaume 3 Mike Gramke 2 Toine Hezemans 1	1
Ford	Team Hezeberg powered by Reaume Brothers Racing	27	Loris Hezemans	Josh Reaume 3 Mike Gramke 2 Toine Hezemans 1	5
Toyota	Team Hezeberg powered by Reaume Brothers Racing	26	Daniil Kvyat	Toine Hezemans 2 Mike Hezemans 1	3

=== Changes ===
==== Teams ====
- On April 28, 2021, Kaulig Racing announced they would run at least one full-time Cup car in 2022. The team made their Cup Series debut in the 2020 Daytona 500 with their Xfinity Series driver Justin Haley driving the No. 16 car. They then entered the No. 16 in all superspeedways (with Kaz Grala) and road course races (with their Xfinity Series driver A. J. Allmendinger) in 2021. On June 18, the team announced that Haley would drive the No. 16 full-time in 2022. On June 5, team owner Matt Kaulig announced that Allmendinger would return to run the road courses and would also run the superspeedway races for the team in the Cup Series in 2022. Because Matt Kaulig also then announced that their full-time car will have one full-time driver, Allmendinger will drive a new second Cup Series car for Kaulig. On June 18, the team announced that they had purchased two charters from Spire Motorsports. On December 14, Kaulig announced that Allmendinger would instead drive the No. 16 and the other drivers sharing the car with him would be Noah Gragson and Daniel Hemric, with Haley driving Kaulig's other car. On December 15, it was announced that Haley's car number would be the No. 31.
- On May 14, 2021, Rick Ware Racing owner Rick Ware told NBC Sports that he may lease out one of his four charters in 2022. On October 10, RWR announced that they would form a technical alliance with Stewart–Haas Racing in 2022 and would field two full-time cars with the possibility of a third if sponsorship can be found.
- On May 29, 2021, Denny Hamlin hinted that 23XI Racing may expand to a two-car operation in 2022, with or without a charter. On August 14, Bob Pockrass of Fox Sports reported a potential deal between 23XI and Front Row Motorsports that would allow 23XI to lease or purchase one of FRM's charters. On August 27, 2021, Kurt Busch was officially announced as the driver of the No. 45 car. On October 3, Jordan Bianchi of The Athletic reported that Hamlin had secured a charter for the No. 45. On October 13, Pockrass reported that they had been working with FRM, but the deal had fallen through. On November 13, David Wilson from Toyota Racing Development revealed in an interview to Jenna Fryer from the Associated Press that 23XI had secured a charter for the No. 45 car. He did not announce which team they got it from and if they purchased it or are leasing it. On November 16, 23XI's president Steve Lauletta confirmed that the team has purchased StarCom Racing's charter for US$13.5 million, the most expensive purchase of the charter since the implementation of the system in 2016.
- On June 10, 2021, Justin Marks stated on Sirius XM NASCAR Radio that his Trackhouse Racing may expand to a two-car operation in 2022. On June 30, the team announced that they had purchased the entirety of Chip Ganassi Racing's NASCAR operations, effective at the end of the 2021 season. On May 24, 2022, Trackhouse announced that they would field a third car, the No. 91, part-time in 2022. The entry will be fielded for international drivers in other racing series through an initiative known as PROJECT91. The car will be fielded in at least one race in 2022 and in additional races in 2023.
- On June 17, 2021, it was announced that the Truck Series team GMS Racing would debut in the Cup Series in 2022. They did not announce whether the team would run full-time or part-time and their car number at the time. On October 10, GMS announced that they would run full-time with Ty Dillon driving the No. 94 car. The team will also have a technical alliance with Richard Childress Racing, the team owned by Dillon's grandfather, Richard Childress. On December 1, GMS purchased a majority interest in Richard Petty Motorsports for US$19 million. The deal includes both of RPM's charters; the No. 43 will continue to operate with its charter while the second charter, which was leased to Rick Ware Racing for the No. 51 from 2019 to 2021, will be transferred to GMS' No. 94. On December 7, the team was renamed Petty GMS Motorsports, with the No. 94 renumbered to the No. 42, a former Petty Enterprises number which became available after Chip Ganassi Racing closed down.
- On June 18, 2021, Spire Motorsports announced the sale of two of its three charters to Kaulig Racing, which left the team with one charter in 2022 for Corey LaJoie's No. 7 car and no charter for their No. 77 car. When Rick Ware Racing scaled back their operations from four full-time cars to two in 2022, they sold their No. 53 charter to Spire; the purchased charter was assigned to the No. 7, with the No. 7's former charter reassigned to the No. 77, with Landon Cassill and Josh Bilicki sharing the ride.
- On August 31, 2021, JTG Daugherty Racing announced that it would scale down to one full-time team (the No. 47) in 2022. The team's No. 37 car, which ran full-time without a charter in 2021, was shut down at the end of the season.
- On September 1, 2021, Catchfence.com reported that StarCom Racing would be selling its charter after the 2021 season. The purchasing team has yet to be announced. On September 15, StarCom Racing's shop foreman and mechanical director Charlie Langenstein prematurely revealed in a since-deleted tweet that the team would shut down at the end of the 2021 season. On November 5, StarCom itself confirmed that they would be closing down. StarCom was in talks to sell its charter to Spire Motorsports, but the deal ultimately fell through. The charter was sold to 23XI Racing for the No. 45 car on November 16.
- On September 7, 2021, Beard Motorsports announced that the team will enter their No. 62 car in the Daytona 500 as well as the other three superspeedway races in 2022. The team only attempted the Daytona 500 in 2021 after previously attempting all Cup Series superspeedway races from 2017 to 2020.
- On October 9, 2021, NASCAR Whelen Euro Series driver Loris Hezemans and Reaume Brothers Racing announced that they would form a new Cup Series team, Team Hezeberg, that will field the No. 27 car part-time in 2022 for Hezemans and fellow Euro Series driver Jacques Villeneuve. Hezemans, who drove part-time in the Xfinity Series for Reaume in partnerships with other teams in 2021, will run all of the road course races with the possibility of some short track races. Villeneuve, whose races in the car have yet to be announced, will make his first Cup Series and NASCAR national series start since 2013. The team hopes to compete in the Cup Series full-time in 2023.
- On November 16, 2021, Roush Fenway Racing announced their rebrand to RFK Racing (Roush Fenway Keselowski Racing) due to Brad Keselowski joining the team as a co-owner.
- On January 19, 2022, Adam Stern from Sports Business Journal reported that The Money Team Racing, a team co-owned by or affiliated with boxer Floyd Mayweather Jr. that has unsuccessfully tried to enter the series since 2019, had secured a car and a sponsor and was finalizing a deal to attempt to qualify for the Daytona 500 with Kaz Grala as the driver of their No. 50 car. On February 1, the team officially announced these plans. In addition, it was revealed that former StarCom Racing owners Michael and Matt Kohler and Bill Woehlemann have invested in the team.
- On February 3, 2022, MBM Motorsports announced that J. J. Yeley would attempt to qualify for the 2022 Daytona 500 in the team's renumbered No. 55 car. This is the fourth straight year that MBM's second car has changed numbers, as it was previously the No. 46 in 2019, the No. 49 in 2020 and the No. 13 in 2021.
- On February 14, 2022, NY Racing Team announced that they would attempt to qualify for the 2022 Daytona 500 with Greg Biffle driving their No. 44 Chevrolet. The team has its car bodies supplied by Richard Childress Racing and engines by Hendrick Motorsports.
- On March 8, 2022, Team Stange Racing announced that they would debut in the Cup Series, fielding the No. 79 Ford part-time for former Formula One and Champ Car driver Tarso Marques. TSR previously fielded part-time entries in the ARCA Menards Series and the ARCA Menards Series East from 2014 to 2016 and collaborated with Arrow Schmidt Peterson Motorsports to field an entry in the 2019 Indianapolis 500. The team was also going to enter the Truck Series race at Sonoma in order for Marques approved to race in the Cup Series although this did not end up happening. On June 27, TSR revealed that they would be postponing their debut from the race at Road America to the race at Watkins Glen with Marques and the team also competing in the Xfinity Series race at the Indianapolis Road Course in order for Marques to be approved to race in the Cup Series. Marques and the team would not end up entering both of these races. On August 22, Marques stated in an interview with Motorsport.com that TSR was "completely late with everything" and that he hoped he could run one or two races before the end of the season, which they ultimately never did.
- On August 4, 2022, it was announced that German racing team 3F Racing plans to debut in the Cup Series, fielding the No. 30 Chevrolet in the last five races of the season starting with the race at the Charlotte Roval. The team would become the first team from Germany to compete in the NASCAR Cup Series. Team owner Dennis Hirtz stated that the team has an alliance with Richard Childress Racing and hopes to run 10 to 12 races in 2023 before running full-time in 2024. The team's drivers, sponsors and crew chief have yet to be announced. The No. 30 car was not on the entry list for the race at the Charlotte Roval, their first scheduled attempt. On October 6, Hirtz told TobyChristie.com that the team would be delaying their debut until 2023.

==== Drivers ====
- On May 18, 2021, Jim Utter from Motorsport.com reported that Brad Keselowski, whose contract with Team Penske ends after the 2021 season, was offered a full-time Cup Series ride with Roush Fenway Racing in 2022, with a partial ownership stake in the team. Later the same day, Bob Pockrass from Fox Sports reported that it was a "done deal, according to multiple industry sources with knowledge of the situation". Keselowski declined to comment on the matter when asked about it in an interview. On July 15, Keselowski released a statement confirming his decision to part ways with Team Penske at the end of the season. On July 20, Roush Fenway Racing officially announced that Keselowski would join the team as a driver/co-owner starting in 2022 and would replace Ryan Newman as the driver of the No. 6 car.
- On May 30, 2021, Jordan Bianchi from The Athletic reported that Kurt Busch, whose contract with Chip Ganassi Racing ends after the 2021 season, was the top candidate for 23XI Racing should they open a second team in 2022. After months of speculation that this would happen, particularly after Trackhouse's purchase of CGR's NASCAR team for 2022, on August 27, 2021, 23XI officially announced that Kurt Busch would drive their new second car, which would be the No. 45, one of team co-owner Michael Jordan's other numbers during his legendary basketball career. On July 23, 2022, Busch suffered a concussion from a crash during qualifying for the 2022 M&M's Fan Appreciation 400 at Pocono. Xfinity Series driver Ty Gibbs substituted him for this race, the Indianapolis road course, Michigan, and Richmond. On August 25, Busch announced he withdrew his request for a playoff waiver. On August 31, 23XI announced that No. 23 driver Bubba Wallace would swap cars with Gibbs during the playoffs, as the No. 45 is still eligible for the owner's championship. On October 18, Wallace was suspended for the Homestead race for intentionally wrecking Kyle Larson at Las Vegas. John Hunter Nemechek was announced as the driver for Homestead.
- On July 15, 2021, Team Penske confirmed that 2020 NASCAR Xfinity Series champion Austin Cindric would replace Brad Keselowski in the No. 2 car in 2022. Cindric drove Team Penske's No. 22 car in the Xfinity Series full-time from 2019 to 2021. He also drove a part-time fourth Team Penske Cup Series car, the No. 33, part-time in 2021.
- On July 15, 2021, Wood Brothers Racing announced that Xfinity Series driver Harrison Burton would drive the No. 21 in 2022. Austin Cindric was originally signed to drive the Penske-affiliated team, but Brad Keselowski's departure from Team Penske resulted in Cindric's move to the No. 2. This driver change made Matt DiBenedetto a free agent in 2022. On August 8, DiBenedetto stated in an interview that he would "entertain anything" when it comes to his 2022 plans, meaning that he was open to moving down to the Xfinity or Truck Series full-time. On January 6, 2022, it was announced that DiBenedetto would move down to the Truck Series and would drive Rackley W.A.R.'s No. 25 truck full-time in 2022.
- On August 3, 2021, Trackhouse Racing announced that Ross Chastain would drive their second car, the No. 1, in 2022.
- On September 1, 2021, Ryan Preece confirmed on SiriusXM NASCAR Radio that he would not be returning to JTG Daugherty Racing, following the announcement that JTG will scale back to a single-team operation in 2022. On January 6, 2022, Stewart–Haas Racing announced that it has hired Preece as a reserve driver in case any of the team's full-time drivers are unable to compete due to COVID-19, an injury, or other unforeseen circumstances. Preece will also be a simulator driver for Ford and run two Cup Series races with Rick Ware Racing in the No. 15 at Dover and the Coca-Cola 600. He will also run three Xfinity Series races for SHR or another Ford team as well as seven Truck Series races for David Gilliland Racing in 2022.
- On October 1, 2021, Bob Pockrass from Fox reported that Ty Dillon was the frontrunner to drive GMS Racing's Cup Series car in 2022. On October 10, GMS announced that he would be their Cup Series driver and would drive the No. 94 full-time in 2022. On December 7, after GMS purchased the majority of Richard Petty Motorsports, it was announced that Dillon would instead drive a second car for the renamed Petty GMS Motorsports, the No. 42, instead of the GMS No. 94.
- On November 9, 2021, Front Row Motorsports announced that Anthony Alfredo would not return to the No. 38 car in 2022. On November 30, FRM's Truck Series driver Todd Gilliland was announced as Alfredo's replacement.
- On November 16, 2021, Beard Motorsports announced that Noah Gragson would return to the No. 62 to attempt to qualify for the 2022 Daytona 500.
- On December 8, 2021, an MBM Motorsports No. 66 Next Gen car featuring Boris Said's name on it was on display at the Performance Racing Industry Trade Show, indicating that he would run select races for the team in 2022. On December 16, MBM owner Carl Long revealed to TobyChristie.com that Said would drive for the team in some of the road course races if sponsorship could be found.
- On December 14, 2021, Kaulig Racing announced that Daniel Hemric (one of their full-time Xfinity Series drivers) and Noah Gragson (who drives full-time for JR Motorsports in the Xfinity Series) would share the No. 16 with A. J. Allmendinger.
- On December 29, 2021, TobyChristie.com reported that Josh Bilicki was likely to leave Rick Ware Racing to take a ride with another Cup Series team and that he was a candidate for the Spire Motorsports No. 77 car. On January 10, 2022, Spire announced that Bilicki would drive the No. 77 for most of the 2022 season starting at California.
- On January 12, 2022, Rick Ware Racing announced that David Ragan would drive their No. 15 car in multiple races in 2022, including the Daytona 500. On January 27, 2022, it was announced that road course ringer Joey Hand, who made his NASCAR debut with RWR in 2021 in their No. 52 car at the Charlotte Roval, would return to the team to run all six road course races in the No. 15 car.
- On January 25, 2022, it was revealed in a podcast interview that J. J. Yeley would drive the No. 13 car for MBM Motorsports in the Daytona 500. On January 27, 2022, MBM owner Carl Long confirmed that this deal was in the works to Bob Pockrass from Fox. On February 3, 2022, MBM officially made this announcement, although the number of the car was switched from the No. 13 to the No. 55.
- On March 8, 2022, it was announced that former Formula One and Champ Car driver Tarso Marques would make his NASCAR debut, driving the new No. 79 car for Team Stange Racing in the Cup Series part-time in 2022. He will be the first driver from Brazil to run a Cup Series race since Nelson Piquet Jr. in the 2014 race at Watkins Glen.
- On April 11, 2022, Live Fast Motorsports announced that Josh Williams, one of the full-time drivers for B. J. McLeod Motorsports, an Xfinity Series team owned by LFM co-owner B. J. McLeod, would make his Cup Series debut in the Bristol dirt race and would drive the LFM No. 78 car.
- On May 26, 2022, it was announced that 2007 Formula 1 World Champion Kimi Räikkönen, who retired from F1 after the 2021 season, would drive the Trackhouse Racing No. 91 car in the race at Watkins Glen. It will be Räikkönen's Cup Series debut and his first NASCAR start since 2011 when he drove in the Truck and Xfinity Series races at Charlotte in May. He will also become the first driver from Finland to have run a Cup Series race.
- On June 2, 2022, RFK Racing announced that Chris Buescher tested positive for COVID-19 and would have to miss the race at Gateway. Fellow Ford driver Zane Smith, who drives full-time in the Truck Series for Front Row Motorsports, would make his Cup Series debut in the race filling in for Buescher in the No. 17 car.
- On July 26, 2022, Team Hezeberg announced that former Formula 1 driver Daniil Kvyat would make his Cup Series debut driving the No. 26 entry at the Indianapolis road course.
- On August 2, 2022, Richard Childress Racing announced that Austin Hill would make his Cup debut in the No. 33 entry at Michigan.
- On August 9, 2022, Spire Motorsports announced that former DTM, 24 Hours of Le Mans and 24 Hours of Daytona champion Mike Rockenfeller would drive the No. 77 at Watkins Glen and the Charlotte Roval.
- On August 31, 2022, it was announced that Bubba Wallace would run the remainder of the 2022 season, consisting of the Playoffs, in the No. 45 car at 23XI Racing as the team would run for the owner's championship. Bubba was in the No. 23 car for 23XI for the regular season. Ty Gibbs, who replaced Kurt Busch in the No. 45 after he suffered a concussion at Pocono, will be in the No. 23 car until Kurt is medically clear to return to racing.
- On September 29, 2022, Alex Bowman announced that he would miss the Talladega playoff race due to a concussion sustained from his crash at Texas. Noah Gragson was announced as the substitute driver of the No. 48 for the race. Bowman sat out the next four races but returned in time to contest the season finale at Phoenix.
- On September 29, 2022, The Money Team Racing announced that IndyCar driver Conor Daly would drive to No. 50 at the Charlotte Roval.
- On October 4, 2022, Cody Ware announced that he would not run the race at the Charlotte Roval due to lingering effects from his injury in a crash in the race at Texas in September on his right foot. J. J. Yeley would fill in for him in the Rick Ware Racing No. 51 in the race.
- On November 6, 2022, Bob Pockrass from Fox revealed that Ty Gibbs would not run the 2022 NASCAR Cup Series Championship Race due to an unspecified family emergency, later revealed to be the death of Coy Gibbs. Daniel Hemric would fill in for Gibbs in the 23XI Racing No. 23 car.

==== Crew chiefs ====
- On June 28, 2021, Team Penske crew chief Todd Gordon announced that 2021 would be his final season as a crew chief. On September 29, it was announced that Jonathan Hassler, who was the crew chief for Matt DiBenedetto and the Wood Brothers Racing No. 21 for part of 2021, would replace Gordon as crew chief of the No. 12 driven by Ryan Blaney. On November 11, 2021, WBR announced that Brian Wilson, who was the crew chief for the No. 22 Team Penske Xfinity Series car from 2018 to 2021, would replace Hassler as the crew chief for the No. 21 car of Harrison Burton in 2022. Wilson won the 2020 Xfinity Series championship with Austin Cindric.
- On October 25, 2021, Chip Ganassi Racing crew chief Phil Surgen, who crew chiefed the team's No. 42 car driven by Ross Chastain in 2021, announced on SiriusXM NASCAR Radio that he would move with Chastain to the Trackhouse Racing No. 1 car in 2022.
- On November 2, 2021, it was announced that Matt McCall, who was previously the crew chief for Kurt Busch and the No. 1 car for Chip Ganassi Racing, would be moving to RFK Racing to be the crew chief for Brad Keselowski and the No. 6 car.
- On November 5, 2021, Richard Petty Motorsports announced that Dave Elenz, who was Noah Gragson's crew chief in the NASCAR Xfinity Series, will move to the Cup Series to be the crew chief of Erik Jones, replacing Jerry Baxter. Baxter will move to David Gilliland Racing to crew chief Tanner Gray's No. 15 in the Truck Series in 2022.
- On November 16, 2021, GMS Racing announced that former Chip Ganassi Racing engineer Jerame Donley will be the crew chief for Ty Dillon and the No. 94 car. When GMS bought the majority of Richard Petty Motorsports and the team was renamed Petty GMS Motorsports, it was announced that Dillon and Donley would instead drive and crew chief a second Petty GMS car, the No. 42, instead of the GMS No. 94. On September 13, 2022, Petty GMS announced that Chad Norris would replace Donley for the remainder of the 2022 season, starting with the Bristol night race.
- On December 17, 2021, Front Row Motorsports announced that Drew Blickensderfer would not return to the team in 2022. He was the crew chief for their No. 34 car and Michael McDowell since 2018 and they won the 2021 Daytona 500. On January 4, 2022, Stewart–Haas Racing announced that Blickensderfer would become the crew chief of the No. 10 driven by Aric Almirola, with Mike Bugarewicz promoted to performance director.
- On January 6, 2022, Front Row Motorsports announced that Blake Harris would replace Drew Blickensderfer as the crew chief for Michael McDowell in the No. 34 in 2022. He was previously the car chief for Martin Truex Jr.'s No. 19 car for Joe Gibbs Racing.
- On January 8, 2022, Kaulig Racing announced that Trent Owens, the crew chief of the No. 37 JTG Daugherty Racing car which closed down, would be the crew chief of the team's new No. 31 car driven by Justin Haley. Owens also was previously a crew chief for Braun Racing, a former Xfinity Series team owned by Todd Braun, who is Justin Haley's uncle.
- On February 1, 2022, it was announced that Tony Eury Jr. would return to NASCAR to be the crew chief for The Money Team Racing and their No. 50 car. It was his first time crew chiefing in the Cup Series since 2018 when he was the crew chief for Danica Patrick's final NASCAR race in the 2018 Daytona 500 with Premium Motorsports.
- On May 26, 2022, Trackhouse Racing announced that Darian Grubb, the team's Director of Performance, would be the crew chief of the team's new part-time third car, the No. 91, in its debut at Watkins Glen with Kimi Räikkönen driving. It would be Grubb's first time crew chiefing since 2018. He won the 2006 Daytona 500 as the interim crew chief for Jimmie Johnson and the 2011 Cup Series championship as the crew chief for Tony Stewart.

==== Interim crew chiefs ====
- On November 7, 2021, NASCAR announced that Kyle Busch's crew chief Ben Beshore would be suspended for the 2022 Busch Light Clash at The Coliseum after the No. 18 car had two loose lug nuts following the 2021 NASCAR Cup Series Championship Race at Phoenix. Seth Chavka, the No. 18 car's engineer, was Busch's crew chief for the exhibition race. Chavka was also Busch's interim crew chief at Texas in October 2021 and JGR's No. 20 car, then driven by Erik Jones, at Darlington in May 2020. On October 18, Beshore was suspended for four races due to a tire and wheel loss during the 2022 South Point 400 at Las Vegas. Chavka was announced as the crew chief of the No. 18 for the remainder of the season.
- On December 3, 2021, NASCAR announced that MBM Motorsports crew chief Johnny Roten would be indefinitely suspended after violating the substance abuse policy in the NASCAR rulebook. MBM has yet to announce if Roten will return to the team as a crew chief in 2022 after his suspension is lifted. Roten crew chiefed MBM's No. 66 car in 13 races in 2021 as well as their No. 13 car in one race. For the 2022 Daytona 500, Jeff Weaver was the crew chief for the No. 66 and George Church was the crew chief for the No. 55 (which was previously the No. 13).
- On January 31, 2022, Jerame Donley, the crew chief for Ty Dillon's No. 42 car for Petty GMS Motorsports, was replaced on the entry list for the Clash by Joey Cohen, the competition director for Petty GMS. On February 1, 2022, Joseph Srigley from TobyChristie.com revealed that Donley would miss the race due to his wife expecting a baby. On July 23, 2022, NASCAR announced that Donley and Dave Elenz, the crew chief for the other Petty GMS car, the No. 43, would both be suspended for the race at Pocono due to rocker box assembly violations. Cohen would again fill in for Donley as the crew chief of the No. 42 car and Danny Efland, the engineer for the No. 43 car, would be the interim crew chief for the No. 43 car, filling in for Elenz.
- On February 23, 2022, Trent Owens, the crew chief of the Kaulig Racing No. 31 car driven by Justin Haley, was suspended for four races due to a tire and wheel loss during the 2022 Daytona 500. Because Kaulig appealed the penalty and the appeal did not occur until March 16, 2022, the four race suspension was put on hold and Owens still crew chiefed the No. 31 car at Fontana, Las Vegas and Phoenix. The penalty was upheld and the team decided to not file a final appeal and Owens was suspended for the races at Atlanta, COTA, Richmond and Martinsville. The interim crew chief for the No. 31 car for these four races was Caleb Williams, a tire technician for Kaulig's No. 10 car in the Xfinity Series driven by Landon Cassill. On May 17, Owens was again suspended for four races due to another tire and wheel loss during the 2022 AdventHealth 400 at Kansas. Caleb Williams would return to the interim crew chief role for the No. 31 car at the Texas All-Star Race, Charlotte and Gateway. Jaron Antley, the car chief of the No. 31 car, would serve as the interim crew chief at Sonoma instead of Williams.
- On February 23, 2022, Tony Eury Jr., the crew chief of The Money Team Racing No. 50 car driven by Kaz Grala, was suspended for four races due to a tire and wheel loss during the 2022 Daytona 500. With the No. 50 car only running part-time and none of the next four races being part of the team's part-time schedule, Eury Jr. did not miss any races.
- On March 1, 2022, Seth Barbour, the crew chief of the Front Row Motorsports No. 38 car driven by Todd Gilliland, was suspended for four races due to a tire and wheel loss during the 2022 WISE Power 400 at Fontana. Because FRM appealed the penalty and the appeal did not occur until March 16, 2022, the four race suspension was put on hold and Barbour still crew chiefed the No. 38 car at Las Vegas and Phoenix. The penalty was upheld and the team decided to not file a final appeal and Barbour was suspended for the races at Atlanta, COTA, Richmond and Martinsville. The interim crew chief for the No. 38 car for these four races was Troy Raker, the car's engineer. Raker was previously an interim crew chief in nine races in 2007 for the Team Penske No. 2 car driven by Kurt Busch.
- On March 15, 2022, Ryan Sparks, the crew chief of the Spire Motorsports No. 7 car driven by Corey LaJoie, was suspended for four races due to a tire and wheel loss during the 2022 Ruoff Mortgage 500 at Phoenix. The team decided not to appeal the penalty and Peter Sospenzo, who was the crew chief of Spire's No. 77 car in 2019 and 2020 (which included crew chiefing an upset win for the No. 77 car at Daytona in July 2019 with Justin Haley), was the interim crew chief for the No. 7 car at Atlanta, COTA, Richmond and Martinsville.
- On March 24, 2022, Matt McCall, the crew chief of the RFK Racing No. 6 car driven by Brad Keselowski, was suspended for four races and fined US$100,000 for an L2 Penalty during post-race inspection after the 2022 Folds of Honor QuikTrip 500 at Atlanta. The penalty came under Sections 14.1 and 14.5 in the NASCAR Rule Book, both of which pertain to the modification of a single-source supplied part. (On April 13, Scott Miller, NASCAR's senior vice president of competition, explained that the repairs No. 6's rear fascia did not meet original specifications, as a critical dimension of the part was altered.) In addition, the No. 6 team was docked 100 driver and owner points and 10 playoff points. Josh Sell, the car's engineer, would serve as Keselowski's interim crew chief at COTA, Richmond, Martinsville and the Bristol dirt race.
- On March 29, 2022, Bootie Barker, the crew chief of the 23XI Racing No. 23 car driven by Bubba Wallace, was suspended for four races due to a tire and wheel loss during the 2022 EchoPark Texas Grand Prix at COTA. The team decided not to appeal the penalty and Dave Rogers, the director of performance for 23XI and a former Joe Gibbs Racing crew chief, was announced as Wallace's crew chief for Richmond, Martinsville, the Bristol dirt race, and Talladega.
- On April 27, 2022, Lee Leslie, the crew chief of the Live Fast Motorsports No. 78 car driven by B. J. McLeod, was suspended for four races due to a tire and wheel loss during the 2022 GEICO 500 at Talladega. The team decided not to appeal the penalty and Christopher Stanley, an engineer for LFM, would serve as the car's interim crew chief at Dover and Darlington and Keith Wolfe, a crew chief for LFM co-owner B. J. McLeod's Xfinity Series team, B. J. McLeod Motorsports, would serve as the interim crew chief at Kansas and the Texas All-Star Race.
- On May 3, 2022, Chris Gabehart, the crew chief of the Joe Gibbs Racing No. 11 car driven by Denny Hamlin, was suspended for four races due to a tire and wheel loss during the 2022 DuraMAX Drydene 400 at Dover. Because JGR appealed the penalty and the appeal did not occur until May 18, 2022, the four race suspension was put on hold and Gabehart still crew chiefed the No. 11 car at Darlington and Kansas. The penalty was upheld and the team decided to not file a final appeal and Gabehart was suspended for the races at Charlotte, Gateway, Sonoma and Nashville. The Texas All-Star Race was originally counted as one of the four races, but after the final appeal, NASCAR allowed Gabehart to crew chief the car in that race and suspend him for the race at Nashville instead. Sam McAulay, the No. 11 car's engineer, would serve as the interim crew chief in these four races. This is his second time serving as an interim crew chief as he previously was in the role for the team in 2020 when Gabehart was suspended for four races that year.
- On May 3, 2022, Matt Swiderski, the crew chief of the Kaulig Racing No. 16 car driven by Daniel Hemric, A. J. Allmendinger, and Noah Gragson, was suspended for four races due to a tire and wheel loss during the 2022 DuraMAX Drydene 400 at Dover. The team decided not to appeal the penalty and George Spencer, an engineer for Kaulig, would serve as the interim crew chief for the No. 16 car at Darlington, Kansas, the Texas All-Star Race, and Charlotte.
- On May 14, 2022, Justin Alexander, the crew chief of the Richard Childress Racing No. 3 car driven by Austin Dillon, was forced to miss the 2022 AdventHealth 400 at Kansas due to COVID-19 protocols. Jim Pohlman, a mechanic for RCR, served as the car's interim crew chief in that race.
- On May 29, 2022, Jeremy Bullins, the crew chief of the Team Penske No. 2 car driven by Austin Cindric, got sick and had to miss that day's race, the 2022 Coca-Cola 600 at Charlotte. Grant Hutchens, the car's engineer, filled in as the interim crew chief. This was his third time serving as an interim crew chief as he previously was in the role for the team two separate times in 2021 when Bullins was suspended one race due to loose lug nuts on the No. 2 car (which was then driven by Keselowski) and another two races due to COVID-19 protocols. On July 20, 2022, Bullins was suspended for four races due to a tire and wheel loss during the 2022 Ambetter 301 at Loudon. The team decided to not appeal the penalty and Hutchens returned to fill in for Bullins for the races at Pocono, the Indianapolis road course, Michigan and Richmond.
- On June 14, 2022, Cliff Daniels, the crew chief of the Hendrick Motorsports No. 5 car driven by Kyle Larson, was suspended for four races due to a tire and wheel loss during the 2022 Toyota/Save Mart 350 at Sonoma. The team decided not to appeal the penalty and Kevin Meendering was announced as Larson's interim crew chief for the races at Nashville, Road America, Atlanta in July and New Hampshire.
- On June 28, 2022, Scott Graves, the crew chief of the RFK Racing No. 17 driven by Chris Buescher, was suspended for four races due to a tire and wheel loss during the 2022 Ally 400 at Nashville. The team decided to appeal the penalty and Graves was still the crew chief of the car at Road America and would have been for any other races until the appeal date. However, after the race at Road America, the team changed their mind and decided to withdraw the appeal, meaning that Graves would be suspended for the next four races of Atlanta, New Hampshire, Pocono and the Indianapolis road course. Travis Peterson, the engineer of the No. 17 car, was the interim crew chief.
- On July 26, 2022, Blake Harris, the crew chief of the Front Row Motorsports No. 34 car driven by Michael McDowell, was suspended for four races and fined US$100,000 for an L2 Penalty during post-race inspection after the 2022 M&M's Fan Appreciation 400 at Pocono. The penalty came under Sections 14.1 C, D and Q and 14.5 A and B in the NASCAR Rule Book, both of which pertain to the body and overall vehicle assembly rules surrounding modification of a single-source supplied part. In addition, the No. 34 team was docked 100 driver and owner points and 10 playoff points. On August 3, 2022, lead engineer Chris Yerges was announced as the interim crew chief.
- On August 23, 2022, Billy Plourde, the crew chief of the No. 51 Rick Ware Racing car driven by Cody Ware, was suspended for four races after the car lost its ballast in the race at Watkins Glen. The team decided not to appeal the penalty and Ken Evans, the team's Vice President of Operations, filled in as interim crew chief at Daytona, Darlington, Kansas and Bristol.
- On September 20, 2022, Jonathan Hassler, the crew chief of the Team Penske No. 12 driven by Ryan Blaney, was suspended for four races due to a tire and wheel loss during the 2022 Bass Pro Shops Night Race at Bristol. The team decided to appeal the penalty and Hassler was still the crew chief of the car at Texas and would have been for any other races until the appeal date. However, on September 26, 2022, after the race at Texas, the team changed their mind and decided to withdraw the appeal, meaning that Hassler would be suspended for the next four races of Talladega, the Charlotte Roval, Las Vegas and Homestead-Miami. Miles Stanley, the engineer of the Penske-aligned Wood Brothers Racing No. 21 car, was the interim crew chief. In 2021, Stanley was the engineer for Blaney and the No. 12 car and was also the crew chief of Penske's part-time fourth Cup Series car, the No. 33.
- On October 5, 2022, Rodney Childers, the crew chief of the Stewart–Haas Racing No. 4 car driven by Kevin Harvick, was suspended for four races and fined US$100,000 for an L2 Penalty during post-race inspection after the 2022 YellaWood 500 at Talladega. The penalty came under Sections 14.1 (vehicle assembly) and 14.5 (body) in the NASCAR Rule Book, both of which pertain to the body and overall vehicle assembly rules surrounding modification of a single-source supplied part. In addition, the No. 4 team was docked 100 driver and owner points. SHR decided to appeal the penalty although the team chose to have Stephen Doran, the engineer for the No. 4 car, serve as the interim crew chief for the next four races (the Charlotte Roval, Las Vegas, Homestead-Miami and Martinsville) rather than have Childers crew chief until the appeal date as they want Childers to crew chief the car in the season-finale at Phoenix.
- On October 11, 2022, Mike Shiplett, the crew chief of the Stewart–Haas Racing No. 41 car driven by Cole Custer, was indefinitely suspended and fined US$100,000 after Custer intentionally slowed down and checked up on the last lap of the 2022 Bank of America Roval 400 at the Charlotte Roval so his SHR teammate Chase Briscoe would advance to the next round of the playoffs. In addition, the No. 41 team was docked 50 owner and driver points. Tony Cardamone, the No. 41 car's car chief, would serve as the interim crew chief from Las Vegas to the Phoenix season finale. On October 27, the National Motorsports Appeals Panel upheld the No. 41 team's penalty.

==== Manufacturers ====
- On October 10, 2021, Rick Ware Racing announced that they will run only Fords in 2022 after forming a technical alliance with Stewart–Haas Racing. The team's Cup Series cars had previously been a mixture of used Fords and Chevrolets.

== Rule changes ==
- On August 27, 2021, it was announced that the car numbers would be moved forward on the Cup Series cars beginning in 2022, coinciding with the debut of the Next-Gen car. NASCAR experimented with car number placement at the 2020 All-Star Race by moving the numbers back. Either of those movements results in more space for sponsor logos and therefore more revenue for the race teams.
- On November 19, 2021, NASCAR announced the new practice and qualifying formats across all three national series in 2022. The formats are as follows:

- Oval races: After a 15-minute practice period, the field will be separated into two groups, each running one lap (two laps at Martinsville, Bristol, Richmond, and Dover). The top five of each group will advance to the final round of qualifying, with the fastest lap earning the Busch Pole.
- Daytona, Talladega, Atlanta: All cars run one lap each, with the top 10 transferring to the final round.
  - Daytona 500: All cars run one lap each, with the top 10 transferring to the final round. Only the top two cars qualify, with the field determined in 60-lap heat races.
- Road courses: After a 20-minute practice period, the field will be separated into two groups, each running a 15-minute timed session. The top five of each group will advance to the final round, which consists of a 10-minute timed session.
- Bristol dirt race: Standard dirt race procedure (as used in Four qualifying races will determine the starting lineup).
- The Daytona 500, first Atlanta race, Bristol dirt, Gateway, Nashville, and the Phoenix season ending race will have one 50-minute practice session.

- On December 17, 2021, NASCAR announced that teams will be allowed to use chrome numbers in 2022.
- On January 24, 2022, NASCAR announced a more stringent penalty system structure for the Cup Series. The penalty system is structured in three tiers from L1 to L3, with L3 reserved for the tampering and counterfeiting of Next Gen single-source vendor parts. L3 violations will result in a deduction of owner and driver points (including playoff points), revocation of playoff eligibility, crew member suspensions, or postseason bans.
- On March 11, 2022, NASCAR announced that the reconfigured Atlanta Motor Speedway would have the track limits enforced similar to restrictions previously in place at Daytona International Speedway and Talladega Superspeedway.

== Schedule ==
The 2022 schedule was released on September 15, 2021.

No	Race title	Track	Location	Date	Time (ET)
	Busch Light Clash at The Coliseum	O Los Angeles Memorial Coliseum	Los Angeles, California	February 6	6:00 pm
	Bluegreen Vacations Duel	O Daytona International Speedway	Daytona Beach, Florida	February 17	7:00 pm
1	**Daytona 500**	O Daytona International Speedway	Daytona Beach, Florida	February 20	2:30 pm
2	WISE Power 400	O Auto Club Speedway	Fontana, California	February 27	3:30 pm
3	Pennzoil 400 presented by Jiffy Lube	O Las Vegas Motor Speedway	Las Vegas, Nevada	March 6	3:30 pm
4	Ruoff Mortgage 500	O Phoenix Raceway	Avondale, Arizona	March 13	3:30 pm
5	Folds of Honor QuikTrip 500	O Atlanta Motor Speedway	Hampton, Georgia	March 20	3:00 pm
6	EchoPark Texas Grand Prix	R Circuit of the Americas	Austin, Texas	March 27	3:30 pm
7	Toyota Owners 400	O Richmond Raceway	Richmond, Virginia	April 3	3:30 pm
8	Blue-Emu Maximum Pain Relief 400	O Martinsville Speedway	Ridgeway, Virginia	April 9	7:30 pm
9	Food City Dirt Race	D Bristol Motor Speedway (Dirt Course)	Bristol, Tennessee	April 17	7:00 pm
10	GEICO 500	O Talladega Superspeedway	Lincoln, Alabama	April 24	3:00 pm
11	DuraMAX Drydene 400 presented by RelaDyne	O Dover Motor Speedway	Dover, Delaware	May 1–2	3:00 pm
12	Goodyear 400	O Darlington Raceway	Darlington, South Carolina	May 8	3:30 pm
13	AdventHealth 400	O Kansas Speedway	Kansas City, Kansas	May 15	3:00 pm
	NASCAR All Star Open	O Texas Motor Speedway	Fort Worth, Texas	May 22	5:30 pm
	NASCAR All-Star Race	O Texas Motor Speedway	Fort Worth, Texas	May 22	8:00 pm
14	**Coca-Cola 600**	O Charlotte Motor Speedway	Concord, North Carolina	May 29	6:00 pm
15	Enjoy Illinois 300 presented by TicketSmarter	O World Wide Technology Raceway	Madison, Illinois	June 5	3:30 pm
16	Toyota/Save Mart 350	R Sonoma Raceway	Sonoma, California	June 12	4:00 pm
17	Ally 400	O Nashville Superspeedway	Lebanon, Tennessee	June 26	5:00 pm
18	Kwik Trip 250	R Road America	Elkhart Lake, Wisconsin	July 3	3:00 pm
19	Quaker State 400 presented by Walmart	O Atlanta Motor Speedway	Hampton, Georgia	July 10	3:00 pm
20	Ambetter 301	O New Hampshire Motor Speedway	Loudon, New Hampshire	July 17	3:00 pm
21	M&M's Fan Appreciation 400	O Pocono Raceway	Long Pond, Pennsylvania	July 24	3:00 pm
22	Verizon 200 at the Brickyard	R Indianapolis Motor Speedway (Road Course)	Speedway, Indiana	July 31	2:30 pm
23	FireKeepers Casino 400	O Michigan International Speedway	Brooklyn, Michigan	August 7	3:00 pm
24	Federated Auto Parts 400	O Richmond Raceway	Richmond, Virginia	August 14	3:00 pm
25	Go Bowling at The Glen	R Watkins Glen International	Watkins Glen, New York	August 21	3:00 pm
26	Coke Zero Sugar 400	O Daytona International Speedway	Daytona Beach, Florida	August 28	10:05 am
NASCAR Cup Series Playoffs
Round of 16
27	**Cook Out Southern 500**	O Darlington Raceway	Darlington, South Carolina	September 4	6:00 pm
28	Hollywood Casino 400	O Kansas Speedway	Kansas City, Kansas	September 11	3:00 pm
29	Bass Pro Shops Night Race	O Bristol Motor Speedway	Bristol, Tennessee	September 17	7:30 pm
Round of 12
30	Autotrader EchoPark Automotive 500	O Texas Motor Speedway	Fort Worth, Texas	September 25	3:30 pm
31	YellaWood 500	O Talladega Superspeedway	Lincoln, Alabama	October 2	2:00 pm
32	Bank of America Roval 400	R Charlotte Motor Speedway (Roval)	Concord, North Carolina	October 9	2:00 pm
Round of 8
33	South Point 400	O Las Vegas Motor Speedway	Las Vegas, Nevada	October 16	2:30 pm
34	Dixie Vodka 400	O Homestead–Miami Speedway	Homestead, Florida	October 23	2:30 pm
35	Xfinity 500	O Martinsville Speedway	Ridgeway, Virginia	October 30	2:00 pm
Championship 4
36	NASCAR Cup Series Championship Race	O Phoenix Raceway	Avondale, Arizona	November 6	3:00 pm

Bolded races indicate a NASCAR Major, also known as a Crown Jewel race.

D Dirt track
O Oval track
R Road course

=== Schedule changes ===
- Auto Club Speedway returned to the schedule for the first time since 2020 after state COVID-19 regulations in California forced the cancellation of the 2021 race. It was scheduled for the weekend after the Daytona 500 (February 25, 26, and 27), which made it the second race of the season for the first time since 2010, replacing the Daytona Road Course. This was also scheduled to be the last race at the track before its proposed reconfiguration into a short track for 2023, although the project was later put on hold.
- On August 21, 2021, Sports Business Journal reported that NASCAR was in talks to have World Wide Technology Raceway (Gateway) in Madison, Illinois host a Cup Series race in 2022. On September 8, Adam Stern of Sports Business Journal reported that the 2022 schedule to be announced in mid-September would add Gateway and remove one of the Pocono races. This was confirmed on September 14 by The Athletic, with Gateway scheduled on June 5.
- On September 14, 2021, NASCAR announced that the Busch Clash would move to the Los Angeles Memorial Coliseum. The Clash was moved because of a situation that developed with 2021 NFL league year changes (17-game season over 18 weeks moved Super Bowl LVI back one week) announced after the 2022 Daytona 500 date had been announced. They also announced that for the first time since 1989, there will be a Cup race on Easter Sunday. Only one off-week was on the schedule in 2022 (Father's Day due to NBC's Coverage of the 2022 U.S. Open).
- NASCAR also announced that the Dixie Vodka 400 at Homestead–Miami Speedway would be returning to the NASCAR Playoffs for 2022 but not as the final race of the season, as it had been from 2002 through 2019. Instead, Homestead is to join Las Vegas and Martinsville as the tracks composing the Round of 8 in the quest for the championship. In order to make room for Homestead in the Playoff schedule, the Federated Auto Parts 400 at Richmond, which had been run as a Playoffs event since 2018, was rescheduled for August.
- On January 10, 2022, it was announced that the race at Sonoma will go back to using the 1.99 mile club circuit instead of the 2.52 mile full circuit used from 1989 to 1997 and from 2019 to 2021.

=== Broadcast changes ===
NBC Sports' portion of the NASCAR Cup Series featured races on USA Network instead of NBCSN, due to NBC Sports shutting down NBCSN at the end of 2021. Races on the NBC television network will remain the same. The 2022 Coke Zero Sugar 400 was moved to CNBC on August 28 due to a rain delay.

== Season summary ==
The season started at the Los Angeles Memorial Coliseum on February 6 with the Busch Light Clash at The Coliseum. That race was followed by the Bluegreen Vacations Duel qualifying races on February 17 and the 64th running of the Daytona 500, the first points race of the season, at Daytona International Speedway on February 20. The regular season ended with the Coke Zero Sugar 400, also at Daytona, on August 27. The NASCAR playoffs began with the Cook Out Southern 500 at Darlington Raceway on September 4 and ended with the NASCAR Cup Series Championship Race at Phoenix Raceway on November 6 where Joey Logano earned his second career Cup Series championship after a 4-win season.

The 2022 season marked the debut of the Next Gen Car, which was originally supposed to debut in 2021, but was postponed due to the COVID-19 pandemic.

This was the first season to have races covered by USA Network, taking over for the now-defunct NBCSN, and marks the final season for Mars, Incorporated as a NASCAR sponsor, as the company announced on December 20, 2021, that it would leave NASCAR following the 2022 season. This is also the final season for Kyle Busch driving the JGR No. 18. After months of contract negotiations with Busch and trying to find a replacement sponsor for M&M's in 2023, JGR was unable to get a deal done and Busch announced he would be leaving for Richard Childress Racing for 2023.

2022 was also the final season of 2004 Cup Champ Kurt Busch. Busch was sidelined after a crash during qualifying at Pocono Raceway where he sustained a concussion. Busch announced in 2022 that he would not compete full time again in NASCAR, and in 2023 officially confirmed his retirement and will not start in a Cup Car again.

This season brought the end of a 62-year streak without a disqualification of a race winner (which started in 1960). In the race at Pocono Raceway, Denny Hamlin was stripped of the win after failing post-race inspection. (After that, the win was given to initial third-place finisher Chase Elliott due to the initial second-place finisher, Kyle Busch, Hamlin's Joe Gibbs Racing teammate, also failing post-race inspection and being disqualified.) It is the first time it has happened in a Cup Series race since the rule disqualifying the winner if their car failed post-race inspection was added in 2019. Additionally, the race at Watkins Glen International featured drivers from seven different countries competing in the race, the most in series history.

Following the Watkins Glen race, Elliott of Hendrick Motorsports clinched the regular season championship. Prior to the 2022 Xfinity 500 at Martinsville Speedway, Chevrolet clinched its 41st manufacturers' championship. Austin Cindric of Team Penske won the NASCAR Rookie of the Year honors.

This season concluded with 19 different drivers winning a race, which tied the modern-era (1972–present) record set in 2001. Five drivers (Austin Cindric, Chase Briscoe, Ross Chastain, Daniel Suárez, and Tyler Reddick) won their first career races. Chastain, Reddick, Christopher Bell, Bubba Wallace, and Chris Buescher won their second career races. (Wallace and Buescher also won their first non-weather shortened races.) William Byron, Reddick, Bell, and Erik Jones won their third career races while Byron, Bell, and Austin Dillon won their fourth, making the 2022 season one of the most competitive in history.

=== Regular season ===
==== Exhibition: Busch Light Clash at The Coliseum ====
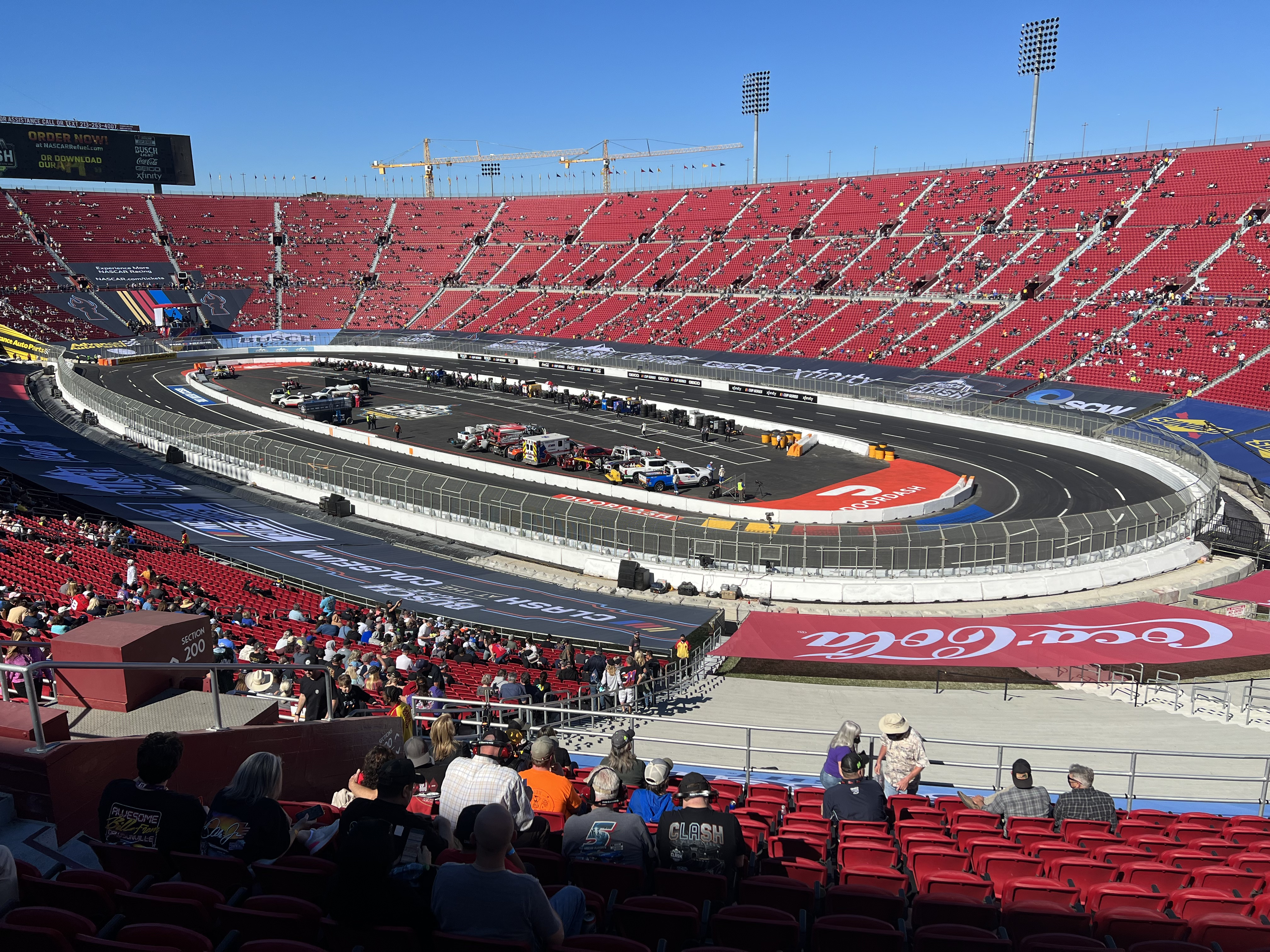
The temporary racetrack inside of the Los Angeles Memorial Coliseum on the day of the race

The 2022 season started with an exhibition race on a temporary 1/4 mile (0.40 km) track constructed at the Los Angeles Memorial Coliseum. Kyle Busch won the pole in qualifying, which set the lineup for the four heat races. The heat races, which determined 16 of the 23 drivers for the 150-lap feature, were won by Kyle Busch, Tyler Reddick, Justin Haley, and Joey Logano. The remaining drivers were placed into two last-chance qualifying races, which determined the remaining drivers who would make the field. Denny Hamlin and Ryan Preece won the last-chance qualifying races; Ty Dillon initially won the second race but was disqualified following a restart violation, which gave Preece the win. Martin Truex Jr. took the final spot in the feature with a provisional. Kyle Busch started on pole for the feature. The feature had multiple caution flags due to wrecks. Reddick led the early portion of the race before going to the garage with a broken prop shaft during a caution. Kyle Busch took over the lead and held the lead to the halftime break. After the race resumed, Kyle Busch continued to lead and led the most laps. Late in the race, Logano took the lead and went on to win the race.

==== Speedweeks 2022 ====
In Daytona 500 qualifying, Kyle Larson won the pole while teammate Alex Bowman qualified second.

In the Bluegreen Vacation Duel, Brad Keselowski won the first Duel in his first season with RFK Racing. In the second Duel, Joey Logano was leading late in the race until he wrecked on the last lap attempting to block Chris Buescher. Buescher won the second Duel, which ended under caution, resulting in RFK sweeping both Duel races.

==== Round 1: Daytona 500 ====
This was the first points race for the Next Gen car. Rookie Austin Cindric, the 2020 NASCAR Xfinity Series champion, won the race in only his eighth Cup Series start. He became the ninth driver to win his first Cup Series race in the Daytona 500. At age 23, Cindric also became the second-youngest driver in NASCAR history to win the Daytona 500 behind Trevor Bayne, who won the 2011 Daytona 500 the day after his 20th birthday. This was the third Daytona 500 win for Team Penske, who previously won the 2008 race with Ryan Newman and the 2015 race with Joey Logano. It was also the first Daytona 500 win for the team's flagship No. 2 car, as Newman drove the No. 12 and Logano drove the No. 22. Bubba Wallace, driving the No. 23 for 23XI Racing, finished second in the race for the second time after he first did so in 2018. Martin Truex Jr., driving the No. 19 for Joe Gibbs Racing, won both Stage 1 and Stage 2. Brad Keselowski, who Cindric replaced in the Team Penske No. 2, led the most laps in the race, which was his first points race driving the No. 6 car for the renamed RFK Racing of which he became a co-owner. This was the first Daytona 500 since 2019 to not be affected by rain.

==== Round 2: WISE Power 400 ====
Austin Cindric won the pole. Kyle Busch spun early as Tyler Reddick won the first stage. Brad Keselowski spun after contact with Joey Logano as Reddick won the second stage. Reddick got a flat tire while leading and got hit by William Byron. Keselowski again spun and collected Bubba Wallace. With 22 laps to go, leader Kyle Larson threw a late block on teammate Chase Elliott on the front stretch, resulting in Elliott making contact with the wall and later spinning, bringing out the final caution of the day. On the subsequent restart, Larson held off charges from Austin Dillon, Erik Jones, and Daniel Suárez for his second Cup win at Fontana.

==== Round 3: Pennzoil 400 ====
Christopher Bell was on pole position. On Lap 43, Austin Dillon tapped and spun Justin Haley, bringing out the 3rd caution. The first stage was won by Alex Bowman. In stage 2, Brad Keselowski spun on the main straight and damaged Ryan Blaney, who was furious. The pole sitter, Bell spun and punctured two tires. Stage 2 was won by Trackhouse Racing, who won their first stage at the hands of Ross Chastain. In stage 3 with 13 laps to go, Joe Gibbs Racing teammates Kyle Busch and Martin Truex Jr. battled for the lead. With 3 laps to go, Erik Jones hit the wall and went across the track, bringing out the caution. Bubba Wallace narrowly hit him, instead hitting the barriers in the infield. On the overtime restart, Alex Bowman took two tires and was side by side with his teammate Kyle Larson for the restart. They fought for two laps, with Bowman victorious. Ross Chastain led the most laps of the day, with 83 laps led; he finished third.

==== Round 4: Ruoff Mortgage 500 ====
Ryan Blaney won the pole. Corey LaJoie slammed into the wall after having a tire completely off the car. William Byron won the first stage. Christopher Bell got into the wall after a flat tire as Blaney won the second stage. Martin Truex Jr. slammed into the wall after having a flat tire. Erik Jones and Chase Elliott both caused cautions for spinning in two different incidents. On the restart, Chase Briscoe would hold off charges from Ross Chastain and Tyler Reddick to get his first career Cup Series victory and became the 200th different winner in Cup Series history.

==== Round 5: Folds of Honor QuikTrip 500 ====
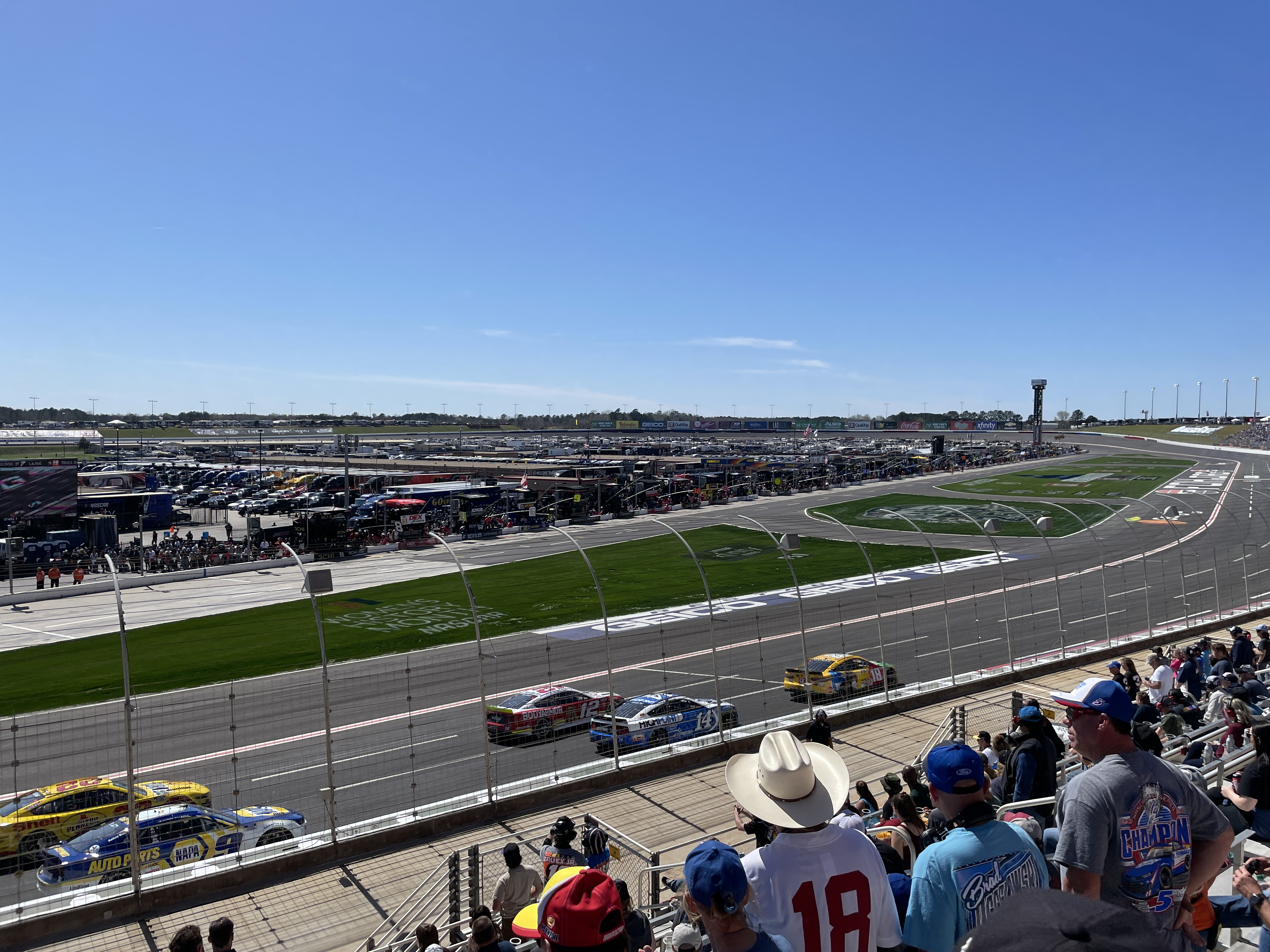
The Folds of Honor QuikTrip 500 at Atlanta Motor Speedway in March

Chase Briscoe was awarded the pole position after NASCAR decided to replace qualifying on Saturday with a practice session due to the practice session on Friday being cancelled due to rain. Briscoe scored highest using the pandemic metric score that is now used by NASCAR based on the previous race results and points.

The modified Atlanta Motor Speedway, now classified as a superspeedway after a reconfiguration in 2021, produced lots of action. The field ran two and three wide for most of the race. The changes were not well received by Kyle Busch, who on being asked whether he preferred the new version of Atlanta to the old one he just replied "no". He had a collision with Austin Dillon in Stage 1. There were lots of right rear punctures for many drivers, including Tyler Reddick and Ricky Stenhouse Jr. in stage 2, both triggering wrecks but most notably for Ross Chastain in stage 1, who also hit a wall after his puncture and had received a penalty for improper fuelling which left him several laps down. He still recovered to finish second. There were 46 lead changes among 20 drivers, both track records. William Byron won the race, his third career victory. Bubba Wallace and Chastain were also fighting for the victory in the last laps but Wallace and others had a wreck across the finish line. Christopher Bell was second on track but was classified last on the lead lap after an illegal overtake on Chastain. Chase Elliott finished sixth and became the Championship Leader at his home race.

==== Round 6: EchoPark Texas Grand Prix ====
Ryan Blaney won the pole even after a crash in Practice at NASCAR's first Road course race of the season. Daniel Suárez started in P2 after being fastest in Group B. Suárez won Stage 1, his second career stage victory as Kyle Busch faced mechanical issues. On the Stage 2 restart, Suárez was spun at the first corner and cut his tire, which lost him positions. His teammate Ross Chastain battled for the lead with Austin Cindric, the pair locked into a wheel to wheel battle. They both pitted on Lap 28, and Denny Hamlin won his first stage in 2022. At the restart, Joey Logano was the lead car but went deep into Turn 1, immediately losing the lead. Later, his teammate Cindric spun through the fast downhill left-hander, Turn 10 where his teammate Blaney spun during practice. Chastain returned to the lead pack battled with Chase Briscoe and other drivers for the lead. Bubba Wallace's lug nut came loose and he had to retire. Briscoe later dropped back with mechanical issues. Loris Hezemans stopped on track and retired, resulting in a restart with 3 laps to go. Logano, Kurt Busch and Kyle Larson made contact at the first corner on the restart, bringing out another caution. The race was restarted again in Overtime, and Chastain, Alex Bowman, Tyler Reddick and A. J. Allmendinger battled for the lead. On the final lap at Turn 15, Allmendinger pushed Chastain, briefly putting Bowman in the lead. Coming through Hayden Hill, Chastain pushed Allmendinger into Bowman. Allmendinger spun and finished 33rd. Chastain won the race from Bowman in second, giving Trackhouse Racing their first NASCAR Win. Chase Elliott finished fourth and kept the Championship lead.

==== Round 7: Toyota Owners 400 ====
Ryan Blaney started the race on the pole position and led the most laps in the race. Blaney won the first stage while Martin Truex Jr. won the second stage. William Byron was leading late in the race. During a round of late-race green-flag pit stops, several drivers came to pit road for fresh tires while Byron stayed out with older tires. Byron was passed for the lead by Denny Hamlin, who had pitted for tires, with five laps remaining. Hamlin pulled away to win the race, his first win and top ten of the season.

==== Round 8: Blue-Emu Maximum Pain Relief 400 ====
Chase Elliott was on pole for the race and led the first 185 laps, also winning both stages. During the race, Hendrick Motorsports surpassed leading 10,000 laps at Martinsville, becoming the first Cup team to lead that many laps at a single track. William Byron led 212 laps in the race. On lap 393, Todd Gilliland brushed the turn 4 wall, which sent the race to overtime. Byron held off Joey Logano to win the race, his second win of the season.

==== Round 9: Food City Dirt Race ====
Cole Custer won the pole position through the qualifying heat races. Chase Briscoe led early in the race until he spun from a flat tire. Kyle Larson won the first stage of the race. Briscoe came back to take the lead and won the second stage of the race. After the second stage was completed, the race was delayed due to rain. Once the race resumed, Tyler Reddick took the lead by passing both Kyle Busch and Joey Logano. The race was delayed a second time due to rain. Reddick continued to lead late in the race. In the closing laps, Briscoe started catching Reddick. On the final lap in the final turn, Briscoe made contact with Reddick, causing both cars to spin, Kyle Busch passed Reddick to win the race, his first win of the season and 60th of his career. He became the 9th driver to score his 60th Cup victory. This also marked the 18th consecutive season that Kyle Busch won a race, tying the record set by Richard Petty.

==== Round 10: GEICO 500 ====
Christopher Bell started the race from the pole position. The race had 41 lead changes among 16 drivers. Bubba Wallace won the first stage of the race. During a restart in the second stage, a multicar wreck occurred that involved Joey Logano, Daniel Suárez, Ty Dillon, and Harrison Burton. William Byron, who led the most laps in the race, won the second stage of the race. Erik Jones was leading late in the race. On the final lap, Kyle Larson attempted to pass Jones for the lead while Jones blocked Larson. Ross Chastain was able to pass both cars and win the race, his second win of the season. This was Greg Biffle's final NASCAR race before his death in a plane crash on December 18th, 2025.

==== Round 11: DuraMAX Drydene 400 ====
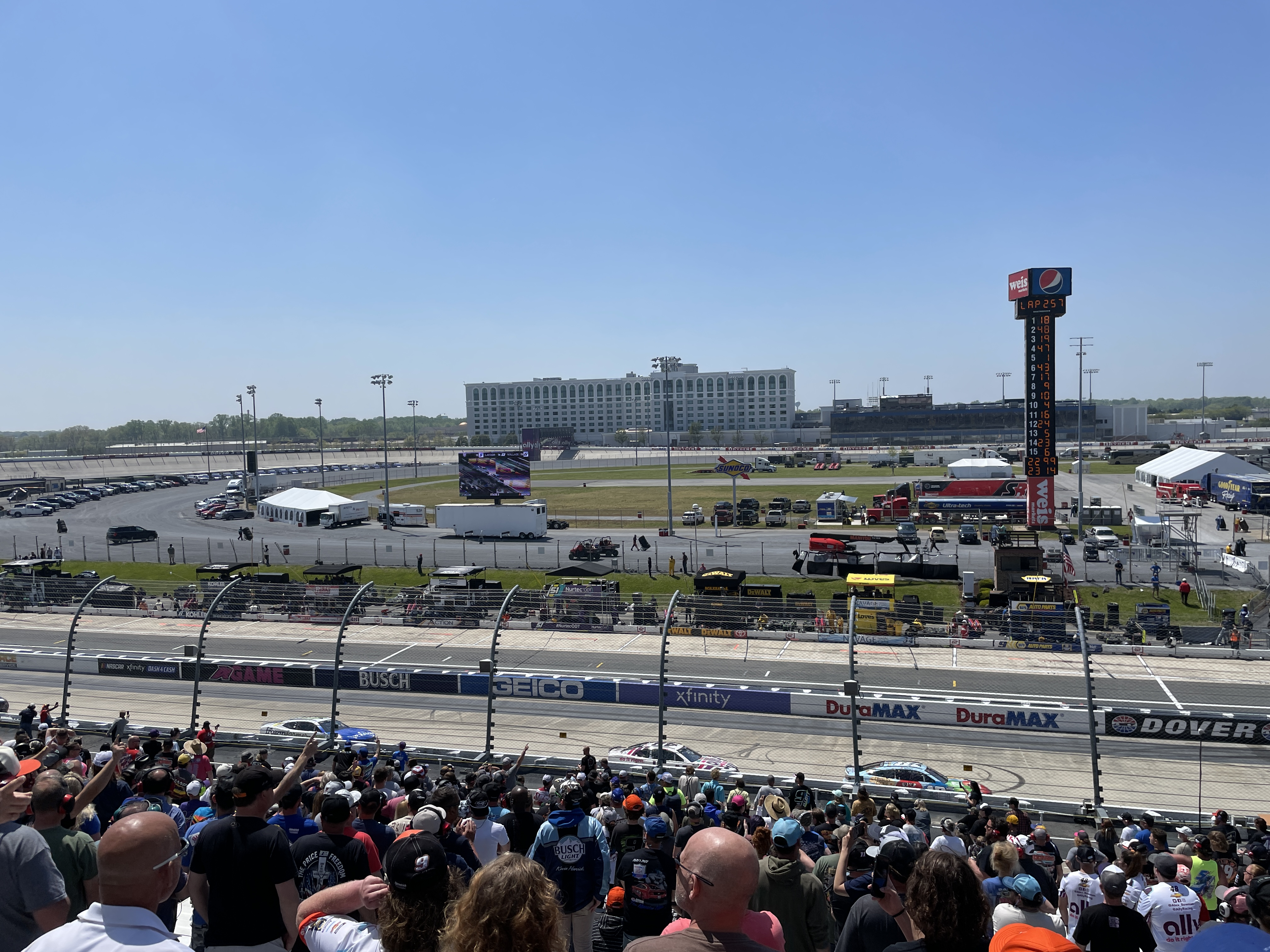
The DuraMAX Drydene 400 at Dover Motor Speedway in May

Chris Buescher was on pole for the race. The race started on Sunday and 78 laps were completed before rain forced the remainder of the race to be postponed until Monday. Denny Hamlin won the first stage of the race but had a tire come off his car as he was exiting pit road. In the second stage, Hamlin was collected in a wreck caused by Cody Ware spinning. Ryan Blaney won the second stage in the race. Kyle Busch led the most laps in the race. During a round of green-flag pit stops, Kyle Busch and second-place Alex Bowman were on pit road when a caution came out for A. J. Allmendinger losing a wheel, resulting in the two drivers restarting at the end of the lead lap. Chase Elliott led the final laps of the race and went on to score his first win of the season. On the final lap, Ross Chastain and Martin Truex Jr. made contact battling for third place, resulting in Truex Jr. spinning.

==== Round 12: Goodyear 400 ====
Joey Logano took the pole position for the race and won the first stage. Ross Chastain won Stage 2, but during the final stage, he lost control and hit the inside wall head-on, ending his day abruptly. Brad Keselowski blew a tire and collided with Kyle Busch. During the caution, Busch parked his car on pit road and walked away when its front suspension was too damaged to turn to the garage. During the closing laps, William Byron was in the lead, with Logano closely behind him. With two laps to go, Logano punted Byron to the outside wall, passing him to win the race.

==== Round 13: AdventHealth 400 ====
Christopher Bell won the pole position. Chase Briscoe spun on lap 6, bringing out the first caution. Many cars suffered punctures in the left-rear tire, including Daniel Suárez with 19 laps to go in Stage 1. The stage was eventually won by Kyle Busch. William Byron and Martin Truex Jr. also had left-rear punctures, the latter with two laps to go for the end of stage 2; which was won by Kurt Busch. In the final stage, Kurt Busch fought with Kyle Larson for the lead. With 86 laps to go, the pair were side by side and Larson slid; but kept his car from spinning out. Later, Chase Elliott also had a left rear puncture, bringing out the seventh caution. Larson and Kurt Busch continued to fight for the win, with Kurt Busch emerging as the eventual winner. Elliott retained the points lead.

==== Exhibition: NASCAR All-Star Race ====
Kyle Busch took the pole position. Ricky Stenhouse Jr., Chris Buescher, and Daniel Suárez qualified for the race by winning the three stages of the All-Star Open while Erik Jones won the fan vote. Busch won Stage 1. During the second stage, Kyle Larson blew a tire and hit the wall hard, resulting in a last-place finish. With three laps to go on the stage, Busch cut a tire and slowed down. With no chance of avoiding Busch, Ross Chastain clipped him from behind before going airborne and colliding with Chase Elliott. Following the restart, Austin Cindric won Stage 2 while Ryan Blaney won Stage 3. During the final lap, Blaney was over three seconds ahead of Denny Hamlin when Stenhouse brushed the wall, resulting in NASCAR declaring a caution right before Blaney crossed the finish line. The race restarted on overtime with Blaney winning the race and the cash prize of US$1 million. Following the race however, NASCAR faced criticism for calling the caution leading to the overtime, as well as allowing Blaney to race with an improperly installed window net in that period (Blaney had removed it to prepare for the celebrations as he crossed the finish line, only to be told about the Stenhouse crash afterwards).

==== Round 14: Coca-Cola 600 ====
Denny Hamlin won the pole position. On Lap 46, Daniel Suárez overtook Kyle Busch for the lead, and Kyle Busch spun. Bubba Wallace spun down the straightaway. Chase Elliott won the first stage, before spinning in a similar manner to Wallace in stage 2. With 9 laps to go in stage 2, Ryan Blaney spun, causing a multi car wreck. Suárez won the stage, and his teammate Ross Chastain won the next stage. In the final stage, Suárez tried to block Chase Briscoe but instead made contact with him, sending Suárez spinning. Chris Buescher couldn't avoid Suárez and broke his front right suspension, which resulted in the right front tire getting stuck under the car; that sent Buescher into a barrel roll, bringing out the red flag. He landed on his roof but was unhurt. Kyle Larson and Briscoe overtook Chastain, who led the most laps all day. Towards the end Briscoe closed up to Larson, overtook him and was re-overtaken. With 2 laps to go Briscoe tried again, but instead spun into Larson in turn 2, which triggered an overtime restart. In the restart, Austin Dillon, with four fresh tires, went four wide for the lead, but instead wrecked after contact with Larson; this triggered another multi car wreck and subsequent restart. On the final restart, Denny Hamlin had the inside from Chastain who dropped back because of damage. Hamlin won the race, holding off teammate Kyle Busch. The race was the longest in NASCAR history at 619.5 miles and taking 5 hours and 13 minutes.

==== Round 15: Enjoy Illinois 300 ====
Chase Briscoe got his first pole position of the season at the Cup Series' debut at the World Wide Technology Raceway. He got a puncture and had to pit. Austin Cindric won the first stage. In the next stage, Ross Chastain tried to bump his way past Denny Hamlin but instead put Hamlin in the wall instead. Ryan Blaney had a puncture with 46 laps to go which brought out the caution. On the restart Chastain spun Chase Elliott, sparking another feud. Simultaneously right behind Elliott, Bubba Wallace was spun round in a similar fashion by Harrison Burton. Elliott later also bumped Chastain in retaliation, with Chastain narrowly hitting the wall and Hamlin, right behind, also coming alongside Chastain and passing him. Hamlin held up and blocked Chastain for the next few laps. Ricky Stenhouse Jr. put Wallace in the wall while trying to bump past him. Hamlin saw it firsthand and expressed his displeasure; he also owns 23XI Racing- Wallace's team. Wallace's teammate Kurt Busch won the stage. In the final stage Kyle Busch and Joey Logano battled for the win, but a brake rotor failure on Kevin Harvick's car on lap 236 sent the race to overtime. In the overtime restart, Busch briefly went past Logano but went too wide at the next turn, giving Logano the lead, and eventually the victory.

==== Round 16: Toyota/Save Mart 350 ====
Kyle Larson won the pole for the season's second road course race, this time at Sonoma Raceway. He led his teammate Chase Elliott on the start. With 16 laps to go in Stage 1, Bubba Wallace's engine failed and he brought out the caution. Larson won the stage. In the next stage Ross Chastain spun by himself trying to overtake his teammate Daniel Suárez. On pit lane, Elliott's car was out of the designated pit box and mechanics worked on it, earning him a penalty which dropped him to last. Joey Logano won the second stage. In the final stage, with 49 laps to go, many cars were battling for position from 8th position downwards. Briefly two rows of cars were three-wide into Turn 11. Later, Tyler Reddick spun. On Lap 27, Larson's right-front tire came off, earning a four race suspension for crew chief Cliff Daniels and both the tire changer and the jack operator. Suárez, who dominated the last stage from the lead won the race, earning his first Cup Series win, and Trackhouse's third in its second season. He became the first Mexican born driver to win a race in the Cup Series and the fifth international driver to win a Cup Series race as well. Elsewhere, Hendrick Motorsports achieved the landmark of a 100,000 miles led in the Cup Series. Elliott remained in the championship lead from Chastain. Suárez' win put him on the positive side of the Playoffs standings, but with 12 winners and ten races remaining, only the top 16 race winners (wins, then points) are guaranteed a playoff position.

==== Round 17: Ally 400 ====
Denny Hamlin won the pole after qualifying was cancelled due to rain after the first round. Alex Bowman got into the wall and was unable to continue. After a several hour red flag due to rain and lightning, the race resumed as Martin Truex Jr. would sweep both stages. Chase Elliott took the lead and was able to hold off Kurt Busch for his second win of the season.

==== Round 18: Kwik Trip 250 ====
Chase Elliott won the pole. Eliott would dominate the race and lead the most laps, but didn't win either stage as they were won by Chase Briscoe and Ryan Blaney respectively. Several drivers had mechanical issues including Bubba Wallace and Austin Dillon. Tyler Reddick would pass Elliott to be able to become the leader after the final rounds of green flag pit stops. Reddick would pull away from Elliott to score his first career Cup Series victory.

==== Round 19: Quaker State 400 ====
Chase Elliott won the pole for the second week in a row after qualifying was cancelled due to rain. Elliott would lead the most laps and win both stages. Martin Truex Jr. spun after contact with Ross Chastain and collected Joey Logano, Kyle Busch, Michael McDowell, Kyle Larson, and Austin Dillon. Alex Bowman spun and got into the turn 2 wall coming to the end of the second stage. In the closing laps, Denny Hamlin spun after contact with Chastain and collected Brad Keselowski. On the restart, Corey LaJoie took the lead attempting to get his first career win, but Elliott took the lead with two laps to go. LaJoie attempted a last lap pass, but Elliott put on a block and put LaJoie into the wall and collected Kurt Busch as Elliott scored the win under caution for his third win of the season.

==== Round 20: Ambetter 301 ====
Martin Truex Jr. won the pole. Alex Bowman got into the wall after contact with Ty Dillon and collected Josh Bilicki. Corey LaJoie got into the wall after contact with Harrison Burton. Truex dominated and won both stages. Truex fell back as Chase Elliott took the lead after the final round of green flag pit stops. Christopher Bell took the lead from Elliott on lap 259 and pulled away to his second career win.

==== Round 21: M&M's Fan Appreciation 400 ====
Denny Hamlin won the pole. Ty Gibbs made his Cup Series debut as Kurt Busch was unable to race after Busch suffered a concussion in a turn 3 crash in practice. Austin Cindric spun early and a caution for Aric Almirola ended the first stage with Kyle Larson winning. Hamlin spun as Kyle Busch won the second stage. Ross Chastain took the lead from Busch after the final round of green flag pit stops and was pulling away until Ryan Blaney slammed hard into the wall. On the restart, Chastain got into the wall after battling Hamlin for the lead and collected Kevin Harvick. Hamlin was able to pull away from Busch to win the race, but both Hamlin and Busch failed post-race inspection and were disqualified and thus third-place Chase Elliott was awarded the win, his fourth of the season, making the first time in the Cup Series since 1960 that the winner was disqualified and stripped of the win. It also marked the first time in NASCAR history that the winner did not lead a single lap.

==== Round 22: Verizon 200 at the Brickyard ====
Tyler Reddick won the pole. Chase Briscoe won the first stage while Christopher Bell won the second stage. Kyle Larson hurtled out of control and into Ty Dillon in turn 1 on lap 62. Bell blew a tire, which brought out the caution. On the restart, Chase Elliott spun and collected William Byron, Erik Jones, Austin Dillon, Briscoe, Kyle Busch and Martin Truex Jr., which sent the race to overtime. Reddick would hold off Austin Cindric for his second win of the season.

Team Hezeberg teammates Daniil Kvyat from Russia and Loris Hezemans from the Netherlands became the first two international drivers to compete in a Cup Series race as teammates since Dario Franchitti from Scotland and Juan Pablo Montoya from Colombia were teammates at Chip Ganassi Racing in 2008.

==== Round 23: FireKeepers Casino 400 ====
Bubba Wallace won the first pole of his career. The race was delayed by just over an hour due to rain and lightning about 30 minutes before the race began. On the first restart, J. J. Yeley, who had not stopped unlike most of the field, got loose in turn 2 and spun in the middle of the field, collecting Kyle Busch, Aric Almirola, Harrison Burton, Austin Cindric, and Ricky Stenhouse Jr. Christopher Bell won the first stage while Denny Hamlin won the second stage. After the final round of green flag stops, Bell got into the wall after contact with Ross Chastain. Kevin Harvick pulled away on the restart and held off Wallace for his first win since Bristol in 2020, breaking a 65-race winless streak, the 2nd longest winless streak of his career, and also becoming the fifteenth different winner of the season, tying a series record.

==== Round 24: Federated Auto Parts 400 ====
Kyle Larson won the pole. Ross Chastain won the first stage while Joey Logano won the second stage. Kyle Busch spun after contact with Chastain and collected Erik Jones and Martin Truex Jr. Kevin Harvick took the lead from Logano and held off charges from Christopher Bell and Chris Buescher for his second consecutive win, and the 60th of his Cup career. With this win, Harvick became the 10th driver in history to win 60 or more career Cup Series races.

==== Round 25: Go Bowling at The Glen ====
This race featured drivers from seven countries, which made it the most in Cup Series history. In addition to the majority of drivers being from the United States and series full-time driver Daniel Suárez being from Mexico, road course ringers Daniil Kvyat from Russia, Loris Hezemans from the Netherlands, Kyle Tilley from England, Mike Rockenfeller from Germany and Kimi Räikkönen from Finland all entered this race; Kvyat and Hezemans were teammates for Team Hezeberg, Tilley drove for Live Fast Motorsports in the No.78, Rockenfeller drove Spire's No.77, and Raikkonen debuted Trackhouse Racing's PROJECT91 entry.

Chase Elliott won the pole. The race was red flagged early due to a lightning hold. Chase Briscoe won the first stage while Joey Logano won the second stage. Austin Dillon spun after contact with Ross Chastain and collected Kimi Räikkönen, who was making his NASCAR debut. Kyle Larson took the lead from Elliott on a late restart and held off A. J. Allmendinger for his second straight win at The Glen and his second win of the season. Elliott also clinched the regular season championship after this race.

==== Round 26: Coke Zero Sugar 400 ====
Kyle Larson was awarded the pole after qualifying was cancelled due to rain. The race was postponed from Saturday to Sunday due to rain. Larson exited the race early due to a blown engine. Christopher Bell made contact with Kevin Harvick and collected Ryan Blaney. Joey Logano won the first stage while Kyle Busch won the second stage. Michael McDowell made contact with Tyler Reddick and collected William Byron, Corey LaJoie, Ross Chastain, and Martin Truex Jr. Chase Briscoe got turned into the wall after contact with Alex Bowman. In the closing laps, Denny Hamlin got turned into the wall and collected most of the field including Kevin Harvick, Daniel Hemric, Chase Elliott, Justin Haley, Ty Dillon, Chris Buescher, Harrison Burton, and Ricky Stenhouse Jr. During the caution, the race was red flagged due to rain and lightning. When the race resumed, Austin Cindric took the lead, but Austin Dillon dumped Cindric out of the way and held off teammate Reddick for his fourth career win to advance to the playoffs while Blaney received the final spot, knocking Truex out. Also, Dillon's win made him the sixteenth different winner of the season.

=== Playoffs ===
==== Round 27: Cook Out Southern 500 ====
Joey Logano won the pole. Several playoff drivers had trouble during the entire race. Chase Elliott spun and collected Chase Briscoe, taking Elliott out of the race after the damaged vehicle policy clock expired. William Byron won the first stage, but suffered engine issues along with teammate Kyle Larson. Ross Chastain went several laps down due to several issues. Kyle Busch won the second stage. Kevin Harvick had a tire go down and the car caught fire. Non-playoff driver Martin Truex Jr. was leading when he lost power steering and had to go to the garage. While under caution due to an accident involving Cody Ware, Kyle Busch blew the engine after dominating most of the race. Erik Jones was able to pull away on the restart and hold off a charging Denny Hamlin for his third career win, his second Southern 500 win, and the first win for Petty GMS Motorsports. This was also the first win for the No. 43 car since the 2014 Coke Zero 400 and the number's overall 200th win.

==== Round 28: Hollywood Casino 400 ====
Tyler Reddick won the pole. Kevin Harvick got into the wall and broke the suspension, taking him out of the race. Reddick cut a tire and got into the wall while leading, taking him out of the race. Christopher Bell won the first stage. Ricky Stenhouse Jr. cut a tire and got into the wall while running second. On the restart, Corey LaJoie got into the wall along with Aric Almirola and Harrison Burton. Kyle Busch spun after both rear tires went flat. Alex Bowman won the second stage and led the most laps. Bowman pulled away in the final stage until Bubba Wallace took the lead and retained the lead after the final round of green flag pit stops and would hold off team owner Denny Hamlin for his second career win and first non-rain shortened win. Bell locked into the next round of the playoffs on points.

==== Round 29: Bass Pro Shops Night Race ====
Aric Almirola won the pole. RFK Racing teammates Brad Keselowski and Chris Buescher dominated the race along with Christopher Bell as Keselowski won the first stage and Bell won the second stage. The Toyota cars were suffering from power steering issues, including both 23XI cars. Like Darlington two races prior, Joe Gibbs Racing teammates Martin Truex Jr. and Kyle Busch were taken out of the race with power steering and blown engine respectively. Daniel Suárez lost control of his car, with fellow playoff drivers Austin Dillon and Tyler Reddick getting caught up with heavy damage. Both Keselowski and Bell blew tires while leading as Buescher held off Chase Elliott for his second career win and first non-rain shortened win. It was Buescher's first win in 222 races, the second longest drought between wins, the first win in 175 races for Jack Roush, the first win for Keselowski as an owner. Buescher also became the nineteenth different winner of the season, tying the modern-era record set in 2001. Dillon, Kevin Harvick, Reddick, and Kyle Busch were eliminated from the playoffs.

==== Round 30: Autotrader EchoPark Automotive 500 ====
Brad Keselowski won the pole. The race saw tire issues for Martin Truex Jr., Kevin Harvick and Chase Elliott- who retired after a small fire broke out in his engine bay, pushing him to be last above the cut line when the race ended. Christopher Bell also faced issues and dropped below the cut line. Kyle Larson won the first stage after Denny Hamlin made contact with his left rear quarter panel. Ryan Blaney, who won the All Star race earlier this year won Stage 2. Subsequently, there was a 56-minute red flag for rain. Later, William Byron and Hamlin made contact, which left Byron displeased. Byron then hit Hamlin on purpose under caution, sending Hamlin spinning. Tyler Reddick fought Joey Logano for the lead, with the former winning right after being eliminated from the previous round of the playoffs, and the latter earning the points lead. There were a record 36 lead changes and a record 16 caution periods. Byron (and Ty Gibbs, who hit Ty Dillon on the pit road) were later fined for their incidents. Byron was also initially penalized with a loss of 25 points, which dropped him from third to tenth in the standings, although it was later overturned. A string of tire failures also resulted in Alex Bowman suffering from a concussion that effectively eliminated him from the playoffs and Cody Ware sustaining an impaction fracture on his ankle after am hard hit into the pit wall.

==== Round 31: YellaWood 500 ====
Christopher Bell won the pole. Harrison Burton got turned and collected Austin Cindric, Joey Logano, Ty Gibbs, Ricky Stenhouse Jr., Noah Gragson (filling in for Alex Bowman who didn't race due to concussion-like symptoms), and Justin Allgaier. Corey LaJoie got into the wall with a flat tire. Ryan Blaney beat out Denny Hamlin to win the first stage while Chase Elliott won the second stage. The race went caution free until Daniel Hemric stalled on the track with engine issues with seven laps to go. On the restart, Elliott used a push from Erik Jones to pass Blaney on the final lap to win his second race at Talladega and his fifth win of the season to advance to the next round of the playoffs.

==== Round 32: Bank of America Roval 400 ====
Joey Logano won the pole. Logano won the first stage while Ross Chastain won the second stage. Tyler Reddick, A. J. Allmendinger, and Chase Elliott all led the race. Elliott was heading to the win until a caution came out for debris, ending the race to overtime. On the restart, Elliott spun from the lead with contact with Reddick and Allmendinger while Logano spun, bringing out the red flag for a dislodged curbing. On the restart Christopher Bell, who needed a win to advance, took the lead from Kevin Harvick and won his second race of the season and third of his career. Austin Cindric, Kyle Larson, Alex Bowman, and Daniel Suárez were eliminated from the playoffs.

==== Round 33: South Point 400 ====
Tyler Reddick won the pole. Kyle Busch spun with a flat tire as Bubba Wallace won the first stage. Wallace made contact with Kyle Larson and both spun and got into the wall also collecting Christopher Bell. Wallace then confronted Larson and shoved him several times. Ryan Blaney won the second stage, but would get in the wall and spin while battling for the lead. Kyle Busch would have more tire issues as a tire came off after a pit stop. Daniel Suárez spun while battling teammate Ross Chastain for position. On the restart, Chastain pulled away from the field until Joey Logano caught and passed Chastain with three laps to go and Logano won the race to advance to the Championship 4 in Phoenix.

==== Round 34: Dixie Vodka 400 ====
William Byron won the pole. John Hunter Nemechek, filling in for the suspended Bubba Wallace, spun early. Kyle Larson dominated and won both stages. Chase Briscoe got into the wall, receiving heavy damage while Ryan Blaney spun. Martin Truex Jr. led into the closing laps but a caution came out for Tyler Reddick getting into the wall, sending the leaders to pit road Truex spun on pit road after contact with Larson. Larson came off pit road first and held off charges from Ross Chastain and A. J. Allmendinger for his third win of the season.

==== Round 35: Xfinity 500 ====
Kyle Larson won the pole. Denny Hamlin dominated and won both stages. Kyle Busch had tire issues and fell several laps down. Tyler Reddick exited the race early due to him not feeling well. Austin Dillon slammed hard into the wall after brake issues. Chase Briscoe, needing a win to advance, stayed off pit road and pulled away from the field until Christopher Bell, who also needed to win to advance, passed Briscoe for the lead and held off pole sitter Larson to win the race and advance to the Championship 4 in Phoenix joining Joey Logano. Chase Elliott made it in on points as well as Ross Chastain, who rode along the wall to go from 10th to 5th in the final corner on the final lap to beat out Hamlin for the final spot while Hamlin, Briscoe, Ryan Blaney, and William Byron were eliminated. Brad Keselowski scored his best finish of the year of 4th, but failed post-race inspection and was credited with last place.

==== Round 36: NASCAR Cup Series Championship Race ====
Joey Logano won the pole. Logano won the first stage while Ryan Blaney won the second stage. Chase Elliott spun and got into the wall after contact with Ross Chastain. Brad Keselowski got a flat tire and the car caught fire. Logano took the lead from spring winner Chase Briscoe and held off Blaney to win the race and become the 2022 NASCAR Cup Series Champion.

== Results and standings ==
=== Race results ===
No.	Race	Pole position	Most laps led	Winning driver	Manufacturer	Report
	Busch Light Clash at The Coliseum	Kyle Busch	Kyle Busch	Joey Logano	Ford	Report
	Bluegreen Vacations Duel 1	Kyle Larson	Kyle Larson	Brad Keselowski	Ford	Report
	Bluegreen Vacations Duel 2	Alex Bowman	Joey Logano	Chris Buescher	Ford	Report
1	Daytona 500	Kyle Larson	Brad Keselowski	Austin Cindric	Ford	Report
2	WISE Power 400	Austin Cindric	Tyler Reddick	Kyle Larson	Chevrolet	Report
3	Pennzoil 400	Christopher Bell	Ross Chastain	Alex Bowman	Chevrolet	Report
4	Ruoff Mortgage 500	Ryan Blaney	Ryan Blaney	Chase Briscoe	Ford	Report
5	Folds of Honor QuikTrip 500	Chase Briscoe	William Byron	William Byron	Chevrolet	Report
6	EchoPark Texas Grand Prix	Ryan Blaney	Ross Chastain	Ross Chastain	Chevrolet	Report
7	Toyota Owners 400	Ryan Blaney	Ryan Blaney	Denny Hamlin	Toyota	Report
8	Blue-Emu Maximum Pain Relief 400	Chase Elliott	William Byron	William Byron	Chevrolet	Report
9	Food City Dirt Race	Cole Custer	Tyler Reddick	Kyle Busch	Toyota	Report
10	GEICO 500	Christopher Bell	William Byron	Ross Chastain	Chevrolet	Report
11	DuraMAX Drydene 400	Chris Buescher	Kyle Busch	Chase Elliott	Chevrolet	Report
12	Goodyear 400	Joey Logano	Joey Logano	Joey Logano	Ford	Report
13	AdventHealth 400	Christopher Bell	Kurt Busch	Kurt Busch	Toyota	Report
	NASCAR All Star Open	Tyler Reddick	Ricky Stenhouse Jr.	Daniel Suárez	Chevrolet	Report
	NASCAR All-Star Race	Kyle Busch	Ryan Blaney	Ryan Blaney	Ford	Report
14	Coca-Cola 600	Denny Hamlin	Ross Chastain	Denny Hamlin	Toyota	Report
15	Enjoy Illinois 300	Chase Briscoe	Kyle Busch	Joey Logano	Ford	Report
16	Toyota/Save Mart 350	Kyle Larson	Daniel Suárez	Daniel Suárez	Chevrolet	Report
17	Ally 400	Denny Hamlin	Denny Hamlin	Chase Elliott	Chevrolet	Report
18	Kwik Trip 250	Chase Elliott	Chase Elliott	Tyler Reddick	Chevrolet	Report
19	Quaker State 400	Chase Elliott	Chase Elliott	Chase Elliott	Chevrolet	Report
20	Ambetter 301	Martin Truex Jr.	Martin Truex Jr.	Christopher Bell	Toyota	Report
21	M&M's Fan Appreciation 400	Denny Hamlin	Kyle Busch	Chase Elliott (Note: Chase Elliott unofficially finished 3rd, but he was credited the win after the cars of Denny Hamlin and Kyle Busch were disqualified after the post-race inspection.)	Chevrolet	Report
22	Verizon 200 at the Brickyard	Tyler Reddick	Tyler Reddick	Tyler Reddick	Chevrolet	Report
23	FireKeepers Casino 400	Bubba Wallace	Denny Hamlin; Kevin Harvick (Note: Hamlin and Harvick both led 38 laps.)	Kevin Harvick	Ford	Report
24	Federated Auto Parts 400	Kyle Larson	Joey Logano	Kevin Harvick	Ford	Report
25	Go Bowling at The Glen	Chase Elliott	Chase Elliott	Kyle Larson	Chevrolet	Report
26	Coke Zero Sugar 400	Kyle Larson	Chase Elliott	Austin Dillon	Chevrolet	Report
NASCAR Cup Series Playoffs
Round of 16
27	Cook Out Southern 500	Joey Logano	Kyle Busch	Erik Jones	Chevrolet	Report
28	Hollywood Casino 400	Tyler Reddick	Alex Bowman	Bubba Wallace	Toyota	Report
29	Bass Pro Shops Night Race	Aric Almirola	Chris Buescher	Chris Buescher	Ford	Report
Round of 12
30	Autotrader EchoPark Automotive 500	Brad Keselowski	Tyler Reddick	Tyler Reddick	Chevrolet	Report
31	YellaWood 500	Christopher Bell	Aric Almirola; Ross Chastain (Note: Almirola and Chastain both led 36 laps.)	Chase Elliott	Chevrolet	Report
32	Bank of America Roval 400	Joey Logano	Chase Elliott	Christopher Bell	Toyota	Report
Round of 8
33	South Point 400	Tyler Reddick	Ross Chastain	Joey Logano	Ford	Report
34	Dixie Vodka 400	William Byron	Kyle Larson	Kyle Larson	Chevrolet	Report
35	Xfinity 500	Kyle Larson	Denny Hamlin	Christopher Bell	Toyota	Report
Championship 4
36	NASCAR Cup Series Championship Race	Joey Logano	Joey Logano	Joey Logano	Ford	Report

=== Drivers' championship ===
(key) Bold – Pole position awarded by time. Italics – Pole position set by competition-based formula. * – Most laps led. ^{1} – Stage 1 winner. ^{2} – Stage 2 winner. ^{3} – Stage 3 winner. (Note: Stage 3 Winner only for Coca-Cola 600 and Daytona 500 qualifying race, but no playoff point at Daytona)^{1–10} - Regular season top 10 finishers.
. – Eliminated after Round of 16 . – Eliminated after Round of 12 . – Eliminated after Round of 8

Pos.	Driver	DAY	CAL	LVS	PHO	ATL	COA	RCH	MAR	BRD	TAL	DOV	DAR	KAN	CLT	GTW	SON	NSH	ROA	ATL	NHA	POC	IRC	MCH	RCH	GLN	DAY	DAR	KAN	BRI	TEX	TAL	ROV	LVS	HOM	MAR	PHO	Pts.	Stage	Bonus
1	Joey Logano	21	5	14	8	9	31	17	2	3	32	29	**1***^{1}	17	20	1	17^{2}	9	27	26	24	20	6	4	6*^{2}	3^{2}	12^{1}	**4**	17	27	2	27	**18**^{1}	1	18	6	**1***^{1}	5040	–	26^{2}
2	Ross Chastain	40	29	3*^{2}	2	2	1*	19	5	33	1	3	30^{2}	7	15*^{3}	8	7	5	4	2	8	32^{2}	27	24	18^{1}	21	33	20	7	6	13	4*	37^{2}	2*	2	4	3	5034	–	21^{6}
3	Christopher Bell	34	36	**10**	26	23	3	6	20	7	**22**	4	6	**5**	5	9	27	8	18	19	1	4	12^{2}	26^{1}	2	8	36	5	3^{1}	4^{2}	34	**17**	1	34	11	1	10	5027	–	18^{7}
4	Chase Elliott	10	26	9	11	6	4	14	**10**^{12}	8	7	1	5	29	33^{1}	21	8	1	**2***	1*^{12}	2	1	16	11	5	**4***	29*	36	11	2	32	1^{2}	20*	21	14	10	28	5009	–	46^{1}
NASCAR Cup Series Playoffs cut-off
Pos.	Driver	DAY	CAL	LVS	PHO	ATL	COA	RCH	MAR	BRD	TAL	DOV	DAR	KAN	CLT	GTW	SON	NSH	ROA	ATL	NHA	POC	IRC	MCH	RCH	GLN	DAY	DAR	KAN	BRI	TEX	TAL	ROV	LVS	HOM	MAR	PHO	Pts.	Stage	Bonus
5	Denny Hamlin	37	15	32	13	29	18^{2}	1	28	35	18	21^{1}	21	4	**1**	34	31	**6***	17	25	6	**35**	14	3*^{2}	4	20	25	2	2	9	10	5	13	5	7	5*^{12}	8	2379	27	13
6	William Byron	38	34	5	18^{1}	1*^{1}	12	3	1*	18	15*^{2}	22	13	16	32	19	9	35	16	30	11	12	31	12	11	22	34	8^{1}	6	3	7	12	16	13	**12**	7	6	2378	31	15^{10}
7	Kyle Larson	**32**	1	2	34	30	29	5	19	4^{1}	4	6	36	2	9	12	**15**^{1}	4	3	13	14	5^{1}	35	7	**14**	1	37	12	8	5	9^{1}	18	35	35	1*^{12}	**2**	9	2354	83	20^{5}
8	Ryan Blaney	4	18	36	**4***^{2}	17^{2}	**6**	**7***^{1}	4	5	11	26^{2}	17	12	29	4	6	3	11^{2}	5	18	33	26	5	10	24	15	13	9	30	4^{2}	2^{1}	26	28^{2}	17	3	2^{2}	2354	53	15^{3}
9	Chase Briscoe	3	16	35	1	15	30	11	9	22^{2}	37	13	20	24	4	**24**	13	34	14^{1}	16	15	15	23^{1}	20	23	25^{1}	31	27	13	14	5	10	9	4	36	9	4	2292	21	9
10	Daniel Suárez	18	4	37	9	4	24^{1}	16	29	12	31	14	10	33	25^{2}	23	1*	15	5	6	9	3	28	25	19	5	24	18	10	19	12	8	36	16	10	12	24	2272	57	7
11	Austin Dillon	25	2	11	21	35	10	10	3	31	2	23	9	13	22	15	11	14	31	35	23	10	30	13	16	17	1	17	14	31	17	13	10	10	4	33	13	2228	15	5
12	Austin Cindric **(R)**	1	**12**	19	24	32	8	20	11	16	21	36	18	11	34	11^{1}	5	7	7	3	13	31	2	37	12	13	3	16	12	20	15	9	21	29	19	26	11	2226	28	6
13	Kyle Busch	6	14	4	7	33	28	9	7	1	3	7*	33	3^{1}	2	2*	30	21	29	20	12	36*	11	36	9	32	10^{2}	30*^{2}	26	34	36	20	3	3	9	29	7	2224	41	11^{8}
14	Tyler Reddick	35	24*^{12}	7	3	28	5	12	18	2*	39	30	2	30	6	16	35	18	1	29	21	2	**1***	29	31	7	2	3	**35**	25	1*	28	8	**6**	35	35	23	2215	22	17
15	Kevin Harvick	30	7	12	6	21	11	2	14	34	10	9	4	15	3	33	4	10	10	12	5	27	33	1*	1	12	20	33	36	10	19	29	2	12	8	16	5	2126	14	12^{9}
16	Alex Bowman	24	25	1^{1}	14	10	2	8	12	6	9	5	29	9	10	13	16	36	12	32	35	11	32	9	20	14	14	10	4*^{2}	32	29						34	2107	–	7
17	Martin Truex Jr.	13^{12}	13	8	35	8	7	4^{2}	22	21	5	12	24	6	12	6	26	22^{12}	13	11	**4***^{12}	7	21	6	7	23	8	31	5	36	31	26	17	7	6	20	15	1037	238	14^{4}
18	Erik Jones	29	3	31	25	14	9	23	13	24	6	10	25	32	14	7	22	11	26	4	19	9	15	8	35	10	17	1	29	21	6	6	11	8	30	18	14	831	110	5
19	Bubba Wallace	2	19	25	22	13	38	26	16	28	17^{1}	16	27	10	28	26	36	12	35	14	3	8	5	**2**	13	35	11	9	1	29	25	16	7	36^{1}		8	22	764	99	6
20	Aric Almirola	5	6	6	12	22	19	21	8	23	13	19	11	26	17	5	14	17	28	8	31	13	38	34	8	29	21	11	21	**28**	24	14*	15	18	21	15	20	760	67	–
21	Chris Buescher	16	35	18	10	7	21	15	15	15	38	**8**	16	27	26		2	30	6	33	17	29	10	16	3	9	27	26	15	1*	30	25	6	15	13	24	21	727	41	5
22	Justin Haley	23	23	17	17	11	15	29	31	14	12	11	3	35	27	14	12	23	24	7	20	21	19	17	21	18	28	19	19	12	3	15	5	14	28	27	27	699	28	–
23	Michael McDowell	7	31	27	27	24	13	30	25	9	8	17	7	23	8	18	3	13	8	15	28	6	8	28	29	6	32	6	16	11	11	3	27	19	16	17	25	663	23	-10
24	Brad Keselowski	9*	27	24	23	12	14	13	17	11	23	20	34	14	30	20	10	29	33	18	7	14	20	15	15	19	35	7	25	13^{1}	**8**	24	14	17	5	36	35	629	77	-9
25	Cole Custer	20	11	33	16	34	23	22	21	**13**	29	15	26	22	21	29	21	26	15	9	27	17	9	31	26	11	16	14	22	8	35	21	24	20	24	14	16	589	48	–
26	Ricky Stenhouse Jr.	28	10	21	28	31	37	28	27	29	30	2	8	8	7	32	25	16	19	31	22	18	13	33	22	15	22	35	30	33	27	22	19	23	15	21	32	580	64	–
27	Harrison Burton **(R)**	39	33	16	29	25	17	18	26	20	34	24	14	21	11	25	28	25	22	10	25	23	3	32	25	28	19	21	32	16	18	36	28	26	20	11	19	573	50	–
28	Todd Gilliland **(R)**	33	20	23	19	27	16	25	30	17	27	28	15	25	16	22	24	24	25	17	26	25	4	27	27	38	23	28	23	18	28	7	30	25	31	13	29	531	31	–
29	Ty Dillon	11	17	20	15	36	20	24	23	10	33	27	12	20	13	27	23	31	20	28	33	22	34	14	17	16	18	22	20	26	16	23	25	33	26	31	26	518	33	–
30	Kurt Busch	19	8	13	5	3	32	35	6	32	16	31	28	1*^{2}	31	3^{2}	18	2	23	22	10	QL^{†}																485	77	7
31	Corey LaJoie	14	28	15	36	5	36	31	32	19	14	18	35	19	35	36	34	20	34	21	32	19	18	19	28	27	30	24	33	15	14	35	12	24	23	21	18	466	8	–
32	Cody Ware	17	32	26	31	26	27	36	33	26	28	34	19	34	18	35	32	27	32	23	30	26	24	22	34	34	6	32	27	17	33	32		27	34	28	30	305	2	–
33	David Ragan	8				18					24																9											89	–	–
34	Joey Hand						35										20		21				29			31							38					64	14	–
35	Greg Biffle	36^{‡}		34		20		37			35																											24	–	–
36	Jacques Villeneuve	22																																				15	–	–
37	Mike Rockenfeller																									30							29					15	–	–
38	Boris Said						26																															11	–	–
39	Kyle Tilley																		30							39												8	–	–
40	Conor Daly																																34					3	–	–
41	Kimi Räikkönen																									37												1	–	–
Ineligible for driver points
Pos.	Driver	DAY	CAL	LVS	PHO	ATL	COA	RCH	MAR	BRD	TAL	DOV	DAR	KAN	CLT	GTW	SON	NSH	ROA	ATL	NHA	POC	IRC	MCH	RCH	GLN	DAY	DAR	KAN	BRI	TEX	TAL	ROV	LVS	HOM	MAR	PHO	Pts.	Stage	Bonus
	A. J. Allmendinger				20		33	27	24			33				10	19	19	9		16		7			2				7			4	9	3	23	12			
	Landon Cassill	15			30			32			19		22							24					30		4	25	24	22	22	11		32	29	32	36			
	Noah Gragson	31				37				27	20			18	24					34		24		30	24		5		18		21	19	23	11	25	25				
	B. J. McLeod	27	22	28	33	19		34	36		26	35	32	36	19	30		32		36	36	30		23	33		7	29	31	24	26	33		30	33	34	31			
	Daniel Hemric	12	9	22							36		31														26	23				34					17			
	Ty Gibbs																					16	17	10	36	26	13	15	34	35	20	37	22	22	22	19	QL^{¶}			
	Josh Bilicki		30	29		16	22		35			32		28	36	28	29	33	36		34	34	22	21																
	Zane Smith															17																								
	Austin Hill																							18																
	Garrett Smithley		21	30	32															27											23						33			
	J. J. Yeley	DNQ						33	34	30	25		23	31				28			29	28		35	32			34	28	23		31	32	31	32	30				
	Kaz Grala	26					25								23																									
	Josh Williams									25													25										31							
	Ryan Preece											25			37																									
	John Hunter Nemechek																																		27					
	Justin Allgaier									36																						30								
	Parker Kligerman															31																								
	Loris Hezemans						34												37				37			33							33							
	Scott Heckert																33																							
	Daniil Kvyat																						36			36							39							
	Andy Lally						39																																	
	Timmy Hill	DNQ																																						
	Ben Rhodes															QL																								
Pos.	Driver	DAY	CAL	LVS	PHO	ATL	COA	RCH	MAR	BRD	TAL	DOV	DAR	KAN	CLT	GTW	SON	NSH	ROA	ATL	NHA	POC	IRC	MCH	RCH	GLN	DAY	DAR	KAN	BRI	TEX	TAL	ROV	LVS	HOM	MAR	PHO	Pts.	Stage	Bonus
^{†} – Kurt Busch originally qualified for the race, but was not cleared to race after a crash in the final round of qualifying, and was replaced by Ty Gibbs.^{‡} – Greg Biffle started receiving points at Las Vegas in March.^{¶} – Ty Gibbs originally qualified for the race, but would not compete due to a family emergency and was replaced by Daniel Hemric.

=== Manufacturers' championship ===
Pos	Manufacturer	Wins	Points
1	Chevrolet	19	1324
2	Ford	9	1250
3	Toyota	8	1188

== See also ==
- 2022 NASCAR Xfinity Series
- 2022 NASCAR Camping World Truck Series
- 2022 ARCA Menards Series
- 2022 ARCA Menards Series East
- 2022 ARCA Menards Series West
- 2022 NASCAR Whelen Modified Tour
- 2022 NASCAR Pinty's Series
- 2022 NASCAR Mexico Series
- 2022 NASCAR Whelen Euro Series
- 2022 CARS Tour
- 2022 SMART Modified Tour
