= 2022 Bluegreen Vacations Duels =

NASCAR Bluegreen Vacations Duels

Race details
- Date: February 17, 2022
- Location: Daytona International Speedway; Daytona Beach, Florida
- Course: Permanent racing facility 2.5 mi (4 km)
- Distance: Race 1: 60 laps, 150 mi (240 km); Race 2: 60 laps, 150 mi (240 km)
- Avg Speed: Race 1: 185.185 miles per hour (298.026 km/h); Race 2: 185.98 miles per hour (299.31 km/h)

Race 1
- Pole position: Kyle Larson
- Most laps led: Kyle Larson (35)
- Winner: Brad Keselowski

Race 2
- Pole position: Alex Bowman
- Most laps led: Joey Logano (33)
- Winner: Chris Buescher

Television
- Network: FS1 & MRN
- Announcers: Mike Joy, Clint Bowyer, and Larry McReynolds (Television); Alex Hayden, Jeff Striegle, and Rusty Wallace (Booth); Dave Moody (1 & 2), Mike Bagley (Backstretch), and Kyle Rickey (3 & 4) (Turns) (Radio)

The 2022 Bluegreen Vacations Duels were a pair of NASCAR Cup Series stock car races held on February 17, 2022, at Daytona International Speedway in Daytona Beach, Florida. Both contested over 60 laps, they were the qualifying races for the 2022 Daytona 500.

== Report ==
=== Background ===
Daytona International Speedway, where the races were held.

Daytona International Speedway is one of six superspeedways to hold NASCAR races, the others being Michigan International Speedway, Auto Club Speedway, Indianapolis Motor Speedway, Pocono Raceway and Talladega Superspeedway. The standard track at Daytona International Speedway is a four–turn superspeedway that is 2.5-mile (4.0 km) long. The track's turns are banked at 31 degrees, while the front stretch, the location of the finish line, is banked at 18 degrees.

== Qualifying ==
Kyle Larson scored the pole for the race with a time of 49.680 and a speed of 181.159 mph (291.547 km/h).

=== Qualifying results ===
Pos	No.	Driver	Team	Manufacturer	R1	R2
1	5	Kyle Larson	Hendrick Motorsports	Chevrolet	49.789	49.680
2	48	Alex Bowman	Hendrick Motorsports	Chevrolet	49.870	49.711
3	24	William Byron	Hendrick Motorsports	Chevrolet	49.765	49.765
4	10	Aric Almirola	Stewart-Haas Racing	Ford	49.946	49.854
5	9	Chase Elliott	Hendrick Motorsports	Chevrolet	49.927	49.913
6	19	Martin Truex Jr.	Joe Gibbs Racing	Toyota	50.078	49.989
7	1	Ross Chastain	Trackhouse Racing Team	Chevrolet	50.051	50.043
8	11	Denny Hamlin	Joe Gibbs Racing	Toyota	50.152	50.077
9	99	Daniel Suárez	Trackhouse Racing Team	Chevrolet	50.157	50.106
10	21	Harrison Burton (R)	Wood Brothers Racing	Ford	50.139	50.137
11	16	Daniel Hemric (i)	Kaulig Racing	Chevrolet	50.159	—
12	22	Joey Logano	Team Penske	Ford	50.160	—
13	12	Ryan Blaney	Team Penske	Ford	50.162	—
14	20	Christopher Bell	Joe Gibbs Racing	Toyota	50.187	—
15	8	Tyler Reddick	Richard Childress Racing	Chevrolet	50.191	—
16	23	Bubba Wallace	23XI Racing	Toyota	50.196	—
17	6	Brad Keselowski	RFK Racing	Ford	50.196	—
18	18	Kyle Busch	Joe Gibbs Racing	Toyota	50.202	—
19	14	Chase Briscoe	Stewart-Haas Racing	Ford	50.203	—
20	3	Austin Dillon	Richard Childress Racing	Chevrolet	50.204	—
21	2	Austin Cindric (R)	Team Penske	Ford	50.205	—
22	34	Michael McDowell	Front Row Motorsports	Ford	50.209	—
23	43	Erik Jones	Petty GMS Motorsports	Chevrolet	50.218	—
24	42	Ty Dillon	Petty GMS Motorsports	Chevrolet	50.225	—
25	45	Kurt Busch	23XI Racing	Toyota	50.285	—
26	4	Kevin Harvick	Stewart-Haas Racing	Ford	50.312	—
27	31	Justin Haley	Kaulig Racing	Chevrolet	50.315	—
28	17	Chris Buescher	RFK Racing	Ford	50.378	—
29	41	Cole Custer	Stewart-Haas Racing	Ford	50.539	—
30	7	Corey LaJoie	Spire Motorsports	Chevrolet	50.550	—
31	38	Todd Gilliland (R)	Front Row Motorsports	Ford	50.559	—
32	47	Ricky Stenhouse Jr.	JTG Daugherty Racing	Chevrolet	50.639	—
33	62	Noah Gragson (i)	Beard Motorsports	Chevrolet	50.689	—
34	77	Landon Cassill (i)	Spire Motorsports	Chevrolet	50.884	—
35	51	Cody Ware	Rick Ware Racing	Ford	50.928	—
36	27	Jacques Villeneuve	Team Hezeberg Powered by Reaume Brothers Racing	Ford	51.010	—
37	50	Kaz Grala (i)	The Money Team Racing	Chevrolet	51.094	—
38	44	Greg Biffle (i)	NY Racing Team	Chevrolet	51.100	—
39	78	B. J. McLeod	Live Fast Motorsports	Ford	51.153	—
40	15	David Ragan	Rick Ware Racing	Ford	51.216	—
41	55	J. J. Yeley (i)	MBM Motorsports	Ford	52.005	—
42	66	Timmy Hill (i)	MBM Motorsports	Ford	52.263	—
Official qualifying results

== Duels ==
=== Duel 1 ===
Mainly uneventful, Kyle Larson led through lap 34, when the Fords took charge after green flag stops, leading the remainder of the event. With inside of five to go, Brad Keselowski took the lead from Ryan Blaney and went on to win. Kaz Grala made a final lap pass on J.J. Yeley to make the Daytona 500.

==== Duel 1 results ====
Pos	Grid	No	Driver	Team	Manufacturer	Laps	Points
1	9	6	Brad Keselowski	RFK Racing	Ford	60	10
2	11	2	Austin Cindric (R)	Team Penske	Ford	60	9
3	7	12	Ryan Blaney	Team Penske	Ford	60	8
4	10	14	Chase Briscoe	Stewart-Haas Racing	Ford	60	7
5	3	9	Chase Elliott	Hendrick Motorsports	Chevrolet	60	6
6	12	43	Erik Jones	Petty GMS Motorsports	Chevrolet	60	5
7	1	5	Kyle Larson	Hendrick Motorsports	Chevrolet	60	4
8	8	8	Tyler Reddick	Richard Childress Racing	Chevrolet	60	3
9	13	45	Kurt Busch	23XI Racing	Toyota	60	2
10	4	1	Ross Chastain	Trackhouse Racing Team	Chevrolet	60	1
11	5	99	Daniel Suárez	Trackhouse Racing Team	Chevrolet	60	0
12	2	24	William Byron	Hendrick Motorsports	Chevrolet	60	0
13	14	31	Justin Haley	Kaulig Racing	Chevrolet	60	0
14	18	77	Landon Cassill (i)	Spire Motorsports	Chevrolet	60	0
15	16	38	Todd Gilliland (R)	Front Row Motorsports	Ford	60	0
16	15	41	Cole Custer	Stewart-Haas Racing	Ford	59	0
17	6	16	Daniel Hemric (i)	Kaulig Racing	Chevrolet	59	0
18	19	50	Kaz Grala (i)	The Money Team Racing	Chevrolet	58	0
19	21	55	J. J. Yeley (i)	MBM Motorsports	Ford	58	0
20	20	78	B. J. McLeod	Live Fast Motorsports	Ford	58	0
21	17	62	Noah Gragson (i)	Beard Motorsports	Chevrolet	57	0
Official race results

=== Duel 2 ===
Also somewhat uneventful, Denny Hamlin spun on pit road while trying to make a green-flag pit stop on lap 27. On the final lap, Joey Logano tried to made a block on the inside on Chris Buescher, but spun himself out and collected Harrison Burton. The only caution of either duel was displayed and Chris Buescher took the win over Michael McDowell, with RFK Racing sweeping the duels. Greg Biffle made the Daytona 500 over Timmy Hill.

==== Duel 2 results ====
Pos	Grid	No	Driver	Team	Manufacturer	Laps	Points
1	14	17	Chris Buescher	RFK Racing	Ford	60	10
2	11	34	Michael McDowell	Front Row Motorsports	Ford	60	9
3	5	21	Harrison Burton (R)	Wood Brothers Racing	Ford	60	8
4	9	18	Kyle Busch	Joe Gibbs Racing	Toyota	60	7
5	7	20	Christopher Bell	Joe Gibbs Racing	Toyota	60	6
6	3	19	Martin Truex Jr.	Joe Gibbs Racing	Toyota	60	5
7	8	23	Bubba Wallace	23XI Racing	Toyota	60	4
8	16	47	Ricky Stenhouse Jr.	JTG Daugherty Racing	Chevrolet	60	3
9	6	22	Joey Logano	Team Penske	Ford	59	2
10	13	4	Kevin Harvick	Stewart-Haas Racing	Ford	59	1
11	15	7	Corey LaJoie	Spire Motorsports	Chevrolet	59	0
12	12	42	Ty Dillon	Petty GMS Motorsports	Chevrolet	59	0
13	19	44	Greg Biffle (i)	NY Racing Team	Chevrolet	59	0
14	1	48	Alex Bowman	Hendrick Motorsports	Chevrolet	59	0
15	4	11	Denny Hamlin	Joe Gibbs Racing	Toyota	59	0
16	17	51	Cody Ware	Rick Ware Racing	Ford	59	0
17	20	15	David Ragan	Rick Ware Racing	Ford	58	0
18	10	3	Austin Dillon	Richard Childress Racing	Chevrolet	58	0
19	2	10	Aric Almirola	Stewart-Haas Racing	Ford	58	0
20	21	66	Timmy Hill (i)	MBM Motorsports	Ford	56	0
21	18	27	Jacques Villeneuve	Team Hezeberg Powered by Reaume Brothers Racing	Ford	34	0
Official race results

== Media ==
=== Television ===
FS1
Booth announcers	Pit reporters
Lap-by-lap: Mike Joy; Color-commentator: Clint Bowyer; Color-commentator: Larry McReynolds	Jamie Little; Regan Smith

=== Radio ===
MRN Radio
Booth announcers	Turn announcers	Pit reporters
Lead announcer: Alex Hayden; Announcer: Jeff Striegle; Announcer: Rusty Wallace	Turns 1 & 2: Dave Moody; Backstretch: Mike Bagley; Turns 3 & 4: Kyle Rickey	Steve Post; Kim Coon
