= Austin Hill =

American racing driver (born 1994)

- Hill at Las Vegas Motor Speedway in 2026
- Born: Austin Edward Hill; April 21, 1994 (age 32); Winston, Georgia, U.S.
- Height: 6 ft 2 in (1.88 m)
- Weight: 240 lb (110 kg)
- Awards: 2023 NASCAR Xfinity Series Regular Season Champion; 2020 NASCAR Gander RV & Outdoors Truck Series Regular Season Champion; 2022 NASCAR Xfinity Series Rookie of the Year

NASCAR Cup Series career
- 41 races run over 5 years
- Car no., team: No. 33 (Richard Childress Racing)
- 2026 position: 44th
- Best finish: 44th (2026)
- First race: 2022 FireKeepers Casino 400 (Michigan)
- Last race: 2026 Season Finale 400 (Homestead)
Wins	Top tens	Poles
0	1	0

NASCAR O'Reilly Auto Parts Series career
- 179 races run over 8 years
- 2026 position: 10th
- Best finish: 4th (2024)
- First race: 2019 Indiana 250 (Indianapolis)
- Last race: 2026 O'Reilly Auto Parts 300 (Homestead)
- First win: 2022 Beef. It's What's for Dinner. 300 (Daytona)
- Last win: 2026 United Rentals Driven to Serve 250 (San Diego)
Wins	Top tens	Poles
16	102	7

NASCAR FedEx Freight Truck Series career
- 122 races run over 10 years
- 2023 position: 110th
- Best finish: 5th (2019)
- First race: 2014 Kroger 200 (Martinsville)
- Last race: 2023 CRC Brakleen 150 (Pocono)
- First win: 2019 NextEra Energy 250 (Daytona)
- Last win: 2021 United Rentals 176 at The Glen (Watkins Glen)
Wins	Top tens	Poles
8	54	3

ARCA Menards Series career
- 5 races run over 3 years
- Best finish: 45th (2021)
- First race: 2015 Lucas Oil 200 (Daytona)
- Last race: 2021 Clean Harbors 100 at The Glen (Watkins Glen)
Wins	Top tens	Poles
0	3	0

ARCA Menards Series East career
- 39 races run over 6 years
- Best finish: 3rd (2015)
- First race: 2012 JEGS 150 (Columbus)
- Last race: 2018 Great Outdoors RV Superstore 100 (Watkins Glen)
- First win: 2013 Drive Sober 150 (Dover)
- Last win: 2015 UNOH 100 (Richmond)
Wins	Top tens	Poles
5	24	1

ARCA Menards Series West career
- 1 race run over 1 year
- Best finish: 71st (2014)
- First race: 2014 Casino Arizona 100 (Phoenix)
Wins	Top tens	Poles
0	0	0
- Statistics up to date as of November 8, 2026.

Austin Edward Hill (born April 21, 1994) is an American professional stock car racing driver. He competes full-time in the NASCAR Cup Series, driving the No. 33 Chevrolet Camaro ZL1. He has previously competed in the NASCAR O'Reilly Auto Parts Series, where he hold the record for the most wins in drafting tracks.

Hill has previously owned NASCAR Craftsman Truck Series and ARCA Menards Series team Austin Hill Racing from 2013 to 2017.

== Racing career ==
Starting racing when he was six, Hill climbed the ladder racing various disciplines such as Legend cars and Bandolero racing.

=== K&N Pro Series East ===
After driving sporadically in 2012, Hill captured a win in 2013 despite only running five races that season. His first full season in the series (2014) started slow but ended well, winning the final two races to finish fifth in the points. Hill continued his career in the K&N Pro Series East with a strong 2015 season. Driving for a family-owned team, he captured a pole, two wins, and failed to finish only once in a season that left him third in points. After switching his focus to the Camping World Truck Series in 2016, he only ran one race in the series, finishing ninth.

=== ARCA Menards Series ===
Hill debuted in the ARCA Menards Series at the 2015 season opener, avoiding wrecks to finish just outside the top ten at Daytona International Speedway.

Hill returned to the ARCA Menards Series in 2021. During his Truck Series off weekend, he drove in the race at Mid-Ohio Sports Car Course in preparation for the Truck Series road course races later in the season. He drove for his Truck Series team, Hattori Racing Enterprises, in their No. 1 car.

=== Craftsman Truck Series ===
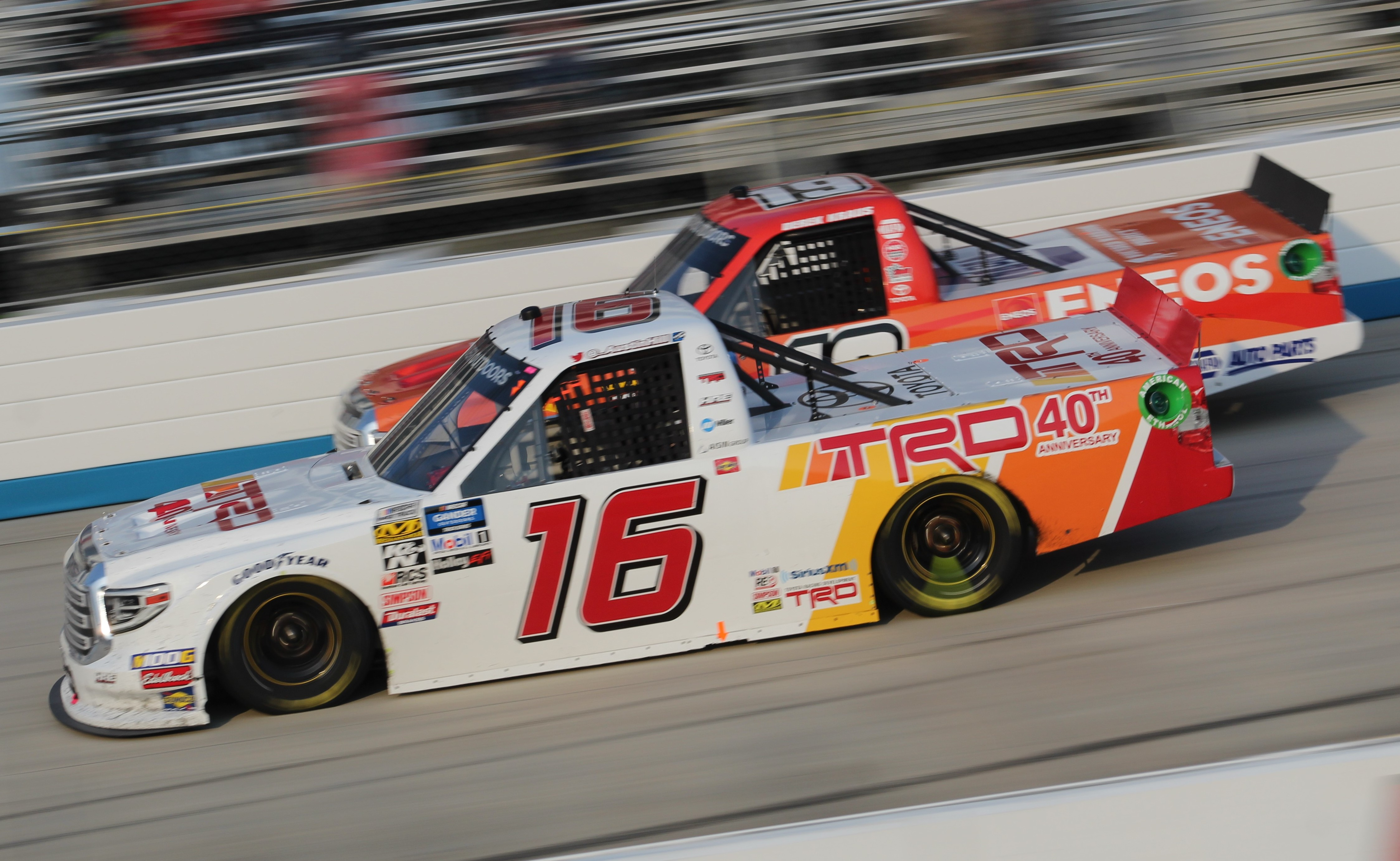
Hill racing Derek Kraus in the 2019 JEGS 200

Hill debuted in 2014 with RBR Enterprises, with finishes of 26th at Martinsville Speedway and twentieth at Homestead-Miami Speedway during that season. Hill landed a part-time ride with Empire Racing in the 2014 season, crashing at Daytona International Speedway and recording a best finish of sixteenth (at Dover International Speedway) in three other starts that year.

For the start of 2016, Hill announced that he would again run the Daytona race with Empire, and then switched to his family-owned Austin Hill Racing for a part-time schedule. He failed to qualify for Daytona and four other races early in the season and had a best finish of fifteenth through the twelfth race of the year. Picking up his schedule after that and running some races in an entry bought out from Young's Motorsports, Hill started to experience more consistent success, leading up to his first top-ten, a tenth place at Martinsville Speedway. Hill formally became a part of the Young's team in 2018, running a full season for the team and grabbing a top-five finish at Texas Motor Speedway. Hill later said that when he joined the team, he figured it would be a long-term arrangement, not just a year.

On January 8, 2019, it was announced that Hill joined Hattori Racing Enterprises' No. 16 Toyota Tundra full-time for the upcoming season. The arrangement was made after crew chief Scott Zipadelli reached out to Hill after previous driver Brett Moffitt departed the team. Hill scored his record first win at the season-opening Daytona race. At Pocono in July, Hill set a new track record for the Truck Series on his way to the pole. He won the regular-season finale race at Michigan for his second career win, and won again at the playoff race at Las Vegas, advancing his team to the Round of 6. Hill failed to advance to the Championship 4, but won the finale at Homestead, finishing fifth in final points.

On November 5, 2019, HRE announced that Hill would remain in the No. 16 for the 2020 Truck Series season. He qualified for the playoffs and advanced to the Round of 8 with a win at Las Vegas. An Ilmor engine failure at Martinsville ended the team's playoffs in the second round.

On October 30, 2020, Hill was confirmed for a third full season with HRE.

On February 11, 2022, it was announced that Hill would drive the No. 7 truck for Spire Motorsports at Daytona.

=== O'Reilly Auto Parts Series ===
On June 16, 2019, it was announced that Hill would make his NASCAR Xfinity Series debut at the Circle K Firecracker 250 at Daytona for Hattori Racing Enterprises, driving the No. 61 Toyota Supra. However, he missed the race after his car suffered drive line issues that prevented him from setting a qualifying time. Later debuting at Indianapolis Motor Speedway, Hill used the high groove to his advantage on his way to scoring a ninth-place finish in his series debut.

Hill and HRE continued their part-time Xfinity schedule in 2020, starting with the season opener at Daytona. On October 30, Hill was confirmed for a 2021 part-time return to the No. 61 machine.

==== 2022-2026: Full-time with Richard Childress Racing ====
On October 29, 2021, Hill was announced as a full-time driver for Richard Childress Racing. He scored his first career win at Daytona after passing A. J. Allmendinger on the final lap of the race. The end of the race was marred by a vicious last lap wreck that sent Myatt Snider into the backstretch catchfence. Hill led the most laps and scored his second career Xfinity win at his home track of Atlanta in July. Hill was eliminated from the Xfinity Playoffs following the Round of 8 after finishing ninth at Martinsville as a result of a collision with Snider. Following the race, Hill punched Snider in the face on pit road. At the end of the season, he finished sixth in the points standings and won the 2022 NASCAR Xfinity Series Rookie of the Year honors.

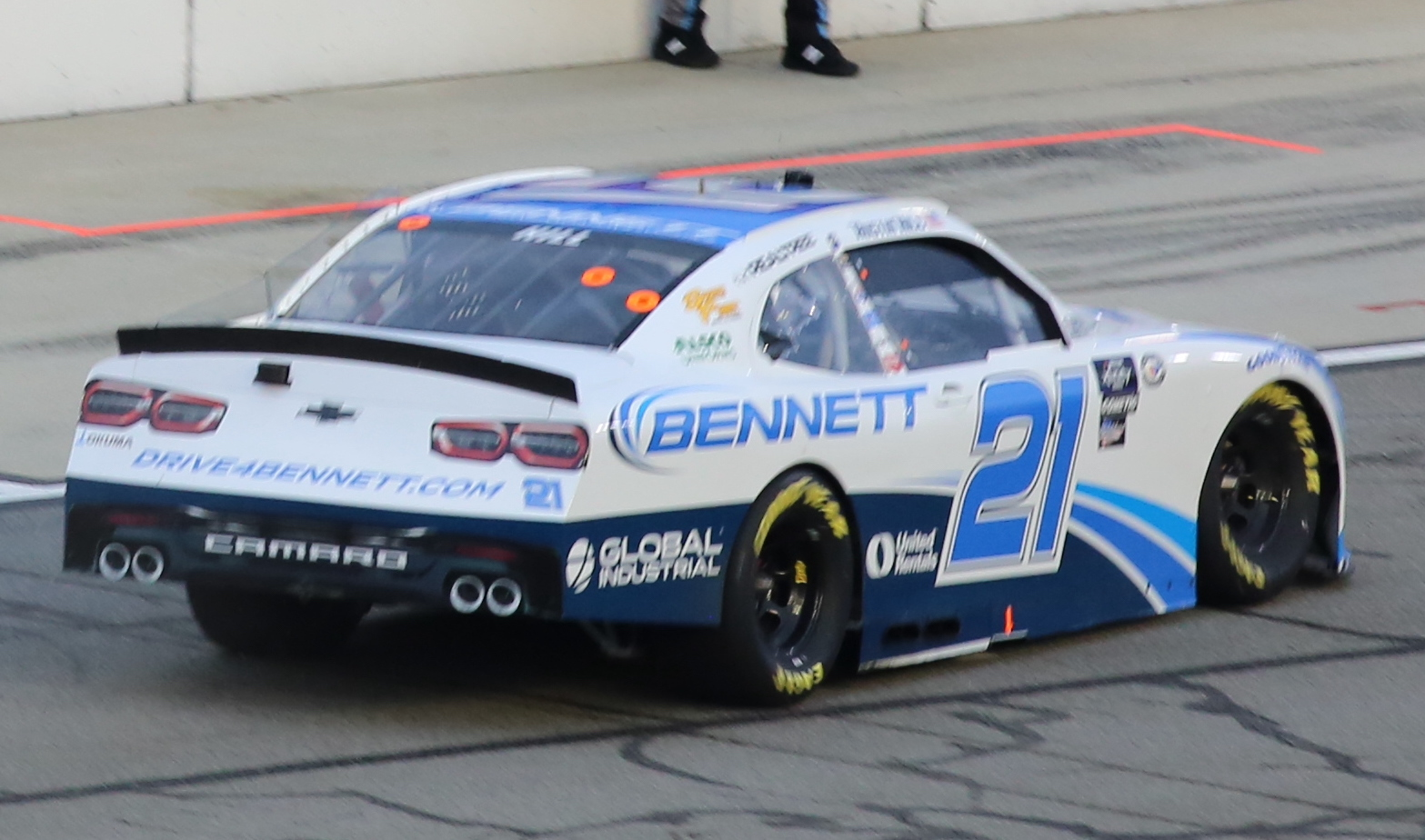
Hill at Auto Club Speedway in 2023

Hill began the 2023 season by winning his second straight season opener at Daytona. He also scored wins at Las Vegas, Atlanta, and Pocono.

In 2024, Hill made history by winning his third straight season opener at Daytona. In the next round at Atlanta, his team used fuel strategy to help him take his second win in a row. At Charlotte, Hill and Cole Custer were trading paint on the frontstretch for fifth place when contact blew a right front tire on Hill's car. He crashed in turn 1 and collected Custer. Hill, showing his displeasure with how he was raced, locked bumpers with Custer's car and left-reared Custer's damaged car on the backstretch, which sent him into the inside wall. As a result, Hill was fined US$25,000 and docked 25 points. Later in the year, Hill won his third race of the season at Atlanta. During the playoffs, he won at Homestead to make the Championship 4.

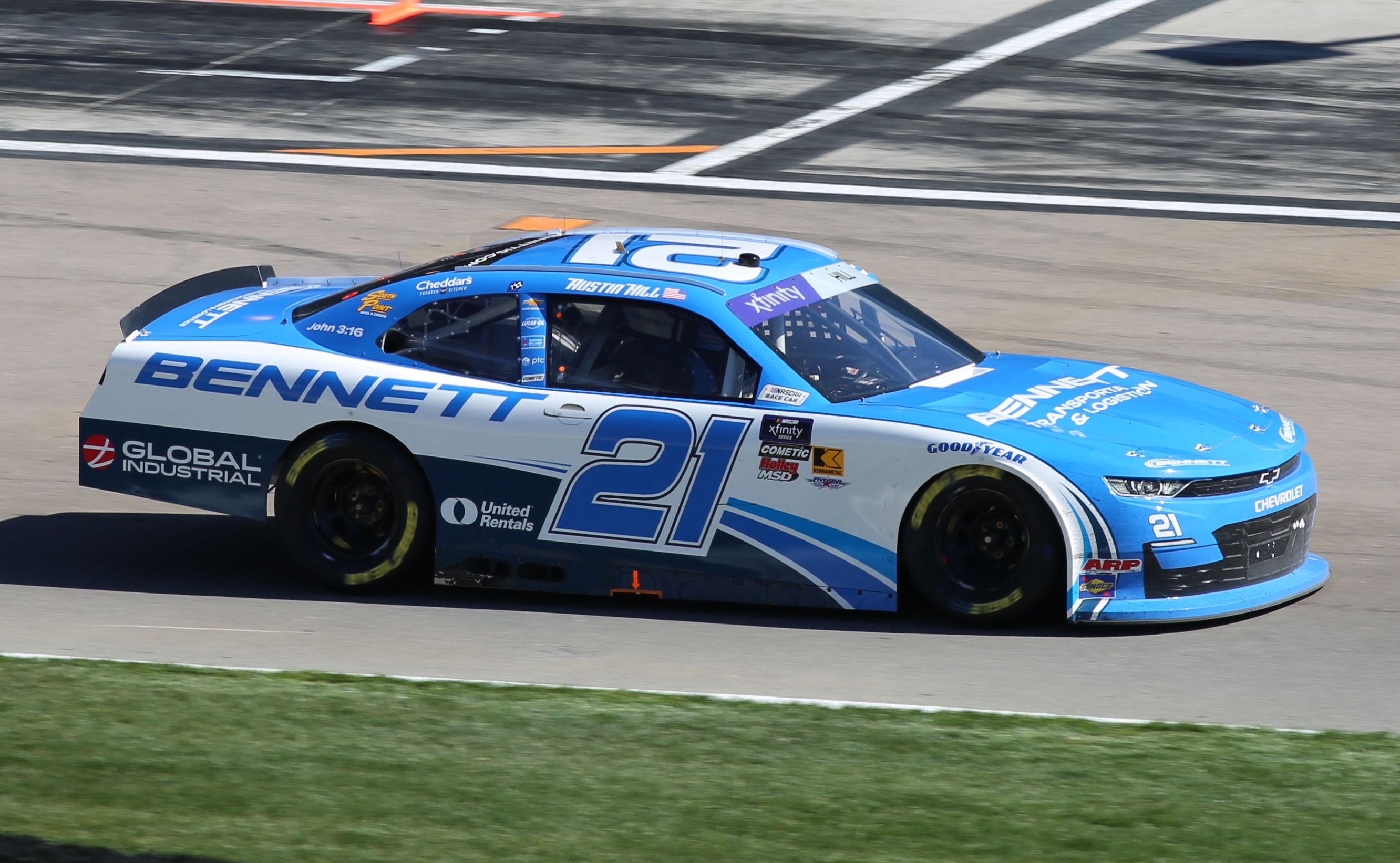
Hill's No. 21 car at Las Vegas Motor Speedway in 2025

Hill started the 2025 season with a 33rd-place DNF at Daytona. A week later, he rebounded with a win at Atlanta. Hill also scored wins at Martinsville and Talladega. At Indianapolis, Hill was penalized five laps for intentionally right-rear hooking Aric Almirola to the outside wall. Hill was then issued a one race suspension by NASCAR for the incident, and lost all 21 playoff points previously accumulated. After getting eliminated during the first round of the playoffs, he won at Talladega, sweeping Talladega for the season.

Hill started the 2026 season with another win at Daytona after dominating the night. He would also go on to win at Naval Base Coronado.

=== Cup Series ===
==== 2022–2025: Part time ====
On August 2, 2022, RCR announced that Hill would make his Cup Series debut in the No. 33 at Michigan.

Hill attempted to make the 2023 Daytona 500 with the Beard Motorsports No. 62, but he failed to make the field after a late crash resulted in an eighteenth-place finish in Duel 2 of the 2023 Bluegreen Vacations Duels.

On April 5, 2024, RCR announced that Hill would race in the No. 33 for multiple races starting at Texas.

On March 24, 2025, RCR announced that Hill would run in the No. 33 for multiple races starting at Darlington. He scored his first career Cup top-ten with a ninth-place finish at the Chicago street race.

==== 2026: Unforeseen interim ====
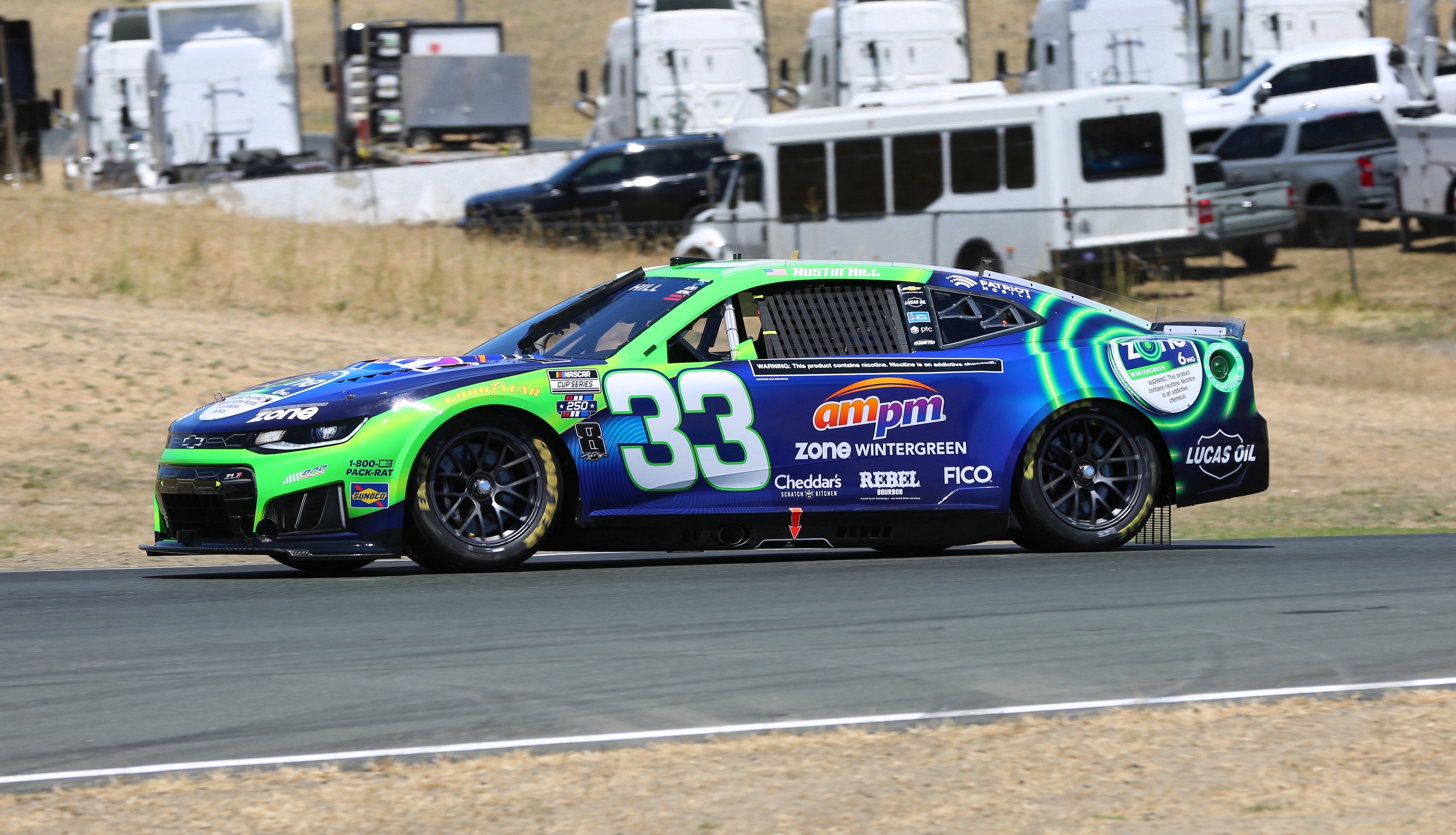
Hill in the No. 33 at Sonoma Raceway in 2026

Hill returned to the No. 33 in 2026 with the intention of running a limited schedule of five races. He finished 21st at Phoenix and 33rd at Martinsville.

On May 21, 2026, Hill was scheduled to drive the No. 8 in place of regular driver Kyle Busch at Charlotte, due to Busch being hospitalized with a severe illness. Busch passed away later that day. Later that evening of the announcement, the car was renumbered to No. 33. During an RCR press conference held at Michigan International Speedway on June 6, 2026, Richard Childress announced Hill would continue to substitute in the renumbered 33 car for the remainder of the 2026 Cup Series season.

==== 2027: Full-time with RCR ====
On August 24, 2026, RCR announced that Hill will compete full-time in 2027, marking Hill's first season as an eligible driver for the Cup Series championship.

== Personal life ==
Hill and his wife have three children: two daughters and a son.

Despite sharing a name, Hill isn't related to the Ohio-born driver, Austin J. Hill.

== Motorsports career results ==
=== Career summary ===
Season	Series	Team	Races	Wins	Top 5	Top 10	Points	Position
2012	NASCAR K&N Pro Series East	MacDonald Motorsports	2	0	0	0	55	44th
2013	NASCAR K&N Pro Series East	Austin Hill Racing	5	1	1	2	160	22nd
2014	NASCAR K&N Pro Series East	Austin Hill Racing	16	2	7	10	546	5th
2014	NASCAR K&N Pro Series West	Austin Hill Racing	1	0	0	0	29	71st
2014	NASCAR Camping World Truck Series	RBR Enterprises	2	0	0	0	43	55th
2015	NASCAR K&N Pro Series East	Austin Hill Racing	14	2	5	11	513	**3rd**
2015	ARCA Racing Series	Empire Racing	1	0	0	0	165	104th
2015	NASCAR Camping World Truck Series	Empire Racing	4	0	0	0	75	44th
2016	NASCAR K&N Pro Series East	Martin-McClure Racing	1	0	0	1	35	47th
2016	NASCAR Camping World Truck Series	Empire Racing	0	0	0	0	142	26th
2016	NASCAR Camping World Truck Series	Austin Hill Racing	10	0	0	1	142	26th
2017	NASCAR Camping World Truck Series	Austin Hill Racing	12	0	0	1	226	23rd
2018	NASCAR K&N Pro Series East	Visconti Motorsports	1	0	0	0	32	49th
2018	ARCA Racing Series	Chad Finley Racing	1	0	0	0	345	63rd
2018	ARCA Racing Series	MDM Motorsports	1	0	0	1	345	63rd
2018	NASCAR Camping World Truck Series	Young's Motorsports	23	0	1	6	520	11th
2019	NASCAR Gander Outdoors Truck Series	Hattori Racing Enterprises	23	4	7	13	2298	5th
2019	NASCAR Xfinity Series	Hattori Racing Enterprises	1	0	0	1	0	NC†
2020	NASCAR Gander Outdoors Truck Series	Hattori Racing Enterprises	23	2	11	17	2242	6th
2020	NASCAR Xfinity Series	Hattori Racing Enterprises	9	0	1	2	0	NC†
2021	ARCA Menards Series	Hattori Racing Enterprises	2	0	2	2	84	45th
2021	NASCAR Camping World Truck Series	Hattori Racing Enterprises	22	2	8	15	2210	9th
2021	NASCAR Xfinity Series	Hattori Racing Enterprises	5	0	0	1	0	NC†
2022	NASCAR Camping World Truck Series	Spire Motorsports	2	0	0	1	0	NC†
2022	NASCAR Xfinity Series	Richard Childress Racing	33	2	11	21	2273	6th
2022	NASCAR Cup Series	Richard Childress Racing	1	0	0	0	0	NC†
2023	NASCAR Craftsman Truck Series	Spire Motorsports	1	0	0	0	0	NC†
2023	NASCAR Xfinity Series	Richard Childress Racing	33	4	16	24	2273	5th
2023	NASCAR Cup Series	Beard Motorsports	5	0	0	0	0	NC†
2024	NASCAR Xfinity Series	Richard Childress Racing	33	4	11	20	4027	4th
2024	NASCAR Cup Series	Richard Childress Racing	4	0	0	0	0	NC†
2025	NASCAR Xfinity Series	Richard Childress Racing	32	4	13	18	2230	6th
2025	NASCAR Cup Series	Richard Childress Racing	5	0	0	1	0	NC†
2026	NASCAR O'Reilly Auto Parts Series	Richard Childress Racing	23	2	6	10	716*	7th*
2026	NASCAR Cup Series	Richard Childress Racing	14	0	0	0	0*	NC†*

^{†} As Hill was a guest driver, he was ineligible for championship points.

=== NASCAR ===
(key) (Bold – Pole position awarded by qualifying time. Italics – Pole position earned by points standings or practice time. * – Most laps led.)

==== Cup Series ====
NASCAR Cup Series results
Year	Team	No.	Make	1	2	3	4	5	6	7	8	9	10	11	12	13	14	15	16	17	18	19	20	21	22	23	24	25	26	27	28	29	30	31	32	33	34	35	36	NCSC	Pts	Ref
2022	Richard Childress Racing	33	Chevy	DAY	CAL	LVS	PHO	ATL	COA	RCH	MAR	BRD	TAL	DOV	DAR	KAN	CLT	GTW	SON	NSH	ROA	ATL	NHA	POC	IRC	MCH; 18	RCH	GLN	DAY	DAR	KAN	BRI	TEX	TAL	ROV	LVS	HOM	MAR	PHO	50th	0^{1}	
2023	Beard Motorsports	62	Chevy	DAY; DNQ	CAL	LVS	PHO	ATL	COA	RCH	BRD	MAR	TAL; 24	DOV	KAN	DAR	CLT	GTW	SON	NSH	CSC	ATL; 37	NHA	POC	RCH	MCH; 28	IRC	GLN	DAY; 14	DAR	KAN	BRI	TEX	TAL	ROV; 27	LVS	HOM	MAR	PHO	49th	0^{1}	
2024	Richard Childress Racing	33	Chevy	DAY	ATL	LVS	PHO	BRI	COA	RCH	MAR	TEX; 38	TAL	DOV	KAN; 33	DAR	CLT	GTW	SON	IOW	NHA	NSH	CSC; 31	POC	IND	RCH	MCH	DAY; 25	DAR	ATL	GLN	BRI	KAN	TAL	ROV	LVS	HOM	MAR	PHO	56th	0^{1}	
2025	Richard Childress Racing	33	Chevy	DAY	ATL	COA	PHO	LVS	HOM	MAR	DAR; 31	BRI	TAL	TEX	KAN	CLT	NSH	MCH	MXC	POC	ATL	CSC; 9	SON	DOV	IND	IOW	GLN	RCH	DAY; 30	DAR	GTW	BRI; 25	NHA	KAN	ROV	LVS	TAL; 22	MAR	PHO	46th	0^{1}	
2026	Richard Childress Racing	33	Chevy	DAY	ATL	COA	PHO; 21	LVS	DAR	MAR; 33	BRI	KAN	TAL	TEX	GLN	CLT; 27	NSH; 27	MCH; 20	POC; 18	COR; 36	SON; 34	CHI; 37	ATL; 31	NWS; 33	IND; 33	IOW; 26	RCH; 23	NHA; 24	DAY; 27*	DAR; 28	GTW; 21	BRI; 29	KAN; 26	LVS; 22	CLT; 32	PHO; 24	TAL; 14	MAR; 20	HOM; 15	44th	0^{1}	

===== Daytona 500 =====
Year	Team	Manufacturer	Start	Finish
2023	Beard Motorsports	Chevrolet	DNQ	

==== O'Reilly Auto Parts Series ====
NASCAR O'Reilly Auto Parts Series results
Year	Team	No.	Make	1	2	3	4	5	6	7	8	9	10	11	12	13	14	15	16	17	18	19	20	21	22	23	24	25	26	27	28	29	30	31	32	33	NOAPSC	Pts	Ref
2019	Hattori Racing Enterprises	61	Toyota	DAY	ATL	LVS	PHO	CAL	TEX	BRI	RCH	TAL	DOV	CLT	POC	MCH	IOW	CHI	DAY; DNQ	KEN	NHA	IOW	GLN	MOH	BRI	ROA	DAR	IND; 9	LVS	RCH	ROV	DOV	KAN	TEX	PHO	HOM	89th	0^{1}	
2020	Hattori Racing Enterprises	61	Toyota	DAY; 35	LVS	CAL; 16	PHO	DAR	CLT; 33	BRI	ATL	HOM	HOM	TAL	POC	IRC	KEN	KEN	TEX	KAN	ROA	DRC	DOV	DOV	DAY	DAR; 9	RCH	RCH	BRI	LVS; 17	TAL; 33	ROV; 36	KAN; 5	TEX; 33	MAR	PHO	78th	0^{1}	
2021	Hattori Racing Enterprises	61	Toyota	DAY	DRC	HOM	LVS	PHO	ATL	MAR	TAL	DAR	DOV	COA	CLT	MOH	TEX	NSH; 9	POC; 25	ROA	ATL	NHA	GLN	IRC; 29	MCH	DAY	DAR	RCH	BRI	LVS	TAL	ROV; 18	TEX; 20	KAN	MAR	PHO	86th	0^{1}	
2022	Richard Childress Racing	21	Chevy	DAY; 1	CAL; 27	LVS; 31	PHO; 17	ATL; 2	COA; 2	RCH; 18	MAR; 4	TAL; 27*	DOV; 14	DAR; 9	TEX; 5	CLT; 14	PIR; 3	NSH; 8	ROA; 4	ATL; 1*	NHA; 7	POC; 8	IRC; 9	MCH; 5	GLN; 30	DAY; 14	DAR; 10	KAN; 12	BRI; 3	TEX; 2	**TAL**; 14*	ROV; 29	LVS; 6	HOM; 9	MAR; 9	PHO; 9	6th	2273	
2023	Richard Childress Racing	21	Chevy	**DAY**; 1*	CAL; 6	LVS; 1	PHO; 7	ATL; 1*	COA; 37	RCH; 9	MAR; 17	**TAL**; 18	DOV; 4	DAR; 4	CLT; 4	PIR; 5	SON; 8	NSH; 4	CSC; 5	ATL; 12	NHA; 3	POC; 1	ROA; 3	MCH; 11	IRC; 4	GLN; 14	**DAY**; 23*	DAR; 2	KAN; 5	BRI; 33	TEX; 7	ROV; 9	LVS; 7	HOM; 4	MAR; 21	PHO; 7	5th	2273	
2024	Richard Childress Racing	21	Chevy	DAY; 1	ATL; 1	LVS; 4	PHO; 4	COA; 2	RCH; 8	MAR; 34	TEX; 6	**TAL**; 14*	DOV; 15	DAR; 2	CLT; 25	PIR; 11	SON; 5	IOW; 29	NHA; 24	NSH; 4	CSC; 7	POC; 7	IND; 6	MCH; 18	DAY; 31	DAR; 9	ATL; 1	GLN; 33	BRI; 14	KAN; 7	TAL; 23	ROV; 4	LVS; 10	HOM; 1*	MAR; 14	PHO; 10	4th	4027	
2025	Richard Childress Racing	21	Chevy	DAY; 33*	ATL; 1*	COA; 4	PHO; 37	LVS; 4	HOM; 3	MAR; 1	DAR; 16	BRI; 24	CAR; 6	TAL; 1	TEX; 4	CLT; 7	NSH; 7	MXC; 3	POC; 35	ATL; 26	CSC; 4	SON; 12	DOV; 13	IND; 34	IOW	GLN; 4	DAY; 25	PIR; 5	GTW; 12	BRI; 19	KAN; 3	ROV; 28	LVS; 10	TAL; 1*	MAR; 12	PHO; 9	6th	2230	
2026	Richard Childress Racing	21	Chevy	**DAY**; 1*	ATL; 12*	COA; 2	PHO; 12	LVS; 10	DAR; 35	MAR; 6	CAR; 11	BRI; 21	KAN; 34	TAL; 13	TEX; 7	GLN; 11	DOV; 5	CLT; 3	NSH; 11	POC; 14	COR; 1	SON; 22	CHI; 5	ATL; 22	IND; 10	IOW; 11	DAY; 2	DAR; 5	GTW; 29	BRI; 22	LVS; 9	CLT; 7	PHO; 15	TAL; 35	MAR; 31	HOM; 8	10th	2281	

==== Craftsman Truck Series ====
NASCAR Craftsman Truck Series results
Year	Team	No.	Make	1	2	3	4	5	6	7	8	9	10	11	12	13	14	15	16	17	18	19	20	21	22	23	NCTC	Pts	Ref
2014	RBR Enterprises	92	Ford	DAY	MAR	KAN	CLT	DOV	TEX	GTW	KEN	IOW	ELD	POC	MCH	BRI	MSP	CHI	NHA	LVS	TAL	MAR; 26	TEX	PHO	HOM; 20		55th	43	
2015	Empire Racing	82	Ford	DAY; 30	ATL	MAR	KAN	CLT	DOV; 16	TEX	GTW	IOW	KEN	ELD	POC	MCH	BRI	MSP	CHI	NHA	LVS	TAL; 22	MAR; 19	TEX	PHO	HOM	44th	75	
2016	Empire Racing	43	Ford	DAY; DNQ																							26th	142	
2016	Austin Hill Racing	20	Ford		ATL; 12	MAR	KAN		CLT; DNQ	TEX; 15	IOW	GTW											MAR; 10	TEX; 19	PHO	HOM; 17	26th	142	
2016	Austin Hill Racing	1	Ford					DOV; 17																			26th	142	
2016	Austin Hill Racing	02	Ford										KEN; 18	ELD	POC; 31	BRI; 19	MCH	MSP	CHI	NHA; 30	LVS	TAL					26th	142	
2017	Austin Hill Racing	02	Ford	DAY	ATL; 18	MAR; 14	KAN	CLT; 25	DOV; 27	TEX	GTW; 14	IOW	KEN; 10	ELD	POC; 11	MCH	BRI; 22	MSP	CHI	NHA; 22	LVS	TAL	MAR; 16	TEX; 11	PHO; 23	HOM	23rd	226	
2018	Young's Motorsports	02	Chevy	DAY; 11	ATL; 18	LVS; 10	MAR; 9	DOV; 31	KAN; 12	CLT; 18	TEX; 13	IOW; 14	GTW; 11	CHI; 9	KEN; 16	ELD; 21	POC; 13	MCH; 19	BRI; 21	MSP; 8	LVS; 23	TAL; 10	MAR; 20	TEX; 5	PHO; 30	HOM; 21	11th	520	
2019	Hattori Racing Enterprises	16	Toyota	DAY; 1*	ATL; 7	LVS; 30	MAR; 16	TEX; 27	DOV; 7	KAN; 4	CLT; 6	TEX; 8	IOW; 12	GTW; 11	**CHI**; 5	KEN; 31	**POC**; 30	ELD; 32	MCH; 1*	BRI; 10	MSP; 5	LVS; 1	TAL; 6	MAR; 26	**PHO**; 13	HOM; 1*	5th	2298	
2020	Hattori Racing Enterprises	16	Toyota	DAY; 6	LVS; 3	CLT; 9	ATL; 2	HOM; 7	POC; 2	KEN; 5	TEX; 30	KAN; 1*	KAN; 6	MCH; 12	DRC; 5	DOV; 8	GTW; 3	DAR; 3	RCH; 8	BRI; 25	LVS; 1	TAL; 19	KAN; 3	TEX; 2	MAR; 35	PHO; 12	6th	2242	
2021	Hattori Racing Enterprises	16	Toyota	DAY; 22	DRC; 33	LVS; 3	ATL; 2	BRD; 9	RCH; 10	KAN; 3	DAR; 13	COA; 9	CLT; 9	TEX; 4	NSH; 9	POC; 5	KNX; 1	GLN; 1*	GTW; 23	DAR; 12	BRI; 24	LVS; 10	TAL; 32	MAR; 2	PHO; 10		9th	2210	
2022	Spire Motorsports	7	Chevy	DAY; 15	LVS	ATL	COA	MAR	BRD	DAR	KAN	TEX	CLT	GTW	SON	KNX	NSH	MOH	POC; 6	IRP	RCH	KAN	BRI	TAL	HOM	PHO	90th	0^{1}	
2023	Spire Motorsports	7	Chevy	DAY	LVS	ATL	COA	TEX	BRD	MAR	KAN	DAR	NWS	CLT	GTW	NSH	MOH	POC; 33	RCH	IRP	MLW	KAN	BRI	TAL	HOM	PHO	110th	0^{1}	

^{*} Season still in progress
^{1} Ineligible for series points

==== K&N Pro Series East ====
NASCAR K&N Pro Series East results
Year	Team	No.	Make	1	2	3	4	5	6	7	8	9	10	11	12	13	14	15	16	NKNPSEC	Pts	Ref
2012	MacDonald Motorsports	49	Toyota	BRI	GRE	RCH	IOW	BGS	JFC	LGY	CNB	COL; 18	IOW	NHA	DOV	GRE; 15	CAR			44th	55	
2013	Austin Hill Racing	13	Toyota	BRI; 16	GRE	FIF	RCH; 7	BGS	IOW; 23	LGY	COL									22nd	160	
2013	Austin Hill Racing	13	Ford									IOW; 17	VIR	GRE	NHA	DOV; 1	RAL			22nd	160	
2014	Austin Hill Racing	22	Ford	NSM; 27	DAY; 2	BRI; 5	GRE; 22	RCH; 4	IOW; 9	BGS; 3	FIF; 10	LGY; 15	NHA; 7	COL; 18	IOW; 25	GLN; 17	VIR; 3	GRE; 1*	DOV; 1*	5th	546	
2015	Austin Hill Racing	22	Ford	**NSM**; 1**	GRE; 4	BRI; 7	IOW; 7	BGS; 14	LGY; 10	COL; 7	NHA; 5	IOW; 17	GLN; 6	MOT; 3	VIR; 6	RCH; 1*	DOV; 27			3rd	513	
2016	Martin–McClure Racing	39	Toyota	NSM	MOB	GRE	BRI	VIR	DOM	STA	COL	NHA	IOW	GLN	GRE	NJM; 9	DOV			47th	35	
2018	Visconti Motorsports	74	Chevy	NSM	BRI	LGY	SBO	SBO	MEM	NJM	THO	NHA	IOW	GLN; 12	GTW	NHA	DOV			49th	32	

==== K&N Pro Series West ====
NASCAR K&N Pro Series West results
Year	Team	No.	Make	1	2	3	4	5	6	7	8	9	10	11	12	13	14	NKNPSWC	Pts	Ref
2014	Austin Hill Racing	22	Ford	PHO	IRW	S99	IOW	KCR	SON	SLS	CNS	IOW	EVG	KCR	MMP	AAS	PHO; 15	71st	29	

=== ARCA Menards Series ===
(key) (Bold – Pole position awarded by qualifying time. Italics – Pole position earned by points standings or practice time. * – Most laps led.)

ARCA Menards Series results
Year	Team	No.	Make	1	2	3	4	5	6	7	8	9	10	11	12	13	14	15	16	17	18	19	20	AMSC	Pts	Ref
2015	Empire Racing	8	Ford	DAY; 13	MOB	NSH	SLM	TAL	TOL	NJM	POC	MCH	CHI	WIN	IOW	IRP	POC	BLN	ISF	DSF	SLM	KEN	KAN	104th	165	
2018	Chad Finley Racing	51	Chevy	DAY	NSH	SLM	TAL	TOL	CLT; 13	POC	MCH	MAD	GTW											63rd	345	
2018	MDM Motorsports	12	Toyota											CHI; 10	IOW	ELK	POC	ISF	BLN	DSF	SLM	IRP	KAN	63rd	345	
2021	Hattori Racing Enterprises	1	Toyota	DAY	PHO	TAL	KAN	TOL	CLT	MOH; 2	POC	ELK	BLN	IOW	WIN	GLN; 2	MCH	ISF	MLW	DSF	BRI	SLM	KAN	45th	84	
