= Team Hezeberg =

American stock car racing team

Team Hezeberg Powered By Reaume Brothers Racing
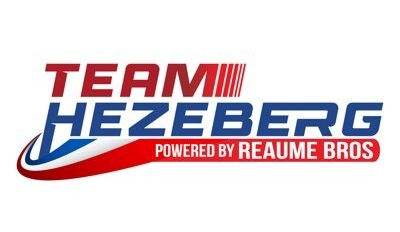
- Owner(s): Toine Hezemans; Ernst Berg; Josh Reaume
- Base: Mooresville, North Carolina
- Series: NASCAR Cup Series
- Race drivers: Cup Series: 26. Daniil Kvyat (part-time); 27. Jacques Villeneuve, Loris Hezemans (part-time)
- Manufacturer: Ford; Toyota
- Opened: 2021

Career
- Debut: Cup Series: 2022 Daytona 500 (Daytona)
- Latest race: Cup Series: 2022 Bank of America Roval 400 (Charlotte)
- Races competed: Total: 6 Cup Series: 6
- Drivers' Championships: Total: 0 Cup Series:
- Race victories: Total: 0 Cup Series:
- Pole positions: Total: 0 Cup Series:

Team Hezeberg Powered By Reaume Brothers Racing is a European-American professional stock car racing team that last competed part-time in the NASCAR Cup Series, fielding the No. 26 Toyota Camry TRD for Daniil Kvyat and the No. 27 Ford Mustang GT for Loris Hezemans and Jacques Villeneuve.

== Cup Series ==
=== Car No. 26 history ===
Daniil Kvyat (2022)

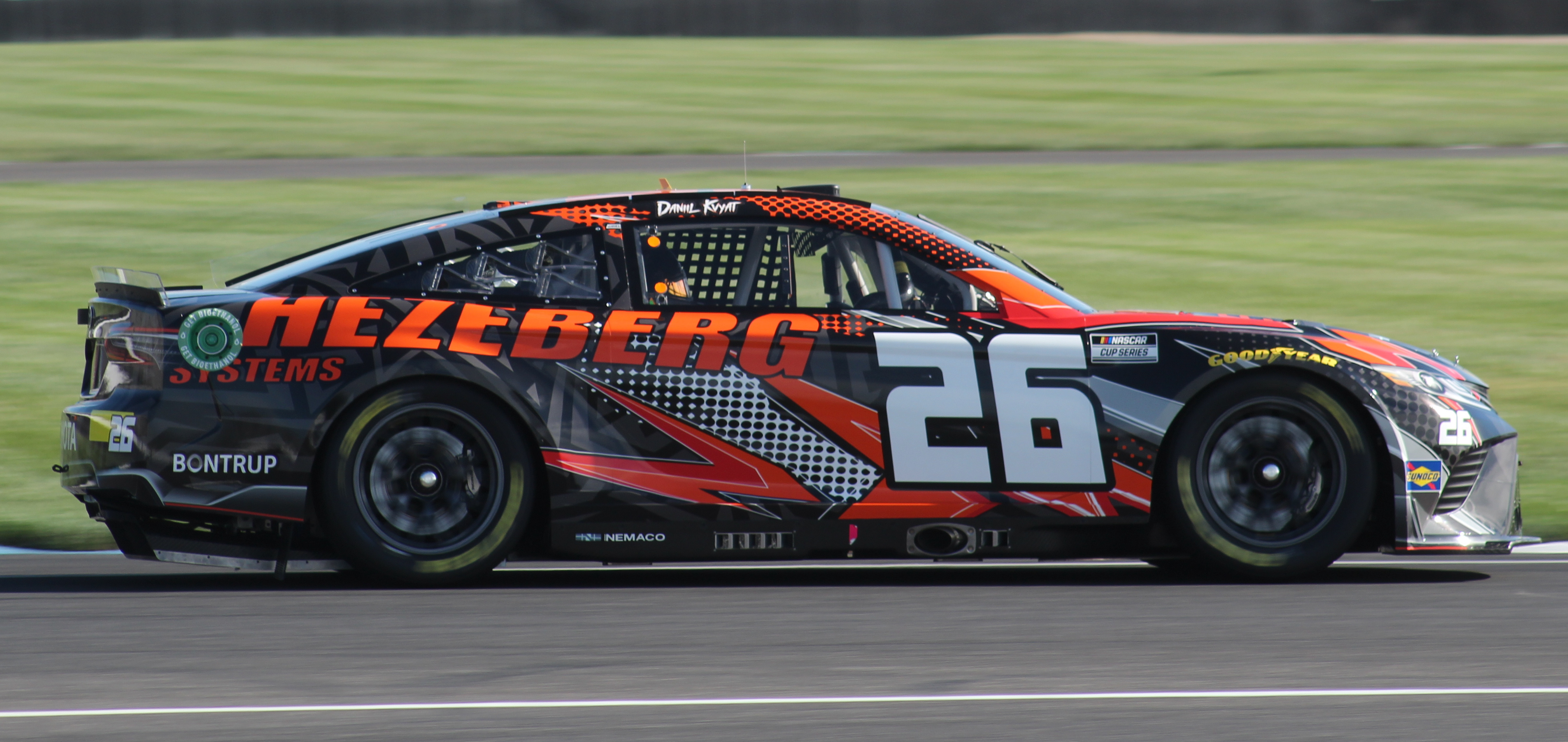
Daniil Kvyat in the No. 26 at Indianapolis Motor Speedway in 2022

On July 2, 2022, it was rumored that former Formula One driver, Daniil Kvyat, would be aiming for a NASCAR road course start. He attended the Cup Series race at Road America as a guest for the team. During an interview with FS1 reporter, Bob Pockrass, Kvyat stated that “This is different but a very fascinating world for me. I always really liked NASCAR and was very curious about it. In fact, I was at Martinsville last year to watch the race, now this year I came to look for opportunities to race here. I think something might come alive very soon, hopefully, and soon you will see me in a NASCAR Cup car.” To prepare, Kvyat tested a late model car for Reaume Brothers Racing at Hickory Motor Speedway.

The team entered Kvyat into the 2022 Verizon 200 at the Brickyard with the No. 26 Toyota Camry. It would be their second entry into the race. Kvyat has driven a No. 26 car before, as he had chosen 26 as his career number in Formula 1.

==== Car No. 26 results ====
Team Hezeberg No. 26
Year	Team	No.	Make	1	2	3	4	5	6	7	8	9	10	11	12	13	14	15	16	17	18	19	20	21	22	23	24	25	26	27	28	29	30	31	32	33	34	35	36	Owners	Pts
2022	Daniil Kvyat	26	Toyota	DAY	CAL	LVS	PHO	ATL	COA	RCH	MAR	BRI	TAL	DOV	DAR	KAN	CLT	GTW	SON	NSH	ROA	ATL	NHA	POC	IND; 36	MCH	RCH	GLN; 36	DAY	DAR	KAN	BRI	TEX	TAL	ROV; 39	LVS	HOM	MAR	PHO	44th	3

=== Car No. 27 history ===
Jacques Villeneuve and Loris Hezemans (2022)

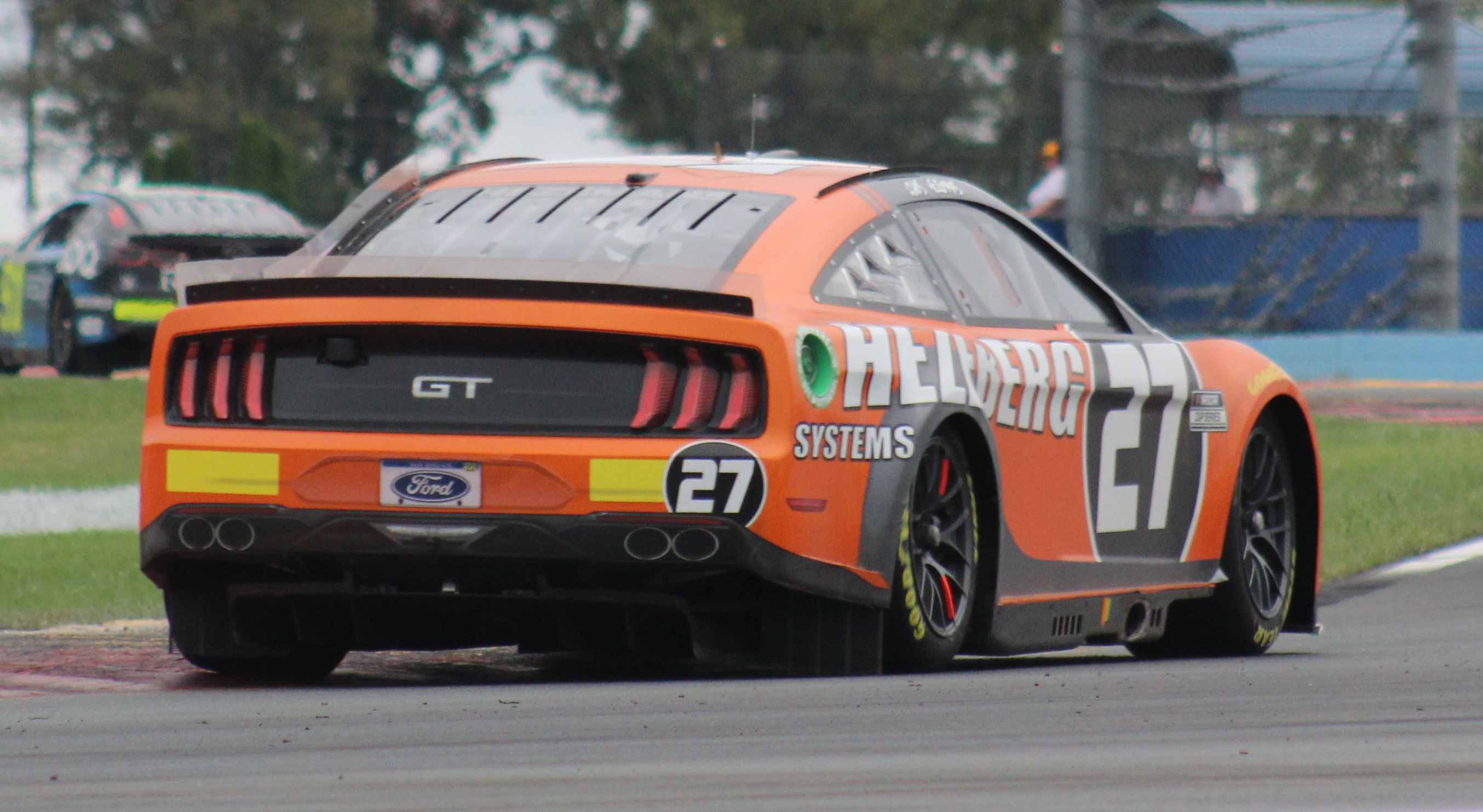
Loris Hezemans in the No. 27 at Watkins Glen International in 2022

On October 9, 2021, NASCAR Whelen Euro Series champion Loris Hezemans and NASCAR Camping World Truck Series Owner-Driver Josh Reaume announced the formation of Team Hezeberg, which would compete on a part-time schedule for the 2022 NASCAR Cup Series with hopes to go full-time in 2023. The team is owned by Loris' father, former racer Toine Hezemans, Dutch entrepreneur Ernst Berg, and NASCAR Craftsman Truck Series Owner-Driver Josh Reaume. Hezeberg Systems, the family company owned by Toine Hezemans, serves as the primary sponsor for the team. Jacques Villeneuve, 1995 IndyCar champion and 1997 Formula 1 World Champion who had made his last NASCAR start in 2013, returned to the NASCAR Cup Series in 2022 in hopes of running select events. The team uses prepared cars from Reaume Brothers Racing, owned by Josh Reaume. Villeneuve took part in the Daytona Next Gen test for Team Hezeberg on the 11th January, 2022. On January 12, 2022, it was announced that Villeneuve would be attempting to make the 2022 Daytona 500 for the team, which would be his first NASCAR start since 2013. Villeneuve would officially make the Daytona 500 after qualifying on speed. On 17th February 2022, Jacques Villeneuve missed the warm up laps of the Bluegreen Vacations Duel Race #2. The cause of the absence was a broken gas cable. The team had sufficient time to fix the problem and Villeneuve rejoined the grid for the start of the race. Unfortunately, Villeneuve was unable to keep pace and abandoned the race with 20 laps remaining. Villeneuve went on to finish 22nd in the Daytona 500 itself, while Hezemans drove the car in the road course races at Circuit of the Americas, Road America, Indianapolis Motor Speedway, Watkins Glen International. and Charlotte Motor Speedway.

==== Car No. 27 results ====
Team Hezeberg No. 27
Year	Driver	No.	Make	1	2	3	4	5	6	7	8	9	10	11	12	13	14	15	16	17	18	19	20	21	22	23	24	25	26	27	28	29	30	31	32	33	34	35	36	Owners	Pts
2022	Jacques Villeneuve	27	Ford	DAY; 22	CAL	LVS	PHO	ATL																																39th	28
2022	Loris Hezemans	27	Ford						COA; 34	RCH	MAR	BRI	TAL	DOV	DAR	KAN	CLT	GTW	SON	NSH	ROA; 37	ATL	NHA	POC	IND; 37	MCH	RCH	GLN; 33	DAY	DAR	KAN	BRI	TEX	TAL	ROV; 33	LVS	HOM	MAR	PHO	39th	28
