= 2022 Go Bowling at The Glen =

NASCAR Cup Series race

Race details
- Race 25 of 36 in the 2022 NASCAR Cup Series
- The layout of Watkins Glen International NASCAR uses.
- Date: August 21, 2022
- Location: Watkins Glen International in Watkins Glen, New York
- Course: Permanent racing facility
- Course length: 2.45 miles (3.94 km)
- Distance: 90 laps, 220.5 mi (354.6 km)
- Weather: 70–71 °F (21–22 °C); Rain/Cloudy; Wind at 7 miles per hour (11 km/h)
- Average speed: 95.962 miles per hour (154.436 km/h)

Pole position
| Driver | Chase Elliott | Hendrick Motorsports |
- Time: 1:10.477

Most laps led
| Driver | Chase Elliott | Hendrick Motorsports |
- Laps: 30

Winner
| No. 5 | Kyle Larson | Hendrick Motorsports |

Television in the United States
- Network: USA
- Announcers: Rick Allen, Steve Letarte (booth), Mike Bagley (Esses), Dale Earnhardt Jr. (Turn 5) and Jeff Burton (Turns 6–7)
- Nielsen ratings: 2,563,000 viewers

Radio in the United States
- Radio: MRN
- Booth announcers: Alex Hayden, Jeff Striegle and Todd Gordon
- Turn announcers: Dave Moody (Esses), Kyle Rickey (Turn 5) and Jason Toy (Turns 6–7)

The 2022 Go Bowling at The Glen was a NASCAR Cup Series race held on August 21, 2022, at Watkins Glen International in Watkins Glen, New York. Contested over 90 laps on the 2.45-mile (3.94 km) road course, it was the 25th race of the 2022 NASCAR Cup Series season.

== Report ==
=== Background ===
The 2022 Go Bowling at The Glen program cover.

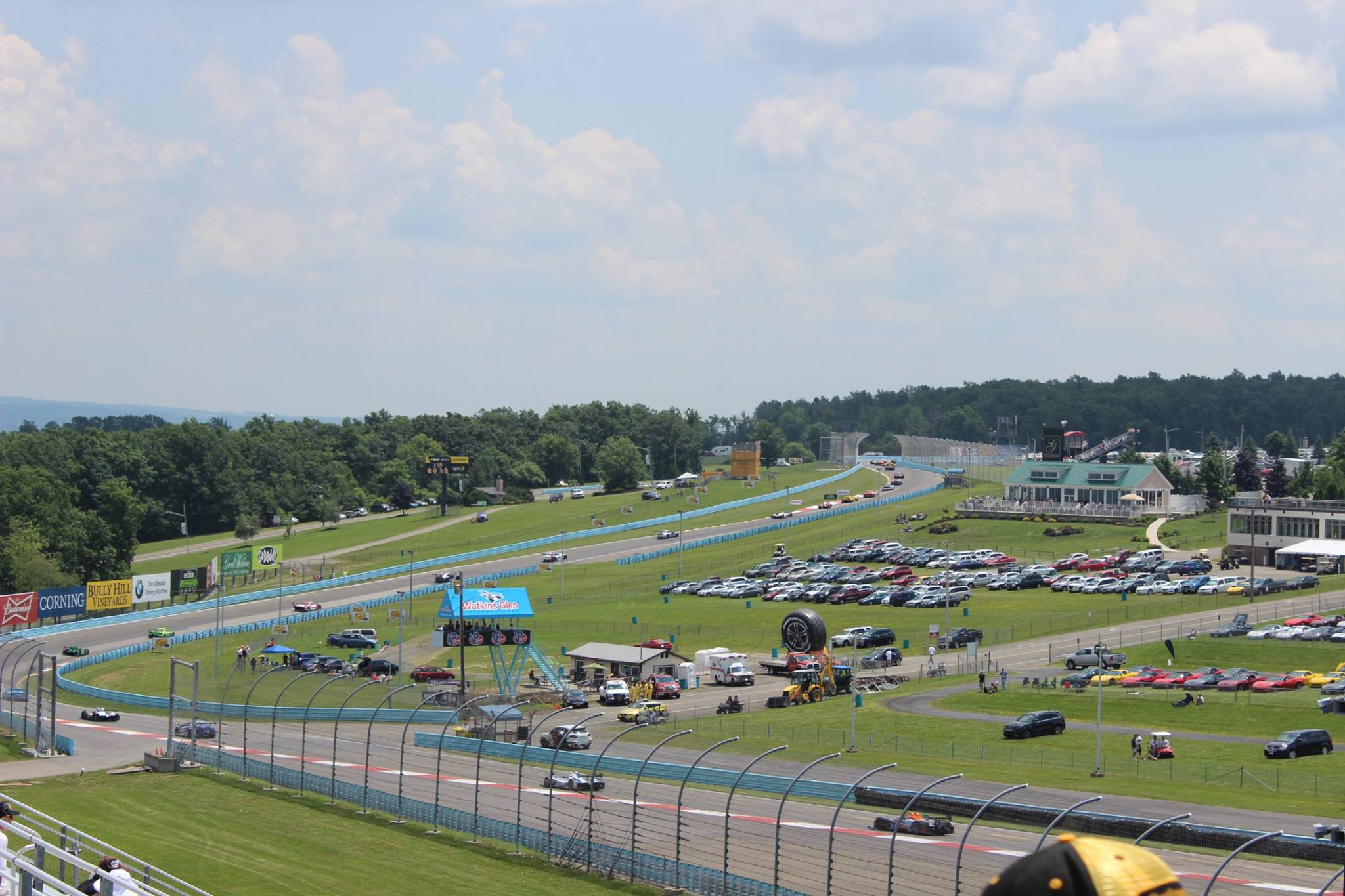
Watkins Glen International

Watkins Glen International (nicknamed "The Glen") is an automobile race track located in Watkins Glen, New York at the southern tip of Seneca Lake. It was long known around the world as the home of the Formula One United States Grand Prix, which it hosted for twenty consecutive years (1961–1980), but the site has been home to road racing of nearly every class, including the World Sportscar Championship, Trans-Am, Can-Am, NASCAR Cup Series, the International Motor Sports Association and the IndyCar Series.

Initially, public roads in the village were used for the race course. In 1956 a permanent circuit for the race was built. In 1968 the race was extended to six hours, becoming the 6 Hours of Watkins Glen. The circuit's current layout has more or less been the same since 1971, although a chicane was installed at the uphill Esses in 1975 to slow cars through these corners, where there was a fatality during practice at the 1973 United States Grand Prix. The chicane was removed in 1985, but another chicane called the "Inner Loop" was installed in 1992 after J.D. McDuffie's fatal accident during the previous year's NASCAR Winston Cup event.

The circuit is known as the Mecca of North American road racing and is a very popular venue among fans and drivers. The facility is currently owned by International Speedway Corporation.

==== Entry list ====
- (R) denotes rookie driver.
- (i) denotes driver who is ineligible for series driver points.

| No. | Driver | Team | Manufacturer |
|---|---|---|---|
| 1 | Ross Chastain | Trackhouse Racing Team | Chevrolet |
| 2 | Austin Cindric (R) | Team Penske | Ford |
| 3 | Austin Dillon | Richard Childress Racing | Chevrolet |
| 4 | Kevin Harvick | Stewart-Haas Racing | Ford |
| 5 | Kyle Larson | Hendrick Motorsports | Chevrolet |
| 6 | Brad Keselowski | RFK Racing | Ford |
| 7 | Corey LaJoie | Spire Motorsports | Chevrolet |
| 8 | Tyler Reddick | Richard Childress Racing | Chevrolet |
| 9 | Chase Elliott | Hendrick Motorsports | Chevrolet |
| 10 | Aric Almirola | Stewart-Haas Racing | Ford |
| 11 | Denny Hamlin | Joe Gibbs Racing | Toyota |
| 12 | Ryan Blaney | Team Penske | Ford |
| 14 | Chase Briscoe | Stewart-Haas Racing | Ford |
| 15 | Joey Hand | Rick Ware Racing | Ford |
| 16 | A. J. Allmendinger (i) | Kaulig Racing | Chevrolet |
| 17 | Chris Buescher | RFK Racing | Ford |
| 18 | Kyle Busch | Joe Gibbs Racing | Toyota |
| 19 | Martin Truex Jr. | Joe Gibbs Racing | Toyota |
| 20 | Christopher Bell | Joe Gibbs Racing | Toyota |
| 21 | Harrison Burton (R) | Wood Brothers Racing | Ford |
| 22 | Joey Logano | Team Penske | Ford |
| 23 | Bubba Wallace | 23XI Racing | Toyota |
| 24 | William Byron | Hendrick Motorsports | Chevrolet |
| 26 | Daniil Kvyat | Team Hezeberg Powered by Reaume Brothers Racing | Toyota |
| 27 | Loris Hezemans (i) | Team Hezeberg Powered by Reaume Brothers Racing | Ford |
| 31 | Justin Haley | Kaulig Racing | Chevrolet |
| 34 | Michael McDowell | Front Row Motorsports | Ford |
| 38 | Todd Gilliland (R) | Front Row Motorsports | Ford |
| 41 | Cole Custer | Stewart-Haas Racing | Ford |
| 42 | Ty Dillon | Petty GMS Motorsports | Chevrolet |
| 43 | Erik Jones | Petty GMS Motorsports | Chevrolet |
| 45 | Ty Gibbs (i) | 23XI Racing | Toyota |
| 47 | Ricky Stenhouse Jr. | JTG Daugherty Racing | Chevrolet |
| 48 | Alex Bowman | Hendrick Motorsports | Chevrolet |
| 51 | Cody Ware | Rick Ware Racing | Ford |
| 77 | Mike Rockenfeller | Spire Motorsports | Chevrolet |
| 78 | Kyle Tilley | Live Fast Motorsports | Ford |
| 91 | Kimi Räikkönen | Trackhouse Racing Team | Chevrolet |
| 99 | Daniel Suárez | Trackhouse Racing Team | Chevrolet |
Official entry list

== Practice ==
Kyle Larson was the fastest in the practice session with a time of 1:11.293 seconds and a speed of 123.715 mph (199.100 km/h).

=== Practice results ===
| Pos | No. | Driver | Team | Manufacturer | Time | Speed |
|---|---|---|---|---|---|---|
| 1 | 5 | Kyle Larson | Hendrick Motorsports | Chevrolet | 1:11.293 | 123.715 |
| 2 | 9 | Chase Elliott | Hendrick Motorsports | Chevrolet | 1:11.308 | 123.689 |
| 3 | 16 | A. J. Allmendinger (i) | Kaulig Racing | Chevrolet | 1:11.438 | 123.464 |
Official practice results

== Qualifying ==
Chase Elliott scored the pole for the race with a time of 1:10.477 and a speed of 125.147 mph (201.405 km/h).

=== Qualifying results ===
| Pos | No. | Driver | Team | Manufacturer | R1 | R2 |
|---|---|---|---|---|---|---|
| 1 | 9 | Chase Elliott | Hendrick Motorsports | Chevrolet | 1:10.535 | 1:10.477 |
| 2 | 5 | Kyle Larson | Hendrick Motorsports | Chevrolet | 1:10.703 | 1:10.516 |
| 3 | 34 | Michael McDowell | Front Row Motorsports | Ford | 1:11.015 | 1:10.738 |
| 4 | 24 | William Byron | Hendrick Motorsports | Chevrolet | 1:10.872 | 1:10.811 |
| 5 | 8 | Tyler Reddick | Richard Childress Racing | Chevrolet | 1:10.880 | 1:10.837 |
| 6 | 16 | A. J. Allmendinger (i) | Kaulig Racing | Chevrolet | 1:11.002 | 1:10.980 |
| 7 | 17 | Chris Buescher | RFK Racing | Ford | 1:11.124 | 1:11.180 |
| 8 | 2 | Austin Cindric (R) | Team Penske | Ford | 1:11.093 | 1:11.335 |
| 9 | 99 | Daniel Suárez | Trackhouse Racing Team | Chevrolet | 1:11.149 | 1:11.496 |
| 10 | 18 | Kyle Busch | Joe Gibbs Racing | Toyota | 1:11.068 | 1:11.736 |
| 11 | 48 | Alex Bowman | Hendrick Motorsports | Chevrolet | 1:11.200 | — |
| 12 | 3 | Austin Dillon | Richard Childress Racing | Chevrolet | 1:11.215 | — |
| 13 | 31 | Justin Haley | Kaulig Racing | Chevrolet | 1:11.250 | — |
| 14 | 14 | Chase Briscoe | Stewart-Haas Racing | Ford | 1:11.259 | — |
| 15 | 6 | Brad Keselowski | RFK Racing | Ford | 1:11.259 | — |
| 16 | 45 | Ty Gibbs (i) | 23XI Racing | Toyota | 1:11.340 | — |
| 17 | 15 | Joey Hand | Rick Ware Racing | Ford | 1:11.350 | — |
| 18 | 1 | Ross Chastain | Trackhouse Racing Team | Chevrolet | 1:11.364 | — |
| 19 | 38 | Todd Gilliland (R) | Front Row Motorsports | Ford | 1:11.393 | — |
| 20 | 22 | Joey Logano | Team Penske | Ford | 1:11.434 | — |
| 21 | 47 | Ricky Stenhouse Jr. | JTG Daugherty Racing | Chevrolet | 1:11.435 | — |
| 22 | 11 | Denny Hamlin | Joe Gibbs Racing | Toyota | 1:11.442 | — |
| 23 | 23 | Bubba Wallace | 23XI Racing | Toyota | 1:11.443 | — |
| 24 | 4 | Kevin Harvick | Stewart-Haas Racing | Ford | 1:11.551 | — |
| 25 | 19 | Martin Truex Jr. | Joe Gibbs Racing | Toyota | 1:11.675 | — |
| 26 | 12 | Ryan Blaney | Team Penske | Ford | 1:11.783 | — |
| 27 | 91 | Kimi Räikkönen | Trackhouse Racing Team | Chevrolet | 1:11.824 | — |
| 28 | 42 | Ty Dillon | Petty GMS Motorsports | Chevrolet | 1:11.906 | — |
| 29 | 41 | Cole Custer | Stewart-Haas Racing | Ford | 1:11.958 | — |
| 30 | 21 | Harrison Burton (R) | Wood Brothers Racing | Ford | 1:12.033 | — |
| 31 | 43 | Erik Jones | Petty GMS Motorsports | Chevrolet | 1:12.359 | — |
| 32 | 7 | Corey LaJoie | Spire Motorsports | Chevrolet | 1:12.536 | — |
| 33 | 77 | Mike Rockenfeller | Spire Motorsports | Chevrolet | 1:12.583 | — |
| 34 | 27 | Loris Hezemans (i) | Team Hezeburg Powered by Reaume Brothers Racing | Ford | 1:12.737 | — |
| 35 | 10 | Aric Almirola | Stewart-Haas Racing | Ford | 1:12.959 | — |
| 36 | 26 | Daniil Kvyat | Team Hezeburg Powered by Reaume Brothers Racing | Toyota | 1:13.129 | — |
| 37 | 78 | Kyle Tilley | Live Fast Motorsports | Ford | 1:15.126 | — |
| 38 | 20 | Christopher Bell | Joe Gibbs Racing | Toyota | 0.000 | — |
| 39 | 51 | Cody Ware | Rick Ware Racing | Ford | 0.000 | — |
Official qualifying results

== Race ==
The race start was delayed due to lightning.

=== Stage results ===
Stage One Laps: 20

| Pos | No | Driver | Team | Manufacturer | Points |
|---|---|---|---|---|---|
| 1 | 14 | Chase Briscoe | Stewart-Haas Racing | Ford | 10 |
| 2 | 8 | Tyler Reddick | Richard Childress Racing | Chevrolet | 9 |
| 3 | 99 | Daniel Suárez | Trackhouse Racing Team | Chevrolet | 8 |
| 4 | 38 | Todd Gilliland (R) | Front Row Motorsports | Ford | 7 |
| 5 | 1 | Ross Chastain | Trackhouse Racing Team | Chevrolet | 6 |
| 6 | 22 | Joey Logano | Team Penske | Ford | 5 |
| 7 | 42 | Ty Dillon | Petty GMS Motorsports | Chevrolet | 4 |
| 8 | 34 | Michael McDowell | Front Row Motorsports | Ford | 3 |
| 9 | 18 | Kyle Busch | Joe Gibbs Racing | Toyota | 2 |
| 10 | 16 | A. J. Allmendinger (i) | Kaulig Racing | Chevrolet | 0 |
Official stage one results

Stage Two Laps: 20

| Pos | No | Driver | Team | Manufacturer | Points |
|---|---|---|---|---|---|
| 1 | 22 | Joey Logano | Team Penske | Ford | 10 |
| 2 | 18 | Kyle Busch | Joe Gibbs Racing | Toyota | 9 |
| 3 | 34 | Michael McDowell | Front Row Motorsports | Ford | 8 |
| 4 | 9 | Chase Elliott | Hendrick Motorsports | Chevrolet | 7 |
| 5 | 42 | Ty Dillon | Petty GMS Motorsports | Chevrolet | 6 |
| 6 | 15 | Joey Hand | Rick Ware Racing | Ford | 5 |
| 7 | 17 | Chris Buescher | RFK Racing | Ford | 4 |
| 8 | 5 | Kyle Larson | Hendrick Motorsports | Chevrolet | 3 |
| 9 | 41 | Cole Custer | Stewart-Haas Racing | Ford | 2 |
| 10 | 20 | Christopher Bell | Joe Gibbs Racing | Toyota | 1 |
Official stage two results

=== Final stage results ===
Stage Three Laps: 50

| Pos | Grid | No | Driver | Team | Manufacturer | Laps | Points |
|---|---|---|---|---|---|---|---|
| 1 | 2 | 5 | Kyle Larson | Hendrick Motorsports | Chevrolet | 90 | 43 |
| 2 | 6 | 16 | A. J. Allmendinger (i) | Kaulig Racing | Chevrolet | 90 | 0 |
| 3 | 20 | 22 | Joey Logano | Team Penske | Ford | 90 | 49 |
| 4 | 1 | 9 | Chase Elliott | Hendrick Motorsports | Chevrolet | 90 | 40 |
| 5 | 9 | 99 | Daniel Suárez | Trackhouse Racing Team | Chevrolet | 90 | 40 |
| 6 | 3 | 34 | Michael McDowell | Front Row Motorsports | Ford | 90 | 42 |
| 7 | 5 | 8 | Tyler Reddick | Richard Childress Racing | Chevrolet | 90 | 39 |
| 8 | 38 | 20 | Christopher Bell | Joe Gibbs Racing | Toyota | 90 | 30 |
| 9 | 7 | 17 | Chris Buescher | RFK Racing | Ford | 90 | 32 |
| 10 | 31 | 43 | Erik Jones | Petty GMS Motorsports | Chevrolet | 90 | 27 |
| 11 | 29 | 41 | Cole Custer | Stewart-Haas Racing | Ford | 90 | 28 |
| 12 | 24 | 4 | Kevin Harvick | Stewart-Haas Racing | Ford | 90 | 25 |
| 13 | 8 | 2 | Austin Cindric (R) | Team Penske | Ford | 90 | 24 |
| 14 | 21 | 47 | Ricky Stenhouse Jr. | JTG Daugherty Racing | Chevrolet | 90 | 23 |
| 15 | 11 | 48 | Alex Bowman | Hendrick Motorsports | Chevrolet | 90 | 22 |
| 16 | 28 | 42 | Ty Dillon | Petty GMS Motorsports | Chevrolet | 90 | 31 |
| 17 | 12 | 3 | Austin Dillon | Richard Childress Racing | Chevrolet | 90 | 20 |
| 18 | 13 | 31 | Justin Haley | Kaulig Racing | Chevrolet | 90 | 19 |
| 19 | 22 | 11 | Denny Hamlin | Joe Gibbs Racing | Toyota | 90 | 18 |
| 20 | 15 | 6 | Brad Keselowski | RFK Racing | Ford | 90 | 17 |
| 21 | 18 | 1 | Ross Chastain | Trackhouse Racing Team | Chevrolet | 90 | 22 |
| 22 | 4 | 24 | William Byron | Hendrick Motorsports | Chevrolet | 90 | 15 |
| 23 | 25 | 19 | Martin Truex Jr. | Joe Gibbs Racing | Toyota | 90 | 14 |
| 24 | 26 | 12 | Ryan Blaney | Team Penske | Ford | 90 | 13 |
| 25 | 14 | 14 | Chase Briscoe | Stewart-Haas Racing | Ford | 90 | 22 |
| 26 | 16 | 45 | Ty Gibbs (i) | 23XI Racing | Toyota | 90 | 0 |
| 27 | 32 | 7 | Corey LaJoie | Spire Motorsports | Chevrolet | 90 | 10 |
| 28 | 30 | 21 | Harrison Burton (R) | Wood Brothers Racing | Ford | 90 | 9 |
| 29 | 35 | 10 | Aric Almirola | Stewart-Haas Racing | Ford | 90 | 8 |
| 30 | 33 | 77 | Mike Rockenfeller | Spire Motorsports | Chevrolet | 90 | 7 |
| 31 | 17 | 15 | Joey Hand | Rick Ware Racing | Ford | 90 | 11 |
| 32 | 10 | 18 | Kyle Busch | Joe Gibbs Racing | Toyota | 89 | 16 |
| 33 | 34 | 27 | Loris Hezemans (i) | Team Hezeburg Powered by Reaume Brothers Racing | Ford | 89 | 0 |
| 34 | 39 | 51 | Cody Ware | Rick Ware Racing | Ford | 88 | 3 |
| 35 | 23 | 23 | Bubba Wallace | 23XI Racing | Toyota | 83 | 2 |
| 36 | 36 | 26 | Daniil Kvyat | Team Hezeburg Powered by Reaume Brothers Racing | Toyota | 58 | 1 |
| 37 | 27 | 91 | Kimi Räikkönen | Trackhouse Racing Team | Chevrolet | 44 | 1 |
| 38 | 19 | 38 | Todd Gilliland (R) | Front Row Motorsports | Ford | 28 | 8 |
| 39 | 37 | 78 | Kyle Tilley | Live Fast Motorsports | Ford | 15 | 1 |
Official race results

=== Race statistics ===
- Lead changes: 12 among 9 different drivers
- Cautions/Laps: 5 for 11
- Red flags: 0
- Time of race: 2 hours, 17 minutes and 52 seconds
- Average speed: 95.962 miles per hour (154.436 km/h)

== Media ==
=== Television ===
USA covered the race on the television side. as part of a Radio style Broadcast for the race. Rick Allen and Steve Letarte called the race from the broadcast booth. MRN broadcaster Mike Bagley called the race from the Esses, Dale Earnhardt Jr. had the call from Turn 5, and Jeff Burton had the call from a platform located off Turn 10 that covers Turns 6–7. Dave Burns, Parker Kligerman and Marty Snider handled the pit road duties from pit lane.

USA
| Booth announcers | Turn Announcers | Pit reporters |
|---|---|---|
| Lap-by-lap: Rick Allen; Color-commentator: Steve Letarte | Esses Announcer: Mike Bagley; Turn 5 Announcer: Dale Earnhardt Jr. Turn 6–7 Announcer: Jeff Burton | Dave Burns; Parker Kligerman; Marty Snider |

=== Radio ===
Motor Racing Network had the radio call for the race, which was simulcast on Sirius XM NASCAR Radio. Alex Hayden, Jeff Striegle, and former crew chief Todd Gordon covered the action when the field raced down the front straightaway. Dave Moody called the race when the field raced thru the esses. Kyle Rickey covered the action when the field raced thru the inner loop and turn 5 and Jason Toy covered the action in turn 10 & 11. Steve Post, Dillon Welch, Chris Wilner, and Kim Coon called the action from the pits for MRN.

MRN
| Booth announcers | Turn announcers | Pit reporters |
|---|---|---|
| Lead announcer: Alex Hayden; Announcer: Jeff Striegle; Announcer: Todd Gordon | Esses: Dave Moody; Inner loop & Turn 5: Kyle Rickey; Turn 10 & 11: Jason Toy | Steve Post; Dillon Welch; Chris Wilner; Kim Coon |

== Standings after the race ==
Drivers' Championship standings

| | Pos | Driver | Points |
|---|---|---|---|
| | 1 | Chase Elliott | 922 |
| 1 | 2 | Kyle Larson | 788 (–134) |
| 1 | 3 | Ryan Blaney | 779 (–143) |
| 2 | 4 | Joey Logano | 767 (–155) |
| | 5 | Ross Chastain | 761 (–161) |
| 2 | 6 | Martin Truex Jr. | 754 (–168) |
| | 7 | Christopher Bell | 733 (–189) |
| | 8 | Kevin Harvick | 690 (–232) |
| | 9 | Kyle Busch | 679 (–243) |
| | 10 | William Byron | 664 (–258) |
| | 11 | Alex Bowman | 615 (–307) |
| 1 | 12 | Daniel Suárez | 614 (–308) |
| 1 | 13 | Tyler Reddick | 602 (–320) |
| 2 | 14 | Denny Hamlin | 591 (–331) |
| | 15 | Austin Cindric | 580 (–342) |
| 1 | 16 | Chase Briscoe | 571 (–351) |
Official driver's standings

Manufacturers' Championship standings

| Pos | Manufacturer | Points |
|---|---|---|
| 1 | Chevrolet | 919 |
| 2 | Ford | 852 (–67) |
| 3 | Toyota | 829 (–90) |

- Note: Only the first 16 positions are included for the driver standings.
- . – Driver has clinched a position in the NASCAR Cup Series playoffs.

| Previous race: 2022 Federated Auto Parts 400 | NASCAR Cup Series; 2022 season | Next race: 2022 Coke Zero Sugar 400 |
