= 2022 Verizon 200 at the Brickyard =

NASCAR Cup Series race

Race details
- Race 22 of 36 in the 2022 NASCAR Cup Series
- The 2022 Verizon 200 at the Brickyard program cover.
- Date: July 31, 2022
- Location: Indianapolis Motor Speedway in Speedway, Indiana
- Course: Permanent racing facility
- Course length: 2.439 miles (3.925 km)
- Distance: 86 laps, 209.754 mi (337.55 km)
- Scheduled distance: 82 laps, 199.998 mi (321.85 km)
- Average speed: 75.511 miles per hour (121.523 km/h)

Pole position
Driver	Tyler Reddick	Richard Childress Racing
- Time: 88.354

Most laps led
Driver	Tyler Reddick	Richard Childress Racing
- Laps: 39

Winner
No. 8	Tyler Reddick	Richard Childress Racing

Television in the United States
- Network: NBC
- Announcers: Rick Allen, Jeff Burton, Steve Letarte and Dale Earnhardt Jr.
- Nielsen ratings: 2.05 (3,373,000 viewers)

Radio in the United States
- Radio: PRN; IMS Radio
- Booth announcers: Doug Rice, Mark Jaynes and Jeff Hammond
- Turn announcers: Nick Yeoman (Turns 1–4), Pat Patterson (Turns 5–9), Chris Denari (Turns 10–11) and Jake Query (Turns 12–14)

The 2022 Verizon 200 at the Brickyard was a NASCAR Cup Series race held on July 31, 2022, at Indianapolis Motor Speedway in Speedway, Indiana. It was the 2nd running of the Verizon 200 at the Brickyard on the road course, and officially the 29th edition of NASCAR at the speedway. Contested over 86 laps – extended from 82 laps due to an overtime finish, on the 2.439-mile (3.925 km) road course, it was the 22nd race of the 2022 NASCAR Cup Series season.

== Report ==
The layout of the Indianapolis Motor Speedway NASCAR used.

=== Background ===
The Indianapolis Motor Speedway, located in Speedway, Indiana, (an enclave suburb of Indianapolis) in the United States, is the home of the Indianapolis 500 and the Brickyard 400. It is located on the corner of 16th Street and Georgetown Road, approximately six miles (10 km) west of Downtown Indianapolis.

Constructed in 1909, it is the original speedway, the first racing facility so named. It has a permanent seating capacity estimated at 235,000 with infield seating raising capacity to an approximate 400,000. It is the highest-capacity sports venue in the world.

This will be the first official qualifying and race weekend in the Cup Series for Daniil Kvyat and also for Ty Gibbs. Gibbs made his Cup Series debut at Pocono following a medical disqualification of Kurt Busch, who remains under suspension by NASCAR as a result of concussion protocol following his Q2 crash at Pocono the previous week. Kvyat marked the first time a driver who was declared an Authorised Neutral Athlete was entered in a Cup race.

==== Entry list ====
- (R) denotes rookie driver.
- (i) denotes driver who is ineligible for series driver points.

No.	Driver	Team	Manufacturer
1	Ross Chastain	Trackhouse Racing Team	Chevrolet
2	Austin Cindric (R)	Team Penske	Ford
3	Austin Dillon	Richard Childress Racing	Chevrolet
4	Kevin Harvick	Stewart-Haas Racing	Ford
5	Kyle Larson	Hendrick Motorsports	Chevrolet
6	Brad Keselowski	RFK Racing	Ford
7	Corey LaJoie	Spire Motorsports	Chevrolet
8	Tyler Reddick	Richard Childress Racing	Chevrolet
9	Chase Elliott	Hendrick Motorsports	Chevrolet
10	Aric Almirola	Stewart-Haas Racing	Ford
11	Denny Hamlin	Joe Gibbs Racing	Toyota
12	Ryan Blaney	Team Penske	Ford
14	Chase Briscoe	Stewart-Haas Racing	Ford
15	Joey Hand	Rick Ware Racing	Ford
16	A. J. Allmendinger (i)	Kaulig Racing	Chevrolet
17	Chris Buescher	RFK Racing	Ford
18	Kyle Busch	Joe Gibbs Racing	Toyota
19	Martin Truex Jr.	Joe Gibbs Racing	Toyota
20	Christopher Bell	Joe Gibbs Racing	Toyota
21	Harrison Burton (R)	Wood Brothers Racing	Ford
22	Joey Logano	Team Penske	Ford
23	Bubba Wallace	23XI Racing	Toyota
24	William Byron	Hendrick Motorsports	Chevrolet
26	Daniil Kvyat	Team Hezeberg Powered by Reaume Brothers Racing	Toyota
27	Loris Hezemans (i)	Team Hezeberg Powered by Reaume Brothers Racing	Ford
31	Justin Haley	Kaulig Racing	Chevrolet
34	Michael McDowell	Front Row Motorsports	Ford
38	Todd Gilliland (R)	Front Row Motorsports	Ford
41	Cole Custer	Stewart-Haas Racing	Ford
42	Ty Dillon	Petty GMS Motorsports	Chevrolet
43	Erik Jones	Petty GMS Motorsports	Chevrolet
45	Ty Gibbs (i) (Note: Kurt Busch was medically disqualified (concussion) July 24 from the M&M's Fan Appreciation 400 after a qualifying crash in Q2 and after evaluation, it was announced on July 27, 2022 that his medical suspension will continue to Indianapolis.)	23XI Racing	Toyota
47	Ricky Stenhouse Jr.	JTG Daugherty Racing	Chevrolet
48	Alex Bowman	Hendrick Motorsports	Chevrolet
51	Cody Ware	Rick Ware Racing	Ford
77	Josh Bilicki (i)	Spire Motorsports	Chevrolet
78	Josh Williams (i)	Live Fast Motorsports	Ford
99	Daniel Suárez	Trackhouse Racing Team	Chevrolet
Official entry list

== Practice ==
Austin Cindric was the fastest in the practice session with a time of 1:29.171 seconds and a speed of 98.468 mph (158.469 km/h).

=== Practice results ===
Pos	No.	Driver	Team	Manufacturer	Time	Speed
1	2	Austin Cindric (R)	Team Penske	Ford	1:29.171	98.467
2	99	Daniel Suárez	Trackhouse Racing Team	Chevrolet	1:29.273	98.355
3	12	Ryan Blaney	Team Penske	Ford	1:29.442	98.169
Official practice results

== Qualifying ==
Tyler Reddick scored the pole for the race with a time of 88.354 and a speed of 99.378 mph (159.933 km/h).

=== Qualifying results ===
Pos	No.	Driver	Team	Manufacturer	R1	R2
1	8	Tyler Reddick	Richard Childress Racing	Chevrolet	88.724	88.354
2	2	Austin Cindric (R)	Team Penske	Ford	88.671	88.606
3	14	Chase Briscoe	Stewart-Haas Racing	Ford	88.608	88.725
4	20	Christopher Bell	Joe Gibbs Racing	Toyota	89.223	88.942
5	22	Joey Logano	Team Penske	Ford	88.739	89.163
6	12	Ryan Blaney	Team Penske	Ford	89.021	89.192
7	34	Michael McDowell	Front Row Motorsports	Ford	89.178	89.295
8	9	Chase Elliott	Hendrick Motorsports	Chevrolet	89.146	89.390
9	38	Todd Gilliland (R)	Front Row Motorsports	Ford	88.803	89.592
10	18	Kyle Busch	Joe Gibbs Racing	Toyota	88.849	90.121
11	99	Daniel Suárez	Trackhouse Racing Team	Chevrolet	89.187	—
12	6	Brad Keselowski	RFK Racing	Ford	89.195	—
13	21	Harrison Burton (R)	Wood Brothers Racing	Ford	89.215	—
14	10	Aric Almirola	Stewart-Haas Racing	Ford	89.223	—
15	11	Denny Hamlin	Joe Gibbs Racing	Toyota	89.227	—
16	17	Chris Buescher	RFK Racing	Ford	89.282	—
17	31	Justin Haley	Kaulig Racing	Chevrolet	89.285	—
18	4	Kevin Harvick	Stewart-Haas Racing	Ford	89.290	—
19	23	Bubba Wallace	23XI Racing	Toyota	89.331	—
20	16	A. J. Allmendinger (i)	Kaulig Racing	Chevrolet	89.368	—
21	1	Ross Chastain	Trackhouse Racing Team	Chevrolet	89.386	—
22	5	Kyle Larson	Hendrick Motorsports	Chevrolet	89.392	—
23	24	William Byron	Hendrick Motorsports	Chevrolet	89.506	—
24	41	Cole Custer	Stewart-Haas Racing	Ford	89.605	—
25	19	Martin Truex Jr.	Joe Gibbs Racing	Toyota	89.606	—
26	45	Ty Gibbs (i)	23XI Racing	Toyota	89.653	—
27	15	Joey Hand	Rick Ware Racing	Ford	89.660	—
28	48	Alex Bowman	Hendrick Motorsports	Chevrolet	90.005	—
29	3	Austin Dillon	Richard Childress Racing	Chevrolet	90.061	—
30	42	Ty Dillon	Petty GMS Motorsports	Chevrolet	90.196	—
31	7	Corey LaJoie	Spire Motorsports	Chevrolet	90.634	—
32	77	Josh Bilicki (i)	Spire Motorsports	Chevrolet	91.039	—
33	51	Cody Ware	Rick Ware Racing	Ford	91.311	—
34	27	Loris Hezemans (i)	Team Hezeberg Powered by Reaume Brothers Racing	Ford	91.495	—
35	43	Erik Jones	Petty GMS Motorsports	Chevrolet	91.504	—
36	26	Daniil Kvyat	Team Hezeberg Powered by Reaume Brothers Racing	Toyota	91.942	—
37	78	Josh Williams (i)	Live Fast Motorsports	Ford	94.088	—
38	47	Ricky Stenhouse Jr.	JTG Daugherty Racing	Chevrolet	103.335	—
Official qualifying results

== Race ==
=== Stage Results ===
Stage One Laps: 15

Pos	No	Driver	Team	Manufacturer	Points
1	14	Chase Briscoe	Stewart-Haas Racing	Ford	10
2	12	Ryan Blaney	Team Penske	Ford	9
3	24	William Byron	Hendrick Motorsports	Chevrolet	8
4	22	Joey Logano	Team Penske	Ford	7
5	9	Chase Elliott	Hendrick Motorsports	Chevrolet	6
6	38	Todd Gilliland (R)	Front Row Motorsports	Ford	5
7	5	Kyle Larson	Hendrick Motorsports	Chevrolet	4
8	18	Kyle Busch	Joe Gibbs Racing	Toyota	3
9	21	Harrison Burton (R)	Wood Brothers Racing	Ford	2
10	19	Martin Truex Jr.	Joe Gibbs Racing	Toyota	1
Official stage one results

Stage Two Laps: 20

Pos	No	Driver	Team	Manufacturer	Points
1	20	Christopher Bell	Joe Gibbs Racing	Toyota	10
2	18	Kyle Busch	Joe Gibbs Racing	Toyota	9
3	23	Bubba Wallace	23XI Racing	Toyota	8
4	9	Chase Elliott	Hendrick Motorsports	Chevrolet	7
5	42	Ty Dillon	Petty GMS Motorsports	Chevrolet	6
6	11	Denny Hamlin	Joe Gibbs Racing	Toyota	5
7	14	Chase Briscoe	Stewart-Haas Racing	Ford	4
8	41	Cole Custer	Stewart-Haas Racing	Ford	3
9	43	Erik Jones	Petty GMS Motorsports	Chevrolet	2
10	51	Cody Ware	Rick Ware Racing	Ford	1
Official stage two results

=== Final Stage Results ===
Stage Three Laps: 47

Pos	Grid	No	Driver	Team	Manufacturer	Laps	Points
1	1	8	Tyler Reddick	Richard Childress Racing	Chevrolet	86	40
2	2	2	Austin Cindric (R)	Team Penske	Ford	86	35
3	13	21	Harrison Burton (R)	Wood Brothers Racing	Ford	86	36
4	9	38	Todd Gilliland (R)	Front Row Motorsports	Ford	86	38
5	19	23	Bubba Wallace	23XI Racing	Toyota	86	40
6	5	22	Joey Logano	Team Penske	Ford	86	38
7	20	16	A. J. Allmendinger (i)	Kaulig Racing	Chevrolet	86	0
8	7	34	Michael McDowell	Front Row Motorsports	Ford	86	29
9	24	41	Cole Custer	Stewart-Haas Racing	Ford	86	31
10	16	17	Chris Buescher	RFK Racing	Ford	86	27
11	10	18	Kyle Busch	Joe Gibbs Racing	Toyota	86	38
12	4	20	Christopher Bell	Joe Gibbs Racing	Toyota	86	35
13	38	47	Ricky Stenhouse Jr.	JTG Daugherty Racing	Chevrolet	86	24
14	15	11	Denny Hamlin	Joe Gibbs Racing	Toyota	86	28
15	35	43	Erik Jones	Petty GMS Motorsports	Chevrolet	86	24
16	8	9	Chase Elliott	Hendrick Motorsports	Chevrolet	86	34
17	26	45	Ty Gibbs (i)	23XI Racing	Toyota	86	0
18	31	7	Corey LaJoie	Spire Motorsports	Chevrolet	86	19
19	17	31	Justin Haley	Kaulig Racing	Chevrolet	86	18
20	12	6	Brad Keselowski	RFK Racing	Ford	86	17
21	25	19	Martin Truex Jr.	Joe Gibbs Racing	Toyota	86	17
22	32	77	Josh Bilicki (i)	Spire Motorsports	Chevrolet	86	0
23	3	14	Chase Briscoe	Stewart-Haas Racing	Ford	86	28
24	33	51	Cody Ware	Rick Ware Racing	Ford	86	14
25	37	78	Josh Williams (i)	Live Fast Motorsports	Ford	86	0
26	6	12	Ryan Blaney	Team Penske	Ford	86	20
27	21	1	Ross Chastain (Note: Chastain (crossing the finish line second) and Austin Dillon received 30-second penalties for using an access road next to the turn 1 as a shortcut.)	Trackhouse Racing Team	Chevrolet	86	10
28	11	99	Daniel Suárez	Trackhouse Racing Team	Chevrolet	86	9
29	27	15	Joey Hand	Rick Ware Racing	Ford	85	8
30	29	3	Austin Dillon	Richard Childress Racing	Chevrolet	85	7
31	23	24	William Byron	Hendrick Motorsports	Chevrolet	79	14
32	28	48	Alex Bowman	Hendrick Motorsports	Chevrolet	65	5
33	18	4	Kevin Harvick	Stewart-Haas Racing	Ford	64	4
34	30	42	Ty Dillon	Petty GMS Motorsports	Chevrolet	60	9
35	22	5	Kyle Larson	Hendrick Motorsports	Chevrolet	57	6
36	36	26	Daniil Kvyat (Note: Daniil Kvyat is Russian, but he competes as a neutral competitor as Russian national emblems were banned by the association due to the 2022 Russian invasion of Ukraine.)	Team Hezeberg Powered by Reaume Brothers Racing	Toyota	43	1
37	34	27	Loris Hezemans (i)	Team Hezeberg Powered by Reaume Brothers Racing	Ford	34	0
38	14	10	Aric Almirola	Stewart-Haas Racing	Ford	24	1
Official race results

=== Race statistics ===
- Lead changes: 9 among 7 different drivers
- Cautions/Laps: 5 for 15
- Red flags: 0
- Time of race: 2 hours, 40 minutes and 18 seconds
- Average speed: 75.511 miles per hour (121.523 km/h)

== Media ==
=== Television ===
NBC Sports covered the race on the television side. Rick Allen, Jeff Burton, Steve Letarte, and Dale Earnhardt Jr. called the race from the broadcast booth. Dave Burns, Parker Kligerman, and Marty Snider handled the pit road duties from pit lane. Rutledge Wood served as a “CityView” reporter and share stories from the track.

NBC
Booth announcers	Pit reporters	CityView reporter
Lap-by-lap: Rick Allen; Color-commentator: Jeff Burton; Color-commentator: Steve Letarte; Color-commentator: Dale Earnhardt Jr.	Dave Burns; Parker Kligerman; Marty Snider	Rutledge Wood

=== Radio ===
Indianapolis Motor Speedway Radio Network and the Performance Racing Network jointly co-produce the radio broadcast for the race, which was simulcast on Sirius XM NASCAR Radio, and aired on IMS or PRN stations, depending on contractual obligations. The lead announcers and two pit reporters were PRN staff, while the turns announcers and two pit reporters were from IMS.

PRN/IMS Radio
Booth announcers	Turn announcers	Pit reporters
Lead announcer: Doug Rice; Announcer: Mark Jaynes; Announcer: Jeff Hammond	Turns 1–4: Nick Yeoman; Turns 5–9: Pat Patterson; Turns 10–11: Chris Denari; Turns 12–14: Jake Query	Brad Gillie; Brett McMillan; Ryan Myrehn; Michael Young

== Standings after the race ==
Drivers' Championship standings

	Pos	Driver	Points
	1	Chase Elliott	821
1	2	Ryan Blaney	696 (–125)
1	3	Ross Chastain	692 (–129)
1	4	Martin Truex Jr.	671 (–150)
1	5	Kyle Larson	667 (–154)
	6	Christopher Bell	640 (–181)
	7	Joey Logano	637 (–184)
	8	Kyle Busch	633 (–188)
	9	William Byron	586 (–235)
	10	Kevin Harvick	575 (–246)
3	11	Tyler Reddick	549 (–272)
1	12	Alex Bowman	541 (–280)
1	13	Daniel Suárez	535 (–286)
1	14	Austin Cindric	530 (–291)
1	15	Chase Briscoe	515 (–306)
3	16	Aric Almirola	515 (–306)
Official driver's standings

Manufacturers' Championship standings

Pos	Manufacturer	Points
1	Chevrolet	817
2	Ford	738 (–79)
3	Toyota	730 (–87)

- Note: Only the first 16 positions are included for the driver standings.
- . – Driver has clinched a position in the NASCAR Cup Series playoffs.

== Notes ==
Previous race: 2022 M&M's Fan Appreciation 400	NASCAR Cup Series; 2022 season	Next race: 2022 FireKeepers Casino 400
