= 2022 FireKeepers Casino 400 =

NASCAR Cup Series race

Race details
- Race 23 of 36 in the 2022 NASCAR Cup Series
- The 2022 FireKeepers Casino 400 program cover.
- Date: August 7, 2022
- Location: Michigan International Speedway in Brooklyn, Michigan
- Course: Permanent racing facility
- Course length: 2.0 miles (3.2 km)
- Distance: 200 laps, 400 mi (640 km)
- Average speed: 137.825 miles per hour (221.808 km/h)

Pole position
Driver	Bubba Wallace	23XI Racing
- Time: 37.755

Most laps led
Driver	Denny Hamlin; Kevin Harvick	Joe Gibbs Racing; Stewart-Haas Racing
- Laps: 38

Winner
No. 4	Kevin Harvick	Stewart-Haas Racing

Television in the United States
- Network: USA
- Announcers: Dale Earnhardt Jr., Jeff Burton and Steve Letarte
- Nielsen ratings: 1.54 (2,621,000 viewers)

Radio in the United States
- Radio: MRN
- Booth announcers: Alex Hayden and Jeff Striegle
- Turn announcers: Dave Moody (1–2) and Kyle Rickey (3–4)

The 2022 FireKeepers Casino 400 was a NASCAR Cup Series race held on August 7, 2022, at Michigan International Speedway in Brooklyn, Michigan. Contested over 200 laps on the two-mile (3.2 km) D-shaped oval, it was the 23rd race of the 2022 NASCAR Cup Series season.

== Report ==
=== Background ===
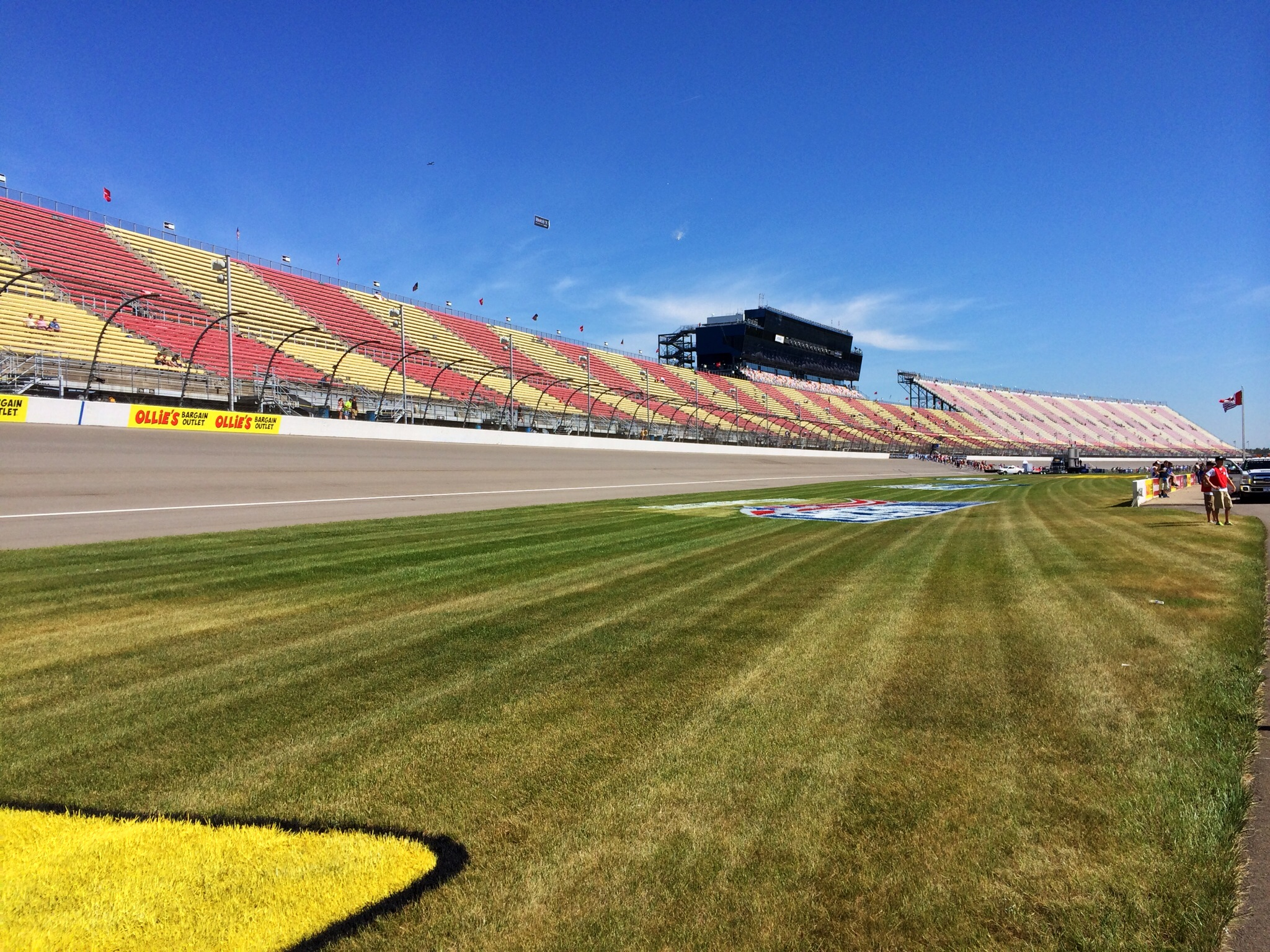
Michigan International Speedway, the track where the race was held.

The race was held at Michigan International Speedway, a two-mile (3.2 km) moderate-banked D-shaped speedway located in Brooklyn, Michigan. The track is used primarily for NASCAR events. It is known as a "sister track" to Texas World Speedway as MIS's oval design was a direct basis of TWS, with moderate modifications to the banking in the corners, and was used as the basis of Auto Club Speedway. The track is owned by International Speedway Corporation. Michigan International Speedway is recognized as one of motorsports' premier facilities because of its wide racing surface and high banking (by open-wheel standards; the 18-degree banking is modest by stock car standards).

Prior to the race, it was announced Kurt Busch remains under medical suspension following his crash during second-round qualifying at Pocono. Ty Gibbs will remain in the 45 car.

==== Entry list ====
- (R) denotes rookie driver.
- (i) denotes driver who is ineligible for series driver points.

No.	Driver	Team	Manufacturer
1	Ross Chastain	Trackhouse Racing Team	Chevrolet
2	Austin Cindric (R)	Team Penske	Ford
3	Austin Dillon	Richard Childress Racing	Chevrolet
4	Kevin Harvick	Stewart-Haas Racing	Ford
5	Kyle Larson	Hendrick Motorsports	Chevrolet
6	Brad Keselowski	RFK Racing	Ford
7	Corey LaJoie	Spire Motorsports	Chevrolet
8	Tyler Reddick	Richard Childress Racing	Chevrolet
9	Chase Elliott	Hendrick Motorsports	Chevrolet
10	Aric Almirola	Stewart-Haas Racing	Ford
11	Denny Hamlin	Joe Gibbs Racing	Toyota
12	Ryan Blaney	Team Penske	Ford
14	Chase Briscoe	Stewart-Haas Racing	Ford
15	J. J. Yeley (i)	Rick Ware Racing	Ford
16	Noah Gragson (i)	Kaulig Racing	Chevrolet
17	Chris Buescher	RFK Racing	Ford
18	Kyle Busch	Joe Gibbs Racing	Toyota
19	Martin Truex Jr.	Joe Gibbs Racing	Toyota
20	Christopher Bell	Joe Gibbs Racing	Toyota
21	Harrison Burton (R)	Wood Brothers Racing	Ford
22	Joey Logano	Team Penske	Ford
23	Bubba Wallace	23XI Racing	Toyota
24	William Byron	Hendrick Motorsports	Chevrolet
31	Justin Haley	Kaulig Racing	Chevrolet
33	Austin Hill (i)	Richard Childress Racing	Chevrolet
34	Michael McDowell	Front Row Motorsports	Ford
38	Todd Gilliland (R)	Front Row Motorsports	Ford
41	Cole Custer	Stewart-Haas Racing	Ford
42	Ty Dillon	Petty GMS Motorsports	Chevrolet
43	Erik Jones	Petty GMS Motorsports	Chevrolet
45	Ty Gibbs (i)	23XI Racing	Toyota
47	Ricky Stenhouse Jr.	JTG Daugherty Racing	Chevrolet
48	Alex Bowman	Hendrick Motorsports	Chevrolet
51	Cody Ware	Rick Ware Racing	Ford
77	Josh Bilicki (i)	Spire Motorsports	Chevrolet
78	B. J. McLeod (i)	Live Fast Motorsports	Ford
99	Daniel Suárez	Trackhouse Racing Team	Chevrolet
Official entry list

== Practice ==
Kyle Busch was the fastest in the practice session with a time of 38.138 seconds and a speed of 188.788 mph (303.825 km/h).

=== Practice results ===
Pos	No.	Driver	Team	Manufacturer	Time	Speed
1	18	Kyle Busch	Joe Gibbs Racing	Toyota	38.138	188.788
2	23	Bubba Wallace	23XI Racing	Toyota	38.210	188.432
3	11	Denny Hamlin	Joe Gibbs Racing	Toyota	38.298	187.999
Official practice results

== Qualifying ==
Bubba Wallace scored the pole for the race with a time of 37.755 and a speed of 190.703 mph (306.907 km/h). This was his first career pole in the Cup Series.

=== Qualifying results ===
Pos	No.	Driver	Team	Manufacturer	R1	R2
1	23	Bubba Wallace	23XI Racing	Toyota	37.902	37.755
2	20	Christopher Bell	Joe Gibbs Racing	Toyota	37.905	37.915
3	18	Kyle Busch	Joe Gibbs Racing	Toyota	37.890	37.921
4	22	Joey Logano	Team Penske	Ford	38.050	37.993
5	2	Austin Cindric (R)	Team Penske	Ford	38.070	38.005
6	8	Tyler Reddick	Richard Childress Racing	Chevrolet	38.074	38.090
7	19	Martin Truex Jr.	Joe Gibbs Racing	Toyota	38.122	38.151
8	5	Kyle Larson	Hendrick Motorsports	Chevrolet	38.051	38.175
9	11	Denny Hamlin	Joe Gibbs Racing	Toyota	38.041	38.209
10	43	Erik Jones	Petty GMS Motorsports	Chevrolet	38.237	38.336
11	45	Ty Gibbs (i)	23XI Racing	Toyota	38.218	—
12	16	Noah Gragson (i)	Kaulig Racing	Chevrolet	38.248	—
13	9	Chase Elliott	Hendrick Motorsports	Chevrolet	38.270	—
14	34	Michael McDowell	Front Row Motorsports	Ford	38.287	—
15	99	Daniel Suárez	Trackhouse Racing Team	Chevrolet	38.306	—
16	4	Kevin Harvick	Stewart-Haas Racing	Ford	38.333	—
17	41	Cole Custer	Stewart-Haas Racing	Ford	38.380	—
18	10	Aric Almirola	Stewart-Haas Racing	Ford	38.385	—
19	17	Chris Buescher	RFK Racing	Ford	38.448	—
20	24	William Byron	Hendrick Motorsports	Chevrolet	38.463	—
21	31	Justin Haley	Kaulig Racing	Chevrolet	38.482	—
22	1	Ross Chastain	Trackhouse Racing Team	Chevrolet	38.502	—
23	14	Chase Briscoe	Stewart-Haas Racing	Ford	38.526	—
24	12	Ryan Blaney	Team Penske	Ford	38.551	—
25	42	Ty Dillon	Petty GMS Motorsports	Chevrolet	38.617	—
26	3	Austin Dillon	Richard Childress Racing	Chevrolet	38.639	—
27	21	Harrison Burton (R)	Wood Brothers Racing	Ford	38.641	—
28	47	Ricky Stenhouse Jr.	JTG Daugherty Racing	Chevrolet	38.697	—
29	15	J. J. Yeley (i)	Rick Ware Racing	Ford	38.803	—
30	48	Alex Bowman	Hendrick Motorsports	Chevrolet	38.814	—
31	33	Austin Hill (i)	Richard Childress Racing	Chevrolet	38.875	—
32	7	Corey LaJoie	Spire Motorsports	Chevrolet	38.940	—
33	6	Brad Keselowski	RFK Racing	Ford	38.997	—
34	51	Cody Ware	Rick Ware Racing	Ford	39.021	—
35	78	B. J. McLeod (i)	Live Fast Motorsports	Ford	39.308	—
36	77	Josh Bilicki (i)	Spire Motorsports	Chevrolet	39.308	—
37	38	Todd Gilliland (R)	Front Row Motorsports	Ford	39.317	—
Official qualifying results

== Race ==
=== Stage Results ===
Stage One Laps: 45

Pos	No	Driver	Team	Manufacturer	Points
1	20	Christopher Bell	Joe Gibbs Racing	Toyota	10
2	11	Denny Hamlin	Joe Gibbs Racing	Toyota	9
3	43	Erik Jones	Petty GMS Motorsports	Chevrolet	8
4	19	Martin Truex Jr.	Joe Gibbs Racing	Toyota	7
5	17	Chris Buescher	RFK Racing	Ford	6
6	1	Ross Chastain	Trackhouse Racing Team	Chevrolet	5
7	24	William Byron	Hendrick Motorsports	Chevrolet	4
8	4	Kevin Harvick	Stewart-Haas Racing	Ford	3
9	22	Joey Logano	Team Penske	Ford	2
10	14	Chase Briscoe	Stewart-Haas Racing	Ford	1
Official stage one results

Stage Two Laps: 75

Pos	No	Driver	Team	Manufacturer	Points
1	11	Denny Hamlin	Joe Gibbs Racing	Toyota	10
2	99	Daniel Suárez	Trackhouse Racing Team	Chevrolet	9
3	5	Kyle Larson	Hendrick Motorsports	Chevrolet	8
4	20	Christopher Bell	Joe Gibbs Racing	Toyota	7
5	6	Brad Keselowski	RFK Racing	Ford	6
6	43	Erik Jones	Petty GMS Motorsports	Chevrolet	5
7	3	Austin Dillon	Richard Childress Racing	Chevrolet	4
8	48	Alex Bowman	Hendrick Motorsports	Chevrolet	3
9	24	William Byron	Hendrick Motorsports	Chevrolet	2
10	22	Joey Logano	Team Penske	Ford	1
Official stage two results

=== Final Stage Results ===
Stage Three Laps: 80

Pos	Grid	No	Driver	Team	Manufacturer	Laps	Points
1	16	4	Kevin Harvick	Stewart-Haas Racing	Ford	200	43
2	1	23	Bubba Wallace	23XI Racing	Toyota	200	35
3	9	11	Denny Hamlin	Joe Gibbs Racing	Toyota	200	53
4	4	22	Joey Logano	Team Penske	Ford	200	34
5	7	19	Martin Truex Jr.	Joe Gibbs Racing	Toyota	200	38
6	24	12	Ryan Blaney	Team Penske	Ford	200	31
7	8	5	Kyle Larson	Hendrick Motorsports	Chevrolet	200	38
8	10	43	Erik Jones	Petty GMS Motorsports	Chevrolet	200	42
9	30	48	Alex Bowman	Hendrick Motorsports	Chevrolet	200	31
10	11	45	Ty Gibbs (i)	23XI Racing	Toyota	200	0
11	13	9	Chase Elliott	Hendrick Motorsports	Chevrolet	200	26
12	20	24	William Byron	Hendrick Motorsports	Chevrolet	200	31
13	26	3	Austin Dillon	Richard Childress Racing	Chevrolet	200	28
14	25	42	Ty Dillon	Petty GMS Motorsports	Chevrolet	200	23
15	33	6	Brad Keselowski	RFK Racing	Ford	200	28
16	19	17	Chris Buescher	RFK Racing	Ford	200	27
17	21	31	Justin Haley	Kaulig Racing	Chevrolet	200	20
18	31	33	Austin Hill (i)	Richard Childress Racing	Chevrolet	200	0
19	32	7	Corey LaJoie	Spire Motorsports	Chevrolet	200	18
20	23	14	Chase Briscoe	Stewart-Haas Racing	Ford	200	18
21	36	77	Josh Bilicki (i)	Spire Motorsports	Chevrolet	200	0
22	34	51	Cody Ware	Rick Ware Racing	Ford	200	15
23	35	78	B. J. McLeod (i)	Live Fast Motorsports	Ford	199	0
24	22	1	Ross Chastain	Trackhouse Racing Team	Chevrolet	199	18
25	15	99	Daniel Suárez	Trackhouse Racing Team	Chevrolet	198	21
26	2	20	Christopher Bell	Joe Gibbs Racing	Toyota	193	28
27	37	38	Todd Gilliland (R)	Front Row Motorsports	Ford	188	10
28	14	34	Michael McDowell	Front Row Motorsports	Ford	187	9
29	6	8	Tyler Reddick	Richard Childress Racing	Chevrolet	110	8
30	12	16	Noah Gragson (i)	Kaulig Racing	Chevrolet	109	0
31	17	41	Cole Custer	Stewart-Haas Racing	Ford	94	6
32	27	21	Harrison Burton (R)	Wood Brothers Racing	Ford	29	5
33	28	47	Ricky Stenhouse Jr.	JTG Daugherty Racing	Chevrolet	25	4
34	18	10	Aric Almirola	Stewart-Haas Racing	Ford	25	3
35	29	15	J. J. Yeley (i)	Rick Ware Racing	Ford	24	0
36	3	18	Kyle Busch	Joe Gibbs Racing	Toyota	24	1
37	5	2	Austin Cindric (R)	Team Penske	Ford	24	1
Official race results

=== Race statistics ===
- Lead changes: 15 among 10 different drivers
- Cautions/Laps: 7 for 36
- Red flags: 0
- Time of race: 2 hours, 54 minutes and 8 seconds
- Average speed: 137.825 miles per hour (221.808 km/h)

== Media ==
=== Television ===
USA covered the race on the television side. two-time Michigan winner, Dale Earnhardt Jr., Jeff Burton and Steve Letarte called the race from the broadcast booth. Kim Coon, Parker Kligerman and Marty Snider handled the pit road duties from pit lane.

USA
Booth announcers	Pit reporters
Lap-by-lap: Dale Earnhardt Jr. Color-commentator: Jeff Burton; Color-commentator: Steve Letarte	Kim Coon; Parker Kligerman; Marty Snider

=== Radio ===
Radio coverage of the race was broadcast by Motor Racing Network (MRN) and simulcast on Sirius XM NASCAR Radio. Alex Hayden and Jeff Striegle called the race in the booth while the field was racing on the front stretch. Dave Moody called the race from a billboard outside of turn 2 when the field is racing through turns 1 and 2. Mike Bagley called the race from a platform outside of turn 3 when the field races through turns 3 and 4. Steve Post, Chris Wilner, Dillon Welch and Jason Toy worked pit road for the radio side.

MRN
Booth announcers	Turn announcers	Pit reporters
Lead announcer: Alex Hayden; Announcer: Jeff Striegle	Turns 1 & 2: Dave Moody; Turns 3 & 4: Mike Bagley	Steve Post; Chris Wilner; Dillon Welch; Jason Toy

== Standings after the race ==
Drivers' Championship standings

	Pos	Driver	Points
	1	Chase Elliott	847
	2	Ryan Blaney	728 (–119)
	3	Ross Chastain	710 (–137)
	4	Martin Truex Jr.	709 (–138)
	5	Kyle Larson	705 (–142)
1	6	Joey Logano	673 (–174)
1	7	Christopher Bell	668 (–179)
	8	Kyle Busch	634 (–213)
1	9	Kevin Harvick	618 (–229)
1	10	William Byron	617 (–230)
1	11	Alex Bowman	572 (–275)
1	12	Tyler Reddick	557 (–290)
	13	Daniel Suárez	556 (–291)
3	14	Erik Jones	538 (–309)
	15	Chase Briscoe	533 (–314)
2	16	Austin Cindric	531 (–316)
Official driver's standings

Manufacturers' Championship standings

Pos	Manufacturer	Points
1	Chevrolet	847
2	Ford	778 (–69)
3	Toyota	765 (–82)

- Note: Only the first 16 positions are included for the driver standings.
- . – Driver has clinched a position in the NASCAR Cup Series playoffs.

Previous race: 2022 Verizon 200 at the Brickyard	NASCAR Cup Series; 2022 season	Next race: 2022 Federated Auto Parts 400
