= 2022 Federated Auto Parts 400 =

NASCAR Cup Series race

Race details
- Race 24 of 36 in the 2022 NASCAR Cup Series
- The 2022 Federated Auto Parts 400 program cover.
- Date: August 14, 2022
- Location: Richmond Raceway in Richmond, Virginia
- Course: Permanent racing facility
- Course length: .75 miles (1.2 km)
- Distance: 400 laps, 300 mi (480 km)
- Weather: 79–82 °F (26–28 °C); Partly cloudy
- Average speed: 98.11 miles per hour (157.89 km/h)

Pole position
Driver	Kyle Larson	Hendrick Motorsports
- Time: 23.042

Most laps led
Driver	Joey Logano	Team Penske
- Laps: 222

Winner
No. 4	Kevin Harvick	Stewart-Haas Racing

Television in the United States
- Network: USA
- Announcers: Rick Allen, Jeff Burton, Steve Letarte, and Dale Earnhardt Jr.
- Nielsen ratings: 2,432,000 viewers

Radio in the United States
- Radio: MRN
- Booth announcers: Alex Hayden and Jeff Striegle
- Turn announcers: Dave Moody (Backstretch)

The 2022 Federated Auto Parts 400 was a NASCAR Cup Series race held on August 14, 2022, at Richmond Raceway in Richmond, Virginia. Contested over 400 laps on the .75-mile (1.21 km) D-shaped short track, it was the 24th race of the 2022 NASCAR Cup Series season and was won by Kevin Harvick of Stewart-Haas Racing, the 60th and final win of his NASCAR Cup Series career.

== Report ==
=== Background ===
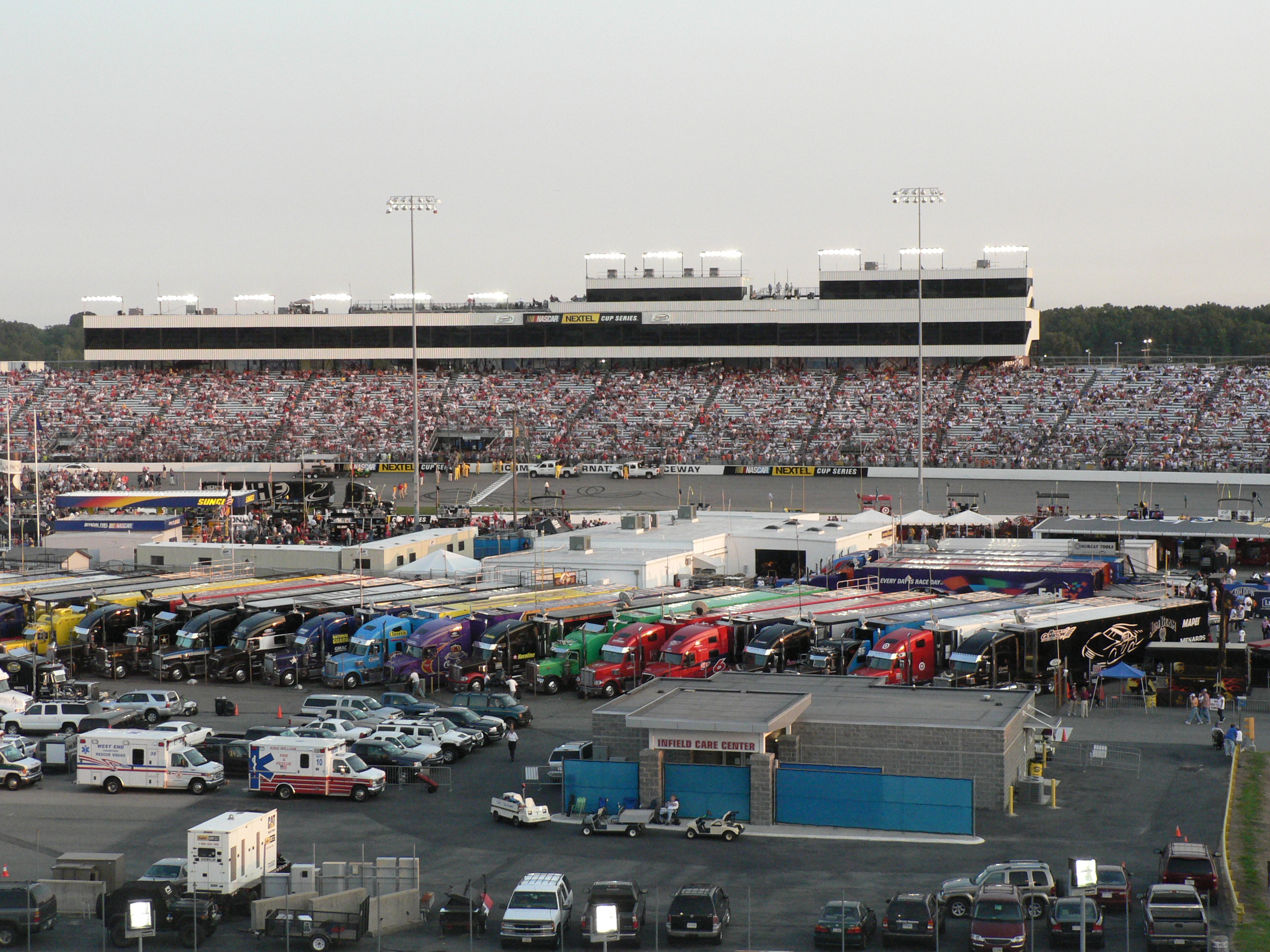
Richmond Raceway, the track where the race was held.

Richmond Raceway (RR), formerly known as Richmond International Raceway (RIR), is a 3/4-mile (1.2 km), D-shaped, asphalt race track located just outside Richmond, Virginia, in Henrico County. It hosts the NASCAR Cup Series, the NASCAR Xfinity Series, NASCAR Camping World Truck Series and the IndyCar series. Known as "America's premier short track", it formerly hosted two USAC sprint car races. Chase Young, the 2020 NFL Defensive Rookie of the Year, was the honorary pace car driver.

==== Entry list ====
- (R) denotes rookie driver.
- (i) denotes driver who is ineligible for series driver points.

No.	Driver	Team	Manufacturer
1	Ross Chastain	Trackhouse Racing Team	Chevrolet
2	Austin Cindric (R)	Team Penske	Ford
3	Austin Dillon	Richard Childress Racing	Chevrolet
4	Kevin Harvick	Stewart-Haas Racing	Ford
5	Kyle Larson	Hendrick Motorsports	Chevrolet
6	Brad Keselowski	RFK Racing	Ford
7	Corey LaJoie	Spire Motorsports	Chevrolet
8	Tyler Reddick	Richard Childress Racing	Chevrolet
9	Chase Elliott	Hendrick Motorsports	Chevrolet
10	Aric Almirola	Stewart-Haas Racing	Ford
11	Denny Hamlin	Joe Gibbs Racing	Toyota
12	Ryan Blaney	Team Penske	Ford
14	Chase Briscoe	Stewart-Haas Racing	Ford
15	J. J. Yeley (i)	Rick Ware Racing	Ford
16	Noah Gragson (i)	Kaulig Racing	Chevrolet
17	Chris Buescher	RFK Racing	Ford
18	Kyle Busch	Joe Gibbs Racing	Toyota
19	Martin Truex Jr.	Joe Gibbs Racing	Toyota
20	Christopher Bell	Joe Gibbs Racing	Toyota
21	Harrison Burton (R)	Wood Brothers Racing	Ford
22	Joey Logano	Team Penske	Ford
23	Bubba Wallace	23XI Racing	Toyota
24	William Byron	Hendrick Motorsports	Chevrolet
31	Justin Haley	Kaulig Racing	Chevrolet
34	Michael McDowell	Front Row Motorsports	Ford
38	Todd Gilliland (R)	Front Row Motorsports	Ford
41	Cole Custer	Stewart-Haas Racing	Ford
42	Ty Dillon	Petty GMS Motorsports	Chevrolet
43	Erik Jones	Petty GMS Motorsports	Chevrolet
45	Ty Gibbs (i)	23XI Racing	Toyota
47	Ricky Stenhouse Jr.	JTG Daugherty Racing	Chevrolet
48	Alex Bowman	Hendrick Motorsports	Chevrolet
51	Cody Ware	Rick Ware Racing	Ford
77	Landon Cassill (i)	Spire Motorsports	Chevrolet
78	B. J. McLeod (i)	Live Fast Motorsports	Ford
99	Daniel Suárez	Trackhouse Racing Team	Chevrolet
Official entry list

== Practice ==
Ross Chastain was the fastest in the practice session with a time of 22.976 seconds and a speed of 117.514 mph (189.120 km/h).

=== Practice results ===
Pos	No.	Driver	Team	Manufacturer	Time	Speed
1	1	Ross Chastain	Trackhouse Racing Team	Chevrolet	22.976	117.514
2	8	Tyler Reddick	Richard Childress Racing	Chevrolet	23.064	117.066
3	2	Austin Cindric (R)	Team Penske	Ford	23.087	116.949
Official practice results

== Qualifying ==
Kyle Larson scored the pole for the race with a time of 23.042 and a speed of 117.177 mph (188.578 km/h).

=== Qualifying results ===
Pos	No.	Driver	Team	Manufacturer	R1	R2
1	5	Kyle Larson	Hendrick Motorsports	Chevrolet	22.863	23.042
2	1	Ross Chastain	Trackhouse Racing Team	Chevrolet	23.207	23.100
3	11	Denny Hamlin	Joe Gibbs Racing	Toyota	23.100	23.179
4	24	William Byron	Hendrick Motorsports	Chevrolet	22.933	23.182
5	48	Alex Bowman	Hendrick Motorsports	Chevrolet	22.916	23.199
6	19	Martin Truex Jr.	Joe Gibbs Racing	Toyota	23.155	23.235
7	41	Cole Custer	Stewart-Haas Racing	Ford	22.952	23.248
8	6	Brad Keselowski	RFK Racing	Ford	22.936	23.255
9	43	Erik Jones	Petty GMS Motorsports	Chevrolet	23.204	23.263
10	12	Ryan Blaney	Team Penske	Ford	22.916	23.319
11	23	Bubba Wallace	23XI Racing	Toyota	22.989	—
12	3	Austin Dillon	Richard Childress Racing	Chevrolet	23.086	—
13	4	Kevin Harvick	Stewart-Haas Racing	Ford	23.101	—
14	45	Ty Gibbs (i)	23XI Racing	Toyota	23.118	—
15	14	Chase Briscoe	Stewart-Haas Racing	Ford	23.138	—
16	38	Todd Gilliland (R)	Front Row Motorsports	Ford	23.159	—
17	22	Joey Logano	Team Penske	Ford	23.165	—
18	17	Chris Buescher	RFK Racing	Ford	23.172	—
19	16	Noah Gragson (i)	Kaulig Racing	Chevrolet	23.207	—
20	47	Ricky Stenhouse Jr.	JTG Daugherty Racing	Chevrolet	23.223	—
21	20	Christopher Bell	Joe Gibbs Racing	Toyota	23.265	—
22	42	Ty Dillon	Petty GMS Motorsports	Chevrolet	23.265	—
23	9	Chase Elliott	Hendrick Motorsports	Chevrolet	23.306	—
24	99	Daniel Suárez	Trackhouse Racing Team	Chevrolet	23.344	—
25	77	Landon Cassill (i)	Spire Motorsports	Chevrolet	23.364	—
26	8	Tyler Reddick	Richard Childress Racing	Chevrolet	23.505	—
27	31	Justin Haley	Kaulig Racing	Chevrolet	23.539	—
28	51	Cody Ware	Rick Ware Racing	Ford	23.555	—
29	18	Kyle Busch	Joe Gibbs Racing	Toyota	23.581	—
30	21	Harrison Burton (R)	Wood Brothers Racing	Ford	23.705	—
31	7	Corey LaJoie	Spire Motorsports	Chevrolet	23.710	—
32	10	Aric Almirola	Stewart-Haas Racing	Ford	23.767	—
33	2	Austin Cindric (R)	Team Penske	Ford	23.781	—
34	34	Michael McDowell	Front Row Motorsports	Ford	23.814	—
35	15	J. J. Yeley (i)	Rick Ware Racing	Ford	24.268	—
36	78	B. J. McLeod (i)	Live Fast Motorsports	Ford	0.000	—
Official qualifying results

== Race ==
=== Stage Results ===
Stage One Laps: 70

Pos	No	Driver	Team	Manufacturer	Points
1	1	Ross Chastain	Trackhouse Racing Team	Chevrolet	10
2	11	Denny Hamlin	Joe Gibbs Racing	Toyota	9
3	5	Kyle Larson	Hendrick Motorsports	Chevrolet	8
4	6	Brad Keselowski	RFK Racing	Ford	7
5	24	William Byron	Hendrick Motorsports	Chevrolet	6
6	12	Ryan Blaney	Team Penske	Ford	5
7	22	Joey Logano	Team Penske	Ford	4
8	48	Alex Bowman	Hendrick Motorsports	Chevrolet	3
9	41	Cole Custer	Stewart-Haas Racing	Ford	2
10	19	Martin Truex Jr.	Joe Gibbs Racing	Toyota	1
Official stage one results

Stage Two Laps: 160

Pos	No	Driver	Team	Manufacturer	Points
1	22	Joey Logano	Team Penske	Ford	10
2	5	Kyle Larson	Hendrick Motorsports	Chevrolet	9
3	11	Denny Hamlin	Joe Gibbs Racing	Toyota	8
4	4	Kevin Harvick	Stewart-Haas Racing	Ford	7
5	12	Ryan Blaney	Team Penske	Ford	6
6	10	Aric Almirola	Stewart-Haas Racing	Ford	5
7	17	Chris Buescher	RFK Racing	Ford	4
8	9	Chase Elliott	Hendrick Motorsports	Chevrolet	3
9	14	Chase Briscoe	Stewart-Haas Racing	Ford	2
10	18	Kyle Busch	Joe Gibbs Racing	Toyota	1
Official stage two results

=== Final Stage Results ===
Stage Three Laps: 170

Pos	Grid	No	Driver	Team	Manufacturer	Laps	Points
1	13	4	Kevin Harvick	Stewart-Haas Racing	Ford	400	47
2	21	20	Christopher Bell	Joe Gibbs Racing	Toyota	400	35
3	18	17	Chris Buescher	RFK Racing	Ford	400	38
4	3	11	Denny Hamlin	Joe Gibbs Racing	Toyota	400	50
5	23	9	Chase Elliott	Hendrick Motorsports	Chevrolet	400	35
6	17	22	Joey Logano	Team Penske	Ford	400	45
7	6	19	Martin Truex Jr.	Joe Gibbs Racing	Toyota	400	31
8	32	10	Aric Almirola	Stewart-Haas Racing	Ford	400	34
9	29	18	Kyle Busch	Joe Gibbs Racing	Toyota	400	29
10	10	12	Ryan Blaney	Team Penske	Ford	400	38
11	4	24	William Byron	Hendrick Motorsports	Chevrolet	400	32
12	33	2	Austin Cindric (R)	Team Penske	Ford	399	25
13	11	23	Bubba Wallace	23XI Racing	Toyota	399	24
14	1	5	Kyle Larson	Hendrick Motorsports	Chevrolet	399	40
15	8	6	Brad Keselowski	RFK Racing	Ford	399	29
16	12	3	Austin Dillon	Richard Childress Racing	Chevrolet	399	21
17	22	42	Ty Dillon	Petty GMS Motorsports	Chevrolet	398	20
18	2	1	Ross Chastain	Trackhouse Racing Team	Chevrolet	398	29
19	24	99	Daniel Suárez	Trackhouse Racing Team	Chevrolet	398	18
20	5	48	Alex Bowman	Hendrick Motorsports	Chevrolet	398	20
21	27	31	Justin Haley	Kaulig Racing	Chevrolet	398	16
22	20	47	Ricky Stenhouse Jr.	JTG Daugherty Racing	Chevrolet	398	15
23	15	14	Chase Briscoe	Stewart-Haas Racing	Ford	397	16
24	19	16	Noah Gragson (i)	Kaulig Racing	Chevrolet	397	0
25	30	21	Harrison Burton (R)	Wood Brothers Racing	Ford	397	12
26	7	41	Cole Custer	Stewart-Haas Racing	Ford	397	13
27	16	38	Todd Gilliland (R)	Front Row Motorsports	Ford	397	10
28	31	7	Corey LaJoie	Spire Motorsports	Chevrolet	397	9
29	34	34	Michael McDowell	Front Row Motorsports	Ford	395	8
30	25	77	Landon Cassill (i)	Spire Motorsports	Chevrolet	395	0
31	26	8	Tyler Reddick	Richard Childress Racing	Chevrolet	394	6
32	35	15	J. J. Yeley (i)	Rick Ware Racing	Ford	393	0
33	36	78	B. J. McLeod (i)	Live Fast Motorsports	Ford	392	0
34	28	51	Cody Ware	Rick Ware Racing	Ford	391	3
35	9	43	Erik Jones	Petty GMS Motorsports	Chevrolet	240	2
36	14	45	Ty Gibbs (i)	23XI Racing	Toyota	180	0
Official race results

=== Race statistics ===
- Lead changes: 16 among 9 different drivers
- Cautions/Laps: 5 for 28
- Red flags: 0
- Time of race: 3 hours, 3 minutes and 27 seconds
- Average speed: 98.11 miles per hour (157.89 km/h)

== Media ==
=== Television ===
USA covered the race on the television side. Rick Allen, Jeff Burton, Steve Letarte and three-time Richmond winner Dale Earnhardt Jr. called the race from the broadcast booth. Dave Burns, Parker Kligerman, and Marty Snider handled the pit road duties from pit lane.

USA
Booth announcers	Pit reporters
Lap-by-lap: Rick Allen; Color-commentator: Jeff Burton; Color-commentator: Steve Letarte; Color-commentator: Dale Earnhardt Jr.	Dave Burns; Parker Kligerman; Marty Snider

=== Radio ===
The Motor Racing Network had the radio call for the race, which was also simulcast on Sirius XM NASCAR Radio. Alex Hayden and Jeff Striegle called the race from the broadcast booth for MRN when the field races through the front straightaway. Dave Moody called the race from a platform when the field races down the backstraightaway. Winston Kelley, Glenn Jarrett and Kim Coon called the action for MRN from pit lane.

MRN Radio
Booth announcers	Turn announcers	Pit reporters
Lead announcer: Alex Hayden; Announcer: Jeff Striegle	Backstretch: Dave Moody	Winston Kelley; Glenn Jarrett; Kim Coon

== Standings after the race ==
Drivers' Championship standings

	Pos	Driver	Points
	1	Chase Elliott	882
	2	Ryan Blaney	766 (–116)
2	3	Kyle Larson	745 (–137)
	4	Martin Truex Jr.	740 (–142)
2	5	Ross Chastain	739 (–143)
	6	Joey Logano	718 (–164)
	7	Christopher Bell	703 (–179)
1	8	Kevin Harvick	665 (–217)
1	9	Kyle Busch	663 (–219)
	10	William Byron	649 (–233)
	11	Alex Bowman	592 (–290)
5	12	Denny Hamlin	574 (–308)
	13	Daniel Suárez	574 (–308)
2	14	Tyler Reddick	563 (–319)
1	15	Austin Cindric	556 (–326)
2	16	Aric Almirola	552 (–330)
Official driver's standings

Manufacturers' Championship standings

Pos	Manufacturer	Points
1	Chevrolet	879
2	Ford	818 (–61)
3	Toyota	800 (–79)

- Note: Only the first 16 positions are included for the driver standings.
- . – Driver has clinched a position in the NASCAR Cup Series playoffs.

Previous race: 2022 FireKeepers Casino 400	NASCAR Cup Series; 2022 season	Next race: 2022 Go Bowling at The Glen
