= 2013 5-hour Energy 200 (September) =

28th race of the 2013 NASCAR Nationwide Series

2013 5-hour Energy 200 Benefiting Living Beyond Breast Cancer
Race details
- Race 28 of 33 of the 2013 NASCAR Nationwide Series
- Date: September 28, 2013
- Official name: 28th Annual 5-hour Energy 200 Benefiting Living Beyond Breast Cancer
- Location: Dover, Delaware, Dover International Speedway
- Course: Permanent racing facility
- Course length: 1 miles (1.6 km)
- Distance: 200 laps, 200 mi (321.868 km)
- Scheduled distance: 200 laps, 200 mi (321.868 km)
- Average speed: 131.219 miles per hour (211.177 km/h)

Pole position
Driver	Joey Logano	Penske Racing
- Time: 23.200

Most laps led
Driver	Joey Logano	Penske Racing
- Laps: 106

Winner
No. 22	Joey Logano	Penske Racing

Television in the United States
- Network: ESPN
- Announcers: Allen Bestwick, Dale Jarrett, Andy Petree

Radio in the United States
- Radio: Motor Racing Network

The 2013 5-hour Energy 200 Benefiting Living Beyond Breast Cancer was the 28th stock car race of the 2013 NASCAR Nationwide Series and the 28th iteration of the event. The race was held on Saturday, September 28, 2013, in Dover, Delaware at Dover International Speedway, a 1 mile (1.6 km) permanent oval-shaped racetrack. The race took the scheduled 200 laps to complete. At race's end, Joey Logano, driving for Penske Racing, would dominate the race to win his 21st career NASCAR Nationwide Series win and his third and final win of the season. To fill out the podium, Kyle Larson of Turner Scott Motorsports and Kevin Harvick of Richard Childress Racing would finish second and third, respectively.

== Background ==
The layout of Dover International Speedway, the venue where the race was held.

Dover International Speedway is an oval race track in Dover, Delaware, United States that has held at least two NASCAR races since it opened in 1969. In addition to NASCAR, the track also hosted USAC and the NTT IndyCar Series. The track features one layout, a 1-mile (1.6 km) concrete oval, with 24° banking in the turns and 9° banking on the straights. The speedway is owned and operated by Dover Motorsports.

The track, nicknamed "The Monster Mile", was built in 1969 by Melvin Joseph of Melvin L. Joseph Construction Company, Inc., with an asphalt surface, but was replaced with concrete in 1995. Six years later in 2001, the track's capacity moved to 135,000 seats, making the track have the largest capacity of sports venue in the mid-Atlantic. In 2002, the name changed to Dover International Speedway from Dover Downs International Speedway after Dover Downs Gaming and Entertainment split, making Dover Motorsports. From 2007 to 2009, the speedway worked on an improvement project called "The Monster Makeover", which expanded facilities at the track and beautified the track. After the 2014 season, the track's capacity was reduced to 95,500 seats.

=== Entry list ===
- (R) denotes rookie driver.
- (i) denotes driver who is ineligible for series driver points.

#	Driver	Team	Make	Sponsor
00	Blake Koch	SR² Motorsports	Toyota	SupportMilitary.org, Heroes Behind the Camo
01	Mike Wallace	JD Motorsports	Chevrolet	Iron Source, Meding's Seafood
2	Brian Scott	Richard Childress Racing	Chevrolet	Shore Lodge
3	Austin Dillon	Richard Childress Racing	Chevrolet	AdvoCare
4	Landon Cassill	JD Motorsports	Chevrolet	JD Motorsports
5	Brad Sweet	JR Motorsports	Chevrolet	Great Clips
6	Trevor Bayne	Roush Fenway Racing	Ford	Pillow Pets
7	Regan Smith	JR Motorsports	Chevrolet	Delaware Office of Highway Safety
10	Jeff Green	TriStar Motorsports	Toyota	TriStar Motorsports
11	Elliott Sadler	Joe Gibbs Racing	Toyota	OneMain Financial
12	Sam Hornish Jr.	Penske Racing	Ford	Snap-on
14	Eric McClure	TriStar Motorsports	Toyota	Hefty Ultimate with Arm & Hammer
15	Chase Miller	Rick Ware Racing	Chevrolet	Qolix
19	Mike Bliss	TriStar Motorsports	Toyota	TriStar Motorsports
20	Brian Vickers	Joe Gibbs Racing	Toyota	Dollar General
22	Joey Logano (i)	Penske Racing	Ford	Hertz
23	Donnie Neuenberger	Rick Ware Racing	Ford	Xtreme Motorsports, Cancun Cantina
24	Ryan Ellis	SR² Motorsports	Toyota	SR² Motorsports
30	Nelson Piquet Jr. (R)	Turner Scott Motorsports	Chevrolet	Cold Stone Creamery
31	Justin Allgaier	Turner Scott Motorsports	Chevrolet	SEM Products
32	Kyle Larson (R)	Turner Scott Motorsports	Chevrolet	LiftMaster
33	Kevin Harvick (i)	Richard Childress Racing	Chevrolet	Steak-Eze
40	T. J. Bell	The Motorsports Group	Chevrolet	The Fire Store
42	Josh Wise	The Motorsports Group	Chevrolet	The Motorsports Group
43	Michael Annett	Richard Petty Motorsports	Ford	Pilot Travel Centers
44	Cole Whitt	TriStar Motorsports	Toyota	TriStar Motorsports
46	J. J. Yeley (i)	The Motorsports Group	Chevrolet	The Motorsports Group
50	Danny Efland	MAKE Motorsports	Chevrolet	Defiant Whiskey
51	Jeremy Clements	Jeremy Clements Racing	Chevrolet	Jeremy Clements Racing
52	Joey Gase	Jimmy Means Racing	Toyota	Jimmy Means Racing
54	Kyle Busch (i)	Joe Gibbs Racing	Toyota	Monster Energy
60	Travis Pastrana	Roush Fenway Racing	Ford	Roush Fenway Racing
70	Brad Teague	ML Motorsports	Toyota	SCAG Power Equipment
74	Carl Long	Mike Harmon Racing	Dodge	Mike Harmon Racing
77	Parker Kligerman	Kyle Busch Motorsports	Toyota	Bandit Chippers, Toyota
79	T. J. Duke	Go Green Racing	Ford	Bryson's Fuel, Duke Masonry
87	Joe Nemechek	NEMCO Motorsports	Toyota	Wood Pellet Grills
89	Morgan Shepherd	Shepherd Racing Ventures	Chevrolet	King's Tire, Racing with Jesus
99	Alex Bowman (R)	RAB Racing	Toyota	ToyotaCare
Official entry list

== Practice ==
The only two-hour and 10-minute practice session took place on Friday, September 27, at 12:40 PM EST. Regan Smith of JR Motorsports would set the fastest time in the session, with a lap of 23.363 and an average speed of 154.090 miles per hour (247.984 km/h).

Pos.	#	Driver	Team	Make	Time	Speed
1	7	Regan Smith	JR Motorsports	Chevrolet	23.363	154.090
2	2	Brian Scott	Richard Childress Racing	Chevrolet	23.403	153.826
3	22	Joey Logano (i)	Penske Racing	Ford	23.423	153.695
Full practice results

== Qualifying ==
Qualifying was held on Saturday, September 28, at 12:05 PM EST. Each driver would have two laps to set a fastest time; the fastest of the two would count as their official qualifying lap.

Joey Logano of Penske Racing would win the pole, setting a time of 23.200 and an average speed of 155.172 miles per hour (249.725 km/h).

No drivers would fail to qualify.

=== Full qualifying results ===
Pos.	#	Driver	Team	Make	Time	Speed
1	22	Joey Logano (i)	Penske Racing	Ford	23.200	155.172
2	12	Sam Hornish Jr.	Penske Racing	Ford	23.230	154.972
3	3	Austin Dillon	Richard Childress Racing	Chevrolet	23.287	154.593
4	99	Alex Bowman (R)	RAB Racing	Toyota	23.315	154.407
5	54	Kyle Busch (i)	Joe Gibbs Racing	Toyota	23.387	153.932
6	19	Mike Bliss	TriStar Motorsports	Toyota	23.389	153.919
7	5	Brad Sweet	JR Motorsports	Chevrolet	23.402	153.833
8	33	Kevin Harvick (i)	Richard Childress Racing	Chevrolet	23.417	153.734
9	77	Parker Kligerman	Kyle Busch Motorsports	Toyota	23.506	153.152
10	2	Brian Scott	Richard Childress Racing	Chevrolet	23.522	153.048
11	20	Brian Vickers	Joe Gibbs Racing	Toyota	23.530	152.996
12	11	Elliott Sadler	Joe Gibbs Racing	Toyota	23.559	152.808
13	7	Regan Smith	JR Motorsports	Chevrolet	23.611	152.471
14	31	Justin Allgaier	Turner Scott Motorsports	Chevrolet	23.621	152.407
15	43	Michael Annett	Richard Petty Motorsports	Ford	23.696	151.924
16	30	Nelson Piquet Jr. (R)	Turner Scott Motorsports	Chevrolet	23.712	151.822
17	32	Kyle Larson (R)	Turner Scott Motorsports	Chevrolet	23.730	151.707
18	6	Trevor Bayne	Roush Fenway Racing	Ford	23.743	151.624
19	44	Cole Whitt	TriStar Motorsports	Toyota	23.766	151.477
20	4	Landon Cassill	JD Motorsports	Chevrolet	23.875	150.785
21	60	Travis Pastrana	Roush Fenway Racing	Ford	23.936	150.401
22	01	Mike Wallace	JD Motorsports	Chevrolet	24.010	149.938
23	51	Jeremy Clements	Jeremy Clements Racing	Chevrolet	24.148	149.081
24	87	Joe Nemechek	NEMCO Motorsports	Toyota	24.197	148.779
25	00	Blake Koch	SR² Motorsports	Toyota	24.422	147.408
26	42	Josh Wise	The Motorsports Group	Chevrolet	24.457	147.197
27	40	T. J. Bell	The Motorsports Group	Chevrolet	24.526	146.783
28	10	Jeff Green	TriStar Motorsports	Toyota	24.573	146.502
29	74	Carl Long	Mike Harmon Racing	Dodge	24.579	146.466
30	24	Ryan Ellis	SR² Motorsports	Toyota	24.660	145.985
31	14	Eric McClure	TriStar Motorsports	Toyota	24.662	145.974
32	50	Danny Efland	MAKE Motorsports	Chevrolet	24.943	144.329
33	52	Joey Gase	Jimmy Means Racing	Chevrolet	25.098	143.438
34	89	Morgan Shepherd	Shepherd Racing Ventures	Chevrolet	25.284	142.383
35	46	J. J. Yeley (i)	The Motorsports Group	Chevrolet	25.427	141.582
36	23	Donnie Neuenberger	Rick Ware Racing	Ford	25.597	140.641
37	15	Chase Miller	Rick Ware Racing	Chevrolet	25.798	139.546
38	79	T. J. Duke	Go Green Racing	Ford	25.834	139.351
39	70	Brad Teague	ML Motorsports	Toyota	26.990	133.383
Official starting lineup

== Race results ==
Fin	St	#	Driver	Team	Make	Laps	Led	Status	Pts	Winnings
1	1	22	Joey Logano (i)	Penske Racing	Ford	200	106	running	0	$49,230
2	17	32	Kyle Larson (R)	Turner Scott Motorsports	Chevrolet	200	0	running	42	$41,322
3	8	33	Kevin Harvick (i)	Richard Childress Racing	Chevrolet	200	0	running	0	$24,265
4	11	20	Brian Vickers	Joe Gibbs Racing	Toyota	200	0	running	40	$27,696
5	12	11	Elliott Sadler	Joe Gibbs Racing	Toyota	199	0	running	39	$25,821
6	3	3	Austin Dillon	Richard Childress Racing	Chevrolet	199	0	running	38	$24,671
7	9	77	Parker Kligerman	Kyle Busch Motorsports	Toyota	199	0	running	37	$22,256
8	5	54	Kyle Busch (i)	Joe Gibbs Racing	Toyota	199	89	running	0	$18,110
9	18	6	Trevor Bayne	Roush Fenway Racing	Ford	199	0	running	35	$21,621
10	6	19	Mike Bliss	TriStar Motorsports	Toyota	199	2	running	35	$22,446
11	10	2	Brian Scott	Richard Childress Racing	Chevrolet	199	0	running	33	$20,971
12	14	31	Justin Allgaier	Turner Scott Motorsports	Chevrolet	199	0	running	32	$20,846
13	7	5	Brad Sweet	JR Motorsports	Chevrolet	198	0	running	31	$20,746
14	15	43	Michael Annett	Richard Petty Motorsports	Ford	198	0	running	30	$20,621
15	13	7	Regan Smith	JR Motorsports	Chevrolet	198	0	running	29	$21,521
16	19	44	Cole Whitt	TriStar Motorsports	Toyota	198	3	running	29	$20,471
17	2	12	Sam Hornish Jr.	Penske Racing	Ford	198	0	running	27	$20,596
18	4	99	Alex Bowman (R)	RAB Racing	Toyota	197	0	running	26	$20,346
19	20	4	Landon Cassill	JD Motorsports	Chevrolet	197	0	running	25	$20,296
20	23	51	Jeremy Clements	Jeremy Clements Racing	Chevrolet	197	0	running	24	$20,921
21	22	01	Mike Wallace	JD Motorsports	Chevrolet	196	0	running	23	$20,191
22	21	60	Travis Pastrana	Roush Fenway Racing	Ford	196	0	running	22	$20,091
23	24	87	Joe Nemechek	NEMCO Motorsports	Toyota	196	0	running	21	$20,016
24	16	30	Nelson Piquet Jr. (R)	Turner Scott Motorsports	Chevrolet	194	0	running	20	$19,966
25	38	79	T. J. Duke	Go Green Racing	Ford	191	0	running	19	$20,391
26	31	14	Eric McClure	TriStar Motorsports	Toyota	189	0	running	18	$19,866
27	34	89	Morgan Shepherd	Shepherd Racing Ventures	Chevrolet	177	0	running	17	$19,816
28	27	40	T. J. Bell	The Motorsports Group	Chevrolet	162	0	running	16	$19,741
29	33	52	Joey Gase	Jimmy Means Racing	Chevrolet	107	0	rear gear	15	$19,666
30	25	00	Blake Koch	SR² Motorsports	Toyota	85	0	handling	14	$19,916
31	29	74	Carl Long	Mike Harmon Racing	Dodge	74	0	transmission	13	$19,566
32	30	24	Ryan Ellis	SR² Motorsports	Toyota	60	0	brakes	12	$13,315
33	39	70	Brad Teague	ML Motorsports	Toyota	58	0	parked	11	$13,245
34	36	23	Donnie Neuenberger	Rick Ware Racing	Ford	33	0	crash	10	$19,406
35	28	10	Jeff Green	TriStar Motorsports	Toyota	13	0	vibration	9	$13,155
36	35	46	J. J. Yeley (i)	The Motorsports Group	Chevrolet	9	0	overheating	0	$12,260
37	37	15	Chase Miller	Rick Ware Racing	Chevrolet	8	0	handling	7	$12,240
38	26	42	Josh Wise	The Motorsports Group	Chevrolet	7	0	transmission	6	$12,176
39	32	50	Danny Efland	MAKE Motorsports	Chevrolet	4	0	vibration	5	$12,075
Official race results

== Standings after the race ==
Drivers' Championship standings

Pos	Driver	Points
1	Sam Hornish Jr.	989
2	Austin Dillon	985 (-4)
3	Elliott Sadler	947 (-42)
4	Regan Smith	946 (–43)
5	Brian Vickers	942 (–47)
6	Justin Allgaier	919 (–70)
7	Brian Scott	916 (–73)
8	Trevor Bayne	903 (–86)
9	Kyle Larson	864 (–125)
10	Parker Kligerman	820 (–169)
Official driver's standings

- Note: Only the first 10 positions are included for the driver standings.

Previous race: 2013 Kentucky 300	NASCAR Nationwide Series; 2013 season	Next race: 2013 Kansas Lottery 300
