= 2013 Kansas Lottery 300 =

29th race of the 2013 NASCAR Nationwide Series

Race details
- Race 29 of 33 of the 2013 NASCAR Nationwide Series
- Date: October 5, 2013
- Official name: 13th Annual Kansas Lottery 300
- Location: Kansas City, Kansas, Kansas Speedway
- Course: Permanent racing facility
- Course length: 1.5 miles (2.41 km)
- Distance: 200 laps, 300 mi (482.803 km)
- Scheduled distance: 200 laps, 300 mi (482.803 km)
- Average speed: 114.262 miles per hour (183.887 km/h)

Pole position
Driver	Austin Dillon	Richard Childress Racing
- Time: 29.281

Most laps led
Driver	Regan Smith	JR Motorsports
- Laps: 81

Winner
No. 18	Matt Kenseth	Joe Gibbs Racing

Television in the United States
- Network: ESPN2
- Announcers: Allen Bestwick, Dale Jarrett, Andy Petree

Radio in the United States
- Radio: Motor Racing Network

The 2013 Kansas Lottery 300 was the 29th stock car race of the 2013 NASCAR Nationwide Series and the 13th iteration of the event. The race was held on Saturday, October 5, 2013, in Kansas City, Kansas at Kansas Speedway, a 1,500 mile (2.414 km) permanent paved oval-shaped racetrack. The race took the scheduled 200 laps to complete. At race's end, Matt Kenseth, driving for Joe Gibbs Racing, would hold on to the lead by fuel strategy to win his 28th career NASCAR Nationwide Series win and his second and final win of the season. To fill out the podium, Paul Menard of Richard Childress Racing and Regan Smith of JR Motorsports would finish second and third, respectively.

== Background ==
The layout of Kansas Speedway, the venue where the race was held.

Kansas Speedway is a 1.5-mile (2.4 km) tri-oval race track in Kansas City, Kansas. It was built in 2001 and hosts two annual NASCAR race weekends. The NTT IndyCar Series also raced there until 2011. The speedway is owned and operated by the International Speedway Corporation.

=== Entry list ===
- (R) denotes rookie driver.
- (i) denotes driver who is ineligible for series driver points.

#	Driver	Team	Make	Sponsor
00	Blake Koch	SR² Motorsports	Toyota	SupportMilitary.org, Heroes Behind the Camo
01	Mike Wallace	JD Motorsports	Chevrolet	JD Motorsports
2	Brian Scott	Richard Childress Racing	Chevrolet	Fast Fixin'
3	Austin Dillon	Richard Childress Racing	Chevrolet	AdvoCare Spark
4	Landon Cassill	JD Motorsports	Chevrolet	All Day Parts
5	Brad Sweet	JR Motorsports	Chevrolet	Great Clips
6	Trevor Bayne	Roush Fenway Racing	Ford	Sam's Club Angus Beef
7	Regan Smith	JR Motorsports	Chevrolet	Fire Alarm Services
10	Jeff Green	TriStar Motorsports	Toyota	TriStar Motorsports
11	Elliott Sadler	Joe Gibbs Racing	Toyota	Sport Clips Haircuts
12	Sam Hornish Jr.	Penske Racing	Ford	Alliance Truck Parts
14	Eric McClure	TriStar Motorsports	Toyota	Hefty Ultimate with Arm & Hammer
15	Chase Miller	Rick Ware Racing	Chevrolet	Qolix
16	Chris Buescher	Roush Fenway Racing	Ford	Roush Fenway Racing Driven
18	Matt Kenseth (i)	Joe Gibbs Racing	Toyota	Reser's Fine Foods
19	Mike Bliss	TriStar Motorsports	Toyota	TriStar Motorsports
20	Brian Vickers	Joe Gibbs Racing	Toyota	Dollar General
21	Dakoda Armstrong (i)	Richard Childress Racing	Chevrolet	WinField United
22	Brad Keselowski (i)	Penske Racing	Ford	Discount Tire
23	Jennifer Jo Cobb (i)	Rick Ware Racing	Ford	Driven 2 Honor, Mark One Electric
24	Ken Butler III	SR² Motorsports	Toyota	5 Star Lodge and Stables
30	Nelson Piquet Jr. (R)	Turner Scott Motorsports	Chevrolet	Worx Yard Tools
31	Justin Allgaier	Turner Scott Motorsports	Chevrolet	Brandt Professional Agriculture
32	Kyle Larson (R)	Turner Scott Motorsports	Chevrolet	Cessna
33	Paul Menard (i)	Richard Childress Racing	Chevrolet	Menards, Rheem
34	James Buescher (i)	Turner Scott Motorsports	Chevrolet	Fraternal Order of Eagles
39	Ryan Sieg (i)	RSS Racing	Chevrolet	Pull-A-Part
40	T. J. Bell	The Motorsports Group	Chevrolet	The Motorsports Group
42	Josh Wise	The Motorsports Group	Chevrolet	The Motorsports Group
43	Michael Annett	Richard Petty Motorsports	Ford	Pilot Flying J
44	Hal Martin (R)	TriStar Motorsports	Toyota	Oracle Lighting
46	J. J. Yeley (i)	The Motorsports Group	Chevrolet	The Motorsports Group
50	Danny Efland*	MAKE Motorsports	Chevrolet	Defiant Whiskey
51	Jeremy Clements	Jeremy Clements Racing	Chevrolet	RepairableVehicles.com
52	Joey Gase	Jimmy Means Racing	Toyota	Donate Life
54	Kyle Busch (i)	Joe Gibbs Racing	Toyota	Monster Energy
60	Travis Pastrana	Roush Fenway Racing	Ford	Roush Fenway Racing
70	Johanna Long	ML Motorsports	Chevrolet	Foretravel Motorcoach
74	Carl Long	Mike Harmon Racing	Dodge	Mike Harmon Racing
77	Parker Kligerman	Kyle Busch Motorsports	Toyota	Kyle Busch Foundation
79	Bryan Silas (R) (i)	Go Green Racing	Ford	Bell Trucks America
87	Joe Nemechek	NEMCO Motorsports	Toyota	Wood Pellet Grills
99	Alex Bowman (R)	RAB Racing	Toyota	St. Jude Children's Research Hospital
Official entry list

== Practice ==
=== First practice ===
The first practice session was held on Friday, October 4, at 1:10 PM CST, and would last for one hour and five minutes. Alex Bowman of RAB Racing would set the fastest time in the session, with a lap of 30.470 and an average speed of 177.223 miles per hour (285.213 km/h).

Pos.	#	Driver	Team	Make	Time	Speed
1	99	Alex Bowman (R)	RAB Racing	Toyota	30.470	177.223
2	7	Regan Smith	JR Motorsports	Chevrolet	30.586	176.551
3	16	Chris Buescher	Roush Fenway Racing	Ford	30.607	176.430
Full first practice results

=== Second and final practice ===
The second and final practice session, sometimes referred to as Happy Hour, was held on Friday, October 4, at 2:40 PM CST, and would last for one hour and 20 minutes. Regan Smith of JR Motorsports would set the fastest time in the session, with a lap of 30.064 and an average speed of 179.617 miles per hour (289.066 km/h).

Pos.	#	Driver	Team	Make	Time	Speed
1	7	Regan Smith	JR Motorsports	Chevrolet	30.064	179.617
2	18	Matt Kenseth (i)	Joe Gibbs Racing	Toyota	30.143	179.146
3	77	Parker Kligerman	Kyle Busch Motorsports	Toyota	30.188	178.879
Full Happy Hour practice results

== Qualifying ==
Qualifying was held on Saturday, October 5, at 11:05 AM CST. Each driver would have two laps to set a fastest time; the fastest of the two would count as their official qualifying lap.

Austin Dillon of Richard Childress Racing would win the pole, setting a time of 29.281 and an average speed of 184.420 miles per hour (296.795 km/h).

Two drivers would fail to qualify: Chase Miller and Joey Gase.

=== Full qualifying results ===
Pos.	#	Driver	Team	Make	Time	Speed
1	3	Austin Dillon	Richard Childress Racing	Chevrolet	29.281	184.420
2	31	Justin Allgaier	Turner Scott Motorsports	Chevrolet	29.338	184.062
3	11	Elliott Sadler	Joe Gibbs Racing	Toyota	29.423	183.530
4	33	Paul Menard (i)	Richard Childress Racing	Chevrolet	29.451	183.355
5	7	Regan Smith	JR Motorsports	Chevrolet	29.454	183.337
6	2	Brian Scott	Richard Childress Racing	Chevrolet	29.463	183.281
7	77	Parker Kligerman	Kyle Busch Motorsports	Toyota	29.475	183.206
8	6	Trevor Bayne	Roush Fenway Racing	Ford	29.495	183.082
9	5	Brad Sweet	JR Motorsports	Chevrolet	29.502	183.038
10	16	Chris Buescher	Roush Fenway Racing	Ford	29.510	182.989
11	99	Alex Bowman (R)	RAB Racing	Toyota	29.512	182.976
12	54	Kyle Busch (i)	Joe Gibbs Racing	Toyota	29.525	182.896
13	22	Brad Keselowski (i)	Penske Racing	Ford	29.527	182.883
14	30	Nelson Piquet Jr. (R)	Turner Scott Motorsports	Chevrolet	29.542	182.791
15	12	Sam Hornish Jr.	Penske Racing	Ford	29.563	182.661
16	20	Brian Vickers	Joe Gibbs Racing	Toyota	29.572	182.605
17	18	Matt Kenseth (i)	Joe Gibbs Racing	Toyota	29.604	182.408
18	43	Michael Annett	Richard Petty Motorsports	Ford	29.762	181.439
19	32	Kyle Larson (R)	Turner Scott Motorsports	Chevrolet	29.831	181.020
20	60	Travis Pastrana	Roush Fenway Racing	Ford	29.833	181.008
21	19	Mike Bliss	TriStar Motorsports	Toyota	29.910	180.542
22	39	Ryan Sieg (i)	RSS Racing	Chevrolet	29.927	180.439
23	70	Johanna Long	ML Motorsports	Chevrolet	29.941	180.355
24	51	Jeremy Clements	Jeremy Clements Racing	Chevrolet	30.092	179.450
25	34	James Buescher (i)	Turner Scott Motorsports	Chevrolet	30.315	178.130
26	10	Jeff Green	TriStar Motorsports	Toyota	30.316	178.124
27	44	Hal Martin (R)	TriStar Motorsports	Toyota	30.352	177.912
28	79	Bryan Silas (R) (i)	Go Green Racing	Ford	30.370	177.807
29	00	Blake Koch	SR² Motorsports	Toyota	30.375	177.778
30	21	Dakoda Armstrong (i)	Richard Childress Racing	Chevrolet	30.409	177.579
31	46	J. J. Yeley (i)	The Motorsports Group	Chevrolet	30.426	177.480
32	01	Mike Wallace	JD Motorsports	Chevrolet	30.455	177.311
33	40	T. J. Bell	The Motorsports Group	Chevrolet	30.500	177.049
34	4	Landon Cassill	JD Motorsports	Chevrolet	30.521	176.927
35	42	Josh Wise	The Motorsports Group	Chevrolet	30.570	176.644
36	87	Joe Nemechek	NEMCO Motorsports	Toyota	30.662	176.114
Qualified by owner's points
37	24	Ken Butler III	SR² Motorsports	Toyota	30.954	174.452
38	14	Eric McClure	TriStar Motorsports	Toyota	30.968	174.374
39	23	Jennifer Jo Cobb (i)	Rick Ware Racing	Ford	31.648	170.627
Last car to qualify on time
40	74	Carl Long	Mike Harmon Racing	Dodge	30.757	175.570
Failed to qualify or withdrew
41	15	Chase Miller	Rick Ware Racing	Chevrolet	30.804	175.302
42	52	Joey Gase	Jimmy Means Racing	Chevrolet	30.856	175.006
WD	50	Danny Efland	MAKE Motorsports	Chevrolet	—	—
Official starting lineup

== Race results ==
Fin	St	#	Driver	Team	Make	Laps	Led	Status	Pts	Winnings
1	17	18	Matt Kenseth (i)	Joe Gibbs Racing	Toyota	200	38	running	0	$73,450
2	4	33	Paul Menard (i)	Richard Childress Racing	Chevrolet	200	1	running	0	$57,800
3	5	7	Regan Smith	JR Motorsports	Chevrolet	200	81	running	43	$57,775
4	12	54	Kyle Busch (i)	Joe Gibbs Racing	Toyota	200	0	running	0	$32,975
5	2	31	Justin Allgaier	Turner Scott Motorsports	Chevrolet	200	14	running	40	$38,925
6	1	3	Austin Dillon	Richard Childress Racing	Chevrolet	200	36	running	39	$38,075
7	7	77	Parker Kligerman	Kyle Busch Motorsports	Toyota	200	7	running	38	$30,325
8	9	5	Brad Sweet	JR Motorsports	Chevrolet	200	0	running	36	$29,225
9	8	6	Trevor Bayne	Roush Fenway Racing	Ford	200	5	running	36	$28,135
10	3	11	Elliott Sadler	Joe Gibbs Racing	Toyota	200	0	running	34	$30,300
11	11	99	Alex Bowman (R)	RAB Racing	Toyota	200	0	running	33	$27,950
12	18	43	Michael Annett	Richard Petty Motorsports	Ford	200	0	running	32	$26,200
13	21	19	Mike Bliss	TriStar Motorsports	Toyota	200	0	running	31	$25,650
14	20	60	Travis Pastrana	Roush Fenway Racing	Ford	200	0	running	30	$25,140
15	25	34	James Buescher (i)	Turner Scott Motorsports	Chevrolet	200	0	running	0	$19,580
16	10	16	Chris Buescher	Roush Fenway Racing	Ford	200	2	running	29	$24,670
17	15	12	Sam Hornish Jr.	Penske Racing	Ford	200	0	running	27	$24,185
18	6	2	Brian Scott	Richard Childress Racing	Chevrolet	200	0	running	26	$23,925
19	30	21	Dakoda Armstrong (i)	Richard Childress Racing	Chevrolet	200	0	running	0	$23,715
20	14	30	Nelson Piquet Jr. (R)	Turner Scott Motorsports	Chevrolet	200	0	running	24	$24,180
21	22	39	Ryan Sieg (i)	RSS Racing	Chevrolet	200	0	running	0	$17,395
22	34	4	Landon Cassill	JD Motorsports	Chevrolet	199	0	running	22	$23,285
23	28	79	Bryan Silas (R) (i)	Go Green Racing	Ford	199	0	running	0	$23,150
24	23	70	Johanna Long	ML Motorsports	Chevrolet	199	0	running	20	$23,040
25	36	87	Joe Nemechek	NEMCO Motorsports	Toyota	196	0	running	19	$23,380
26	39	23	Jennifer Jo Cobb (i)	Rick Ware Racing	Ford	195	0	running	0	$22,795
27	38	14	Eric McClure	TriStar Motorsports	Toyota	191	0	running	17	$22,685
28	13	22	Brad Keselowski (i)	Penske Racing	Ford	187	15	crash	0	$16,565
29	16	20	Brian Vickers	Joe Gibbs Racing	Toyota	179	0	running	15	$22,415
30	19	32	Kyle Larson (R)	Turner Scott Motorsports	Chevrolet	145	0	handling	14	$22,605
31	32	01	Mike Wallace	JD Motorsports	Chevrolet	137	1	running	14	$22,150
32	37	24	Ken Butler III	SR² Motorsports	Toyota	131	0	crash	12	$22,040
33	33	40	T. J. Bell	The Motorsports Group	Chevrolet	120	0	crash	11	$21,925
34	40	74	Carl Long	Mike Harmon Racing	Dodge	102	0	vibration	10	$21,814
35	27	44	Hal Martin (R)	TriStar Motorsports	Toyota	80	0	crash	9	$21,689
36	24	51	Jeremy Clements	Jeremy Clements Racing	Chevrolet	77	0	engine	8	$20,445
37	29	00	Blake Koch	SR² Motorsports	Toyota	28	0	overheating	7	$14,325
38	31	46	J. J. Yeley (i)	The Motorsports Group	Chevrolet	11	0	vibration	0	$14,265
39	35	42	Josh Wise	The Motorsports Group	Chevrolet	8	0	rear gear	5	$13,940
40	26	10	Jeff Green	TriStar Motorsports	Toyota	4	0	vibration	4	$13,830
Failed to qualify or withdrew
41		15	Chase Miller	Rick Ware Racing	Chevrolet					
42		52	Joey Gase	Jimmy Means Racing	Chevrolet					
WD		50	Danny Efland	MAKE Motorsports	Chevrolet					
Official race results

== Standings after the race ==
Drivers' Championship standings

Pos	Driver	Points
1	Austin Dillon	1,024
2	Sam Hornish Jr.	1,016 (-8)
3	Regan Smith	989 (-35)
4	Elliott Sadler	981 (–43)
5	Justin Allgaier	959 (–65)
6	Brian Vickers	957 (–67)
7	Brian Scott	942 (–82)
8	Trevor Bayne	939 (–85)
9	Kyle Larson	878 (–146)
10	Parker Kligerman	858 (–166)
Official driver's standings

- Note: Only the first 10 positions are included for the driver standings.

Previous race: 2013 5-hour Energy 200 (September)	NASCAR Nationwide Series; 2013 season	Next race: 2013 Dollar General 300 (Charlotte)
