= 2013 Kentucky 300 =

27th race of the 2013 NASCAR Nationwide Series

Race details
- Race 27 of 33 of the 2013 NASCAR Nationwide Series
- Date: September 21, 2013
- Official name: 2nd Annual Kentucky 300
- Location: Sparta, Kentucky, Kentucky Speedway
- Course: Permanent racing facility
- Course length: 1.5 miles (2.41 km)
- Distance: 200 laps, 300 mi (482.803 km)
- Scheduled distance: 200 laps, 300 mi (482.803 km)
- Average speed: 121.131 miles per hour (194.941 km/h)

Pole position
Driver	Sam Hornish Jr.	Penske Racing
- Time: 30.128

Most laps led
Driver	Ryan Blaney	Penske Racing
- Laps: 95

Winner
No. 22	Ryan Blaney	Penske Racing

Television in the United States
- Network: ESPNEWS
- Announcers: Marty Reid, Ricky Craven

Radio in the United States
- Radio: Performance Racing Network

The 2013 Kentucky 300 was the 27th stock car race of the 2013 NASCAR Nationwide Series and the second iteration of the event. The race was held on Saturday, September 21, 2013, in Sparta, Kentucky, at Kentucky Speedway, a 1.5-mile (2.41 km) tri-oval speedway. The race took the scheduled 200 laps to complete. At race's end, Ryan Blaney, driving for Penske Racing, would be able to hold off the field on the final restart to win his first career NASCAR Nationwide Series win and his only win of the season. To fill out the podium, Austin Dillon and Matt Crafton, both driving for Richard Childress Racing, would finish second and third, respectively.

== Background ==
The layout of Kentucky Speedway. the venue where the race was held.

Kentucky Speedway is a 1.5-mile (2.4 km) tri-oval speedway in Sparta, Kentucky, which has hosted ARCA, NASCAR and Indy Racing League racing annually since it opened in 2000. The track is currently owned and operated by Speedway Motorsports, Inc. and Jerry Carroll, who, along with four other investors, owned Kentucky Speedway until 2008. The speedway has a grandstand capacity of 117,000. Construction of the speedway began in 1998 and was completed in mid-2000. The speedway has hosted the Gander RV & Outdoors Truck Series, Xfinity Series, IndyCar Series, Indy Lights, and most recently, the NASCAR Cup Series beginning in 2011.

=== Entry list ===
- (R) denotes rookie driver.
- (i) denotes driver who is ineligible for series driver points.

#	Driver	Team	Make	Sponsor
00	Blake Koch	SR² Motorsports	Toyota	SupportMilitary.org, Kappa Sigma
01	Mike Wallace	JD Motorsports	Chevrolet	Disaster Services of Environmental Specialists
2	Brian Scott	Richard Childress Racing	Chevrolet	Shore Lodge
3	Austin Dillon	Richard Childress Racing	Chevrolet	AdvoCare
4	Landon Cassill	JD Motorsports	Chevrolet	JD Motorsports
5	Brad Sweet	JR Motorsports	Chevrolet	Great Clips
6	Trevor Bayne	Roush Fenway Racing	Ford	Ford EcoBoost
7	Regan Smith	JR Motorsports	Chevrolet	TaxSlayer
10	Jeff Green	TriStar Motorsports	Toyota	TriStar Motorsports
11	Elliott Sadler	Joe Gibbs Racing	Toyota	Sport Clips Haircuts
12	Sam Hornish Jr.	Penske Racing	Ford	Alliance Truck Parts
14	Eric McClure	TriStar Motorsports	Toyota	Hefty Ultimate with Arm & Hammer
18	Joey Coulter (i)	Joe Gibbs Racing	Toyota	Freightliner
19	Mike Bliss	TriStar Motorsports	Toyota	TriStar Motorsports
20	Brian Vickers	Joe Gibbs Racing	Toyota	Dollar General
21	Dakoda Armstrong (i)	Richard Childress Racing	Chevrolet	WinField United
22	Ryan Blaney (i)	Penske Racing	Ford	Discount Tire
23	Harrison Rhodes	Rick Ware Racing	Ford	Precision Fabrication, Craven Sign Service
24	Ryan Ellis	SR² Motorsports	Toyota	SR² Motorsports
30	Nelson Piquet Jr. (R)	Turner Scott Motorsports	Chevrolet	Worx Yard Tools
31	Justin Allgaier	Turner Scott Motorsports	Chevrolet	Brandt Professional Agriculture
32	Kyle Larson (R)	Turner Scott Motorsports	Chevrolet	Clear Men Scalp Therapy
33	Matt Crafton (i)	Richard Childress Racing	Chevrolet	Menards, Rheem
34	Jeb Burton (i)	Turner Scott Motorsports	Chevrolet	Arrowhead Brass
40	Reed Sorenson	The Motorsports Group	Chevrolet	The Motorsports Group
42	T. J. Bell	The Motorsports Group	Chevrolet	The Motorsports Group
43	Michael Annett	Richard Petty Motorsports	Ford	Pilot Flying J
44	Cole Whitt	TriStar Motorsports	Toyota	TriStar Motorsports
46	Matt DiBenedetto	The Motorsports Group	Chevrolet	The Motorsports Group
50	Danny Efland	MAKE Motorsports	Chevrolet	Defiant Whiskey
51	Jeremy Clements	Jeremy Clements Racing	Chevrolet	Value Lighting, All South Electric
52	Joey Gase	Jimmy Means Racing	Toyota	Donate Life
54	Drew Herring	Joe Gibbs Racing	Toyota	Monster Energy
55	Jamie Dick	Viva Motorsports	Chevrolet	Viva Motorsports
60	Travis Pastrana	Roush Fenway Racing	Ford	Roush Fenway Racing
70	Johanna Long	ML Motorsports	Chevrolet	ForeTravel Motorcoach
74	Carl Long	Mike Harmon Racing	Dodge	Mike Harmon Racing
77	Parker Kligerman	Kyle Busch Motorsports	Toyota	Toyota, Camp Horsin' Around
79	Jeffrey Earnhardt (R)	Go Green Racing	Ford	Keen Parts
87	Joe Nemechek	NEMCO Motorsports	Toyota	Lester Buildings
99	Alex Bowman (R)	RAB Racing	Toyota	ToyotaCare
Official entry list

== Practice ==
Originally, two practice sessions were scheduled to be held on Friday, September 20, but the final session would get canceled due to rain.

The only one-hour and 30-minute practice session was held on Friday, September 20, at 3:30 PM EST. Matt Crafton of Richard Childress Racing would set the fastest time in the session, with a lap of 31.081 and an average speed of 173.740 miles per hour (279.607 km/h).

Pos.	#	Driver	Team	Make	Time	Speed
1	33	Matt Crafton (i)	Richard Childress Racing	Chevrolet	31.081	173.740
2	3	Austin Dillon	Richard Childress Racing	Chevrolet	31.140	173.410
3	2	Brian Scott	Richard Childress Racing	Chevrolet	31.200	173.077
Full practice results

== Qualifying ==
Qualifying was held on Saturday, September 21, at 4:35 PM EST. Each driver would have two laps to set a fastest time; the fastest of the two would count as their official qualifying lap.

Sam Hornish Jr. of Penske Racing would win the pole, setting a time of 30.128 and an average speed of 179.235 miles per hour (288.451 km/h).

Danny Efland would be the only driver to fail to qualify.

=== Full qualifying results ===
Pos.	#	Driver	Team	Make	Time	Speed
1	12	Sam Hornish Jr.	Penske Racing	Ford	30.128	179.235
2	22	Ryan Blaney (i)	Penske Racing	Ford	30.310	178.159
3	3	Austin Dillon	Richard Childress Racing	Chevrolet	30.330	178.042
4	2	Brian Scott	Richard Childress Racing	Chevrolet	30.388	177.702
5	33	Matt Crafton (i)	Richard Childress Racing	Chevrolet	30.447	177.357
6	18	Joey Coulter (i)	Joe Gibbs Racing	Toyota	30.595	176.499
7	54	Drew Herring	Joe Gibbs Racing	Toyota	30.598	176.482
8	60	Travis Pastrana	Roush Fenway Racing	Ford	30.612	176.401
9	31	Justin Allgaier	Turner Scott Motorsports	Chevrolet	30.616	176.378
10	20	Brian Vickers	Joe Gibbs Racing	Toyota	30.623	176.338
11	77	Parker Kligerman	Kyle Busch Motorsports	Toyota	30.637	176.257
12	11	Elliott Sadler	Joe Gibbs Racing	Toyota	30.677	176.028
13	34	Jeb Burton (i)	Turner Scott Motorsports	Chevrolet	30.718	175.793
14	7	Regan Smith	JR Motorsports	Chevrolet	30.741	175.661
15	43	Michael Annett	Richard Petty Motorsports	Ford	30.762	175.541
16	30	Nelson Piquet Jr. (R)	Turner Scott Motorsports	Chevrolet	30.765	175.524
17	5	Brad Sweet	JR Motorsports	Chevrolet	30.791	175.376
18	44	Cole Whitt	TriStar Motorsports	Toyota	30.805	175.296
19	32	Kyle Larson (R)	Turner Scott Motorsports	Chevrolet	30.814	175.245
20	99	Alex Bowman (R)	RAB Racing	Toyota	30.850	175.041
21	21	Dakoda Armstrong (i)	Richard Childress Racing	Chevrolet	30.915	174.672
22	6	Trevor Bayne	Roush Fenway Racing	Ford	31.014	174.115
23	19	Mike Bliss	TriStar Motorsports	Toyota	31.142	173.399
24	51	Jeremy Clements	Jeremy Clements Racing	Chevrolet	31.278	172.645
25	14	Eric McClure	TriStar Motorsports	Toyota	31.326	172.381
26	79	Jeffrey Earnhardt (R)	Go Green Racing	Ford	31.504	171.407
27	10	Jeff Green	TriStar Motorsports	Toyota	31.519	171.325
28	4	Kevin Lepage	JD Motorsports	Chevrolet	31.599	170.891
29	40	Reed Sorenson	The Motorsports Group	Chevrolet	31.611	170.827
30	74	Carl Long	Mike Harmon Racing	Dodge	31.717	170.256
31	01	Mike Wallace	JD Motorsports	Chevrolet	31.765	169.998
32	55	Jamie Dick	Viva Motorsports	Chevrolet	31.835	169.625
33	00	Blake Koch	SR² Motorsports	Toyota	31.845	169.571
34	87	Joe Nemechek	NEMCO Motorsports	Toyota	31.887	169.348
35	52	Joey Gase	Jimmy Means Racing	Chevrolet	31.909	169.231
36	70	Johanna Long	ML Motorsports	Chevrolet	31.925	169.146
37	42	T. J. Bell	The Motorsports Group	Chevrolet	32.085	168.303
38	24	Ryan Ellis	SR² Motorsports	Toyota	32.637	165.456
Qualified by owner's points
39	23	Harrison Rhodes	Rick Ware Racing	Ford	32.927	163.999
Last car to qualify on time
40	46	Matt DiBenedetto	The Motorsports Group	Chevrolet	32.139	168.020
Failed to qualify
41	50	Danny Efland	MAKE Motorsports	Chevrolet	32.738	164.946
Official starting lineup

== Race results ==
Fin	St	#	Driver	Team	Make	Laps	Led	Status	Pts	Winnings
1	2	22	Ryan Blaney (i)	Penske Racing	Ford	200	96	running	0	$80,800
2	3	3	Austin Dillon	Richard Childress Racing	Chevrolet	200	32	running	43	$57,475
3	5	33	Matt Crafton (i)	Richard Childress Racing	Chevrolet	200	0	running	0	$38,995
4	1	12	Sam Hornish Jr.	Penske Racing	Ford	200	65	running	41	$31,290
5	20	99	Alex Bowman (R)	RAB Racing	Toyota	200	0	running	39	$27,590
6	7	54	Drew Herring	Joe Gibbs Racing	Toyota	200	0	running	38	$24,915
7	10	20	Brian Vickers	Joe Gibbs Racing	Toyota	200	0	running	37	$23,265
8	13	34	Jeb Burton (i)	Turner Scott Motorsports	Chevrolet	200	0	running	0	$15,265
9	18	44	Cole Whitt	TriStar Motorsports	Toyota	200	0	running	35	$21,040
10	15	43	Michael Annett	Richard Petty Motorsports	Ford	200	0	running	34	$21,790
11	4	2	Brian Scott	Richard Childress Racing	Chevrolet	200	1	running	34	$22,170
12	14	7	Regan Smith	JR Motorsports	Chevrolet	200	0	running	32	$19,745
13	21	21	Dakoda Armstrong (i)	Richard Childress Racing	Chevrolet	200	0	running	0	$13,295
14	12	11	Elliott Sadler	Joe Gibbs Racing	Toyota	200	4	running	31	$19,840
15	22	6	Trevor Bayne	Roush Fenway Racing	Ford	200	0	running	29	$19,830
16	36	70	Johanna Long	ML Motorsports	Chevrolet	200	0	running	28	$18,520
17	9	31	Justin Allgaier	Turner Scott Motorsports	Chevrolet	200	0	running	27	$18,415
18	6	18	Joey Coulter (i)	Joe Gibbs Racing	Toyota	200	0	running	0	$18,285
19	28	4	Kevin Lepage	JD Motorsports	Chevrolet	199	0	running	25	$18,172
20	24	51	Jeremy Clements	Jeremy Clements Racing	Chevrolet	198	2	running	25	$18,725
21	29	40	Reed Sorenson	The Motorsports Group	Chevrolet	198	0	running	23	$17,945
22	31	01	Mike Wallace	JD Motorsports	Chevrolet	198	0	running	22	$17,840
23	34	87	Joe Nemechek	NEMCO Motorsports	Toyota	197	0	running	21	$17,715
24	25	14	Eric McClure	TriStar Motorsports	Toyota	197	0	running	20	$17,585
25	26	79	Jeffrey Earnhardt (R)	Go Green Racing	Ford	197	0	running	19	$17,955
26	23	19	Mike Bliss	TriStar Motorsports	Toyota	196	0	running	18	$17,375
27	16	30	Nelson Piquet Jr. (R)	Turner Scott Motorsports	Chevrolet	194	0	running	17	$17,270
28	32	55	Jamie Dick	Viva Motorsports	Chevrolet	194	0	running	16	$11,165
29	11	77	Parker Kligerman	Kyle Busch Motorsports	Toyota	187	0	crash	15	$17,040
30	17	5	Brad Sweet	JR Motorsports	Chevrolet	161	0	crash	14	$17,235
31	35	52	Joey Gase	Jimmy Means Racing	Chevrolet	113	0	suspension	13	$10,830
32	39	23	Harrison Rhodes	Rick Ware Racing	Ford	100	0	engine	12	$16,725
33	19	32	Kyle Larson (R)	Turner Scott Motorsports	Chevrolet	98	0	brakes	11	$10,635
34	8	60	Travis Pastrana	Roush Fenway Racing	Ford	59	0	crash	10	$16,545
35	38	24	Ryan Ellis	SR² Motorsports	Toyota	31	0	vibration	9	$16,450
36	40	46	Matt DiBenedetto	The Motorsports Group	Chevrolet	8	0	overheating	8	$9,895
37	30	74	Carl Long	Mike Harmon Racing	Dodge	8	0	suspension	7	$9,865
38	37	42	T. J. Bell	The Motorsports Group	Chevrolet	6	0	transmission	6	$9,836
39	33	00	Blake Koch	SR² Motorsports	Toyota	4	0	rear gear	5	$9,705
40	27	10	Jeff Green	TriStar Motorsports	Toyota	3	0	vibration	4	$9,610
Failed to qualify
41		50	Danny Efland	MAKE Motorsports	Chevrolet					
Official race results

== Standings after the race ==
Drivers' Championship standings

Pos	Driver	Points
1	Sam Hornish Jr.	962
2	Austin Dillon	947 (-15)
3	Regan Smith	917 (-45)
4	Elliott Sadler	908 (–54)
5	Brian Vickers	902 (–60)
6	Justin Allgaier	887 (–75)
7	Brian Scott	883 (–79)
8	Trevor Bayne	868 (–94)
9	Kyle Larson	822 (–140)
10	Parker Kligerman	783 (–179)
Official driver's standings

- Note: Only the first 10 positions are included for the driver standings.

Previous race: 2013 Dollar General 300 (Chicagoland)	NASCAR Nationwide Series; 2013 season	Next race: 2013 5-hour Energy 200 (September)
