= 2013 Dollar General 300 (Charlotte) =

30th race of the 2013 NASCAR Nationwide Series

Race details
- Race 30 of 33 of the 2013 NASCAR Nationwide Series
- Date: October 11, 2013
- Official name: 32nd Annual Dollar General 300
- Location: Concord, North Carolina, Charlotte Motor Speedway
- Course: Permanent racing facility
- Course length: 1.5 miles (2.41 km)
- Distance: 200 laps, 300 mi (482.803 km)
- Scheduled distance: 200 laps, 300 mi (482.803 km)
- Average speed: 133.449 miles per hour (214.765 km/h)

Pole position
Driver	Kyle Busch	Joe Gibbs Racing
- Time: 29.446

Most laps led
Driver	Sam Hornish Jr.	Penske Racing
- Laps: 76

Winner
No. 54	Kyle Busch	Joe Gibbs Racing

Television in the United States
- Network: ESPN2
- Announcers: Allen Bestwick, Dale Jarrett, Andy Petree

Radio in the United States
- Radio: Performance Racing Network

The 2013 Dollar General 300 was the 30th stock car race of the 2013 NASCAR Nationwide Series and the 32nd iteration of the event. The race was held on Friday, October 11, 2013, in Concord, North Carolina at Charlotte Motor Speedway, a 1.5 miles (2.4 km) permanent quad-oval. The race took the scheduled 200 laps to complete. At race's end, Kyle Busch, driving for Joe Gibbs Racing, would complete a late-race pass on eventual third-place driver, Penske Racing's Sam Hornish Jr., to win his 62nd career NASCAR Nationwide Series win and his 11th win of the season. To fill out the podium, Austin Dillon of Richard Childress Racing would finish third.

== Background ==
The layout of Charlotte Motor Speedway, the venue where the race was held.

The race was held at Charlotte Motor Speedway, located in Concord, North Carolina. The speedway complex includes a 1.5-mile (2.4 km) quad-oval track that was utilized for the race, as well as a dragstrip and a dirt track. The speedway was built in 1959 by Bruton Smith and is considered the home track for NASCAR with many race teams based in the Charlotte metropolitan area. The track is owned and operated by Speedway Motorsports Inc. (SMI) with Marcus G. Smith serving as track president.

=== Entry list ===
- (R) denotes rookie driver.
- (i) denotes driver who is ineligible for series driver points.

#	Driver	Team	Make	Sponsor
00	Blake Koch	SR² Motorsports	Toyota	SupportMilitary.org, Heroes Behind the Camo
01	Mike Wallace	JD Motorsports	Chevrolet	Bojangles
2	Brian Scott	Richard Childress Racing	Chevrolet	Charter
3	Austin Dillon	Richard Childress Racing	Chevrolet	AdvoCare
4	Landon Cassill	JD Motorsports	Chevrolet	Dale's Pale Ale
5	Brad Sweet	JR Motorsports	Chevrolet	Great Clips
6	Trevor Bayne	Roush Fenway Racing	Ford	Cargill "Our Certified Ground Beef"
7	Regan Smith	JR Motorsports	Chevrolet	Goody's Headache Relief Shot
10	Jeff Green	TriStar Motorsports	Toyota	TriStar Motorsports
11	Elliott Sadler	Joe Gibbs Racing	Toyota	OneMain Financial
12	Sam Hornish Jr.	Penske Racing	Ford	Detroit Genuine Parts
14	Eric McClure	TriStar Motorsports	Toyota	Hefty Ultimate with Arm & Hammer
16	Ryan Reed	Roush Fenway Racing	Ford	Lilly Diabetes
17	Tanner Berryhill	Vision Racing	Dodge	National Cash Lenders, Bear With Me
18	Matt Kenseth (i)	Joe Gibbs Racing	Toyota	GameStop, Call of Duty: Ghosts
19	Mike Bliss	TriStar Motorsports	Toyota	TriStar Motorsports
20	Brian Vickers	Joe Gibbs Racing	Toyota	Dollar General
22	Joey Logano (i)	Penske Racing	Ford	Discount Tire
23	Robert Richardson Jr.	R3 Motorsports	Chevrolet	North Texas Pipe
24	Ken Butler III	SR² Motorsports	Toyota	SupportMilitary.org, Heroes Behind the Camo
30	Nelson Piquet Jr. (R)	Turner Scott Motorsports	Chevrolet	Worx Yard Tools
31	Justin Allgaier	Turner Scott Motorsports	Chevrolet	Brandt Professional Agriculture
32	Kyle Larson (R)	Turner Scott Motorsports	Chevrolet	Target
33	Kevin Harvick (i)	Richard Childress Racing	Chevrolet	Fast Fixin'
34	James Buescher (i)	Turner Scott Motorsports	Chevrolet	Fraternal Order of Eagles
40	T. J. Bell	The Motorsports Group	Chevrolet	The Motorsports Group
42	Josh Wise	The Motorsports Group	Chevrolet	The Motorsports Group
43	Michael Annett	Richard Petty Motorsports	Ford	Pilot Travel Centers
44	Chad Hackenbracht (i)	TriStar Motorsports	Toyota	Ingersoll Rand
46	J. J. Yeley (i)	The Motorsports Group	Chevrolet	The Motorsports Group
50	Danny Efland	MAKE Motorsports	Chevrolet	Defiant Whiskey
51	Jeremy Clements	Jeremy Clements Racing	Chevrolet	Flex Seal
52	Joey Gase	Jimmy Means Racing	Toyota	LifeShare, Donate Life
54	Kyle Busch (i)	Joe Gibbs Racing	Toyota	Monster Energy
55	Jamie Dick	Viva Motorsports	Chevrolet	Viva Motorsports
60	Travis Pastrana	Roush Fenway Racing	Ford	Roush Fenway Racing
70	Johanna Long	ML Motorsports	Chevrolet	Foretravel Motorcoach
73	Derrike Cope	Creation-Cope Racing	Chevrolet	Frontline Wraps
74	Kevin Lepage	Mike Harmon Racing	Dodge	Mike Harmon Racing
77	Parker Kligerman	Kyle Busch Motorsports	Toyota	Toyota
79	Jeffrey Earnhardt R)	Go Green Racing	Ford	Uponor
87	Joe Nemechek	NEMCO Motorsports	Toyota	Wood Pellet Grills
92	Dexter Stacey (R)	KH Motorsports	Ford	Maddie's Place Rocks
95	Reed Sorenson	Leavine Family Racing	Ford	WRL General Contractors, Jetset Getset
98	Kevin Swindell R)	Biagi-DenBeste Racing	Ford	Carroll Shelby Engine Company, Morgan Frazier "Hey Bully"
99	Alex Bowman (R)	RAB Racing	Toyota	St. Jude Children's Research Hospital, Finishline Collision Repair
Official entry list

== Practice ==
=== First practice ===
The first practice session was held on Thursday, October 10, at 2:00 PM EST, and would last for an hour and 20 minutes. Alex Bowman of RAB Racing would set the fastest time in the session, with a lap of 29.594 and an average speed of 182.469 miles per hour (293.655 km/h).

Pos.	#	Driver	Team	Make	Time	Speed
1	99	Alex Bowman (R)	RAB Racing	Toyota	29.594	182.469
2	6	Trevor Bayne	Roush Fenway Racing	Ford	29.623	182.291
3	5	Brad Sweet	JR Motorsports	Chevrolet	29.634	182.223
Full first practice results

=== Second and final practice ===
The second and final practice session, sometimes known as Happy Hour, was held on Thursday, October 10, at 6:10 PM EST, and would last for 50 minutes. Austin Dillon of Richard Childress Racing would set the fastest time in the session, with a lap of 29.606 and an average speed of 182.395 miles per hour (293.536 km/h).

Pos.	#	Driver	Team	Make	Time	Speed
1	3	Austin Dillon	Richard Childress Racing	Chevrolet	29.606	182.395
2	12	Sam Hornish Jr.	Penske Racing	Ford	29.617	182.328
3	54	Kyle Busch (i)	Joe Gibbs Racing	Toyota	29.676	181.965
Full Happy Hour practice results

== Qualifying ==
Qualifying was held on Friday, October 11, at 4:05 PM EST. Each driver would have two laps to set a fastest time; the fastest of the two would count as their official qualifying lap.

Kyle Busch of Joe Gibbs Racing would win the pole, setting a time of 29.446 and an average speed of 183.387 miles per hour (295.133 km/h).

Six drivers would fail to qualify: Josh Wise, Joey Gase, J. J. Yeley, Dexter Stacey, Danny Efland, and Derrike Cope.

=== Full qualifying results ===
Pos.	#	Driver	Team	Make	Time	Speed
1	54	Kyle Busch (i)	Joe Gibbs Racing	Toyota	29.446	183.387
2	22	Joey Logano (i)	Penske Racing	Ford	29.450	183.362
3	12	Sam Hornish Jr.	Penske Racing	Ford	29.517	182.945
4	3	Austin Dillon	Richard Childress Racing	Chevrolet	29.556	182.704
5	7	Regan Smith	JR Motorsports	Chevrolet	29.637	182.205
6	99	Alex Bowman R)	RAB Racing	Toyota	29.724	181.671
7	6	Trevor Bayne	Roush Fenway Racing	Ford	29.789	181.275
8	32	Kyle Larson (R)	Turner Scott Motorsports	Chevrolet	29.823	181.068
9	20	Brian Vickers	Joe Gibbs Racing	Toyota	29.844	180.941
10	33	Kevin Harvick (i)	Richard Childress Racing	Chevrolet	29.851	180.898
11	2	Brian Scott	Richard Childress Racing	Chevrolet	29.867	180.802
12	31	Justin Allgaier	Turner Scott Motorsports	Chevrolet	29.966	180.204
13	77	Parker Kligerman	Kyle Busch Motorsports	Toyota	30.097	179.420
14	43	Michael Annett	Richard Petty Motorsports	Ford	30.131	179.217
15	18	Matt Kenseth (i)	Joe Gibbs Racing	Toyota	30.203	178.790
16	16	Ryan Reed	Roush Fenway Racing	Ford	30.220	178.690
17	98	Kevin Swindell R)	Biagi-DenBeste Racing	Ford	30.314	178.136
18	17	Tanner Berryhill	Vision Racing	Dodge	30.372	177.795
19	44	Chad Hackenbracht (i)	TriStar Motorsports	Toyota	30.390	177.690
20	4	Landon Cassill	JD Motorsports	Chevrolet	30.391	177.684
21	95	Reed Sorenson	Leavine Family Racing	Ford	30.392	177.678
22	10	Jeff Green	TriStar Motorsports	Toyota	30.397	177.649
23	14	Eric McClure	TriStar Motorsports	Toyota	30.403	177.614
24	19	Mike Bliss	TriStar Motorsports	Toyota	30.413	177.556
25	01	Mike Wallace	JD Motorsports	Chevrolet	30.415	177.544
26	51	Jeremy Clements	Jeremy Clements Racing	Chevrolet	30.419	177.521
27	70	Johanna Long	ML Motorsports	Chevrolet	30.421	177.509
28	30	Nelson Piquet Jr. R)	Turner Scott Motorsports	Chevrolet	30.430	177.456
29	87	Joe Nemechek	NEMCO Motorsports	Toyota	30.509	176.997
30	34	James Buescher (i)	Turner Scott Motorsports	Chevrolet	30.537	176.835
31	60	Travis Pastrana	Roush Fenway Racing	Ford	30.571	176.638
32	55	Jamie Dick	Viva Motorsports	Chevrolet	30.580	176.586
33	00	Blake Koch	SR² Motorsports	Toyota	30.713	175.821
34	79	Jeffrey Earnhardt R)	Go Green Racing	Ford	30.783	175.421
35	40	T. J. Bell	The Motorsports Group	Chevrolet	31.119	173.527
Qualified by owner's points
36	23	Robert Richardson Jr.	R3 Motorsports	Chevrolet	31.248	172.811
37	11	Elliott Sadler	Joe Gibbs Racing	Toyota	—	—
38	5	Brad Sweet	JR Motorsports	Chevrolet	—	—
39	24	Ken Butler III	SR² Motorsports	Toyota	—	—
Last car to qualify on time
40	74	Kevin Lepage	Mike Harmon Racing	Dodge	30.756	175.575
Failed to qualify
41	42	Josh Wise	The Motorsports Group	Chevrolet	30.814	175.245
42	52	Joey Gase	Jimmy Means Racing	Toyota	30.987	174.267
43	46	J. J. Yeley (i)	The Motorsports Group	Chevrolet	31.027	174.042
44	92	Dexter Stacey (R)	KH Motorsports	Ford	31.200	173.077
45	50	Danny Efland	MAKE Motorsports	Chevrolet	31.613	170.816
46	73	Derrike Cope	Creation-Cope Racing	Chevrolet	—	—
Official starting lineup

== Race results ==
Fin	St	#	Driver	Team	Make	Laps	Led	Status	Pts	Winnings
1	1	54	Kyle Busch (i)	Joe Gibbs Racing	Toyota	200	36	running	0	$73,940
2	4	3	Austin Dillon	Richard Childress Racing	Chevrolet	200	3	running	43	$57,100
3	3	12	Sam Hornish Jr.	Penske Racing	Ford	200	76	running	43	$42,500
4	10	33	Kevin Harvick (i)	Richard Childress Racing	Chevrolet	200	8	running	0	$28,675
5	15	18	Matt Kenseth (i)	Joe Gibbs Racing	Toyota	200	14	running	0	$23,650
6	12	31	Justin Allgaier	Turner Scott Motorsports	Chevrolet	200	0	running	38	$25,275
7	2	22	Joey Logano (i)	Penske Racing	Ford	200	16	running	0	$18,310
8	7	6	Trevor Bayne	Roush Fenway Racing	Ford	200	1	running	37	$22,970
9	13	77	Parker Kligerman	Kyle Busch Motorsports	Toyota	200	0	running	35	$21,800
10	14	43	Michael Annett	Richard Petty Motorsports	Ford	200	0	running	34	$22,000
11	30	34	James Buescher (i)	Turner Scott Motorsports	Chevrolet	200	0	running	0	$14,050
12	11	2	Brian Scott	Richard Childress Racing	Chevrolet	200	0	running	32	$19,450
13	8	32	Kyle Larson (R)	Turner Scott Motorsports	Chevrolet	200	17	running	32	$19,950
14	16	16	Ryan Reed	Roush Fenway Racing	Ford	200	0	running	30	$18,525
15	24	19	Mike Bliss	TriStar Motorsports	Toyota	200	0	running	29	$19,250
16	17	98	Kevin Swindell R)	Biagi-DenBeste Racing	Ford	200	1	running	29	$20,075
17	27	70	Johanna Long	ML Motorsports	Chevrolet	200	0	running	27	$18,075
18	6	99	Alex Bowman R)	RAB Racing	Toyota	200	0	running	26	$17,725
19	5	7	Regan Smith	JR Motorsports	Chevrolet	200	28	running	26	$17,575
20	26	51	Jeremy Clements	Jeremy Clements Racing	Chevrolet	200	0	running	24	$18,025
21	19	44	Chad Hackenbracht (i)	TriStar Motorsports	Toyota	199	0	running	0	$17,200
22	25	01	Mike Wallace	JD Motorsports	Chevrolet	199	0	running	22	$17,100
23	29	87	Joe Nemechek	NEMCO Motorsports	Toyota	199	0	running	21	$17,000
24	31	60	Travis Pastrana	Roush Fenway Racing	Ford	199	0	running	20	$16,900
25	28	30	Nelson Piquet Jr. R)	Turner Scott Motorsports	Chevrolet	199	0	running	19	$17,275
26	38	5	Brad Sweet	JR Motorsports	Chevrolet	199	0	running	18	$16,725
27	36	23	Robert Richardson Jr.	R3 Motorsports	Chevrolet	197	0	running	17	$16,600
28	35	40	T. J. Bell	The Motorsports Group	Chevrolet	197	0	running	16	$16,500
29	18	17	Tanner Berryhill	Vision Racing	Dodge	195	0	running	15	$10,425
30	34	79	Jeffrey Earnhardt R)	Go Green Racing	Ford	154	0	engine	14	$16,675
31	9	20	Brian Vickers	Joe Gibbs Racing	Toyota	127	0	crash	13	$16,350
32	20	4	Landon Cassill	JD Motorsports	Chevrolet	125	0	transmission	12	$16,255
33	23	14	Eric McClure	TriStar Motorsports	Toyota	110	0	crash	11	$16,185
34	40	74	Kevin Lepage	Mike Harmon Racing	Dodge	103	0	rear gear	10	$16,140
35	32	55	Jamie Dick	Viva Motorsports	Chevrolet	86	0	crash	9	$10,088
36	37	11	Elliott Sadler	Joe Gibbs Racing	Toyota	64	0	crash	8	$16,450
37	21	95	Reed Sorenson	Leavine Family Racing	Ford	50	0	crash	7	$9,415
38	33	00	Blake Koch	SR² Motorsports	Toyota	4	0	electrical	6	$9,336
39	39	24	Ken Butler III	SR² Motorsports	Toyota	4	0	handling	5	$15,220
40	22	10	Jeff Green	TriStar Motorsports	Toyota	2	0	vibration	4	$9,190
Failed to qualify
41		42	Josh Wise	The Motorsports Group	Chevrolet					
42		52	Joey Gase	Jimmy Means Racing	Toyota					
43		46	J. J. Yeley (i)	The Motorsports Group	Chevrolet					
44		92	Dexter Stacey (R)	KH Motorsports	Ford					
45		50	Danny Efland	MAKE Motorsports	Chevrolet					
46		73	Derrike Cope	Creation-Cope Racing	Chevrolet					
Official race results

== Standings after the race ==
Drivers' Championship standings

Pos	Driver	Points
1	Austin Dillon	1,067
2	Sam Hornish Jr.	1,059 (-8)
3	Regan Smith	1,015 (-52)
4	Justin Allgaier	997 (–70)
5	Elliott Sadler	989 (–78)
6	Trevor Bayne	976 (–91)
7	Brian Scott	974 (–93)
8	Brian Vickers	970 (–97)
9	Kyle Larson	910 (–157)
10	Parker Kligerman	893 (–174)
Official driver's standings

- Note: Only the first 10 positions are included for the driver standings.

Previous race: 2013 Kansas Lottery 300	NASCAR Nationwide Series; 2013 season	Next race: 2013 O'Reilly Auto Parts Challenge
