= 2013 Dollar General 300 =

2013 Dollar General 300 may refer to:

- 2013 Dollar General 300 (Chicagoland)
- 2013 Dollar General 300 (Charlotte)
