= Danny Efland =

American stock car racing driver, engineer and crew chief

- Born: Thomas Daniel Efland; October 4, 1988 (age 38); Irmo, South Carolina, U.S.

NASCAR O'Reilly Auto Parts Series career
- 63 races run over 6 years
- 2013 position: 50th
- Best finish: 21st (2012)
- First race: 2007 Camping World 200 (New Hampshire)
- Last race: 2013 5-hour Energy 200 (Dover)
Wins	Top tens	Poles
0	0	0

NASCAR FedEx Freight Truck Series career
- 10 races run over 2 years
- 2013 position: 102nd
- Best finish: 102nd (2013)
- First race: 2009 Toyota Tundra 200 (Nashville)
- Last race: 2013 EnjoyIllinois.com 225 (Chicagoland)
Wins	Top tens	Poles
0	0	0
- Statistics up to date as of January 24, 2025.

Thomas Daniel Efland (born October 4, 1988) is an American former professional stock car racing driver, engineer and crew chief who works for Viking Motorsports as the crew chief of their No. 99 Chevrolet Camaro SS driven by Parker Retzlaff in the NASCAR O'Reilly Auto Parts Series. Efland formerly competed as a driver in USAR Pro Cup, what is now the NASCAR O'Reilly Auto Parts Series, and the NASCAR Truck Series. He previously worked as an engineer and interim crew chief for Richard Childress Racing and Petty GMS Motorsports / Legacy Motor Club.

== Racing career ==
From 1999 to 2002, Efland won seven state championships as well as five National World Karting Association championships. Moving on to the Pro 4 Mod class at Florence Motor Speedway in 2002, he won the track championship as well as rookie of the year honors. He won his first late model race in 2005, and went on to win eight more races in 2006.

In 2007, Efland made his Busch Series debut at New Hampshire International Speedway. Driving the No. 01 Chevrolet for JD Motorsports, he started 36th and finished 40th after retiring due to handling problems. He ran two more races that season and failed to finish either of them. In 2008, he returned to JD and competed in 18 races. Success was hard to find and he only managed a best finish of 23rd at Lowe's Motor Speedway.

Efland made two start and park efforts for Corrie Stott Racing in the Camping World Truck Series in 2009, finishing 33rd and 31st. Efland returned to the Nationwide Series to run a limited schedule in 2010 and 2011, scoring a best career finish of 16th at Darlington Raceway.

Efland ran a partial Nationwide Series schedule in 2012 in the No. 4 Chevrolet for JD Motorsports. His best finishes came both Daytona races in 13th position. He also picked up a strong finish at Talladega in 16th and a 14th-place finish at Kansas in October.

It was announced on January 21, 2013 that Efland would return to the No. 4 JD Motorsports Chevrolet in 27 of the 33 races for the 2013 NASCAR Nationwide Series season, but he was released from the team in late March. He would run part-time for Mike Harmon Racing and later MAKE Motorsports for the rest of the year. Efland also returned to the Truck Series at Kansas Speedway, driving the No. 6 for Eddie Sharp Racing. This ended up being his last year driving in NASCAR.

In March 2014, Efland joined Richard Childress Racing, working as an engineer for the team's No. 33 Chevrolet in the Nationwide Series. In 2016, he would get to serve as interim crew chief for the No. 3 car driven by Ty Dillon in two races.

In 2022, Efland worked for Petty GMS Motorsports as the engineer for the No. 43 car driven by Erik Jones. In the race at Pocono, Efland served as the interim crew chief for the team after crew chief Dave Elenz was suspended for the race due to a rocker box assembly violation. Efland would continue with the team, now Legacy Motor Club after Jimmie Johnson became a co-owner of the team, in 2023 as the engineer for Jones and the No. 43 car in 2023 and would serve as the car's interim crew chief at the Chicago Street Course when Dave Elenz served the second race of a two-race suspension.

On October 2, 2024, it was announced that Efland would be the crew chief of the No. 15 (renumbered in January 2025 to the No. 25) AM Racing car in the Xfinity Series in 2025 driven by Harrison Burton. This would be his first permanent crew chief job after having previously served as an interim crew chief with RCR and Petty GMS/LMC.

== Personal life ==
Efland graduated with honors from Dutch Fork High School and graduated from the University of South Carolina with a degree in engineering.

== Motorsports career results ==
=== NASCAR ===
(key) (Bold – Pole position awarded by qualifying time. Italics – Pole position earned by points standings or practice time. * – Most laps led.)

==== Nationwide Series ====
NASCAR Nationwide Series results
Year	Team	No.	Make	1	2	3	4	5	6	7	8	9	10	11	12	13	14	15	16	17	18	19	20	21	22	23	24	25	26	27	28	29	30	31	32	33	34	35	NNSC	Pts	Ref
2007	D.D.L. Motorsports	01	Chevy	DAY	CAL	MXC	LVS	ATL	BRI	NSH	TEX	PHO	TAL	RCH	DAR	CLT	DOV	NSH	KEN	MLW; DNQ	NHA; 40	DAY	CHI	GTW; 43	IRP	CGV	GLN	MCH	BRI	CAL	RCH	DOV; 36	KAN	CLT	MEM	TEX	PHO	HOM	122nd	132	
2008	JD Motorsports	0	Chevy	DAY	CAL	LVS	ATL	BRI	NSH; 37	TEX	PHO	MXC	TAL	RCH; 41	DAR; 35	CLT; 43	DOV	NSH; 39	KEN; 42	MLW	NHA	DAY															PHO; DNQ		43rd	1152	
2008	JD Motorsports	01	Chevy																				CHI; 33	GTW; 38	IRP; 31	CGV	GLN	MCH; 28	BRI; 30	CAL; 27	RCH; 37	DOV; 26	KAN; 26	CLT; 23	MEM	TEX; 33		HOM; 25	43rd	1152	
2010	Corrie Stott Racing	02	Chevy	DAY; 21																																			63rd	628	
2010	Danny Efland Racing	07	Chevy		CAL; 41	LVS; 23	BRI	NSH	PHO	TEX; 38	TAL	RCH	DAR; 26	DOV	CLT; 31	NSH	KEN	ROA	NHA	DAY; 33	CHI	GTW	IRP	IOW	GLN	MCH; 41	BRI	CGV	ATL	RCH; DNQ	DOV	KAN	CAL; 39	CLT	GTY	TEX; 41	PHO	HOM	63rd	628	
2011	Jimmy Means Racing	52	Chevy	DAY	PHO	LVS	BRI	CAL	TEX	TAL; 21	NSH	RCH																											34th	144	
2011	Go Green Racing	39	Ford										DAR; 16	DOV; 23	IOW	CLT; 19	CHI	MCH; 33	ROA				NSH; 26	IRP	IOW	GLN	CGV	BRI	ATL	RCH	CHI	DOV	KAN	CLT	TEX	PHO	HOM		34th	144	
2011	Danny Efland Racing	07	Chevy																	DAY; 30																			34th	144	
2011	Key Motorsports	47	Chevy																		KEN; DNQ																		34th	144	
2011	Go Green Racing	04	Ford																			NHA; 40																	34th	144	
2012	JD Motorsports	4	Chevy	DAY; 13	PHO	LVS	BRI	CAL	TEX; 31	RCH	TAL; 16	DAR; 20	IOW	CLT; 35	DOV	MCH; 27	ROA	KEN; 34	DAY; 13	NHA; 29	CHI; 32	IND	IOW	GLN	CGV	BRI	ATL; 19	RCH	CHI; 27	KEN; 30		CLT; 31	KAN; 14	TEX; 28	PHO	HOM; 31			21st	327	
2012	Randy Hill Racing	08	Ford																												DOV; 35								21st	327	
2013	JD Motorsports	4	Chevy	DAY; 25	PHO	LVS	BRI; DNQ	CAL	TEX	RCH	TAL																												50th	78	
2013	Mike Harmon Racing	74	Chevy									DAR; 27	CLT	DOV; 27	IOW	MCH	ROA	KEN	DAY	NHA	CHI	IND																	50th	78	
2013	MAKE Motorsports	50	Chevy																				IOW; 34	GLN	MOH	BRI	ATL; 35	RCH; DNQ	CHI	KEN; DNQ	DOV; 39	KAN	CLT; DNQ	TEX	PHO	HOM			50th	78	

==== Camping World Truck Series ====
NASCAR Camping World Truck Series results
Year	Team	No.	Make	1	2	3	4	5	6	7	8	9	10	11	12	13	14	15	16	17	18	19	20	21	22	23	24	25	NCWTC	Pts	Ref
2009	Corrie Stott Racing	02	Chevy	DAY	CAL	ATL	MAR	KAN	CLT	DOV	TEX	MCH	MLW	MEM	KEN	IRP	NSH; 33	BRI	CHI	IOW	GTW	NHA	LVS; 31	MAR	TAL	TEX	PHO	HOM	115th	0	
2013	MAKE Motorsports	6	Chevy	DAY	MAR	CAR	KAN; 28																						102nd	0^{1}	
2013	MAKE Motorsports	50	Chevy					CLT; 20	DOV; 33						MCH; 33	BRI	MSP	IOW	CHI; 33	LVS	TAL; DNQ	MAR	TEX	PHO	HOM				102nd	0^{1}	
2013	MAKE Motorsports	84	Chevy							TEX; 31	KEN; 33	IOW; 33	ELD	POC															102nd	0^{1}	

^{*} Season still in progress
^{1} Ineligible for series points
