= T. J. Duke =

American stock car racing driver

- Born: September 21, 1993 (age 33); Southwest Ranches, Florida, U.S.

NASCAR O'Reilly Auto Parts Series career
- 3 races run over 2 years
- 2013 position: 74th
- Best finish: 67th (2011)
- First race: 2011 WYPALL 200 (Phoenix)
- Last race: 2013 5-hour Energy 200 (Dover)
Wins	Top tens	Poles
0	0	0

NASCAR FedEx Freight Truck Series career
- 2 races run over 2 years
- 2012 position: 73rd
- Best finish: 73rd (2012)
- First race: 2011 Kroger 200 (Martinsville)
- Last race: 2012 NextEra Energy Resources 250 (Daytona)
Wins	Top tens	Poles
0	0	0
- Statistics up to date as of November 16, 2013.

T. J. Duke III (born September 21, 1993) is an American professional stock car racing driver. He has driven in the NASCAR Nationwide Series for Key Motorsports and Go Green Racing, the NASCAR Camping World Truck Series for SS-Green Light Racing and has also raced late models around Florida.

== Racing career ==
=== NASCAR ===
Duke started his Truck career at the age of eighteen, driving for SS-Green Light Racing at Martinsville Speedway. With funding from Merrill Lynch, he finished 34th of 36 trucks, 41 laps behind race winner Denny Hamlin. Three weeks later, Duke was hired by Key Motorsports to drive the team's No. 40 car in the penultimate race of the 2011 season at Phoenix. He avoided multiple crashes to finish 23rd, and turned in another top-30 effort the following week at Homestead-Miami Speedway.

A return to SS-Green Light was in store for 2012, as Duke ran the season-opening NextEra Energy Resources 250 but was swept up in one of the race's many crashes. Although he didn't return to NASCAR that year, he continued racing, competing in the super late model division at Citrus County Speedway.

In 2013, Duke returned for one race at Dover International Speedway with Go Green Racing, finishing 25th.

=== After NASCAR ===
Duke has continued to run late models around the southeast, competing around tracks like New Smyrna Speedway.

== Motorsports career results ==
=== Stock car career summary ===
Season	Series	Team	Races	Wins	Top 5	Top 10	Points	Position
2011	NASCAR Camping World Truck Series	SS-Green Light Racing	1	0	0	0	0	NC†
2011	NASCAR Nationwide Series	Key Motorsports	3	0	0	0	37	67th
2012	NASCAR Camping World Truck Series	SS-Green Light Racing	1	0	0	0	13	73rd
2013	NASCAR Nationwide Series	Go Green Racing	1	0	0	0	19	74th
2019	CARS Super Late Model Tour	N/A	1	0	0	0	22	34th
2020	CARS Super Late Model Tour	Walker Motorsports	2	0	0	1	39	17th
2021	CARS Super Late Model Tour	Walker Motorsports	2	0	1	2	54	14th
2025	CARS Pro Late Model Tour	Jeff Fultz	2	0	1	1	65	30th
2026	CARS Pro Late Model Tour	Duke Racing	1	0	0	0	19	72nd

^{†} As Duke was a guest driver, he was ineligible for championship points.

=== NASCAR ===
(key) (Bold – Pole position awarded by qualifying time. Italics – Pole position earned by points standings or practice time. * – Most laps led.)

==== Nationwide Series ====
NASCAR Nationwide Series results
Year	Team	No.	Make	1	2	3	4	5	6	7	8	9	10	11	12	13	14	15	16	17	18	19	20	21	22	23	24	25	26	27	28	29	30	31	32	33	34	NNSC	Pts	Ref
2011	Key Motorsports	40	Chevy	DAY	PHO	LVS	BRI	CAL	TEX	TAL	NSH	RCH	DAR	DOV	IOW	CLT	CHI	MCH	ROA	DAY	KEN	NHA	NSH	IRP	IOW	GLN	CGV	BRI	ATL	RCH	CHI	DOV	KAN	CLT	TEX	PHO; 23	HOM; 28	67th	37	
2013	Go Green Racing	79	Ford	DAY	PHO	LVS	BRI	CAL	TEX	RCH	TAL	DAR	CLT	DOV	IOW	MCH	ROA	KEN	DAY	NHA	CHI	IND	IOW	GLN	MOH	BRI	ATL	RCH	CHI	KEN	DOV; 25	KAN	CLT	TEX	PHO	HOM		74th	19	

==== Camping World Truck Series ====
NASCAR Camping World Truck Series results
Year	Team	No.	Make	1	2	3	4	5	6	7	8	9	10	11	12	13	14	15	16	17	18	19	20	21	22	23	24	25	NCWTC	Pts	Ref
2011	SS-Green Light Racing	07	Toyota	DAY	PHO	DAR	MAR	NSH	DOV	CLT	KAN	TEX	KEN	IOW	NSH	IRP	POC	MCH	BRI	ATL	CHI	NHA	KEN	LVS	TAL	MAR; 34	TEX	HOM	112th	0^{1}	
2012	SS-Green Light Racing	07	Chevy	DAY; 31	MAR	CAR	KAN	CLT	DOV	TEX	KEN	IOW	CHI	POC	MCH	BRI	ATL	IOW	KEN	LVS	TAL	MAR	TEX	PHO	HOM				73rd	13	

=== CARS Super Late Model Tour ===
(key)

CARS Super Late Model Tour results
Year	Team	No.	Make	1	2	3	4	5	6	7	8	CSLMTC	Pts	Ref
2019	N/A	4D	Chevy	SNM	HCY	NSH	MMS	BRI	HCY; 11	ROU	SBO	34th	22	
2020	Walker Motorsports	28	Toyota	SNM	HCY	JEN	HCY; 9	FCS	BRI; 18	FLC	NSH	17th	39	
2021	Walker Motorsports	28	Toyota	HCY; 4	GPS; 8	NSH	JEN	HCY	MMS	TCM	SBO	14th	54	

=== CARS Pro Late Model Tour ===
(key)

CARS Pro Late Model Tour results
Year	Team	No.	Make	1	2	3	4	5	6	7	8	9	10	11	12	13	CPLMTC	Pts	Ref
2025	Jeff Fultz	28D	N/A	AAS	CDL	OCS; 14	ACE	NWS	CRW	HCY	HCY	AND	FLC	SBO			30th	65	
2025	Jeff Fultz	28	N/A												TCM; 5	NWS	30th	65	
2026	Duke Racing	28	N/A	SNM	NSV	CRW	ACE	NWS; 23	HCY	AND	FLC	TCM	NPS	SBO			72nd	19	

=== ASA STARS National Tour ===
(key) (Bold – Pole position awarded by qualifying time. Italics – Pole position earned by points standings or practice time. * – Most laps led. ** – All laps led.)

ASA STARS National Tour results
Year	Team	No.	Make	1	2	3	4	5	6	7	8	9	10	ASNTC	Pts	Ref
2023	Terry Duke	28D	Chevy	FIF	MAD	NWS	HCY	MLW	AND	WIR	TOL	WIN	NSV; 12	71st	40	

^{*} Season still in progress
^{1} Ineligible for series points
