= Pillow Pets =

Brand of stuffed toys that are convertible to pillows

- Type: Stuffed toy
- Invented by: Jennifer Telfer
- Company: CJ Products
- Country: United States
- Availability: 2003–present
- Materials: Chenille
- Slogan: It's a Pillow. It's a Pet... It's a Pillow Pet.
- Official website

Pillow Pets are a brand of stuffed toys with velcro straps which enable them to be converted from a decorative pillow into a stuffed animal. The toys are made from chenille. They were invented by Jennifer Telfer in 2003. They first gained success when Telfer personally sold the toys close to the Christmas season of that year. They would later become more successful through television advertising, where the company's slogan, "It's a pillow, it's a pet, it's a Pillow Pet!" was featured in every ad since 2009. Pillow Pets have been used for charitable fund raising.

== History ==
In 2003, Jennifer Telfer was living in San Diego with her husband, Clint, and two sons. In an interview with CNBC, Telfer states that she came up with the idea of functional stuffed toys when her oldest son, then seven, flattened out one of his stuffed animals from sleeping with it often. She decided on a combination of a pillow and a stuffed animal as the concept for Pillow Pets. Telfer and her husband proposed a meeting with a plush manufacturer at a tradeshow in Las Vegas, and decided to wholesale the toys themselves through their company, CJ Products (CJ is a combination of their first initials). Following the meeting, the Telfers were prepared to sell the first toys.

The first Pillow Pet was "Snuggly Puppy". In the Christmas season, Jennifer Telfer first sold Pillow Pets at mall kiosks, but failed to sell them all: "Every single parent would walk up, and their kids would love them. [The parents would] say, 'No, it's just another stuffed animal.' because they didn't know that it opened up to a pillow." A few weeks later, Telfer discovered that the Pillow Pets were most profitable during the period after Christmas when they were almost sold out at home shows. She later ordered a container of 7,000 Pillow Pets, now in six different animal varieties, and sold all of them in three months. By the end of 2010, CJ Products earned $300,000 in gross sales.

According to Telfer, In 2009, CJ Products started using television advertising to promote the Pillow Pets. Commercials aired on children's cable networks such as Nickelodeon and Cartoon Network, and family-oriented networks such as Destination America. Partly because of the ads, gross sales of $7,000,000 were recorded at the end of 2009. Telfer recalled: "I didn't realize that we were gonna be at this level, or people would love my idea as much as I loved it."

In 2012, Dream Lite Pillow Pets were introduced, along with Glow Pets in 2013.

In 2018, Dreamworks partnered with CJ Products to release a line of Pillow Pets as characters from the movie Trolls.

== Product ==
A "Snuggly Puppy" dog pillow pet. Shown for reference

An ordinary Pillow Pet is made with chenille fabric. Underneath it is a velcro strap. Given that it starts in pillow position, its strap fastens to the other side in order to transform it into a stuffed toy. If the strap is unfastened again, the Pillow Pet can again be used as a pillow. The original release of Pillow Pets included merely six varieties. Now, more than one hundred varieties of Pillow Pets have been sold by CJ Products. Current varieties range from scented to body pillow pets. There are licensed Pillow Pets for MLB, NFL, NHL and NCAA sports teams. There are also themed Pillow Pets based on Disney characters, Thomas the Tank Engine, Scooby-Doo, Dora the Explorer, and SpongeBob SquarePants as well. Aside from different themed Pets, they offer a diverse range of different sized Pets. These different sizes range from 11 inches, 14 inches, 18 inches and even 30 inches. The largest of these pets are from their Jumboz Plush set. Pillow Pets even offer different styles such as BodyPillars which are elongated and Pet Beds. Pet Beds are BPA and Phthalates free. CJ Products has also licensed Pillow Pets for three English Premier League football clubs. Besides stuffed animals, other products bear the Pillow Pets name, such as blankets, slippers, hats, and print pajamas. Brush Pets, which are toothbrushes based on Pillow Pets were also products. Three Pillow Pets books and two board games are also available. In late October 2011, a Pillow Pets video game was released for Nintendo DS. In 2016, a shortly lived web browser game titled Pillow Pets World launched, featuring interactive Pillow Pet related games for children to play for free. As of 2018, it was no longer accessible.

== Charity work ==
CJ Products are known for their charity work, as they have donated Pillow Pets to many causes. In addition to CJ Products, the public have also donated Pillow Pets to help others.

=== Indirect ===
In December 2010, Michele McFarland, a human resources worker for the Baltimore County Department of Social Services, and her family, all from Catonsville, Maryland, started a Pillow Pet drive to help children at the Johns Hopkins Hospital. Their initial goal was to donate 200 toys, but they actually donated 250 Pillow Pets to the hospital in time for Christmas Eve. According to McFarland, residents of New York, New Jersey, Florida, and Georgia helped contribute. A year later, it was announced that McFarland aimed to donate even more Pillow Pets to five hospitals, including Johns Hopkins, by Christmas. She became affiliated with the Casey Cares Foundation and ordered 1,400 Pillow Pets to help the hospitals.

Jacob McConahay (then seven) and his family accepted donations of Pillow Pets in the Riley Hospital for Children, in Indianapolis, where Jacob was diagnosed with an aggressive form of cancer. An early childhood volunteer mentioned that Jacob's goal was 1,000 Pillow Pets. CJ Products had heard about Jacob's goal, and they committed to matching the number of Pillow Pets that he collected. McConahay's wish to help children in the Riley Hospital inspired students at China Grove Middle School in North Carolina to donate Pillow Pets to patients at the Jeff Gordon Children's Hospital. Jacob died on August 31, 2011. As of November 2011 his family has collected over 140,000 Pillow Pets in his name.

=== Direct ===
Following the 2011 Tōhoku earthquake and tsunami in Japan, CJ Products, The Today Show, and the American Red Cross, collaborated to support relief efforts. Pillow Pets announced that they would donate one dollar of every purchase of a Pillow Pet on their website, on March 17 and 18, 2011, to the American Red Cross. They also auctioned five Pillow Pets on the same days, and the money also went to the American Red Cross.

Since 2008, Pillow Pets has collaborated with the Family Reach Foundation to help families of children to fight cancer. In September 2011, the foundation received a donation of 6,200 Pillow Pets and was able to generate thousands of dollars in funds. Carla Tardif, the Foundations' director of development and special programs, stated a consideration of initiatives to create more promotion of Family Reach's cause and raise charitable funds for families worldwide. "We applaud the tremendous amount of work being done by the Family Reach Foundation on behalf of [the] families," Jennifer Telfer said.

== Counterfeits ==
Some toy companies have taken advantage of Pillow Pets' popularity by manufacturing and selling counterfeits. CJ Products have been notified many times of impostor Pillow Pets. Telfer said: "It is priority one for us to protect our brand and deliver the high quality people have come to expect when they see the My Pillow Pets plush folding stuffed animals authentic tag."

In one case, in January 2011, Concord Toys International were accused of selling fake Pillow Pets. Their products were being sold in a warehouse in Queens, New York City and bore the label "Made in China." Private detectives hired by CJ Products tracked the toys to the warehouse, where U.S. marshals seized 17,000 counterfeits. An injunction was signed preventing Concord from manufacturing any forgeries, and CJ Products are seeking punitive damages against the company.

== Awards and accolades ==
Pillow Pets have won several awards for being a child-friendly product. In 2009, Stevanne Auerbach recognized the toy as one of the Best Vacation Toys. Also in 2009, Armin Brott of Mr. Dad awarded the product the Mr. Dad Seal of Approval for Father's Day. Pillow Pets were among toys on Toys R Us's 2010 'Hot Toy' list.
