= Hal Martin =

American racing driver (born 1985)

- Born: December 29, 1985 (age 40) Galliano, Louisiana, U.S.

ARCA Racing Series career
- Debut season: 2009
- Former teams: Cunningham Motorsports, Mark Gibson Racing, Venturini Motorsports
- Starts: 12
- Wins: 0
- Poles: 0
- Best finish: 48th in 2011
- Finished last season: 48th (2011)

NASCAR O'Reilly Auto Parts Series career
- 17 races run over 3 years
- 2014 position: 60th
- Best finish: 35th (2013)
- First race: 2012 Kansas Lottery 300 (Kansas)
- Last race: 2014 U.S. Cellular 250 (Iowa)
| Wins | Top tens | Poles |
|---|---|---|
| 0 | 0 | 0 |

NASCAR FedEx Freight Truck Series career
- 1 race run over 1 year
- Best finish: 94th (2009)
- First race: 2009 MemphisTravel.com 200 (Memphis)
| Wins | Top tens | Poles |
|---|---|---|
| 0 | 0 | 0 |
- Statistics up to date as of June 15, 2020.

Hal Martin (born December 29, 1985) is an American professional stock car racing driver who has competed in what is now the NASCAR Xfinity Series, the Truck Series, and the ARCA Racing Series.

Martin earned the nickname "the Ragin' Cajun" due to being from Louisiana.

== Racing career ==
=== Early career ===
Martin began his racing career when he was 15 years old, racing 80cc and 125cc shifter karts, racing around the Gulf Coast of the United States and winning the 2004 Louisiana State 80cc Shifter Kart Championship. He then went to several driving schools to improve his driving skills as he prepared to move up to full-bodied stock cars, including the Buck Baker Racing School and Andy Hillenburg's Fast Track High Performance Driving School in Rockingham, North Carolina.

In 2007, Martin won the Mobile International Speedway Track Championship in the Pro Late Model Division and was crowned the 2007 Louisiana State Champion by Late Model Digest. He would follow that up with two more wins the following season while competing on various short tracks around the Gulf of Mexico, followed by running some ASA Late Model Series races in 2009 and 2010.

In 2009, Martin graduated from the University of New Orleans with a degree in mechanical engineering.

=== ARCA and NASCAR ===
Following his completion of Hillenburg's driving school, Martin was approved to compete in the ARCA Racing Series. He made his series debut at Mansfield Motorsports Park, finishing in 11th place. He would follow that up in his next race two months later with a 3rd-place finish at Chicagoland Speedway, his best finish to date. While he was competing on various short tracks around the Gulf Coast, Martin was gaining valuable experience on some of the biggest tracks in the country while competing in ARCA, including Daytona, Talladega, and Pocono. In 11 career ARCA starts between 2009 and 2011, Martin has a best starting and finishing position of third place, while also tallying three top-ten finishes.

Martin made his lone Camping World Truck Series start in 2009 at Memphis International Raceway. Driving the No. 48 for Andy Hillenburg's Fast Track Racing Enterprises team, Martin finished 26th in the 36-truck field, competing in just over half the laps of the 200-lap race before retiring from the event due to overheating.

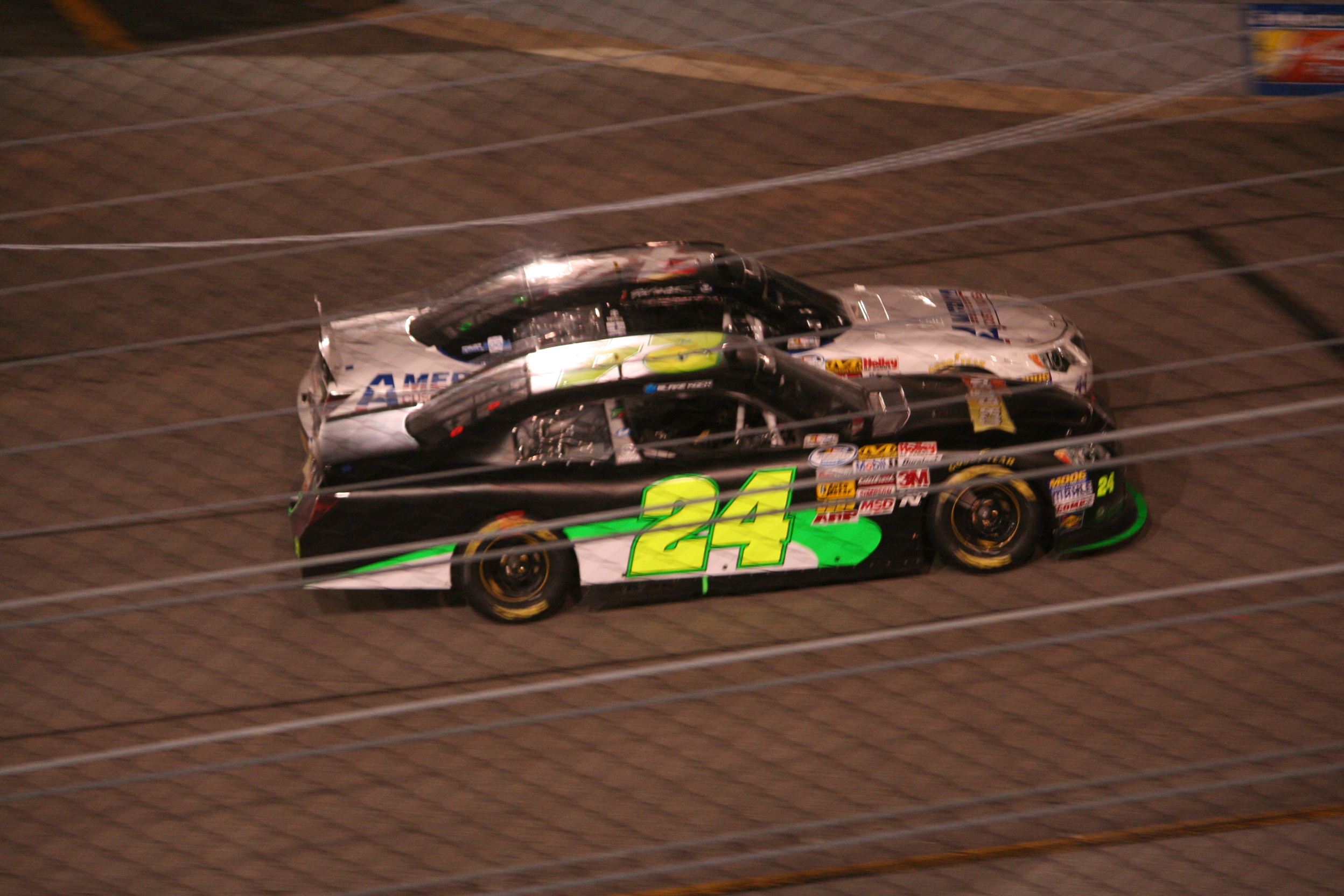
Martin's No. 44 is behind Blake Koch's No. 24. They are racing at Richmond in 2013

Martin made his Nationwide Series debut at Kansas Speedway in 2012, driving the No. 44 car for TriStar Motorsports. His debut ended 24 laps from the finish when he got together with Scott Lagasse Jr. and caused both drivers to hit the wall and crash out of the race, crediting him with a 25th-place finish. He would compete in two more races that season in preparation for a full-time effort in 2013, this time driving the No. 19 car for TriStar Motorsports at Texas and Homestead, finishing in 30th place on both occasions.

After running three races towards the end of 2012, Martin drove full-time for TriStar Motorsports in 2013 competing for Nationwide Rookie of the Year honors, where he was once again paired with veteran crew chief John Quinn. Martin's competition for Rookie of the Year included Jeffrey Earnhardt, grandson of Dale Earnhardt, 2012 K&N Pro Series East champion Kyle Larson and former Formula One driver Nelson Piquet Jr.

=== Team owner career ===
On July 28, 2015, Martin and his former teammate at TriStar, Eric McClure, formed Martin-McClure Racing, a K&N Pro Series East team which fielded the No. 39 car for three years. In the team's final season, 2017, they also bought the No. 13 team of Hunter Baize from HScott Motorsports after that team shut down, and it became a second car for MMR.

== Motorsports career results ==
=== NASCAR ===
(key) (Bold – Pole position awarded by qualifying time. Italics – Pole position earned by points standings or practice time. * – Most laps led.)

==== Nationwide Series ====
NASCAR Nationwide Series results
| Year | Team | No. | Make | 1 | 2 | 3 | 4 | 5 | 6 | 7 | 8 | 9 | 10 | 11 | 12 | 13 | 14 | 15 | 16 | 17 | 18 | 19 | 20 | 21 | 22 | 23 | 24 | 25 | 26 | 27 | 28 | 29 | 30 | 31 | 32 | 33 | NNSC | Pts | Ref |
|---|---|---|---|---|---|---|---|---|---|---|---|---|---|---|---|---|---|---|---|---|---|---|---|---|---|---|---|---|---|---|---|---|---|---|---|---|---|---|---|
| 2012 | TriStar Motorsports | 44 | Toyota | DAY | PHO | LVS | BRI | CAL | TEX | RCH | TAL | DAR | IOW | CLT | DOV | MCH | ROA | KEN | DAY | NHA | CHI | IND | IOW | GLN | CGV | BRI | ATL | RCH | CHI | KEN | DOV | CLT | KAN; 25 | | | | 65th | 47 | |
| 2012 | TriStar Motorsports | 19 | Toyota | | | | | | | | | | | | | | | | | | | | | | | | | | | | | | | TEX; 30 | PHO | HOM; 30 | 65th | 47 | |
| 2013 | TriStar Motorsports | 44 | Toyota | DAY; 28 | PHO; 23 | LVS; 24 | BRI; 31 | CAL; 24 | TEX; 38 | RCH; 24 | TAL; 34 | DAR; 29 | CLT; 23 | DOV | IOW | MCH | ROA | KEN | DAY | NHA | CHI | IND | IOW | GLN | LEX | BRI | ATL | RCH; 30 | CHI | KEN | DOV | KAN; 35 | CLT | TEX | PHO | HOM | 35th | 186 | |
| 2014 | TriStar Motorsports | 44 | Toyota | DAY | PHO | LVS | BRI | CAL | TEX | DAR | RCH | TAL | IOW; 26 | CLT | DOV | MCH | ROA | KEN | DAY | NHA | CHI | IND | IOW; 28 | GLN | MOH | BRI | ATL | RCH | CHI | KEN | DOV | KAN | CLT | TEX | PHO | HOM | 60th | 34 | |

==== Camping World Truck Series ====
NASCAR Camping World Truck Series results
| Year | Team | No. | Make | 1 | 2 | 3 | 4 | 5 | 6 | 7 | 8 | 9 | 10 | 11 | 12 | 13 | 14 | 15 | 16 | 17 | 18 | 19 | 20 | 21 | 22 | 23 | 24 | 25 | NCWTC | Pts | Ref |
|---|---|---|---|---|---|---|---|---|---|---|---|---|---|---|---|---|---|---|---|---|---|---|---|---|---|---|---|---|---|---|---|
| 2009 | Fast Track Racing Enterprises | 48 | Chevy | DAY | FON | ATL | MAR | KAN | CLT | DOV | TEX | MCH | MIL | MEM; 26 | KEN | IRP | NSH | BRI | CHI | IOW | GAT | LOU | LVS | MAR | TAL | TEX | PHO | HOM | 94th | 85 | |

=== ARCA Racing Series ===
(key) (Bold – Pole position awarded by qualifying time. Italics – Pole position earned by points standings or practice time. * – Most laps led.)

ARCA Racing Series results
| Year | Team | No. | Make | 1 | 2 | 3 | 4 | 5 | 6 | 7 | 8 | 9 | 10 | 11 | 12 | 13 | 14 | 15 | 16 | 17 | 18 | 19 | 20 | 21 | ARSC | Pts | Ref |
|---|---|---|---|---|---|---|---|---|---|---|---|---|---|---|---|---|---|---|---|---|---|---|---|---|---|---|---|
| 2009 | Cunningham Motorsports | 4 | Dodge | DAY | SLM | CAR | TAL | KEN | TOL | POC | MCH | MFD; 11 | IOW | KEN | BLN | POC | ISF | CHI; 3 | TOL | DSF | NJE | SLM | KAN; 9 | CAR | 53rd | 575 | |
| 2010 | Mark Gibson Racing | 17 | Dodge | DAY; 35 | | | | | | | | | | | | | | | | | | | | | 56th | 410 | |
| 2010 | Mark Gibson Racing | 59 | Dodge | | PBE; 11 | SLM | TEX | | | | | | | | | | | | | | | | | | 56th | 410 | |
| 2010 | Venturini Motorsports | 35 | Toyota | | | | | TAL; 10 | TOL | POC | MCH | IOW | MFD | POC | BLN | NJE | ISF | CHI; 15 | DSF | TOL | SLM | KAN | CAR | | 56th | 410 | |
| 2011 | Venturini Motorsports | 55 | Toyota | DAY; 30 | TAL; 28 | SLM | TOL | NJE | CHI; 12 | POC; 30 | MCH; 30 | WIN | BLN | IOW | IRP | POC | ISF | MAD | DSF | SLM | KAN | TOL | | | 48th | 505 | |
