= 2013 DRIVE4COPD 300 =

First race of the 2013 NASCAR Nationwide Series season

Race details
- Race 1 of 33 in the 2013 NASCAR Nationwide Series season
- Date: February 23, 2013
- Location: Daytona International Speedway, Daytona Beach, Florida
- Course: Permanent racing facility
- Course length: 2.5 miles (4.02336 km)
- Distance: 120 laps, 300 mi (400 km)
- Weather: Temperatures reading up to 88 °F (31 °C); wind speeds up to 19 miles per hour (31 km/h)
- Average speed: 139.951 mph (225.229 km/h)

Pole position
Driver	Trevor Bayne	Roush Fenway Racing

Most laps led
Driver	Regan Smith	JR Motorsports
- Laps: 23

Winner
No. 33	Tony Stewart	Richard Childress Racing

Television in the United States
- Network: ESPN
- Announcers: Allen Bestwick, Dale Jarrett, Andy Petree
- Nielsen ratings: 2.2 (3.4 million viewers)

The 2013 DRIVE4COPD 300 was a NASCAR Nationwide Series race held on February 23, 2013, at Daytona International Speedway in Daytona Beach, Florida. It was the first race of the 2013 NASCAR Nationwide Series season. The race was the 32nd running of the event, and the pole position given to Roush Fenway Racing's Trevor Bayne with a lap speed of 177.162 mph (285.115 km/h), while Tony Stewart of Richard Childress Racing won the race. Sam Hornish Jr. finished 2nd, and Alex Bowman finished 3rd.

== Background ==
Daytona International Speedway is a race track in Daytona Beach, Florida, United States. Since opening in 1959, it has been the home of the Daytona 500, the most prestigious race in NASCAR as well as its season opening event. In addition to NASCAR, the track also hosts races for ARCA, AMA Superbike, IMSA, SCCA, and Motocross. The track features multiple layouts including the primary 2.500 mi (4.023 km) high-speed tri-oval, a 3.560 mi (5.729 km) sports car course, a 2.950 mi (4.748 km) motorcycle course, and a 1,320 ft (402.3 m) karting and motorcycle flat-track. The track's 180-acre (72.8 ha) infield includes the 29-acre (11.7 ha) Lake Lloyd, which has hosted powerboat racing. The speedway is operated by NASCAR pursuant to a lease with the City of Daytona Beach on the property that runs until 2054. Dale Earnhardt is Daytona International Speedway's all-time winningest driver, with a total of 34 career victories (12- Daytona 500 Qualifying Races) (7- NASCAR Xfinity Series Races) (6- Busch Clash Races) (6- IROC Races) (2- Pepsi 400 July Races) (1- The 1998 Daytona 500).

=== Entry list ===
- (R) denotes rookie driver
- (i) denotes driver who is ineligible for series driver points

#	Driver	Team	Make
00	Jason White	SR² Motorsports	Toyota
01	Mike Wallace	JD Motorsports	Chevrolet
1	Kurt Busch (i)	Phoenix Racing	Chevrolet
2	Brian Scott	Richard Childress Racing	Chevrolet
3	Austin Dillon	Richard Childress Racing	Chevrolet
4	Danny Efland	JD Motorsports	Chevrolet
5	Kasey Kahne (i)	JR Motorsports	Chevrolet
6	Trevor Bayne	Roush Fenway Racing	Ford
7	Regan Smith	JR Motorsports	Chevrolet
8	Scott Lagasse Jr.	Team SLR	Chevrolet
10	Jeff Green	TriStar Motorsports	Toyota
11	Elliott Sadler	Joe Gibbs Racing	Toyota
12	Sam Hornish Jr.	Penske Racing	Ford
14	Eric McClure	TriStar Motorsports	Toyota
15	Juan Carlos Blum (R)	Rick Ware Racing	Ford
18	Matt Kenseth (i)	Joe Gibbs Racing	Toyota
19	Mike Bliss	TriStar Motorsports	Toyota
20	Brian Vickers	Joe Gibbs Racing	Toyota
22	Brad Keselowski (i)	Penske Racing	Ford
23	Robert Richardson Jr. (i)	R3 Motorsports	Chevrolet
24	Blake Koch	SR² Motorsports	Toyota
30	Nelson Piquet Jr. (R)	Turner Scott Motorsports	Chevrolet
31	Justin Allgaier	Turner Scott Motorsports	Chevrolet
32	Kyle Larson (R)	Turner Scott Motorsports	Chevrolet
33	Tony Stewart (i)	Richard Childress Racing	Chevrolet
34	Danica Patrick (i)	Turner Scott Motorsports	Chevrolet
40	Reed Sorenson	The Motorsports Group	Chevrolet
41	Donnie Neuenberger	Rick Ware Racing	Chevrolet
43	Michael Annett	Richard Petty Motorsports	Ford
44	Hal Martin (R)	TriStar Motorsports	Toyota
51	Jeremy Clements	Jeremy Clements Racing	Chevrolet
52	Joey Gase	Hamilton Means Racing	Toyota
54	Kyle Busch (i)	Joe Gibbs Racing	Toyota
55	Jamie Dick	Viva Motorsports with Frank Cicci	Chevrolet
60	Travis Pastrana	Roush Fenway Racing	Ford
70	Johanna Long	ML Motorsports	Chevrolet
74	Mike Harmon	Harmon-Novak Racing	Dodge
77	Parker Kligerman	Kyle Busch Motorsports	Toyota
79	Jeffrey Earnhardt (R)	Go Green Racing	Ford
85	Bobby Gerhart	Gerhart Racing	Chevrolet
87	Joe Nemechek	NEMCO-Jay Robinson Racing	Toyota
88	Dale Earnhardt Jr. (i)	JR Motorsports	Chevrolet
89	Morgan Shepherd	Shepherd Racing Ventures	Dodge
92	Dexter Stacey (R)	KH Motorsports	Ford
99	Alex Bowman (R)	RAB Racing	Toyota
Official Entry list

== Qualifying ==
Trevor Bayne won the pole for the race with a time of 50.801 and a speed of 177.162.

Grid	No.	Driver	Team	Manufacturer	Time	Speed
1	6	Trevor Bayne	Roush Fenway Racing	Ford	50.801	177.162
2	12	Sam Hornish Jr.	Penske Racing	Ford	50.885	176.869
3	77	Parker Kligerman	Kyle Busch Motorsports	Toyota	50.905	176.800
4	60	Travis Pastrana	Roush Fenway Racing	Ford	50.952	176.637
5	3	Austin Dillon	Richard Childress Racing	Chevrolet	51.020	176.401
6	11	Elliott Sadler	Joe Gibbs Racing	Toyota	51.030	176.367
7	54	Kyle Busch (i)	Joe Gibbs Racing	Toyota	51.030	176.367
8	99	Alex Bowman (R)	RAB Racing	Toyota	51.038	176.339
9	18	Matt Kenseth (i)	Joe Gibbs Racing	Toyota	51.042	176.325
10	33	Tony Stewart (i)	Richard Childress Racing	Chevrolet	51.043	176.322
11	22	Brad Keselowski (i)	Penske Racing	Ford	51.043	176.322
12	34	Danica Patrick (i)	Turner Scott Motorsports	Chevrolet	51.067	176.239
13	88	Dale Earnhardt Jr. (i)	JR Motorsports	Chevrolet	51.071	176.225
14	31	Justin Allgaier	Turner Scott Motorsports	Chevrolet	51.078	176.201
15	7	Regan Smith	JR Motorsports	Chevrolet	51.086	176.174
16	10	Jeff Green	TriStar Motorsports	Toyota	51.161	175.915
17	30	Nelson Piquet Jr. (R)	Turner Scott Motorsports	Chevrolet	51.167	175.895
18	55	Jamie Dick	Viva Motorsports with Frank Cicci	Chevrolet	51.195	175.798
19	5	Kasey Kahne (i)	JR Motorsports	Chevrolet	51.202	175.774
20	20	Brian Vickers	Joe Gibbs Racing	Toyota	51.217	175.723
21	32	Kyle Larson (R)	Turner Scott Motorsports	Chevrolet	51.222	175.706
22	43	Michael Annett	Richard Petty Motorsports	Ford	51.266	175.555
23	01	Mike Wallace	JD Motorsports	Chevrolet	51.305	175.421
24	8	Scott Lagasse Jr.	Team SLR	Chevrolet	51.358	175.240
25	70	Johanna Long	ML Motorsports	Chevrolet	51.363	175.223
26	19	Mike Bliss	TriStar Motorsports	Toyota	51.400	175.097
27	74	Mike Harmon**	Harmon-Novak Racing	Dodge	51.433	174.985
28	14	Eric McClure	TriStar Motorsports	Toyota	51.435	174.978
29	2	Brian Scott	Richard Childress Racing	Chevrolet	51.450	174.927
30	23	Robert Richardson Jr. (i)**	R3 Motorsports	Chevrolet	51.630	174.317
31	79	Jeffrey Earnhardt (R)	Go Green Racing	Ford	51.632	174.311
32	44	Hal Martin (R)	TriStar Motorsports	Toyota	51.713	174.037
33	87	Joe Nemechek	NEMCO-Jay Robinson Racing	Toyota	51.719	174.017
34	24	Blake Koch**	SR² Motorsports	Toyota	51.911	173.374
35	00	Jason White	SR² Motorsports	Toyota	51.929	173.314
36	15	Juan Carlos Blum (R)	Rick Ware Racing	Ford	52.205	172.397
37	51	Jeremy Clements	Jeremy Clements Racing	Chevrolet	52.283	172.140
38	4	Danny Efland	JD Motorsports	Chevrolet	52.323	172.008
39	40	Reed Sorenson*	The Motorsports Group	Chevrolet	52.787	170.497
40	1	Kurt Busch (i)	Phoenix Racing	Chevrolet	51.435	174.978
Failed to qualify, withdrew, or driver changes
41	85	Bobby Gerhart	Gerhart Racing	Chevrolet	51.831	173.641
42	89	Morgan Shepherd	Shepherd Racing Ventures	Dodge	51.912	173.370
43	92	Dexter Stacey (R)	KH Motorsports	Ford	52.413	171.713
44	52	Joey Gase	Hamilton Means Racing	Toyota	52.963	169.930
WD	41	Donnie Neuenberger	Rick Ware Racing	Chevrolet	—	—
Official Starting grid

* – Made the field via owners points

** – Mike Harmon, Robert Richardson Jr., and Blake Koch all had to start at the rear of the field. Richardson and Harmon missed the drivers meeting and Koch had adjustments outside impound.

== Race ==
At the start, the pack began to form into tandems. Pole sitter Trevor Bayne led the first lap of the race with Parker Kligerman pushing him. On lap 4, Bayne and Kligerman got split up, allowing Tony Stewart to take the lead with Danica Patrick behind him. This tandem also separated, which let Kyle Busch take the lead with Matt Kenseth pushing him. Tony Stewart took the lead on lap 6 with Austin Dillon pushing him. On lap 7, Danica Patrick took the lead with Elliott Sadler pushing her. The first caution of the race flew when Scott Lagasse Jr. got turned by Trevor Bayne through the tri-oval near the start line. The right front splitter of his car dug into the grass; the damage was enough to force Lagasse to retire from the race. During the caution, most of the field came down to pit for fuel except for leader Danica Patrick. The race would restart on lap 12. On the restart, Elliott Sadler took the lead with a push from his teammate Brian Vickers. Vickers took the lead at lap 18. On lap 23, Sadler claimed the lead with a push from Kyle Busch. On lap 28, Brad Keselowski took the lead with a push from his teammate Sam Hornish Jr. On lap 30, Hornish took the lead, but would be passed three-wide by Trevor Bayne and Kyle Busch with Busch taking the lead with Dale Earnhardt Jr. On lap 31, Danica Patrick's engine failed, forcing her to retire. At the same time, the second caution occurred when Regan Smith got turned by Elliott Sadler in turn 4 and would save it not to spin back across the field. Fearing Smith would cross the track, rookie Juan Carlos Blum spun his car and hit the inside wall, ending his run. The race would restart on lap 36 with Kyle Busch leading and his teammate Matt Kenseth behind him. Kenseth passed Busch for the lead on lap 45. On lap 50, Justin Allgaier took the lead with Michael Annett. Kenseth would take it back the next lap after Allgaier and Annett got separated. On lap 58, Earnhardt Jr. took the lead with Kurt Busch pushing him after Kenseth and Kyle Busch switched positions. Kyle would take the lead on lap 60 when Earnhardt Jr. and Kurt got separated. On lap 63, Kasey Kahne took the lead with Regan Smith. On lap 64, the third caution would be called for a four-car crash in the tri-oval. Mike Wallace went downslope to go in front of Michael Annett, but turned across Annett's nose and turned down into Kurt Busch. Wallace also clipped Reed Sorenson, who spun up and collected Joe Nemechek in a chain reaction wreck, and the four spun through the infield grass. Only Kurt Busch would retire from the race following the crash.

=== Final laps ===
Dale Earnhardt Jr. won the race off of pit road and he led the field to the restart with 50 laps to go on lap 71. Earnhardt Jr. moved to the lead with a push from rookie Kyle Larson. With 49 to go, Regan Smith attempted to take the lead with a push from Kyle Busch. Smith beat Earnhardt Jr. to the line, and moved in front of Jr. and Larson the next lap after the both of them got separated. With 40 to go, Brad Keselowski took the lead with a push from Trevor Bayne, but they separated, and Smith immediately took the lead back. With 36 to go, the fourth caution arrived when smoke poured out of Trevor Bayne's car. Fortunately for Bayne and his team, his engine was fine, but his driveshaft had broken, sending the car to the garage. Bayne would return, but finished 19 laps down. Brad Keselowski won the race off of pit road and he led the field to the restart with 31 laps to go and rookie Alex Bowman behind him. With 30 laps to go, Matt Kenseth took the lead with a push from his teammate Kyle Busch. With 29 to go, Brian Scott attempted to take the lead with Sam Hornish Jr. and Scott led that lap and was able to get in front of Kenseth and Busch the next lap. With 27 to go, Kenseth took the lead back. Scott took it back the next lap. With 24 to go, Kyle Larson took the lead with push from Parker Kligerman. Scott took it back the next lap. With 22 to go, Larson took the lead back after Scott and Hornish swapped but both Larson and his partner Kligerman swapped which allowed Kasey Kahne to take the lead. But Kahne was far ahead of the pack by himself with no partner and Eric McClure took the lead with rookie Nelson Piquet Jr. pushing him and McClure led that lap. But Piquet picked up Brad Keselowski as his drafting partner which left McClure all alone with no drafting help and Parker Kligerman took the lead with Kyle Larson with 21 to go. At the same time down the backstretch, Kyle Busch's engine blew up and caught on fire ending his day and bringing out the 5th caution of the race for oil on the track. During the caution a few laps later, Reed Sorenson's engine also blew which extended the caution. The race would restart with 14 laps to go with Kligerman in the lead. On the restart, Eric McClure took the lead but got passed immeadietly by Kligerman and Larson down the backstretch as he and his partner Nelson Piquet Jr. did not had drafting help after the car behind Piquet in Joe Nemechek jumped to the outside. With 11 laps to go, Elliott Sadler took the lead with pushing from Michael Annett. With 9 to go, Regan Smith took the lead with pushing from Brad Keselowski. With 6 to go, Tony Stewart took the lead with pushing from Sam Hornish Jr. but Smith would lead the lap as he beat Stewart to the line.

With 5 to go, the 6th caution flew for the first big one of the race in turn 1. Michael Annett went up to follow Austin Dillon but Annett turned Dillon into Elliott Sadler and both Dillon and Annett spun up the track into the outside wall causing the outside to stack up. During the wreck, Dillon was riding on the outside wall and took a couple of hard shots in the door from Kasey Kahne and Jeffrey Earnhardt in the process. Michael Annett also pounded the outside wall head on at about 170 miles per hour. The hit was so hard that Annett ended up going to the hospital. He was released later that day after suffering a bruised sternum from the wreck and would miss the next 8 races. Annett was replaced by Aric Almirola for the next race at Phoenix and Reed Sorenson for the next 7 races until Annett returned for Charlotte. The wreck ended up collecting 13 cars. The cars involved were Elliott Sadler, Austin Dillon, Danny Efland, Kasey Kahne, Michael Annett, Hal Martin, Mike Bliss, Johanna Long, Jamie Dick, Jason White, Jeffrey Earnhardt, Matt Kenseth, and Joe Nemechek.

The wreck would set up a two lap sprint to the finish. On the restart, Tony Stewart took the lead with pushing from Sam Hornish Jr. On the last lap, Regan Smith took the lead with pushing from Brad Keselowski after Stewart and Hornish got separated. In turn 1, rookie Alex Bowman attempted to thread the needle in between Keselowski and Stewart as he got a massive push by Parker Kligerman but Keselowski just shut the door on them that almost spun Keselowski in the process and separated both of them as well. Stewart and Hornish were able to get back together and began to make ground on the Smith–Keselowski tandem. But both Stewart and Hornish weren't able to get close enough to make a challenge. Knowing this, Keselowski made an attempt for the win and got to Smith's outside going toward the tri-oval. Smith went to block but got turned by Keselowski into the outside wall ending his chances to win. Keselowski got hit in the rear by Hornish that turned Keselowski and caused a pile up that took out 14 cars and involved the whole pack except for Tony Stewart and Stewart won the race as the caution flew before he got there. During the wreck, Kyle Larson got hooked onto Keselowski's passenger door and this spun the both of them 90 degrees where Keselowski hit the outside wall drivers door first and Larson pointed towards the wall. At the same time, Larson got hit in the right rear by Brian Scott that lifted Larson's car off the ground and twirl in the air while he also got hit in the front while in the air by Justin Allgaier and Larson's car spun around and hit the crossover gate part of catch fence front first severing the whole front of the car including both wheels and the engine off while also destroying the whole crossover gate part of the fence and sending debris into the grand stands even toward the second level. Larson's impact was so fierce, the camera above the finish line started to shake. ESPN analyst Andy Petree even said the impact shook the booth where he was commentating the race for ESPN along with Allen Bestwick and Dale Jarrett. The engine and one of the wheels landed just short of the stands near the catch fencing. Larson got out uninjured as did the rest of the drivers. But there were multiple injuries in the grandstands from the wreck. A total of 28 people were injured with 2 in critical condition. But thankfully, there were no deaths. The wreck involved Regan Smith, Brad Keselowski, Sam Hornish Jr., Kyle Larson, Alex Bowman, Robert Richardson Jr., Dale Earnhardt Jr., Travis Pastrana, Parker Kligerman, Nelson Piquett Jr., Eric McClure, Brian Scott, Justin Allgaier, and Elliott Sadler. This was Stewart's 7th win at Daytona in the last 9 Nationwide Series openers tying him with Dale Earnhardt Jr. for most all time. Sam Hornish Jr., Alex Bowman, Dale Earnhardt Jr., and Parker Kligerman rounded out the top 5 while Brian Scott, Justin Allgaier, Eric McClure, Robert Richardson Jr., and Travis Pastrana rounded out the top 10.

In the aftermath of the incident, Daytona and Talladega Superspeedway added cables and tethers to the crossover gates, with Daytona's being installed in time for the Sprint Cup Series' Coke Zero 400 in July. The crash also resulted in a rule prohibiting teams from making consistent contact during drafting in turns ("locking bumpers") in turns at superspeedway circuits.

The picture of Larson's car getting shredded by the catch fence remains as one of the most well-known and reproduced images in the sport's history.

== Results ==
Pos	Grid	No.	Driver	Team	Manufacturer	Laps	Points
1	10	33	Tony Stewart	Richard Childress Racing	Chevrolet	120	0
2	2	12	Sam Hornish Jr.	Penske Racing	Ford	120	42
3	8	99	Alex Bowman #	RAB Racing	Toyota	120	41
4	13	88	Dale Earnhardt Jr.	JR Motorsports	Chevrolet	120	0
5	3	77	Parker Kligerman	Kyle Busch Motorsports	Toyota	120	40
6	29	2	Brian Scott	Richard Childress Racing	Chevrolet	120	39
7	14	31	Justin Allgaier	Turner Scott Motorsports	Chevrolet	120	38
8	28	14	Eric McClure	TriStar Motorsports	Toyota	120	37
9	30	23	Robert Richardson Jr.	R3 Motorsports	Chevrolet	120	0
10	4	60	Travis Pastrana	Roush Fenway Racing	Ford	120	34
11	17	30	Nelson Piquet Jr. #	Turner Scott Motorsports	Chevrolet	120	33
12	11	22	Brad Keselowski	Penske Racing	Ford	120	0
13	21	32	Kyle Larson #	Turner Scott Motorsports	Chevrolet	120	32
14	15	7	Regan Smith	JR Motorsports	Chevrolet	120	32
15	6	11	Elliott Sadler	Joe Gibbs Racing	Toyota	120	30
16	9	18	Matt Kenseth	Joe Gibbs Racing	Toyota	120	0
17	27	74	Mike Harmon	Mike Harmon Racing	Dodge	120	28
18	33	87	Joe Nemechek	NEMCO-Jay Robinson Racing	Toyota	120	26
19	20	20	Brian Vickers	Joe Gibbs Racing	Toyota	118	26
20	19	5	Kasey Kahne	JR Motorsports	Chevrolet	118	0
21	5	3	Austin Dillon	Richard Childress Racing	Chevrolet	117	23
22	31	79	Jeffrey Earnhardt #	Go Green Racing	Ford	116	23
23	26	19	Mike Bliss	TriStar Motorsports	Toyota	116	22
24	35	00	Jason White	SR² Motorsports	Toyota	116	20
25	38	4	Danny Efland	JD Motorsports	Chevrolet	116	20
26	22	43	Michael Annett	Richard Petty Motorsports	Ford	115	18
27	25	70	Johanna Long	ML Motorsports	Chevrolet	115	17
28	32	44	Hal Martin #	TriStar Motorsports	Toyota	115	16
29	18	55	Jamie Dick	VIVA Motorsports	Chevrolet	115	15
30	39	40	Reed Sorenson	The Motorsports Group	Chevrolet	102	14
31	1	6	Trevor Bayne	Roush Fenway Racing	Ford	101	14
32	7	54	Kyle Busch	Joe Gibbs Racing	Toyota	98	0
33	37	51	Jeremy Clements	Jeremy Clements Racing	Chevrolet	88	11
34	23	01	Mike Wallace	JD Motorsports	Chevrolet	87	10
35	40	1	Kurt Busch	Phoenix Racing	Chevrolet	65	0
36	12	34	Danica Patrick	Turner Scott Motorsports	Chevrolet	31	0
37	36	15	Juan Carlos Blum #	Rick Ware Racing	Ford	30	7
38	34	24	Blake Koch	SR² Motorsports	Toyota	14	6
39	24	8	Scott Lagasse Jr.	Team SLR	Chevrolet	7	5
40	16	10	Jeff Green	TriStar Motorsports	Toyota	4	4
# Rookie of the Year candidate Source:

== Standings after the race ==
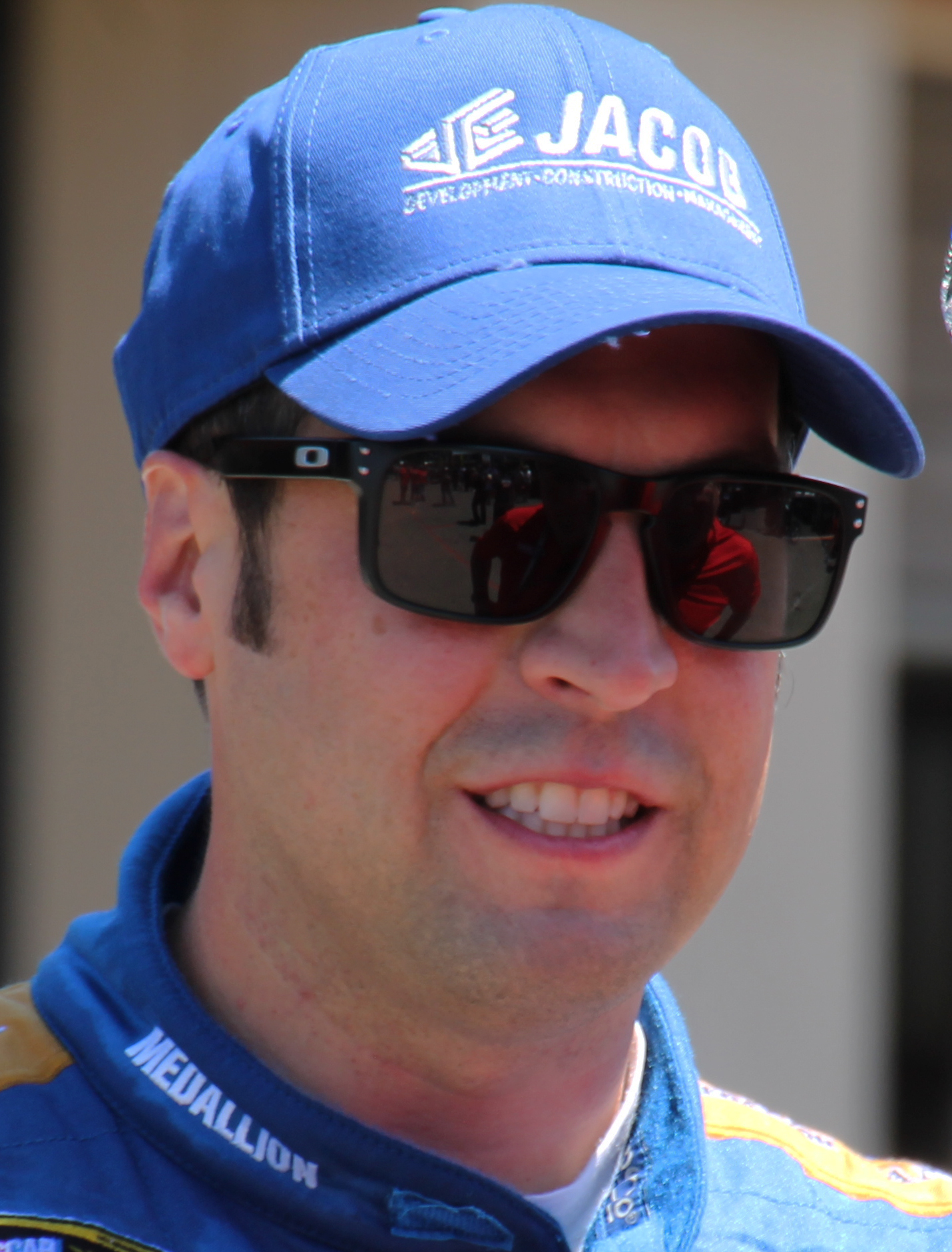
Being the highest finishing Nationwide points finisher in the race, Sam Hornish Jr. started the season with the points lead.

Pos	Driver	Points
1	Sam Hornish Jr.	42
2	Alex Bowman	41
3	Parker Kligerman	40
4	Brian Scott	39
5	Justin Allgaier	38
6	Eric McClure	37
7	Travis Pastrana	34
8	Nelson Piquet Jr.	33
9	Kyle Larson	32
10	Regan Smith	32

Previous race: 2012 Ford EcoBoost 300 (Miami)	NASCAR Nationwide Series; 2013 season	Next race: 2013 Dollar General 200
