= Johanna Robbins =

American racing driver (born 1992)

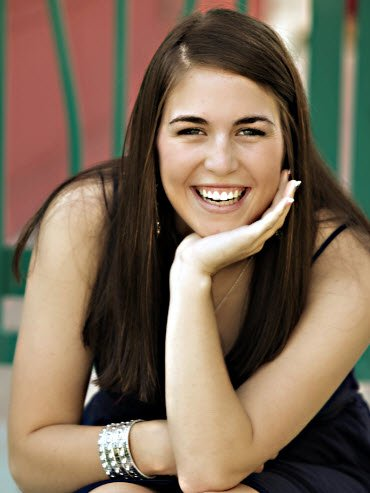
- Born: Johanna Long; May 26, 1992 (age 34); Pensacola, Florida, U.S.
- Achievements: 2009 Sunoco Gulf Coast Championship Series Champion; 2010 Snowball Derby Winner; 2008 Lee Fields Memorial Winner
- Awards: 2009 Sunoco Gulf Coast Championship Series Rookie of the Year

NASCAR O'Reilly Auto Parts Series career
- 42 races run over 3 years
- 2015 position: 72nd
- Best finish: 20th (2012)
- First race: 2012 DRIVE4COPD 300 (Daytona)
- Last race: 2015 U.S. Cellular 250 (Iowa)
Wins	Top tens	Poles
0	0	0

NASCAR FedEx Freight Truck Series career
- 24 races run over 2 years
- Best finish: 21st (2011)
- First race: 2010 AAA Insurance 200 (IRP)
- Last race: 2011 WinStar World Casino 350K (Texas)
Wins	Top tens	Poles
0	0	0
- Statistics up to date as of August 30, 2024.

Johanna Robbins (née Long; born May 26, 1992) is an American professional stock car racing driver. She last competed part-time in Asphalt Super Late Model competition in 2023 in the No. 10 Toyota Camry for Jett Motorsports.

== Racing career ==
=== Background ===
Long's father raced late models and she wanted to start racing karts when she was five years old; he allowed her to start racing when she was eight. She moved up into legends car racing, before turning to late models when she was twelve. In 2008, she won the Gulf Coast championship including races at Pensacola and Mobile, Alabama as well as the late model track championship at Five Flags Speedway in Pensacola.

=== NASCAR career ===
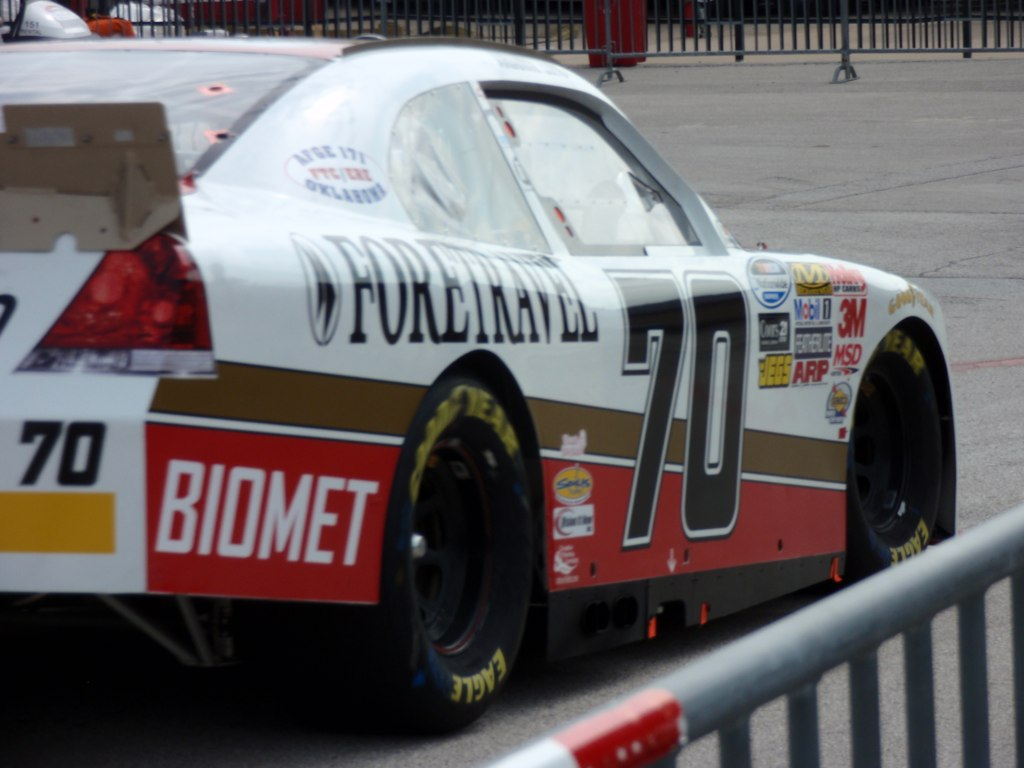
Long's 2012 Nationwide Series car

Long began her transition into NASCAR in 2009 by racing in a variety of series, including ASA Late Model Series, Pro Late Model, and ARCA. In 38 events, she had 27 top-ten finishes, 17 top-fives and five wins. Long ended 2009 by winning the pole position in the Snowball Derby, one of the few late model races in the off-season, which features drivers from around the United States.

Long was expected to race in three Camping World races in 2010 but ended up racing in seven events. She raced in the Billy Ballew Motorsports truck in the middle of the season before the No. 15 team was shut down, and finished the year by racing in four events for her family-owned team, Panhandle Motorsports. With Ballew she qualified in all three races between 15th and 20th before finishing 17th, 34th and 20th. With Panhandle she had a season-high ninth place qualifying effort at Texas Motor Speedway with her best finish being a 20th-place result at the final race at Homestead-Miami Speedway. Long returned to Pensacola's Five Flags Speedway for the 2010 Snowball Derby, and won the 43rd annual running of the event by holding off Landon Cassill. She became the second woman to win the race after Tammy Jo Kirk did it in 1994.

Long competed in the Camping World Truck Series in 2011, driving the family-owned No. 20 Toyota and running for Rookie-of-the-Year honors. Sponsorship issues forced her to run a partial season; her best finish was eleventh at Texas Motor Speedway.

For 2012, Long signed to drive the No. 70 Biomet/Foretravel Motorcoach Chevrolet, owned by ML Motorsports, in the NASCAR Nationwide Series, with former series champion David Green acting as a mentor. She finished 21st in her Nationwide Series debut at Daytona International Speedway, becoming the youngest woman driver ever to compete in the series. The team entered 21 races, finishing 20th in the standings. In 2013, still running a limited schedule, she fell to 23rd in points, and the team let her contract expire at the end of the season, soon folding.

Long spent the 2014 season racing Pro Late Models at Five Flags Speedway while searching for sponsorship.

On January 28, 2015, it was announced that Long would drive the No. 03 Chevrolet Camaro for Mike Affarano in the Xfinity Series. However, after several weeks of funding issues and her one and only attempt with the team resulted in a DNQ at Richmond, the team revealed on May 21 that Long has been released. On July 30, she joined Obaika Racing for the Xfinity race at Iowa Speedway.

== Personal life ==
In 2016, Long married Kyle Busch Motorsports engineer and fellow short track driver Hunter Robbins. They have two children; Rory and Rhett.

== Motorsports career results ==
=== NASCAR ===
(key) (Bold – Pole position awarded by qualifying time. Italics – Pole position earned by points standings or practice time. * – Most laps led.)

==== Xfinity Series ====
NASCAR Xfinity Series results
Year	Team	No.	Make	1	2	3	4	5	6	7	8	9	10	11	12	13	14	15	16	17	18	19	20	21	22	23	24	25	26	27	28	29	30	31	32	33	NXSC	Pts	Ref
2012	ML Motorsports	70	Chevy	DAY; 21	PHO	LVS; 19	BRI; 29	CAL	TEX; 20	RCH; 20	TAL; 37	DAR	IOW; 22	CLT; 22	DOV	MCH; 16	ROA	KEN; 19	DAY; 12	NHA	CHI; 21	IND; 30	IOW; 13	GLN	CGV	BRI; 29	ATL	RCH; 32	CHI; 21	KEN; 12	DOV	CLT	KAN; 31	TEX; 36	PHO	HOM; 34	20th	428	
2013	ML Motorsports	70	Chevy	DAY; 27	PHO; 40	LVS; 19	BRI	CAL	TEX; 27	RCH; 15	TAL; 26	DAR	CLT; 36	DOV	IOW; 12	MCH; 18	ROA	KEN; 20	DAY	NHA	CHI; 20	IND; 27	IOW; 19	GLN	MOH	BRI	ATL	RCH; 19	CHI; 26	KEN; 16	DOV	KAN; 24	CLT; 17	TEX; 37	PHO	HOM; 21	23rd	414	
2015	Mike Affarano Motorsports	03	Chevy	DAY	ATL	LVS	PHO	CAL	TEX	BRI	RCH; DNQ	TAL	IOW	CLT	DOV	MCH	CHI	DAY	KEN	NHA	IND																72nd	17	
2015	Obaika Racing	97	Chevy																			IOW; 27	GLN	MOH	BRI	ROA	DAR	RCH	CHI	KEN	DOV	CLT	KAN	TEX	PHO	HOM	72nd	17	

==== Camping World Truck Series ====
NASCAR Camping World Truck Series results
Year	Team	No.	Make	1	2	3	4	5	6	7	8	9	10	11	12	13	14	15	16	17	18	19	20	21	22	23	24	25	NCWTC	Pts	Ref
2010	Billy Ballew Motorsports	15	Toyota	DAY	ATL	MAR	NSH	KAN	DOV	CLT	TEX	MCH	IOW	GTY	IRP; 17	POC	NSH; 34	DAR	BRI	CHI; 20	KEN	NHA							47th	586	
2010	Panhandle Motorsports	20	Toyota																				LVS; 36	MAR; 22	TAL	TEX; 36	PHO	HOM; 20	47th	586	
2011	Panhandle Motorsports	20	Toyota	DAY; 32	PHO; 20	DAR; 31	MAR; 18	NSH; 32	DOV; 22	CLT; 20	KAN; 24	TEX; 11	KEN; 36	IOW; Wth	NSH; 26	IRP; 17	POC	MCH	BRI; 15	ATL; 31	CHI	NHA	KEN	LVS	TAL; 16	MAR; 33	TEX; 18	HOM	21st	347	

^{*} Season still in progress
^{1} not eligible for series points

=== ARCA Re/Max Series ===
(key) (Bold – Pole position awarded by qualifying time. Italics – Pole position earned by points standings or practice time. * – Most laps led.)

ARCA Re/Max Series results
Year	Team	No.	Make	1	2	3	4	5	6	7	8	9	10	11	12	13	14	15	16	17	18	19	20	21	ARSC	Pts	Ref
2009	Venturini Motorsports	25	Chevy	DAY	SLM	CAR	TAL	KEN	TOL	POC	MCH	MFD	IOW; 23	KEN	BLN	POC	ISF	CHI	TOL	DSF	NJE	SLM	KAN		65th	450	
2009	D'Hondt Motorsports	19	Toyota																					CAR; 29	65th	450	

Sporting positions
Preceded by Inaugural	Sunoco Gulf Coast Championship Series Champion; 2009	Succeeded by Chase Elliott
Achievements
Preceded by Kyle Busch	Snowball Derby Winner; 2010	Succeeded by Chase Elliott
