= ML Motorsports =

Former NASCAR team

- Owner(s): Mary Louise Miller; Stephanie Mullen
- Base: Warsaw, Indiana
- Series: Nationwide Series
- Manufacturer: Chevrolet
- Opened: 1999
- Closed: 2013

Career
- Debut: 2006 Circuit City 250
- Latest race: Nationwide Series: 2013 Ford EcoBoost 200 (Homestead)
- Races competed: 141
- Drivers' Championships: 0
- Race victories: 0
- Pole positions: 0

ML Motorsports was an American professional stock car racing team that last competed in the NASCAR Nationwide Series. It was owned jointly by Mary Louise Miller and her daughter, Stephanie Mullen, making it the first confirmed NASCAR team to be owned jointly by a mother and daughter team. The team fielded the No. 70 Chevrolet from 2006 to 2013.

== ARCA Series ==
=== Car No. 67 History ===
ML Motorsports debuted in 1999 in the ARCA Bondo/Mar-Hyde Series. It fielded the No. 67 Biomet/EBI Sports Medicine Chevy at the season-opening First Plus Financial 200 for Jimmy Kitchens, who finished 12th. Kitchens ran another race for the team at Atlanta, before leaving the team to concentrate on his Busch Series ride with Carroll Racing. He was replaced for the next three races by Andy Hillenburg, who registered a best finish of 8th at Salem Speedway. Kitchens returned to the team at this time and drove the next six races, his best finish coming at Pocono, where he finished sixth. After taking the next several races off, ML Racing returned to run the final four races of the season with Brian Ross and had a career-best finish of fourth at the season finale at Atlanta. Ross joined the team for a full season in 2000. With sponsorship from Biomet, Damon RV, Invisible Glass, and Stoner Care Car Products, Ross won two poles, had nine top-fives (including two second-place finishes) and was named Rookie of the Year.

In 2001, Ross left the series and was replaced by Jason Jarrett. He won at Kansas Speedway and finished second in the points, winning Rookie of the Year honors. He had fourteen top-tens in 2002, and sixteen in 2003, and did not finish worse than third in points in either of those years, but went winless during both seasons. ML got new sponsorship from Bennigan's and Gladiator GarageWorks in 2004, in which Jarrett won his second and final race at Salem. He was replaced by Chad Blount in 2005 and Foretravel Motorcoach became the team's new sponsor. Blount won four times before the team suspended operations for the rest of the season to focus on building its Busch Series operation. It returned to the series briefly to run five races in 2005 with Justin Diercks driving. They only finished one race, a fifteenth-place finish at Kentucky Speedway.

=== Car No. 97 History ===
ML Motorsports ran a second team part-time beginnining in 2001. Dennis English debuted the No. 33 car at Chicagoland Speedway, finishing 33rd after an early oil leak. A few races later, Kevin Belmont ran the No. 51 at Toledo Speedway, but finished 29th after transmission failure.

In 2002, the team ran the No. 75 and No. 97 entries driven by Red Farmer in a partnership with Bob Schacht. Farmer earned two top-ten finishes in five races, his best finish being a 4th at the DuQuoin State Fairgrounds.

== Nationwide Series ==
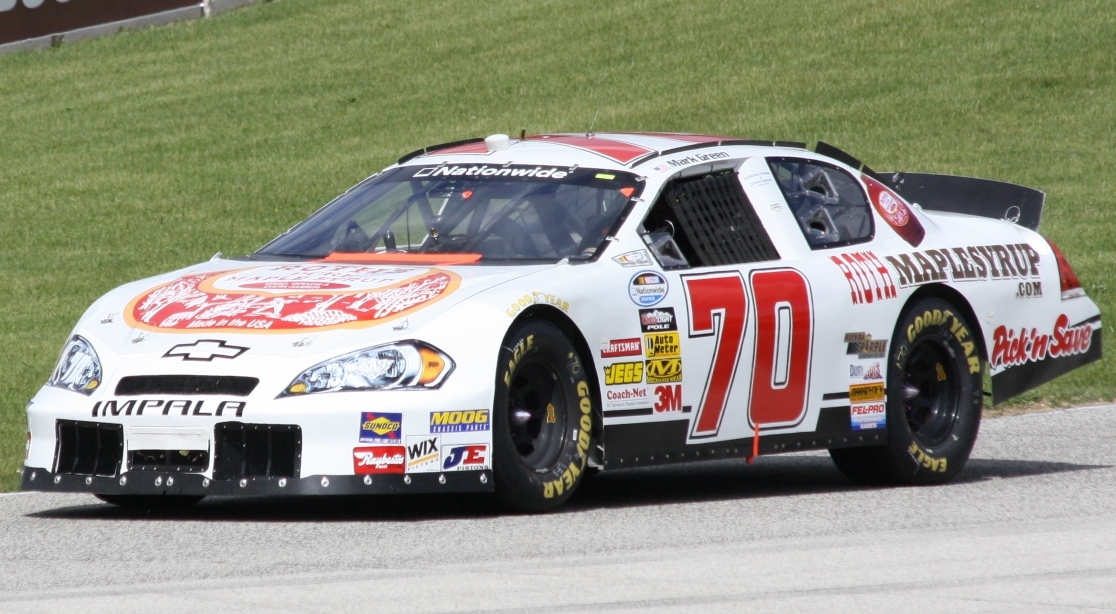
Mark Green driving the No. 70 in 2010.

ML Motorsports made its NASCAR debut at 2006 at Richmond International Raceway with Diercks driving and Foretravel sponsoring. They qualified twenty-eighth but finished last after a wreck. They ran six more races that season with a best finish of twenty-eighth at Gateway International Raceway. The combo returned in 2007 for seven additional races, with two twenty-fourth-place finishes. Diercks was fired from the team and replaced by Mark Green, who ran ten races and had a best finish of nineteenth. In 2008, Green and the team attempted twenty-one races, qualifying for nineteenth, and had its first top-five finish at Talladega Superspeedway, where Green finished fifth. The next season, Green was released after four races, and Shelby Howard took over as driver. In seventeen starts, Howard finished in the top-twenty seven times.

Howard returned in 2010 and had a best finish of twelfth twice in twenty-one starts. That year, ML formed a partnership with Jay Robinson Racing to allow Robinson to enter its No. 49 car using ML's number and owner points during races ML would not enter. This allowed ML to remain eligible for the top-30 exemption in owner points, so that it would not fail to qualify for any races that it attempted. Green would run the races that JRR fielded, earning a best finish of nineteenth. This arrangement continued in 2011 with Dennis Setzer driving in the JRR/ML races. Howard began 2011 as driver, but was replaced by both David Stremme and Scott Wimmer on a rotating basis. Stremme got the team's best finish of the season at Richmond when he finished ninth.

In 2012, rookie Johanna Long became the team's primary driver. During the races ML didn't enter, the 70 was independently run by NEMCO-Jay Robinson Racing with Tony Raines, Charles Lewandoski, Derrike Cope, and David Green sharing driving duties. The team primarily ran Toyotas in those events.

Johanna Long drove the car again in 2013 but the team closed its doors in January 2014. The team finished most of the races ran, but never had the sponsorship or resources to run a full schedule. All assets of the team were sold to Derrike Cope and his team Derrike Cope Racing.

=== Car No. 70 results ===
Year	Driver	No.	Make	1	2	3	4	5	6	7	8	9	10	11	12	13	14	15	16	17	18	19	20	21	22	23	24	25	26	27	28	29	30	31	32	33	34	35	Owners	Pts
2005	Chad Blount	70	Chevy	DAY	CAL	MXC	LVS	ATL	NSH	BRI	TEX	PHO	TAL	DAR	RCH	CLT	DOV	NSH	KEN	MLW	DAY	CHI	NHA	PPR	GTY	IRP	GLN	MCH	BRI	CAL	RCH	DOV	KAN; DNQ	CLT	MEM	TEX; DNQ	PHO	HOM		
2006	Justin Diercks	70	Chevy	DAY	CAL	MXC	LVS	ATL	BRI	TEX	NSH	PHO	TAL	RCH; 43	DAR	CLT	DOV	NSH; 32	KEN; 33	MLW	DAY	CHI; DNQ	NHA	MAR	GTY; 28	IRP; 31	GLN	MCH	BRI	CAL	RCH; DNQ	DOV	KAN; 32	CLT	MEM; 30	TEX; DNQ	PHO	HOM; DNQ		
2007	Justin Diercks	70	Chevy	DAY; DNQ	CAL	MXC	LVS; 22	ATL	BRI	NSH; 24	TEX; 24	PHO	TAL; 40	RCH; 28	DAR	CLT	DOV	NSH; 43	KEN; 31																					
2007	Mark Green	70	Chevy																	MLW; 21	NHA	DAY; 32	CHI; 30	GTY; 19	IRP	CGV	GLN	MCH; 39	BRI; 25	CAL	RCH; 28	DOV	KAN; 24	CLT	MEM	TEX; 36	PHO	HOM; 30		
2008	Mark Green	70	Chevy	DAY; 41	CAL	LVS	ATL	BRI; 24	NSH; 26	TEX; 28	PHO	MXC	TAL; 5	RCH; 22	DAR	CLT	DOV	NSH; 14	KEN; 22	MLW; 13	NHA	DAY; 30	CHI; 22	GTY; 14	IRP; 21	CGV	GLN	MCH; 23	BRI; 24	CAL	RCH; 22	DOV	KAN; 22	CLT; DNQ	MEM; 30	TEX; 20	PHO	HOM; DNQ		
2009	Mark Green	70	Chevy	DAY; 18	CAL	LVS	BRI; DNQ																																	
2009	Shelby Howard	70	Chevy					TEX; 32	NSH; 14	PHO	TAL; 27	RCH; 13	DAR	CLT	DOV	NSH; 12	KEN; 26	MLW; 23	NHA	DAY	CHI; 26	GTY; 13	IRP; 19	IOW; DNQ	GLN	MCH; 18	BRI; DNQ	CGV	ATL; 21	RCH; 35	DOV	KAN; 26	CAL	CLT	MEM; 12	TEX; 31	PHO	HOM; 33		
2010	Shelby Howard	70	Chevy	DAY; DNQ	CAL	LVS; 20	BRI; 34	NSH; 16	PHO	TEX; 25	TAL; 19	RCH; 30	DAR	DOV	CLT	NSH; 22	KEN; 17	ROA	NHA	DAY; 26	CHI; 20	GTY; 12	IRP; 14	IOW; 12	GLN	MCH; 23	BRI; 24	CGV	ATL	RCH; 24	DOV	KAN; 20	CAL	CLT; 39	GTY; 27	TEX; 28	PHO	HOM; 36		
2011	Shelby Howard	70	Chevy	DAY; 22	PHO; 28	LVS; 29	BRI; 27	CAL	TEX; 30	TAL																														
2011	David Stremme	70	Chevy								NSH; 20	RCH; 9	DAR	DOV				MCH; 12	ROA	DAY	KEN; 23	NHA	NSH; 16	IRP; 13				BRI; 17	ATL	RCH; 13	CHI; 26	DOV	KAN; 14	CLT	TEX; 34	PHO; 11	HOM; 15			
2011	Scott Wimmer	70	Chevy												IOW; 15	CLT	CHI; 19								IOW; 15	GLN	CGV													
2012	Johanna Long	70	Chevy	DAY; 21	PHO	LVS; 19	BRI; 29	CAL	TEX; 20	RCH; 20	TAL; 37	DAR	IOW; 22	CLT; 22	DOV	MCH; 16	ROA	KEN; 19	DAY; 12	NHA	CHI; 21	IND; 30	IOW; 13	GLN	CGV	BRI; 29	ATL	RCH; 32	CHI; 21	KEN; 12	DOV	CLT	KAN; 31	TEX; 36	PHO	HOM; 34				
2013	Johanna Long	70	Chevy	DAY; 27	PHO; 40	LVS; 19	BRI	CAL	TEX; 27	RCH; 15	TAL; 26	DAR	CLT; 36	DOV	IOW; 12	MCH; 18	ROA	KEN; 20	DAY	NHA	CHI; 20	IND; 27	IOW; 19	GLN	MOH	BRI	ATL	RCH; 19	CHI; 26	KEN; 16	DOV	KAN; 24	CLT; 17	TEX; 37	PHO	HOM; 21				
