= 2013 Jeff Foxworthy's Grit Chips 300 =

Fourth race of the 2013 NASCAR Nationwide Series

Race details
- Race 4 of 33 of the 2013 NASCAR Nationwide Series
- Date: March 16, 2013
- Official name: 31st Annual Jeff Foxworthy's Grit Chips 300
- Location: Bristol, Tennessee, Bristol Motor Speedway
- Course: Permanent racing facility
- Course length: 0.533 miles (0.858 km)
- Distance: 300 laps, 159.9 mi (257.334 km)
- Scheduled distance: 300 laps, 159.9 mi (257.334 km)
- Average speed: 81.872 miles per hour (131.760 km/h)

Pole position
Driver	Justin Allgaier	Turner Scott Motorsports
- Time: 15.380

Most laps led
Driver	Kyle Busch	Joe Gibbs Racing
- Laps: 156

Winner
No. 54	Kyle Busch	Joe Gibbs Racing

Television in the United States
- Network: ESPN
- Announcers: Allen Bestwick, Dale Jarrett, Andy Petree

Radio in the United States
- Radio: Performance Racing Network

The 2013 Jeff Foxworthy's Grit Chips 300 was the fourth stock car race of the 2013 NASCAR Nationwide Series and the 31st iteration of the event. The race was held on Saturday, March 16, in Bristol, Tennessee, at Bristol Motor Speedway, a 0.533 miles (0.858 km) permanent oval-shaped racetrack. The race took the scheduled 300 laps to complete. In a wild finish, Joe Gibbs Racing driver Kyle Busch would defend eventual second-place Turner Scott Motorsports driver Kyle Larson in one of closest NASCAR Nationwide Series finishes to date, by 0.023 seconds. The win was Busch's 53rd career NASCAR Nationwide Series win and his second of the season. To fill out the podium, Brian Vickers of Joe Gibbs Racing finished third.

== Background ==
The layout of Bristol Motor Speedway, the venue where the race was held.

The Bristol Motor Speedway, formerly known as Bristol International Raceway and Bristol Raceway, is a NASCAR short track venue located in Bristol, Tennessee. Constructed in 1960, it held its first NASCAR race on July 30, 1961. Despite its short length, Bristol is among the most popular tracks on the NASCAR schedule because of its distinct features, which include extraordinarily steep banking, an all concrete surface, two pit roads, and stadium-like seating. It has also been named one of the loudest NASCAR tracks.

=== Entry list ===
#	Driver	Team	Make	Sponsor
00	Jason White	SR² Motorsports	Toyota	Headrush
01	Mike Wallace	JD Motorsports	Chevrolet	Calhoun's
2	Brian Scott	Richard Childress Racing	Chevrolet	Shore Lodge
3	Austin Dillon	Richard Childress Racing	Chevrolet	AdvoCare
4	Danny Efland	JD Motorsports	Chevrolet	Flex Seal
5	Brad Sweet	JR Motorsports	Chevrolet	Great Clips
6	Trevor Bayne	Roush Fenway Racing	Ford	Ford EcoBoost
7	Regan Smith	JR Motorsports	Chevrolet	TaxSlayer
10	Jeff Green	TriStar Motorsports	Toyota	TriStar Motorsports
11	Elliott Sadler	Joe Gibbs Racing	Toyota	OneMain Financial
12	Sam Hornish Jr.	Penske Racing	Ford	Alliance Truck Parts
14	Eric McClure	TriStar Motorsports	Toyota	Hefty, Reynolds Wrap
15	Juan Carlos Blum	Rick Ware Racing	Ford	Western Banking Corporation
16	Chris Buescher	Roush Fenway Racing	Ford	Ford EcoBoost
19	Mike Bliss	TriStar Motorsports	Toyota	TriStar Motorsports
20	Brian Vickers	Joe Gibbs Racing	Toyota	Dollar General
22	Brad Keselowski	Penske Racing	Ford	Discount Tire, SKF
23	Robert Richardson Jr.	R3 Motorsports	Chevrolet	R3 Motorsports
24	Blake Koch	SR² Motorsports	Toyota	SupportMilitary.org, VeteransLodge.com
25	John Wes Townley	Venturini Motorsports	Toyota	Zaxby's
27	Michael McDowell	SR² Motorsports	Toyota	#teamBOOM!
30	Nelson Piquet Jr.	Turner Scott Motorsports	Chevrolet	Worx Yard Tools
31	Justin Allgaier	Turner Scott Motorsports	Chevrolet	Brandt Professional Agriculture
32	Kyle Larson	Turner Scott Motorsports	Chevrolet	Cottonelle
33	Kevin Harvick	Richard Childress Racing	Chevrolet	Hungryman, Armour Vienna Sausage
40	Josh Wise	The Motorsports Group	Chevrolet	The Motorsports Group
42	J. J. Yeley	The Motorsports Group	Chevrolet	The Motorsports Group
43	Reed Sorenson	Richard Petty Motorsports	Ford	Pilot Flying J
44	Hal Martin	TriStar Motorsports	Toyota	American Custom Yachts
46	Chase Miller	The Motorsports Group	Chevrolet	The Motorsports Group
51	Jeremy Clements	Jeremy Clements Racing	Chevrolet	RepairableVehicles.com, St. Jude's
52	Joey Gase	Jimmy Means Racing	Chevrolet	Donate Life
54	Kyle Busch	Joe Gibbs Racing	Toyota	Monster Energy
55	Jamie Dick	Viva Motorsports	Chevrolet	Viva Motorsports
60	Travis Pastrana	Roush Fenway Racing	Ford	Roush Fenway Racing
70	Brad Teague	ML Motorsports	Toyota	JD Metals, SCAG Power Equipment
74	Mike Harmon	Mike Harmon Racing	Chevrolet	JD Squared
77	Parker Kligerman	Kyle Busch Motorsports	Toyota	Bandit Chippers, Toyota
79	Jeffrey Earnhardt	Go Green Racing	Ford	Uponor Plumbing Systems
86	Kevin Lepage*	Deware Racing Group	Ford	Qello
87	Joe Nemechek	NEMCO Motorsports	Toyota	Maddie's Place Rocks
89	Morgan Shepherd	Shepherd Racing Ventures	Chevrolet	Racing with Jesus
92	Dexter Stacey	KH Motorsports	Ford	Maddie's Place Rocks
99	Alex Bowman	RAB Racing	Toyota	St. Jude Children's Research Hospital
Official entry list

== Practice ==
=== First practice ===
The first practice session was held on Friday, March 15, at 10:30 AM EST, and would last for an hour and 20 minutes. Austin Dillon of Richard Childress Racing would set the fastest time in the session, with a lap of 15.451 and an average speed of 124.186 miles per hour (199.858 km/h).

Pos.	#	Driver	Team	Make	Time	Speed
1	3	Austin Dillon	Richard Childress Racing	Chevrolet	15.451	124.186
2	99	Alex Bowman	RAB Racing	Toyota	15.495	123.833
3	7	Regan Smith	JR Motorsports	Chevrolet	15.579	123.166
Full first practice results

=== Second and final practice ===
The second and final practice session, sometimes referred to as Happy Hour, was held on Friday, March 15, at 2:00 PM EST, and would last for an hour and 30 minutes. Kevin Harvick of Richard Childress Racing would set the fastest time in the session, with a lap of 15.488 and an average speed of 123.889 miles per hour (199.380 km/h).

Pos.	#	Driver	Team	Make	Time	Speed
1	33	Kevin Harvick	Richard Childress Racing	Chevrolet	15.488	123.889
2	31	Justin Allgaier	Turner Scott Motorsports	Chevrolet	15.505	123.754
3	6	Trevor Bayne	Roush Fenway Racing	Ford	15.515	123.674
Full Happy Hour practice results

== Qualifying ==
Qualifying was held on Saturday, March 16, at 10:35 AM EST. Each driver would have two laps to set a fastest time; the fastest of the two would count as their official qualifying lap.

Justin Allgaier of Turner Scott Motorsports would win the pole, setting a time of 15.380 and an average speed of 124.759 miles per hour (200.780 km/h).

Three drivers would fail to qualify: Morgan Shepherd, Danny Efland, and Joey Gase, who withdrew after crashing in practice.

=== Full qualifying results ===
Pos.	#	Driver	Team	Make	Time	Speed
1	31	Justin Allgaier	Turner Scott Motorsports	Chevrolet	15.380	124.759
2	3	Austin Dillon	Richard Childress Racing	Chevrolet	15.425	124.395
3	12	Sam Hornish Jr.	Penske Racing	Ford	15.432	124.339
4	7	Regan Smith	JR Motorsports	Chevrolet	15.434	124.323
5	11	Elliott Sadler	Joe Gibbs Racing	Toyota	15.469	124.042
6	22	Brad Keselowski	Penske Racing	Ford	15.470	124.034
7	33	Kevin Harvick	Richard Childress Racing	Chevrolet	15.477	123.978
8	2	Brian Scott	Richard Childress Racing	Chevrolet	15.492	123.857
9	19	Mike Bliss	TriStar Motorsports	Toyota	15.510	123.714
10	6	Trevor Bayne	Roush Fenway Racing	Ford	15.527	123.578
11	16	Chris Buescher	Roush Fenway Racing	Ford	15.533	123.531
12	32	Kyle Larson	Turner Scott Motorsports	Chevrolet	15.566	123.269
13	54	Kyle Busch	Joe Gibbs Racing	Toyota	15.569	123.245
14	20	Brian Vickers	Joe Gibbs Racing	Toyota	15.605	122.961
15	99	Alex Bowman	RAB Racing	Toyota	15.622	122.827
16	77	Parker Kligerman	Kyle Busch Motorsports	Toyota	15.627	122.787
17	43	Reed Sorenson	Richard Petty Motorsports	Ford	15.638	122.701
18	60	Travis Pastrana	Roush Fenway Racing	Ford	15.738	121.921
19	30	Nelson Piquet Jr.	Turner Scott Motorsports	Chevrolet	15.739	121.914
20	87	Joe Nemechek	NEMCO Motorsports	Toyota	15.771	121.666
21	42	J. J. Yeley	The Motorsports Group	Chevrolet	15.775	121.635
22	51	Jeremy Clements	Jeremy Clements Racing	Chevrolet	15.819	121.297
23	46	Chase Miller	The Motorsports Group	Chevrolet	15.862	120.968
24	14	Eric McClure	TriStar Motorsports	Toyota	15.877	120.854
25	44	Hal Martin	TriStar Motorsports	Toyota	15.890	120.755
26	40	Josh Wise	The Motorsports Group	Chevrolet	15.891	120.748
27	5	Brad Sweet	JR Motorsports	Chevrolet	15.960	120.226
28	10	Jeff Green	TriStar Motorsports	Toyota	15.960	120.226
29	15	Scott Riggs	Rick Ware Racing	Ford	16.005	119.888
30	79	Jeffrey Earnhardt	Go Green Racing	Ford	16.036	119.656
31	92	Dexter Stacey	KH Motorsports	Ford	16.044	119.596
32	55	Jamie Dick	Viva Motorsports	Chevrolet	16.050	119.551
33	01	Mike Wallace	JD Motorsports	Chevrolet	16.125	118.995
34	25	John Wes Townley	Venturini Motorsports	Toyota	16.149	118.819
35	00	Jason White	SR² Motorsports	Toyota	16.240	118.153
36	74	Mike Harmon	Mike Harmon Racing	Chevrolet	16.481	116.425
Qualified by owner's points
37	23	Robert Richardson Jr.	R3 Motorsports	Chevrolet	17.035	112.639
38	70	Brad Teague	ML Motorsports	Toyota	17.518	109.533
39	24	Blake Koch	SR² Motorsports	Toyota	20.540	93.418
Last car to qualify on time
40	27	Michael McDowell	SR² Motorsports	Toyota	16.161	118.730
Failed to qualify or withdrew
41	89	Morgan Shepherd	Shepherd Racing Ventures	Chevrolet	16.533	116.059
42	4	Danny Efland	JD Motorsports	Chevrolet	16.555	115.905
43	52	Joey Gase	Jimmy Means Racing	Chevrolet	—	—
WD	86	Kevin Lepage	Deware Racing Group	Ford	—	—
Official starting lineup

== Race results ==
Fin	St	#	Driver	Team	Make	Laps	Led	Status	Pts	Winnings
1	13	54	Kyle Busch	Joe Gibbs Racing	Toyota	300	156	running	0	$51,450
2	12	32	Kyle Larson	Turner Scott Motorsports	Chevrolet	300	0	running	42	$46,634
3	14	20	Brian Vickers	Joe Gibbs Racing	Toyota	300	0	running	41	$28,800
4	3	12	Sam Hornish Jr.	Penske Racing	Ford	300	0	running	40	$32,416
5	7	33	Kevin Harvick	Richard Childress Racing	Chevrolet	300	43	running	0	$25,575
6	4	7	Regan Smith	JR Motorsports	Chevrolet	300	0	running	38	$21,900
7	11	16	Chris Buescher	Roush Fenway Racing	Ford	300	0	running	37	$21,535
8	1	31	Justin Allgaier	Turner Scott Motorsports	Chevrolet	300	62	running	37	$31,461
9	16	77	Parker Kligerman	Kyle Busch Motorsports	Toyota	300	0	running	35	$27,841
10	8	2	Brian Scott	Richard Childress Racing	Chevrolet	300	0	running	34	$28,766
11	2	3	Austin Dillon	Richard Childress Racing	Chevrolet	300	0	running	33	$27,291
12	10	6	Trevor Bayne	Roush Fenway Racing	Ford	300	13	running	33	$27,191
13	9	19	Mike Bliss	TriStar Motorsports	Toyota	300	0	running	31	$7,091
14	15	99	Alex Bowman	RAB Racing	Toyota	300	0	running	30	$27,041
15	6	22	Brad Keselowski	Penske Racing	Ford	299	26	running	0	$20,850
16	18	60	Travis Pastrana	Roush Fenway Racing	Ford	299	0	running	28	$27,541
17	34	25	John Wes Townley	Venturini Motorsports	Toyota	299	0	running	0	$20,200
18	17	43	Reed Sorenson	Richard Petty Motorsports	Ford	299	0	running	26	$26,816
19	26	40	Josh Wise	The Motorsports Group	Chevrolet	298	0	running	25	$26,716
20	29	15	Scott Riggs	Rick Ware Racing	Ford	298	0	running	0	$27,341
21	24	14	Eric McClure	TriStar Motorsports	Toyota	296	0	running	23	$26,591
22	27	5	Brad Sweet	JR Motorsports	Chevrolet	296	0	running	22	$26,541
23	33	01	Mike Wallace	JD Motorsports	Chevrolet	296	0	running	21	$26,491
24	20	87	Joe Nemechek	NEMCO Motorsports	Toyota	293	0	running	20	$26,441
25	39	24	Blake Koch	SR² Motorsports	Toyota	292	0	running	19	$26,866
26	31	92	Dexter Stacey	KH Motorsports	Ford	292	0	running	18	$19,650
27	37	23	Robert Richardson Jr.	R3 Motorsports	Chevrolet	291	0	running	17	$26,266
28	36	74	Mike Harmon	Mike Harmon Racing	Chevrolet	285	0	running	16	$26,191
29	38	70	Brad Teague	ML Motorsports	Toyota	271	0	running	15	$26,141
30	35	00	Jason White	SR² Motorsports	Toyota	261	0	crash	14	$25,891
31	25	44	Hal Martin	TriStar Motorsports	Toyota	158	0	crash	13	$25,386
32	30	79	Jeffrey Earnhardt	Go Green Racing	Ford	157	0	crash	12	$25,251
33	22	51	Jeremy Clements	Jeremy Clements Racing	Chevrolet	122	0	crash	11	$25,136
34	19	30	Nelson Piquet Jr.	Turner Scott Motorsports	Chevrolet	104	0	crash	10	$25,101
35	32	55	Jamie Dick	Viva Motorsports	Chevrolet	102	0	crash	9	$18,405
36	5	11	Elliott Sadler	Joe Gibbs Racing	Toyota	85	0	engine	8	$24,691
37	28	10	Jeff Green	TriStar Motorsports	Toyota	38	0	vibration	7	$16,990
38	21	42	J. J. Yeley	The Motorsports Group	Chevrolet	7	0	vibration	0	$16,931
39	23	46	Chase Miller	The Motorsports Group	Chevrolet	7	0	ignition	5	$16,830
40	40	27	Michael McDowell	SR² Motorsports	Toyota	2	0	handling	0	$16,805
Failed to qualify or withdrew
41		89	Morgan Shepherd	Shepherd Racing Ventures	Chevrolet					
42		4	Danny Efland	JD Motorsports	Chevrolet					
43		52	Joey Gase	Jimmy Means Racing	Chevrolet					
WD		86	Kevin Lepage	Deware Racing Group	Ford					
Official race results

Previous race: 2013 Sam's Town 300	NASCAR Nationwide Series; 2013 season	Next race: 2013 Royal Purple 300
