= 2013 O'Reilly Auto Parts 300 =

Sixth race of the 2013 NASCAR Nationwide Series

Race details
- Race 6 of 33 of the 2013 NASCAR Nationwide Series
- Date: April 12, 2013
- Official name: 17th Annual O'Reilly Auto Parts 300
- Location: Fort Worth, Texas, Texas Motor Speedway
- Course: Permanent racing facility
- Course length: 1.5 miles (2.41 km)
- Distance: 200 laps, 300 mi (482.803 km)
- Scheduled distance: 200 laps, 300 mi (482.803 km)
- Average speed: 123.853 miles per hour (199.322 km/h)

Pole position
Driver	Alex Bowman	RAB Racing
- Time: 29.441

Most laps led
Driver	Kyle Busch	Joe Gibbs Racing
- Laps: 91

Winner
No. 54	Kyle Busch	Joe Gibbs Racing

Television in the United States
- Network: ESPN
- Announcers: Allen Bestwick, Carl Edwards, Andy Petree

Radio in the United States
- Radio: Performance Racing Network

The 2013 O'Reilly Auto Parts 300 was the sixth stock car race of the 2013 NASCAR Nationwide Series and the 17th iteration of the event. The race was held on Friday, April 12, 2013, in Fort Worth, Texas at Texas Motor Speedway, a 1.5 miles (2.4 km) permanent tri-oval shaped racetrack. The race took the scheduled 200 laps to complete. Kyle Busch, driving for Joe Gibbs Racing, would dominate the race to win his 55th career NASCAR Nationwide Series win, his fourth of the season, and his third consecutive win. To fill out the podium, Brad Keselowski of Penske Racing and Austin Dillon of Richard Childress Racing would finish second and third, respectively.

== Background ==
The layout of Texas Motor Speedway, the venue where the race was held.

Texas Motor Speedway is a speedway located in the northernmost portion of the U.S. city of Fort Worth, Texas – the portion located in Denton County, Texas. The track measures 1.5 miles (2.4 km) around and is banked 24 degrees in the turns, and is of the oval design, where the front straightaway juts outward slightly. The track layout is similar to Atlanta Motor Speedway and Charlotte Motor Speedway (formerly Lowe's Motor Speedway). The track is owned by Speedway Motorsports, Inc., the same company that owns Atlanta and Charlotte Motor Speedway, as well as the short-track Bristol Motor Speedway.

=== Entry list ===
#	Driver	Team	Make	Sponsor
00	Michael McDowell	SR² Motorsports	Toyota	Hoovey
01	Mike Wallace	JD Motorsports	Chevrolet	G&K Services
2	Brian Scott	Richard Childress Racing	Chevrolet	Husky Liners
3	Austin Dillon	Richard Childress Racing	Chevrolet	AdvoCare
4	Landon Cassill	JD Motorsports	Chevrolet	Flex Seal
5	Kasey Kahne	JR Motorsports	Chevrolet	Great Clips
6	Trevor Bayne	Roush Fenway Racing	Ford	Cargill "Our Certified Ground Beef"
7	Regan Smith	JR Motorsports	Chevrolet	TaxSlayer
10	Jeff Green	TriStar Motorsports	Toyota	TriStar Motorsports
11	Elliott Sadler	Joe Gibbs Racing	Toyota	OneMain Financial
12	Sam Hornish Jr.	Penske Racing	Ford	Alliance Truck Parts
14	Eric McClure	TriStar Motorsports	Toyota	Hefty, Reynolds Wrap
15	Juan Carlos Blum	Rick Ware Racing	Ford	VMP Nutrition
16	Chris Buescher	Roush Fenway Racing	Ford	Ford EcoBoost
18	Matt Kenseth	Joe Gibbs Racing	Toyota	Reser's Fine Foods
19	Mike Bliss	TriStar Motorsports	Toyota	TriStar Motorsports
20	Brian Vickers	Joe Gibbs Racing	Toyota	Dollar General
22	Brad Keselowski	Penske Racing	Ford	Discount Tire
23	Robert Richardson Jr.	R3 Motorsports	Chevrolet	Willbros
24	Blake Koch	SR² Motorsports	Toyota	Compassion International
27	Jason White	SR² Motorsports	Toyota	#teamBOOM!
30	Nelson Piquet Jr.	Turner Scott Motorsports	Chevrolet	Worx Yard Tools
31	Justin Allgaier	Turner Scott Motorsports	Chevrolet	Brandt Professional Agriculture
32	Kyle Larson	Turner Scott Motorsports	Chevrolet	Cessna
33	Kevin Harvick	Richard Childress Racing	Chevrolet	Hunt Brothers Pizza
40	Josh Wise	The Motorsports Group	Chevrolet	The Motorsports Group
42	J. J. Yeley	The Motorsports Group	Chevrolet	The Motorsports Group
43	Reed Sorenson	Richard Petty Motorsports	Ford	Pilot Flying J
44	Hal Martin	TriStar Motorsports	Toyota	American Custom Yachts
46	Chase Miller	The Motorsports Group	Chevrolet	The Motorsports Group
47	Scott Riggs	The Motorsports Group	Chevrolet	The Motorsports Group
51	Jeremy Clements	Jeremy Clements Racing	Chevrolet	ETS Oilfield Services, U.S. Petroleum Consultants
52	Joey Gase	Jimmy Means Racing	Chevrolet	Better Business Bureau
54	Kyle Busch	Joe Gibbs Racing	Toyota	Monster Energy
55	Jamie Dick	Viva Motorsports	Chevrolet	Viva Motorsports
60	Travis Pastrana	Roush Fenway Racing	Ford	Roush Fenway Racing Patriotic
70	Johanna Long	ML Motorsports	Chevrolet	Foretravel Motorcoach
74	Kevin Lepage	Mike Harmon Racing	Chevrolet	Carved Records
77	Parker Kligerman	Kyle Busch Motorsports	Toyota	Bandit Chippers, Camp Horsin' Around
79	Jeffrey Earnhardt	Go Green Racing	Ford	Uponor Plumbing Systems
87	Joe Nemechek	NEMCO Motorsports	Toyota	AM/FM Energy Wood & Pellet Stoves
88	Dale Earnhardt Jr.	JR Motorsports	Chevrolet	Hellmann's
92	Dexter Stacey	KH Motorsports	Ford	Maddie's Place Rocks
98	Kevin Swindell	Biagi-DenBeste Racing	Ford	Carroll Shelby Engine Co., DenBeste Water Solutions
99	Alex Bowman	RAB Racing	Toyota	SchoolTipline
Official race results

== Practice ==
=== First practice ===
The first practice session was held on Thursday, April 11, at 5:30 PM CST, and would last for an hour and 20 minutes. Regan Smith of JR Motorsports would set the fastest time in the session, with a lap of 29.825 and an average speed of 181.056 miles per hour (291.381 km/h).

Pos.	#	Driver	Team	Make	Time	Speed
1	7	Regan Smith	JR Motorsports	Chevrolet	29.825	181.056
2	3	Austin Dillon	Richard Childress Racing	Chevrolet	29.838	180.977
3	54	Kyle Busch	Joe Gibbs Racing	Toyota	29.887	180.681
Full first practice results

=== Second and final practice ===
The second and final practice session, sometimes referred to as Happy Hour, was held on Friday, April 12, at 2:00 PM CST, and would last for an hour and 20 minutes. Regan Smith of JR Motorsports would set the fastest time in the session, with a lap of 29.122 and an average speed of 185.427 miles per hour (298.416 km/h).

Pos.	#	Driver	Team	Make	Time	Speed
1	7	Regan Smith	JR Motorsports	Chevrolet	29.122	185.427
2	99	Alex Bowman	RAB Racing	Toyota	29.188	185.008
3	77	Parker Kligerman	Kyle Busch Motorsports	Toyota	29.355	183.955
Full Happy Hour practice results

== Qualifying ==
Qualifying was held on Friday, April 12, at 4:05 PM CST. Each driver would have two laps to set a fastest time; the fastest of the two would count as their official qualifying lap.

Alex Bowman of RAB Racing would win the pole, setting a time of 29.441 and an average speed of 183.418 miles per hour (295.183 km/h).

Five drivers would fail to qualify: Scott Riggs, Joey Gase, Chase Miller, Jason White, and Michael McDowell.

=== Full qualifying results ===
Pos.	#	Driver	Team	Make	Time	Speed
1	99	Alex Bowman	RAB Racing	Toyota	29.441	183.418
2	54	Kyle Busch	Joe Gibbs Racing	Toyota	29.478	183.187
3	3	Austin Dillon	Richard Childress Racing	Chevrolet	29.483	183.156
4	12	Sam Hornish Jr.	Penske Racing	Ford	29.519	182.933
5	22	Brad Keselowski	Penske Racing	Ford	29.526	182.890
6	7	Regan Smith	JR Motorsports	Chevrolet	29.556	182.704
7	33	Kevin Harvick	Richard Childress Racing	Chevrolet	29.572	182.605
8	77	Parker Kligerman	Kyle Busch Motorsports	Toyota	29.595	182.463
9	18	Matt Kenseth	Joe Gibbs Racing	Toyota	29.598	182.445
10	11	Elliott Sadler	Joe Gibbs Racing	Toyota	29.602	182.420
11	88	Dale Earnhardt Jr.	JR Motorsports	Chevrolet	29.614	182.346
12	32	Kyle Larson	Turner Scott Motorsports	Chevrolet	29.641	182.180
13	20	Brian Vickers	Joe Gibbs Racing	Toyota	29.710	181.757
14	31	Justin Allgaier	Turner Scott Motorsports	Chevrolet	29.737	181.592
15	6	Trevor Bayne	Roush Fenway Racing	Ford	29.737	181.592
16	5	Kasey Kahne	JR Motorsports	Chevrolet	29.812	181.135
17	98	Kevin Swindell	Biagi-DenBeste Racing	Ford	29.850	180.905
18	19	Mike Bliss	TriStar Motorsports	Chevrolet	29.892	180.650
19	30	Nelson Piquet Jr.	Turner Scott Motorsports	Chevrolet	29.901	180.596
20	2	Brian Scott	Richard Childress Racing	Chevrolet	29.993	180.042
21	60	Travis Pastrana	Roush Fenway Racing	Ford	30.046	179.724
22	51	Jeremy Clements	Jeremy Clements Racing	Chevrolet	30.100	179.402
23	16	Chris Buescher	Roush Fenway Racing	Ford	30.125	179.253
24	70	Johanna Long	ML Motorsports	Chevrolet	30.147	179.122
25	43	Reed Sorenson	Richard Petty Motorsports	Ford	30.153	179.087
26	4	Landon Cassill	JD Motorsports	Chevrolet	30.280	178.336
27	87	Joe Nemechek	NEMCO Motorsports	Toyota	30.284	178.312
28	01	Mike Wallace	JD Motorsports	Chevrolet	30.314	178.136
29	10	Jeff Green	TriStar Motorsports	Toyota	30.325	178.071
30	92	Dexter Stacey	KH Motorsports	Ford	30.396	177.655
31	55	Jamie Dick	Viva Motorsports	Chevrolet	30.498	177.061
32	44	Hal Martin	TriStar Motorsports	Toyota	30.531	176.869
33	40	Josh Wise	The Motorsports Group	Chevrolet	30.612	176.401
34	74	Kevin Lepage	Mike Harmon Racing	Chevrolet	30.803	175.308
35	24	Blake Koch	SR² Motorsports	Toyota	30.816	175.234
36	79	Jeffrey Earnhardt	Go Green Racing	Ford	30.862	174.972
Qualified by owner's points
37	14	Eric McClure	TriStar Motorsports	Toyota	31.340	172.304
38	23	Robert Richardson Jr.	R3 Motorsports	Chevrolet	31.414	171.898
39	15	Juan Carlos Blum	Rick Ware Racing	Ford	31.971	168.903
Last car to qualify on time
40	42	J. J. Yeley	The Motorsports Group	Chevrolet	30.641	176.234
Failed to qualify
41	47	Scott Riggs	The Motorsports Group	Chevrolet	30.772	175.484
42	52	Joey Gase	Jimmy Means Racing	Chevrolet	30.828	175.165
43	46	Chase Miller	The Motorsports Group	Chevrolet	30.942	174.520
44	27	Jason White	SR² Motorsports	Toyota	31.232	172.900
45	00	Michael McDowell	SR² Motorsports	Toyota	31.607	170.848
Official starting lineup

== Race results ==
Fin	St	#	Driver	Team	Make	Laps	Led	Status	Pts	Winnings
1	2	54	Kyle Busch	Joe Gibbs Racing	Toyota	200	91	running	0	$70,225
2	5	22	Brad Keselowski	Penske Racing	Ford	200	33	running	0	$53,225
3	3	3	Austin Dillon	Richard Childress Racing	Chevrolet	200	0	running	41	$51,325
4	11	88	Dale Earnhardt Jr.	JR Motorsports	Chevrolet	200	0	running	0	$35,125
5	7	33	Kevin Harvick	Richard Childress Racing	Chevrolet	200	0	running	0	$29,225
6	9	18	Matt Kenseth	Joe Gibbs Racing	Toyota	200	12	running	0	$25,300
7	6	7	Regan Smith	JR Motorsports	Chevrolet	200	0	running	37	$29,250
8	16	5	Kasey Kahne	JR Motorsports	Chevrolet	200	26	running	0	$21,875
9	13	20	Brian Vickers	Joe Gibbs Racing	Toyota	200	0	running	35	$27,585
10	14	31	Justin Allgaier	Turner Scott Motorsports	Chevrolet	200	0	running	34	$28,200
11	20	2	Brian Scott	Richard Childress Racing	Chevrolet	200	0	running	33	$26,725
12	8	77	Parker Kligerman	Kyle Busch Motorsports	Toyota	200	0	running	32	$26,475
13	10	11	Elliott Sadler	Joe Gibbs Racing	Toyota	200	0	running	31	$27,225
14	1	99	Alex Bowman	RAB Racing	Toyota	200	4	running	31	$30,265
15	25	43	Reed Sorenson	Richard Petty Motorsports	Ford	200	0	running	29	$26,130
16	17	98	Kevin Swindell	Biagi-DenBeste Racing	Ford	200	0	running	28	$25,745
17	23	16	Chris Buescher	Roush Fenway Racing	Ford	200	0	running	27	$25,235
18	19	30	Nelson Piquet Jr.	Turner Scott Motorsports	Chevrolet	200	0	running	26	$24,650
19	27	87	Joe Nemechek	NEMCO Motorsports	Toyota	200	0	running	25	$24,515
20	18	19	Mike Bliss	TriStar Motorsports	Chevrolet	199	0	running	24	$25,080
21	28	01	Mike Wallace	JD Motorsports	Chevrolet	199	1	running	24	$24,295
22	36	79	Jeffrey Earnhardt	Go Green Racing	Ford	199	1	running	23	$24,185
23	30	92	Dexter Stacey	KH Motorsports	Ford	199	0	running	21	$24,000
24	35	24	Blake Koch	SR² Motorsports	Toyota	199	1	running	21	$23,890
25	31	55	Jamie Dick	Viva Motorsports	Chevrolet	199	0	running	19	$24,230
26	15	6	Trevor Bayne	Roush Fenway Racing	Ford	198	0	running	18	$23,645
27	24	70	Johanna Long	ML Motorsports	Chevrolet	197	0	running	17	$23,535
28	34	74	Kevin Lepage	Mike Harmon Racing	Chevrolet	195	0	running	16	$23,415
29	39	15	Juan Carlos Blum	Rick Ware Racing	Ford	194	0	running	15	$23,240
30	37	14	Eric McClure	TriStar Motorsports	Toyota	194	0	running	14	$23,430
31	38	23	Robert Richardson Jr.	R3 Motorsports	Chevrolet	190	0	running	13	$23,000
32	12	32	Kyle Larson	Turner Scott Motorsports	Chevrolet	190	0	running	12	$22,890
33	21	60	Travis Pastrana	Roush Fenway Racing	Ford	186	0	running	11	$22,775
34	4	12	Sam Hornish Jr.	Penske Racing	Ford	159	29	running	11	$22,664
35	22	51	Jeremy Clements	Jeremy Clements Racing	Chevrolet	142	1	crash	10	$22,547
36	26	4	Landon Cassill	JD Motorsports	Chevrolet	120	1	engine	0	$21,195
37	33	40	Josh Wise	The Motorsports Group	Chevrolet	97	0	electrical	7	$15,075
38	32	44	Hal Martin	TriStar Motorsports	Toyota	53	0	transmission	6	$15,040
39	40	42	J. J. Yeley	The Motorsports Group	Chevrolet	10	0	electrical	0	$14,790
40	29	10	Jeff Green	TriStar Motorsports	Toyota	3	0	vibration	4	$14,755
Failed to qualify
41		47	Scott Riggs	The Motorsports Group	Chevrolet					
42		52	Joey Gase	Jimmy Means Racing	Chevrolet					
43		46	Chase Miller	The Motorsports Group	Chevrolet					
44		27	Jason White	SR² Motorsports	Toyota					
45		00	Michael McDowell	SR² Motorsports	Toyota					
Official race results

Previous race: 2013 Royal Purple 300	NASCAR Nationwide Series; 2013 season	Next race: 2013 ToyotaCare 250
