= 2013 ToyotaCare 250 =

Seventh race of the 2013 NASCAR Nationwide Series

Race details
- Race 7 of 33 of the 2013 NASCAR Nationwide Series
- Date: April 26, 2013
- Official name: 26th Annual ToyotaCare 250
- Location: Richmond, Virginia, Richmond International Raceway
- Course: Permanent racing facility
- Course length: 0.75 miles (1.21 km)
- Distance: 250 laps, 187.5 mi (301.752 km)
- Scheduled distance: 250 laps, 187.5 mi (301.752 km)
- Average speed: 83.768 miles per hour (134.812 km/h)

Pole position
Driver	Brad Keselowski	Penske Racing
- Time: 21.371

Most laps led
Driver	Kevin Harvick	Richard Childress Racing
- Laps: 96

Winner
No. 22	Brad Keselowski	Penske Racing

Television in the United States
- Network: ESPNews
- Announcers: Allen Bestwick, Carl Edwards, Andy Petree

Radio in the United States
- Radio: Motor Racing Network

The 2013 ToyotaCare 250 was the seventh stock car race of the 2013 NASCAR Nationwide Series and the 26th iteration of the event. The race was held on Friday, April 26, 2013, in Richmond, Virginia, at Richmond International Raceway, a 0.75 miles (1.21 km) D-shaped oval. The race took the scheduled 250 laps to complete. Brad Keselowski, driving for Penske Racing, would hold off eventual second-place finisher, Richard Childress Racing driver Kevin Harvick with 12 to go to win his 21st career NASCAR Nationwide Series win and his first win of the season. To fill out the podium, Kyle Busch of Joe Gibbs Racing would finish third.

== Background ==
The layout of Richmond International Raceway, the venue where the race was at.

Richmond International Raceway (RIR) is a 3/4-mile (1.2 km), D-shaped, asphalt race track located just outside Richmond, Virginia in Henrico County. It hosts the Monster Energy NASCAR Cup Series and Xfinity Series. Known as "America's premier short track", it formerly hosted a NASCAR Camping World Truck Series race, an IndyCar Series race, and two USAC sprint car races.

=== Entry list ===
#	Driver	Team	Make	Sponsor
00	Michael McDowell	SR² Motorsports	Toyota	Support Military
01	Mike Wallace	JD Motorsports	Chevrolet	S. B. Ballard Construction Co.
2	Brian Scott	Richard Childress Racing	Chevrolet	Shore Lodge
3	Austin Dillon	Richard Childress Racing	Chevrolet	AdvoCare
4	Landon Cassill	JD Motorsports	Chevrolet	Flex Seal
5	Jeffrey Earnhardt	JR Motorsports	Chevrolet	Keen Parts
6	Trevor Bayne	Roush Fenway Racing	Ford	Ford EcoBoost
7	Regan Smith	JR Motorsports	Chevrolet	TaxSlayer
8	Scott Lagasse Jr.	Team SLR	Chevrolet	Incredible Pizza, Boy Scouts of America
10	Jeff Green	TriStar Motorsports	Toyota	TriStar Motorsports
11	Elliott Sadler	Joe Gibbs Racing	Toyota	Sport Clips Haircuts
12	Sam Hornish Jr.	Penske Racing	Ford	Alliance Truck Parts
14	Eric McClure	TriStar Motorsports	Toyota	Hefty, Reynolds Wrap
15	Stanton Barrett	Rick Ware Racing	Ford	FAIR Girls
16	Ryan Reed	Roush Fenway Racing	Ford	American Diabetes Association
17	Tanner Berryhill	Vision Racing	Toyota	Keller Williams Realty "What's Your One Thing?"
19	Mike Bliss	TriStar Motorsports	Toyota	TriStar Motorsports
20	Brian Vickers	Joe Gibbs Racing	Toyota	Dollar General
22	Brad Keselowski	Penske Racing	Ford	Discount Tire, SKF
23	Robert Richardson Jr.	R3 Motorsports	Chevrolet	R3 Motorsports
24	Blake Koch	SR² Motorsports	Toyota	O.C.R. Gaz Bar
29	Kenny Wallace	RAB Racing	Toyota	ToyotaCare
30	Nelson Piquet Jr.	Turner Scott Motorsports	Chevrolet	Delavaco
31	Justin Allgaier	Turner Scott Motorsports	Chevrolet	Brandt Professional Agriculture
32	Kyle Larson	Turner Scott Motorsports	Chevrolet	Cessna
33	Kevin Harvick	Richard Childress Racing	Chevrolet	Hungryman, Armour
40	Josh Wise	The Motorsports Group	Chevrolet	Curtis Key Plumbing
42	J. J. Yeley	The Motorsports Group	Chevrolet	The Motorsports Group
43	Reed Sorenson	Richard Petty Motorsports	Ford	Pilot Flying J
44	Hal Martin	TriStar Motorsports	Toyota	American Custom Yachts
46	Chase Miller	The Motorsports Group	Chevrolet	The Motorsports Group
47	Jason Bowles	The Motorsports Group	Chevrolet	The Motorsports Group
51	Jeremy Clements	Jeremy Clements Racing	Chevrolet	Jeremy Clements Racing
52	Derek Thorn	Jimmy Means Racing	Toyota	Jimmy Means Racing
54	Kyle Busch	Joe Gibbs Racing	Toyota	Monster Energy
55	Jamie Dick	Viva Motorsports	Chevrolet	Viva Motorsports
60	Travis Pastrana	Roush Fenway Racing	Ford	Roush Fenway Racing
70	Johanna Long	ML Motorsports	Chevrolet	Foretravel Motorcoach
74	Juan Carlos Blum	Mike Harmon Racing	Chevrolet	VMP Nutrition, Hahayoo "Digital Media... Evolved"
77	Parker Kligerman	Kyle Busch Motorsports	Toyota	Toyota
79	Joey Gase	Go Green Racing	Ford	Donate Life Virginia
87	Joe Nemechek	NEMCO Motorsports	Toyota	AM/FM Energy Wood & Pellet Stoves
89	Morgan Shepherd	Shepherd Racing Ventures	Chevrolet	Racing with Jesus "Crank It Up" Campaign
92	Dexter Stacey	KH Motorsports	Ford	Maddie's Place Rocks
98	Kevin Swindell	Biagi-DenBeste Racing	Ford	Carroll Shelby Engine Co., DenBeste Water Solutions
99	Alex Bowman	RAB Racing	Toyota	SchoolTipline
Official entry list

== Practice ==
=== First practice ===
The first practice session was held on Thursday, April 25, at 9:00 AM EST, and would last for two hours and 50 minutes. Brad Keselowski of Penske Racing would set the fastest time in the session, with a lap of 21.832 and an average speed of 123.672 miles per hour (199.031 km/h).

Pos.	#	Driver	Team	Make	Time	Speed
1	22	Brad Keselowski	Penske Racing	Ford	21.832	123.672
2	99	Alex Bowman	RAB Racing	Toyota	21.848	123.581
3	54	Kyle Busch	Joe Gibbs Racing	Toyota	21.902	123.276
Full first practice results

=== Second and final practice ===
The second and final practice session, sometimes referred to as Happy Hour, was held on Friday, April 26, at 9:00 AM EST, and would last for two hours and 30 minutes. Kyle Busch of Joe Gibbs Racing would set the fastest time in the session, with a lap of 21.620 and an average speed of 124.884 miles per hour (200.981 km/h).

Pos.	#	Driver	Team	Make	Time	Speed
1	54	Kyle Busch	Joe Gibbs Racing	Toyota	21.620	124.884
2	29	Kenny Wallace	RAB Racing	Toyota	21.696	124.447
3	11	Elliott Sadler	Joe Gibbs Racing	Toyota	21.716	124.332
Full Happy Hour practice results

== Qualifying ==
Qualifying was held on Friday, April 26, at 4:05 PM EST. Each driver would have two laps to set a fastest time; the fastest of the two would count as their official qualifying lap.

Brad Keselowski of Penske Racing would win the pole, setting a time of 21.371 and an average speed of 126.339 miles per hour (203.323 km/h).

Six drivers would fail to qualify: Jamie Dick, Derek Thorn, Jason Bowles, Chase Miller, Morgan Shepherd, and Stanton Barrett.

=== Full qualifying results ===
Pos.	#	Driver	Team	Make	Time	Speed
1	22	Brad Keselowski	Penske Racing	Ford	21.371	126.339
2	54	Kyle Busch	Joe Gibbs Racing	Toyota	21.378	126.298
3	12	Sam Hornish Jr.	Penske Racing	Ford	21.472	125.745
4	33	Kevin Harvick	Richard Childress Racing	Chevrolet	21.520	125.465
5	29	Kenny Wallace	RAB Racing	Toyota	21.551	125.284
6	3	Austin Dillon	Richard Childress Racing	Chevrolet	21.588	125.069
7	6	Trevor Bayne	Roush Fenway Racing	Ford	21.642	124.757
8	2	Brian Scott	Richard Childress Racing	Chevrolet	21.654	124.688
9	20	Brian Vickers	Joe Gibbs Racing	Toyota	21.657	124.671
10	43	Reed Sorenson	Richard Petty Motorsports	Ford	21.662	124.642
11	31	Justin Allgaier	Turner Scott Motorsports	Chevrolet	21.691	124.476
12	99	Alex Bowman	RAB Racing	Toyota	21.710	124.367
13	70	Johanna Long	ML Motorsports	Chevrolet	21.738	124.206
14	11	Elliott Sadler	Joe Gibbs Racing	Toyota	21.762	124.069
15	16	Ryan Reed	Roush Fenway Racing	Ford	21.764	124.058
16	7	Regan Smith	JR Motorsports	Chevrolet	21.771	124.018
17	60	Travis Pastrana	Roush Fenway Racing	Ford	21.779	123.973
18	32	Kyle Larson	Turner Scott Motorsports	Chevrolet	21.833	123.666
19	4	Landon Cassill	JD Motorsports	Chevrolet	21.841	123.621
20	19	Mike Bliss	TriStar Motorsports	Toyota	21.914	123.209
21	98	Kevin Swindell	Biagi-DenBeste Racing	Ford	21.930	123.119
22	5	Jeffrey Earnhardt	JR Motorsports	Chevrolet	21.940	123.063
23	30	Nelson Piquet Jr.	Turner Scott Motorsports	Chevrolet	21.961	122.945
24	10	Jeff Green	TriStar Motorsports	Toyota	21.979	122.845
25	87	Joe Nemechek	NEMCO Motorsports	Toyota	21.984	122.817
26	00	Michael McDowell	SR² Motorsports	Toyota	22.019	122.621
27	8	Scott Lagasse Jr.	Team SLR	Chevrolet	22.020	122.616
28	44	Hal Martin	TriStar Motorsports	Toyota	22.119	122.067
29	42	J. J. Yeley	The Motorsports Group	Chevrolet	22.119	122.067
30	77	Parker Kligerman	Kyle Busch Motorsports	Toyota	22.128	122.017
31	24	Blake Koch	SR² Motorsports	Toyota	22.163	121.825
32	51	Jeremy Clements	Jeremy Clements Racing	Chevrolet	22.176	121.753
33	79	Joey Gase	Go Green Racing	Ford	22.185	121.704
34	92	Dexter Stacey	KH Motorsports	Ford	22.284	121.163
35	40	Josh Wise	The Motorsports Group	Chevrolet	22.293	121.114
36	01	Mike Wallace	JD Motorsports	Chevrolet	22.308	121.033
37	14	Eric McClure	TriStar Motorsports	Toyota	22.343	120.843
Qualified by owner's points
38	23	Robert Richardson Jr.	R3 Motorsports	Chevrolet	22.613	119.400
39	74	Juan Carlos Blum	Mike Harmon Racing	Chevrolet	22.675	119.074
Last car to qualify on time
40	17	Tanner Berryhill	Vision Racing	Toyota	22.352	120.795
Failed to qualify
41	55	Jamie Dick	Viva Motorsports	Chevrolet	22.469	120.166
42	52	Derek Thorn	Jimmy Means Racing	Toyota	22.526	119.861
43	47	Jason Bowles	The Motorsports Group	Chevrolet	22.591	119.517
44	46	Chase Miller	The Motorsports Group	Chevrolet	22.704	118.922
45	89	Morgan Shepherd	Shepherd Racing Ventures	Chevrolet	22.856	118.131
46	15	Stanton Barrett	Rick Ware Racing	Ford	22.960	117.596
Official starting lineup

== Race results ==
Fin	St	#	Driver	Team	Make	Laps	Led	Status	Pts	Winnings
1	1	22	Brad Keselowski	Penske Racing	Ford	250	35	running	0	$47,990
2	4	33	Kevin Harvick	Richard Childress Racing	Chevrolet	250	96	running	0	$34,250
3	2	54	Kyle Busch	Joe Gibbs Racing	Toyota	250	18	running	0	$23,525
4	9	20	Brian Vickers	Joe Gibbs Racing	Toyota	250	0	running	40	$27,050
5	16	7	Regan Smith	JR Motorsports	Chevrolet	250	0	running	39	$25,475
6	14	11	Elliott Sadler	Joe Gibbs Racing	Toyota	250	18	running	39	$23,625
7	3	12	Sam Hornish Jr.	Penske Racing	Ford	250	83	running	38	$22,385
8	18	32	Kyle Larson	Turner Scott Motorsports	Chevrolet	250	0	running	36	$25,295
9	17	60	Travis Pastrana	Roush Fenway Racing	Ford	250	0	running	35	$21,775
10	10	43	Reed Sorenson	Richard Petty Motorsports	Ford	250	0	running	34	$22,750
11	30	77	Parker Kligerman	Kyle Busch Motorsports	Toyota	250	0	running	33	$21,325
12	7	6	Trevor Bayne	Roush Fenway Racing	Ford	250	0	running	32	$21,225
13	20	19	Mike Bliss	TriStar Motorsports	Toyota	250	0	running	31	$21,125
14	23	30	Nelson Piquet Jr.	Turner Scott Motorsports	Chevrolet	250	0	running	30	$21,075
15	13	70	Johanna Long	ML Motorsports	Chevrolet	250	0	running	29	$21,950
16	15	16	Ryan Reed	Roush Fenway Racing	Ford	250	0	running	28	$15,150
17	22	5	Jeffrey Earnhardt	JR Motorsports	Chevrolet	250	0	running	27	$20,725
18	21	98	Kevin Swindell	Biagi-DenBeste Racing	Ford	250	0	running	26	$14,625
19	19	4	Landon Cassill	JD Motorsports	Chevrolet	250	0	running	0	$20,550
20	8	2	Brian Scott	Richard Childress Racing	Chevrolet	250	0	running	24	$21,175
21	27	8	Scott Lagasse Jr.	Team SLR	Chevrolet	250	0	running	23	$14,450
22	26	00	Michael McDowell	SR² Motorsports	Toyota	249	0	running	0	$20,375
23	25	87	Joe Nemechek	NEMCO Motorsports	Toyota	248	0	running	21	$20,300
24	28	44	Hal Martin	TriStar Motorsports	Toyota	248	0	running	20	$20,250
25	31	24	Blake Koch	SR² Motorsports	Toyota	247	0	running	19	$20,650
26	37	14	Eric McClure	TriStar Motorsports	Toyota	247	0	running	18	$20,125
27	12	99	Alex Bowman	RAB Racing	Toyota	246	0	running	17	$20,075
28	40	17	Tanner Berryhill	Vision Racing	Toyota	246	0	running	16	$14,000
29	39	74	Juan Carlos Blum	Mike Harmon Racing	Chevrolet	245	0	running	15	$19,950
30	33	79	Joey Gase	Go Green Racing	Ford	244	0	running	14	$20,200
31	11	31	Justin Allgaier	Turner Scott Motorsports	Chevrolet	244	0	running	13	$19,830
32	38	23	Robert Richardson Jr.	R3 Motorsports	Chevrolet	239	0	running	12	$19,785
33	36	01	Mike Wallace	JD Motorsports	Chevrolet	233	0	engine	11	$19,740
34	35	40	Josh Wise	The Motorsports Group	Chevrolet	222	0	running	10	$19,620
35	6	3	Austin Dillon	Richard Childress Racing	Chevrolet	210	0	crash	9	$19,537
36	5	29	Kenny Wallace	RAB Racing	Toyota	142	0	rear gear	8	$12,650
37	32	51	Jeremy Clements	Jeremy Clements Racing	Chevrolet	36	0	engine	7	$18,590
38	34	92	Dexter Stacey	KH Motorsports	Ford	22	0	crash	6	$18,536
39	29	42	J. J. Yeley	The Motorsports Group	Chevrolet	7	0	electrical	0	$12,420
40	24	10	Jeff Green	TriStar Motorsports	Toyota	4	0	vibration	4	$12,380
Failed to qualify
41		55	Jamie Dick	Viva Motorsports	Chevrolet					
42		52	Derek Thorn	Jimmy Means Racing	Toyota					
43		47	Jason Bowles	The Motorsports Group	Chevrolet					
44		46	Chase Miller	The Motorsports Group	Chevrolet					
45		89	Morgan Shepherd	Shepherd Racing Ventures	Chevrolet					
46		15	Stanton Barrett	Rick Ware Racing	Ford					
Official race results

Previous race: 2013 O'Reilly Auto Parts 300	NASCAR Nationwide Series; 2013 season	Next race: 2013 Aaron's 312
