= 2013 Royal Purple 300 =

Fifth race of the 2013 NASCAR Nationwide Series

Race details
- Race 5 of 33 of the 2013 NASCAR Nationwide Series
- Date: March 23, 2013
- Official name: 17th Annual Royal Purple 300
- Location: Fontana, California, Auto Club Speedway
- Course: Permanent racing facility
- Course length: 3.2 km (2 miles)
- Distance: 150 laps, 300 mi (482.803 km)
- Scheduled distance: 150 laps, 300 mi (482.803 km)
- Average speed: 141.528 miles per hour (227.767 km/h)

Pole position
Driver	Kyle Busch	Joe Gibbs Racing
- Time: 40.312

Most laps led
Driver	Kyle Busch	Joe Gibbs Racing
- Laps: 92

Winner
No. 54	Kyle Busch	Joe Gibbs Racing

Television in the United States
- Network: ESPN
- Announcers: Allen Bestwick, Rusty Wallace, Andy Petree

Radio in the United States
- Radio: Motor Racing Network

The 2013 Royal Purple 300 was the fifth stock car race of the 2013 NASCAR Nationwide Series and the 17th iteration of the event. The race was held on Saturday, March 23, 2013, in Fontana, California, at Auto Club Speedway, a 2 miles (3.2 km) permanent D-shaped oval racetrack. The race took the scheduled 150 laps to complete. At race's end, Joe Gibbs Racing driver Kyle Busch would dominate the race to win his 54th career NASCAR Nationwide Series win and his third of the season. To fill out the podium, Sam Hornish Jr. of Penske Racing and Regan Smith of JR Motorsports would finish second and third, respectively.

== Background ==
The layout of Auto Club Speedway, the venue where the race was held.

Auto Club Speedway (previously California Speedway) was a two-mile (3.2 km), low-banked, D-shaped oval superspeedway in Fontana, California which hosted NASCAR racing annually from 1997 to 2023. It was also used for open wheel racing events. The racetrack was located near the former locations of Ontario Motor Speedway and Riverside International Raceway. The track was owned and operated by International Speedway Corporation and was the only track owned by ISC to have its naming rights sold. The speedway was served by the nearby Interstate 10 and Interstate 15 freeways as well as a Metrolink station located behind the backstretch.

=== Entry list ===
#	Driver	Team	Make	Sponsor
00	Jason White	SR² Motorsports	Toyota	Headrush
01	Mike Wallace	JD Motorsports	Chevrolet	Flex Seal
2	Brian Scott	Richard Childress Racing	Chevrolet	Whitetail Club
3	Austin Dillon	Richard Childress Racing	Chevrolet	AdvoCare
4	Daryl Harr	JD Motorsports	Chevrolet	iWorld
5	Brad Sweet	JR Motorsports	Chevrolet	Great Clips
6	Trevor Bayne	Roush Fenway Racing	Ford	Cargill "Our Certified Ground Beef"
7	Regan Smith	JR Motorsports	Chevrolet	TaxSlayer
10	Jeff Green	TriStar Motorsports	Toyota	TriStar Motorsports
11	Elliott Sadler	Joe Gibbs Racing	Toyota	OneMain Financial
12	Sam Hornish Jr.	Penske Racing	Ford	Würth
14	Eric McClure	TriStar Motorsports	Toyota	Hefty, Reynolds Wrap
15	Juan Carlos Blum	Rick Ware Racing	Ford	VMP Nutrition
19	Mike Bliss	TriStar Motorsports	Toyota	DoubleTree
20	Brian Vickers	Joe Gibbs Racing	Toyota	Dollar General
22	Brad Keselowski	Penske Racing	Ford	Discount Tire
23	Carl Long	Rick Ware Racing	Ford	Industrial Technologies, Koma Unwind
24	Blake Koch	SR² Motorsports	Toyota	I Am Second
27	Michael McDowell	SR² Motorsports	Toyota	#teamBOOM!
30	Nelson Piquet Jr.	Turner Scott Motorsports	Chevrolet	Qualcomm
31	Justin Allgaier	Turner Scott Motorsports	Chevrolet	Brandt Professional Agriculture
32	Kyle Larson	Turner Scott Motorsports	Chevrolet	Eveready
33	Dakoda Armstrong	Richard Childress Racing	Chevrolet	Mudd Advertising, WinField
40	Josh Wise	The Motorsports Group	Chevrolet	The Motorsports Group
42	J. J. Yeley	The Motorsports Group	Chevrolet	The Motorsports Group
43	Reed Sorenson	Richard Petty Motorsports	Ford	Pilot Flying J
44	Hal Martin	TriStar Motorsports	Toyota	American Custom Yachts
46	Chase Miller	The Motorsports Group	Chevrolet	The Motorsports Group
47	Scott Riggs	The Motorsports Group	Chevrolet	The Motorsports Group
51	Jeremy Clements	Jeremy Clements Racing	Chevrolet	U.S. Petroleum Consultants
52	Joey Gase	Jimmy Means Racing	Chevrolet	Jimmy Means Racing
54	Kyle Busch	Joe Gibbs Racing	Toyota	Monster Energy
55	Jamie Dick	Viva Motorsports	Chevrolet	Viva Motorsports
60	Travis Pastrana	Roush Fenway Racing	Ford	Roush Fenway Racing
70	Tony Raines	ML Motorsports	Toyota	ML Motorsports
74	Mike Harmon	Mike Harmon Racing	Chevrolet	Mike Harmon Racing
77	Parker Kligerman	Kyle Busch Motorsports	Toyota	Toyota "Let's Go Places"
79	Paulie Harraka	Go Green Racing	Ford	Crackle "It's On"
87	Joe Nemechek	NEMCO Motorsports	Toyota	AM/FM Energy Wood & Pellet Stoves
92	Dexter Stacey	KH Motorsports	Ford	Maddie's Place Rocks
98	Kevin Swindell	Biagi-DenBeste Racing	Ford	Carroll Shelby Engine Co., DenBeste Water Solutions
99	Alex Bowman	RAB Racing	Toyota	St. Jude Children's Research Hospital
Official entry list

== Practice ==
The only two hours and 20 minutes practice session was held on Friday, March 22, at 1:40 PM PST. Austin Dillon of Richard Childress Racing would set the fastest time in the session, with a lap of 40.728 and an average speed of 176.783 miles per hour (284.505 km/h).

Pos.	#	Driver	Team	Make	Time	Speed
1	3	Austin Dillon	Richard Childress Racing	Chevrolet	40.728	176.783
2	32	Kyle Larson	Turner Scott Motorsports	Chevrolet	40.960	175.781
3	11	Elliott Sadler	Joe Gibbs Racing	Toyota	40.983	175.683
Full practice results

== Qualifying ==
Qualifying was held on Saturday, March 23, at 10:35 AM PST. Each driver would have two laps to set a fastest time; the fastest of the two would count as their official qualifying lap.

Kyle Busch of Joe Gibbs Racing would win the pole, setting a time of 40.312 and an average speed of 178.607 miles per hour (287.440 km/h).

Two drivers would fail to qualify: Tony Raines and Chase Miller.

=== Full qualifying results ===
Pos.	#	Driver	Team	Make	Time	Speed
1	54	Kyle Busch	Joe Gibbs Racing	Toyota	40.312	178.607
2	11	Elliott Sadler	Joe Gibbs Racing	Toyota	40.545	177.580
3	20	Brian Vickers	Joe Gibbs Racing	Toyota	40.655	177.100
4	22	Brad Keselowski	Penske Racing	Ford	40.683	176.978
5	30	Nelson Piquet Jr.	Turner Scott Motorsports	Chevrolet	40.708	176.869
6	99	Alex Bowman	RAB Racing	Toyota	40.779	176.561
7	12	Sam Hornish Jr.	Penske Racing	Ford	40.852	176.246
8	77	Parker Kligerman	Kyle Busch Motorsports	Toyota	40.878	176.134
9	32	Kyle Larson	Turner Scott Motorsports	Chevrolet	40.924	175.936
10	19	Mike Bliss	TriStar Motorsports	Toyota	40.955	175.803
11	3	Austin Dillon	Richard Childress Racing	Chevrolet	41.008	175.575
12	2	Brian Scott	Richard Childress Racing	Chevrolet	41.061	175.349
13	33	Dakoda Armstrong	Richard Childress Racing	Chevrolet	41.062	175.345
14	60	Travis Pastrana	Roush Fenway Racing	Ford	41.088	175.234
15	6	Trevor Bayne	Roush Fenway Racing	Ford	41.106	175.157
16	7	Regan Smith	JR Motorsports	Chevrolet	41.246	174.562
17	98	Kevin Swindell	Biagi-DenBeste Racing	Ford	41.383	173.984
18	31	Justin Allgaier	Turner Scott Motorsports	Chevrolet	41.443	173.733
19	43	Reed Sorenson	Richard Petty Motorsports	Ford	41.560	173.244
20	10	Jeff Green	TriStar Motorsports	Toyota	41.642	172.902
21	5	Brad Sweet	JR Motorsports	Chevrolet	41.670	172.786
22	87	Joe Nemechek	NEMCO Motorsports	Toyota	41.684	172.728
23	51	Jeremy Clements	Jeremy Clements Racing	Chevrolet	41.757	172.426
24	40	Josh Wise	The Motorsports Group	Chevrolet	41.830	172.125
25	47	Scott Riggs	The Motorsports Group	Chevrolet	41.940	171.674
26	01	Mike Wallace	JD Motorsports	Chevrolet	41.960	171.592
27	4	Daryl Harr	JD Motorsports	Chevrolet	41.971	171.547
28	79	Paulie Harraka	Go Green Racing	Ford	41.977	171.523
29	55	Jamie Dick	Viva Motorsports	Chevrolet	42.026	171.323
30	27	Michael McDowell	SR² Motorsports	Toyota	42.098	171.030
31	42	J. J. Yeley	The Motorsports Group	Chevrolet	42.286	170.269
32	52	Joey Gase	Jimmy Means Racing	Toyota	42.393	169.839
33	24	Blake Koch	SR² Motorsports	Toyota	42.496	169.428
34	44	Hal Martin	TriStar Motorsports	Toyota	42.601	169.010
35	00	Jason White	SR² Motorsports	Toyota	42.630	168.895
36	23	Carl Long	Rick Ware Racing	Ford	42.840	168.067
Qualified by owner's points
37	14	Eric McClure	TriStar Motorsports	Toyota	42.854	168.012
38	15	Juan Carlos Blum	Rick Ware Racing	Ford	43.041	167.282
39	74	Mike Harmon	Mike Harmon Racing	Chevrolet	43.795	164.402
Last car to qualify on time
40	92	Dexter Stacey	KH Motorsports	Ford	42.459	169.575
Failed to qualify
41	70	Tony Raines	ML Motorsports	Toyota	42.492	169.444
42	46	Chase Miller	The Motorsports Group	Chevrolet	42.579	169.097
Official starting lineup

== Race results ==
Fin	St	#	Driver	Team	Make	Laps	Led	Status	Pts	Winnings
1	1	54	Kyle Busch	Joe Gibbs Racing	Toyota	150	92	running	0	$74,525
2	7	12	Sam Hornish Jr.	Penske Racing	Ford	150	28	running	43	$62,025
3	16	7	Regan Smith	JR Motorsports	Chevrolet	150	0	running	41	$50,825
4	8	77	Parker Kligerman	Kyle Busch Motorsports	Toyota	150	0	running	40	$40,975
5	11	3	Austin Dillon	Richard Childress Racing	Chevrolet	150	0	running	39	$33,525
6	9	32	Kyle Larson	Turner Scott Motorsports	Chevrolet	150	0	running	38	$30,750
7	2	11	Elliott Sadler	Joe Gibbs Racing	Toyota	150	18	running	38	2$9,175
8	12	2	Brian Scott	Richard Childress Racing	Chevrolet	150	3	running	37	$26,050
9	15	6	Trevor Bayne	Roush Fenway Racing	Ford	150	0	running	35	$25,660
10	17	98	Kevin Swindell	Biagi-DenBeste Racing	Ford	150	0	running	34	$20,575
11	18	31	Justin Allgaier	Turner Scott Motorsports	Chevrolet	150	0	running	33	$25,150
12	6	99	Alex Bowman	RAB Racing	Toyota	150	0	running	32	$25,150
13	14	60	Travis Pastrana	Roush Fenway Racing	Ford	150	0	running	31	2$4,750
14	22	87	Joe Nemechek	NEMCO Motorsports	Toyota	150	3	running	31	$24,565
15	13	33	Dakoda Armstrong	Richard Childress Racing	Chevrolet	150	0	running	0	$25,605
16	5	30	Nelson Piquet Jr.	Turner Scott Motorsports	Chevrolet	150	0	running	28	$24,670
17	19	43	Reed Sorenson	Richard Petty Motorsports	Ford	150	0	running	27	$24,110
18	10	19	Mike Bliss	TriStar Motorsports	Toyota	150	0	running	26	$24,075
19	4	22	Brad Keselowski	Penske Racing	Ford	150	5	running	0	$18,415
20	24	40	Josh Wise	The Motorsports Group	Chevrolet	150	0	running	24	$24,255
21	23	51	Jeremy Clements	Jeremy Clements Racing	Chevrolet	149	1	running	24	$23,820
22	21	5	Brad Sweet	JR Motorsports	Chevrolet	149	0	running	22	$23,485
23	26	01	Mike Wallace	JD Motorsports	Chevrolet	149	0	running	21	$17,400
24	34	44	Hal Martin	TriStar Motorsports	Toyota	148	0	running	20	$23,240
25	29	55	Jamie Dick	Viva Motorsports	Chevrolet	147	0	running	19	$23,580
26	40	92	Dexter Stacey	KH Motorsports	Ford	147	0	running	18	$22,995
27	37	14	Eric McClure	TriStar Motorsports	Toyota	147	0	running	17	$22,860
28	27	4	Daryl Harr	JD Motorsports	Chevrolet	147	0	running	16	$16,740
29	38	15	Juan Carlos Blum	Rick Ware Racing	Ford	146	0	running	15	$22,565
30	36	23	Carl Long	Rick Ware Racing	Ford	145	0	running	14	$22,755
31	39	74	Mike Harmon	Mike Harmon Racing	Chevrolet	143	0	running	13	$22,325
32	33	24	Blake Koch	SR² Motorsports	Toyota	130	0	overheating	12	$22,215
33	35	00	Jason White	SR² Motorsports	Toyota	107	0	crash	11	$22,100
34	3	20	Brian Vickers	Joe Gibbs Racing	Toyota	53	0	engine	10	$22,739
35	28	79	Paulie Harraka	Go Green Racing	Ford	42	0	engine	9	$21,880
36	30	27	Michael McDowell	SR² Motorsports	Toyota	19	0	handling	0	$14,595
37	20	10	Jeff Green	TriStar Motorsports	Toyota	18	0	vibration	7	$14,475
38	31	42	J. J. Yeley	The Motorsports Group	Chevrolet	7	0	vibration	0	$14,365
39	25	47	Scott Riggs	The Motorsports Group	Chevrolet	5	0	rear gear	0	$14,115
40	32	52	Joey Gase	Jimmy Means Racing	Toyota	4	0	engine	4	$14,080
Failed to qualify
41		70	Tony Raines	ML Motorsports	Toyota					
42		46	Chase Miller	The Motorsports Group	Chevrolet					
Official qualifying results

Previous race: 2013 Jeff Foxworthy's Grit Chips 300	NASCAR Nationwide Series; 2013 season	Next race: 2013 O'Reilly Auto Parts 300
