= Matt Frahm =

American stock car racing driver (born 1990)

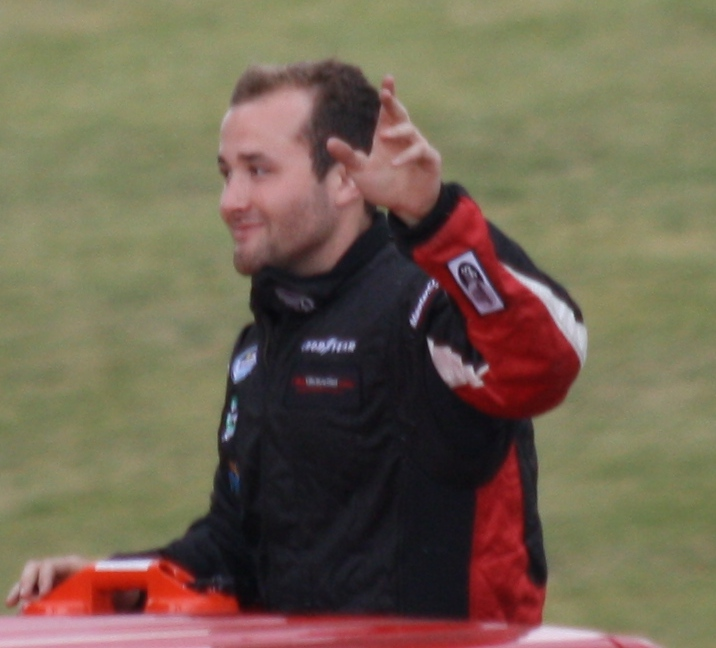
- Frahm at Road America in 2012
- Born: March 16, 1990 (age 36); North Salem, New Hampshire, U.S.

NASCAR O'Reilly Auto Parts Series career
- 15 races run over 4 years
- 2015 position: 75th
- Best finish: 57th (2012)
- First race: 2011 New England 200 (Loudon)
- Last race: 2015 U.S. Cellular 250 (Iowa)
Wins	Top tens	Poles
0	0	0

Matt Frahm (born March 16, 1990) is an American professional stock car racing driver. The North Salem, New Hampshire, resident has competed in the NASCAR Xfinity Series and K&N Pro Series East.

== Racing career ==
=== Early years ===
Frahm began racing at the age of 14. His first major breakthrough came when he started competing in the Pro All Stars Series, in which he ran a limited schedule in 2010. He has also ran in the Granite State Pro Stock Series, capturing three wins before 2014 and grabbed another victory in the second race of the 2014 season.

=== K&N Pro Series East ===
In 2010, Frahm ran three of the ten races, running a race at Martinsville Speedway and both races at New Hampshire Motor Speedway. Receiving funding from The Woodworks, he posted finishes of eighth at Martinsville, 29th at the June New Hampshire race after a radiator failure, and 19th in the September New Hampshire race.

=== Xfinity Series ===
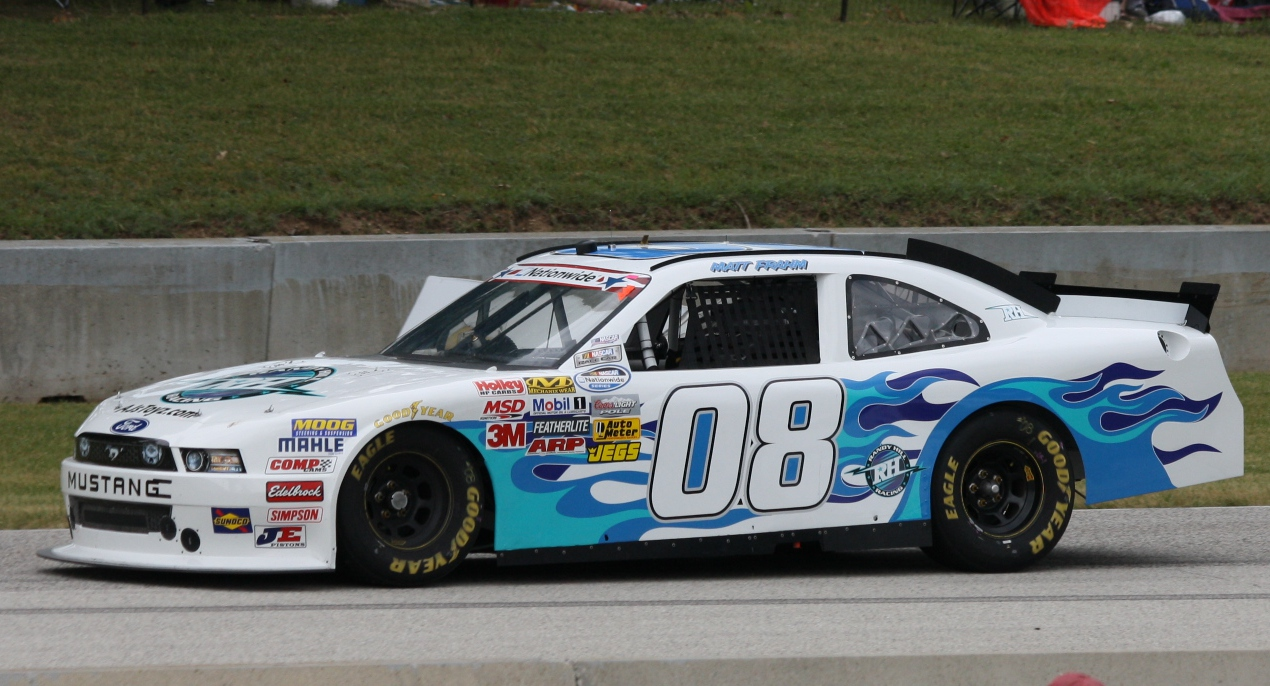
Frahm's No. 08 at Road America in 2012

Frahm made his Xfinity debut in 2011, where he made three starts for Go Green Racing in the No. 39 car. He had one crash, at Phoenix International Raceway. He posted finishes of 26th at New Hampshire and 25th at Lucas Oil Raceway. In 2012, he made a career-high six starts. One, at Richmond International Raceway, was for Go Green. His next start, at Darlington Raceway, was for Randy Hill Racing. The next week at Iowa Speedway, Frahm drove the No. 42 car for Curtis Key and The Motorsports Group. After that, Frahm made three more starts for RHR. He start and parked for two, at Road America and Kentucky Speedway. His best finish came in the one that he did not start and park in, a 25th at New Hampshire. Frahm's next start came at New Hampshire in 2014, driving TriStar Motorsports' No. 44 Toyota Camry. He matched his 2012 finish with another 25th. Frahm would attempt three more races that season with The Motorsports Group. In his first race for TMG, at Iowa, his No. 46 finished last as a start-and-park entry. Three races later, he failed to make the field at Bristol. In his final attempt of the season, at Richmond, he finished 39th. In 2015, Frahm attempted two races with Jimmy Means Racing as a field-filler. He also made one start in the No. 70 for Derrike Cope Racing. Unsponsored for all three of those races, he completed one race, driving for Cope at Iowa, where he was scored 31st.

Frahm tested with Bryan Dauzat and Brother-In-Law Racing in an ARCA Racing Series car at Daytona International Speedway before the 2018 season, posting a top-ten time the first day.

== Motorsports career results ==
=== NASCAR ===
(key) (Bold – Pole position awarded by qualifying time. Italics – Pole position earned by points standings or practice time. * – Most laps led.)

==== Xfinity Series ====
NASCAR Xfinity Series results
Year	Team	No.	Make	1	2	3	4	5	6	7	8	9	10	11	12	13	14	15	16	17	18	19	20	21	22	23	24	25	26	27	28	29	30	31	32	33	34	NXSC	Pts	Ref
2011	Go Green Racing	39	Ford	DAY	PHO	LVS	BRI	CAL	TEX	TAL	NSH	RCH	DAR	DOV	IOW	CLT	CHI	MCH	ROA	DAY	KEN	NHA; 26	NSH	IRP; 25	IOW	GLN	CGV	BRI	ATL	RCH	CHI	DOV	KAN	CLT	TEX	PHO; 43	HOM	66th	38	
2012	Go Green Racing	39	Ford	DAY	PHO	LVS	BRI	CAL	TEX	RCH; 32	TAL																											57th	61	
2012	Randy Hill Racing	08	Ford									DAR; 28					ROA; 38	KEN	DAY	NHA; 25	CHI	IND	IOW	GLN	CGV	BRI	ATL	RCH	CHI									57th	61	
2012	The Motorsports Group	42	Chevy										IOW; 38	CLT	DOV	MCH														KEN; 42	DOV	CLT	KAN	TEX	PHO	HOM		57th	61	
2014	TriStar Motorsports	44	Toyota	DAY	PHO	LVS	BRI	CAL	TEX	DAR	RCH	TAL	IOW	CLT	DOV	MCH	ROA	KEN	DAY	NHA; 25	CHI	IND																62nd	28	
2014	The Motorsports Group	46	Chevy																				IOW; 40	GLN	MOH	BRI; DNQ	ATL	RCH; 39	CHI	KEN	DOV	KAN	CLT	TEX	PHO	HOM		62nd	28	
2015	Jimmy Means Racing	79	Chevy	DAY	ATL	LVS	PHO	CAL	TEX	BRI	RCH	TAL	IOW	CLT	DOV	MCH	CHI; 39	DAY	KEN	NHA; 35	IND																	75th	13	
2015	Derrike Cope Racing	70	Chevy																			IOW; 31	GLN	MOH	BRI	ROA	DAR	RCH	CHI	KEN	DOV	CLT	KAN	TEX	PHO	HOM		75th	13	

==== K&N Pro Series East ====
NASCAR K&N Pro Series East results
Year	Team	No.	Make	1	2	3	4	5	6	7	8	9	10	NKNPSEC	Pts	Ref
2010	Fred Skaff	33	Ford	GRE	SBO	IOW	MAR; 8	NHA; 29	LRP	LEE	JFC	NHA; 19	DOV	31st	324	
