= JD Squared =

JD Squared, Inc.
- Company type: Private
- Industry: Tube and pipe benders
- Founded: 1982
- Headquarters: Johnson City, Tennessee
- Key people: Robert Hughes, Owner & Chief Engineer
- Website: www.jd2.com

JD Squared, Inc. is an American manufacturer of tube and pipe benders. Founded in 1982 and based in Johnson City, Tennessee, the company has manufactured fabrication tools since 1982, starting with tube and pipe benders and later expanding to other fabrication tools. JD Squared is a privately owned Florida corporation. Robert Hughes is the owner and Chief Engineer.

== History ==
JD Squared, Inc. was founded under the name Hughes Performance Engineering in 1982. In 1983 they designed and released the Model 1 tube bender. The Model 1 Bender became popular because it was one of the few affordable manual tube benders on the fabricating market. However, the Model 1 Bender could only bend 90 degrees. In 1988 JD Squared released the Model 2 Tube bender with 180 degree bend capability. In 1992 the company changed its name to JD Squared, Inc. and released the Model 3 Tube Bender.

== Products ==
Tools currently manufactured by JD Squared include the Model 3 Tube Bender, the Model 4 Tube Bender, Model 32 Bender, Model 54 Rotary Bender, TN-100 Tube Notcher, the Notch Master Tube Notcher, Beast Tube Notcher, Dr. Jig Chassis Jig, and CNC Plasma Tables.

== See also ==
- Tube and pipe benders
