= Uponor =

Finnish company

Uponor Corporation
- Company type: Julkinen osakeyhtiö
- Industry: Building materials
- Founded: 1918; 108 years ago
- Headquarters: Helsinki, Finland
- Key people: Michael Rauterkus (President and CEO), Annika Paasikivi (Chairman)
- Products: HVAC and plumbing systems
- Revenue: ▲€1,386 million (2022)
- Operating income: ▲€135.5 million (2022)
- Owner: Georg Fischer (2023–present)
- Number of employees: ▲4,214 (2022)
- Website: uponorgroup.com

Uponor Oyj is a Finnish company that sells products for drinking water delivery, radiant heating and cooling. With approximately 3,700 employees, its head office is located in Helsinki, Finland.

Based in Finland, the corporation's shares have been listed on the Helsinki Stock Exchange, under the symbol UPONOR, since June 6, 1988. In addition, the group is also listed in the Large Cap segment on Nasdaq Helsinki exchange.

In November 2023, Georg Fischer completed the acquisition of the company for 2.2 billion euros.

== Overview & Business ==
Uponor's business consists of three product groups:

- Indoor climate (heating, cooling, and ventilation) (23%)
- Plumbing (55%)
- Infrastructure (22%)

Uponor's business is divided into three business segments:

- Building Solutions - Europe
- Building Solutions - North America
- Uponor Infra

Uponor's customers include building industry professionals, such as distributors and installers, designers, architects, project developers and other construction sector service providers.

Uponor's indoor climate offering includes integrated radiant heating, cooling and ventilation products. Uponor's portfolio includes water pipes used in buildings, including potable water and radiator connection pipes. Uponor's PEX and composite pipe systems are used for renovation and modernisation projects.

=== Uponor Infra ===
Uponor Infra is the result of a merger between Uponor Infrastructure and KWH Pipe whose products are used in new and rehabilitation infrastructure projects associated with water and wastewater piping, storm-water management, gas distribution, culvert reline and slip lining.

This division has manufacturing units in Europe, developing and manufacturing of structural profile pipe (Weholite) and tanks (Wehopanel) systems for the managing and distribution of water, drainage, energy, electricity, telecommunications and data. Uponor Infra North America was acquired by Wynnchurch Capital in August 2017 and now operates under the name of Infra Pipe Solutions.
