= The Motorsports Group =

Former NASCAR team

Key Motorsports
- Owner: Curtis Key
- Base: Mooresville, North Carolina
- Series: Monster Energy NASCAR Cup Series
- Manufacturer: Chevrolet
- Opened: 1993
- Closed: 2019

Career
- Debut: Monster Energy NASCAR Cup Series: 2015 Folds of Honor QuikTrip 500 (Atlanta); Xfinity Series: 1993 Miller 500 (Martinsville); Camping World Truck Series: 2004 Florida Dodge Dealers 250 (Daytona)
- Latest race: Monster Energy NASCAR Cup Series: 2017 Ford EcoBoost 400 (Homestead); Xfinity Series: 2014 Ford EcoBoost 300 (Homestead); Camping World Truck Series: 2009 North Carolina Education Lottery 200 (Charlotte)
- Races competed: Total: 562; Monster Energy NASCAR Cup Series: 37; Xfinity Series: 439; Camping World Truck Series: 86
- Drivers' Championships: Total: 0 Monster Energy NASCAR Cup Series: 0 Xfinity Series: 0 Camping World Truck Series: 0
- Race victories: Total: 0 Monster Energy NASCAR Cup Series: 0 Xfinity Series: 0 Camping World Truck Series: 0
- Pole positions: Total: 0 Monster Energy NASCAR Cup Series: 0 Xfinity Series: 0 Camping World Truck Series: 0

Key Motorsports (formerly The Motorsports Group and Circle Sport – The Motorsports Group) was an American professional stock car racing team that last competed in the NASCAR Cup Series. The team was founded by Virginia businessman Curtis Key. The team was operated out of Mooresville, North Carolina. The team formerly competed in the NASCAR Xfinity Series and NASCAR Camping World Truck Series. In 2017, longtime team owner Joe Falk joined TMG, bringing his charter and No. 33 to the team, allowing the team to successfully make every race during the season. In December 2017, Circle Sport and TMG parted ways.

On June 21, 2018, The Motorsports Group announced they had changed their team name back to Key Motorsports. Soon afterwards, the team closed up their shop at the beginning of 2019.

== Curtis Key ==
Curtis Key is an American businessman and plumber from Chesapeake, Virginia. Key owns a plumbing business in Chesapeake, Curtis Key Plumbing. He founded Key Motorsports in 1993 when he purchased a team owned by Tommy Ellis. Key Motorsports started out racing in the NASCAR Busch Series between 1993 and 1998. Between that period, Key Motorsports' best finish was a fifth place at Hickory Speedway in Key's first start as team owner, with driver Tommy Ellis. After a few more top tens, in 1998, Key closed the team following a family tragedy. After a decade away from the sport, in 2008, Key rebuilt Key Motorsports, later renaming it to The Motorsports Group in 2012. Between 2008 and 2014, TMG operated as a start and park team.

== Monster Energy NASCAR Cup Series ==
=== Car No. 30 history ===
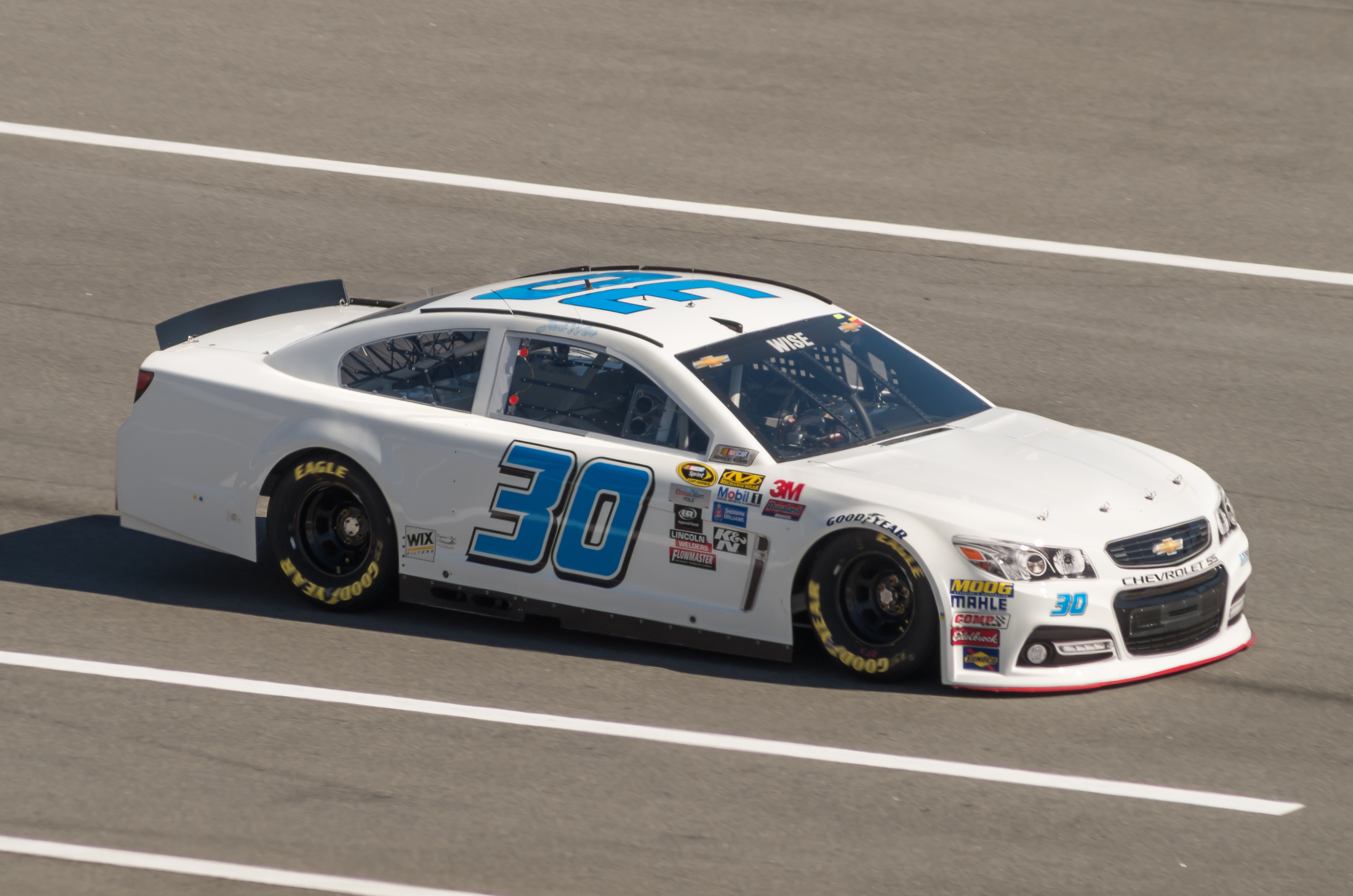
Josh Wise in the No. 30 at Daytona International Speedway in 2016.

On September 15, 2014, the team announced they would begin fielding a full-time entry, the No. 30, in the Sprint Cup Series starting in 2015. On January 21, 2015, it was announced that Ron Hornaday Jr. would be the primary driver of the team's No. 30 car for the 2015 season. In the team's first attempt, Hornaday failed to qualify at the Daytona 500. The following week at Atlanta Motor Speedway, Hornaday made the race, but finished 42nd because of a broken gear after 182 laps. The team chose not to run the "West Coast Swing", enabling them to get better prepared for Martinsville Speedway. Unfortunately, Hornaday wrecked the car during the first round of qualifying at Martinsville and failed to make the race. After failing to qualify at Bristol Motor Speedway, Hornaday left and was replaced with Jeff Green starting at Richmond International Raceway Green drove same numbered 30 from 2001 to 2003. There, Green was able to make the field on speed, starting 33rd and finishing 40th. Green made the Sprint Showdown and finished 19th in a 29-car field. But failed to qualify in the follow weekend for the Coca-Cola 600 at Charlotte Motor Speedway and the FedEx 400 at Dover International Speedway. Green was later released by the team.

They returned to Kentucky with Travis Kvapil as their driver, but failed to qualify due to a rainout. They returned for Bristol as well, but again failed to qualify. They entered Darlington with Kvapil but failed to qualify again. At the September Richmond race, the team hired Josh Wise to run the car, but Wise could only muster 37th place in qualifying and thus missed the race. Kvapil returned at Chicagoland, but another rainout once again sent the team home. Wise was slated to return to New Hampshire, but was placed in BK Racing's No. 26 at the last minute and replaced by Kvapil, who once again failed to qualify. Kvapil was slated to attempt the second Dover race, but due to Hurricane Joaquin, the team chose to withdraw the day before qualifying. The team did not make an attempt for the remainder of 2015. Travis Kvapil left the team after the team temporarily suspended operations until the 2016 season.

Josh Wise rejoined the team in 2016. TMG and Wise announced that they expected to run the full season together. Wise didn't make the Daytona 500, but rebounded the next week, qualifying 38th of a 39-car field at Atlanta. Wise finished 39th after going down 13 laps but made it to the end of the race without any broken equipment. Because only 39 cars attempted the next 3 races, the No. 30 was guaranteed to qualify in Las Vegas, Phoenix, and Fontana with Josh Wise. After a long string of races in which Wise easily qualified the No. 30 TMG car in the races, including at Richmond when more than 40 cars showed up for the first time since Daytona, Wise missed his second race at the 2016 GEICO 500 when he qualified 41st out of a 40-car field. The team then qualified for every race until the Coke Zero 400 when Wise failed to qualify after running 40th of 41, behind the other non-chartered teams. This second streak included Wise managing to qualify at Sonoma, when 41 cars were entered for the first time since Talladega. The team qualified for the next two races, with Wise posting TMG's best finish with a 24th at Kentucky in July; he then missed the 2016 Brickyard 400 after posting the slowest speed of 41 cars in qualifying.

In the week leading up to the 2016 Bojangles' Southern 500, Wise and TMG got a two race sponsorship from Incredible Bank, an online banking system. The sponsor joined TMG after Wise posted a request for sponsorship on Twitter. The sponsorship allowed them to participate in the throwback weekend during the Southern 500 race weekend, with a throwback scheme honoring Dale Earnhardt's 1976 No. 30 Army car. Having failed to make 3 of the superspeedway races (and not entering the fall Talladega race, due to 43 cars entering), TMG didn't field the No. 30 for the 2016 Hellman's 500 but rebounded at Martinsville Speedway, this time with Gray Gaulding as the driver. Gaulding ran two more races at Phoenix and Homestead, failing to qualify at Homestead. Despite rumors that Gaulding would drive the No. 30 for TMG in 2017, plans changed due to the Circle Sport merger and Gaulding was picked up by BK Racing.

In January 2017, it was announced that TMG would partner with Key's lifelong friend Joe Falk and Circle Sport Racing to jointly field the Nos. 30 and 33 Chevrolets in the Monster Energy NASCAR Cup Series. This also meant that CS/TMG would partner with Richard Childress Racing as Falk's team is a satellite team of RCR. The team also formed an alliance with Hendrick Motorsports, who would provide CS/TMG with a pit crew and manager. However the No. 30 car did not run in 2017 as a part-time team even though people were expecting it to run at some point.

For the 2018 season, The Motorsports Group planned to run a No. 30 team, with Eddie Pardue as the crew chief, though the driver wasn't decided. The team never entered a single race in 2018, briefly renamed themselves back to Key Motorsports, and then shut down ahead of 2019.

==== Car No. 30 results ====
Year	Driver	No.	Make	1	2	3	4	5	6	7	8	9	10	11	12	13	14	15	16	17	18	19	20	21	22	23	24	25	26	27	28	29	30	31	32	33	34	35	36	Owners	Pts
2015	Ron Hornaday Jr.	30	Chevy	DAY; DNQ	ATL; 42	LVS	PHO; Wth	CAL	MAR; DNQ	TEX	BRI; DNQ																													49th	6
2015	Jeff Green	30	Chevy									RCH; 40	TAL	KAN	CLT; DNQ	DOV; DNQ	POC	MCH	SON	DAY																				49th	6
2015	Travis Kvapil	30	Chevy																		KEN; DNQ	NHA	IND	POC	GLN	MCH	BRI; DNQ	DAR; DNQ		CHI; DNQ	NHA; DNQ	DOV; Wth	CLT	KAN	TAL	MAR	TEX	PHO	HOM	49th	6
2015	Josh Wise	30	Chevy																										RCH; DNQ											49th	6
2016	Josh Wise	30	Chevy	DAY; DNQ	ATL; 39	LVS; 35	PHO; 34	CAL; 36	MAR; 38	TEX; 40	BRI; 33	RCH; 39	TAL; DNQ	KAN; 36	DOV; 36	CLT; 38	POC; 27	MCH; 30	SON; 38	DAY; DNQ	KEN; 24	NHA; 40	IND; DNQ	POC; 34	GLN; 26	BRI; 36	MCH; 38	DAR; 29	RCH; 30	CHI; 38	NHA; 39	DOV; 39	CLT; 29	KAN; 39	TAL; Wth		TEX; 40			40th	174
2016	Gray Gaulding	30	Chevy																																	MAR; 39		PHO; 37	HOM; DNQ	40th	174

=== Car No. 33 history ===
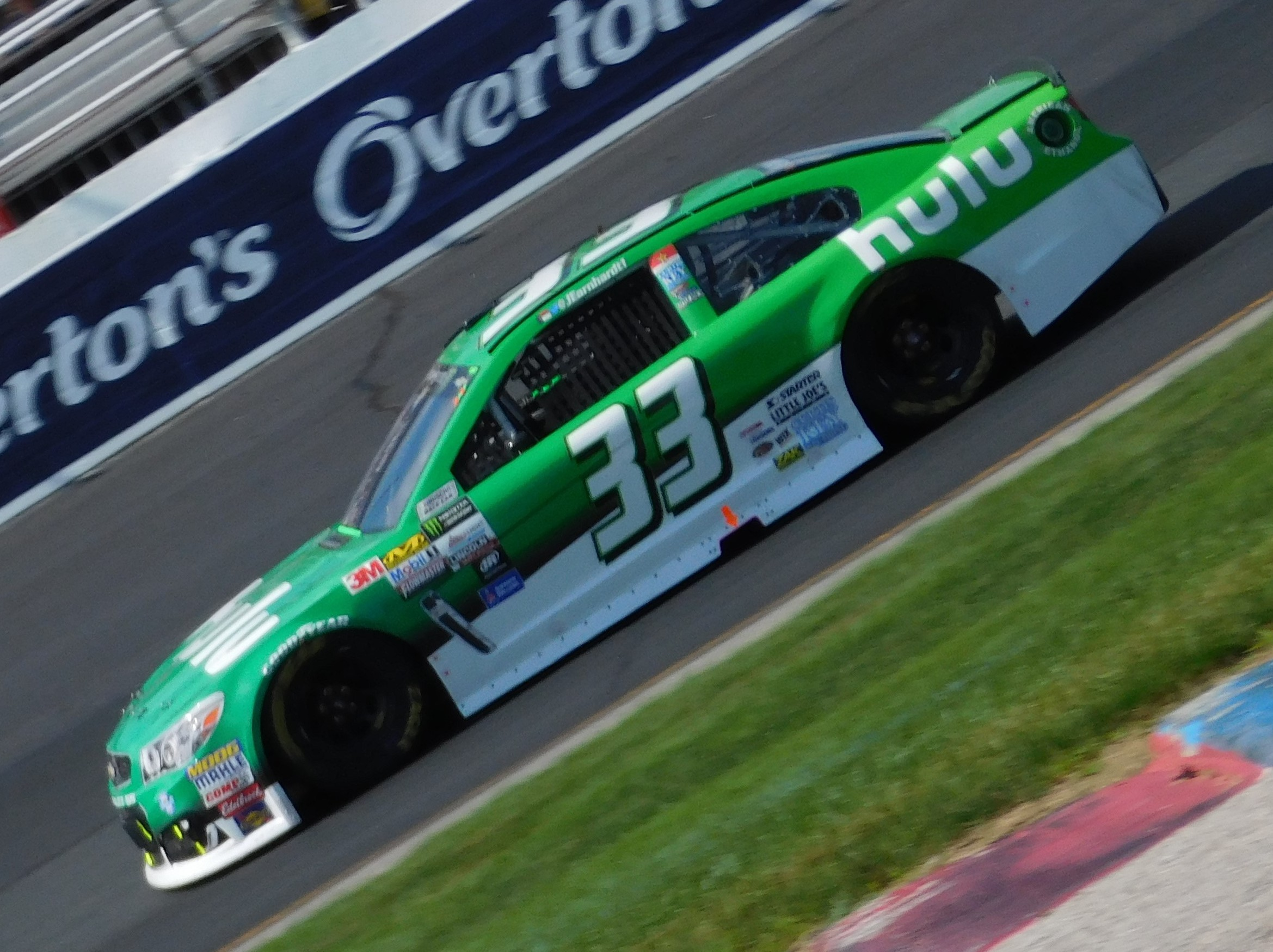
Jeffrey Earnhardt in the No. 33 at New Hampshire Motor Speedway in 2017

On January 6, 2017, it was announced that longtime team owner Joe Falk would partner with Key and field a second car for TMG, bringing a charter and the No. 33 from Circle Sport Racing. It was announced that former TMG crew chief Pat Tryson would return to the team after being released by TMG in 2015.

It was announced on January 31 that Jeffrey Earnhardt would be the driver of the No. 33 Chevrolet for CS/TMG for the Daytona 500. Earnhardt brought sponsor Starter Clothing Line to the team. He finished 26th after being involved in a crash on lap 143. Veteran road course ringer Boris Said was hired to run the two road courses for the team at Sonoma and Watkins Glen. Before the 2017 Toyota/Save Mart 350, CS/TMG, again, released Tryson from the team and replaced him with veteran crew chief Frank Stoddard for specifically, Said's races. For the rest of the season, Eddie Pardue was the crew chief for the No. 33.

At the end of the season, Falk and Circle Sport parted ways with Key and TMG. With the split, this meant that Jeffrey Earnhardt was out of a ride, despite having signed an extension with CSTMG in October 2017.

==== Car No. 33 results ====
Year	Driver	No.	Make	1	2	3	4	5	6	7	8	9	10	11	12	13	14	15	16	17	18	19	20	21	22	23	24	25	26	27	28	29	30	31	32	33	34	35	36	Owners	Pts
2017	Jeffrey Earnhardt	33	Chevy	DAY; 26	ATL; 33	LVS; 32	PHO; 39	CAL; 39	MAR; 36	TEX; 40	BRI; 27	RCH; 35	TAL; 28	KAN; 33	CLT; 40	DOV; 27	POC; 34	MCH; 35		DAY; 37	KEN; 29	NHA; 33	IND; 26	POC; 36		MCH; 35	BRI; 40	DAR; 30	RCH; 34	CHI; 34	NHA; 38	DOV; 37	CLT; 30	TAL; 38	KAN; 26	MAR; 38	TEX; 33	PHO; 29	HOM; 32	37th	160
2017	Boris Said	33	Chevy																SON; 29						GLN; 30															37th	160

== Xfinity Series ==
=== 1993–1998 ===
Key Motorsports was formed after it was purchased from Tommy Ellis in 1993 and debuted at the Miller 500 as the No. 05 Moen Faucets Chevrolet with Roger Sawyer driving. He qualified 14th and finished 22nd. Bobby Hamilton drove three races later at Dover International Speedway, where he finished 29th after suffering handling problems. He ran two additional races for Key later in the season, finishing 17th and 32nd, respectively. Ellis drove for Key in their final race of the year at Hickory Motor Speedway, and finished fifth. Randy MacDonald drove for two consecutive races for Key at the beginning of the following season, his best finish being 21st. Tommy Ellis returned to run a part-time schedule for Key. In nine starts, he had two top-ten finishes but failed to finish the other seven. Tom Peck finished out the season for Key, failing to finish both races due to engine failure.

Key Motorsports made its first race of 1995 at the Hardee's 250 with Steve Boley. They did not run until the fall Richmond race with Chuck Bown driving. After finishing 38th due to an engine failure, Bown finished ninth at the following race at Charlotte before suffering another engine failure at North Carolina Speedway. Bown returned to Key in 1996 at Richmond, where he finished in 31st place. Later in the season, Jeff Burton drove for Key at Charlotte, finishing 42nd with Exide Batteries sponsorship. In 1997, 19-year-old Jimmy Foster was hired to drive the No. 11 Outdoor Channel/Speedvision car, running ten races with a best finish of 16th at New Hampshire. He was released and replaced for a pair of races by Larry Pearson. After the season, a lack of funding coupled with a family tragedy forced Key to close his team.

Key Motorsports reopened in 2008.

==== Car No. 11 results ====
Year	Driver	No.	Make	1	2	3	4	5	6	7	8	9	10	11	12	13	14	15	16	17	18	19	20	21	22	23	24	25	26	27	28	29	30	31	Owners	Pts
1993	Roger Sawyer	05	Chevy	DAY	CAR	RCH	DAR	BRI	HCY	ROU	MAR; 14	NZH	CLT																							
1993	Bobby Hamilton	05	Chevy											DOV; 29	MYB	GLN	MLW	TAL	IRP	MCH	NHA	BRI	DAR	RCH; 21	DOV; 32	ROU	CLT									
1993	Tommy Ellis	05	Chevy																									MAR; DNQ	CAR; DNQ	HCY; 5	ATL					
1994	Randy MacDonald	05	Chevy	DAY	CAR	RCH; 21	ATL; 37																													
1994	Tommy Ellis	05	Chevy					MAR; 10	DAR	HCY; 30	BRI	ROU; 6	NHA	NZH	CLT; 16	DOV; 41	MYB; 34	GLN	MLW	SBO; 28	TAL	HCY	IRP	MCH	BRI	DAR	RCH; 38	DOV; 37	CLT							
1994	Tom Peck	05	Chevy																											MAR; 34	CAR; 33					
1995	Steve Boley	05	Ford	DAY	CAR	RCH; 25	ATL	NSV	DAR	BRI	HCY	NHA	NZH	CLT	DOV	MYB	GLN	MLW	TAL	SBO	IRP	MCH	BRI	DAR												
1995	Chuck Bown	05	Ford																						RCH; 38	DOV	CLT; 9	CAR; 30	HOM							
1996	Chuck Bown	05	Ford	DAY	CAR	RCH; 31	ATL	NSV	DAR	BRI	HCY	NZH																								
1996	Jeff Burton	05	Ford										CLT; 42	DOV	SBO	MYB	GLN	MLW	NHA	TAL	IRP	MCH	BRI	DAR	RCH	DOV	CLT	CAR	HOM							
1997	Jimmy Foster	11	Ford	DAY; DNQ	CAR; 35	RCH; 41	ATL; 30	LVS; 40	DAR; 31	HCY	TEX; 41	BRI	NSV; 22	TAL; 40	NHA; 16	NZH	CLT; 42	DOV	SBO	GLN	MLW															
1997	Larry Pearson	11	Ford																			MYB; 25	GTY	IRP; 31	MCH; DNQ	BRI	DAR	RCH	DOV	CLT	CAL	CAR	HOM			
1998	Kevin Cywinski	11	Ford	DAY	CAR; DNQ	LVS	NSV	DAR	BRI	TEX	HCY	TAL	NHA	NZH	CLT	DOV	RCH; 25	PPR	GLN	MLW	MYB	CAL	SBO	IRP	MCH	BRI	DAR	RCH	DOV	CLT	GTY	CAR	ATL	HOM		

=== Car No. 31 history ===
Key Motorsports returned to the then Nationwide Series in 2008. Jeff Green took the wheel of the No. 31 Chevy for three races with a best finish of 28th.

==== Car No. 31 results ====
Year	Driver	No.	Make	1	2	3	4	5	6	7	8	9	10	11	12	13	14	15	16	17	18	19	20	21	22	23	24	25	26	27	28	29	30	31	32	33	34	35	Owners	Pts
2008	Jeff Green	31	Chevy	DAY	CAL	LVS	ATL	BRI	NSH	TEX	PHO	MXC	TAL	RCH; 38	DAR	CLT	DOV	NSH	KEN	MLW	NHA	DAY	CHI	GTY	IRP	CGV	GLN	MCH	BRI; 28	CAL	RCH	DOV	KAN	CLT; 35	MEM	TEX	PHO	HOM	64th	186

=== Car No. 40 history ===
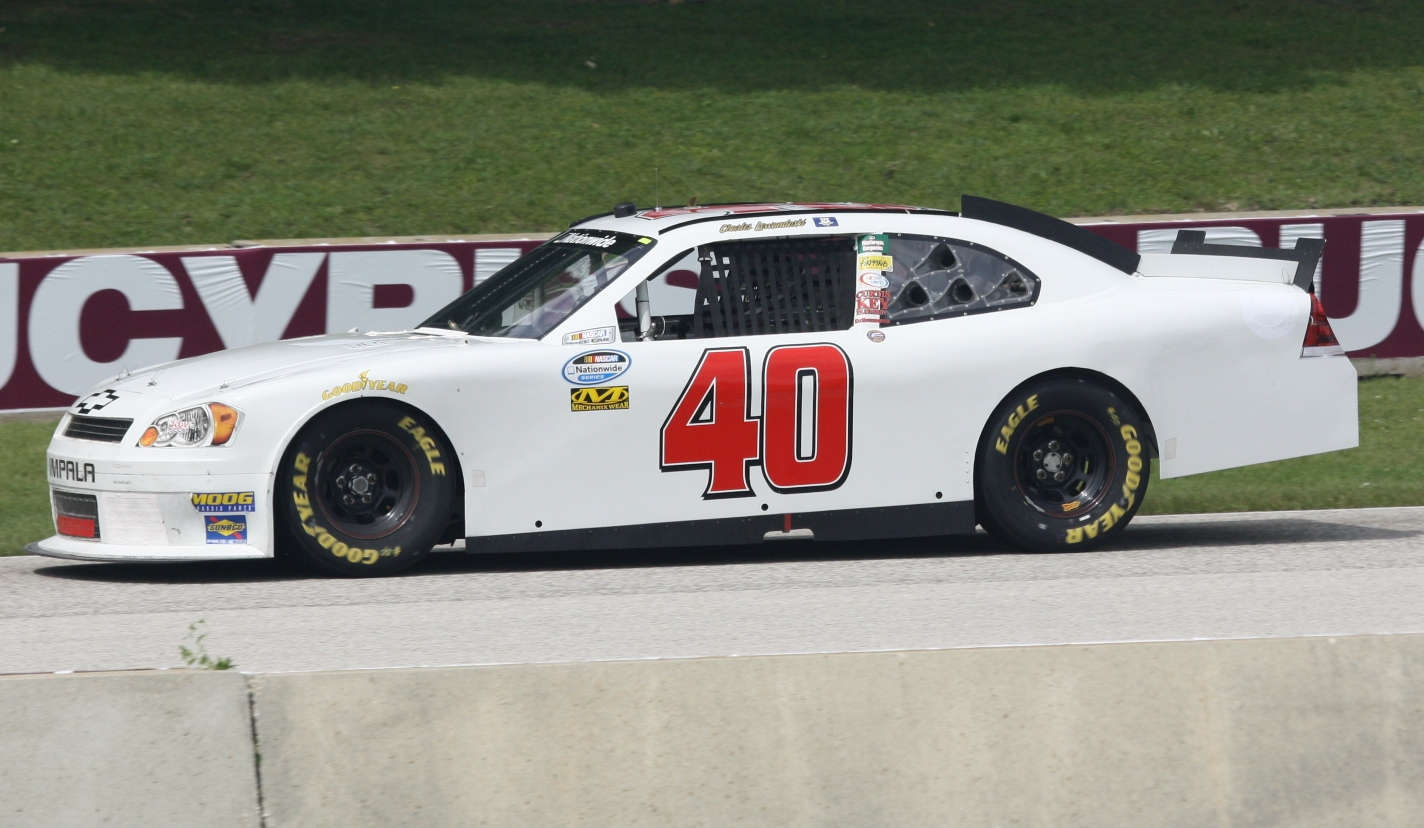
Lewandoski racing the No. 40 in 2011

In 2009, the team changed the number to No. 40 and signed Scott Wimmer as the primary driver. Wimmer ran 24 races for the team with a best finish of seventh in Memphis. During the races Wimmer spent with JR Motorsports, Green, Aric Almirola, Jeffrey Earnhardt, and Bliss drove the car.

For 2010, Bliss signed on as the driver of the car for the 2010 NASCAR Nationwide Series season. Bliss ran 31 races with a best finish of eighth at Bristol. Jeff Green drove four races for the team when Bliss drove for Kevin Harvick Incorporated with a best finish of 20th at Kentucky.

In 2011, Scott Wimmer started with the intention of running full-time for the No. 40 team. After 11 races and the best finish being 12th, Wimmer left since the team began starting and parking. Rookie of the year candidate Charles Lewandoski began driving the No. 40 after Wimmer left. Lewandoski had the best finish being 24th with the team while keeping them in the top 30 in owner's points to remain locked in.

For 2012, Josh Wise drove the car for the first two races before switching to the No. 42, to ensure Erik Darnell ran a full season.

In 2013, Reed Sorenson was scheduled the run the full schedule, but subbed for the injured Michael Annett in the Richard Petty Motorsports No. 43 until his return. Josh Wise ran the car for 5 races. Sorenson departed at season's end, moving to Tommy Baldwin Racing in the Sprint Cup Series.

In 2014, Wise returned to the No. 40, but left at mid-season to focus on his Sprint Cup obligations to Phil Parsons Racing. Matt DiBenedetto, previously driver of the start-and-park No. 46, moved over to the No. 40 at this time, running full races. DiBenedetto left for BK Racing at season's end, and the No. 40 was sold to MBM Motorsports due to the formation of TMG's own Cup team.

==== Car No. 40 results ====
Year	Driver	No.	Make	1	2	3	4	5	6	7	8	9	10	11	12	13	14	15	16	17	18	19	20	21	22	23	24	25	26	27	28	29	30	31	32	33	34	35	Owners	Pts
2009	Scott Wimmer	40	Chevy	DAY; 32	CAL; DNQ	LVS; 11	BRI; 22	TEX; DNQ	NSH; 28	PHO; 19	TAL; DNQ	RCH; 16		CLT; 28	DOV; 18	NSH; 33	KEN; 16		NHA; 17	DAY; 21	CHI; 15	GTY; 15				MCH; 35	BRI; 21		ATL; 18		DOV; 14		CAL; 21	CLT; 25	MEM; 7	TEX; 14	PHO; 15	HOM; 19	21st	3,350
2009	Jeff Green	40	Chevy										DAR; 23																										21st	3,350
2009	Aric Almirola	40	Chevy															MLW; 11					IRP; 14	IOW; 34															21st	3,350
2009	Jeffrey Earnhardt	40	Chevy																						GLN; 24			CGV; 31											21st	3,350
2009	Mike Bliss	40	Chevy																											RCH; 16		KAN; 21							21st	3,350
2010	Mike Bliss	40	Chevy	DAY; 40	CAL; 27	LVS; 27	BRI; 8	NSH; 27	PHO; 38	TEX; 20		RCH; 13	DAR; 32	DOV; 22	CLT; 12			ROA; 31	NHA; 34	DAY; 19	CHI; 18	GTY; 19	IRP; 13	IOW; 17	GLN; 14	MCH; 19	BRI; 17	CGV; 15	ATL; 15	RCH; 40	DOV; 18	KAN; 19	CAL; 9	CLT; 31		TEX; 21	PHO; 12	HOM; 31	21st	3,421
2010	Jeff Green	40	Chevy								TAL; 16					NSH; 24	KEN; 20																		GTY; 25				21st	3,421
2011	Scott Wimmer	40	Chevy	DAY; 35	PHO; 16	LVS; 33	BRI; 22	CAL; 34	TEX; 33	TAL; 12	NSH; 21	RCH; 24	DAR; 38	DOV; 35														BRI; 24											32nd	491
2011	Charles Lewandoski	40	Chevy												IOW; 41	CLT; DNQ	CHI; 24	MCH; 30	ROA; 37	DAY; 40	KEN; 28	NHA; 22			IOW; 22										CLT; 33				32nd	491
2011	Chase Miller	40	Chevy																				NSH; 31																32nd	491
2011	Tim Andrews	40	Chevy																					IRP; 31															32nd	491
2011	Josh Wise	40	Chevy																							GLN; 28	CGV; 29		ATL; 22	RCH; 33	CHI; 31	DOV; 33	KAN; 33	TEX; 36					32nd	491
2011	T. J. Duke	40	Chevy																																	PHO; 23	HOM; 28		32nd	491
2012	Josh Wise	40	Chevy	DAY; 14																																			26th	601
2012	Erik Darnell	40	Chevy		PHO; 26	LVS; 35	BRI; 21	CAL; 24	TEX; 23	RCH; 35	TAL; 14	DAR; 29	IOW; 18	CLT; 27	DOV; 27	MCH; 22	ROA; 23	KEN; 25	DAY; 21	NHA; 40	CHI; 30	IND; 38	IOW; 27		CGV; 16	BRI; 35	ATL; 20	RCH; 18	CHI; 22	KEN; 24	DOV; 31	CLT; 21	KAN; 17	TEX; 25	PHO; 37	HOM; 35			26th	601
2012	J. J. Yeley	40	Chevy																					GLN; 31															26th	601
2013	Reed Sorenson	40	Chevy	DAY; 30	PHO; 18								CLT; 37	DOV; 29	IOW; 15	MCH; 24	ROA; 37	KEN; 22	DAY; 39	NHA; 34	CHI; 30	IND; 28	IOW; 31	GLN; 16	MOH; 36	BRI; 28	ATL; 21	RCH; 27	CHI; 33	KEN; 21									30th	526
2013	Josh Wise	40	Chevy			LVS; 25	BRI; 19	CAL; 20	TEX; 37	RCH; 34	TAL; 18	DAR; 21																											30th	526
2013	T. J. Bell	40	Chevy																												DOV; 28	KAN; 33	CLT; 28	TEX; 32	PHO; 37	HOM; 38			30th	526
2014	Josh Wise	40	Chevy	DAY; 36	PHO; 26	LVS; 37	BRI; 30	CAL; 33	TEX; 31	DAR; 15	RCH; 25	TAL; 26		CLT; 28	DOV; 33	MCH; 26		KEN; 29	DAY; 32	NHA; 38		IND; 29																	27th	544
2014	Matt DiBenedetto	40	Chevy										IOW; 25				ROA; 11				CHI; 34		IOW; 30	GLN; 32	MOH; 13	BRI; 19	ATL; 26	RCH; 26	CHI; 27	KEN; 26	DOV; 30	KAN; 16	CLT; 36	TEX; 31	PHO; 24	HOM; 38			27th	544

=== Car No. 42 history ===
Key Motorsports began fielding the No. 42 at Michigan (race 15) as a third car for Tim Andrews. The team was another start and park operation like the No. 46 and No. 47, helping fund the main car, the No. 40. Erik Darnell drove the car for the first two races until he switched with Josh Wise in order for Wise to run for Cup rookie honors and Darnell a full Nationwide season. Wise was replaced by Matt Frahm at Iowa and Tim Schendel and Road America.

In 2013, the No. 42 team returned with Wise, though J. J. Yeley drove the car until Wise returned from the No. 40. The team shut down after the season, and Wise moved to the No. 40.

==== Car No. 42 results ====
Year	Driver	No.	Make	1	2	3	4	5	6	7	8	9	10	11	12	13	14	15	16	17	18	19	20	21	22	23	24	25	26	27	28	29	30	31	32	33	34	Owners	Pts
2011	Tim Andrews	42	Chevy	DAY	PHO	LVS	BRI	CAL	TEX	TAL	NSH	RCH	DAR	DOV	IOW	CLT	CHI	MCH; 41	ROA; 41	DAY; Wth	KEN; 38	NHA; 41	NSH; 39		IOW; 41	GLN; DNQ		BRI; 39	ATL; 39	RCH; 38	CHI; DNQ	DOV; 40	KAN; DNQ					56th	54
2011	Scott Wimmer	42	Chevy																					IRP; 39														56th	54
2011	Chase Miller	42	Chevy																								CGV; DNQ											56th	54
2011	Erik Darnell	42	Chevy																															CLT; 42	TEX; DNQ			56th	54
2011	Josh Wise	42	Chevy																																	PHO; DNQ		56th	54
2011	Scott Speed	42	Chevy																																		HOM; 41	56th	54
2012	Erik Darnell	42	Chevy	DAY; DNQ																																		44th	141
2012	Josh Wise	42	Chevy		PHO; 40	LVS; 41	BRI; 43	CAL; 39	TEX; 40	RCH; 38	TAL; 40	DAR; 39		CLT; 41	DOV; 37	MCH; 39		KEN; 40	DAY; 41	NHA; 41		IND; 42		GLN; 39		BRI; 40	ATL; 40	RCH; 40	CHI; 41		DOV; 39	CLT; 41	KAN; DNQ	TEX; 42	PHO; 40	HOM; 42		44th	141
2012	Matt Frahm	42	Chevy										IOW; 38																	KEN; 42								44th	141
2012	Tim Schendel	42	Chevy														ROA; 42						IOW; 39															44th	141
2012	Blake Koch	42	Chevy																		CHI; 36				CGV; 41													44th	141
2013	Josh Wise	42	Chevy	DAY	PHO; 38									DOV; 38		MCH; 37	ROA	KEN; 38	DAY	NHA; 38		IND; 39		GLN; 39		BRI; 40	ATL; 39	RCH; 38	CHI; DNQ		DOV; 38	KAN; 39	CLT; DNQ	TEX; 38	PHO; 39	HOM; 39		44th	144
2013	J. J. Yeley	42	Chevy			LVS; QL^{†}	BRI; 38	CAL; 38	TEX; 39	RCH; 39	TAL	DAR; 38	CLT; DNQ																									44th	144
2013	Chase Miller	42	Chevy			LVS; 39																																44th	144
2013	T. J. Bell	42	Chevy												IOW; 37						CHI; 36		IOW; 37		MOH; DNQ					KEN; 38								44th	144
^{†} - Qualified for Chase Miller

=== Car No. 46 history ===
Key Motorsports began fielding the No. 46 at Iowa (race 12) as a second car for Chase Miller. The team is another start and park operation like the No. 42 and No. 47. All three cars help fund the main car, the No. 40. Former Joe Gibbs Racing development driver Matt DiBenedetto drove the car at Dover. In 2013, the No. 46 team and Miller returned. Miller left after the season and DiBenedetto returned again in 2014, then moved to the No. 40 at mid-season. Matt Frahm, Wise, Josh Reaume, and Carl Long all took turns in the car after this, before Ryan Ellis closed out the year in the car. The No. 46 shut down after the season.

==== Car No. 46 results ====
Year	Driver	No.	Make	1	2	3	4	5	6	7	8	9	10	11	12	13	14	15	16	17	18	19	20	21	22	23	24	25	26	27	28	29	30	31	32	33	34	Owners	Pts
2011	Tim Andrews	46	Chevy	DAY	PHO	LVS	BRI	CAL	TEX	TAL	NSH	RCH	DAR	DOV	IOW; 39																							52nd	64
2011	Chase Miller	46	Chevy													CLT; DNQ	CHI; 41	MCH; DNQ	ROA; 40	DAY; DNQ	KEN; 41	NHA; 39		IRP; 41	IOW; 39	GLN; DNQ	CGV	BRI; 40	ATL; 40	RCH; 42	CHI; 40	DOV; 39	KAN; 39	CLT; DNQ	TEX; 39	PHO; 38	HOM; 38	52nd	64
2011	Brett Rowe	46	Chevy																				NSH; DNQ															52nd	64
2012	Chase Miller	46	Chevy	DAY; DNQ	PHO; 41	LVS; 39	BRI; 40	CAL; 38	TEX; 39	RCH; 42	TAL; 41	DAR; 41	IOW; 43	CLT; 40		MCH; 38	ROA; 40	KEN; 39	DAY; 40	NHA; 38	CHI; 40	IND; 41	IOW; 42		CGV; 42	BRI; 43	ATL; 38	RCH; 42	CHI; 42	KEN; 39	DOV; 38	CLT; 37	KAN; 43	TEX; DNQ	PHO; 42	HOM; 41		46th	112
2012	Matt DiBenedetto	46	Chevy												DOV; 42									GLN; 41														46th	112
2013	Chase Miller	46	Chevy	DAY	PHO; 39	LVS; DNQ	BRI; 39	CAL; DNQ	TEX; DNQ	RCH; DNQ	TAL	DAR; 39	CLT																									49th	66
2013	J. J. Yeley	46	Chevy											DOV; 37		MCH; 38	ROA	KEN; 37	DAY	NHA; 39		IND; 37				BRI; 38	ATL	RCH; 40	CHI; 39		DOV; 36	KAN; 38	CLT; DNQ	TEX	PHO	HOM		49th	66
2013	Jason Bowles	46	Chevy												IOW; 39								IOW; 39															49th	66
2013	Tim Schendel	46	Chevy																		CHI; DNQ																	49th	66
2013	T. J. Bell	46	Chevy																					GLN; 38														49th	66
2013	Dexter Stacey	46	Chevy																						MOH; DNQ													49th	66
2013	Matt DiBenedetto	46	Chevy																											KEN; 36								49th	66
2014	Matt DiBenedetto	46	Chevy	DAY	PHO; 38	LVS; 38	BRI; 39	CAL; 37	TEX; 39	DAR; 38	RCH; 37	TAL; 39			DOV; 39	MCH; DNQ		KEN; 40	DAY; DNQ	NHA; 40		IND; 39																44th	129
2014	Ryan Ellis	46	Chevy										IOW; 40	CLT			ROA; 34				CHI; 37								CHI; 39	KEN; 39	DOV; 40	KAN; DNQ	CLT; DNQ	TEX; 40	PHO; DNQ	HOM; DNQ		44th	129
2014	Matt Frahm	46	Chevy																				IOW; 40			BRI; DNQ		RCH; 39										44th	129
2014	Josh Wise	46	Chevy																					GLN; 39														44th	129
2014	Josh Reaume	46	Chevy																						MOH; 38													44th	129
2014	Carl Long	46	Chevy																								ATL; 39											44th	129

=== Car No. 47 history ===
Key Motorsports began fielding the No. 47 at Kentucky (race 18) as a fourth car for Danny Efland and Scott Wimmer. Efland attempted Kentucky, but did not qualify. The team is another start and park operation like the No. 42 and No. 46. All three cars help fund the main car, the No. 40. The No. 47 was shared between Scott Speed and Brian Keselowski for 2011. For 2012, Speed drove the car for most of the races, being replaced by Tim Schendel at Iowa and Matt DiBenedetto at Michigan and Road America. In 2013 the team returned with Scott Riggs and Jason Bowles as drivers. The team attempted Texas, Richmond and Darlington and failed to qualify for all three.

==== Car No. 47 results ====
Year	Driver	No.	Make	1	2	3	4	5	6	7	8	9	10	11	12	13	14	15	16	17	18	19	20	21	22	23	24	25	26	27	28	29	30	31	32	33	34	Owners	Pts
2011	Danny Efland	47	Chevy	DAY	PHO	LVS	BRI	CAL	TEX	TAL	NSH	RCH	DAR	DOV	IOW	CLT	CHI	MCH	ROA	DAY	KEN; DNQ																	62nd	40
2011	Scott Wimmer	47	Chevy																			NHA; 42																62nd	40
2011	Charles Lewandoski	47	Chevy																				NSH; 41	IRP; 40								DOV; 38	KAN; 40					62nd	40
2011	Brian Keselowski	47	Chevy																						IOW; 42	GLN; DNQ	CGV	BRI; 42	ATL; DNQ	RCH; 43	CHI; DNQ							62nd	40
2011	Scott Speed	47	Chevy																															CLT; 41	TEX; 43	PHO; 37		62nd	40
2011	Josh Wise	47	Chevy																																		HOM; 39	62nd	40
2012	Scott Speed	47	Chevy	DAY; DNQ	PHO; 42	LVS; 42	BRI; 41	CAL; 41	TEX; 41	RCH; 40	TAL; 42	DAR; 42		CLT; 42	DOV; 38			KEN; 43																				49th	89
2012	Tim Schendel	47	Chevy										IOW; 42																									49th	89
2012	Matt DiBenedetto	47	Chevy													MCH; 41	ROA; 41						IOW; 41		CGV; 40					KEN; 41								49th	89
2012	Stephen Leicht	47	Chevy																DAY; 42	NHA; 42	CHI; 41	IND; 43		GLN; 42		BRI; DNQ												49th	89
2012	J. J. Yeley	47	Chevy																								ATL; 42	RCH; 41	CHI; 40			CLT; 38	KAN; 40	TEX; 41	PHO; 38	HOM; DNQ		49th	89
2012	T. J. Bell	47	Chevy																												DOV; 41							49th	89
2013	Scott Riggs	47	Chevy	DAY	PHO	LVS	BRI	CAL; 39	TEX; DNQ																													67th	0
2013	Jason Bowles	47	Chevy							RCH; DNQ	TAL	DAR; DNQ	CLT	DOV	IOW	MCH	ROA	KEN	DAY	NHA	CHI	IND	IOW	GLN	MOH	BRI	ATL	RCH	CHI	KEN	DOV	KAN	CLT	TEX	PHO	HOM		67th	0

== Camping World Truck Series ==
=== Truck No. 40 history ===
Key Motorsports returned to NASCAR competition in 2004 starting at the season-opening race at Daytona International Speedway. Joey Clanton drove for the first two races of the season in the No. 40 Optech Chevy, wrecking out of both of them. Tony Raines attempted the fall races at Richmond and Martinsville for Key, but did not qualify. Key did not race in 2005 until the summer Bristol race when Andy Houston drove the truck to a 33rd-place finish after a wreck. Their next attempt at Richmond resulted in a DNQ.

Chad Chaffin attempted the first six races of 2006, finishing eighteenth at Auto Club Speedway, and a 26th-place finish at Gateway. Beginning at the City of Mansfield 250, Dale Earnhardt, Inc. development driver Ryan Moore was named the team's new driver. He had three top-twenty finishes before resigning his position after the New Hampshire race. Tim Fedewa drove at Las Vegas followed by Derrike Cope at Talladega Superspeedway, who ran in the top-ten before becoming involved in a late crash. Shane Huffman finished out three of the final four races of 2006 for Key.

In 2007, Mike Bliss drove the first four races in the 40, posting a tenth-place finish at California. Clay Rogers and Huffman shared the ride for the rest of the half of the season, with Stacy Compton driving at Memphis. Brandon Miller drove for the next five races with Westerman Companies sponsoring, before Chaffin returned to finish out the season in the 40. Chaffin began the 2008 season in the No. 40, but was replaced by Jeff Green and Paul Poulter later in the year. Mike Bliss took over the No. 40 Chevy for ultimately a part-time schedule in 2009.

==== Truck No. 40 results ====
Year	Driver	No.	Make	1	2	3	4	5	6	7	8	9	10	11	12	13	14	15	16	17	18	19	20	21	22	23	24	25	Owners	Pts
2004	Joey Clanton	40	Chevy	DAY; 32	ATL; 31	MAR	MFD	CLT	DOV	TEX	MEM	MLW	KAN	KEN	GTW	MCH	IRP	NSH	BRI										48th	232
2004	Tony Raines	40	Chevy																	RCH; DNQ	NHA	LVS	CAL	TEX	MAR; DNQ	PHO	DAR	HOM	48th	232
2005	Andy Houston	40	Chevy	DAY	CAL	ATL	MAR	GTY	MFD	CLT	DOV	TEX	MCH	MLW	KAN	KEN	MEM	IRP	NSH	BRI; 33	RCH; DNQ	NHA	LVS	MAR	ATL	TEX	PHO	HOM	53rd	104
2006	Chad Chaffin	40	Chevy	DAY; DNQ	CAL; 18	ATL; DNQ	MAR; DNQ	GTY; 26	CLT; DNQ																				32nd	1,920
2006	Ryan Moore	40	Chevy							MFD; 36	DOV; DNQ	TEX; 14	MCH; 27	MLW; 21	KAN; 34	KEN; 32	MEM; 31	IRP; 35	NSH; 18	BRI; 31	NHA; 15								32nd	1,920
2006	Tim Fedewa	40	Chevy																			LVS; 29							32nd	1,920
2006	Derrike Cope	40	Chevy																				TAL; 27		ATL; 28				32nd	1,920
2006	Shane Huffman	40	Chevy																					MAR; 35		TEX; 26	PHO; 28	HOM; 20	32nd	1,920
2007	Mike Bliss	40	Chevy	DAY; 23	CAL; 10	ATL; 25	MAR; 35																						28th	2,376
2007	Clay Rogers	40	Chevy					KAN; 21		MFD; 16		TEX; 25	MCH; 25																28th	2,376
2007	Shane Huffman	40	Chevy						CLT; 24		DOV; 24			MLW; 22															28th	2,376
2007	Stacy Compton	40	Chevy												MEM; 24														28th	2,376
2007	Brandon Miller	40	Chevy													KEN; 19	IRP; 23	NSH; 22	BRI; 25	GTW; 27									28th	2,376
2007	Chad Chaffin	40	Chevy																		NHA; 36	LVS; 16	TAL; 8	MAR; 7	ATL; 36	TEX; 24	PHO; 22	HOM; 30	28th	2,376
2008	Chad Chaffin	40	Chevy	DAY; 36	CAL; 28	ATL; 25	MAR; 22	KAN; 17	CLT; 21	MFD; 19	DOV; 21	TEX; 25	MCH; 27		MEM; 23	KEN; 23	IRP; 13											HOM; 28	26th	2,311
2008	Paul Poulter	40	Chevy											MLW; 30							NHA; 25								26th	2,311
2008	Jeff Green	40	Chevy															NSH; 26	BRI; 27	GTW; 18		LVS; 7	TAL; 21	MAR; 31	ATL; 23	TEX; 24			26th	2,311
2008	Mike Bliss	40	Chevy																								PHO; 31		26th	2,311
2009	Mike Bliss	40	Chevy	DAY; 33	CAL; 18	ATL; 8	MAR; 15	KAN	CLT; 27	DOV	TEX	MCH	MLW	MEM	KEN	IRP	NSH	BRI	CHI	IOW	GTY	NHA	LVS	MAR	TAL	TEX	PHO	HOM	42nd	515

=== Truck No. 44 history ===
In 2007, Key debuted a new second truck, numbered 44 to run alongside the primary number 40. At Daytona, the truck was driven by Larry Foyt, who finished 32nd after an early accident. Morgan Shepherd piloted the truck for the next two races Auto Club and Atlanta, start and parking both times finishing 34th and 33rd, respectively. Frank Kreyer drove the truck at Martinsville, and drove again two races later at Mansfield with sponsorship from Culver's. Kreyer finished 28th at Martinsville, and 34th at Mansfield after engine problems. The team returned for one race in a start and park role in 2008 with Shepherd at Auto Club finishing 34th. The team returned in 2009, with the crew chief of the 40 truck, Lance Hooper, behind the wheel. Hooper raced the opening two races, finishing 35th at Daytona, and 36th at Auto Club in a start and park role.

==== Truck No. 44 results ====
Year	Driver	No.	Make	1	2	3	4	5	6	7	8	9	10	11	12	13	14	15	16	17	18	19	20	21	22	23	24	25	Owners	Pts
2007	Larry Foyt	44	Chevy	DAY; 32																									41st	332
2007	Morgan Shepherd	44	Chevy		CAL; 34	ATL; 33																							41st	332
2007	Frank Kreyer	44	Chevy				MAR; 28	KAN	CLT	MFD; 34	DOV	TEX	MCH	MLW	MEM	KEN	IRP	NSH	BRI	GTW	NHA	LVS	TAL	MAR	ATL	TEX	PHO	HOM	41st	332
2008	Morgan Shepherd	44	Chevy	DAY	CAL; 34	ATL	MAR	KAN	CLT	MFD	DOV	TEX	MCH	MLW	MEM	KEN	IRP	NSH	BRI	GTY	NHA	LVS	TAL	MAR	ATL	TEX	PHO	HOM	63rd	0
2009	Lance Hooper	44	Chevy	DAY; 35	CAL; 36	ATL	MAR	KAN	CLT	DOV	TEX	MCH	MLW	MEM	KEN	IRP	NSH	BRI	CHI	IOW	GTW	NHA	LVS	MAR	TAL	TEX	PHO	HOM	66th	113
