= Chase Miller =

American racing driver and mechanic (born 1987)

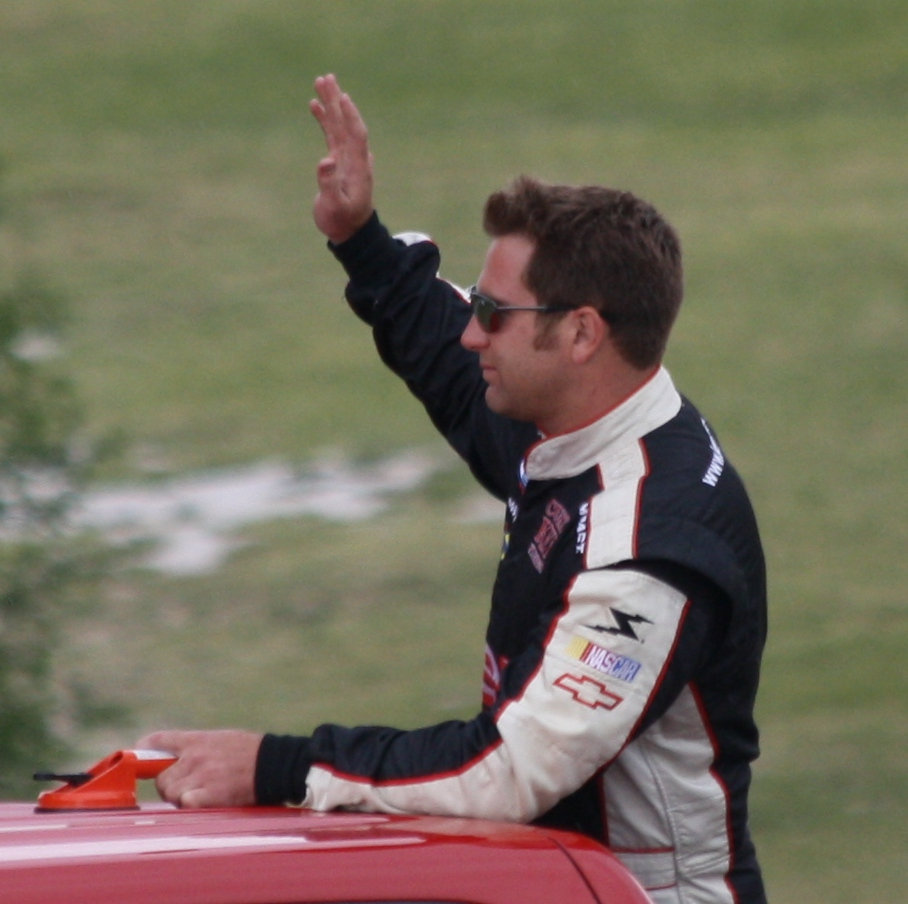
- Miller at Road America in 2012
- Born: January 28, 1987 (age 39); Canton, Georgia, U.S.

NASCAR O'Reilly Auto Parts Series career
- 96 races run over 7 years
- 2013 position: 61st
- Best finish: 38th (2008)
- First race: 2007 Federated Auto Parts 300 (Nashville)
- Last race: 2013 5-hour Energy 200 (Dover)
Wins	Top tens	Poles
0	2	0

NASCAR FedEx Freight Truck Series career
- 13 races run over 2 years
- Best finish: 38th (2006)
- First race: 2006 Sylvania 200 (Loudon)
- Last race: 2007 O'Reilly Auto Parts 250 (Kansas)
Wins	Top tens	Poles
0	1	0
- Statistics up to date as of November 16, 2013.

Eldon Chase Miller (born January 28, 1987) is an American former stock car racing driver, who last competed in the NASCAR Nationwide Series (now the Xfinity Series) in 2013. He currently works for Front Row Motorsports as a mechanic.

== Racing career ==
=== 2005–2008: Dodge development driver ===
Miller joined the ARCA Re/Max Series in 2005 at age 18 as a driver in Dodge's driver development program, He made his debut at Nashville driving the Bobby Jones Racing No. 88 car, where he ran in the top-five for a part of the race before running out of gas. Then, at Gateway, Miller led multiple laps before falling out due to transmission trouble. In 2006, Miller was tapped by Dodge to drive for the larger Cunningham Motorsports team in their No. 4 in six ARCA races that year. After an 11th-place finish at Nashville, Miller charged to the win at Pocono. He set the record as the youngest driver to ever win an ARCA race at Pocono to that point. He then backed up his win with a dominating performance at the second annual ARCA Pocono event before a cylinder failure took him from the lead, with only eight laps remaining, and forced him to a fifth-place finish. He also qualified on the pole at Gateway and was leading the race when more mechanical problems plagued him. His outstanding performance won him the opportunity to compete in the Craftsman Truck Series with the Dodge Development Team.

Miller joined up with Bobby Hamilton Racing to drive their No. 4 truck near the end of the 2006 season, also as a part of the Dodge driver development program. In only his fourth start, Miller scored a top ten at Martinsville Speedway. He earned the ride for the full season in 2007. However, after five races, Miller and BHR parted ways. He was soon hired by Ray Evernham to drive a part-time schedule in his Busch Series team's No. 9 car. In only his second career start, Miller scored a second-place qualifying effort at Kentucky Speedway, and a best finish of fifteenth at Gateway. In 2008, he ran twelve races in the No. 9 car once again, with sponsorship from Unilever and Verizon Wireless, as well as two additional races in the No. 19 car for Evernham. He had two top-ten finishes and finished 38th in points in a part-time schedule.

=== 2009–2013: Start and park career ===
Gillett Evernham closed their Nationwide Series team at the end of the year after the team's merger with Petty Enterprises, and Miller spent the first few months of the 2009 season without a ride, before he drove most of the second half of the season, going back and forth between the No. 91 MSRP Motorsports Chevrolet and the JTG Daugherty Racing No. 47 Toyota. He also ran one race at Memphis in Derrike Cope's No. 73. For 2010, Miller filled in for David Gilliland in the standalone races in the No. 91 for D'Hondt-Humphrey Motorsports (formerly MSRP). He also drove a few races for other teams that year as well, which were Specialty Racing in the No. 61 and MacDonald Motorsports in the No. 82. All three rides were start and park entries.

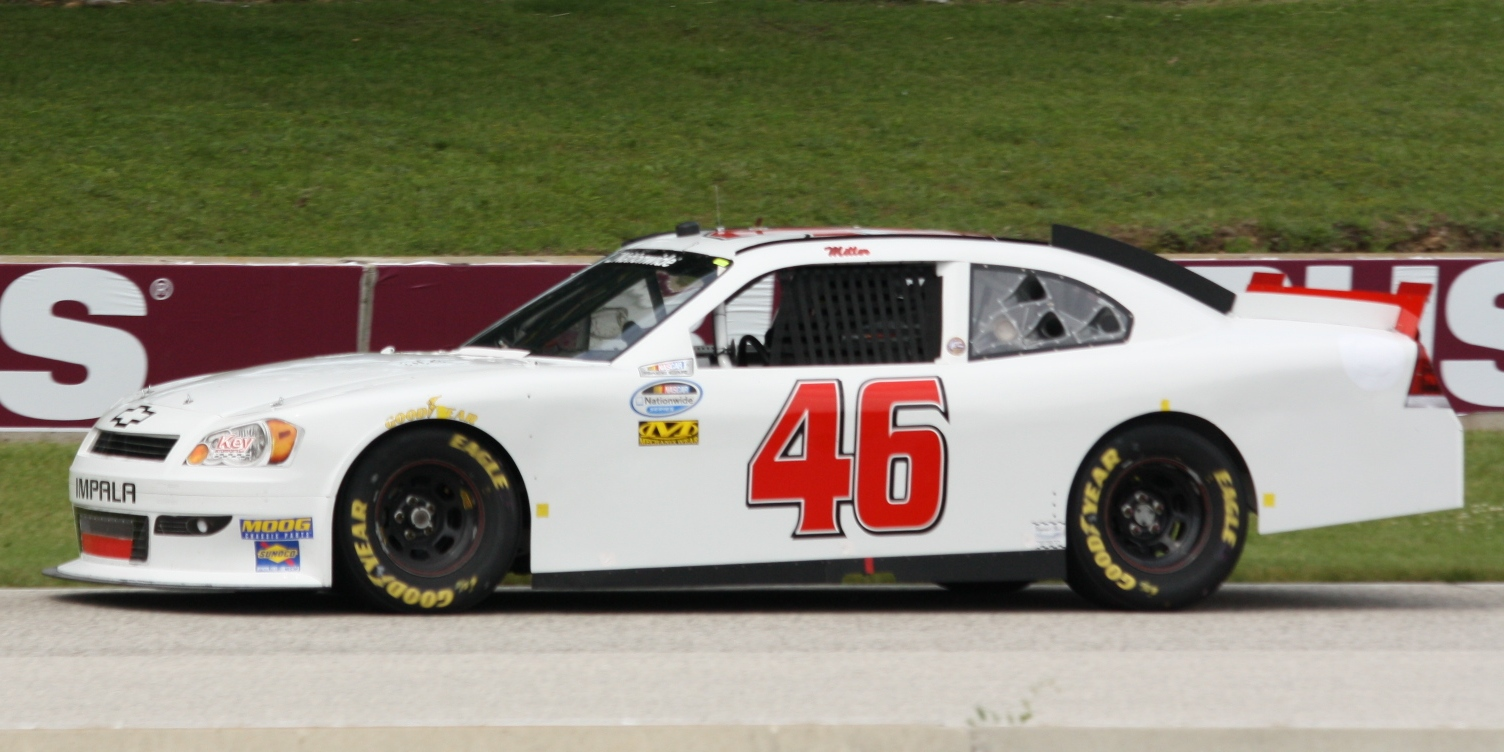
Miller's No. 46 in 2011

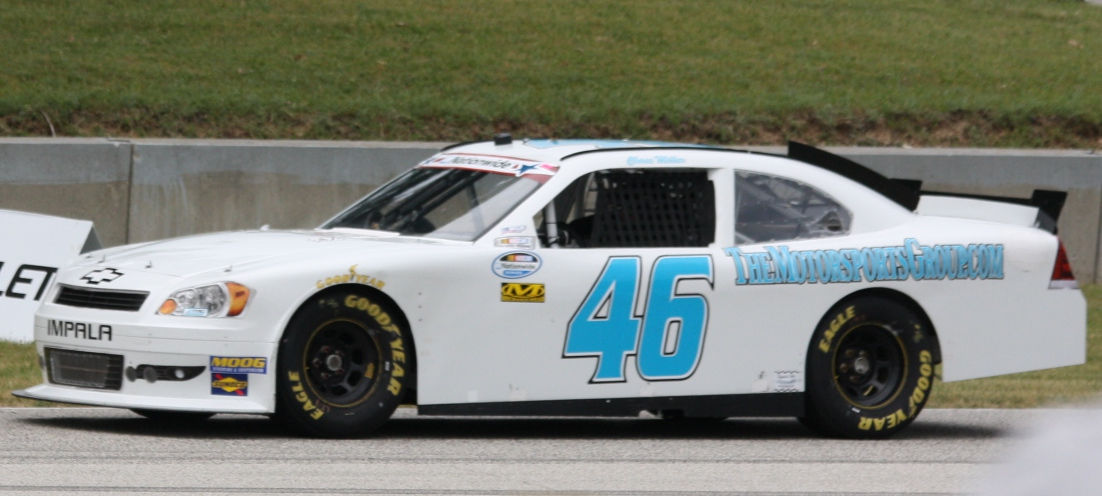
Miller's No. 46 in 2012

After running one race for Fleur-de-lis Motorsports in their No. 68, Miller found a solid ride about a third of the way into the 2011 season, driving the start-and-park No. 46 for Key Motorsports. He entered every race for the rest of the year starting at Iowa in May. He moved to two of Key's other cars for two races, with him in the No. 40 for Nashville and in the No. 42 for Montreal. In 2012, Miller drove for The Motorsports Group in the No. 46, start-and-parking for most of the season. At the start of 2013, he returned to start-and-park the TMG No. 46 for select races, but then left for TriStar Motorsports during the year, starting-and-parking in the team's No. 10 and No. 91 cars as well as in the No. 15 car for Rick Ware Racing.

=== 2014–present: Crew member career ===
2013 was the last time that Miller was a driver. However, he remained employed at TriStar as a car chief for their No. 14 car of Eric McClure and Cale Conley and later a mechanic and crew chief for the team. According to his LinkedIn profile, in May 2015, he became TriStar's shop foreman, and after TriStar's Nationwide/Xfinity team was shut down in 2017, Miller joined Front Row Motorsports, where he currently works as a wiring mechanic.

== Personal life ==
Miller graduated from Sequoyah High School.. Also according to his LinkedIn, he is a graduate of Mitchell Community College.

== Motorsports career results ==
=== NASCAR ===
(key) (Bold – Pole position awarded by qualifying time. Italics – Pole position earned by points standings or practice time. * – Most laps led.)

==== Nationwide Series ====
NASCAR Nationwide Series results
Year	Team	No.	Make	1	2	3	4	5	6	7	8	9	10	11	12	13	14	15	16	17	18	19	20	21	22	23	24	25	26	27	28	29	30	31	32	33	34	35	NNSC	Pts	Ref
2007	Evernham Motorsports	9	Dodge	DAY	CAL	MXC	LVS	ATL	BRI	NSH	TEX	PHO	TAL	RCH	DAR	CLT	DOV	NSH; 22	KEN; 18	MLW; 17	NHA	DAY	CHI	GTY; 15	IRP	CGV	GLN	MCH	BRI	CAL	RCH								63rd	642	
2007	Gillett Evernham Motorsports	9	Dodge																													DOV; 16	KAN	CLT	MEM; 24	TEX	PHO	HOM	63rd	642	
2008	Gillett Evernham Motorsports	9	Dodge	DAY	CAL	LVS	ATL	BRI	NSH; 14	TEX	PHO; 21	MXC	TAL	RCH	DAR; 8			NSH; 11	KEN; 39	MLW; 23	NHA	DAY	CHI	GTY; 13	IRP; 30	CGV	GLN	MCH	BRI	CAL; 23	RCH	DOV	KAN		MEM; 6	TEX; 23	PHO	HOM; 20	38th	1386	
2008	Gillett Evernham Motorsports	19	Dodge													CLT; 36	DOV																	CLT; 36					38th	1386	
2009	MSRP Motorsports	91	Chevy	DAY	CAL	LVS	BRI	TEX	NSH	PHO	TAL	RCH	DAR	CLT	DOV	NSH	KEN	MLW	NHA	DAY	CHI	GTY; 42	IRP	IOW; 40	GLN						DOV; 39								74th	442	
2009	JTG Daugherty Racing	47	Toyota																							MCH; 37	BRI	CGV	ATL; 39	RCH		KAN; QL^{†}	CAL; 43	CLT; 41		TEX; 39	PHO	HOM; 37	74th	442	
2009	Derrike Cope Inc.	73	Dodge																																MEM; 39				74th	442	
2010	D'Hondt Humphrey Motorsports	91	Chevy	DAY	CAL	LVS	BRI	NSH; DNQ	PHO	TEX	TAL	RCH	DAR			NSH; 39	KEN; 39	ROA	NHA	DAY	CHI	GTY; 36	IRP; 37	IOW; 41					ATL; 37	RCH	DOV	KAN			GTY; 36				71st	478	
2010	D'Hondt Humphrey Motorsports	90	Chevy											DOV; 40	CLT												BRI; 40	CGV											71st	478	
2010	Specialty Racing	61	Ford																						GLN; 39	MCH													71st	478	
2010	MacDonald Motorsports	82	Dodge																														CAL; 41	CLT		TEX; DNQ	PHO; DNQ	HOM	71st	478	
2011	Fleur-de-lis Motorsports	68	Chevy	DAY	PHO	LVS	BRI	CAL	TEX	TAL	NSH	RCH	DAR	DOV	IOW; 40																								46th	81	
2011	Key Motorsports	46	Chevy													CLT; DNQ	CHI; 41	MCH; DNQ	ROA; 40	DAY; DNQ	KEN; 41	NHA; 39		IRP; 41	IOW; 39	GLN; DNQ		BRI; 40	ATL; 40	RCH; 42	CHI; 40	DOV; 39	KAN; 39	CLT; DNQ	TEX; 39	PHO; 38	HOM; 38		46th	81	
2011	Key Motorsports	40	Chevy																				NSH; 31																46th	81	
2011	Key Motorsports	42	Chevy																								CGV; DNQ												46th	81	
2012	The Motorsports Group	46	Chevy	DAY; DNQ	PHO; 41	LVS; 39	BRI; 40	CAL; 38	TEX; 39	RCH; 42	TAL; 41	DAR; 41	IOW; 43	CLT; 40	DOV	MCH; 38	ROA; 40	KEN; 39	DAY; 40	NHA; 38	CHI; 40	IND; 41	IOW; 42	GLN	CGV; 42	BRI; 43	ATL; 38	RCH; 42	CHI; 42	KEN; 39	DOV; 38	CLT; 37	KAN; 43	TEX; DNQ	PHO; 42	HOM; 41			44th	107	
2013	The Motorsports Group	46	Chevy	DAY	PHO; 39	LVS; DNQ	BRI; 39	CAL; DNQ	TEX; DNQ	RCH; DNQ	TAL	DAR; 39	CLT	DOV	IOW	MCH	ROA	KEN	DAY	NHA	CHI	IND	IOW	GLN															61st	48	
2013	The Motorsports Group	42	Chevy			LVS; 39																																	61st	48	
2013	TriStar Motorsports	10	Toyota																						MOH; 39		ATL; 38	RCH; 39	CHI	KEN									61st	48	
2013	TriStar Motorsports	91	Toyota																							BRI; 39													61st	48	
2013	Rick Ware Racing	15	Chevy																												DOV; 37	KAN; DNQ	CLT	TEX	PHO	HOM			61st	48	
^{†} - Qualified but replaced by Michael McDowell

^{*} Season still in progress
^{1} Ineligible for series points

==== Craftsman Truck Series ====
NASCAR Craftsman Truck Series results
Year	Team	No.	Make	1	2	3	4	5	6	7	8	9	10	11	12	13	14	15	16	17	18	19	20	21	22	23	24	25	NCTC	Pts	Ref
2006	Bobby Hamilton Racing	4	Dodge	DAY	CAL	ATL	MAR	GTY	CLT	MFD	DOV	TEX	MCH	MLW	KAN	KEN	MEM	IRP	NSH	BRI	NHA; 17	LVS; 32	TAL; 21	MAR; 10	ATL; 33	TEX; 30	PHO; 35	HOM; 32	38th	675	
2007	Bobby Hamilton Racing	4	Dodge	DAY; 22	CAL; 14	ATL; 34	MAR; 32	KAN; 19	CLT	MFD	DOV	TEX	MCH	MLW	MEM	KEN	IRP	NSH	BRI	GTW	NHA	LVS	TAL	MAR	ATL	TEX	PHO	HOM	47th	452	

==== K&N Pro Series West ====
NASCAR K&N Pro Series West results
Year	Team	No.	Make	1	2	3	4	5	6	7	8	9	10	11	12	13	14	15	NKNPSWC	Pts	Ref
2012	Bob Wood	14	Ford	PHO	LHR	MMP	S99	IOW	BIR	LVS	SON	EVG	CNS	IOW; DNQ	PIR	SMP	AAS	PHO	68th	29	

=== ARCA Re/Max Series ===
(key) (Bold – Pole position awarded by qualifying time. Italics – Pole position earned by points standings or practice time. * – Most laps led.)

ARCA Re/Max Series results
Year	Team	No.	Make	1	2	3	4	5	6	7	8	9	10	11	12	13	14	15	16	17	18	19	20	21	22	23	ARMC	Pts	Ref
2005	Bobby Jones Racing	88	Dodge	DAY	NSH; 26	SLM	KEN	TOL; DNQ	LAN	MIL	POC	MCH	KAN	KEN	BLN	POC	GTW; 23	LER	NSH	MCH; 16	ISF	TOL	DSF	CHI	SLM	TAL	76th	395	
2006	Cunningham Motorsports	4	Dodge	DAY	NSH; 11	SLM	WIN	KEN	TOL	POC; 1	MCH	KAN	KEN	BLN	POC; 5*	**GTW**; 33	NSH	MCH	ISF	MIL; 12	TOL	DSF	CHI	SLM			38th	1095	
2006	Eddie Sharp Racing	22	Dodge																						TAL; 9	IOW	38th	1095	
2008	Gillett Evernham Motorsports	9	Dodge	DAY	SLM	IOW	KAN	CAR	KEN	TOL	POC	MCH	CAY	KEN	BLN	POC; 3	NSH	ISF	DSF	CHI	SLM	NJE	TAL	TOL			90th	215	
2009	Cunningham Motorsports	4	Dodge	DAY	SLM	CAR	TAL	KEN	TOL	POC; 16	MCH; 3	MFD	IOW	KEN	BLN	POC	ISF	CHI	TOL	DSF	NJE	SLM	KAN	CAR			72nd	365	
