= 2016 Pennsylvania 400 =

Race details
- Race 21 of 36 in the 2016 NASCAR Sprint Cup Series
- The 2016 Pennsylvania 400 program cover, featuring Tony Stewart.
- Date: August 1, 2016 (Note: Due to rain, the race was postponed from July 31, 2016.)
- Location: Pocono Raceway in Long Pond, Pennsylvania
- Course: Permanent racing facility
- Course length: 2.5 miles (4.023 km)
- Distance: 138 laps, 345 mi (555.224 km)
- Scheduled distance: 160 laps, 400 mi (643.738 km)
- Average speed: 127.581 miles per hour (205.322 km/h)

Pole position
| Driver | Martin Truex Jr. | Furniture Row Racing |
- Time: 50.211

Most laps led
| Driver | Joey Logano | Team Penske |
- Laps: 38

Winner
| No. 34 | Chris Buescher | Front Row Motorsports |

Television in the United States
- Network: NBCSN
- Announcers: Rick Allen, Jeff Burton and Steve Letarte

Radio in the United States
- Radio: MRN
- Booth announcers: Joe Moore, Jeff Striegle and Rusty Wallace
- Turn announcers: Dave Moody (1), Mike Bagley (2) and Kyle Rickey (3)

The 2016 Pennsylvania 400 was a NASCAR Sprint Cup Series stock car race that was held on August 1, 2016, at Pocono Raceway in Long Pond, Pennsylvania. Having been delayed from July 31 due to rain, the race – the 21st race of the 2016 NASCAR Sprint Cup Series – was also shortened due to fog, with only 138 out of the scheduled 160 laps of the 2.5-mile (4.0-kilometre) speedway being completed.

At the race's early conclusion, rookie Chris Buescher took his first Cup Series victory and the first win for Front Row Motorsports since 2013. The race had 19 lead changes among different drivers, 7 cautions for 31 laps, and a red flag period.

== Entry list ==
The preliminary entry list for the race included 41 cars and was released on July 25, 2016 at 2:55 p.m. Eastern time.

| No. | Driver | Team | Manufacturer |
|---|---|---|---|
| 1 | Jamie McMurray | Chip Ganassi Racing | Chevrolet |
| 2 | Brad Keselowski | Team Penske | Ford |
| 3 | Austin Dillon | Richard Childress Racing | Chevrolet |
| 4 | Kevin Harvick | Stewart–Haas Racing | Chevrolet |
| 5 | Kasey Kahne | Hendrick Motorsports | Chevrolet |
| 6 | Trevor Bayne | Roush Fenway Racing | Ford |
| 7 | Regan Smith | Tommy Baldwin Racing | Chevrolet |
| 10 | Danica Patrick | Stewart–Haas Racing | Chevrolet |
| 11 | Denny Hamlin | Joe Gibbs Racing | Toyota |
| 13 | Casey Mears | Germain Racing | Chevrolet |
| 14 | Tony Stewart | Stewart–Haas Racing | Chevrolet |
| 15 | Clint Bowyer | HScott Motorsports | Chevrolet |
| 16 | Greg Biffle | Roush Fenway Racing | Ford |
| 17 | Ricky Stenhouse Jr. | Roush Fenway Racing | Ford |
| 18 | Kyle Busch | Joe Gibbs Racing | Toyota |
| 19 | Carl Edwards | Joe Gibbs Racing | Toyota |
| 20 | Matt Kenseth | Joe Gibbs Racing | Toyota |
| 21 | Ryan Blaney (R) | Wood Brothers Racing | Ford |
| 22 | Joey Logano | Team Penske | Ford |
| 23 | David Ragan | BK Racing | Toyota |
| 24 | Chase Elliott (R) | Hendrick Motorsports | Chevrolet |
| 27 | Paul Menard | Richard Childress Racing | Chevrolet |
| 30 | Josh Wise | The Motorsports Group | Chevrolet |
| 31 | Ryan Newman | Richard Childress Racing | Chevrolet |
| 32 | Jeb Burton (i) | Go FAS Racing | Ford |
| 34 | Chris Buescher (R) | Front Row Motorsports | Ford |
| 38 | Landon Cassill | Front Row Motorsports | Ford |
| 41 | Kurt Busch | Stewart–Haas Racing | Chevrolet |
| 42 | Kyle Larson | Chip Ganassi Racing | Chevrolet |
| 43 | Aric Almirola | Richard Petty Motorsports | Ford |
| 44 | Brian Scott (R) | Richard Petty Motorsports | Ford |
| 46 | Michael Annett | HScott Motorsports | Chevrolet |
| 47 | A. J. Allmendinger | JTG Daugherty Racing | Chevrolet |
| 48 | Jimmie Johnson | Hendrick Motorsports | Chevrolet |
| 55 | Reed Sorenson | Premium Motorsports | Chevrolet |
| 78 | Martin Truex Jr. | Furniture Row Racing | Toyota |
| 83 | Matt DiBenedetto | BK Racing | Toyota |
| 88 | Jeff Gordon | Hendrick Motorsports | Chevrolet |
| 95 | Michael McDowell | Circle Sport – Leavine Family Racing | Chevrolet |
| 98 | Cole Whitt | Premium Motorsports | Chevrolet |
Official entry list

== Practice ==
=== First practice ===
Paul Menard was the fastest in the first practice session with a time of 50.722 and a speed of 177.438 mph (285.559 km/h).

| Pos | No. | Driver | Team | Manufacturer | Time | Speed |
|---|---|---|---|---|---|---|
| 1 | 27 | Paul Menard | Richard Childress Racing | Chevrolet | 50.722 | 177.438 |
| 2 | 11 | Denny Hamlin | Joe Gibbs Racing | Toyota | 50.731 | 177.406 |
| 3 | 18 | Kyle Busch | Joe Gibbs Racing | Toyota | 50.842 | 177.019 |
Official first practice results

=== Final practice ===
Martin Truex Jr. was the fastest in the final practice session with a time of 51.027 and a speed of 176.377 mph (283.851 km/h).

| Pos | No. | Driver | Team | Manufacturer | Time | Speed |
|---|---|---|---|---|---|---|
| 1 | 78 | Martin Truex Jr. | Furniture Row Racing | Toyota | 51.027 | 176.377 |
| 2 | 2 | Brad Keselowski | Team Penske | Ford | 51.097 | 176.136 |
| 3 | 4 | Kevin Harvick | Stewart–Haas Racing | Chevrolet | 51.133 | 176.012 |
Official final practice results

== Qualifying ==
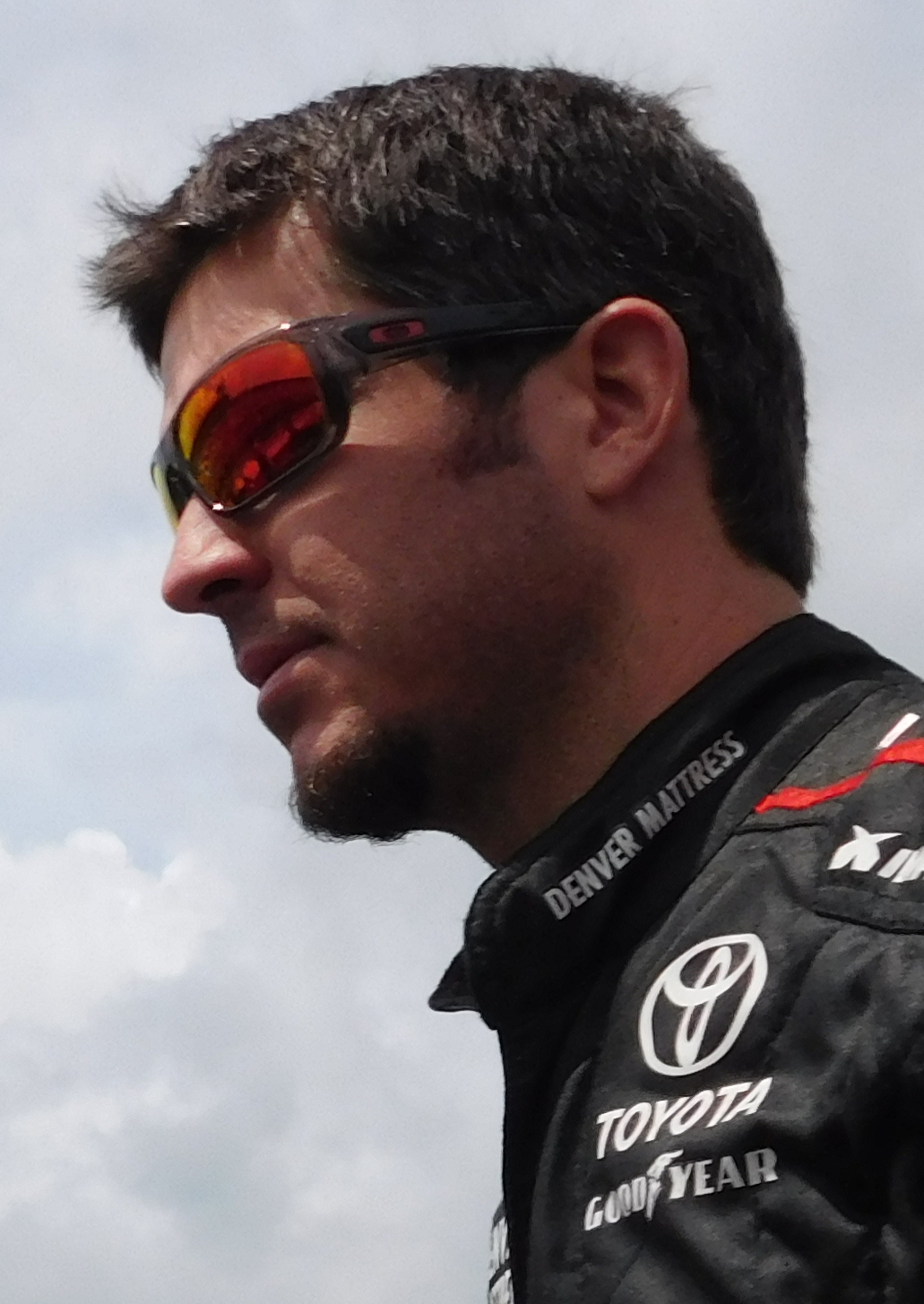
Martin Truex Jr. scored the pole position.

Martin Truex Jr. scored the pole with a time of 50.211 and a speed of 179.244 mph (288.465 km/h). “The car felt really good for me today,” Truex said. “We’ve obviously got speed now we’ll use the rest of the weekend to fine tune some things and get ready for Sunday. Love this track and looking forward to having some fun on Sunday and trying to get to Victory Lane.”

Carl Edwards, who qualified second, said as he "crossed the line, I felt like, 'That’s it.' But after seeing what (Truex) ran, I thought 'Well, maybe I could go back and change this or that,' but that was a really good lap for me. It just was. You can always go back and pick your lap apart, but the last two weeks, Indy and here, I was pretty proud of my lap, and they just got us."

Paul Menard, who qualified third, said ''we are not where we expected to be and need to be in points, so we had to make a change. Danny (Stockman) came in here and gave us a good car right off the truck. We stuck in qualifying trim all day. We know we have to improve our qualifying that just starts your race off way better. A good way to start it off.”

Qualifying was delayed 20 minutes due to a "glitch" with the laser inspection station. “We had a little bit of a glitch this morning at the opening of inspection with our laser platform,” Scott Miller, NASCAR's senior vice president of competition and racing development, told NBCSN. “We got it rectified quickly.”

=== Qualifying results ===
| Pos | No. | Driver | Team | Manufacturer | R1 | R2 | R3 |
|---|---|---|---|---|---|---|---|
| 1 | 78 | Martin Truex Jr. | Furniture Row Racing | Toyota | 50.728 | 50.411 | 50.211 |
| 2 | 19 | Carl Edwards | Joe Gibbs Racing | Toyota | 50.596 | 50.459 | 50.315 |
| 3 | 27 | Paul Menard | Richard Childress Racing | Chevrolet | 50.979 | 50.535 | 50.372 |
| 4 | 11 | Denny Hamlin | Joe Gibbs Racing | Toyota | 50.969 | 50.532 | 50.409 |
| 5 | 31 | Ryan Newman | Richard Childress Racing | Chevrolet | 50.939 | 50.619 | 50.439 |
| 6 | 14 | Tony Stewart | Stewart–Haas Racing | Chevrolet | 51.189 | 50.670 | 50.450 |
| 7 | 2 | Brad Keselowski | Team Penske | Ford | 50.988 | 50.712 | 50.460 |
| 8 | 24 | Chase Elliott (R) | Hendrick Motorsports | Chevrolet | 51.027 | 50.617 | 50.684 |
| 9 | 20 | Matt Kenseth | Joe Gibbs Racing | Toyota | 51.045 | 50.535 | 50.729 |
| 10 | 22 | Joey Logano | Team Penske | Ford | 50.885 | 50.714 | 50.804 |
| 11 | 42 | Kyle Larson | Chip Ganassi Racing | Chevrolet | 51.142 | 50.692 | 50.824 |
| 12 | 3 | Austin Dillon | Richard Childress Racing | Chevrolet | 51.023 | 50.709 | 50.895 |
| 13 | 47 | A. J. Allmendinger | JTG Daugherty Racing | Chevrolet | 51.242 | 50.755 | |
| 14 | 17 | Ricky Stenhouse Jr. | Roush Fenway Racing | Ford | 51.050 | 50.767 | |
| 15 | 41 | Kurt Busch | Stewart–Haas Racing | Chevrolet | 51.068 | 50.795 | |
| 16 | 18 | Kyle Busch | Joe Gibbs Racing | Toyota | 50.817 | 50.832 | |
| 17 | 4 | Kevin Harvick | Stewart–Haas Racing | Chevrolet | 50.798 | 50.851 | |
| 18 | 21 | Ryan Blaney (R) | Wood Brothers Racing | Ford | 50.764 | 50.882 | |
| 19 | 1 | Jamie McMurray | Chip Ganassi Racing | Chevrolet | 51.197 | 50.970 | |
| 20 | 13 | Casey Mears | Germain Racing | Chevrolet | 51.160 | 50.998 | |
| 21 | 48 | Jimmie Johnson | Hendrick Motorsports | Chevrolet | 50.969 | 51.110 | |
| 22 | 34 | Chris Buescher (R) | Front Row Motorsports | Ford | 51.140 | 51.112 | |
| 23 | 5 | Kasey Kahne | Hendrick Motorsports | Chevrolet | 51.117 | 51.165 | |
| 24 | 88 | Jeff Gordon | Hendrick Motorsports | Chevrolet | 51.203 | 51.222 | |
| 25 | 16 | Greg Biffle | Roush Fenway Racing | Ford | 51.252 | | |
| 26 | 10 | Danica Patrick | Stewart–Haas Racing | Chevrolet | 51.310 | | |
| 27 | 43 | Aric Almirola | Richard Petty Motorsports | Ford | 51.433 | | |
| 28 | 15 | Clint Bowyer | HScott Motorsports | Chevrolet | 51.648 | | |
| 29 | 95 | Michael McDowell | Circle Sport – Leavine Family Racing | Chevrolet | 51.654 | | |
| 30 | 7 | Regan Smith | Tommy Baldwin Racing | Chevrolet | 51.776 | | |
| 31 | 6 | Trevor Bayne | Roush Fenway Racing | Ford | 51.863 | | |
| 32 | 38 | Landon Cassill | Front Row Motorsports | Ford | 51.876 | | |
| 33 | 23 | David Ragan | BK Racing | Toyota | 52.000 | | |
| 34 | 83 | Matt DiBenedetto | BK Racing | Toyota | 52.061 | | |
| 35 | 44 | Brian Scott (R) | Richard Petty Motorsports | Ford | 52.262 | | |
| 36 | 98 | Cole Whitt | Premium Motorsports | Chevrolet | 52.412 | | |
| 37 | 32 | Jeb Burton (i) | Go FAS Racing | Ford | 52.500 | | |
| 38 | 30 | Josh Wise | The Motorsports Group | Chevrolet | 52.801 | | |
| 39 | 46 | Michael Annett | HScott Motorsports | Chevrolet | 53.019 | | |
| 40 | 55 | Reed Sorenson | Premium Motorsports | Chevrolet | 56.741 | | |
Official qualifying results

== Race ==
=== First half ===
The race was postponed from July 31 to August 1 due to rain. Under overcast Pennsylvania skies, Martin Truex Jr. led the field to the green flag at 12:10 p.m. The field mostly rode around until the first caution of the race flew on lap 16. It was a scheduled competition caution for overnight rain. Brad Keselowski opted not to pit and assumed the lead. Jimmie Johnson was tagged for his crew being over the wall too soon and restarted the race from the tail end of the field.

The race restarted on lap 20. Greg Biffle got the jump on Keselowski and assumed the lead as the second caution of the race flew for Martin Truex Jr. suffering a right-front tire blowout and slamming the wall in turn 2. “A lug nut bounced off the ground, fell in behind the wheel behind a pit stop,” Truex said. “It’s just bad luck honestly. I knew something wasn’t right in (turn) one and two and I got real tight off of two on that restart and went down the back and was like, ‘Ah, it feels okay.’ And, as I got closer to the tunnel turn I felt it start to go down and by the time I let off and tried to slow down it was just going straight for the fence.” He was spared a last-place finish by Reed Sorenson, who exited the race on lap 29 with engine issues.

The race restarted on lap 23. Biffle maintained a quarter to half a second gap over the second-place car for a large portion of the run until Joey Logano drove under him in turn 2 to take the lead on lap 33. Bad luck continued for Truex as he cut down his left-front tire and was forced to make an unscheduled stop on lap 41. A number of cars began hitting pit road on lap 49. Jeff Gordon was tagged for speeding and was forced to serve a pass through penalty. He was eventually black-flagged. Kevin Harvick passed Logano going into turn 1 to take the lead on lap 52. He surrendered the lead to pit the next lap and handed it back to Logano. He pitted the next lap and handed the lead to Austin Dillon. He pitted the next lap and the lead cycled to Keselowski. Danica Patrick, Michael McDowell and Ricky Stenhouse Jr. were tagged for speeding on pit road and were forced to serve pass through penalties. Patrick was shown the black flag with the white cross, which meant she was no longer being scored until she served her pass through.

Harvick passed by Keselowski to retake the lead on lap 62. The third caution of the race flew on lap 66 for a two-car wreck on the frontstretch. Exiting turn 3, Aric Almirola made contact with Jeb Burton, came across his nose and made contact with the wall. Kyle Larson opted not to pit when the leaders pitted and assumed the lead.

The race restarted on lap 73. Larson and Dillon battled back and forth for eight laps until Dillon made contact with Larson in turn 3 on lap 82. This allowed Logano to slip by and retake the lead on lap 83. Larson said after the race that he doesn't think "you ever want to expect contact, but obviously we were racing really hard. I was doing all I could to stay in front of him, and he was doing all he could to get by me. We battled hard down the frontstretch one time, and then he got back to my inside into Turn 3. I left him plenty of room. I was just going to try and run side-by-side with him again and try and slow him down on the frontstretch. I guess he got loose underneath me and got into our door. That was pretty frustrating at the time, but it happens to not even really matter. That part of the race doesn't matter at all. It doesn't mean one thing to me." The fourth caution of the race flew on lap 85 for rain in turn 1.

=== Second half ===
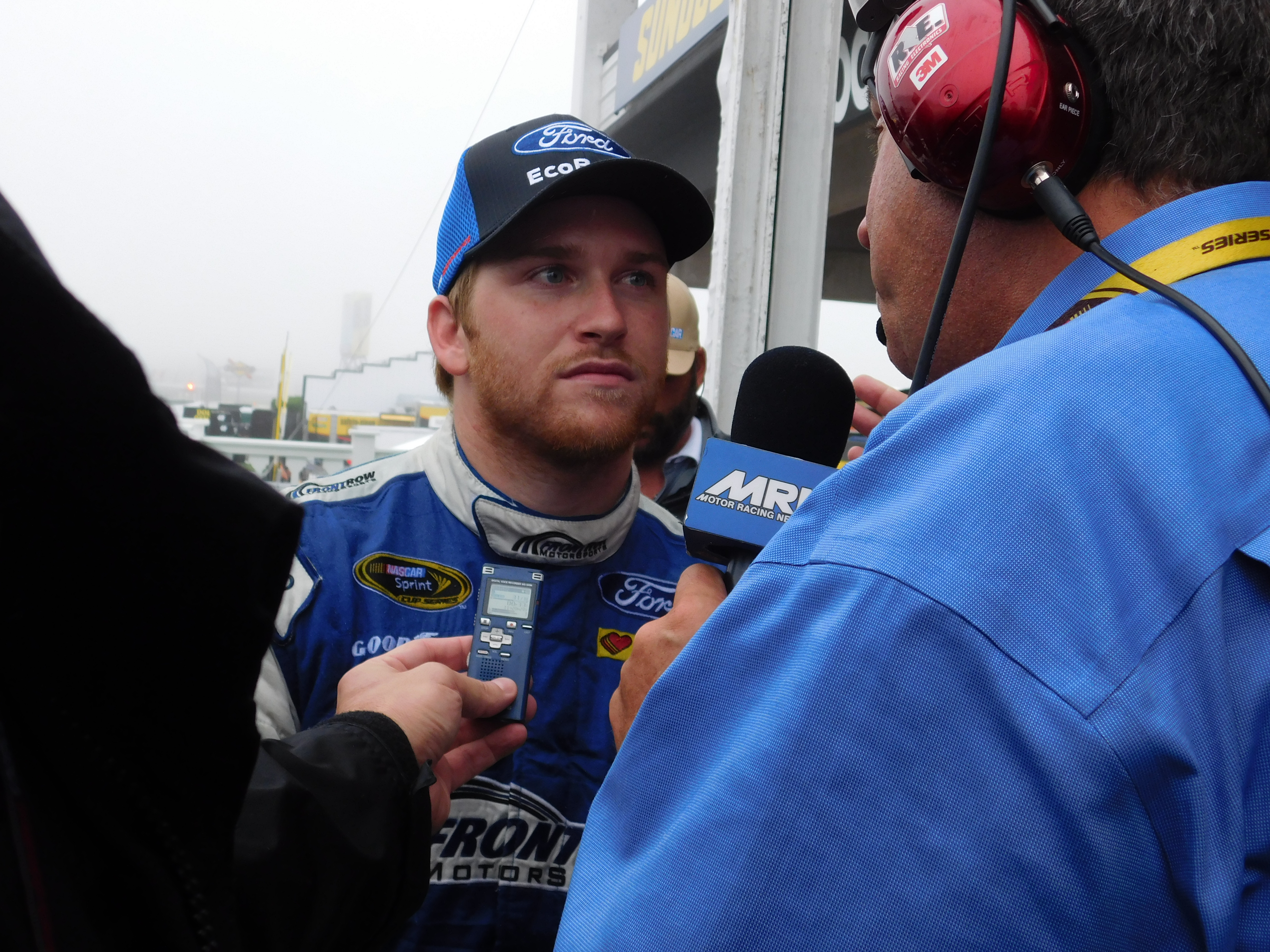
Chris Buescher scored his first career win after fog shortened the race to 138 laps.

The race restarted on lap 92. Matt Kenseth, who stayed out under the third caution, hit pit road from second on lap 96. The fifth caution of the race flew on lap 100 for Truex suffering a tire blowout in turn 1. Larson opted not to pit and assumed the lead.

The race restarted with 57 laps to go. The sixth caution of the race flew for a two-car wreck in turn 2. Rounding the turn, Logano was racing Ryan Newman to his outside and Denny Hamlin to his inside when Chase Elliott got to his inside, got loose, got into Logano and sent both of them into the wall. Elliott continued spinning down the track into the inside wall. Elliott said he "came off (Turn 1) and those guys were three-wide, I thought Denny had the best run so I elected to push him and I thought that would be a good move to kind of get him past them and hopefully he would drag me by. I just got next to (Logano) and got in there. I thought I slowed down enough to not get loose, but I got loose and collected him. I apologize to the No. 22 guys – it was completely my fault. I apologized to my guys as well. They gave me a really good car today.”

The race restarted with 51 laps to go. A number of cars began hitting pit road to make their final stop of the race with 37 laps to go. Larson hit pit road with 35 laps to go and handed the lead to Dillon. He pitted the next lap and handed the lead to Casey Mears. He pitted the next lap and handed the lead to Chris Buescher. The seventh caution of the race flew with 29 laps to go for fog in turn 1. The cars were brought down pit road and the race was red-flagged with 22 laps to go. Buescher would win his first Cup race after NASCAR called the race.

== Post-race ==
=== Driver comments ===
Buescher said after the race that crew chief "Bob (Osborne) made a good call to hold out on the weather and make sure that we could run as far out on fuel as we possibly could, and it worked out really well. The weather got here just when we needed it to. We're in a good spot, and we can definitely make up those six points. We're going to try and get a lot more than that and be ready when the Chase does start to make sure we can advance as it goes through."

After finishing runner-up, Keselowski said his team "hit the green-flag pit cycle perfectly to take advantage and what was going to give the lead to us and give us the prime opportunity to win the race. Unfortunately, that cloud came rolling in at the right or wrong time, how you want to look at it, to box us out and we ended up finishing second today. We needed about three more laps (before the fog), but it is what it is.”

After finishing third, Smith said he thought "it was obvious we played the same strategy that Buescher and those guys did to get ourselves up there, and as Brad alluded to, the cloud kind of came at just the right time for us. We were within five or six laps of having to pit, but it’s a credit to my guys for seeing the opportunity to do that strategy, and when you’re a small team working hard to try and go up against some of the bigger teams that we do, you’ve got to take the opportunities when they present themselves, and today and this weekend in general, just kind of had that feeling to it with the rain on and off all weekend long, and we were able to make the most out of it, and it’s something I’m proud of them for doing, and happy for Tommy.”

== Race results ==
| Pos | No. | Driver | Team | Manufacturer | Laps | Points |
|---|---|---|---|---|---|---|
| 1 | 34 | Chris Buescher (R) | Front Row Motorsports | Ford | 138 | 44 |
| 2 | 2 | Brad Keselowski | Team Penske | Ford | 138 | 40 |
| 3 | 7 | Regan Smith | Tommy Baldwin Racing | Chevrolet | 138 | 38 |
| 4 | 4 | Kevin Harvick | Stewart–Haas Racing | Chevrolet | 138 | 38 |
| 5 | 14 | Tony Stewart | Stewart–Haas Racing | Chevrolet | 138 | 36 |
| 6 | 42 | Kyle Larson | Chip Ganassi Racing | Chevrolet | 138 | 36 |
| 7 | 11 | Denny Hamlin | Joe Gibbs Racing | Toyota | 138 | 34 |
| 8 | 19 | Carl Edwards | Joe Gibbs Racing | Toyota | 138 | 33 |
| 9 | 18 | Kyle Busch | Joe Gibbs Racing | Toyota | 138 | 33 |
| 10 | 41 | Kurt Busch | Stewart–Haas Racing | Chevrolet | 138 | 31 |
| 11 | 21 | Ryan Blaney (R) | Wood Brothers Racing | Ford | 138 | 30 |
| 12 | 31 | Ryan Newman | Richard Childress Racing | Chevrolet | 138 | 30 |
| 13 | 3 | Austin Dillon | Richard Childress Racing | Chevrolet | 138 | 29 |
| 14 | 47 | A. J. Allmendinger | JTG Daugherty Racing | Chevrolet | 138 | 28 |
| 15 | 5 | Kasey Kahne | Hendrick Motorsports | Chevrolet | 138 | 26 |
| 16 | 48 | Jimmie Johnson | Hendrick Motorsports | Chevrolet | 138 | 25 |
| 17 | 20 | Matt Kenseth | Joe Gibbs Racing | Toyota | 138 | 24 |
| 18 | 17 | Ricky Stenhouse Jr. | Roush Fenway Racing | Ford | 138 | 23 |
| 19 | 6 | Trevor Bayne | Roush Fenway Racing | Ford | 138 | 22 |
| 20 | 1 | Jamie McMurray | Chip Ganassi Racing | Chevrolet | 138 | 21 |
| 21 | 13 | Casey Mears | Germain Racing | Chevrolet | 138 | 20 |
| 22 | 10 | Danica Patrick | Stewart–Haas Racing | Chevrolet | 138 | 19 |
| 23 | 95 | Michael McDowell | Circle Sport – Leavine Family Racing | Chevrolet | 138 | 18 |
| 24 | 44 | Brian Scott (R) | Richard Petty Motorsports | Ford | 138 | 17 |
| 25 | 16 | Greg Biffle | Roush Fenway Racing | Ford | 138 | 17 |
| 26 | 15 | Clint Bowyer | HScott Motorsports | Chevrolet | 138 | 15 |
| 27 | 88 | Jeff Gordon | Hendrick Motorsports | Chevrolet | 138 | 14 |
| 28 | 83 | Matt DiBenedetto | BK Racing | Toyota | 138 | 13 |
| 29 | 46 | Michael Annett | HScott Motorsports | Chevrolet | 137 | 12 |
| 30 | 38 | Landon Cassill | Front Row Motorsports | Ford | 137 | 11 |
| 31 | 98 | Cole Whitt | Premium Motorsports | Chevrolet | 137 | 10 |
| 32 | 23 | David Ragan | BK Racing | Toyota | 135 | 9 |
| 33 | 24 | Chase Elliott (R) | Hendrick Motorsports | Chevrolet | 134 | 8 |
| 34 | 30 | Josh Wise | The Motorsports Group | Chevrolet | 132 | 7 |
| 35 | 27 | Paul Menard | Richard Childress Racing | Chevrolet | 119 | 6 |
| 36 | 32 | Jeb Burton (i) | Go FAS Racing | Ford | 117 | 0 |
| 37 | 22 | Joey Logano | Team Penske | Ford | 115 | 6 |
| 38 | 78 | Martin Truex Jr. | Furniture Row Racing | Toyota | 82 | 4 |
| 39 | 43 | Aric Almirola | Richard Petty Motorsports | Ford | 66 | 2 |
| 40 | 55 | Reed Sorenson | Premium Motorsports | Chevrolet | 29 | 1 |
Official race results

=== Race summary ===
- Lead changes: 19 among different drivers
- Cautions/Laps: 7 for 31 laps
- Red flags: 1
- Time of race: 2 hours, 42 minutes and 15 seconds
- Average speed: 127.581 miles per hour (205.322 km/h)

== Media ==
=== Television ===
NBC Sports covered the race on the television side. Rick Allen, Jeff Burton and Steve Letarte had the call in the booth for the race. Dave Burns, Parker Kligerman, Mike Massaro and Marty Snider reported from pit lane during the race.

NBCSN
| Booth announcers | Pit reporters |
|---|---|
| Lap-by-lap: Rick Allen; Color-commentator: Jeff Burton; Color-commentator: Steve Letarte | Dave Burns; Parker Kligerman; Mike Massaro; Marty Snider |

=== Radio ===
Motor Racing Network had the radio call for the race, which was simulcast on Sirius XM NASCAR Radio.

MRN
| Booth announcers | Turn announcers | Pit reporters |
|---|---|---|
| Lead announcer: Joe Moore; Announcer: Jeff Striegle; Announcer: Rusty Wallace | Turn 1: Dave Moody; Turns 2: Mike Bagley; Turn 3: Kyle Rickey | Alex Hayden; Winston Kelley; Steve Post |

== Standings after the race ==
Drivers' Championship standings
| | Pos | Manufacturer | Points |
|---|---|---|---|
| | 1 | Kevin Harvick | 709 |
| | 2 | Brad Keselowski | 687 (–22) |
| | 3 | Kurt Busch | 658 (–51) |
| 1 | 4 | Kyle Busch | 634 (–75) |
| 1 | 5 | Carl Edwards | 626 (–83) |
| 2 | 6 | Joey Logano | 612 (–97) |
| 1 | 7 | Jimmie Johnson | 577 (–132) |
| 1 | 8 | Martin Truex Jr. | 577 (–132) |
| 1 | 9 | Denny Hamlin | 576 (–133) |
| 1 | 10 | Matt Kenseth | 569 (–140) |
| 1 | 11 | Austin Dillon | 549 (–160) |
| 1 | 12 | Ryan Newman | 537 (–172) |
| 2 | 13 | Chase Elliott (R) | 533 (–176) |
| | 14 | Jamie McMurray | 517 (–192) |
| | 15 | Kyle Larson | 508 (–201) |
| | 16 | Kasey Kahne | 488 (–221) |
Official drivers' standings

Manufacturers' Championship standings
| Pos | Manufacturer | Points |
|---|---|---|
| 1 | Toyota | 866 |
| 2 | Chevrolet | 838 (–28) |
| 3 | Ford | 803 (–63) |
Official manufacturer's standings

- Note: Only the first 16 positions are included for the driver standings.
  . – Driver has clinched a position in the Chase for the Sprint Cup.

== Notes ==
| Previous race: 2016 Brickyard 400 | Sprint Cup Series; 2016 season | Next race: 2016 Cheez-It 355 at The Glen |
