= 2016 Brickyard 400 =

2016 Crown Royal presents the Combat Wounded Coalition 400 at the Brickyard
Race details
- Race 20 of 36 in the 2016 NASCAR Sprint Cup Series
- The 2016 Brickyard 400 program cover.
- Date: July 24, 2016
- Location: Indianapolis Motor Speedway in Speedway, Indiana
- Course: Permanent racing facility
- Course length: 2.5 miles (4.023 km)
- Distance: 170 laps, 425 mi (683.971 km)
- Scheduled distance: 160 laps, 400 mi (643.738 km)
- Average speed: 128.940 mph (207.509 km/h)

Pole position
Driver	Kyle Busch	Joe Gibbs Racing
- Time: 48.745

Most laps led
Driver	Kyle Busch	Joe Gibbs Racing
- Laps: 149

Winner
No. 18	Kyle Busch	Joe Gibbs Racing

Television in the United States
- Network: NBCSN
- Announcers: Rick Allen, Jeff Burton and Steve Letarte
- Nielsen ratings: 2.8/5 (Overnight); 3.1/6 (Final); 5.2 million viewers

Radio in the United States
- Radio: IndyCar Radio Network
- Booth announcers: Doug Rice, Pat Patterson and John Andretti
- Turn announcers: Mark Jaynes (1), Nick Yeoman (2), Jake Query (3) and Chris Denari (4)

The 2016 Brickyard 400, branded as Crown Royal presents the Combat Wounded Coalition 400 at the Brickyard, was a NASCAR Sprint Cup Series stock car race held on July 24, 2016, at Indianapolis Motor Speedway in Speedway, Indiana. The 23rd running of the Brickyard 400, it was contested over 170 laps – extended from 160 laps due to an overtime finish – on the 2.5-mile (4.0-kilometre) speedway, and was the 20th race of the 2016 NASCAR Sprint Cup Series.

Kyle Busch scored his second career victory at the Brickyard, the race had four lead changes among different drivers and eight cautions for 31 laps, and one red flag for seven minutes and 45 seconds.

This was the first Brickyard 400 without Dale Earnhardt Jr. since the 1999 edition and the first Brickyard 400 without an Earnhardt in the starting lineup. Also, this marked the final Brickyard 400 starts for 5-time Brickyard 400 winner Jeff Gordon and 2-time Brickyard 400 winner Tony Stewart.

== Report ==
=== Entry list ===
The preliminary entry list for the race included 41 cars and was released on July 15, 2016, at 10:12 a.m. Eastern time. Dale Earnhardt Jr. was slated to run the race in the No. 88 Hendrick Motorsports Chevrolet, but concussion symptoms forced him to sit out and be replaced by Jeff Gordon.

No.	Driver	Team	Manufacturer
1	Jamie McMurray (W)	Chip Ganassi Racing	Chevrolet
2	Brad Keselowski	Team Penske	Ford
3	Austin Dillon	Richard Childress Racing	Chevrolet
4	Kevin Harvick (W)	Stewart–Haas Racing	Chevrolet
5	Kasey Kahne	Hendrick Motorsports	Chevrolet
6	Trevor Bayne	Roush Fenway Racing	Ford
7	Regan Smith	Tommy Baldwin Racing	Chevrolet
10	Danica Patrick	Stewart–Haas Racing	Chevrolet
11	Denny Hamlin	Joe Gibbs Racing	Toyota
13	Casey Mears	Germain Racing	Chevrolet
14	Tony Stewart (W)	Stewart–Haas Racing	Chevrolet
15	Clint Bowyer	HScott Motorsports	Chevrolet
16	Greg Biffle	Roush Fenway Racing	Ford
17	Ricky Stenhouse Jr.	Roush Fenway Racing	Ford
18	Kyle Busch (W)	Joe Gibbs Racing	Toyota
19	Carl Edwards	Joe Gibbs Racing	Toyota
20	Matt Kenseth	Joe Gibbs Racing	Toyota
21	Ryan Blaney (R)	Wood Brothers Racing	Ford
22	Joey Logano	Team Penske	Ford
23	David Ragan	BK Racing	Toyota
24	Chase Elliott (R)	Hendrick Motorsports	Chevrolet
27	Paul Menard (W)	Richard Childress Racing	Chevrolet
30	Josh Wise	The Motorsports Group	Chevrolet
31	Ryan Newman (W)	Richard Childress Racing	Chevrolet
32	Patrick Carpentier	Go FAS Racing	Ford
34	Chris Buescher (R)	Front Row Motorsports	Ford
38	Landon Cassill	Front Row Motorsports	Ford
41	Kurt Busch	Stewart–Haas Racing	Chevrolet
42	Kyle Larson	Chip Ganassi Racing	Chevrolet
43	Aric Almirola	Richard Petty Motorsports	Ford
44	Brian Scott (R)	Richard Petty Motorsports	Ford
46	Michael Annett	HScott Motorsports	Chevrolet
47	A. J. Allmendinger	JTG Daugherty Racing	Chevrolet
48	Jimmie Johnson (W)	Hendrick Motorsports	Chevrolet
55	Reed Sorenson	Premium Motorsports	Chevrolet
78	Martin Truex Jr.	Furniture Row Racing	Toyota
83	Matt DiBenedetto	BK Racing	Toyota
88	Jeff Gordon (W)	Hendrick Motorsports	Chevrolet
93	Ryan Ellis	BK Racing	Toyota
95	Michael McDowell	Circle Sport – Leavine Family Racing	Chevrolet
98	Cole Whitt	Premium Motorsports	Chevrolet
Official entry list

== Practice ==
=== First practice ===
Jimmie Johnson was the fastest in the first practice session with a time of 48.864 and a speed of 184.185 mph (296.417 km/h).

Pos	No.	Driver	Team	Manufacturer	Time	Speed
1	48	Jimmie Johnson	Hendrick Motorsports	Chevrolet	48.864	184.185
2	11	Denny Hamlin	Joe Gibbs Racing	Toyota	48.298	182.563
3	13	Casey Mears	Germain Racing	Chevrolet	49.904	180.346
Official first practice results

=== Final practice ===
Kyle Busch was the fastest in the final practice session with a time of 48.749 and a speed of 184.619 mph (297.115 km/h).

Pos	No.	Driver	Team	Manufacturer	Time	Speed
1	18	Kyle Busch	Joe Gibbs Racing	Toyota	48.749	184.619
2	4	Kevin Harvick	Stewart–Haas Racing	Chevrolet	48.842	184.268
3	42	Kyle Larson	Chip Ganassi Racing	Chevrolet	48.975	183.767
Official final practice results

== Qualifying ==
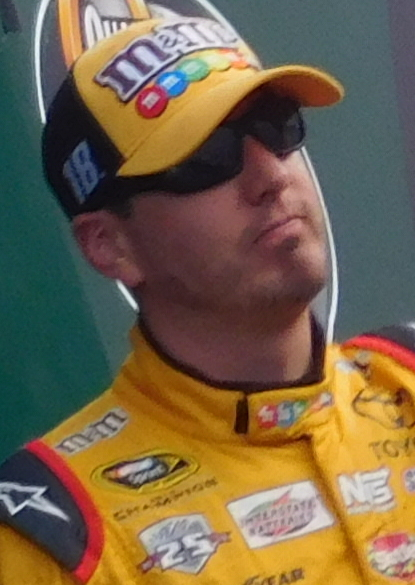
Kyle Busch won the pole.

Kyle Busch scored the pole for the race with a time of 48.745 and a speed of 184.634 mph (297.140 km/h). Busch said afterwards that the pole "means a lot to me and it means a lot to the guys on this team. To be able to sit on the pole here at Indy is something that I’ve always wanted to do. (Crew chief) Adam Stevens and the guys gave me a great piece this weekend.

After qualifying third, Tony Stewart said he wished he "could do a lap ... one more time and not clip the apron in (Turn) 4; I think we could have been on the pole. What we learned today for qualifying, we are going to have to take some of that and try to make a car a little better for tomorrow."

Making his first start since Homestead in November, Jeff Gordon – who qualified 21st subbing for Dale Earnhardt Jr. – said he was "much calmer than I was [Friday]. Usually, my heart is beating more for qualifying than it is for practice. But that wasn't the case [in practice]. I feel more relaxed and comfortable in the car."

=== Qualifying results ===
Pos	No.	Driver	Team	Manufacturer	R1	R2	R3
1	18	Kyle Busch	Joe Gibbs Racing	Toyota	48.438	48.589	48.745
2	19	Carl Edwards	Joe Gibbs Racing	Toyota	48.503	48.756	48.768
3	14	Tony Stewart	Stewart–Haas Racing	Chevrolet	48.542	48.679	48.826
4	11	Denny Hamlin	Joe Gibbs Racing	Toyota	48.695	48.792	48.892
5	2	Brad Keselowski	Team Penske	Ford	48.500	48.891	49.022
6	31	Ryan Newman	Richard Childress Racing	Chevrolet	48.806	48.993	49.126
7	4	Kevin Harvick	Stewart–Haas Racing	Chevrolet	48.635	49.007	49.220
8	78	Martin Truex Jr.	Furniture Row Racing	Toyota	48.742	48.951	49.315
9	1	Jamie McMurray	Chip Ganassi Racing	Chevrolet	48.644	48.958	49.325
10	42	Kyle Larson	Chip Ganassi Racing	Chevrolet	48.913	48.992	49.346
11	41	Kurt Busch	Stewart–Haas Racing	Chevrolet	48.681	49.024	49.356
12	3	Austin Dillon	Richard Childress Racing	Chevrolet	48.512	49.000	49.373
13	48	Jimmie Johnson	Hendrick Motorsports	Chevrolet	48.435	49.032	
14	22	Joey Logano	Team Penske	Ford	48.990	49.107	
15	24	Chase Elliott (R)	Hendrick Motorsports	Chevrolet	48.554	49.162	
16	17	Ricky Stenhouse Jr.	Roush Fenway Racing	Ford	48.620	49.175	
17	21	Ryan Blaney (R)	Wood Brothers Racing	Ford	48.792	49.228	
18	20	Matt Kenseth	Joe Gibbs Racing	Toyota	48.881	49.228	
19	16	Greg Biffle	Roush Fenway Racing	Ford	49.052	49.228	
20	6	Trevor Bayne	Roush Fenway Racing	Ford	49.104	49.456	
21	88	Jeff Gordon	Hendrick Motorsports	Chevrolet	48.769	49.491	
22	34	Chris Buescher (R)	Front Row Motorsports	Ford	49.114	49.651	
23	27	Paul Menard	Richard Childress Racing	Chevrolet	48.949	49.670	
24	10	Danica Patrick	Stewart–Haas Racing	Chevrolet	48.709	49.984	
25	47	A. J. Allmendinger	JTG Daugherty Racing	Chevrolet	49.135		
26	5	Kasey Kahne	Hendrick Motorsports	Chevrolet	49.151		
27	95	Michael McDowell	Circle Sport – Leavine Family Racing	Chevrolet	49.229		
28	23	David Ragan	BK Racing	Toyota	49.342		
29	43	Aric Almirola	Richard Petty Motorsports	Ford	49.391		
30	83	Matt DiBenedetto	BK Racing	Toyota	49.428		
31	15	Clint Bowyer	HScott Motorsports	Chevrolet	49.469		
32	44	Brian Scott (R)	Richard Petty Motorsports	Ford	49.535		
33	38	Landon Cassill	Front Row Motorsports	Ford	49.630		
34	13	Casey Mears	Germain Racing	Chevrolet	49.781		
35	98	Cole Whitt	Premium Motorsports	Chevrolet	50.097		
36	93	Ryan Ellis (i)	BK Racing	Toyota	50.274		
37	7	Regan Smith	Tommy Baldwin Racing	Chevrolet	50.461		
38	46	Michael Annett	HScott Motorsports	Chevrolet	50.568		
39	55	Reed Sorenson	Premium Motorsports	Chevrolet	51.084		
40	32	Patrick Carpentier	Go FAS Racing	Ford	51.716		
Failed to qualify
41	30	Josh Wise	The Motorsports Group	Chevrolet	52.737		
Official qualifying results

== Race ==
=== First half ===
Under clear blue Indiana skies, Kyle Busch led the field to the green flag at 3:22 p.m. During the first lap, Tony Stewart used all of the real estate on the backstretch and made a power move under Denny Hamlin to take second. The first caution of the race flew on the fourth lap for Matt DiBenedetto blowing an engine on the frontstretch. He went on to finish 40th.

The race restarted on the ninth lap. Busch just pulled away from the field during this run. By lap 19, he pulled to a five and a half second lead over teammate Denny Hamlin. During the run, Stewart began falling from second to eighth. Martin Truex Jr. kicked off a round of green flag stops on lap 25. More cars followed suit the next lap. Busch pitted from the lead on lap 28 and handed it to Brad Keselowski. Kevin Harvick made an unscheduled stop on lap 32 for what he believed to be a flat tire. It turned out that the tire wasn't flat. Keselowski and Joey Logano pitted on lap 42 and the lead cycled back to Busch.

The second caution of the race flew on lap 52 after Greg Biffle suffered a right-front tire blowout and slammed the wall in turn 1. Logano opted not to pit under the caution and assumed the race lead.

The race restarted on lap 59. Busch ran down Logano to retake the lead on lap 63. A number of cars began hitting pit road on lap 84. Hamlin and Jimmie Johnson were tagged for speeding on pit road and were forced to serve a pass through penalty. Busch pitted on lap 87 and handed the lead to Carl Edwards. He pitted the next lap and the lead cycled back to Busch.

=== Second half ===
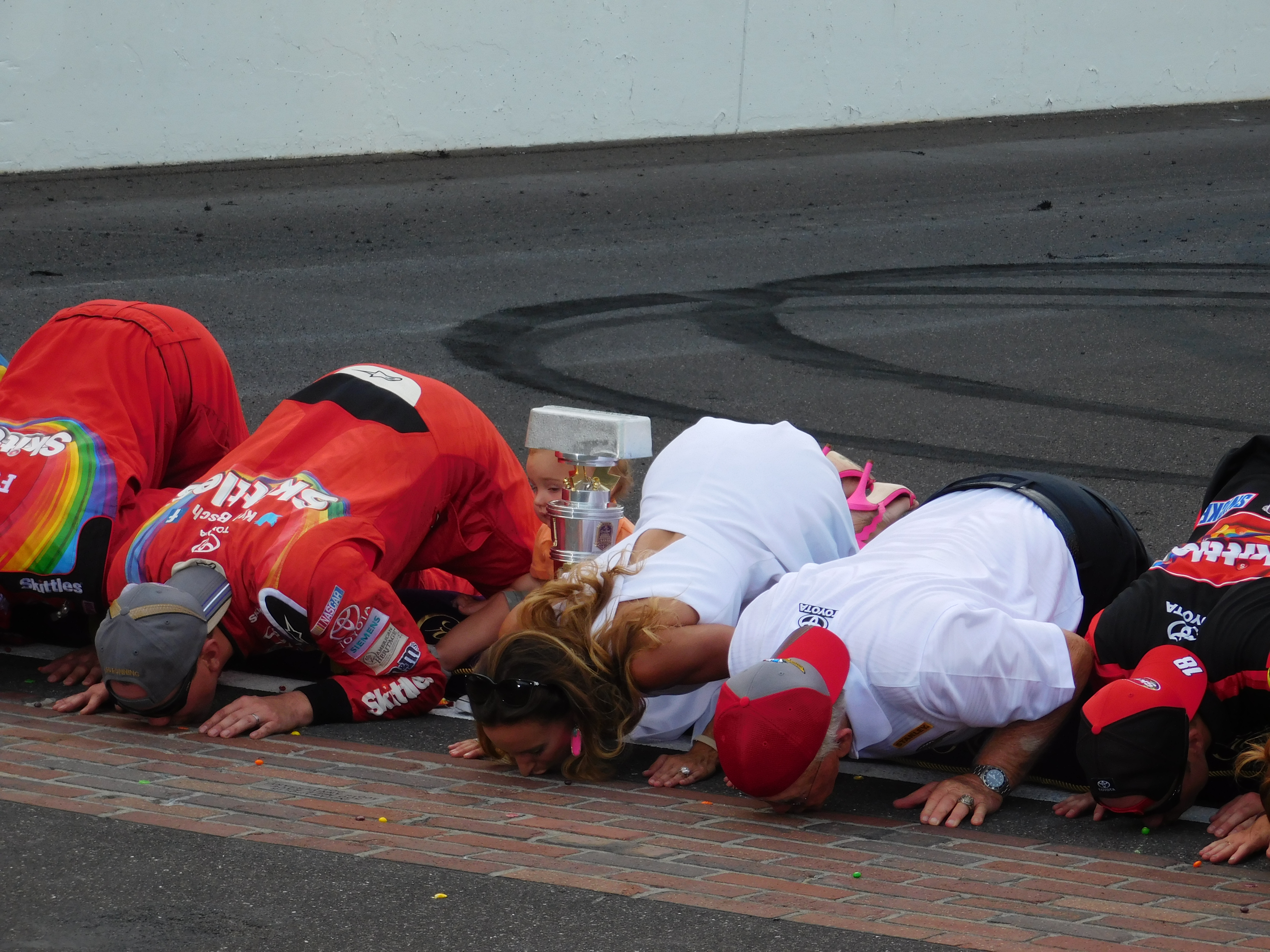
Kyle Busch won his second straight Brickyard 400.

A number of cars began hitting pit road on lap 112. The third caution of the race came out on lap 120 for David Ragan blowing a left-front tire and slamming the wall head-on in turn 2. Tony Stewart and Jamie McMurray were tagged for speeding on pit road and restarted the race from the tail end of the field.

The race restarted with 33 laps to go. The fourth caution of the race flew with 30 laps to go for Regan Smith coming to a halt on the backstretch.

The race restarted with 26 laps to go. Debris in turn 1 brought out the fifth caution of the race with 10 laps to go. The top-five cars opted not to pit while the rest of the lead lap cars elected to hit pit road.

The race restarted with seven laps to go and the sixth caution of the race flew for a multi-car wreck in turn 1. It started when Edwards got loose and slammed into the wall, collecting drivers like Ryan Newman and Keselowski. “It felt like I just got tight down there,” Edwards said. "I had a little trouble there on the starts and I got down there, we were fighting really hard for the bottom and it felt like I got tight with whoever was on the outside of me. If indeed that is what happened, I apologize, that’s pretty frustrating. I don’t know if he came down or if I came up. It felt like I got in there and just scrubbed that right front. Hopefully a Toyota wins. I hate it for Stanley, Joe Gibbs Racing and everybody that was caught up in that wreck. It’s frustrating.” This brought out the red flag to ensue cleanup. The race resumed under caution shortly thereafter.

The race restarted on lap 159, with two laps to go in regulation. The seventh caution of the race flew half a lap later for a two-car wreck on the backstretch involving Trevor Bayne and Clint Bowyer.

=== Overtime ===
==== Attempt #1 ====
The race restarted on lap 165 and the eighth caution of the race flew when Jamie McMurray slid down the access road in turn 1, coming back up onto the track and being hit by Ryan Newman.

==== Attempt #2 ====
The race restarted on lap 169. Kyle Busch was leading at the finish and scored his second career victory at the Brickyard.

== Post-race ==
=== Driver comments ===
Busch said afterwards that his "Toyota was awesome today, it was just so fast and able to get out front and stay out front. Not even some of my teammates could challenge. This was hooked up and on rails.” “The repeat-ability there was something I wasn’t looking forward to,” Busch added. “I certainly didn’t want one, let alone (four) of them. You never know what is going to happen on those restarts. There’s a lot of gamesmanship that kind of gets played, and there was a little bit of back and forth a little bit with the guys in the different grooves. I think I had Kenseth to my outside. I had Truex to my outside. I think I had Carl to my outside and then Joey Logano to my outside, so there were a lot of different characters that we had to deal with on the restarts. But I always felt like I could hit my marks and set sail each time.”

== Race results ==
Pos	No.	Driver	Team	Manufacturer	Laps	Points
1	18	Kyle Busch	Joe Gibbs Racing	Toyota	170	45
2	20	Matt Kenseth	Joe Gibbs Racing	Toyota	170	39
3	48	Jimmie Johnson	Hendrick Motorsports	Chevrolet	170	38
4	11	Denny Hamlin	Joe Gibbs Racing	Toyota	170	37
5	42	Kyle Larson	Chip Ganassi Racing	Chevrolet	170	36
6	4	Kevin Harvick	Stewart–Haas Racing	Chevrolet	170	35
7	22	Joey Logano	Team Penske	Ford	170	35
8	78	Martin Truex Jr.	Furniture Row Racing	Toyota	170	33
9	3	Austin Dillon	Richard Childress Racing	Chevrolet	170	32
10	27	Paul Menard	Richard Childress Racing	Chevrolet	170	31
11	14	Tony Stewart	Stewart–Haas Racing	Chevrolet	170	30
12	17	Ricky Stenhouse Jr.	Roush Fenway Racing	Ford	170	29
13	88	Jeff Gordon	Hendrick Motorsports	Chevrolet	170	28
14	34	Chris Buescher (R)	Front Row Motorsports	Ford	170	27
15	24	Chase Elliott (R)	Hendrick Motorsports	Chevrolet	170	26
16	41	Kurt Busch	Stewart–Haas Racing	Chevrolet	170	25
17	2	Brad Keselowski	Team Penske	Ford	170	25
18	5	Kasey Kahne	Hendrick Motorsports	Chevrolet	170	23
19	1	Jamie McMurray	Chip Ganassi Racing	Chevrolet	170	22
20	38	Landon Cassill	Front Row Motorsports	Ford	169	21
21	15	Clint Bowyer	HScott Motorsports	Chevrolet	169	20
22	10	Danica Patrick	Stewart–Haas Racing	Chevrolet	169	19
23	95	Michael McDowell	Circle Sport – Leavine Family Racing	Chevrolet	168	18
24	13	Casey Mears	Germain Racing	Chevrolet	168	17
25	43	Aric Almirola	Richard Petty Motorsports	Ford	168	16
26	7	Regan Smith	Tommy Baldwin Racing	Chevrolet	168	15
27	44	Brian Scott (R)	Richard Petty Motorsports	Ford	168	14
28	46	Michael Annett	HScott Motorsports	Chevrolet	167	13
29	98	Cole Whitt	Premium Motorsports	Chevrolet	167	12
30	6	Trevor Bayne	Roush Fenway Racing	Ford	167	11
31	31	Ryan Newman	Richard Childress Racing	Chevrolet	166	10
32	93	Ryan Ellis (i)	BK Racing	Toyota	166	0
33	55	Reed Sorenson	Premium Motorsports	Chevrolet	165	8
34	32	Patrick Carpentier	Go FAS Racing	Ford	164	7
35	19	Carl Edwards	Joe Gibbs Racing	Toyota	154	6
36	21	Ryan Blaney (R)	Wood Brothers Racing	Ford	152	5
37	23	David Ragan	BK Racing	Toyota	117	4
38	47	A. J. Allmendinger	JTG Daugherty Racing	Chevrolet	71	3
39	16	Greg Biffle	Roush Fenway Racing	Ford	53	2
40	83	Matt DiBenedetto	BK Racing	Toyota	4	1
Official race results

=== Race summary ===
- Lead changes: 4 among different drivers
- Cautions/Laps: 8 for 34 laps
- Red flags: 1 for 7 minutes, 25 seconds
- Time of race: 3 hours, 17 minutes and 46 seconds
- Average speed: 128.940 miles per hour (207.509 km/h)

== Media ==
=== Television ===
NBC Sports covered the race on the television side. Rick Allen, Jeff Burton and Steve Letarte had the call in the booth for the race. Dave Burns, Mike Massaro, Marty Snider and Kelli Stavast reported from pit lane during the race.

NBCSN
Booth announcers	Pit reporters
Lap-by-lap: Rick Allen; Color-commentator: Jeff Burton; Color-commentator: Steve Letarte	Dave Burns; Mike Massaro; Marty Snider; Kelli Stavast

=== Radio ===
Indianapolis Motor Speedway Radio Network and the Performance Racing Network jointly co-produced the radio broadcast for the race, which was simulcast on Sirius XM NASCAR Radio, and aired on IMS or PRN stations, depending on contractual obligations. The lead announcers and two pit reporters were PRN staff, while the turns and two pit reporters were from IMS.

PRN/IMS Radio
Booth announcers	Turn announcers	Pit reporters
Lead announcer: Doug Rice; Announcer: Pat Patterson; Announcer: John Andretti	Turn 1: Mark Jaynes; Turn 2: Nick Yeoman; Turn 3: Jake Query; Turn 4: Chris Denari	Brad Gillie; Brett McMillan; Kevin Lee; Michael Young

== Standings after the race ==
Drivers' Championship standings
	Pos	Manufacturer	Points
	1	Kevin Harvick	671
	2	Brad Keselowski	647 (–24)
	3	Kurt Busch	627 (–44)
1	4	Joey Logano	606 (–65)
1	5	Kyle Busch	601 (–70)
2	6	Carl Edwards	593 (–78)
	7	Martin Truex Jr.	573 (–98)
	8	Jimmie Johnson	552 (–119)
	9	Matt Kenseth	545 (–126)
	10	Denny Hamlin	542 (–129)
	11	Chase Elliott (R)	525 (–146)
1	12	Austin Dillon	520 (–151)
1	13	Ryan Newman	507 (–164)
	14	Jamie McMurray	496 (–175)
4	15	Kyle Larson	472 (–199)
1	16	Kasey Kahne	462 (–209)
Official driver's standings

Manufacturers' Championship standings
Pos	Manufacturer	Points
1	Toyota	832
2	Chevrolet	800 (–32)
3	Ford	759 (–73)
Official manufacturers' standings

- Note: Only the first 16 positions are included for the driver standings.
  . – Driver has clinched a position in the Chase for the Sprint Cup.

Previous race: 2016 New Hampshire 301	Sprint Cup Series; 2016 season	Next race: 2016 Pennsylvania 400
