= Chris Buescher =

American racing driver (born 1992)

- Buescher at Las Vegas Motor Speedway in 2026
- Born: Christopher William Buescher; October 29, 1992 (age 34); Prosper, Texas, U.S.
- Achievements: 2012 ARCA Racing Series Champion; 2015 NASCAR Xfinity Series Champion; 2022 Bluegreen Vacations Duel Winner
- Awards: 2011 ARCA Racing Series Rookie of the Year

NASCAR Cup Series career
- 401 races run over 12 years
- Car no., team: No. 17 (RFK Racing)
- 2026 position: 16th
- Best finish: 7th (2023)
- First race: 2015 Auto Club 400 (California)
- Last race: 2026 Season Finale 400 (Homestead)
- First win: 2016 Pennsylvania 400 (Pocono)
- Last win: 2024 Go Bowling at The Glen (Watkins Glen)
Wins	Top tens	Poles
6	97	1

NASCAR O'Reilly Auto Parts Series career
- 74 races run over 4 years
- 2015 position: 1st
- Best finish: 1st (2015)
- First race: 2011 Bubba Burger 250 (Richmond)
- Last race: 2015 Ford EcoBoost 300 (Homestead)
- First win: 2014 Nationwide Children's Hospital 200 (Mid-Ohio)
- Last win: 2015 Buckle Up 200 (Dover)
Wins	Top tens	Poles
3	36	0

NASCAR FedEx Freight Truck Series career
- 1 race run over 1 year
- 2025 position: 101st
- Best finish: 101st (2025)
- First race: 2025 Mission 176 at The Glen (Watkins Glen)
Wins	Top tens	Poles
0	0	0

ARCA Menards Series career
- 57 races run over 5 years
- Best finish: 1st (2012)
- First race: 2009 Kentuckiana Ford Dealers 200 (Salem)
- Last race: 2013 Kentuckiana Ford Dealers ARCA Fall Classic (Salem)
- First win: 2010 Menards 200 Presented by Federated Car Care (Toledo)
- Last win: 2013 SCOTT 160 (Road America)
Wins	Top tens	Poles
10	43	5
- Statistics up to date as of November 8, 2026.

Christopher William Buescher (born October 29, 1992) is an American professional stock car racing driver. He competes full-time in the NASCAR Cup Series, driving the No. 17 Ford Mustang Dark Horse SC for RFK Racing. He is the 2012 ARCA Racing Series and 2015 NASCAR Xfinity Series champion and the cousin of 2012 NASCAR Camping World Truck Series champion James Buescher.

== Racing career ==
=== ARCA Racing Series ===
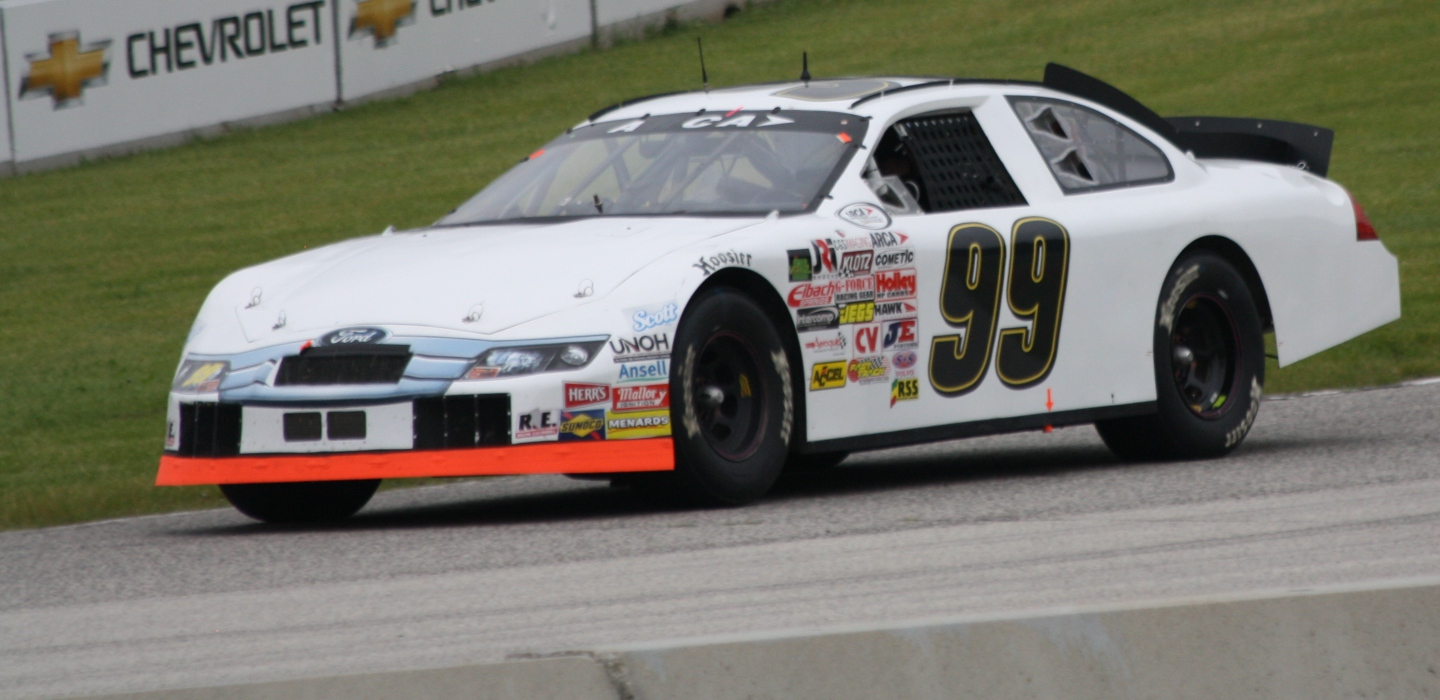
Buescher's 2013 ARCA car at Road America

Buescher began his professional racing career in 2005, driving Legends cars in Texas for Speedway Legends, winning over one hundred races. (Speedway Legends, worked with several top drivers, David Ragan, Jonathan Davenport, etc.) In 2008, Buescher moved to North Carolina to be mentored by NASCAR Cup Series driver David Ragan and signed as a development driver for Roush Fenway Racing, Buescher began competing in ARCA competition in 2009; he went on to win the series championship in 2012, becoming the only driver ever to complete every lap in a season of competition in the series.

=== Craftsman Truck Series ===
On August 4, 2025, it was announced that Buescher would compete in the race at Watkins Glen, driving the No. 66 Ford for ThorSport Racing.

=== Xfinity Series ===
Buescher made his debut in NASCAR competition for Roush Fenway Racing in 2011, driving two races in the Nationwide Series; he returned to the series in 2013, driving in seven races for the team, in addition to a limited ARCA schedule with Roulo Bros. Racing.

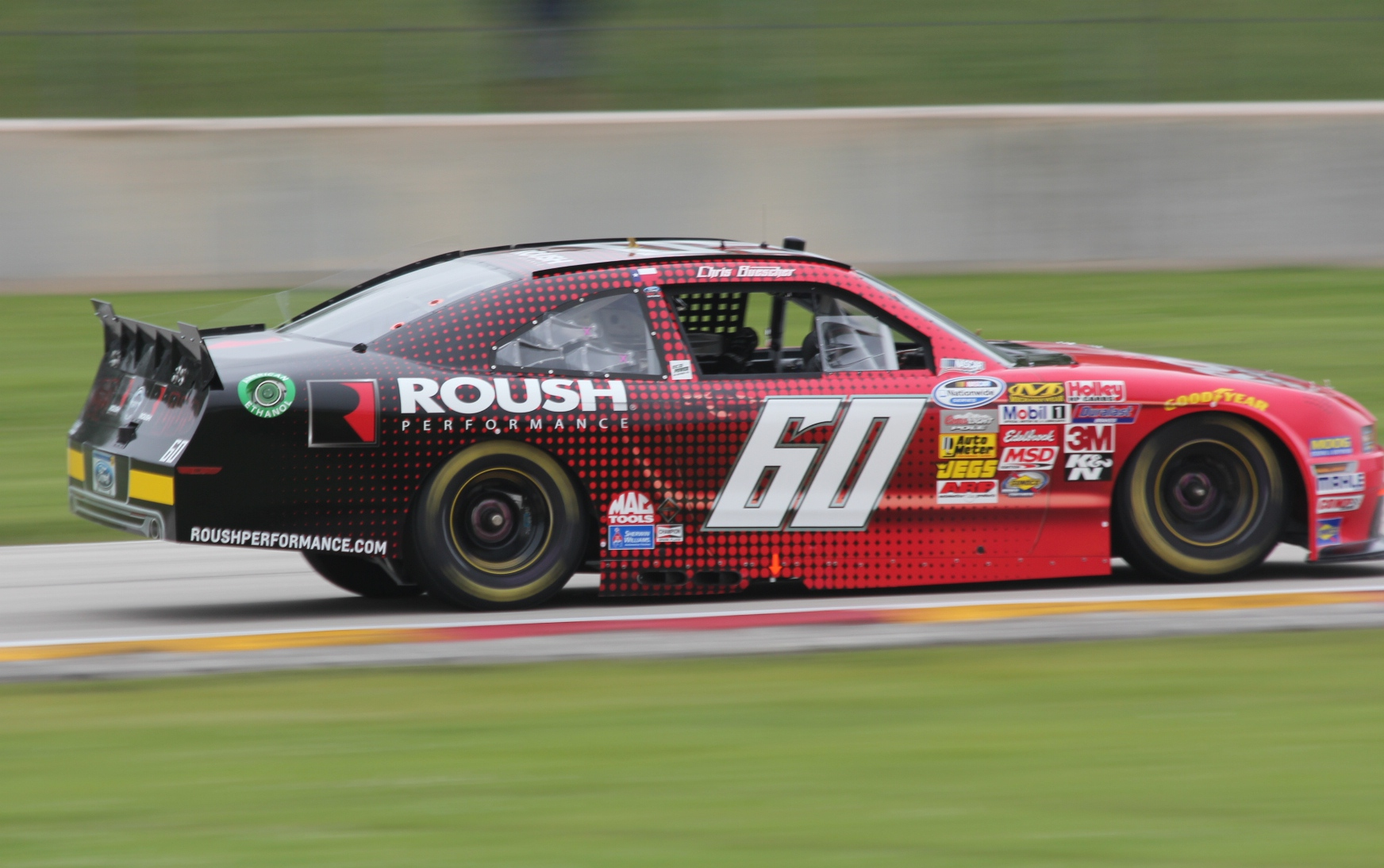
Buescher's 2014 Nationwide car at Road America

In 2014, Buescher moved full-time to the Nationwide Series, driving the No. 60 Ford for Roush Fenway Racing. After failing to qualify at Daytona, Buescher had a solid rookie season, finishing ninth at Las Vegas, seventh at Richmond, second at Talladega, ninth at Charlotte, eleventh at Dover, tenth at Michigan, and twelfth at the July Daytona race. Buescher finished fifth at New Hampshire to earn a spot in the second Nationwide Dash 4 Cash race at Chicagoland; he would finish eighth at Chicago and eleventh at Indianapolis. Fastenal returned to sponsor the 60 at Iowa, where Buescher finished fourteenth. Cup sponsors Kellogg's and Cheez-It sponsored the car at Watkins Glen. Buescher won the Nationwide Children's Hospital 200 at Mid-Ohio on August 16, his first career win.

Buescher returned to the No. 60 Ford in the newly renamed Xfinity Series for 2015. Buescher started the season with a runner-up finish to teammate Ryan Reed at Daytona in the Alert Today Florida 300. Then, Buescher followed up that second-place finish with another top-five finish, fourth, in the Hisense 250 at Atlanta, giving him a tie for the points lead with a fellow competitor Ty Dillon. Buescher scored the second series win of his career at Iowa Speedway after passing Chase Elliott for the lead on the final restart of the race, Elliott had led 114 laps but couldn't hold off a hard charge from Buescher. Two weeks later, Buescher would be back in victory lane at Dover International Speedway for his second win in 2015; However, Buescher made contact with teammate Bubba Wallace near the end of the race to make the winning pass and Wallace was upset with his teammate as he cut a tire as a result of the contact and would go on to say "I would say I am happy Roush won but I’m not."

In the final race of the 2015 season, Buescher won his first career NASCAR Xfinity Series Championship at Homestead–Miami Speedway on November 21, 2015. He finished eleventh in the race after receiving the Lucky Dog to get back on the lead lap. Kyle Larson won the race. Buescher was able to hold off defending champion (of the then Nationwide Series) Chase Elliott, Ty Dillon, and Regan Smith in points to win the title.

=== Cup Series ===
==== Front Row Motorsports (2015–2016) ====
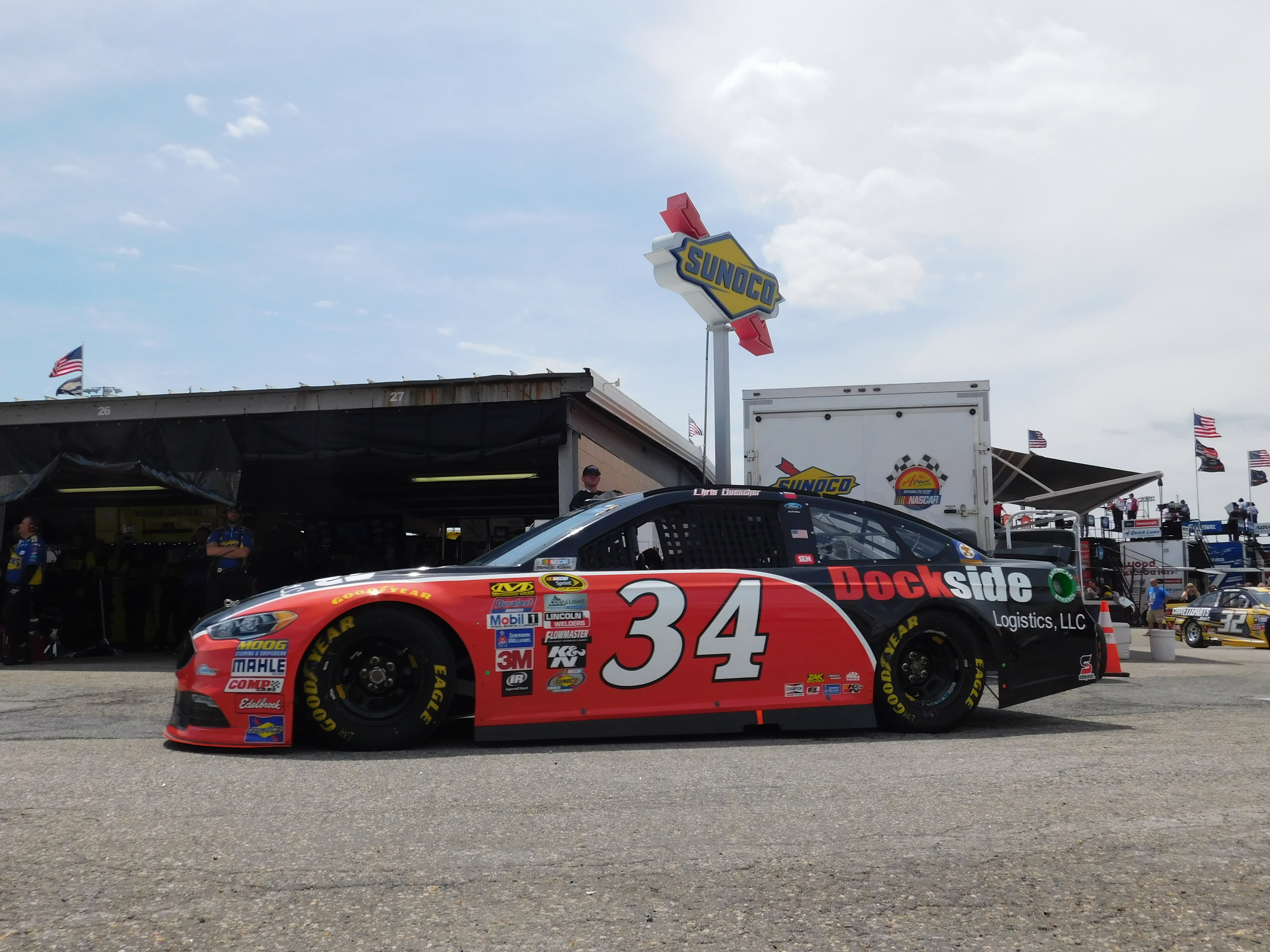
Buescher's 2016 Cup car at Dover International Speedway

Buescher made his Cup Series debut in the No. 34 Ford for Front Row Motorsports at California in 2015, filling in for David Ragan, who had been substituting for Kyle Busch, who was out for a fractured leg; Buescher finished 20th. Buescher ran five additional Cup races for FRM in 2015.

On December 10, 2015, it was announced that Buescher would move up to Sprint Cup to drive FRM's No. 34 full-time in 2016. Front Row entered an alliance with Roush Fenway.

Superspeedway wrecks plagued the No. 34 team. Buescher started the season with a hard crash at Daytona with Matt DiBenedetto, finishing 39th. He described this accident by calling it "the hardest hit of my career.” At Talladega, on lap 96, Buescher was involved in a crash that sent his car into a barrel roll, flipping three times before landing; he was not injured in the accident. Buescher also wrecked out of the summer Daytona race, finishing last.

Things began to turn around after Daytona, with Buescher finishing fourteenth in his rookie attempt at the Brickyard 400. One week later at Pocono, Buescher took the lead late in the Pennsylvania 400 by being on a different pit sequence. Buescher took the lead just before a massive cloud of fog moved over the track. After an hour of waiting, NASCAR gave up on trying to wait out the fog due to approaching severe weather and called the race, giving Buescher his first NASCAR Cup Series victory and the second win for Front Row Motorsports. Buescher, with the win, became the first driver since Joey Logano in 2009 to win a race as a Cup Series Rookie of the Year candidate (In 2011, Trevor Bayne won a race during his part-time rookie season but was not running for the Cup Series Rookie of the Year award). Buescher also became the first rookie to win at Pocono since Denny Hamlin in 2006. Buescher also brought Front Row Motorsports its first win in 118 races, going back to David Ragan at Talladega in 2013. Despite the win, Buescher was not automatically guaranteed a Chase position because he was outside the top thirty in driver points, the minimum standing required to qualify for the Chase. At Bristol, Buescher finished fifth to move into the 30th points position, moving past David Ragan. Buescher passed his teammate Landon Cassill for 29th in the standings at Richmond and locked in his place in the Chase.

He began the Chase in the thirteenth position in points. Buescher would be easily eliminated after the first round, though, due to underfunded equipment and poor finishes. He finished 28th at Chicagoland, 30th at New Hampshire, and 23rd at Dover.

==== JTG Daugherty Racing (2017–2019) ====
On November 29, 2016, Roush Fenway announced the sale of its charter for the No. 16 car to JTG Daugherty Racing, with Buescher taking over the new ride. The car was officially announced as No. 37 on December 12, 2016.

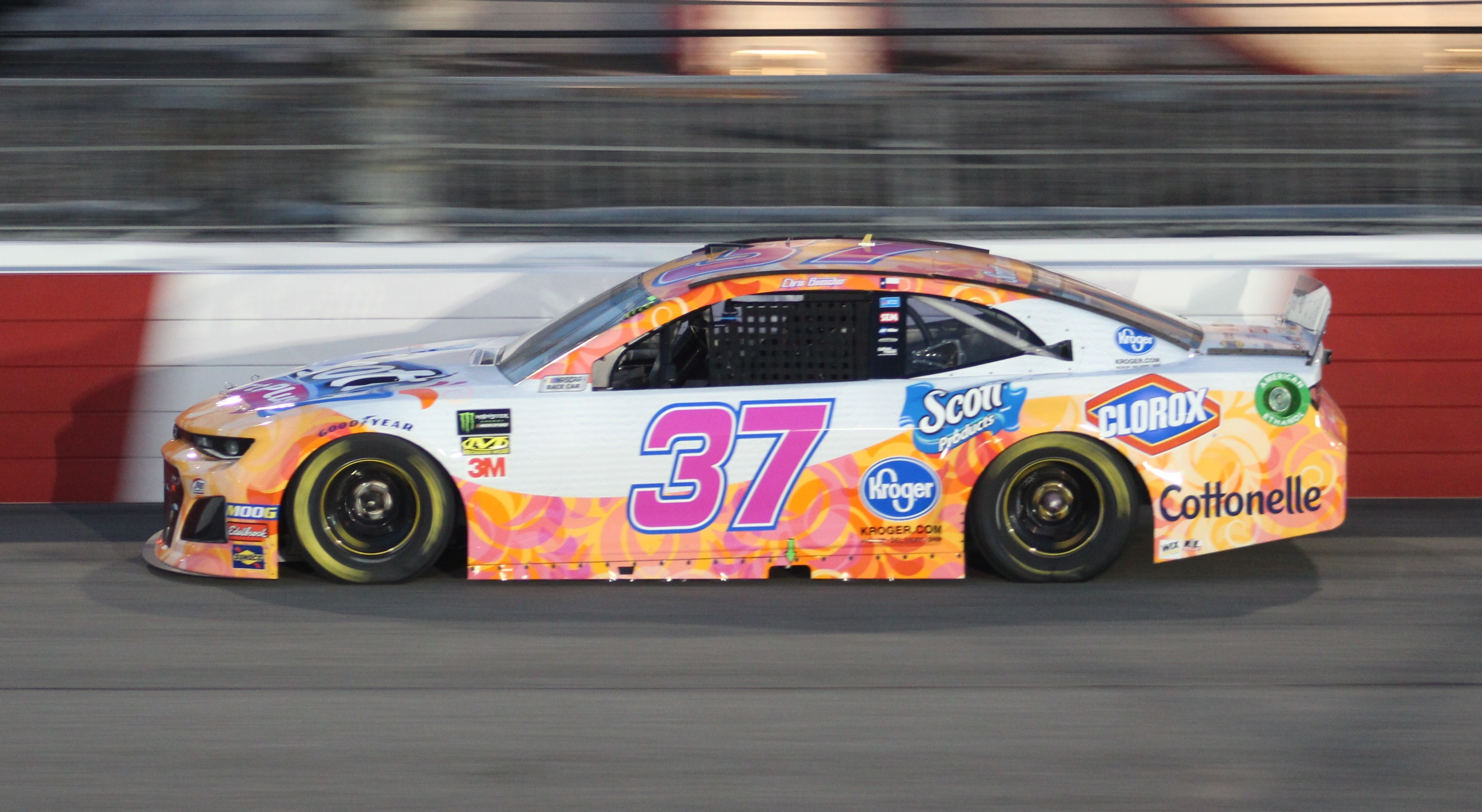
Buescher's 2019 Cup car at Richmond Raceway

Buescher began 2017 with a crash in the Daytona 500, finishing 35th. The next week at Atlanta, he finished 24th. In the next race, Las Vegas, he finished 23rd. He followed this up with a 27th-place outing at Phoenix and then 25th place at Auto Club. At Martinsville, Buescher scored a season-best eleventh-place finish, one spot shy of a third-career top-ten. He eventually scored his first top-ten with JTG at Daytona, finishing tenth. The Coke Zero 400 was also the first time both JTG Daugherty cars finished inside the top-ten, with teammate A. J. Allmendinger finishing 8th.

In 2018, Buescher would get his third career top-five at both the February Daytona 500 race and the July Daytona night race. He would be shy of three top-ten finishes in 2018, finishing in the eleventh–thirteenth position four times, and failed to finish thrice, once due to transmission failure. He ended the season 24th in points, two positions behind Allmendinger.

In 2019, Buescher scored the first consecutive top-ten finishes of his Cup Series career, as he followed up a tenth-place finish at the 2019 Digital Ally 400 at Kansas Speedway with a sixth-place result at the 2019 Coca-Cola 600. On September 25, 2019, Roush Fenway Racing announced that Buescher would replace Ricky Stenhouse Jr. in the No. 17 Ford in 2020.

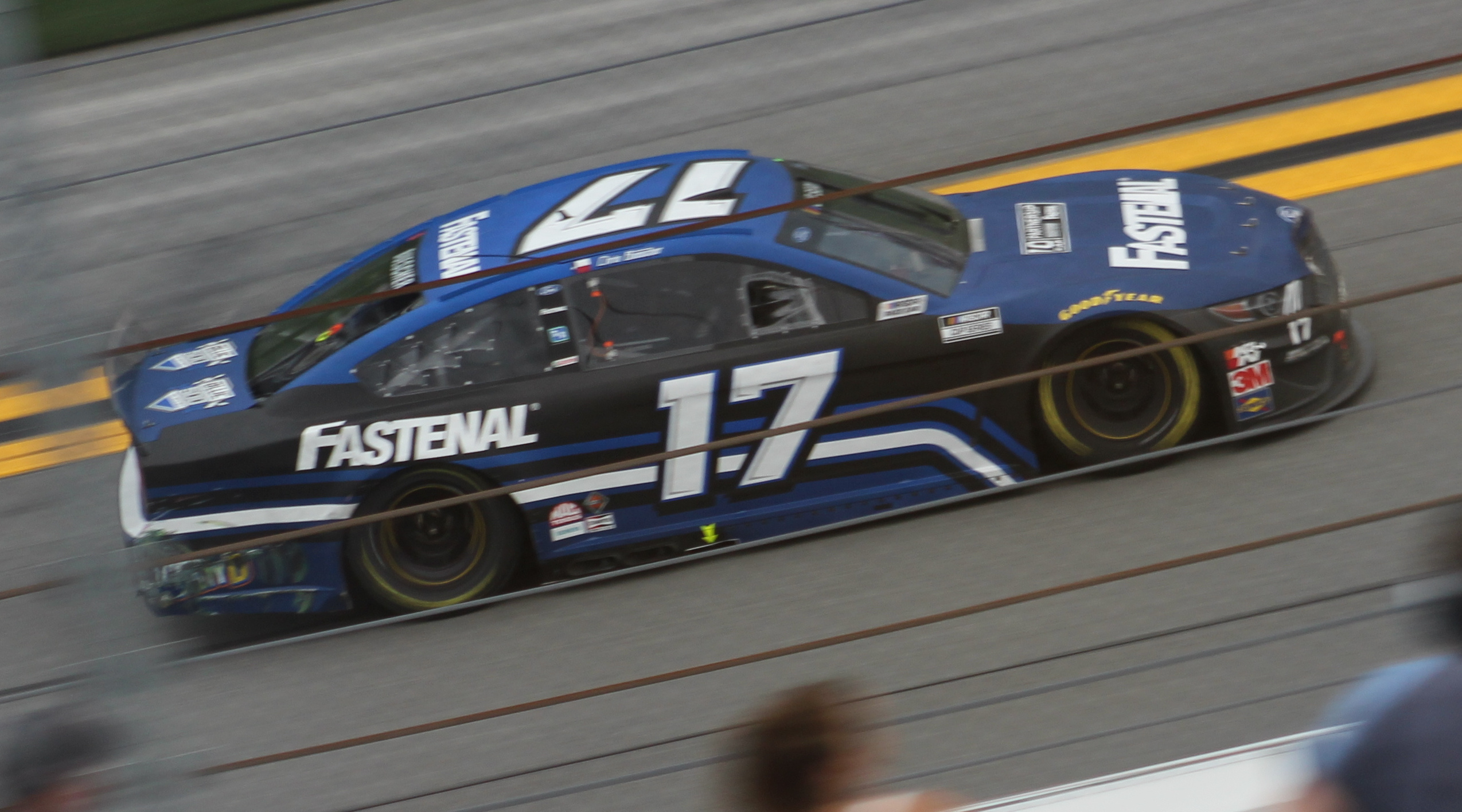
Buescher's 2020 Cup car at Daytona International Speedway

==== RFK Racing (2020–present) ====
Buescher started the 2020 season with a third-place finish at the 2020 Daytona 500. He struggled initially when returning from the COVID-19 pandemic, but scored a top-ten at Charlotte. Through the latter half of the regular season, Buescher scored four more top-tens, including fifth place at the inaugural Daytona Road Course race. Buescher would finish the season 21st in points, with a career-high eight top-tens throughout the season, doubling his previous best in a season, which was four.

Buescher displayed more consistency in his finishes during the 2021 season, staying within the top-twenty in the points standings. He finished second at the 2021 Coke Zero Sugar 400 at Daytona, but was disqualified when his car failed post-race inspection due to a rear sub-frame assembly violation.

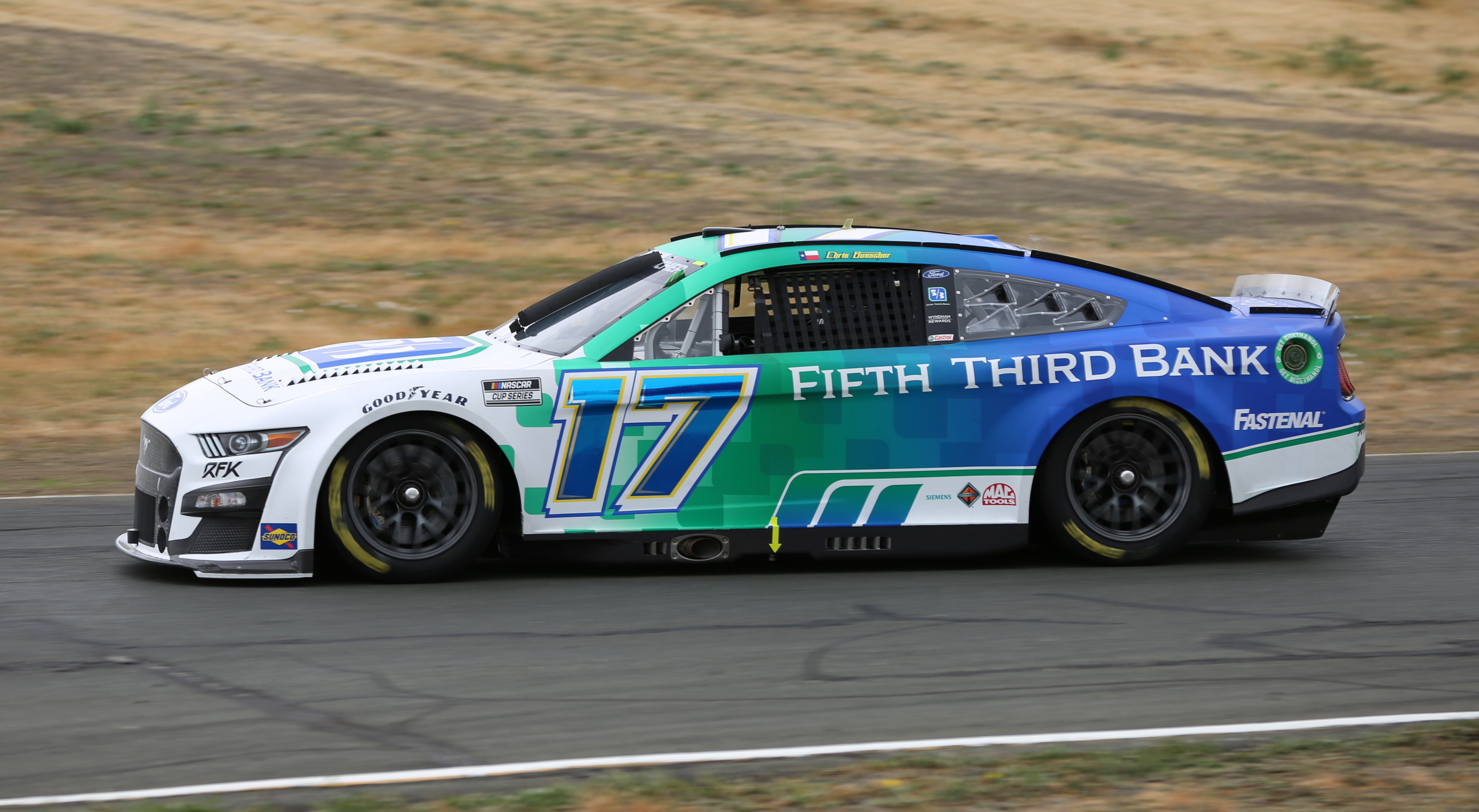
Buescher’s No. 17 car at Sonoma Raceway in 2022

Buescher started the 2022 season with a sixteenth-place finish at the 2022 Daytona 500. He also scored top-ten finishes at Phoenix, Atlanta, and Dover, where he recorded his first career Cup Series pole. At the Coca-Cola 600, Buescher was involved in a crash early in the final stage after he hit Daniel Suárez, who spun on the restart. Buescher's right front wheel dug into the tri-oval grass, lifting the car off the ground and sending it into a barrel roll. Buescher's car rolled five times before landing upside down. After his car was rolled back over by safety officials, Buescher walked out of the car under his own power. Buescher was forced to miss Gateway after testing positive for COVID-19; he was substituted with Zane Smith. A week later, Buescher returned to the No. 17 and finished second to Daniel Suárez at Sonoma. On June 28, 2022, crew chief Scott Graves was suspended for four races due to a tire and wheel loss at Nashville. Despite not making the playoffs, Buescher led a race-high 169 laps and managed to score his second career win at the Bristol night race, snapping a 222 race winless streak for himself and a five-year drought for the team.

Buescher began the 2023 season with a fourth-place finish at the 2023 Daytona 500. He held off Denny Hamlin to win at Richmond to make his first playoff appearance since 2016. Buescher would go back-to-back for the first time in his career and win the next week's race at Michigan, the first time RFK Racing had won two consecutive races since Carl Edwards won the final two races of the 2010 season. He then scored his third win at the Daytona night race. Buescher would advance to the Round of 12 in the playoffs and then to the Round of 8, both for the first time in his career. Despite failing to make the Championship 4, Buescher finished a career-best seventh in the points standings, with three wins, nine top fives, seventeen top tens, and an average finish of 12.2, all career highs.

Buescher started the 2024 season with an eighteenth-place finish at the 2024 Daytona 500. At Kansas, Buescher finished second to Kyle Larson by 0.001 seconds - the closest finish in NASCAR Cup Series history. The following week, during the 2024 Goodyear 400, Buescher was walled by Tyler Reddick in a fight for the win after Reddick dove to Buescher’s left in Turn 3. Reddick drifted high and contacted Buescher, who had nowhere to go but to bounce off the SAFER barrier to his right. Buescher unleashed his frustrations on him with a shove and a stern discussion, Reddick didn’t offer a defense for the contact and was apologetic after climbing out of his damaged No. 45 Toyota. Despite missing the playoffs, Buescher won at Watkins Glen after Shane van Gisbergen brushed the wall near the Bus Stop on the final lap.

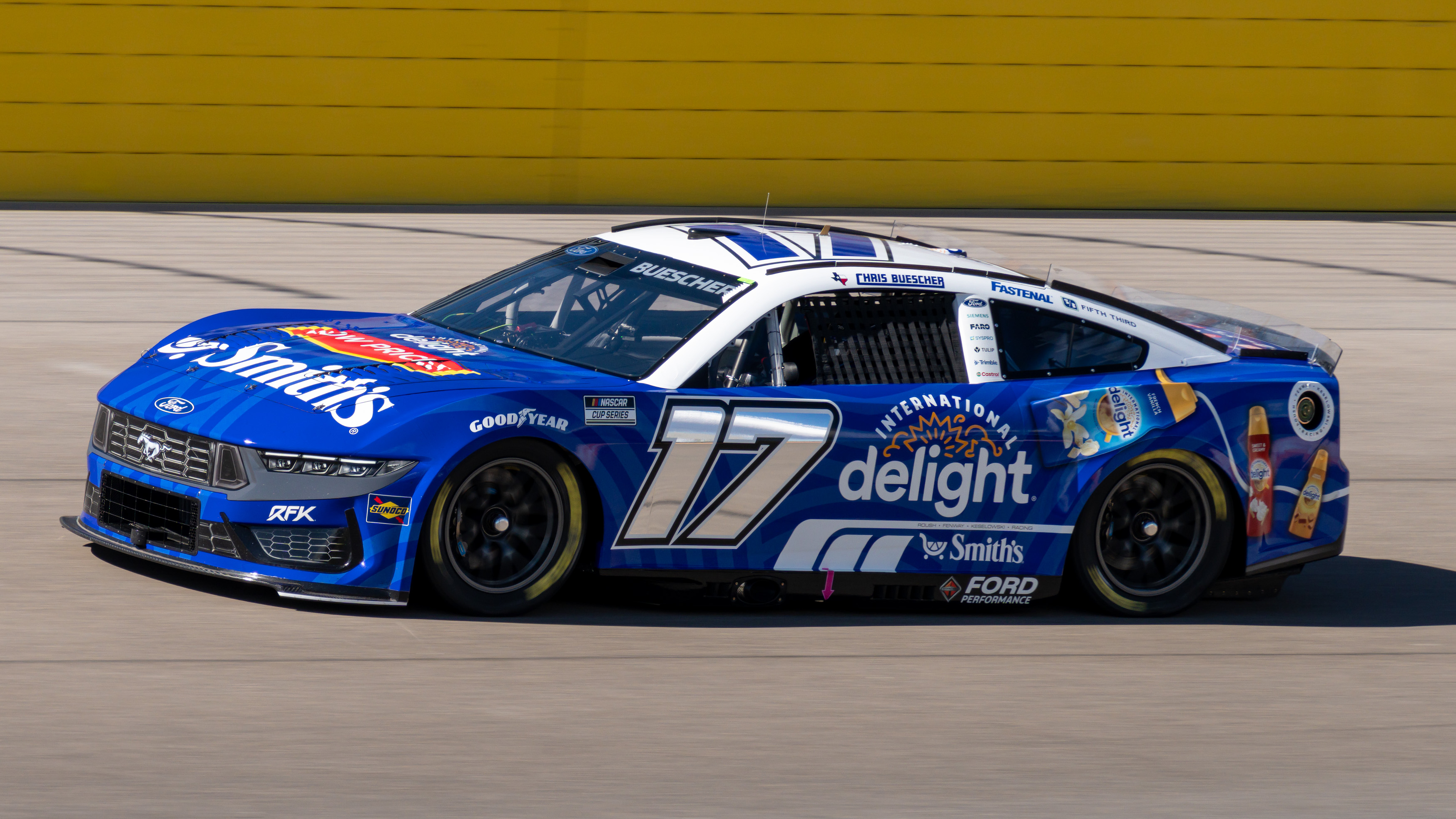
Buescher at Las Vegas for the 2025 South Point 400

Buescher started the 2025 season with a tenth-place finish at the 2025 Daytona 500. Following the Kansas race, the No. 17 car was issued an L1 penalty after R&D discovered the reinforcement behind the front bumper foam exceeded two inches. As a result, the team was docked sixty owner and driver points, five playoff points, and fined US$75,000, and Graves was suspended for two races. After the National Motorsports Appeals Panel heard the testimony, three members of the National Motorsports Appeals Panel ruled that the No. 17 team broke one or more, but not all, of the rules originally in the penalty. They decided to amend the L1 level penalty, which, after being amended, included a loss of thirty championship driver and owner points, from the original sixty point deduction, a loss of five driver and owner playoff points, a two-race suspension for Buescher's crew chief, and a US$75,000 fine for RFK Racing.

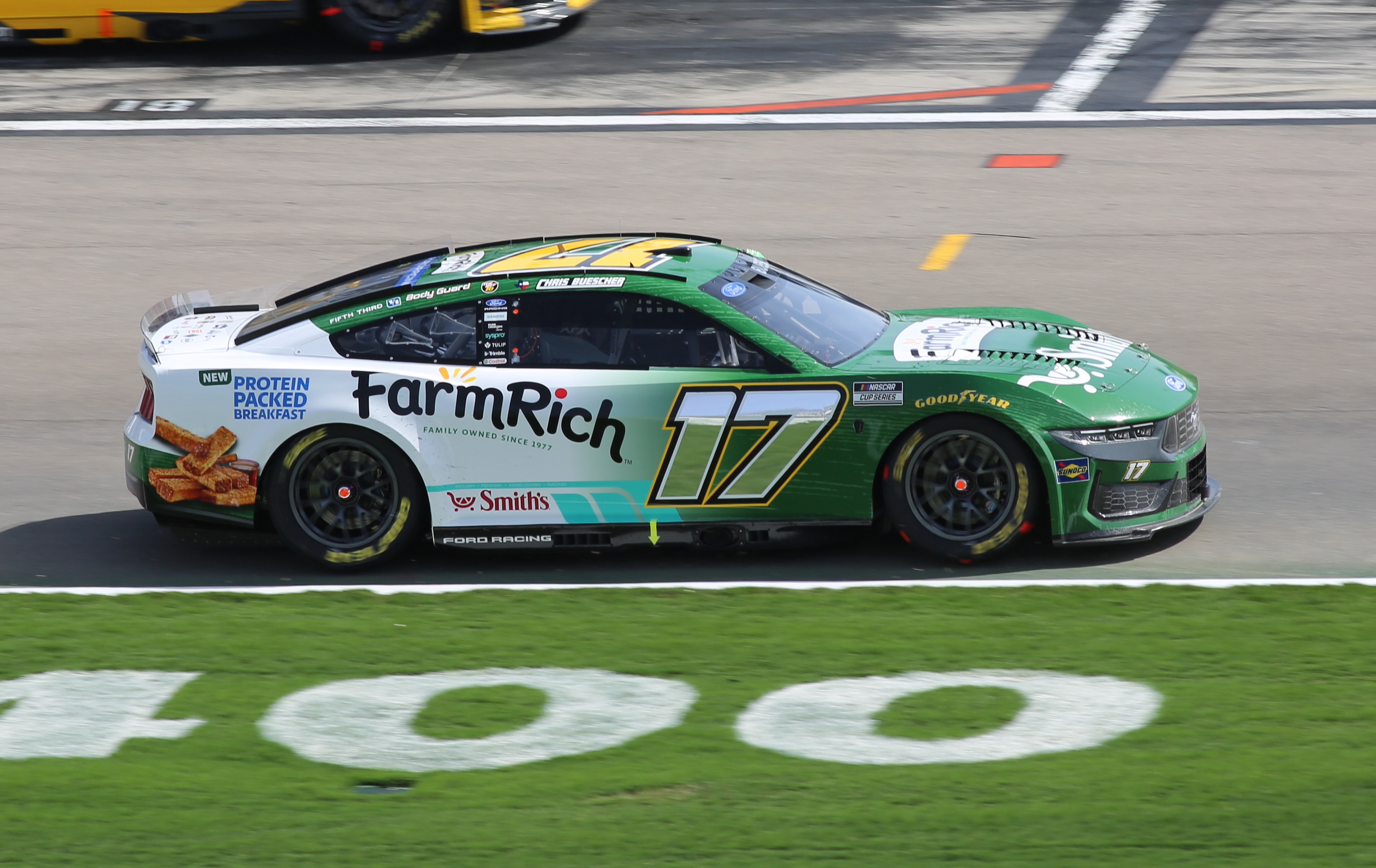
Buescher's No. 17 car at Las Vegas Motor Speedway in 2026

Buescher started the 2026 season with a seventh-place finish at the 2026 Daytona 500. Buescher signed a multi-year extension with RFK Racing on June 16.

== Personal life ==
Buescher married in 2018, during the Easter weekend in the NASCAR schedule. Buescher and his wife Emma live on a micro-farm near New London, North Carolina with their many pets and outdoor toys. They also volunteer with the local humane society in Albemarle.

== Motorsports career results ==
=== Stock car career summary ===
Season	Series	Team	Races	Wins	Top 5	Top 10	Points	Position
2009	ARCA Re/Max Series	Roulo Brothers Racing	7	0	3	5	1560	25th
2010	ARCA Racing Series	Roulo Brothers Racing	8	2	3	5	1625	20th
2011	NASCAR Nationwide Series	Roush Fenway Racing	2	0	0	0	54	57th
2011	ARCA Racing Series	Roulo Brothers Racing	19	3	14	16	4880	**2nd**
2012	ARCA Racing Series	Roulo Brothers Racing	19	4	12	16	4885	**1st**
2013	NASCAR Nationwide Series	Roush Fenway Racing	7	0	0	2	199	34th
2013	ARCA Racing Series	Roulo Brothers Racing	4	1	1	1	575	46th
2014	NASCAR Nationwide Series	Roush Fenway Racing	32	1	5	14	1014	7th
2015	NASCAR Cup Series	Front Row Motorsports	6	0	0	0	0	NC†
2015	NASCAR Xfinity Series	Roush Fenway Racing	33	2	11	20	1190	**1st**
2016	NASCAR Cup Series	Front Row Motorsports	36	1	2	2	2169	16th
2017	NASCAR Cup Series	JTG Daugherty Racing	36	0	0	4	564	25th
2018	NASCAR Cup Series	JTG Daugherty Racing	36	0	2	2	585	24th
2019	NASCAR Cup Series	JTG Daugherty Racing	36	0	0	4	729	20th
2020	NASCAR Cup Series	Roush Fenway Racing	36	0	2	8	645	21st
2021	NASCAR Cup Series	Roush Fenway Racing	36	0	1	8	771	19th
2022	NASCAR Cup Series	RFK Racing	35	1	3	10	727	21st
2023	NASCAR Cup Series	RFK Racing	36	3	9	17	2310	7th
2024	NASCAR Cup Series	RFK Racing	36	1	6	15	930	17th
2025	NASCAR Cup Series	RFK Racing	36	0	5	16	889	17th
2025	NASCAR Craftsman Truck Series	ThorSport Racing	1	0	0	0	0	NC†
2026	NASCAR Cup Series	RFK Racing	36	0	2	11	2212	16th

^{†} Ineligible for championship points.

=== NASCAR ===
(key) (Bold – Pole position awarded by qualifying time. Italics – Pole position earned by points standings or practice time. * – Most laps led.)

==== Cup Series ====
NASCAR Cup Series results
Year	Team	No.	Make	1	2	3	4	5	6	7	8	9	10	11	12	13	14	15	16	17	18	19	20	21	22	23	24	25	26	27	28	29	30	31	32	33	34	35	36	NCSC	Pts	Ref
2015	Front Row Motorsports	34	Ford	DAY	ATL	LVS	PHO	CAL; 20	MAR; 24	TEX; 30	BRI; 25	RCH	TAL; 24	KAN	CLT	DOV	POC	MCH	SON	DAY	KEN	NHA	IND	POC	GLN; 37	MCH	BRI	DAR	RCH	CHI	NHA	DOV	CLT	KAN	TAL	MAR	TEX	PHO	HOM	62nd	0^{1}	
2016	Front Row Motorsports	34	Ford	DAY; 39	ATL; 28	LVS; 26	PHO; 30	CAL; 33	MAR; 33	TEX; 28	BRI; 21	RCH; 34	TAL; 37	KAN; 24	DOV; 18	CLT; 37	POC; 25	MCH; 20	SON; 30	DAY; 40	KEN; 37	NHA; 29	IND; 14	POC; 1	GLN; 30	BRI; 5	MCH; 35	DAR; 17	RCH; 24	CHI; 28	NHA; 30	DOV; 23	CLT; 16	KAN; 21	TAL; 22	MAR; 27	TEX; 21	PHO; 32	HOM; 24	16th	2169	
2017	JTG Daugherty Racing	37	Chevy	DAY; 35	ATL; 24	LVS; 23	PHO; 27	CAL; 25	MAR; 11	TEX; 21	BRI; 39	RCH; 17	TAL; 15	KAN; 18	CLT; 20	DOV; 23	POC; 19	MCH; 36	SON; 19	DAY; 10	KEN; 16	NHA; 25	IND; 9	POC; 28	GLN; 11	MCH; 6	BRI; 27	DAR; 17	RCH; 32	CHI; 27	NHA; 21	DOV; 30	CLT; 18	TAL; 17	KAN; 6	MAR; 21	TEX; 22	PHO; 37	HOM; 20	25th	564	
2018	JTG Daugherty Racing	37	Chevy	DAY; 5	ATL; 25	LVS; 15	PHO; 29	CAL; 30	MAR; 23	TEX; 15	BRI; 36	RCH; 26	TAL; 11	DOV; 20	KAN; 34	CLT; 29	POC; 17	MCH; 24	SON; 12	CHI; 22	DAY; 5	KEN; 23	NHA; 20	POC; 37	GLN; 20	MCH; 20	BRI; 19	DAR; 13	IND; 25	LVS; 15	RCH; 30	ROV; 17	DOV; 25	TAL; 21	KAN; 16	MAR; 13	TEX; 23	PHO; 18	HOM; 23	24th	585	
2019	JTG Daugherty Racing	37	Chevy	DAY; 37	ATL; 9	LVS; 18	PHO; 16	CAL; 16	MAR; 21	TEX; 20	BRI; 22	RCH; 22	TAL; 30	DOV; 23	KAN; 10	CLT; 6	POC; 14	MCH; 16	SON; 16	CHI; 18	DAY; 17	KEN; 10	NHA; 15	POC; 16	GLN; 13	MCH; 14	BRI; 17	DAR; 12	IND; 15	LVS; 18	RCH; 31	ROV; 18	DOV; 36	TAL; 20	KAN; 13	MAR; 12	TEX; 19	PHO; 16	HOM; 16	20th	729	
2020	Roush Fenway Racing	17	Ford	DAY; 3	LVS; 14	CAL; 16	PHO; 17	DAR; 32	DAR; 23	CLT; 10	CLT; 22	BRI; 23	ATL; 22	MAR; 13	HOM; 23	TAL; 6	POC; 10	POC; 36	IND; 31	KEN; 20	TEX; 19	KAN; 33	NHA; 25	MCH; 20	MCH; 20	DRC; 5	DOV; 16	DOV; 14	DAY; 9	DAR; 26	RCH; 24	BRI; 8	LVS; 9	TAL; 22	ROV; 20	KAN; 21	TEX; 34	MAR; 38	PHO; 20	21st	645	
2021	Roush Fenway Racing	17	Ford	DAY; 31	DRC; 11	HOM; 19	LVS; 14	PHO; 18	ATL; 7	BRD; 14	MAR; 13	RCH; 25	TAL; 21	KAN; 8	DAR; 9	DOV; 17	COA; 13	CLT; 8	SON; 16	NSH; 36	POC; 20	POC; 19	ROA; 18	ATL; 16	NHA; 29	GLN; 17	IRC; 12	MCH; 15	DAY; 40	DAR; 9	RCH; 24	BRI; 23	LVS; 25	TAL; 6	ROV; 3	TEX; 21	KAN; 12	MAR; 9	PHO; 25	19th	771	
2022	RFK Racing	17	Ford	DAY; 16	CAL; 35	LVS; 18	PHO; 10	ATL; 7	COA; 21	RCH; 15	MAR; 15	BRD; 15	TAL; 38	**DOV**; 8	DAR; 16	KAN; 27	CLT; 26	GTW	SON; 2	NSH; 30	ROA; 6	ATL; 33	NHA; 17	POC; 29	IRC; 10	MCH; 16	RCH; 3	GLN; 9	DAY; 27	DAR; 26	KAN; 15	BRI; 1*	TEX; 30	TAL; 25	ROV; 6	LVS; 15	HOM; 13	MAR; 24	PHO; 21	21st	727	
2023	RFK Racing	17	Ford	DAY; 4	CAL; 13	LVS; 21	PHO; 15	ATL; 35	COA; 8	RCH; 30	BRD; 18	MAR; 14	TAL; 3	DOV; 9	KAN; 17	DAR; 10	CLT; 8	GTW; 12	SON; 4	NSH; 18	CSC; 10	ATL; 15	NHA; 15	POC; 18	RCH; 1	MCH; 1*	IRC; 11	GLN; 7	DAY; 1	DAR; 3	KAN; 27	BRI; 4	TEX; 14	TAL; 19	ROV; 7	LVS; 11	HOM; 21	MAR; 8	PHO; 5	7th	2310	
2024	RFK Racing	17	Ford	DAY; 18	ATL; 9	LVS; 37	PHO; 2	BRI; 7	COA; 8	RCH; 9	MAR; 15	TEX; 15	TAL; 25	DOV; 17	KAN; 2	DAR; 30	CLT; 23	GTW; 14	SON; 3	IOW; 18	NHA; 5	NSH; 5	CSC; 20	POC; 11	IND; 22	RCH; 18	MCH; 6	DAY; 10	DAR; 6	ATL; 36	GLN; 1	BRI; 14	KAN; 11	TAL; 17	ROV; 17	LVS; 10	HOM; 15	MAR; 30	PHO; 9	17th	930	
2025	RFK Racing	17	Ford	DAY; 10	ATL; 30	COA; 7	PHO; 5	LVS; 13	HOM; 6	MAR; 24	DAR; 6	BRI; 25	TAL; 34	TEX; 18	KAN; 8	CLT; 22	NSH; 14	MCH; 2	MXC; 10	POC; 4	ATL; 9	CSC; 18	SON; 16	DOV; 9	IND; 14	IOW; 22	GLN; 3	RCH; 30	DAY; 7	DAR; 10	GTW; 9	BRI; 11	NHA; 18	KAN; 15	ROV; 4	LVS; 12	TAL; 30	MAR; 29	PHO; 12	17th	889	
2026	RFK Racing	17	Ford	DAY; 7	ATL; 15	COA; 24	PHO; 14	LVS; 6	DAR; 9	MAR; 19	BRI; 13	KAN; 10	TAL; 2	TEX; 5	GLN; 12	CLT; 30	NSH; 29	MCH; 9	POC; 7	COR; 6	SON; 19	CHI; 19	ATL; 10	NWS; 20	IND; 11	IOW; 13	RCH; 21	NHA; 18	DAY; 40	DAR; 20	GTW; 27	BRI; 13	KAN; 23	LVS; 13	CLT; 10	PHO; 22	TAL; 32*	MAR; 24	HOM; 24	16th	2212	

===== Daytona 500 =====
Year	Team	Manufacturer	Start	Finish
2016	Front Row Motorsports	Ford	17	39
2017	JTG Daugherty Racing	Chevrolet	37	35
2018	JTG Daugherty Racing	Chevrolet	21	5
2019	JTG Daugherty Racing	Chevrolet	15	37
2020	Roush Fenway Racing	Ford	19	3
2021	Roush Fenway Racing	Ford	22	31
2022	RFK Racing	Ford	4	16
2023	RFK Racing	Ford	9	4
2024	RFK Racing	Ford	19	18
2025	RFK Racing	Ford	6	10
2026	RFK Racing	Ford	41	7

==== Xfinity Series ====
NASCAR Xfinity Series results
Year	Team	No.	Make	1	2	3	4	5	6	7	8	9	10	11	12	13	14	15	16	17	18	19	20	21	22	23	24	25	26	27	28	29	30	31	32	33	34	NXSC	Pts	Ref
2011	Roush Fenway Racing	16	Ford	DAY	PHO	LVS	BRI	CAL	TEX	TAL	NSH	RCH; 17	DAR; 17	DOV	IOW	CLT	CHI	MCH	ROA	DAY	KEN	NHA	NSH	IRP	IOW	GLN	CGV	BRI	ATL	RCH	CHI	DOV	KAN	CLT	TEX	PHO	HOM	57th	54	
2013	Roush Fenway Racing	16	Ford	DAY	PHO	LVS	BRI; 7	CAL	TEX; 17	RCH	TAL	DAR; 12	CLT; 38	DOV	IOW	MCH; 7	ROA	KEN	DAY	NHA	CHI	IND	IOW	GLN			ATL; 13	RCH	CHI	KEN	DOV	KAN; 16	CLT	TEX	PHO	HOM		34th	199	
2013	Roush Fenway Racing	6	Ford																						MOH; QL^{†}	BRI												34th	199	
2014	Roush Fenway Racing	60	Ford	DAY; DNQ	PHO; 15	LVS; 9	BRI; 16	CAL; 14	TEX; 27	DAR; 34	RCH; 7	TAL; 2	IOW; 13	CLT; 9	DOV; 11	MCH; 10	ROA; 18	KEN; 18	DAY; 12	NHA; 5	CHI; 8	IND; 11	IOW; 14	GLN; 29	MOH; 1	BRI; 10	ATL; 13	RCH; 10	CHI; 12	KEN; 7	DOV; 4	KAN; 28	CLT; 6	TEX; 13	PHO; 12	HOM; 5		7th	1014	
2015	Roush Fenway Racing	60	Ford	DAY; 2	ATL; 4	LVS; 14	PHO; 14	CAL; 5	TEX; 9	BRI; 3	RCH; 20	TAL; 6	IOW; 1	CLT; 11	DOV; 1	MCH; 4	CHI; 5	DAY; 12	KEN; 11	NHA; 14	IND; 16	IOW; 13	GLN; 3	MOH; 4	BRI; 11*	ROA; 9	DAR; 5	RCH; 10	CHI; 7	KEN; 7	DOV; 8	CLT; 7	KAN; 6	TEX; 11	PHO; 13	HOM; 11		1st	1190	
^{†} – Qualified for Trevor Bayne

==== Craftsman Truck Series ====
NASCAR Craftsman Truck Series results
Year	Team	No.	Make	1	2	3	4	5	6	7	8	9	10	11	12	13	14	15	16	17	18	19	20	21	22	23	24	25	NCTC	Pts	Ref
2025	ThorSport Racing	66	Ford	DAY	ATL	LVS	HOM	MAR	BRI	CAR	TEX	KAN	NWS	CLT	NSH	MCH	POC	LRP	IRP	GLN; 22	RCH	DAR	BRI	NHA	ROV	TAL	MAR	PHO	101st	0^{1}	

^{*} Season still in progress
^{1} Ineligible for series points

=== ARCA Racing Series ===
(key) (Bold – Pole position awarded by qualifying time. Italics – Pole position earned by points standings or practice time. * – Most laps led.)

ARCA Racing Series results
Year	Team	No.	Make	1	2	3	4	5	6	7	8	9	10	11	12	13	14	15	16	17	18	19	20	21	ARSC	Pts	Ref
2009	Roulo Brothers Racing	17	Ford	DAY	SLM; 4	CAR	TAL	KEN	TOL; 17	POC	MCH	MFD; 3	IOW; 4	KEN	BLN	POC	ISF	CHI	TOL; 8	DSF	NJE	**SLM**; 21	KAN	CAR; 6	25th	1560	
2010	Roulo Brothers Racing	17	Ford	DAY	PBE	SLM; 12	TEX	TAL	**TOL**; 1*	POC	MCH	IOW; 11	**MFD**; 7	POC	BLN	NJE; 3	ISF	CHI	DSF	TOL; 1	SLM; 11	KAN	CAR; 7		20th	1625	
2011	Roulo Brothers Racing	17	Ford	DAY; 2	TAL; 5	SLM; 22	TOL; 5	NJE; 15	CHI; 2	POC; 2	MCH; 5	WIN; 2	BLN; 7	IOW; 3	IRP; 22	POC; 3	ISF; 8	MAD; 2*	DSF; 1	SLM; 1*	KAN; 2	TOL; 1			2nd	4880	
2012	Roulo Brothers Racing	17	Ford	DAY; 20	MOB; 6	**SLM**; 7	TAL; 17	TOL; 1*	ELK; 3	POC; 5	MCH; 1	**WIN**; 4	NJE; 3	IOW; 13	CHI; 4	IRP; 7	POC; 5	BLN; 1	ISF; 5	MAD; 1*	SLM; 2	DSF; C	KAN; 8		1st	4885	
2013	Roulo Brothers Racing	17	Ford	DAY; 30	MOB	SLM	TAL	TOL	ELK	POC	MCH														46th	575	
2013	Roulo Brothers Racing	99	Ford									ROA; 1	WIN	CHI	NJE; 22	POC	BLN	ISF	MAD	DSF	IOW	SLM; 18	KEN	KAN	46th	575	

Sporting positions
Preceded by Ty Dillon	ARCA Racing Series Champion; 2012	Succeeded by Frank Kimmel
Preceded by Chase Elliott	NASCAR Xfinity Series Champion; 2015	Succeeded by Daniel Suárez
