= 2024 Go Bowling at The Glen =

Race details
- Race 28 of 36 in the 2024 NASCAR Cup Series
- Date: September 15, 2024
- Location: Watkins Glen International in Watkins Glen, New York
- Course: Permanent racing facility
- Course length: 2.54 miles (4.08 km)
- Distance: 92 laps, 233.68 mi (375.795 km)
- Scheduled distance: 90 laps, 220.5 mi (354.6 km)
- Weather: Sunny with a temperature around 83 °F (28 °C); wind out of the south at 4 miles per hour (6.4 km/h).
- Average speed: 85.226 miles per hour (137.158 km/h)

Pole position
Driver	Ross Chastain	Trackhouse Racing
- Time: 1:12.130

Most laps led
Driver	Ross Chastain	Trackhouse Racing
- Laps: 52

Winner
No. 17	Chris Buescher	RFK Racing

Television in the United States
- Network: USA
- Announcers: Leigh Diffey, Steve Letarte (booth), Mike Bagley (Esses), Dillon Welch (Turn 5), and Jeff Burton (Turns 6–7)
- Nielsen ratings: 1.8 million

Radio in the United States
- Radio: MRN
- Booth announcers: Alex Hayden, Jeff Striegle and Todd Gordon
- Turn announcers: Dave Moody (Esses), Kyle Rickey (Turn 5) and Jason Toy (Turns 6–7)

The 2024 Go Bowling at The Glen was a NASCAR Cup Series race that was held on September 15, 2024, at Watkins Glen International in Watkins Glen, New York. Contested over 92 laps—extended from 90 laps due to an overtime finish on the 2.45-mile (3.94 km) road course, it was the 28th race of the 2024 NASCAR Cup Series season, the second of the 2024 NASCAR playoffs, and the second race of the Round of 16. Chris Buescher won the race, his first win since the 2023 Coke Zero Sugar 400. Shane van Gisbergen finished 2nd, and rookie Carson Hocevar finished 3rd. Ross Chastain and Zane Smith rounded out the top five, and Chase Briscoe, Michael McDowell, Corey LaJoie, Ryan Preece, and Austin Cindric rounded out the top ten.

== Report ==
=== Background ===
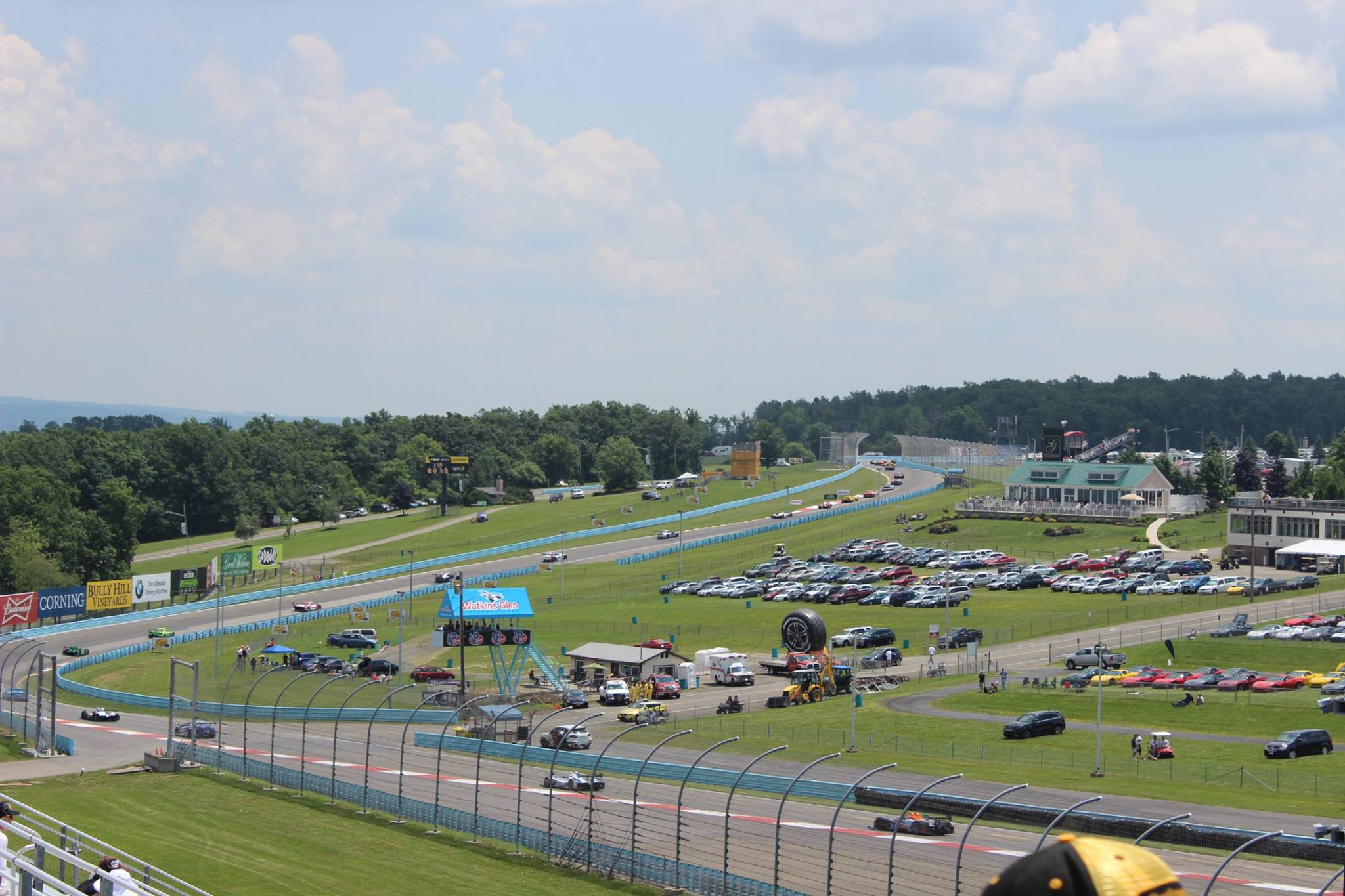
Watkins Glen International

Watkins Glen International (nicknamed "The Glen") is an automobile race track located in Watkins Glen, New York at the southern tip of Seneca Lake. It was long known around the world as the home of the Formula One United States Grand Prix, which it hosted for twenty consecutive years (1961–1980), but the site has been home to road racing of nearly every class, including the World Sportscar Championship, Trans-Am, Can-Am, NASCAR Cup Series, the International Motor Sports Association and the IndyCar Series.

Initially, public roads in the village were used for the race course. In 1956 a permanent circuit for the race was built. In 1968 the race was extended to six hours, becoming the 6 Hours of Watkins Glen. The circuit's current layout has more or less been the same since 1971, although a chicane was installed at the uphill Esses in 1975 to slow cars through these corners, where there was a fatality during practice at the 1973 United States Grand Prix. The chicane was removed in 1985, but another chicane called the "Inner Loop" was installed in 1992 after J.D. McDuffie's fatal accident during the previous year's NASCAR Winston Cup event.

The circuit is known as the Mecca of North American road racing and is a very popular venue among fans and drivers. The facility is currently owned by NASCAR.

==== Entry list ====
- (R) denotes rookie driver.
- (P) denotes playoff driver.
- (i) denotes driver who is ineligible for series driver points.

No.	Driver	Team	Manufacturer
1	Ross Chastain	Trackhouse Racing	Chevrolet
2	Austin Cindric (P)	Team Penske	Ford
3	Austin Dillon	Richard Childress Racing	Chevrolet
4	Josh Berry (R)	Stewart-Haas Racing	Ford
5	Kyle Larson (P)	Hendrick Motorsports	Chevrolet
6	Brad Keselowski (P)	RFK Racing	Ford
7	Corey LaJoie	Spire Motorsports	Chevrolet
8	Kyle Busch	Richard Childress Racing	Chevrolet
9	Chase Elliott (P)	Hendrick Motorsports	Chevrolet
10	Noah Gragson	Stewart-Haas Racing	Ford
11	Denny Hamlin (P)	Joe Gibbs Racing	Toyota
12	Ryan Blaney (P)	Team Penske	Ford
13	A. J. Allmendinger (i)	Kaulig Racing	Chevrolet
14	Chase Briscoe (P)	Stewart-Haas Racing	Ford
15	Kaz Grala (R)	Rick Ware Racing	Ford
16	Shane van Gisbergen (i)	Kaulig Racing	Chevrolet
17	Chris Buescher	RFK Racing	Ford
19	Martin Truex Jr. (P)	Joe Gibbs Racing	Toyota
20	Christopher Bell (P)	Joe Gibbs Racing	Toyota
21	Harrison Burton (P)	Wood Brothers Racing	Ford
22	Joey Logano (P)	Team Penske	Ford
23	Bubba Wallace	23XI Racing	Toyota
24	William Byron (P)	Hendrick Motorsports	Chevrolet
31	Daniel Hemric	Kaulig Racing	Chevrolet
34	Michael McDowell	Front Row Motorsports	Ford
38	Todd Gilliland	Front Row Motorsports	Ford
41	Ryan Preece	Stewart-Haas Racing	Ford
42	John Hunter Nemechek	Legacy Motor Club	Toyota
43	Erik Jones	Legacy Motor Club	Toyota
45	Tyler Reddick (P)	23XI Racing	Toyota
47	Ricky Stenhouse Jr.	JTG Daugherty Racing	Chevrolet
48	Alex Bowman (P)	Hendrick Motorsports	Chevrolet
50	Juan Pablo Montoya	23XI Racing	Toyota
51	Justin Haley	Rick Ware Racing	Ford
54	Ty Gibbs (P)	Joe Gibbs Racing	Toyota
71	Zane Smith (R)	Spire Motorsports	Chevrolet
77	Carson Hocevar (R)	Spire Motorsports	Chevrolet
99	Daniel Suárez (P)	Trackhouse Racing	Chevrolet
Official entry list

== Practice ==
Tyler Reddick was the fastest in the practice session with a time of 1:12.018 seconds and a speed of 122.469 mph (197.095 km/h).

=== Practice results ===
Pos	No.	Driver	Team	Manufacturer	Time	Speed
1	45	Tyler Reddick (P)	23XI Racing	Toyota	1:12.018	122.469
2	1	Ross Chastain	Trackhouse Racing	Chevrolet	1:12.096	122.337
3	5	Kyle Larson (P)	Hendrick Motorsports	Chevrolet	1:12.120	122.296
Official practice results

== Qualifying ==
Ross Chastain scored the pole for the race with a time of 1:12.130 and a speed of 122.279 mph (196.789 km/h).

=== Qualifying results ===
Pos	No.	Driver	Team	Manufacturer	R1	R2
1	1	Ross Chastain	Trackhouse Racing	Chevrolet	1:12.321	1:12.130
2	19	Martin Truex Jr. (P)	Joe Gibbs Racing	Toyota	1:11.811	1:12.264
3	16	Shane van Gisbergen (i)	Kaulig Racing	Chevrolet	1:12.227	1:12.376
4	48	Alex Bowman (P)	Hendrick Motorsports	Chevrolet	1:12.015	1:12.388
5	2	Austin Cindric (P)	Team Penske	Ford	1:12.042	1:12.426
6	13	A. J. Allmendinger (i)	Kaulig Racing	Chevrolet	1:12.119	1:12.482
7	22	Joey Logano (P)	Team Penske	Ford	1:12.515	1:12.658
8	99	Daniel Suárez (P)	Trackhouse Racing	Chevrolet	1:12.110	1:12.757
9	10	Noah Gragson	Stewart-Haas Racing	Ford	1:12.547	1:12.982
10	34	Michael McDowell	Front Row Motorsports	Ford	1:12.602	1:13.052
11	24	William Byron (P)	Hendrick Motorsports	Chevrolet	1:12.148	—
12	14	Chase Briscoe (P)	Stewart-Haas Racing	Ford	1:12.619	—
13	8	Kyle Busch	Richard Childress Racing	Chevrolet	1:12.188	—
14	9	Chase Elliott (P)	Hendrick Motorsports	Chevrolet	1:12.620	—
15	54	Ty Gibbs (P)	Joe Gibbs Racing	Toyota	1:12.229	—
16	45	Tyler Reddick (P)	23XI Racing	Toyota	1:12.626	—
17	20	Christopher Bell (P)	Joe Gibbs Racing	Toyota	1:12.388	—
18	7	Corey LaJoie	Spire Motorsports	Chevrolet	1:12.701	—
19	71	Zane Smith (R)	Spire Motorsports	Chevrolet	1:12.452	—
20	5	Kyle Larson (P)	Hendrick Motorsports	Chevrolet	1:12.704	—
21	41	Ryan Preece	Stewart-Haas Racing	Ford	1:12.517	—
22	11	Denny Hamlin (P)	Joe Gibbs Racing	Toyota	1:12.759	—
23	3	Austin Dillon	Richard Childress Racing	Chevrolet	1:12.520	—
24	17	Chris Buescher	RFK Racing	Ford	1:12.860	—
25	43	Erik Jones	Legacy Motor Club	Toyota	1:12.742	—
26	47	Ricky Stenhouse Jr.	JTG Daugherty Racing	Chevrolet	1:12.905	—
27	31	Daniel Hemric	Kaulig Racing	Chevrolet	1:12.879	—
28	6	Brad Keselowski (P)	RFK Racing	Ford	1:13.067	—
29	77	Carson Hocevar (R)	Spire Motorsports	Chevrolet	1:12.961	—
30	12	Ryan Blaney (P)	Team Penske	Ford	1:13.076	—
31	4	Josh Berry (R)	Stewart-Haas Racing	Ford	1:13.114	—
32	23	Bubba Wallace	23XI Racing	Toyota	1:13.136	—
33	21	Harrison Burton (P)	Wood Brothers Racing	Ford	1:13.154	—
34	50	Juan Pablo Montoya	23XI Racing	Toyota	1:13.204	—
35	42	John Hunter Nemechek	Legacy Motor Club	Toyota	1:13.366	—
36	51	Justin Haley	Rick Ware Racing	Ford	1:13.468	—
37	38	Todd Gilliland	Front Row Motorsports	Ford	1:13.460	—
38	15	Kaz Grala (R)	Rick Ware Racing	Ford	1:13.825	—
Official qualifying results

== Race ==
=== Race results ===
==== Stage results ====
Stage One Laps: 20

Pos	No	Driver	Team	Manufacturer	Points
1	19	Martin Truex Jr. (P)	Joe Gibbs Racing	Toyota	10
2	48	Alex Bowman (P)	Hendrick Motorsports	Chevrolet	9
3	14	Chase Briscoe (P)	Stewart-Haas Racing	Ford	8
4	99	Daniel Suárez (P)	Trackhouse Racing	Chevrolet	7
5	2	Austin Cindric (P)	Team Penske	Ford	6
6	9	Chase Elliott (P)	Hendrick Motorsports	Chevrolet	5
7	45	Tyler Reddick (P)	23XI Racing	Toyota	4
8	5	Kyle Larson (P)	Hendrick Motorsports	Chevrolet	3
9	43	Erik Jones	Legacy Motor Club	Toyota	2
10	31	Daniel Hemric	Kaulig Racing	Chevrolet	1
Official stage one results

Stage Two Laps: 20

Pos	No	Driver	Team	Manufacturer	Points
1	1	Ross Chastain	Trackhouse Racing	Chevrolet	10
2	16	Shane van Gisbergen (i)	Kaulig Racing	Chevrolet	0
3	22	Joey Logano (P)	Team Penske	Ford	8
4	54	Ty Gibbs (P)	Joe Gibbs Racing	Toyota	7
5	24	William Byron (P)	Hendrick Motorsports	Chevrolet	6
6	21	Harrison Burton (P)	Wood Brothers Racing	Ford	5
7	14	Chase Briscoe (P)	Stewart-Haas Racing	Ford	4
8	48	Alex Bowman (P)	Hendrick Motorsports	Chevrolet	3
9	41	Ryan Preece	Stewart-Haas Racing	Ford	2
10	11	Denny Hamlin (P)	Joe Gibbs Racing	Toyota	1
Official stage two results

=== Final Stage results ===
Stage Three Laps: 50

Pos	Grid	No	Driver	Team	Manufacturer	Laps	Points
1	24	17	Chris Buescher	RFK Racing	Ford	92	40
2	3	16	Shane van Gisbergen (i)	Kaulig Racing	Chevrolet	92	0
3	29	77	Carson Hocevar (R)	Spire Motorsports	Chevrolet	92	34
4	1	1	Ross Chastain	Trackhouse Racing	Chevrolet	92	43
5	19	71	Zane Smith (R)	Spire Motorsports	Chevrolet	92	32
6	12	14	Chase Briscoe (P)	Stewart-Haas Racing	Ford	92	43
7	10	34	Michael McDowell	Front Row Motorsports	Ford	92	30
8	18	7	Corey LaJoie	Spire Motorsports	Chevrolet	92	29
9	21	41	Ryan Preece	Stewart-Haas Racing	Ford	92	30
10	5	2	Austin Cindric (P)	Team Penske	Ford	92	33
11	9	10	Noah Gragson	Stewart-Haas Racing	Ford	92	26
12	20	5	Kyle Larson (P)	Hendrick Motorsports	Chevrolet	92	28
13	8	99	Daniel Suárez (P)	Trackhouse Racing	Chevrolet	92	31
14	17	20	Christopher Bell (P)	Joe Gibbs Racing	Toyota	92	23
15	7	22	Joey Logano (P)	Team Penske	Ford	92	30
16	37	38	Todd Gilliland	Front Row Motorsports	Ford	92	21
17	32	23	Bubba Wallace	23XI Racing	Toyota	92	20
18	4	48	Alex Bowman (P)	Hendrick Motorsports	Chevrolet	92	31
19	14	9	Chase Elliott (P)	Hendrick Motorsports	Chevrolet	92	23
20	2	19	Martin Truex Jr. (P)	Joe Gibbs Racing	Toyota	92	27
21	35	42	John Hunter Nemechek	Legacy Motor Club	Toyota	92	16
22	15	54	Ty Gibbs (P)	Joe Gibbs Racing	Toyota	92	22
23	22	11	Denny Hamlin (P)	Joe Gibbs Racing	Toyota	92	15
24	33	21	Harrison Burton (P)	Wood Brothers Racing	Ford	92	18
25	31	4	Josh Berry (R)	Stewart-Haas Racing	Ford	92	12
26	28	6	Brad Keselowski (P)	RFK Racing	Ford	92	11
27	16	45	Tyler Reddick (P)	23XI Racing	Toyota	92	14
28	23	3	Austin Dillon	Richard Childress Racing	Chevrolet	92	9
29	36	51	Justin Haley	Rick Ware Racing	Ford	92	8
30	13	8	Kyle Busch	Richard Childress Racing	Chevrolet	92	7
31	27	31	Daniel Hemric	Kaulig Racing	Chevrolet	92	7
32	34	50	Juan Pablo Montoya	23XI Racing	Toyota	91	5
33	25	43	Erik Jones	Legacy Motor Club	Toyota	90	6
34	11	24	William Byron (P)	Hendrick Motorsports	Chevrolet	90	9
35	38	15	Kaz Grala (R)	Rick Ware Racing	Ford	87	2
36	6	13	A. J. Allmendinger (i)	Kaulig Racing	Chevrolet	6	0
37	26	47	Ricky Stenhouse Jr.	JTG Daugherty Racing	Chevrolet	2	1
38	30	12	Ryan Blaney (P)	Team Penske	Ford	0	1
Official race results

=== Race statistics ===
- Lead changes: 11 among 9 different drivers
- Cautions/Laps: 7 for 21 laps
- Red flags: 0
- Time of race: 2 hours, 38 minutes, and 41 seconds
- Average speed: 80.226 miles per hour (129.111 km/h)

== Media ==
=== Television ===
USA covered the race on the television side as part of a Radio style Broadcast for the race. Leigh Diffey and Steve Letarte called the race from the broadcast booth. MRN broadcaster Mike Bagley called the race from the Esses, Dillon Welch called from Turn 5, and Jeff Burton called the race from Turn 6 & 7. Kim Coon, Parker Kligerman and Marty Snider handled the pit road duties from pit lane.

USA
Booth announcers	Turn Announcers	Pit reporters
Lap-by-lap: Leigh Diffey; Color-commentator: Steve Letarte	Esses Announcer: Mike Bagley; Turn 5 Announcer: Dillon Welch; Turn 6–7 Announcer: Jeff Burton	Kim Coon; Parker Kligerman; Marty Snider

=== Radio ===
Motor Racing Network radio called for the race, which was also simulcasted on Sirius XM NASCAR Radio. Alex Hayden, Jeff Striegle, and former crew chief Todd Gordon covered the action when the field raced down the front straightaway. Dave Moody called the race when the field raced thru the esses. Kyle Rickey covered the action when the field raced thru the inner loop and turn 5 and Jason Toy covered the action in turn 6 & 7. Steve Post, Brienne Pedigo, Chris Wilner & Jacklyn Drake called the action from the pits for MRN.

MRN
Booth announcers	Turn announcers	Pit reporters
Lead announcer: Alex Hayden; Announcer: Jeff Striegle; Announcer: Todd Gordon	Esses: Dave Moody; Inner loop & Turn 5: Kyle Rickey; Turn 6 & 7: Jason Toy	Steve Post; Brienne Pedigo; Chris Wilner; Jacklyn Drake

== Standings after the race ==
Drivers' Championship standings

	Pos	Driver	Points
1	1	Christopher Bell	2,089
5	2	Austin Cindric	2,086 (–3)
2	3	Joey Logano	2,084 (–5)
2	4	Alex Bowman	2,084 (–5)
4	5	Daniel Suárez	2,079 (–10)
3	6	Tyler Reddick	2,073 (–16)
1	7	Chase Elliott	2,073 (–16)
7	8	Ryan Blaney	2,072 (–17)
1	9	Kyle Larson	2,069 (–20)
6	10	William Byron	2,068 (–21)
5	11	Chase Briscoe	2,049 (–40)
	12	Ty Gibbs	2,049 (–40)
2	13	Denny Hamlin	2,043 (–46)
1	14	Brad Keselowski	2,037 (–52)
	15	Martin Truex Jr.	2,035 (–54)
2	16	Harrison Burton	2,029 (–60)
Official driver's standings

Manufacturers' Championship standings

	Pos	Manufacturer	Points
	1	Chevrolet	1,014
1	2	Ford	988 (–26)
1	3	Toyota	985 (–29)

- Note: Only the first 16 positions are included for the driver standings.

Previous race: 2024 Quaker State 400	NASCAR Cup Series; 2024 season	Next race: 2024 Bass Pro Shops Night Race
