= 2011 Bucyrus 200 =

Race details
- Map of Speedway
- Date: June 25, 2011
- Official name: 2011 Bucyrus 200 Presented by Menards
- Location: Road America in Elkhart Lake, Wisconsin
- Course: Road Course
- Course length: 4.048 miles (6.515 km)
- Distance: 57 laps, 231 mi (371.758 km)
- Scheduled distance: 50 laps, 202 mi (325.807 km)
- Weather: Sunnt
- Average speed: 78.929 mph (127.024 km/h)
- Attendance: 50,000

Pole position
Driver	Michael McDowell	Joe Gibbs Racing
- Time: 2:13.230

Most laps led
Driver	Michael McDowell	Joe Gibbs Racing
- Laps: 30

Winner
No. 32	Reed Sorenson	Turner Motorsports

Television in the United States
- Network: ESPN
- Announcers: Allen Bestwick, Rusty Wallace, Andy Petree

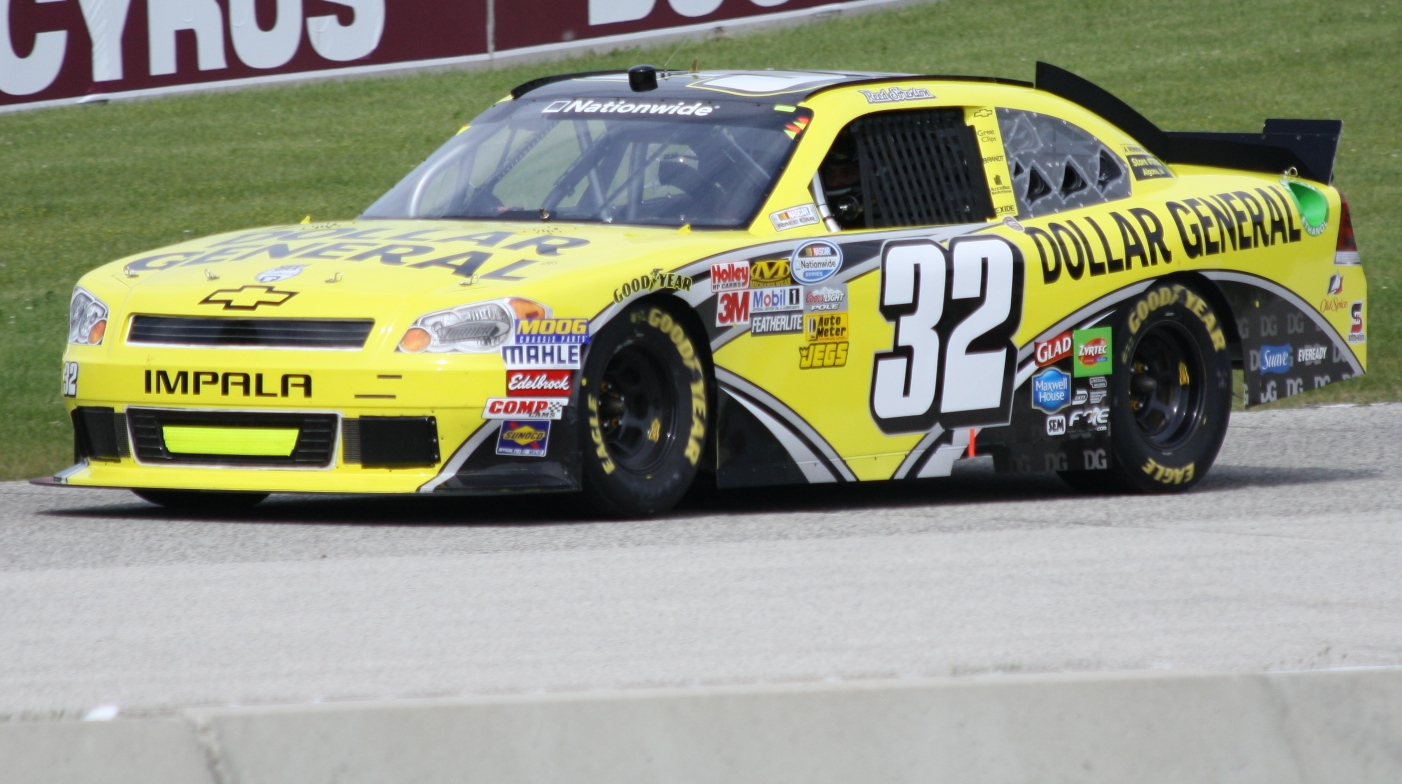
Nationwide 32 Reed Sorenson 2011 Road America Bucyrus 200

The 2011 Bucyrus 200 presented by Menards was a NASCAR Nationwide Series race held on June 25, 2011, at Road America in Elkhart Lake, Wisconsin. The race was the 16th of the 2011 NASCAR Nationwide Series and the 2nd iteration of the event. Michael McDowell won the pole for the race and led the most laps but the race featured a crazy and controversial finish as Reed Sorenson won the race in the end as the race became a wreckfest towards the end.

== Background ==
Road America is a motorsport road course located near Elkhart Lake, Wisconsin, United States on Wisconsin Highway 67. It has hosted races since the 1950s and currently hosts races in the NASCAR Cup and Xfinity Series, WeatherTech SportsCar Championship, IndyCar Series, SCCA Pirelli World Challenge, ASRA, AMA Superbike series, and SCCA Pro Racing's Trans-Am Series.

=== Entry list ===
- (R) denotes rookie driver
- (i) denotes driver who is ineligible for series driver points

#	Driver	Team	Make
01	Mike Wallace	JD Motorsports	Chevrolet
2	Elliott Sadler	Kevin Harvick Inc.	Chevrolet
03	Scott Wimmer (i)	R3 Motorsports	Dodge
6	Ricky Stenhouse Jr.	Roush Fenway Racing	Ford
7	Ron Fellows	JR Motorsports	Chevrolet
09	Kenny Wallace	RAB Racing	Toyota
11	Brian Scott	Joe Gibbs Racing	Toyota
13	Jennifer Jo Cobb (R)	JJC Racing	Ford
14	Eric McClure	TriStar Motorsports	Chevrolet
15	Timmy Hill (R)	Rick Ware Racing	Ford
16	Trevor Bayne	Roush Fenway Racing	Ford
18	Michael McDowell (i)	Joe Gibbs Racing	Toyota
19	Mike Bliss	TriStar Motorsports	Chevrolet
22	Jacques Villeneuve	Penske Racing	Dodge
23	Alex Kennedy	R3 Motorsports	Dodge
28	Derrike Cope	Jay Robinson Racing	Chevrolet
30	Ricky Carmichael (i)	Turner Motorsports	Chevrolet
31	Justin Allgaier	Turner Motorsports	Chevrolet
32	Reed Sorenson	Turner Motorsports	Chevrolet
33	Max Papis	Kevin Harvick Inc.	Chevrolet
38	Jason Leffler	Turner Motorsports	Chevrolet
39	Josh Wise	Go Green Racing	Ford
40	Charles Lewandoski (R)	Key Motorsports	Chevrolet
41	Doug Harrington	Rick Ware Racing	Ford
42	Tim Andrews	Key Motorsports	Chevrolet
44	Jeff Green	TriStar Motorsports	Chevrolet
46	Chase Miller	Key Motorsports	Chevrolet
51	Jeremy Clements	Jeremy Clements Racing	Chevrolet
52	Tim Schendel	Means Motorsports	Chevrolet
53	Andrew Ranger	NDS Motorsports	Dodge
55	Brett Rowe	Faith Motorsports	Chevrolet
60	Billy Johnson	Roush Fenway Racing	Ford
62	Michael Annett	Rusty Wallace Racing	Toyota
64	Jason Bowles	Rusty Wallace Racing	Toyota
66	Steve Wallace	Rusty Wallace Racing	Toyota
67	J. R. Fitzpatrick	Go Canada Racing	Ford
70	Dennis Setzer	ML Motorsports	Dodge
75	Carl Long	Rick Ware Racing	Ford
81	Blake Koch (R)	MacDonald Motorsports	Dodge
87	Kevin Conway	NEMCO Motorsports	Toyota
88	Aric Almirola	JR Motorsports	Chevrolet
89	Morgan Shepherd	Faith Motorsports	Chevrolet
Official Entry List

== Qualifying ==
Michael McDowell won the pole for the race, his first of his career, with a time of 2:13.230 and a speed of 109.381.

Grid	No.	Driver	Team	Manufacturer	Time	Speed
1	18	Michael McDowell (i)	Joe Gibbs Racing	Toyota	2:13.230	109.381
2	33	Max Papis	Kevin Harvick Inc.	Chevrolet	2:14.163	108.620
3	22	Jacques Villeneuve	Penske Racing	Dodge	2:14.336	108.480
4	60	Billy Johnson	Roush Fenway Racing	Ford	2:14.406	108.424
5	7	Ron Fellows	JR Motorsports	Chevrolet	2:14.967	107.973
6	66	Steve Wallace	Rusty Wallace Racing	Toyota	2:15.000	107.947
7	2	Elliott Sadler	Kevin Harvick Inc.	Chevrolet	2:15.213	107.777
8	6	Ricky Stenhouse Jr.	Roush Fenway Racing	Ford	2:15.624	107.450
9	38	Jason Leffler	Turner Motorsports	Chevrolet	2:15.651	107.429
10	64	Jason Bowles	Rusty Wallace Racing	Toyota	2:15.710	107.382
11	16	Trevor Bayne	Roush Fenway Racing	Ford	2:15.712	107.380
12	32	Reed Sorenson	Turner Motorsports	Chevrolet	2:16.288	106.927
13	11	Brian Scott*	Joe Gibbs Racing	Toyota	2:16.305	106.913
14	31	Justin Allgaier	Turner Motorsports	Chevrolet	2:16.365	106.866
15	30	Ricky Carmichael (i)	Turner Motorsports	Chevrolet	2:16.389	106.847
16	09	Kenny Wallace	RAB Racing	Toyota	2:16.673	106.625
17	67	J. R. Fitzpatrick	Go Canada Racing	Ford	2:16.924	106.430
18	39	Josh Wise	Go Green Racing	Ford	2:17.202	106.214
19	23	Alex Kennedy*	R3 Motorsports	Dodge	2:17.302	106.137
20	88	Aric Almirola	JR Motorsports	Chevrolet	2:17.661	105.860
21	53	Andrew Ranger	NDS Motorsports	Dodge	2:17.804	105.750
22	62	Michael Annett	Rusty Wallace Racing	Toyota	2:18.224	105.429
23	15	Timmy Hill (R)	Rick Ware Racing	Ford	2:18.453	105.254
24	81	Blake Koch (R)	MacDonald Motorsports	Dodge	2:18.506	105.214
25	01	Mike Wallace	JD Motorsports	Chevrolet	2:18.849	104.954
26	19	Mike Bliss	TriStar Motorsports	Chevrolet	2:19.198	104.691
27	51	Jeremy Clements	Jeremy Clements Racing	Chevrolet	2:19.648	104.354
28	87	Kevin Conway	NEMCO Motorsports	Toyota	2:20.742	103.543
29	14	Eric McClure	TriStar Motorsports	Chevrolet	2:20.812	103.491
30	41	Doug Harrington	Rick Ware Racing	Ford	2:22.358	102.367
31	44	Jeff Green	TriStar Motorsports	Chevrolet	2:23.994	101.204
32	28	Derrike Cope*	Jay Robinson Racing	Chevrolet	2:25.590	100.095
33	75	Carl Long	Rick Ware Racing	Ford	2:25.797	99.953
34	46	Chase Miller	Key Motorsports	Chevrolet	2:26.595	99.409
35	89	Morgan Shepherd	Faith Motorsports	Chevrolet	2:27.068	99.089
36	03	Scott Wimmer (i)	R3 Motorsports	Dodge	2:30.441	96.867
37	55	Brett Rowe	Faith Motorsports	Chevrolet	2:30.671	96.719
38	42	Tim Andrews	Key Motorsprots	Chevrolet	2:31.301	96.317
39	70	Dennis Setzer	ML Motorsports	Dodge	2:33.589	94.882
40	40	Charles Lewandoski (R)	Key Motorsports	Chevrolet	2:34.089	94.574
41	52	Tim Schendel	Means Motorsports	Chevrolet	2:34.878	94.092
42	13	Jennifer Jo Cobb (R)*	JJC Racing	Ford	2:36.836	92.917
Official Starting Grid

* – Brian Scott, Jennifer Jo Cobb, Alex Kennedy, and Derrike Cope had to go to the rear of the field due to adjustments after impound.

== Race ==
Pole sitter Michael McDowell led the first lap of the race. The first incident of the day did not take long as it happened on lap 2 when Ricky Stenhouse Jr. made contact with Reed Sorenson and both spun in turn 3. It happened right in front of J. R. Fitzpatrick who went through the grass to avoid Stenhouse and Sorenson. No caution flew as they got their cars back going again. The first caution flew on lap 7 when Doug Harrington spun in turn 12 and got stuck in the gravel traps. Michael McDowell won the race off of pit road but Steve Wallace, Elliott Sadler, Jason Bowles, Michael Annett, and Timmy Hill did not pit although Hill went to pit before the green flag and Wallace led the field to the restart on lap 10. On lap 11, Jacques Villeneuve took the lead from Wallace. On lap 13, Jason Bowles' car got loose in turn 11 and slid up the track into the wall and taking out one of the Bucyrus signs. On lap 14, Trevor Bayne's car spun in turn 1 but no caution was thrown as Bayne got rolling again. On lap 15, Michael McDowell took the lead from Villeneuve. On lap 17, Billy Johnson spun in turn 5 and no caution flew as he got his car rolling. On that same lap, McDowell came into pit handing the lead to a veteran road course ringer in Ron Fellows. On lap 20, Doug Harrington spun out of turn 6 but did not bring out a caution as he got rolling again. The second caution flew when Kevin Conway spun in turn 1 on lap 21 and got stuck in the gravel trap. Some drivers went in to pit like Fellows while others stayed out because they pitted under green like McDowell and McDowell led the field to the restart on lap 25. On the restart, Jacques Villeneuve took the lead from McDowell in turn 5. Unfortunately for Villeneuve, he would be penalized for changing lanes before they reached the start finish line on the restart handing the lead to Michael McDowell once again.

=== Final laps ===
With 24 laps to go, the third caution flew when Jeremy Clements' car stalled up the hill entering turn 6 after his engine let go. The race would restart with 21 laps to go. McDowell had a challenge for the lead in Elliott Sadler but Sadler could not get past McDowell. Soon green flag pitstops began with 17 to go. With 16 to go, McDowell pitted and gave the lead to Ron Fellows. Fellows pitted with 15 to go and handed the lead to Jacques Villeneuve. Villeneuve pitted with 14 to go giving the lead to Mike Wallace. Wallace soon pitted with 12 to go and handed the lead to Brian Scott who would lead the next 5 laps before Michael McDowell took the lead from him with 7 laps to go. McDowell was looking for his first ever win in all of NASCAR 3 years after his violent qualifying crash at Texas as he began to pull away from Scott with the 3rd place car in Ron Fellows being over 7 seconds back. Unfortunately for McDowell and some others, the fourth caution would fly with just 4 laps to go when Doug Harrington crashed in turn 11. The caution would turn things upside down as the race became a fuel strategy race to see who had enough to make it around 8 miles and take home the checkered flag and it would also set up three attempts of a green-white-checkered finish. McDowell took the lead from Fellows on the restart. But for some reason, Jacques Villeneuve thought it was a good idea to go to Brian Scott's right side before the pit road exit lane ended and Villeneuve clipped the grass and ended up sliding up the track and wrecking both Scott and Max Papis in the process in turn 1 bringing out the 5th caution of the race. The caution would set up a 2nd attempt of a green-white-checkered. McDowell took the lead from Fellows on the restart. But in turn 3, Justin Allgaier charged his way and challenged McDowell for the lead. McDowell got in front of Allgaier in turn 5 but McDowell pushed up the track in the turn and Allgaier sneaked under McDowell and took the lead. McDowell tried to catch Allgaier but slid up again in turn 6 and ended up spinning out in the grass ending his chances of winning. While he was spinning, Eric McClure, Alex Kennedy, and Steve Wallace all spun out in the same turn with McClure and Wallace crashing out while Kennedy got stuck in the gravel trap. This would bring out the 6th caution of the race and set up a final attempt of a green-white-checkered. Cars frantically started saving fuel as the race would restart for the last time. On the restart, Allgaier took the lead from Fellows and began to pull away. Soon, cars started spinning everywhere. Aric Almirola spun in turn 5 while Brian Scott spun in turn 6 on the same lap. Almirola got stuck in the gravel trap and could not get back going again. Allgaier took the white flag before the 7th and final caution flew for Almirola's car stalling in turn 5 when Allgaier was in turn 3. Allgaier had to make it around 11 more corners and cross the finish line first to take the win which would be his third career Nationwide Series win and the second of the season. But coming up the hill to turn 6, Allgaier's car ran out of gas and as a result of NASCAR's rule, if you don't maintain pace car speed you lose your position. Ron Fellows passed Allgaier and Fellows was the new race leader. Allgaier's teammate Jason Leffler, who was in 5th, also ran out of gas. Ron Fellows took the checkered flag in first place as he was looking for his 7th career NASCAR victory and his first since the 2008 NAPA Auto Parts 200 at Montreal.

=== Post race ===
While Fellows was taking the checkered flag, Reed Sorenson pulled up alongside Fellows as if to argue he won. But when replays were shown, Fellows was in third when the caution came out and Fellows did not slow down and passed by Sorenson under caution while still on the gas before he slowed down when he was right behind Allgaier. After Allgaier ran out of gas and Fellows passed him, Fellows continued to speed up and not go pace car speed until he caught up to the pace car out of turn 10. After looking at the replays, NASCAR determined that Ron Fellows passed Reed Sorenson under caution which is illegal and Reed Sorenson is the race winner with Fellows finishing in 2nd. This would be Sorenson's first win of 2011, his 4th and final career Nationwide Series win, and his first win since the 2007 Gateway 250. Jacques Villeneuve, Elliott Sadler, and Mike Wallace rounded out the top 5 while Andrew Ranger, Michael Annett, Ricky Stenhouse Jr., Ricky Carmichael, and J. R. Fitzpatrick rounded out the top 10. All four Canadian drivers in Fellows, Villeneuve, Ranger, and Fitzpatrick all finished in the top 10.

After the race, tempers flared against Jacques Villeneuve. Brian Scott and Max Papis, who Villeneuve both wrecked, took turns expressing their frustrations at Villeneuve. Scott ran into the rear of Villeneuve on the pit road and then Papis pulled up alongside Villeneuve's car to talk about what happened. The conversation between Villeneuve and Papis was not caught on camera.

== Race results ==
Pos	Car	Driver	Team	Manufacturer	Laps Run	Laps Led	Status	Points
1	32	Reed Sorenson	Turner Motorsports	Chevrolet	57	1	running	47
2	7	Ron Fellows	JR Motorsports	Chevrolet	57	6	running	43
3	22	Jacques Villeneuve	Penske Racing	Dodge	57	5	running	42
4	2	Elliott Sadler	Kevin Harvick Inc.	Chevrolet	57	0	running	40
5	01	Mike Wallace	JD Motorsports	Chevrolet	57	2	running	40
6	53	Andrew Ranger	NDS Motorsports	Dodge	57	0	running	38
7	62	Michael Annett	Rusty Wallace Racing	Toyota	57	0	running	37
8	6	Ricky Stenhouse Jr.	Roush Fenway Racing	Ford	57	0	running	36
9	30	Ricky Carmichael (i)	Turner Motorsports	Chevrolet	57	0	running	0
10	67	J. R. Fitzpatrick	Go Canada Racing	Ford	57	0	running	34
11	15	Timmy Hill (R)	Rick Ware Racing	Ford	57	0	running	33
12	18	Michael McDowell (i)	Joe Gibbs Racing	Toyota	57	30	running	0
13	39	Josh Wise	Go Green Racing	Ford	57	0	running	31
14	81	Blake Koch (R)	MacDonald Motorsports	Dodge	57	0	running	30
15	19	Mike Bliss	TriStar Motorsports	Chevrolet	57	0	running	29
16	11	Brian Scott	Joe Gibbs Racing	Toyota	57	4	running	29
17	28	Derrike Cope	Jay Robinson Racing	Chevrolet	57	0	running	27
18	70	Dennis Setzer	ML Motorsports	Dodge	57	0	running	26
19	31	Justin Allgaier	Turner Motorsports	Chevrolet	56	4	out of fuel	26
20	38	Jason Leffler	Turner Motorsports	Chevrolet	56	0	out of fuel	24
21	23	Alex Kennedy	R3 Motorsports	Dodge	56	0	running	23
22	88	Aric Almirola	JR Motorsports	Chevrolet	56	0	running	22
23	33	Max Papis	Kevin Harvick Inc.	Chevrolet	55	0	running	21
24	87	Kevin Conway	NEMCO Motorsports	Toyota	54	0	running	20
25	52	Tim Schendel	Means Motorsports	Chevrolet	54	0	running	19
26	66	Steve Wallace	Rusty Wallace Racing	Toyota	52	4	crash	19
27	14	Eric McClure	TriStar Motorsports	Toyota	52	0	crash	17
28	09	Kenny Wallace	RAB Racing	Toyota	49	0	running	16
29	13	Jennifer Jo Cobb (R)	JJC Racing	Ford	49	0	running	15
30	41	Doug Harrington	Rick Ware Racing	Ford	45	0	crash	14
31	16	Trevor Bayne	Roush Fenway Racing	Ford	36	0	overheating	13
32	51	Jeremy Clements	Jeremy Clements Racing	Chevrolet	26	0	engine	12
33	60	Billy Johnson	Roush Fenway Racing	Ford	25	0	engine	11
34	64	Jason Bowles	Rusty Wallace Racing	Toyota	16	0	crash	10
35	89	Morgan Shepherd	Faith Motorsports	Chevrolet	11	0	handling	9
36	75	Carl Long	Rick Ware Racing	Ford	6	0	carburetor	8
37	40	Charles Lewandowski (R)	Key Motorsports	Chevrolet	4	0	ignition	7
38	44	Jeff Green	TriStar Motorsports	Chevrolet	3	0	vibration	6
39	03	Scott Wimmer (i)	R3 Motorsports	Dodge	3	0	brakes	0
40	46	Chase Miller	Key Motorsports	Chevrolet	2	0	brakes	4
41	42	Tim Andrews	Key Motorsports	Chevrolet	2	0	brakes	3
42	55	Brett Rowe	Faith Motorsports	Chevrolet	2	0	brakes	2
Official Race results

Previous race: 2011 Alliance Truck Parts 250	NASCAR Nationwide Series; 2011 season	Next race: 2011 Subway Jalapeño 250
