= NASCAR Xfinity Series at Road America =

NASCAR Xfinity Series race

Road America 180

NASCAR Xfinity Series
- Venue: Road America
- Location: Elkhart Lake, Wisconsin, United States
- First race: 2010
- Last race: 2023
- Distance: 182.16 miles (293.16 km)
- Laps: 45; Stage 1: 22; Stage 2: 12; Final stage: 11
- Previous names: Bucyrus 200 Presented by Menards (2010–2011); Sargento 200 (2012); Johnsonville Sausage 200 Presented by Menards (2013); Gardner Denver 200 Fired Up by Johnsonville (2014); Road America 180 Fired Up by Johnsonville (2015–2016); Johnsonville 180 (2017–2018); CTECH Manufacturing 180 (2019); Henry 180 (2020–2022)
- Most wins (team): Richard Childress Racing & Joe Gibbs Racing (3)
- Most wins (manufacturer): Chevrolet (8)

Circuit information
- Surface: Asphalt
- Length: 4.048 mi (6.515 km)
- Turns: 14

The Road America 180 was a NASCAR Xfinity Series race that was taken place at Road America from 2010 until 2023. The race was a standalone race for the series except for 2021 and 2022 when the NASCAR Cup Series had a race at the track on the same weekend.

== History ==
The track held its first Xfinity event in 2010 after the Milwaukee Mile's race was moved to the track. Road America had held a Grand National (now NASCAR Cup Series) race in the 1956 that was won by Tim Flock. Carl Edwards won the inaugural 50-lap race, named the Bucyrus 200, after holding off Canadian road course ringers, Jacques Villeneuve and Ron Fellows.

In 2011, the Bucyrus 200 was won by Reed Sorenson after a confusing series of events in which numerous drivers either crashed, were penalized, or ran out of gas. This was the first Xfinity Series race to require three green-white-checker finish attempts, extending the race to 57 laps. Michael McDowell was leading until he ran out of fuel on the first GWC-finish attempt, handing the lead to Justin Allgaier. A caution came out on the final lap which forced the race to end under yellow. Just after the yellow came out, Allgaier slowed down after running out of gas. When the dust settled, Ron Fellows appeared to have won the race, but, after a 10-minute delay, NASCAR determined that Fellows had made a pass on leader Reed Sorenson after a final-lap caution came out, handing the win to Sorenson and dropping Fellows to second.

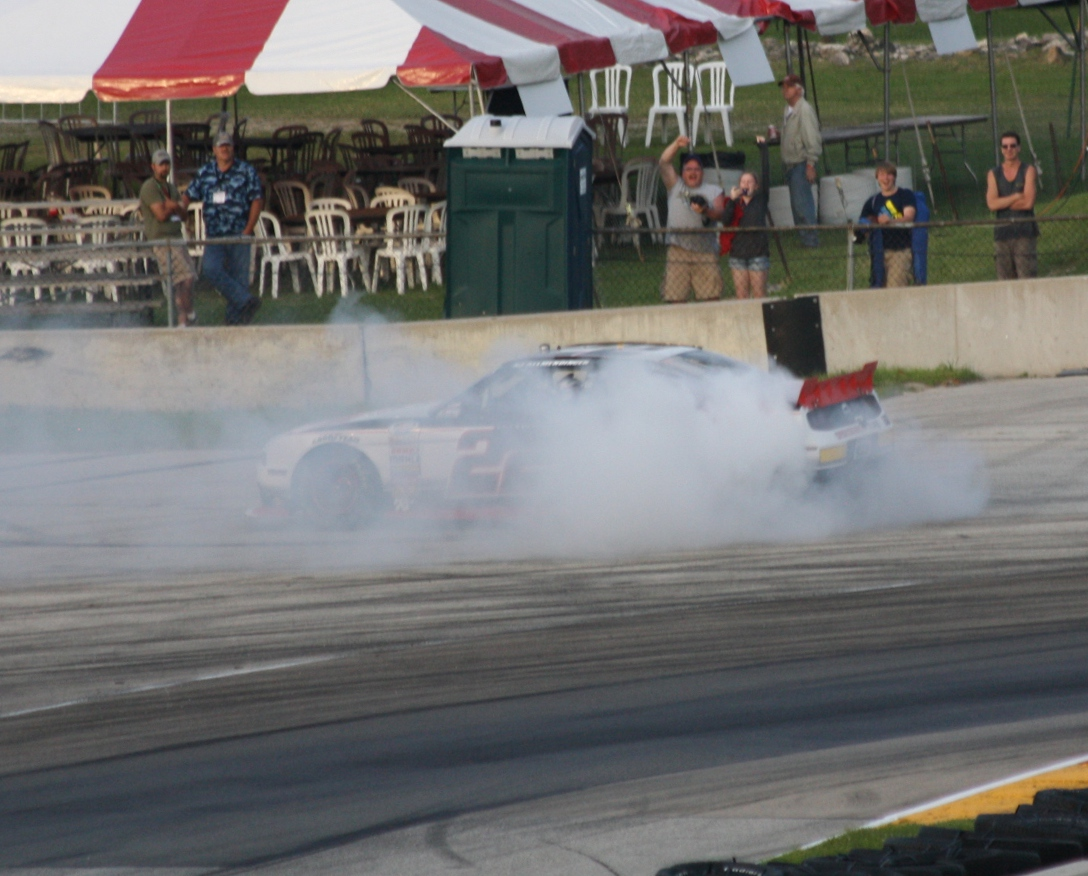
A. J. Allmendinger celebrates his win in the 2013 race

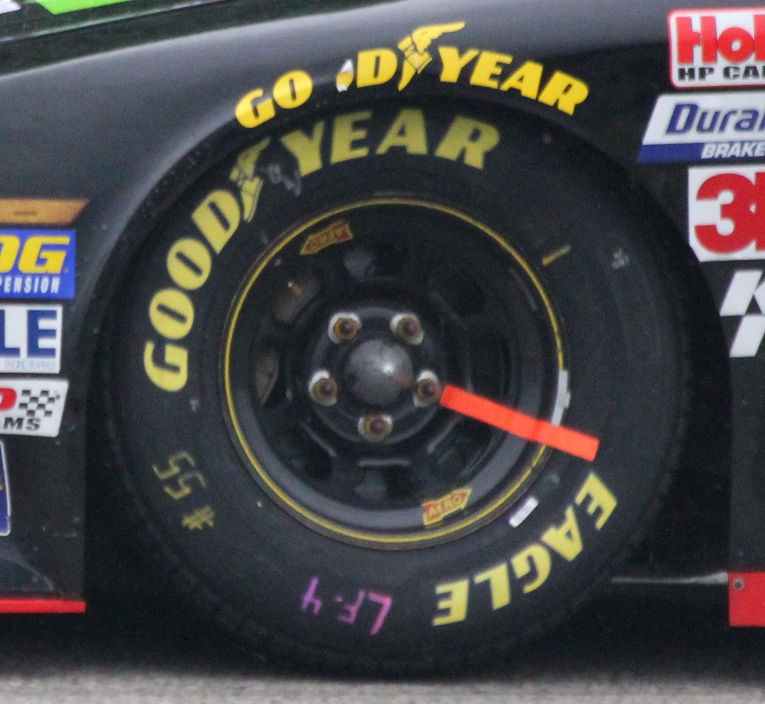
A rain tire used during the 2014 race

The next year, in the newly renamed Sargento 200, Brazilian Nelson Piquet Jr. won his first career race ahead of Michael McDowell and Ron Fellows. In 2013, the once again renamed Johnsonville Sausage 200 pole winner was A. J. Allmendinger. Allmendinger, Owen Kelly, and Billy Johnson all took turns leading, with Allmendinger leading the most at 29. Allmendinger would go on to win the race after eight caution flags waved and the race was extended to 55 laps due to two green-white-checker finish attempts. The race became memorable when road course ringer, Max Papis got furious with Billy Johnson for spinning him out twice; on pit road Papis slapped Johnson and walked off grinning.

The race was renamed as the Gardner Denver 200 for 2014. That year, the race suffered rain, delaying the start by one hour. Despite this, NASCAR had the cars put on rain tires and race in the rain for the first time since 2009 in Montreal's NNS event. Sam Hornish Jr. led over 25 laps and dominated. However Alex Tagliani controlled the second half of the race after starting on pole position. When he was about to take the white flag, a yellow flag period began. Just after the caution came out, Tagliani ran out of gas and stalled at the start/finish line. Brendan Gaughan prevailed after holding off a charge from deep in the pack by Tagliani for his first NNS win, while Kevin O'Connell was awarded the "Driver of the Race" award, for almost snatching the win from Gaughan on the final lap, driving for Rick Ware Racing.

In 2015, the race was moved from June to the last weekend of August and it takes place during an off-weekend for the NASCAR Cup Series, the race was reduced from 202.4 miles to 182.16 miles for 2015. Paul Menard took advantage of Blake Koch's ignition troubles to hold off Ryan Blaney for an emotional victory near his hometown in Wisconsin. In 2016, road ringer Alex Tagliani won the pole while Michael McDowell led the final 24 laps en route to his first NASCAR win.

On March 1, 2017, it was announced that Johnsonville Foods would again take over naming rights, naming the 2017 event the Johnsonville 180.

On August 27, 2017, Truck Series regular Austin Cindric led the field to green after qualifying was cancelled. IndyCar driver James Davison won Stage One, while rookie Daniel Hemric won Stage Two. In the end, independent driver Jeremy Clements took the checkers for his first series win after surviving a late race crash with Matt Tifft. The following year, Xfinity Series regular Justin Allgaier took the victory in a redemption story from 2011.

CTECH Manufacturing sponsored the race for 1 year in 2019.

Henry Repeating Arms was the title sponsor of the race from 2020 to 2022, and when they were the title sponsor, the pole and race winners were awarded matching, custom Henry 180 Edition Big Boy Lever-Action Rifles. Henry did not return as the title sponsor of the race in 2023 and a replacement was not found, and as a result, the name of the race reverted back to the Road America 180.

== Past winners ==
Year	Date	No.	Driver	Team	Manufacturer	Race Distance		Race Time	Average Speed (mph)	Report	Ref
Year	Date	No.	Driver	Team	Manufacturer	Laps	Miles (km)	Race Time	Average Speed (mph)	Report	Ref
2010	June 19	60	Carl Edwards	Roush Fenway Racing	Ford	50	202.4 (325.731)	2:57:17	68.501	Report	
2011	June 25	32	Reed Sorenson	Turner Motorsports	Chevrolet	57*	230.736 (371.333)	2:55:24	78.929	Report	
2012	June 23	30	Nelson Piquet Jr.	Turner Motorsports	Chevrolet	50	202.4 (325.731)	2:22:35	85.171	Report	
2013	June 22	22	A. J. Allmendinger	Penske Racing	Ford	55*	222.64 (356.224)	2:58:50	74.697	Report	
2014	June 21	62	Brendan Gaughan	Richard Childress Racing	Chevrolet	53*	214.544 (345.275)	2:48:03	76.6	Report	
2015	August 29	33	Paul Menard	Richard Childress Racing	Chevrolet	45	182.16 (293.158)	2:20:21	77.874	Report	
2016	August 27	2	Michael McDowell	Richard Childress Racing	Chevrolet	48*	194.304 (312.702)	2:36:20	74.573	Report	
2017	August 27	51	Jeremy Clements	Jeremy Clements Racing	Chevrolet	45	182.16 (293.158)	2:12:53	82.25	Report	
2018	August 25	7	Justin Allgaier	JR Motorsports	Chevrolet	45	182.16 (293.158)	2:23:57	75.926	Report	
2019	August 24	20	Christopher Bell	Joe Gibbs Racing	Toyota	45	182.16 (293.158)	2:11:38	83.031	Report	
2020	August 8	22	Austin Cindric	Team Penske	Ford	45	182.16 (293.158)	2:56:37	61.83	Report	
2021	July 3	54	Kyle Busch	Joe Gibbs Racing	Toyota	45	182.16 (293.158)	2:25:47	74.972	Report	
2022	July 2	54	Ty Gibbs	Joe Gibbs Racing	Toyota	48*	194.304 (312.702)	2:36:14	74.621	Report	
2023	July 29	1	Sam Mayer	JR Motorsports	Chevrolet	49*	198.352 (319.216)	3:02:21	65.265	Report	

- 2011, 2013, 2014, 2016, 2022, and 2023: Races extended due to NASCAR overtime.

=== Multiple winners (teams) ===
# Wins	Team	Years won
3	Richard Childress Racing	2014–2016
3	Joe Gibbs Racing	2019, 2021, 2022
2	Turner Motorsports	2011, 2012
2	Team Penske	2013, 2020
2	JR Motorsports	2018, 2023

=== Manufacturer wins ===
# Wins	Make	Years won
8	(United States) Chevrolet	2011, 2012, 2014–2018, 2023
3	(United States) Ford	2010, 2013, 2020
3	(Japan) Toyota	2019, 2021, 2022
