= 2011 Subway Jalapeño 250 =

Race details
- Map of Speedway
- Date: July 1, 2011
- Official name: 2011 Subway Jalapeño 250
- Location: Daytona International Speedway in Daytona Beach, Florida
- Course: Tri-oval
- Course length: 2.5 miles (4.023 km)
- Distance: 100 laps, 250 mi (400 km)
- Weather: Clear
- Average speed: 136.426 mph (219.556 km/h)
- Attendance: 50,000

Pole position
Driver	Kevin Harvick	Kevin Harvick Inc.
- Time: 49.545

Most laps led
Driver	Elliott Sadler	Kevin Harvick Inc.
- Laps: 31

Winner
No. 20	Joey Logano	Joe Gibbs Racing

Television in the United States
- Network: ESPN
- Announcers: Marty Reid, Dale Jarrett, Andy Petree

The 2011 Subway Jalapeño 250 was a NASCAR Nationwide Series race held at Daytona International Speedway in Daytona Beach, Florida on July 1, 2011. The race was 10th iteration of the event as well as the 17th race of the 2011 NASCAR Nationwide Series. Kevin Harvick won the pole while Elliott Sadler led the most laps. But it was Joey Logano who made a last lap pass on Sadler to win the race after Logano started in 18th but had to go back and start 40th and got caught up in a spin on lap 26.

== Background ==
Daytona International Speedway is a race track in Daytona Beach, Florida, United States. Since opening in 1959, it has been the home of the Daytona 500, the most prestigious race in NASCAR as well as its season opening event. In addition to NASCAR, the track also hosts races for ARCA, AMA Superbike, IMSA, SCCA, and Motocross. The track features multiple layouts including the primary 2.500 mi (4.023 km) high-speed tri-oval, a 3.560 mi (5.729 km) sports car course, a 2.950 mi (4.748 km) motorcycle course, and a 1,320 ft (402.3 m) karting and motorcycle flat-track. The track's 180-acre (72.8 ha) infield includes the 29-acre (11.7 ha) Lake Lloyd, which has hosted powerboat racing. The speedway is operated by NASCAR pursuant to a lease with the City of Daytona Beach on the property that runs until 2054. Dale Earnhardt is Daytona International Speedway's all-time winningest driver, with a total of 34 career victories (12- Daytona 500 Qualifying Races) (7- NASCAR Xfinity Series Races) (6- Busch Clash Races) (6- IROC Races) (2- Pepsi 400 July Races) (1- The 1998 Daytona 500).

=== Entry list ===
- (R) denotes rookie driver
- (i) denotes driver who is ineligible for series driver points

#	Driver	Team	Make
01	Mike Wallace	JD Motorsports	Chevrolet
1	Jamie McMurray (i)	Phoenix Racing	Chevrolet
2	Elliott Sadler	Kevin Harvick Inc.	Chevrolet
4	Kevin Harvick (i)	Kevin Harvick Inc.	Chevrolet
6	Ricky Stenhouse Jr.	Roush Fenway Racing	Ford
07	Danny Efland	Danny Efland Racing	Chevrolet
7	Danica Patrick	JR Motorsports	Chevrolet
09	Kenny Wallace	RAB Racing	Toyota
9	Tony Stewart (i)	Kevin Harvick Inc.	Chevrolet
11	Brian Scott	Joe Gibbs Racing	Toyota
13	Jennifer Jo Cobb (R)	JJC Racing	Ford
14	Eric McClure	TriStar Motorsports	Chevrolet
15	Timmy Hill (R)	Rick Ware Racing	Ford
16	Trevor Bayne	Roush Fenway Racing	Ford
18	Kyle Busch (i)	Joe Gibbs Racing	Toyota
19	Mike Bliss	TriStar Motorsports	Chevrolet
20	Joey Logano (i)	Joe Gibbs Racing	Chevrolet
21	Tim George Jr.	Richard Childress Racing	Chevrolet
22	Brad Keselowski (i)	Penske Racing	Dodge
23	Robert Richardson Jr.	R3 Motorsports	Dodge
28	Derrike Cope	Jay Robinson Racing	Chevrolet
30	Ricky Carmichael (i)	Turner Motorsports	Chevrolet
31	Justin Allgaier	Turner Motorsports	Chevrolet
32	Reed Sorenson	Turner Motorsports	Chevrolet
33	Clint Bowyer (i)	Kevin Harvick Inc.	Chevrolet
38	Jason Leffler	Turner Motorsports	Chevrolet
39	Josh Wise	Go Green Racing	Ford
40	Charles Lewandoski (R)	Key Motorsports	Chevrolet
41	Jeffrey Earnhardt (i)	Rick Ware Racing	Chevrolet
42	Tim Andrews	Key Motorsports	Chevrolet
44	Jeff Green	TriStar Motorsports	Chevrolet
46	Chase Miller	Key Motorsports	Chevrolet
51	Jeremy Clements	Jeremy Clements Racing	Chevrolet
52	Kevin Lepage	Means Motorsports	Chevrolet
60	Carl Edwards (i)	Roush Fenway Racing	Ford
62	Michael Annett	Rusty Wallace Racing	Toyota
66	Steve Wallace	Rusty Wallace Racing	Toyota
68	Carl Long	Fleur-de-lis Motorsports	Chevrolet
70	Dennis Setzer	ML Motorsports	Dodge
74	Mike Harmon	Mike Harmon Racing	Chevrolet
81	Blake Koch (R)	MacDonald Motorsports	Dodge
87	Kevin Conway	NEMCO Motorsports	Toyota
88	Aric Almirola	JR Motorsports	Chevrolet
89	Morgan Shepherd	Faith Motorsports	Chevrolet
97	Joe Nemechek	NEMCO Motorsports	Toyota
Official Entry list

== Qualifying ==
Kevin Harvick won the pole for the race with a time of 49.545 and a speed of 181.653. Harvick's team Kevin Harvick Incorporated dominated the first two rows.

Grid	No.	Driver	Team	Manufacturer	Time	Speed
1	4	Kevin Harvick (i)	Kevin Harvick Inc.	Chevrolet	49.545	181.653
2	9	Tony Stewart (i)	Kevin Harvick Inc.	Chevrolet	49.621	181.375
3	2	Elliott Sadler	Kevin Harvick Inc.	Chevrolet	49.793	180.748
4	33	Clint Bowyer (i)	Kevin Harvick Inc.	Chevrolet	49.894	180.382
5	16	Trevor Bayne	Roush Fenway Racing	Ford	49.922	180.281
6	1	Jamie McMurray (i)	Phoenix Racing	Chevrolet	49.945	180.198
7	7	Danica Patrick	JR Motorsports	Chevrolet	49.970	180.108
8	60	Carl Edwards (i)	Roush Fenway Racing	Ford	49.999	180.004
9	32	Reed Sorenson	Turner Motorsports	Chevrolet	50.038	179.863
10	31	Justin Allgaier	Turner Motorsports	Chevrolet	50.074	179.734
11	22	Brad Keselowski (i)	Penske Racing	Dodge	50.106	179.619
12	6	Ricky Stenhouse Jr.	Roush Fenway Racing	Ford	50.134	179.519
13	88	Aric Almirola	JR Motorsports	Chevrolet	50.156	179.440
14	18	Kyle Busch (i)	Joe Gibbs Racing	Toyota	50.197	179.294
15	38	Jason Leffler	Turner Motorsports	Chevrolet	50.233	179.165
16	21	Tim George Jr.	Richard Childress Racing	Chevrolet	50.256	179.083
17	11	Brian Scott	Joe Gibbs Racing	Toyota	50.264	179.055
18	20	Joey Logano (i)**	Joe Gibbs Racing	Toyota	50.326	178.834
19	09	Kenny Wallace	RAB Racing	Toyota	50.422	178.494
20	66	Steve Wallace	Rusty Wallace Racing	Toyota	50.445	178.412
21	30	Ricky Carmichael (i)	Turner Motorsports	Chevrolet	50.492	178.246
22	01	Mike Wallace	JD Motorsports	Chevrolet	50.586	177.915
23	62	Michael Annett	Rusty Wallace Racing	Toyota	50.664	177.641
24	97	Joe Nemechek	NEMCO Motorsports	Toyota	50.746	177.354
25	87	Kevin Conway	NEMCO Motorsports	Toyota	50.894	176.838
26	15	Timmy Hill (R)	Rick Ware Racing	Ford	50.982	176.533
27	23	Robert Richardson Jr.	R3 Motorsports	Dodge	50.987	176.516
28	41	Jeffrey Earnhardt (i)	Rick Ware Racing	Chevrolet	51.020	176.401
29	44	Jeff Green	TriStar Motorsports	Chevrolet	51.028	176.374
30	74	Mike Harmon	Mike Harmon Racing	Chevrolet	51.047	176.308
31	81	Blake Koch (R)	MacDonald Motorsports	Dodge	51.083	176.184
32	68	Carl Long	Fleur-de-lis Motorsports	Chevrolet	51.098	176.132
33	19	Mike Bliss**	TriStar Motorsports	Chevrolet	51.134	176.008
34	13	Jennifer Jo Cobb (R)	JJC Racing	Ford	51.173	175.874
35	89	Morgan Shepherd	Faith Motorsports	Chevrolet	51.287	175.483
36	39	Josh Wise	Go Green Racing	Ford	51.301	175.435
37	51	Jeremy Clements	Jeremy Clements Racing	Chevrolet	51.397	175.107
38	14	Eric McClure**	TriStar Motorsports	Chevrolet	51.421	175.026
39	40	Charles Lewandoski (R)	Key Motorsports	Chevrolet	51.663	174.206
40	28	Derrike Cope	Jay Robinson Racing	Chevrolet	51.751	173.910
41	52	Kevin Lepage*	Means Motorsports	Chevrolet	51.973	173.167
42	70	Dennis Setzer*	ML Motorsports	Dodge	53.128	169.402
43	07	Danny Efland	Danny Efland Racing	Chevrolet	51.208	175.754
Failed to Qualify, withdrew, or driver changes
44	46	Chase Miller	Key Motorsports	Chevrolet	51.519	174.693
WD	42	Tim Andrews	Key Motorsports	Chevrolet	—	—
Official Starting grid

* – made the field via owners points.

** – Joey Logano, Mike Bliss, and Eric McClure had to start at the rear of the field all for adjustments outside impound.

== Race ==
Drivers began to form into tandems when the race started. Pole sitter Kevin Harvick led the first lap with Elliott Sadler behind him. On lap 3, Tony Stewart attempted to take the lead with Clint Bowyer behind him and led that lap before he and Bowyer got separated and gave the lead back to Harvick. Bowyer also pitted the same lap believing he had a flat tire. On lap 7, Brad Keselowski attempted to take the lead with Aric Almirola but couldn't pass Harvick. Keselowski tried again on lap 9 and this time was successful. On lap 10, Ricky Stenhouse Jr. took the lead with Trevor Bayne behind him. On lap 14, Brad Keselowski took the lead back from Stenhouse. On lap 16, Elliott Sadler took the lead. On lap 17, Keselowski took the lead back. On lap 20, Kevin Harvick took the lead. On lap 22, Aric Almirola took the lead. On lap 23, Kevin Harvick took the lead back. On lap 24, Danica Patrick took the lead with Tony Stewart behind her. On lap 26, the first caution flew when Joey Logano spun in turn 3 after he and his partner Brian Scott tried to go low to avoid a lapped car in Kevin Lepage but realizing they would go below the yellow line which would be a penalty but Logano got turned by Scott. Elliott Sadler won the race off of pit road and he led the field to the restart on lap 31. On lap 34, the second caution would fly when Ricky Carmichael spun in turn 2 after he cut a left rear tire while getting pushed by Timmy Hill and hit the outside wall. The wreck also collected Danny Efland who spun late to avoid Carmichael but got turned by Aric Almirola. The race would restart on lap 39. On lap 40, Danica Patrick took the lead with Tony Stewart pushing her. On lap 43, Reed Sorenson took the lead with Jason Leffler. On lap 44, Patrick took the lead back after Sorenson and Leffler switched positions. At the same time, the third caution would fly when Eric McClure got turned by his teammate Mike Bliss down the frontstretch into turn 1 and McClure went up and hit the outside wall hard and spun down through the infield.

=== Final laps ===
Jason Leffler won the race off of pit road but Carl Edwards, Jamie McMurray, Steve Wallace, Michael Annett, and Brad Keselowski did not pit and Edwards led the field to the restart on lap 49. But on the restart, a stack up ensued on the inside line and Jennifer Jo Cobb ran into the rear of Tim George Jr. hard enough to where it punctured the radiator of Cobb's car and brought out the 4th caution for oil. The race would restart with 47 laps to go on lap 54. With 43 laps to go, Danica Patrick took the lead with Aric Almirola behind her. With 40 laps to go, Carl Edwards retook the lead. With 36 to go, Kyle Busch took the lead. With 35 to go, Elliott Sadler took the lead. With 29 to go, Carl Edwards took the lead. With 28 to go, Clint Bowyer took the lead. With 27 to go, Tony Stewart took the lead. With 25 to go, Carl Edwards took the lead back. With 23 to go, Tony Stewart tried to take the lead from Edwards with Sadler and led that lap but could not get in front of Edwards. With 21 laps to go, the 5th caution flew when Clint Bowyer hit the outside backstretch wall hard after he got hooked by his teammate Kevin Harvick. Kevin Harvick won the race off of pit road and he led the field to the restart with 16 laps to go. On the restart, Harvick fell back after failing to get in front of his teammate Elliott Sadler and Sadler took the lead with Tony Stewart behind him. With 15 to go, Joey Logano attempted to take the lead with Kyle Busch but failed to do so after Busch made contact with Aric Almirola that caused them to fall back. With 13 laps to go, Ricky Stenhouse Jr. took the lead with Trevor Bayne. With 12 to go, Sadler took the lead back. With 11 laps to go, the 6th and final caution flew when Joe Nemechek got turned by Kevin Conway and both of the NEMCO cars slid up into the outside wall in turn 3. The race would restart for the last time with 7 laps to go. On the restart, Brad Keselowski took the lead with Kevin Harvick. With 6 laps to go, Elliott Sadler took the lead back. With 5 to go, Danica Patrick took the lead with Aric Almirola. Patrick was looking for her first Nationwide Series win. But with 4 to go, Sadler took the lead back. Soon, a pack of 10 cars formed up in tandems and tried to catch the Sadler–Stewart tandem. On the last lap, a tandem of Michael Annett and Steve Wallace passed Sadler and Annett and took the lead. In turn 1, the tandem of Danica Patrick and Aric Almirola went high to pass the Sadler–Stewart tandem and hit the outside wall but never lost momentum. Down the backstretch, a tandem of Joey Logano and Kyle Busch passed the Annett–Wallace tandem as both ended up getting separated. Logano and Busch would hold off everyone and Busch pushed Logano to the win. Behind them, a big wreck occurred through the tri-oval that took out 8 cars. It started when Mike Wallace, who was alone with no tandem, got loose off of turn 4 after almost making contact with Steve Wallace and Mike washed up high almost into Danica Patrick. Patrick got loose from Almirola and Patrick tried to come back down to re-hook with Almirola but Patrick got hooked by Almirola and Patrick turned down into Wallace. Mike Wallace got loose and came up into Patrick and both spun down and collected Steve Wallace, Elliott Sadler, and Tony Stewart and all 5 cars spun up into Aric Almirola and all 6 cars crashed into the outside wall. The wreck also caused Almirola's car to catch on fire. The wreck also collected Jamie McMurray and Brian Scott. The race would be Logano's first and only win of the 2011 Nationwide Series season. Jason Leffler, Reed Sorenson, Kyle Busch, and Justin Allgaier rounded out the top 5 while Michael Annett, Kenny Wallace, Elliott Sadler, Aric Almirola, and Danica Patrick rounded out the top 10.

== Race results ==
Pos	Car	Driver	Team	Manufacturer	Laps Run	Laps Led	Status	Points
1	20	Joey Logano (i)	Joe Gibbs Racing	Toyota	100	1	running	0
2	38	Jason Leffler	Turner Motorsports	Chevrolet	100	0	running	42
3	32	Reed Sorenson	Turner Motorsports	Chevrolet	100	1	running	42
4	18	Kyle Busch (i)	Joe Gibbs Racing	Toyota	100	1	running	0
5	31	Justin Allgaier	Turner Motorsports	Chevrolet	100	0	running	39
6	62	Michael Annett	Rusty Wallace Racing	Toyota	100	0	running	38
7	09	Kenny Wallace	RAB Racing	Toyota	100	0	running	37
8	2	Elliott Sadler	Kevin Harvick Inc.	Chevrolet	100	31	running	38
9	88	Aric Almirola	JR Motorsports	Chevrolet	100	1	running	36
10	7	Danica Patrick	JR Motorsports	Chevrolet	100	13	running	35
11	66	Steve Wallace	Rusty Wallace Racing	Toyota	100	0	running	33
12	11	Brian Scott	Joe Gibbs Racing	Toyota	100	0	running	32
13	9	Tony Stewart (i)	Kevin Harvick Inc.	Chevrolet	100	4	running	0
14	60	Carl Edwards (i)	Roush Fenway Racing	Ford	100	22	running	0
15	01	Mike Wallace	JD Motorsports	Chevrolet	100	0	running	29
16	1	Jamie McMurray (i)	Phoenix Racing	Chevrolet	100	0	running	0
17	22	Brad Keselowski (i)	Penske Racing	Dodge	100	7	running	0
18	4	Kevin Harvick (i)	Kevin Harvick Inc.	Chevrolet	100	13	running	0
19	41	Jeffrey Earnhardt (i)	Rick Ware Racing	Chevrolet	100	0	running	0
20	19	Mike Bliss	TriStar Motorsports	Chevrolet	100	0	running	24
21	21	Tim George Jr.	Richard Childress Racing	Chevrolet	100	0	running	24
22	16	Trevor Bayne	Roush Fenway Racing	Ford	100	0	running	22
23	15	Timmy Hill (R)	Rick Ware Racing	Ford	100	0	running	21
24	39	Josh Wise	Go Green Racing	Ford	100	0	running	20
25	87	Kevin Conway	NEMCO Motorsports	Toyota	100	0	running	19
26	97	Joe Nemechek	NEMCO Motorsprots	Toyota	100	0	running	18
27	6	Ricky Stenhouse Jr.	Roush Fenway Racing	Ford	100	5	running	18
28	81	Blake Koch (R)	MacDonald Motorsprots	Dodge	100	0	running	16
29	28	Derrike Cope	Jay Robinson Racing	Chevrolet	100	0	running	15
30	07	Danny Efland	Danny Efland Racing	Chevrolet	99	0	running	14
31	23	Robert Richardson Jr.	R3 Motorsports	Dodge	98	0	running	13
32	51	Jeremy Clements	Jeremy Clements Racing	Chevrolet	96	0	running	12
33	52	Kevin Lepage	Means Motorsports	Chevrolet	92	0	running	11
34	33	Clint Bowyer (i)	Kevin Harvick Inc.	Chevrolet	80	1	crash	0
35	70	Dennis Setzer	ML Motorsports	Dodge	69	0	vibration	9
36	13	Jennifer Jo Cobb (R)	JJC Racing	Ford	56	0	running	8
37	14	Eric McClure	TriStar Motorsports	Chevrolet	43	0	crash	7
38	89	Morgan Shepherd	Faith Motorsports	Chevrolet	41	0	engine	6
39	30	Ricky Carmichael (i)	Turner Motorsports	Chevrolet	34	0	crash	0
40	40	Charles Lewandoski (R)	Key Motorsports	Chevrolet	29	0	engine	4
41	74	Mike Harmon	Mike Harmon Racing	Chevrolet	29	0	running	3
42	68	Carl Long	Fleur-de-lis Motorsports	Chevrolet	4	0	overheating	2
43	44	Jeff Green	TriStar Motorsports	Chevrolet	3	0	vibration	1
Official Race results

Previous race: 2011 Bucyrus 200	NASCAR Nationwide Series; 2011 season	Next race: 2011 Feed the Children 300
