= 2010 Bucyrus 200 =

Race details
- Map of Speedway
- Date: June 19, 2010
- Official name: 2010 Bucyrus 200 Presented by Menards
- Location: Road America in Elkhart Lake, Wisconsin
- Course: Road Course
- Course length: 4.048 miles (6.515 km)
- Distance: 50 laps, 202 mi (325.087 km)
- Weather: Sunny
- Average speed: 68.501 mph (110.242 km/h)
- Attendance: 50,000

Pole position
Driver	Carl Edwards	Roush Fenway Racing
- Time: 2:14.838

Most laps led
Driver	Carl Edwards	Roush Fenway Racing
- Laps: 35

Winner
No. 60	Carl Edwards	Roush Fenway Racing

Television in the United States
- Network: ESPN2
- Announcers: Allen Bestwick, Rusty Wallace, Andy Petree

The 2010 Bucyrus 200 presented by Menards was a NASCAR Nationwide Series race held on June 19, 2010, at Road America in Elkhart Lake, Wisconsin. The race was the 15th race of the 2010 NASCAR Nationwide Series. The race was also the inaugural iteration of the event. It was also the first NASCAR race to be run at Road America since the then Grand National Series in 1956. Carl Edwards dominated the race by winning the pole, leading the most laps, and winning the race.

== Background ==
Road America is a motorsport road course located near Elkhart Lake, Wisconsin, United States on Wisconsin Highway 67. It has hosted races since the 1950s and currently hosts races in the NASCAR Cup and Xfinity Series, WeatherTech SportsCar Championship, IndyCar Series, SCCA Pirelli World Challenge, ASRA, AMA Superbike series, and SCCA Pro Racing's Trans-Am Series.

=== Entry list ===
- (R) denotes rookie driver

#	Driver	Team	Make
01	Mike Wallace	JD Motorsports	Chevrolet
04	Kevin Lepage	JD Motorsports	Chevrolet
05	Victor Gonzalez Jr.	Day Enterprise Racing	Chevrolet
6	Ricky Stenhouse Jr. (R)	Roush Fenway Racing	Ford
7	J. R. Fitzpatrick	JR Motorsports	Chevrolet
09	Robb Brent	RAB Racing	Ford
10	Tayler Malsam	Braun Racing	Toyota
11	Brian Scott (R)	Braun Racing	Toyota
12	Justin Allgaier	Penske Racing	Dodge
15	Michael Annett	Germain Racing	Toyota
16	Colin Braun (R)	Roush Fenway Racing	Ford
18	Brad Coleman	Joe Gibbs Racing	Toyota
20	Matt DiBenedetto	Joe Gibbs Racing	Toyota
21	Tim George Jr.	Richard Childress Racing	Chevrolet
22	Brad Keselowski	Penske Racing	Dodge
23	Alex Kennedy	R3 Motorsports	Chevrolet
24	Eric McClure	Team Rensi Motorsports	Ford
26	Brian Keselowski	K-Automotive Motorsports	Dodge
27	Owen Kelly	Baker Curb Racing	Ford
28	Kenny Wallace	Jay Robinson Racing	Chevrolet
31	Stanton Barrett	Rick Ware Racing	Chevrolet
32	Jacques Villeneuve	Braun Racing	Toyota
33	Ron Hornaday Jr.	Kevin Harvick Inc.	Chevrolet
34	Tony Raines	TriStar Motorsports	Chevrolet
35	Tony Ave	TriStar Motorsports	Chevrolet
38	Jason Leffler	Braun Racing	Toyota
40	Mike Bliss	Key Motorsports	Chevrolet
43	Kevin O'Connell	Baker Curb Racing	Chevrolet
56	Joey Scarallo	Mac Hill Motorsports	Ford
59	Kyle Kelley	Team Kelley Racing	Chevrolet
60	Carl Edwards	Roush Fenway Racing	Ford
61	Josh Wise	Specialty Racing	Ford
62	Brendan Gaughan	Rusty Wallace Racing	Toyota
66	Steve Wallace	Rusty Wallace Racing	Toyota
70	Mark Green	ML Motorsports	Chevrolet
81	Michael McDowell	MacDonald Motorsports	Dodge
87	Antonio Pérez	NEMCO Motorsports	Chevrolet
88	Ron Fellows	JR Motorsports	Chevrolet
89	Morgan Shepherd	Faith Motorsports	Chevrolet
90	Patrick Long	D'Hondt Humphrey Motorsports	Toyota
92	Andy Ponstein	K-Automotive Motorsports	Dodge
98	Paul Menard	Roush Fenway Racing	Ford
99	Trevor Bayne	Diamond-Waltrip Racing	Toyota
Official Entry List

== Qualifying ==
Carl Edwards won the pole with a time of 2:14.838 and a speed of 108.076.

Grid	No.	Driver	Team	Manufacturer	Time	Speed
1	60	Carl Edwards	Roush Fenway Racing	Ford	2:14.838	108.076
2	32	Jacques Villeneuve	Braun Racing	Toyota	2:15.265	107.735
3	16	Colin Braun (R)	Roush Fenway Racing	Ford	2:15.518	107.534
4	18	Brad Coleman	Joe Gibbs Racing	Toyota	2:15.763	107.340
5	81	Michael McDowell	MacDonald Motorsports	Dodge	2:15.824	107.292
6	62	Brendan Gaughan	Rusty Wallace Racing	Toyota	2:15.838	107.281
7	90	Patrick Long	D'Hondt Humphrey Motorsports	Toyota	2:15.894	107.237
8	98	Paul Menard	Roush Fenway Racing	Ford	2:16.062	107.104
9	27	Owen Kelly	Baker Curb Racing	Ford	2:16.064	107.103
10	35	Tony Ave	TriStar Motorsports	Chevrolet	2:16.492	106.767
11	33	Ron Hornaday Jr.	Kevin Harvick Inc.	Chevrolet	2:16.513	106.750
12	88	Ron Fellows	JR Motorsports	Chevrolet	2:16.519	106.746
13	22	Brad Keselowski	Penske Racing	Dodge	2:16.951	106.409
14	20	Matt DiBenedetto	Joe Gibbs Racing	Toyota	2:16.958	106.403
15	23	Alex Kennedy	R3 Motorsports	Chevrolet	2:16.969	106.395
16	6	Ricky Stenhouse Jr. (R)	Roush Fenway Racing	Ford	2:17.065	106.320
17	66	Steve Wallace	Rusty Wallace Racing	Toyota	2:17.217	106.203
18	12	Justin Allgaier	Penske Racing	Dodge	2:17.263	106.167
19	38	Jason Leffler	Braun Racing	Toyota	2:17.449	106.023
20	99	Trevor Bayne	Diamond-Waltrip Racing	Toyota	2:17.732	105.805
21	11	Brian Scott (R)	Braun Racing	Toyota	2:17.912	105.667
22	15	Michael Annett*	Germain Racing	Toyota	2:17.957	105.633
23	7	J. R. Fitzpatrick	JR Motorsports	Chevrolet	2:17.972	105.621
24	87	Antonio Pérez	NEMCO Motorsports	Chevrolet	2:18.088	105.533
25	09	Robb Brent	RAB Racing	Ford	2:18.273	105.392
26	40	Mike Bliss	Key Motorsports	Chevrolet	2:18.518	105.205
27	34	Tony Raines	TriStar Motorsports	Chevrolet	2:18.568	105.167
28	10	Tayler Malsam	Braun Racing	Toyota	2:18.797	104.994
29	21	Tim George Jr.	Richard Childress Racing	Chevrolet	2:19.007	104.835
30	31	Stanton Barrett	Rick Ware Racing	Chevrolet	2:19.098	104.766
31	05	Victor Gonzalez Jr.	Day Enterprise Racing	Chevrolet	2:19.246	104.655
32	43	Kevin O'Connell	Baker Curb Racing	Chevrolet	2:19.800	104.240
33	01	Mike Wallace	JD Motorsports	Chevrolet	2:20.616	103.635
34	59	Kyle Kelley	Team Kelley Racing	Chevrolet	2:22.493	102.270
35	89	Morgan Shepherd	Faith Motorsports	Chevrolet	2:23.749	101.377
36	28	Kenny Wallace	Jay Robinson Racing	Chevrolet	2:25.480	100.170
37	56	Joey Scarallo	Mac Hill Motorsports	Ford	2:25.633	100.065
38	70	Mark Green	ML Motorsports	Chevrolet	2:26.236	99.653
39	26	Brian Keselowski	K-Automotive Motorsports	Dodge	2:26.877	99.218
40	24	Eric McClure	Team Rensi Motorsports	Ford	2:27.355	98.896
41	61	Josh Wise	Specialty Racing	Ford	2:30.990	96.515
42	92	Andy Ponstein	K-Automotive Motorsports	Dodge	2:31.601	96.126
43	04	Kevin Lepage	JD Motorsports	Chevrolet	2:35.021	94.005
Official Starting Grid

* – Michael Annett was sent to the rear of the field for improper impound adjustments.

== Race ==
Pole sitter Carl Edwards led the first lap of the race. The first caution did not take long as it flew on lap 2 when Justin Allgaier's car stalled in turn 5 after the driveshaft broke after his car went onto the rumble strips. During the caution, Eric McClure was taken out of his car and replaced by Chris Cook, who has been a veteran at Road Courses, after McClure had surgery earlier in the week. The race restarted on lap 5 with Edwards remaining as the leader. On the same lap in turn 6, Brendan Gaughan's car spun and kept his car rolling so no caution was thrown. On lap 6, Tim George Jr's car spun in turn 3. No caution was thrown as he got his car going. On lap 12, the second caution flew when Antonio Pérez's engine blew and laid fluid on the track which caused Chris Cook to spin in turn 14. Carl Edwards won the race off of pit road but Jason Leffler, Mike Bliss, and Morgan Shepherd did not pit, but Shepherd went to pit before the green flag dropped, while Brendan Gaughan had already pitted when the caution flew and Leffler led the field to the restart on lap 15. On the restart, Carl Edwards immeadietly challenged Jason Leffler for the lead and took the lead in turn 5. On lap 22, J. R. Fitzpatrick spun in turn 1 after what appeared to be contact with Jason Leffler. Fitzpatrick got his car rolling and no caution was thrown but he had damage to the right rear of his car.

=== Final laps ===
With 24 laps to go, the third caution flew when Colin Braun spun in turn 1. Edwards won the race off of pit road but Patrick Long, Steve Wallace, and Victor Gonzalez Jr. did not pit and Long led the field to the restart with 21 laps to go. On the restart, a big wreck would occur in turn 6 taking out 9 cars. It started when Brian Scott got turned by Brendan Gaughan and cause a stack up that collected Stanton Barrett, Kyle Kelley, Mike Bliss, Colin Braun, Tony Raines, Robb Brent, Alex Kennedy, and Jason Leffler. During the caution, Patrick Long went onto pit road and gave the lead to Carl Edwards. A red flag occurred for the pile up in turn 6. The red flag lasted for about 30 minutes before it was lifted. As the red flag was lifted, some cars like Edwards went onto pit road while others like Brad Coleman stayed out and Coleman was the new leader. Coleman was looking for his first NASCAR win of his career in his 54th Nationwide Series start. The race restarted with 17 laps to go. With 16 laps to go, Michael McDowell's engine let go. No fluid was laid onto the track. With 14 to go, the 5th caution flew when Ron Hornaday and Tim George Jr. crashed in turn 3. The race would restart with 12 laps to go. But on the restart, Brad Keselowski bumped Brad Coleman in turn 1 and it sent Coleman up the track. Coleman would lose the lead and many positions as he fell back to the outside of the top 10. Keselowski and Brendan Gaughan fought for the lead. Gaughan took the lead but pushed himself up the track in turn 5 and Jacques Villeneuve took the lead. Villeneuve was also looking for his first NASCAR win. But the 6th caution would fly during the same lap when Alex Kennedy and Mike Bliss crashed in turn 12. The race would restart with 9 laps to go. On the restart, Carl Edwards took the lead from Jacques Villeneuve. In turn 12 on the same lap, Patrick Long spun after contact with J. R. Fitzpatrick and Brad Keselowski. He got his car rolling and no caution was thrown. With 8 to go, two cars spun in different turns. Victor Gonzalez Jr. and Brian Scott spun in turns 5 and 8 after Gonzalez had contact with Paul Menard and Scott spun after he had contact with Colin Braun. No caution was thrown as they got going again. With 6 to go, the 7th and final caution flew when Stanton Barrett spun in turn 6. The race restarted with 3 laps to go. On the same lap, Mike Wallace and Victor Gonzalez Jr. spun in turns 6 and 12 but no caution was thrown. On the final lap, Tony Ave spun in turn 5. No caution flew. Carl Edwards held off everybody as Villeneuve fell back and Edwards was the first Nationwide Series winner at Road America. This would be Edwards' first of four wins in 2010 but was not enough to win the Championship as he finished 2nd to Brad Keselowski. Ron Fellows, Brendan Gaughan, Brad Keselowski, and Owen Kelly rounded out the top 5 while Brad Coleman, J. R. Fitzpatrick, Jason Leffler, Steve Wallace, and Trevor Bayne rounded out the top 10.

== Race results ==
Pos	Car	Driver	Team	Manufacturer	Laps Run	Laps Led	Status	Points
1	60	Carl Edwards	Roush Fenway Racing	Ford	50	35	running	195
2	88	Ron Fellows	JR Motorsports	Chevrolet	50	0	running	170
3	62	Brendan Gaughan	Rusty Wallace Racing	Toyota	50	0	running	165
4	22	Brad Keselowski	Penske Racing	Dodge	50	0	running	160
5	27	Owen Kelly	Baker Curb Racing	Ford	50	0	running	155
6	18	Brad Coleman	Joe Gibbs Racing	Toyota	50	7	running	155
7	7	J. R. Fitzpatrick	JR Motorsports	Chevrolet	50	0	running	146
8	38	Jason Leffler	Braun Racing	Toyota	50	3	running	147
9	66	Steve Wallace	Rusty Wallace Racing	Toyota	50	0	running	138
10	99	Trevor Bayne	Diamond-Waltrip Racing	Toyota	50	0	running	134
11	16	Colin Braun (R)	Roush Fenway Racing	Ford	50	0	running	130
12	33	Ron Hornaday Jr.	Kevin Harvick Inc.	Chevrolet	50	0	running	127
13	11	Brian Scott (R)	Braun Racing	Toyota	50	0	running	124
14	90	Patrick Long	D'Hondt Humphrey Motorsports	Toyota	50	2	running	126
15	10	Tayler Malsam	Braun Racing	Toyota	50	0	running	118
16	98	Paul Menard	Roush Fenway Racing	Ford	50	0	running	115
17	31	Stanton Barrett	Rick Ware Racing	Chevrolet	50	0	running	112
18	01	Mike Wallace	JD Motorsports	Chevrolet	50	0	running	109
19	89	Morgan Shepherd	Faith Motorsports	Chevrolet	50	0	running	106
20	35	Tony Ave	TriStar Motorsports	Chevrolet	50	0	running	103
21	28	Kenny Wallace	Jay Robinson Racing	Chevrolet	50	0	running	100
22	70	Mark Green	ML Motorsports	Chevrolet	50	0	running	97
23	05	Victor Gonzalez Jr.	Day Enterprise Racing	Chevrolet	50	0	running	94
24	15	Michael Annett	Germain Racing	Toyota	50	0	running	91
25	32	Jacques Villeneuve	Braun Racing	Toyota	49	0	running	93
26	6	Ricky Stenhouse Jr. (R)	Roush Fenway Racing	Ford	49	0	running	85
27	24	Eric McClure	Team Rensi Motorsports	Ford	46	0	running	82
28	23	Alex Kennedy	R3 Motorsports	Chevrolet	46	0	running	79
29	20	Matt DiBenedetto	Joe Gibbs Racing	Toyota	44	0	running	76
30	09	Robb Brent	RAB Racing	Ford	43	0	running	73
31	40	Mike Bliss	Key Motorsports	Chevrolet	38	0	crash	70
32	21	Tim George Jr.	Richard Childress Racing	Chevrolet	36	0	crash	67
33	81	Michael McDowell	MacDonald Motorsports	Dodge	34	0	engine	64
34	43	Kevin O'Connell	Baker Curb Racing	Chevrolet	34	0	engine	61
35	12	Justin Allgaier	Penske Racing	Dodge	30	0	running	58
36	34	Tony Raines	TriStar Motorsports	Chevrolet	29	0	engine	55
37	59	Kyle Kelley	Team Kelley Racing	Chevrolet	29	0	crash	52
38	87	Antonio Pérez	NEMCO Motorsports	Chevrolet	10	0	engine	49
39	56	Joey Scarallo	Mac Hill Motorsports	Ford	8	0	brakes	46
40	26	Brian Keselowski	K-Automotive Motorsports	Dodge	3	0	transmission	43
41	61	Josh Wise	Specialty Racing	Ford	1	0	brakes	40
42	92	Andy Ponstein	K-Automotive Motorsports	Dodge	1	0	suspension	37
43	04	Kevin Lepage	JD Motorsports	Chevrolet	1	0	rear end	34
Official Race results

Previous race: 2010 Meijer 300	NASCAR Nationwide Series; 2010 season	Next race: 2010 New England 200
