= 2009 NASCAR Mini Stock Series =

Seasons
- ← none 2010 →

The 2009 NASCAR Mini Stock Series season was the first to be run under this name. It is the feeder division of the NASCAR Corona Series. It was formerly known as NASCAR Mexico T4 Series. Ernesto Guerrero ended up as series champion, edging out Erik Mondragón by just two points.

== Cars ==
This year the series entered a transition stage, in which the field of front-wheel drive touring cars used in the T4 Series in previous years was changed for rear-wheel drive stock cars, as a way to help the drivers develop their abilities and prepare for the next steps in their careers. However, for this season the old front-wheel drive cars were grandfathered into the series.

Ironically, in the first two races of the season, the newly built rear-wheel drive cars were affected by reliability issues that have given some advantage to the drivers running with the old car.

It was the first four-cylinder series in NASCAR since the mid-1990s Goody's Dash Series in the United States, which was a 4-cylinder series from its 1975 inception as the Baby Grand National, until 1998, when six-cylinder engines were permitted.

Chevrolet Astra and Mazda3 was used in this season.

== Drivers ==
These are the entries for the 2009 season.

No.	Driver	Team
04	(Mexico) Daniel Suárez	HO Speed Racing
6	(Mexico) Rodrigo Marbán	Guerrero Motorsports
7	(Mexico) Ernesto Guerrero	Guerrero Motorsports
11	(Mexico) Enrique Contreras III	HO Speed Racing
12	(Mexico) Edgardo Dávalos (R)	Sport Racing
13	(Mexico) Juan Carlos Blum (R)	Team GP
19	(Mexico) Edgar Mondragón	MRT
20	(Mexico) Erik Mondragón	MRT
22	(Mexico) David Arrayales (R)	Megaracing
48	(Mexico) Max Calles (R)	Akron
65	(Mexico) Julián Islas	Islas Motorsport

(R) Denotes Rookie.

== Race calendar ==
The race calendar for this season and results is as follows:

No.	Race title	Track	Date	Time
1	Aguascalientes	Autódromo Internacional de Aguascalientes	April 12	
2	San Luis Potosí	(San Luis Potosí) Autódromo Potosino	May 31	
3	Puebla	(Puebla) Autódromo Miguel E. Abed	June 14	
4	Querétaro	Autódromo Querétaro	June 28	
5	Guadalajara	(Jalisco) Trióvalo Bernardo Obregón	July 19	
6	San Luis Potosí	(San Luis Potosí) Autódromo Potosino	August 16	
7	Puebla	(Puebla) Autódromo Miguel E. Abed	September 6	
8	Querétaro	Autódromo Querétaro	October 11	
9	Mexico City	(Mexico City) Autódromo Hermanos Rodríguez	October 25	
10	Tuxtla Gutiérrez (Chiapas)	Autódromo Chiapas	November 8	
11	Aguascalientes	Autódromo Internacional de Aguascalientes	November 22	

== Results ==
=== Races ===
Round	Race	Pole position	Most laps led	Winning driver	Manufacturer
1	Aguascalientes	(Querétaro) Erik Mondragón	(Querétaro) Erik Mondragón	(Mexico City) Enrique Contreras III	(Japan) Mazda
2	San Luis Potosí	(Mexico City) Enrique Contreras III^{1}	(Mexico City) Ernesto Guerrero	(Mexico City) Ernesto Guerrero	(Japan) Mazda
3	Puebla	(Jalisco) David Arrayales	(Jalisco) David Arrayales	(Jalisco) David Arrayales	(United States) Chevrolet
4	Querétaro	(Mexico City) Enrique Contreras III	(Mexico City) Ernesto Guerrero	(Mexico City) Ernesto Guerrero	(United States) Chevrolet
5	(Jalisco) Guadalajara	(San Luis Potosí) Alex Villasana, Jr.	(San Luis Potosí) Alex Villasana, Jr.	(Mexico City) Ernesto Guerrero	(United States) Chevrolet
6	San Luis Potosí	(Mexico City) Enrique Contreras III	(Jalisco) Juan Carlos Blum	(Jalisco) Juan Carlos Blum	(Japan) Mazda
7	Puebla	(Mexico City) Ernesto Guerrero^{2}	(Jalisco) David Arrayales	(Jalisco) David Arrayales	(United States) Chevrolet
8	Querétaro	(Jalisco) Juan Carlos Blum	(Jalisco) Juan Carlos Blum / (Querétaro) Rodrigo Marbán	(Jalisco) Juan Carlos Blum	(Japan) Mazda
9	Mexico City	(Mexico City) Ernesto Guerrero	(Tamaulipas) Max Calles	(Jalisco) Juan Carlos Blum	(Japan) Mazda
10	Tuxtla Gutiérrez (Chiapas)	(Mexico City) Ernesto Guerrero	(Mexico City) Enrique Contreras III	(Mexico City) Enrique Contreras III	(Japan) Mazda
11	Aguascalientes	(Jalisco) David Arrayales	(Jalisco) Juan Carlos Blum	(Tamaulipas) Manolin Gutiérrez	(United States) Chevrolet

Qualifying washed out.
Qualifying washed out.

=== Standings ===
(key) Bold - Pole position awarded by time. Italics - Pole position set by final practice results or rainout. * – Most laps led.

Rank	Driver	(Aguascalientes) AGS	(San Luis Potosí) SLP	(Puebla) PUE	(Querétaro) QRO	(Jalisco) GDL	(San Luis Potosí) SLP	(Puebla) PUE	(Querétaro) QRO	(Mexico City) MXC	(Chiapas) TXG	(Aguascalientes) AGS	Points
1	(Mexico) Ernesto Guerrero	4	1*	3	1*	1	2	8	7	**8**	**8**	4	1787
2	(Mexico) Erik Mondragón	**5***	2	2	5	3	4	2	3	5	5	2	1785
3	(Mexico) David Arrayales **(R)**	2	7	**1***	2	10	6	1*	2	9	4	**9**	1766
4	(Mexico) Enrique Contreras III	1	4	4	**6**	5	**8**	5	5	6	1*	11	1752
5	(Mexico) Edgar Mondragón	3	3	10	3	4	13	7	8	3	3	3	1709
6	(Mexico) Juan Carlos Blum **(R)**	8	6	7	7	7	1*	6	**1***	1	6	5*	1670
7	(Mexico) Rodrigo Marbán **(R)**	9	9	5	10	8	5	4	4*	10	7	8	1629
8	(Mexico) Max Calles **(R)**	6	5	6	9	6	3	9	10	2*		10	1509
9	(Mexico) Alex Villasana, Jr.					**2***	9	3	9	4		12	868
10	(Mexico) Daniel Suárez	10	11	9	8	9	7						833
11	(Mexico) Ignacio Fontes **(R)**								6	7		6	451
12	(Mexico) Julián Islas	7	10		4								445
13	(Mexico) Manolin Gutierrez **(R)**										2	1	345
14	(Mexico) Diego Moguel **(R)**										9	7	284
15	(Mexico) Edgardo Davalos		8				11						272
16	(Mexico) Agustin Arriaga					11	12						256
17	(Mexico) José Mora			8									142
18	(Mexico) Pablo Campos						10						134
Rank	Driver	(Aguascalientes) AGS	(San Luis Potosí) SLP	(Puebla) PUE	(Querétaro) QRO	(Jalisco) GDL	(San Luis Potosí) SLP	(Puebla) PUE	(Querétaro) QRO	(Mexico City) MXC	(Chiapas) TXG	(Aguascalientes) AGS	Points
	References												

== See also ==
- 2009 NASCAR Sprint Cup Series
- 2009 NASCAR Nationwide Series
- 2009 NASCAR Camping World Truck Series
- 2009 NASCAR Camping World East Series
- 2009 NASCAR Camping World West Series
- 2009 ARCA Re/Max Series
- 2009 NASCAR Whelen Modified Tour
- 2009 NASCAR Whelen Southern Modified Tour
- 2009 NASCAR Canadian Tire Series
- 2009 NASCAR Corona Series
