= 2013 DuPont Pioneer 250 =

12th race of the 2013 NASCAR Nationwide Series

Race details
- Race 12 of 33 of the 2013 NASCAR Nationwide Series
- Date: June 9, 2013
- Official name: 3rd Annual DuPont Pioneer 250
- Location: Newton, Iowa, Iowa Speedway
- Course: Permanent racing facility
- Course length: 0.875 miles (1.408 km)
- Distance: 250 laps, 218.75 mi (352.044 km)
- Scheduled distance: 250 laps, 218.75 mi (352.044 km)
- Average speed: 102.472 miles per hour (164.913 km/h)

Pole position
Driver	Austin Dillon	Richard Childress Racing
- Time: 23.037

Most laps led
Driver	Austin Dillon	Richard Childress Racing
- Laps: 207

Winner
No. 6	Trevor Bayne	Roush Fenway Racing

Television in the United States
- Network: ESPN
- Announcers: Allen Bestwick, Dale Jarrett, Andy Petree

Radio in the United States
- Radio: Motor Racing Network

The 2013 DuPont Pioneer 250 was the 12th stock car race of the 2013 NASCAR Nationwide Series and the 3rd iteration of the event. The race was originally scheduled to be held on Saturday, June 8, 2013, but was delayed to Sunday, June 9, due to rain. The race was held in Newton, Iowa at Iowa Speedway, a 7/8 mile (1.4 km) permanent D-shaped oval racetrack. At race's end, Trevor Bayne, driving for Roush Fenway Racing, would make a late-race pass on eventual second-place finisher, Richard Childress Racing driver Austin Dillon to win his second and to date, final career NASCAR Nationwide Series win and his first and only win of the season. To fill out the podium, Elliott Sadler of Joe Gibbs Racing would finish third.

== Background ==
Iowa Speedway is a 7/8-mile (1.4 km) paved oval motor racing track in Newton, Iowa, United States, approximately 30 miles (48 km) east of Des Moines. The track was designed with influence from Rusty Wallace and patterned after Richmond Raceway, a short track where Wallace was very successful. It has over 25,000 permanent seats as well as a unique multi-tiered Recreational Vehicle viewing area along the backstretch.

=== Entry list ===
#	Driver	Team	Make	Sponsor
00	Blake Koch	SR² Motorsports	Toyota	JW Demolition
01	Mike Wallace	JD Motorsports	Chevrolet	G&K Services
2	Brian Scott	Richard Childress Racing	Chevrolet	Shore Lodge
3	Austin Dillon	Richard Childress Racing	Chevrolet	AdvoCare
4	Daryl Harr	JD Motorsports	Chevrolet	iWorld
5	Brad Sweet	JR Motorsports	Chevrolet	Great Clips
6	Trevor Bayne	Roush Fenway Racing	Ford	Ford EcoBoost
7	Regan Smith	JR Motorsports	Chevrolet	TaxSlayer
10	Jeff Green	TriStar Motorsports	Toyota	TriStar Motorsports
11	Elliott Sadler	Joe Gibbs Racing	Toyota	OneMain Financial
12	Sam Hornish Jr.	Penske Racing	Ford	Alliance Truck Parts
14	Eric McClure	TriStar Motorsports	Toyota	Hefty, Reynolds Wrap
15	Carl Long	Rick Ware Racing	Ford	FAIR Girls
19	Mike Bliss	TriStar Motorsports	Toyota	TriStar Motorsports
20	Brian Vickers	Joe Gibbs Racing	Toyota	Dollar General
22	Joey Logano*	Penske Racing	Ford	Discount Tire
23	Harrison Rhodes	Rick Ware Racing	Ford	Clawdog Affordable Websites
24	Ken Butler III	SR² Motorsports	Toyota	JW Demolition, Five Star Lodge & Stables
29	Kenny Wallace	RAB Racing	Toyota	U.S. Cellular
30	Nelson Piquet Jr.	Turner Scott Motorsports	Chevrolet	Qualcomm
31	Justin Allgaier	Turner Scott Motorsports	Chevrolet	Brandt Professional Agriculture
32	Kyle Larson	Turner Scott Motorsports	Chevrolet	Hulu Plus, Vizio
33	Max Papis	Richard Childress Racing	Chevrolet	Menards, Rheem
40	Reed Sorenson	The Motorsports Group	Chevrolet	Swisher E-Cigarette
42	T. J. Bell	The Motorsports Group	Chevrolet	The Motorsports Group
43	Michael Annett	Richard Petty Motorsports	Ford	Pilot Flying J
44	Cole Whitt	TriStar Motorsports	Toyota	TriStar Motorsports
46	Jason Bowles	The Motorsports Group	Chevrolet	The Motorsports Group
51	Jeremy Clements	Jeremy Clements Racing	Chevrolet	RepairableVehicles.com
52	Tim Schendel	Jimmy Means Racing	Chevrolet	Jimmy Means Racing
54	Drew Herring	Joe Gibbs Racing	Toyota	Monster Energy
60	Travis Pastrana	Roush Fenway Racing	Ford	Roush Fenway Racing
70	Johanna Long	ML Motorsports	Chevrolet	Foretravel Motorcoach
74	Juan Carlos Blum	Mike Harmon Racing	Chevrolet	Oleofinos
77	Parker Kligerman	Kyle Busch Motorsports	Toyota	Toyota
79	Joey Gase	Go Green Racing	Ford	Iowa Donor Network
87	Joe Nemechek**	NEMCO Motorsports	Toyota	Herbal Mist Tea
89	Morgan Shepherd	Shepherd Racing Ventures	Chevrolet	Racing with Jesus
92	Dexter Stacey	KH Motorsports	Ford	Maddie's Place Rocks
98	Kevin Swindell	Biagi-DenBeste Racing	Ford	Carroll Shelby Engine Co., DenBeste Water Solutions
99	Alex Bowman	RAB Racing	Toyota	SchoolTipline
Official entry list

*Driver changed to Ryan Blaney so Logano could race in the 2013 Party in the Poconos 400.

**Driver changed to Kevin Lepage so Nemechek could race in the 2013 Party in the Poconos 400.

== Practice ==
=== First practice ===
The first practice session was held on Friday, June 7, at 3:30 PM CST, and would last for an hour and 20 minutes. Alex Bowman of RAB Racing would set the fastest time in the session, with a lap of 23.332 and an average speed of 135.008 miles per hour (217.274 km/h).

Pos.	#	Driver	Team	Make	Time	Speed
1	99	Alex Bowman	RAB Racing	Toyota	23.332	135.008
2	32	Kyle Larson	Turner Scott Motorsports	Chevrolet	23.553	133.741
3	29	Kenny Wallace	RAB Racing	Toyota	23.637	133.266
Full first practice results

=== Second and final practice ===
The second and final practice session, sometimes referred to as Happy Hour, was held on Friday, June 7, at 6:00 PM CST, and would last for an hour and 20 minutes. Austin Dillon of Richard Childress Racing would set the fastest time in the session, with a lap of 23.181 and an average speed of 135.887 miles per hour (218.689 km/h).

Pos.	#	Driver	Team	Make	Time	Speed
1	3	Austin Dillon	Richard Childress Racing	Chevrolet	23.181	135.887
2	5	Brad Sweet	JR Motorsports	Chevrolet	23.233	135.583
3	77	Parker Kligerman	Kyle Busch Motorsports	Toyota	23.244	135.519
Full Happy Hour practice results

== Qualifying ==
Qualifying was held on Saturday, June 8, at 4:05 PM CST. Each driver would have two laps to set a fastest time; the fastest of the two would count as their official qualifying lap.

Austin Dillon of Richard Childress Racing would win the pole, setting a time of 23.037 and an average speed of 136.737 miles per hour (220.057 km/h).

Morgan Shepherd would be the only driver to fail to qualify.

=== Full qualifying results ===
Pos.	#	Driver	Team	Make	Time	Speed
1	3	Austin Dillon	Richard Childress Racing	Chevrolet	23.037	136.737
2	12	Sam Hornish Jr.	Penske Racing	Ford	23.190	135.834
3	2	Brian Scott	Richard Childress Racing	Chevrolet	23.194	135.811
4	20	Brian Vickers	Joe Gibbs Racing	Toyota	23.207	135.735
5	7	Regan Smith	JR Motorsports	Chevrolet	23.231	135.595
6	22	Ryan Blaney	Penske Racing	Ford	23.250	135.484
7	11	Elliott Sadler	Joe Gibbs Racing	Toyota	23.261	135.420
8	60	Travis Pastrana	Roush Fenway Racing	Ford	23.263	135.408
9	54	Drew Herring	Joe Gibbs Racing	Toyota	23.286	135.274
10	32	Kyle Larson	Turner Scott Motorsports	Chevrolet	23.298	135.205
11	31	Justin Allgaier	Turner Scott Motorsports	Chevrolet	23.308	135.147
12	77	Parker Kligerman	Kyle Busch Motorsports	Toyota	23.313	135.118
13	29	Kenny Wallace	RAB Racing	Toyota	23.318	135.089
14	6	Trevor Bayne	Roush Fenway Racing	Ford	23.330	135.019
15	99	Alex Bowman	RAB Racing	Toyota	23.337	134.979
16	5	Brad Sweet	JR Motorsports	Chevrolet	23.352	134.892
17	19	Mike Bliss	TriStar Motorsports	Toyota	23.438	134.397
18	43	Michael Annett	Richard Petty Motorsports	Ford	23.456	134.294
19	44	Cole Whitt	TriStar Motorsports	Toyota	23.523	133.911
20	98	Kevin Swindell	Biagi-DenBeste Racing	Ford	23.524	133.906
21	70	Johanna Long	ML Motorsports	Chevrolet	23.564	133.678
22	30	Nelson Piquet Jr.	Turner Scott Motorsports	Chevrolet	23.584	133.565
23	00	Blake Koch	SR² Motorsports	Toyota	23.599	133.480
24	51	Jeremy Clements	Jeremy Clements Racing	Chevrolet	23.610	133.418
25	33	Max Papis	Richard Childress Racing	Chevrolet	23.621	133.356
26	92	Dexter Stacey	KH Motorsports	Ford	23.641	133.243
27	40	Reed Sorenson	The Motorsports Group	Chevrolet	23.689	132.973
28	87	Kevin Lepage	NEMCO Motorsports	Toyota	23.697	132.928
29	46	Jason Bowles	The Motorsports Group	Chevrolet	23.774	132.498
30	14	Eric McClure	TriStar Motorsports	Toyota	23.834	132.164
31	23	Harrison Rhodes	Rick Ware Racing	Ford	23.848	132.087
32	79	Joey Gase	Go Green Racing	Ford	23.880	131.910
33	15	Carl Long	Rick Ware Racing	Ford	23.882	131.899
34	10	Jeff Green	TriStar Motorsports	Toyota	23.888	131.865
35	42	T. J. Bell	The Motorsports Group	Chevrolet	23.894	131.832
36	01	Mike Wallace	JD Motorsports	Chevrolet	23.924	131.667
37	24	Ken Butler III	SR² Motorsports	Toyota	23.964	131.447
38	74	Juan Carlos Blum	Mike Harmon Racing	Chevrolet	24.060	130.923
Qualified by owner's points
39	4	Daryl Harr	JD Motorsports	Chevrolet	24.519	128.472
Last car to qualify on time
40	52	Tim Schendel	Jimmy Means Racing	Chevrolet	24.096	130.727
Failed to qualify
41	89	Morgan Shepherd	Shepherd Racing Ventures	Chevrolet	24.285	129.710
Official starting lineup

== Race results ==
Fin	St	#	Driver	Team	Make	Laps	Led	Status	Pts	Winnings
1	14	6	Trevor Bayne	Roush Fenway Racing	Ford	250	19	running	47	$86,690
2	1	3	Austin Dillon	Richard Childress Racing	Chevrolet	250	207	running	44	$68,500
3	7	11	Elliott Sadler	Joe Gibbs Racing	Toyota	250	0	running	41	$49,400
4	2	12	Sam Hornish Jr.	Penske Racing	Ford	250	22	running	41	$35,350
5	10	32	Kyle Larson	Turner Scott Motorsports	Chevrolet	250	0	running	39	$33,175
6	3	2	Brian Scott	Richard Childress Racing	Chevrolet	250	0	running	38	$28,975
7	5	7	Regan Smith	JR Motorsports	Chevrolet	250	0	running	37	$27,835
8	11	31	Justin Allgaier	Turner Scott Motorsports	Chevrolet	250	0	running	36	$26,795
9	6	22	Ryan Blaney	Penske Racing	Ford	250	0	running	0	$25,675
10	17	19	Mike Bliss	TriStar Motorsports	Toyota	250	0	running	34	$25,975
11	9	54	Drew Herring	Joe Gibbs Racing	Toyota	250	0	running	33	$24,200
12	21	70	Johanna Long	ML Motorsports	Chevrolet	250	0	running	32	$17,650
13	13	29	Kenny Wallace	RAB Racing	Toyota	250	0	running	31	$17,125
14	12	77	Parker Kligerman	Kyle Busch Motorsports	Toyota	250	0	running	30	$22,600
15	27	40	Reed Sorenson	The Motorsports Group	Chevrolet	249	0	running	29	$22,425
16	19	44	Cole Whitt	TriStar Motorsports	Toyota	249	0	running	28	$22,550
17	24	51	Jeremy Clements	Jeremy Clements Racing	Chevrolet	248	0	running	27	$21,900
18	30	14	Eric McClure	TriStar Motorsports	Toyota	248	0	running	26	$21,450
19	28	87	Kevin Lepage	NEMCO Motorsports	Toyota	248	0	running	25	$21,225
20	36	01	Mike Wallace	JD Motorsports	Chevrolet	247	0	running	24	$21,675
21	26	92	Dexter Stacey	KH Motorsports	Ford	246	0	running	23	$14,875
22	15	99	Alex Bowman	RAB Racing	Toyota	244	0	running	22	$20,750
23	31	23	Harrison Rhodes	Rick Ware Racing	Ford	243	0	running	21	$20,600
24	39	4	Daryl Harr	JD Motorsports	Chevrolet	243	0	running	20	$20,475
25	22	30	Nelson Piquet Jr.	Turner Scott Motorsports	Chevrolet	243	0	running	19	$20,825
26	37	24	Ken Butler III	SR² Motorsports	Toyota	242	0	running	18	$20,225
27	32	79	Joey Gase	Go Green Racing	Ford	240	0	running	17	$20,100
28	20	98	Kevin Swindell	Biagi-DenBeste Racing	Ford	198	0	running	16	$13,950
29	4	20	Brian Vickers	Joe Gibbs Racing	Toyota	196	0	running	15	$19,825
30	18	43	Michael Annett	Richard Petty Motorsports	Ford	177	2	crash	15	$20,000
31	25	33	Max Papis	Richard Childress Racing	Chevrolet	155	0	crash	13	$19,550
32	8	60	Travis Pastrana	Roush Fenway Racing	Ford	154	0	crash	12	$19,455
33	40	52	Tim Schendel	Jimmy Means Racing	Chevrolet	64	0	transmission	11	$13,335
34	16	5	Brad Sweet	JR Motorsports	Chevrolet	35	0	engine	10	$19,215
35	38	74	Juan Carlos Blum	Mike Harmon Racing	Chevrolet	15	0	engine	9	$19,097
36	23	00	Blake Koch	SR² Motorsports	Toyota	10	0	brakes	8	$12,125
37	35	42	T. J. Bell	The Motorsports Group	Chevrolet	7	0	electrical	0	$12,015
38	33	15	Carl Long	Rick Ware Racing	Ford	5	0	axle	6	$11,936
39	29	46	Jason Bowles	The Motorsports Group	Chevrolet	5	0	vibration	0	$11,745
40	34	10	Jeff Green	TriStar Motorsports	Toyota	2	0	vibration	4	$11,630
Failed to qualify
41		89	Morgan Shepherd	Shepherd Racing Ventures	Chevrolet					
Official race results

Previous race: 2013 5-hour Energy 200 (June)	NASCAR Nationwide Series; 2013 season	Next race: 2013 Alliance Truck Parts 250
