= 2013 Alliance Truck Parts 250 =

13th race of the 2013 NASCAR Nationwide Series

Race details
- Race 13 of 33 of the 2013 NASCAR Nationwide Series
- Date: June 15, 2013
- Official name: 22nd Annual Alliance Truck Parts 250
- Location: Brooklyn, Michigan, Michigan International Speedway
- Course: Permanent racing facility
- Course length: 2 miles (3.2 km)
- Distance: 125 laps, 250 mi (402.336 km)
- Scheduled distance: 125 laps, 250 mi (402.336 km)
- Average speed: 137.825 miles per hour (221.808 km/h)

Pole position
Driver	Austin Dillon	Richard Childress Racing
- Time: 37.523

Most laps led
Driver	Austin Dillon	Richard Childress Racing
- Laps: 61

Winner
No. 7	Regan Smith	JR Motorsports

Television in the United States
- Network: ABC
- Announcers: Allen Bestwick, Dale Jarrett, Andy Petree

Radio in the United States
- Radio: Motor Racing Network

The 2013 Alliance Truck Parts 250 was the 13th stock car race of the 2013 NASCAR Nationwide Series and the 22nd iteration of the event. The race was held on Saturday, June 15, 2013, in Brooklyn, Michigan at Michigan International Speedway, a 2 miles (3.2 km) D-shaped oval. The race took the scheduled 125 laps to complete. At race's end, Regan Smith, driving for JR Motorsports, would pull away in the closing laps of the race to win his third career NASCAR Nationwide Series win and his second and final win of the season. To fill out the podium, Kyle Larson of Turner Scott Motorsports and Paul Menard of Richard Childress Racing would finish second and third, respectively.

== Background ==
The layout of Michigan International Speedway, the venue where the race was held.

The race was held at Michigan International Speedway, a two-mile (3.2 km) moderate-banked D-shaped speedway located in Brooklyn, Michigan. The track is used primarily for NASCAR events. It is known as a "sister track" to Texas World Speedway as MIS's oval design was a direct basis of TWS, with moderate modifications to the banking in the corners, and was used as the basis of Auto Club Speedway. The track is owned by International Speedway Corporation. Michigan International Speedway is recognized as one of motorsports' premier facilities because of its wide racing surface and high banking (by open-wheel standards; the 18-degree banking is modest by stock car standards).

=== Entry list ===
#	Driver	Team	Make	Sponsor
00	Ken Butler III	SR² Motorsports	Toyota	JW Demolition
01	Mike Wallace	JD Motorsports	Chevrolet	Brooklyn Products International
2	Brian Scott	Richard Childress Racing	Chevrolet	Shore Lodge
3	Austin Dillon	Richard Childress Racing	Chevrolet	AdvoCare
4	Landon Cassill	JD Motorsports	Chevrolet	Flex Seal Brite Patriotic
5	Brad Sweet	JR Motorsports	Chevrolet	Great Clips
6	Trevor Bayne	Roush Fenway Racing	Ford	Roush Cleantech
7	Regan Smith	JR Motorsports	Chevrolet	TaxSlayer
10	Jeff Green	TriStar Motorsports	Toyota	TriStar Motorsports
11	Elliott Sadler	Joe Gibbs Racing	Toyota	OneMain Financial
12	Sam Hornish Jr.	Penske Racing	Ford	Alliance Truck Parts
14	Eric McClure	TriStar Motorsports	Toyota	Reynolds Wrap, Hefty
15	Carl Long	Rick Ware Racing	Ford	FAIR Girls
16	Chris Buescher	Roush Fenway Racing	Ford	Ford EcoBoost
19	Mike Bliss	TriStar Motorsports	Toyota	TriStar Motorsports
20	Brian Vickers	Joe Gibbs Racing	Toyota	Dollar General
22	Joey Logano	Penske Racing	Ford	Discount Tire
23	Scott Riggs	SR² Motorsports	Ford	SR² Motorsports
24	Blake Koch	SR² Motorsports	Toyota	VIP Poker
30	Nelson Piquet Jr.	Turner Scott Motorsports	Chevrolet	Worx Yard Tools
31	Justin Allgaier	Turner Scott Motorsports	Chevrolet	Brandt Professional Agriculture
32	Kyle Larson	Turner Scott Motorsports	Chevrolet	Cessna
33	Paul Menard	Richard Childress Racing	Chevrolet	Menards, Rheem
40	Reed Sorenson	The Motorsports Group	Chevrolet	Swisher E-Cigarette
42	Josh Wise	The Motorsports Group	Chevrolet	The Motorsports Group
43	Michael Annett	Richard Petty Motorsports	Ford	Pilot Travel Centers
44	Cole Whitt	TriStar Motorsports	Toyota	Takagi Tankless Water Heaters
46	J. J. Yeley	The Motorsports Group	Chevrolet	The Motorsports Group
51	Jeremy Clements	Jeremy Clements Racing	Chevrolet	Diamond Pistons
52	Joey Gase	Jimmy Means Racing	Toyota	Donate Life
54	Kyle Busch	Joe Gibbs Racing	Toyota	Monster Energy
60	Travis Pastrana	Roush Fenway Racing	Ford	Roush Fenway Racing
70	Johanna Long	ML Motorsports	Chevrolet	Foretravel Motorcoach
74	Juan Carlos Blum	Mike Harmon Racing	Chevrolet	Oleofinos, VMP Nutrition
77	Parker Kligerman	Kyle Busch Motorsports	Toyota	Bandit Chippers
79	Jeffrey Earnhardt	Go Green Racing	Ford	Uponor
87	Joe Nemechek	NEMCO Motorsports	Toyota	AM/FM Energy Wood & Pellet Stoves
92	Dexter Stacey	KH Motorsports	Ford	Maddie's Place Rocks
99	Alex Bowman	RAB Racing	Toyota	St. Jude Children's Research Hospital
Official entry list

== Practice ==
The only practice session was held on Friday, June 14, at 1:10 PM EST, and would last for two hours and 15 minutes. Austin Dillon of Richard Childress Racing would set the fastest time in the session, with a lap of 37.738 and an average speed of 190.789 miles per hour (307.045 km/h).

Pos.	#	Driver	Team	Make	Time	Speed
1	3	Austin Dillon	Richard Childress Racing	Chevrolet	37.738	190.789
2	31	Justin Allgaier	Turner Scott Motorsports	Chevrolet	37.758	190.688
3	33	Paul Menard	Richard Childress Racing	Chevrolet	37.868	190.134
Full practice results

== Qualifying ==
Qualifying was held on Saturday, June 15, at 10:35 AM EST. Each driver would have two laps to set a fastest time; the fastest of the two would count as their official qualifying lap.

Austin Dillon of Richard Childress Racing would win the pole, setting a time of 37.523 and an average speed of 191.882 miles per hour (308.804 km/h).

No drivers would fail to qualify.

=== Full qualifying results ===
Pos.	#	Driver	Team	Make	Time	Speed
1	3	Austin Dillon	Richard Childress Racing	Chevrolet	37.523	191.882
2	33	Paul Menard	Richard Childress Racing	Chevrolet	37.762	190.668
3	2	Brian Scott	Richard Childress Racing	Chevrolet	37.831	190.320
4	6	Trevor Bayne	Roush Fenway Racing	Ford	37.833	190.310
5	99	Alex Bowman	RAB Racing	Toyota	37.849	190.230
6	5	Brad Sweet	JR Motorsports	Chevrolet	37.972	189.613
7	31	Justin Allgaier	Turner Scott Motorsports	Chevrolet	37.977	189.588
8	16	Chris Buescher	Roush Fenway Racing	Ford	37.997	189.489
9	20	Brian Vickers	Joe Gibbs Racing	Toyota	38.058	189.185
10	22	Joey Logano	Penske Racing	Ford	38.064	189.155
11	32	Kyle Larson	Turner Scott Motorsports	Chevrolet	38.075	189.100
12	60	Travis Pastrana	Roush Fenway Racing	Ford	38.076	189.095
13	12	Sam Hornish Jr.	Penske Racing	Ford	38.104	188.957
14	54	Kyle Busch	Joe Gibbs Racing	Toyota	38.123	188.862
15	70	Johanna Long	ML Motorsports	Chevrolet	38.129	188.833
16	77	Parker Kligerman	Kyle Busch Motorsports	Toyota	38.137	188.793
17	43	Michael Annett	Richard Petty Motorsports	Ford	38.138	188.788
18	79	Jeffrey Earnhardt	Go Green Racing	Ford	38.166	188.650
19	11	Elliott Sadler	Joe Gibbs Racing	Toyota	38.184	188.561
20	7	Regan Smith	JR Motorsports	Chevrolet	38.215	188.408
21	30	Nelson Piquet Jr.	Turner Scott Motorsports	Chevrolet	38.253	188.221
22	51	Jeremy Clements	Jeremy Clements Racing	Chevrolet	38.350	187.744
23	44	Cole Whitt	TriStar Motorsports	Toyota	38.522	186.906
24	40	Reed Sorenson	The Motorsports Group	Chevrolet	38.576	186.645
25	24	Blake Koch	SR² Motorsports	Toyota	38.676	186.162
26	10	Jeff Green	TriStar Motorsports	Toyota	38.732	185.893
27	87	Joe Nemechek	NEMCO Motorsports	Toyota	38.740	185.854
28	19	Mike Bliss	TriStar Motorsports	Toyota	38.794	185.596
29	4	Landon Cassill	JD Motorsports	Chevrolet	38.980	184.710
30	42	Josh Wise	The Motorsports Group	Chevrolet	39.040	184.426
31	01	Mike Wallace	JD Motorsports	Chevrolet	39.170	183.814
32	46	J. J. Yeley	The Motorsports Group	Chevrolet	39.279	183.304
33	92	Dexter Stacey	KH Motorsports	Ford	39.319	183.118
34	23	Scott Riggs	SR² Motorsports	Ford	39.386	182.806
35	00	Ken Butler III	SR² Motorsports	Toyota	39.905	180.429
36	52	Joey Gase	Jimmy Means Racing	Toyota	39.923	180.347
37	14	Eric McClure	TriStar Motorsports	Toyota	40.241	178.922
38	74	Juan Carlos Blum	Mike Harmon Racing	Chevrolet	40.699	176.909
39	15	Carl Long	Rick Ware Racing	Ford	40.855	176.233
Official starting lineup

== Race results ==
Fin	St	#	Driver	Team	Make	Laps	Led	Status	Pts	Winnings
1	20	7	Regan Smith	JR Motorsports	Chevrolet	125	14	running	47	$45,440
2	11	32	Kyle Larson	Turner Scott Motorsports	Chevrolet	125	0	running	42	$38,200
3	2	33	Paul Menard	Richard Childress Racing	Chevrolet	125	0	running	0	$24,750
4	14	54	Kyle Busch	Joe Gibbs Racing	Toyota	125	0	running	0	$17,800
5	4	6	Trevor Bayne	Roush Fenway Racing	Ford	125	0	running	39	$23,375
6	6	5	Brad Sweet	JR Motorsports	Chevrolet	125	0	running	38	$21,050
7	8	16	Chris Buescher	Roush Fenway Racing	Ford	125	0	running	37	$14,810
8	19	11	Elliott Sadler	Joe Gibbs Racing	Toyota	125	0	running	36	$21,645
9	21	30	Nelson Piquet Jr.	Turner Scott Motorsports	Chevrolet	125	0	running	35	$20,425
10	3	2	Brian Scott	Richard Childress Racing	Chevrolet	125	0	running	34	$21,875
11	10	22	Joey Logano	Penske Racing	Ford	125	30	running	0	$13,975
12	7	31	Justin Allgaier	Turner Scott Motorsports	Chevrolet	125	0	running	32	$19,800
13	22	51	Jeremy Clements	Jeremy Clements Racing	Chevrolet	124	0	running	31	$19,550
14	5	99	Alex Bowman	RAB Racing	Toyota	124	7	running	31	$19,675
15	23	44	Cole Whitt	TriStar Motorsports	Toyota	124	0	running	29	$20,275
16	31	01	Mike Wallace	JD Motorsports	Chevrolet	124	0	running	28	$19,375
17	12	60	Travis Pastrana	Roush Fenway Racing	Ford	124	0	running	27	$19,125
18	15	70	Johanna Long	ML Motorsports	Chevrolet	124	0	running	26	$19,075
19	17	43	Michael Annett	Richard Petty Motorsports	Ford	123	0	running	25	$19,025
20	1	3	Austin Dillon	Richard Childress Racing	Chevrolet	123	61	running	26	$28,550
21	28	19	Mike Bliss	TriStar Motorsports	Toyota	123	0	running	23	$18,900
22	25	24	Blake Koch	SR² Motorsports	Toyota	123	0	running	22	$18,850
23	34	23	Scott Riggs	SR² Motorsports	Ford	123	0	running	0	$18,800
24	24	40	Reed Sorenson	The Motorsports Group	Chevrolet	123	0	running	20	$18,750
25	16	77	Parker Kligerman	Kyle Busch Motorsports	Toyota	123	13	running	20	$19,175
26	29	4	Landon Cassill	JD Motorsports	Chevrolet	122	0	running	18	$18,625
27	36	52	Joey Gase	Jimmy Means Racing	Toyota	122	0	running	17	$12,575
28	37	14	Eric McClure	TriStar Motorsports	Toyota	120	0	running	16	$18,500
29	27	87	Joe Nemechek	NEMCO Motorsports	Toyota	119	0	running	15	$18,450
30	38	74	Juan Carlos Blum	Mike Harmon Racing	Chevrolet	119	0	running	14	$18,700
31	18	79	Jeffrey Earnhardt	Go Green Racing	Ford	85	0	running	13	$18,350
32	13	12	Sam Hornish Jr.	Penske Racing	Ford	81	0	engine	12	$18,305
33	9	20	Brian Vickers	Joe Gibbs Racing	Toyota	80	0	running	11	$18,260
34	35	00	Ken Butler III	SR² Motorsports	Toyota	21	0	ignition	10	$18,230
35	39	15	Carl Long	Rick Ware Racing	Ford	16	0	alternator	9	$12,196
36	26	10	Jeff Green	TriStar Motorsports	Toyota	14	0	vibration	8	$11,375
37	30	42	Josh Wise	The Motorsports Group	Chevrolet	10	0	electrical	7	$11,355
38	32	46	J. J. Yeley	The Motorsports Group	Chevrolet	8	0	handling	0	$11,316
39	33	92	Dexter Stacey	KH Motorsports	Ford	6	0	crash	5	$17,190
Official race results

Previous race: 2013 DuPont Pioneer 250	NASCAR Nationwide Series; 2013 season	Next race: 2013 Johnsonville Sausage 200
