= 2010 NASCAR Mini Stock Series =

Seasons
- ← 2009 2011 →

The 2010 NASCAR Mini Stock Series season was the second to be run under this name. It is the feeder division of the NASCAR Corona Series.

== Cars ==
The Nissan made his NASCAR debut in the 2010 NASCAR Mini Stock Series' season.

== Drivers ==
Team	Manufacturer	No	Race Driver	Rounds
Team GP	Mazda	13	Juan Carlos Blum	1–4
Team GP	Mazda	18	María Limón (R)	1–4

== Calendar ==
2010 venues

Race	Race Name	Track	Date	Time	
Race	Race Name	Track	Date	Local	UTC
1	Aguascalientes	Autódromo Internacional de Aguascalientes	March 21	11:05	17:05
2	Querétaro	Autódromo Querétaro	April 11	11:05	16:05
3	San Luis Potosí	(San Luis Potosí) Autódromo Potosino	May 2	11:05	16:05
4	Chiapas	Autódromo Chiapas	May 22	19:55	00:55
5	Mexico City	(Mexico City) Autódromo Hermanos Rodríguez	June 6	11:05	16:05
6	Puebla	(Puebla) Autódromo Miguel E. Abed	July 18	11:05	16:05
7	Guadalajara	(Jalisco) Trióvalo Bernardo Obregón	August 8	11:05	16:05
8	San Luis Potosí	(San Luis Potosí) Autódromo Potosino	September 5	11:05	16:05
9	Mexico City	(Mexico City) Autódromo Hermanos Rodríguez	September 19	11:05	16:05
10	Querétaro	Autódromo Querétaro	October 3	11:05	16:05
11	Puebla	(Puebla) Autódromo Miguel E. Abed	October 17	11:05	16:05
12	Chiapas	Autódromo Chiapas	October 31	10:30	16:30
13	Aguascalientes	Autódromo Internacional de Aguascalientes	November 21	11:05	16:05

Oval
Road Course

== Results ==
=== Races ===
No.	Race	Pole position	Most laps led	Winning driver	Winning manufacturer
1	Aguascalientes	Juan Carlos Blum	Juan Carlos Blum	Enrique Contreras III	
2	Querétaro	Héctor Félix	Rodrigo Peralta	Rodrigo Peralta	Nissan
3	San Luis Potosí	Héctor Félix	Juan Carlos Blum	Héctor Félix	
4	Tuxtla Gutiérrez	Rodrigo Peralta	Juan Carlos Blum	Rubén García, Jr.	Mazda
5	Mexico City	Rubén García, Jr.	Rubén García, Jr.	Rubén García, Jr.	Mazda
6	Puebla	Juan Carlos Blum (rainout)	Rubén García, Jr.	Rubén García, Jr.	Mazda
7	Guadalajara	Rodrigo Peralta	Rodrigo Peralta	Rodrigo Peralta	Nissan
8	San Luis Potosí	Rodrigo Peralta	Rodrigo Peralta	Juan Carlos Blum	Mazda
9	Mexico City	Juan Carlos Blum (rainout)	Rodrigo Peralta	Rodrigo Peralta	Nissan
10	Querétaro	Rubén García, Jr.	Rodrigo Peralta	Rodrigo Peralta	Nissan
11	Puebla	Rodrigo Peralta	Rodrigo Peralta	Rodrigo Peralta	Nissan
12	Tuxtla Gutiérrez	Juan Carlos Blum	Juan Carlos Blum	Juan Carlos Blum	Mazda
13	Aguascalientes	Juan Carlos Blum	Rodrigo Peralta	Rodrigo Peralta	Nissan

=== Standings ===
(key) Bold - Pole position awarded by time. Italics - Pole position set by final practice results or rainout. * – Most laps led.

Only the best 11 results counted for the championship.

Rank	Driver	AGS	QRO	SLP	TXG	MXC	PUE	GDL	SL2	MX2	QR2	PU2	TX2	AG2	Points
1	Rodrigo Peralta **(R)**		1*	3	**4**	3	2	**1***	**4***	1*	1*	**1***	6	1*	1910
2	Juan Carlos Blum	**2***	2	6*	3*	2	7	4	1	2	3	3	**1***	**3**	1885
3	Rubén García, Jr. **(R)**		5	2	1	**1***	1*	3	10	3	**2**	4	3	9	1840
4	Jorge Contreras, Jr. **(R)**		3		5	4	4	6	9	7	5	5	5	5	1659
5	Erik Mondragón	4	8	8		8	6		6	8	9	7	7	7	1613
6	Raúl Galván, Jr. **(R)**		7	4	7	5	3	9	7	6	6	6	4	11	1611
7	María Limón **(R)**		9	7	9	10	10	7	8	9	8				1124
8	Enrique Contreras III	1	12	2		9	8	5							917
9	Héctor Aguirre **(R)**								3	4	4	2		2	800
10	Alejandro Villasana, Jr.								5		10	8	8	4	697
11	Javier Razo **(R)**								2	5	2			8	642
12	Rodrigo Marbán	3	11	5	6										600
13	Héctor Félix **(R)**		**6**	**1**		11									460
14	César López **(R)**		4	10		6									444
15	Diego Moguel	5	10	9											427
16	Rodrigo Fernández							2			7				312
17	Julio Prieto						9	10							272
18	Felipe Rodríguez				8	12									269
19	Héctor González						5								155
20	Antonio Herrera													6	150
21	Diego Fortanel					7									146
22	Ignacio Fontes							8							142
23	Enrique Baca													10	134
24	Adolfo Anguiano							11							130
Rank	Driver	AGS	QRO	SLP	TXG	MXC	PUE	GDL	SL2	MX2	QR2	PU2	TX2	AG2	Points
	References														

== See also ==
- 2010 NASCAR Sprint Cup Series
- 2010 NASCAR Nationwide Series
- 2010 NASCAR Camping World Truck Series
- 2010 ARCA Racing Series
- 2010 NASCAR Whelen Modified Tour
- 2010 NASCAR Whelen Southern Modified Tour
- 2010 NASCAR Canadian Tire Series
- 2010 NASCAR Corona Series
