= 2011 NASCAR Stock V6 Series =

Seasons
- ← 2010 2012 →

2011 NASCAR Stock V6 Series was the support series for the NASCAR Corona Series. This season was the first with the name Stock V6. The season was raced only in ovals.

== Resume ==
The season began in the Autódromo Potosino. Rubén García, Jr., son of the driver Rubén García Novoa, won the first event. In the second race, Raúl Galván Jr. take the victory. Meanwhile, Rubén García, Jr. won the championship.

== Drivers ==
Team	Manufacturer	No.	Race Driver	Rounds
ANVI Motorsport		20	Edgar Mondragón	All
CEDVA Racing Team		55	Jorge Contreras, Sr.	1–2
CMS Racing Products		10	Jacobo Cosio	2
CMS Racing Products		11	Javier Fernández	1–2
CMS Racing Products		28	Felipe Rodríguez	1–2
CMS Racing Products		72	Marco Castañeda	1
CMS Racing Products			Enrique Contreras III	2
Comsel		17	Ricardo Cantú	1–2
Curiel Racing	Mazda	06	Hugo Curiel	1–2
Dynamics Motorsport		18	Oscar Torres, Jr.	1, 3–10
Dynamics Motorsport			Héctor Aguirre	2
HDI Seguros	Mazda	4	Rubén García, Jr.	All
Rullops	Mazda	22	Raúl Galván, Jr.	All
UMAP Racing Team		77	Abel Arroyo	1–2
	Nissan	27	Ricado Peralta	1

== 2011 calendar ==
No.	Race title	Track	Date	Time
1	San Luis Potosí	(San Luis Potosí) Autódromo Potosino, Villa de Zaragoza	3 April	11:25
2	Aguascalientes	Autódromo Internacional de Aguascalientes, Aguascalientes	1 May	11:25
3	Querétaro	Autódromo Querétaro, Santiago de Querétaro	5 June	11:10
4	Puebla	Autódromo Miguel E. Abed, Puebla	19 June	
5	Ciudad de México	Autódromo Hermanos Rodríguez, Mexico City	17 July	
6	San Luis Potosí	(San Luis Potosí) Autódromo Potosino, Villa de Zaragoza	7 August	
7	Querétaro	Autódromo Querétaro, Santiago de Querétaro	4 September	
8	Puebla	Autódromo Miguel E. Abed, Puebla	2 October	
9	Aguascalientes	Autódromo Internacional de Aguascalientes, Aguascalientes	6 November	
10	Mexico Fest 200	Autódromo Hermanos Rodríguez, Mexico City	27 November	

== Results ==
=== Races ===
No.	Race	Pole position	Most laps led	Winning driver	Winning manufacturer
1	San Luis Potosí	Rubén García, Jr.	Rubén García, Jr.	Rubén García, Jr.	Mazda
2	Aguascalientes	Rubén García, Jr.	Héctor Aguirre	Raúl Galván, Jr.	Mazda
3	Querétaro	Héctor Aguirre	Héctor Aguirre	Héctor Aguirre	
4	Puebla	Héctor Aguirre	Rubén García, Jr.	Rubén García, Jr.	Mazda
5	Mexico City	Héctor Aguirre	Rubén García, Jr.	Rubén García, Jr.	Mazda
6	San Luis Potosí	Rubén García, Jr.	Rubén García, Jr.	Rubén García, Jr.	Mazda
7	Querétaro	Rubén Galván	Rubén García, Jr.	Rubén García, Jr.	Mazda
8	Puebla	Rubén García, Jr.	Rubén García, Jr.	Rubén García, Jr.	Mazda
9	Aguascalientes	Tony Garza		Rubén García, Jr.	Mazda
10	Mexico City	Rubén García, Jr.	Rubén García, Jr.	Oscar Torres, Jr.	

=== Standings ===
(key) Bold - Pole position awarded by time. Italics - Pole position set by final practice results or rainout. * – Most laps led.

Rank	Driver	SLP	AGS	QRO	PUE	MXC	SL2	QR2	PU2	AG2	MX2	Points
1	Rubén García, Jr.	**1***	**3**	2	1*	1*	1*	**1***	**1***	1	**2***	1820
2	Raúl Galván, Jr.	2	1	3	10	11	5	2	8	5	5	1576
3	Edgar Mondragón	5	7	7	6	6	4	7	10	8	8	1467
4	Oscar Torres, Jr. **(R)**	6		4	3	5	**9**	13	2	9	1	1395
5	Ricardo Hernández **(R)**	12	11	10	8	8		9	5	7	9	1248
6	Jorge Contreras, Sr.	4	9		5	4	7					1244
7	Juan C. Buitrón **(R)**	15		11	7	7	8		6	10	11	1093
8	Ricardo Cantú **(R)**	8	6	5	4	12	10	12				995
9	Héctor González **(R)**					13	6	8	9	11	7	826
10	Javier Campos							5	7	3	3	801
11	Tony Garza						11	4	4	**2**	13	749
12	Héctor Aguirre **(R)**		2*	**1***	**2**	**2**	3					715
13	Jorge Contreras, Jr.							3	3	6	4	640
14	Ricardo Peralta **(R)**	11		9	9	10						540
15	Felipe Rodríguez **(R)**	14	5	6								426
16	Hugo Curiel **(R)**	9	10	8								414
17	Luis C. Ramírez **(R)**					14		6			10	401
18	Rodrigo Echeverría					3	2					340
19	Javier Fernández	13	4									284
20	Abel Arroyo **(R)**	10	8									276
21	Rodrigo Marbán					9		10				272
22	Valdemar Treviño **(R)**							14			6	271
23	Marco Castañeda **(R)**	7									14	267
24	Jacobo Cosio **(R)**		12		11							257
25	Roberto Fernández	3										165
26	César Pedrero									4		160
27	Pepe Rivera, Jr. **(R)**							11				130
28	Pepe González								11			130
29	Rafael Vallina									12		127
30	Ernesto Guerrero										12	127
31	Enrique Contreras III		13									124
Rank	Driver	SLP	AGS	QRO	PUE	MXC	SL2	QR2	PU2	AG2	MX2	Points
	References											

== See also ==
- 2011 NASCAR Sprint Cup Series
- 2011 NASCAR Nationwide Series
- 2011 NASCAR Camping World Truck Series
- 2011 ARCA Racing Series
- 2011 NASCAR Whelen Modified Tour
- 2011 NASCAR Whelen Southern Modified Tour
- 2011 NASCAR Canadian Tire Series
- 2011 NASCAR Corona Series
