= 2013 Johnsonville Sausage 200 =

14th race of the 2013 NASCAR Nationwide Series

2013 Johnsonville Sausage 200 presented by Menards
Race details
- Race 14 of 33 of the 2013 NASCAR Nationwide Series
- The 2013 Johnsonville Sausage 200 program cover.
- Date: June 22, 2013
- Official name: 4th Annual Johnsonville Sausage 200 presented by Menards
- Location: Elkhart Lake, Wisconsin, Road America
- Course: Permanent racing facility
- Course length: 4.048 miles (6.515 km)
- Distance: 55 laps, 222.64 mi (356.224 km)
- Scheduled distance: 50 laps, 202.4 mi (325.731 km)
- Average speed: 74.697 miles per hour (120.213 km/h)

Pole position
Driver	A. J. Allmendinger	Penske Racing
- Time: 2:13.410

Most laps led
Driver	A. J. Allmendinger	Penske Racing
- Laps: 29

Winner
No. 22	A. J. Allmendinger	Penske Racing

Television in the United States
- Network: ESPN
- Announcers: Allen Bestwick, Rusty Wallace, Andy Petree

Radio in the United States
- Radio: Motor Racing Network

The 2013 Johnsonville Sausage 200 presented by Menards was the 14th stock car race of the 2013 NASCAR Nationwide Series and the fourth iteration of the event. The race was held on Saturday, June 22, 2013, in Elkhart Lake, Wisconsin at Road America, a 4.048 miles (6.515 km) permanent road course. The race was extended from its scheduled 50 laps to 55 due to multiple green–white–checker finishes. At race's end, A. J. Allmendinger, driving for Penske Racing, would hold off the field on the final restart to complete a dominant performance and earn his first career NASCAR Nationwide Series win and his first win of the season. To fill out the podium, Justin Allgaier of Turner Scott Motorsports and Parker Kligerman of Kyle Busch Motorsports would finish second and third, respectively.

== Background ==
The layout of Road America, the venue where the race was held.

Road America is a motorsport road course located near Elkhart Lake, Wisconsin on Wisconsin Highway 67. It has hosted races since the 1950s and currently hosts races in the NASCAR Xfinity Series, NTT Indycar Series, NTT WeatherTech SportsCar Championship, SCCA Pirelli World Challenge, ASRA, AMA Superbike series, IndyCar Series, and SCCA Pro Racing's Trans-Am Series.

=== Entry list ===
#	Driver	Team	Make	Sponsor
00	Blake Koch*	SR² Motorsports	Toyota	
01	Mike Wallace	JD Motorsports	Chevrolet	G&K Services
2	Brian Scott	Richard Childress Racing	Chevrolet	Charter Communications
3	Austin Dillon	Richard Childress Racing	Chevrolet	AdvoCare
4	Landon Cassill	JD Motorsports	Chevrolet	Flex Seal
5	Johnny O'Connell	JR Motorsports	Chevrolet	Keen Parts
6	Trevor Bayne	Roush Fenway Racing	Ford	Valvoline NextGen
7	Regan Smith	JR Motorsports	Chevrolet	TaxSlayer
10	Jeff Green	TriStar Motorsports	Toyota	TriStar Motorsports
11	Elliott Sadler	Joe Gibbs Racing	Toyota	OneMain Financial
12	Sam Hornish Jr.	Penske Racing	Ford	Snap-on
14	Eric McClure	TriStar Motorsports	Toyota	Hefty, Reynolds Wrap
15	Carl Long*	Rick Ware Racing	Ford	Lilly Trucking
16	Billy Johnson	Roush Fenway Racing	Ford	Ford EcoBoost
18	Michael McDowell	Joe Gibbs Racing	Toyota	K-Love
19	Mike Bliss	TriStar Motorsports	Toyota	TriStar Motorsports
20	Brian Vickers	Joe Gibbs Racing	Toyota	Dollar General
21	Brendan Gaughan	Richard Childress Racing	Chevrolet	South Point Hotel, Casino & Spa
22	A. J. Allmendinger	Penske Racing	Ford	Discount Tire
23	Stanton Barrett	Rick Ware Racing	Ford	FAIR Girls
24	Derek White	SR² Motorsports	Toyota	VIP Poker
26	John Young	Young Racing	Dodge	Contract Metal Products
30	Nelson Piquet Jr.	Turner Scott Motorsports	Chevrolet	Qualcomm
31	Justin Allgaier	Turner Scott Motorsports	Chevrolet	Brandt Professional Agriculture
32	Kyle Larson	Turner Scott Motorsports	Chevrolet	Cottonelle
33	Max Papis	Richard Childress Racing	Chevrolet	Menards, Rheem
34	James Buescher	Turner Scott Motorsports	Chevrolet	Wolfpack Energy Services
40	Reed Sorenson	The Motorsports Group	Chevrolet	Swisher E-Cigarette
42	T. J. Bell*	The Motorsports Group	Chevrolet	The Motorsports Group
43	Michael Annett	Richard Petty Motorsports	Ford	Pilot Flying J
44	Cole Whitt	TriStar Motorsports	Toyota	CBC Framing
51	Jeremy Clements	Jeremy Clements Racing	Chevrolet	Jeremy Clements Racing
52	Joey Gase*	Jimmy Means Racing	Toyota	Jimmy Means Racing
53	Andrew Ranger	NDS Motorsports	Dodge	Waste Management Bagster
54	Owen Kelly	Joe Gibbs Racing	Toyota	Monster Energy
60	Travis Pastrana	Roush Fenway Racing	Ford	Roush Fenway Racing
70	Tony Raines	ML Motorsports	Toyota	ML Motorsports
74	Kevin O'Connell	Mike Harmon Racing	Chevrolet	Mike Harmon Racing
75	Kenny Habul	SunEnergy1 Racing	Toyota	Schneider Electric
77	Parker Kligerman	Kyle Busch Motorsports	Toyota	Toyota
79	Jeffrey Earnhardt	Go Green Racing	Ford	Oath Keepers "We The People"
87	Kyle Kelley	NEMCO Motorsports	Chevrolet	First Class Auto Body, Jameson Engineering
89	Morgan Shepherd*	Shepherd Racing Ventures	Chevrolet	Racing with Jesus
92	Dexter Stacey	KH Motorsports	Ford	Maddie's Place Rocks
99	Alex Bowman	RAB Racing	Toyota	RAB Racing
Official entry list

*Withdrew.

== Practice ==
=== First practice ===
The first practice session was held on Friday, June 21, at 11:30 AM CST, and would last for an hour and 30 minutes. Sam Hornish Jr. of Penske Racing would set the fastest time in the session, with a lap of 2:26.888 and an average speed of 99.210 miles per hour (159.663 km/h).

Pos.	#	Driver	Team	Make	Time	Speed
1	12	Sam Hornish Jr.	Penske Racing	Ford	2:26.888	99.210
2	40	Reed Sorenson	The Motorsports Group	Chevrolet	2:27.042	99.106
3	44	Cole Whitt	TriStar Motorsports	Toyota	2:27.125	99.051
Full first practice results

=== Second and final practice ===
The second and final practice session, sometimes referred to as Happy Hour, was held on Friday, June 21, at 1:30 PM CST, and would last for an hour and 25 minutes. Owen Kelly of Joe Gibbs Racing would set the fastest time in the session, with a lap of 2:14.038 and an average speed of 108.721 miles per hour (174.969 km/h).

Pos.	#	Driver	Team	Make	Time	Speed
1	54	Owen Kelly	Joe Gibbs Racing	Toyota	2:14.038	108.721
2	16	Billy Johnson	Roush Fenway Racing	Ford	2:14.583	108.281
3	22	A. J. Allmendinger	Penske Racing	Ford	2:14.636	108.239
Full Happy Hour practice results

== Qualifying ==
Qualifying was held on Saturday, June 22, at 11:05 AM CST. Each driver would have one lap to set a time.

A. J. Allmendinger of Penske Racing would win the pole, setting a time of 2:13.410 and an average speed of 109.233 miles per hour (175.793 km/h).

No drivers would fail to qualify.

=== Full qualifying results ===
Pos.	#	Driver	Team	Make	Time	Speed
1	22	A. J. Allmendinger	Penske Racing	Ford	2:13.410	109.233
2	54	Owen Kelly	Joe Gibbs Racing	Toyota	2:13.641	109.044
3	77	Parker Kligerman	Kyle Busch Motorsports	Toyota	2:13.761	108.947
4	31	Justin Allgaier	Turner Scott Motorsports	Chevrolet	2:13.910	108.825
5	18	Michael McDowell	Joe Gibbs Racing	Toyota	2:14.006	108.747
6	30	Nelson Piquet Jr.	Turner Scott Motorsports	Chevrolet	2:14.242	108.556
7	16	Billy Johnson	Roush Fenway Racing	Ford	2:14.308	108.503
8	12	Sam Hornish Jr.	Penske Racing	Ford	2:14.348	108.471
9	20	Brian Vickers	Joe Gibbs Racing	Toyota	2:14.348	108.471
10	33	Max Papis	Richard Childress Racing	Chevrolet	2:14.664	108.216
11	6	Trevor Bayne	Roush Fenway Racing	Ford	2:14.807	108.101
12	5	Johnny O'Connell	JR Motorsports	Chevrolet	2:14.880	108.043
13	32	Kyle Larson	Turner Scott Motorsports	Chevrolet	2:14.917	108.013
14	3	Austin Dillon	Richard Childress Racing	Chevrolet	2:15.053	107.904
15	99	Alex Bowman	RAB Racing	Toyota	2:15.133	107.840
16	7	Regan Smith	JR Motorsports	Chevrolet	2:15.588	107.479
17	44	Cole Whitt	TriStar Motorsports	Toyota	2:15.608	107.463
18	2	Brian Scott	Richard Childress Racing	Chevrolet	2:15.679	107.406
19	60	Travis Pastrana	Roush Fenway Racing	Ford	2:15.743	107.356
20	43	Michael Annett	Richard Petty Motorsports	Ford	2:15.996	107.156
21	53	Andrew Ranger	NDS Motorsports	Dodge	2:16.018	107.139
22	11	Elliott Sadler	Joe Gibbs Racing	Toyota	2:17.029	106.348
23	19	Mike Bliss	TriStar Motorsports	Toyota	2:17.142	106.261
24	51	Jeremy Clements	Jeremy Clements Racing	Chevrolet	2:17.313	106.128
25	23	Stanton Barrett	Rick Ware Racing	Ford	2:17.490	105.992
26	21	Brendan Gaughan	Richard Childress Racing	Chevrolet	2:17.561	105.937
27	87	Kyle Kelley	NEMCO Motorsports	Chevrolet	2:17.612	105.898
28	75	Kenny Habul	SunEnergy1 Racing	Toyota	2:17.924	105.658
29	34	James Buescher	Turner Scott Motorsports	Chevrolet	2:18.181	105.462
30	4	Landon Cassill	JD Motorsports	Chevrolet	2:18.243	105.414
31	01	Mike Wallace	JD Motorsports	Chevrolet	2:18.342	105.339
32	79	Jeffrey Earnhardt	Go Green Racing	Ford	2:18.969	104.864
33	40	Reed Sorenson	The Motorsports Group	Chevrolet	2:19.024	104.822
34	26	John Young	Young Racing	Dodge	2:19.065	104.791
35	14	Eric McClure	TriStar Motorsports	Toyota	2:19.082	104.778
36	10	Jeff Green	TriStar Motorsports	Toyota	2:20.059	104.048
37	74	Kevin O'Connell	Mike Harmon Racing	Chevrolet	2:21.082	103.293
38	24	Derek White	SR² Motorsports	Toyota	2:21.609	102.909
Qualified by owner's points
39	70	Tony Raines	ML Motorsports	Toyota	2:25.412	100.217
Last car to qualify on time
40	92	Dexter Stacey	KH Motorsports	Ford	2:25.206	100.359
Withdrew
WD	00	Blake Koch	SR² Motorsports	Toyota	—	—
WD	15	Carl Long	Rick Ware Racing	Ford	—	—
WD	42	T. J. Bell	The Motorsports Group	Chevrolet	—	—
WD	52	Joey Gase	Jimmy Means Racing	Chevrolet	—	—
WD	89	Morgan Shepherd	Shepherd Racing Ventures	Chevrolet	—	—
Official starting lineup

== Race results ==
Fin	St	#	Driver	Team	Make	Laps	Led	Status	Pts	Winnings
1	1	22	A. J. Allmendinger	Penske Racing	Ford	55	29	running	0	$59,325
2	4	31	Justin Allgaier	Turner Scott Motorsports	Chevrolet	55	1	running	43	$43,225
3	3	77	Parker Kligerman	Kyle Busch Motorsports	Toyota	55	4	running	42	$33,925
4	2	54	Owen Kelly	Joe Gibbs Racing	Toyota	55	8	running	41	$28,275
5	8	12	Sam Hornish Jr.	Penske Racing	Ford	55	2	running	40	$23,775
6	9	20	Brian Vickers	Joe Gibbs Racing	Toyota	55	0	running	38	$23,425
7	13	32	Kyle Larson	Turner Scott Motorsports	Chevrolet	55	0	running	37	$21,825
8	17	44	Cole Whitt	TriStar Motorsports	Toyota	55	0	running	36	$20,100
9	22	11	Elliott Sadler	Joe Gibbs Racing	Toyota	55	0	running	35	$20,825
10	14	3	Austin Dillon	Richard Childress Racing	Chevrolet	55	0	running	34	$20,775
11	26	21	Brendan Gaughan	Richard Childress Racing	Chevrolet	55	0	running	0	$13,475
12	12	5	Johnny O'Connell	JR Motorsports	Chevrolet	55	0	running	32	$19,400
13	31	01	Mike Wallace	JD Motorsports	Chevrolet	55	0	running	31	$19,300
14	29	34	James Buescher	Turner Scott Motorsports	Chevrolet	55	1	running	0	$13,175
15	7	16	Billy Johnson	Roush Fenway Racing	Ford	55	10	running	30	$18,575
16	19	60	Travis Pastrana	Roush Fenway Racing	Ford	55	0	running	28	$19,025
17	10	33	Max Papis	Richard Childress Racing	Chevrolet	55	0	running	27	$18,925
18	28	75	Kenny Habul	SunEnergy1 Racing	Toyota	55	0	running	26	$12,825
19	25	23	Stanton Barrett	Rick Ware Racing	Ford	55	0	running	25	$18,750
20	18	2	Brian Scott	Richard Childress Racing	Chevrolet	55	0	running	24	$19,375
21	6	30	Nelson Piquet Jr.	Turner Scott Motorsports	Chevrolet	55	0	running	23	$18,625
22	37	74	Kevin O'Connell	Mike Harmon Racing	Chevrolet	55	0	running	22	$18,585
23	24	51	Jeremy Clements	Jeremy Clements Racing	Chevrolet	55	0	running	21	$18,550
24	15	99	Alex Bowman	RAB Racing	Toyota	55	0	running	20	$18,490
25	40	92	Dexter Stacey	KH Motorsports	Ford	55	0	running	19	$12,895
26	32	79	Jeffrey Earnhardt	Go Green Racing	Ford	55	0	running	18	$18,385
27	35	14	Eric McClure	TriStar Motorsports	Toyota	55	0	running	17	$18,350
28	34	26	John Young	Young Racing	Dodge	55	0	running	16	$12,320
29	21	53	Andrew Ranger	NDS Motorsports	Dodge	55	0	running	0	$12,285
30	11	6	Trevor Bayne	Roush Fenway Racing	Ford	55	0	running	14	$18,540
31	27	87	Kyle Kelley	NEMCO Motorsports	Chevrolet	54	0	running	13	$18,195
32	16	7	Regan Smith	JR Motorsports	Chevrolet	54	0	running	12	$18,150
33	23	19	Mike Bliss	TriStar Motorsports	Toyota	53	0	overheating	11	$18,120
34	5	18	Michael McDowell	Joe Gibbs Racing	Toyota	52	0	running	0	$18,100
35	20	43	Michael Annett	Richard Petty Motorsports	Ford	50	0	crash	9	$18,068
36	38	24	Derek White	SR² Motorsports	Toyota	37	0	oil leak	8	$17,255
37	33	40	Reed Sorenson	The Motorsports Group	Chevrolet	31	0	chassis	7	$17,235
38	39	70	Tony Raines	ML Motorsports	Toyota	20	0	rear gear	6	$11,216
39	30	4	Landon Cassill	JD Motorsports	Chevrolet	7	0	engine	5	$11,075
40	36	10	Jeff Green	TriStar Motorsports	Toyota	2	0	brakes	4	$10,975
Withdrew
WD		00	Blake Koch	SR² Motorsports	Toyota					
WD		15	Carl Long	Rick Ware Racing	Ford					
WD		42	T. J. Bell	The Motorsports Group	Chevrolet					
WD		52	Joey Gase	Jimmy Means Racing	Chevrolet					
WD		89	Morgan Shepherd	Shepherd Racing Ventures	Chevrolet					
Official race results

Previous race: 2013 Alliance Truck Parts 250	NASCAR Nationwide Series; 2013 season	Next race: 2013 Feed the Children 300
