= Trevor Bayne =

American racing driver (born 1991)

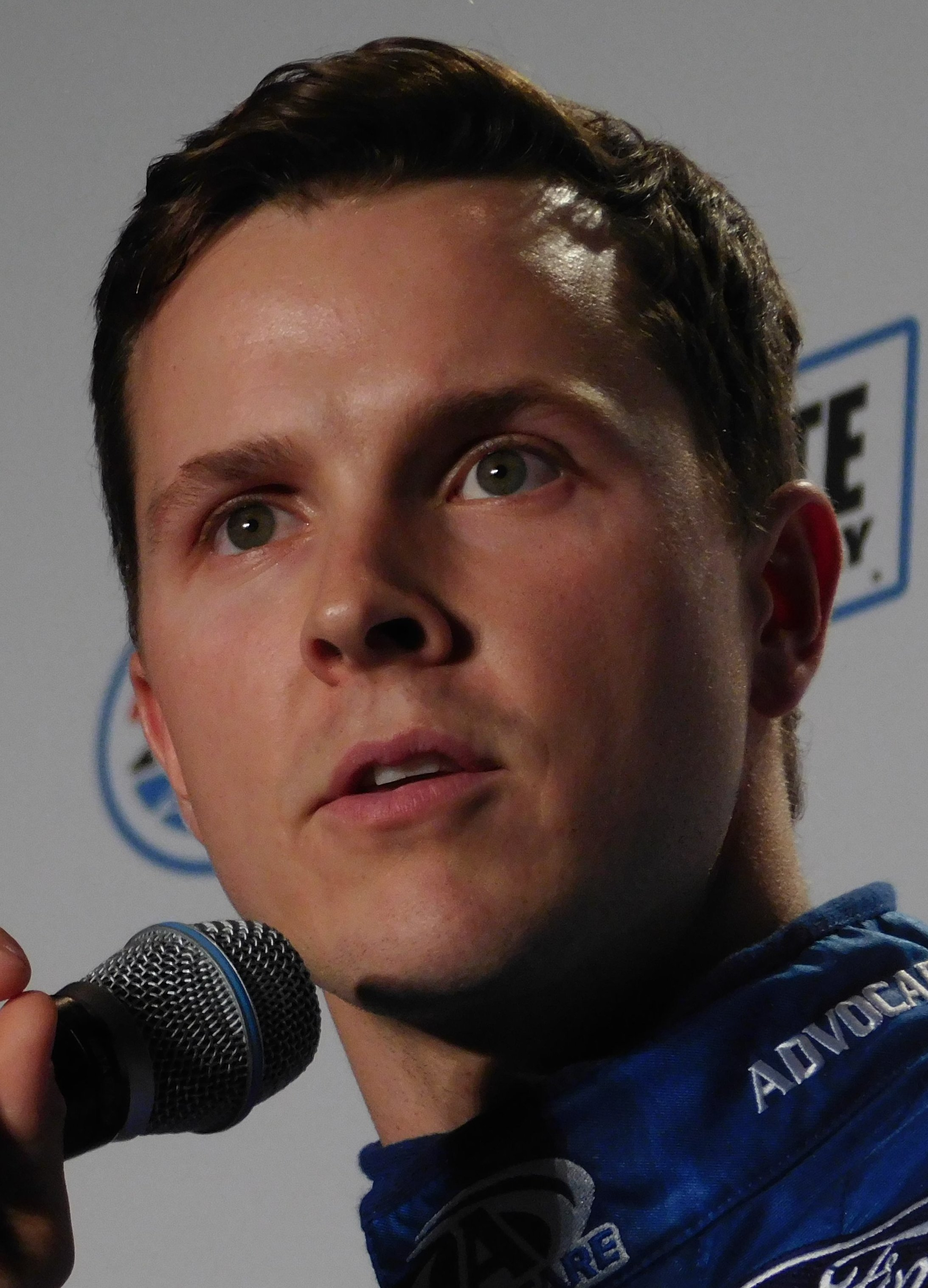
- Bayne during the 2017 NASCAR Media Tour
- Born: Trevor Mitchell Bayne; February 19, 1991 (age 35); Knoxville, Tennessee, U.S.
- Height: 6 ft 2 in (1.88 m)
- Weight: 175 lb (79 kg)
- Achievements: 2011 Daytona 500 Winner (youngest ever, 20 years & 1 day); 2005 Allison Legacy Series Champion

NASCAR Cup Series career
- 187 races run over 9 years
- 2018 position: 31st
- Best finish: 22nd (2016, 2017)
- First race: 2010 AAA Texas 500 (Texas)
- Last race: 2018 AAA Texas 500 (Texas)
- First win: 2011 Daytona 500 (Daytona)
Wins	Top tens	Poles
1	16	0

NASCAR O'Reilly Auto Parts Series career
- 165 races run over 10 years
- 2025 position: 96th
- Best finish: 6th (2013, 2014)
- First race: 2009 Scotts Turf Builder 300 (Bristol)
- Last race: 2025 Focused Health 302 (Las Vegas)
- First win: 2011 O'Reilly Auto Parts Challenge (Texas)
- Last win: 2013 DuPont Pioneer 250 (Iowa)
Wins	Top tens	Poles
2	81	9

NASCAR FedEx Freight Truck Series career
- 10 races run over 3 years
- 2025 position: 45th
- Best finish: 35th (2020)
- First race: 2020 South Carolina Education Lottery 200 (Darlington)
- Last race: 2025 Sober or Slammer 200 (Darlington)
Wins	Top tens	Poles
0	3	0

ARCA Menards Series career
- 1 race run over 1 year
- Best finish: 85th (2015)
- First race: 2015 Pocono ARCA 200 (Pocono)
- First win: 2015 Pocono ARCA 200 (Pocono)
Wins	Top tens	Poles
1	1	1

ARCA Menards Series East career
- 15 races run over 3 years
- Best finish: 4th (2008)
- First race: 2007 Mansfield 150 (Mansfield)
- Last race: 2009 Tri-County 150 (Tri-County)
- First win: 2008 Pepsi Full Fender Frenzy 100 (Thompson)
Wins	Top tens	Poles
1	9	2

ARCA Menards Series West career
- 1 race run over 1 year
- Best finish: 49th (2015)
- First race: 2015 Carneros 200 (Sonoma)
Wins	Top tens	Poles
0	1	0
- Statistics up to date as of November 2, 2025.

Trevor Mitchell Bayne (born February 19, 1991) is an American semi-retired professional stock car racing driver, dirt racing driver, team owner, and businessman. He last competed part-time in the NASCAR Xfinity Series, competing in the No. 24 Toyota GR Supra for Sam Hunt Racing, and part-time in the NASCAR Craftsman Truck Series, driving the No. 1 Toyota Tundra TRD Pro for Tricon Garage. He is also a pit reporter for NASCAR on Prime Video. He is the youngest person to ever win the Daytona 500, the largest event in NASCAR, doing so a day after his twentieth birthday in 2011. The win came in only his second race in NASCAR's top series, and was his only victory in 187 total Cup Series starts.

After losing his ride with Roush in 2018, Bayne opened Mahalo Coffee Roasters in Knoxville, Tennessee, as well as starting in 2021 driving a 602 Crate Late Model on a part-time basis for his own team that he shares with his younger brother Trey Bayne in the American Crate All-Star Series presented by PPM. At the end of 2022, he sold Mahalo Coffee Roasters as he was on the verge of signing a full-time deal with Joe Gibbs Racing in the NASCAR Xfinity Series in 2023 (which did not end up happening).

== Racing career ==
=== Beginnings ===
Bayne was born in Knoxville, Tennessee in February 1991. He began racing go-karts at the age of five. He continued to race go-karts for eight years, during which he recorded more than 300 feature wins and eighteen total State and Track Championships.

In 2003, Bayne moved to Allison Legacy Series, where he became the youngest top rookie. The next year, he became the series' National Champion, the youngest person ever to win the title. During the two years he raced in the series, he won fourteen races, earned nineteen pole positions, and recorded thirty top-five finishes in only 41 starts. In 2005, when Bayne was fifteen years old, he moved to the USAR Hooters Pro Cup Series Southern Division, in which he received the highest rookie honors. In 2008, he signed a contract with Dale Earnhardt, Inc. under their driver development program, racing in the NASCAR Camping World East Series, where he recorded one win, six top-fives, and seven top-ten finishes and finished fourth in point standings. One year later, he recorded Sunoco Rookie of the Race honors after participating in the Toyota All-Star Showdown at Irwindale Speedway. Also in 2009, he began racing in the Nationwide Series for Michael Waltrip Racing. After about two years with the team, he moved to Roush Fenway Racing at the end of the season and began racing in the Sprint Cup Series for Wood Brothers Racing.

=== Xfinity Series ===
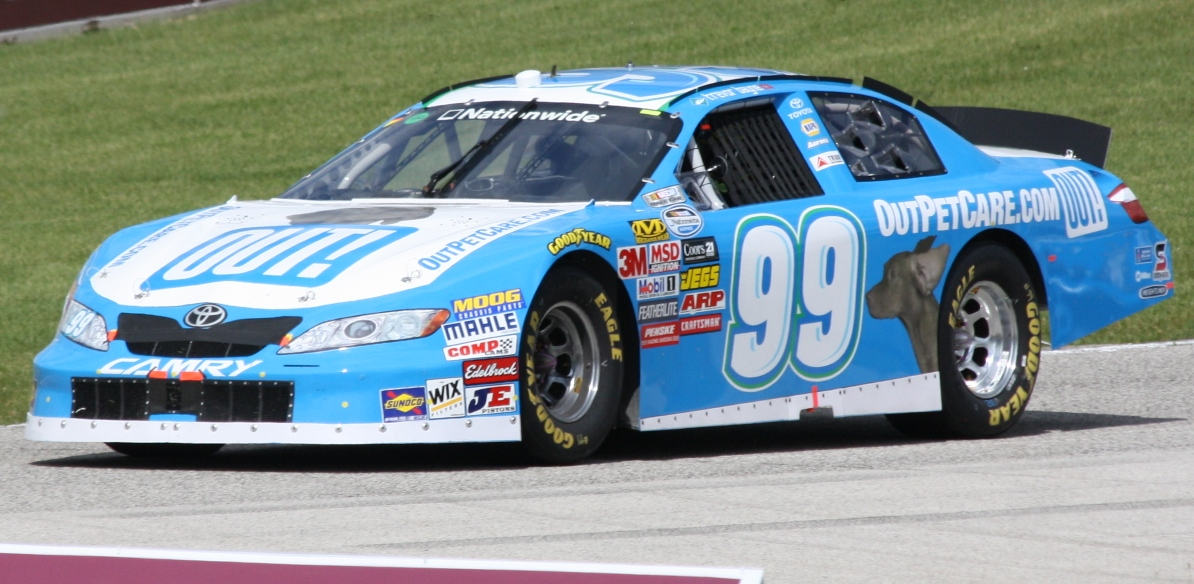
2010 Xfinity car

==== 2009–2010: Entry into the Xfinity Series ====
After DEI merged into Chip Ganassi Racing's shop following 2008, Bayne was hired as a development driver by Ganassi. However, as Ganassi had shut down its Nationwide Series program after 2008, Bayne made his first Xfinity Series start in 2009 at Bristol Motor Speedway driving a Ganassi car carrying the No. 52 of Means Racing. Bayne finished in the 23rd position. He then signed a contract with Michael Waltrip Racing for a limited race schedule. In his first start for the team in the Federated Auto Parts 300 at Nashville Superspeedway, he qualified second and finished 28th. He got the pole position at the Kroger 200 at Indianapolis Raceway Park and finished seventh at that race and the Virginia 529 College Savings 250 at Richmond.

During the 2010 season, Bayne drove the No. 99 Out Pet Care Toyota Camry for Diamond-Waltrip Racing in 28 races before moving to Roush Fenway Racing. While with Michael Waltrip Racing in 2010, he recorded three pole positions, five top-fives, and nine top-ten finishes. After announcing his departure from MWR in 2010, he was released and replaced with the Truex brothers Ryan Truex and Martin Truex Jr.

==== 2010–2014: Roush Fenway Racing ====
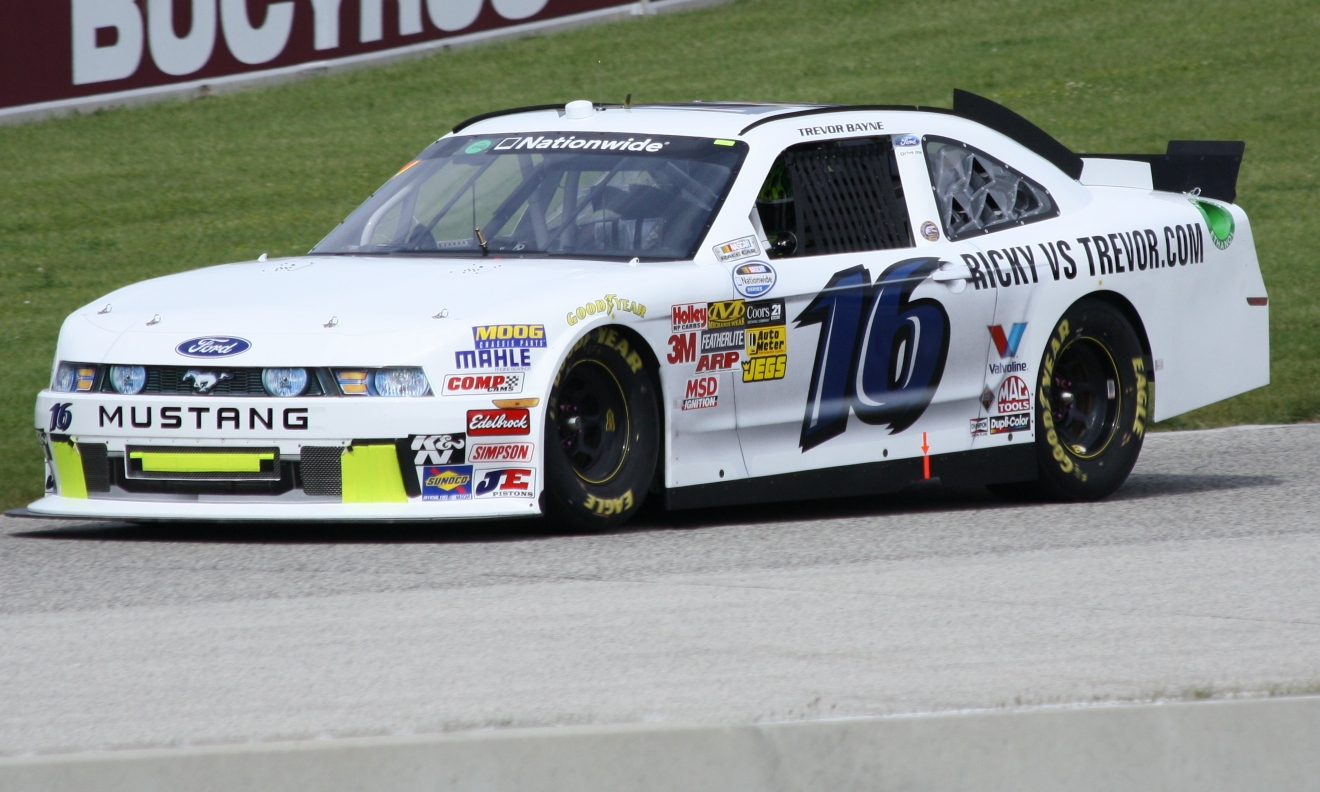
Racing for Roush Fenway in 2011

In October 2010, Bayne signed a multi-year contract with Roush Fenway Racing. For the rest of 2010, Bayne drove the No. 17 Ford in the Nationwide Series. Over the complete 2010 season, Bayne ended up recording three pole positions, six top-five, and eleven top-ten finishes, and finishing seventh in the final point standings.

For the 2011 season, Roush moved him to the No. 16 Nationwide Series car. He then went on medical leave for much of the spring. After recovering from his illness, Bayne made his return to racing at the STP 300 at Chicagoland Speedway on June 4, 2011, finishing third. He won his first Xfinity Series race at the Texas Motor Speedway on November 5, 2011, by edging out Denny Hamlin on a late-race restart. Despite only competing in 29 of the 34 races, Bayne finished eleventh in points, recorded five top-five finishes, and fourteen top-ten finishes to go along with his Texas win.

For 2012, Bayne was moved by Roush to the No. 60 Ford in the Nationwide Series; however, a lack of sponsorship sidelined the team after the first five races. Bayne came back to run one more race later in the season.

In 2013, Bayne replaced Ricky Stenhouse Jr. in the No. 6 Nationwide Series car, with Stenhouse moving up to the Sprint Cup Series full-time. On June 9, Bayne got his second career Xfinity Series victory by winning the DuPont Pioneer 250 at Iowa Speedway after Austin Dillon's handling went away.

Bayne returned to the No. 6 and RFR for the 2014 season. Advocare, previously a sponsor in the Cup Series and primary sponsor of Austin Dillon the prior two years, came on to sponsor the full season.

Bayne came close to many wins in the spring of 2014. He almost won at Dover and was edged by Kyle Busch for the win. In an interview, he said "My team's improved significantly. This series is so tough this year, and we've been on our game. But you want to be greedy and ask for more." He finished second again at Chicago after leading a few laps. He then took home $200,000 in the Dash-4-Cash program at the Iowa race and split it between him and a randomly chosen fan.

==== 2022–2023: Return To The Xfinity Series ====
On February 9, 2022, Joe Gibbs Racing announced that they had signed Bayne to drive the No. 18 in seven races. Bayne raced at Fontana, Phoenix in April, Charlotte in May, Nashville, Loudon, Vegas in October, and at Homestead. Bayne finished third in his first race of seven at Fontana. At Phoenix, he finished 4th. At Charlotte, he finished 9th. At Nashville, Bayne finished second and second again at Loudon, Bayne wouldn't race again until October, when Joe Gibbs added an extra race to his schedule, as the originally scheduled driver of the No. 18 for the weekend Drew Dollar, backed out to focus on college, Bayne finished thirteenth as he got shuffled back on the final laps. Bayne finished fifth at Las Vegas and sixth at Homestead, his final race of the season.

On August 23, 2023, Bayne announced that he would return to Joe Gibbs Racing for three races, driving the No. 19 Toyota Supra at Daytona, Bristol and Texas. He would finish 29th after being collected in a big wreck at Daytona. At Bristol, he would finish seventh after a good run. At Texas, he was involved in another wreck, which caused him to finish 33rd.

==== 2025: Sam Hunt Racing ====
In September 2025, it was announced Bayne would return to the Xfinity Series at Las Vegas Motor Speedway, driving the No. 24 for Sam Hunt Racing.

=== NASCAR Cup Series ===
==== 2010–2014: Wood Brothers Racing ====
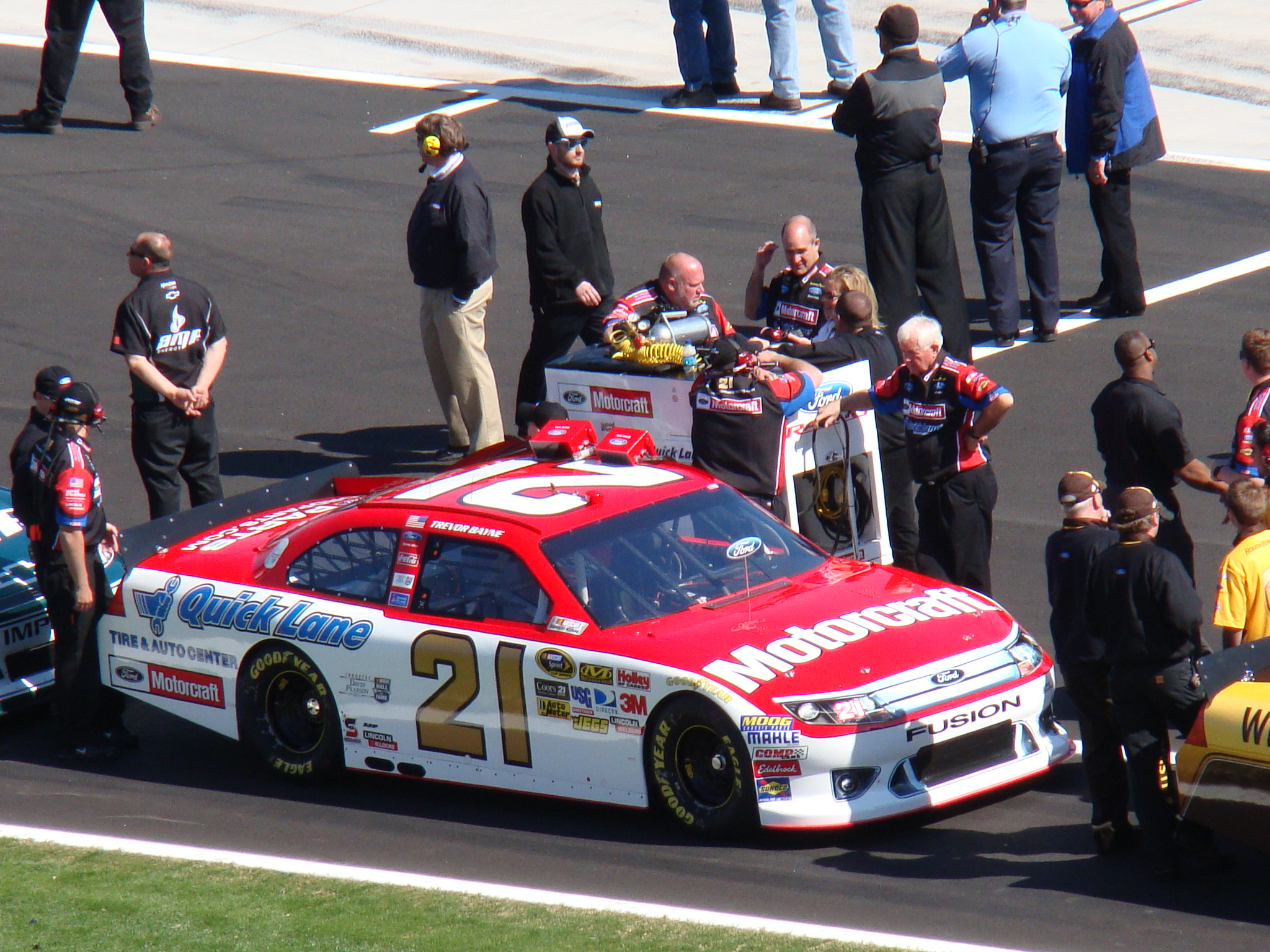
Bayne's 2011 Daytona 500 winning car

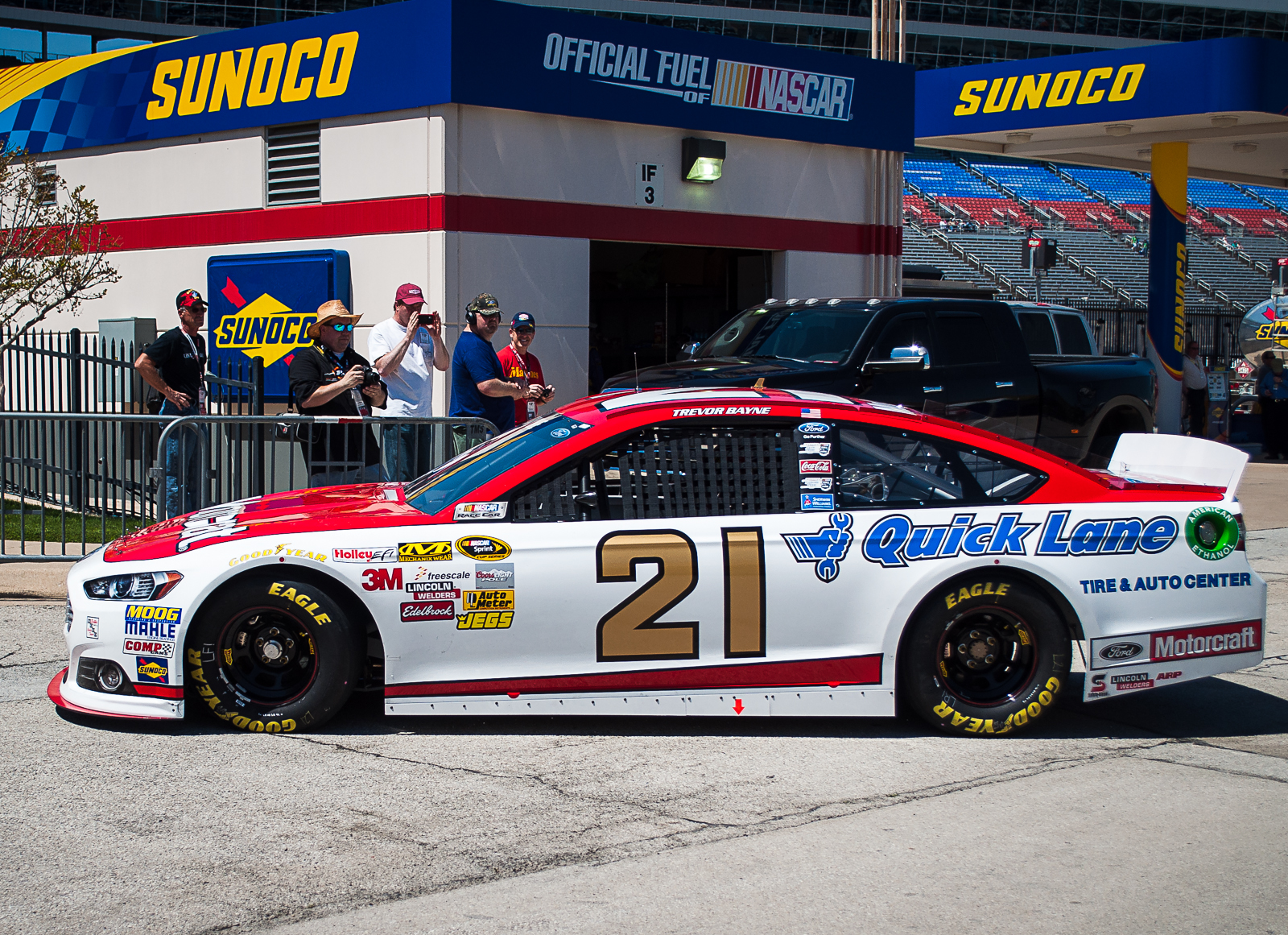
Bayne's 2013 Cup car at Texas Motor Speedway

Bayne moved to the 2010 Sprint Cup Series and raced for the Wood Brothers Racing team in the Texas 500, starting 28th and finishing seventeenth. He returned to the Wood Brothers in 2011 for a limited schedule. He won the first race of the season, the Daytona 500, to become the youngest winner in Daytona 500 history, at the age of 20 years and one day. This was the Wood Brothers' first win since the 2001 season when Elliott Sadler won at Bristol. Despite the big win, Bayne finished 40th the next week at Phoenix. The Daytona 500 win also granted Bayne eligibility for the NASCAR Sprint All-Star Race in 2011 and 2012. However, the Wood Brothers originally didn't have the sponsorship to run the non-points event or Talladega. The team later announced that Bayne would run the All-Star as well as the spring Talladega race with sponsorship from Camping World and Good Sam Club. After the Samsung Mobile 500, Bayne was hospitalized for a spider bite but was released that Wednesday. Bayne raced at Talladega, but was caught up in an early crash. However, Bayne's illness returned after racing at Nashville Superspeedway and he was hospitalized for five weeks, with his Nationwide ride being taken over by Chris Buescher, Kevin Swindell, and Matt Kenseth. Bayne's Cup Series ride for the Coca-Cola 600 was driven by Roush Fenway teammate Ricky Stenhouse Jr. The illness was originally thought to be Lyme disease, but later that same year it was announced that Bayne had been diagnosed with multiple sclerosis. Bayne would return to the seat of the No. 16 and would win his first Nationwide race in Texas. For 2012, 2013, and 2014, Bayne returned to the No. 21 for a limited schedule.

==== 2015–2018: Roush Fenway Racing ====
On May 24, 2014, RFR announced that Bayne would be running the No. 6 full-time in the Sprint Cup Series for the 2015 season. Near the end of the 2014 season, Bayne intended to run the No. 6 Advocare Cup car in a few races to get a head-start on his 2015 campaign. However, the plan was aborted after he failed to qualify in his first race at Charlotte in October. Bayne was not eligible to run for Rookie of the Year consideration, having spent four years running in several races.

Bayne qualified fifteenth in a controversial qualifying session for the Daytona 500. However, a crash during the first Budweiser Duel forced Bayne to a backup car. He got collected in a late-race accident involving Jeff Gordon, Reed Sorenson, Ricky Stenhouse Jr., and A. J. Allmendinger, but nonetheless finished the race on the lead lap.

After bad performances throughout the spring, Bayne had a good run going at the GEICO 500. While running third, he lost control of his car and triggered a massive crash. In an interview following, he would blame dirty air for causing him to lose control and causing the crash. At Dover on May 31, 2015, Bayne got into an accident involving Justin Allgaier and Michael Annett. After the race, Bayne was called to the Oval Office and fined $20,000 for violating a race procedure made in the wake of the Kevin Ward Jr. accident in August 2014, in which a driver must remain in their car until being permitted by officials to exit (unless fire or smoke engulf the car).

Bayne got his first top-ten of the year at Michigan, during the rain-delayed Quicken Loans 400. After an early speeding penalty, it looked like Bayne was set to finish a lap down. However, because several cars stayed out for the final yellow while the race leaders pitted, Bayne got his lap back, and when the race was later called because of rain showers, Bayne had finished ninth and got his first top ten since the 2012 Aaron’s 499. He picked up his first ARCA win at Pocono after starting first and dominating the race, and recorded another Cup Series top ten in the 2015 Coke Zero 400. Bayne's struggles would continue, as he would finish fortieth in back-to-back races at Indianapolis and Pocono, being plagued by a major lack of speed at both tracks.

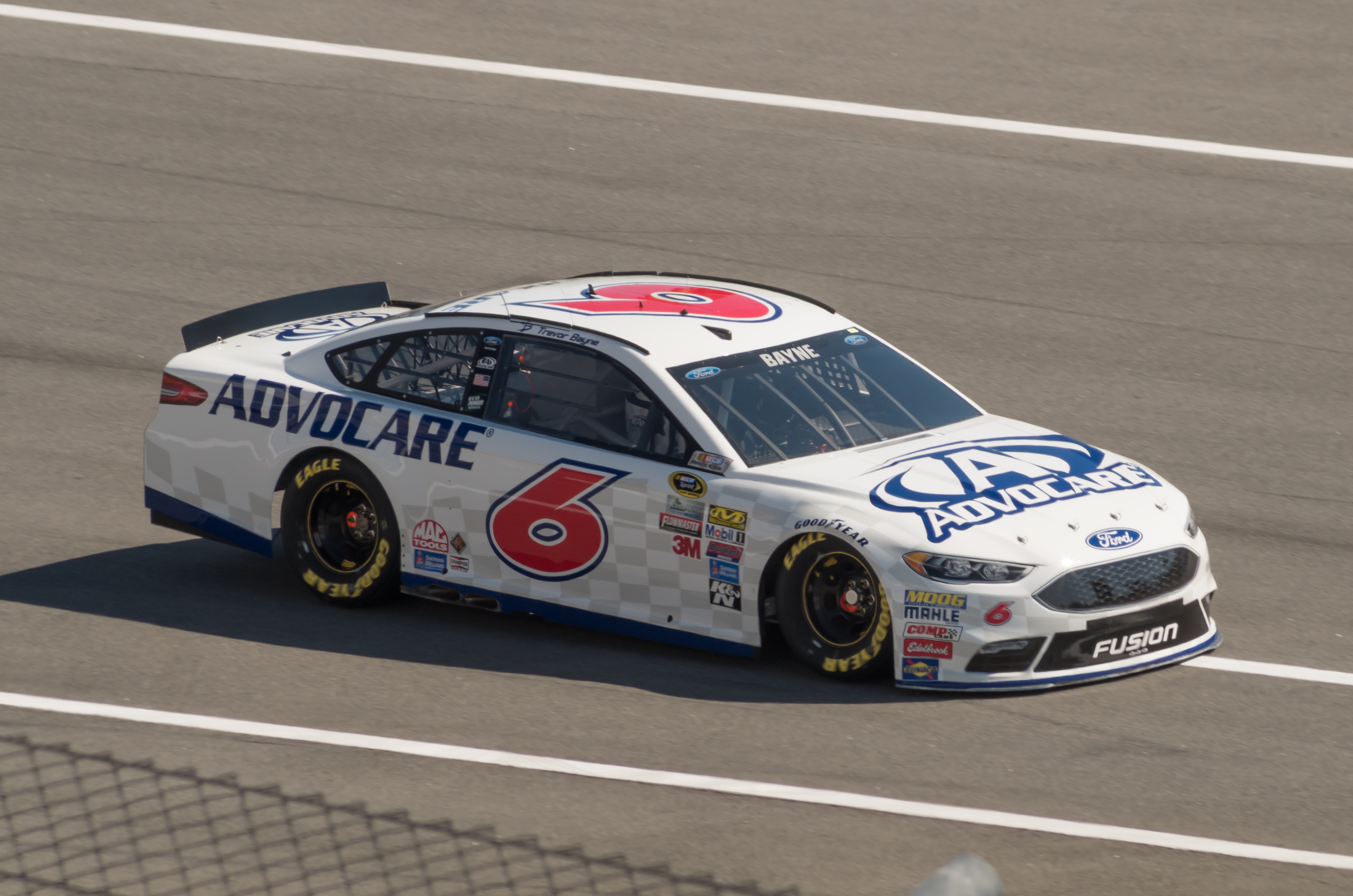
Bayne's No. 6 car at Daytona International Speedway in 2016

To start off 2016, Bayne would finish 28th in the Daytona 500. The next week at Atlanta, Bayne surprised many fans by qualifying fourth but finished 22nd. In the following weeks, he finished seventeenth at Las Vegas, 23rd at Phoenix, twentieth at Auto Club Speedway, 27th at Martinsville, fifteenth at Texas (after a fuel mileage gamble), and then a fifth-place finish at Bristol (getting his first top-five of the year). The next week at Richmond, he would finish seventeenth. The next week at Talladega, Bayne would have yet another strong race, as he would lead several laps and finish tenth. The next week at Kansas, he qualified 10th but ended up blowing a tire and finished 25th. The next week at Dover, his strong races would continue, when he finished tenth. The following week at Pocono, Bayne finished in 25th place. The next week at Michigan, he finished in 13th place. The next week at Sonoma, Bayne finished in fifteenth place. The next week at Daytona, Bayne scored his third career top-five finish with a third-place outing. The next week at Kentucky, it would come down to a fuel mileage race, and Bayne would conserve enough fuel to finish eleventh. The next week at New Hampshire, Bayne would finish 23rd. The next week at Indianapolis, Bayne would be involved in a wreck with Clint Bowyer on a green-white-checkered attempt and finish 30th.

It was announced on November 30, 2016, that Liberty National Insurance would become a sponsor for Bayne and the No. 6 car.

In February 2017, Bayne picked up his first top-ten finish of the season at the 2017 Daytona 500. He ran as high as third and finished tenth. At the 2017 Brickyard 400, Bayne had a fantastic race that ultimately was his nearest miss of his entire career. Thanks to a strategy call by Matt Puccia, Bayne moved up in the standings to fourth and was in a position to take the lead from Brad Keselowski when Keselowski, Kasey Kahne, and Jimmie Johnson pitted. His strategy was first thwarted by a caution that came out as soon as he took the lead, and after slipping in the standings from a pit stop, he found himself running fourth again. Bayne was about to take the lead on a restart, but got collected in an accident involving him, Ryan Blaney, Joey Logano, and a few other cars. In a post-race interview, Bayne said, "I've never been more upset after a loss in my entire racing career. I say every week we give it all we have and we do it for God's glory and trust him with the results, whether they're good or bad. It's hard to understand, but it hurts." Fellow driver Denny Hamlin blamed Bayne for the restart, though it showed that it was not Bayne's fault, and later said to his crew, "He can't wait till his sponsorship money runs out".

Later in the year, Bayne got two top-fives at Michigan and Bristol and was running as high as second with two laps to go at Michigan until he got loose in the corner and fell to 5th. At Talladega in the fall, he miraculously finished third after his car was damaged from a couple of late race accidents and pushed by six drivers on the last lap, and nearly beat Ryan Newman for second. He got another top-ten running at Martinsville by passing a few cars on the last lap and finishing sixth, sideways across the line from a multi-car last lap crash.

Bayne finished 22nd in points for the second year in a row while breaking a new record for most top-fives and top-tens in a year, with two and six, respectively. Liberty National would leave the team for Richard Childress Racing at the end of the year.

On April 14, 2018, SB Nation reported that former RFR driver Matt Kenseth would return to the team for select races in the No. 6, starting at Kansas in May, effectively demoting Bayne to part-time status for the remainder of the season. It marked Bayne's first part-time season since 2014.

After a long summer of poor finishes, it was announced on September 12, 2018, that Bayne would not return to the No. 6 Ford Mustang in 2019, making him a free agent.

==== 2019: Free agent ====
After departing Roush Fenway Racing at the end of 2018, Bayne and his family returned home to Tennessee. During the 2019 offseason, Bayne constructed a farm in the state's countryside. In late June, the Bayne family opened the Mahalo Coffee Roasters store in Knoxville. Bayne later revealed that he had offers to drive, but did not have the sponsorship money necessary for any of them.

=== Craftsman Truck Series ===
==== 2020: Niece Motorsports ====
On August 31, 2020, Niece Motorsports announced Bayne would make his Truck Series debut in the team's No. 40 Silverado at Darlington. He would make his second consecutive start in the series for Niece at Richmond, replacing full-time driver Ty Majeski in the No. 45, as Majeski was out for undisclosed reasons. Bayne finished fifth at Bristol, but was disqualified when his truck failed the minimum height requirement during post-race inspection. At Talladega, he finished second after being beaten for the win by Raphaël Lessard as the caution came out on the final lap. After the race, he affirmed he would run the No. 45 for the rest of the 2020 season.

==== 2023: Rackley W.A.R. ====
On October 17, 2023, it was announced Bayne would drive Rackley W.A.R.'s No. 25 at Homestead–Miami Speedway. He would finish the race in fourteenth.

==== 2025: Tricon Garage ====
In August 2025, it was announced Bayne would drive the No. 1 for Tricon Garage at Darlington Raceway. In his first NASCAR national series race in nearly two years, Bayne scored a top-five result in fifth.

== Personal life ==
Bayne is an outspoken Christian. He has credited his faith for helping him handle both the overnight success he experienced by winning the Daytona 500 as well as the health scare that took him away from racing briefly during the 2011 season. He has been on several mission trips to Mexico with Back2Back Ministries, including one in December 2011. Bayne also attended Passion 2012 at the Georgia Dome and was recognized for his faith in front of approximately 45,000 college students during the final session of the conference.

On November 12, 2013, Bayne announced that he had been diagnosed with multiple sclerosis.

In December 2012, Bayne announced his engagement to Ashton Clapp. The couple was married on June 4, 2013, and had their first child, Elizabeth Kate in December 2015. Their son, Levi Jensen Bayne, was born on June 20, 2017. They welcomed their third child, a son named Luka, on September 19, 2019. On December 11, 2021, their fourth child, a son named Jude, was born. On September 14, 2023, their fifth child, which was a son named Jett, was welcomed.

The Baynes opened Mahalo Coffee Roasters, a coffeehouse chain in Knoxville, Tennessee, in 2019. At the end of 2022, he sold Mahalo Coffee Roasters as he was on the verge of signing a full-time deal with Joe Gibbs Racing in the NASCAR Xfinity Series in 2023 (which did not end up happening).

Bayne is the older brother and team owner of American Crate All-Star Series presented by PPM driver Trey Bayne, who shares the car with Trevor himself.

== Motorsports career results ==
=== Racing career summary ===
Season	Series	Team	Races	Wins	Top 5	Top 10	Points	Position
2007	NASCAR Busch East Series	Rocky Bayne	1	0	0	0	104	65th
2008	NASCAR Camping World East Series	Dale Earnhardt, Inc.	13	1	6	8	1855	4th
2009	NASCAR Camping World East Series	Dave Davis	1	0	0	1	150	50th
2009	NASCAR Nationwide Series	Earnhardt Ganassi Racing	1	0	0	0	1648	32nd
2009	NASCAR Nationwide Series	Michael Waltrip Racing	12	0	0	1	1648	32nd
2009	NASCAR Nationwide Series	CJM Racing	2	0	0	1	1648	32nd
2010	NASCAR Nationwide Series	Diamond-Waltrip Racing	28	0	5	10	4041	7th
2010	NASCAR Nationwide Series	Roush Fenway Racing	7	0	1	1	4041	7th
2010	NASCAR Sprint Cup Series	Wood Brothers Racing	1	0	0	0	112	66th
2011	NASCAR Nationwide Series	Roush Fenway Racing	29	1	5	14	893	11th
2011	NASCAR Sprint Cup Series	Wood Brothers Racing	17	1	1	1	0	NC†
2012	NASCAR Nationwide Series	Roush Fenway Racing	6	0	1	3	308	32nd
2012	NASCAR Sprint Cup Series	Wood Brothers Racing	16	0	0	2	0	NC†
2013	NASCAR Nationwide Series	Roush Fenway Racing	33	1	7	21	1086	6th
2013	NASCAR Sprint Cup Series	Wood Brothers Racing	12	0	0	0	0	NC†
2014	NASCAR Nationwide Series	Roush Fenway Racing	33	0	5	21	1086	6th
2014	NASCAR Sprint Cup Series	Roush Fenway Racing	0	0	0	0	0	NC†
2014	NASCAR Sprint Cup Series	Wood Brothers Racing	12	0	0	0	0	NC†
2015	NASCAR K&N Pro Series West	Bill McAnally Racing	1	0	0	1	34	49th
2015	ARCA Racing Series	Cunningham Motorsports	1	1	1	1	245	85th
2015	NASCAR Sprint Cup Series	Roush Fenway Racing	36	0	0	2	655	29th
2016	NASCAR Xfinity Series	Roush Fenway Racing	1	0	1	1	0	NC†
2016	NASCAR Sprint Cup Series	Roush Fenway Racing	36	0	2	5	762	22nd
2017	Monster Energy NASCAR Cup Series	Roush Fenway Racing	36	0	2	6	660	22nd
2018	Monster Energy NASCAR Cup Series	Roush Fenway Racing	21	0	0	0	287	31st
2020	NASCAR Gander Outdoors Truck Series	Niece Motorsports	8	0	1	2	138	35th
2022	NASCAR Xfinity Series	Joe Gibbs Racing	9	0	5	7	357	23rd
2023	NASCAR Craftsman Truck Series	Rackley W.A.R.	1	0	0	0	0	NC†
2023	NASCAR Xfinity Series	Joe Gibbs Racing	3	0	0	1	72	43rd
2025	NASCAR Craftsman Truck Series	TRICON Garage	1	0	1	1	34	45th
2025	NASCAR Xfinity Series	Sam Hunt Racing	1	0	0	0	0	NC†

^{†} As Bayne was a guest driver, he was ineligible for championship points.

=== NASCAR ===
(key) (Bold – Pole position awarded by qualifying time. Italics – Pole position earned by points standings or practice time. * – Most laps led.)

==== Monster Energy Cup Series ====
Monster Energy NASCAR Cup Series results
Year	Team	No.	Make	1	2	3	4	5	6	7	8	9	10	11	12	13	14	15	16	17	18	19	20	21	22	23	24	25	26	27	28	29	30	31	32	33	34	35	36	MENCC	Pts	Ref
2010	Wood Brothers Racing	21	Ford	DAY	CAL	LVS	ATL	BRI	MAR	PHO	TEX	TAL	RCH	DAR	DOV	CLT	POC	MCH	SON	NHA	DAY	CHI	IND	POC	GLN	MCH	BRI	ATL	RCH	NHA	DOV	KAN	CAL	CLT	MAR	TAL	TEX; 17	PHO	HOM	66th	112	
2011	Wood Brothers Racing	21	Ford	DAY; 1	PHO; 40	LVS; 20	BRI; 34	CAL; 30	MAR; 35	TEX; 17	TAL; 40	RCH	DAR	DOV	CLT	KAN	POC	MCH; 16	SON	DAY; 41	KEN	NHA	IND; 30	POC	GLN	MCH; 24	BRI	ATL	RCH	CHI; 23	NHA	DOV	KAN	CLT; 31	TAL; 15	MAR	TEX; 17	PHO	HOM; 25	53rd	0^{1}	
2012	Wood Brothers Racing	21	Ford	DAY; 35	PHO	LVS; 9	BRI	CAL	MAR	TEX; 28	KAN	RCH	TAL; 8	DAR	CLT; 24	DOV	POC	MCH; 43	SON	KEN	DAY; 27	NHA	IND; 17	POC	GLN	MCH; 24	BRI	ATL; 16	RCH	CHI; 20	NHA	DOV	TAL; 21	CLT; 22	KAN; 21	MAR	TEX; 22	PHO	HOM; 23	59th	0^{1}	
2013	Wood Brothers Racing	21	Ford	DAY; 27	PHO	LVS; 23	BRI	CAL	MAR	TEX; 18	KAN	RCH	TAL; 43	DAR	CLT; 16	DOV	POC	MCH; 15	SON	KEN	DAY; 20	NHA	IND; 28	POC	GLN	MCH; 21	BRI	ATL	RCH	CHI	NHA	DOV	KAN	CLT	TAL; 23	MAR	TEX; 29	PHO	HOM; 40	56th	0^{1}	
2014	Wood Brothers Racing	21	Ford	DAY; 33	PHO	LVS; 20	BRI	CAL	MAR	TEX; 19	DAR	RCH	TAL; 41	KAN	CLT; 20	DOV	POC	MCH; 19	SON	KEN	DAY; 38	NHA	IND; 43	POC	GLN	MCH; 41	BRI	ATL	RCH	CHI	NHA	DOV	KAN		TAL; 32	MAR	TEX; 39	PHO	HOM; 42	58th	0^{1}	
2014	Roush Fenway Racing	6	Ford																															CLT; DNQ						58th	0^{1}	
2015	Roush Fenway Racing	6	Ford	DAY; 30	ATL; 19	LVS; 28	PHO; 28	CAL; 29	MAR; 18	TEX; 18	BRI; 28	RCH; 24	TAL; 41	KAN; 31	CLT; 27	DOV; 43	POC; 24	MCH; 9	SON; 23	DAY; 9	KEN; 13	NHA; 32	IND; 40	POC; 40	GLN; 22	MCH; 22	BRI; 15	DAR; 35	RCH; 23	CHI; 28	NHA; 16	DOV; 31	CLT; 22	KAN; 18	TAL; 21	MAR; 31	TEX; 39	PHO; 34	HOM; 18	29th	655	
2016	Roush Fenway Racing	6	Ford	DAY; 28	ATL; 22	LVS; 17	PHO; 23	CAL; 20	MAR; 27	TEX; 15	BRI; 5	RCH; 17	TAL; 10	KAN; 25	DOV; 10	CLT; 25	POC; 13	MCH; 15	SON; 25	DAY; 3	KEN; 11	NHA; 23	IND; 30	POC; 19	GLN; 9	BRI; 12	MCH; 25	DAR; 40	RCH; 14	CHI; 23	NHA; 38	DOV; 20	CLT; 18	KAN; 17	TAL; 17	MAR; 23	TEX; 30	PHO; 28	HOM; 20	22nd	762	
2017	Roush Fenway Racing	6	Ford	DAY; 10	ATL; 12	LVS; 13	PHO; 19	CAL; 23	MAR; 13	TEX; 13	BRI; 11	RCH; 13	TAL; 37	KAN; 10	CLT; 16	DOV; 21	POC; 21	MCH; 17	SON; 27	DAY; 23	KEN; 37	NHA; 20	IND; 20	POC; 20	GLN; 35	MCH; 5	BRI; 7	DAR; 35	RCH; 25	CHI; 22	NHA; 24	DOV; 24	CLT; 14	TAL; 3	KAN; 20	MAR; 6	TEX; 28	PHO; 38	HOM; 19	22nd	660	
2018	Roush Fenway Racing	6	Ford	DAY; 13	ATL; 35	LVS; 20	PHO; 20	CAL; 37	MAR; 33	TEX; 12	BRI; 24	RCH; 21	TAL; 38	DOV; 19	KAN	CLT	POC	MCH	SON; 27	CHI; 26	DAY; 20	KEN	NHA	POC	GLN	MCH; 34	BRI; 11	DAR	IND	LVS; 13	RCH	ROV; 35	DOV	TAL; 13	KAN; 30	MAR	TEX; 21	PHO	HOM	31st	287	

===== Daytona 500 =====
Year	Team	Manufacturer	Start	Finish
2011	Wood Brothers Racing	Ford	32	**1**
2012	Wood Brothers Racing	Ford	40	35
2013	Wood Brothers Racing	Ford	33	27
2014	Wood Brothers Racing	Ford	14	33
2015	Roush Fenway Racing	Ford	37	30
2016	Roush Fenway Racing	Ford	23	28
2017	Roush Fenway Racing	Ford	11	10
2018	Roush Fenway Racing	Ford	18	13

==== Xfinity Series ====
NASCAR Xfinity Series results
Year	Team	No.	Make	1	2	3	4	5	6	7	8	9	10	11	12	13	14	15	16	17	18	19	20	21	22	23	24	25	26	27	28	29	30	31	32	33	34	35	NXSC	Pts	Ref
2009	Earnhardt Ganassi Racing	52	Chevy	DAY	CAL	LVS	BRI; 23	TEX	NSH	PHO	TAL	RCH	DAR	CLT	DOV																								32nd	1648	
2009	Michael Waltrip Racing	99	Toyota													NSH; 28	KEN; 12	MLW; 12	NHA	DAY	CHI; 12	GTW; 27	**IRP**; 7	IOW; 26	GLN	MCH; 30	BRI; 24	CGV	ATL; 26						MEM; QL^{†}	TEX; 13	PHO; 14	HOM	32nd	1648	
2009	CJM Racing	11	Toyota																											RCH; 7	DOV	KAN	CAL; 19	CLT					32nd	1648	
2010	Diamond-Waltrip Racing	99	Toyota	DAY; 41	CAL; 11	LVS; 6	BRI; 30	NSH; 12	PHO; 32	TEX; 14	TAL; 13	RCH; 21	DAR; 16	DOV; 29	CLT; 17	NSH; 32	KEN; 11	ROA; 10	NHA; 5	DAY; 27	CHI; 32	**GTW**; 3	**IRP**; 4	**IOW**; 5	GLN; 29	MCH; 11	BRI; 6	CGV; 10	ATL; 24	RCH; 3	DOV; 6								7th	4041	
2010	Roush Fenway Racing	17	Ford																													KAN; 30	CAL; 11	CLT; 17		TEX; 12	PHO; 14	HOM; 5	7th	4041	
2010	Roush Fenway Racing	16	Ford																																GTW; 11				7th	4041	
2011	Roush Fenway Racing	16	Ford	DAY; 10	PHO; 31	LVS; 5	BRI; 19	CAL; 6	TEX; 13	TAL; 6	NSH; 6	RCH	DAR	DOV	IOW	CLT	CHI; 3	MCH; 5	ROA; 31	DAY; 22	KEN; 11	NHA; 13	NSH; 9	IRP; 28	IOW; 25	GLN; 9	CGV; 23	BRI; 13	ATL; 33	RCH; 28	CHI; 11	DOV; 6	KAN; 9	CLT; 3	TEX; 1	PHO; 6	HOM; 11		11th	893	
2012	Roush Fenway Racing	60	Ford	DAY; 11	PHO; 7	LVS; 4	BRI; 8	CAL; 14	TEX	RCH	TAL	DAR	IOW	CLT	DOV	MCH	ROA	KEN	DAY	NHA	CHI	IND	IOW	GLN	CGV	**BRI**; 16	ATL	RCH	CHI	KEN	DOV	CLT	KAN	TEX	PHO	HOM			32nd	308	
2013	Roush Fenway Racing	6	Ford	**DAY**; 31	PHO; 4	LVS; 4	BRI; 12	CAL; 9	TEX; 26	RCH; 12	TAL; 28	DAR; 32	CLT; 6	DOV; 4	IOW; 1	MCH; 5	ROA; 30	KEN; 12	DAY; 10	NHA; 7	CHI; 7	IND; 16	IOW; 10	GLN; 10	MOH; 9	BRI; 6	ATL; 6	RCH; 5	CHI; 15	KEN; 15	DOV; 9	KAN; 9	CLT; 8	TEX; 11	PHO; 7	HOM; 5			6th	1086	
2014	Roush Fenway Racing	6	Ford	DAY; 3	PHO; 7	LVS; 8	BRI; 8	CAL; 9	TEX; 23	DAR; 9	RCH; 11	TAL; 10	IOW; 9	CLT; 8	DOV; 2	MCH; 30	ROA; 27	KEN; 15	DAY; 9	NHA; 9	CHI; 2	IND; 9	**IOW**; 3	GLN; 13	MOH; 9	BRI; 13	ATL; 12	RCH; 15	CHI; 5	KEN; 15	DOV; 9	KAN; 8	CLT; 7	TEX; 36	PHO; 9	HOM; 11			6th	1086	
2016	Roush Fenway Racing	60	Ford	DAY	ATL	LVS	PHO	CAL	TEX	BRI	RCH	TAL	DOV	CLT	POC	MCH	IOW	DAY	KEN	NHA	IND	IOW	GLN; 5	MOH	BRI	ROA	DAR	RCH	CHI	KEN	DOV	CLT	KAN	TEX	PHO	HOM			102nd	0^{1}	
2022	Joe Gibbs Racing	18	Toyota	DAY	CAL; 3	LVS	**PHO**; 4	ATL; 28	COA	RCH	MAR	TAL	DOV	DAR	TEX	CLT; 9	PIR	NSH; 2	ROA	ATL	NHA; 2	POC	IRC	MCH	GLN	DAY	DAR	KAN	BRI	TEX	TAL; 13	ROV	LVS; 5	**HOM**; 6	MAR	PHO			23rd	357	
2023	Joe Gibbs Racing	19	Toyota	DAY	CAL	LVS	PHO	ATL	COA	RCH	MAR	TAL	DOV	DAR	CLT	PIR	SON	NSH	CSC	ATL	NHA	POC	ROA	MCH	IRC	GLN	DAY; 29	DAR	KAN	BRI; 7	TEX; 33	ROV	LVS	HOM	MAR	PHO			43rd	72	
2025	Sam Hunt Racing	24	Toyota	DAY	ATL	COA	PHO	LVS	HOM	MAR	DAR	BRI	CAR	TAL	TEX	CLT	NSH	MXC	POC	ATL	CSC	SON	DOV	IND	IOW	GLN	DAY	PIR	GTW	BRI	KAN	ROV	LVS; 22	TAL	MAR	PHO			96th	0^{1}	
^{†} – Qualified for David Reutimann

==== Craftsman Truck Series ====
NASCAR Craftsman Truck Series results
Year	Team	No.	Make	1	2	3	4	5	6	7	8	9	10	11	12	13	14	15	16	17	18	19	20	21	22	23	24	25	NCTC	Pts	Ref
2020	Niece Motorsports	40	Chevy	DAY	LVS	CLT	ATL	HOM	POC	KEN	TEX	KAN	KAN	MCH	DRC	DOV	GTW	DAR; 27											35th	138	
2020	Niece Motorsports	45	Chevy																RCH; 29	BRI; 36	LVS	TAL; 2	KAN; 10	TEX; 29	MAR; 11	PHO; 18			35th	138	
2023	Rackley W.A.R.	25	Chevy	DAY	LVS	ATL	COA	TEX	BRD	MAR	KAN	DAR	NWS	CLT	GTW	NSH	MOH	POC	RCH	IRP	MLW	KAN	BRI	TAL	HOM; 14	PHO			104th	0^{1}	
2025	Tricon Garage	1	Toyota	DAY	ATL	LVS	HOM	MAR	BRI	CAR	TEX	KAN	NWS	CLT	NSH	MCH	POC	LRP	IRP	GLN	RCH	DAR; 5	BRI	NHA	ROV	TAL	MAR	PHO	45th	34	

^{*} Season still in progress
^{1} Ineligible for series points

=== ARCA Racing Series ===
(key) (Bold – Pole position awarded by qualifying time. Italics – Pole position earned by points standings or practice time. * – Most laps led.)

ARCA Racing Series results
Year	Team	No.	Make	1	2	3	4	5	6	7	8	9	10	11	12	13	14	15	16	17	18	19	20	ARSC	Pts	Ref
2015	Cunningham Motorsports	22	Ford	DAY	MOB	NSH	SLM	TAL	TOL	NJE	**POC**; 1*	MCH	CHI	WIN	IOW	IRP	POC	BLN	ISF	DSF	SLM	KEN	KAN	85th	245	

==== Camping World East Series ====
NASCAR Camping World East Series results
Year	Team	No.	Make	1	2	3	4	5	6	7	8	9	10	11	12	13	NCWESC	Pts	Ref
2007	Rocky Bayne	00	Chevy	GRE	ELK	IOW; DNQ	SBO	STA	NHA	TMP	NSH	ADI	LRP	MFD; 26	NHA	DOV	65th	104	
2008	Dale Earnhardt, Inc.	1	Chevy	GRE; 9	IOW; 3	SBO; 25	GLN; 3	NHA; 2	**TMP**; 1	NSH; 12	ADI; 2	LRP; 17	MFD; 20	NHA; 8	**DOV**; 21	STA; 2	4th	1855	
2009	Dave Davis	9	Chevy	GRE	TRI; 6	IOW	SBO	GLN	NHA	TMP	ADI	LRP	NHA	DOV			50th	150	

==== K&N Pro Series West ====
NASCAR K&N Pro Series West results
Year	Team	No.	Make	1	2	3	4	5	6	7	8	9	10	11	12	13	NKNPSWC	Pts	Ref
2015	Bill McAnally Racing	60	Ford	KCR	IRW	TUS	IOW	SHA	SON; 10	SLS	IOW	EVG	CNS	MER	AAS	PHO	49th	34	

Achievements
Preceded by Jamie McMurray	Daytona 500 winner 2011	Succeeded by Matt Kenseth
