= 2012 NASCAR Stock V6 Series =

Stock car racing series

Seasons
- ← 2011 2013 →

2012 NASCAR Stock V6 Series was the support series for the 2012 NASCAR Toyota Series season, which was the fourth season of the series. Twelve races were raced, all on oval tracks.

== Report ==
The season began in Autódromo Potosino, where the local driver, Oscar Torres, Jr. won the race. Oscar Torres, Jr. won back-to-back the race in Querétaro. The third race in Mexico City, again saw win Oscar Torres, Jr. Torres increased his gap to 16 points ahead of Javier Campos. In Puebla the rain avoided the classification, the grid was according to the championship. The race was again dominated by Oscar Torres, Jr., who increased his lead to 22 points. However Oscar Torres, Jr. won 8 races and Javier Campos only 1, the final gap was 25 points and Oscar Torres, Jr. was declared the 2012 season champion.

Guadalajara was supposed to return after a year's absence. However, it was cancelled and replaced by El Dorado Speedway Chihuahua, which debuted in the series.

== Drivers ==
Team	Manufacturer	Tires	No.	Race Driver	Rounds
Dynamic Motorsport	Mazda	H	6	Oscar Torres, Jr.	All
Dynamic Motorsport	Mazda	H	8	Javier Campos	All
Megaracing		H	7	Diego Mendoza	1–3, 5–6
Megaracing	Mazda	H	53	Ricardo Hernández	1–11
Liqui Moly Cuadritos Racing	Toyota	H	12	Héctor González, Jr.	All
Liqui Moly Cuadritos Racing	Toyota	H	19	Carlos Azcarate (R)	2–12
OAM Racing Team		H	23	Gisela Ponce	All
Tame Racing	Toyota	H	17	Santiago Tovar (R)	All

== 2012 calendar ==
2012 NTS venues.

No.	Race Title	Track	Date	Time	
No.	Race Title	Track	Date	Local	UTC
1	San Luis Potosí	(San Luis Potosí) Autódromo Potosino, Villa de Zaragoza	15 April	11:10	16:10
2	Querétaro	Autódromo Querétaro, Santiago de Querétaro	29 April	11:10	16:10
3	Ciudad de México	Autódromo Hermanos Rodríguez, Mexico City	12 May	18:10	23:10
4	Puebla	Autódromo Miguel E. Abed, Puebla	27 May	11:30	16:30
5	Aguascalientes	Autódromo Internacional de Aguascalientes, Aguascalientes	17 June	TBA	TBA
6	Ciudad de México	Autódromo Hermanos Rodríguez, Mexico City	8 July	TBA	TBA
7	San Luis Potosí	(San Luis Potosí) Autódromo Potosino, Villa de Zaragoza	29 July	TBA	TBA
8	Querétaro	Autódromo Querétaro, Santiago de Querétaro	12 August	TBA	TBA
9	Aguascalientes	Autódromo Internacional de Aguascalientes, Aguascalientes	25 August	TBA	TBA
10	Puebla	Autódromo Miguel E. Abed, Puebla	9 September	TBA	TBA
11	Chihuahua 200	(Chihuahua (state)) El Dorado Speedway, Chihuahua	29 October	TBA	TBA
12	Mexico Fest 200	Autódromo Hermanos Rodríguez, Mexico City	11 November	TBA	TBA

== Results ==
=== Races ===
No.	Race	Pole position	Most laps led	Winning driver	Winning manufacturer
1	San Luis Potosí	Javier Campos	Oscar Torres, Jr.	Oscar Torres, Jr.	Mazda
2	Querétaro	Oscar Torres, Jr.	Oscar Torres, Jr.	Oscar Torres, Jr.	Mazda
3	Mexico City	Oscar Torres, Jr.	Oscar Torres, Jr.	Oscar Torres, Jr.	Mazda
4	Puebla	Oscar Torres, Jr. ^{1}	Oscar Torres, Jr.	Oscar Torres, Jr.	Mazda
5	Aguascalientes	Tony Garza	Santiago Tovar	Javier Campos	Mazda
6	Mexico City	Oscar Torres, Jr.	Oscar Torres, Jr.	Oscar Torres, Jr.	Mazda
7	San Luis Potosí	Santiago Tovar	Oscar Torres, Jr.	Oscar Torres, Jr.	Mazda
8	Querétaro	Oscar Torres, Jr.	Oscar Torres, Jr.	Oscar Torres, Jr.	Mazda
9	Aguascalientes	Oscar Torres, Jr.	Oscar Torres, Jr.	Jean Franco Tomasello	
10	Puebla	Oscar Torres, Jr.	Oscar Torres, Jr.	Oscar Torres, Jr.	Mazda
11	Chihuahua	Jean Franco Tomasello		Héctor González, Jr.	Toyota
12	Mexico City	Jorge Contreras, Sr.	Jorge Contreras, Sr.	Erik Mondragón	

1Qualifying cancelled by rain.

=== Standings ===
(key) Bold - Pole position awarded by time. Italics - Pole position set by final practice results or rainout. * – Most laps led. ** – All laps led.

Rank	Driver	SLP	QRO	MXC	PUE	AGS	MX2	SL2	QR2	AG2	PU2	CHI	MX3	Points
1	Oscar Torres, Jr.	1*	**1***	**1***	1*	13	**1***	1*	**1****	**5***	**1****	2	9	526
2	Javier Campos	**2**	2	2	2	1	2	4	5	2	5	5	3	501
3	Héctor González, Jr.	4	6	5	7	4	5	2	2	11	11	1	12	462
4	Santiago Tovar **(R)**	5	3	4	3	3*	12	**3**	4	3	2	6	2	462
5	Erik Mondragón	9	8	7	9	5	4	15	10	12	4	3	1	444
6	Mauro Vega **(R)**	6	13	6	5	11	10	8	9	7	13	8	6	426
7	Gisela Ponce **(R)**	11	10	9	11	8	9	11	8	9	8	7	5	422
8	Ricardo Hernández	7	5	8	12	6	14	7	7	10	9	9		390
9	Carlos Azcarate **(R)**		9	10	8	2	11	12	3	14	12	12	4	387
10	Juan C. Buitrón	10		11	10	7	7	6		6	10		7	322
11	Tony Garza		11	3	4	**15**	8	13		4	7			286
12	Enrique Baca **(R)**					12	6	9	6	8	6		13	241
13	Jean Franco Tomasello **(R)**									1	3	**4**	10	164
14	Diego Mendoza	13	12	12		10	13							160
15	Jorge Contreras, Sr.					9	3	5					**8***	153
16	Neftalí Mondragón **(R)**	12	4					14				11		135
17	Valdemar Treviño	3	7											78
18	David Adissi **(R)**								11	13				64
19	Rodrigo Echeverría				6									38
20	Rafael Vallina	8												36
21	Roberto Espinosa, Jr. **(R)**							10						34
22	Ignacio Fontes											10		34
23	Christian Calvo **(R)**												11	33
24	Jorge Contreras, Jr.			13										31
25	Daniel Espinoza					14								30
Rank	Driver	SLP	QRO	MXC	PUE	AGS	MX2	SL2	QR2	AG2	PU2	CHI	MX3	Points
	References													

== See also ==
- 2012 NASCAR Sprint Cup Series
- 2012 NASCAR Nationwide Series
- 2012 NASCAR Camping World Truck Series
- 2012 NASCAR K&N Pro Series East
- 2012 ARCA Racing Series
- 2012 NASCAR Whelen Modified Tour
- 2012 NASCAR Whelen Southern Modified Tour
- 2012 NASCAR Canadian Tire Series
- 2012 NASCAR Toyota Series
- 2012 Racecar Euro Series
