= Juan Carlos Blum =

Mexican racing driver

- Born: June 7, 1994 (age 32); Guadalajara, Jalisco, Mexico

NASCAR O'Reilly Auto Parts Series career
- 13 races run over 2 years
- 2013 position: 40th
- Best finish: 40th (2013)
- First race: 2012 Dollar General 300 (Chicagoland)
- Last race: 2013 Dollar General 300 (Chicagoland)
Wins	Top tens	Poles
0	0	0
- Statistics up to date as of November 16, 2013.

Juan Carlos Blum (born June 7, 1994) is a Mexican professional stock car racing driver.

== Career ==
After beginning his racing career in karts, Blum began competing in the NASCAR Mini Stock Series in his native Mexico in 2009; he posted five wins in the series, with a best finish in the standings of second in 2010. He moved to the United States to continue his racing career in 2011, driving for Revolution Racing in late model events in Virginia and the Carolinas; he also competed in a single race in the NASCAR Corona Series during the year, having made two starts in the series in 2010.

After the 2011 season Blum tested an ARCA Racing Series car at Daytona International Speedway; during 2012 he competed in the Corona Series, finishing 18th in points with a best finish of ninth. He also made his debut in ARCA competition, competing in two races with a best finish of 15th, and drove in three Nationwide Series events for Rick Ware Racing, finishing 26th in his series debut at Chicagoland Speedway.

In February 2013, it was announced that Blum would compete full-time in the Nationwide Series for Rick Ware Racing, driving the No. 15. Blum wound up competing in ten races during the season, with a best finish of 26th at Phoenix International Raceway.

== Motorsports career results ==
=== NASCAR ===
(key) (Bold – Pole position awarded by qualifying time. Italics – Pole position earned by points standings or practice time. * – Most laps led.)

==== Nationwide Series ====
NASCAR Nationwide Series results
Year	Team	No.	Make	1	2	3	4	5	6	7	8	9	10	11	12	13	14	15	16	17	18	19	20	21	22	23	24	25	26	27	28	29	30	31	32	33	NNSC	Pts	Ref
2012	Rick Ware Racing	41	Chevy	DAY	PHO	LVS	BRI	CAL	TEX	RCH	TAL	DAR	IOW	CLT	DOV	MCH	ROA	KEN	DAY	NHA	CHI	IND	IOW	GLN	MON	BRI	ATL	RCH	CHI; 26	KEN	DOV	CLT	KAN	TEX; 29	PHO	HOM; 37	68th	40	
2013	Rick Ware Racing	15	Ford	DAY; 37	PHO; 26	LVS; 28	BRI	CAL; 29	TEX; 29																												40th	140	
2013	Mike Harmon Racing	74	Chevy							RCH; 29	TAL	DAR	CLT; 28	DOV	IOW; 35	MCH; 30	ROA	KEN	DAY	NHA	CHI	IND	IOW	GLN	MOH	BRI	ATL	RCH									40th	140	
2013	Rick Ware Racing	23	Ford																										CHI; 29	KEN	DOV	KAN	CLT	TEX	PHO	HOM	40th	140	

=== ARCA Racing Series ===
(key) (Bold – Pole position awarded by qualifying time. Italics – Pole position earned by points standings or practice time. * – Most laps led.)

ARCA Racing Series results
Year	Team	No.	Make	1	2	3	4	5	6	7	8	9	10	11	12	13	14	15	16	17	18	19	20	ARSC	Pts	Ref
2012	Donnie Neuenberger	18	Dodge	DAY	MOB	SLM	TAL	TOL; 29	ELK	POC														81st	240	
2012	Carter 2 Motorsports	97	Dodge								MCH; 15	WIN	NJM	IOW	CHI	IRP	POC	BLN	ISF	MAD	SLM	DSF	KAN	81st	240	
