= Enrique Contreras III =

Mexican stock car racing driver

- Born: May 22, 1992 (age 34); Mexico City, Mexico

NASCAR O'Reilly Auto Parts Series career
- 1 race run over 1 year
- 2015 position: 79th
- Best finish: 79th (2015)
- First race: 2015 Axalta Faster. Tougher. Brighter. 200 (Phoenix)
Wins	Top tens	Poles
0	0	0

NASCAR FedEx Freight Truck Series career
- 3 races run over 2 years
- 2016 position: 57th
- Best finish: 57th (2016)
- First race: 2014 Kroger 200 (Martinsville)
- Last race: 2016 Careers for Veterans 200 (Michigan)
Wins	Top tens	Poles
0	0	0

NASCAR Mexico Series career
- 47 races run over 5 years
- 2015 position: 16th
- Best finish: 16th (2015)
- First race: 2011 Potosina 200 (Potosino)
- Last race: 2015 Alcatel Onetouch 240 (Mexico City)
Wins	Top tens	Poles
0	7	0
- Statistics up to date as of August 27, 2016.

Enrique Contreras III (born May 22, 1992) is a Mexican former professional stock car racing driver. He has competed in the NASCAR Xfinity Series, NASCAR Camping World Truck Series, and most notably, NASCAR Mexico Series. He is the son of former Indy Lights racer Enrique Contreras II and nephew of NASCAR driver Carlos Contreras.

== Racing career ==
=== Regional series ===
==== Mexico Series ====
Contreras has run the full schedule before, in 2011, 2014 and 2015. He broke through in 2014, scoring his first four top-ten finishes while finishing all but one race (mechanical problems at Nuevo Autodromo de Queretaro). In 2015, he added three more top-tens, with just one crash.

==== K&N Pro Series East ====
Contreras made his K&N Pro Series East debut in 2012, driving four races. He recorded a best finish of 11th at Greenville-Pickens Speedway. In 2013, Contreras ran the first three races of the season, scoring 25th at Bristol Motor Speedway, 19th at Greensville-Pickens and 24th at Five Flags Speedway.

=== National series ===
==== Camping World Truck Series ====
Contreras debuted in 2014, driving the No. 07 RaceTrac Chevrolet Silverado for Rick Ware Racing and SS-Green Light Racing to a 20th-place finish at Martinsville Speedway. He returned to the Truck Series in 2016, driving the No. 71 Chevrolet Silverado for his family Contreras Motorsports at Gateway, finishing 20th.

==== Xfinity Series ====
Contreras' first race was the 2015 Axalta Faster. Tougher. Brighter. 200 for Rick Ware Racing, finishing 34th in the No. 15 Adhler Pinturas/Coen Supply Chevrolet Camaro.

== Motorsports career results ==
=== NASCAR ===
(key) (Bold – Pole position awarded by qualifying time. Italics – Pole position earned by points standings or practice time. * – Most laps led.)

==== Xfinity Series ====
NASCAR Xfinity Series results
Year	Team	No.	Make	1	2	3	4	5	6	7	8	9	10	11	12	13	14	15	16	17	18	19	20	21	22	23	24	25	26	27	28	29	30	31	32	33	NXSC	Pts	Ref
2015	Rick Ware Racing	15	Chevy	DAY	ATL	LVS	PHO; 34	CAL	TEX	BRI	RCH	TAL	IOW	CLT	DOV	MCH	CHI	DAY	KEN	NHA	IND	IOW	GLN	MOH	BRI	ROA	DAR	RCH	CHI	KEN	DOV	CLT	KAN	TEX	PHO	HOM	79th	10	

==== Camping World Truck Series ====
NASCAR Camping World Truck Series results
Year	Team	No.	Make	1	2	3	4	5	6	7	8	9	10	11	12	13	14	15	16	17	18	19	20	21	22	23	NCWTC	Pts	Ref
2014	Rick Ware Racing	07	Chevy	DAY	MAR	KAN	CLT	DOV	TEX	GTW	KEN	IOW	ELD	POC	MCH	BRI	MSP	CHI	NHA	LVS	TAL	MAR; 20	TEX	PHO	HOM		70th	24	
2016	Contreras Motorsports	71	Chevy	DAY	ATL	MAR	KAN	DOV	CLT	TEX	IOW	GTW; 20	KEN	ELD	POC	BRI	MCH; 28	MSP	CHI	NHA	LVS	TAL	MAR	TEX	PHO	HOM	57th	18	

^{*} Season still in progress
^{1} Ineligible for series points
