= FAIR Girls =

Anti human-trafficking organization

- Founded: 2003; 23 years ago Washington, D.C., U.S.
- Type: Non-profit
- Location: Washington, D.C., U.S.
- Services: Education, Advocacy, Survivor Support
- Key people: Caroline Tower Morris
- Website: fairgirls.org

FAIR Girls (formerly FAIR Fund) is an anti-human-trafficking organization, founded in 2003 by Andrea Powell and Caroline Tower Morris, and headquartered in Washington, D.C. The FAIR acronym stands for Free, Aware, Inspired, Restored. They operate in Bosnia, Montenegro, Serbia, Russia, Uganda, and the United States. NASCAR driver Stanton Barrett is an executive board member and has prominently advertised for FAIR Girls through his cars.

FAIR Girls focuses on providing direct services and long-term care for survivors sex trafficking and labor exploitation. The organization received funding from the Office for Victims of Crime in 2019. FAIR Girls is heavily featured in Believe Me: The True Story of How a Trafficked Teen and Her Advocate Changed the Justice System and Found True Freedomby Andrea Powell. The Vida Home, the first safe home for survivors of human trafficking in Washington, D.C., has provided emergency and transitional housing since 2014.
