= NASCAR Stock V6 Series =

Mexican auto racing series

- Category: Stock cars
- Country: Mexico
- Inaugural season: 2011
- Folded: 2016
- Teams: 40
- Last Drivers' champion: Alejandro González
- Official website: www.nascarmexico.com

NASCAR Stock V6 Series was the feeder series of NASCAR Toyota Series between 2011 and 2015. It has replaced the former NASCAR Mexico T4 Series/NASCAR Mini Stocks Series.

The Stock V6 Series Series featured the largest grid in Mexican motor sports, with more than 30 teams running full-time and a few others doing a limited schedule. It is also notorious for the diversity of its drivers. As the series allows drivers to debut at age 15, several young Mexican talents are choosing the Stock V6 Series to start their NASCAR careers. On the other hand, there are several groups of 40-50 drivers who have been racing in the series since the former NASCAR Mexico T4 Series.

The series ran a 10-race schedule from March to October. Races are shown live on AYM Sports, a Mexican sport-related satellite TV station available in Mexico, Central America, and the south of the United States.

== History ==
The series was the replacement for NASCAR Mexico T4 Series/ NASCAR Mini Stocks, which was created together with Desafío Corona, in 2004, replacing the former Reto Neon (Neon Challenge). It used to be a low-cost racing series.

In 2011 was created the NASCAR Stock V6 Series, the major difference of the series was that the cars increased to six-cylinder engines, different of the four-cylinder engines of the NASCAR T4 Series/Mini Stock Series. The series was called Stock V6 Series between 2011 and 2014. Starting in 2015, the series was renamed to NASCAR Mexico Pro Series The NASCAR Mexico Series (premier division) was folded after the end of the 2015 season. The NASCAR Mexico Pro Series had a season in 2016 but without NASCAR-sanction and was called only Pro Series V6, it was a support series of the Super Copa Telcel, where almost all of the former NASCAR Mexico drivers drove in 2016.

In 2017, the NASCAR PEAK Mexico Series (premier division) returned and they create a new feeder division called NASCAR FedEx Challenge Series, which had V8 engines, instead of six-cylinder of the Stock V6 Series, consequently the Stock V6 Series was folded.

== Media ==
Races are shown live on AYM Sports on Sundays at 11:30 AM local time. Several replays are also shown during the week. The races are also analyzed in the AYM sports news programs on Mondays. The series is arguably one of the most important events of the network.

Additionally, a brief summary of every race is usually shown during the broadcast of the NASCAR Mexico Corona Series events on Televisa Deportes and the Latin American version of Speed Channel.

The series is also covered in "ESTO", one of the most famous sports newspapers in the country. Local radio and TV stations also hold interviews with some of the most popular drivers to increase awareness of the series among the fans.

== Champions ==
| Season | Driver | Owner(s) | No. | Manufacturer | Starts | Wins | Top 10s | Poles | Points (margin) |
NASCAR-sanctioned (feeder series of the NASCAR Mexico Series)
| 2011 | Rubén García Jr. | HDI Seguros/Dynamic Motorsports | 4 | Mazda | 10 | 7 | 10 | 5 | 1820 (244) |
| 2012 | Oscar Torres Jr. | Escudería Suspensión y Dirección/DAR Refaccionarias | 6 | Mazda | 12 | 8 | 11 | 5 | 526 (25) |
| 2013 | Erik Mondragón | Neuman Star Racing | 20 | Mazda/Toyota | 12 | 5 | 12 | 3 | 536 (62) |
| 2014 | Ramiro Fidalgo Jr. | Cedva Racing Team/Roshfrans Racing | 58 | Mazda | 10 | 2 | 10 | 8 | 436 (36) |
| 2015 | Alejandro González | Tame Racing | 15 | | 10 | 2 | 10 | 6 | 423 (11) |
Without NASCAR sanction (feeder series of the Super Copa Telcel)
| 2016 | Alejandro de Alba | Anvi Motorsports | 14 | Mazda | 10 | 3 | 10 | 4 | ? |

Without NASCAR sanction

== Notable alumni ==
- Michel Jourdain Jr., Former Champ Car World Series driver and race winner; current World Touring Car Championship driver.
- Rubén Pardo, 2006 NASCAR Grand National Division, Busch East Series Rookie of the Year.
- Several current NASCAR Mexico Corona Series drivers, including Carlos Pardo, Germán Quiroga, Mike Sánchez, Abraham Calderón, Rubén Rovelo, Patricio Jourdain, Luis Felipe Montaño, Daniel Suárez, among others.
