= Joey Gase =

American racing driver (born 1993)

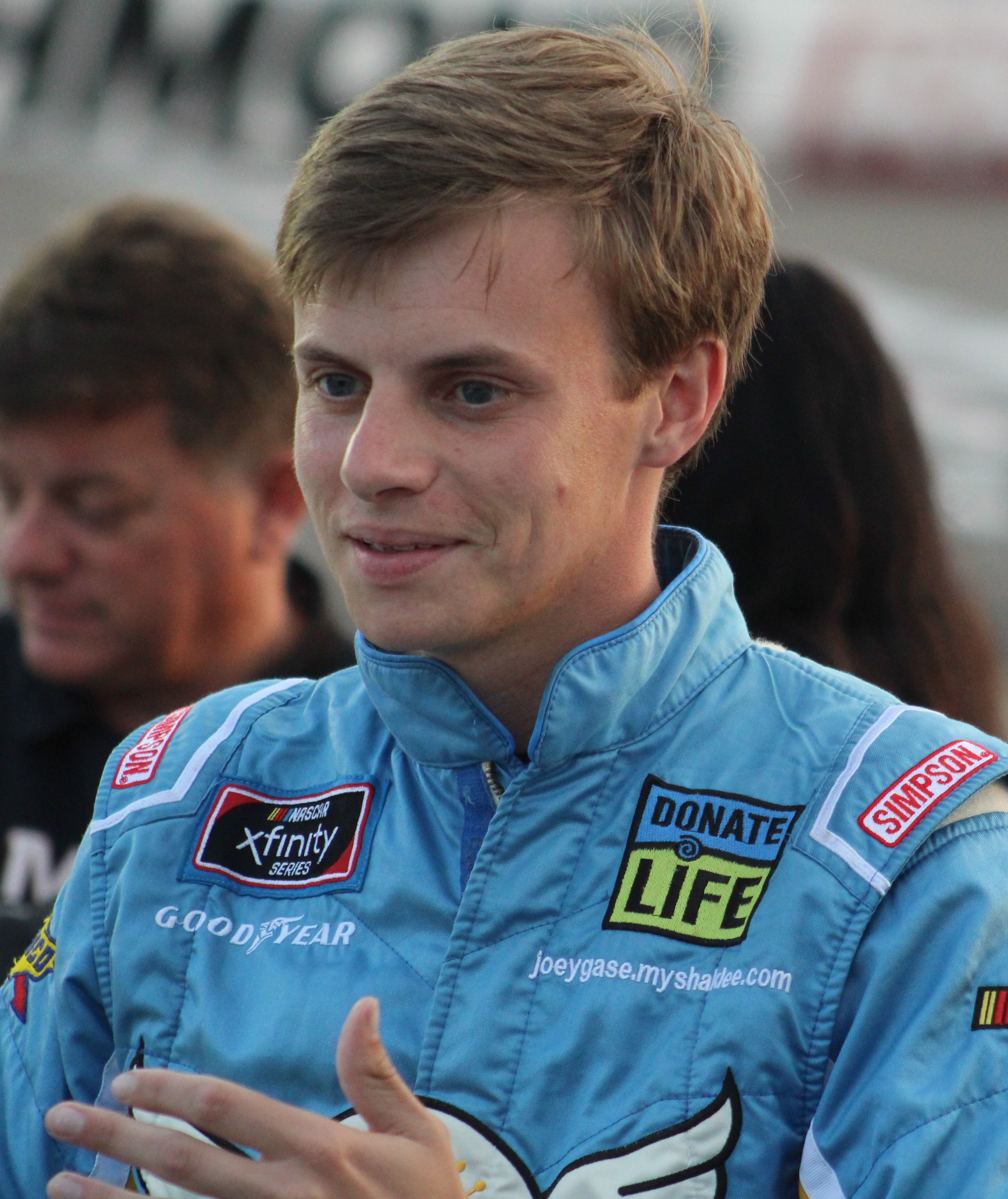
- Gase at Richmond Raceway in 2019
- Born: Joseph Robert Gase; February 8, 1993 (age 33); Cedar Rapids, Iowa, U.S.
- Awards: 2015 Comcast Community Champion Award

NASCAR Cup Series career
- 96 races run over 11 years
- 2026 position: 46th
- Best finish: 44th (2020)
- First race: 2014 MyAFibStory.com 400 (Chicagoland)
- Last race: 2026 YellaWood 500 (Talladega)
Wins	Top tens	Poles
0	0	0

NASCAR O'Reilly Auto Parts Series career
- 332 races run over 16 years
- Car no., team: No. 55 (Joey Gase Motorsports with Scott Osteen)
- 2026 position: 29th
- Best finish: 20th (2014, 2018)
- First race: 2011 U.S. Cellular 250 (Iowa)
- Last race: 2026 O'Reilly Auto Parts 300 (Homestead)
Wins	Top tens	Poles
0	4	0

NASCAR FedEx Freight Truck Series career
- 6 races run over 3 years
- 2022 position: 100th
- Best finish: 100th (2022)
- First race: 2018 Active Pest Control 200 (Atlanta)
- Last race: 2022 Worldwide Express 250 (Richmond)
Wins	Top tens	Poles
0	0	0

ARCA Menards Series career
- 1 race run over 1 year
- Best finish: 119th (2010)
- First race: 2010 Prairie Meadows 200 (Iowa)
Wins	Top tens	Poles
0	0	0

ARCA Menards Series East career
- 3 races run over 2 years
- Best finish: 40th (2010)
- First race: 2010 Goodyear Dealers of Iowa 200 (Iowa)
- Last race: 2011 Visit Hampton VA 175 (Langley)
Wins	Top tens	Poles
0	0	0
- Statistics up to date as of November 7, 2026.

Joseph Robert Gase (born February 8, 1993) is an American professional stock car racing driver and team owner. He currently competes part-time in the NASCAR O'Reilly Auto Parts Series, driving the No. 55 Chevrolet Camaro SS for Joey Gase Motorsports with Scott Osteen. He has previously competed in the NASCAR Cup Series and NASCAR Camping World Truck Series.

== Early career and personal life ==
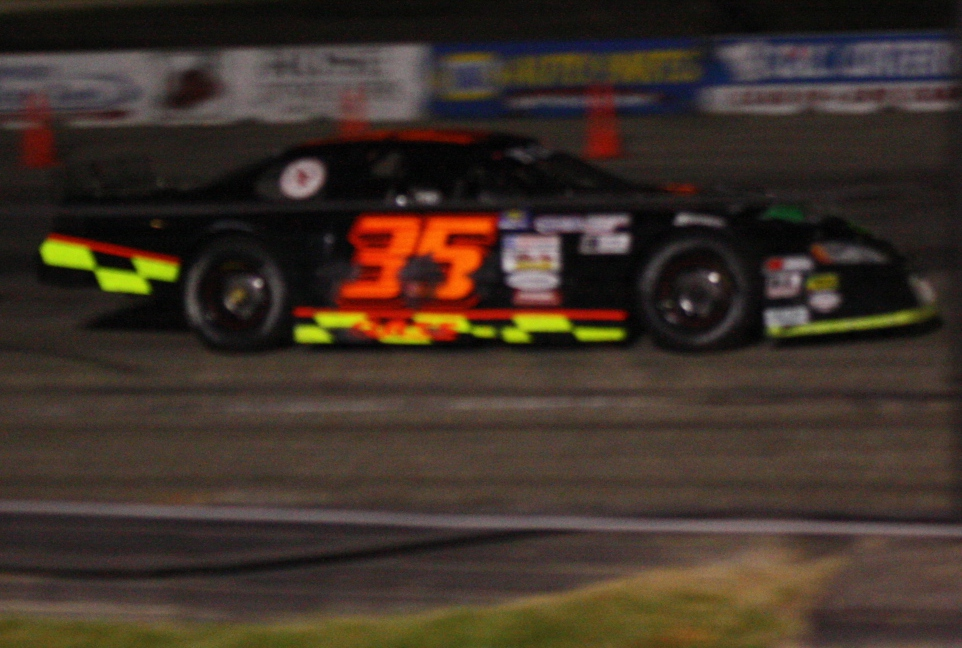
Gase in a super late model at La Crosse, 2010

Gase started racing at Hawkeye Downs Speedway in the track's junior classes in 2001. He won the track modified B championship at La Crosse Fairgrounds Speedway in 2007, the youngest driver to do so. In 2009, he became the youngest driver to win the track's late model championship at Hawkeye Downs Speedway. Gase graduated from Xavier High School in Cedar Rapids in 2011.

Gase's mother, Mary Jo, died from a brain aneurysm when Gase was eighteen years old. Gase was awarded the inaugural Comcast Community Champion Award at the joint Xfinity and Camping World Truck Series banquet after the 2015 season. The award was in recognition of Gase's efforts to promote organ donation, to honor his mother, whose donated organs helped 66 others after her death.

== NASCAR ==
=== Camping World Truck Series ===
Gase made his Truck Series debut at Atlanta, driving a start-and-park truck for Jennifer Jo Cobb Racing. He started 26th and finished 31st.

On September 28, 2018, it was announced that Gase joined Copp Motorsports for one race at Talladega with Sparks Energy being the sponsor.

=== Xfinity Series ===
After running a limited schedule of American Speed Association races starting in 2008, and selected ARCA Racing Series, USAR Pro Cup Series, and NASCAR K&N Pro Series East races in 2010 and 2011, Gase made his first start in NASCAR's Nationwide Series at Iowa Speedway in August 2011. Driving for Go Green Racing in the No. 39 Ford, Gase made five starts during the second half of the 2011 season; throughout those races, he posted the best finish of twentieth and an average finish of 25th.

In January 2012, it was announced that Gase would drive the No. 39 Ford for Go Green Racing for the entire 2012 Nationwide Series season, competing for rookie of the year honors. Gase was planned to be the lead driver of a two-car team for Go Green Racing; the team's second car, the No. 04, would be driven by several drivers. A lack of sponsorship meant that Gase only ran a partial season, competing for several teams.

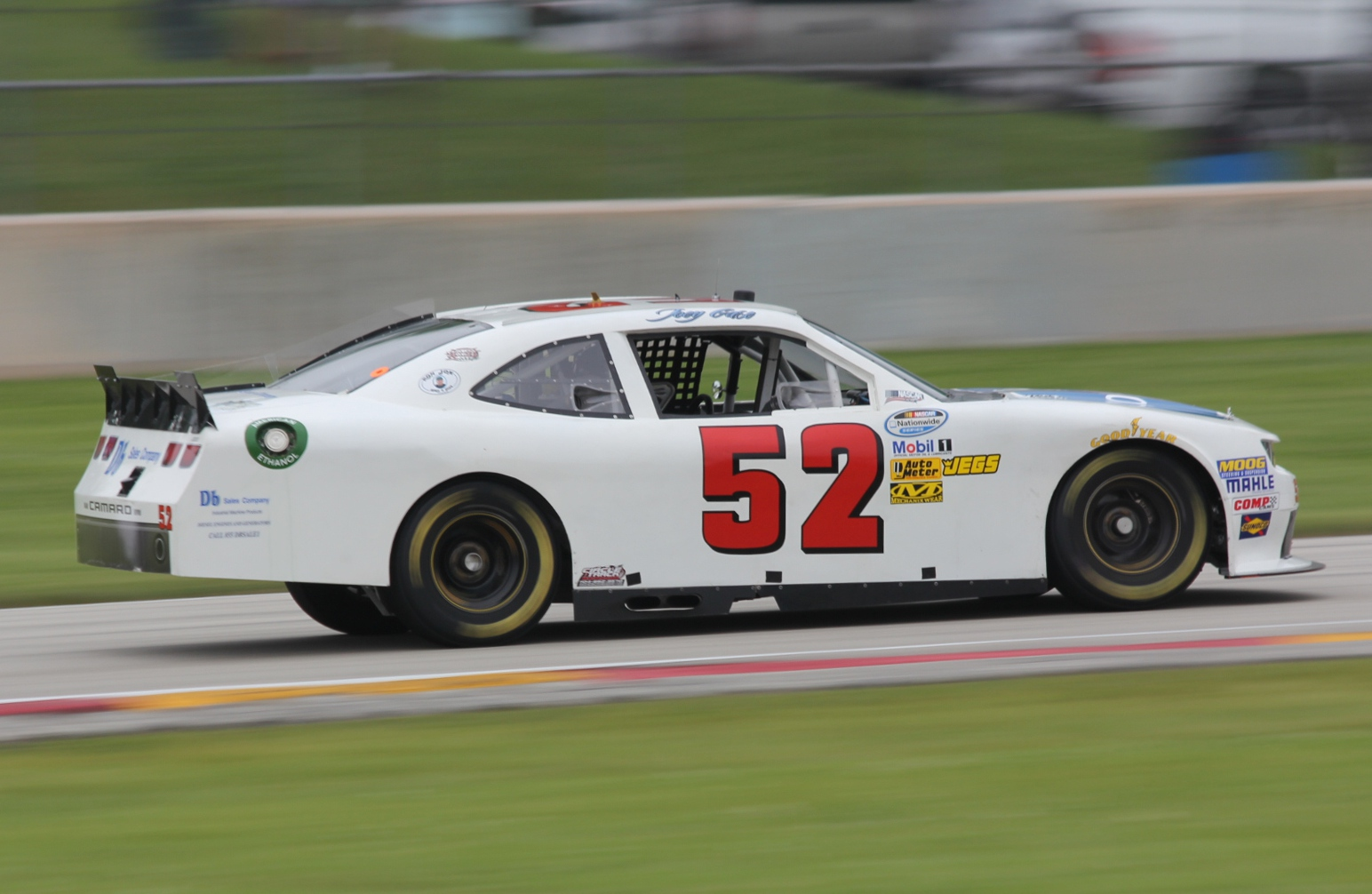
Gase racing the No. 52 Means Racing car at Road America in 2014

In December 2012, Gase announced that he would be driving for Jimmy Means Racing full-time in the Nationwide Series for 2013; partway through the season he began running for Go Green Racing as well as Means due to a lack of sponsorship.

In the 2015 race at Las Vegas Motor Speedway, Gase was replaced by Dexter Bean after suffering food poisoning prior to the race. Gase started the race, and was replaced by Bean during the event. On May 2, Gase earned his best career finish, placing fifth in the Winn-Dixie 300 at Talladega.

On January 5, 2018, it was announced Gase would drive the No. 35 Chevrolet Camaro owned by Go Green Racing (the sister team to Go Fas Racing) in the NASCAR Xfinity Series full-time for the 2018 season, even though he left Jimmy Means Racing to seek more opportunities in the Cup Series.

In 2019, Gase joined MBM Motorsports to run the full Xfinity schedule in the team's No. 35 Toyota Supra.

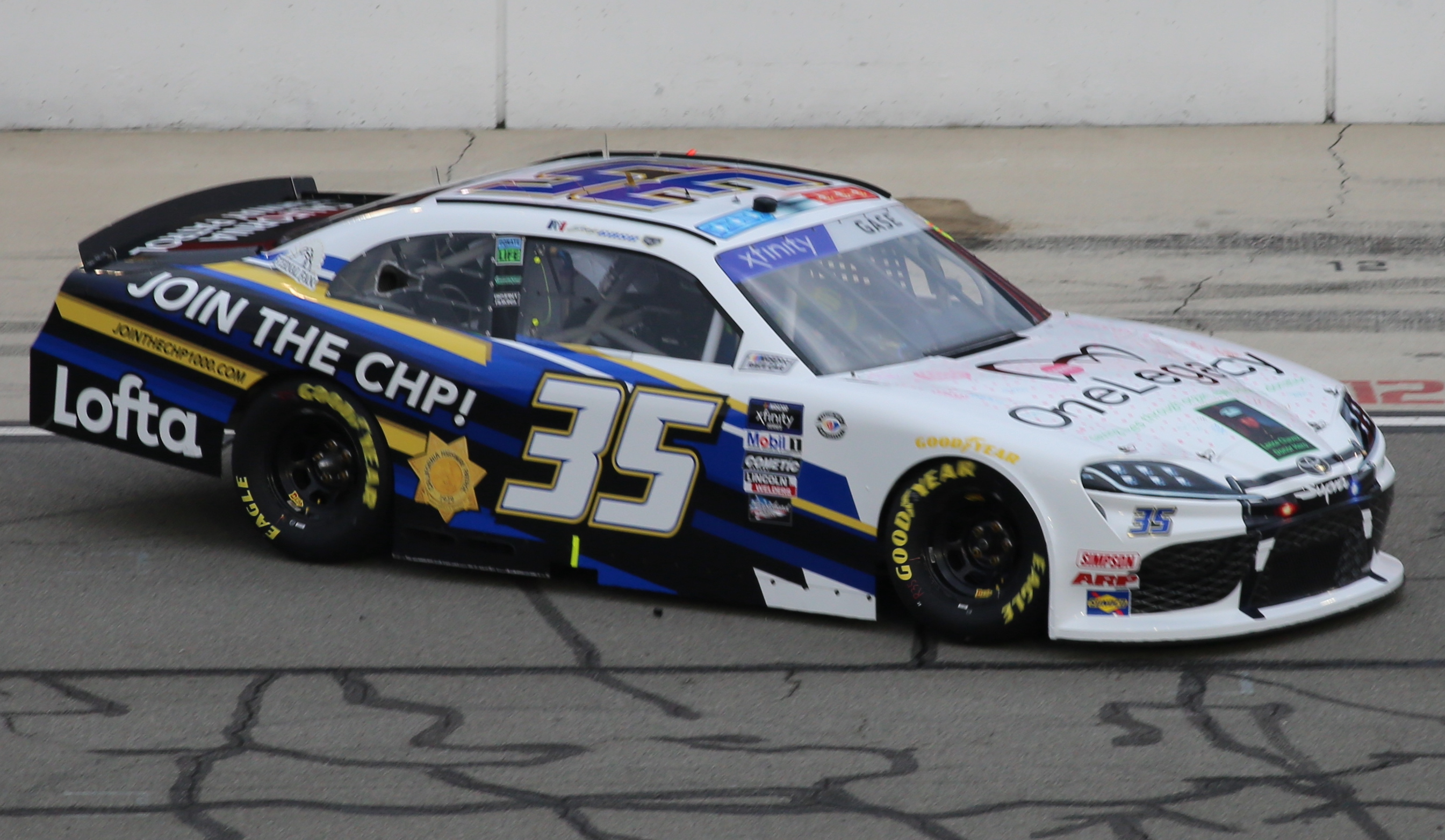
Gase at Auto Club Speedway in 2023

Gase continued to race part-time in the Xfinity Series from 2020 onward. Although much of his 2020 and 2021 schedules were in the Cup Series, he declared for Xfinity points in both seasons, the latter of which came midseason when he switched points in order to run the Talladega Dash 4 Cash race. At Talladega, when he drove for Jimmy Means Racing, the car was a Ford which Gase himself had owned.

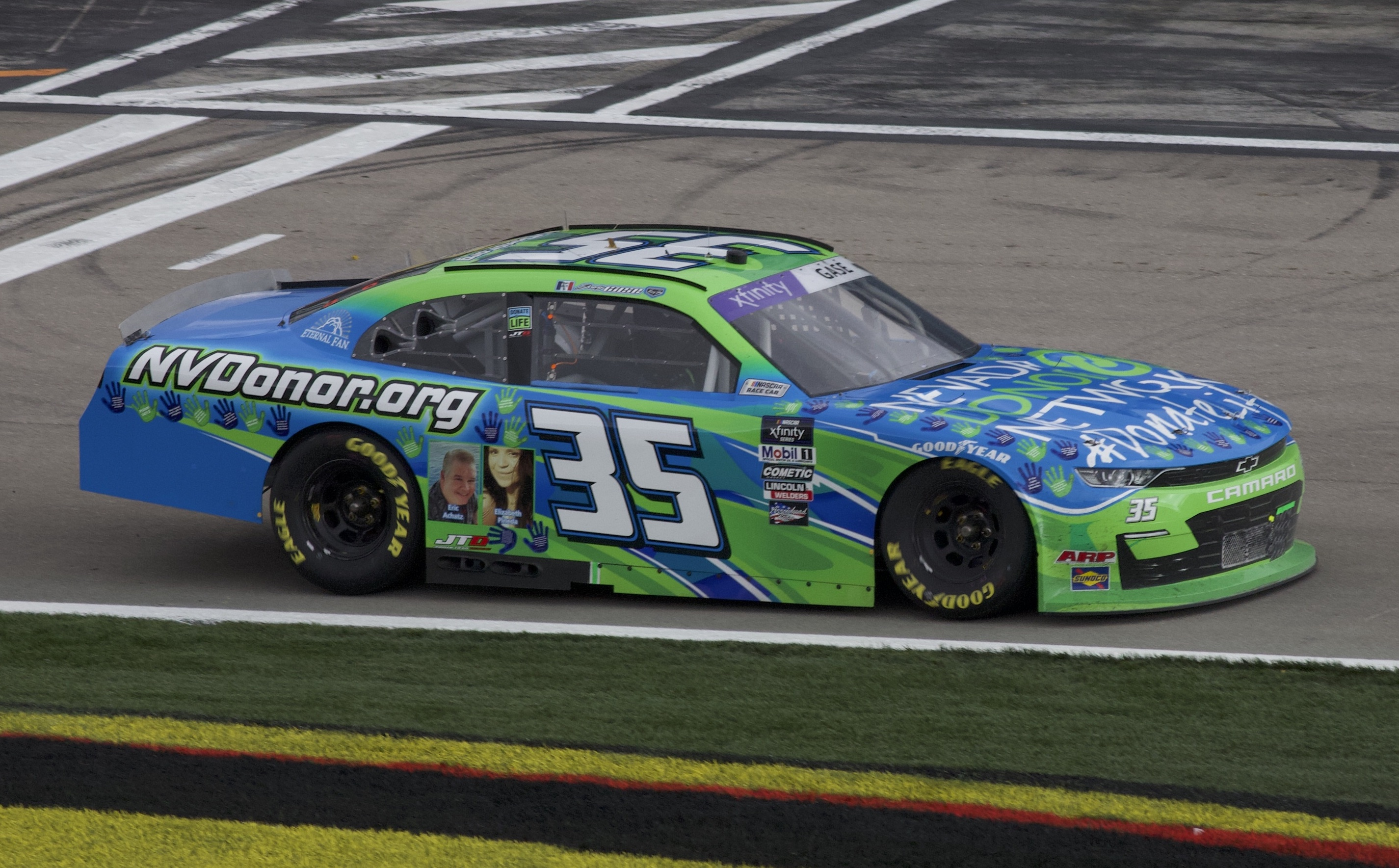
Gase's No. 35 car at Las Vegas Motor Speedway in 2024.

At the 2024 ToyotaCare 250 at Richmond Raceway, Gase was involved in a crash during the final laps. In the heat of the moment, he tore off his bumper and threw it at the No. 4 car of Dawson Cram. NASCAR fined Gase US$5,000 for a safety violation, which may be imposed for any action or omission by a competitor or vehicle that creates an unsafe environment or poses a threat to the safety of the competitors.

=== Cup Series ===
On August 27, 2014, Gase announced he would make his Sprint Cup Series debut in the No. 32 Ford with Go FAS Racing in the 2014 MyAFibStory.com 400 at Chicagoland. Gase returned in 2015 with Go FAS Racing at Richmond, but finished 43rd after Aric Almirola tapped him, sending him head-on into the SAFER barrier.

In December 2016, Gase joined BK Racing in the No. 23 Toyota Camry for three races starting at the 2017 Daytona 500. In May, he signed with Premium Motorsports to drive the No. 15 at Talladega's GEICO 500. The No. 15 received sponsorship from Sparks Energy, who also sponsored the Talladega Xfinity race. In July, Gase ran the second of his three-race schedule with BK at the Quaker State 400.

In January 2018, it was announced that Gase would also drive a part-time No. 33 Ford for Circle Sport Racing which invested in Go FAS Racing's No. 32 Cup Series Ford. However, the deal fell through. Gase drove at Las Vegas for Premium Motorsports' No. 55, also drove the No. 00 for StarCom Racing at Talladega's spring race, and Coke Zero 400 and the No. 23 for BK Racing at Darlington.

In conjunction with his Xfinity ride with MBM for 2019, Gase also joined the team's Cup program, driving the No. 66 Toyota part-time starting with the Daytona 500. For the Digital Ally 400 at Kansas, he drove a second MBM car, the No. 46. In July, Gase drove the No. 53 Chevrolet for Rick Ware Racing in the Coke Zero Sugar 400 at Daytona.

Gase began racing full-time in the Cup Series in 2020 with Ware, though he did not compete for Cup points. For the 2021 GEICO 500 weekend, which included running the Xfinity race, Gase switched to No. 28 and ran a tribute paint scheme to Davey Allison.

At the 2021 South Point 400 at Las Vegas Motor Speedway, Gase was involved in a scary crash when his No. 15 RWR car lost a tire and slammed into the wall, sending the car airborne. Gase was transported to the hospital and released a few hours later.

On August 20, 2024, it was revealed that Gase would return to race during the 2024 Coke Zero Sugar 400, driving the No. 44 Chevrolet for NY Racing Team, his first start in the Cup Series since 2021. Despite qualifying 39th and losing the draft early on, he would end up finishing the race twentieth, tying with the team's best finish at Atlanta in 2022.

== Motorsports career results ==
=== Racing career summary ===
Season	Series	Team	Races	Wins	Top 5	Top 10	Points	Position
2010	NASCAR K&N Pro Series East	Spraker Racing	2	0	0	0	221	40th
2010	ARCA Racing Series	Spraker Racing	1	0	0	0	95	119th
2011	NASCAR K&N Pro Series East	VSI Racing	1	0	0	0	170	49th
2011	NASCAR Nationwide Series	Go Green Racing	5	0	0	0	93	43rd
2012	NASCAR Nationwide Series	Go Green Racing	6	0	0	0	236	30th
2012	NASCAR Nationwide Series	Hamilton Means Racing	11	0	0	0	236	30th
2013	NASCAR Nationwide Series	Go Green Racing	2	0	0	0	242	31st
2013	NASCAR Nationwide Series	Hamilton Means Racing	18	0	0	0	242	31st
2014	NASCAR Nationwide Series	Jimmy Means Racing	33	0	0	0	482	20th
2014	NASCAR Sprint Cup Series	Go Fas Racing	4	0	0	0	0	NC†
2015	NASCAR Xfinity Series	Jimmy Means Racing	33	0	1	1	545	21st
2015	NASCAR Sprint Cup Series	Go Fas Racing	3	0	0	0	0	NC†
2016	NASCAR Xfinity Series	Jimmy Means Racing	33	0	0	0	437	22nd
2016	NASCAR Sprint Cup Series	Go Fas Racing	6	0	0	0	0	NC†
2017	NASCAR Xfinity Series	Jimmy Means Racing	33	0	0	2	336	22nd
2017	Monster Energy NASCAR Cup Series	BK Racing	5	0	0	0	0	NC†
2017	Monster Energy NASCAR Cup Series	Premium Motorsports	4	0	0	0	0	NC†
2018	NASCAR Camping World Truck Series	JJC Racing	2	0	0	0	0	NC†
2018	NASCAR Xfinity Series	Go Green Racing	33	0	0	0	495	20th
2018	Monster Energy NASCAR Cup Series	Premium Motorsports	1	0	0	0	0	NC†
2018	Monster Energy NASCAR Cup Series	StarCom Racing	5	0	0	0	0	NC†
2018	Monster Energy NASCAR Cup Series	Rick Ware Racing	1	0	0	0	0	NC†
2018	Monster Energy NASCAR Cup Series	BK Racing	1	0	0	0	0	NC†
2019	NASCAR Gander Outdoors Truck Series	JJC Racing	2	0	0	0	0	NC†
2019	NASCAR Xfinity Series	MBM Motorsports	32	0	0	0	339	24th
2019	Monster Energy NASCAR Cup Series	MBM Motorsports	10	0	0	0	0	NC†
2019	Monster Energy NASCAR Cup Series	Rick Ware Racing	1	0	0	0	0	NC†
2020	NASCAR Xfinity Series	RSS Racing	1	0	0	0	58	49th
2020	NASCAR Xfinity Series	B. J. McLeod Motorsports	1	0	0	0	58	49th
2020	NASCAR Xfinity Series	SS-Green Light Racing	2	0	0	0	58	49th
2020	NASCAR Cup Series	Rick Ware Racing	32	0	0	0	0	NC†
2020	NASCAR Cup Series	Tommy Baldwin Racing	1	0	0	0	0	NC†
2021	NASCAR Xfinity Series	SS-Green Light Racing	1	0	0	0	32	57th
2021	NASCAR Xfinity Series	Jimmy Means Racing	4	0	0	0	32	57th
2021	NASCAR Cup Series	Rick Ware Racing	15	0	0	0	0	NC†
2022	NASCAR Camping World Truck Series	On Point Motorsports	1	0	0	0	0	NC†
2022	NASCAR Camping World Truck Series	Young's Motorsports	1	0	0	0	0	NC†
2022	NASCAR Xfinity Series	Emerling-Gase Motorsports	10	0	0	0	147	38th
2023	NASCAR Xfinity Series	Emerling-Gase Motorsports	13	0	0	1	152	36th
2024	NASCAR Xfinity Series	Joey Gase Motorsports	14	0	0	0	148	36th
2024	NASCAR Cup Series	NY Racing Team	1	0	0	0	0	NC†
2025	NASCAR Xfinity Series	Joey Gase Motorsports	17	0	0	0	189	34th
2025	NASCAR Cup Series	NY Racing Team	1	0	0	0	0	NC†
2025	NASCAR Cup Series	Garage 66	1	0	0	0	0	NC†
2026	NASCAR O'Reilly Auto Parts Series	Joey Gase Motorsports	27	0	0	0	255	29th
2026	NASCAR Cup Series	NY Racing Team	3	0	0	0	0	NC†

^{†} As Gase was a guest driver, he was ineligible for championship points.

=== NASCAR ===
(key) (Bold – Pole position awarded by qualifying time. Italics – Pole position earned by points standings or practice time. * – Most laps led.)

==== Cup Series ====
NASCAR Cup Series results
Year	Team	No.	Make	1	2	3	4	5	6	7	8	9	10	11	12	13	14	15	16	17	18	19	20	21	22	23	24	25	26	27	28	29	30	31	32	33	34	35	36	NCSC	Pts	Ref
2014	Go Fas Racing	32	Ford	DAY	PHO	LVS	BRI	CAL	MAR	TEX	DAR	RCH	TAL	KAN	CLT	DOV	POC	MCH	SON	KEN	DAY	NHA	IND	POC	GLN	MCH	BRI	ATL	RCH	CHI; 37	NHA	DOV	KAN; 37	CLT	TAL	MAR	TEX; 37	PHO; 33	HOM	68th	0^{1}	
2015	Go Fas Racing	32	Ford	DAY	ATL	LVS	PHO	CAL	MAR	TEX	BRI	RCH; 43	TAL	KAN; 38	CLT	DOV	POC	MCH	SON	DAY	KEN	NHA	IND	POC	GLN	MCH	BRI	DAR	RCH	CHI	NHA	DOV	CLT	KAN	TAL	MAR	TEX; DNQ	PHO; 42	HOM	72nd	0^{1}	
2016	Go Fas Racing	32	Ford	DAY	ATL	LVS	PHO; 32	CAL	MAR; 36	TEX	BRI	RCH	TAL	KAN; 34	DOV	CLT	POC	MCH	SON	DAY	KEN	NHA	IND	POC	GLN	BRI	MCH	DAR	RCH	CHI; 40	NHA	DOV	CLT	KAN; 35	TAL	MAR	TEX; 36	PHO	HOM	57th	0^{1}	
2017	BK Racing	23	Toyota	DAY; 23	ATL	LVS	PHO	CAL	MAR	TEX	BRI	RCH									KEN; 36	NHA					BRI; 34	DAR	RCH	CHI	NHA	DOV	CLT	TAL; 32	KAN	MAR				55th	0^{1}	
2017	Premium Motorsports	15	Toyota										TAL; 21	KAN	CLT	DOV	POC	MCH	SON	DAY																				55th	0^{1}	
2017	Premium Motorsports	15	Chevy																				IND; 25	POC	GLN	MCH														55th	0^{1}	
2017	Premium Motorsports	7	Chevy																																		TEX; 32	PHO; 30		55th	0^{1}	
2017	BK Racing	83	Toyota																																				HOM; 39	55th	0^{1}	
2018	Premium Motorsports	55	Chevy	DAY	ATL	LVS; 32	PHO	CAL	MAR	TEX	BRI	RCH																												59th	0^{1}	
2018	StarCom Racing	00	Chevy										TAL; 27	DOV	KAN	CLT	POC	MCH	SON	CHI	DAY; 25	KEN	NHA	POC	GLN	MCH	BRI				RCH; 35	ROV	DOV	TAL; 18	KAN	MAR; 35				59th	0^{1}	
2018	Rick Ware Racing	51	Ford																																		TEX; 37	PHO	HOM	59th	0^{1}	
2018	BK Racing	23	Toyota																									DAR; 40	IND	LVS										59th	0^{1}	
2019	MBM Motorsports	66	Toyota	DAY; DNQ	ATL	LVS; 38	PHO	CAL; 35	MAR	TEX	BRI	RCH; 33	TAL	DOV		CLT; 32	POC	MCH	SON	CHI								DAR; 34	IND	LVS; 38	RCH	ROV	DOV	TAL; 36	KAN; 38	MAR	TEX	PHO; 38	HOM	54th	0^{1}	
2019	MBM Motorsports	46	Toyota												KAN; 38																									54th	0^{1}	
2019	Rick Ware Racing	53	Chevy																		DAY; 27	KEN	NHA	POC	GLN	MCH	BRI													54th	0^{1}	
2020	Rick Ware Racing	51	Chevy	DAY; 23								BRI; 33		MAR; 35																										44th	0^{1}	
2020	Rick Ware Racing	53	Chevy				PHO; 29																																	44th	0^{1}	
2020	Rick Ware Racing	53	Ford		LVS; 31	CAL; 33																							DAY; 31											44th	0^{1}	
2020	Rick Ware Racing	51	Ford					DAR; 30	DAR; 29	CLT; 36	CLT; 39		ATL; 38		HOM; 36	TAL; 37	POC; 37	POC; 33	IND; 26	KEN; 34	TEX; 32	KAN; 29	NHA; 34				DOV; 35	DOV; 40		DAR; 33	RCH; 35	BRI; 31	LVS; 35	TAL; 17	ROV	KAN; 37	TEX; 37	MAR; 34	PHO; 32	44th	0^{1}	
2020	Tommy Baldwin Racing	7	Chevy																					MCH; 39	MCH	DRC														44th	0^{1}	
2021	Rick Ware Racing	53	Ford	DAY; 20	DRC	HOM																												TAL; 25	ROV					50th	0^{2}	
2021	Rick Ware Racing	15	Chevy				LVS; 34	PHO						KAN; 35	DAR	DOV	COA	CLT	SON	NSH; 29	POC	POC	ROA	ATL	NHA	GLN	IRC	MCH; 37		DAR; 29	RCH; 33	BRI	LVS; 37							50th	0^{2}	
2021	Rick Ware Racing	53	Chevy						ATL; 35	BRD	MAR	RCH																								TEX; 39	KAN; 32	MAR; 38	PHO; 29	50th	0^{2}	
2021	Rick Ware Racing	28	Ford										TAL; 34																											50th	0^{2}	
2021	Rick Ware Racing	15	Ford																										DAY; 31											50th	0^{2}	
2024	NY Racing Team	44	Chevy	DAY	ATL	LVS	PHO	BRI	COA	RCH	MAR	TEX	TAL	DOV	KAN	DAR	CLT	GTW	SON	IOW	NHA	NSH	CSC	POC	IND	RCH	MCH	DAY; 20	DAR	ATL	GLN	BRI	KAN	TAL	ROV	LVS	HOM	MAR	PHO	52nd	0^{1}	
2025	Garage 66	66	Ford	DAY	ATL	COA	PHO	LVS	HOM	MAR	DAR	BRI	TAL	TEX	KAN	CLT	NSH	MCH	MXC	POC	ATL	CSC	SON	DOV	IND	IOW; 37	GLN	RCH												55th	0^{1}	
2025	NY Racing Team	44	Chevy																										DAY; 28	DAR	GTW	BRI	NHA	KAN	ROV	LVS	TAL	MAR	PHO	55th	0^{1}	
2026	NY Racing Team	44	Chevy	DAY	ATL	COA	PHO	LVS	DAR	MAR	BRI	KAN	TAL; 30	TEX	GLN	CLT	NSH	MCH	POC	COR	SON	CHI	ATL	NWS	IND	IOW	RCH	NHA	DAY; 36	DAR	GTW	BRI	KAN	LVS	CLT	PHO	TAL; 21	MAR	HOM	46th	0^{1}	

===== Daytona 500 =====
Year	Team	Manufacturer	Start	Finish
2017	BK Racing	Toyota	29	23
2019	MBM Motorsports	Toyota	DNQ	
2020	Rick Ware Racing	Chevrolet	37	23
2021	Rick Ware Racing	Ford	28	20

==== O'Reilly Auto Parts Series ====
NASCAR O'Reilly Auto Parts Series results
Year	Team	No.	Make	1	2	3	4	5	6	7	8	9	10	11	12	13	14	15	16	17	18	19	20	21	22	23	24	25	26	27	28	29	30	31	32	33	34	NOAPSC	Pts	Ref
2011	Go Green Racing	39	Ford	DAY	PHO	LVS	BRI	CAL	TEX	TAL	NSH	RCH	DAR	DOV	IOW	CLT	CHI	MCH	ROA	DAY	KEN	NHA	NSH	IRP	IOW; 20	GLN	CGV	BRI	ATL	RCH	CHI; 23	DOV	KAN; 29	CLT; 26	TEX; 29	PHO	HOM	43rd	93	
2012	Go Green Racing	39	Ford	DAY; 29	PHO; 25	LVS; 37	BRI; 36	CAL; 23	TEX	RCH	TAL	DAR											IOW; 32	GLN	CGV													30th	236	
2012	Hamilton Means Racing	52	Chevy										IOW; 33	CLT; 25	DOV	MCH	ROA	KEN	DAY; 37	NHA; 27	CHI	IND				BRI; 31	ATL; 43	RCH; DNQ	CHI; 35	KEN; 35	DOV	CLT; DNQ	KAN; 19	TEX; 31	PHO; DNQ	HOM; 32		30th	236	
2013	Hamilton Means Racing	52	Toyota	DAY; DNQ				CAL; 40						DOV; 34		MCH; 27	ROA				CHI; 40								CHI; 35				CLT; DNQ	TEX; 30				31st	242	
2013	Hamilton Means Racing	52	Chevy		PHO; 30	LVS; 33	BRI; Wth		TEX; DNQ									KEN; 32	DAY; 36	NHA; 33		IND; DNQ	IOW; 26	GLN; 33	MOH	BRI; DNQ	ATL; 31	RCH; 32		KEN; 31	DOV; 29	KAN; DNQ			PHO; 29	HOM		31st	242	
2013	Go Green Racing	79	Ford							RCH; 30	TAL	DAR	CLT		IOW; 27																							31st	242	
2014	Jimmy Means Racing	52	Chevy	DAY; 32	PHO; 24		BRI; 29	CAL; 26	TEX; 26	DAR; 26	RCH; 31	TAL; 11	IOW; 27		DOV; 23	MCH; 27	ROA; 30	KEN; 32	DAY; 37	NHA; 29	CHI; 31	IND; 31	IOW; 24	GLN; 36	MOH; 27	BRI; 32	ATL; 30	RCH; 28	CHI; 35	KEN; 28	DOV; 27	KAN; 32	CLT; 26	TEX; 37	PHO; 28	HOM; 39		20th	482	
2014	Jimmy Means Racing	52	Toyota			LVS; 36								CLT; 34																								20th	482	
2015	Jimmy Means Racing	52	Chevy	DAY; 32	ATL; 30	LVS; 27	PHO; 31	CAL; 30	TEX; 31	BRI; 25	RCH; 26	TAL; 5	IOW; 27	CLT; 32	DOV; 29	MCH; 27	CHI; 31	DAY; 30	KEN; 25	NHA; 28	IND; 26	IOW; 34	GLN; 31	MOH; 26	BRI; 27	ROA; 29	DAR; 30	RCH; 27	CHI; 28	KEN; 21	DOV; 24	CLT; 27	KAN; 28	TEX; 26	PHO; 25	HOM; 32		21st	545	
2016	Jimmy Means Racing	52	Chevy	DAY; 32	ATL; 32	LVS; 28	PHO; 33	CAL; 28	TEX; 27	BRI; 31	RCH; 26	TAL; 38	DOV; 23	CLT; 36	POC; 23	MCH; 25	IOW; 25	DAY; 19	KEN; 27	NHA; 25	IND; 28	IOW; 24	GLN; 32	MOH; 28	BRI; 22	ROA; 22	DAR; 24	RCH; 27	CHI; 26	KEN; 31	DOV; 27	CLT; 32	KAN; 23	TEX; 31	PHO; 24	HOM; 37		21st	437	
2017	Jimmy Means Racing	52	Chevy	DAY; 7	ATL; 31	LVS; 30	PHO; 35	CAL; 28	TEX; 26	BRI; 28	RCH; 20	TAL; 16	CLT; 23	DOV; 36	POC; 32	MCH; 25	IOW; 18	DAY; 10	KEN; 33	NHA; 25	IND; 30	IOW; 24	GLN; 29	MOH; 21	BRI; 27	ROA; 32	DAR; 28	RCH; 36	CHI; 27	KEN; 30	DOV; 28	CLT; 31	KAN; 30	TEX; 27	PHO; 33	HOM; 29		22nd	336	
2018	Go Green Racing with SS-Green Light Racing	35	Chevy	DAY; 33	ATL; 26	LVS; 20	PHO; 24	CAL; 16	TEX; 20	BRI; 16	RCH; 22	TAL; 21	DOV; 20	CLT; 17	POC; 19	MCH; 39	IOW; 21	CHI; 22	DAY; 32	KEN; 33	NHA; 22	IOW; 17	GLN; 22	MOH; 24	BRI; 18	ROA; 19	DAR; 21	IND; 15	LVS; 15	RCH; 22	ROV; 23	DOV; 30	KAN; 15	TEX; 22	PHO; 22	HOM; 23		20th	495	
2019	MBM Motorsports	35	Toyota	DAY; 16	ATL; 29	LVS; 38	PHO; 24	CAL; 27	TEX; 24	BRI; 27	RCH; 23	TAL; 37	DOV; 29	CLT; 21	POC; 33	MCH; 29	IOW; 33	CHI; 33	DAY; DNQ	KEN; 22	NHA; 31	IOW; 19	GLN; 34	MOH; 36	BRI; 20	ROA; 19	DAR; 25	IND; 18	LVS; 29	RCH; 20	ROV; 21	DOV; 22	KAN; 32	TEX; 26	PHO; 24	HOM; 27		24th	339	
2020	RSS Racing	93	Chevy	DAY	LVS; 19	CAL	PHO	DAR	CLT	BRI	ATL	HOM	HOM	TAL	POC	IRC	KEN	KEN	TEX	KAN	ROA	DRC	DOV	DOV														49th	58	
2020	B. J. McLeod Motorsports	99	Toyota																						DAY; 28	DAR												49th	58	
2020	SS-Green Light Racing	07	Chevy																								RCH; 20	RCH; 23	BRI	LVS	TAL	ROV	KAN	TEX	MAR	PHO		49th	58	
2021	SS-Green Light Racing with Rick Ware Racing	28	Ford	DAY	DRC	HOM	LVS	PHO	ATL	MAR	TAL; 36	DAR	DOV	COA	CLT	MOH	TEX	NSH																				57th	32	
2021	Jimmy Means Racing	52	Chevy																POC; 36	ROA	ATL	NHA	GLN	IRC	MCH	DAY	DAR	RCH	BRI	LVS			TEX; 30	KAN; 40	MAR	PHO; DNQ		57th	32	
2021	Jimmy Means Racing	52	Ford																												TAL; 15	ROV						57th	32	
2022	Emerling-Gase Motorsports	53	Ford	DAY; 26																																		38th	147	
2022	Emerling-Gase Motorsports	35	Toyota		CAL; 20	LVS; 22	PHO	ATL	COA																			KAN; 30	BRI	TEX; 25						PHO; 24		38th	147	
2022	Emerling-Gase Motorsports	35	Ford							RCH; 34	MAR	TAL; 16	DOV	DAR	TEX	CLT	PIR	NSH	ROA	ATL; 26	NHA	POC	IRC	MCH	GLN	DAY; 16	DAR											38th	147	
2022	Emerling-Gase Motorsports with B. J. McLeod Motorsports	5	Ford																												TAL; 21	ROV	LVS	HOM	MAR			38th	147	
2023	Emerling-Gase Motorsports	53	Ford	DAY; 18														NSH; 31																				36th	152	
2023	Emerling-Gase Motorsports	35	Toyota		CAL; 29	LVS; 38	PHO; 26																						KAN; 24	BRI	TEX; 26	ROV	LVS; 32	HOM	MAR			36th	152	
2023	Emerling-Gase Motorsports	53	Chevy					ATL; 37	COA																													36th	152	
2023	Emerling-Gase Motorsports	35	Ford							RCH; 27	MAR	TAL; 9	DOV	DAR	CLT	PIR	SON																			PHO; 27		36th	152	
2023	SS-Green Light Racing	08	Ford																CSC; DNQ	ATL	NHA																	36th	152	
2023	Emerling-Gase Motorsports	35	Chevy																			POC; 31	ROA	MCH	IRC	GLN	DAY; 14	DAR										36th	152	
2024	Joey Gase Motorsports	53	Chevy	DAY; DNQ																													LVS; 30	HOM	MAR			36th	148	
2024	Joey Gase Motorsports	35	Chevy		ATL; 29	LVS; 30	PHO	COA	RCH; 34		TEX; 30	TAL; 18	DOV	DAR	CLT	PIR	SON	IOW; 16	NHA	NSH	CSC	POC	IND; 24	MCH; 31						KAN; 32	TAL; 21	ROV				PHO; 27		36th	148	
2024	Joey Gase Motorsports	53	Ford							MAR; 28															DAY; 20	DAR	ATL											36th	148	
2024	Joey Gase Motorsports	35	Toyota																									GLN; RL^{†}	BRI									36th	148	
2025	Joey Gase Motorsports with Scott Osteen	53	Chevy	DAY; 15			PHO; 28	LVS; 33						TAL; 21										IND; 28	IOW; 27	GLN	DAY; 21	PIR	GTW; 26	BRI; 35	KAN; 33	ROV	LVS; 35	TAL; 16	MAR	PHO; 30		34th	189	
2025	Joey Gase Motorsports with Scott Osteen	35	Chevy		ATL; 21	COA			HOM; 29	MAR	DAR	BRI	CAR		TEX; 25	CLT	NSH	MXC	POC	ATL; 18	CSC	SON	DOV															34th	189	
2026	Joey Gase Motorsports with Scott Osteen	55	Chevy	DAY; DNQ			PHO; 19	LVS; 29	DAR; 31	MAR; 24		BRI; 31	KAN; 27	TAL; 19	TEX; 28	GLN	DOV	CLT; 23	NSH; 36				CHI; 34		IND; 36		DAY; 23	DAR; 29						TAL; 20				29th	255	
2026	Joey Gase Motorsports with Scott Osteen	35	Chevy		ATL; 34	COA					CAR; 31																											29th	255	
2026	Joey Gase Motorsports with Scott Osteen	55	Ford																	POC; 36				ATL; 37		IOW; 22			GTW; 27	BRI	LVS; 27	CLT; 15	PHO; 33		MAR; 25	HOM; 26		29th	255	
2026	Joey Gase Motorsports with Scott Osteen	53	Chevy																		COR; 23	SON																29th	255	
^{†} – Relieved Thomas Annunziata

==== Camping World Truck Series ====
NASCAR Camping World Truck Series results
Year	Team	No.	Make	1	2	3	4	5	6	7	8	9	10	11	12	13	14	15	16	17	18	19	20	21	22	23	NCWTC	Pts	Ref
2018	JJC Racing	0	Chevy	DAY	ATL; 31	LVS	MAR	DOV; Wth	KAN; 31	CLT	TEX	IOW	GTW	CHI	KEN	ELD	POC	MCH	BRI	MSP	LVS						112th	0^{1}	
2018	Copp Motorsports	83	Chevy																			TAL; DNQ	MAR	TEX	PHO	HOM	112th	0^{1}	
2019	JJC Racing	10	Chevy	DAY	ATL	LVS	MAR	TEX	DOV	KAN; 30	CLT	TEX	IOW	GTW													111th	0^{1}	
2019	JJC Racing	0	Chevy												CHI; 31	KEN	POC	ELD	MCH	BRI	MSP	LVS	TAL	MAR	PHO	HOM	111th	0^{1}	
2022	On Point Motorsports	30	Toyota	DAY	LVS	ATL	COA	MAR	BRD	DAR	KAN	TEX	CLT	GTW	SON	KNX; 24	NSH	MOH	POC	IRP							100th	0^{1}	
2022	Young's Motorsports	20	Chevy																		RCH; 29	KAN	BRI	TAL	HOM	PHO	100th	0^{1}	

^{*} Season still in progress
^{1} Ineligible for series points
^{2} Gase started the 2021 season running for Cup Series points but switched to the Xfinity Series starting at Talladega in April.

=== ARCA Racing Series ===
(key) (Bold – Pole position awarded by qualifying time. Italics – Pole position earned by points standings or practice time. * – Most laps led.)

ARCA Racing Series results
Year	Team	No.	Make	1	2	3	4	5	6	7	8	9	10	11	12	13	14	15	16	17	18	19	20	ARSC	Pts	Ref
2010	Spraker Racing	37	Chevy	DAY	PBE	SLM	TEX	TAL	TOL	POC	MCH	IOW; 27	MFD	POC	BLN	NJE	ISF	CHI	DSF	TOL	SLM	KAN	CAR	119th	95	

==== K&N Pro Series East ====
NASCAR K&N Pro Series East results
Year	Team	No.	Make	1	2	3	4	5	6	7	8	9	10	11	12	NKNPSEC	Pts	Ref
2010	Spraker Racing	08	Chevy	GRE	SBO	IOW; 15	MAR	NHA	LRP	LEE						40th	221	
2010	Spraker Racing	37	Chevy								JFC; 20	NHA	DOV			40th	221	
2011	Vision Racing	97	Chevy	GRE	SBO	RCH	IOW; DNQ	BGS	JFC							49th	170	
2011	VSI Racing	66	Ford							LGY; 25	NHA	COL	GRE	NHA	DOV	49th	170	

==== K&N Pro Series West ====
NASCAR K&N Pro Series West results
Year	Team	No.	Make	1	2	3	4	5	6	7	8	9	10	11	12	13	14	NKNPSWC	Pts	Ref
2011	Vision Racing	97	Chevy	PHO	AAS	MMP	IOW; DNQ	LVS	SON	IRW	EVG	PIR	CNS	MRP	SPO	AAS	PHO	N/A	–	
