= Austin Theriault =

American racecar driver and politician (born 1994)

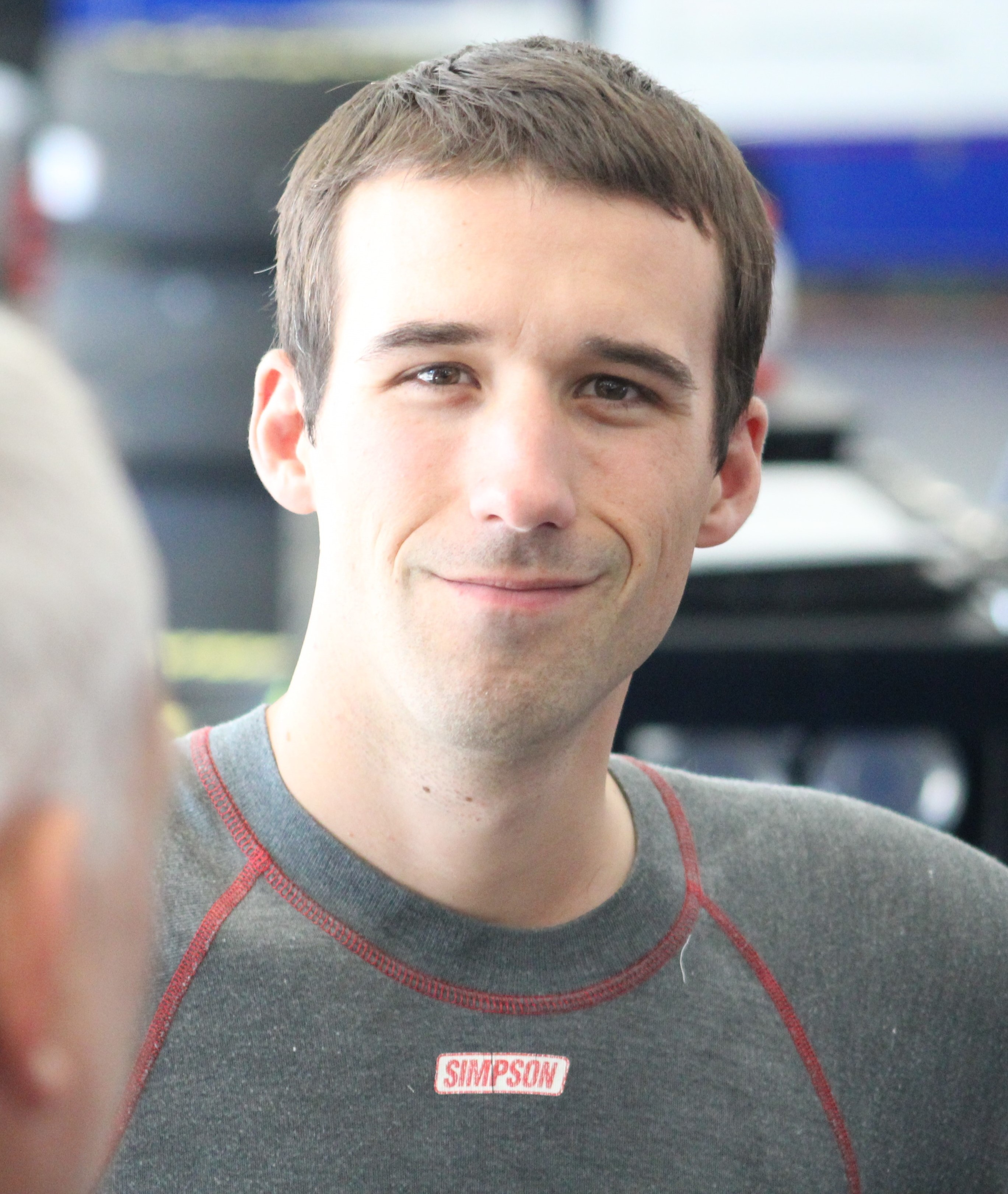
- Theriault in 2019

Member of the Maine House of Representatives from the 1st district
- In office December 7, 2022 – December 4, 2024
- Preceded by: Kristi Mathieson
- Succeeded by: Lucien J.B. Daigle

Personal details
- Born: Austin Leo Theriault; January 23, 1994 (age 32) Fort Kent, Maine, U.S.
- Party: Republican
- Education: Central Piedmont Community College (AA); University of Maine at Presque Isle

NASCAR Cup Series career
- 5 races run over 1 year
- 2019 position: 35th
- First race: 2019 Foxwoods Resort Casino 301 (Loudon)
- Last race: 2019 1000Bulbs.com 500 (Talladega)
| Wins | Top tens | Poles |
|---|---|---|
| 0 | 0 | 0 |

NASCAR O'Reilly Auto Parts Series career
- 6 races run over 2 years
- 2016 position: 120th
- Best finish: 40th (2014)
- First race: 2014 Get To Know Newton 250 (Iowa)
- Last race: 2016 Ticket Galaxy 200 (Phoenix)
| Wins | Top tens | Poles |
|---|---|---|
| 0 | 0 | 0 |

NASCAR FedEx Freight Truck Series career
- 13 races run over 4 years
- 2019 position: 107th
- Best finish: 24th (2015)
- First race: 2015 NextEra Energy Resources 250 (Daytona)
- Last race: 2019 TruNorth Global 250 (Martinsville)
| Wins | Top tens | Poles |
|---|---|---|
| 0 | 5 | 0 |
- Statistics up to date as of November 17, 2019.

Austin Leo Theriault (born January 23, 1994) is an American former professional stock car racing driver and politician who recently served in the Maine House of Representatives for the 1st district from 2022 to 2024. As a driver he currently competes part-time in Asphalt Super Late Model competition, driving the No. 57 Chevrolet Camaro for Mark Henderson Racing. He won the ARCA Racing Series championship in 2017, driving for Ken Schrader Racing.

He was the Republican nominee to be U.S. Representative for Maine's 2nd congressional district in 2024, and was narrowly defeated by incumbent Democrat Jared Golden.

== Racing career ==
=== Early career ===
A native of Fort Kent, Maine, he made his racing debut at the age of thirteen in 2007 at Spud Speedway in Caribou, Maine Driving in the local racing divisions before moving up part-time to the touring late model division in 2009 where he qualified for his first American Canadian Tour race at Oxford Plains Speedway.

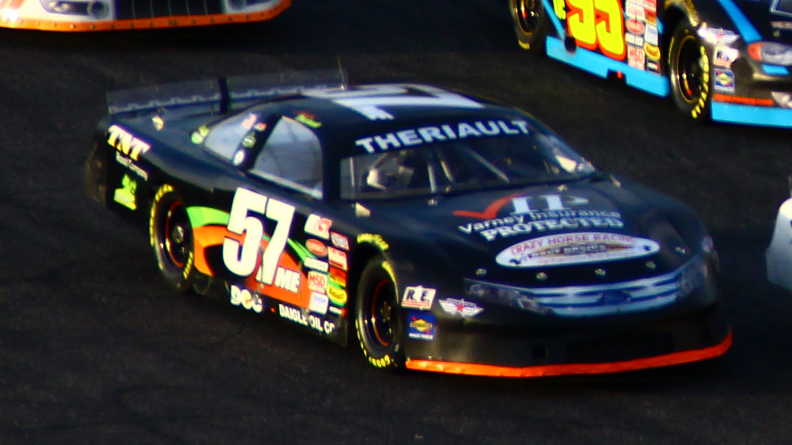
Theriault competing in the ACT race at Circuit Riverside Speedway Ste-Croix in 2011

Theriault joined the ACT Late Model Tour full-time in 2010, finishing seventh in points driving the family-owned #57ME with a best finish of second. He started the 2011 season in a second car for RPM Motorsports, but returned to the family team mid-season, scoring eight top-ten finishes en route to third place in points. In 2012, Theriault finished no worse than ninth all year, scoring eight top-five runs and earning his first career ACT win at Beech Ridge Motor Speedway en route to another third-place points finish.

Theriault started his first Pro All-Stars Series (PASS) Super Late Model Touring Series event in 2010. He became a development driver for Brad Keselowski Racing during the 2012 season, and switched focus to Super Late Models following the ACT season, making selected starts throughout the Southeast for BKR while running part-time in the PASS North Tour in 2013 and 2014. Theriault won four PASS races between 2012 and 2014.

Theriault occasionally competed in other racing events and divisions from 2011 to 2014, including the ARCA Midwest Tour, World Series of Asphalt Stock Car Racing, CARS X-1R Pro Cup Series, Parts for Trucks Pro Stock Tour, Sunoco Gulf Coast Championship Series, CRA JEGS All-Star Tour, CRA Super Series Southern Division, CRA Super Series, ACT and the NASCAR K&N Pro Series East.

On July 20, 2013, Theriault competed in the IWK 250, along with car owner Brad Keselowski, in the No. 29X for BKR. After starting the race in fourth, Theriault had a clean race and brought the car home in an impressive 5th place, just two spots behind Keselowski who finished third.

Theriault has competed five times in the Oxford 250, finishing in the top five in his first four starts with a best finish of second in 2014.

=== Xfinity Series ===
On May 18, 2014, Theriault made his NASCAR Nationwide Series debut at Iowa Speedway, driving the No. 5 Chevrolet Camaro for JR Motorsports where he finished fifteenth. On June 13 of that year, he won his first ARCA race, in Theriault's first start at Michigan International Speedway.

Theriault returned in the Xfinity Series, by practicing in the No. 22 Ford Mustang for Brad Keselowski at Iowa. Theriault later was picked up by Obaika Racing to drive the No. 77 Chevrolet Camaro, starting at Richmond.

=== Gander Outdoors Truck Series ===
In 2015, Theriault began racing part-time with Brad Keselowski Racing, driving the No. 29 Ford F-150. He is sharing the ride with Brad Keselowski, Joey Logano, and Ryan Blaney. He got his career-best finish at Daytona International Speedway in February where he finished fourth. He almost won at New Hampshire Motor Speedway, Theriault's home track where he led late in the race before fading to eighth.

On October 3, 2015, Theriault was involved in a huge crash at Las Vegas Motor Speedway when his BKR teammate Tyler Reddick got loose in turn 4 and clipped him, causing the race truck he was driving to hit nearly head on into the front stretch wall where there were no SAFER barriers installed. Theriault's steering wheel collided with and destroyed his helmet, and he eventually suffered a compression fracture in his lower back as a result of the crash. After missing the next four races, Theriault returned to racing at Homestead-Miami Speedway, finishing 12th. In 2016, he returned to BKR at Daytona, driving the No. 2.

On September 10, 2018, it was announced that Theriault returned to the Truck Series, driving the No. 30 Toyota Tundra for On Point Motorsports at Las Vegas. He finished in eighth place after avoiding multiple crashes.

On February 4, 2019, it was announced that Theriault would drive at least five races for RBR Enterprises, starting at Daytona. Other tracks included Martinsville Speedway (two races), Charlotte Motor Speedway, and Bristol Motor Speedway. The team failed to qualify at Daytona in their first attempt.

=== ARCA Racing Series ===
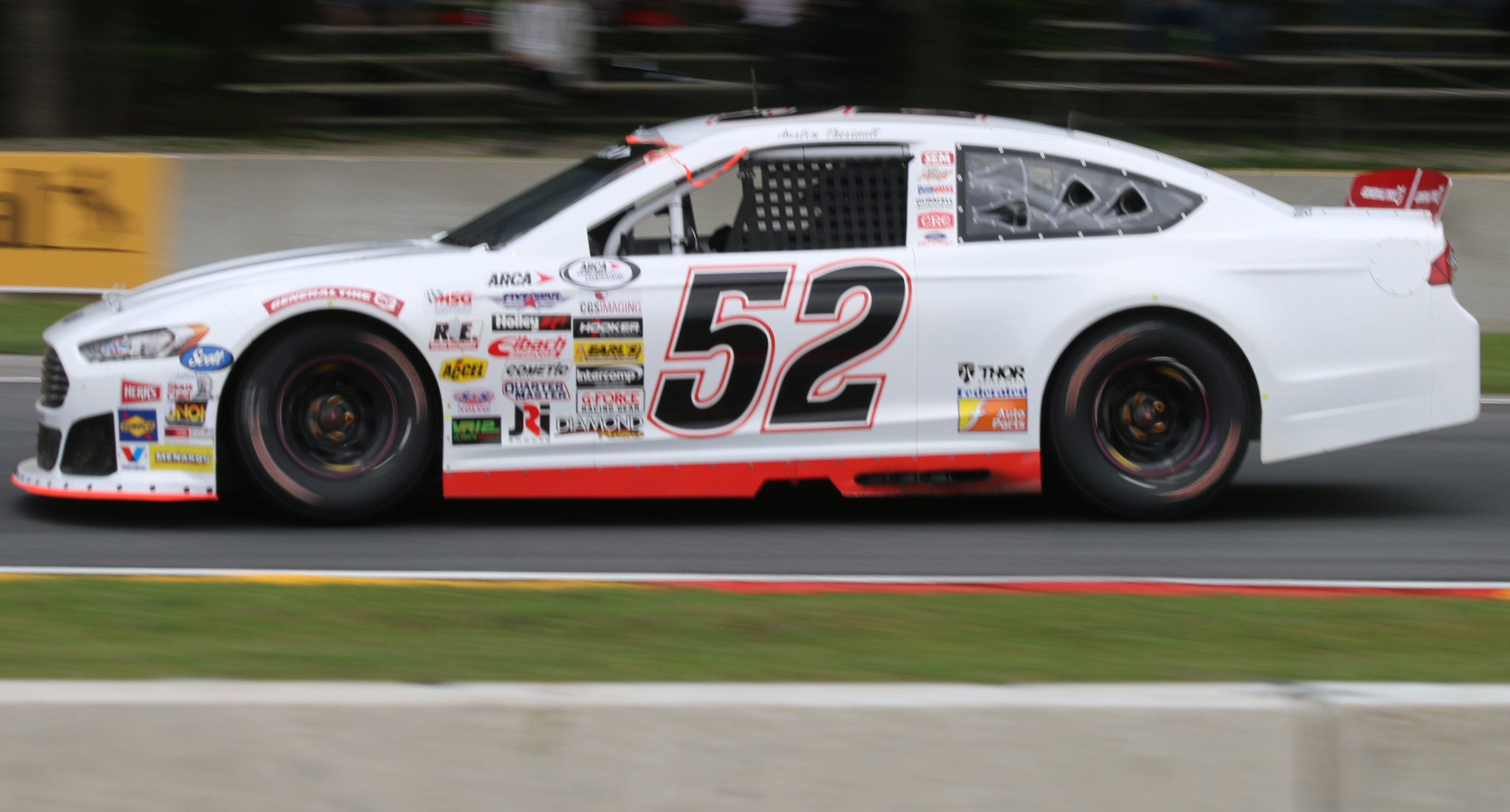
Theriault's winning 2017 ARCA car at Road America

On February 18, 2017, Theriault won his second ARCA race in the season opener at Daytona International Speedway. The race was shortened by five laps after a red-flag was brought out for Justin Fontaine's flip, while rain forced ARCA officials to call the race. In late August, he won at Road America after sorting through two last-lap incidents. He also won the following race at DuQuoin after taking advantage of a late restart, and won the three-peat at Salem driving a Jack Bowsher throwback car. On September 22, 2017, Theriault won at Kentucky Speedway and mathematically clinched the ARCA Racing Series championship for 2017. He won the championship on the strength of seven wins.

=== NASCAR Cup Series ===
On June 29, 2019, it was announced that Theriault would make his Monster Energy NASCAR Cup Series debut at New Hampshire Motor Speedway in July, driving the No. 52 for Rick Ware Racing. After qualifying 36th, he finished 35th in the Foxwoods Resort Casino 301 upon retiring with a rear end issue on lap 185. The following week, he stayed with RWR for the Gander RV 400 at Pocono Raceway.

=== Driver development ===
Theriault has not raced in any major series since 2019. He now owns a driver development business where he teaches aspiring drivers to become better racers.

== Political career ==
=== Maine legislature ===
In March 2022, Theriault ran for the state legislature in Maine as a Republican in the 1st state house district. He won an uncontested Republican primary and was later elected with 71% of the vote. He assumed office on December 7, 2022.

=== 2024 U.S. House election ===
Theriault won the 2024 Republican primary in Maine's 2nd congressional district. His state house district covers much of the congressional district's northern portion. He was defeated by Democratic incumbent Jared Golden in the November 2024 general election.

== Motorsports career results ==
=== NASCAR ===
(key) (Bold – Pole position awarded by qualifying time. Italics – Pole position earned by points standings or practice time. * – Most laps led.)

==== Monster Energy Cup Series ====
Monster Energy NASCAR Cup Series results
| Year | Team | No. | Make | 1 | 2 | 3 | 4 | 5 | 6 | 7 | 8 | 9 | 10 | 11 | 12 | 13 | 14 | 15 | 16 | 17 | 18 | 19 | 20 | 21 | 22 | 23 | 24 | 25 | 26 | 27 | 28 | 29 | 30 | 31 | 32 | 33 | 34 | 35 | 36 | MENCC | Pts | Ref |
|---|---|---|---|---|---|---|---|---|---|---|---|---|---|---|---|---|---|---|---|---|---|---|---|---|---|---|---|---|---|---|---|---|---|---|---|---|---|---|---|---|---|---|
| 2019 | Rick Ware Racing | 52 | Chevy | DAY | ATL | LVS | PHO | CAL | MAR | TEX | BRI | RCH | TAL | DOV | KAN | CLT | POC | MCH | SON | CHI | DAY | KEN | NHA; 35 | | | | | | | | | | | | | | | | | 35th | 17 | |
| 2019 | Rick Ware Racing | 52 | Ford | | | | | | | | | | | | | | | | | | | | | POC; 34 | GLN | MCH; 32 | BRI | DAR | IND | LVS | | | | | | | | | | 35th | 17 | |
| 2019 | Rick Ware Racing | 51 | Chevy | | | | | | | | | | | | | | | | | | | | | | | | | | | | RCH; 32 | CLT | DOV | | | | | | | 35th | 17 | |
| 2019 | Rick Ware Racing | 51 | Ford | | | | | | | | | | | | | | | | | | | | | | | | | | | | | | | TAL; 35 | KAN | MAR | TEX | PHO | HOM | 35th | 17 | |

==== Xfinity Series ====
NASCAR Xfinity Series results
| Year | Team | No. | Make | 1 | 2 | 3 | 4 | 5 | 6 | 7 | 8 | 9 | 10 | 11 | 12 | 13 | 14 | 15 | 16 | 17 | 18 | 19 | 20 | 21 | 22 | 23 | 24 | 25 | 26 | 27 | 28 | 29 | 30 | 31 | 32 | 33 | NXSC | Pts | Ref |
|---|---|---|---|---|---|---|---|---|---|---|---|---|---|---|---|---|---|---|---|---|---|---|---|---|---|---|---|---|---|---|---|---|---|---|---|---|---|---|---|
| 2014 | JR Motorsports | 5 | Chevy | DAY | PHO | LVS | BRI | CAL | TEX | DAR | RCH | TAL | IOW; 15 | CLT | DOV | MCH | ROA | KEN | DAY | NHA; 21 | CHI | IND | IOW | GLN | MOH | BRI | ATL | RCH | CHI | KEN; 18 | DOV | KAN | CLT | TEX | PHO | HOM | 40th | 78 | |
| 2016 | Obaika Racing | 77 | Chevy | DAY | ATL | LVS | PHO | CAL | TEX | BRI | RCH | TAL | DOV | CLT | POC | MCH | IOW | DAY | KEN | NHA | IND | IOW | GLN | MOH | BRI | ROA | DAR | RCH; DNQ | | | | | | | | | 120th | 0^{1} | |
| 2016 | Obaika Racing | 25 | Chevy | | | | | | | | | | | | | | | | | | | | | | | | | RCH; 37 | CHI | KEN | DOV | CLT | KAN | | | | 120th | 0^{1} | |
| 2016 | Rick Ware Racing | 25 | Chevy | | | | | | | | | | | | | | | | | | | | | | | | | | | | | | | TEX; 29 | | | 120th | 0^{1} | |
| 2016 | Team Kapusta Racing | 25 | Chevy | | | | | | | | | | | | | | | | | | | | | | | | | | | | | | | | PHO; 27 | HOM | 120th | 0^{1} | |

==== Gander Outdoors Truck Series ====
NASCAR Gander Outdoors Truck Series results
| Year | Team | No. | Make | 1 | 2 | 3 | 4 | 5 | 6 | 7 | 8 | 9 | 10 | 11 | 12 | 13 | 14 | 15 | 16 | 17 | 18 | 19 | 20 | 21 | 22 | 23 | NGOTC | Pts | Ref |
|---|---|---|---|---|---|---|---|---|---|---|---|---|---|---|---|---|---|---|---|---|---|---|---|---|---|---|---|---|---|
| 2015 | Brad Keselowski Racing | 29 | Ford | DAY; 4 | ATL | MAR | KAN; 14 | CLT | DOV | TEX; 5 | GTW; 10 | IOW; 12 | KEN | ELD | POC | MCH | BRI | MSP | CHI; 13 | NHA; 8 | LVS; 31 | TAL | MAR | TEX | PHO | HOM; 12 | 24th | 279 | |
| 2016 | Brad Keselowski Racing | 2 | Ford | DAY; 27* | ATL | MAR | KAN | DOV | CLT; DNQ | TEX | IOW | GTW | KEN | ELD | POC | BRI | MCH | MSP | CHI | NHA | LVS | TAL | | | | | 53rd | 21 | |
| 2016 | Young's Motorsports | 02 | Chevy | | | | | | | | | | | | | | | | | | | | MAR; 20 | TEX | PHO | HOM | 53rd | 21 | |
| 2018 | On Point Motorsports | 30 | Toyota | DAY | ATL | LVS | MAR | DOV | KAN | CLT | TEX | IOW | GTW | CHI | KEN | ELD | POC | MCH | BRI | MSP | LVS; 8 | TAL | MAR | TEX | PHO | HOM | 63rd | 29 | |
| 2019 | RBR Enterprises | 92 | Ford | DAY; DNQ | ATL | LVS | MAR; 22 | TEX | DOV | KAN | CLT | TEX | IOW | GTW | CHI | KEN | POC | ELD | MCH | BRI | MSP | LVS | TAL | MAR | PHO | HOM | 107th | 0^{1} | |

==== K&N Pro Series East ====
NASCAR K&N Pro Series East results
| Year | Team | No. | Make | 1 | 2 | 3 | 4 | 5 | 6 | 7 | 8 | 9 | 10 | 11 | 12 | 13 | 14 | NKNPSEC | Pts | Ref |
|---|---|---|---|---|---|---|---|---|---|---|---|---|---|---|---|---|---|---|---|---|
| 2012 | Go Green Racing | 38 | Ford | BRI | GRE | RCH | IOW | BGS | JFC | LGY | CNB | COL | IOW | NHA; 19 | DOV | GRE | CAR | 69th | 25 | |
| 2016 | Hattori Racing Enterprises | 1 | Toyota | NSM; 24 | MOB; 4 | GRE; 14 | BRI; 15 | VIR; 3 | DOM; 5 | STA; 7 | COL; 2 | NHA; 5 | IOW; 2 | GLN; 20 | GRE | NJM | DOV | 13th | 383 | |

=== ARCA Racing Series ===
(key) (Bold – Pole position awarded by qualifying time. Italics – Pole position earned by points standings or practice time. * – Most laps led.)

ARCA Racing Series results
| Year | Team | No. | Make | 1 | 2 | 3 | 4 | 5 | 6 | 7 | 8 | 9 | 10 | 11 | 12 | 13 | 14 | 15 | 16 | 17 | 18 | 19 | 20 | ARSC | Pts | Ref |
|---|---|---|---|---|---|---|---|---|---|---|---|---|---|---|---|---|---|---|---|---|---|---|---|---|---|---|
| 2014 | Venturini Motorsports | 66 | Toyota | DAY | MOB | SLM | TAL | TOL | NJE | POC | MCH; 1 | ELK | WIN | CHI | IRP | POC | BLN | ISF | MAD | DSF | SLM | KEN | KAN | 69th | 240 | |
| 2015 | Venturini Motorsports | 55 | Toyota | DAY | MOB | NSH | SLM | TAL | TOL | NJE | POC | MCH | CHI | WIN | IOW | IRP | POC; 4 | BLN | ISF | DSF | SLM | KEN | KAN | 88th | 210 | |
| 2017 | Ken Schrader Racing | 52 | Chevy | DAY; 1 | | | TAL; 4* | | | | | | | | | | | | | | | | | 1st | 4735 | |
| 2017 | Ken Schrader Racing | 52 | Ford | | NSH; 4 | SLM; 5 | | TOL; 6 | | POC; 9 | MCH; 2 | | IOW; 2 | IRP; 4 | POC; 8 | WIN; 3 | | ROA; 1 | | SLM; 1* | CHI; 2 | KEN; 1* | KAN; 25 | 1st | 4735 | |
| 2017 | Ken Schrader Racing | 52 | Toyota | | | | | | ELK; 1 | | | MAD; 1* | | | | | **ISF**; 2 | | DSF; 1 | | | | | 1st | 4735 | |

=== CARS Super Late Model Tour ===
(key)

CARS Super Late Model Tour results
| Year | Team | No. | Make | 1 | 2 | 3 | 4 | 5 | 6 | 7 | 8 | 9 | 10 | 11 | 12 | 13 | CSLMTC | Pts | Ref |
|---|---|---|---|---|---|---|---|---|---|---|---|---|---|---|---|---|---|---|---|
| 2017 | Steve Theriault | 57T | Ford | CON; 11 | DOM | DOM | HCY | HCY | BRI | AND | ROU | TCM | ROU | HCY | CON | SBO | 41st | 22 | |
| 2018 | N/A | 57 | N/A | MYB | NSH | ROU | HCY | BRI | AND | HCY; 18 | ROU | SBO | | | | | 47th | 15 | |

^{*} Season still in progress
^{1} Ineligible for series points
