= 2019 Gander RV 400 =

2019 Gander RV 400 may refer to:

- 2019 Gander RV 400 (Dover), at Dover International Speedway on May 5-6
- 2019 Gander RV 400 (Pocono), at Pocono Raceway on July 28
