= 2019 Foxwoods Resort Casino 301 =

Race details
- Race 20 of 36 in the 2019 Monster Energy NASCAR Cup Series
- The 2019 Foxwoods Resort Casino 301 program cover, featuring Joey Logano.
- Date: July 21, 2019
- Location: New Hampshire Motor Speedway in Loudon, New Hampshire
- Course: Permanent racing facility
- Course length: 1.058 miles (1.703 km)
- Distance: 301 laps, 318.458 mi (512.603 km)
- Average speed: 104.062 miles per hour (167.472 km/h)

Pole position
Driver	Brad Keselowski	Team Penske
- Time: 27.927

Most laps led
Driver	Kyle Busch	Joe Gibbs Racing
- Laps: 118

Winner
No. 4	Kevin Harvick	Stewart-Haas Racing

Television in the United States
- Network: NBCSN
- Announcers: Rick Allen, Jeff Burton, Steve Letarte and Dale Earnhardt Jr.
- Nielsen ratings: 2.794 million

Radio in the United States
- Radio: PRN
- Booth announcers: Doug Rice, Mark Garrow and Wendy Venturini
- Turn announcers: Rob Albright (1 & 2) and Pat Patterson (3 & 4)

The 2019 Foxwoods Resort Casino 301 is a Monster Energy NASCAR Cup Series race held on July 21, 2019 at New Hampshire Motor Speedway in Loudon, New Hampshire. Contested over 301 laps on the 1.058-mile (1.703 km) speedway, it was the 20th race of the 2019 Monster Energy NASCAR Cup Series season.

== Report ==
=== Background ===
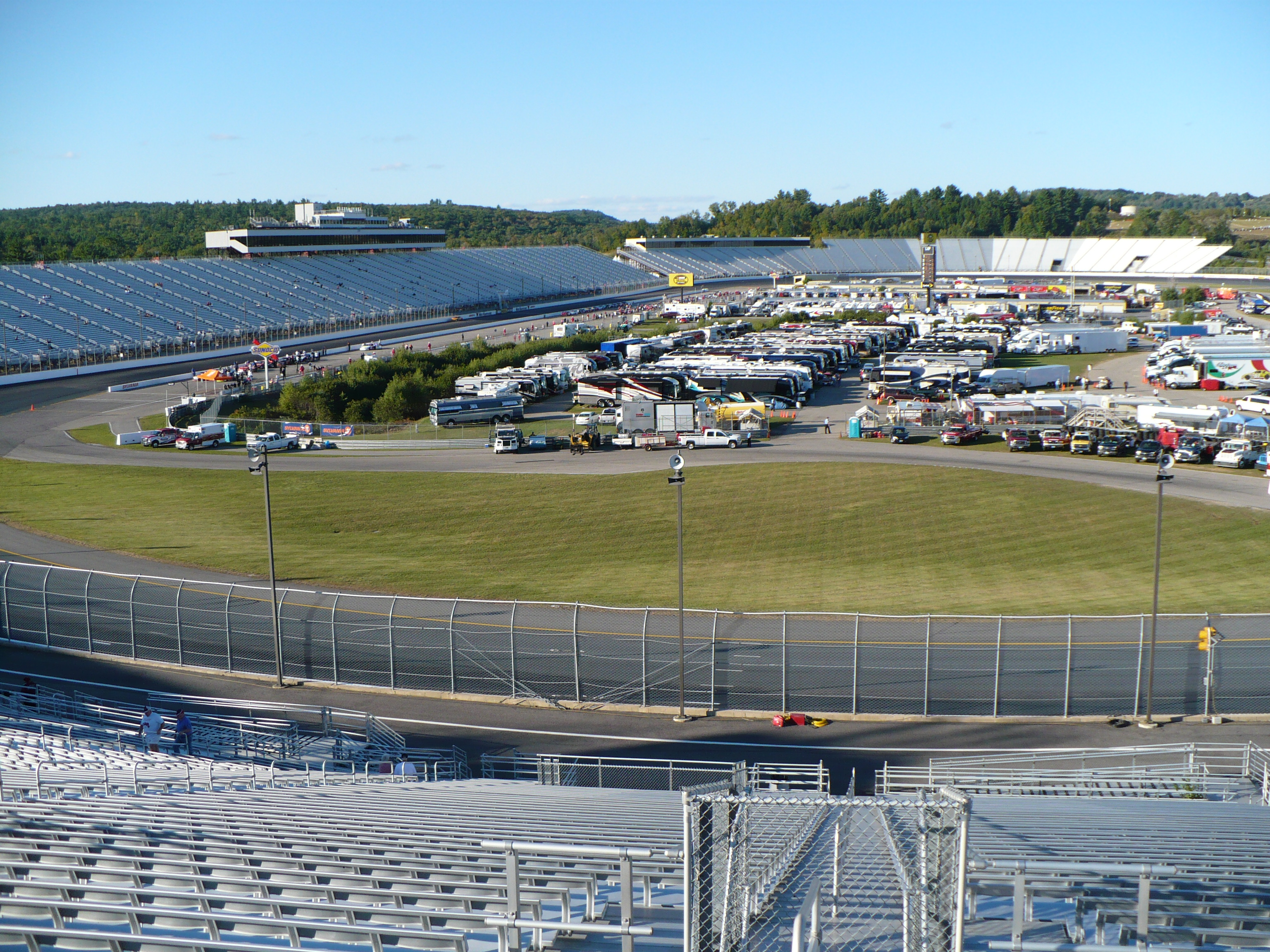
New Hampshire Motor Speedway, the track where the race will be held.

New Hampshire Motor Speedway is a 1.058-mile (1.703 km) oval speedway located in Loudon, New Hampshire, which has hosted NASCAR racing annually since the early 1990s, as well as the longest-running motorcycle race in North America, the Loudon Classic. Nicknamed "The Magic Mile", the speedway is often converted into a 1.6-mile (2.6 km) road course, which includes much of the oval.

The track was originally the site of Bryar Motorsports Park before being purchased and redeveloped by Bob Bahre. The track is currently one of eight major NASCAR tracks owned and operated by Speedway Motorsports.

==== Entry list ====
- (i) denotes driver who are ineligible for series driver points.
- (R) denotes rookie driver.

No.	Driver	Team	Manufacturer
00	Landon Cassill (i)	StarCom Racing	Chevrolet
1	Kurt Busch	Chip Ganassi Racing	Chevrolet
2	Brad Keselowski	Team Penske	Ford
3	Austin Dillon	Richard Childress Racing	Chevrolet
4	Kevin Harvick	Stewart-Haas Racing	Ford
6	Ryan Newman	Roush Fenway Racing	Ford
8	Daniel Hemric (R)	Richard Childress Racing	Chevrolet
9	Chase Elliott	Hendrick Motorsports	Chevrolet
10	Aric Almirola	Stewart-Haas Racing	Ford
11	Denny Hamlin	Joe Gibbs Racing	Toyota
12	Ryan Blaney	Team Penske	Ford
13	Ty Dillon	Germain Racing	Chevrolet
14	Clint Bowyer	Stewart-Haas Racing	Ford
15	Ross Chastain (i)	Premium Motorsports	Chevrolet
17	Ricky Stenhouse Jr.	Roush Fenway Racing	Ford
18	Kyle Busch	Joe Gibbs Racing	Toyota
19	Martin Truex Jr.	Joe Gibbs Racing	Toyota
20	Erik Jones	Joe Gibbs Racing	Toyota
21	Paul Menard	Wood Brothers Racing	Ford
22	Joey Logano	Team Penske	Ford
24	William Byron	Hendrick Motorsports	Chevrolet
27	Reed Sorenson	Premium Motorsports	Chevrolet
32	Corey LaJoie	Go Fas Racing	Ford
34	Michael McDowell	Front Row Motorsports	Ford
36	Matt Tifft (R)	Front Row Motorsports	Ford
37	Chris Buescher	JTG Daugherty Racing	Chevrolet
38	David Ragan	Front Row Motorsports	Ford
41	Daniel Suárez	Stewart-Haas Racing	Ford
42	Kyle Larson	Chip Ganassi Racing	Chevrolet
43	Bubba Wallace	Richard Petty Motorsports	Chevrolet
47	Ryan Preece (R)	JTG Daugherty Racing	Chevrolet
48	Jimmie Johnson	Hendrick Motorsports	Chevrolet
51	Andy Seuss	Petty Ware Racing	Ford
52	Austin Theriault	Rick Ware Racing	Chevrolet
77	Quin Houff	Spire Motorsports	Chevrolet
88	Alex Bowman	Hendrick Motorsports	Chevrolet
95	Matt DiBenedetto	Leavine Family Racing	Toyota
Official entry list

== First practice ==
Chase Elliott was the fastest in the first practice session with a time of 27.784 seconds and a speed of 137.086 mph (220.619 km/h).

Pos	No.	Driver	Team	Manufacturer	Time	Speed
1	9	Chase Elliott	Hendrick Motorsports	Chevrolet	27.784	137.086
2	18	Kyle Busch	Joe Gibbs Racing	Toyota	27.827	136.874
3	95	Matt DiBenedetto	Leavine Family Racing	Toyota	27.827	136.874
Official first practice results

== Qualifying ==
Brad Keselowski scored the pole for the race with a time of 27.927 and a speed of 136.384 mph (219.489 km/h).

=== Qualifying results ===
Pos	No.	Driver	Team	Manufacturer	Time
1	2	Brad Keselowski	Team Penske	Ford	27.927
2	18	Kyle Busch	Joe Gibbs Racing	Toyota	27.942
3	1	Kurt Busch	Chip Ganassi Racing	Chevrolet	27.957
4	20	Erik Jones	Joe Gibbs Racing	Toyota	27.967
5	12	Ryan Blaney	Team Penske	Ford	27.982
6	19	Martin Truex Jr.	Joe Gibbs Racing	Toyota	27.989
7	95	Matt DiBenedetto	Leavine Family Racing	Toyota	28.008
8	22	Joey Logano	Team Penske	Ford	28.028
9	10	Aric Almirola	Stewart-Haas Racing	Ford	28.030
10	48	Jimmie Johnson	Hendrick Motorsports	Chevrolet	28.038
11	17	Ricky Stenhouse Jr.	Roush Fenway Racing	Ford	28.063
12	9	Chase Elliott	Hendrick Motorsports	Chevrolet	28.066
13	41	Daniel Suárez	Stewart-Haas Racing	Ford	28.087
14	4	Kevin Harvick	Stewart-Haas Racing	Ford	28.110
15	42	Kyle Larson	Chip Ganassi Racing	Chevrolet	28.131
16	14	Clint Bowyer	Stewart-Haas Racing	Ford	28.164
17	21	Paul Menard	Wood Brothers Racing	Ford	28.302
18	13	Ty Dillon	Germain Racing	Chevrolet	28.303
19	8	Daniel Hemric (R)	Richard Childress Racing	Chevrolet	28.307
20	38	David Ragan	Front Row Motorsports	Ford	28.332
21	3	Austin Dillon	Richard Childress Racing	Chevrolet	28.367
22	24	William Byron	Hendrick Motorsports	Chevrolet	28.400
23	11	Denny Hamlin	Joe Gibbs Racing	Toyota	28.432
24	34	Michael McDowell	Front Row Motorsports	Ford	28.437
25	37	Chris Buescher	JTG Daugherty Racing	Chevrolet	28.525
26	6	Ryan Newman	Roush Fenway Racing	Ford	28.597
27	43	Bubba Wallace	Richard Petty Motorsports	Chevrolet	28.618
28	47	Ryan Preece (R)	JTG Daugherty Racing	Chevrolet	28.633
29	32	Corey LaJoie	Go Fas Racing	Ford	28.655
30	36	Matt Tifft (R)	Front Row Motorsports	Ford	28.674
31	00	Landon Cassill (i)	StarCom Racing	Chevrolet	28.848
32	15	Ross Chastain (i)	Premium Motorsports	Chevrolet	29.116
33	27	Reed Sorenson	Premium Motorsports	Chevrolet	29.405
34	77	Quin Houff	Spire Motorsports	Chevrolet	29.561
35	51	Andy Seuss	Petty Ware Racing	Ford	29.669
36	52	Austin Theriault	Rick Ware Racing	Chevrolet	30.874
37	88	Alex Bowman	Hendrick Motorsports	Chevrolet	0.000
Official qualifying results

== Practice (post-qualifying) ==
=== Second practice ===
Erik Jones was the fastest in the second practice session with a time of 28.546 seconds and a speed of 133.427 mph (214.730 km/h).

Pos	No.	Driver	Team	Manufacturer	Time	Speed
1	20	Erik Jones	Joe Gibbs Racing	Toyota	28.546	133.427
2	2	Brad Keselowski	Team Penske	Ford	28.553	133.394
3	10	Aric Almirola	Stewart-Haas Racing	Ford	28.559	133.366
Official second practice results

=== Final practice ===
Ryan Blaney was the fastest in the final practice session with a time of 28.515 seconds and a speed of 133.572 mph (214.963 km/h).

Pos	No.	Driver	Team	Manufacturer	Time	Speed
1	12	Ryan Blaney	Team Penske	Ford	28.515	133.572
2	11	Denny Hamlin	Joe Gibbs Racing	Toyota	28.589	133.226
3	18	Kyle Busch	Joe Gibbs Racing	Toyota	28.694	132.739
Official final practice results

== Race ==
=== Stage results ===
Stage One Laps: 75

Pos	No	Driver	Team	Manufacturer	Points
1	18	Kyle Busch	Joe Gibbs Racing	Toyota	10
2	20	Erik Jones	Joe Gibbs Racing	Toyota	9
3	10	Aric Almirola	Stewart-Haas Racing	Ford	8
4	14	Clint Bowyer	Stewart-Haas Racing	Ford	7
5	2	Brad Keselowski	Team Penske	Ford	6
6	19	Martin Truex Jr.	Joe Gibbs Racing	Toyota	5
7	12	Ryan Blaney	Team Penske	Ford	4
8	4	Kevin Harvick	Stewart-Haas Racing	Ford	3
9	11	Denny Hamlin	Joe Gibbs Racing	Toyota	2
10	41	Daniel Suárez	Stewart-Haas Racing	Ford	1
Official stage one results

Stage Two Laps: 75

Pos	No	Driver	Team	Manufacturer	Points
1	10	Aric Almirola	Stewart-Haas Racing	Ford	10
2	22	Joey Logano	Team Penske	Ford	9
3	6	Ryan Newman	Roush Fenway Racing	Ford	8
4	24	William Byron	Hendrick Motorsports	Chevrolet	7
5	18	Kyle Busch	Joe Gibbs Racing	Toyota	6
6	11	Denny Hamlin	Joe Gibbs Racing	Toyota	5
7	42	Kyle Larson	Chip Ganassi Racing	Chevrolet	4
8	4	Kevin Harvick	Stewart-Haas Racing	Ford	3
9	21	Paul Menard	Wood Brothers Racing	Ford	2
10	1	Kurt Busch	Chip Ganassi Racing	Chevrolet	1
Official stage two results

=== Final stage results ===
Stage Three Laps: 151

Pos	Grid	No	Driver	Team	Manufacturer	Laps	Points
1	14	4	Kevin Harvick	Stewart-Haas Racing	Ford	301	46
2	23	11	Denny Hamlin	Joe Gibbs Racing	Toyota	301	42
3	4	20	Erik Jones	Joe Gibbs Racing	Toyota	301	43
4	5	12	Ryan Blaney	Team Penske	Ford	301	37
5	7	95	Matt DiBenedetto	Leavine Family Racing	Toyota	301	32
6	6	19	Martin Truex Jr.	Joe Gibbs Racing	Toyota	301	36
7	26	6	Ryan Newman	Roush Fenway Racing	Ford	301	38
8	2	18	Kyle Busch	Joe Gibbs Racing	Toyota	301	45
9	8	22	Joey Logano	Team Penske	Ford	301	37
10	1	2	Brad Keselowski	Team Penske	Ford	301	33
11	9	10	Aric Almirola	Stewart-Haas Racing	Ford	301	44
12	22	24	William Byron	Hendrick Motorsports	Chevrolet	301	32
13	17	21	Paul Menard	Wood Brothers Racing	Ford	301	26
14	37	88	Alex Bowman	Hendrick Motorsports	Chevrolet	301	23
15	25	37	Chris Buescher	JTG Daugherty Racing	Chevrolet	301	22
16	18	13	Ty Dillon	Germain Racing	Chevrolet	301	21
17	24	34	Michael McDowell	Front Row Motorsports	Ford	301	20
18	3	1	Kurt Busch	Chip Ganassi Racing	Chevrolet	301	20
19	13	41	Daniel Suárez	Stewart-Haas Racing	Ford	300	19
20	16	14	Clint Bowyer	Stewart-Haas Racing	Ford	300	24
21	28	47	Ryan Preece (R)	JTG Daugherty Racing	Chevrolet	300	16
22	27	43	Bubba Wallace	Richard Petty Motorsports	Chevrolet	300	15
23	29	32	Corey LaJoie	Go Fas Racing	Ford	299	14
24	30	36	Matt Tifft (R)	Front Row Motorsports	Ford	299	13
25	32	15	Ross Chastain (i)	Premium Motorsports	Chevrolet	299	0
26	31	00	Landon Cassill (i)	StarCom Racing	Chevrolet	298	0
27	33	27	Reed Sorenson	Premium Motorsports	Chevrolet	294	10
28	35	51	Andy Seuss	Petty Ware Racing	Ford	291	9
29	12	9	Chase Elliott	Hendrick Motorsports	Chevrolet	290	8
30	10	48	Jimmie Johnson	Hendrick Motorsports	Chevrolet	288	7
31	34	77	Quin Houff	Spire Motorsports	Chevrolet	287	6
32	21	3	Austin Dillon	Richard Childress Racing	Chevrolet	268	5
33	15	42	Kyle Larson	Chip Ganassi Racing	Chevrolet	264	8
34	20	38	David Ragan	Front Row Motorsports	Ford	261	3
35	36	52	Austin Theriault	Rick Ware Racing	Chevrolet	185	2
36	11	17	Ricky Stenhouse Jr.	Roush Fenway Racing	Ford	135	1
37	19	8	Daniel Hemric (R)	Richard Childress Racing	Chevrolet	110	1
Official race results

=== Race statistics ===
- Lead changes: 14 among 7 different drivers
- Cautions/Laps: 9 for 48
- Red flags: 0
- Time of race: 3 hours, 3 minutes and 37 seconds
- Average speed: 104.062 miles per hour (167.472 km/h)

== Media ==
=== Television ===
NBC Sports covered the race on the television side. Rick Allen, four-time and all-time Loudon winner Jeff Burton, Steve Letarte and Dale Earnhardt Jr. called the action in the booth for the race. Dave Burns, Marty Snider and Kelli Stavast reported from pit lane during the race.

NBCSN
Booth announcers	Pit reporters
Lap-by-lap: Rick Allen; Color-commentator: Jeff Burton; Color-commentator: Steve Letarte; Color-commentator: Dale Earnhardt Jr.	Dave Burns; Marty Snider; Kelli Stavast

=== Radio ===
PRN had the radio call for the race, which was simulcast on Sirius XM NASCAR Radio. Doug Rice, Mark Garrow, and Wendy Venturini called the race from the booth when the field raced down the frontstretch. Rob Albright called the race from turns 1 & 2 and Pat Patterson called the race from turns 3 & 4. Brad Gillie, Steve Richards, Jim Noble, and Brett McMillan handled the duties on pit lane.

PRN
Booth announcers	Turn announcers	Pit reporters
Lead announcer: Doug Rice; Announcer: Mark Garrow; Announcer: Wendy Venturini	Turns 1 & 2: Rob Albright; Turns 3 & 4: Pat Patterson	Brad Gillie; Brett McMillan; Jim Noble; Steve Richards

== Standings after the race ==
Drivers' Championship standings

	Pos	Driver	Points
	1	Joey Logano	783
	2	Kyle Busch	780 (–3)
	3	Kevin Harvick	691 (–92)
1	4	Denny Hamlin	669 (–114)
1	5	Brad Keselowski	663 (–120)
	6	Martin Truex Jr.	654 (–129)
	7	Kurt Busch	638 (–145)
	8	Chase Elliott	615 (–168)
1	9	Aric Almirola	586 (–197)
1	10	Alex Bowman	577 (–206)
	11	Ryan Blaney	572 (–211)
	12	William Byron	549 (–234)
	13	Kyle Larson	519 (–264)
2	14	Erik Jones	516 (–267)
2	15	Ryan Newman	509 (–274)
2	16	Clint Bowyer	505 (–278)
Official driver's standings

Manufacturers' Championship standings

Pos	Manufacturer	Points
1	Toyota	727
2	Ford	713 (–14)
3	Chevrolet	675 (–52)

- Note: Only the first 16 positions are included for the driver standings.
- . – Driver has clinched a position in the Monster Energy NASCAR Cup Series playoffs.

Previous race: 2019 Quaker State 400	Monster Energy NASCAR Cup Series; 2019 season	Next race: 2019 Gander RV 400 (Pocono)
