= 2019 Coke Zero Sugar 400 =

Nascar race

Race details
- Race 18 of 36 in the 2019 Monster Energy NASCAR Cup Series
- Date: July 7, 2019
- Location: Daytona International Speedway in Daytona Beach, Florida
- Course: Permanent racing facility
- Course length: 2.5 miles (4.023 km)
- Distance: 127 laps, 317.5 mi (510.967 km)
- Scheduled distance: 160 laps, 400 mi (643.738 km)
- Average speed: 141.146 miles per hour (227.152 km/h)

Pole position
Driver	Joey Logano	Team Penske

Most laps led
Driver	Austin Dillon	Richard Childress Racing
- Laps: 46

Winner
No. 77	Justin Haley	Spire Motorsports

Television in the United States
- Network: NBC
- Announcers: Rick Allen, Jeff Burton, Dale Earnhardt Jr. (booth) and Steve Letarte (NBC Peacock Pitbox)
- Nielsen ratings: 3.285 million

Radio in the United States
- Radio: MRN
- Booth announcers: Alex Hayden, Jeff Striegle and Rusty Wallace
- Turn announcers: Dave Moody (1 & 2), Mike Bagley (Backstretch) and Kurt Becker (3 & 4)

The 2019 Coke Zero Sugar 400 was a Monster Energy NASCAR Cup Series race that was held on July 7, 2019 at Daytona International Speedway in Daytona Beach, Florida. Initially scheduled for 160 laps on the 2.5-mile (4.0 km) superspeedway, the race – which had been delayed from July 6 due to rain – was shortened to 127 laps, due to rain and lightning.

The eighteenth race of the 2019 Monster Energy NASCAR Cup Series season saw Justin Haley – in his third Cup Series start – take his first Cup Series victory (and the first for Spire Motorsports) as he did not pit under a yellow flag period caused by a crash that involved approximately half the field, taking the lead from Kurt Busch, and the race never restarted due to the weather.

== Report ==
=== Background ===
Daytona International Speedway, the site of the race.

The race was held at Daytona International Speedway, a race track located in Daytona Beach, Florida, United States. Since opening in 1959, the track is the home of the Daytona 500, the most prestigious race in NASCAR. In addition to NASCAR, the track also hosts races of ARCA, AMA Superbike, IMSA, SCCA, and motocross. It features multiple layouts including the primary 2.5-mile (4.0-kilometre) high speed tri-oval, a 3.56-mile (5.73-kilometre) sports car course, a 2.95-mile (4.75-kilometre) motorcycle course, and a 0.25-mile (0.40-kilometre) karting and motorcycle flat-track. The track's 180-acre (73 ha) infield includes the 29-acre (12 ha) Lake Lloyd, which has hosted powerboat racing. The speedway is owned and operated by International Speedway Corporation.

The track was built in 1959 by NASCAR founder Bill France Sr. to host racing held at the former Daytona Beach Road Course. His banked design permitted higher speeds and gave fans a better view of the cars. Lights were installed around the track in 1998 and today, it is the third-largest single lit outdoor sports facility. The speedway has been renovated three times, with the infield renovated in 2004 and the track repaved twice — in 1978 and in 2010.

On January 22, 2013, the track unveiled artist depictions of a renovated speedway. On July 5 of that year, ground was broken for a project that would remove the backstretch seating and completely redevelop the frontstretch seating. The renovation to the speedway is being worked on by Rossetti Architects. The project, named "Daytona Rising", was completed in January 2016, and it costed US $400 million, placing emphasis on improving fan experience with five expanded and redesigned fan entrances (called "injectors") as well as wider and more comfortable seating with more restrooms and concession stands. After the renovations, the track's grandstands include 101,000 permanent seats with the ability to increase permanent seating to 125,000. The project was completed before the start of Daytona Speedweeks 2016.

==== Entry list ====
- (i) denotes driver who are ineligible for series driver points.
- (R) denotes rookie driver.

No.	Driver	Team	Manufacturer
00	Landon Cassill (i)	StarCom Racing	Chevrolet
1	Kurt Busch	Chip Ganassi Racing	Chevrolet
2	Brad Keselowski	Team Penske	Ford
3	Austin Dillon	Richard Childress Racing	Chevrolet
4	Kevin Harvick	Stewart-Haas Racing	Ford
6	Ryan Newman	Roush Fenway Racing	Ford
8	Daniel Hemric (R)	Richard Childress Racing	Chevrolet
9	Chase Elliott	Hendrick Motorsports	Chevrolet
10	Aric Almirola	Stewart-Haas Racing	Ford
11	Denny Hamlin	Joe Gibbs Racing	Toyota
12	Ryan Blaney	Team Penske	Ford
13	Ty Dillon	Germain Racing	Chevrolet
14	Clint Bowyer	Stewart-Haas Racing	Ford
15	Quin Houff	Premium Motorsports	Chevrolet
17	Ricky Stenhouse Jr.	Roush Fenway Racing	Ford
18	Kyle Busch	Joe Gibbs Racing	Toyota
19	Martin Truex Jr.	Joe Gibbs Racing	Toyota
20	Erik Jones	Joe Gibbs Racing	Toyota
21	Paul Menard	Wood Brothers Racing	Ford
22	Joey Logano	Team Penske	Ford
24	William Byron	Hendrick Motorsports	Chevrolet
27	Ross Chastain (i)	Premium Motorsports	Chevrolet
32	Corey LaJoie	Go Fas Racing	Ford
34	Michael McDowell	Front Row Motorsports	Ford
36	Matt Tifft (R)	Front Row Motorsports	Ford
37	Chris Buescher	JTG Daugherty Racing	Chevrolet
38	David Ragan	Front Row Motorsports	Ford
41	Daniel Suárez	Stewart-Haas Racing	Ford
42	Kyle Larson	Chip Ganassi Racing	Chevrolet
43	Bubba Wallace	Richard Petty Motorsports	Chevrolet
47	Ryan Preece (R)	JTG Daugherty Racing	Chevrolet
48	Jimmie Johnson	Hendrick Motorsports	Chevrolet
51	B. J. McLeod (i)	Petty Ware Racing	Ford
52	J. J. Yeley	Rick Ware Racing	Ford
53	Joey Gase (i)	Rick Ware Racing	Chevrolet
62	Brendan Gaughan (i)	Beard Motorsports	Chevrolet
77	Justin Haley (i)	Spire Motorsports	Chevrolet
88	Alex Bowman	Hendrick Motorsports	Chevrolet
95	Matt DiBenedetto	Leavine Family Racing	Toyota
96	Parker Kligerman (i)	Gaunt Brothers Racing	Toyota
Official entry list

== Practice ==
=== First practice ===
Kyle Busch was the fastest in the first practice session with a time of 44.831 seconds and a speed of 200.754 mph (323.082 km/h).

Pos	No.	Driver	Team	Manufacturer	Time	Speed
1	18	Kyle Busch	Joe Gibbs Racing	Toyota	44.831	200.754
2	13	Ty Dillon	Germain Racing	Chevrolet	44.847	200.682
3	37	Chris Buescher	JTG Daugherty Racing	Chevrolet	44.857	200.638
Official first practice results

=== Final practice ===
Martin Truex Jr. was the fastest in the final practice session with a time of 43.703 seconds and a speed of 205.936 mph (331.422 km/h).

Pos	No.	Driver	Team	Manufacturer	Time	Speed
1	19	Martin Truex Jr.	Joe Gibbs Racing	Toyota	43.703	205.936
2	11	Denny Hamlin	Joe Gibbs Racing	Toyota	43.745	205.738
3	20	Erik Jones	Joe Gibbs Racing	Toyota	43.748	205.724
Official final practice results

== Qualifying ==
Qualifying for Friday was cancelled due to inclement weather and Joey Logano, the point leader, was awarded the pole as a result.

=== Starting lineup ===
Pos	No.	Driver	Team	Manufacturer
1	22	Joey Logano	Team Penske	Ford
2	18	Kyle Busch	Joe Gibbs Racing	Toyota
3	2	Brad Keselowski	Team Penske	Ford
4	4	Kevin Harvick	Stewart-Haas Racing	Ford
5	19	Martin Truex Jr.	Joe Gibbs Racing	Toyota
6	11	Denny Hamlin	Joe Gibbs Racing	Toyota
7	9	Chase Elliott	Hendrick Motorsports	Chevrolet
8	1	Kurt Busch	Chip Ganassi Racing	Chevrolet
9	88	Alex Bowman	Hendrick Motorsports	Chevrolet
10	12	Ryan Blaney	Team Penske	Ford
11	10	Aric Almirola	Stewart-Haas Racing	Ford
12	24	William Byron	Hendrick Motorsports	Chevrolet
13	42	Kyle Larson	Chip Ganassi Racing	Chevrolet
14	48	Jimmie Johnson	Hendrick Motorsports	Chevrolet
15	41	Daniel Suárez	Stewart-Haas Racing	Ford
16	14	Clint Bowyer	Stewart-Haas Racing	Ford
17	20	Erik Jones	Joe Gibbs Racing	Toyota
18	6	Ryan Newman	Roush Fenway Racing	Ford
19	17	Ricky Stenhouse Jr.	Roush Fenway Racing	Ford
20	21	Paul Menard	Wood Brothers Racing	Ford
21	3	Austin Dillon	Richard Childress Racing	Chevrolet
22	37	Chris Buescher	JTG Daugherty Racing	Chevrolet
23	13	Ty Dillon	Germain Racing	Chevrolet
24	8	Daniel Hemric (R)	Richard Childress Racing	Chevrolet
25	95	Matt DiBenedetto	Leavine Family Racing	Chevrolet
26	47	Ryan Preece (R)	JTG Daugherty Racing	Chevrolet
27	38	David Ragan	Front Row Motorsports	Ford
28	34	Michael McDowell	Front Row Motorsports	Ford
29	43	Bubba Wallace	Richard Petty Motorsports	Chevrolet
30	32	Corey LaJoie	Go Fas Racing	Ford
31	36	Matt Tifft (R)	Front Row Motorsports	Ford
32	15	Quin Houff	Premium Motorsports	Chevrolet
33	00	Landon Cassill (i)	StarCom Racing	Chevrolet
34	51	B. J. McLeod (i)	Petty Ware Racing	Ford
35	77	Justin Haley (i)	Spire Motorsports	Chevrolet
36	96	Parker Kligerman (i)	Gaunt Brothers Racing	Toyota
37	52	J. J. Yeley	Rick Ware Racing	Ford
38	27	Ross Chastain (i)	Premium Motorsports	Chevrolet
39	62	Brendan Gaughan (i)	Beard Motorsports	Chevrolet
40	53	Joey Gase (i)	Rick Ware Racing	Chevrolet
Official starting lineup

== Race ==
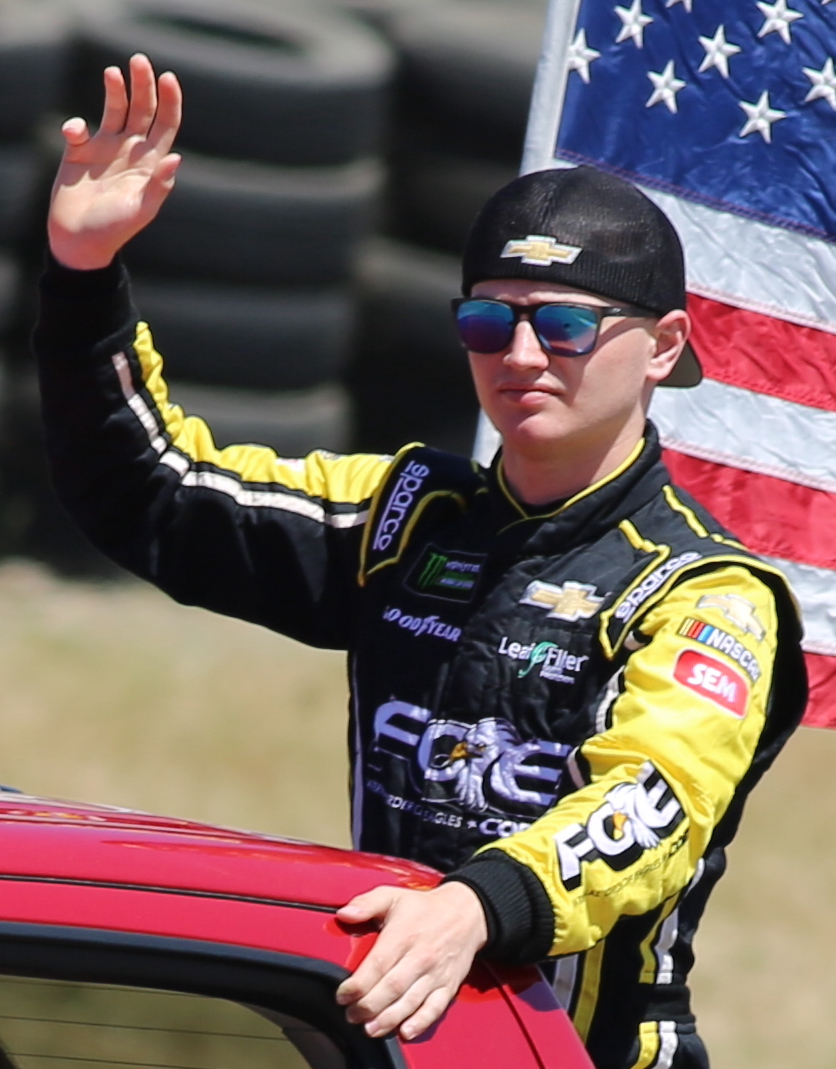
Justin Haley was declared the winner after rain shortened the race to 127 laps.

=== Stage results ===
Stage One Laps: 50

Pos	No	Driver	Team	Manufacturer	Points
1	22	Joey Logano	Team Penske	Ford	10
2	17	Ricky Stenhouse Jr.	Roush Fenway Racing	Ford	9
3	12	Ryan Blaney	Team Penske	Ford	8
4	4	Kevin Harvick	Stewart-Haas Racing	Ford	7
5	9	Chase Elliott	Hendricks Motorsports	Chevrolet	6
6	41	Daniel Suárez	Stewart-Haas Racing	Ford	5
7	14	Clint Bowyer	Stewart-Haas Racing	Ford	4
8	11	Denny Hamlin	Joe Gibbs Racing	Toyota	3
9	2	Brad Keselowski	Team Penske	Ford	2
10	19	Martin Truex Jr.	Joe Gibbs Racing	Toyota	1
Official stage one results

Stage Two Laps: 50

Pos	No	Driver	Team	Manufacturer	Points
1	3	Austin Dillon	Richard Childress Racing	Chevrolet	10
2	88	Alex Bowman	Hendrick Motorsports	Chevrolet	9
3	24	William Byron	Hendrick Motorsports	Chevrolet	8
4	9	Chase Elliott	Hendrick Motorsports	Chevrolet	7
5	14	Clint Bowyer	Stewart-Haas Racing	Ford	6
6	42	Kyle Larson	Chip Ganassi Racing	Chevrolet	5
7	48	Jimmie Johnson	Hendrick Motorsports	Chevrolet	4
8	17	Ricky Stenhouse Jr.	Roush Fenway Racing	Ford	3
9	43	Bubba Wallace	Richard Petty Motorsports	Chevrolet	2
10	22	Joey Logano	Team Penske	Ford	1
Official stage two results

=== Final stage results ===
Stage Three Laps: 27

The Big One occurred on lap 119 when Clint Bowyer and Austin Dillon battled for the lead in intense drafting packs, leading to a 17-car crash. Kurt Busch was the leader when most leaders pitted, but when at the end of Lap 127, officials gave the signal the race would restart on the ensuing lap, Busch pitted, handing the lead to Justin Haley. When lightning was detected while the cars were on the backstretch working Lap 128, the safety truck turned on its lights and immediately sent the cars to the pit lane. After two further attempts to restart the race were aborted because of lightning, more rain led NASCAR to declare the race official. NASCAR then spent considerable time to score all penalties assessed for pitting before pit lane was opened before an official result was declared, with Haley declared the winner.

Pos	Grid	No	Driver	Team	Manufacturer	Laps	Points
1	34	77	Justin Haley (i)	Spire Motorsports	Chevrolet	127	0
2	12	24	William Byron	Hendrick Motorsports	Chevrolet	127	43
3	14	48	Jimmie Johnson	Hendrick Motorsports	Chevrolet	127	38
4	23	13	Ty Dillon	Germain Racing	Chevrolet	127	33
5	18	6	Ryan Newman	Roush Fenway Racing	Ford	127	32
6	30	32	Corey LaJoie	Go Fas Racing	Ford	127	31
7	11	10	Aric Almirola	Stewart-Haas Racing	Ford	127	30
8	25	95	Matt DiBenedetto	Leavine Family Racing	Toyota	127	29
9	31	36	Matt Tifft (R)	Front Row Motorsports	Ford	127	28
10	8	1	Kurt Busch	Chip Ganassi Racing	Chevrolet	127	27
11	33	00	Landon Cassill (i)	StarCom Racing	Chevrolet	127	0
12	37	52	J. J. Yeley	Rick Ware Racing	Ford	127	25
13	28	34	Michael McDowell	Front Row Motorsports	Ford	127	24
14	2	18	Kyle Busch	Joe Gibbs Racing	Toyota	127	23
15	29	43	Bubba Wallace	Richard Petty Motorsports	Chevrolet	127	24
16	20	21	Paul Menard	Wood Brothers Racing	Ford	127	21
17	22	37	Chris Buescher	JTG Daugherty Racing	Chevrolet	127	20
18	24	8	Daniel Hemric (R)	Richard Childress Racing	Chevrolet	127	19
19	39	62	Brendan Gaughan (i)	Beard Motorsports	Chevrolet	126	0
20	13	42	Kyle Larson	Chip Ganassi Racing	Chevrolet	126	22
21	9	88	Alex Bowman	Hendrick Motorsports	Chevrolet	126	25
22	5	19	Martin Truex Jr.	Joe Gibbs Racing	Toyota	126	16
23	17	20	Erik Jones	Joe Gibbs Racing	Toyota	125	14
24	19	17	Ricky Stenhouse Jr.	Roush Fenway Racing	Ford	125	25
25	1	22	Joey Logano	Team Penske	Ford	125	23
26	6	11	Denny Hamlin	Joe Gibbs Racing	Toyota	125	14
27	40	53	Joey Gase (i)	Rick Ware Racing	Chevrolet	125	0
28	35	51	B. J. McLeod (i)	Petty Ware Racing	Ford	124	0
29	4	4	Kevin Harvick	Stewart-Haas Racing	Ford	124	15
30	38	27	Ross Chastain (i)	Premium Motorsports	Chevrolet	122	0
31	36	96	Parker Kligerman (i)	Gaunt Brothers Racing	Toyota	121	0
32	26	47	Ryan Preece (R)	JTG Daugherty Racing	Chevrolet	119	5
33	21	3	Austin Dillon	Richard Childress Racing	Chevrolet	118	14
34	16	14	Clint Bowyer	Stewart-Haas Racing	Ford	118	13
35	7	9	Chase Elliott	Hendrick Motorsports	Chevrolet	118	15
36	10	12	Ryan Blaney	Team Penske	Ford	118	9
37	32	15	Quin Houff	Premium Motorsports	Chevrolet	108	1
38	27	38	David Ragan	Front Row Motorsports	Ford	86	1
39	3	2	Brad Keselowski	Team Penske	Ford	85	3
40	15	41	Daniel Suárez	Stewart-Haas Racing	Ford	83	6
Official race results

=== Race statistics ===
- Lead changes: 24 among 14 different drivers
- Cautions/Laps: 6 for 25
- Red flags: 1
- Time of race: 2 hours, 14 minutes and 58 seconds
- Average speed: 141.146 miles per hour (227.152 km/h)

== Media ==
=== Television ===
NBC Sports covered the race, with Rick Allen, 2000 Pepsi 400 winner Jeff Burton and two-time Coke Zero 400 winner Dale Earnhardt Jr. calling the race from the broadcast booth and Steve Letarte calling from the NBC Peacock Pit Box on pit road. Dave Burns, Marty Snider and Kelli Stavast reported from pit lane during the race. During the lengthy red flag for lightning, television coverage eventually switched over to NBCSN, where the official announcement of the end of the race was made.

NBC
Booth announcers	Pit reporters
Lap-by-lap: Rick Allen; Color commentator: Jeff Burton; Color commentator: Dale Earnhardt Jr. NBC Peacock Pitbox: Steve Letarte; Guest analyst reporter Jesse Iwuji	Dave Burns; Marty Snider; Kelli Stavast

=== Radio ===
MRN had the radio call for the race which was also simulcast on SiriusXM's NASCAR Radio channel.

MRN Radio
Booth announcers	Turn announcers	Pit reporters
Lead announcer: Alex Hayden; Announcer: Jeff Striegle; Announcer: Rusty Wallace	Turns 1 & 2: Dave Moody; Backstretch: Mike Bagley; Turns 3 & 4: Kurt Becker	Winston Kelley; Kim Coon; Steve Post; Dillon Welch

== Standings after the race ==
Drivers' Championship standings

	Pos	Driver	Points
	1	Joey Logano	700
	2	Kyle Busch	682 (–18)
1	3	Kevin Harvick	625 (–75)
1	4	Brad Keselowski	613 (–87)
	5	Martin Truex Jr.	597 (–103)
	6	Denny Hamlin	588 (–112)
	7	Chase Elliott	585 (–115)
	8	Kurt Busch	564 (–136)
	9	Alex Bowman	534 (–166)
1	10	Aric Almirola	512 (–188)
1	11	Ryan Blaney	508 (–192)
	12	William Byron	498 (–202)
1	13	Jimmie Johnson	474 (–226)
1	14	Kyle Larson	473 (–227)
1	15	Clint Bowyer	444 (–256)
2	16	Ryan Newman	443 (–257)
Official driver's standings

Manufacturers' Championship standings

Pos	Manufacturer	Points
1	Toyota	657
2	Ford	642 (–15)
3	Chevrolet	610 (–47)

- Note: Only the first 16 positions are included for the driver standings.
- . – Driver has clinched a position in the Monster Energy NASCAR Cup Series playoffs.

Previous race: 2019 Camping World 400	Monster Energy NASCAR Cup Series; 2019 season	Next race: 2019 Quaker State 400
