= 2019 Gander RV 400 (Pocono) =

Race details
- Race 21 of 36 in the 2019 Monster Energy NASCAR Cup Series
- The 2019 Gander RV 400 program cover.
- Date: July 28, 2019
- Location: Pocono Raceway in Long Pond, Pennsylvania
- Course: Permanent racing facility
- Course length: 2.5 miles (4.023 km)
- Distance: 163 laps, 407.5 mi (655.808 km)
- Scheduled distance: 160 laps, 400 mi (643.738 km)
- Average speed: 133.804 miles per hour (215.337 km/h)

Pole position
Driver	Kevin Harvick	Stewart-Haas Racing
- Time: 51.707

Most laps led
Driver	Kevin Harvick	Stewart-Haas Racing
- Laps: 62

Winner
No. 11	Denny Hamlin	Joe Gibbs Racing

Television in the United States
- Network: NBCSN
- Announcers: Rick Allen, Steve Letarte (booth), Mike Bagley (Turn 1), Dale Earnhardt Jr. (Turn 2) and Jeff Burton (Turn 3)
- Nielsen ratings: 2.705 million

Radio in the United States
- Radio: MRN
- Booth announcers: Jeff Striegle and A. J. Allmendinger
- Turn announcers: Dave Moody (1), Kyle Rickey (2) and Jason Toy (3)

The 2019 Gander RV 400 was a Monster Energy NASCAR Cup Series race held on July 28, 2019, at Pocono Raceway in Long Pond, Pennsylvania. Contested over 163 laps – extended from 160 laps due to an overtime finish – on the 2.5-mile (4.0-kilometre) superspeedway, it was the 21st race of the 2019 Monster Energy NASCAR Cup Series season.

Joe Gibbs Racing driver Denny Hamlin took his third victory of the season, taking the lead from teammate Erik Jones with seventeen laps remaining, and ultimately led home Jones and Martin Truex Jr. for a 1–2–3 finish for Joe Gibbs Racing.

== Entry list ==
- (i) denotes driver who are ineligible for series driver points.
- (R) denotes rookie driver.

No.	Driver	Team	Manufacturer
00	Landon Cassill (i)	StarCom Racing	Chevrolet
1	Kurt Busch	Chip Ganassi Racing	Chevrolet
2	Brad Keselowski	Team Penske	Ford
3	Austin Dillon	Richard Childress Racing	Chevrolet
4	Kevin Harvick	Stewart-Haas Racing	Ford
6	Ryan Newman	Roush Fenway Racing	Ford
8	Daniel Hemric (R)	Richard Childress Racing	Chevrolet
9	Chase Elliott	Hendrick Motorsports	Chevrolet
10	Aric Almirola	Stewart-Haas Racing	Ford
11	Denny Hamlin	Joe Gibbs Racing	Toyota
12	Ryan Blaney	Team Penske	Ford
13	Ty Dillon	Germain Racing	Chevrolet
14	Clint Bowyer	Stewart-Haas Racing	Ford
15	Ross Chastain (i)	Premium Motorsports	Chevrolet
17	Ricky Stenhouse Jr.	Roush Fenway Racing	Ford
18	Kyle Busch	Joe Gibbs Racing	Toyota
19	Martin Truex Jr.	Joe Gibbs Racing	Toyota
20	Erik Jones	Joe Gibbs Racing	Toyota
21	Paul Menard	Wood Brothers Racing	Ford
22	Joey Logano	Team Penske	Ford
24	William Byron	Hendrick Motorsports	Chevrolet
27	Reed Sorenson	Premium Motorsports	Chevrolet
32	Corey LaJoie	Go Fas Racing	Ford
34	Michael McDowell	Front Row Motorsports	Ford
36	Matt Tifft (R)	Front Row Motorsports	Ford
37	Chris Buescher	JTG Daugherty Racing	Chevrolet
38	David Ragan	Front Row Motorsports	Ford
41	Daniel Suárez	Stewart-Haas Racing	Ford
42	Kyle Larson	Chip Ganassi Racing	Chevrolet
43	Bubba Wallace	Richard Petty Motorsports	Chevrolet
47	Ryan Preece (R)	JTG Daugherty Racing	Chevrolet
48	Jimmie Johnson	Hendrick Motorsports	Chevrolet
51	B. J. McLeod (i)	Petty Ware Racing	Ford
52	Austin Theriault	Rick Ware Racing	Ford
53	Josh Bilicki (i)	Rick Ware Racing	Chevrolet
77	Quin Houff	Spire Motorsports	Chevrolet
88	Alex Bowman	Hendrick Motorsports	Chevrolet
95	Matt DiBenedetto	Leavine Family Racing	Toyota
Official entry list

== Practice ==
=== First practice ===
Daniel Suárez was the fastest in the first practice session with a time of 52.169 seconds and a speed of 172.516 mph (277.638 km/h).

Pos	No.	Driver	Team	Manufacturer	Time	Speed
1	41	Daniel Suárez	Stewart-Haas Racing	Ford	52.169	172.516
2	24	William Byron	Hendrick Motorsports	Chevrolet	52.203	172.404
3	10	Aric Almirola	Stewart-Haas Racing	Ford	52.204	172.401
Official first practice results

=== Final practice ===
Erik Jones was the fastest in the final practice session with a time of 52.290 seconds and a speed of 172.117 mph (276.995 km/h).

Pos	No.	Driver	Team	Manufacturer	Time	Speed
1	20	Erik Jones	Joe Gibbs Racing	Toyota	52.290	172.117
2	1	Kurt Busch	Chip Ganassi Racing	Chevrolet	52.310	172.051
3	95	Matt DiBenedetto	Leavine Family Racing	Toyota	52.517	171.373
Official final practice results

== Qualifying ==
Kevin Harvick scored the pole for the race with a time of 51.707 and a speed of 174.058 mph (280.119 km/h).

=== Qualifying results ===
Pos	No.	Driver	Team	Manufacturer	Time
1	4	Kevin Harvick	Stewart-Haas Racing	Ford	51.707
2	22	Joey Logano	Team Penske	Ford	51.910
3	10	Aric Almirola	Stewart-Haas Racing	Ford	51.974
4	20	Erik Jones	Joe Gibbs Racing	Toyota	51.990
5	3	Austin Dillon (Note: Car failed post-qualifying technical inspection, and started from the rear of the field – lining up in owner points order.)	Richard Childress Racing	Chevrolet	52.126
6	48	Jimmie Johnson	Hendrick Motorsports	Chevrolet	52.148
7	18	Kyle Busch	Joe Gibbs Racing	Toyota	52.196
8	24	William Byron	Hendrick Motorsports	Chevrolet	52.213
9	1	Kurt Busch	Chip Ganassi Racing	Chevrolet	52.321
10	41	Daniel Suárez	Stewart-Haas Racing	Ford	52.346
11	19	Martin Truex Jr.	Joe Gibbs Racing	Toyota	52.365
12	11	Denny Hamlin	Joe Gibbs Racing	Toyota	52.388
13	95	Matt DiBenedetto	Leavine Family Racing	Toyota	52.436
14	2	Brad Keselowski	Team Penske	Ford	52.482
15	88	Alex Bowman	Hendrick Motorsports	Chevrolet	52.499
16	14	Clint Bowyer	Stewart-Haas Racing	Ford	52.545
17	34	Michael McDowell	Front Row Motorsports	Ford	52.597
18	17	Ricky Stenhouse Jr.	Roush Fenway Racing	Ford	52.618
19	38	David Ragan	Front Row Motorsports	Ford	52.623
20	12	Ryan Blaney	Team Penske	Ford	52.638
21	21	Paul Menard	Wood Brothers Racing	Ford	52.747
22	8	Daniel Hemric (R)	Richard Childress Racing	Chevrolet	52.800
23	9	Chase Elliott	Hendrick Motorsports	Chevrolet	52.848
24	6	Ryan Newman	Roush Fenway Racing	Ford	53.002
25	47	Ryan Preece (R)	JTG Daugherty Racing	Chevrolet	53.048
26	43	Bubba Wallace	Richard Petty Motorsports	Chevrolet	53.221
27	36	Matt Tifft (R)	Front Row Motorsports	Ford	53.255
28	37	Chris Buescher	JTG Daugherty Racing	Chevrolet	53.301
29	42	Kyle Larson	Chip Ganassi Racing	Chevrolet	53.370
30	32	Corey LaJoie	Go Fas Racing	Ford	53.417
31	00	Landon Cassill (i)	StarCom Racing	Chevrolet	53.861
32	13	Ty Dillon	Germain Racing	Chevrolet	53.979
33	53	Josh Bilicki (i)	Rick Ware Racing	Chevrolet	54.800
34	51	B. J. McLeod (i)	Petty Ware Racing	Ford	54.809
35	15	Ross Chastain (i)	Premium Motorsports	Chevrolet	54.890
36	27	Reed Sorenson	Premium Motorsports	Chevrolet	55.423
37	77	Quin Houff	Spire Motorsports	Chevrolet	55.539
38	52	Austin Theriault	Rick Ware Racing	Ford	56.011
Official qualifying results

== Race ==
=== Stage results ===
Stage One Laps: 50

Pos	No	Driver	Team	Manufacturer	Points
1	18	Kyle Busch	Joe Gibbs Racing	Toyota	10
2	22	Joey Logano	Team Penske	Ford	9
3	4	Kevin Harvick	Stewart-Haas Racing	Ford	8
4	11	Denny Hamlin	Joe Gibbs Racing	Toyota	7
5	19	Martin Truex Jr.	Joe Gibbs Racing	Toyota	6
6	42	Kyle Larson	Chip Ganassi Racing	Chevrolet	5
7	20	Erik Jones	Joe Gibbs Racing	Toyota	4
8	10	Aric Almirola	Stewart-Haas Racing	Ford	3
9	1	Kurt Busch	Chip Ganassi Racing	Chevrolet	2
10	14	Clint Bowyer	Stewart-Haas Racing	Ford	1
Official stage one results

Stage Two Laps: 50

Pos	No	Driver	Team	Manufacturer	Points
1	48	Jimmie Johnson	Hendrick Motorsports	Chevrolet	10
2	4	Kevin Harvick	Stewart-Haas Racing	Ford	9
3	22	Joey Logano	Team Penske	Ford	8
4	19	Martin Truex Jr.	Joe Gibbs Racing	Toyota	7
5	11	Denny Hamlin	Joe Gibbs Racing	Toyota	6
6	3	Austin Dillon	Richard Childress Racing	Chevrolet	5
7	20	Erik Jones	Joe Gibbs Racing	Toyota	4
8	2	Brad Keselowski	Team Penske	Ford	3
9	88	Alex Bowman	Hendrick Motorsports	Chevrolet	2
10	42	Kyle Larson	Chip Ganassi Racing	Chevrolet	1
Official stage two results

=== Final stage results ===
Stage Three Laps: 60

Pos	Grid	No	Driver	Team	Manufacturer	Laps	Points
1	9	11	Denny Hamlin	Joe Gibbs Racing	Toyota	163	53
2	4	20	Erik Jones	Joe Gibbs Racing	Toyota	163	43
3	8	19	Martin Truex Jr.	Joe Gibbs Racing	Toyota	163	47
4	31	24	William Byron	Hendrick Motorsports	Chevrolet	163	33
5	23	42	Kyle Larson	Chip Ganassi Racing	Chevrolet	163	38
6	1	4	Kevin Harvick	Stewart-Haas Racing	Ford	163	48
7	17	8	Daniel Hemric (R)	Richard Childress Racing	Chevrolet	163	30
8	11	2	Brad Keselowski	Team Penske	Ford	163	32
9	5	18	Kyle Busch	Joe Gibbs Racing	Toyota	163	38
10	30	12	Ryan Blaney	Team Penske	Ford	163	27
11	13	14	Clint Bowyer	Stewart-Haas Racing	Ford	163	27
12	3	10	Aric Almirola	Stewart-Haas Racing	Ford	163	28
13	2	22	Joey Logano	Team Penske	Ford	163	41
14	19	6	Ryan Newman	Roush Fenway Racing	Ford	163	23
15	32	48	Jimmie Johnson	Hendrick Motorsports	Chevrolet	163	32
16	33	37	Chris Buescher	JTG Daugherty Racing	Chevrolet	163	21
17	10	95	Matt DiBenedetto	Leavine Family Racing	Toyota	163	20
18	16	21	Paul Menard	Wood Brothers Racing	Ford	163	19
19	34	3	Austin Dillon	Richard Childress Racing	Chevrolet	163	23
20	12	88	Alex Bowman	Hendrick Motorsports	Chevrolet	163	19
21	14	17	Ricky Stenhouse Jr.	Roush Fenway Racing	Ford	163	16
22	21	43	Bubba Wallace	Richard Petty Motorsports	Chevrolet	163	15
23	22	36	Matt Tifft (R)	Front Row Motorsports	Ford	163	14
24	7	41	Daniel Suárez	Stewart-Haas Racing	Ford	163	13
25	35	34	Michael McDowell	Front Row Motorsports	Ford	163	12
26	36	32	Corey LaJoie	Go Fas Racing	Ford	162	11
27	6	1	Kurt Busch	Chip Ganassi Racing	Chevrolet	162	12
28	24	00	Landon Cassill (i)	StarCom Racing	Chevrolet	159	0
29	25	13	Ty Dillon	Germain Racing	Chevrolet	159	8
30	37	15	Ross Chastain (i)	Premium Motorsports	Chevrolet	159	0
31	28	77	Quin Houff	Spire Motorsports	Chevrolet	158	6
32	38	27	Reed Sorenson	Premium Motorsports	Chevrolet	158	5
33	27	51	B. J. McLeod (i)	Petty Ware Racing	Ford	158	0
34	29	52	Austin Theriault	Rick Ware Racing	Ford	157	3
35	26	53	Josh Bilicki (i)	Rick Ware Racing	Chevrolet	146	0
36	15	38	David Ragan	Front Row Motorsports	Ford	123	1
37	20	47	Ryan Preece (R)	JTG Daugherty Racing	Chevrolet	114	1
38	18	9	Chase Elliott	Hendrick Motorsports	Chevrolet	83	1
Official race results

=== Race statistics ===
- Lead changes: 9 among 5 different drivers
- Cautions/Laps: 7 for 24 laps
- Red flags: 0
- Time of race: 2 hours, 59 minutes and 22 seconds
- Average speed: 133.804 miles per hour (215.337 km/h)

== Media ==
=== Television ===
NBC Sports covered the race on the television side, with a broadcast produced similarly to their Watkins Glen International and Indianapolis Motor Speedway race broadcasts. Rick Allen and Steve Letarte called the race from the broadcast booth, with individual turn announcers calling as the drivers passed them – Motor Racing Network broadcaster Mike Bagley in turn 1, Dale Earnhardt Jr. in turn 2, and Jeff Burton in turn 3. Dave Burns, Marty Snider and Kelli Stavast reported from pit lane.

NBCSN
Booth announcers	Turn announcers	Pit reporters
Lap-by-lap: Rick Allen; Color commentator: Steve Letarte	Turn 1: Mike Bagley; Turn 2: Dale Earnhardt Jr. Turn 3: Jeff Burton	Dave Burns; Marty Snider; Kelli Stavast

=== Radio ===
Motor Racing Network covered the radio call for the race, which was simulcast on SiriusXM's NASCAR Radio channel. Jeff Striegle and A. J. Allmendinger called the race from the booth when the field raced down the front straightaway. Dave Moody called the action from turn 1, Kyle Rickey called the action when the field raced through turn 2, and Jason Toy called the action from turn 3. Winston Kelley, Steve Post, Kim Coon and Glenn Jarrett reported from pit lane.

MRN
Booth announcers	Turn announcers	Pit reporters
Lead Announcer: Jeff Striegle; Announcer: A. J. Allmendinger	Turn 1: Dave Moody; Turn 2: Kyle Rickey; Turn 3: Jason Toy	Winston Kelley; Steve Post; Kim Coon; Glenn Jarrett

== Standings after the race ==
Drivers' Championship standings

	Pos	Driver	Points
	1	Joey Logano	824
	2	Kyle Busch	818 (–6)
	3	Kevin Harvick	739 (–85)
	4	Denny Hamlin	722 (–102)
1	5	Martin Truex Jr.	701 (–123)
1	6	Brad Keselowski	695 (–129)
	7	Kurt Busch	650 (–174)
	8	Chase Elliott	616 (–208)
	9	Aric Almirola	614 (–210)
1	10	Ryan Blaney	599 (–225)
1	11	Alex Bowman	596 (–228)
	12	William Byron	582 (–242)
1	13	Erik Jones	559 (–265)
1	14	Kyle Larson	557 (–267)
1	15	Clint Bowyer	532 (–292)
1	16	Ryan Newman	532 (–292)
Official driver's standings

Manufacturers' Championship standings

Pos	Manufacturer	Points
1	Toyota	767
2	Ford	744 (–23)
3	Chevrolet	708 (–59)

- Note: Only the first 16 positions are included for the driver standings.
- . – Driver has clinched a position in the Monster Energy NASCAR Cup Series playoffs.

== Notes ==
Previous race: 2019 Foxwoods Resort Casino 301	Monster Energy NASCAR Cup Series; 2019 season	Next race: 2019 Go Bowling at The Glen
