= 2019 Quaker State 400 =

Race details
- Race 19 of 36 in the 2019 Monster Energy NASCAR Cup Series
- The 2019 Quaker State 400 program cover.
- Date: July 13, 2019
- Location: Kentucky Speedway in Sparta, Kentucky
- Course: Permanent racing facility
- Course length: 1.5 miles (2.414 km)
- Distance: 269 laps, 403.5 mi (649.370 km)
- Scheduled distance: 267 laps, 400.5 mi (644.542 km)
- Average speed: 141.070 miles per hour (227.030 km/h)

Pole position
Driver	Daniel Suárez	Stewart-Haas Racing
- Time: 29.254

Most laps led
Driver	Kyle Busch	Joe Gibbs Racing
- Laps: 72

Winner
No. 1	Kurt Busch	Chip Ganassi Racing

Television in the United States
- Network: NBCSN
- Announcers: Rick Allen, Jeff Burton, Steve Letarte and Dale Earnhardt Jr.
- Nielsen ratings: 2.075 million

Radio in the United States
- Radio: PRN
- Booth announcers: Doug Rice and Mark Garrow
- Turn announcers: Doug Turnbull (1 & 2) and Pat Patterson (3 & 4)

The 2019 Quaker State 400 presented by Walmart was a Monster Energy NASCAR Cup Series race held on July 13, 2019, at Kentucky Speedway in Sparta, Kentucky. Contested over 269 laps – extended from 267 laps due to an overtime finish – on the 1.5-mile (2.4-kilometre) speedway, it was the 19th race of the 2019 Monster Energy NASCAR Cup Series season.

On the final restart, Kurt Busch (Chip Ganassi Racing) worked the outside line to pass erstwhile leader Joey Logano (Team Penske) and his brother Kyle Busch (Joe Gibbs Racing) and held off the latter by 0.076 seconds to win the race – his first victory of the season, and his first for Chip Ganassi Racing – qualifying him for the NASCAR playoffs.

== Report ==
=== Background ===
Layout of Kentucky Speedway

Kentucky Speedway is a 1.5-mile (2.4 km) tri-oval speedway owned by Speedway Motorsports, Inc., which has also hosted the ARCA Racing Series, NASCAR Gander Outdoors Truck Series, NASCAR Xfinity Series, and the Indy Racing League, and has a grandstand seating capacity of 107,000.

==== Entry list ====
- (i) denotes driver who are ineligible for series driver points.
- (R) denotes rookie driver.

No.	Driver	Team	Manufacturer
00	Landon Cassill (i)	StarCom Racing	Chevrolet
1	Kurt Busch	Chip Ganassi Racing	Chevrolet
2	Brad Keselowski	Team Penske	Ford
3	Austin Dillon	Richard Childress Racing	Chevrolet
4	Kevin Harvick	Stewart-Haas Racing	Ford
6	Ryan Newman	Roush Fenway Racing	Ford
8	Daniel Hemric (R)	Richard Childress Racing	Chevrolet
9	Chase Elliott	Hendrick Motorsports	Chevrolet
10	Aric Almirola	Stewart-Haas Racing	Ford
11	Denny Hamlin	Joe Gibbs Racing	Toyota
12	Ryan Blaney	Team Penske	Ford
13	Ty Dillon	Germain Racing	Chevrolet
14	Clint Bowyer	Stewart-Haas Racing	Ford
15	Ross Chastain (i)	Premium Motorsports	Chevrolet
17	Ricky Stenhouse Jr.	Roush Fenway Racing	Ford
18	Kyle Busch	Joe Gibbs Racing	Toyota
19	Martin Truex Jr.	Joe Gibbs Racing	Toyota
20	Erik Jones	Joe Gibbs Racing	Toyota
21	Paul Menard	Wood Brothers Racing	Ford
22	Joey Logano	Team Penske	Ford
24	William Byron	Hendrick Motorsports	Chevrolet
32	Corey LaJoie	Go Fas Racing	Ford
34	Michael McDowell	Front Row Motorsports	Ford
36	Matt Tifft (R)	Front Row Motorsports	Ford
37	Chris Buescher	JTG Daugherty Racing	Chevrolet
38	David Ragan	Front Row Motorsports	Ford
41	Daniel Suárez	Stewart-Haas Racing	Ford
42	Kyle Larson	Chip Ganassi Racing	Chevrolet
43	Bubba Wallace	Richard Petty Motorsports	Chevrolet
47	Ryan Preece (R)	JTG Daugherty Racing	Chevrolet
48	Jimmie Johnson	Hendrick Motorsports	Chevrolet
51	Bayley Currey (i)	Petty Ware Racing	Ford
52	B. J. McLeod (i)	Rick Ware Racing	Chevrolet
77	Quin Houff	Spire Motorsports	Chevrolet
88	Alex Bowman	Hendrick Motorsports	Chevrolet
95	Matt DiBenedetto	Leavine Family Racing	Toyota
Official entry list

== Practice ==
=== First practice ===
Kurt Busch was the fastest in the first practice session with a time of 29.389 seconds and a speed of 183.742 mph (295.704 km/h).

Pos	No.	Driver	Team	Manufacturer	Time	Speed
1	1	Kurt Busch	Chip Ganassi Racing	Chevrolet	29.389	183.742
2	10	Aric Almirola	Stewart-Haas Racing	Ford	29.421	183.542
3	41	Daniel Suárez	Stewart-Haas Racing	Ford	29.492	183.101
Official first practice results

=== Final practice ===
Brad Keselowski was the fastest in the final practice session with a time of 29.621 seconds and a speed of 182.303 mph (293.388 km/h).

Pos	No.	Driver	Team	Manufacturer	Time	Speed
1	2	Brad Keselowski	Team Penske	Ford	29.621	182.303
2	4	Kevin Harvick	Stewart-Haas Racing	Ford	29.704	181.794
3	11	Denny Hamlin	Joe Gibbs Racing	Toyota	29.709	181.763
Official final practice results

== Qualifying ==
Daniel Suárez scored the pole for the race with a time of 29.254 and a speed of 184.590 mph (297.069 km/h).

=== Qualifying results ===
Pos	No.	Driver	Team	Manufacturer	Time
1	41	Daniel Suárez	Stewart-Haas Racing	Ford	29.254
2	10	Aric Almirola	Stewart-Haas Racing	Ford	29.380
3	2	Brad Keselowski	Team Penske	Ford	29.437
4	1	Kurt Busch	Chip Ganassi Racing	Chevrolet	29.451
5	4	Kevin Harvick	Stewart-Haas Racing	Ford	29.458
6	8	Daniel Hemric (R)	Richard Childress Racing	Chevrolet	29.526
7	14	Clint Bowyer	Stewart-Haas Racing	Ford	29.535
8	19	Martin Truex Jr.	Joe Gibbs Racing	Toyota	29.575
9	3	Austin Dillon	Richard Childress Racing	Chevrolet	29.580
10	18	Kyle Busch	Joe Gibbs Racing	Toyota	29.601
11	22	Joey Logano	Team Penske	Ford	29.620
12	24	William Byron	Hendrick Motorsports	Chevrolet	29.625
13	48	Jimmie Johnson	Hendrick Motorsports	Chevrolet	29.646
14	21	Paul Menard	Wood Brothers Racing	Ford	29.667
15	12	Ryan Blaney	Team Penske	Ford	29.671
16	17	Ricky Stenhouse Jr.	Roush Fenway Racing	Ford	29.686
17	34	Michael McDowell	Front Row Motorsports	Ford	29.752
18	11	Denny Hamlin	Joe Gibbs Racing	Toyota	29.763
19	42	Kyle Larson	Chip Ganassi Racing	Chevrolet	29.776
20	9	Chase Elliott	Hendrick Motorsports	Chevrolet	29.779
21	20	Erik Jones	Joe Gibbs Racing	Toyota	29.821
22	88	Alex Bowman	Hendrick Motorsports	Chevrolet	29.874
23	6	Ryan Newman (Note: The cars of Ryan Newman and Quin Houff failed post-qualifying technical inspection, and as a result, started from the rear of the field.)	Roush Fenway Racing	Ford	29.887
24	95	Matt DiBenedetto	Leavine Family Racing	Toyota	29.914
25	38	David Ragan	Front Row Motorsports	Ford	29.948
26	37	Chris Buescher	JTG Daugherty Racing	Chevrolet	29.954
27	13	Ty Dillon	Germain Racing	Chevrolet	29.985
28	43	Bubba Wallace	Richard Petty Motorsports	Chevrolet	30.008
29	32	Corey LaJoie	Go Fas Racing	Ford	30.014
30	47	Ryan Preece (R)	JTG Daugherty Racing	Chevrolet	30.023
31	36	Matt Tifft (R)	Front Row Motorsports	Ford	30.172
32	51	Bayley Currey (i)	Petty Ware Racing	Ford	30.387
33	15	Ross Chastain (i)	Premium Motorsports	Chevrolet	30.421
34	00	Landon Cassill (i)	StarCom Racing	Chevrolet	30.533
35	52	B. J. McLeod (i)	Rick Ware Racing	Chevrolet	30.964
36	77	Quin Houff	Spire Motorsports	Chevrolet	31.031
Official qualifying results

== Race ==
=== Stage results ===
Stage One Laps: 80

Pos	No	Driver	Team	Manufacturer	Points
1	1	Kurt Busch	Chip Ganassi Racing	Chevrolet	10
2	22	Joey Logano	Team Penske	Ford	9
3	18	Kyle Busch	Joe Gibbs Racing	Toyota	8
4	11	Denny Hamlin	Joe Gibbs Racing	Toyota	7
5	10	Aric Almirola	Stewart-Haas Racing	Ford	6
6	4	Kevin Harvick	Stewart-Haas Racing	Ford	5
7	17	Ricky Stenhouse Jr.	Roush Fenway Racing	Ford	4
8	19	Martin Truex Jr.	Joe Gibbs Racing	Toyota	3
9	8	Daniel Hemric (R)	Richard Childress Racing	Chevrolet	2
10	21	Paul Menard	Wood Brothers Racing	Ford	1
Official stage one results

Stage Two Laps: 80

Pos	No	Driver	Team	Manufacturer	Points
1	18	Kyle Busch	Joe Gibbs Racing	Toyota	10
2	20	Erik Jones	Joe Gibbs Racing	Toyota	9
3	3	Austin Dillon	Richard Childress Racing	Chevrolet	8
4	22	Joey Logano	Team Penske	Ford	7
5	14	Clint Bowyer	Stewart-Haas Racing	Ford	6
6	42	Kyle Larson	Chip Ganassi Racing	Chevrolet	5
7	1	Kurt Busch	Chip Ganassi Racing	Chevrolet	4
8	12	Ryan Blaney	Team Penske	Ford	3
9	21	Paul Menard	Wood Brothers Racing	Ford	2
10	10	Aric Almirola	Stewart-Haas Racing	Ford	1
Official stage two results

=== Final stage results ===
Stage Three Laps: 107

Pos	Grid	No	Driver	Team	Manufacturer	Laps	Points
1	4	1	Kurt Busch	Chip Ganassi Racing	Chevrolet	269	54
2	10	18	Kyle Busch	Joe Gibbs Racing	Toyota	269	53
3	21	20	Erik Jones	Joe Gibbs Racing	Toyota	269	43
4	19	42	Kyle Larson	Chip Ganassi Racing	Chevrolet	269	38
5	18	11	Denny Hamlin	Joe Gibbs Racing	Toyota	269	39
6	7	14	Clint Bowyer	Stewart-Haas Racing	Ford	269	37
7	11	22	Joey Logano	Team Penske	Ford	269	46
8	1	41	Daniel Suárez	Stewart-Haas Racing	Ford	269	29
9	35	6	Ryan Newman	Roush Fenway Racing	Ford	269	28
10	25	37	Chris Buescher	JTG Daugherty Racing	Chevrolet	269	27
11	14	21	Paul Menard	Wood Brothers Racing	Ford	269	29
12	16	17	Ricky Stenhouse Jr.	Roush Fenway Racing	Ford	269	29
13	15	12	Ryan Blaney	Team Penske	Ford	269	27
14	2	10	Aric Almirola	Stewart-Haas Racing	Ford	269	30
15	20	9	Chase Elliott	Hendrick Motorsports	Chevrolet	269	22
16	23	95	Matt DiBenedetto	Leavine Family Racing	Toyota	269	21
17	22	88	Alex Bowman	Hendrick Motorsports	Chevrolet	268	20
18	12	24	William Byron	Hendrick Motorsports	Chevrolet	268	19
19	8	19	Martin Truex Jr.	Joe Gibbs Racing	Toyota	268	21
20	3	2	Brad Keselowski	Team Penske	Ford	268	17
21	29	47	Ryan Preece (R)	JTG Daugherty Racing	Chevrolet	268	16
22	5	4	Kevin Harvick	Stewart-Haas Racing	Ford	268	20
23	27	43	Bubba Wallace	Richard Petty Motorsports	Chevrolet	267	14
24	6	8	Daniel Hemric (R)	Richard Childress Racing	Chevrolet	267	15
25	17	34	Michael McDowell	Front Row Motorsports	Ford	267	12
26	26	13	Ty Dillon	Germain Racing	Chevrolet	267	11
27	30	36	Matt Tifft (R)	Front Row Motorsports	Ford	267	10
28	28	32	Corey LaJoie	Go Fas Racing	Ford	266	9
29	24	38	David Ragan	Front Row Motorsports	Ford	266	8
30	13	48	Jimmie Johnson	Hendrick Motorsports	Chevrolet	266	7
31	32	15	Ross Chastain (i)	Premium Motorsports	Chevrolet	264	0
32	33	00	Landon Cassill (i)	StarCom Racing	Chevrolet	263	0
33	31	51	Bayley Currey (i)	Petty Ware Racing	Ford	262	0
34	36	77	Quin Houff	Spire Motorsports	Chevrolet	260	3
35	9	3	Austin Dillon	Richard Childress Racing	Chevrolet	238	10
36	34	52	B. J. McLeod (i)	Rick Ware Racing	Chevrolet	110	0
Official race results

=== Race statistics ===
- Lead changes: 15 among 10 different drivers
- Cautions/Laps: 7 for 35 laps
- Red flags: 0
- Time of race: 2 hours, 51 minutes and 37 seconds
- Average speed: 141.070 miles per hour (227.030 km/h)

== Media ==
=== Television ===
NBC Sports covered the race on the television side. Rick Allen, Jeff Burton, Steve Letarte and Dale Earnhardt Jr. called the race from the broadcast booth, while Dave Burns, Parker Kligerman, Marty Snider and Kelli Stavast reported from pit lane.

NBCSN
Booth announcers	Pit reporters
Lap-by-lap: Rick Allen; Color commentator: Jeff Burton; Color commentator: Steve Letarte; Color commentator: Dale Earnhardt Jr.	Dave Burns; Parker Kligerman; Marty Snider; Kelli Stavast

=== Radio ===
PRN had the radio call for the race, which was simulcast on SiriusXM's NASCAR Radio channel. Doug Rice and Mark Garrow called the action from the booth when the field raced down the front straightaway. Doug Turnbull called the action from turns 1 & 2 and Pat Patterson called the action from turns 3 & 4. Brad Gillie, Wendy Venturini, Steve Richards, and Brett McMillan reported from pit lane.

PRN
Booth announcers	Turn announcers	Pit reporters
Lead announcer: Doug Rice; Announcer: Mark Garrow	Turns 1 & 2: Doug Turnbull; Turns 3 & 4: Pat Patterson	Brad Gillie; Brett McMillan; Wendy Venturini; Steve Richards

== Standings after the race ==
Drivers' Championship standings

	Pos	Driver	Points
	1	Joey Logano	746
	2	Kyle Busch	735 (–11)
	3	Kevin Harvick	645 (–101)
	4	Brad Keselowski	630 (–116)
1	5	Denny Hamlin	627 (–119)
1	6	Martin Truex Jr.	618 (–128)
1	7	Kurt Busch	618 (–128)
1	8	Chase Elliott	607 (–139)
	9	Alex Bowman	554 (–192)
	10	Aric Almirola	542 (–204)
	11	Ryan Blaney	535 (–211)
	12	William Byron	517 (–229)
1	13	Kyle Larson	511 (–235)
1	14	Clint Bowyer	481 (–265)
2	15	Jimmie Johnson	481 (–265)
2	16	Erik Jones	473 (–273)
Official driver's standings

Manufacturers' Championship standings

Pos	Manufacturer	Points
1	Toyota	692
2	Ford	673 (–19)
3	Chevrolet	650 (–42)

- Note: Only the first 16 positions are included for the driver standings.
- . – Driver has clinched a position in the Monster Energy NASCAR Cup Series playoffs.

== Notes ==
Previous race: 2019 Coke Zero Sugar 400	Monster Energy NASCAR Cup Series; 2019 season	Next race: 2019 Foxwoods Resort Casino 301
