= Jeb Burton =

American racing driver (born 1992)

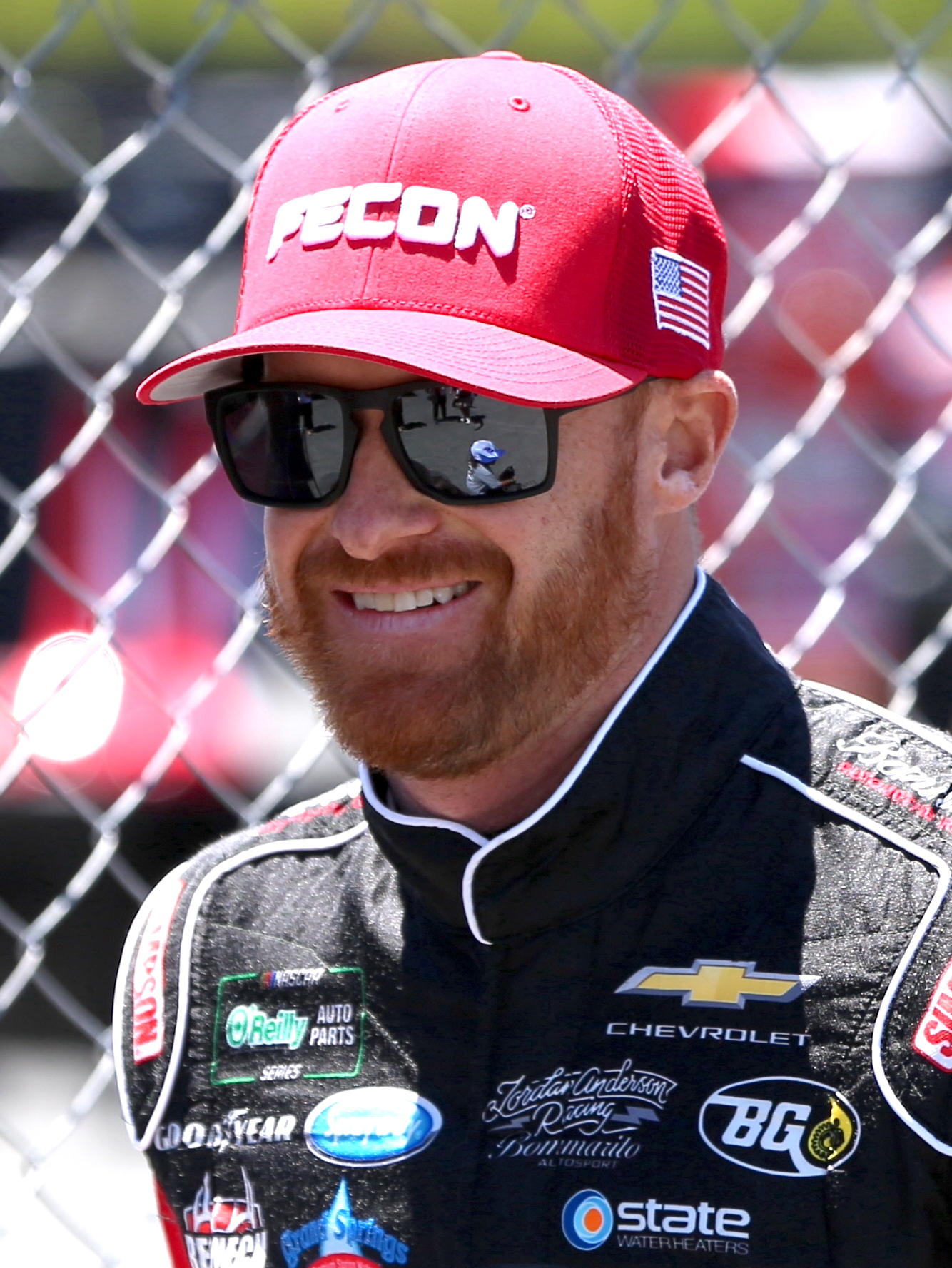
- Burton at Sonoma Raceway in 2026
- Born: John Edward Burton IV; August 6, 1992 (age 34); Halifax, Virginia, U.S.
- Height: 5 ft 10 in (1.78 m)
- Weight: 160 lb (73 kg)

NASCAR Cup Series career
- 34 races run over 5 years
- 2024 position: 62nd
- Best finish: 38th (2015)
- First race: 2015 Folds of Honor QuikTrip 500 (Atlanta)
- Last race: 2024 NASCAR Cup Series Championship Race (Phoenix)
Wins	Top tens	Poles
0	0	0

NASCAR O'Reilly Auto Parts Series career
- 241 races run over 13 years
- Car no., team: No. 22 (RSS Racing)
- 2026 position: 21st
- Best finish: 10th (2021)
- First race: 2013 Kentucky 300 (Kentucky)
- Last race: 2026 O'Reilly Auto Parts 300 (Homestead)
- First win: 2021 Ag-Pro 300 (Talladega)
- Last win: 2023 Ag-Pro 300 (Talladega)
Wins	Top tens	Poles
2	51	0

NASCAR FedEx Freight Truck Series career
- 57 races run over 8 years
- 2020 position: 87th
- Best finish: 5th (2013)
- First race: 2012 Kroger 250 (Martinsville)
- Last race: 2020 Henry Ford Health System 200 (Michigan)
- First win: 2013 WinStar World Casino 400K (Texas)
Wins	Top tens	Poles
1	21	7

NASCAR Canada Series career
- 1 race run over 1 year
- 2013 position: 49th
- Best finish: 49th (2013)
- First race: 2013 Pinty's Presents the Clarington 200 (Mosport)
Wins	Top tens	Poles
0	0	0

ARCA Menards Series career
- 2 races run over 2 years
- Best finish: 130th (2011)
- First race: 2011 Hantz Group 200 (Berlin)
- Last race: 2014 Lucas Oil 200 (Daytona)
Wins	Top tens	Poles
0	0	0
- Statistics up to date as of November 7, 2026.

John Edward "Jeb" Burton IV (born August 6, 1992) is an American professional stock car racing driver. He competes full-time in the NASCAR O'Reilly Auto Parts Series, driving the No. 22 Chevrolet Camaro SS for RSS Racing. He is the son of Ward Burton, the nephew of Jeff Burton, and the cousin of Jeff's son Harrison Burton. He competed for several seasons as a regular driver at South Boston Speedway, an American racing circuit where his family is historically known for competing, as well as at Ace Speedway. Burton has raced in each of NASCAR's three national series.

== Racing career ==
=== Early career ===
Burton started his professional racing career in the NASCAR-sanctioned Whelen All-American Series, in which drivers at local tracks compete for track championships as well as against drivers competing at other tracks for national titles, at South Boston Speedway shortly after his sixteenth birthday. He made his first start at the track, in the Limited Sportsman Series, in 2008, with his first full season of competition at the track coming in 2009; the 2009 season also saw Burton's best finish in the track's season-ending points standings, finishing fourth in the Limited Sportsman Series. Burton moved up to the track's Late Model Series in 2010, finishing 11th in the final standings, in addition to winning the track's Late Model Rookie of the Year award; he also competed in Late Models during the 2011 racing season.

In addition to competing at South Boston Speedway, where both his father and uncle made a name for themselves in their early racing careers, but where Burton, by his own admission, "struggled", Burton competed regularly at Ace Speedway, Orange County Speedway, and other racing circuits in the southern Virginia and central North Carolina areas, including at the "Daytona of Late Models", Martinsville Speedway. Burton's first Late Model win came at Ace Speedway in June 2011; he won a total of five races in Late Model competition over the course of the season at various tracks in the region.

=== Sports cars ===
In April 2009, Burton was selected as a "guest driver" to compete in the Sports Car Club of America's SCCA Pro Racing-sanctioned Volkswagen Jetta TDI Cup Series, competing on the road course at Virginia International Raceway. Burton's guest driver status left him ineligible for series points, or for winning any prize money in the event. Burton was able to qualify his vehicle, sponsored by State Water Heaters and the Ward Burton Wildlife Foundation, in the ninth position on the event's starting grid, but finished the race in 22nd; his run was marred by an on-track accident with another driver that knocked him out of competition.

=== ARCA and NASCAR ===
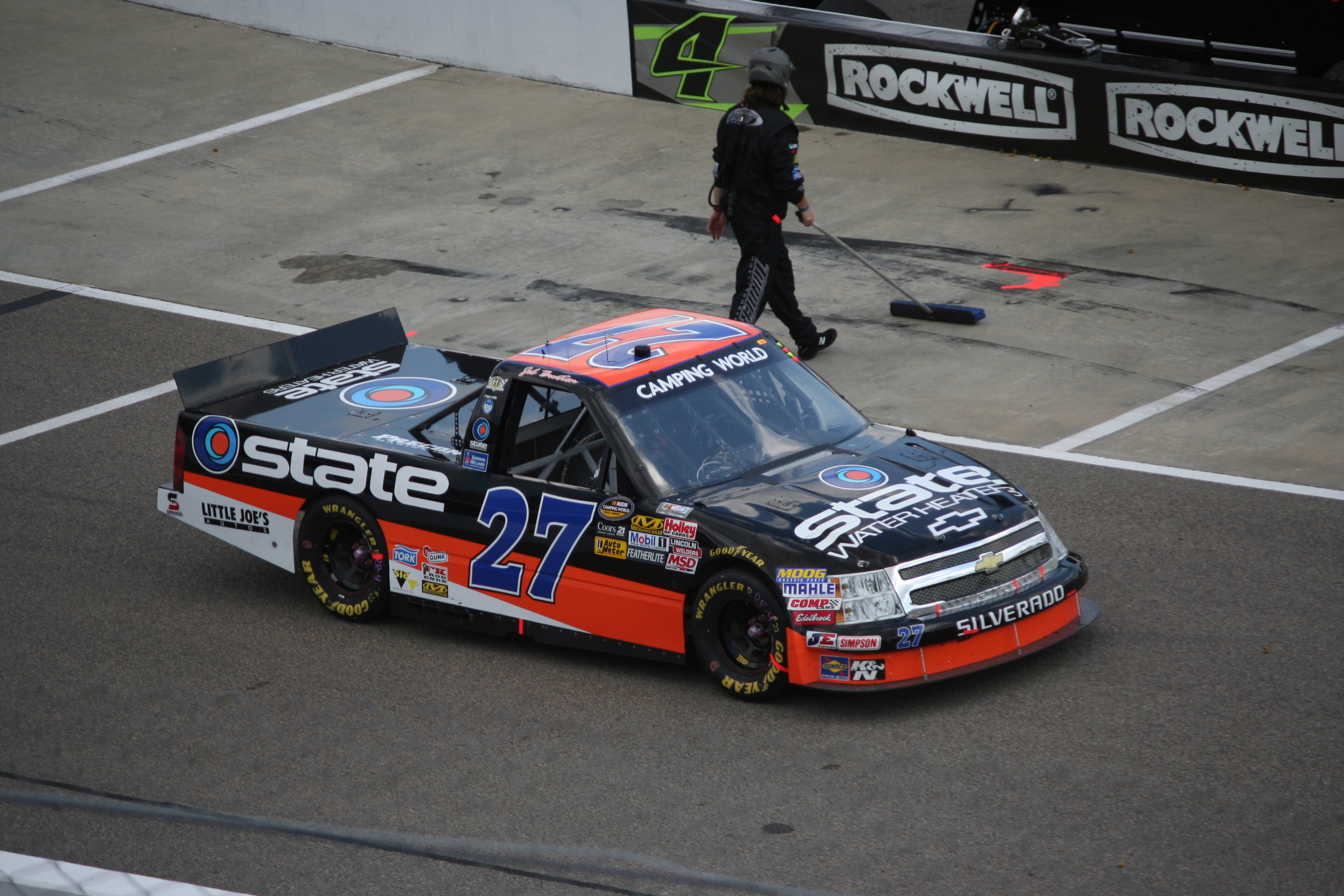
Burton's 2012 truck at Rockingham Speedway

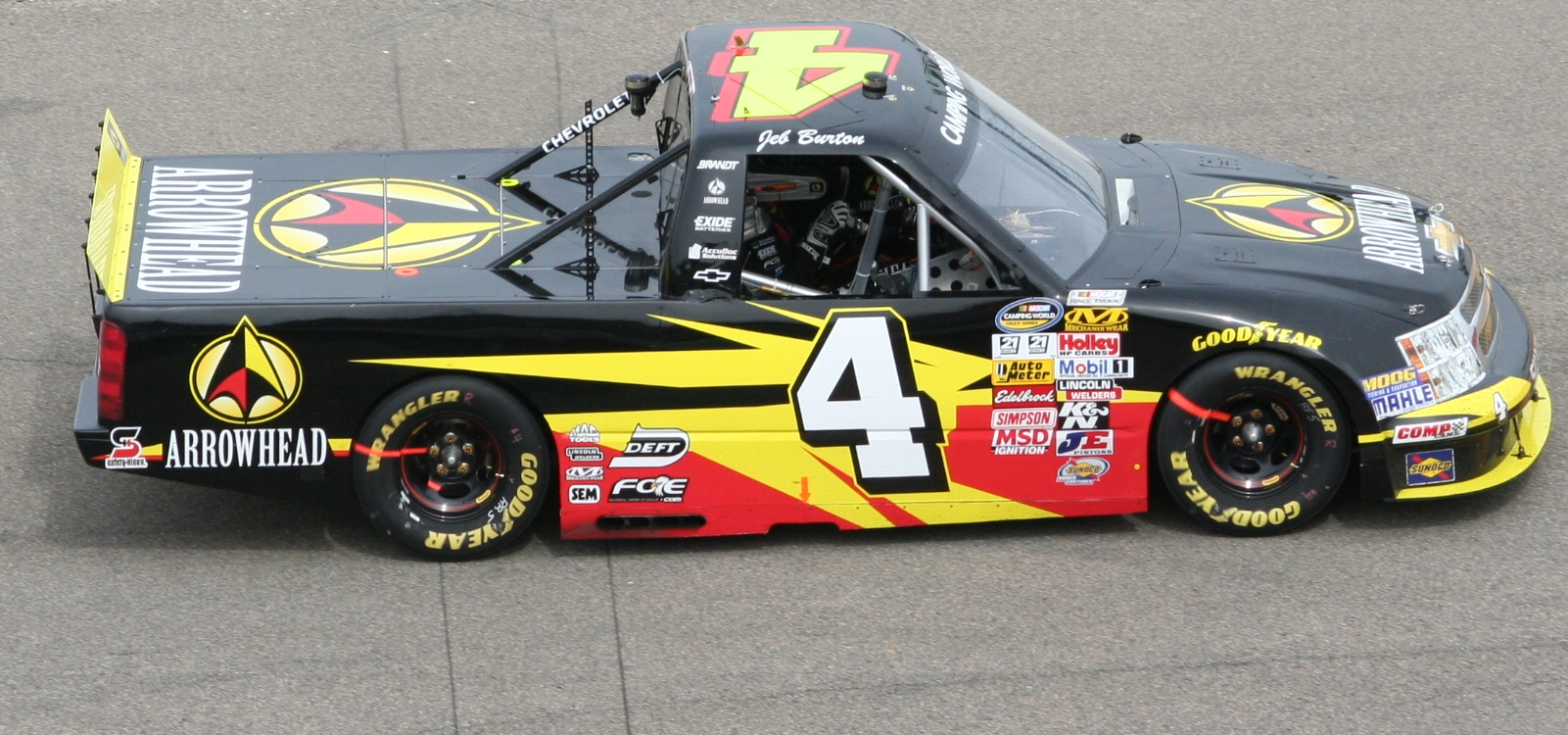
Burton's 2013 truck at Rockingham

By 2011 Burton was considered to be a rising star in the world of stock car racing. In July of that year, Burton made his debut in big-league, touring-series stock car competition, driving the No. 6 Toyota Camry for Eddie Sharp Racing in the ARCA Racing Series' Hantz Group 200 at Berlin Raceway. Burton started ninth and finished 21st in the 200-lap, 100-mile (160 km) event; he was involved in a multi-car accident on the opening lap of the race, but rallied to complete 120 of the race's 200 laps before being forced out of competition with suspension failure. Ward Burton stated that he was attempting to secure a sponsor for his son to compete in the full ARCA Racing Series season, however no deal was reached and it was the only ARCA event he would compete in during the year.

Later in the 2011 racing season, during competition in the Whelen All-American Series, Burton was briefly suspended by NASCAR, and was fined $250 USD, following an on-track incident in a heat race at South Boston Speedway. He was penalized for throwing a traffic cone at another competitor's vehicle following an accident; his father, also involved in the incident by entering the other driver's pit stall during the event, was placed on probation.

After the 2011 season, Burton desired to move up to full-time competition in a national series. In January 2012, it was announced that Burton would be competing for Hillman Racing in the NASCAR Camping World Truck Series during the 2012 racing season, sharing a ride in the No. 27 truck, a Chevrolet, with his father Ward. Due to his lack of experience on large tracks, Burton was ineligible to compete at Daytona International Speedway in the series' season-opening event; He made his debut in the series at Martinsville Speedway in the second race of the season; Trip Bruce served as the team's crew chief.

In his first series race at Martinsville Speedway, Burton, competing for Rookie of the Year in the series, finished thirteenth, on the lead lap. After the sixth race of the season at Dover International Speedway, however, Burton was forced to start skipping races due to a lack of sponsorship.

In September 2012, Burton debuted in the Rev-Oil Pro Cup Series, winning his first start in the series at Motor Mile Speedway.

==== 2013–2014: Full-time in Trucks ====
On November 21, 2012, Turner Motorsports announced the signing of Burton to a two-year contract to run a full-time Camping World Truck Series schedule and a limited Nationwide Series schedule in 2013 and 2014. Turner also announced that Burton's father, Ward Burton, had been hired to assist with driver development.

In April 2013, Burton won his first Truck Series pole at Martinsville Speedway. On June 7, 2013, Burton won the WinStar World Casino 400K at Texas Motor Speedway, his first career NASCAR win. Later in the season he made his first career start in the NASCAR Canadian Tire Series at Canadian Tire Motorsport Park in September, and his Nationwide Series debut at Kentucky Speedway later in the month.

The 2013 season was a success for Burton, as he finished fifth in the overall Camping World Truck Series standings. He totaled 731 points to finish 73 points behind the winner Matt Crafton and just one point out of fourth place. In 22 starts, he totaled one win, captured seven pole positions, and had five top-fives and eleven top-tens with only one DNF.

Before the start of the 2014 season, Turner Scott Motorsports announced that Burton's sponsor, Arrowhead Cigarettes, had defaulted on its payments and that they had been forced to close the No. 4 team, leaving Burton without a ride. In early February Burton announced that he had signed with ThorSport Racing to compete in the season-opening Truck Series and ARCA Racing Series events at Daytona International Speedway, initially on a part-time basis, but on May 27, was increased to a full-time ride. For the 2014 season, Burton finished a disappointing eighth in the overall standings, with just two top-five and seven top-ten finishes.

==== 2015: Full Cup season ====
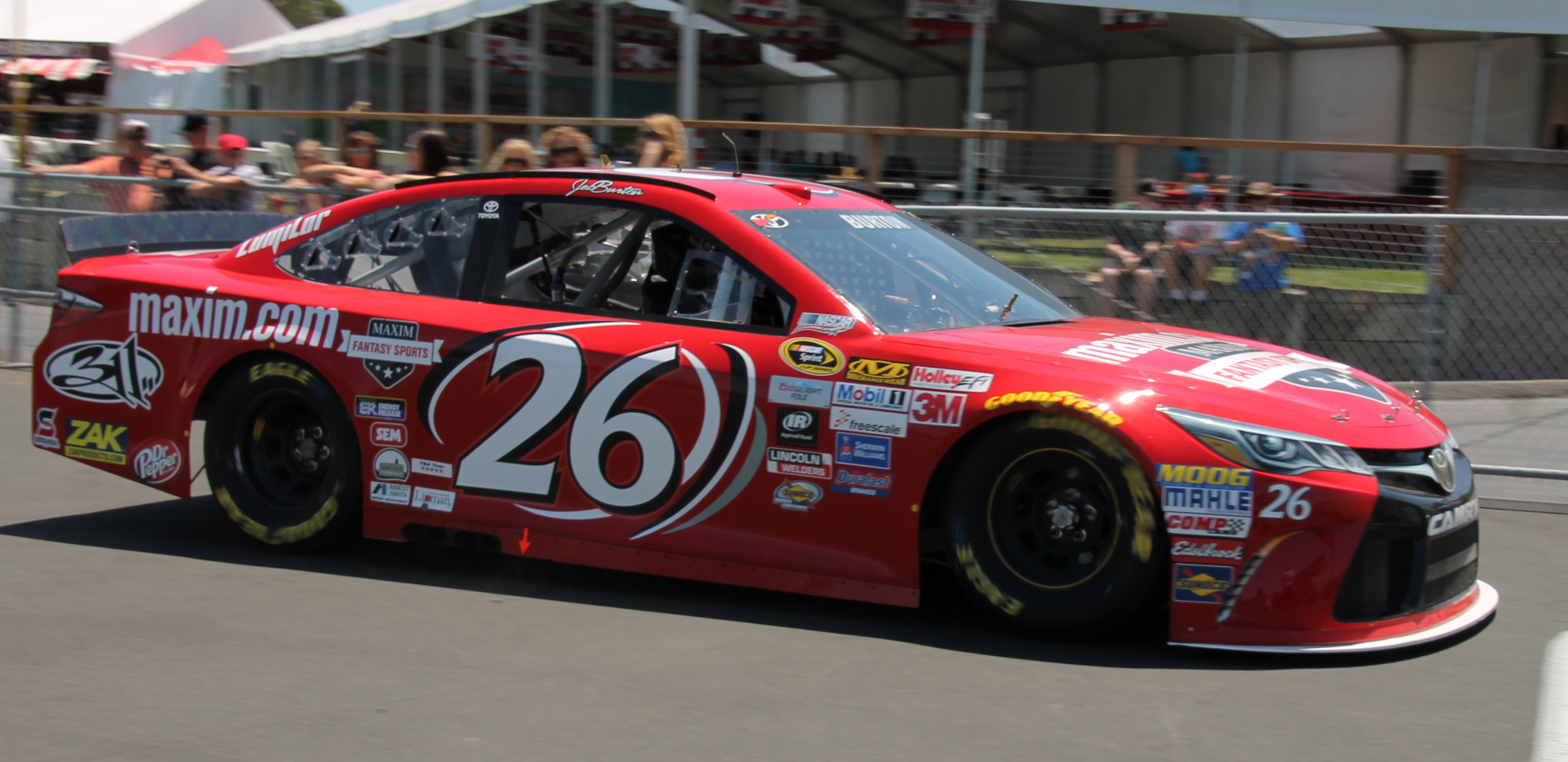
Burton in the No. 26 at the 2015 Toyota/Save Mart 350

In January, ThorSport Racing and sponsor Estes Express Lines announced that they were unable to come up with an extension to continue and the team shut down the No. 13 truck, leaving Burton without a ride. Later, however, he was signed by BK Racing to compete in the Sprint Cup Series to replace Cole Whitt, who had just left the team, in the No. 26 Toyota.

Burton drove full-time for the team in 2015 and competed for the series Rookie of the Year Award. He failed to qualify for the Daytona 500 after a wreck during the first Budweiser Duel qualifying race. However, the next week Burton qualified 40th for his first Sprint Cup race, the Folds of Honor QuikTrip 500 at Atlanta Motor Speedway. He completed the race, finishing 35th. He had his best race to that point on March 29 when he finished 29th in the STP 500 at Martinsville Speedway. However, Burton failed to qualify four times in the next six races, and crashed in his two starts in the No. 26 during this stretch, at Bristol and Kansas. Estes would ultimately renew their sponsorship of Burton beginning at Richmond; when Burton failed to qualify there, he and Estes shifted to BK's No. 23, in place of regular driver J. J. Yeley. After failing to qualify at Charlotte, Burton was able to qualify for the next eight races, before failing to qualify for the Brickyard 400. Burton would fail to qualify again at the Bristol Night Race. Before Darlington, BK Racing announced that he and Yeley would swap rides permanently, to give Burton a better shot of making races while Yeley would work to bring the No. 26 back up in the owner points (it was ranked 44th after 24 races). Burton was able to qualify for his first seven races in the No. 23; this streak came to an end at Talladega, where Burton posted the No. 23's first-ever DNQ. The next week, on the series' return at Martinsville, Burton would improve his career-best with a 27th-place finish. He would miss eight races during the season. Burton finished third in Rookie of the Year standings despite running the full season. Despite initial reports that his contract was "multi-year", Burton did not return to BK Racing in 2016.

Burton returned to the Truck Series for the fall race at Texas, driving the No. 00 for JR Motorsports.

==== 2016–2020: Part-time racing ====
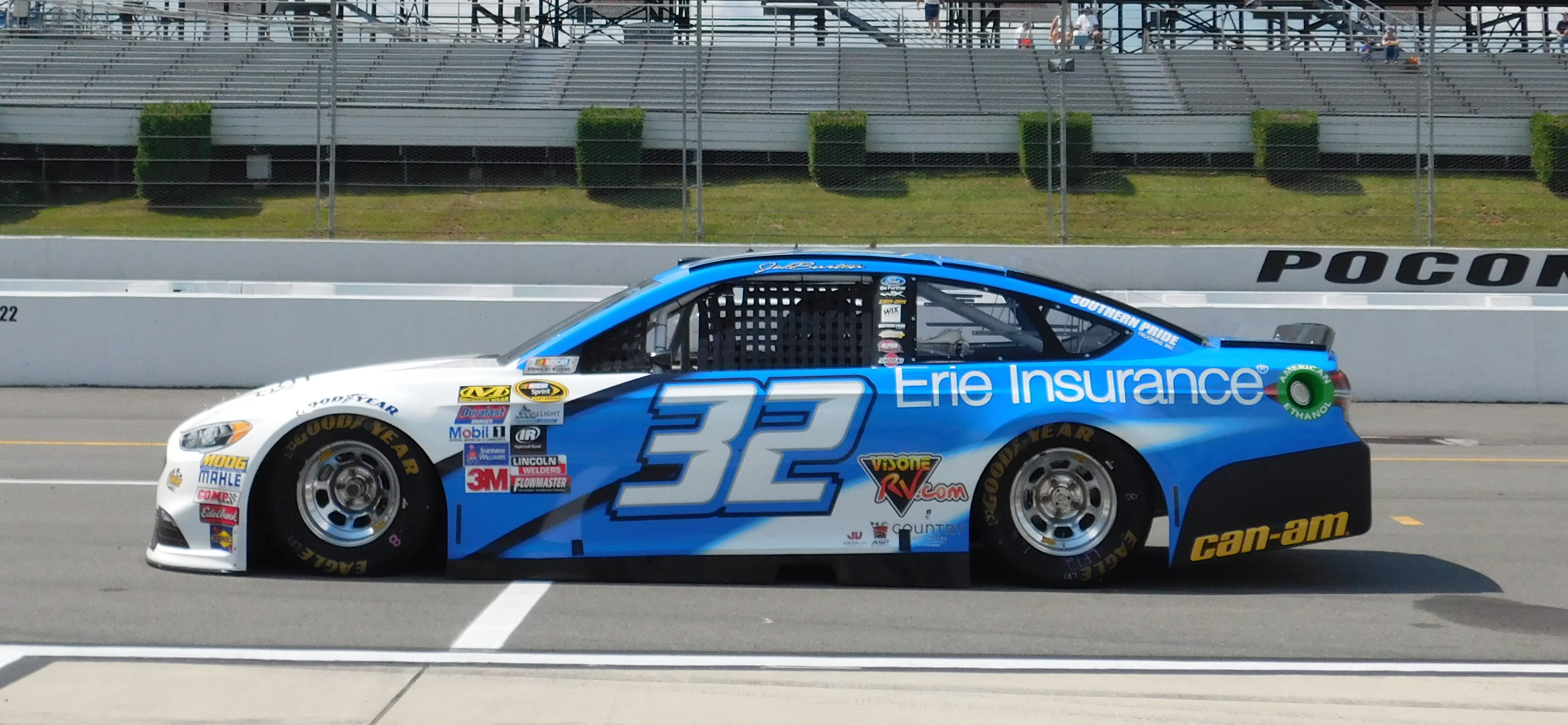
Burton's No. 32 car at Pocono Raceway in 2016

Burton joined Richard Petty Motorsports to drive the No. 43 in the Xfinity Series. In June, sponsor J. Streicher and Co. defaulted on their agreement with RPM, and the No. 43 team suspended operations. Burton returned to the Cup Series for the Axalta "We Paint Winners" 400 at Pocono, driving for Go Fas Racing. In July, Burton and Estes Express Lines joined Biagi-DenBeste Racing to compete in the Xfinity Series at Indianapolis and Richmond, driving the No. 98.

On February 24, 2017, Burton and JGL Racing announced a multi-race agreement where Burton would drive JGL's No. 24. At the Daytona July race, he scored a fourth-place finish.

In 2018, Burton partnered with Richard Childress Racing for a part-time Xfinity schedule in the No. 3 car. In October, he made his return to the Truck and Cup Series at Martinsville, driving the No. 30 Toyota truck for On Point Motorsports and the No. 51 Chevrolet for Rick Ware Racing, respectively.

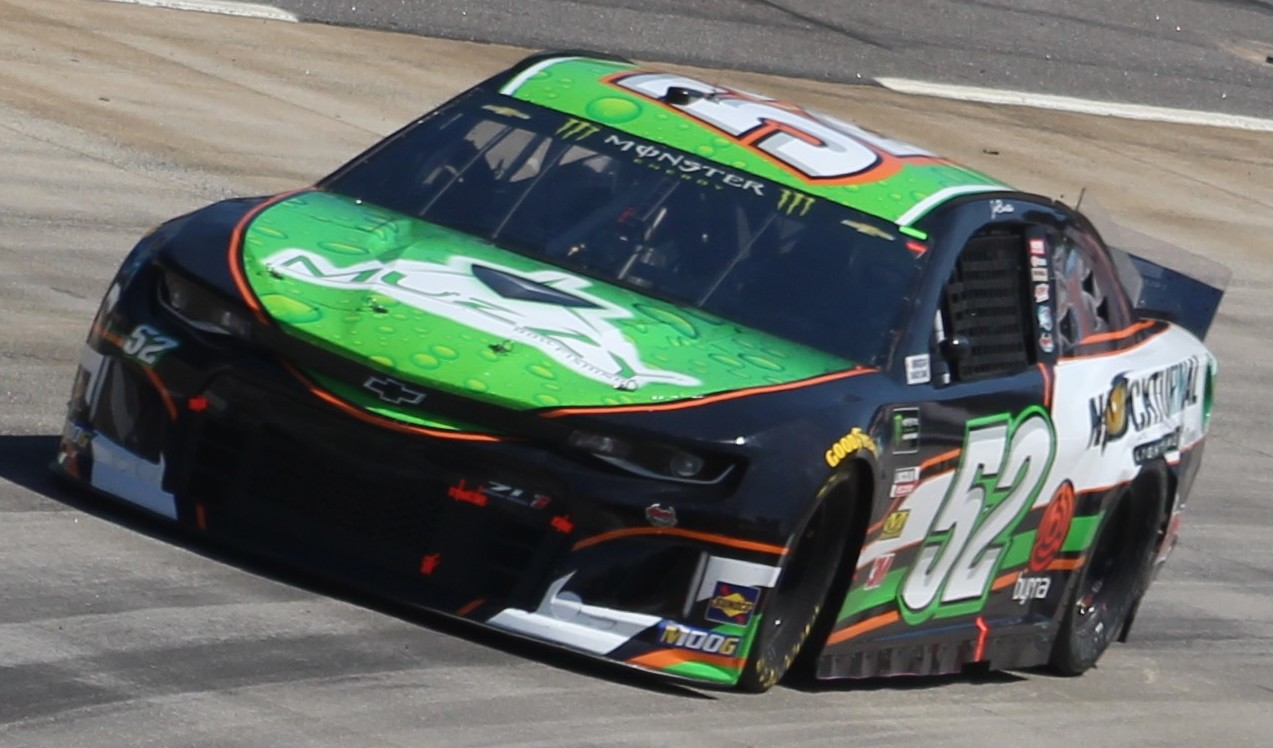
Burton's No. 52 car at Martinsville Speedway in 2019

In 2019, Burton joined JR Motorsports on a limited Xfinity slate in the No. 8 Chevrolet. He also returned to Ware and the Cup Series for the STP 500 at Martinsville. In July, he signed with Niece Motorsports to compete in the Truck race at Kentucky. During the weekend of the 2019 Lilly Diabetes 250, Burton picked up a career-best finish with JR Motorsports, finishing 4th and delivering an emotional post-race interview. He remained with JRM and the No. 8 for the 2020 season, sharing the car with Dale Earnhardt Jr. and Daniel Hemric on an 11-race schedule, while also returning to Niece on a two-race slate in the Truck Series.

==== 2021–present: Full-time in Xfinity/O'Reilly ====
After a promising partial season in which he nearly won at Richmond Raceway, scoring a series-best second, it was announced on November 16, 2020, that Burton would compete full-time in the 2021 NASCAR Xfinity Series, driving the No. 10 Camaro for Kaulig Racing. He would win his first career Xfinity Series race at Talladega on April 24, 2021, after rain stopped the race with 23 laps left and NASCAR was unable to resume it.

On December 16, 2021, it was announced that Burton would drive full-time for Our Motorsports in their new third car, the No. 27 Chevrolet, in the Xfinity Series in 2022. He lost his ride with Kaulig Racing due to sponsor Nutrien Agricultural Solutions not returning in 2022, and Landon Cassill moved over from JD Motorsports with his Voyager cryptocurrency sponsorship to replace Burton in Kaulig's No. 10.

On June 23, 2022, Burton was involved in a big crash where Ricky Stenhouse Jr. hit him, and his No. 27 was inverted, landed on its roof, but he managed to get out of the car. On October 28, Burton announced he would be leaving Our Motorsports at the end of the 2022 season. He finished sixteenth in the final standings with no top tens.

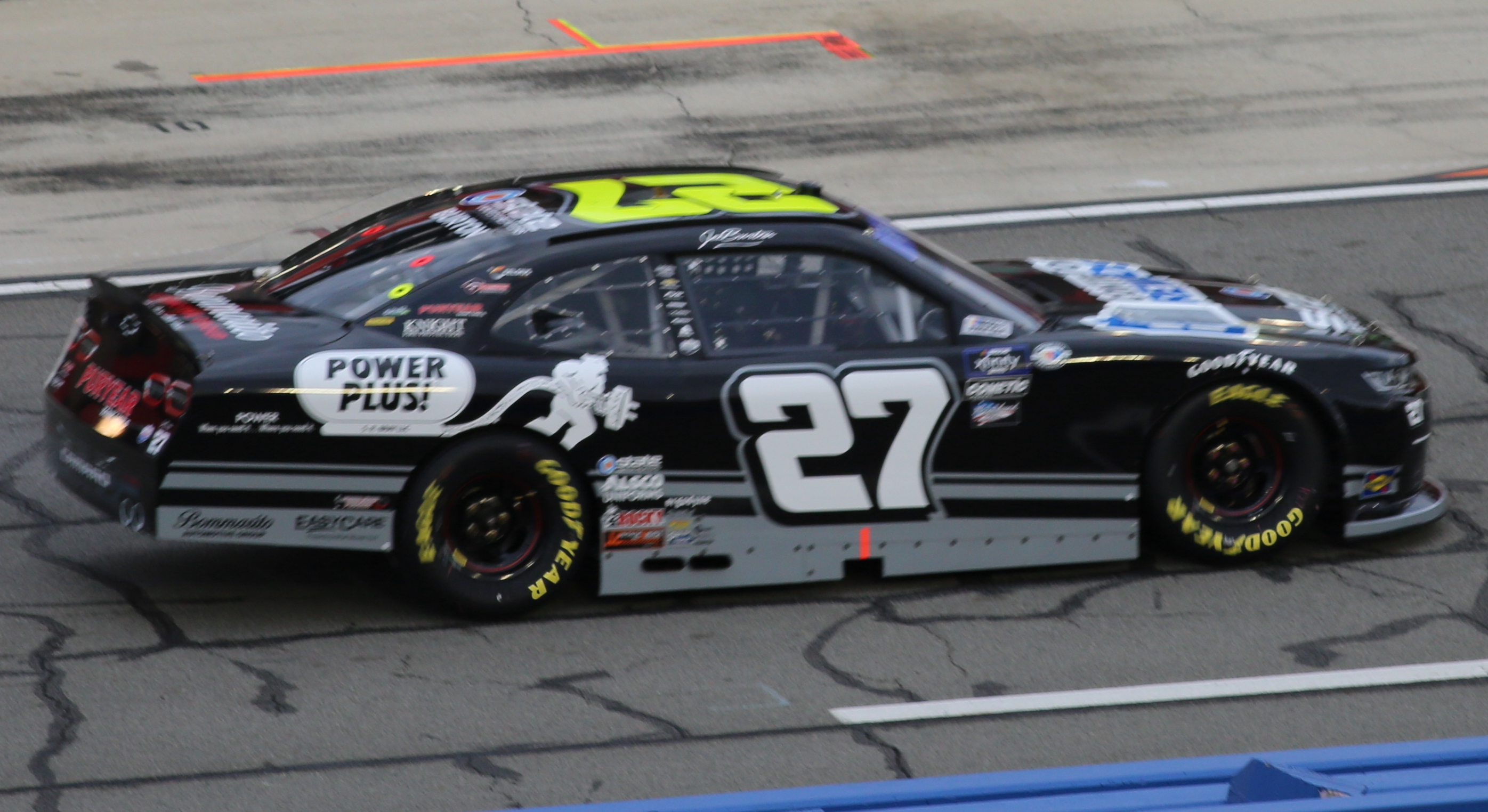
Burton at Auto Club Speedway in 2023

On January 3, 2023, it was announced that Burton would join Jordan Anderson Racing full-time in the No. 27 Chevrolet, carrying his number from Our Motorsports, driving alongside rookie teammate Parker Retzlaff in 2023. Burton started the 2023 season with an 11th place finish at Daytona. At Talladega, he scored his second career win and Jordan Anderson Racing's first victory. On August 21, it was announced that Burton will drive the No. 22 car for JAR in the Daytona August race, running a paint scheme dedicating his father's 2002 Daytona 500 victory. He was eliminated at the conclusion of the Charlotte Roval race.

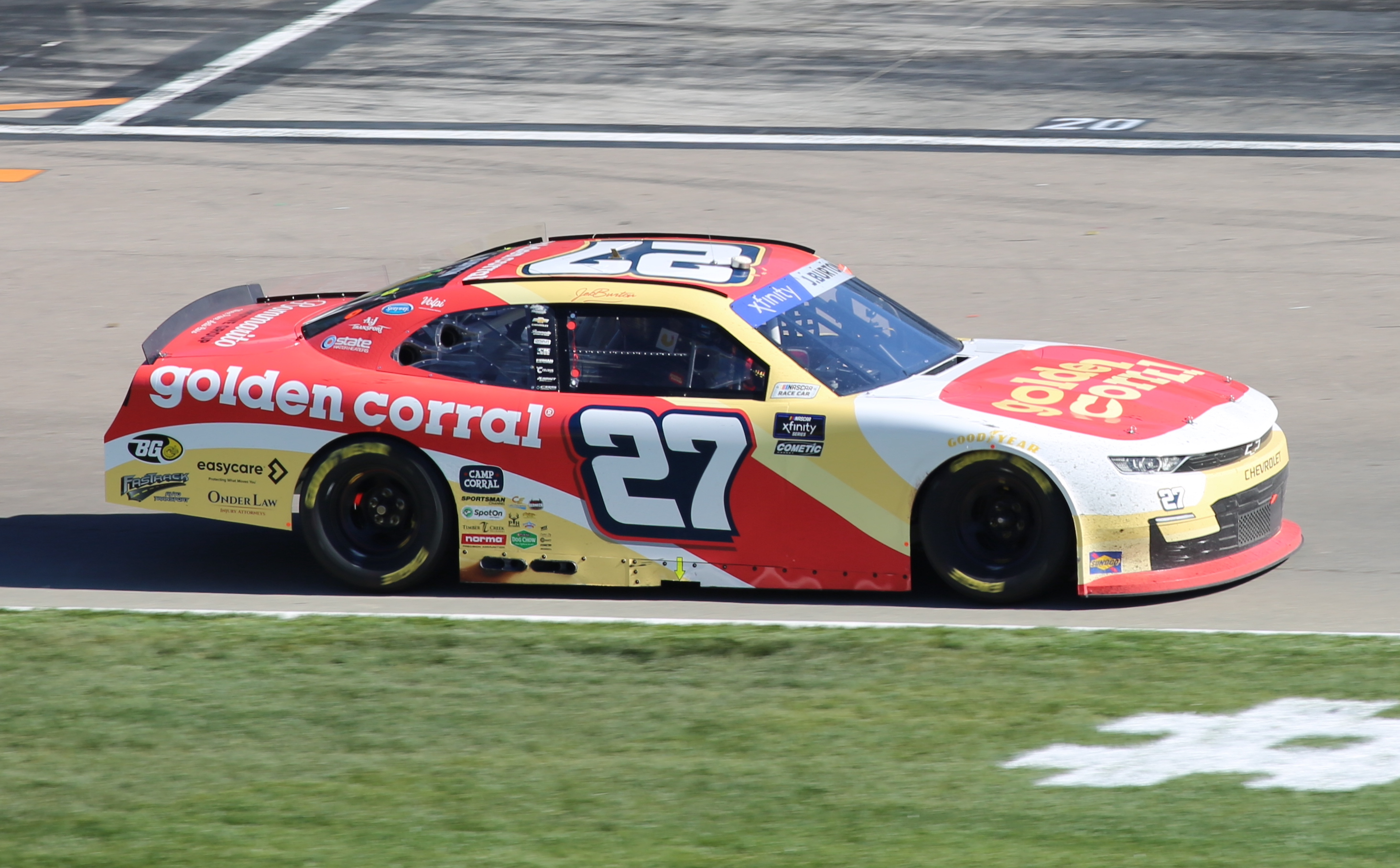
Burton's No. 27 car at Las Vegas Motor Speedway in 2025

On November 2, 2023, it was announced that Burton would return to JAR for the 2024 season. Burton finished nineteenth in points after earning only three top-ten finishes with a best finish of seventh at Talladega in October.

On October 6, 2026, Burton announced that he will move to RSS Racing in the No. 22 Chevrolet in 2027.

== Personal life ==
One of three children of Ward and Tabitha (née Throckmorton), Jeb Burton is a native of Halifax County where he graduated from Halifax County High School in 2011. Like his father, aside from racing, Jeb is an avid outdoorsman and hunter.

== Motorsports career results ==
=== Stock car career summary ===
Season	Series	Team	Races	Wins	Top 5	Top 10	Points	Position
2011	ARCA Racing Series	Eddie Sharp Racing	1	0	0	0	125	130th
2012	NASCAR Camping World Truck Series	Hillman Racing	5	0	0	1	133	36th
2013	NASCAR Canadian Tire Series	Peter Shepherd Motorsports	1	0	0	0	32	49th
2013	NASCAR Camping World Truck Series	Turner Scott Motorsports	22	1	5	11	731	5th
2013	NASCAR Nationwide Series	Turner Scott Motorsports	1	0	0	1	0	NC†
2014	ARCA Racing Series	ThorSport Racing	1	0	0	0	85	138th
2014	NASCAR Camping World Truck Series	ThorSport Racing	22	0	2	7	679	8th
2014	NASCAR Nationwide Series	Biagi-DenBeste Racing	1	0	0	0	0	NC†
2015	NASCAR Camping World Truck Series	JR Motorsports	1	0	0	0	0	NC†
2015	NASCAR Sprint Cup Series	BK Racing	28	0	0	0	216	38th
2016	CARS Late Model Stock Car Tour	Sellers-Burton Racing	1	0	0	1	25	39th
2016	NASCAR Xfinity Series	Richard Petty Motorsports	11	0	0	1	335	24th
2016	NASCAR Xfinity Series	Biagi-DenBeste Racing	3	0	0	0	335	24th
2016	NASCAR Sprint Cup Series	Go Fas Racing	2	0	0	0	0	NC†
2017	NASCAR Camping World Truck Series	Young's Motorsports	1	0	0	0	0	NC†
2017	NASCAR Xfinity Series	JGL Racing	6	0	1	1	99	38th
2018	CARS Late Model Stock Car Tour	Jeb Burton	1	0	0	0	18	58th
2018	NASCAR Camping World Truck Series	On Point Motorsports	2	0	0	0	0	NC†
2018	NASCAR Xfinity Series	Richard Childress Racing	3	0	0	0	60	47th
2018	Monster Energy NASCAR Cup Series	Rick Ware Racing	1	0	0	0	0	NC†
2019	NASCAR Gander Outdoors Truck Series	Niece Motorsports	2	0	0	2	0	NC†
2019	NASCAR Xfinity Series	JR Motorsports	7	0	2	6	201	29th
2019	Monster Energy NASCAR Cup Series	Rick Ware Racing	2	0	0	0	0	NC†
2020	NASCAR Gander Outdoors Truck Series	Niece Motorsports	2	0	0	0	0	NC†
2020	NASCAR Xfinity Series	JR Motorsports	11	0	3	6	275	28th
2021	NASCAR Xfinity Series	Kaulig Racing	33	1	7	16	2162	10th
2022	NASCAR Xfinity Series	Our Motorsports	33	0	0	0	560	16th
2023	CARS Pro Late Model Tour	N/A	1	0	0	1	48	26th
2023	NASCAR Xfinity Series	Jordan Anderson Racing	33	1	1	6	2126	12th
2024	NASCAR Xfinity Series	Jordan Anderson Racing	33	0	0	3	512	19th
2024	NASCAR Cup Series	Team AmeriVet	1	0	0	0	0	NC†
2025	NASCAR Xfinity Series	Jordan Anderson Racing	33	0	1	8	719	14th
2026	NASCAR O'Reilly Auto Parts Series	Jordan Anderson Racing	23	0	0	1	348*	21st*

=== NASCAR ===
(key) (Bold – Pole position awarded by qualifying time. Italics – Pole position earned by points standings or practice time. * – Most laps led.)

==== Cup Series ====
NASCAR Cup Series results
Year	Team	No.	Make	1	2	3	4	5	6	7	8	9	10	11	12	13	14	15	16	17	18	19	20	21	22	23	24	25	26	27	28	29	30	31	32	33	34	35	36	NCSC	Pts	Ref
2015	BK Racing	26	Toyota	DAY; DNQ	ATL; 35	LVS; 40	PHO; 34	CAL; 39	MAR; 29	TEX; DNQ	BRI; 42	RCH; DNQ	TAL; DNQ	KAN; 42	CLT; DNQ	DOV; 30	POC; 33	MCH; 37	SON; 32	DAY; 36	KEN; 41	NHA; 41	IND; DNQ	POC; 35	GLN; 39	MCH; 33	BRI; DNQ													38th	216	
2015	BK Racing	23	Toyota									RCH; 38																DAR; 31	RCH; 39	CHI; 38	NHA; 33	DOV; 43	CLT; 41	KAN; 37	TAL; DNQ	MAR; 27	TEX; 32	PHO; 39	HOM; DNQ	38th	216	
2016	Go Fas Racing	32	Ford	DAY	ATL	LVS	PHO	CAL	MAR	TEX	BRI	RCH	TAL	KAN	DOV	CLT	POC; 29	MCH	SON	DAY	KEN	NHA	IND	POC; 36	GLN	BRI	MCH	DAR	RCH	CHI	NHA	DOV	CLT	KAN	TAL	MAR	TEX	PHO	HOM	56th	0^{1}	
2018	Rick Ware Racing	51	Chevy	DAY	ATL	LVS	PHO	CAL	MAR	TEX	BRI	RCH	TAL	DOV	KAN	CLT	POC	MCH	SON	CHI	DAY	KEN	NHA	POC	GLN	MCH	BRI	DAR	IND	LVS	RCH	ROV	DOV	TAL	KAN	MAR; 33	TEX	PHO	HOM	69th	0^{1}	
2019	Rick Ware Racing	52	Chevy	DAY	ATL	LVS	PHO	CAL	MAR; 35	TEX	BRI																													60th	0^{1}	
2019	Rick Ware Racing	51	Ford									RCH; 31	TAL	DOV	KAN	CLT	POC	MCH	SON	CHI	DAY	KEN	NHA	POC	GLN	MCH	BRI	DAR	IND	LVS	RCH	ROV	DOV	TAL	KAN	MAR	TEX	PHO	HOM	60th	0^{1}	
2024	Team AmeriVet	50	Chevy	DAY	ATL	LVS	PHO	BRI	COA	RCH	MAR	TEX	TAL	DOV	KAN	DAR	CLT	GTW	SON	IOW	NHA	NSH	CSC	POC	IND	RCH	MCH	DAY	DAR	ATL	GLN	BRI	KAN	TAL	ROV	LVS	HOM	MAR	PHO; 38	62nd	0^{1}	

===== Daytona 500 =====
Year	Team	Manufacturer	Start	Finish
2015	BK Racing	Toyota	DNQ	

==== O'Reilly Auto Parts Series ====
NASCAR O'Reilly Auto Parts Series results
Year	Team	No.	Make	1	2	3	4	5	6	7	8	9	10	11	12	13	14	15	16	17	18	19	20	21	22	23	24	25	26	27	28	29	30	31	32	33	NOAPSC	Pts	Ref
2013	Turner Scott Motorsports	34	Chevy	DAY	PHO	LVS	BRI	CAL	TEX	RCH	TAL	DAR	CLT	DOV	IOW	MCH	ROA	KEN	DAY	NHA	CHI	IND	IOW	GLN	MOH	BRI	ATL	RCH	CHI	KEN; 8	DOV	KAN	CLT	TEX	PHO	HOM	107th	0^{1}	
2014	Biagi-DenBeste Racing	98	Ford	DAY	PHO	LVS	BRI	CAL	TEX	DAR	RCH	TAL	IOW	CLT; 15	DOV	MCH	ROA	KEN	DAY	NHA	CHI	IND	IOW	GLN	MOH	BRI	ATL	RCH	CHI	KEN	DOV	KAN	CLT	TEX	PHO	HOM	105th	0^{1}	
2016	Richard Petty Motorsports	43	Ford	DAY; 25	ATL; 10	LVS; 17	PHO; 17	CAL; 16	TEX; 35	BRI; 12	RCH; 19	TAL; 17	DOV; 13	CLT; 11	POC	MCH	IOW	DAY	KEN	NHA																	24th	335	
2016	Biagi-DenBeste Racing	98	Ford																		IND; 12	IOW	GLN	MOH	BRI	ROA	DAR	RCH; 19	CHI	KEN	DOV	CLT; 17	KAN	TEX	PHO	HOM	24th	335	
2017	JGL Racing	24	Toyota	DAY	ATL	LVS	PHO	CAL	TEX; 29	BRI; 26	RCH	TAL	CLT	DOV	POC	MCH	IOW	DAY; 4	KEN; 19	NHA	IND; 19	IOW	GLN	MOH	BRI; 29	ROA	DAR	RCH	CHI	KEN	DOV	CLT	KAN	TEX	PHO	HOM	38th	99	
2018	Richard Childress Racing	3	Chevy	DAY	ATL	LVS	PHO	CAL	TEX	BRI	RCH; 12	TAL	DOV; 12	CLT	POC	MCH	IOW	CHI; 34	DAY	KEN	NHA	IOW	GLN	MOH	BRI	ROA	DAR	IND	LVS	RCH	ROV	DOV	KAN	TEX	PHO	HOM	47th	60	
2019	JR Motorsports	8	Chevy	DAY	ATL	LVS	PHO	CAL	TEX; 5	BRI	RCH	TAL	DOV	CLT; 7	POC	MCH; 9	IOW	CHI	DAY	KEN	NHA	IOW	GLN	MOH	BRI; 32	ROA	DAR	IND; 4	LVS	RCH	ROV	DOV	KAN	TEX; 9	PHO	HOM; 9	29th	201	
2020	JR Motorsports	8	Chevy	DAY; 23*	LVS	CAL	PHO	DAR	CLT	BRI	ATL	HOM	HOM	TAL; 3	POC	IRC; 31	KEN; 34	KEN	TEX; 6	KAN	ROA	DRC	DOV; 7	DOV	DAY	DAR	RCH; 32	RCH; 2	BRI; 9	LVS	TAL	ROV	KAN	TEX; 30	MAR; 4	PHO	28th	275	
2021	Kaulig Racing	10	Chevy	DAY; 4	DRC; 5	HOM; 4	LVS; 10	PHO; 6	ATL; 25	MAR; 11	TAL; 1	DAR; 20	DOV; 11	COA; 10	CLT; 9	MOH; 16	TEX; 32	NSH; 7	POC; 8	ROA; 14	ATL; 2	NHA; 11	GLN; 8	IRC; 23	MCH; 29	DAY; 4	DAR; 5	RCH; 10	BRI; 24	LVS; 36	TAL; 7	ROV; 13	TEX; 11	KAN; 12	MAR; 37	PHO; 23	10th	2162	
2022	Our Motorsports	27	Chevy	DAY; 19	CAL; 14	LVS; 19	PHO; 12	ATL; 15	COA; 23	RCH; 11	MAR; 32	TAL; 15	DOV; 16	DAR; 14	TEX; 13	CLT; 12	PIR; 33	NSH; 35	ROA; 21	ATL; 13	NHA; 33	POC; 33	IRC; 38	MCH; 22	GLN; 37	DAY; 21	DAR; 24	KAN; 38	BRI; 15	TEX; 15	TAL; 17	ROV; 18	LVS; 17	HOM; 19	MAR; 11	PHO; 16	16th	560	
2023	Jordan Anderson Racing	27	Chevy	DAY; 11	CAL; 22	LVS; 14	PHO; 22	ATL; 16	COA; 21	RCH; 12	MAR; 14	TAL; 1	DOV; 18	DAR; 12	CLT; 7	PIR; 25	SON; 26	NSH; 13	CSC; 19	ATL; 13	NHA; 7	POC; 12	ROA; 12	MCH; 10	IRC; 16	GLN; 10		DAR; 18	KAN; 12	BRI; 13	TEX; 31	ROV; 34	LVS; 22	HOM; 20	MAR; 9	PHO; 12	12th	2126	
2023	Jordan Anderson Racing	22	Chevy																								DAY; 12										12th	2126	
2024	Jordan Anderson Racing	27	Chevy	DAY; 26	ATL; 23	LVS; 23	PHO; 36	COA; 30	RCH; 26	MAR; 32	TEX; 32	TAL; 9	DOV; 11	DAR; 16	CLT; 17	PIR; 37	SON; 36	IOW; 24	NHA; 17	NSH; 19	CSC; 15	POC; 21	IND; 19	MCH; 16	DAY; 17	DAR; 17	ATL; 24	GLN; 31	BRI; 25	KAN; 23	TAL; 7	ROV; 15	LVS; 24	HOM; 20	MAR; 9	PHO; 16	19th	512	
2025	Jordan Anderson Racing	27	Chevy	DAY; 16	ATL; 6	COA; 25	PHO; 15	LVS; 23	HOM; 15	MAR; 11	DAR; 15	BRI; 21	CAR; 8	TAL; 2	TEX; 10	CLT; 20	NSH; 15	MXC; 8	POC; 11	ATL; 16	CSC; 27	SON; 20	DOV; 20	IND; 15	IOW; 29	GLN; 16	DAY; 20	PIR; 7	GTW; 36	BRI; 18	KAN; 30	ROV; 6	LVS; 26	TAL; 17	MAR; 6	PHO; 38	14th	719	
2026	Jordan Anderson Racing	27	Chevy	DAY; 25	ATL; 16	COA; 18	PHO; 7	LVS; 27	DAR; 26	MAR; 30	CAR; 17	BRI; 16	KAN; 13	TAL; 25	TEX; 26	GLN; 25	DOV; 37	CLT; 22	NSH; 23	POC; 28	COR; 17	SON; 21	CHI; 20	ATL; 38	IND; 15	IOW; 27	DAY; 9	DAR; 33	GTW; 10	BRI; 25	LVS; 21	CLT; 22	PHO; 16	TAL; 11	MAR; 13	HOM; 22	21st	547	

==== Gander RV & Outdoors Truck Series ====
NASCAR Gander RV & Outdoors Truck Series results
Year	Team	No.	Make	1	2	3	4	5	6	7	8	9	10	11	12	13	14	15	16	17	18	19	20	21	22	23	NGTC	Pts	Ref
2012	Hillman Racing	27	Chevy	DAY	MAR; 13	CAR; 11	KAN; 36	CLT; 8	DOV; 19	TEX	KEN	IOW	CHI	POC	MCH	BRI	ATL	IOW	KEN	LVS	TAL	MAR	TEX	PHO	HOM		36th	133	
2013	Turner Scott Motorsports	4	Chevy	DAY; 5	**MAR**; 3*	**CAR**; 7	KAN; 15	**CLT**; 13	DOV; 9	TEX; 1	KEN; 9	IOW; 22	ELD; 18	POC; 12	**MCH**; 10*	BRI; 12	MSP; 22	IOW; 8	**CHI**; 9	LVS; 12	**TAL**; 18	MAR; 3	**TEX**; 26	PHO; 11	HOM; 3		5th	731	
2014	ThorSport Racing	13	Toyota	DAY; 7	MAR; 21	KAN; 6	CLT; 15	DOV; 18	TEX; 12	GTW; 18	KEN; 27	IOW; 14	ELD; 7	POC; 16	MCH; 8	BRI; 11	MSP; 17	CHI; 5	NHA; 12	LVS; 8	TAL; 16	MAR; 12	TEX; 2	PHO; 25	HOM; 13		8th	679	
2015	JR Motorsports	00	Chevy	DAY	ATL	MAR	KAN	CLT	DOV	TEX	GTW	IOW	KEN	ELD	POC	MCH	BRI	MSP	CHI	NHA	LVS	TAL	MAR	TEX; 16	PHO	HOM	99th	0^{1}	
2017	Young's Motorsports	20	Chevy	DAY	ATL	MAR	KAN	CLT	DOV	TEX	GTW	IOW	KEN	ELD	POC	MCH	BRI	MSP	CHI	NHA	LVS	TAL	MAR; 26	TEX	PHO	HOM	100th	0^{1}	
2018	On Point Motorsports	30	Toyota	DAY	ATL	LVS	MAR	DOV	KAN	CLT	TEX	IOW	GTW	CHI	KEN	ELD	POC	MCH	BRI	MSP	LVS	TAL	MAR; 15	TEX	PHO	HOM; 18	102nd	0^{1}	
2019	Niece Motorsports	44	Chevy	DAY	ATL	LVS	MAR	TEX	DOV	KAN	CLT	TEX	IOW	GTW	CHI	KEN; 9	POC	ELD	MCH	BRI	MSP	LVS	TAL	MAR; 9	PHO	HOM	101st	0^{1}	
2020	Niece Motorsports	44	Chevy	DAY	LVS	CLT	ATL; 16	HOM	POC	KEN	TEX	KAN	KAN	MCH; 36	DRC	DOV	GTW	DAR	RCH	BRI	LVS	TAL	KAN	TEX	MAR	PHO	87th	0^{1}	

^{*} Season still in progress
^{1} Ineligible for series points

==== Canadian Tire Series ====
NASCAR Canadian Tire Series results
Year	Team	No.	Make	1	2	3	4	5	6	7	8	9	10	11	12	NCTSC	Pts	Ref
2013	Peter Shepherd Motorsports	7	Dodge	MOS	DEL	MOS2	ICAR	MPS	SAS	ASE	CTR	RIS	MOS3; 12	BAR	KWA	49th	32	

=== ARCA Menards Series ===
(key) (Bold – Pole position awarded by qualifying time. Italics – Pole position earned by points standings or practice time. * – Most laps led.)

ARCA Menards Series results
Year	Team	No.	Make	1	2	3	4	5	6	7	8	9	10	11	12	13	14	15	16	17	18	19	20	ARSC	Pts	Ref
2011	Eddie Sharp Racing	6	Toyota	DAY	TAL	SLM	TOL	NJE	CHI	POC	MCH	WIN	BLN; 21	IOW	IRP	POC	ISF	MAD	DSF	SLM	KAN	TOL		130th	125	
2014	ThorSport Racing	13	Toyota	DAY; 29	MOB	SLM	TAL	TOL	NJE	POC	MCH	ELK	WIN	CHI	IRP	POC	BLN	ISF	MAD	DSF	SLM	KEN	KAN	138th	85	

=== CARS Late Model Stock Car Tour ===
(key) (Bold – Pole position awarded by qualifying time. Italics – Pole position earned by points standings or practice time. * – Most laps led. ** – All laps led.)

CARS Late Model Stock Car Tour results
Year	Team	No.	Make	1	2	3	4	5	6	7	8	9	10	11	12	CLMSCTC	Pts	Ref
2016	Sellers-Burton Racing	43	Ford	SNM; 8	ROU	HCY	TCM	GRE	ROU	CON	MYB	HCY	SNM			39th	25	
2018	Jeb Burton	4	Chevy	TCM	MYB	ROU	HCY	BRI	ACE; 15	CCS	KPT	HCY	WKS	ROU	SBO	58th	18	

=== CARS Pro Late Model Tour ===
(key)

CARS Pro Late Model Tour results
Year	Team	No.	Make	1	2	3	4	5	6	7	8	9	10	11	12	13	CPLMTC	Pts	Ref
2023	N/A	27B	Chevy	SNM	HCY	ACE	NWS; 7	TCM	DIL	CRW	WKS	HCY	TCM	SBO	TCM	CRW	48th	26	
