= Drew Herring =

American racing driver and spotter (born 1987)

- Born: William Andrew Herring; May 5, 1987 (age 39); Benson, North Carolina, U.S.
- Achievements: 2006 South Boston Speedway track champion 2007 Southern National Motorsports Park track champion 2006 Thunder Road 200 winner

NASCAR Cup Series career
- 1 race run over 1 year
- 2019 position: 37th
- Best finish: 37th (2019)
- First race: 2019 Ford EcoBoost 400 (Homestead)
Wins	Top tens	Poles
0	0	0

NASCAR O'Reilly Auto Parts Series career
- 22 races run over 6 years
- 2017 position: 52nd
- Best finish: 34th (2016)
- First race: 2010 U.S. Cellular 250 (Iowa)
- Last race: 2017 DC Solar 200 (Phoenix)
Wins	Top tens	Poles
0	5	2

NASCAR FedEx Freight Truck Series career
- 1 race run over 1 year
- 2012 position: 88th
- Best finish: 88th (2012)
- First race: 2012 American Ethanol 200 (Iowa)
Wins	Top tens	Poles
0	1	0

ARCA Menards Series career
- 3 races run over 2 years
- Best finish: 56th (2009)
- First race: 2009 ARCA RE/MAX Carolina 200 (Rockingham)
- Last race: 2018 Kansas ARCA 150 (Kansas)
Wins	Top tens	Poles
0	1	0
- Statistics up to date as of December 24, 2020.

William Andrew Herring (born May 5, 1987) is an American professional stock car racing driver, test driver, and spotter. He previously worked for Toyota Racing Development and Joe Gibbs Racing as a test driver, and is the spotter for Chase Briscoe and JGR's No. 19 team in the NASCAR Cup Series. As a driver, Herring last competed part-time in the Cup Series, driving the No. 96 Toyota Camry for Gaunt Brothers Racing. He has also driven in the NASCAR Xfinity and Truck Series and the ARCA Menards Series in the past.

== Racing career ==
=== Driving career ===
==== Early career ====
Herring launched into his career in 2006 when he captured the Late Model Championship at South Boston Speedway with nine wins in seventeen starts, including the inaugural Thunder Road Harley-Davidson 200. In the next year, he collected his second Late Model championship at Southern National Raceway Park with seven wins and 21 top-five finishes in 29 races.

In 2008, Herring participated in the USAR Pro Cup Series where he scored Rookie of the Year honors, with two top-five and seven top-ten finishes in fourteen starts. Herring continued in the USAR Pro Cup Series in 2009 as he earned his first series win at South Georgia Motorsports Park. He closed the season with seven top-five finishes and nine top-ten finishes in fourteen starts, finishing third in the USAR Pro Cup Series Championship and fifth in the regular season points standings. Also, Herring participated in two ARCA Racing Series races on his schedule for RBR Enterprises and posted top-twenty finishes in both of his series starts.

==== Camping World Truck Series ====
In 2012, he made his only NASCAR Camping World Truck Series start for Kyle Busch Motorsports at Iowa Speedway in September, and finished seventh.

==== Xfinity Series ====
In 2010, Herring made his debut in the Nationwide Series at Iowa Speedway for Baker-Curb Racing, and finished fifteenth, posting two top-twenty finishes in four series starts for the team. The next year, Herring joined Joe Gibbs Racing for four races (two Iowa races, Nashville, and IRP). He collected two top-ten finishes and led 39 laps. His seventh-place finish in Nashville was his best result. In 2012, he picked up his first career top-five finish in the Nationwide Series, at Kentucky Speedway in September, finishing fourth.

For the 2013 season, Herring ran six races for JGR, posting two sixth-place finishes and had only one DNF due to a crash at Bristol Motor Speedway. After not running any races in 2014, he qualified as a stand-in for JGR twice in 2015, but did not run a single race. At the same time, Herring became a Toyota Racing Development test driver, often testing experimental setups for NASCAR Cup Series cars.

==== Cup Series ====
In November 2019, Herring joined Gaunt Brothers Racing for his only Cup Series start in the 2019 Ford EcoBoost 400 at Homestead–Miami Speedway, driving the No. 96 with a special paint scheme celebrating TRD's 40th anniversary. His start later became notable due to race manipulation scheme meant to prevent his team from winning the owner's championship for the highest placed non-charter team.

=== Spotting career ===
On December 6, 2020, it was revealed that Herring would become the new spotter for Joe Gibbs Racing's No. 19 of Martin Truex Jr. in the Cup Series starting in 2021. He replaced Clayton Hughes, who left JGR for Front Row Motorsports to be the spotter for the No. 34 of Michael McDowell after the retirement of McDowell's previous spotter Rocky Ryan.

== Motorsports career results ==
=== NASCAR ===
(key) (Bold – Pole position awarded by qualifying time. Italics – Pole position earned by points standings or practice time. * – Most laps led.)

==== Monster Energy Cup Series ====
Monster Energy NASCAR Cup Series results
Year	Team	No.	Make	1	2	3	4	5	6	7	8	9	10	11	12	13	14	15	16	17	18	19	20	21	22	23	24	25	26	27	28	29	30	31	32	33	34	35	36	MENCC	Pts	Ref
2019	Gaunt Brothers Racing	96	Toyota	DAY	ATL	LVS	PHO	CAL	MAR	TEX	BRI	RCH	TAL	DOV	KAN	CLT	POC	MCH	SON	CHI	DAY	KEN	NHA	POC	GLN	MCH	BRI	DAR	IND	LVS	RCH	ROV	DOV	TAL	KAN	MAR	TEX	PHO	HOM; 29	37th	8	

==== Xfinity Series ====
NASCAR Xfinity Series results
Year	Team	No.	Make	1	2	3	4	5	6	7	8	9	10	11	12	13	14	15	16	17	18	19	20	21	22	23	24	25	26	27	28	29	30	31	32	33	34	35	NXSC	Pts	Ref
2010	Baker Curb Racing	27	Ford	DAY	CAL	LVS	BRI	NSH	PHO	TEX	TAL	RCH	DAR	DOV	CLT	NSH	KEN	ROA	NHA	DAY	CHI	GTY	IRP	IOW; 15	GLN	MCH	BRI; DNQ	CGV	ATL	RCH	DOV; 32	KAN; 28	CAL	CLT	GTY; 17	TEX	PHO	HOM	79th	376	
2011	Joe Gibbs Racing	20	Toyota	DAY	PHO	LVS	BRI	CAL	TEX	TAL	NSH	RCH	DAR	DOV	IOW; 12	CLT	CHI	MCH	ROA	DAY	KEN	NHA		IRP; 8	IOW; 11	GLN	CGV	BRI	ATL	RCH	CHI	DOV	KAN	CLT	TEX	PHO	HOM		35th	139	
2011	Joe Gibbs Racing	18	Toyota																				NSH; 7																35th	139	
2012	Kyle Busch Motorsports	54	Toyota	DAY	PHO	LVS	BRI	CAL	TEX	RCH	TAL	DAR	IOW; QL^{†}	CLT	DOV	MCH	ROA	KEN	DAY	NHA	CHI	IND	IOW	GLN	CGV	BRI	ATL	RCH	CHI										67th	41	
2012	Joe Gibbs Racing	18	Toyota																											KEN; 4	DOV	CLT	KAN	TEX	PHO	HOM			67th	41	
2013	Joe Gibbs Racing	54	Toyota	DAY	PHO	LVS	BRI	CAL	TEX	RCH	TAL	DAR	CLT	DOV	IOW; 11	MCH	ROA	KEN	DAY	NHA	CHI	IND	**IOW**; 6	GLN	MOH					KEN; 6	DOV	KAN	CLT	TEX					36th	175	
2013	Joe Gibbs Racing	18	Toyota																							BRI; 36	ATL	RCH	CHI										36th	175	
2013	Joe Gibbs Racing	20	Toyota																																PHO; 16	HOM; 15			36th	175	
2015	Joe Gibbs Racing	20	Toyota	DAY	ATL	LVS	PHO	CAL	TEX	BRI	RCH	TAL	**IOW**; QL^{‡}	CLT	DOV	MCH	CHI	DAY	KEN	NHA	IND																		-*	-*	
2015	Joe Gibbs Racing	54	Toyota																			IOW; QL^{‡}	GLN	MOH	BRI	ROA	DAR	RCH	CHI	KEN; QL^{‡}	DOV	CLT	KAN	TEX	PHO	HOM			-*	-*	
2016	JGL Racing	24	Toyota	DAY	ATL	LVS	PHO	CAL	TEX	BRI	RCH	TAL	DOV; 14	CLT; 18	POC	MCH	IOW; 29	DAY	KEN	NHA	IND																		34th	111	
2016	JGL Racing	28	Toyota																			IOW; 12	GLN	MOH	BRI	ROA	DAR	RCH	CHI	KEN									34th	111	
2016	Joe Gibbs Racing	18	Toyota																												DOV; 21	CLT	KAN	TEX	PHO	HOM			34th	111	
2017	JGL Racing	24	Toyota	DAY	ATL	LVS; 19	PHO; 20	CAL	TEX	BRI	RCH	TAL	CLT	DOV	POC	MCH	IOW	DAY	KEN	NHA	IND	IOW	GLN	MOH	BRI	ROA	DAR	RCH	CHI	KEN	DOV	CLT	KAN	TEX	PHO	HOM			52nd	35	
^{†} – Qualified for Kyle Busch . ^{‡} – Qualified for Erik Jones.

==== Camping World Truck Series ====
NASCAR Camping World Truck Series results
Year	Team	No.	Make	1	2	3	4	5	6	7	8	9	10	11	12	13	14	15	16	17	18	19	20	21	22	NCWTC	Pts	Ref
2012	Kyle Busch Motorsports	18	Toyota	DAY	MAR	CAR	KAN	CLT	DOV	TEX	KEN	IOW	CHI	POC	MCH	BRI	ATL	IOW; 7	KEN	LVS	TAL	MAR	TEX	PHO	HOM	88th	0^{1}	

^{*} Season still in progress
^{1} Ineligible for series points

=== ARCA Racing Series ===
(key) (Bold – Pole position awarded by qualifying time. Italics – Pole position earned by points standings or practice time. * – Most laps led.)

ARCA Racing Series results
Year	Team	No.	Make	1	2	3	4	5	6	7	8	9	10	11	12	13	14	15	16	17	18	19	20	21	ARSC	Pts	Ref
2009	RBR Enterprises	22	Chevy	DAY	SLM	CAR; 16	TAL	KEN	TOL	POC	MCH	MFD	IOW	KEN	BLN	POC	ISF	CHI	TOL	DSF	NJE	SLM	KAN		56th	540	
2009	RBR Enterprises	92	Chevy																					CAR; 18	56th	540	
2018	Joe Gibbs Racing	19	Toyota	DAY	NSH	SLM	TAL	TOL	CLT	POC	MCH	MAD	GTW	CHI	IOW	ELK	POC	ISF	BLN	DSF	SLM	IRP	**KAN**; 8*		75th	205	
