= 2017 DC Solar 200 =

Fourth race of the 2017 NASCAR Xfinity Series

2017 DC Solar 300
Race details
- Race 4 of 33 in the 2017 NASCAR Xfinity Series
- Date: March 18, 2017
- Official name: 13th Annual DC Solar 300
- Location: Phoenix International Raceway, Avondale, Arizona
- Course: Permanent racing facility
- Course length: 1 miles (1.6 km)
- Distance: 200 laps, 200 mi (321.868 km)
- Scheduled distance: 200 laps, 200 mi (321.868 km)
- Average speed: 91.013 miles per hour (146.471 km/h)

Pole position
Driver	William Byron	JR Motorsports
- Time: 26.969

Most laps led
Driver	Justin Allgaier	JR Motorsports
- Laps: 85

Winner
No. 7	Justin Allgaier	JR Motorsports

Television in the United States
- Network: FOX
- Announcers: Adam Alexander, Michael Waltrip, Kevin Harvick

Radio in the United States
- Radio: Motor Racing Network

The 2017 DC Solar 200 was the fourth stock car race of the 2017 NASCAR Xfinity Series season and the 13th iteration of the event. The race was held on Saturday, March 18, 2017, in Avondale, Arizona at Phoenix International Raceway, a 1-mile (1.6 km) permanent low-banked tri-oval race track. The race took the scheduled 200 laps to complete. At race's end, Justin Allgaier, driving for JR Motorsports, would pull away on the final restart with four to go to win his fourth career NASCAR Xfinity Series win and his first of the season. To fill out the podium, Ryan Blaney of Team Penske and Erik Jones of Joe Gibbs Racing would finish second and third, respectively.

== Entry list ==
#	Driver	Team	Make
00	Cole Custer (R)	Stewart–Haas Racing	Ford
0	Garrett Smithley	JD Motorsports	Chevrolet
1	Elliott Sadler	JR Motorsports	Chevrolet
01	Harrison Rhodes	JD Motorsports	Chevrolet
2	Austin Dillon (i)	Richard Childress Racing	Chevrolet
3	Ty Dillon (i)	Richard Childress Racing	Chevrolet
4	Ross Chastain	JD Motorsports	Chevrolet
5	Michael Annett	JR Motorsports	Chevrolet
6	Bubba Wallace	Roush Fenway Racing	Ford
7	Justin Allgaier	JR Motorsports	Chevrolet
07	Ray Black Jr.	SS-Green Light Racing	Chevrolet
8	Matt Mills	B. J. McLeod Motorsports	Chevrolet
9	William Byron (R)	JR Motorsports	Chevrolet
11	Blake Koch	Kaulig Racing	Chevrolet
13	Carl Long	MBM Motorsports	Toyota
14	J. J. Yeley	TriStar Motorsports	Toyota
16	Ryan Reed	Roush Fenway Racing	Ford
18	Daniel Suárez (i)	Joe Gibbs Racing	Toyota
19	Matt Tifft (R)	Joe Gibbs Racing	Toyota
20	Erik Jones (i)	Joe Gibbs Racing	Toyota
21	Daniel Hemric (R)	Richard Childress Racing	Chevrolet
22	Ryan Blaney (i)	Team Penske	Ford
23	Spencer Gallagher (R)	GMS Racing	Chevrolet
24	Drew Herring	JGL Racing	Toyota
28	Dakoda Armstrong	JGL Racing	Toyota
33	Brandon Jones	Richard Childress Racing	Chevrolet
39	Ryan Sieg	RSS Racing	Chevrolet
40	Timmy Hill	MBM Motorsports	Toyota
42	Tyler Reddick	Chip Ganassi Racing	Chevrolet
48	Brennan Poole	Chip Ganassi Racing	Chevrolet
51	Jeremy Clements	Jeremy Clements Racing	Chevrolet
52	Joey Gase	Jimmy Means Racing	Chevrolet
62	Brendan Gaughan	Richard Childress Racing	Chevrolet
74	Mike Harmon	Mike Harmon Racing	Dodge
77	Josh Bilicki*	Obaika Racing	Chevrolet
78	B. J. McLeod	B. J. McLeod Motorsports	Chevrolet
89	Morgan Shepherd	Shepherd Racing Ventures	Chevrolet
90	Mario Gosselin	DGM Racing	Chevrolet
93	Jordan Anderson (i)	RSS Racing	Chevrolet
97	Stephen Leicht	Obaika Racing	Chevrolet
99	David Starr	BJMM with SS-Green Light Racing	Chevrolet
Official entry list

*Withdrew due to fellow driver B. J. McLeod convincing Bilicki that the car was a safety hazard and should not be run.

== Practice ==
=== First practice ===
The first practice session was held on Friday, March 17, at 10:00 AM PST and lasted for 55 minutes. Erik Jones of Joe Gibbs Racing set the fastest time in the session, with a lap of 27.372 and an average speed of 131.521 miles per hour (211.663 km/h).

Pos	#	Driver	Team	Make	Time	Speed
1	20	Erik Jones (i)	Joe Gibbs Racing	Toyota	27.372	131.521
2	22	Ryan Blaney (i)	Team Penske	Ford	27.407	131.353
3	9	William Byron (R)	JR Motorsports	Chevrolet	27.417	131.305
Full first practice results

=== Second practice ===
The second practice session was held on Friday, March 17, at 1:00 PM PST and lasted for 55 minutes. Ryan Blaney of Team Penske set the fastest time in the session, with a lap of 27.423 and an average speed of 131.277 miles per hour (211.270 km/h).

Pos	#	Driver	Team	Make	Time	Speed
1	22	Ryan Blaney (i)	Team Penske	Ford	27.423	131.277
2	20	Erik Jones (i)	Joe Gibbs Racing	Toyota	27.546	130.690
3	9	William Byron (R)	JR Motorsports	Chevrolet	27.547	130.686
Full second practice results

=== Final practice ===
The final practice session was held on Friday, March 17, at 3:00 PM PST, and lasted for 55 minutes. Brendan Gaughan of Richard Childress Racing set the fastest time in the session, with a lap of 27.449 and an average speed of 131.152 miles per hour (211.069 km/h).

Pos	#	Driver	Team	Make	Time	Speed
1	62	Brendan Gaughan	Richard Childress Racing	Chevrolet	27.449	131.152
2	22	Ryan Blaney (i)	Team Penske	Ford	27.455	131.124
3	9	William Byron (R)	JR Motorsports	Chevrolet	27.477	131.019
Full Happy Hour practice results

== Qualifying ==
Qualifying would take place on Saturday, March 18, at 10:05 AM PST. Since Phoenix International Raceway is under 2 miles (3.2 km), the qualifying system was a multi-car system that included three rounds. The first round was 15 minutes, where every driver would be able to set a lap within the 15 minutes. Then, the second round would consist of the fastest 24 cars in Round 1, and drivers would have 10 minutes to set a lap. Round 3 consisted of the fastest 12 drivers from Round 2, and the drivers would have 5 minutes to set a time. Whoever was fastest in Round 3 would win the pole.

William Byron of JR Motorsports would win the pole after advancing from both preliminary rounds and setting the fastest lap in Round 3, with a time of 26.969 and an average speed of 133.487 miles per hour (214.827 km/h).

No drivers would fail to qualify.

=== Full qualifying results ===
Pos	#	Driver	Team	Make	Time (R1)	Speed (R1)	Time (R2)	Speed (R2)	Time (R3)	Speed (R3)
1	9	William Byron (R)	JR Motorsports	Chevrolet	27.306	131.839	27.160	132.548	26.969	133.487
2	20	Erik Jones (i)	Joe Gibbs Racing	Toyota	27.451	131.143	27.113	132.778	26.980	133.432
3	2	Austin Dillon (i)	Richard Childress Racing	Chevrolet	27.327	131.738	27.213	132.290	27.061	133.033
4	11	Blake Koch	Kaulig Racing	Chevrolet	27.482	130.995	27.260	132.062	27.124	132.724
5	7	Justin Allgaier	JR Motorsports	Chevrolet	27.335	131.699	27.214	132.285	27.130	132.694
6	1	Elliott Sadler	JR Motorsports	Chevrolet	27.582	130.520	27.176	132.470	27.193	132.387
7	6	Bubba Wallace	Roush Fenway Racing	Ford	27.333	131.709	27.287	131.931	27.222	132.246
8	19	Matt Tifft (R)	Joe Gibbs Racing	Toyota	27.659	130.157	27.207	132.319	27.227	132.222
9	00	Cole Custer (R)	Stewart–Haas Racing	Ford	27.529	130.771	27.275	131.989	27.262	132.052
10	62	Brendan Gaughan	Richard Childress Racing	Chevrolet	27.545	130.695	27.289	131.921	27.281	131.960
11	16	Ryan Reed	Roush Fenway Racing	Ford	27.424	131.272	27.295	131.892	27.316	131.791
12	5	Michael Annett	JR Motorsports	Chevrolet	27.472	131.043	27.277	131.979	27.415	131.315
Eliminated in Round 2
13	3	Ty Dillon (i)	Richard Childress Racing	Chevrolet	27.556	130.643	27.299	131.873	—	—
14	24	Drew Herring	JGL Racing	Toyota	27.519	130.819	27.320	131.772	—	—
15	42	Tyler Reddick	Chip Ganassi Racing	Chevrolet	27.606	130.406	27.399	131.392	—	—
16	39	Ryan Sieg	RSS Racing	Chevrolet	27.457	131.114	27.411	131.334	—	—
17	48	Brennan Poole	Chip Ganassi Racing	Chevrolet	27.366	131.550	27.450	131.148	—	—
18	14	J. J. Yeley	TriStar Motorsports	Toyota	27.799	129.501	27.634	130.274	—	—
19	51	Jeremy Clements	Jeremy Clements Racing	Chevrolet	27.753	129.716	27.730	129.823	—	—
20	01	Harrison Rhodes	JD Motorsports	Chevrolet	27.990	128.617	27.873	129.157	—	—
21	07	Ray Black Jr.	SS-Green Light Racing	Chevrolet	28.012	128.516	27.936	128.866	—	—
22	23	Spencer Gallagher (R)	GMS Racing	Chevrolet	27.950	128.801	28.022	128.470	—	—
23	0	Garrett Smithley	JD Motorsports	Chevrolet	27.971	128.705	28.101	128.109	—	—
24	8	Matt Mills	B. J. McLeod Motorsports	Chevrolet	28.069	128.255	28.436	126.600	—	—
Eliminated in Round 1
25	52	Joey Gase	Jimmy Means Racing	Chevrolet	28.099	128.118	—	—	—	—
26	93	Jordan Anderson (i)	RSS Racing	Chevrolet	28.137	127.945	—	—	—	—
27	99	David Starr	BJMM with SS-Green Light Racing	Chevrolet	28.200	127.660	—	—	—	—
28	90	Mario Gosselin	DGM Racing	Chevrolet	28.355	126.962	—	—	—	—
29	89	Morgan Shepherd	Shepherd Racing Ventures	Chevrolet	28.401	126.756	—	—	—	—
30	74	Mike Harmon	Mike Harmon Racing	Dodge	28.563	126.037	—	—	—	—
31	40	Timmy Hill	MBM Motorsports	Dodge	28.717	125.361	—	—	—	—
32	13	Carl Long	MBM Motorsports	Toyota	29.310	122.825	—	—	—	—
Qualified by owner's points
33	22	Ryan Blaney (i)	Team Penske	Ford	—	—	—	—	—	—
34	18	Daniel Suárez (i)	Joe Gibbs Racing	Toyota	—	—	—	—	—	—
35	21	Daniel Hemric (R)	Richard Childress Racing	Chevrolet	—	—	—	—	—	—
36	28	Dakoda Armstrong	JGL Racing	Toyota	—	—	—	—	—	—
Eliminated in Round 1
37	33	Brandon Jones	Richard Childress Racing	Chevrolet	—	—	—	—	—	—
Qualified by owner's points
38	4	Ross Chastain	JD Motorsports	Chevrolet	—	—	—	—	—	—
39	78	B. J. McLeod	B. J. McLeod Motorsports	Chevrolet	—	—	—	—	—	—
40	97	Stephen Leicht	Obaika Racing	Chevrolet	—	—	—	—	—	—
Withdrew
WD	77	Josh Bilicki	Obaika Racing	Chevrolet	—	—	—	—	—	—
Official qualifying results
Official starting lineup

== Race results ==
Stage 1 Laps: 45

Pos	#	Driver	Team	Make	Pts
1	20	Erik Jones (i)	Joe Gibbs Racing	Toyota	0
2	2	Austin Dillon (i)	Richard Childress Racing	Chevrolet	9
3	9	William Byron (R)	JR Motorsports	Chevrolet	8
4	22	Ryan Blaney (i)	Team Penske	Ford	0
5	1	Elliott Sadler	JR Motorsports	Chevrolet	6
6	7	Justin Allgaier	JR Motorsports	Chevrolet	5
7	6	Bubba Wallace	Roush Fenway Racing	Ford	4
8	42	Tyler Reddick	Chip Ganassi Racing	Chevrolet	3
9	21	Daniel Hemric (R)	Richard Childress Racing	Chevrolet	2
10	11	Blake Koch	Kaulig Racing	Chevrolet	1

Stage 2 Laps: 45

Pos	#	Driver	Team	Make	Pts
1	22	Ryan Blaney (i)	Team Penske	Ford	0
2	7	Justin Allgaier	JR Motorsports	Chevrolet	9
3	2	Austin Dillon (i)	Richard Childress Racing	Chevrolet	8
4	1	Elliott Sadler	JR Motorsports	Chevrolet	7
5	20	Erik Jones (i)	Joe Gibbs Racing	Toyota	0
6	42	Tyler Reddick	Chip Ganassi Racing	Chevrolet	5
7	6	Bubba Wallace	Roush Fenway Racing	Ford	4
8	48	Brennan Poole	Chip Ganassi Racing	Chevrolet	3
9	9	William Byron (R)	JR Motorsports	Chevrolet	2
10	11	Blake Koch	Kaulig Racing	Chevrolet	1

Stage 3 Laps: 110

Pos	#	Driver	Team	Make	Laps	Led	Status	Pts
1	7	Justin Allgaier	JR Motorsports	Chevrolet	200	85	running	54
2	22	Ryan Blaney (i)	Team Penske	Ford	200	15	running	0
3	20	Erik Jones (i)	Joe Gibbs Racing	Toyota	200	65	running	0
4	9	William Byron (R)	JR Motorsports	Chevrolet	200	0	running	43
5	1	Elliott Sadler	JR Motorsports	Chevrolet	200	0	running	45
6	6	Bubba Wallace	Roush Fenway Racing	Ford	200	0	running	39
7	21	Daniel Hemric (R)	Richard Childress Racing	Chevrolet	200	0	running	32
8	48	Brennan Poole	Chip Ganassi Racing	Chevrolet	200	0	running	32
9	5	Michael Annett	JR Motorsports	Chevrolet	200	0	running	28
10	3	Ty Dillon (i)	Richard Childress Racing	Chevrolet	200	0	running	0
11	16	Ryan Reed	Roush Fenway Racing	Ford	200	0	running	26
12	19	Matt Tifft (R)	Joe Gibbs Racing	Toyota	200	4	running	25
13	11	Blake Koch	Kaulig Racing	Chevrolet	200	0	running	26
14	42	Tyler Reddick	Chip Ganassi Racing	Chevrolet	200	0	running	31
15	33	Brandon Jones	Richard Childress Racing	Chevrolet	200	0	running	22
16	14	J. J. Yeley	TriStar Motorsports	Toyota	200	0	running	21
17	28	Dakoda Armstrong	JGL Racing	Toyota	200	0	running	20
18	23	Spencer Gallagher (R)	GMS Racing	Chevrolet	200	0	running	19
19	51	Jeremy Clements	Jeremy Clements Racing	Chevrolet	200	0	running	18
20	24	Drew Herring	JGL Racing	Toyota	200	0	running	17
21	00	Cole Custer (R)	Stewart–Haas Racing	Ford	200	0	running	16
22	4	Ross Chastain	JD Motorsports	Chevrolet	200	0	running	15
23	01	Harrison Rhodes	JD Motorsports	Chevrolet	200	0	running	14
24	0	Garrett Smithley	JD Motorsports	Chevrolet	200	0	running	13
25	78	B. J. McLeod	B. J. McLeod Motorsports	Chevrolet	200	0	running	12
26	40	Timmy Hill	MBM Motorsports	Dodge	200	0	running	11
27	62	Brendan Gaughan	Richard Childress Racing	Chevrolet	199	0	running	10
28	90	Mario Gosselin	DGM Racing	Chevrolet	198	0	running	9
29	07	Ray Black Jr.	SS-Green Light Racing	Chevrolet	197	0	running	8
30	8	Matt Mills	B. J. McLeod Motorsports	Chevrolet	197	0	running	7
31	74	Mike Harmon	Mike Harmon Racing	Dodge	197	0	running	6
32	99	David Starr	BJMM with SS-Green Light Racing	Chevrolet	196	0	running	5
33	2	Austin Dillon (i)	Richard Childress Racing	Chevrolet	190	31	crash	0
34	39	Ryan Sieg	RSS Racing	Chevrolet	189	0	crash	3
35	52	Joey Gase	Jimmy Means Racing	Chevrolet	151	0	crash	2
36	89	Morgan Shepherd	Shepherd Racing Ventures	Chevrolet	33	0	brakes	1
37	97	Stephen Leicht	Obaika Racing	Chevrolet	24	0	handling	1
38	13	Carl Long	MBM Motorsports	Toyota	18	0	rear gear	1
39	18	Daniel Suárez (i)	Joe Gibbs Racing	Toyota	11	0	crash	0
40	93	Jordan Anderson (i)	RSS Racing	Chevrolet	3	0	overheating	0
Official race results

== Standings after the race ==
Drivers' Championship standings

Pos	Driver	Points
1	Elliott Sadler	144
2	William Byron	133 (-11)
3	Ryan Reed	121 (–23)
4	Justin Allgaier	115 (–29)
5	Bubba Wallace	109 (–35)
6	Matt Tifft	104 (–40)
7	Brennan Poole	98 (–46)
8	Matt Tifft	91 (–53)
9	Michael Annett	89 (–55)
10	Dakoda Armstrong	84 (–60)
11	Blake Koch	81 (–63)
12	Cole Custer	78 (–66)
Official driver's standings

- Note: Only the first 12 positions are included for the driver standings.

Previous race: 2017 Boyd Gaming 300	NASCAR Xfinity Series; 2017 season	Next race: 2017 Service King 300
