= 2019 Ford EcoBoost 400 =

Race details
- Race 36 of 36 in the 2019 Monster Energy NASCAR Cup Series
- Date: November 17, 2019
- Location: Homestead-Miami Speedway in Homestead, Florida
- Course: Permanent racing facility
- Course length: 1.5 miles (2.4 km)
- Distance: 267 laps, 400.5 mi (640.8 km)
- Average speed: 142.654 miles per hour (229.579 km/h)

Pole position
Driver	Denny Hamlin	Joe Gibbs Racing
- Time: N/A

Most laps led
Driver	Kyle Busch	Joe Gibbs Racing
- Laps: 120

Winner
No. 18	Kyle Busch	Joe Gibbs Racing

Television in the United States
- Network: NBC
- Announcers: Rick Allen, Jeff Burton, Steve Letarte and Dale Earnhardt Jr.
- Nielsen ratings: 3.737 million

Radio in the United States
- Radio: MRN
- Booth announcers: Alex Hayden, Jeff Striegle and Rusty Wallace
- Turn announcers: Dave Moody (1 & 2) and Mike Bagley (3 & 4)

The 2019 Ford EcoBoost 400 was a Monster Energy NASCAR Cup Series race that was held on November 17, 2019, at Homestead-Miami Speedway in Homestead, Florida. Contested over 267 laps on the 1.5 mile (2.4 km) oval, it was the 36th and final race of the 2019 Monster Energy NASCAR Cup Series season. Kyle Busch won the race, claiming his second Cup Series championship.

== Report ==
=== Background ===
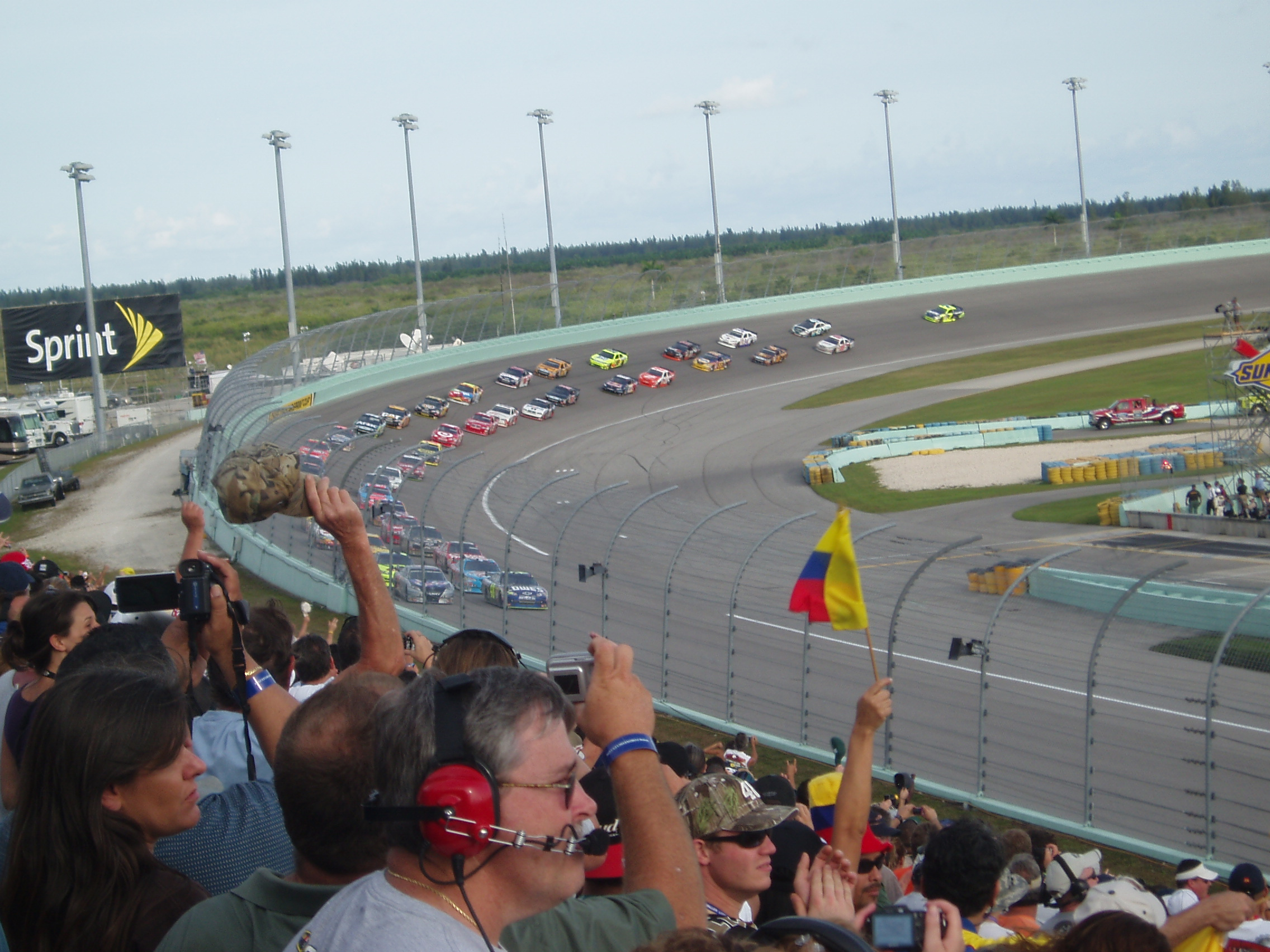
Homestead-Miami Speedway, the track where the race was held.

Homestead-Miami Speedway is a motor racing track located in Homestead, Florida. The track, which has several configurations, has promoted several series of racing, including NASCAR, the Verizon IndyCar Series, the Grand-Am Rolex Sports Car Series and the Championship Cup Series.

From 2002 to 2019, Homestead–Miami Speedway hosted the final race of the season in all three of NASCAR's series: the Cup Series, the Xfinity Series, and the Gander Outdoors Truck Series. Ford Motor Company sponsored all three of the season-ending races, under the names Ford EcoBoost 400, Ford EcoBoost 300, and Ford EcoBoost 200, respectively. The weekend itself was marketed as Ford Championship Weekend. The Xfinity Series held its season-ending races at Homestead from 1995 until 2020, when it was moved to Phoenix Raceway, along with NASCAR's other two series.

==== Championship drivers ====
Martin Truex Jr. was the first of the four drivers to clinch a spot in the Championship 4, winning the first race of the Round of 8 at Martinsville.

Kevin Harvick clinched the second spot in the Championship 4, winning the second race of the Round of 8 at Texas.

Denny Hamlin clinched the third spot after winning the final race of the Round of 8 at Phoenix.

Kyle Busch clinched the last spot in the Championship 4 based on points.

==== Entry list ====
- (i) denotes driver who are ineligible for series driver points.
- (R) denotes rookie driver.
- (CC) denotes championship contender

No.	Driver	Team	Manufacturer
00	Landon Cassill (i)	StarCom Racing	Chevrolet
1	Kurt Busch	Chip Ganassi Racing	Chevrolet
2	Brad Keselowski	Team Penske	Ford
3	Austin Dillon	Richard Childress Racing	Chevrolet
4	Kevin Harvick (CC)	Stewart-Haas Racing	Ford
6	Ryan Newman	Roush Fenway Racing	Ford
8	Daniel Hemric (R)	Richard Childress Racing	Chevrolet
9	Chase Elliott	Hendrick Motorsports	Chevrolet
10	Aric Almirola	Stewart-Haas Racing	Ford
11	Denny Hamlin (CC)	Joe Gibbs Racing	Toyota
12	Ryan Blaney	Team Penske	Ford
13	Ty Dillon	Germain Racing	Chevrolet
14	Clint Bowyer	Stewart-Haas Racing	Ford
15	Joe Nemechek (i)	Premium Motorsports	Chevrolet
17	Ricky Stenhouse Jr.	Roush Fenway Racing	Ford
18	Kyle Busch (CC)	Joe Gibbs Racing	Toyota
19	Martin Truex Jr. (CC)	Joe Gibbs Racing	Toyota
20	Erik Jones	Joe Gibbs Racing	Toyota
21	Paul Menard	Wood Brothers Racing	Ford
22	Joey Logano	Team Penske	Ford
24	William Byron	Hendrick Motorsports	Chevrolet
27	Ross Chastain (i)	Premium Motorsports	Chevrolet
32	Corey LaJoie	Go Fas Racing	Ford
34	Michael McDowell	Front Row Motorsports	Ford
36	John Hunter Nemechek (i)	Front Row Motorsports	Ford
37	Chris Buescher	JTG Daugherty Racing	Chevrolet
38	David Ragan	Front Row Motorsports	Ford
41	Daniel Suárez	Stewart-Haas Racing	Ford
42	Kyle Larson	Chip Ganassi Racing	Chevrolet
43	Bubba Wallace	Richard Petty Motorsports	Chevrolet
47	Ryan Preece (R)	JTG Daugherty Racing	Chevrolet
48	Jimmie Johnson	Hendrick Motorsports	Chevrolet
51	J. J. Yeley (i)	Petty Ware Racing	Ford
52	Josh Bilicki (i)	Rick Ware Racing	Ford
53	B. J. McLeod (i)	Rick Ware Racing	Chevrolet
66	Timmy Hill (i)	MBM Motorsports	Toyota
77	Reed Sorenson	Spire Motorsports	Chevrolet
88	Alex Bowman	Hendrick Motorsports	Chevrolet
95	Matt DiBenedetto	Leavine Family Racing	Toyota
96	Drew Herring	Gaunt Brothers Racing	Toyota
Official entry list

== Practice ==
=== First practice ===
First practice session scheduled for Friday was cancelled due to rain. Final practice session was postponed to Saturday in place of qualifying also due to rain.

=== Final practice ===
Kyle Busch was the fastest in the final practice session with a time of 31.959 seconds and a speed of 168.966 mph (271.924 km/h).

Pos	No.	Driver	Team	Manufacturer	Time	Speed
1	18	Kyle Busch	Joe Gibbs Racing	Toyota	31.959	168.966
2	19	Martin Truex Jr.	Joe Gibbs Racing	Toyota	32.055	168.460
3	11	Denny Hamlin	Joe Gibbs Racing	Toyota	32.090	168.277
Official final practice results

== Qualifying ==
Qualifying for Saturday was cancelled due to rain on Friday. Points leader Denny Hamlin was awarded the pole as a result.

=== Starting Lineup ===
Pos	No.	Driver	Team	Manufacturer
1	11	Denny Hamlin (CC)	Joe Gibbs Racing	Toyota
2	4	Kevin Harvick (CC)	Stewart-Haas Racing	Ford
3	19	Martin Truex Jr. (CC)	Joe Gibbs Racing	Toyota
4	18	Kyle Busch (CC)	Joe Gibbs Racing	Toyota
5	22	Joey Logano	Team Penske	Ford
6	42	Kyle Larson	Chip Ganassi Racing	Chevrolet
7	12	Ryan Blaney	Team Penske	Ford
8	2	Brad Keselowski	Team Penske	Ford
9	24	William Byron	Hendrick Motorsports	Chevrolet
10	14	Clint Bowyer	Stewart-Haas Racing	Ford
11	9	Chase Elliott	Hendrick Motorsports	Chevrolet
12	88	Alex Bowman	Hendrick Motorsports	Chevrolet
13	1	Kurt Busch	Chip Ganassi Racing	Chevrolet
14	10	Aric Almirola	Stewart-Haas Racing	Ford
15	6	Ryan Newman	Roush Fenway Racing	Ford
16	20	Erik Jones	Joe Gibbs Racing	Toyota
17	41	Daniel Suárez	Stewart-Haas Racing	Ford
18	48	Jimmie Johnson	Hendrick Motorsports	Chevrolet
19	21	Paul Menard	Wood Brothers Racing	Ford
20	37	Chris Buescher	JTG Daugherty Racing	Chevrolet
21	95	Matt DiBenedetto	Leavine Family Racing	Toyota
22	3	Austin Dillon	Richard Childress Racing	Chevrolet
23	17	Ricky Stenhouse Jr.	Roush Fenway Racing	Ford
24	13	Ty Dillon	Germain Racing	Chevrolet
25	8	Daniel Hemric (R)	Richard Childress Racing	Chevrolet
26	47	Ryan Preece (R)	JTG Daugherty Racing	Chevrolet
27	43	Bubba Wallace	Richard Petty Motorsports	Chevrolet
28	34	Michael McDowell	Front Row Motorsports	Ford
29	32	Corey LaJoie	Go Fas Racing	Ford
30	36	John Hunter Nemechek (i)	Front Row Motorsports	Ford
31	38	David Ragan	Front Row Motorsports	Ford
32	15	Joe Nemechek (i)	Premium Motorsports	Chevrolet
33	00	Landon Cassill (i)	StarCom Racing	Chevrolet
34	51	J. J. Yeley (i)	Petty Ware Racing	Ford
35	77	Reed Sorenson	Spire Motorsports	Chevrolet
36	27	Ross Chastain (i)	Premium Motorsports	Chevrolet
37	96	Drew Herring	Gaunt Brothers Racing	Toyota
38	52	Josh Bilicki (i)	Rick Ware Racing	Ford
39	53	B. J. McLeod (i)	Rick Ware Racing	Chevrolet
40	66	Timmy Hill (i)	MBM Motorsports	Toyota
Official starting lineup

== Race ==
- Note: Kyle Busch, Kevin Harvick, Denny Hamlin, and Martin Truex Jr. were not eligible for stage points because of their participation in the Championship 4.

=== Stage results ===
Stage One Laps: 80

Pos	No	Driver	Team	Manufacturer	Points
1	19	Martin Truex Jr. (CC)	Joe Gibbs Racing	Toyota	0
2	42	Kyle Larson	Chip Ganassi Racing	Chevrolet	9
3	18	Kyle Busch (CC)	Joe Gibbs Racing	Toyota	0
4	4	Kevin Harvick (CC)	Stewart-Haas Racing	Ford	0
5	11	Denny Hamlin (CC)	Joe Gibbs Racing	Toyota	0
6	12	Ryan Blaney	Team Penske	Ford	5
7	14	Clint Bowyer	Stewart-Haas Racing	Ford	4
8	24	William Byron	Hendrick Motorsports	Chevrolet	3
9	48	Jimmie Johnson	Hendrick Motorsports	Chevrolet	2
10	3	Austin Dillon	Richard Childress Racing	Chevrolet	1
Official stage one results

Stage Two Laps: 80

Pos	No	Driver	Team	Manufacturer	Points
1	18	Kyle Busch (CC)	Joe Gibbs Racing	Toyota	0
2	4	Kevin Harvick (CC)	Stewart-Haas Racing	Ford	0
3	42	Kyle Larson	Chip Ganassi Racing	Chevrolet	8
4	19	Martin Truex Jr. (CC)	Joe Gibbs Racing	Toyota	0
5	11	Denny Hamlin (CC)	Joe Gibbs Racing	Toyota	0
6	12	Ryan Blaney	Team Penske	Ford	5
7	22	Joey Logano	Team Penske	Ford	4
8	20	Erik Jones	Joe Gibbs Racing	Toyota	3
9	48	Jimmie Johnson	Hendrick Motorsports	Chevrolet	2
10	14	Clint Bowyer	Stewart-Haas Racing	Ford	1
Official stage two results

=== Final stage results ===
Stage Three Laps: 107

Pos	Grid	No	Driver	Team	Manufacturer	Laps	Points
1	4	18	Kyle Busch (CC)	Joe Gibbs Racing	Toyota	267	40
2	3	19	Martin Truex Jr. (CC)	Joe Gibbs Racing	Toyota	267	35
3	16	20	Erik Jones	Joe Gibbs Racing	Toyota	267	37
4	2	4	Kevin Harvick (CC)	Stewart-Haas Racing	Ford	267	33
5	5	22	Joey Logano	Team Penske	Ford	267	36
6	10	14	Clint Bowyer	Stewart-Haas Racing	Ford	267	36
7	15	6	Ryan Newman	Roush Fenway Racing	Ford	267	30
8	22	3	Austin Dillon	Richard Childress Racing	Chevrolet	267	30
9	12	88	Alex Bowman	Hendrick Motorsports	Chevrolet	267	28
10	1	11	Denny Hamlin (CC)	Joe Gibbs Racing	Toyota	267	27
11	7	12	Ryan Blaney	Team Penske	Ford	266	36
12	25	8	Daniel Hemric (R)	Richard Childress Racing	Chevrolet	266	25
13	18	48	Jimmie Johnson	Hendrick Motorsports	Chevrolet	266	28
14	17	41	Daniel Suárez	Stewart-Haas Racing	Ford	266	23
15	11	9	Chase Elliott	Hendrick Motorsports	Chevrolet	266	22
16	20	37	Chris Buescher	JTG Daugherty Racing	Chevrolet	266	21
17	19	21	Paul Menard	Wood Brothers Racing	Ford	266	20
18	8	2	Brad Keselowski	Team Penske	Ford	265	19
19	23	17	Ricky Stenhouse Jr.	Roush Fenway Racing	Ford	265	18
20	21	95	Matt DiBenedetto	Leavine Family Racing	Toyota	265	17
21	13	1	Kurt Busch	Chip Ganassi Racing	Chevrolet	265	16
22	14	10	Aric Almirola	Stewart-Haas Racing	Ford	264	15
23	30	36	John Hunter Nemechek (i)	Front Row Motorsports	Ford	264	0
24	24	13	Ty Dillon	Germain Racing	Chevrolet	263	13
25	26	47	Ryan Preece (R)	JTG Daugherty Racing	Chevrolet	263	12
26	28	34	Michael McDowell	Front Row Motorsports	Ford	263	11
27	31	38	David Ragan	Front Row Motorsports	Ford	263	10
28	33	00	Landon Cassill (i)	StarCom Racing	Chevrolet	262	0
29	37	96	Drew Herring	Gaunt Brothers Racing	Toyota	262	8
30	34	51	J. J. Yeley (i)	Petty Ware Racing	Ford	262	0
31	29	32	Corey LaJoie	Go Fas Racing	Ford	261	6
32	39	53	B. J. McLeod (i)	Rick Ware Racing	Chevrolet	256	0
33	40	66	Timmy Hill (i)	MBM Motorsports	Toyota	248	0
34	27	43	Bubba Wallace	Richard Petty Motorsports	Chevrolet	243	3
35	36	27	Ross Chastain (i)	Premium Motorsports	Chevrolet	242	-48^{1}
36	38	52	Josh Bilicki (i)	Rick Ware Racing	Ford	240	-49^{1}
37	35	77	Reed Sorenson	Spire Motorsports	Chevrolet	236	1 / -49^{1}
38	32	15	Joe Nemechek (i)	Premium Motorsports	Chevrolet	227	-49^{1}
39	9	24	William Byron	Hendrick Motorsports	Chevrolet	215	4
40	6	42	Kyle Larson	Chip Ganassi Racing	Chevrolet	209	18
Official race results

NOTE: On November 27, 2019, NASCAR revised the official race results and penalized four teams—15 (Premium Motorsports), 27 (Premium Motorsports), 52 (Rick Ware Racing), and 77 (Spire Motorsports)—with 50-point penalties for teams. As all but one of the drivers was ineligible for points, NASCAR assessed the 50-point penalties for teams (as listed), and no drivers were penalized. The four teams were charged with race manipulation. According to NASCAR officials, the match fixing was deliberately aimed to allow the Premium Motorsports No. 27 team to claim the most owner points of all teams not holding a charter, surpassing the Gaunt Brothers Racing No. 96 team in points, which is worth $175,000 more to the team in question. In the scheme, the 15, 77, and 52 teams all pulled their cars off the track early so the 27 could pass the 96 team in points.

=== Race statistics ===
- Lead changes: 14 among 5 different drivers
- Cautions/Laps: 3 for 15
- Red flags: 0
- Time of race: 2 hours, 48 minutes and 47 seconds
- Average speed: 142.654 miles per hour (229.579 km/h)

=== Race manipulation ===
A race manipulation scheme late in the race was uncovered by NASCAR officials involving four teams (three chartered, one open) with end-of-season points and financial bonus payments. This was announced on November 27, 2019, by NASCAR's Scott Miller, who explained after reviewing data during the race, including radio communications among drivers and teams, including interviewing various competitors, that they had uncovered a deliberate race manipulation scheme to help teams with financial bonuses.

The Premium Motorsports No. 27 team was competing with the Gaunt Brothers Racing No. 96 team to be the highest placed non-charter team, enabling them a higher end of season cash bonus for the teams. Heading into the race, the 27 car was 7 points ahead of the 96 car. According to the official NASCAR statement, they had found that the Spire Motorsports No. 77, Rick Ware Racing No. 52, and Premium Motorsports No. 15 and No. 27 teams deliberately manipulated the finish of the race to allow the No. 27 team (an open team) to score more points than the No. 96 team to claim the Open teams championship, and the financial bonus. Before the race manipulation occurred, Chastain was running 38th around 24 laps back and getting close to being passed by Bubba Wallace in the #43 (which did occur) while the 96 car was running in 29th at 5 laps back. If the fix had not occurred, the 96 would have defeated the 27 by a tiebreaker based on the best finish (with the #96 having a best finish of 15th at the 2019 Daytona 500 and the 2019 1000Bulbs.com 500 and the #27 having a best finish of 18th at the 2019 GEICO 500). The No. 15, 77, and 52 teams each deliberately parked their cars within a 15-lap span near the end of the race in order to ensure the No. 27 team would score two points instead of one, which would have beaten the No. 96 team by one point in the end-of-season results. Spire Motorsports driver Reed Sorenson was heard ignoring multiple calls to pit on the radio before finally obliging, and the team subsequently retired the car for "mechanical issues".

NASCAR fined Scott Egglestone (Premium Motorsports) and Kenneth Evans (Rick Ware Racing) $25,000 each and suspended both indefinitely. All three team owners were fined $50,000, and all four cars were assessed a fifty-point penalty. The same day, Spire Motorsports released a statement saying they would not appeal their penalties, while Premium and RWR did not comment. Premium Motorsports would later be acquired by Rick Ware Racing in May 2020 and would close following the 2020 season. While Gaunt Brothers Racing would close following the 2021 season. Spire Motorsports and Rick Ware Racing are still active in the NASCAR Cup Series as of the 2025 season.

== Media ==
=== Television ===
NBC covered the race on the television side. Rick Allen, Jeff Burton, Steve Letarte and Dale Earnhardt Jr. had the call in the booth for the race. Dave Burns, Parker Kligerman, Marty Snider and Kelli Stavast reported from pit lane during the race. While the race itself aired on NBC, NBCSN aired NBCSN NASCAR Hot Pass, a simultaneous live feed dedicated to each of the Championship drivers, with commentary by Leigh Diffey and Dale Jarrett. Also, three different angles from in-car cameras and a track map tracked the driver's position and changes throughout the field. This will be the last time that NBC broadcast the race as this race moves to March and will be broadcast by Fox in 2020.

NBC
Booth announcers	Pit reporters
Lap-by-lap: Rick Allen; Color-commentator: Jeff Burton; Color-commentator: Steve Letarte; Color-commentator: Dale Earnhardt Jr.	Dave Burns; Parker Kligerman; Marty Snider; Kelli Stavast

=== Radio ===
MRN had the radio call for the race, which was simulcast on Sirius XM NASCAR Radio. Alex Hayden, Jeff Striegle, and NASCAR Hall of Famer Rusty Wallace called the action of the race for MRN when the field raced down the front straightaway. Dave Moody covered the action for MRN in turns 1 & 2, and Mike Bagley had the call of the action from turns 3 & 4. Winston Kelley, Steve Post, Kim Coon, and Dillon Welch covered the action of the race for MRN on pit road.

MRN
Booth announcers	Turn announcers	Pit reporters
Lead announcer: Alex Hayden; Announcer: Jeff Striegle; Announcer: Rusty Wallace	Turns 1 & 2: Dave Moody; Turns 3 & 4: Mike Bagley	Winston Kelley; Steve Post; Kim Coon; Dillon Welch

== Standings after the race ==
	Pos	Driver	Points
3	1	Kyle Busch	5,040
1	2	Martin Truex Jr.	5,035 (–5)
1	3	Kevin Harvick	5,033 (–7)
3	4	Denny Hamlin	5,027 (–13)
	5	Joey Logano	2,380 (–2,660)
1	6	Ryan Blaney	2,339 (–2,701)
1	7	Kyle Larson	2,339 (–2,701)
	8	Brad Keselowski	2,318 (–2,722)
1	9	Clint Bowyer	2,290 (–2,750)
1	10	Chase Elliott	2,275 (–2,765)
2	11	William Byron	2,274 (–2,766)
	12	Alex Bowman	2,257 (–2,783)
	13	Kurt Busch	2,237 (–2,803)
	14	Aric Almirola	2,234 (–2,806)
	15	Ryan Newman	2,219 (–2,821)
	16	Erik Jones	2,194 (–2,846)
Official driver's standings

Manufacturers' Championship standings

Pos	Manufacturer	Points
1	Toyota	1,318
2	Ford	1,268 (–50)
3	Chevrolet	1,222 (–96)

- Note: Only the first 16 positions are included for the driver standings.

Previous race: 2019 Bluegreen Vacations 500	Monster Energy NASCAR Cup Series; 2019 season	Next race: 2020 Daytona 500
