= 2017 Boyd Gaming 300 =

Third race of the 2017 NASCAR Xfinity Series

Race details
- Race 3 of 33 in the 2017 NASCAR Xfinity Series
- Date: March 11, 2017
- Official name: 21st Annual Boyd Gaming 300
- Location: North Las Vegas, Nevada, Las Vegas Motor Speedway
- Course: Permanent racing facility
- Course length: 1.5 miles (2.41 km)
- Distance: 200 laps, 300 mi (482.803 km)
- Scheduled distance: 200 laps, 300 mi (482.803 km)
- Average speed: 118.525 miles per hour (190.747 km/h)

Pole position
Driver	Kyle Busch	Joe Gibbs Racing
- Time: 29.098

Most laps led
Driver	Joey Logano	Team Penske
- Laps: 106

Winner
No. 12	Joey Logano	Team Penske

Television in the United States
- Network: Fox Sports 1
- Announcers: Adam Alexander, Michael Waltrip, Jamie McMurray

Radio in the United States
- Radio: Performance Racing Network

The 2017 Boyd Gaming 300 was the third stock car race of the 2017 NASCAR Xfinity Series season and the 22nd iteration of the event. The race was held on Saturday, March 11, 2017, in North Las Vegas, Nevada at Las Vegas Motor Speedway, a 1.5 miles (2.4 km) permanent D-shaped oval racetrack. The race took the scheduled 200 laps to complete. At race's end, Joey Logano, driving for Team Penske, would hold off the field on the final restart with four to go to complete a dominating run. To fill out the podium, Kyle Larson of Chip Ganassi Racing and Daniel Suárez of Joe Gibbs Racing would finish second and third, respectively.

== Entry list ==
- (R) denotes rookie driver.
- (i) denotes driver who is ineligible for series driver points.

#	Driver	Team	Make
00	Cole Custer (R)	Stewart–Haas Racing	Ford
0	Garrett Smithley	JD Motorsports	Chevrolet
1	Elliott Sadler	JR Motorsports	Chevrolet
01	Harrison Rhodes	JD Motorsports	Chevrolet
2	Austin Dillon (i)	Richard Childress Racing	Chevrolet
3	Ty Dillon (i)	Richard Childress Racing	Chevrolet
4	Ross Chastain	JD Motorsports	Chevrolet
5	Michael Annett	JR Motorsports	Chevrolet
6	Bubba Wallace	Roush Fenway Racing	Ford
7	Justin Allgaier	JR Motorsports	Chevrolet
07	Ray Black Jr.	SS-Green Light Racing	Chevrolet
8	Jeff Green	B. J. McLeod Motorsports	Chevrolet
9	William Byron (R)	JR Motorsports	Chevrolet
11	Blake Koch	Kaulig Racing	Chevrolet
12	Joey Logano (i)	Team Penske	Ford
13	Brandon Hightower	MBM Motorsports	Chevrolet
14	J. J. Yeley	TriStar Motorsports	Toyota
16	Ryan Reed	Roush Fenway Racing	Ford
18	Kyle Busch (i)	Joe Gibbs Racing	Toyota
19	Matt Tifft (R)	Joe Gibbs Racing	Toyota
20	Daniel Suárez (i)	Joe Gibbs Racing	Toyota
21	Daniel Hemric (R)	Richard Childress Racing	Chevrolet
22	Brad Keselowski (i)	Team Penske	Ford
23	Spencer Gallagher (R)	GMS Racing	Chevrolet
24	Drew Herring	JGL Racing	Toyota
28	Dakoda Armstrong	JGL Racing	Toyota
33	Brandon Jones	Richard Childress Racing	Chevrolet
39	Ryan Sieg	RSS Racing	Chevrolet
40	Timmy Hill	MBM Motorsports	Toyota
42	Kyle Larson (i)	Chip Ganassi Racing	Chevrolet
48	Brennan Poole	Chip Ganassi Racing	Chevrolet
51	Jeremy Clements	Jeremy Clements Racing	Chevrolet
52	Joey Gase	Jimmy Means Racing	Chevrolet
62	Brendan Gaughan	Richard Childress Racing	Chevrolet
74	Mike Harmon	Mike Harmon Racing	Dodge
77	Josh Bilicki	Obaika Racing	Chevrolet
78	B. J. McLeod	B. J. McLeod Motorsports	Chevrolet
89	Morgan Shepherd	Shepherd Racing Ventures	Chevrolet
90	Martin Roy	DGM Racing	Chevrolet
93	Jordan Anderson (i)	RSS Racing	Chevrolet
97	Stephen Leicht	Obaika Racing	Chevrolet
98	Aric Almirola (i)	Biagi–DenBeste Racing	Ford
99	David Starr	B. J. McLeod Motorsports with SS-Green Light Racing	Chevrolet
Official entry list

== Practice ==
=== First practice ===
The first practice session was held on Friday, March 10, at 1:00 PM PST, and lasted for 55 minutes. Brendan Gaughan of Richard Childress Racing set the fastest time in the session with a lap of 29.578 and an average speed of 182.568 miles per hour (293.815 km/h).

Pos	#	Driver	Team	Make	Time	Speed
1	62	Brendan Gaughan	Richard Childress Racing	Chevrolet	29.578	182.568
2	20	Daniel Suárez (i)	Joe Gibbs Racing	Toyota	29.605	182.402
3	12	Joey Logano (i)	Team Penske	Ford	29.618	182.322
Full first practice results

=== Final practice ===
The final practice session was held on Friday, March 10, at 3:00 PM PST and lasted for 55 minutes. Daniel Suárez of Joe Gibbs Racing set the fastest time in the session with a lap of 29.607 and an average speed of 182.389 miles per hour (293.527 km/h).

Pos	#	Driver	Team	Make	Time	Speed
1	20	Daniel Suárez (i)	Joe Gibbs Racing	Toyota	29.607	182.389
2	19	Matt Tifft (R)	Joe Gibbs Racing	Toyota	29.618	182.322
3	18	Kyle Busch (i)	Joe Gibbs Racing	Toyota	29.670	182.002
Full Happy Hour practice results

== Qualifying ==
Qualifying would take place on Saturday, March 11, at 10:05 AM PST. Since Las Vegas Motor Speedway is under 2 miles (3.2 km), the qualifying system was a multi-car system that included three rounds. The first round was 15 minutes, where every driver would be able to set a lap within the 15 minutes. Then, the second round would consist of the fastest 24 cars in Round 1, and drivers would have 10 minutes to set a lap. Round 3 consisted of the fastest 12 drivers from Round 2, and the drivers would have 5 minutes to set a time. Whoever was fastest in Round 3 would win the pole.

Kyle Busch of Joe Gibbs Racing would win the pole after advancing from both preliminary rounds and setting the fastest lap in Round 3, with a time of 29.098 and an average speed of 185.580 miles per hour (298.662 km/h).

Three drivers failed to qualify: Morgan Shepherd, Mike Harmon, and Josh Bilicki.

=== Full qualifying results ===
Pos	#	Driver	Team	Make	Time (R1)	Speed (R1)	Time (R2)	Speed (R2)	Time (R3)	Speed (R3)
1	18	Kyle Busch (i)	Joe Gibbs Racing	Toyota	29.538	182.815	29.137	185.331	29.098	185.580
2	22	Brad Keselowski (i)	Team Penske	Ford	28.998	186.220	29.227	184.761	29.117	185.459
3	20	Daniel Suárez (i)	Joe Gibbs Racing	Toyota	29.576	182.580	29.283	184.407	29.130	185.376
4	12	Joey Logano (i)	Team Penske	Ford	29.415	183.580	29.204	184.906	29.171	185.115
5	2	Austin Dillon (i)	Richard Childress Racing	Chevrolet	29.503	183.032	29.323	184.156	29.318	184.187
6	19	Matt Tifft (R)	Joe Gibbs Racing	Toyota	29.585	182.525	29.380	183.799	29.322	184.162
7	42	Kyle Larson (i)	Chip Ganassi Racing	Chevrolet	29.501	183.045	29.266	184.514	29.331	184.106
8	21	Daniel Hemric (R)	Richard Childress Racing	Chevrolet	29.531	182.859	29.429	183.492	29.392	183.723
9	3	Ty Dillon (i)	Richard Childress Racing	Chevrolet	29.515	182.958	29.419	183.555	29.490	183.113
10	16	Ryan Reed	Roush Fenway Racing	Ford	29.596	182.457	29.474	183.212	29.548	182.753
11	48	Brennan Poole	Chip Ganassi Racing	Chevrolet	29.737	181.592	29.491	183.107	29.739	181.580
12	33	Brandon Jones	Richard Childress Racing	Chevrolet	29.610	182.371	29.340	184.049	30.074	179.557
Eliminated in Round 2
13	7	Justin Allgaier	JR Motorsports	Chevrolet	29.783	181.311	29.493	183.094	—	—
14	1	Elliott Sadler	JR Motorsports	Chevrolet	29.849	180.911	29.564	182.655	—	—
15	98	Aric Almirola (i)	Biagi–DenBeste Racing	Ford	29.720	181.696	29.571	182.611	—	—
16	6	Bubba Wallace	Roush Fenway Racing	Ford	29.694	181.855	29.574	182.593	—	—
17	62	Brendan Gaughan	Richard Childress Racing	Chevrolet	29.675	181.971	29.588	182.506	—	—
18	9	William Byron (R)	JR Motorsports	Chevrolet	29.568	182.630	29.657	182.082	—	—
19	11	Blake Koch	Kaulig Racing	Chevrolet	29.758	181.464	29.683	181.922	—	—
20	00	Cole Custer (R)	Stewart–Haas Racing	Ford	29.768	181.403	29.702	181.806	—	—
21	28	Dakoda Armstrong	JGL Racing	Toyota	29.746	181.537	29.714	181.733	—	—
22	24	Drew Herring	JGL Racing	Toyota	29.781	181.324	29.783	181.311	—	—
23	14	J. J. Yeley	TriStar Motorsports	Toyota	29.740	181.574	29.841	180.959	—	—
24	23	Spencer Gallagher (R)	GMS Racing	Chevrolet	29.790	181.269	29.964	180.216	—	—
Eliminated in Round 1
25	51	Jeremy Clements	Jeremy Clements Racing	Chevrolet	30.023	179.862	—	—	—	—
26	4	Ross Chastain	JD Motorsports	Chevrolet	30.130	179.223	—	—	—	—
27	39	Ryan Sieg	RSS Racing	Chevrolet	30.183	178.909	—	—	—	—
28	5	Michael Annett	JR Motorsports	Chevrolet	30.341	177.977	—	—	—	—
29	07	Ray Black Jr.	SS-Green Light Racing	Chevrolet	30.350	177.924	—	—	—	—
30	93	Jordan Anderson (i)	RSS Racing	Chevrolet	30.377	177.766	—	—	—	—
31	01	Harrison Rhodes	JD Motorsports	Chevrolet	30.495	177.078	—	—	—	—
32	40	Timmy Hill	MBM Motorsports	Toyota	30.501	177.043	—	—	—	—
33	8	Jeff Green	B. J. McLeod Motorsports	Chevrolet	30.669	176.074	—	—	—	—
Qualified by owner's points
34	0	Garrett Smithley	JD Motorsports	Chevrolet	30.691	175.947	—	—	—	—
35	90	Martin Roy	DGM Racing	Chevrolet	30.691	175.947	—	—	—	—
36	52	Joey Gase	Jimmy Means Racing	Chevrolet	30.803	175.308	—	—	—	—
37	99	David Starr	BJMM with SS-Green Light Racing	Chevrolet	31.068	173.812	—	—	—	—
38	13	Brandon Hightower	MBM Motorsports	Chevrolet	31.339	172.309	—	—	—	—
39	78	B. J. McLeod	B. J. McLeod Motorsports	Chevrolet	31.713	170.277	—	—	—	—
40	97	Stephen Leicht	Obaika Racing	Chevrolet	33.227	162.518	—	—	—	—
Failed to qualify
41	89	Morgan Shepherd	Shepherd Racing Ventures	Chevrolet	31.267	172.706	—	—	—	—
42	74	Mike Harmon	Mike Harmon Racing	Dodge	31.698	170.358	—	—	—	—
43	77	Josh Bilicki	Obaika Racing	Chevrolet	—	—	—	—	—	—
Official qualifying results
Official starting lineup

== Race results ==
Stage 1 Laps: 45

Fin	#	Driver	Team	Make	Pts
1	18	Kyle Busch (i)	Joe Gibbs Racing	Toyota	0
2	42	Kyle Larson (i)	Chip Ganassi Racing	Chevrolet	0
3	12	Joey Logano (i)	Team Penske	Ford	0
4	22	Brad Keselowski (i)	Team Penske	Ford	0
5	7	Justin Allgaier	JR Motorsports	Chevrolet	6
6	20	Daniel Suárez (i)	Joe Gibbs Racing	Toyota	0
7	19	Matt Tifft (R)	Joe Gibbs Racing	Toyota	4
8	6	Bubba Wallace	Roush Fenway Racing	Ford	3
9	3	Ty Dillon (i)	Richard Childress Racing	Chevrolet	0
10	16	Ryan Reed	Roush Fenway Racing	Ford	1

Stage 2 Laps: 45

Fin	#	Driver	Team	Make	Pts
1	22	Brad Keselowski (i)	Team Penske	Ford	0
2	18	Kyle Busch (i)	Joe Gibbs Racing	Toyota	0
3	7	Justin Allgaier	JR Motorsports	Chevrolet	8
4	42	Kyle Larson (i)	Chip Ganassi Racing	Chevrolet	0
5	21	Daniel Hemric (R)	Richard Childress Racing	Chevrolet	6
6	12	Joey Logano (i)	Team Penske	Ford	0
7	2	Austin Dillon (i)	Richard Childress Racing	Chevrolet	4
8	19	Matt Tifft (R)	Joe Gibbs Racing	Toyota	3
9	20	Daniel Suárez (i)	Joe Gibbs Racing	Toyota	0
10	6	Bubba Wallace	Roush Fenway Racing	Ford	1

Stage 3 Laps: 110

Pos	#	Driver	Team	Make	Laps	Led	Status	Pts
1	12	Joey Logano (i)	Team Penske	Ford	200	106	running	0
2	42	Kyle Larson (i)	Chip Ganassi Racing	Chevrolet	200	33	running	0
3	20	Daniel Suárez (i)	Joe Gibbs Racing	Toyota	200	0	running	0
4	7	Justin Allgaier	JR Motorsports	Chevrolet	200	0	running	47
5	2	Austin Dillon (i)	Richard Childress Racing	Chevrolet	200	0	running	0
6	6	Bubba Wallace	Roush Fenway Racing	Ford	200	0	running	35
7	18	Kyle Busch (i)	Joe Gibbs Racing	Toyota	200	48	running	0
8	1	Elliott Sadler	JR Motorsports	Chevrolet	200	0	running	29
9	16	Ryan Reed	Roush Fenway Racing	Ford	200	0	running	29
10	22	Brad Keselowski (i)	Team Penske	Ford	200	12	running	0
11	00	Cole Custer (R)	Stewart–Haas Racing	Ford	200	0	running	26
12	11	Blake Koch	Kaulig Racing	Chevrolet	200	0	running	25
13	21	Daniel Hemric (R)	Richard Childress Racing	Chevrolet	200	0	running	30
14	9	William Byron (R)	JR Motorsports	Chevrolet	200	0	running	23
15	33	Brandon Jones	Richard Childress Racing	Chevrolet	200	0	running	22
16	48	Brennan Poole	Chip Ganassi Racing	Chevrolet	200	0	running	21
17	98	Aric Almirola (i)	Biagi–DenBeste Racing	Ford	200	0	running	0
18	39	Ryan Sieg	RSS Racing	Chevrolet	200	0	running	19
19	24	Drew Herring	JGL Racing	Toyota	200	0	running	18
20	28	Dakoda Armstrong	JGL Racing	Toyota	200	0	running	17
21	5	Michael Annett	JR Motorsports	Chevrolet	200	0	running	16
22	14	J. J. Yeley	TriStar Motorsports	Toyota	200	1	running	15
23	23	Spencer Gallagher (R)	GMS Racing	Chevrolet	200	0	running	14
24	3	Ty Dillon (i)	Richard Childress Racing	Chevrolet	199	0	running	0
25	4	Ross Chastain	JD Motorsports	Chevrolet	199	0	running	12
26	51	Jeremy Clements	Jeremy Clements Racing	Chevrolet	198	0	running	11
27	01	Harrison Rhodes	JD Motorsports	Chevrolet	198	0	running	10
28	99	David Starr	BJMM with SS-Green Light Racing	Chevrolet	197	0	running	9
29	0	Garrett Smithley	JD Motorsports	Chevrolet	197	0	running	8
30	52	Joey Gase	Jimmy Means Racing	Chevrolet	196	0	running	7
31	07	Ray Black Jr.	SS-Green Light Racing	Chevrolet	196	0	running	6
32	90	Martin Roy	DGM Racing	Chevrolet	196	0	running	5
33	40	Timmy Hill	MBM Motorsports	Toyota	195	0	running	4
34	19	Matt Tifft (R)	Joe Gibbs Racing	Toyota	191	0	crash	10
35	62	Brendan Gaughan	Richard Childress Racing	Chevrolet	189	0	running	2
36	8	Jeff Green	B. J. McLeod Motorsports	Chevrolet	177	0	crash	1
37	78	B. J. McLeod	B. J. McLeod Motorsports	Chevrolet	159	0	brakes	1
38	13	Brandon Hightower	MBM Motorsports	Chevrolet	18	0	vibration	1
39	97	Stephen Leicht	Obaika Racing	Chevrolet	4	0	crash	1
40	93	Jordan Anderson (i)	RSS Racing	Chevrolet	1	0	electrical	0
Official race results

== Standings after the race ==
Drivers' Championship standings

Pos	Driver	Points
1	Elliott Sadler	99
2	Ryan Reed	95 (–4)
3	William Byron	90 (–9)
4	Daniel Hemric	72 (–27)
5	Bubba Wallace	70 (–29)
6	Matt Tifft	66 (–33)
7	Brennan Poole	66 (–33)
8	Brendan Gaughan	64 (–35)
9	Dakoda Armstrong	64 (–35)
10	Cole Custer	62 (–37)
11	Justin Allgaier	61 (–38)
12	Michael Annett	61 (–38)
Official driver's standings

- Note: Only the first 12 positions are included for the driver standings.

Previous race: 2017 Rinnai 250	NASCAR Xfinity Series; 2017 season	Next race: 2017 DC Solar 200
