= 2017 Coca-Cola Firecracker 250 =

15th race of the 2017 NASCAR Xfinity Series

Race details
- Race 15 of 33 in the 2017 NASCAR Xfinity Series
- Date: June 30, 2017
- Official name: 16th Annual Coca-Cola Firecracker 250
- Location: Daytona Beach, Florida, Daytona International Speedway
- Course: Permanent racing facility
- Course length: 2.5 miles (4.0 km)
- Distance: 104 laps, 218.75 mi (418.429 km)
- Scheduled distance: 100 laps, 250 mi (400 km)
- Average speed: 85.859 miles per hour (138.177 km/h)

Pole position
Driver	Brennan Poole	Chip Ganassi Racing
- Time: 49.194

Most laps led
Driver	William Byron	JR Motorsports
- Laps: 29

Winner
No. 9	William Byron	JR Motorsports

Television in the United States
- Network: CNBC
- Announcers: Rick Allen, Jeff Burton, Steve Letarte

Radio in the United States
- Radio: Motor Racing Network

The 2017 Coca-Cola Firecracker 250 was the 15th stock car race of the 2017 NASCAR Xfinity Series season and the 16th iteration of the event. The race was held on Saturday, June 30, 2017, Daytona Beach, Florida, at Daytona International Speedway, a 2.5 miles (4.08 km) permanent triangular-shaped superspeedway. Due to inclement weather, the remainder of the race was held on July 1. The race was extended from 100 laps to 104 laps, due to a NASCAR overtime finish. At race's end, William Byron, driving for JR Motorsports, scored his second win in a row after leading the race when the caution came out with two to go. It was Byron's second career win in the xfinity series. He would also become the youngest winner in Daytona history, being only 19-years old. To fill out the podium, Elliott Sadler of JR Motorsports and Dakoda Armstrong of JGL Racing would finish second and third, respectively.

== Entry list ==
- (R) denotes rookie driver.
- (i) denotes driver who is ineligible for series driver points.

#	Driver	Team	Make
00	Cole Custer (R)	Stewart–Haas Racing	Ford
0	Garrett Smithley	JD Motorsports	Chevrolet
01	Harrison Rhodes	JD Motorsports	Chevrolet
1	Elliott Sadler	JR Motorsports	Chevrolet
2	Ben Kennedy (R)	Richard Childress Racing	Chevrolet
3	Ty Dillon (i)	Richard Childress Racing	Chevrolet
4	Ross Chastain	JD Motorsports	Chevrolet
5	Michael Annett	JR Motorsports	Chevrolet
7	Justin Allgaier	JR Motorsports	Chevrolet
07	Ray Black Jr.	SS-Green Light Racing	Chevrolet
8	Jeff Green	B. J. McLeod Motorsports	Toyota
9	William Byron (R)	JR Motorsports	Chevrolet
11	Blake Koch	Kaulig Racing	Chevrolet
13	Mark Thompson	MBM Motorsports	Toyota
14	J. J. Yeley	TriStar Motorsports	Toyota
16	Ryan Reed	Roush Fenway Racing	Ford
18	Daniel Suárez (i)	Joe Gibbs Racing	Toyota
19	Matt Tifft (R)	Joe Gibbs Racing	Toyota
20	Erik Jones (i)	Joe Gibbs Racing	Toyota
21	Daniel Hemric (R)	Richard Childress Racing	Chevrolet
22	Joey Logano (i)	Team Penske	Ford
23	Spencer Gallagher (R)	GMS Racing	Chevrolet
24	Jeb Burton	JGL Racing	Toyota
25	Chris Cockrum	Chris Cockrum Racing	Chevrolet
26	Scott Lagasse Jr.	JGL Racing	Toyota
28	Dakoda Armstrong	JGL Racing	Toyota
33	Brandon Jones	Richard Childress Racing	Chevrolet
39	Ryan Sieg	RSS Racing	Chevrolet
40	Timmy Hill	MBM Motorsports	Dodge
42	Tyler Reddick	Chip Ganassi Racing	Chevrolet
48	Brennan Poole	Chip Ganassi Racing	Chevrolet
51	Jeremy Clements	Jeremy Clements Racing	Chevrolet
52	Joey Gase	Jimmy Means Racing	Chevrolet
62	Brendan Gaughan	Richard Childress Racing	Chevrolet
74	Mike Harmon	Mike Harmon Racing	Chevrolet
78	B. J. McLeod	B. J. McLeod Motorsports	Toyota
90	Brandon Brown	Brandonbilt Motorsports	Chevrolet
92	Josh Williams	King Autosport	Chevrolet
98	Casey Mears	Biagi–DenBeste Racing	Ford
99	David Starr	B. J. McLeod Motorsports with SS-Green Light Racing	Chevrolet
Official entry list

== Practice ==
=== First practice ===
The first practice session was held on Thursday, June 29, at 2:00 PM EST. The session would last for 55 minutes. Jeb Burton of JGL Racing would set the fastest time in the session, with a lap of 47.315 and an average speed of 190.215 mph (306.121 km/h).

Pos.	#	Driver	Team	Make	Time	Speed
1	24	Jeb Burton	JGL Racing	Toyota	47.315	190.215
2	00	Cole Custer (R)	Stewart–Haas Racing	Ford	47.322	190.186
3	23	Spencer Gallagher (R)	GMS Racing	Chevrolet	47.351	190.070
Full first practice results

=== Final practice ===
The final practice session was held on Thursday, June 29, at 4:00 PM EST. The session would last for 55 minutes. Ray Black Jr. of SS-Green Light Racing would set the fastest time in the session, with a lap of 49.441 and an average speed of 182.035 mph (292.957 km/h).

Pos.	#	Driver	Team	Make	Time	Speed
1	07	Ray Black Jr.	SS-Green Light Racing	Chevrolet	49.441	182.035
2	51	Jeremy Clements	Jeremy Clements Racing	Chevrolet	49.464	181.951
3	14	J. J. Yeley	TriStar Motorsports	Toyota	49.537	181.682
Full final practice results

== Qualifying ==
Qualifying was held on Friday, June 30, at 2:10 PM EST. Since Daytona International Speedway is at least 2 miles (3.2 km), the qualifying system was a single car, single lap, two round system where in the first round, everyone would set a time to determine positions 13–40. Then, the fastest 12 qualifiers would move on to the second round to determine positions 1–12.

Brennan Poole of Chip Ganassi Racing won the pole with a lap of 49.194 and an average speed of 182.949 mph (294.428 km/h).

=== Full qualifying results ===
Pos.	#	Driver	Team	Make	Time (R1)	Speed (R1)	Time (R2)	Speed (R2)
1	48	Brennan Poole	Chip Ganassi Racing	Chevrolet	49.432	182.068	49.194	182.949
2	2	Ben Kennedy (R)	Richard Childress Racing	Chevrolet	49.290	182.593	49.236	182.793
3	9	William Byron (R)	JR Motorsports	Chevrolet	49.395	182.205	49.281	182.626
4	11	Blake Koch	Kaulig Racing	Chevrolet	49.326	182.460	49.313	182.508
5	21	Daniel Hemric (R)	Richard Childress Racing	Chevrolet	49.418	182.120	49.322	182.474
6	19	Matt Tifft (R)	Joe Gibbs Racing	Toyota	49.399	182.190	49.365	182.315
7	1	Elliott Sadler	JR Motorsports	Chevrolet	49.530	181.708	49.371	182.293
8	18	Daniel Suárez (i)	Joe Gibbs Racing	Toyota	49.443	182.028	49.374	182.282
9	62	Brendan Gaughan	Richard Childress Racing	Chevrolet	49.557	181.609	49.451	181.998
10	22	Joey Logano (i)	Team Penske	Ford	49.387	182.234	49.476	181.906
11	5	Michael Annett	JR Motorsports	Chevrolet	49.553	181.624	49.555	181.616
12	16	Ryan Reed	Roush Fenway Racing	Ford	49.511	181.778	49.573	181.550
Eliminated in Round 1
13	42	Tyler Reddick	Chip Ganassi Racing	Chevrolet	49.581	181.521	-	-
14	20	Erik Jones (i)	Joe Gibbs Racing	Toyota	49.583	181.514	-	-
15	3	Ty Dillon (i)	Richard Childress Racing	Chevrolet	49.631	181.338	-	-
16	33	Brandon Jones	Richard Childress Racing	Chevrolet	49.648	181.276	-	-
17	24	Jeb Burton	JGL Racing	Toyota	49.780	180.796	-	-
18	39	Ryan Sieg	RSS Racing	Chevrolet	49.837	180.589	-	-
19	00	Cole Custer (R)	Stewart–Haas Racing	Ford	49.933	180.242	-	-
20	4	Ross Chastain	JD Motorsports	Chevrolet	49.997	180.011	-	-
21	28	Dakoda Armstrong	JGL Racing	Toyota	50.002	179.993	-	-
22	23	Spencer Gallagher (R)	GMS Racing	Chevrolet	50.024	179.914	-	-
23	98	Casey Mears	Biagi–DenBeste Racing	Ford	50.044	179.842	-	-
24	26	Scott Lagasse Jr.	JGL Racing	Toyota	50.075	179.730	-	-
25	7	Justin Allgaier	JR Motorsports	Chevrolet	50.101	179.637	-	-
26	01	Harrison Rhodes	JD Motorsports	Chevrolet	50.412	178.529	-	-
27	0	Garrett Smithley	JD Motorsports	Chevrolet	50.465	178.341	-	-
28	90	Brandon Brown	Brandonbilt Motorsports	Chevrolet	50.524	178.133	-	-
29	25	Chris Cockrum	Chris Cockrum Racing	Chevrolet	50.555	178.024	-	-
30	07	Ray Black Jr.	SS-Green Light Racing	Chevrolet	50.562	177.999	-	-
31	78	B. J. McLeod	B. J. McLeod Motorsports	Toyota	50.576	177.950	-	-
32	92	Josh Williams	King Autosport	Chevrolet	50.602	177.859	-	-
33	99	David Starr	BJMM with SS-Green Light Racing	Chevrolet	50.658	177.662	-	-
Qualified by owner's points
34	52	Joey Gase	Jimmy Means Racing	Chevrolet	50.719	177.448	-	-
35	74	Mike Harmon	Mike Harmon Racing	Dodge	50.782	177.228	-	-
36	40	Timmy Hill	MBM Motorsports	Dodge	50.900	176.817	-	-
37	14	J. J. Yeley	TriStar Motorsports	Toyota	50.921	176.744	-	-
38	51	Jeremy Clements	Jeremy Clements Racing	Chevrolet	50.941	176.675	-	-
39	13	Mark Thompson	MBM Motorsports	Toyota	51.038	176.339	-	-
40	8	Jeff Green	B. J. McLeod Motorsports	Toyota	51.091	176.156	-	-
Official qualifying results
Official starting lineup

== Race results ==
Stage 1 Laps: 30

Pos.	#	Driver	Team	Make	Pts
1	11	Blake Koch	Kaulig Racing	Chevrolet	10
2	2	Ben Kennedy (R)	Richard Childress Racing	Chevrolet	9
3	48	Brennan Poole	Chip Ganassi Racing	Chevrolet	8
4	21	Daniel Hemric (R)	Richard Childress Racing	Chevrolet	7
5	1	Elliott Sadler	JR Motorsports	Chevrolet	6
6	19	Matt Tifft (R)	Joe Gibbs Racing	Toyota	5
7	98	Casey Mears	Biagi–DenBeste Racing	Ford	4
8	24	Jeb Burton	JGL Racing	Toyota	3
9	3	Ty Dillon (i)	Richard Childress Racing	Chevrolet	0
10	42	Tyler Reddick	Chip Ganassi Racing	Chevrolet	1

Stage 2 Laps: 30

Pos.	#	Driver	Team	Make	Pts
1	1	Elliott Sadler	JR Motorsports	Chevrolet	10
2	9	William Byron (R)	JR Motorsports	Chevrolet	9
3	28	Dakoda Armstrong	JGL Racing	Toyota	8
4	3	Ty Dillon (i)	Richard Childress Racing	Chevrolet	0
5	42	Tyler Reddick	Chip Ganassi Racing	Chevrolet	6
6	5	Michael Annett	JR Motorsports	Chevrolet	5
7	48	Brennan Poole	Chip Ganassi Racing	Chevrolet	4
8	33	Brandon Jones	Richard Childress Racing	Chevrolet	3
9	2	Ben Kennedy (R)	Richard Childress Racing	Chevrolet	2
10	23	Spencer Gallagher (R)	GMS Racing	Chevrolet	1

Stage 3 Laps: 44

Pos	#	Driver	Team	Make	Laps	Led	Status	Pts
1	9	William Byron (R)	JR Motorsports	Chevrolet	104	29	Running	49
2	1	Elliott Sadler	JR Motorsports	Chevrolet	104	7	Running	51
3	28	Dakoda Armstrong	JGL Racing	Toyota	104	0	Running	42
4	24	Jeb Burton	JGL Racing	Toyota	104	0	Running	36
5	99	David Starr	BJMM with SS-Green Light Racing	Chevrolet	104	0	Running	32
6	4	Ross Chastain	JD Motorsports	Chevrolet	104	0	Running	31
7	48	Brennan Poole	Chip Ganassi Racing	Chevrolet	104	13	Running	42
8	22	Joey Logano (i)	Team Penske	Ford	104	6	Running	0
9	62	Brendan Gaughan	Richard Childress Racing	Chevrolet	104	0	Running	28
10	52	Joey Gase	Jimmy Means Racing	Chevrolet	104	0	Running	27
11	78	B. J. McLeod	B. J. McLeod Motorsports	Toyota	104	0	Running	26
12	07	Ray Black Jr.	SS-Green Light Racing	Chevrolet	104	0	Running	25
13	14	J. J. Yeley	TriStar Motorsports	Toyota	104	0	Running	24
14	26	Scott Lagasse Jr.	JGL Racing	Toyota	104	0	Running	23
15	51	Jeremy Clements	Jeremy Clements Racing	Chevrolet	104	0	Running	22
16	2	Ben Kennedy (R)	Richard Childress Racing	Chevrolet	104	4	Running	32
17	40	Timmy Hill	MBM Motorsports	Dodge	104	0	Running	20
18	19	Matt Tifft (R)	Joe Gibbs Racing	Toyota	104	0	Running	24
19	33	Brandon Jones	Richard Childress Racing	Chevrolet	104	1	Running	21
20	8	Jeff Green	B. J. McLeod Motorsports	Toyota	104	0	Running	17
21	3	Ty Dillon (i)	Richard Childress Racing	Chevrolet	104	13	Running	0
22	00	Cole Custer (R)	Stewart–Haas Racing	Ford	104	0	Running	15
23	74	Mike Harmon	Mike Harmon Racing	Dodge	104	0	Running	14
24	23	Spencer Gallagher (R)	GMS Racing	Chevrolet	104	0	Running	14
25	20	Erik Jones (i)	Joe Gibbs Racing	Toyota	104	0	Running	0
26	25	Chris Cockrum	Chris Cockrum Racing	Chevrolet	104	0	Running	11
27	42	Tyler Reddick	Chip Ganassi Racing	Chevrolet	103	0	Accident	17
28	0	Garrett Smithley	JD Motorsports	Chevrolet	102	0	Accident	9
29	13	Mark Thompson	MBM Motorsports	Toyota	102	0	Accident	8
30	7	Justin Allgaier	JR Motorsports	Chevrolet	100	2	Accident	7
31	16	Ryan Reed	Roush Fenway Racing	Ford	100	0	Accident	6
32	21	Daniel Hemric (R)	Richard Childress Racing	Chevrolet	99	0	Accident	12
33	5	Michael Annett	JR Motorsports	Chevrolet	98	0	Accident	9
34	98	Casey Mears	Biagi–DenBeste Racing	Ford	98	0	Accident	7
35	39	Ryan Sieg	RSS Racing	Chevrolet	98	0	Accident	2
36	01	Harrison Rhodes	JD Motorsports	Chevrolet	94	0	Rear Gear	1
37	90	Brandon Brown	Brandonbilt Motorsports	Chevrolet	50	0	Accident	1
38	11	Blake Koch	Kaulig Racing	Chevrolet	50	27	Accident	11
39	18	Daniel Suárez (i)	Joe Gibbs Racing	Toyota	50	1	Accident	0
40	92	Josh Williams	King Autosport	Chevrolet	50	0	Accident	1
Official race results

== Standings after the race ==
Drivers' Championship standings

Pos	Driver	Points
1	Elliott Sadler	553
2	William Byron	494 (–59)
3	Justin Allgaier	484 (–69)
4	Brendan Gaughan	378 (–175)
5	Daniel Hemric	368 (–185)
6	Ryan Reed	353 (–200)
7	Cole Custer	337 (–216)
8	Matt Tifft	334 (–219)
9	Bubba Wallace	321 (–232)
10	Dakoda Armstrong	318 (–235)
11	Michael Annett	313 (–240)
12	Blake Koch	286 (–267)
Official driver's standings

- Note: Only the first 12 positions are included for the driver standings.

Previous race: 2017 American Ethanol E15 250	NASCAR Xfinity Series; 2017 season	Next race: 2017 Alsco 300
