= 2019 Camping World 400 =

Race details
- Race 17 of 36 in the 2019 Monster Energy NASCAR Cup Series
- Date: June 30, 2019
- Location: Chicagoland Speedway in Joliet, Illinois
- Course: Permanent racing facility
- Course length: 1.5 miles (2.4 km)
- Distance: 267 laps, 400.5 mi (640.8 km)
- Average speed: 140.677 miles per hour (226.398 km/h)

Pole position
Driver	Austin Dillon	Richard Childress Racing
- Time: 30.636

Most laps led
Driver	Kevin Harvick	Stewart-Haas Racing
- Laps: 132

Winner
No. 88	Alex Bowman	Hendrick Motorsports

Television in the United States
- Network: NBCSN
- Announcers: Rick Allen, Jeff Burton, Steve Letarte and Dale Earnhardt Jr.
- Nielsen ratings: 2.407 million

Radio in the United States
- Radio: MRN
- Booth announcers: Alex Hayden, Jeff Striegle and Rusty Wallace
- Turn announcers: Dave Moody (1 & 2) and Mike Bagley (3 & 4)

The 2019 Camping World 400 was a Monster Energy NASCAR Cup Series race that was held on June 30, 2019 at Chicagoland Speedway in Joliet, Illinois. Contested over 267 laps on the 1.5-mile (2.4 km) intermediate speedway, it was the 17th race of the 2019 Monster Energy NASCAR Cup Series season. Alex Bowman won the race, recording his first career Cup Series victory, while Kyle Larson, Joey Logano, Jimmie Johnson and Brad Keselowski rounded out the top 5.

== Report ==
=== Background ===
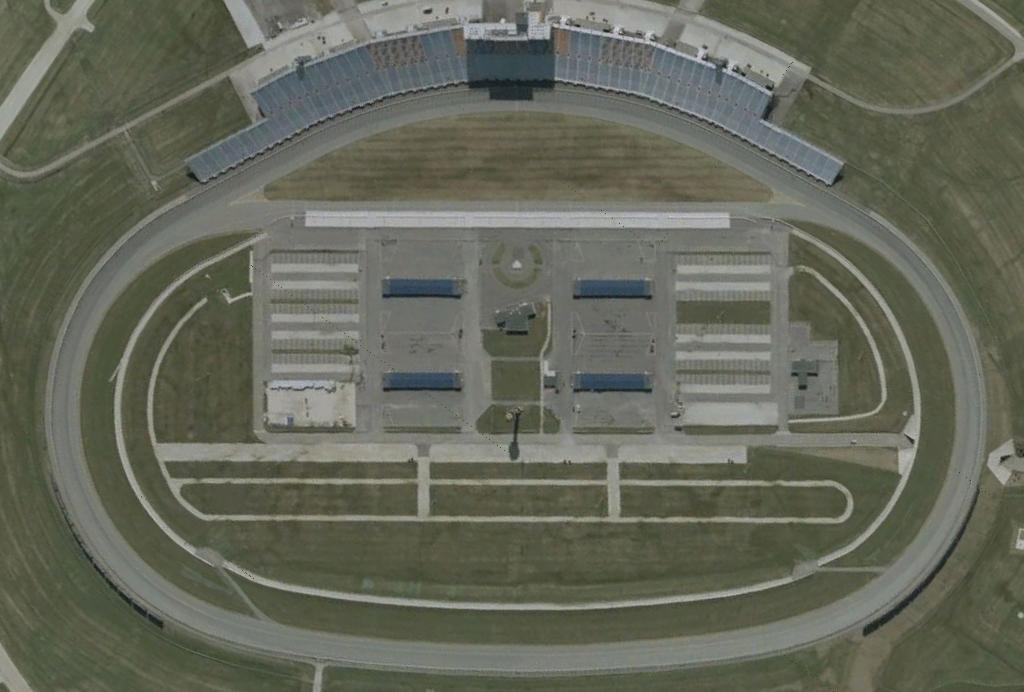
Chicagoland Speedway, the track where the race will be held.

Chicagoland Speedway is a 1.5 miles (2.4 km) tri-oval speedway in Joliet, Illinois, southwest of Chicago. The speedway opened in 2001 and currently hosts NASCAR racing. Until 2011, the speedway also hosted the IndyCar Series, recording numerous close finishes including the closest finish in IndyCar history. The speedway is owned and operated by International Speedway Corporation and located adjacent to Route 66 Raceway.

==== Entry list ====
- (i) denotes driver who are ineligible for series driver points.
- (R) denotes rookie driver.

No.	Driver	Team	Manufacturer
00	Landon Cassill (i)	StarCom Racing	Chevrolet
1	Kurt Busch	Chip Ganassi Racing	Chevrolet
2	Brad Keselowski	Team Penske	Ford
3	Austin Dillon	Richard Childress Racing	Chevrolet
4	Kevin Harvick	Stewart-Haas Racing	Ford
6	Ryan Newman	Roush Fenway Racing	Ford
8	Daniel Hemric (R)	Richard Childress Racing	Chevrolet
9	Chase Elliott	Hendrick Motorsports	Chevrolet
10	Aric Almirola	Stewart-Haas Racing	Ford
11	Denny Hamlin	Joe Gibbs Racing	Toyota
12	Ryan Blaney	Team Penske	Ford
13	Ty Dillon	Germain Racing	Chevrolet
14	Clint Bowyer	Stewart-Haas Racing	Ford
15	Ross Chastain (i)	Premium Motorsports	Chevrolet
17	Ricky Stenhouse Jr.	Roush Fenway Racing	Ford
18	Kyle Busch	Joe Gibbs Racing	Toyota
19	Martin Truex Jr.	Joe Gibbs Racing	Toyota
20	Erik Jones	Joe Gibbs Racing	Toyota
21	Paul Menard	Wood Brothers Racing	Ford
22	Joey Logano	Team Penske	Ford
24	William Byron	Hendrick Motorsports	Chevrolet
27	Reed Sorenson	Premium Motorsports	Chevrolet
32	Corey LaJoie	Go Fas Racing	Ford
34	Michael McDowell	Front Row Motorsports	Ford
36	Matt Tifft (R)	Front Row Motorsports	Ford
37	Chris Buescher	JTG Daugherty Racing	Chevrolet
38	David Ragan	Front Row Motorsports	Ford
41	Daniel Suárez	Stewart-Haas Racing	Ford
42	Kyle Larson	Chip Ganassi Racing	Chevrolet
43	Bubba Wallace	Richard Petty Motorsports	Chevrolet
47	Ryan Preece (R)	JTG Daugherty Racing	Chevrolet
48	Jimmie Johnson	Hendrick Motorsports	Chevrolet
51	B. J. McLeod (i)	Petty Ware Racing	Ford
52	Bayley Currey (i)	Rick Ware Racing	Ford
53	Josh Bilicki (i)	Rick Ware Racing	Chevrolet
77	Quin Houff	Spire Motorsports	Chevrolet
88	Alex Bowman	Hendrick Motorsports	Chevrolet
95	Matt DiBenedetto	Leavine Family Racing	Toyota
Official entry list

== Practice ==
=== First practice ===
Alex Bowman was the fastest in the first practice session with a time of 30.692 seconds and a speed of 175.942 mph (283.151 km/h).

Pos	No.	Driver	Team	Manufacturer	Time	Speed
1	88	Alex Bowman	Hendrick Motorsports	Chevrolet	30.692	175.942
2	1	Kurt Busch	Chip Ganassi Racing	Chevrolet	30.704	175.873
3	4	Kevin Harvick	Stewart-Haas Racing	Ford	30.708	175.850
Official first practice results

=== Final practice ===
Joey Logano was the fastest in the final practice session with a time of 30.954 seconds and a speed of 174.452 mph (280.753 km/h).

Pos	No.	Driver	Team	Manufacturer	Time	Speed
1	22	Joey Logano	Team Penske	Ford	30.954	174.452
2	14	Clint Bowyer	Stewart-Haas Racing	Ford	30.955	174.447
3	4	Kevin Harvick	Stewart-Haas Racing	Ford	30.967	174.379
Official final practice results

== Qualifying ==
Austin Dillon scored the pole for the race with a time of 30.636 and a speed of 176.263 mph (283.668 km/h).

=== Qualifying results ===
Pos	No.	Driver	Team	Manufacturer	Time
1	3	Austin Dillon	Richard Childress Racing	Chevrolet	30.636
2	4	Kevin Harvick	Stewart-Haas Racing	Ford	30.666
3	8	Daniel Hemric (R)	Richard Childress Racing	Chevrolet	30.689
4	48	Jimmie Johnson	Hendrick Motorsports	Chevrolet	30.738
5	1	Kurt Busch	Chip Ganassi Racing	Chevrolet	30.759
6	14	Clint Bowyer	Stewart-Haas Racing	Ford	30.783
7	34	Michael McDowell	Front Row Motorsports	Ford	30.788
8	88	Alex Bowman	Hendrick Motorsports	Chevrolet	30.824
9	11	Denny Hamlin	Joe Gibbs Racing	Toyota	30.837
10	12	Ryan Blaney	Team Penske	Ford	30.841
11	24	William Byron	Hendrick Motorsports	Chevrolet	30.869
12	2	Brad Keselowski	Team Penske	Ford	30.881
13	9	Chase Elliott	Hendrick Motorsports	Chevrolet	30.916
14	42	Kyle Larson	Chip Ganassi Racing	Chevrolet	30.932
15	10	Aric Almirola	Stewart-Haas Racing	Ford	30.938
16	6	Ryan Newman	Roush Fenway Racing	Ford	30.940
17	18	Kyle Busch	Joe Gibbs Racing	Toyota	30.967
18	19	Martin Truex Jr.	Joe Gibbs Racing	Toyota	30.974
19	22	Joey Logano	Team Penske	Ford	31.037
20	13	Ty Dillon	Germain Racing	Chevrolet	31.067
21	20	Erik Jones	Joe Gibbs Racing	Toyota	31.070
22	36	Matt Tifft (R)	Front Row Motorsports	Ford	31.084
23	47	Ryan Preece (R)	JTG Daugherty Racing	Chevrolet	31.155
24	38	David Ragan	Front Row Motorsports	Ford	31.167
25	21	Paul Menard	Wood Brothers Racing	Ford	31.170
26	17	Ricky Stenhouse Jr.	Roush Fenway Racing	Ford	31.184
27	43	Bubba Wallace	Richard Petty Motorsports	Chevrolet	31.194
28	37	Chris Buescher	JTG Daugherty Racing	Chevrolet	31.253
29	41	Daniel Suárez	Stewart-Haas Racing	Ford	31.287
30	95	Matt DiBenedetto	Leavine Family Racing	Toyota	31.346
31	32	Corey LaJoie	Go Fas Racing	Ford	31.452
32	15	Ross Chastain (i)	Premium Motorsports	Chevrolet	31.513
33	52	Bayley Currey (i)	Rick Ware Racing	Ford	31.641
34	00	Landon Cassill (i)	StarCom Racing	Chevrolet	31.702
35	51	B. J. McLeod (i)	Petty Ware Racing	Ford	31.901
36	77	Quin Houff	Spire Motorsports	Chevrolet	32.107
37	53	Josh Bilicki (i)	Rick Ware Racing	Chevrolet	32.126
38	27	Reed Sorenson	Premium Motorsports	Chevrolet	32.185
Official qualifying results

- Note: Matt Tifft started at the back due to failing inspection

== Race ==
=== Stage results ===
Stage One Laps: 80

Pos	No	Driver	Team	Manufacturer	Points
1	11	Denny Hamlin	Joe Gibbs Racing	Toyota	10
2	2	Brad Keselowski	Team Penske	Ford	9
3	34	Michael McDowell	Front Row Motorsports	Ford	8
4	48	Jimmie Johnson	Hendrick Motorsports	Chevrolet	7
5	3	Austin Dillon	Richard Childress Racing	Chevrolet	6
6	19	Martin Truex Jr.	Joe Gibbs Racing	Toyota	5
7	4	Kevin Harvick	Stewart-Haas Racing	Ford	4
8	24	William Byron	Hendrick Motorsports	Chevrolet	3
9	88	Alex Bowman	Hendrick Motorsports	Chevrolet	2
10	1	Kurt Busch	Chip Ganassi Racing	Chevrolet	1
Official stage one results

Stage Two Laps: 80

Pos	No	Driver	Team	Manufacturer	Points
1	4	Kevin Harvick	Stewart-Haas Racing	Ford	10
2	9	Chase Elliott	Hendrick Motorsports	Chevrolet	9
3	42	Kyle Larson	Chip Ganassi Racing	Chevrolet	8
4	88	Alex Bowman	Hendrick Motorsports	Chevrolet	7
5	48	Jimmie Johnson	Hendrick Motorsports	Chevrolet	6
6	19	Martin Truex Jr.	Joe Gibbs Racing	Toyota	5
7	24	William Byron	Hendrick Motorsports	Chevrolet	4
8	1	Kurt Busch	Chip Ganassi Racing	Chevrolet	3
9	18	Kyle Busch	Joe Gibbs Racing	Toyota	2
10	10	Aric Almirola	Stewart-Haas Racing	Ford	1
Official stage two results

=== Final stage results ===
Stage Three Laps: 107

Pos	Grid	No	Driver	Team	Manufacturer	Laps	Points
1	8	88	Alex Bowman	Hendrick Motorsports	Chevrolet	267	49
2	14	42	Kyle Larson	Chip Ganassi Racing	Chevrolet	267	43
3	19	22	Joey Logano	Team Penske	Ford	267	34
4	4	48	Jimmie Johnson	Hendrick Motorsports	Chevrolet	267	46
5	12	2	Brad Keselowski	Team Penske	Ford	267	41
6	10	12	Ryan Blaney	Team Penske	Ford	267	31
7	21	20	Erik Jones	Joe Gibbs Racing	Toyota	267	30
8	11	24	William Byron	Hendrick Motorsports	Chevrolet	267	36
9	18	19	Martin Truex Jr.	Joe Gibbs Racing	Toyota	267	38
10	1	3	Austin Dillon	Richard Childress Racing	Chevrolet	267	33
11	13	9	Chase Elliott	Hendrick Motorsports	Chevrolet	267	35
12	25	17	Ricky Stenhouse Jr.	Roush Fenway Racing	Ford	267	25
13	5	1	Kurt Busch	Chip Ganassi Racing	Chevrolet	267	28
14	2	4	Kevin Harvick	Stewart-Haas Racing	Ford	267	37
15	9	11	Denny Hamlin	Joe Gibbs Racing	Toyota	267	32
16	15	10	Aric Almirola	Stewart-Haas Racing	Ford	267	22
17	16	6	Ryan Newman	Roush Fenway Racing	Ford	266	20
18	27	37	Chris Buescher	JTG Daugherty Racing	Chevrolet	266	19
19	3	8	Daniel Hemric (R)	Richard Childress Racing	Chevrolet	266	18
20	7	34	Michael McDowell	Front Row Motorsports	Ford	266	25
21	24	21	Paul Menard	Wood Brothers Racing	Ford	266	16
22	17	18	Kyle Busch	Joe Gibbs Racing	Toyota	266	17
23	23	38	David Ragan	Front Row Motorsports	Ford	265	14
24	28	41	Daniel Suárez	Stewart-Haas Racing	Ford	265	13
25	26	43	Bubba Wallace	Richard Petty Motorsports	Chevrolet	264	12
26	31	15	Ross Chastain (i)	Premium Motorsports	Chevrolet	264	0
27	29	95	Matt DiBenedetto	Leavine Family Racing	Toyota	264	10
28	22	47	Ryan Preece (R)	JTG Daugherty Racing	Chevrolet	264	9
29	38	36	Matt Tifft (R)	Front Row Motorsports	Ford	263	8
30	30	32	Corey LaJoie	Go Fas Racing	Ford	263	7
31	33	00	Landon Cassill (i)	StarCom Racing	Chevrolet	260	0
32	32	52	Bayley Currey (i)	Rick Ware Racing	Ford	258	0
33	36	53	Josh Bilicki (i)	Rick Ware Racing	Chevrolet	257	0
34	37	27	Reed Sorenson	Premium Motorsports	Chevrolet	249	3
35	20	13	Ty Dillon	Germain Racing	Chevrolet	239	2
36	34	51	B. J. McLeod (i)	Petty Ware Racing	Ford	238	0
37	6	14	Clint Bowyer	Stewart-Haas Racing	Ford	172	1
38	35	77	Quin Houff	Spire Motorsports	Chevrolet	100	1
Official race results

=== Race statistics ===
- Lead changes: 23 among 13 different drivers
- Cautions/Laps: 5 for 25
- Red flags: 1 for 3 hours, 18 minutes and 26 seconds
- Time of race: 2 hours, 50 minutes and 49 seconds
- Average speed: 140.677 miles per hour (226.398 km/h)

== Media ==
=== Television ===
NBC Sports covered the race on the television side. Rick Allen, Jeff Burton, Steve Letarte and 2005 race winner Dale Earnhardt Jr. had the call in the booth for the race. Dave Burns, Parker Kligerman, Marty Snider and Kelli Stavast reported from pit lane during the race.

NBCSN
Booth announcers	Pit reporters
Lap-by-lap: Rick Allen; Color-commentator: Jeff Burton; Color-commentator: Steve Letarte; Color-commentator: Dale Earnhardt Jr.	Dave Burns; Parker Kligerman; Marty Snider; Kelli Stavast

=== Radio ===
The Motor Racing Network had the radio call for the race, which was simulcast on Sirius XM NASCAR Radio.

MRN
Booth announcers	Turn announcers	Pit reporters
Lead announcer: Alex Hayden; Announcer: Jeff Striegle; Announcer: Rusty Wallace	Turns 1 & 2: Dave Moody; Turns 3 & 4: Mike Bagley	Winston Kelley; Pete Pistone; Hannah Newhouse

== Standings after the race ==
Drivers' Championship standings

	Pos	Driver	Points
	1	Joey Logano	677
	2	Kyle Busch	659 (–18)
1	3	Brad Keselowski	610 (–67)
1	4	Kevin Harvick	610 (–67)
	5	Martin Truex Jr.	581 (–96)
	6	Denny Hamlin	574 (–103)
	7	Chase Elliott	570 (–107)
	8	Kurt Busch	537 (–140)
1	9	Alex Bowman	509 (–168)
1	10	Ryan Blaney	499 (–178)
	11	Aric Almirola	482 (–195)
2	12	William Byron	455 (–222)
2	13	Kyle Larson	451 (–226)
3	14	Jimmie Johnson	436 (–241)
2	15	Daniel Suárez	434 (–243)
4	16	Clint Bowyer	431 (–246)
Official driver's standings

Manufacturers' Championship standings

Pos	Manufacturer	Points
1	Toyota	628
2	Ford	610 (–18)
3	Chevrolet	570 (–58)

- Note: Only the first 16 positions are included for the driver standings.
- . – Driver has clinched a position in the Monster Energy NASCAR Cup Series playoffs.

Previous race: 2019 Toyota/Save Mart 350	Monster Energy NASCAR Cup Series; 2019 season	Next race: 2019 Coke Zero Sugar 400
