= Alex Bowman =

American racing driver (born 1993)

- Bowman at Las Vegas Motor Speedway in 2026
- Born: Alexander Michael Warren Bowman; April 25, 1993 (age 33); Tucson, Arizona, U.S.
- Height: 6 ft 1 in (1.85 m)
- Weight: 178 lb (81 kg)
- Achievements: 2008 USAC Speed2 National Midget Champion; 2008 USAC Speed2 California Dirt Midget Champion; 2018, 2021, 2023 Daytona 500 Pole Winner; NASCAR record for most front row starts and most consecutive front row starts in the Daytona 500 (6 times, 2018–2023)
- Awards: 2009 USAC National Midget Championship Rookie of the Year; 2011 K&N Pro Series East Rookie of the Year; 2012 ARCA Racing Series Rookie of the Year

NASCAR Cup Series career
- 394 races run over 12 years
- Car no., team: No. 48 (Hendrick Motorsports)
- 2026 position: 26th
- Best finish: 6th (2020)
- First race: 2014 Daytona 500 (Daytona)
- Last race: 2026 Season Finale 400 (Homestead)
- First win: 2019 Camping World 400 (Chicagoland)
- Last win: 2024 Grant Park 165 (Chicago Street)
Wins	Top tens	Poles
8	120	7

NASCAR O'Reilly Auto Parts Series career
- 57 races run over 11 years
- 2025 position: 79th
- Best finish: 11th (2013)
- First race: 2012 Dollar General 300 (Chicagoland)
- Last race: 2025 GOVX 200 (Phoenix)
- First win: 2017 Drive for the Cure 300 (Charlotte)
Wins	Top tens	Poles
1	19	4

NASCAR FedEx Freight Truck Series career
- 4 races run over 3 years
- 2023 position: 115th
- Best finish: 79th (2017)
- First race: 2015 Careers for Veterans 200 (Michigan)
- Last race: 2022 DoorDash 250 (Sonoma)
Wins	Top tens	Poles
0	1	0

ARCA Menards Series career
- 21 races run over 2 years
- Best finish: 4th (2012)
- First race: 2011 Herr's Live Life With Flavor! 200 (Madison)
- Last race: 2012 Kansas Lottery 98.9 (Kansas)
- First win: 2011 Herr's Live Life With Flavor! 200 (Madison)
- Last win: 2012 Kansas Lottery 98.9 (Kansas)
Wins	Top tens	Poles
6	15	6

ARCA Menards Series East career
- 12 races run over 1 year
- Best finish: 6th (2011)
- First race: 2011 Kevin Whitaker Chevrolet 150 (Greenville-Pickens)
- Last race: 2011 Dover 150 (Dover)
Wins	Top tens	Poles
0	7	0

ARCA Menards Series West career
- 3 races run over 2 years
- Best finish: 42nd (2011)
- First race: 2011 Toyota/NAPA Auto Parts 150 (Colorado)
- Last race: 2018 Carneros 200 (Sonoma)
Wins	Top tens	Poles
0	2	0
- Statistics up to date as of November 8, 2026.

Alexander Michael Warren Bowman (born April 25, 1993) is an American professional stock car racing driver and team owner. He competes full-time in the NASCAR Cup Series, driving the No. 48 Chevrolet Camaro ZL1 for Hendrick Motorsports. He owns a Dirt Midget and Sprint car racing team, Alex Bowman Racing. He is known for a record six consecutive front-row starts in the Daytona 500, from 2018 to 2023, winning the pole in 2018, 2021, and 2023.

Bowman is known by many nicknames, the most predominant being Bowman the Showman. Denny Hamlin called him "just a hack" after late-race contact between the two at Martinsville in 2021 resulted in Hamlin being spun from the lead. Bowman would go on to win the race. Following a 2022 race at Las Vegas, Kyle Busch said Bowman was "all luck, no skill" after Bowman won the race by taking two tires on a pit stop during a late-race caution.

== Racing career ==
=== Beginnings ===
A native of Tucson, Arizona, Bowman started his racing career on short tracks in Arizona and California in 2000 at the age of seven, driving quarter midget cars in United States Auto Club (USAC) competition. By 2006, he had won nine national championships and had 165 feature wins.

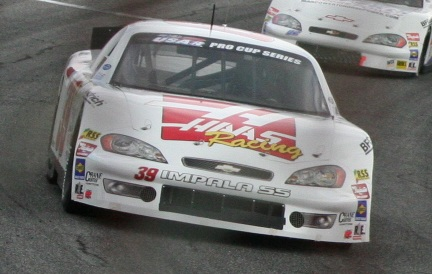
Bowman's 2010 Pro Cup car

=== Midget racing ===
In 2008, Bowman won the USAC National Focus Midget championship with eleven wins, as well as the California Dirt Focus Midget championship. In 2009, he was named USAC National Midget Rookie of the Year. In February 2010, Bowman was injured in an accident during a USAC race, suffering a fractured clavicle and rib. Bowman continues to field a midget in select races.

=== K&N Pro Series East & West ===
In 2010, at the age of eighteen, Bowman moved to full-bodied stock car racing, making two Rev-Oil Pro Cup starts and a late model start. Bowman moved to the NASCAR K&N Pro Series East with X Team Racing for 2011. Bowman finished sixth in series points, winning Rookie of the Year honors. In 2018, Bowman made his return to the West Series at Sonoma Raceway, driving the No. 24 for Bill McAnally Racing.

=== ARCA Racing Series ===
Bowman competed in two ARCA Racing Series events during 2011 for Venturini Motorsports, at Madison International Speedway and Kansas Speedway, winning both events.

He moved full-time to ARCA for 2012 for Cunningham Motorsports as a development driver for Penske Racing, winning races at Salem Speedway, Winchester Speedway, Iowa Speedway, and Kansas Speedway over the course of the year. He also won the pole for the inaugural ARCA Mobile 200 at Mobile International Speedway.

=== O'Reilly Auto Parts and FedEx Freight Truck Series ===
2012

In 2012, Bowman made his debut at the national level of NASCAR competition, driving for Turner Motorsports in the Nationwide Series at Chicagoland Speedway. He finished seventeenth in his debut race; he also drove for RAB Racing in the Nationwide Series at Kentucky Speedway and Phoenix Raceway, and for Turner at Dover Motor Speedway, towards the end of 2012.

2013

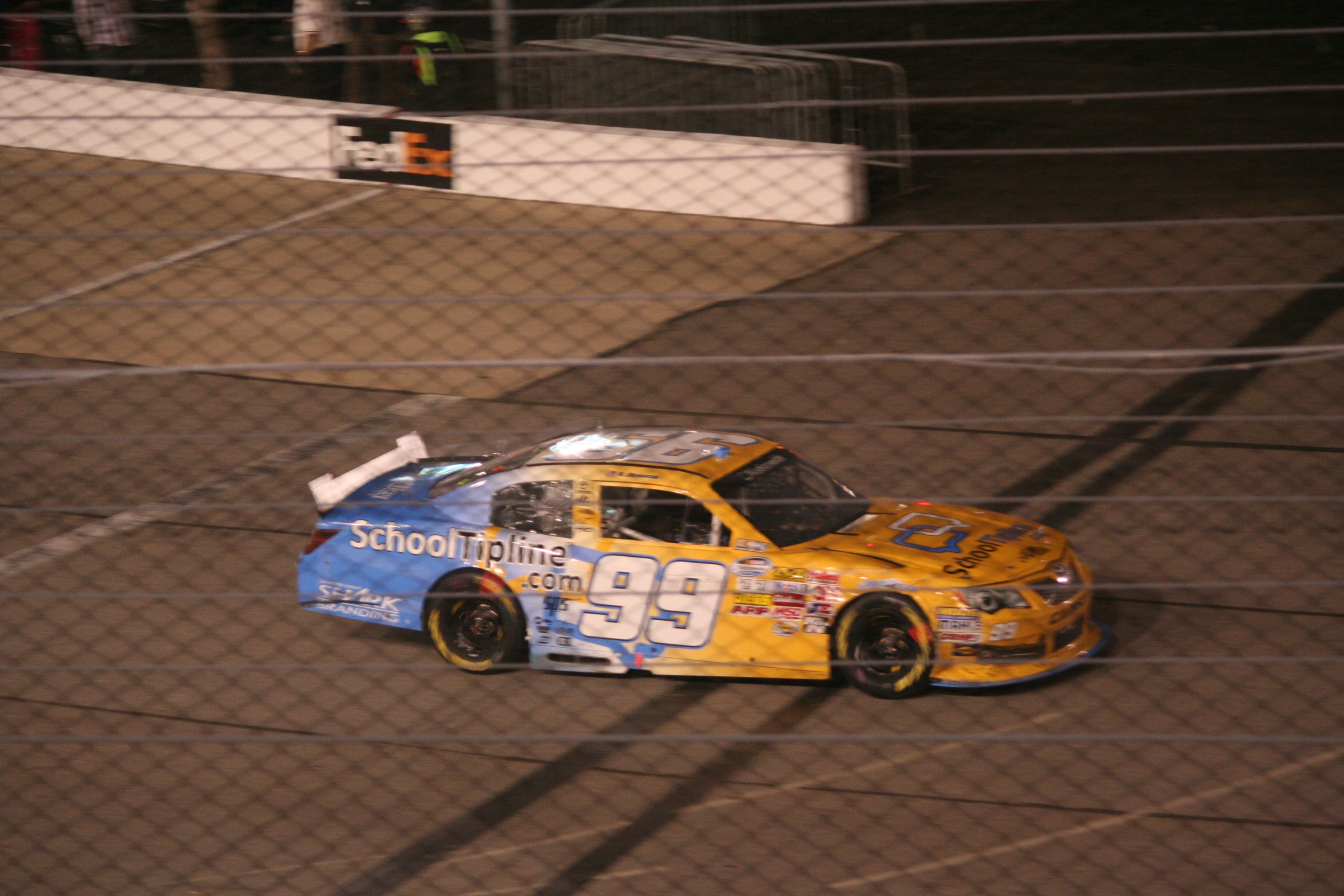
Bowman's 2013 Nationwide Series car

In January 2013, it was announced that Bowman would run the full Nationwide Series season for RAB in 2013, competing for Rookie of the Year honors. He won his first career Nationwide pole at the O'Reilly Auto Parts 300 at Texas. Bowman won another pole at Texas later in the season, but was released by the team prior to the season-ending race at Homestead–Miami Speedway. Bowman ended the season with six top-tens in 32 starts.

2014

Bowman returned to the Nationwide Series in 2014, driving the No. 80 for Hattori Racing Enterprises at Dover, while driving the No. 5 JR Motorsports Chevy at Charlotte and Phoenix.

2015

During the 2015 season, Bowman made starts in the Xfinity Series with Athenian Motorsports and a Truck Series race with JRM.

2016

On November 11, Bowman joined JRM for nine races in the No. 88 for the 2016 Xfinity season. He won a pole at Michigan and finished in the top ten in all but two races. Despite the success, Bowman struggled to find sponsorship that would grant him the opportunity to race full-time for JRM.

2017

In 2017, Bowman joined GMS Racing to run the Truck Series race at Atlanta in the No. 24 as a fill-in driver for Justin Haley, who was too young to race at the track. In October and November, Bowman drove the No. 42 Xfinity car of Chip Ganassi Racing at Charlotte and Phoenix. At Charlotte, Bowman dominated the final portion of the race following a late restart to win his first NASCAR national series race.

2022

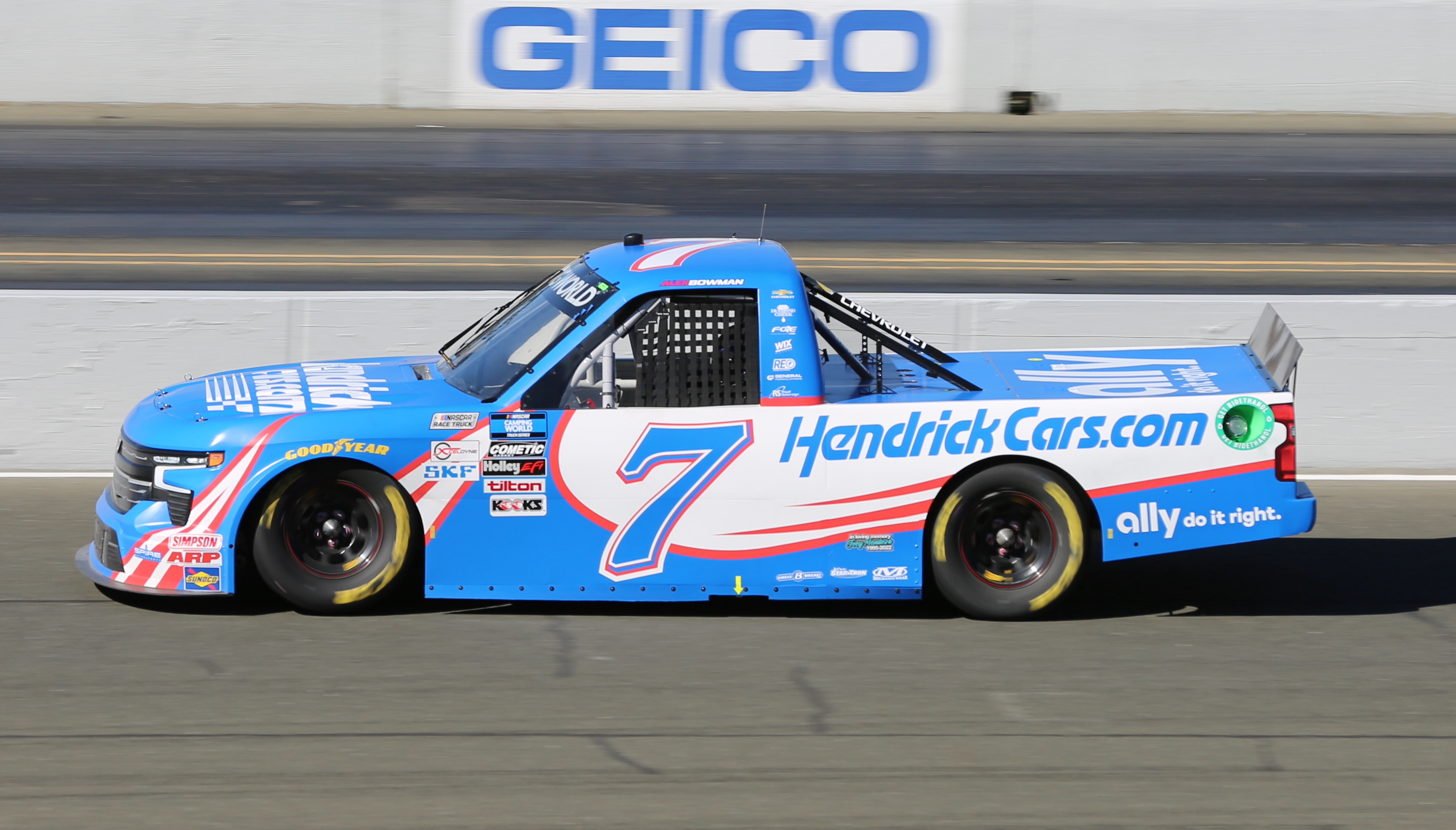
Bowman's No. 7 truck at Sonoma Raceway in 2022

In 2022, it was announced by Spire Motorsports that Bowman would drive their No. 7 truck series entry at COTA with sponsorship from HendrickCars.com.

=== Cup Series ===
BK Racing (2014)

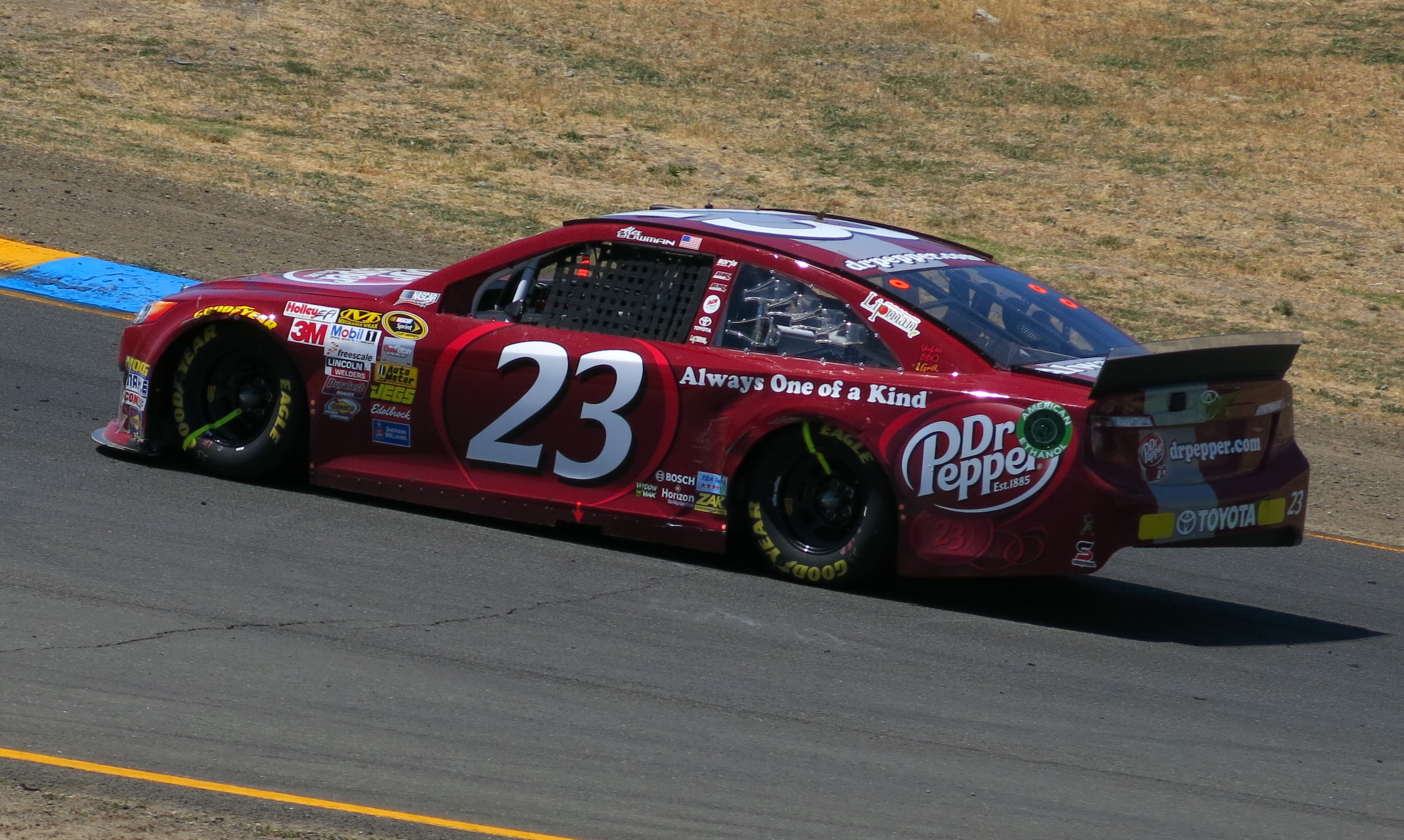
Bowman in the 23 for BK Racing at Sonoma Raceway in 2014

In January 2014, Bowman tested for BK Racing as part of Preseason Thunder before the 2014 Daytona 500 in the No. 83. On January 20, the team announced his hiring for the No. 23 car for 2014, running the full 2014 NASCAR Sprint Cup Series season for Rookie of the Year.

Tommy Baldwin Racing (2015)

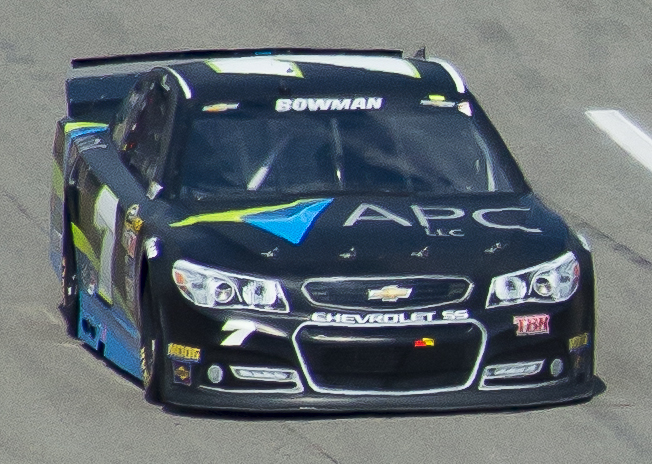
Bowman's 2015 Cup Series car

On January 30, 2015, it was announced that Bowman would drive the full 2015 NASCAR Sprint Cup Series season in the No. 7 car for Tommy Baldwin Racing. He failed to qualify for the Daytona 500 after he was caught up in a multi-car wreck in his duel race. In New Hampshire, his car erupted in flames after rubber from a blown tire got into the engine. He was able to return to the track. On the final lap, he blew a tire, causing him to smack the wall before the caution came out. On January 21, 2016, Bowman parted ways with Tommy Baldwin Racing, losing his Sprint Cup ride.

==== Hendrick Motorsports (2016–2027) ====
2016 Substitute for the No. 88

Bowman returned to the Cup Series at Loudon in the New Hampshire 301, driving the No. 88 for Hendrick Motorsports as an interim driver for Dale Earnhardt Jr., who missed the remainder of the 2016 season because of concussion issues. Despite running in the top ten, including as high as eighth, Bowman blew a tire and hit the wall in turn one on lap 272, relegating him to a 26th-place finish.

Bowman and Jeff Gordon alternated in the No. 88 car for the balance of the 2016 season. Bowman won his first career pole at Phoenix. In that race, Bowman led the most laps with 197 and tried to make what would have been the winning pass on Matt Kenseth with six laps to go. While passing Kenseth, Bowman got tapped from behind by Kyle Busch, spinning Kenseth out; Bowman recovered to finish sixth.

2017

In December 2016, Rick Hendrick announced that Bowman would run the No. 88 in place of Earnhardt Jr. for the 2017 Advance Auto Parts Clash at Daytona; while Earnhardt Jr. was also eligible for the event, he elected to allow Bowman drive the car out of appreciation for substituting in 2016. Bowman finished third after losing out in a side-by-side battle for second with Kyle Busch. When Earnhardt Jr. announced his retirement in the spring, he expressed support for Bowman to replace him in the No. 88 for the 2018 season. On July 20, Hendrick Motorsports formally named Bowman as the driver of the No. 88 car in 2018.

2018 Replacing Dale Jr.

Bowman opened up the 2018 season on February 11 by winning the pole for the 2018 Daytona 500. Despite being winless, he made his Playoff debut by staying consistent with two top-fives and nine top-tens. After the Charlotte Roval race, Bowman advanced to the Round of 12. Bowman was eliminated from the Round of 12 after the fall Kansas race and finished sixteenth in points.

2019

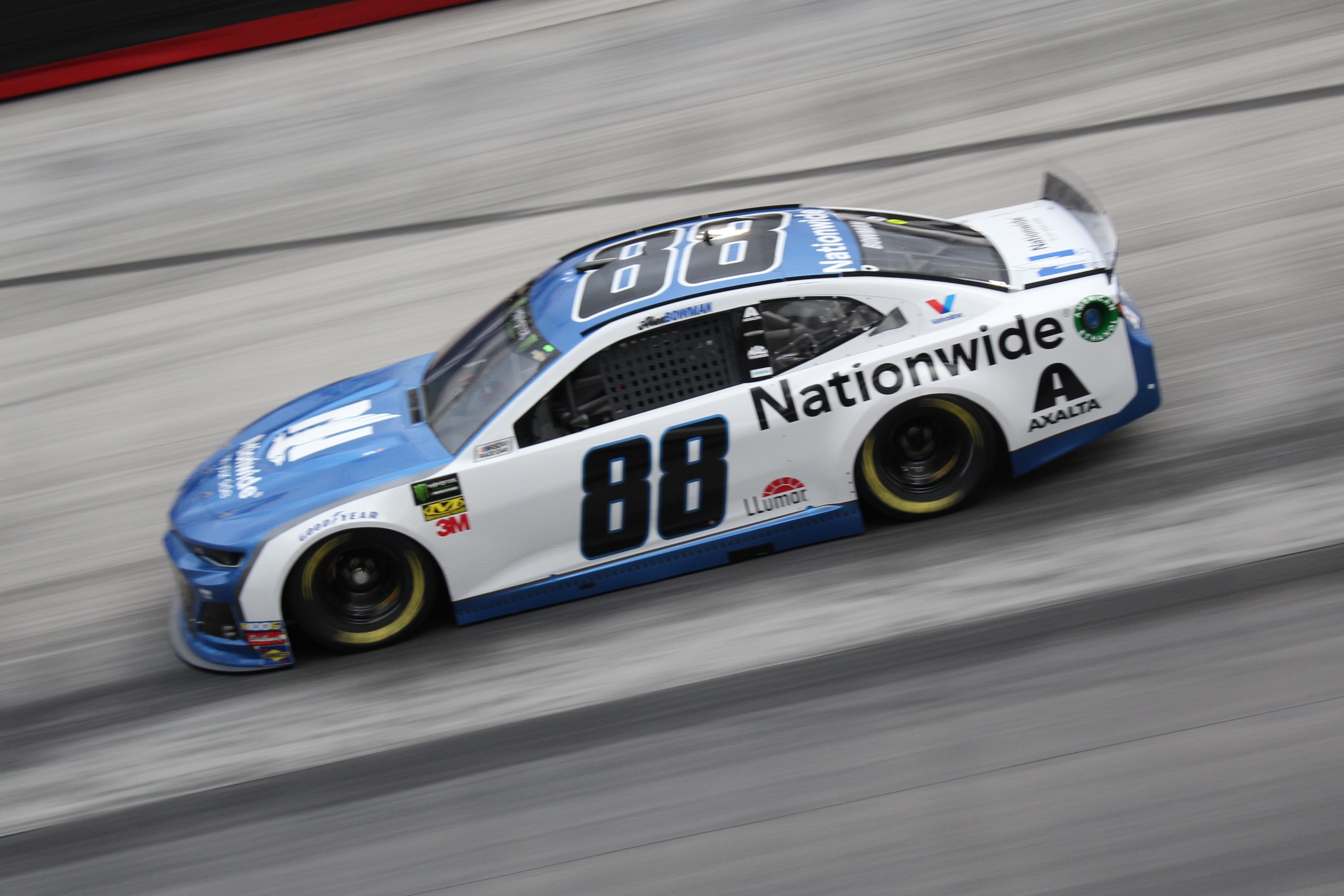
Bowman in the No. 88 during the 2019 Food City 500

The 2019 season saw improvement in Bowman's finishes, including three consecutive second-place finishes at Talladega, Dover, and Kansas. At Kansas, Bowman dominated the later portion of the race but was passed by Brad Keselowski with eight laps to go and could not retake the lead. Bowman also made the starting grid of the 2019 Monster Energy NASCAR All-Star Race by winning the Fan Vote.

At the 2019 Camping World 400 at Chicagoland Speedway, Bowman again dominated the final stage of the race but was passed by Kyle Larson with 8 to go. However, unlike the race at Kansas, Bowman was able to pass Larson again with 6 to go and won his first Cup Series race. With the win, Bowman has finished in every possible position in a NASCAR Cup event. Bowman opened the first round of the playoffs with a solid sixth place finish at Las Vegas, dismal 23rd-place at Richmond, and runner-up to Hendrick teammate Chase Elliott at the Charlotte Roval, which secured his advancement into the Round of 12. At Talladega, Bowman was leading the pack in the closing laps of Stage 2 when he was punted from behind by Joey Logano, triggering The Big One. Bowman was eliminated in the Round of 12 after the Kansas race.

2020

On March 1, 2020, Bowman got his second career NASCAR Cup Series win in the Auto Club 400 after leading 110 laps and winning stage 1. After a late pit-stop by second-placed Ryan Blaney, Bowman beat Kyle Busch by a margin of nine seconds. On October 6, Hendrick Motorsports announced that Bowman and crew chief Greg Ives would switch to the No. 48 car to replace the retiring Jimmie Johnson for the 2021 season, during which he inherited Ally Financial's sponsorship; the No. 88 was taken over by Kyle Larson and renumbered to No. 5. Bowman finished sixth in the 2020 standings.

2021 Move to the No. 48

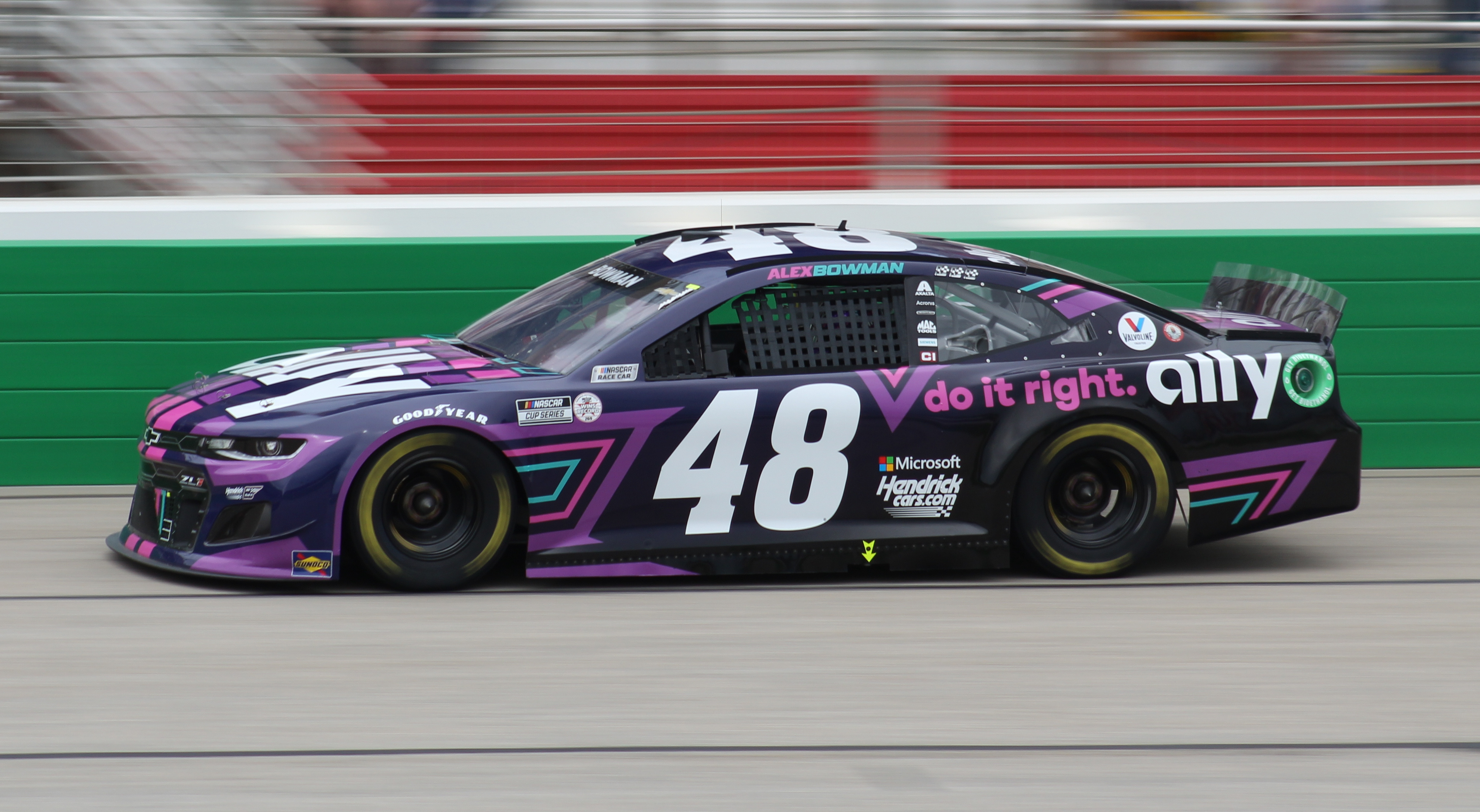
Bowman in the No. 48 at Atlanta Motor Speedway in 2021

Bowman started the 2021 season by winning the pole at the 2021 Daytona 500. After an inconsistent start to the year, Bowman won at Richmond after holding off Denny Hamlin and Joey Logano in a late race restart with twelve laps to go, his third career victory and the first time that the No. 48 returned to Victory Lane since Johnson won the 2017 AAA 400 Drive for Autism. Three weeks later, Bowman achieved his second win of the season at the 2021 Drydene 400. On June 18, Bowman signed a contract extension with Hendrick Motorsports through 2023. He won again at the 2021 Pocono Organics CBD 325 when teammate Larson, the leader, blew a tire going into the last corner on the last lap. During the playoffs, Bowman made it to the Round of 12, but struggled with poor finishes at Las Vegas and Talladega. Following the Charlotte Roval race, he was eliminated from the Round of 8. Despite his elimination, Bowman scored his sixth career win at Martinsville. He finished the season fourteenth in the points standings.

2022 Concussion

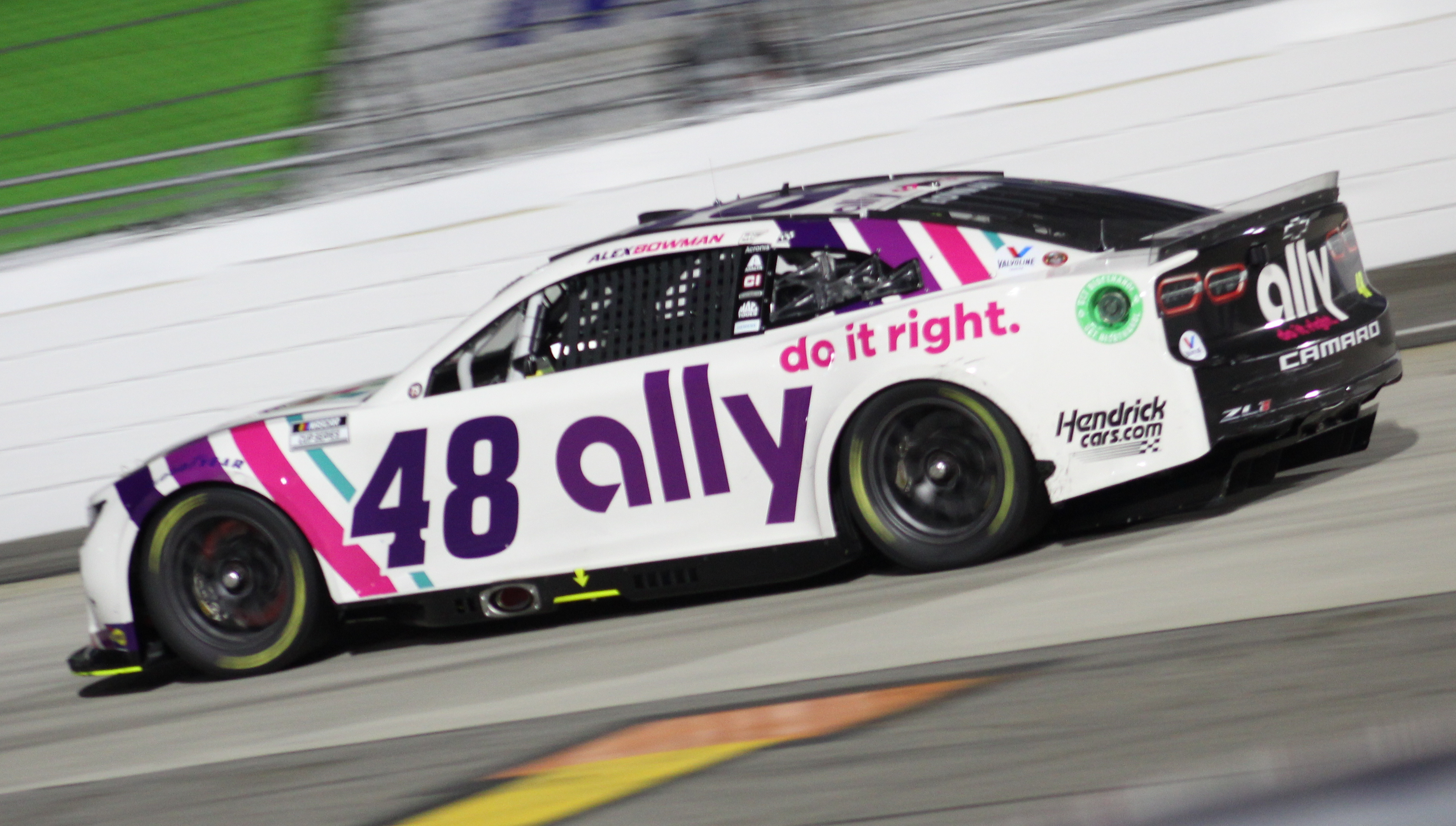
Bowman in the No. 48 at Martinsville Speedway in 2022

Bowman's 2022 season began by qualifying 2nd for the 2022 Daytona 500, but he was involved in a lap 63 crash in which he slammed into the flipping car of Harrison Burton. He was able to continue, but lost four laps, ultimately finishing 24th. The following week, at the WISE Power 400 in Fontana, Bowman was running in the top 10 when he hit the outside wall late in the race, finishing 25th. However, he won the 2022 Pennzoil 400 at Las Vegas, his seventh career victory, after battling with teammate Kyle Larson over the last couple of laps. In the race at Circuit of the Americas, Bowman was in the lead heading into turn 19 on the final lap. However, Ross Chastain bumped A. J. Allmendinger into Bowman, causing him to go wide and finish second behind Chastain. A concussion sustained from his crash at Texas forced him to miss the races at Talladega, Charlotte Roval, Las Vegas, Homestead, and Martinsville, with Noah Gragson filling in the No. 48 for him. Due to his injury, Bowman was eliminated in the Round of 12. Bowman was cleared to return for the title decider race on October 28. He finished the season sixteenth in the points standings.

2023 Back injury and winless season

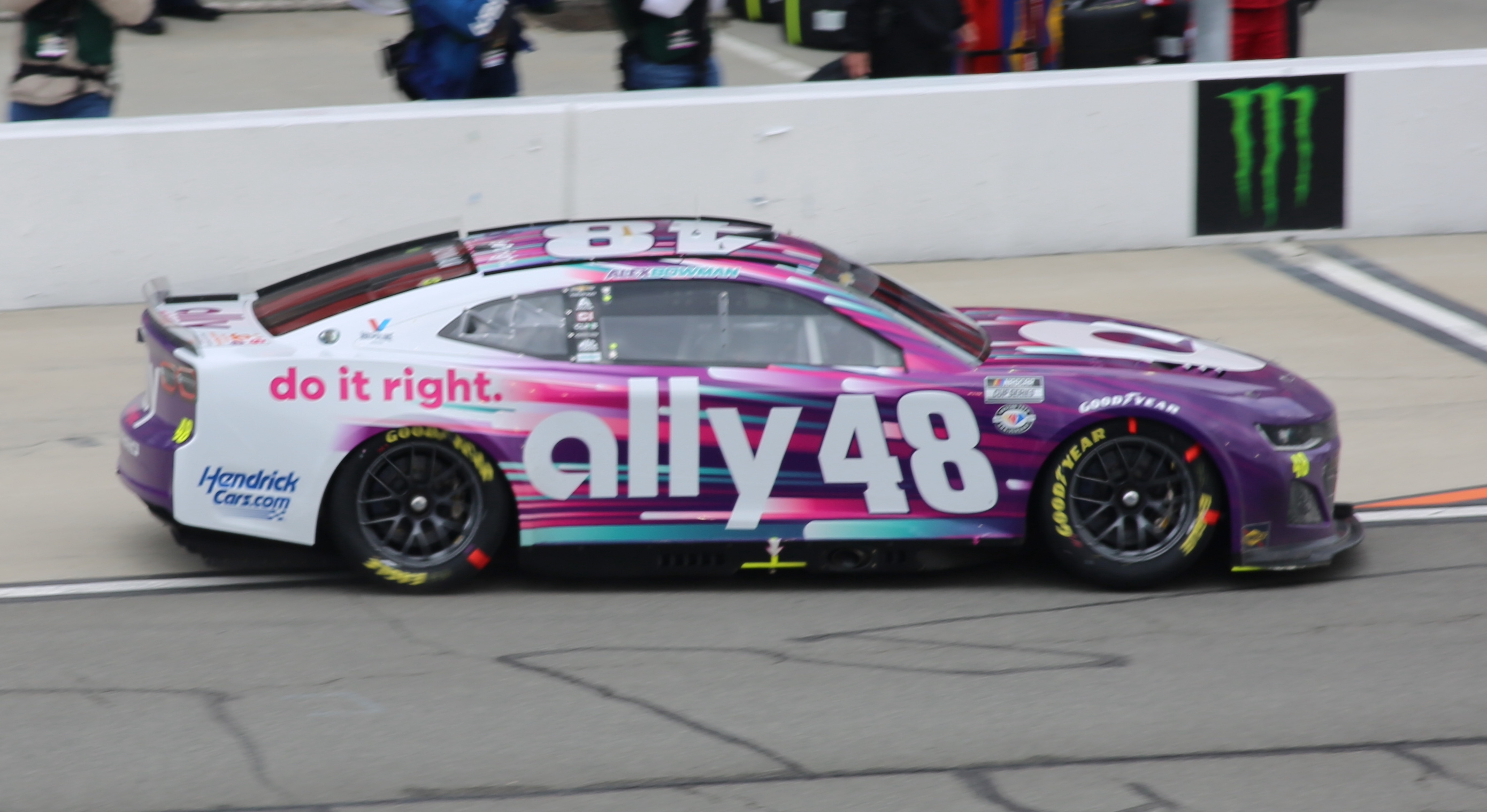
Bowman in the No. 48 at Auto Club Speedway in 2023

Prior to the Daytona 500, Bowman signed a three-year extension to remain with HMS through 2026 with his sponsor Ally Financial signing a five-year extension with HMS as well. Bowman began the 2023 season with a fifth place finish at the 2023 Daytona 500. On March 15, the No. 48 was served an L2 penalty after unapproved hood louvers were found installed on the car during pre-race inspection at Phoenix; as a result, the team was docked one-hundred driver and owner points and ten playoff points. In addition, crew chief Blake Harris was suspended for four races and fined US$100,000. On March 29, the National Motorsports Appeals Panel amended the penalty, upholding the fine and Harris' suspension but restoring the owner, driver, and playoff points. On April 6, the No. 48 was served an L1 penalty after alterations to the car's greenhouse were discovered during post-race inspection following the Richmond race; as a result, the team was docked sixty driver and owner points and five playoff points. In addition, interim crew chief Greg Ives was suspended for two races and fined US$75,000. On April 25, Bowman suffered a back injury from an accident during a sprint car race at West Burlington, Iowa. Josh Berry, who substituted for Chase Elliott earlier in the season, was announced as the relief driver of the No. 48 while Bowman recovered. Bowman returned to Charlotte Motor Speedway for the Coca-Cola 600 and finished twelfth. Also, Bowman announced that he will not race sprint cars to focus on NASCAR and said that he will have Jake Swanson to race for his sprint car team from now on. Due to the races he missed, combined with some poor finishes, Bowman failed to make the playoffs.

2024 Winless streak broken

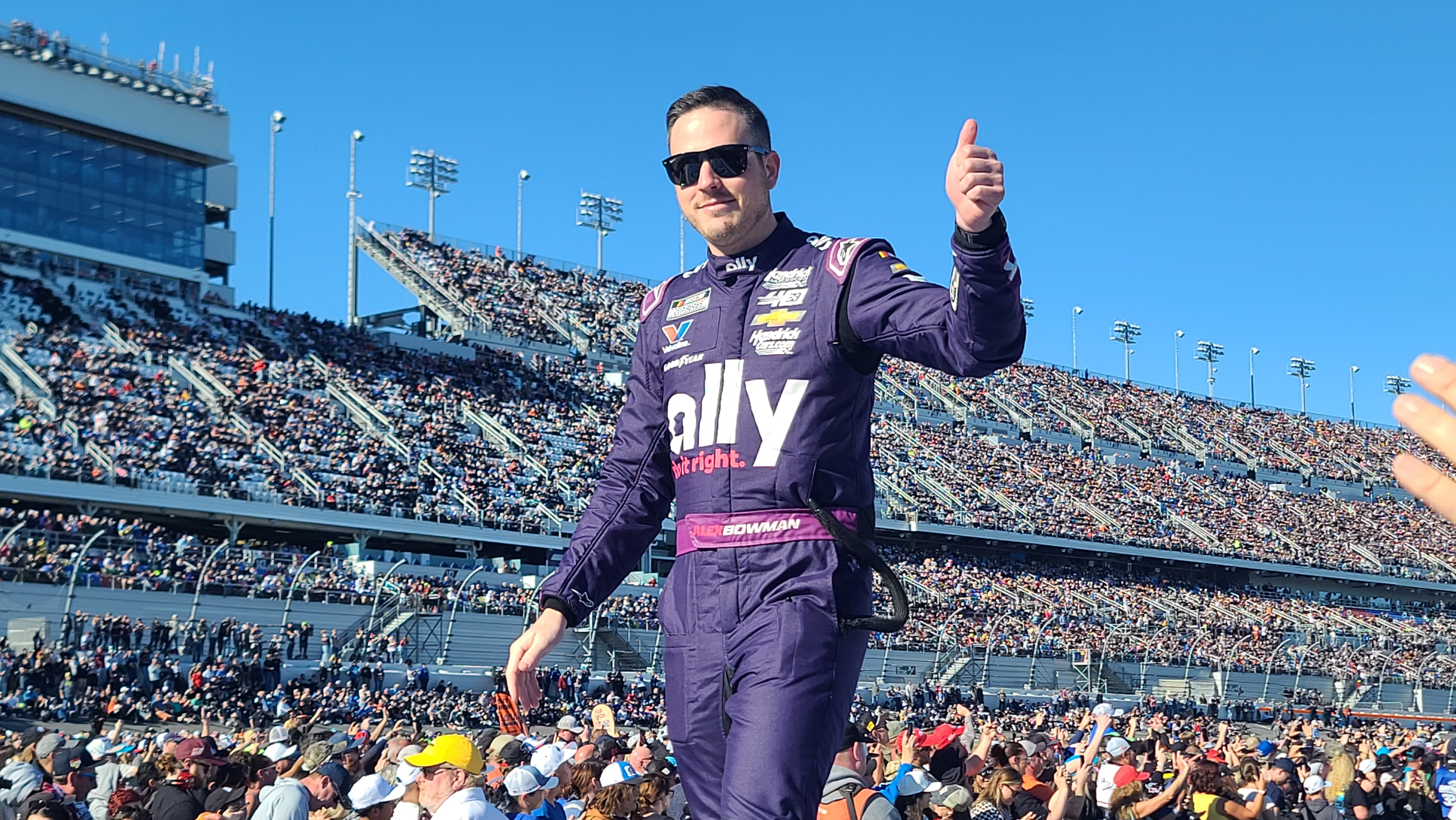
Bowman during driver introductions at the 2024 Daytona 500

Bowman started the 2024 season by finishing second to teammate William Byron at the 2024 Daytona 500. He broke an 80-race drought by winning at the Chicago street race on wet tires after a late-race pass on Joey Hand and held off a charge by Tyler Reddick who was on the faster slicks. Bowman entered the 2024 NASCAR playoffs as the twelfth seed. On September 20, Bowman scored his fifth career Cup Series pole for the playoff race at Bristol the next evening. This is his first pole since the 2016 Fall Phoenix race that is not for a Daytona 500. Through the Round of 16, Bowman earned 120 points, the most of any driver, and advanced to the Round of 12. At the Kansas fall race on September 29, Bowman continued his hot start to the playoffs by winning Stage 2, his first stage win of the season, and earning the fourth-most points in the race. Bowman finished 18th at the Charlotte Roval and would have advanced to the Round of 8, but he was disqualified after his car failed post-race inspection for not meeting minimum weight. As a result, Joey Logano, who would have been eliminated, advanced. Bowman finished the season ninth in the final point standings.

2025 Staying consistent

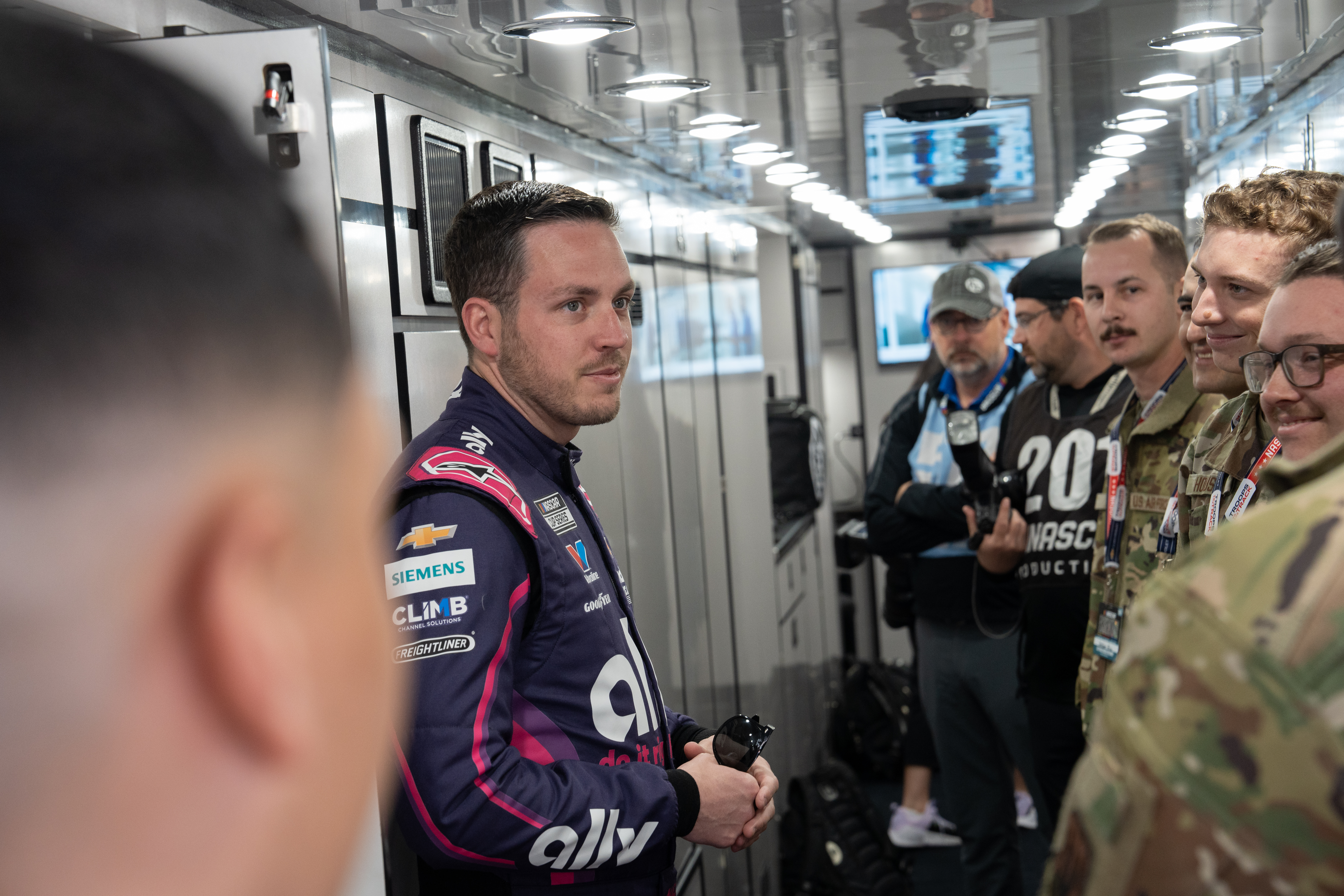
Bowman meeting Creech AFB Airmen before the 2025 Pennzoil 400.

Bowman started his 2025 campaign with a sixth-place finish at the Daytona 500. Bowman would get his sixth career pole and almost a win Homestead. During the closing laps, Larson would catch Bowman would also get a pole at Bristol. Later in the season, at Michigan, Bowman would suffer a hard crash from contact with Cole Custer and would get minor pain in his back and body soreness. He would fight back to finish fourth at Mexico City the following week. Bowman would luckily make the playoffs after Ryan Blaney won the final regular season race at Daytona. Bowman's pit crew was mediocre at Darlington and Gateway. At the 2nd Bristol race, Bowman was in a must-win situation to advance but ended up eliminated with an 8th place finish. Bowman would finish 13th in the final standings.

2026 Uncertain future, early season health concerns

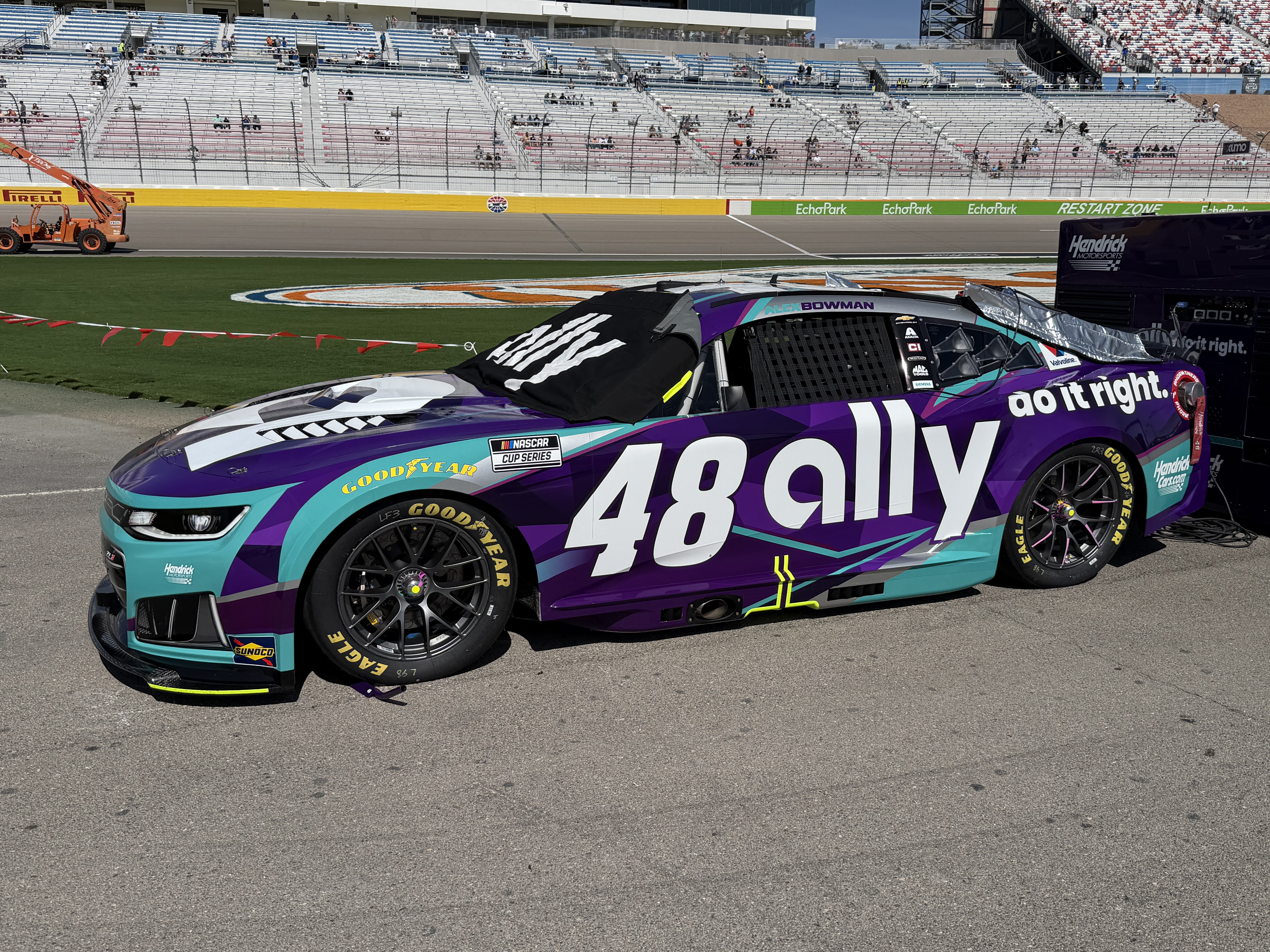
Bowman's car at the 2026 Pennzoil 400.

Bowman came into the 2026 season with his future in the No. 48 uncertain. During the race at Austin, Bowman exited the car at lap 71 due to vertigo; Myatt Snider took over and finished the race. When Bowman's vertigo continued, Anthony Alfredo filled in at Phoenix, and Justin Allgaier at Las Vegas, Darlington and Martinsville. On April 9, it was announced that Bowman was medically cleared and would return to racing at Bristol.

2027 Final full-time season in Cup

On July 23, 2026, Hendrick announced that Bowman would retire from full-time NASCAR competition after the 2027 season.

== Motorsports career results ==
=== Stock car career summary ===
Season	Series	Team	Races	Wins	Top 5	Top 10	Points	Position
2011	NASCAR K&N Pro Series West	Venturini Motorsports	1	0	1	1	318	42nd
2011	NASCAR K&N Pro Series West	X Team Racing	1	0	0	1	318	42nd
2011	NASCAR K&N Pro Series East	X Team Racing	10	0	4	7	1642	6th
2011	NASCAR K&N Pro Series East	Gaunt Brothers Racing	1	0	0	0	1642	6th
2011	ARCA Racing Series	Venturini Motorsports	2	2	2	2	445	55th
2012	ARCA Racing Series	Cunningham Motorsports	19	4	11	13	4725	4th
2012	NASCAR Nationwide Series	Turner Motorsports	2	0	0	0	45	46th
2012	NASCAR Nationwide Series	RAB Racing	2	0	0	0	45	46th
2013	NASCAR Nationwide Series	RAB Racing	32	0	2	6	884	11th
2014	NASCAR Nationwide Series	Hattori Racing Enterprises	1	0	0	0	0	NC†
2014	NASCAR Nationwide Series	JR Motorsports	2	0	0	0	0	NC†
2014	NASCAR Sprint Cup Series	BK Racing	36	0	0	0	412	35th
2015	NASCAR Camping World Truck Series	JR Motorsports	1	0	0	0	0	NC†
2015	NASCAR Xfinity Series	Athenian Motorsports	2	0	0	0	0	NC†
2015	NASCAR Sprint Cup Series	Tommy Baldwin Racing	35	0	0	0	437	33rd
2016	NASCAR Xfinity Series	JR Motorsports	9	0	3	7	273	25th
2016	NASCAR Sprint Cup Series	Hendrick Motorsports	10	0	0	3	0	NC†
2017	NASCAR Camping World Truck Series	GMS Racing	1	0	0	1	0	NC†
2017	NASCAR Xfinity Series	Chip Ganassi Racing	2	1	1	2	0	NC†
2018	NASCAR K&N Pro Series West	Bill McAnally Racing	1	0	0	0	20	61st
2018	NASCAR Xfinity Series	GMS Racing	1	0	0	0	0	NC†
2018	Monster Energy NASCAR Cup Series	Hendrick Motorsports	36	0	3	11	2204	16th
2019	Monster Energy NASCAR Cup Series	Hendrick Motorsports	36	1	7	12	2257	12th
2020	NASCAR Cup Series	Hendrick Motorsports	36	1	6	15	2371	6th
2021	NASCAR Cup Series	Hendrick Motorsports	36	4	8	16	2240	14th
2022	NASCAR Camping World Truck Series	Spire Motorsports	2	0	0	0	0	NC†
2022	NASCAR Xfinity Series	Hendrick Motorsports	1	0	1	1	0	NC†
2022	NASCAR Cup Series	Hendrick Motorsports	31	1	4	12	2107	16th
2023	NASCAR Craftsman Truck Series	Spire Motorsports	0	0	0	0	0	NC†
2023	NASCAR Xfinity Series	Hendrick Motorsports	1	0	0	1	0	NC†
2023	NASCAR Cup Series	Hendrick Motorsports	33	0	4	10	701	20th
2024	NASCAR Xfinity Series	Hendrick Motorsports	1	0	0	1	0	NC†
2024	NASCAR Cup Series	Hendrick Motorsports	36	1	8	17	2318	9th
2025	NASCAR Xfinity Series	Hendrick Motorsports	1	0	1	1	0	NC†
2025	NASCAR Cup Series	Hendrick Motorsports	36	0	6	16	2192	13th
2026	NASCAR Cup Series	Hendrick Motorsports	23	0	3	6	416*	29th*

^{†} As Bowman was a guest driver, he was ineligible for championship points.

=== NASCAR ===
(key) (Bold – Pole position awarded by qualifying time. Italics – Pole position earned by points standings or practice time. * – Most laps led.)

==== Cup Series ====
NASCAR Cup Series results
Year	Team	No.	Make	1	2	3	4	5	6	7	8	9	10	11	12	13	14	15	16	17	18	19	20	21	22	23	24	25	26	27	28	29	30	31	32	33	34	35	36	NCSC	Pts	Ref
2014	BK Racing	23	Toyota	DAY; 23	PHO; 41	LVS; 37	BRI; 32	CAL; 22	MAR; 36	TEX; 32	DAR; 29	RCH; 28	TAL; 28	KAN; 35	CLT; 33	DOV; 40	POC; 31	MCH; 40	SON; 29	KEN; 36	DAY; 13	NHA; 31	IND; 40	POC; 31	GLN; 36	MCH; 26	BRI; 32	ATL; 35	RCH; 38	CHI; 35	NHA; 28	DOV; 34	KAN; 32	CLT; 30	TAL; 43	MAR; 29	TEX; 42	PHO; 32	HOM; 33	35th	412	
2015	Tommy Baldwin Racing	7	Chevy	DAY; DNQ	ATL; 23	LVS; 43	PHO; 30	CAL; 33	MAR; 37	TEX; 33	BRI; 20	RCH; 32	TAL; 16	KAN; 43	CLT; 26	DOV; 20	POC; 26	MCH; 41	SON; 31	DAY; 24	KEN; 31	NHA; 42	IND; 43	POC; 25	GLN; 29	MCH; 31	BRI; 32	DAR; 24	RCH; 37	CHI; 37	NHA; 42	DOV; 32	CLT; 32	KAN; 31	TAL; 33	MAR; 22	TEX; 41	PHO; 38	HOM; 26	33rd	437	
2016	Hendrick Motorsports	88	Chevy	DAY	ATL	LVS	PHO	CAL	MAR	TEX	BRI	RCH	TAL	KAN	DOV	CLT	POC	MCH	SON	DAY	KEN	NHA; 26	IND	POC	GLN	BRI	MCH; 30	DAR	RCH	CHI; 10	NHA; 14	DOV	CLT; 39	KAN; 7	TAL; 36	MAR	TEX; 13	**PHO**; 6*	HOM; 16	52nd	0^{1}	
2018	Hendrick Motorsports	88	Chevy	**DAY**; 17	ATL; 20	LVS; 16	PHO; 13	CAL; 13	MAR; 7	TEX; 28	BRI; 5	RCH; 18	TAL; 8	DOV; 23	KAN; 18	CLT; 9	POC; 27	MCH; 16	SON; 9	CHI; 10	DAY; 10	KEN; 39	NHA; 11	POC; 3	GLN; 14	MCH; 19	BRI; 8	DAR; 23	IND; 33	LVS; 19	RCH; 12	ROV; 4	DOV; 28	TAL; 33	KAN; 9	MAR; 17	TEX; 14	PHO; 30	HOM; 29	16th	2204	
2019	Hendrick Motorsports	88	Chevy	DAY; 11	ATL; 15	LVS; 11	PHO; 35	CAL; 21	MAR; 14	TEX; 18	BRI; 23	RCH; 17	TAL; 2	DOV; 2	KAN; 2	CLT; 7	POC; 15	MCH; 10	SON; 14	CHI; 1	DAY; 21	KEN; 17	NHA; 14	POC; 20	GLN; 14	MCH; 10	BRI; 15	DAR; 18	IND; 21	LVS; 6	RCH; 23	ROV; 2	DOV; 3	TAL; 37	KAN; 11	MAR; 30	TEX; 5	PHO; 23	HOM; 9	12th	2257	
2020	Hendrick Motorsports	88	Chevy	DAY; 24	LVS; 13	CAL; 1*	PHO; 14	DAR; 2	DAR; 18	CLT; 19*	CLT; 31	BRI; 37	ATL; 12	MAR; 6	HOM; 18	TAL; 7	POC; 27	POC; 9	IND; 30	KEN; 19	TEX; 30	KAN; 8	NHA; 15	MCH; 21	MCH; 36	DRC; 12	DOV; 21	DOV; 5	DAY; 7	DAR; 6	RCH; 9	BRI; 16	LVS; 5	TAL; 14	ROV; 8	KAN; 3	TEX; 5	MAR; 6	PHO; 16	6th	2371	
2021	Hendrick Motorsports	48	Chevy	**DAY**; 35	DRC; 10	HOM; 9	LVS; 27	PHO; 13	ATL; 3	BRD; 22	MAR; 34	RCH; 1	TAL; 38	KAN; 18	DAR; 17	DOV; 1	COA; 8	CLT; 5	SON; 9	NSH; 14	POC; 1	POC; 7	ROA; 22	ATL; 4	NHA; 9	GLN; 20	IRC; 17	MCH; 16	DAY; 7	DAR; 26	RCH; 12	BRI; 5	LVS; 22	TAL; 38	ROV; 10	TEX; 33	KAN; 11	MAR; 1	PHO; 18	14th	2240	
2022	Hendrick Motorsports	48	Chevy	DAY; 24	CAL; 25	LVS; 1	PHO; 14	ATL; 10	COA; 2	RCH; 8	MAR; 12	BRD; 6	TAL; 9	DOV; 5	DAR; 29	KAN; 9	CLT; 10	GTW; 13	SON; 16	NSH; 36	ROA; 12	ATL; 32	NHA; 35	POC; 11	IRC; 32	MCH; 9	RCH; 20	GLN; 14	DAY; 14	DAR; 10	KAN; 4*	BRI; 32	TEX; 29	TAL	ROV	LVS	HOM	MAR	PHO; 34	16th	2107	
2023	Hendrick Motorsports	48	Chevy	**DAY**; 5	CAL; 8	LVS; 3	PHO; 9	ATL; 14	COA; 3	RCH; 8	BRD; 29	MAR; 11	TAL; 13	DOV	KAN	DAR	CLT; 12	GTW; 26	SON; 15	NSH; 17	CSC; 37	ATL; 26	NHA; 14	POC; 24	RCH; 18	MCH; 33	IRC; 5	GLN; 23	DAY; 6	DAR; 33	KAN; 10	BRI; 13	TEX; 12	TAL; 28	ROV; 8	LVS; 35	HOM; 19	MAR; 32	PHO; 17	20th	701	
2024	Hendrick Motorsports	48	Chevy	DAY; 2	ATL; 27	LVS; 18	PHO; 20	BRI; 4	COA; 4	RCH; 17	MAR; 8	TEX; 37	TAL; 5	DOV; 8	KAN; 7	DAR; 8	CLT; 9	GTW; 28	SON; 15	IOW; 8	NHA; 36	NSH; 14	CSC; 1	POC; 3	IND; 31	RCH; 28	MCH; 27	DAY; 16	DAR; 19	ATL; 5	GLN; 18	**BRI**; 9	KAN; 6	TAL; 16	ROV; 38	LVS; 5	HOM; 7	MAR; 13	PHO; 14	9th	2318	
2025	Hendrick Motorsports	48	Chevy	DAY; 6	ATL; 26	COA; 9	PHO; 7	LVS; 7	**HOM**; 2	MAR; 27	DAR; 35	**BRI**; 37	TAL; 7	TEX; 35	KAN; 5	CLT; 29	NSH; 36	MCH; 36	MXC; 4	POC; 11	ATL; 3	CSC; 8	SON; 19	DOV; 3	IND; 9	IOW; 7	GLN; 20	RCH; 2	DAY; 36	DAR; 31	GTW; 26	BRI; 8	NHA; 15	KAN; 28	ROV; 18	LVS; 7	TAL; 29	MAR; 23	PHO; 15	13th	2192	
2026	Hendrick Motorsports	48	Chevy	DAY; 40	ATL; 23	COA; 36	PHO	LVS	DAR	MAR	BRI; 37	KAN; 18	TAL; 3	TEX; 3	GLN; 25	CLT; 17	NSH; 33	MCH; 19	POC; 27	COR; 26	SON; 10	CHI; 5	ATL; 22	NWS; 26	IND; 19	IOW; 34	RCH; 10	NHA; 15	DAY; 8	DAR; 12	GTW; 2	BRI; 35	KAN; 18	LVS; 11	CLT; 38	PHO; 29	TAL; 9	MAR; 13	HOM; 16	26th	594	

===== Daytona 500 =====
Year	Team	Manufacturer	Start	Finish
2014	BK Racing	Toyota	29	23
2015	Tommy Baldwin Racing	Chevrolet	DNQ	
2018	Hendrick Motorsports	Chevrolet	**1**	17
2019	Hendrick Motorsports	Chevrolet	2	11
2020	Hendrick Motorsports	Chevrolet	2	24
2021	Hendrick Motorsports	Chevrolet	**1**	35
2022	Hendrick Motorsports	Chevrolet	2	24
2023	Hendrick Motorsports	Chevrolet	**1**	5
2024	Hendrick Motorsports	Chevrolet	7	2
2025	Hendrick Motorsports	Chevrolet	38	6
2026	Hendrick Motorsports	Chevrolet	21	40

==== Xfinity Series ====
NASCAR Xfinity Series results
Year	Team	No.	Make	1	2	3	4	5	6	7	8	9	10	11	12	13	14	15	16	17	18	19	20	21	22	23	24	25	26	27	28	29	30	31	32	33	NXSC	Pts	Ref
2012	Turner Motorsports	30	Chevy	DAY	PHO	LVS	BRI	CAL	TEX	RCH	TAL	DAR	IOW	CLT	DOV	MCH	ROA	KEN	DAY	NHA	CHI	IND	IOW	GLN	CGV	BRI	ATL	RCH	CHI; 17		DOV; 19	CLT	KAN	TEX			46th	45	
2012	RAB Racing	99	Toyota																											KEN; 25					PHO; 15	HOM	46th	45	
2013	RAB Racing	99	Toyota	DAY; 3	PHO; 31	LVS; 8	BRI; 14	CAL; 12	**TEX**; 14	RCH; 27	TAL; 13	DAR; 17	CLT; 20	DOV; 17	IOW; 22	MCH; 14	ROA; 24	KEN; 10	DAY; 20	NHA; 10	CHI; 31	IND; 15	IOW; 7	GLN; 13	MOH; 11	BRI; 33	ATL; 34	RCH; 15	CHI; 11	KEN; 5	DOV; 18	KAN; 11	CLT; 18	**TEX**; 18	PHO; 11	HOM	11th	884	
2014	Hattori Racing Enterprises	80	Toyota	DAY	PHO	LVS	BRI	CAL	TEX	DAR	RCH	TAL	IOW	CLT	DOV	MCH	ROA	KEN	DAY	NHA	CHI	IND	IOW	GLN	MOH	BRI	ATL	RCH	CHI	KEN	DOV; 19	KAN					97th	0^{1}	
2014	JR Motorsports	5	Chevy																														CLT; 12	TEX	PHO; 17	HOM	97th	0^{1}	
2015	Athenian Motorsports	25	Chevy	DAY	ATL	LVS	PHO	CAL	TEX	BRI	RCH	TAL	IOW	CLT	DOV	MCH; 14	CHI	DAY	KEN	NHA	IND; 17	IOW	GLN	MOH	BRI	ROA	DAR	RCH	CHI	KEN	DOV	CLT	KAN	TEX	PHO	HOM	101st	0^{1}	
2016	JR Motorsports	88	Chevy	DAY	ATL	LVS	PHO	CAL	TEX	BRI	RCH	TAL	DOV; 3	CLT	POC; 10	**MCH**; 7	IOW; 5	DAY	KEN	NHA; 8	IND	IOW	GLN	MOH	BRI	ROA	DAR	RCH; 9	CHI	KEN	DOV; 5	CLT	KAN	TEX	PHO; 38	HOM; 14	25th	273	
2017	Chip Ganassi Racing	42	Chevy	DAY	ATL	LVS	PHO	CAL	TEX	BRI	RCH	TAL	CLT	DOV	POC	MCH	IOW	DAY	KEN	NHA	IND	IOW	GLN	MOH	BRI	ROA	DAR	RCH	CHI	KEN	DOV	CLT; 1	KAN	TEX	PHO; 8	HOM	92nd	0^{1}	
2018	GMS Racing	23	Chevy	DAY	ATL	LVS	PHO	CAL	TEX	BRI	RCH	TAL	DOV	CLT	POC	MCH; 21	IOW	CHI	DAY	KEN	NHA	IOW	GLN	MOH	BRI	ROA	DAR	IND	LVS	RCH	ROV	DOV	KAN	TEX	PHO	HOM	104th	0^{1}	
2022	Hendrick Motorsports	17	Chevy	DAY	CAL	LVS	PHO	ATL	COA	RCH	MAR	TAL	DOV	DAR	TEX	CLT	PIR	NSH	ROA	ATL	NHA	POC	IRC; 2	MCH	GLN	DAY	DAR	KAN	BRI	TEX	TAL	ROV	LVS	HOM	MAR	PHO	80th	0^{1}	
2023	Hendrick Motorsports	17	Chevy	DAY	CAL	LVS	PHO	ATL	COA	RCH	MAR	TAL	DOV	DAR	CLT	PIR	SON	NSH	CSC	ATL	NHA	POC	ROA	MCH	IRC	GLN; 9	DAY	DAR	KAN	BRI	TEX	ROV	LVS	HOM	MAR	PHO	87th	0^{1}	
2024	Hendrick Motorsports	17	Chevy	DAY	ATL	LVS	PHO	COA	RCH	MAR	TEX	TAL	DOV	DAR	CLT	PIR	SON	IOW	NHA; 9	NSH	CSC	POC	IND	MCH	DAY	DAR	ATL	GLN	BRI	KAN	TAL	ROV	LVS	HOM	MAR	PHO	92nd	0^{1}	
2025	Hendrick Motorsports	17	Chevy	DAY	ATL	COA	**PHO**; 2	LVS	HOM	MAR	DAR	BRI	CAR	TAL	TEX	CLT	NSH	MXC	POC	ATL	CSC	SON	DOV	IND	IOW	GLN	DAY	PIR	GTW	BRI	KAN	ROV	LVS	TAL	MAR	PHO	79th	0^{1}	

==== Craftsman Truck Series ====
NASCAR Craftsman Truck Series results
Year	Team	No.	Make	1	2	3	4	5	6	7	8	9	10	11	12	13	14	15	16	17	18	19	20	21	22	23	NCTC	Pts	Ref
2015	JR Motorsports	00	Chevy	DAY	ATL	MAR	KAN	CLT	DOV	TEX	GTW	IOW	KEN	ELD	POC	MCH; 11	BRI	MSP	CHI	NHA	LVS	TAL	MAR	TEX	PHO	HOM	95th	0^{1}	
2017	GMS Racing	24	Chevy	DAY	ATL; 6	MAR	KAN	CLT	DOV	TEX	GTW	IOW	KEN	ELD	POC	MCH	BRI	MSP	CHI	NHA	LVS	TAL	MAR	TEX	PHO	HOM	79th	0^{1}	
2022	Spire Motorsports	7	Chevy	DAY	LVS	ATL	COA; 25	MAR	BRD	DAR	KAN	TEX	CLT	GTW	SON; 29	KNX	NSH	MOH	POC	IRP	RCH	KAN	BRI	TAL	HOM	PHO	101st	0^{1}	
2023	Spire Motorsports	7	Chevy	DAY	LVS	ATL	COA; DNQ	TEX	BRD	MAR	KAN	DAR	NWS	CLT	GTW	NSH	MOH	POC	RCH	IRP	MLW	KAN	BRI	TAL	HOM	PHO	115th	0^{1}	

^{*} Season still in progress
^{1} Ineligible for series points

=== ARCA Menards Series ===
(key) (Bold – Pole position awarded by qualifying time. Italics – Pole position earned by points standings or practice time. * – Most laps led.)

ARCA Menards Series results
Year	Team	No.	Make	1	2	3	4	5	6	7	8	9	10	11	12	13	14	15	16	17	18	19	20	ARSC	Pts	Ref
2011	Venturini Motorsports	55	Toyota	DAY	TAL	SLM	TOL	NJE	CHI	POC	MCH	WIN	BLN	IOW	IRP	POC	ISF	MAD; 1	DSF	SLM	KAN; 1	TOL		55th	445	
2012	Cunningham Motorsports	22	Dodge	DAY; 30	**MOB**; 3	SLM; 1*	TAL; 32	**TOL**; 9	**ELK**; 11	POC; 3	MCH; 2	WIN; 1	NJE; 13	IOW; 1*	CHI; 8	IRP; 22	POC; 3	BLN; 13	**ISF**; 2	**MAD**; 2	SLM; 5	DSF; C	**KAN**; 1*	4th	4725	

==== K&N Pro Series East ====
NASCAR K&N Pro Series East results
Year	Team	No.	Make	1	2	3	4	5	6	7	8	9	10	11	12	NKNPSEC	Pts	Ref
2011	X Team Racing	16	Toyota	GRE; 3	SBO; 8	RCH; 5		BGS; 12		LGY; 6			GRE; 4		DOV; 23	6th	1642	
2011	X Team Racing	76	Toyota				IOW; 27									6th	1642	
2011	Gaunt Brothers Racing	75	Toyota						JFC; 24							6th	1642	
2011	X Team Racing	59	Toyota								NHA; 6	COL; 2		NHA; 12		6th	1642	

==== K&N Pro Series West ====
NASCAR K&N Pro Series West results
Year	Team	No.	Make	1	2	3	4	5	6	7	8	9	10	11	12	13	14	NKNPSWC	Pts	Ref
2011	X Team Racing	59	Toyota	PHO	AAS	MMP	IOW	LVS	SON	IRW	EVG	PIR	CNS; 9	MRP	SPO	AAS		42nd	318	
2011	Venturini Motorsports	25	Toyota														PHO; 2	42nd	318	
2018	Bill McAnally Racing	24	Chevy	KCR	TUS	TUS	OSS	CNS	SON; 24	DCS	IOW	EVG	GTW	LVS	MER	AAS	KCR	61st	20	
