= 2019 Toyota/Save Mart 350 =

Race details
- Race 16 of 36 in the 2019 Monster Energy NASCAR Cup Series
- Date: June 23, 2019
- Location: Sonoma Raceway in Sonoma, California
- Course: Permanent racing facility
- Course length: 2.52 miles (4.06 km)
- Distance: 90 laps, 226.8 mi (364.999 km)
- Average speed: 83.922 miles per hour (135.059 km/h)

Pole position
Driver	Kyle Larson	Chip Ganassi Racing
- Time: 94.784

Most laps led
Driver	Martin Truex Jr.	Joe Gibbs Racing
- Laps: 59

Winner
No. 19	Martin Truex Jr.	Joe Gibbs Racing

Television in the United States
- Network: FS1
- Announcers: Mike Joy, Jeff Gordon and Darrell Waltrip
- Nielsen ratings: 2.478 million

Radio in the United States
- Radio: PRN
- Booth announcers: Doug Rice and Mark Garrow
- Turn announcers: Pat Patterson (2, 3 & 3a), Brad Gillie (4a & 7a) Doug Turnbull (8 & 9) and Rob Albright (10 & 11)

The 2019 Toyota/Save Mart 350 was a Monster Energy NASCAR Cup Series race held on June 23, 2019 at Sonoma Raceway in Sonoma, California. Contested over 90 laps on the 2.52-mile (4.06 km) road course, it was the 16th race of the 2019 Monster Energy NASCAR Cup Series season.

The race was won by its defending champion Martin Truex Jr., marking his third overall victory at Sonoma. Truex also set the event's fastest average speed.

== Report ==
=== Background ===
Layout of Sonoma Raceway, the track where the race was held.

Sonoma Raceway, formerly Sears Point Raceway and Infineon Raceway is a 2.52-mile (4.06 km) road course and drag strip located on the landform known as Sears Point in the southern Sonoma Mountains in Sonoma, California, USA. The road course features 12 turns on a hilly course with 160 feet (49 m) of total elevation change. It is host to one of only three Monster Energy NASCAR Cup Series races each year that are run on road courses (the others being Watkins Glen International in Watkins Glen, New York and the road course layout for the Bank of America 500 at Charlotte Motor Speedway). It is also host to the NTT IndyCar Series and several other auto races and motorcycle races such as the American Federation of Motorcyclists series. Sonoma Raceway continues to host amateur, or club racing events which may or may not be open to the general public. The largest such car club is the Sports Car Club of America.

==== Entry list ====
- (i) denotes driver who are ineligible for series driver points.
- (R) denotes rookie driver.

No.	Driver	Team	Manufacturer
00	Landon Cassill (i)	StarCom Racing	Chevrolet
1	Kurt Busch	Chip Ganassi Racing	Chevrolet
2	Brad Keselowski	Team Penske	Ford
3	Austin Dillon	Richard Childress Racing	Chevrolet
4	Kevin Harvick	Stewart-Haas Racing	Ford
6	Ryan Newman	Roush Fenway Racing	Ford
8	Daniel Hemric (R)	Richard Childress Racing	Chevrolet
9	Chase Elliott	Hendrick Motorsports	Chevrolet
10	Aric Almirola	Stewart-Haas Racing	Ford
11	Denny Hamlin	Joe Gibbs Racing	Toyota
12	Ryan Blaney	Team Penske	Ford
13	Ty Dillon	Germain Racing	Chevrolet
14	Clint Bowyer	Stewart-Haas Racing	Ford
15	Ross Chastain (i)	Premium Motorsports	Chevrolet
17	Ricky Stenhouse Jr.	Roush Fenway Racing	Ford
18	Kyle Busch	Joe Gibbs Racing	Toyota
19	Martin Truex Jr.	Joe Gibbs Racing	Toyota
20	Erik Jones	Joe Gibbs Racing	Toyota
21	Paul Menard	Wood Brothers Racing	Ford
22	Joey Logano	Team Penske	Ford
24	William Byron	Hendrick Motorsports	Chevrolet
27	Reed Sorenson	Premium Motorsports	Chevrolet
32	Corey LaJoie	Go Fas Racing	Ford
34	Michael McDowell	Front Row Motorsports	Ford
36	Matt Tifft (R)	Front Row Motorsports	Ford
37	Chris Buescher	JTG Daugherty Racing	Chevrolet
38	David Ragan	Front Row Motorsports	Ford
41	Daniel Suárez	Stewart-Haas Racing	Ford
42	Kyle Larson	Chip Ganassi Racing	Chevrolet
43	Bubba Wallace	Richard Petty Motorsports	Chevrolet
47	Ryan Preece (R)	JTG Daugherty Racing	Chevrolet
48	Jimmie Johnson	Hendrick Motorsports	Chevrolet
51	J. J. Yeley	Petty Ware Racing	Chevrolet
52	Cody Ware (i)	Rick Ware Racing	Chevrolet
77	Justin Haley (i)	Spire Motorsports	Chevrolet
88	Alex Bowman	Hendrick Motorsports	Chevrolet
95	Matt DiBenedetto	Leavine Family Racing	Toyota
96	Parker Kligerman (i)	Gaunt Brothers Racing	Toyota
Official entry list

== Practice ==
=== First practice ===
Martin Truex Jr. was the fastest in the first practice session with a time of 95.168 seconds and a speed of 95.326 mph (153.412 km/h).

Pos	No.	Driver	Team	Manufacturer	Time	Speed
1	19	Martin Truex Jr.	Joe Gibbs Racing	Toyota	95.168	95.326
2	12	Ryan Blaney	Team Penske	Ford	95.299	95.195
3	37	Chris Buescher	JTG Daugherty Racing	Chevrolet	95.454	95.041
Official first practice results

=== Final practice ===
Kyle Larson was the fastest in the final practice session with a time of 95.026 seconds and a speed of 95.469 mph (153.642 km/h).

Pos	No.	Driver	Team	Manufacturer	Time	Speed
1	42	Kyle Larson	Chip Ganassi Racing	Chevrolet	95.026	95.469
2	1	Kurt Busch	Chip Ganassi Racing	Chevrolet	95.509	94.986
3	10	Aric Almirola	Stewart-Haas Racing	Ford	96.080	94.421
Official final practice results

== Qualifying ==
Kyle Larson scored the pole for the race with a time of 94.784 and a speed of 95.712 mph (154.034 km/h).

=== Qualifying results ===
Pos	No.	Driver	Team	Manufacturer	R1	R2
1	42	Kyle Larson	Chip Ganassi Racing	Chevrolet	94.598	94.784
2	24	William Byron	Hendrick Motorsports	Chevrolet	94.809	94.827
3	22	Joey Logano	Team Penske	Ford	94.812	94.878
4	9	Chase Elliott	Hendrick Motorsports	Chevrolet	95.247	94.898
5	41	Daniel Suárez	Stewart-Haas Racing	Ford	94.716	95.260
6	11	Denny Hamlin	Joe Gibbs Racing	Toyota	95.209	95.287
7	18	Kyle Busch	Joe Gibbs Racing	Toyota	95.202	95.367
8	19	Martin Truex Jr.	Joe Gibbs Racing	Toyota	95.350	95.399
9	12	Ryan Blaney	Team Penske	Ford	95.173	95.507
10	37	Chris Buescher	JTG Daugherty Racing	Chevrolet	95.189	95.668
11	48	Jimmie Johnson	Hendrick Motorsports	Chevrolet	95.256	96.156
12	88	Alex Bowman	Hendrick Motorsports	Chevrolet	95.208	96.374
13	34	Michael McDowell	Front Row Motorsports	Ford	95.449	—
14	14	Clint Bowyer	Stewart-Haas Racing	Ford	95.485	—
15	10	Aric Almirola	Stewart-Haas Racing	Ford	95.624	—
16	1	Kurt Busch	Chip Ganassi Racing	Chevrolet	95.746	—
17	17	Ricky Stenhouse Jr.	Roush Fenway Racing	Ford	95.749	—
18	38	David Ragan	Front Row Motorsports	Ford	95.821	—
19	95	Matt DiBenedetto	Leavine Family Racing	Toyota	95.926	—
20	47	Ryan Preece (R)	JTG Daugherty Racing	Chevrolet	96.070	—
21	6	Ryan Newman	Roush Fenway Racing	Ford	96.106	—
22	2	Brad Keselowski	Team Penske	Ford	96.118	—
23	4	Kevin Harvick	Stewart-Haas Racing	Ford	96.130	—
24	21	Paul Menard	Wood Brothers Racing	Ford	96.281	—
25	8	Daniel Hemric (R)	Richard Childress Racing	Chevrolet	96.294	—
26	3	Austin Dillon	Richard Childress Racing	Chevrolet	96.457	—
27	32	Corey LaJoie	Go Fas Racing	Ford	96.484	—
28	36	Matt Tifft (R)	Front Row Motorsports	Ford	96.781	—
29	96	Parker Kligerman (i)	Gaunt Brothers Racing	Toyota	97.006	—
30	43	Bubba Wallace	Richard Petty Motorsports	Chevrolet	97.020	—
31	13	Ty Dillon	Germain Racing	Chevrolet	97.040	—
32	20	Erik Jones	Joe Gibbs Racing	Toyota	97.530	—
33	77	Justin Haley (i)	Spire Motorsports	Chevrolet	97.911	—
34	52	Cody Ware (i)	Rick Ware Racing	Chevrolet	98.432	—
35	00	Landon Cassill (i)	StarCom Racing	Chevrolet	98.719	—
36	51	J. J. Yeley	Petty Ware Racing	Chevrolet	99.161	—
37	15	Kyle Weatherman (i)	Premium Motorsports	Chevrolet	102.283	—
38	27	Reed Sorenson	Premium Motorsports	Chevrolet	0.000	—
Official qualifying results

- Kyle Weatherman practiced and qualified the No. 15 for Ross Chastain, who was in Gateway for the Truck Series race.

== Race ==
=== Stage results ===
Stage One Laps: 20

Pos	No	Driver	Team	Manufacturer	Points
1	24	William Byron	Hendrick Motorsports	Chevrolet	10
2	11	Denny Hamlin	Joe Gibbs Racing	Toyota	9
3	22	Joey Logano	Team Penske	Ford	8
4	42	Kyle Larson	Chip Ganassi Racing	Chevrolet	7
5	10	Aric Almirola	Stewart-Haas Racing	Ford	6
6	37	Chris Buescher	JTG Daugherty Racing	Chevrolet	5
7	88	Alex Bowman	Hendrick Motorsports	Chevrolet	4
8	4	Kevin Harvick	Stewart-Haas Racing	Ford	3
9	21	Paul Menard	Wood Brothers Racing	Ford	2
10	48	Jimmie Johnson	Hendrick Motorsports	Chevrolet	1
Official stage one results

Stage Two Laps: 20

Pos	No	Driver	Team	Manufacturer	Points
1	11	Denny Hamlin	Joe Gibbs Racing	Toyota	10
2	2	Brad Keselowski	Team Penske	Ford	9
3	24	William Byron	Hendrick Motorsports	Chevrolet	8
4	22	Joey Logano	Team Penske	Ford	7
5	17	Ricky Stenhouse Jr.	Roush Fenway Racing	Ford	6
6	42	Kyle Larson	Chip Ganassi Racing	Chevrolet	5
7	19	Martin Truex Jr.	Joe Gibbs Racing	Toyota	4
8	9	Chase Elliott	Hendrick Motorsports	Chevrolet	3
9	18	Kyle Busch	Joe Gibbs Racing	Toyota	2
10	43	Bubba Wallace	Richard Petty Motorsports	Chevrolet	1
Official stage two results

=== Final stage results ===
Stage Three Laps: 50

Pos	Grid	No	Driver	Team	Manufacturer	Laps	Points
1	8	19	Martin Truex Jr.	Joe Gibbs Racing	Toyota	90	44
2	7	18	Kyle Busch	Joe Gibbs Racing	Toyota	90	37
3	9	12	Ryan Blaney	Team Penske	Ford	90	34
4	19	95	Matt DiBenedetto	Leavine Family Racing	Toyota	90	33
5	6	11	Denny Hamlin	Joe Gibbs Racing	Toyota	90	51
6	23	4	Kevin Harvick	Stewart-Haas Racing	Ford	90	34
7	21	6	Ryan Newman	Roush Fenway Racing	Ford	90	30
8	32	20	Erik Jones	Joe Gibbs Racing	Toyota	90	29
9	15	10	Aric Almirola	Stewart-Haas Racing	Ford	90	34
10	1	42	Kyle Larson	Chip Ganassi Racing	Chevrolet	90	39
11	14	14	Clint Bowyer	Stewart-Haas Racing	Ford	90	26
12	11	48	Jimmie Johnson	Hendrick Motorsports	Chevrolet	90	26
13	16	1	Kurt Busch	Chip Ganassi Racing	Chevrolet	90	24
14	12	88	Alex Bowman	Hendrick Motorsports	Chevrolet	90	27
15	25	8	Daniel Hemric (R)	Richard Childress Racing	Chevrolet	90	22
16	10	37	Chris Buescher	JTG Daugherty Racing	Chevrolet	90	26
17	5	41	Daniel Suárez	Stewart-Haas Racing	Ford	90	20
18	22	2	Brad Keselowski	Team Penske	Ford	90	28
19	2	24	William Byron	Hendrick Motorsports	Chevrolet	90	36
20	18	38	David Ragan	Front Row Motorsports	Ford	90	17
21	17	17	Ricky Stenhouse Jr.	Roush Fenway Racing	Ford	90	22
22	24	21	Paul Menard	Wood Brothers Racing	Ford	90	17
23	3	22	Joey Logano	Team Penske	Ford	90	29
24	26	3	Austin Dillon	Richard Childress Racing	Chevrolet	90	13
25	13	34	Michael McDowell	Front Row Motorsports	Ford	89	12
26	30	43	Bubba Wallace	Richard Petty Motorsports	Chevrolet	89	12
27	31	13	Ty Dillon	Germain Racing	Chevrolet	89	10
28	28	36	Matt Tifft (R)	Front Row Motorsports	Ford	89	9
29	20	47	Ryan Preece (R)	JTG Daugherty Racing	Chevrolet	89	8
30	29	96	Parker Kligerman (i)	Gaunt Brothers Racing	Toyota	89	0
31	35	00	Landon Cassill (i)	StarCom Racing	Chevrolet	89	0
32	27	32	Corey LaJoie	Go Fas Racing	Ford	89	5
33	37	15	Ross Chastain (i)	Premium Motorsports	Chevrolet	89	0
34	33	77	Justin Haley (i)	Spire Motorsports	Chevrolet	88	0
35	38	27	Reed Sorenson	Premium Motorsports	Chevrolet	88	2
36	34	52	Cody Ware (i)	Rick Ware Racing	Chevrolet	64	0
37	4	9	Chase Elliott	Hendrick Motorsports	Chevrolet	60	4
38	36	51	J. J. Yeley	Petty Ware Racing	Chevrolet	53	1
Official race results

=== Race statistics ===
- Lead changes: 7 among 5 different drivers
- Cautions/Laps: 2 for 6
- Red flags: 0
- Time of race: 2 hours, 42 minutes and 9 seconds
- Average speed: 83.922 miles per hour (135.059 km/h)

== Media ==
=== Television ===
The race was televised by FS1, as Fox's final Cup Series event of the season. It also marked Darrell Waltrip's final race as a full-time broadcaster, retiring after a 19-year career spent exclusively at Fox (although he has since made spot appearances, with the April 2022 Bristol round being one). Several drivers (particularly those who share numbers that Waltrip had used during his racing career) ran commemorative paint schemes paying tribute to Waltrip, with Matt DiBenedetto using a design inspired by Waltrip's Terminal Transport #95 from the 1970s, David Ragan using a design inspired by Waltrip's "chrome car" from 1997 (which Waltrip employed as part of his 25th anniversary season), and Ricky Stenhouse Jr. using a design inspired by Waltrip's Western Auto #17 from the 1990s.

FS1 Television
Booth announcers	Pit reporters
Lap-by-lap: Mike Joy; Color-commentator: Jeff Gordon; Color commentator: Darrell Waltrip	Jamie Little; Regan Smith; Matt Yocum

=== Radio ===
Radio coverage of the race was broadcast by the Performance Racing Network. PRN's broadcast of the race was simulcasted on Sirius XM NASCAR Radio. Doug Rice and Mark Garrow announced the race in the booth while the field was racing on the pit straightaway. Pat Patterson called the race from a stand outside of turn 2 when the field was racing up turns 2, 3 and 3a. Brad Gillie called the race from a stand outside of turn 7a when the field was racing through turns 4a and 7a. Doug Turnbull called the race when the field raced thru turns 8 and 9. Rob Albright called the race from a billboard outside turn 11 when the field was racing through turns 10 and 11. Heather Debeaux, Brett McMillan, Wendy Venturini and Jim Noble reported from pit lane during the race.

PRN
Booth announcers	Turn announcers	Pit reporters
Lead announcer: Doug Rice; Announcer: Mark Garrow	Turns 2, 3 & 3a: Pat Patterson; Turns 4a & 7a: Brad Gillie; Turns 8 & 9: Doug Turnbull; Turns 10 & 11: Rob Albright	Heather DeBeaux; Brett McMillan; Wendy Venturini; Jim Noble

== Standings after the race ==
Drivers' Championship standings

	Pos	Driver	Points
	1	Joey Logano	643
	2	Kyle Busch	642 (–1)
1	3	Kevin Harvick	573 (–70)
1	4	Brad Keselowski	569 (–74)
1	5	Martin Truex Jr.	543 (–100)
1	6	Denny Hamlin	542 (–101)
2	7	Chase Elliott	535 (–108)
	8	Kurt Busch	509 (–134)
	9	Ryan Blaney	468 (–175)
	10	Alex Bowman	460 (–183)
	11	Aric Almirola	460 (–183)
	12	Clint Bowyer	430 (–213)
	13	Daniel Suárez	421 (–222)
	14	William Byron	419 (–224)
	15	Kyle Larson	408 (–235)
1	16	Ryan Newman	391 (–252)
Official driver's standings

Manufacturers' Championship standings

Pos	Manufacturer	Points
1	Toyota	598
2	Ford	576 (–22)
3	Chevrolet	530 (–68)

- Note: Only the first 16 positions are included for the driver standings.
- . – Driver has clinched a position in the Monster Energy NASCAR Cup Series playoffs.

Previous race: 2019 FireKeepers Casino 400	Monster Energy NASCAR Cup Series; 2019 season	Next race: 2019 Camping World 400
