= 2024 Grant Park 165 =

NASCAR Cup Series race

Race details
- Race 20 of 36 in the 2024 NASCAR Cup Series
- Date: July 7, 2024
- Location: Chicago Street Course in Chicago, Illinois
- Course: Temporary street course
- Course length: 2.2 miles (3.5 km)
- Distance: 58 laps, 127.6 mi (205.352 km)
- Scheduled distance: 75 laps, 165 mi (265.542 km)
- Average speed: 54.921 miles per hour (88.387 km/h)

Pole position
Driver	Kyle Larson	Hendrick Motorsports
- Time: 1:27.836

Most laps led
Driver	Ty Gibbs	Joe Gibbs Racing
- Laps: 17

Winner
No. 48	Alex Bowman	Hendrick Motorsports

Television in the United States
- Network: NBC
- Announcers: Rick Allen, Steve Letarte (booth), Mike Bagley (Turns 1–2 and 6–10), Dillon Welch (Turns 3–5) and Jeff Burton (Turn 11)
- Nielsen ratings: 2.1 (3.79 million)

Radio in the United States
- Radio: MRN
- Booth announcers: Alex Hayden and Jeff Striegle
- Turn announcers: Dave Moody (Turns 1 and 6), Kurt Becker (Turns 2–5) and Dan Hubbard (Turns 7–11)

The 2024 Grant Park 165 was a NASCAR Cup Series race held on July 7, 2024, at the Chicago Street Course in Chicago, Illinois. Originally scheduled for 75 laps, the race was shortened to 58 laps due to darkness, on the 2.2-mile (3.5 km) street course, it was the 20th race of the 2024 NASCAR Cup Series season. Alex Bowman won the race, his 8th career win, breaking an 80 race win drought. Tyler Reddick finished 2nd, and Ty Gibbs finished 3rd. Joey Hand and Michael McDowell rounded out the top five, and Ricky Stenhouse Jr., Todd Gilliland, William Byron, Kyle Busch, and Ryan Blaney rounded out the top ten.

== Report ==
=== Background ===
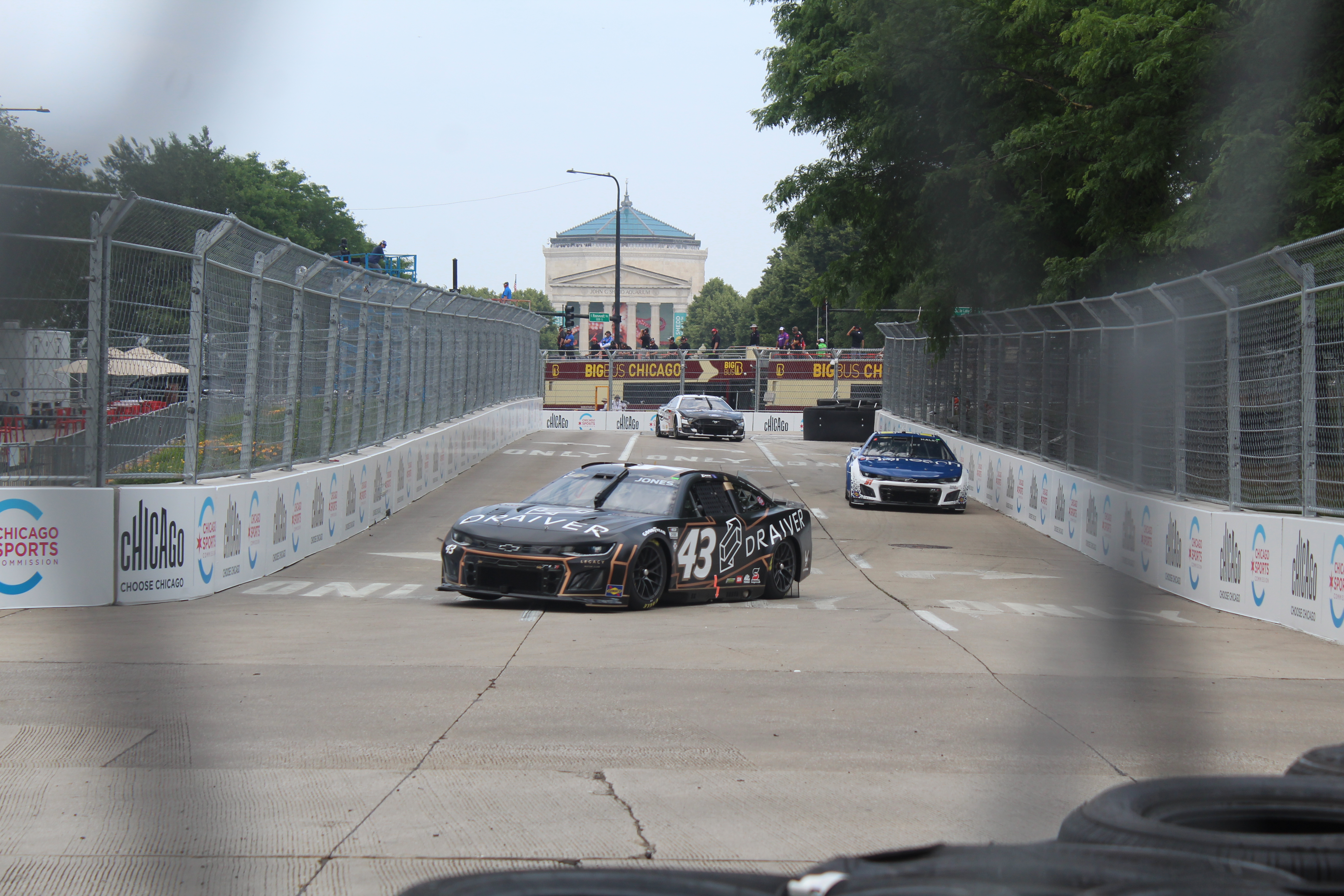
The Chicago Street Course, where the race was held.

The Chicago Street Course is a 2.2 mi (3.5 km) street circuit located in the city of Chicago, Illinois, United States. It hosts the NASCAR Cup Series and NASCAR Xfinity Series. The track was initially a conceptual track on iRacing made for the eNASCAR iRacing Pro Invitational Series in 2021.

The track for the race ended up being the exact same layout as the version used in 2021 for the eNASCAR iRacing Pro Invitational Series. The start/finish line is located on South Columbus Drive in front of Buckingham Fountain in Grant Park. The cars will go south and then turn left onto East Balbo Drive and then right onto South Lake Shore Drive (also part of U.S. Route 41), which is alongside Lake Michigan. The cars will then turn right onto East Roosevelt Road and then make another right, which gets them back onto South Columbus Drive where they are going north. They will then reach the intersection of South Columbus Drive and East Balbo Drive again and will make a left turn. When they are back on East Balbo Drive, they will cross a bridge over the Metra Electric District tracks. Next, the cars will turn right onto South Michigan Avenue and go north, go onto East Congress Plaza Drive and back onto South Michigan Ave. Lastly, they will make a right turn onto East Jackson Drive, go back across the Metra Electric tracks, and right back onto South Columbus Drive to the start/finish line.

On October 20, 2023, NASCAR announced that the 2024 Cup Series Chicago Street Race would be shortened from 220 miles (354.056 km) and 100 laps to 165 miles (265.542) and 75 laps.

==== Entry list ====
- (R) denotes rookie driver.
- (i) denotes driver who is ineligible for series driver points.

No.	Driver	Team	Manufacturer
1	Ross Chastain	Trackhouse Racing	Chevrolet
2	Austin Cindric	Team Penske	Ford
3	Austin Dillon	Richard Childress Racing	Chevrolet
4	Josh Berry (R)	Stewart-Haas Racing	Ford
5	Kyle Larson	Hendrick Motorsports	Chevrolet
6	Brad Keselowski	RFK Racing	Ford
7	Corey LaJoie	Spire Motorsports	Chevrolet
8	Kyle Busch	Richard Childress Racing	Chevrolet
9	Chase Elliott	Hendrick Motorsports	Chevrolet
10	Noah Gragson	Stewart-Haas Racing	Ford
11	Denny Hamlin	Joe Gibbs Racing	Toyota
12	Ryan Blaney	Team Penske	Ford
13	A. J. Allmendinger (i)	Kaulig Racing	Chevrolet
14	Chase Briscoe	Stewart-Haas Racing	Ford
15	Kaz Grala (R)	Rick Ware Racing	Ford
16	Shane van Gisbergen (i)	Kaulig Racing	Chevrolet
17	Chris Buescher	RFK Racing	Ford
19	Martin Truex Jr.	Joe Gibbs Racing	Toyota
20	Christopher Bell	Joe Gibbs Racing	Toyota
21	Harrison Burton	Wood Brothers Racing	Ford
22	Joey Logano	Team Penske	Ford
23	Bubba Wallace	23XI Racing	Toyota
24	William Byron	Hendrick Motorsports	Chevrolet
31	Daniel Hemric	Kaulig Racing	Chevrolet
33	Austin Hill (i)	Richard Childress Racing	Chevrolet
34	Michael McDowell	Front Row Motorsports	Ford
38	Todd Gilliland	Front Row Motorsports	Ford
41	Ryan Preece	Stewart-Haas Racing	Ford
42	John Hunter Nemechek	Legacy Motor Club	Toyota
43	Erik Jones	Legacy Motor Club	Toyota
45	Tyler Reddick	23XI Racing	Toyota
47	Ricky Stenhouse Jr.	JTG Daugherty Racing	Chevrolet
48	Alex Bowman	Hendrick Motorsports	Chevrolet
51	Justin Haley	Rick Ware Racing	Ford
54	Ty Gibbs	Joe Gibbs Racing	Toyota
60	Joey Hand	RFK Racing	Ford
66	Josh Bilicki (i)	Power Source	Ford
71	Zane Smith (R)	Spire Motorsports	Chevrolet
77	Carson Hocevar (R)	Spire Motorsports	Chevrolet
99	Daniel Suárez	Trackhouse Racing	Chevrolet
Official entry list

== Practice ==
Kyle Larson was the fastest in the practice session with a time of 1:28.443 seconds and a speed of 89.549 mph (144.115 km/h).

=== Practice results ===
Pos	No.	Driver	Team	Manufacturer	Time	Speed
1	5	Kyle Larson	Hendrick Motorsports	Chevrolet	1:28.443	89.549
2	16	Shane van Gisbergen (i)	Kaulig Racing	Chevrolet	1:28.556	89.435
3	54	Ty Gibbs	Joe Gibbs Racing	Toyota	1:28.586	89.405
Official practice results

== Qualifying ==
Kyle Larson scored the pole for the race with a time of 1:27.836 and a speed of 90.168 mph (145.111 km/h).

=== Qualifying results ===
Pos	No.	Driver	Team	Manufacturer	R1	R2
1	5	Kyle Larson	Hendrick Motorsports	Chevrolet	1:27.518	1:27.836
2	54	Ty Gibbs	Joe Gibbs Racing	Toyota	1:27.932	1:27.846
3	34	Michael McDowell	Front Row Motorsports	Ford	1:27.999	1:27.862
4	45	Tyler Reddick	23XI Racing	Toyota	1:28.074	1:28.075
5	16	Shane van Gisbergen (i)	Kaulig Racing	Chevrolet	1:27.864	1:28.183
6	23	Bubba Wallace	23XI Racing	Toyota	1:28.195	1:28.320
7	20	Christopher Bell	Joe Gibbs Racing	Toyota	1:27.964	1:28.366
8	48	Alex Bowman	Hendrick Motorsports	Chevrolet	1:28.476	1:28.759
9	99	Daniel Suárez	Trackhouse Racing	Chevrolet	1:28.159	1:28.874
10	6	Brad Keselowski	RFK Racing	Ford	1:27.927	1:44.877
11	11	Denny Hamlin	Joe Gibbs Racing	Toyota	1:28.550	—
12	42	John Hunter Nemechek	Legacy Motor Club	Toyota	1:28.365	—
13	77	Carson Hocevar (R)	Spire Motorsports	Chevrolet	1:28.600	—
14	1	Ross Chastain	Trackhouse Racing	Chevrolet	1:28.402	—
15	3	Austin Dillon	Richard Childress Racing	Chevrolet	1:28.955	—
16	17	Chris Buescher	RFK Racing	Ford	1:28.478	—
17	12	Ryan Blaney	Team Penske	Ford	1:29.010	—
18	9	Chase Elliott	Hendrick Motorsports	Chevrolet	1:28.481	—
19	8	Kyle Busch	Richard Childress Racing	Chevrolet	1:29.071	—
20	7	Corey LaJoie	Spire Motorsports	Chevrolet	1:28.531	—
21	2	Austin Cindric	Team Penske	Ford	1:29.073	—
22	14	Chase Briscoe	Stewart-Haas Racing	Ford	1:28.580	—
23	51	Justin Haley	Rick Ware Racing	Ford	1:29.197	—
24	19	Martin Truex Jr.	Joe Gibbs Racing	Toyota	1:28.629	—
25	43	Erik Jones	Legacy Motor Club	Toyota	1:29.228	—
26	38	Todd Gilliland	Front Row Motorsports	Ford	1:28.815	—
27	24	William Byron	Hendrick Motorsports	Chevrolet	1:29.230	—
28	10	Noah Gragson	Stewart-Haas Racing	Ford	1:28.920	—
29	41	Ryan Preece	Stewart-Haas Racing	Ford	1:29.264	—
30	71	Zane Smith (R)	Spire Motorsports	Chevrolet	1:28.963	—
31	21	Harrison Burton	Wood Brothers Racing	Ford	1:29.387	—
32	22	Joey Logano	Team Penske	Ford	1:29.159	—
33	47	Ricky Stenhouse Jr.	JTG Daugherty Racing	Chevrolet	1:29.593	—
34	33	Austin Hill (i)	Richard Childress Racing	Chevrolet	1:29.167	—
35	31	Daniel Hemric	Kaulig Racing	Chevrolet	1:29.608	—
36	4	Josh Berry (R)	Stewart-Haas Racing	Ford	1:29.384	—
37	13	A. J. Allmendinger (i)	Kaulig Racing	Chevrolet	1:30.236	—
38	60	Joey Hand	RFK Racing	Ford	1:29.496	—
39	66	Josh Bilicki (i)	Power Source	Ford	0.000	—
40	15	Kaz Grala (R)	Rick Ware Racing	Ford	1:29.514	—
Official qualifying results

== Race ==
As it rained after the five-minute signal before engines started, NASCAR delayed the start as is required since it was sunny during practice and qualifying. As a result, on Lap 15, at 4:58 p.m. CDT, NASCAR sent a bulletin to teams announcing the time-certain finish rule was set for 8:20 p.m. CDT, meaning 75 laps or two laps after the set time. This rule is similar to most motorsport series that have time-certain finishes. Under the new curfew rule, there would be no overtime, and once the leader crosses the finish line upon the expiration of time, two laps remaining .

On Lap 17, Corey LaJoie impacts the wall at East Jackson Boulevard (Turn 11). Pit lane remains closed because of rain as the stage ends on Lap 20, the first of two points-paying laps for the top ten. Shane van Gisbergen wins Stage One, and pits open on Lap 21. All cars not on rain tires change to wets. On the ensuing restart on Lap 25, Chase Briscoe makes contact with van Gisbergen at Turn 6, causing the defending race winner's car to slam the right-side wall, ending his day and causing a caution. With visibility and standing water an issue (common with street circuits), NASCAR red flags the race for 1 hour, 15 minutes. Drivers are sent to the cars, but another rain shower in Turn 11 creates an issue with more standing water, leading to another 28 minute delay to remove the standing water, for a total of 1 hour, 43 minutes. Teams are told all restarts will be single-file, with the restart on Lap 30, with one hour remaining.

On the Lap 30 restart, Christopher Bell passes Ty Gibbs on the run from Columbus Drive to East Balbo. Shortly after, Denny Hamlin and Ricky Stenhouse, Jr. collide in that turn. Both recover. On Lap 33, Kyle Larson is trying to overtake Ty Gibbs for second when he locks up his tires and buries his Saudi Aramco-sponsored Chevrolet into the tire barriers, causing a caution. Bell and Gibbs are leading the field on the Lap 38 restart, with eight laps remaining in the stage and about 40 minutes remaining in the race.

On Lap 42, with a dry line potentially forming with pit closure coming for the end of the second stage, a group of cars led by Austin Dillon, Austin Hill, Chase Elliott, Kyle Busch, Michael McDowell, Ryan Blaney, and William Byron pitted to switch to slicks. This causes leaders Christopher Bell, Ty Gibbs, Todd Gilliland, John Hunter Nemechek, and Tyler Reddick among the leaders (primarily Toyotas) to pit for slicks on Lap 43. Once the leader starts Lap 44, pit lane is closed with two laps remaining in Stage 2, with 30 minutes remaining in the race.

New leaders Joey Hand and Alex Bowman stay out on rain tires, and finish first and second in Stage 2, respectively. The leaders stay on rain tires for the Lap 49 restart, hoping the delta for rain and slick tire performance is sufficient. Bell, who led before pit stops, restarts 13th on Lap 49, with approximately fifteen minutes remaining. On Lap 51, with 14 minutes remaining in the race, Bowman passes Hand on Lake Shore Drive where it joins East Roosevelt Road (Turn 4), and with 12 minutes remaining, Josh Berry crashes into the tire barriers on Lake Shore Drive to bring out the safety car. The delta between rain and slick tires has changed in favor of the slicks, and the Bell team asks that double-file restarts be used, which NASCAR declines. The restart occurs on Lap 54, with 4:30 remaining, or about four laps left. The Toyotas on slicks were faster, but with a minute and a half remaining, Ricky Stenhouse, Jr. collides with Martin Truex, Jr. (both on rain tires), making contact with Christopher Bell on Balbo Drive.

Working Lap 55, time expires at 8:20 p.m., and leader Alex Bowman crosses the finish line second later to start Lap 56, the penultimate lap. Tyler Reddick is now third, best among the cars with slicks. Reddick and Ty Gibbs easily pass Joey Hand, who is still on rain tires, at Turn 6, with the gap between Reddick and Bowman fast closing. At 8:21 p.m., Bowman takes the signal for the final lap, with Reddick fast closing. Only the optimum line is dry.

Reddick puts right-side tires on wet sections of at Roosevelt Road (Turn 4), making contact with the inside barrier, and then left side tires on wet sections in Turn 5 on the exit of Columbus Drive, making contact with the outside barriers, ending his efforts to catch Bowman.

Bowman successfully stays on the rain tires and ended an 80-race winless streak (last win in March 2022 at Las Vegas) in the process.

=== Race results ===
==== Stage results ====
Stage One Laps: 20

Pos	No	Driver	Team	Manufacturer	Points
1	16	Shane van Gisbergen (i)	Kaulig Racing	Chevrolet	0
2	20	Christopher Bell	Joe Gibbs Racing	Toyota	9
3	54	Ty Gibbs	Joe Gibbs Racing	Toyota	8
4	14	Chase Briscoe	Stewart-Haas Racing	Ford	7
5	5	Kyle Larson	Hendrick Motorsports	Chevrolet	6
6	48	Alex Bowman	Hendrick Motorsports	Chevrolet	5
7	23	Bubba Wallace	23XI Racing	Toyota	4
8	38	Todd Gilliland	Front Row Motorsports	Ford	3
9	45	Tyler Reddick	23XI Racing	Toyota	2
10	99	Daniel Suárez	Trackhouse Racing	Chevrolet	1
Official stage one results

Stage Two Laps: 25

Pos	No	Driver	Team	Manufacturer	Points
1	60	Joey Hand	RFK Racing	Ford	10
2	48	Alex Bowman	Hendrick Motorsports	Chevrolet	9
3	6	Brad Keselowski	RFK Racing	Ford	8
4	77	Carson Hocevar (R)	Spire Motorsports	Chevrolet	7
5	19	Martin Truex Jr.	Joe Gibbs Racing	Toyota	6
6	10	Noah Gragson	Stewart-Haas Racing	Ford	5
7	31	Daniel Hemric	Kaulig Racing	Chevrolet	4
8	47	Ricky Stenhouse Jr.	JTG Daugherty Racing	Chevrolet	3
9	21	Harrison Burton	Wood Brothers Racing	Ford	2
10	11	Denny Hamlin	Joe Gibbs Racing	Toyota	1
Official stage two results

=== Final Stage results ===
Stage Three Laps: 30

Pos	Grid	No	Driver	Team	Manufacturer	Laps	Points
1	8	48	Alex Bowman	Hendrick Motorsports	Chevrolet	58	54
2	4	45	Tyler Reddick	23XI Racing	Toyota	58	37
3	2	54	Ty Gibbs	Joe Gibbs Racing	Toyota	58	42
4	38	60	Joey Hand	RFK Racing	Ford	58	43
5	3	34	Michael McDowell	Front Row Motorsports	Ford	58	32
6	33	47	Ricky Stenhouse Jr.	JTG Daugherty Racing	Chevrolet	58	34
7	26	38	Todd Gilliland	Front Row Motorsports	Ford	58	33
8	27	24	William Byron	Hendrick Motorsports	Chevrolet	58	29
9	19	8	Kyle Busch	Richard Childress Racing	Chevrolet	58	28
10	17	12	Ryan Blaney	Team Penske	Ford	58	27
11	9	99	Daniel Suárez	Trackhouse Racing	Chevrolet	58	27
12	35	31	Daniel Hemric	Kaulig Racing	Chevrolet	58	29
13	6	23	Bubba Wallace	23XI Racing	Toyota	58	28
14	28	10	Noah Gragson	Stewart-Haas Racing	Ford	58	28
15	21	2	Austin Cindric	Team Penske	Ford	58	22
16	23	51	Justin Haley	Rick Ware Racing	Ford	58	21
17	30	71	Zane Smith (R)	Spire Motorsports	Chevrolet	58	20
18	10	6	Brad Keselowski	RFK Racing	Ford	58	27
19	15	3	Austin Dillon	Richard Childress Racing	Chevrolet	58	18
20	16	17	Chris Buescher	RFK Racing	Ford	58	17
21	18	9	Chase Elliott	Hendrick Motorsports	Chevrolet	58	16
22	14	1	Ross Chastain	Trackhouse Racing	Chevrolet	58	15
23	32	22	Joey Logano	Team Penske	Ford	58	14
24	13	77	Carson Hocevar (R)	Spire Motorsports	Chevrolet	58	20
25	31	21	Harrison Burton	Wood Brothers Racing	Ford	58	14
26	40	15	Kaz Grala (R)	Rick Ware Racing	Ford	58	11
27	20	7	Corey LaJoie	Spire Motorsports	Chevrolet	58	10
28	39	66	Josh Bilicki (i)	Power Source	Ford	58	0
29	25	43	Erik Jones	Legacy Motor Club	Toyota	58	8
30	11	11	Denny Hamlin	Joe Gibbs Racing	Toyota	58	8
31	34	33	Austin Hill (i)	Richard Childress Racing	Chevrolet	58	0
32	22	14	Chase Briscoe	Stewart-Haas Racing	Ford	58	12
33	24	19	Martin Truex Jr.	Joe Gibbs Racing	Toyota	58	10
34	29	41	Ryan Preece	Stewart-Haas Racing	Ford	58	3
35	12	42	John Hunter Nemechek	Legacy Motor Club	Toyota	57	2
36	36	4	Josh Berry (R)	Stewart-Haas Racing	Ford	57	1
37	7	20	Christopher Bell	Joe Gibbs Racing	Toyota	55	10
38	37	13	A. J. Allmendinger (i)	Kaulig Racing	Chevrolet	48	0
39	1	5	Kyle Larson	Hendrick Motorsports	Chevrolet	33	7
40	5	16	Shane van Gisbergen (i)	Kaulig Racing	Chevrolet	24	0
Official race results

=== Race statistics ===
- Lead changes: 9 among 6 different drivers
- Cautions/Laps: 5 for 19 laps
- Red flags: 1 for 1 hour, 43 minutes and 1 second
- Time of race: 2 hours, 19 minutes, and 24 seconds
- Average speed: 54.921 miles per hour (88.387 km/h)

== Media ==
=== Television ===
NBC Sports covered the race on the television side, as part of a radio style broadcast for the race. Rick Allen and Steve Letarte called the race from the broadcast booth. MRN broadcaster Mike Bagley called the race from Turns 1–2 and 6–10 on South Columbus Drive and East Balbo Drive, Dillon Welch had the call from Turn 4 on DuSable Lake Shore Drive and Roosevelt Road, and Jeff Burton had the call on Turn 11 on South Michigan Avenue and East Jackson Drive. Dave Burns, Kim Coon, Parker Kligerman and Marty Snider handled the pit road duties from pit lane.

NBC
Booth announcers	Turn announcers	Pit reporters
Lap-by-lap: Rick Allen; Color-commentator: Steve Letarte	Turns 1–2 & 6–10: Mike Bagley; Turns 3–5: Dillon Welch; Turn 11: Jeff Burton	Dave Burns; Kim Coon; Parker Kligerman; Marty Snider

=== Radio ===
Radio coverage of the race was broadcast by Motor Racing Network (MRN) and was also simulcast on Sirius XM NASCAR Radio.

MRN
Booth announcers	Turn announcers	Pit reporters
Lead announcer: Alex Hayden; Announcer: Jeff Striegle	Turns 1 & 6: Dave Moody; Turns 2–5: Kurt Becker; Turns 7–11: Dan Hubbard	Steve Post; Chris Wilner

== Standings after the race ==
Drivers' Championship standings

	Pos	Driver	Points
	1	Kyle Larson	671
	2	Chase Elliott	660 (–11)
1	3	Tyler Reddick	648 (–23)
1	4	Denny Hamlin	629 (–42)
	5	Martin Truex Jr.	601 (–70)
1	6	William Byron	599 (–72)
1	7	Ryan Blaney	587 (–84)
2	8	Christopher Bell	586 (–85)
1	9	Ty Gibbs	560 (–111)
1	10	Brad Keselowski	558 (–113)
2	11	Alex Bowman	553 (–118)
1	12	Ross Chastain	529 (–142)
1	13	Chris Buescher	521 (–150)
	14	Joey Logano	484 (–187)
	15	Bubba Wallace	476 (–195)
	16	Chase Briscoe	433 (–238)
Official driver's standings

Manufacturers' Championship standings

Pos	Manufacturer	Points
1	Chevrolet	725
2	Toyota	716 (–9)
3	Ford	696 (–29)

- Note: Only the first 16 positions are included for the driver standings.
- . – Driver has clinched a position in the NASCAR Cup Series playoffs.

Previous race: 2024 Ally 400	NASCAR Cup Series; 2024 season	Next race: 2024 The Great American Getaway 400
