= 2014 DRIVE4COPD 300 =

First race of the 2014 NASCAR Nationwide Series

Race details
- Race 1 of 33 of the 2014 NASCAR Nationwide Series
- Date: February 22, 2014
- Official name: 33rd Annual DRIVE4COPD 300
- Location: Daytona Beach, Florida, Daytona International Speedway
- Course: Permanent racing facility
- Course length: 2.5 miles (4.0 km)
- Distance: 121 laps, 302.5 mi (486.826 km)
- Scheduled distance: 120 laps, 300 mi (480 km)
- Average speed: 148.204 miles per hour (238.511 km/h)

Pole position
Driver	Dylan Kwasniewski	Turner Scott Motorsports
- Time: 46.856

Most laps led
Driver	Kyle Busch	Joe Gibbs Racing
- Laps: 44

Winner
No. 7	Regan Smith	JR Motorsports

Television in the United States
- Network: ESPN
- Announcers: Allen Bestwick, Dale Jarrett, Andy Petree

Radio in the United States
- Radio: Motor Racing Network

The 2014 DRIVE4COPD 300 was the first stock car race of the 2014 NASCAR Nationwide Series season, and the 33rd iteration of the event. The race was held on Saturday, February 22, 2014, in Daytona Beach, Florida at Daytona International Speedway, a 2.5 miles (4.0 km) permanent asphalt quad-oval superspeedway. The race was extended from 120 laps to 121 laps, due to a NASCAR overtime finish. At race's end, Regan Smith, driving for JR Motorsports, would hold off Brad Keselowski in a photo finish for his 4th career NASCAR Nationwide Series win. Smith would beat Keselowski by 0.013 second. To fill out the podium, Trevor Bayne of Roush Fenway Racing would finish third, respectively.

== Background ==
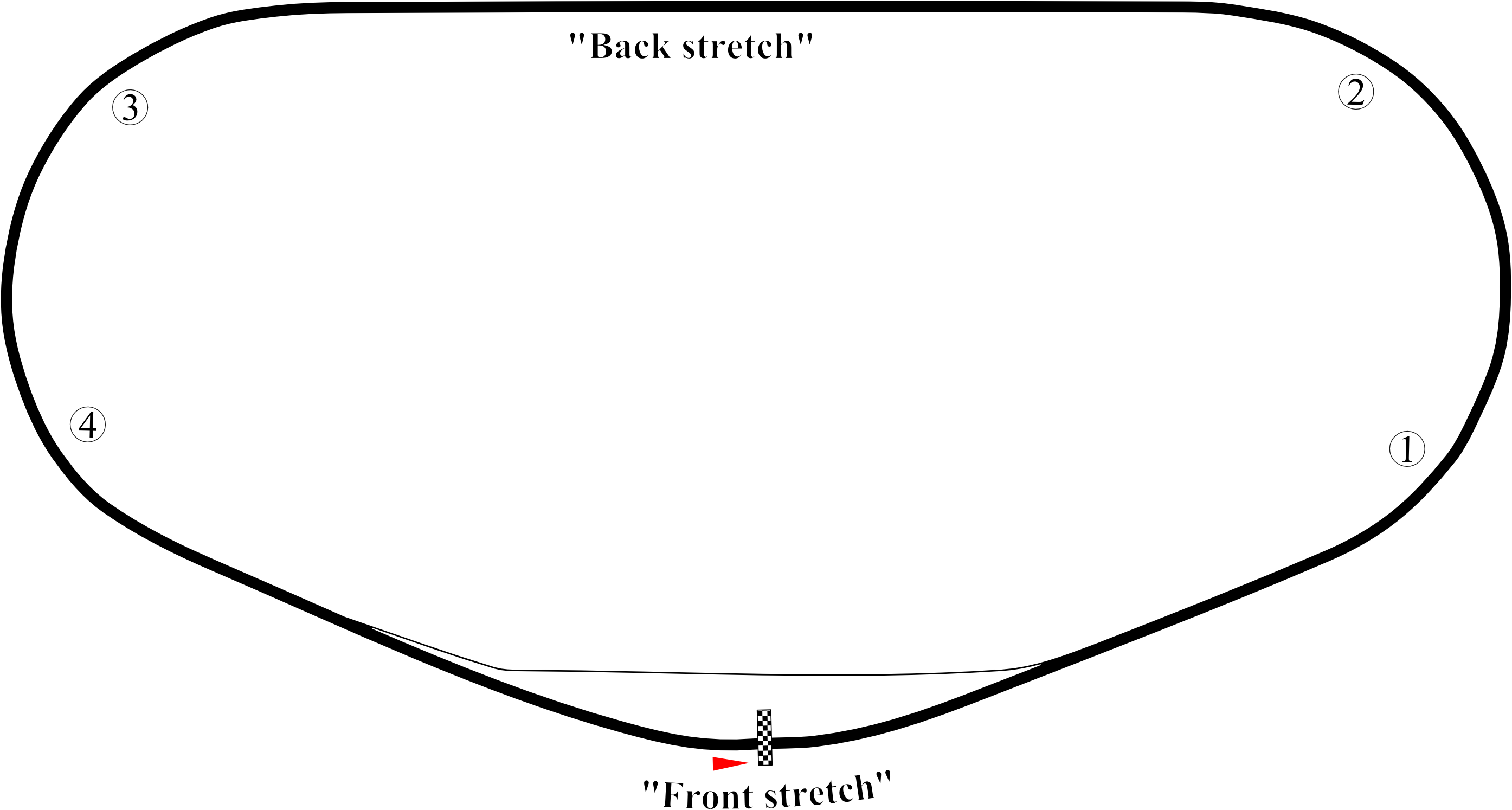
The layout of Daytona International Speedway, the venue where the race was held.

The race was held at Daytona International Speedway, which is a race track in Daytona Beach, Florida, United States. Since opening in 1959, it has been the home of the Daytona 500, the most prestigious race in NASCAR as well as its season opening event. In addition to NASCAR, the track also hosts races of ARCA, AMA Superbike, IMSA, SCCA, and Motocross. The track features multiple layouts including the primary 2.500 mi (4.023 km) high-speed tri-oval, a 3.560 mi (5.729 km) sports car course, a 2.950 mi (4.748 km) motorcycle course, and a 1,320 ft (402.3 m) karting and motorcycle flat-track. The track's 180-acre (72.8 ha) infield includes the 29-acre (11.7 ha) Lake Lloyd, which has hosted powerboat racing. The speedway is operated by NASCAR pursuant to a lease with the City of Daytona Beach on the property that runs until 2054.

=== Entry list ===
- (R) denotes rookie driver.
- (i) denotes driver who is ineligible for series driver points.

#	Driver	Team	Make	Sponsor
00	Jason White	SR² Motorsports	Toyota	Police Sunglasses, Friday Night Tykes
01	Landon Cassill	JD Motorsports	Chevrolet	G&K Services
2	Brian Scott	Richard Childress Racing	Chevrolet	Shore Lodge
3	Ty Dillon (R)	Richard Childress Racing	Chevrolet	Bass Pro Shops, Tracker Boats
4	Jeffrey Earnhardt	JD Motorsports	Chevrolet	Flex Steel
6	Trevor Bayne	Roush Fenway Racing	Ford	AdvoCare
7	Regan Smith	JR Motorsports	Chevrolet	Ragú
9	Chase Elliott (R)	JR Motorsports	Chevrolet	NAPA Auto Parts
10	David Starr	TriStar Motorsports	Toyota	BYF.org
11	Elliott Sadler	Joe Gibbs Racing	Toyota	OneMain Financial
13	Carl Long	MBM Motorsports	Toyota	OCR Gaz Bar
14	Eric McClure	TriStar Motorsports	Toyota	Hefty Ultimate, Reynolds Wrap
15	Carlos Contreras	Rick Ware Racing	Ford	RaceTrac
16	Ryan Reed (R)	Roush Fenway Racing	Ford	Lilly Diabetes
17	Tanner Berryhill (R)	Vision Racing	Dodge	BWP Bats
19	Mike Bliss	TriStar Motorsports	Toyota	Tweaker Energy Shot
20	Matt Kenseth (i)	Joe Gibbs Racing	Toyota	Reser's Main Street Bistro
22	Brad Keselowski (i)	Team Penske	Ford	Discount Tire
23	Robert Richardson Jr.	R3 Motorsports	Chevrolet	Cornboard
24	Harrison Rhodes	SR² Motorsports	Toyota	Hoodz-Ductz
28	Mike Wallace	JGL Racing	Dodge	Unker's
29	Scott Lagasse Jr.	RAB Racing	Toyota	Alert Today Florida
30	Danica Patrick (i)	Turner Scott Motorsports	Chevrolet	Florida Lottery
31	Dylan Kwasniewski (R)	Turner Scott Motorsports	Chevrolet	Rockstar, Fraternal Order of Eagles
37	Matt DiBenedetto	Vision Racing	Dodge	National Cash Lenders
39	Ryan Sieg (R) (i)	RSS Racing	Chevrolet	Pull-A-Part
40	Josh Wise (i)	The Motorsports Group	Chevrolet	Curtis Key Plumbing
42	Kyle Larson (i)	Turner Scott Motorsports	Chevrolet	Axe
43	Dakoda Armstrong (R)	Richard Petty Motorsports	Ford	WinField United
44	Blake Koch	TriStar Motorsports	Toyota	Son of God
51	Jeremy Clements	Jeremy Clements Racing	Chevrolet	Jeremy Clements Racing
52	Joey Gase	Jimmy Means Racing	Chevrolet	TransLife
54	Kyle Busch (i)	Joe Gibbs Racing	Toyota	Monster Energy
55	Jamie Dick	Viva Motorsports	Chevrolet	Viva Auto Group
60	Chris Buescher (R)	Roush Fenway Racing	Ford	Ford EcoBoost
62	Brendan Gaughan	Richard Childress Racing	Chevrolet	South Point Hotel, Casino & Spa
67	Clay Greenfield (i)	Martins Motorsports	Dodge	Martins Motorsports
70	Derrike Cope	Derrike Cope Racing	Chevrolet	Charliesoap.com
74	Mike Harmon	Mike Harmon Racing	Dodge	Genesis Auto Body
76	Willie Allen (i)	Martins Motorsports	Dodge	Diamond Gusset Jeans, Alpha Pro Solutions
80	Johnny Sauter (i)	Hattori Racing Enterprises	Toyota	Goodyear
84	Chad Boat (R)	Billy Boat Motorsports	Chevrolet	CorvetteParts.net
85	Bobby Gerhart	Bobby Gerhart Racing	Chevrolet	Lucas Oil
87	Joe Nemechek (i)	NEMCO-Jay Robinson Racing	Toyota	D. A. B. Constructors, pelletgrillusa.com
88	Dale Earnhardt Jr. (i)	JR Motorsports	Chevrolet	TaxSlayer
91	Jeff Green	TriStar Motorsports	Toyota	Supportmilitary.org
93	Matt Carter	JGL Racing	Dodge	Guardian Digital Furnaces
98	David Ragan (i)	Biagi-DenBeste Racing	Ford	Carroll Shelby Engine Company
99	James Buescher	RAB Racing	Toyota	Rheem
Official entry list

== Practice ==
=== First practice ===
The first practice session was held on Thursday, February 20, at 12:00 PM EST, and would last for 85 minutes. Elliott Sadler of Joe Gibbs Racing would set the fastest time in the session, with a lap of 47.876 and an average speed of 187.986 miles per hour (302.534 km/h).

Pos.	#	Driver	Team	Make	Time	Speed
1	11	Elliott Sadler	Joe Gibbs Racing	Toyota	47.876	187.986
2	20	Matt Kenseth (i)	Joe Gibbs Racing	Toyota	47.904	187.876
3	54	Kyle Busch (i)	Joe Gibbs Racing	Toyota	47.937	187.746
Full first practice results

=== Second and final practice ===
The third and final practice session, sometimes referred to as Happy Hour, was held on Thursday, February 20, at 3:00 PM EST, and would last for 85 minutes. Bobby Gerhart of Bobby Gerhart Racing would set the fastest time in the session, with a lap of 47.533 and an average speed of 189.342 miles per hour (304.716 km/h).

Pos.	#	Driver	Team	Make	Time	Speed
1	85	Bobby Gerhart	Bobby Gerhart Racing	Chevrolet	47.533	189.342
2	29	Scott Lagasse Jr.	RAB Racing	Toyota	47.559	189.239
3	16	Ryan Reed (R)	Roush Fenway Racing	Ford	47.710	188.640
Full Happy Hour practice results

== Qualifying ==
Qualifying was held on Friday, February 21, at 1:10 PM EST. Since Daytona International Speedway is at least 1.25 miles (2.01 km), the qualifying system was a multi-car system that included three rounds. The first round was 25 minutes, where every driver would be able to set a lap within the 25 minutes. Then, the second round would consist of the fastest 24 cars in Round 1, and drivers would have 10 minutes to set a lap. Round 3 consisted of the fastest 12 drivers from Round 2, and the drivers would have 5 minutes to set a time. Whoever was fastest in Round 3 would win the pole.

Qualifying was cancelled after the first round, due to inclement weather. Dylan Kwasniewski of Turner Scott Motorsports would win the pole after setting a fast enough time in the round, with a time of 46.856 and an average speed of 192.078 mph (309.120 km/h).

Nine drivers would fail to qualify: David Ragan, Tanner Berryhill, Chris Buescher, Willie Allen, Matt Carter, Matt DiBenedetto, Carl Long, Carlos Contreras, and Clay Greenfield.

=== Full qualifying results ===
Pos.	#	Driver	Team	Make	Time	Speed
1	31	Dylan Kwasniewski (R)	Turner Scott Motorsports	Chevrolet	46.856	192.078
2	42	Kyle Larson (i)	Turner Scott Motorsports	Chevrolet	46.857	192.074
3	30	Danica Patrick (i)	Turner Scott Motorsports	Chevrolet	46.867	192.033
4	54	Kyle Busch (i)	Joe Gibbs Racing	Toyota	46.968	191.620
5	11	Elliott Sadler	Joe Gibbs Racing	Toyota	46.968	191.620
6	20	Matt Kenseth (i)	Joe Gibbs Racing	Toyota	46.982	191.563
7	55	Jamie Dick	Viva Motorsports	Chevrolet	47.173	190.787
8	91	Jeff Green	TriStar Motorsports	Toyota	47.174	190.783
9	80	Johnny Sauter (i)	Hattori Racing Enterprises	Toyota	47.185	190.739
10	10	David Starr	TriStar Motorsports	Toyota	47.189	190.722
11	44	Blake Koch	TriStar Motorsports	Toyota	47.201	190.674
12	19	Mike Bliss	TriStar Motorsports	Toyota	47.208	190.646
13	14	Eric McClure	TriStar Motorsports	Toyota	47.213	190.625
14	99	James Buescher	RAB Racing	Toyota	47.274	190.379
15	24	Harrison Rhodes	SR² Motorsports	Toyota	47.383	189.942
16	88	Dale Earnhardt Jr. (i)	JR Motorsports	Chevrolet	47.391	189.909
17	22	Brad Keselowski (i)	Team Penske	Ford	47.407	189.845
18	85	Bobby Gerhart	Bobby Gerhart Racing	Chevrolet	47.414	189.817
19	7	Regan Smith	JR Motorsports	Chevrolet	47.431	189.749
20	2	Brian Scott	Richard Childress Racing	Chevrolet	47.432	189.745
21	23	Robert Richardson Jr.	R3 Motorsports	Chevrolet	47.454	189.657
22	29	Scott Lagasse Jr.	RAB Racing	Toyota	47.455	189.653
23	3	Ty Dillon (i)	Richard Childress Racing	Chevrolet	47.474	189.577
24	28	Mike Wallace	JGL Racing	Dodge	47.476	189.569
25	87	Joe Nemechek (i)	NEMCO-Jay Robinson Racing	Toyota	47.476	189.569
26	9	Chase Elliott (R)	JR Motorsports	Chevrolet	47.484	189.538
27	62	Brendan Gaughan	Richard Childress Racing	Chevrolet	47.517	189.406
28	00	Jason White	SR² Motorsports	Toyota	47.559	189.239
29	39	Ryan Sieg (R) (i)	RSS Racing	Chevrolet	47.575	189.175
30	43	Dakoda Armstrong (R)	Richard Petty Motorsports	Ford	47.719	188.604
31	6	Trevor Bayne	Roush Fenway Racing	Ford	47.741	188.517
32	40	Josh Wise (i)	The Motorsports Group	Chevrolet	47.941	187.731
Qualified by owner's points
33	51	Jeremy Clements	Jeremy Clements Racing	Chevrolet	47.991	187.535
34	01	Landon Cassill	JD Motorsports	Chevrolet	48.122	187.025
35	70	Derrike Cope	Derrike Cope Racing	Chevrolet	48.885	184.106
36	52	Joey Gase	Jimmy Means Racing	Chevrolet	49.361	182.330
37	4	Jeffrey Earnhardt	JD Motorsports	Chevrolet	49.659	181.236
38	74	Mike Harmon	Mike Harmon Racing	Dodge	50.094	179.662
39	16	Ryan Reed (R)	Roush Fenway Racing	Ford	-	-
Qualified by time
40	84	Chad Boat (R)	Billy Boat Motorsports	Chevrolet	47.559	189.239
Failed to qualify
41	98	David Ragan (i)	Biagi-DenBeste Racing	Ford	47.676	188.774
42	17	Tanner Berryhill (R)	Vision Racing	Dodge	47.688	188.727
43	60	Chris Buescher (R)	Roush Fenway Racing	Ford	47.730	188.561
44	76	Willie Allen (i)	Martins Motorsports	Dodge	47.745	188.501
45	93	Matt Carter	JGL Racing	Dodge	47.761	188.438
46	37	Matt DiBenedetto	Vision Racing	Dodge	47.768	188.411
47	13	Carl Long	MBM Motorsports	Toyota	48.053	187.293
48	15	Carlos Contreras	Rick Ware Racing	Ford	48.565	185.319
49	67	Clay Greenfield (i)	Martins Motorsports	Dodge	48.648	185.002
Official starting lineup

== Race results ==
Fin	St	#	Driver	Team	Make	Laps	Led	Status	Pts	Winnings
1	19	7	Regan Smith	JR Motorsports	Chevrolet	121	35	Running	47	$122,152
2	17	22	Brad Keselowski (i)	Team Penske	Ford	121	11	Running	0	$92,585
3	31	6	Trevor Bayne	Roush Fenway Racing	Ford	121	0	Running	41	$87,066
4	4	54	Kyle Busch (i)	Joe Gibbs Racing	Toyota	121	44	Running	0	$74,785
5	5	11	Elliott Sadler	Joe Gibbs Racing	Toyota	121	0	Running	39	$70,051
6	27	62	Brendan Gaughan	Richard Childress Racing	Chevrolet	121	0	Running	38	$65,276
7	23	3	Ty Dillon (R)	Richard Childress Racing	Chevrolet	121	0	Running	37	$63,776
8	1	31	Dylan Kwasniewski (R)	Turner Scott Motorsports	Chevrolet	121	0	Running	36	$65,601
9	29	39	Ryan Sieg (R) (i)	RSS Racing	Chevrolet	121	0	Running	0	$60,851
10	2	42	Kyle Larson (i)	Turner Scott Motorsports	Chevrolet	121	1	Running	0	$61,001
11	16	88	Dale Earnhardt Jr. (i)	JR Motorsports	Chevrolet	121	28	Running	0	$52,195
12	24	87	Joe Nemechek (i)	NEMCO-Jay Robinson Racing	Toyota	121	0	Running	32	$58,026
13	25	28	Mike Wallace	JGL Racing	Dodge	121	0	Running	31	$51,345
14	6	20	Matt Kenseth (i)	Joe Gibbs Racing	Toyota	121	0	Running	0	$51,020
15	26	9	Chase Elliott (R)	JR Motorsports	Chevrolet	121	0	Running	29	$57,576
16	14	99	James Buescher	RAB Racing	Toyota	121	0	Running	28	$56,826
17	20	2	Brian Scott	Richard Childress Racing	Chevrolet	121	0	Running	27	$56,376
18	39	16	Ryan Reed (R)	Roush Fenway Racing	Ford	121	0	Running	26	$56,251
19	3	30	Danica Patrick (i)	Turner Scott Motorsports	Chevrolet	121	0	Running	0	$50,070
20	12	19	Mike Bliss	TriStar Motorsports	Toyota	121	0	Running	24	$56,701
21	34	01	Landon Cassill	JD Motorsports	Chevrolet	121	0	Running	23	$55,876
22	11	44	Blake Koch	TriStar Motorsports	Toyota	121	0	Running	22	$55,746
23	30	43	Dakoda Armstrong (R)	Richard Petty Motorsports	Ford	121	0	Running	21	$55,571
24	40	84	Chad Boat (R)	Billy Boat Motorsports	Chevrolet	121	0	Running	20	$49,240
25	10	10	David Starr	TriStar Motorsports	Toyota	121	0	Running	19	$55,796
26	22	29	Scott Lagasse Jr.	RAB Racing	Toyota	121	0	Running	18	$55,171
27	7	55	Jamie Dick	Viva Motorsports	Chevrolet	121	2	Running	18	$55,071
28	9	80	Johnny Sauter (i)	Hattori Racing Enterprises	Toyota	120	0	Running	0	$48,765
29	33	51	Jeremy Clements	Jeremy Clements Racing	Chevrolet	120	0	Running	15	$54,871
30	37	4	Jeffrey Earnhardt	JD Motorsports	Chevrolet	120	0	Running	14	$55,046
31	28	00	Jason White	SR² Motorsports	Toyota	119	0	Running	13	$54,571
32	36	52	Joey Gase	Jimmy Means Racing	Chevrolet	119	0	Running	12	$54,476
33	18	85	Bobby Gerhart	Bobby Gerhart Racing	Chevrolet	118	0	Running	11	$54,426
34	38	74	Mike Harmon	Mike Harmon Racing	Dodge	117	0	Running	10	$54,371
35	13	14	Eric McClure	TriStarr Motorsports	Toyota	115	0	Accident	9	$54,204
36	32	40	Josh Wise (i)	The Motorsports Group	Chevrolet	114	0	Running	0	$48,391
37	35	70	Derrike Cope	Derrike Cope Racing	Chevrolet	114	0	Running	7	$48,326
38	21	23	Robert Richardson Jr.	R3 Motorsports	Chevrolet	12	0	Engine	6	$42,059
39	15	24	Harrison Rhodes	SR² Motorsports	Toyota	8	0	Engine	5	$40,960
40	8	91	Jeff Green	TriStar Motorsports	Toyota	3	0	Vibration	4	$40,910
Failed to qualify
41		98	David Ragan (i)	Biagi-DenBeste Racing	Ford					
42		17	Tanner Berryhill (R)	Vision Racing	Dodge					
43		60	Chris Buescher (R)	Roush Fenway Racing	Ford					
44		76	Willie Allen (i)	Martins Motorsports	Dodge					
45		93	Matt Carter	JGL Racing	Dodge					
46		37	Matt DiBenedetto	Vision Racing	Dodge					
47		13	Carl Long	MBM Motorsports	Toyota					
48		15	Carlos Contreras	Rick Ware Racing	Ford					
49		67	Clay Greenfield (i)	Martins Motorsports	Dodge					
Official race results

== Standings after the race ==
Drivers' Championship standings

Pos	Driver	Points
1	Regan Smith	47
2	Trevor Bayne	41 (-6)
3	Elliott Sadler	39 (-8)
4	Brendan Gaughan	38 (–9)
5	Ty Dillon	37 (–10)
6	Dylan Kwasniewski	36 (–11)
7	Joe Nemechek	32 (–15)
8	Mike Wallace	31 (–16)
9	Chase Elliott	29 (–18)
10	James Buescher	28 (–19)
Official driver's standings

- Note: Only the first 10 positions are included for the driver standings.

Previous race: 2013 Ford EcoBoost 300	NASCAR Nationwide Series; 2014 season	Next race: 2014 Blue Jeans Go Green 200
