= 2014 Blue Jeans Go Green 200 =

Second race of the 2014 NASCAR Nationwide Series

2014 Blue Jeans Go Green 200 presented by Cotton, The Fabric of Our Lives
Race details
- Race 2 of 33 of the 2014 NASCAR Nationwide Series
- Date: March 1, 2014
- Official name: 10th Annual Blue Jeans Go Green 200 presented by Cotton, The Fabric of Our Lives
- Location: Avondale, Arizona, Phoenix International Raceway
- Course: Permanent racing facility
- Course length: 1 miles (1.6 km)
- Distance: 168 laps, 168 mi (270.37 km)
- Scheduled distance: 200 laps, 200 mi (321.868 km)
- Average speed: 102.665 miles per hour (165.223 km/h)

Pole position
Driver	Brad Keselowski	Team Penske
- Time: 26.855

Most laps led
Driver	Kyle Busch	Joe Gibbs Racing
- Laps: 155

Winner
No. 54	Kyle Busch	Joe Gibbs Racing

Television in the United States
- Network: ABC
- Announcers: Allen Bestwick, Dale Jarrett, Andy Petree

Radio in the United States
- Radio: Motor Racing Network

The 2014 Blue Jeans Go Green 200 presented by Cotton, The Fabric of Our Lives was the second stock car race of the 2014 NASCAR Nationwide Series season, and the 10th iteration of the event. The race was held on Saturday, March 1, 2014, in Avondale, Arizona at Phoenix International Raceway, a 1-mile (1.6 km) permanent low-banked tri-oval race track. The race was shortened from its scheduled 200 laps to 168 due to inclement weather. At race's end, Kyle Busch, driving for Joe Gibbs Racing, would dominate the race to win his 64th career NASCAR Nationwide Series win and his first of the season. To fill out the podium, Kevin Harvick, driving for JR Motorsports, and Brad Keselowski, driving for Team Penske, would finish second and third, respectively.

== Background ==
The layout of Phoenix International Raceway, the venue where the race was held.

Phoenix International Raceway – also known as PIR – is a one-mile, low-banked tri-oval race track located in Avondale, Arizona. It is named after the nearby metropolitan area of Phoenix. The motorsport track opened in 1964 and currently hosts two NASCAR race weekends annually. PIR has also hosted the IndyCar Series, CART, USAC and the Rolex Sports Car Series. The raceway is currently owned and operated by International Speedway Corporation.

The raceway was originally constructed with a 2.5 mi (4.0 km) road course that ran both inside and outside of the main tri-oval. In 1991 the track was reconfigured with the current 1.51 mi (2.43 km) interior layout. PIR has an estimated grandstand seating capacity of around 67,000. Lights were installed around the track in 2004 following the addition of a second annual NASCAR race weekend.

=== Entry list ===
- (R) denotes rookie driver.
- (i) denotes driver who is ineligible for series driver points.

#	Driver	Team	Make	Sponsor
01	Landon Cassill	JD Motorsports	Chevrolet	Flex Seal
2	Brian Scott	Richard Childress Racing	Chevrolet	Whitetail Club
3	Ty Dillon (R)	Richard Childress Racing	Chevrolet	WESCO
4	Jeffrey Earnhardt	JD Motorsports	Chevrolet	JD Motorsports
6	Trevor Bayne	Roush Fenway Racing	Ford	AdvoCare
7	Regan Smith	JR Motorsports	Chevrolet	TaxSlayer
9	Chase Elliott (R)	JR Motorsports	Chevrolet	NAPA Auto Parts
10	Blake Koch	TriStar Motorsports	Toyota	SupportMilitary.org
11	Elliott Sadler	Joe Gibbs Racing	Toyota	OneMain Financial
14	Eric McClure	TriStar Motorsports	Toyota	Hefty Ultimate
16	Ryan Reed (R)	Roush Fenway Racing	Ford	Lilly Diabetes
17	Tanner Berryhill (R)	Vision Racing	Dodge	BWP Bats
19	Mike Bliss	TriStar Motorsports	Toyota	TriStar Motorsports
20	Matt Kenseth (i)	Joe Gibbs Racing	Toyota	Reser's Fine Foods
22	Brad Keselowski (i)	Team Penske	Ford	Discount Tire
23	Carlos Contreras	Rick Ware Racing	Chevrolet	Voli Vodka
24	Rubén García Jr.	SR² Motorsports	Toyota	HDI Seguros
28	Mike Wallace	JGL Racing	Dodge	JGL Racing
31	Dylan Kwasniewski (R)	Turner Scott Motorsports	Chevrolet	Rockstar, AccuDoc Solutions
39	Ryan Sieg (R) (i)	RSS Racing	Chevrolet	RSS Racing
40	Josh Wise (i)	The Motorsports Group	Chevrolet	The Motorsports Group
42	Kyle Larson (i)	Turner Scott Motorsports	Chevrolet	Cartwheel by Target
43	Dakoda Armstrong (R)	Richard Petty Motorsports	Ford	WinField United
44	Will Kimmel	TriStar Motorsports	Toyota	Ingersoll Rand
46	Matt DiBenedetto	The Motorsports Group	Chevrolet	The Motorsports Group
51	Jeremy Clements	Jeremy Clements Racing	Chevrolet	RepairableVehicles.com
52	Joey Gase	Jimmy Means Racing	Chevrolet	Donate Life
54	Kyle Busch (i)	Joe Gibbs Racing	Toyota	Monster Energy
55	Jamie Dick	Viva Motorsports	Chevrolet	Viva Motorsports
60	Chris Buescher (R)	Roush Fenway Racing	Ford	Ford EcoBoost
62	Brendan Gaughan	Richard Childress Racing	Chevrolet	South Point Hotel, Casino & Spa
70	Derrike Cope	Derrike Cope Racing	Chevrolet	Charlie's Soap
74	Mike Harmon	Mike Harmon Racing	Chevrolet	Mike Harmon Racing
76	Tommy Joe Martins (R)	Martins Motorsports	Ford	Cross Concrete Construction
87	Daryl Harr	JD Motorsports	Chevrolet	iWorld
88	Kevin Harvick (i)	JR Motorsports	Chevrolet	Great Clips
90	Martin Roy	King Autosport	Chevrolet	Veloce, Gamache Truck Center
93	Carl Long	JGL Racing	Dodge	JGL Racing
99	James Buescher	RAB Racing	Toyota	Rheem
Official entry list

== Practice ==
=== First practice ===
The first practice session was held on Friday, February 28, at 11:00 AM MST. The session would last for 50 minutes. Brad Keselowski, driving for Team Penske, would set the fastest time in the session, with a lap of 27.278 and an average speed of 131.974 miles per hour (212.392 km/h).

Pos	#	Driver	Team	Make	Time	Speed
1	22	Brad Keselowski (i)	Team Penske	Ford	27.278	131.974
2	11	Elliott Sadler	Joe Gibbs Racing	Toyota	27.281	131.960
3	54	Kyle Busch (i)	Joe Gibbs Racing	Toyota	27.309	131.825
Full first practice results

=== Second and final practice ===
The final practice session, sometimes known as Happy Hour, was held on Friday, February 28, at 3:00 PM MST. The session would last for one hour and 25 minutes. Kyle Busch, driving for Joe Gibbs Racing, would set the fastest time in the session, with a lap of 27.209 and an average speed of 132.309 miles per hour (212.931 km/h).

Pos	#	Driver	Team	Make	Time	Speed
1	54	Kyle Busch (i)	Joe Gibbs Racing	Toyota	27.209	132.309
2	2	Brian Scott	Richard Childress Racing	Chevrolet	27.236	132.178
3	20	Matt Kenseth (i)	Joe Gibbs Racing	Toyota	27.249	132.115
Full Happy Hour practice results

== Qualifying ==
Qualifying was held on Saturday, March 1, at 10:10 AM MST. Since Phoenix International Raceway is under 1.25 miles (2.01 km) in length, the qualifying system was a multi-car system that included two rounds. The first round was 30 minutes, where every driver would be able to set a lap within the 30 minutes. Then, the second round would consist of the fastest 12 drivers in round 1, and drivers would have 10 minutes to set a time. Whoever set the fastest time in round 2 would win the pole.

Brad Keselowski, driving for Team Penske, would win the pole, setting a time of 26.855 and an average speed of 134.053 miles per hour (215.737 km/h) in the second round.

=== Full qualifying results ===
Pos.	#	Driver	Team	Make	Time (R1)	Speed (R1)	Time (R2)	Speed (R2)
1	22	Brad Keselowski (i)	Team Penske	Ford	-*	-*	26.855	134.053
2	2	Brian Scott	Richard Childress Racing	Chevrolet	-*	-*	26.857	134.043
3	54	Kyle Busch (i)	Joe Gibbs Racing	Toyota	-*	-*	26.870	133.978
4	20	Matt Kenseth (i)	Joe Gibbs Racing	Toyota	-*	-*	26.949	133.586
5	3	Ty Dillon (R)	Richard Childress Racing	Chevrolet	-*	-*	26.996	133.353
6	11	Elliott Sadler	Joe Gibbs Racing	Toyota	-*	-*	26.997	133.348
7	88	Kevin Harvick (i)	JR Motorsports	Chevrolet	-*	-*	27.002	133.323
8	7	Regan Smith	JR Motorsports	Chevrolet	-*	-*	27.061	133.033
9	42	Kyle Larson (i)	Turner Scott Motorsports	Chevrolet	-*	-*	27.080	132.939
10	6	Trevor Bayne	Roush Fenway Racing	Ford	-*	-*	27.105	132.817
11	9	Chase Elliott (R)	JR Motorsports	Chevrolet	-*	-*	27.150	132.597
12	60	Chris Buescher (R)	Roush Fenway Racing	Ford	-*	-*	27.162	132.538
Eliminated in Round 1
13	31	Dylan Kwasniewski (R)	Turner Scott Motorsports	Chevrolet	27.191	132.397	-	-
14	62	Brendan Gaughan	Richard Childress Racing	Chevrolet	27.192	132.392	-	-
15	16	Ryan Reed (R)	Roush Fenway Racing	Ford	27.232	132.197	-	-
16	99	James Buescher	RAB Racing	Toyota	27.236	132.178	-	-
17	19	Mike Bliss	TriStar Motorsports	Toyota	27.454	131.128	-	-
18	39	Ryan Sieg (R) (i)	RSS Racing	Chevrolet	27.472	131.043	-	-
19	01	Landon Cassill	JD Motorsports	Chevrolet	27.717	129.884	-	-
20	43	Dakoda Armstrong (R)	Richard Petty Motorsports	Ford	27.774	129.618	-	-
21	40	Josh Wise (i)	The Motorsports Group	Chevrolet	27.793	129.529	-	-
22	10	Blake Koch	TriStar Motorsports	Toyota	27.804	129.478	-	-
23	17	Tanner Berryhill (R)	Vision Racing	Dodge	27.880	129.125	-	-
24	28	Mike Wallace	JGL Racing	Dodge	27.932	128.884	-	-
25	4	Jeffrey Earnhardt	JD Motorsports	Chevrolet	27.996	128.590	-	-
26	44	Will Kimmel	TriStar Motorsports	Toyota	27.998	128.581	-	-
27	55	Jamie Dick	Viva Motorsports	Chevrolet	28.062	128.287	-	-
28	14	Eric McClure	TriStar Motorsports	Toyota	28.154	127.868	-	-
29	46	Matt DiBenedetto	The Motorsports Group	Chevrolet	28.168	127.805	-	-
30	52	Joey Gase	Jimmy Means Racing	Chevrolet	28.243	127.465	-	-
31	51	Jeremy Clements	Jeremy Clements Racing	Chevrolet	28.269	127.348	-	-
32	24	Rubén García Jr.	SR² Motorsports	Toyota	28.364	126.921	-	-
33	93	Carl Long	JGL Racing	Dodge	28.461	126.489	-	-
34	76	Tommy Joe Martins (R)	Martins Motorsports	Ford	28.528	126.192	-	-
35	70	Derrike Cope	Derrike Cope Racing	Chevrolet	28.614	125.813	-	-
36	74	Mike Harmon	Mike Harmon Racing	Chevrolet	29.612	121.572	-	-
37	87	Daryl Harr	JD Motorsports	Chevrolet	-	-	-	-
38	23	Carlos Contreras	Rick Ware Racing	Chevrolet	-	-	-	-
39	90	Martin Roy	King Autosport	Chevrolet	-	-	-	-
Official starting lineup

*Time unavailable.

== Race results ==
Fin	St	#	Driver	Team	Make	Laps	Led	Status	Pts	Winnings
1	3	54	Kyle Busch (i)	Joe Gibbs Racing	Toyota	168	155	running	0	$67,875
2	7	88	Kevin Harvick (i)	JR Motorsports	Chevrolet	168	4	running	0	$51,200
3	1	22	Brad Keselowski (i)	Team Penske	Ford	168	9	running	0	$40,800
4	9	42	Kyle Larson (i)	Turner Scott Motorsports	Chevrolet	168	0	running	0	$36,732
5	4	20	Matt Kenseth (i)	Joe Gibbs Racing	Toyota	168	0	running	0	$24,375
6	6	11	Elliott Sadler	Joe Gibbs Racing	Toyota	168	0	running	38	$26,331
7	10	6	Trevor Bayne	Roush Fenway Racing	Ford	168	0	running	37	$24,866
8	8	7	Regan Smith	JR Motorsports	Chevrolet	168	0	running	36	$24,776
9	11	9	Chase Elliott (R)	JR Motorsports	Chevrolet	168	0	running	35	$23,631
10	5	3	Ty Dillon (R)	Richard Childress Racing	Chevrolet	168	0	running	34	$22,931
11	2	2	Brian Scott	Richard Childress Racing	Chevrolet	168	0	running	33	$23,081
12	16	99	James Buescher	RAB Racing	Toyota	168	0	running	32	$20,281
13	13	31	Dylan Kwasniewski (R)	Turner Scott Motorsports	Chevrolet	168	0	running	31	$19,706
14	18	39	Ryan Sieg (R) (i)	RSS Racing	Chevrolet	168	0	running	0	$19,331
15	12	60	Chris Buescher (R)	Roush Fenway Racing	Ford	168	0	running	29	$19,931
16	14	62	Brendan Gaughan	Richard Childress Racing	Chevrolet	168	0	running	28	$18,881
17	17	19	Mike Bliss	TriStar Motorsports	Toyota	168	0	running	27	$18,681
18	20	43	Dakoda Armstrong (R)	Richard Petty Motorsports	Ford	167	0	running	26	$18,481
19	19	01	Landon Cassill	JD Motorsports	Chevrolet	167	0	running	25	$18,306
20	24	28	Mike Wallace	JGL Racing	Dodge	166	0	running	24	$12,650
21	31	51	Jeremy Clements	Jeremy Clements Racing	Chevrolet	165	0	running	23	$18,056
22	15	16	Ryan Reed (R)	Roush Fenway Racing	Ford	164	0	crash	22	$17,926
23	28	14	Eric McClure	TriStar Motorsports	Toyota	164	0	running	21	$17,801
24	30	52	Joey Gase	Jimmy Means Racing	Chevrolet	164	0	running	20	$17,701
25	32	24	Rubén García Jr.	SR² Motorsports	Toyota	164	0	running	19	$18,076
26	21	40	Josh Wise (i)	The Motorsports Group	Chevrolet	164	0	running	0	$17,476
27	25	4	Jeffrey Earnhardt	JD Motorsports	Chevrolet	164	0	running	17	$17,351
28	23	17	Tanner Berryhill (R)	Vision Racing	Dodge	163	0	running	16	$17,276
29	38	23	Carlos Contreras	Rick Ware Racing	Chevrolet	163	0	running	15	$17,226
30	39	90	Martin Roy	King Autosport	Chevrolet	160	0	running	14	$11,270
31	36	74	Mike Harmon	Mike Harmon Racing	Chevrolet	149	0	running	13	$17,121
32	27	55	Jamie Dick	Viva Motorsports	Chevrolet	131	0	engine	12	$17,061
33	26	44	Will Kimmel	TriStar Motorsports	Toyota	117	0	running	11	$17,021
34	35	70	Derrike Cope	Derrike Cope Racing	Chevrolet	86	0	crash	10	$16,986
35	34	76	Tommy Joe Martins (R)	Martins Motorsports	Ford	40	0	electrical	9	$10,740
36	37	87	Daryl Harr	JD Motorsports	Chevrolet	18	0	crash	8	$16,181
37	33	93	Carl Long	JGL Racing	Dodge	13	0	brakes	7	$9,940
38	29	46	Matt DiBenedetto	The Motorsports Group	Chevrolet	6	0	electrical	6	$9,886
39	22	10	Blake Koch	TriStar Motorsports	Toyota	3	0	vibration	5	$9,770
Official race results

== Standings after the race ==
Drivers' Championship standings

Pos	Driver	Points
1	Regan Smith	83
2	Trevor Bayne	78 (-5)
3	Elliott Sadler	77 (-6)
4	Ty Dillon	71 (–12)
5	Dylan Kwasniewski	67 (–16)
6	Brendan Gaughan	66 (–17)
7	Chase Elliott	64 (–19)
8	Brian Scott	60 (–23)
9	James Buescher	60 (–23)
10	Mike Wallace	55 (–28)
Official driver's standings

- Note: Only the first 10 positions are included for the driver standings.

Previous race: 2014 DRIVE4COPD 300	NASCAR Nationwide Series; 2014 season	Next race: 2014 Boyd Gaming 300
