= 2014 Boyd Gaming 300 =

Third race of the 2014 NASCAR Nationwide Series

Race details
- Race 3 of 33 of the 2014 NASCAR Nationwide Series
- Date: March 8, 2014
- Official name: 18th Annual Boyd Gaming 300
- Location: North Las Vegas, Nevada, Las Vegas Motor Speedway
- Course: Permanent racing facility
- Course length: 1.5 miles (2.41 km)
- Distance: 200 laps, 300 mi (482.803 km)
- Scheduled distance: 200 laps, 300 mi (482.803 km)
- Average speed: 131.997 miles per hour (212.429 km/h)

Pole position
Driver	Ty Dillon	Richard Childress Racing
- Time: 29.625

Most laps led
Driver	Brad Keselowski	Team Penske
- Laps: 144

Winner
No. 22	Brad Keselowski	Team Penske

Television in the United States
- Network: ESPN2
- Announcers: Allen Bestwick, Dale Jarrett, Andy Petree

Radio in the United States
- Radio: Performance Racing Network

The 2014 Boyd Gaming 300 was the third stock car race of the 2014 NASCAR Nationwide Series season, and the 18th iteration of the event. The race was held on Saturday, March 8, 2014, in North Las Vegas, Nevada at Las Vegas Motor Speedway, a 1.5 miles (2.4 km) permanent D-shaped oval racetrack. The race took the scheduled 200 laps to complete. At race's end, Brad Keselowski, driving for Team Penske, would complete a dominant performance to win his 28th career NASCAR Nationwide Series win and his first of the season. To fill out the podium, Kyle Busch, driving for Joe Gibbs Racing, and Kyle Larson, driving for Turner Scott Motorsports, would finish second and third, respectively.

== Background ==
The layout of Las Vegas Motor Speedway, the venue where the race was held.

Las Vegas Motor Speedway, located in Clark County, Nevada outside the Las Vegas city limits and about 15 miles northeast of the Las Vegas Strip, is a 1,200-acre (490 ha) complex of multiple tracks for motorsports racing. The complex is owned by Speedway Motorsports, Inc., which is headquartered in Charlotte, North Carolina.

=== Entry list ===
- (R) denotes rookie driver.
- (i) denotes driver who is ineligible for series driver points.

#	Driver	Team	Make	Sponsor
01	Landon Cassill	JD Motorsports	Chevrolet	G&K Services
2	Brian Scott	Richard Childress Racing	Chevrolet	Whitetail Club
3	Ty Dillon (R)	Richard Childress Racing	Chevrolet	Jiffy Lube
4	Jeffrey Earnhardt	JD Motorsports	Chevrolet	Flex Seal
6	Trevor Bayne	Roush Fenway Racing	Ford	AdvoCare
7	Regan Smith	JR Motorsports	Chevrolet	NAPA Synthetic Motor Oil
9	Chase Elliott (R)	JR Motorsports	Chevrolet	NAPA Auto Parts
10	Jeff Green	TriStar Motorsports	Toyota	SupportMilitary.org
11	Elliott Sadler	Joe Gibbs Racing	Toyota	Interstate Batteries
14	Eric McClure	TriStar Motorsports	Toyota	Hefty Ultimate
16	Ryan Reed (R)	Roush Fenway Racing	Ford	Lilly Diabetes
17	Tanner Berryhill (R)	Vision Racing	Dodge	BWP Bats
19	Mike Bliss	TriStar Motorsports	Toyota	TriStar Motorsports
20	Matt Kenseth (i)	Joe Gibbs Racing	Toyota	GameStop, ChargeBase
22	Brad Keselowski (i)	Team Penske	Ford	Discount Tire
23	Robert Richardson Jr.	R3 Motorsports	Chevrolet	CornBoard
24	Ryan Ellis	SR² Motorsports	Toyota	Superlite Cars
28	Mike Wallace	JGL Racing	Dodge	JGL Racing
31	Dylan Kwasniewski (R)	Turner Scott Motorsports	Chevrolet	Rockstar, AccuDoc Solutions
33	Matt Crafton (i)	Richard Childress Racing	Chevrolet	Menards, Tarkett
39	Ryan Sieg (R) (i)	RSS Racing	Chevrolet	Pull-A-Part
40	Josh Wise (i)	The Motorsports Group	Chevrolet	The Motorsports Group
42	Kyle Larson (i)	Turner Scott Motorsports	Chevrolet	Cartwheel by Target
43	Dakoda Armstrong (R)	Richard Petty Motorsports	Ford	WinField United
44	Blake Koch	TriStar Motorsports	Toyota	TriStar Motorsports
46	Matt DiBenedetto	The Motorsports Group	Chevrolet	The Motorsports Group
51	Jeremy Clements	Jeremy Clements Racing	Chevrolet	Gold & Silver Pawn Shop
52	Joey Gase	Jimmy Means Racing	Chevrolet	Donate Life Nevada
54	Kyle Busch (i)	Joe Gibbs Racing	Toyota	Monster Energy
55	Jamie Dick	Viva Motorsports	Chevrolet	Viva Motorsports
60	Chris Buescher (R)	Roush Fenway Racing	Ford	Ford EcoBoost
62	Brendan Gaughan	Richard Childress Racing	Chevrolet	South Point Hotel, Casino & Spa
70	Derrike Cope	Derrike Cope Racing	Chevrolet	Charlie's Soap
74	Kevin Lepage	Mike Harmon Racing	Dodge	Mike Harmon Racing
76	Tommy Joe Martins (R)	Martins Motorsports	Ford	Cross Concrete Construction
87	Daryl Harr	JD Motorsports	Chevrolet	Champions Against Bullying, PasmaCar
88	Dale Earnhardt Jr. (i)	JR Motorsports	Chevrolet	TaxSlayer
93	J. J. Yeley (i)	JGL Racing	Dodge	JGL Racing
98	David Ragan (i)	Biagi-DenBeste Racing	Ford	Ritchie Bros. Auctioneers
99	James Buescher	RAB Racing	Toyota	Rheem
Official entry list

== Practice ==
=== First practice ===
The first practice session was held on Friday, March 7, at 12:40 PM PST. The session would last for 50 minutes. Matt Crafton, driving for Richard Childress Racing, would set the fastest time in the session, with a lap of 30.399 and an average speed of 177.637 miles per hour (285.879 km/h).

Pos.	#	Driver	Team	Make	Time	Speed
1	33	Matt Crafton (i)	Richard Childress Racing	Chevrolet	30.399	177.637
2	54	Kyle Busch (i)	Joe Gibbs Racing	Toyota	30.419	177.521
3	3	Ty Dillon (R)	Richard Childress Racing	Chevrolet	30.460	177.282
Full first practice results

=== Second and final practice ===
The final practice session, sometimes referred to as Happy Hour, was held on Friday, March 7, at 2:00 PM PST. The session would last for one hour and 20 minutes. Ty Dillon, driving for Richard Childress Racing, would set the fastest time in the session, with a lap of 30.086 and an average speed of 179.485 miles per hour (288.853 km/h).

Pos.	#	Driver	Team	Make	Time	Speed
1	3	Ty Dillon (R)	Richard Childress Racing	Chevrolet	30.086	179.485
2	9	Chase Elliott (R)	JR Motorsports	Chevrolet	30.261	178.448
3	60	Chris Buescher (R)	Roush Fenway Racing	Ford	30.265	178.424
Full Happy Hour practice results

== Qualifying ==
Qualifying was held on Saturday, March 8, at 9:40 AM PST. Since Las Vegas Motor Speedway is at least 1.25 miles (2.01 km) in length, the qualifying system was a multi-car system that included three rounds. The first round was 25 minutes, where every driver would be able to set a lap within the 25 minutes. Then, the second round would consist of the fastest 24 cars in Round 1, and drivers would have 10 minutes to set a lap. Round 3 consisted of the fastest 12 drivers from Round 2, and the drivers would have 5 minutes to set a time. Whoever was fastest in Round 3 would win the pole.

Ty Dillon, driving for Richard Childress Racing, would win the pole after setting a time of 29.625 and an average speed of 182.278 mph (293.348 km/h) in the third round.

No drivers would fail to qualify.

=== Full qualifying results ===
Pos.	#	Driver	Team	Make	Time (R1)	Speed (R1)	Time (R2)	Speed (R2)	Time (R3)	Speed (R3)
1	3	Ty Dillon (R)	Richard Childress Racing	Chevrolet	-*	-*	-*	-*	29.625	182.278
2	22	Brad Keselowski (i)	Team Penske	Ford	-*	-*	-*	-*	29.719	181.702
3	88	Dale Earnhardt Jr. (i)	JR Motorsports	Chevrolet	-*	-*	-*	-*	29.810	181.147
4	42	Kyle Larson (i)	Turner Scott Motorsports	Chevrolet	-*	-*	-*	-*	29.854	180.880
5	2	Brian Scott	Richard Childress Racing	Chevrolet	-*	-*	-*	-*	29.884	180.699
6	20	Matt Kenseth (i)	Joe Gibbs Racing	Toyota	-*	-*	-*	-*	29.925	180.451
7	54	Kyle Busch (i)	Joe Gibbs Racing	Toyota	-*	-*	-*	-*	29.933	180.403
8	31	Dylan Kwasniewski (R)	Turner Scott Motorsports	Chevrolet	-*	-*	-*	-*	29.972	180.168
9	9	Chase Elliott (R)	JR Motorsports	Chevrolet	-*	-*	-*	-*	30.000	180.000
10	7	Regan Smith	JR Motorsports	Chevrolet	-*	-*	-*	-*	30.093	179.444
11	33	Matt Crafton (i)	Richard Childress Racing	Chevrolet	-*	-*	-*	-*	30.195	178.838
12	60	Chris Buescher (R)	Roush Fenway Racing	Ford	-*	-*	-*	-*	30.221	178.684
Eliminated in Round 2
13	11	Elliott Sadler	Joe Gibbs Racing	Toyota	-*	-*	30.156	179.069	-	-
14	99	James Buescher	RAB Racing	Toyota	-*	-*	30.167	179.004	-	-
15	16	Ryan Reed (R)	Roush Fenway Racing	Ford	-*	-*	30.193	178.849	-	-
16	62	Brendan Gaughan	Richard Childress Racing	Chevrolet	-*	-*	30.197	178.826	-	-
17	6	Trevor Bayne	Roush Fenway Racing	Ford	-*	-*	30.280	178.336	-	-
18	44	Blake Koch	TriStar Motorsports	Toyota	-*	-*	30.288	178.288	-	-
19	98	David Ragan (i)	Biagi-DenBeste Racing	Ford	-*	-*	30.405	177.602	-	-
20	19	Mike Bliss	TriStar Motorsports	Toyota	-*	-*	30.452	177.328	-	-
21	43	Dakoda Armstrong (R)	Richard Petty Motorsports	Ford	-*	-*	30.466	177.247	-	-
22	39	Ryan Sieg (R) (i)	RSS Racing	Chevrolet	-*	-*	30.698	175.907	-	-
23	40	Josh Wise (i)	The Motorsports Group	Chevrolet	-*	-*	30.741	175.661	-	-
24	01	Landon Cassill	JD Motorsports	Chevrolet	-*	-*	30.810	175.268	-	-
Eliminated in Round 1
25	93	J. J. Yeley (i)	JGL Racing	Dodge	30.832	175.143	-	-	-	-
26	55	Jamie Dick	Viva Motorsports	Chevrolet	30.931	174.582	-	-	-	-
27	17	Tanner Berryhill (R)	Vision Racing	Dodge	30.983	174.289	-	-	-	-
28	28	Mike Wallace	JGL Racing	Dodge	31.024	174.059	-	-	-	-
29	51	Jeremy Clements	Jeremy Clements Racing	Chevrolet	31.041	173.963	-	-	-	-
30	14	Eric McClure	TriStar Motorsports	Toyota	31.128	173.477	-	-	-	-
31	4	Jeffrey Earnhardt	JD Motorsports	Chevrolet	31.132	173.455	-	-	-	-
32	10	Jeff Green	TriStar Motorsports	Toyota	31.147	173.371	-	-	-	-
33	74	Kevin Lepage	Mike Harmon Racing	Dodge	31.302	172.513	-	-	-	-
34	76	Tommy Joe Martins (R)	Martins Motorsports	Ford	31.340	172.304	-	-	-	-
35	70	Derrike Cope	Derrike Cope Racing	Chevrolet	31.612	170.821	-	-	-	-
36	52	Joey Gase	Jimmy Means Racing	Toyota	31.624	170.756	-	-	-	-
37	87	Daryl Harr	JD Motorsports	Chevrolet	31.741	170.127	-	-	-	-
38	24	Ryan Ellis	SR² Motorsports	Toyota	31.834	169.630	-	-	-	-
Qualified by owner's points
39	23	Robert Richardson Jr.	R3 Motorsports	Chevrolet	32.244	167.473	-	-	-	-
Last car to qualify on time
40	46	Matt DiBenedetto	The Motorsports Group	Chevrolet	31.493	171.467	-	-	-	-
Official starting lineup

*Time not available.

== Race results ==
Fin	St	#	Driver	Team	Make	Laps	Led	Status	Pts	Winnings
1	2	22	Brad Keselowski (i)	Team Penske	Ford	200	144	running	0	$92,995
2	7	54	Kyle Busch (i)	Joe Gibbs Racing	Toyota	200	33	running	0	$63,450
3	4	42	Kyle Larson (i)	Turner Scott Motorsports	Chevrolet	200	9	running	0	$51,550
4	3	88	Dale Earnhardt Jr. (i)	JR Motorsports	Chevrolet	200	0	running	0	$33,700
5	9	9	Chase Elliott (R)	JR Motorsports	Chevrolet	200	0	running	39	$35,775
6	6	20	Matt Kenseth (i)	Joe Gibbs Racing	Toyota	200	7	running	0	$25,775
7	5	2	Brian Scott	Richard Childress Racing	Chevrolet	200	0	running	37	$32,325
8	17	6	Trevor Bayne	Roush Fenway Racing	Ford	200	0	running	36	$29,050
9	12	60	Chris Buescher (R)	Roush Fenway Racing	Ford	200	0	running	35	$27,960
10	10	7	Regan Smith	JR Motorsports	Chevrolet	199	0	running	34	$29,650
11	1	3	Ty Dillon (R)	Richard Childress Racing	Chevrolet	198	7	running	34	$30,250
12	11	33	Matt Crafton (i)	Richard Childress Racing	Chevrolet	198	0	running	0	$26,300
13	13	11	Elliott Sadler	Joe Gibbs Racing	Toyota	198	0	running	31	$25,750
14	20	19	Mike Bliss	TriStar Motorsports	Toyota	198	0	running	30	$25,240
15	15	16	Ryan Reed (R)	Roush Fenway Racing	Ford	197	0	running	29	$25,830
16	16	62	Brendan Gaughan	Richard Childress Racing	Chevrolet	197	0	running	28	$24,770
17	19	98	David Ragan (i)	Biagi-DenBeste Racing	Ford	197	0	running	0	$18,585
18	14	99	James Buescher	RAB Racing	Toyota	197	0	running	26	$24,450
19	24	01	Landon Cassill	JD Motorsports	Chevrolet	196	0	running	25	$24,340
20	18	44	Blake Koch	TriStar Motorsports	Toyota	195	0	running	24	$24,930
21	25	93	J. J. Yeley (i)	JGL Racing	Dodge	195	0	running	0	$18,120
22	22	39	Ryan Sieg (R) (i)	RSS Racing	Chevrolet	195	0	running	0	$23,980
23	21	43	Dakoda Armstrong (R)	Richard Petty Motorsports	Ford	194	0	running	21	$23,845
24	8	31	Dylan Kwasniewski (R)	Turner Scott Motorsports	Chevrolet	193	0	running	20	$23,735
25	27	17	Tanner Berryhill (R)	Vision Racing	Dodge	193	0	running	19	$24,085
26	28	28	Mike Wallace	JGL Racing	Dodge	192	0	running	18	$17,440
27	30	14	Eric McClure	TriStar Motorsports	Toyota	192	0	running	17	$23,305
28	38	24	Ryan Ellis	SR² Motorsports	Toyota	191	0	running	16	$23,160
29	26	55	Jamie Dick	Viva Motorsports	Chevrolet	190	0	running	15	$23,010
30	37	87	Daryl Harr	JD Motorsports	Chevrolet	190	0	running	14	$23,175
31	39	23	Robert Richardson Jr.	R3 Motorsports	Chevrolet	190	0	running	13	$22,745
32	29	51	Jeremy Clements	Jeremy Clements Racing	Chevrolet	190	0	running	12	$22,635
33	31	4	Jeffrey Earnhardt	JD Motorsports	Chevrolet	189	0	running	11	$22,520
34	33	74	Kevin Lepage	Mike Harmon Racing	Dodge	188	0	running	10	$22,409
35	35	70	Derrike Cope	Derrike Cope Racing	Chevrolet	178	0	running	9	$22,289
36	36	52	Joey Gase	Jimmy Means Racing	Toyota	133	0	engine	8	$20,820
37	23	40	Josh Wise (i)	The Motorsports Group	Chevrolet	82	0	suspension	0	$20,775
38	40	46	Matt DiBenedetto	The Motorsports Group	Chevrolet	8	0	electrical	6	$14,740
39	34	76	Tommy Joe Martins (R)	Martins Motorsports	Ford	8	0	rear gear	5	$14,490
40	32	10	Jeff Green	TriStar Motorsports	Toyota	3	0	vibration	4	$14,455
Official race results

== Standings after the race ==
Drivers' Championship standings

Pos	Driver	Points
1	Regan Smith	117
2	Trevor Bayne	114 (-3)
3	Elliott Sadler	108 (-9)
4	Ty Dillon	105 (–12)
5	Chase Elliott	103 (–14)
6	Brian Scott	97 (–20)
7	Brendan Gaughan	94 (–23)
8	Dylan Kwasniewski	87 (–30)
9	James Buescher	86 (–31)
10	Mike Bliss	81 (–36)
Official driver's standings

- Note: Only the first 10 positions are included for the driver standings.

Previous race: 2014 Blue Jeans Go Green 200	NASCAR Nationwide Series; 2014 season	Next race: 2014 Drive to Stop Diabetes 300
