= 2014 Drive to Stop Diabetes 300 =

Fourth race of the 2014 NASCAR Nationwide Series

2014 Drive to Stop Diabetes 300 presented by Lilly Diabetes
Race details
- Race 4 of 33 of the 2014 NASCAR Nationwide Series
- Date: March 15, 2014
- Official name: 32nd Annual Drive to Stop Diabetes 300 presented by Lilly Diabetes
- Location: Bristol, Tennessee, Bristol Motor Speedway
- Course: Permanent racing facility
- Course length: 0.533 miles (0.858 km)
- Distance: 300 laps, 159.9 mi (257.334 km)
- Scheduled distance: 300 laps, 159.9 mi (257.334 km)
- Average speed: 87.165 miles per hour (140.278 km/h)

Pole position
Driver	Kyle Larson	Turner Scott Motorsports
- Time: 15.415

Most laps led
Driver	Matt Kenseth	Joe Gibbs Racing
- Laps: 178

Winner
No. 54	Kyle Busch	Joe Gibbs Racing

Television in the United States
- Network: ESPN2
- Announcers: Allen Bestwick, Dale Jarrett, Andy Petree

Radio in the United States
- Radio: Performance Racing Network

The 2014 Drive to Stop Diabetes 300 presented by Lilly Diabetes was the fourth stock car race of the 2014 NASCAR Nationwide Series season, and the 32nd iteration of the event. The race was held on Saturday, March 15, 2014, in Bristol, Tennessee, at Bristol Motor Speedway, a 0.533 miles (0.858 km) permanent oval-shaped racetrack. The race took the scheduled 300 laps to complete. On the final restart with nine to go, Kyle Busch, driving for Joe Gibbs Racing, would hold off the field to win his 65th career NASCAR Nationwide Series win and his second of the season. To fill out the podium, Kyle Larson, driving for Turner Scott Motorsports, and Kevin Harvick, driving for JR Motorsports, would finish second and third, respectively.

== Background ==
The layout of Bristol Motor Speedway, the venue where the race was held.

The Bristol Motor Speedway, formerly known as Bristol International Raceway and Bristol Raceway, is a NASCAR short track venue located in Bristol, Tennessee. Constructed in 1960, it held its first NASCAR race on July 30, 1961. Despite its short length, Bristol is among the most popular tracks on the NASCAR schedule because of its distinct features, which include extraordinarily steep banking, an all concrete surface, two pit roads, and stadium-like seating. It has also been named one of the loudest NASCAR tracks.

=== Entry list ===
- (R) denotes rookie driver.
- (i) denotes driver who is ineligible for series driver points.

#	Driver	Team	Make	Sponsor
01	Landon Cassill	JD Motorsports	Chevrolet	JD Motorsports
2	Brian Scott	Richard Childress Racing	Chevrolet	Shore Lodge
3	Ty Dillon (R)	Richard Childress Racing	Chevrolet	Yuengling Light Lager
4	Jeffrey Earnhardt	JD Motorsports	Chevrolet	Flex Seal
5	Kevin Harvick (i)	JR Motorsports	Chevrolet	Armour Vienna Sausage
6	Trevor Bayne	Roush Fenway Racing	Ford	AdvoCare
7	Regan Smith	JR Motorsports	Chevrolet	TaxSlayer
9	Chase Elliott (R)	JR Motorsports	Chevrolet	NAPA Auto Parts
10	Blake Koch	TriStar Motorsports	Toyota	SupportMilitary.org
11	Elliott Sadler	Joe Gibbs Racing	Toyota	OneMain Financial
13	Matt Carter (i)	MBM Motorsports	Toyota	MBM Motorsports
14	Eric McClure	TriStar Motorsports	Toyota	Hefty Ultimate
16	Ryan Reed (R)	Roush Fenway Racing	Ford	Lilly Diabetes
17	Tanner Berryhill (R)	Vision Racing	Dodge	BWP Bats
19	Mike Bliss	TriStar Motorsports	Toyota	TriStar Motorsports
20	Matt Kenseth (i)	Joe Gibbs Racing	Toyota	GameStop, Titanfall
22	Ryan Blaney (i)	Team Penske	Ford	Discount Tire, SKF
23	Timmy Hill (i)	Rick Ware Racing	Chevrolet	Lilly Trucking
24	Rubén García Jr.	SR² Motorsports	Toyota	HDI Seguros
28	Mike Wallace	JGL Racing	Dodge	JGL Racing
29	Kelly Admiraal	RAB Racing	Toyota	Swan Rentals
31	Dylan Kwasniewski (R)	Turner Scott Motorsports	Chevrolet	Rockstar, AccuDoc Solutions
33	Cale Conley (i)	Richard Childress Racing	Chevrolet	Okuma
39	Ryan Sieg (i)	RSS Racing	Chevrolet	RSS Racing
40	Josh Wise (i)	The Motorsports Group	Chevrolet	The Motorsports Group
42	Kyle Larson (i)	Turner Scott Motorsports	Chevrolet	Cartwheel by Target
43	Dakoda Armstrong (R)	Richard Petty Motorsports	Ford	Fresh from Florida
44	Will Kimmel	TriStar Motorsports	Toyota	Ingersoll Rand
46	Matt DiBenedetto	The Motorsports Group	Chevrolet	The Motorsports Group
51	Jeremy Clements	Jeremy Clements Racing	Chevrolet	All South Electric
52	Joey Gase	Jimmy Means Racing	Chevrolet	K&J Auto Sales, Pray For Your Pastor Tour
54	Kyle Busch (i)	Joe Gibbs Racing	Toyota	Monster Energy
55	Jamie Dick	Viva Motorsports	Chevrolet	Viva Motorsports
60	Chris Buescher (R)	Roush Fenway Racing	Ford	Ford EcoBoost
62	Brendan Gaughan	Richard Childress Racing	Chevrolet	South Point Hotel, Casino & Spa, El Cortez
67	Tommy Joe Martins*	Martins Motorsports	Dodge	Cross Concrete Construction
70	Derrike Cope	Derrike Cope Racing	Chevrolet	Charlie's Soap
74	Kevin Lepage	Mike Harmon Racing	Dodge	Mike Harmon Racing
76	Willie Allen	Martins Motorsports	Dodge	Diamond Gusset Jeans, Land No Tax
87	Joe Nemechek (i)	NEMCO-Jay Robinson Racing	Toyota	Wood Pellet Grills, D. A. B. Constructors
93	Carl Long	JGL Racing	Dodge	JGL Racing
99	James Buescher	RAB Racing	Toyota	Rheem
Official entry list

*Withdrew after wrecking in first practice.

== Practice ==
=== First practice ===
The first practice session was held on Friday, March 1, at 1:40 PM EST. The session would last for 50 minutes. Kyle Busch, driving for Joe Gibbs Racing, would set the fastest time in the session, with a lap of 15.590 and an average speed of 123.079 miles per hour (198.076 km/h).

Pos.	#	Driver	Team	Make	Time	Speed
1	54	Kyle Busch (i)	Joe Gibbs Racing	Toyota	15.590	123.079
2	20	Matt Kenseth (i)	Joe Gibbs Racing	Toyota	15.687	122.318
3	42	Kyle Larson (i)	Turner Scott Motorsports	Chevrolet	15.727	122.007
Full first practice results

=== Second and final practice ===
The final practice session, sometimes known as Happy Hour, was held on Friday, March 1, at 3:00 PM EST. The session would last for one hour and 25 minutes. Chase Elliott, driving for JR Motorsports, would set the fastest time in the session, with a lap of 15.455 and an average speed of 124.154 miles per hour (199.806 km/h).

Pos.	#	Driver	Team	Make	Time	Speed
1	9	Chase Elliott (R)	JR Motorsports	Chevrolet	15.455	124.154
2	42	Kyle Larson (i)	Turner Scott Motorsports	Chevrolet	15.478	123.970
3	20	Matt Kenseth (i)	Joe Gibbs Racing	Toyota	15.485	123.913
Full Happy Hour practice results

== Qualifying ==
Qualifying was held on Saturday, March 15, at 10:10 AM EST. Since Bristol Motor Speedway is under 1.25 miles (2.01 km) in length, the qualifying system was a multi-car system that included two rounds. The first round was 30 minutes, where every driver would be able to set a lap within the 30 minutes. Then, the second round would consist of the fastest 12 drivers in round 1, and drivers would have 10 minutes to set a time. Whoever set the fastest time in round 2 would win the pole.

Kyle Larson, driving for Turner Scott Motorsports, would win the pole, setting a time of 15.415 and an average speed of 124.476 miles per hour (200.325 km/h) in the second round.

Willie Allen was the only driver to fail to qualify.

=== Full qualifying results ===
Pos.	#	Driver	Team	Make	Time (R1)	Speed (R1)	Time (R2)	Speed (R2)
1	42	Kyle Larson (i)	Turner Scott Motorsports	Chevrolet	-*	-*	15.415	124.476
2	54	Kyle Busch (i)	Joe Gibbs Racing	Toyota	-*	-*	15.436	124.307
3	20	Matt Kenseth (i)	Joe Gibbs Racing	Toyota	-*	-*	15.451	124.186
4	2	Brian Scott	Richard Childress Racing	Chevrolet	-*	-*	15.525	123.594
5	22	Ryan Blaney (i)	Team Penske	Ford	-*	-*	15.561	123.308
6	5	Kevin Harvick (i)	JR Motorsports	Chevrolet	-*	-*	15.575	123.197
7	7	Regan Smith	JR Motorsports	Chevrolet	-*	-*	15.579	123.166
8	99	James Buescher	RAB Racing	Toyota	-*	-*	15.658	122.544
9	3	Ty Dillon (R)	Richard Childress Racing	Chevrolet	-*	-*	15.748	121.844
10	19	Mike Bliss	TriStar Motorsports	Toyota	-*	-*	15.758	121.767
11	31	Dylan Kwasniewski (R)	Turner Scott Motorsports	Chevrolet	-*	-*	15.828	121.228
12	33	Cale Conley (i)	Richard Childress Racing	Chevrolet	-*	-*	15.877	120.854
Eliminated in Round 1
13	60	Chris Buescher (R)	Roush Fenway Racing	Ford	15.532	123.539	-	-
14	6	Trevor Bayne	Roush Fenway Racing	Ford	15.543	123.451	-	-
15	9	Chase Elliott (R)	JR Motorsports	Chevrolet	15.561	123.308	-	-
16	46	Matt DiBenedetto	The Motorsports Group	Chevrolet	15.575	123.197	-	-
17	4	Jeffrey Earnhardt	JD Motorsports	Chevrolet	15.605	122.961	-	-
18	11	Elliott Sadler	Joe Gibbs Racing	Toyota	15.609	122.929	-	-
19	39	Ryan Sieg (i)	RSS Racing	Chevrolet	15.616	122.874	-	-
20	62	Brendan Gaughan	Richard Childress Racing	Chevrolet	15.637	122.709	-	-
21	16	Ryan Reed (R)	Roush Fenway Racing	Ford	15.676	122.404	-	-
22	44	Will Kimmel	TriStar Motorsports	Toyota	15.724	122.030	-	-
23	40	Josh Wise (i)	The Motorsports Group	Chevrolet	15.739	121.914	-	-
24	10	Blake Koch	TriStar Motorsports	Toyota	15.741	121.898	-	-
25	23	Timmy Hill (i)	Rick Ware Racing	Chevrolet	15.771	121.666	-	-
26	01	Landon Cassill	JD Motorsports	Chevrolet	15.807	121.389	-	-
27	29	Kelly Admiraal	RAB Racing	Toyota	15.859	120.991	-	-
28	28	Mike Wallace	JGL Racing	Dodge	15.908	120.619	-	-
29	43	Dakoda Armstrong (R)	Richard Petty Motorsports	Ford	15.919	120.535	-	-
30	51	Jeremy Clements	Jeremy Clements Racing	Chevrolet	15.924	120.497	-	-
31	17	Tanner Berryhill (R)	Vision Racing	Dodge	15.970	120.150	-	-
32	93	Carl Long	JGL Racing	Dodge	15.997	119.947	-	-
33	74	Kevin Lepage	Mike Harmon Racing	Dodge	16.004	119.895	-	-
34	87	Joe Nemechek (i)	NEMCO-Jay Robinson Racing	Toyota	16.007	119.873	-	-
35	14	Eric McClure	TriStar Motorsports	Toyota	16.021	119.768	-	-
36	70	Derrike Cope	Derrike Cope Racing	Chevrolet	16.057	119.499	-	-
37	55	Jamie Dick	Viva Motorsports	Chevrolet	16.107	119.128	-	-
38	52	Joey Gase	Jimmy Means Racing	Chevrolet	16.127	118.981	-	-
Qualified by owner's points
39	24	Rubén García Jr.	SR² Motorsports	Toyota	16.481	116.425	-	-
Last car to qualify on time
40	13	Matt Carter (i)	MBM Motorsports	Toyota	16.081	119.321	-	-
Failed to qualify
41	76	Willie Allen	Martins Motorsports	Dodge	16.387	117.093	-	-
Official starting lineup

*Time unavailable.

== Race results ==
Fin	St	#	Driver	Team	Make	Laps	Led	Status	Pts	Winnings
1	2	54	Kyle Busch (i)	Joe Gibbs Racing	Toyota	300	120	running	0	$47,325
2	1	42	Kyle Larson (i)	Turner Scott Motorsports	Chevrolet	300	2	running	0	$44,100
3	6	5	Kevin Harvick (i)	JR Motorsports	Chevrolet	300	0	running	0	$29,100
4	5	22	Ryan Blaney (i)	Team Penske	Ford	300	0	running	0	$31,825
5	3	20	Matt Kenseth (i)	Joe Gibbs Racing	Toyota	300	178	running	0	$27,775
6	9	3	Ty Dillon (R)	Richard Childress Racing	Chevrolet	300	0	running	38	$29,200
7	20	62	Brendan Gaughan	Richard Childress Racing	Chevrolet	300	0	running	37	$27,635
8	14	6	Trevor Bayne	Roush Fenway Racing	Ford	300	0	running	36	$29,595
9	15	9	Chase Elliott (R)	JR Motorsports	Chevrolet	300	0	running	35	$27,275
10	7	7	Regan Smith	JR Motorsports	Chevrolet	300	0	running	34	$29,275
11	12	33	Cale Conley (i)	Richard Childress Racing	Chevrolet	300	0	running	0	$26,725
12	26	01	Landon Cassill	JD Motorsports	Chevrolet	300	0	running	32	$26,625
13	8	99	James Buescher	RAB Racing	Toyota	299	0	running	31	$26,525
14	4	2	Brian Scott	Richard Childress Racing	Chevrolet	299	0	running	30	$26,475
15	11	31	Dylan Kwasniewski (R)	Turner Scott Motorsports	Chevrolet	298	0	running	29	$27,050
16	13	60	Chris Buescher (R)	Roush Fenway Racing	Ford	298	0	running	28	$26,550
17	18	11	Elliott Sadler	Joe Gibbs Racing	Toyota	297	0	running	27	$26,300
18	30	51	Jeremy Clements	Jeremy Clements Racing	Chevrolet	297	0	running	26	$26,250
19	34	87	Joe Nemechek (i)	NEMCO-Jay Robinson Racing	Toyota	297	0	running	0	$26,150
20	19	39	Ryan Sieg (i)	RSS Racing	Chevrolet	296	0	running	0	$26,800
21	25	23	Timmy Hill (i)	Rick Ware Racing	Chevrolet	296	0	running	0	$26,025
22	22	44	Will Kimmel	TriStar Motorsports	Toyota	294	0	running	22	$25,970
23	37	55	Jamie Dick	Viva Motorsports	Chevrolet	294	0	running	21	$25,920
24	29	43	Dakoda Armstrong (R)	Richard Petty Motorsports	Ford	294	0	running	20	$25,845
25	28	28	Mike Wallace	JGL Racing	Dodge	294	0	running	19	$26,295
26	10	19	Mike Bliss	TriStar Motorsports	Toyota	293	0	running	18	$25,720
27	35	14	Eric McClure	TriStar Motorsports	Toyota	290	0	running	17	$25,670
28	36	70	Derrike Cope	Derrike Cope Racing	Chevrolet	290	0	running	16	$19,595
29	38	52	Joey Gase	Jimmy Means Racing	Chevrolet	285	0	running	15	$25,545
30	23	40	Josh Wise (i)	The Motorsports Group	Chevrolet	270	0	running	0	$25,295
31	21	16	Ryan Reed (R)	Roush Fenway Racing	Ford	258	0	crash	13	$24,790
32	17	4	Jeffrey Earnhardt	JD Motorsports	Chevrolet	249	0	running	12	$24,655
33	39	24	Rubén García Jr.	SR² Motorsports	Toyota	214	0	crash	11	$24,540
34	33	74	Kevin Lepage	Mike Harmon Racing	Dodge	152	0	engine	10	$24,505
35	27	29	Kelly Admiraal	RAB Racing	Toyota	148	0	engine	9	$18,465
36	31	17	Tanner Berryhill (R)	Vision Racing	Dodge	144	0	engine	8	$23,025
37	40	13	Matt Carter (i)	MBM Motorsports	Toyota	18	0	brakes	0	$16,990
38	32	93	Carl Long	JGL Racing	Dodge	11	0	electrical	6	$16,931
39	16	46	Matt DiBenedetto	The Motorsports Group	Chevrolet	6	0	electrical	5	$16,830
40	24	10	Blake Koch	TriStar Motorsports	Toyota	5	0	vibration	4	$16,805
Failed to qualify
41		76	Willie Allen	Martins Motorsports	Dodge					
Official race results

== Standings after the race ==
Drivers' Championship standings

	Pos	Driver	Points
	1	Regan Smith	151
	2	Trevor Bayne	150 (-1)
1	3	Ty Dillon	143 (-8)
1	4	Chase Elliott	138 (–13)
2	5	Elliott Sadler	135 (–16)
1	6	Brendan Gaughan	131 (–20)
1	7	Brian Scott	127 (–24)
1	8	James Buescher	117 (–34)
1	9	Dylan Kwasniewski	116 (–35)
3	10	Landon Cassill	105 (–46)
Official driver's standings

- Note: Only the first 10 positions are included for the driver standings.

Previous race: 2014 Boyd Gaming 300	NASCAR Nationwide Series; 2014 season	Next race: 2014 TreatMyClot.com 300
