= 2013 ServiceMaster 200 =

32nd race of the 2013 NASCAR Nationwide Series

Race details
- Race 32 of 33 of the 2013 NASCAR Nationwide Series
- Date: November 9, 2013
- Official name: 15th Annual ServiceMaster 200
- Location: Avondale, Arizona, Phoenix International Raceway
- Course: Permanent racing facility
- Course length: 1 miles (1.6 km)
- Distance: 200 laps, 200 mi (321.868 km)
- Scheduled distance: 200 laps, 200 mi (321.868 km)
- Average speed: 101.166 miles per hour (162.811 km/h)

Pole position
Driver	Kyle Busch	Joe Gibbs Racing
- Time: 26.982

Most laps led
Driver	Kyle Busch	Joe Gibbs Racing
- Laps: 169

Winner
No. 54	Kyle Busch	Joe Gibbs Racing

Television in the United States
- Network: ESPN2
- Announcers: Allen Bestwick, Dale Jarrett, Andy Petree

Radio in the United States
- Radio: Motor Racing Network

The 2013 ServiceMaster 200 was the 32nd stock car race of the 2013 NASCAR Nationwide Series and the 15th iteration of the event. The race was held on Saturday, November 9, 2013, in Avondale, Arizona at Phoenix International Raceway, a 1-mile (1.6 km) permanent low-banked tri-oval race track. The race took the scheduled 200 laps to complete. At race's end, Kyle Busch, driving for Joe Gibbs Racing, would dominate the race to win his 63rd career NASCAR Nationwide Series win and his 12th and final win of the season. To fill out the podium, Justin Allgaier of Turner Scott Motorsports and Austin Dillon of Richard Childress Racing would finish second and third, respectively.

== Background ==
The layout of Phoenix International Raceway, the venue where the race was held.

Phoenix International Raceway – also known as PIR – is a one-mile, low-banked tri-oval race track located in Avondale, Arizona. It is named after the nearby metropolitan area of Phoenix. The motorsport track opened in 1964 and currently hosts two NASCAR race weekends annually. PIR has also hosted the IndyCar Series, CART, USAC and the Rolex Sports Car Series. The raceway is currently owned and operated by International Speedway Corporation.

The raceway was originally constructed with a 2.5 mi (4.0 km) road course that ran both inside and outside of the main tri-oval. In 1991 the track was reconfigured with the current 1.51 mi (2.43 km) interior layout. PIR has an estimated grandstand seating capacity of around 67,000. Lights were installed around the track in 2004 following the addition of a second annual NASCAR race weekend.

=== Entry list ===
- (R) denotes rookie driver.
- (i) denotes driver who is ineligible for series driver points.

#	Driver	Team	Make	Sponsor
00	Blake Koch	SR² Motorsports	Toyota	Frontline Wraps
01	Mike Wallace	JD Motorsports	Chevrolet	Verve! Partea
2	Brian Scott	Richard Childress Racing	Chevrolet	Whitetail Club
3	Austin Dillon	Richard Childress Racing	Chevrolet	AdvoCare
4	Daryl Harr	JD Motorsports	Chevrolet	iWorld
5	Brad Sweet	JR Motorsports	Chevrolet	Great Clips
6	Trevor Bayne	Roush Fenway Racing	Ford	World Financial Group
7	Regan Smith	JR Motorsports	Chevrolet	TaxSlayer
10	Jeff Green	TriStar Motorsports	Toyota	TriStar Motorsports
11	Elliott Sadler	Joe Gibbs Racing	Toyota	OneMain Financial
12	Sam Hornish Jr.	Penske Racing	Ford	Alliance Truck Parts
14	Eric McClure	TriStar Motorsports	Toyota	Hefty Ultimate with Arm & Hammer
16	Ryan Reed	Roush Fenway Racing	Ford	Lilly Diabetes
18	Matt Kenseth (i)	Joe Gibbs Racing	Toyota	GameStop, Batman: Arkham Origins
19	Mike Bliss	TriStar Motorsports	Toyota	Tweaker Energy Shot
20	Drew Herring	Joe Gibbs Racing	Toyota	Dollar General
22	Brad Keselowski (i)	Penske Racing	Ford	Discount Tire
23	Timmy Hill (i)	Rick Ware Racing	Chevrolet	Pocket Finder
24	Kelly Admiraal	SR² Motorsports	Toyota	Swan Rentals, Frontline Wraps
30	Nelson Piquet Jr. (R)	Turner Scott Motorsports	Chevrolet	Qualcomm
31	Justin Allgaier	Turner Scott Motorsports	Chevrolet	Brandt Professional Agriculture
32	Kyle Larson (R)	Turner Scott Motorsports	Chevrolet	Target
33	Kevin Harvick (i)	Richard Childress Racing	Chevrolet	Bad Boy Buggies
40	T. J. Bell	The Motorsports Group	Chevrolet	The Motorsports Group
42	Josh Wise	The Motorsports Group	Chevrolet	The Motorsports Group
43	Michael Annett	Richard Petty Motorsports	Ford	Pilot Travel Centers
44	Chad Hackenbracht (i)	TriStar Motorsports	Toyota	Tastee Chocolate Apples
48	Ryan Blaney (i)	Penske Racing	Ford	AutoZone
51	Jeremy Clements	Jeremy Clements Racing	Chevrolet	RepairableVehicles.com, USS James E. Williams (DDG-95)
52	Joey Gase	Jimmy Means Racing	Toyota	Better Business Bureau, Donate Life
54	Kyle Busch (i)	Joe Gibbs Racing	Toyota	Monster Energy
55	Jamie Dick	Viva Motorsports	Chevrolet	Viva Motorsports
60	Travis Pastrana	Roush Fenway Racing	Ford	Roush Fenway Racing
70	Derrike Cope	ML Motorsports	Chevrolet	ML Motorsports
74	Carl Long	Mike Harmon Racing	Dodge	Mike Harmon Racing
77	Parker Kligerman	Kyle Busch Motorsports	Toyota	Toyota
79	Jeffrey Earnhardt (R)	Go Green Racing	Ford	SK Hand Tools
87	Joe Nemechek	NEMCO Motorsports	Toyota	Wood Pellet Grills
89	Morgan Shepherd	Shepherd Racing Ventures	Chevrolet	Racing with Jesus "Advertise Here"
92	Dexter Stacey (R)	KH Motorsports	Ford	Eneos
98	Kevin Swindell (R)	Biagi-DenBeste Racing	Ford	Carroll Shelby Engine Co., DenBeste Heavy Equipment
99	Alex Bowman (R)	RAB Racing	Toyota	Fuelxx
Official entry list

== Practice ==
=== First practice ===
The first practice session was held on Friday, November 8, at 10:00 AM MST, and would last for an hour and 30 minutes. Brian Scott of Richard Childress Racing would set the fastest time in the session, with a lap of 26.949 and an average speed of 133.586 miles per hour (214.986 km/h).

Pos.	#	Driver	Team	Make	Time	Speed
1	2	Brian Scott	Richard Childress Racing	Chevrolet	26.949	133.586
2	3	Austin Dillon	Richard Childress Racing	Chevrolet	27.009	133.289
3	7	Regan Smith	JR Motorsports	Chevrolet	27.153	132.582
Full first practice results

=== Second and final practice ===
The second and final practice session, sometimes referred to as Happy Hour, was held on Friday, November 8, at 1:35 PM MST, and would last for 45 minutes. Justin Allgaier of Turner Scott Motorsports would set the fastest time in the session, with a lap of 27.103 and an average speed of 132.827 miles per hour (213.764 km/h).

Pos.	#	Driver	Team	Make	Time	Speed
1	31	Justin Allgaier	Turner Scott Motorsports	Chevrolet	27.103	132.827
2	33	Kevin Harvick (i)	Richard Childress Racing	Chevrolet	27.141	132.641
3	3	Austin Dillon	Richard Childress Racing	Chevrolet	27.302	131.858
Full Happy Hour practice results

== Qualifying ==
Qualifying was held on Saturday, November 9, at 10:35 AM MST. Each driver would have two laps to set a fastest time; the fastest of the two would count as their official qualifying lap.

Kyle Busch of Joe Gibbs Racing would win the pole, setting a time of 26.982 and an average speed of 133.422 miles per hour (214.722 km/h).

Two drivers would fail to qualify: Morgan Shepherd and Dexter Stacey.

=== Full qualifying results ===
Pos.	#	Driver	Team	Make	Time	Speed
1	54	Kyle Busch (i)	Joe Gibbs Racing	Toyota	26.982	133.422
2	3	Austin Dillon	Richard Childress Racing	Chevrolet	26.987	133.398
3	33	Kevin Harvick (i)	Richard Childress Racing	Chevrolet	27.011	133.279
4	22	Brad Keselowski (i)	Penske Racing	Ford	27.016	133.254
5	2	Brian Scott	Richard Childress Racing	Chevrolet	27.054	133.067
6	12	Sam Hornish Jr.	Penske Racing	Ford	27.079	132.944
7	18	Matt Kenseth (i)	Joe Gibbs Racing	Toyota	27.099	132.846
8	77	Parker Kligerman	Kyle Busch Motorsports	Toyota	27.141	132.641
9	48	Ryan Blaney (i)	Penske Racing	Ford	27.170	132.499
10	20	Drew Herring	Joe Gibbs Racing	Toyota	27.226	132.227
11	7	Regan Smith	JR Motorsports	Chevrolet	27.250	132.110
12	31	Justin Allgaier	Turner Scott Motorsports	Chevrolet	27.272	132.004
13	32	Kyle Larson (R)	Turner Scott Motorsports	Chevrolet	27.289	131.921
14	6	Trevor Bayne	Roush Fenway Racing	Ford	27.316	131.791
15	99	Alex Bowman (R)	RAB Racing	Toyota	27.327	131.738
16	11	Elliott Sadler	Joe Gibbs Racing	Toyota	27.349	131.632
17	19	Mike Bliss	TriStar Motorsports	Toyota	27.372	131.521
18	16	Ryan Reed	Roush Fenway Racing	Ford	27.421	131.286
19	60	Travis Pastrana	Roush Fenway Racing	Ford	27.444	131.176
20	98	Kevin Swindell (R)	Biagi-DenBeste Racing	Ford	27.470	131.052
21	30	Nelson Piquet Jr. (R)	Turner Scott Motorsports	Chevrolet	27.526	130.785
22	79	Jeffrey Earnhardt (R)	Go Green Racing	Ford	27.572	130.567
23	44	Chad Hackenbracht (i)	TriStar Motorsports	Toyota	27.683	130.044
24	74	Carl Long	Mike Harmon Racing	Dodge	27.713	129.903
25	42	Josh Wise	The Motorsports Group	Chevrolet	27.730	129.823
26	5	Brad Sweet	JR Motorsports	Chevrolet	27.737	129.791
27	43	Michael Annett	Richard Petty Motorsports	Ford	27.781	129.585
28	14	Eric McClure	TriStar Motorsports	Toyota	27.793	129.529
29	52	Joey Gase	Jimmy Means Racing	Chevrolet	27.795	129.520
30	55	Jamie Dick	Viva Motorsports	Chevrolet	27.833	129.343
31	10	Jeff Green	TriStar Motorsports	Toyota	27.872	129.162
32	23	Timmy Hill (i)	Rick Ware Racing	Chevrolet	27.970	128.709
33	87	Joe Nemechek	NEMCO Motorsports	Toyota	27.984	128.645
34	01	Mike Wallace	JD Motorsports	Chevrolet	27.985	128.640
35	24	Kelly Admiraal	SR² Motorsports	Toyota	28.047	128.356
36	40	T. J. Bell	The Motorsports Group	Chevrolet	28.373	126.881
37	51	Jeremy Clements	Jeremy Clements Racing	Chevrolet	28.412	126.707
Qualified by owner's points
38	4	Daryl Harr	JD Motorsports	Chevrolet	28.505	126.294
39	70	Derrike Cope	ML Motorsports	Chevrolet	—	—
Last car to qualify on time
40	00	Blake Koch	SR² Motorsports	Toyota	27.972	128.700
Failed to qualify
41	89	Morgan Shepherd	Shepherd Racing Ventures	Chevrolet	28.196	127.678
42	92	Dexter Stacey (R)	KH Motorsports	Ford	28.650	125.654
Official starting lineup

== Race results ==
Fin	St	#	Driver	Team	Make	Laps	Led	Status	Pts	Winnings
1	1	54	Kyle Busch (i)	Joe Gibbs Racing	Toyota	200	169	running	0	$58,100
2	12	31	Justin Allgaier	Turner Scott Motorsports	Chevrolet	200	17	running	43	$44,875
3	2	3	Austin Dillon	Richard Childress Racing	Chevrolet	200	0	running	41	$37,875
4	11	7	Regan Smith	JR Motorsports	Chevrolet	200	0	running	40	$32,500
5	6	12	Sam Hornish Jr.	Penske Racing	Ford	200	0	running	39	$30,100
6	7	18	Matt Kenseth (i)	Joe Gibbs Racing	Toyota	200	0	running	0	$22,700
7	14	6	Trevor Bayne	Roush Fenway Racing	Ford	200	6	running	38	$26,700
8	16	11	Elliott Sadler	Joe Gibbs Racing	Toyota	200	0	running	36	$26,625
9	3	33	Kevin Harvick (i)	Richard Childress Racing	Chevrolet	200	0	running	0	$20,260
10	9	48	Ryan Blaney (i)	Penske Racing	Ford	200	0	running	0	$19,700
11	15	99	Alex Bowman (R)	RAB Racing	Toyota	200	0	running	33	$25,700
12	8	77	Parker Kligerman	Kyle Busch Motorsports	Toyota	200	0	running	32	$24,875
13	5	2	Brian Scott	Richard Childress Racing	Chevrolet	200	0	running	31	$24,875
14	27	43	Michael Annett	Richard Petty Motorsports	Ford	200	0	running	30	$24,265
15	18	16	Ryan Reed	Roush Fenway Racing	Ford	200	0	running	29	$25,305
16	10	20	Drew Herring	Joe Gibbs Racing	Toyota	200	0	running	28	$24,020
17	17	19	Mike Bliss	TriStar Motorsports	Toyota	200	0	running	27	$23,810
18	21	30	Nelson Piquet Jr. (R)	Turner Scott Motorsports	Chevrolet	200	0	running	26	$23,650
19	4	22	Brad Keselowski (i)	Penske Racing	Ford	199	8	running	0	$18,290
20	22	79	Jeffrey Earnhardt (R)	Go Green Racing	Ford	198	0	running	24	$24,105
21	19	60	Travis Pastrana	Roush Fenway Racing	Ford	198	0	running	23	$23,320
22	30	55	Jamie Dick	Viva Motorsports	Chevrolet	197	0	running	22	$23,210
23	32	23	Timmy Hill (i)	Rick Ware Racing	Chevrolet	197	0	running	0	$23,075
24	23	44	Chad Hackenbracht (i)	TriStar Motorsports	Toyota	196	0	running	0	$22,965
25	34	01	Mike Wallace	JD Motorsports	Chevrolet	196	0	running	19	$23,380
26	37	51	Jeremy Clements	Jeremy Clements Racing	Chevrolet	196	0	running	18	$22,870
27	28	14	Eric McClure	TriStar Motorsports	Toyota	194	0	running	17	$22,835
28	26	5	Brad Sweet	JR Motorsports	Chevrolet	192	0	running	16	$22,765
29	29	52	Joey Gase	Jimmy Means Racing	Chevrolet	189	0	running	15	$16,690
30	33	87	Joe Nemechek	NEMCO Motorsports	Toyota	171	0	engine	14	$22,955
31	35	24	Kelly Admiraal	SR² Motorsports	Toyota	162	0	running	13	$22,600
32	13	32	Kyle Larson (R)	Turner Scott Motorsports	Chevrolet	156	0	crash	12	$22,565
33	38	4	Daryl Harr	JD Motorsports	Chevrolet	150	0	running	11	$22,525
34	20	98	Kevin Swindell (R)	Biagi-DenBeste Racing	Ford	148	0	crash	10	$22,489
35	39	70	Derrike Cope	ML Motorsports	Chevrolet	104	0	handling	9	$22,455
36	24	74	Carl Long	Mike Harmon Racing	Dodge	63	0	brakes	8	$21,195
37	36	40	T. J. Bell	The Motorsports Group	Chevrolet	13	0	brakes	7	$15,150
38	40	00	Blake Koch	SR² Motorsports	Toyota	9	0	transmission	6	$15,115
39	25	42	Josh Wise	The Motorsports Group	Chevrolet	6	0	electrical	5	$14,865
40	31	10	Jeff Green	TriStar Motorsports	Toyota	4	0	vibration	4	$14,830
Failed to qualify
41		89	Morgan Shepherd	Shepherd Racing Ventures	Chevrolet					
42		92	Dexter Stacey (R)	KH Motorsports	Ford					
Official race results

== Standings after the race ==
Drivers' Championship standings

Pos	Driver	Points
1	Austin Dillon	1,148
2	Sam Hornish Jr.	1,140 (-8)
3	Regan Smith	1,093 (-55)
4	Justin Allgaier	1,065 (–93)
5	Elliott Sadler	1,062 (–96)
6	Trevor Bayne	1,047 (–101)
7	Brian Scott	1,041 (–107)
8	Brian Vickers	970 (–178)
9	Kyle Larson	957 (–191)
10	Parker Kligerman	956 (–192)
Official driver's standings

- Note: Only the first 10 positions are included for the driver standings.

Previous race: 2013 O'Reilly Auto Parts Challenge	NASCAR Nationwide Series; 2013 season	Next race: 2013 Ford EcoBoost 300
