= Reser's Fine Foods =

Corporation in Beaverton, Oregon, US

Reser's Fine Foods, Inc.
- Type: Private
- Industry: Food processing
- Founded: 1950
- Headquarters: Beaverton, Oregon
- Key people: Al Reser, former president and CEO. Mark Reser, current president and CEO.
- Products: Prepared foods
- Revenue: $1.2 billion (2017)
- Number of employees: Approx. 4,000 (2020)
- Website: www.resers.com

Reser's Fine Foods, Inc., an American corporation based in Beaverton, Oregon, manufactures and distributes fresh and refrigerated prepared foods. Over 1,000 products are available in the 50 U.S. states, Canada, Guam, Mexico, and areas of the Far East. Its prepared foods are sold in national grocery chains, independent outlets, and convenience stores. Oregon State University's football stadium, Reser Stadium, is named after the company, which is one of its sponsors. The company recalled 19 salad products distributed in 29 states in 2016 for possible listeria contamination. Reser's consistently ranks in the top ten privately held Oregon companies by annual revenue.

== History ==
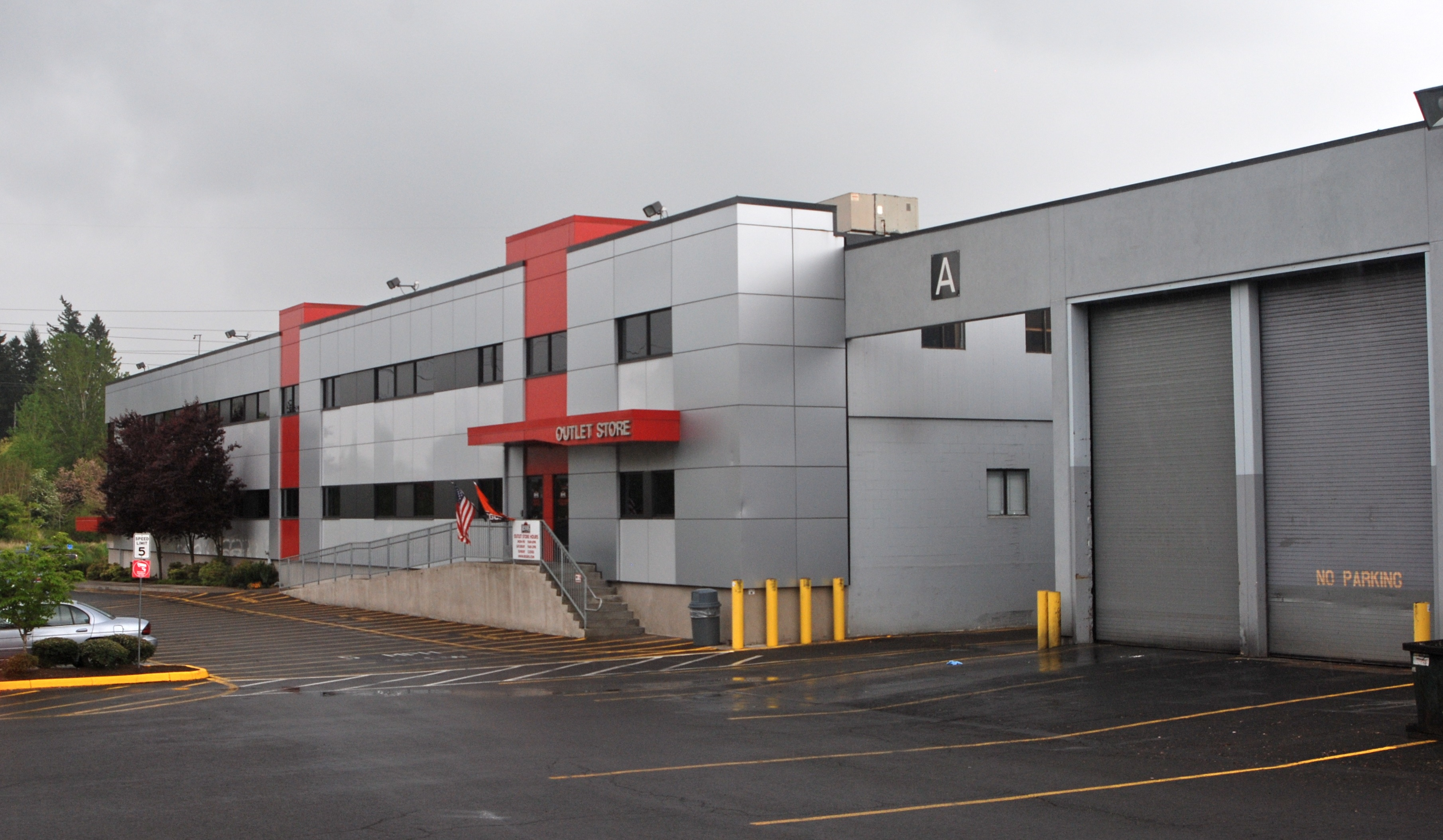
The headquarters of Reser's in Beaverton, Oregon, in 2015

Reser's grew from the potato salad business started by Mildred and Earl Reser in their kitchen in 1950, based in Cornelius, Oregon. Initially selling potato salad to local butcher shops and mom-and-pop stores, the Resers landed a contract to supply Safeway stores in Oregon in 1951.

Shortly after incorporating on May 14, 1959, Reser's moved from Cornelius to a 33,000-square-foot (3,100 m^{2}) facility in Beaverton, Oregon. Rapid growth over the next 30 years brought Reser's to its present-day operations at 12 plants with over 2800 employees. In 2011, the company purchased Oklahoma-based competitor Vaughan Foods for $18.3 million, and the assets of Orval Kent for $69.2 million.

In 2010, annual revenue was approximately $700 million, ranking Reser's as the sixth-largest private company in Oregon by revenue.

As of 2014, the company had almost 4,800 employees and was operating 16 facilities, in the United States and Mexico. In July 2014, it announced plans to build a 310,000-square-foot (29,000 m^{2}) facility in Hillsboro, Oregon, but indicated that its headquarters would remain at the site in Beaverton. In July 2015, the new Hillsboro plant, located on Century Blvd., was about three-fourths completed and was projected to begin being used for production in October 2015.

By 2017, annual revenue had grown to $1.2 billion, ranking Reser's fifth highest annual revenue for private companies. This ranked Reser's highest in revenue for a non-public Oregon food producer, ranking one spot higher than Tillamook County Creamery Association.

Reser’s is also a primary sponsor of Christopher Bell and the #20 Toyota Camry in the NASCAR Cup Series.

== Relationship with Oregon State University ==
In addition to the sponsorship naming rights of Reser Stadium, the company helped fund other projects on campus such as the Linus Pauling Science Center.
