= Pull-A-Part =

American automotive recycling yard chain

Pull-A-Part, LLC is a United States chain of automotive recycling yards where customers bring their own tools and remove parts out of used vehicles. As of July 2017 there are 24 locations in 12 states.

== History ==
Founded in 1997 in Atlanta, Georgia, Pull-A-Part is the nation’s fastest growing self-service used auto parts retailer, and recycler in the United States.

Beginning as a scrap metal recycling program, Pull-A-Part opened its first vehicle salvage and recycling yard in Atlanta, Georgia, in 1998. The company has expanded since, and in 2013 purchased Corpus Christi, Texas-based U-Pull-It Auto Parts Inc. as its 25th location.

== Recycling Program ==
Pull-A-Part works closely with environmental management programs to provide an environmentally responsible way to manage scrap vehicles. On January 28, 2008, Pull-A-Part was recognized by the Environmental Protection Agency (EPA), for its participation in the EPA’s National Partnership for Environmental Priorities.

Pull-A-Part was the first facility to achieve the Indiana Clean Yard - Gold Level Award from the Indiana Department of Environmental Management (IDEM) on October 15, 2009. The Indiana Clean Yard program was established in 2009 in collaboration with the Automotive Recyclers of Indiana Inc. (ARI) to decrease environmental threats posed by vehicles stockpiled in salvage yards. Pull-A-Part also earned the Indiana Clean Yard - Gold Level Award in 2011, 2013, and 2015. Some of the steps that are taken to reduce environmental threats include:

1. Each vehicle is thoroughly drained of all fluids and refrigerant from air conditioning systems, which are either shipped for recycling or sold for reuse (such as engine coolant).
2. Mercury switches, which each have the potential to contaminate 132,000 gallons of drinking water, are removed and shipped for recycling through the EPA's National Vehicle Mercury Switch Removal Program (NVMSRP).
3. Lead-acid batteries are removed and tested. Good batteries are resold for reuse, and unserviceable batteries are palletized, shrink wrapped and shipped offsite, where the lead and plastic are recycled and the acid can be recovered.
4. Catalytic converters are removed and shipped offsite for recovery of their precious metals content and the stainless steel shells.

Pull-A-Part serves as one of the top-5 recyclers of mercury switches in the United States and in 2008 Pull-A-Part hosted the US Administrator of the Environmental Protection Agency, Stephen L. Johnson, who removed the one millionth switch as part of NVMSRP. Paired with Pull-A-Part's used parts retail sector, these methods ultimately reduce the amount of waste from scrapped vehicles by 21 percent when compared to typical vehicle shredding practices.

== Locations ==
Arizona

- Tucson

Alabama

- Birmingham
- Montgomery

Georgia

- Augusta
- Conley
- Lithonia
- Norcross

Indiana

- Indianapolis

Kentucky

- Louisville

Louisiana

- Baton Rouge
- Lafayette
- New Orleans

Mississippi

- Jackson

North Carolina

- Charlotte
- Winston-Salem

Ohio

- Akron
- Canton
- Cleveland

South Carolina

- Columbia

Tennessee

- Knoxville
- Memphis
- Nashville

Texas

- Corpus Christi
- El Paso
