= Dylan Kwasniewski =

American racing driver (born 1995)

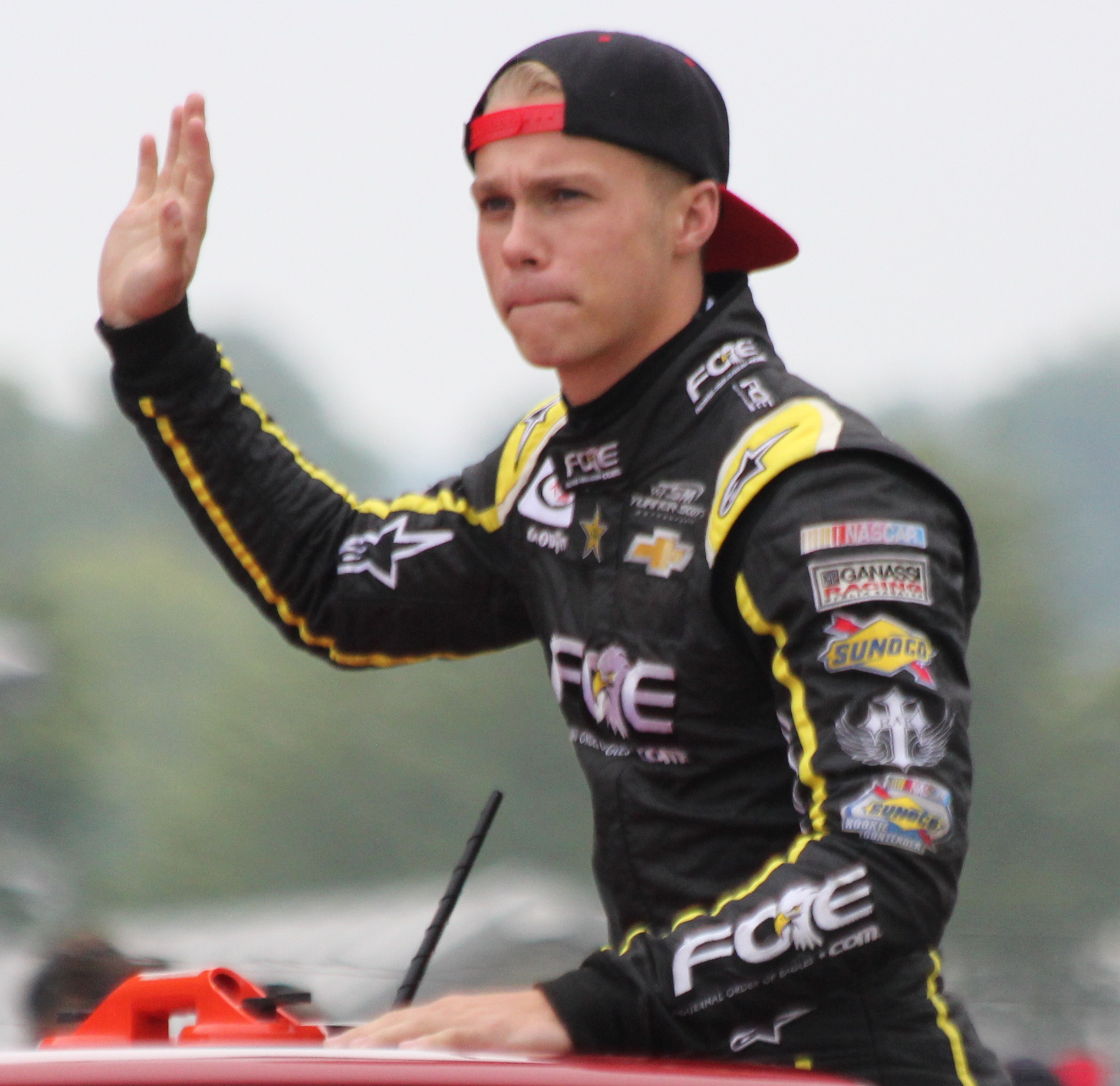
- Kwasniewski at Road America in 2015
- Born: May 31, 1995 (age 31); Norwalk, Connecticut, U.S.
- Achievements: Only driver to ever win both NASCAR K&N Pro Series East and NASCAR K&N Pro Series West Championships; 2012 NASCAR K&N Pro Series West Champion; 2013 NASCAR K&N Pro Series East Champion
- Awards: 2011 NASCAR K&N Pro Series West Rookie of the Year

NASCAR O'Reilly Auto Parts Series career
- 39 races run over 2 years
- 2015 position: 42nd
- Best finish: 11th (2014)
- First race: 2014 DRIVE4COPD 300 (Daytona)
- Last race: 2015 DAV 200 (Phoenix)
Wins	Top tens	Poles
0	3	1
- Statistics up to date as of November 14, 2015.

Dylan Kwasniewski (/kwəzˈnɛski/ kwəz-NES-kee; born May 31, 1995) is an American real estate broker, businessman, entrepreneur, and former professional stock car racing driver. He last competed part-time in the NASCAR Xfinity Series, driving the No. 97 Chevrolet Camaro for Obaika Racing. Kwasniewski is the only driver in history to score both the ARCA Menards Series East and ARCA Menards Series West championships, he was also a developmental driver for Chip Ganassi Racing. In 2020, he co-founded 6 Summit Capital. Before that, he was Vice President of Colliers International, starting in 2017, where he garnered $105 million in deal volume in only three years.

== Racing career ==
Born in Norwalk, Connecticut as the oldest of four children, Kwasniewski started his career driving go-karts at the age of four. He later raced in Bandoleros and Legends cars before joining the American Speed Association Super Truck Series in 2009. The same year, Rockstar Energy Drink, based in Kwasniewski's hometown of Las Vegas, Nevada, signed on as his sponsor. In 2010, Kwasniewski raced a late model car in the Lucas Oil / Rockstar Modified Series and made the move to NASCAR the following year.

=== Touring series ===
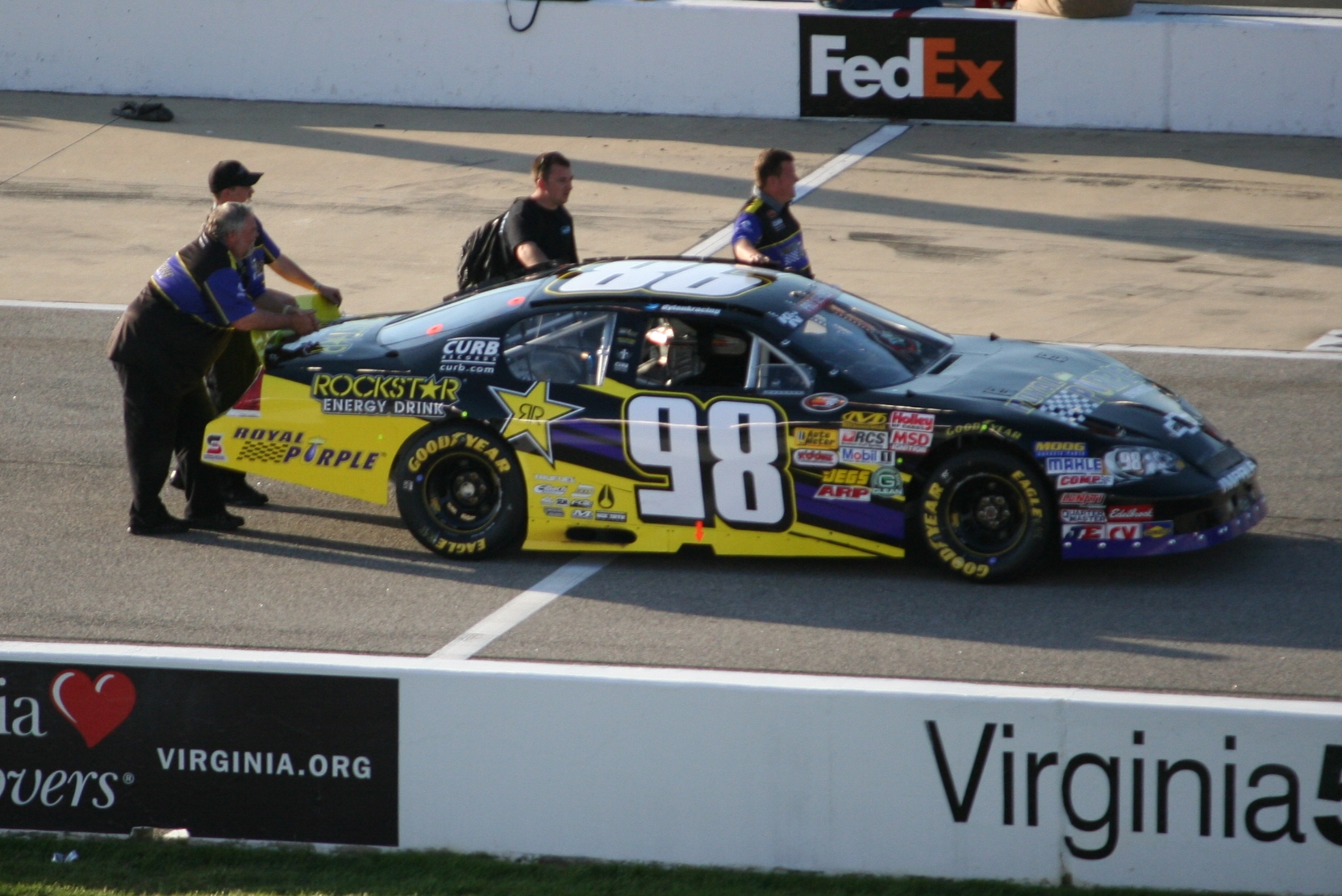
Kwasniewski's No. 98 on pit road prior to the K&N Series East race at Richmond International Raceway

In 2011, Kwasniewski entered the K&N Pro Series West, driving for Gene Price Motorsports in the No. 03 Chevrolet, and finished second in his debut at All American Speedway. At Colorado National Speedway, Kwasniewski won the pole position and the race, becoming the youngest driver to win a series pole and race. (Note: The current youngest K&N Pro Series winner is Gray Gaulding, winning at Phoenix International Raceway.) He won again during the season at Montana Raceway Park, and ended the season fifth in the points standings, along with nine top-tens. Kwasniewski was subsequently named Rookie of the Year. In 2012, Kwasniewski won three times at Stockton 99 Raceway, Iowa Speedway and All American Speedway, along with recording 15 top-tens. Entering the season finale at Las Vegas Motor Speedway, Kwasniewski led teammate and 2011 series champion Greg Pursley by two points, and with a second-place finish, beat Pursley for the title by six points. At 17 years, 5 months and 10 days, Kwasniewski became the youngest champion in series history, surpassing Chuck Bown's record set in 1976 at 22 years, 7 months and 11 days.

In 2012, Kwasniewski announced talks with Joe Gibbs Racing to field a car in the K&N Pro Series East for the 2013 season, but eventually joined Turner Scott Motorsports (TSM), driving the No. 98. On January 7, 2013, Kwasniewski was named to the NASCAR Next program, which documents the potential future stars in NASCAR. In his first East race at Bristol Motor Speedway, Kwasniewski led 96 of 125 laps en route to the win. Kwasniewski added to his win with victories at Iowa, Langley Speedway, Virginia International Raceway and Greenville-Pickens Speedway. At the season-ending Road Atlanta race, Kwasniewski held the points lead over Brett Moffitt by five points, but transmission problems eliminated Moffitt from championship contention, as Kwasniewski led every lap to win the East championship, becoming the first driver to win both East and West titles. During the year, Kwasniewski also ran an ARCA Racing Series race at Kansas Speedway, winning the pole and finishing fourth.

=== Xfinity Series ===
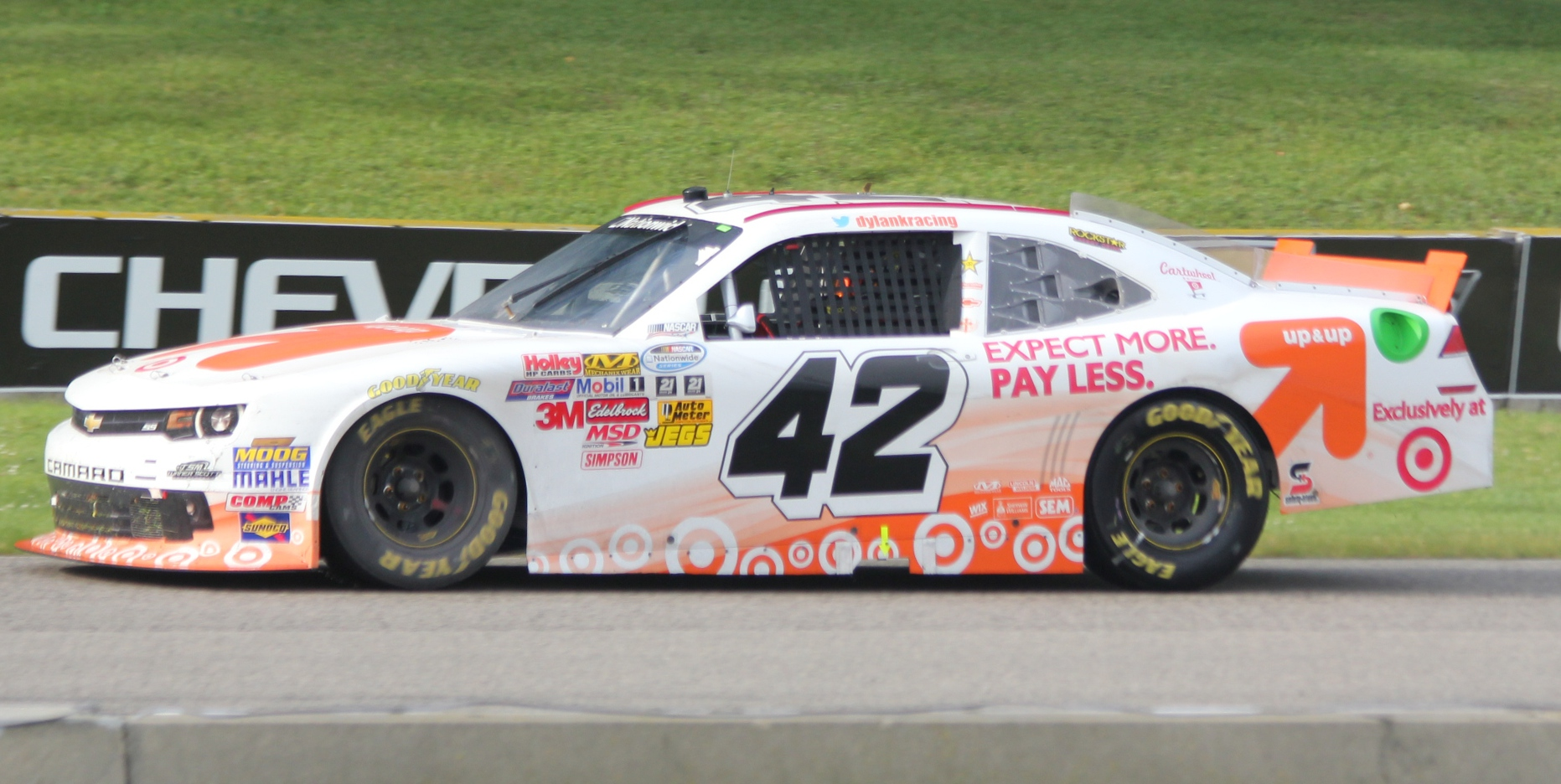
Kwasniewski racing in the No. 42 at Road America in 2014

On February 3, 2014, TSM announced that Kwasniewski would enter the Nationwide Series for the 2014 season, driving the team's No. 31 Rockstar Chevrolet. In a press release regarding the news, Kwasniewski stated:

"I'm thankful for Harry Scott and Steve Turner for giving me this opportunity, as well as Rockstar for moving up with us. Racing in the Nationwide Series is going to present a lot of challenges and it won't be easy, but I look forward to taking it all on, learning from the other competitors and hopefully winning some races."

Kwasniewski was the fastest driver during the second day of Nationwide testing at Daytona International Speedway, and later entered the ARCA Racing Series' Lucas Oil 200 with TSM, winning the pole position. He finished 14th in the race. On February 21, Kwasniewski clinched the pole for the Nationwide season-opening DRIVE4COPD 300, becoming the eleventh driver in series history to win the pole in his first series start, and the youngest Nationwide pole-sitter at Daytona.

In March 2014, Kwasniewski signed with Chip Ganassi Racing's driver development program. On May 12, Turner Scott Motorsports announced that Kwasniewski would run standalone Nationwide Series events in the team's No. 42, in which Kyle Larson was unavailable. Kwasniewski ran the No. 42 with Rockstar at Iowa in August. Kwasniewski ended 2014 with three top-tens and an 11th-place points finish.

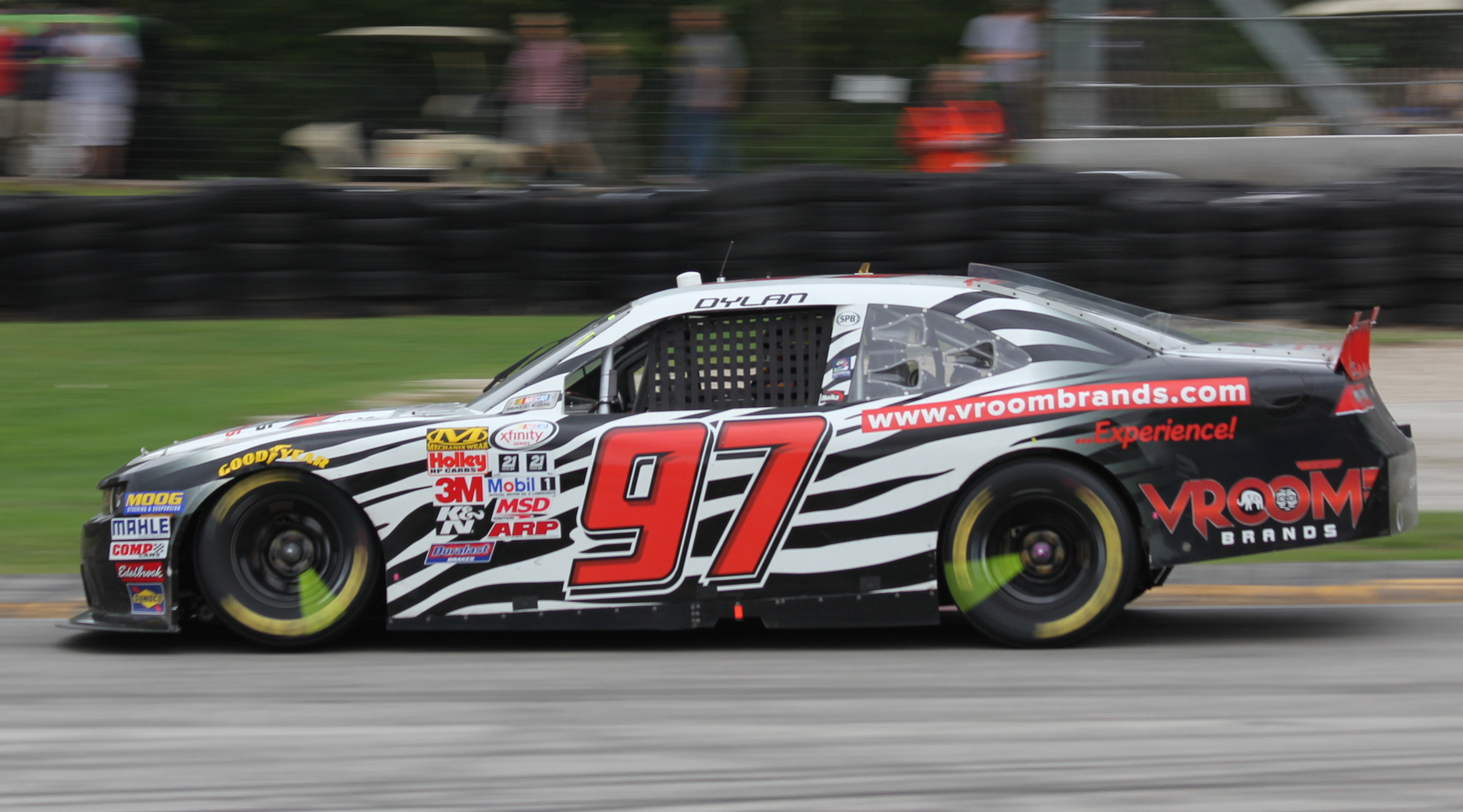
Kwasniewski's No. 97 car at Road America in 2015.

Kwasniewski was scheduled to return to the team, which was renamed HScott Motorsports, for 2015 on a part-time basis in the No. 42. However, he and Rockstar failed to reach an agreement to continue sponsoring the car, and with Brennan Poole joining the team, his future became uncertain. As a result, Kwasniewski stated plans to raise sponsorship money to fund a car for the 2016 season. Kwasniewski was picked up by Obaika Racing to make his debut in 2015 at Mid-Ohio, eventually driving in a total of six races for the team.

== Personal life ==
Kwasniewski is a graduate of Faith Lutheran Middle School & High School. His late father, Randy, was the former CEO of the Hard Rock Hotel and Casino.

== Motorsports career results ==
=== Career summary ===
Season	Series	Team	Races	Wins	Top 5s	Top 10s	Poles	Points	Position
2011	K&N Pro Series West	Gene Price Motorsports	13	2	8	9	2	1856	5th
2012	K&N Pro Series West	Gene Price Motorsports	15	3	12	15	5	622	**1st**
2012	K&N Pro Series East	Steve DeSouza	3	0	1	2	0	103	31st
2013	K&N Pro Series East	Turner Scott Motorsports	14	6	8	10	3	536	**1st**
2013	ARCA Racing Series	Venturini Motorsports	1	0	1	1	1	480	56th
2014	NASCAR Nationwide Series	Turner Scott Motorsports	33	0	0	3	1	867	11th
2014	ARCA Racing Series	Turner Scott Motorsports	1	0	0	0	1	180	88th
2015	NASCAR Xfinity Series	Obaika Racing	6	0	0	0	0	89	42nd

=== NASCAR ===
(key) (Bold – Pole position awarded by qualifying time. Italics – Pole position earned by points standings or practice time. * – Most laps led.)

==== Xfinity Series ====
NASCAR Xfinity Series results
Year	Team	No.	Make	1	2	3	4	5	6	7	8	9	10	11	12	13	14	15	16	17	18	19	20	21	22	23	24	25	26	27	28	29	30	31	32	33	NXSC	Pts	Ref
2014	Turner Scott Motorsports	31	Chevy	**DAY**; 8	PHO; 13	LVS; 24	BRI; 15	CAL; 11	TEX; 14	DAR; 23	RCH; 32	TAL; 35		CLT; 13	DOV; 26	MCH; 31		KEN; 11	DAY; 24	NHA; 13	CHI; 17	IND; 14		GLN; 27		BRI; 25	ATL; 21	RCH; 11	CHI; 17		DOV; 21	KAN; 11	CLT; 14	TEX; 14	PHO; 15	HOM; 19	11th	867	
2014	Turner Scott Motorsports	42	Chevy										IOW; 11				ROA; 26						IOW; 9		MOH; 8					KEN; 12							11th	867	
2015	Obaika Racing	97	Chevy	DAY	ATL	LVS	PHO	CAL	TEX	BRI	RCH	TAL	IOW	CLT	DOV	MCH	CHI	DAY	KEN	NHA	IND	IOW	GLN	MOH; 34	BRI; 32	ROA; 33	DAR	RCH; 25	CHI	KEN; 17	DOV	CLT	KAN	TEX	PHO; 34	HOM	42nd	89	

==== K&N Pro Series East ====
NASCAR K&N Pro Series East results
Year	Team	No.	Make	1	2	3	4	5	6	7	8	9	10	11	12	13	14	NKNPSEC	Pts	Ref
2012	Steve DeSouza	20	Toyota	BRI	GRE; 7	RCH	IOW	BGS	JFC; 18	LGY	CNB	COL	IOW	NHA; 4	DOV	GRE	CAR	31st	103	
2013	Turner Scott Motorsports	98	Chevy	BRI; 1*	GRE; 15	FIF; 7	RCH; 13	BGS; 2	IOW; 1	LGY; 1*	**COL**; 3	IOW; 9	**VIR**; 1*	**GRE**; 1	NHA; 24	DOV; 29	**RAL**; 1*	1st	536	

==== K&N Pro Series West ====
NASCAR K&N Pro Series West results
Year	Team	No.	Make	1	2	3	4	5	6	7	8	9	10	11	12	13	14	15	NKNPSWC	Pts	Ref
2011	Gene Price Motorsports	03	Chevy	PHO	AAS; 4	MMP; 25		LVS; 2									PHO; 33		5th	1856	
2011	Gene Price Motorsports	3	Ford				IOW; 4												5th	1856	
2011	Gene Price Motorsports	03	Ford						SON; 26	IRW; 3	EVG; 2*	PIR; 29	**CNS**; 1*	MRP; 1*	**SPO**; 2*	AAS; 9*			5th	1856	
2012	Gene Price Motorsports	03	Ford	PHO; 2	LHC; 3	MMP; 4	**S99**; 1*	IOW; 1	BIR; 2*	LVS; 2	SON; 5	EVG; 7	**CNS**; 5	IOW; 9	PIR; 4	**SMP**; 9*	**AAS**; 1	PHO; 2	1st	622	

^{*} Season still in progress
^{1} Ineligible for series points

=== ARCA Racing Series ===
(key) (Bold – Pole position awarded by qualifying time. Italics – Pole position earned by points standings or practice time. * – Most laps led.)

ARCA Racing Series results
Year	Team	No.	Make	1	2	3	4	5	6	7	8	9	10	11	12	13	14	15	16	17	18	19	20	21	ARSC	Pts	Ref
2013	Venturini Motorsports	55	Toyota	DAY	MOB	SLM	TAL	TOL	ELK	POC	MCH	ROA	WIN	CHI	NJE	POC	BLN	ISF	MAD	DSF	IOW	SLM	KEN	KAN; 4	56th	480	
2014	Turner Scott Motorsports	4	Chevy	DAY; 14	MOB	SLM	TAL	TOL	NJE	POC	MCH	ELK	WIN	CHI	IRP	POC	BLN	ISF	MAD	DSF	SLM	KEN	KAN		88th	180	

Sporting positions
Preceded by Greg Pursley	NASCAR K&N Pro Series West Champion; 2012	Succeeded by Derek Thorn
Preceded by Kyle Larson	NASCAR K&N Pro Series East Champion; 2013	Succeeded by Ben Rhodes
