= OneMain Financial =

American financial services company

OneMain Holdings, Inc.
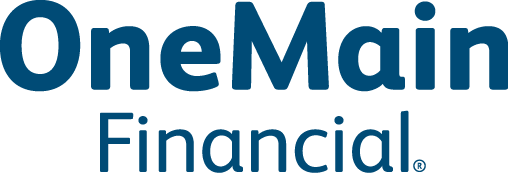
- Company type: Public
- Traded as: NYSE: OMF; Russell 1000 component
- Industry: Financial services
- Predecessor: Springleaf Financial; CitiFinancial; American General Finance
- Founded: 1912; 114 years ago in Baltimore, Maryland, U.S.
- Founder: Alexander E. Duncan
- Headquarters: Evansville, Indiana, United States
- Area served: United States
- Key people: Douglas H. Shulman; (chairman, president & CEO); Jeanette Osterhout; (CFO); Micah R. Conrad; (COO)
- Products: Personal loans; Insurance
- Revenue: ▲US$5.69 billion (2024)
- Net income: ▼US$509 million (2024)
- Total assets: ▲US$25.9 billion (2024)
- Total equity: ▲US$3.19 billion (2024)
- Number of employees: 9,000 (2024)
- Subsidiaries: OneMain Finance Corporation
- Website: onemainfinancial.com

OneMain Holdings, Inc. is an American financial services holding company headquartered in Evansville, Indiana, with central offices throughout the United States. The company wholly owns OneMain Finance Corporation and its subsidiaries, through which it operates in the consumer finance and insurance industries as OneMain Financial. Its business primarily focuses on providing personal loans and optional insurance products to customers with limited access to traditional lenders, such as banks and credit card companies.

OneMain's roots stretch back to 1912 when it was founded by Alexander E. Duncan as Commercial Credit Company in Baltimore, Maryland. Through a series of mergers and acquisitions, Commercial Credit Company eventually became a subsidiary of Citigroup and was known as CitiFinancial. After the 2008 financial crisis, Citigroup reorganized its business, with the company regarding CitiFinancial as a noncore business that it renamed to OneMain Financial and sought to sell. Meanwhile, Interstate Finance Corporation was founded in Evansville in 1920 and experienced its own series of mergers and acquisitions until it became American General Finance, the consumer finance subsidiary of AIG. In November 2010, Fortress Investment Group purchased a majority stake in American General Finance and renamed it to Springleaf Financial the following year. In November 2015, Springleaf Financial acquired OneMain Financial, with OneMain becoming the surviving brand.

As of December 2020, OneMain had approximately 1,500 branch offices in 44 states.

== History ==
OneMain Financial was formed in November 2010, following Fortress Investment Group's majority purchase of American General Finance from AIG. Fortress subsequently renamed the company to Springleaf Financial and took the company public in October 2013. OneMain in its present form is the result of Springleaf Financial's acquisition of OneMain Financial (formerly CitiFinancial) from Citigroup in November 2015, with OneMain becoming the surviving brand. Both CitiFinancial and American General Finance have their own lines of history as consumer finance companies dating back to the 1910s and 1920s, respectively.

=== CitiFinancial history (1912–2015) ===
Commercial Credit Company (CCC) was established as a public company by Alexander Edward Duncan and eight businessmen in Baltimore, Maryland in 1912. It began as a lender of capital to companies with their accounts receivable as security. Over the course of several decades, CCC adapted to the changing times, expanding into auto financing and personal lending, maneuvering into insurance to provide coverage for the products it was financing, and even manufacturing war-related goods during the World War II and post-war eras. By 1968, the company was the target of a hostile takeover by Loews Corporation, which had already owned 10% of the company's common stock. However, CCC's management sought a different buyer and was able to sway computer company Control Data Corporation (CDC) into acquiring them instead.

CDC initially utilized CCC as a vehicle to assist customers in financing their computer leases and to stabilize earnings due to the seasonality of the computer business. However, as the computer business became more cutthroat and computer leasing was falling in favor of purchasing, CDC's business began to wane in the next decade and a half. Meanwhile, CCC accounted for more and more of their profits as it expanded its financial services, but it was unable to keep up with industry peers. In 1984, CDC tried to find a buyer for CCC, but could not sell it for the right price. It subsequently withdrew CCC from the market and accepted Sandy Weill's proposal to spin off CCC into its own public company in 1986. Weill, who had just left American Express after not being lined up as its next CEO, claimed to have pursued the deal for the fun and challenge. He and his associates invested their own money to own 10% of CCC, while CDC retained a 20% stake, with the remaining 70% offered to the public. Weill brought in experienced management to prop up the business to success, exiting unprofitable segments and tripling operating profits within a year.

=== OneMain Financial (formerly Springleaf Financial) (2010–present) ===
In 1912, OneMain Financial was founded by Commercial Credit Company in Baltimore, Maryland to provide working capital to manufacturers and building contractors. After several acquisitions, the company became a part of Citicorp in 1998 and in 2011 the name was changed to OneMain Financial.

In 1920, Interstate Finance Corporation was founded in Evansville, Indiana, to underwrite sales of Inland Motor Truck vehicles. After several acquisitions, the company became a part of AIG in 2001. In 2010, Fortress Investment Group acquired the business from AIG. In 2011, the company changed its name to Springleaf Holdings, Inc. Its brand name became Springleaf Financial Services.

In November 2015, Springleaf Holdings, Inc. acquired OneMain Financial from Citigroup for $4.25 billion. The new company kept the name OneMain Financial.

The United States Department of Justice required Springleaf to sell 127 branches and certain related assets to Lendmark Financial Services, LLC. before the merger. The sale was completed in May 2016. The brand migration from Springleaf Financial to OneMain Financial was completed in October 2016.

A bill introduced in California legislation (Assembly Bill 539) that would limit interest rates notably excludes three lenders, OneMain being one of the three lenders. The reason these lenders are exempt from the bill is because their interest is capped at 36 percent, however according to a Pew study the APR is understated due to the aggressive selling of add-on products.

In April 2021, OneMain Acquired Financial Wellness fintech company Trim.

In May 2023, the Consumer Financial Protection Bureau found that OneMain Financial engaged in unlawful activities related to interest charges and how it marketed optional add-on products to customers. The CFPB ordered OneMain Financial to pay at least $10 million in redress to 25,000 customers, an additional $10 million civil penalty, and to make changes to its add-on cancellation and interest refund practices.
