= Jamie Dick =

American racing driver (born 1989)

- Born: James A. Dick V February 5, 1989 (age 37); El Paso, Texas, U.S.
- Height: 6 ft 2 in (1.88 m)
- Weight: 195 lb (88 kg)

NASCAR O'Reilly Auto Parts Series career
- 60 races run over 5 years
- 2015 position: 46th
- Best finish: 24th (2012)
- First race: 2011 Feed the Children 300 (Kentucky)
- Last race: 2015 Buckle Up 200 (Dover)
Wins	Top tens	Poles
0	0	0

NASCAR FedEx Freight Truck Series career
- 14 races run over 4 years
- 2013 position: 112th
- Best finish: 44th (2011)
- First race: 2009 Lucas Oil 200 (Iowa)
- Last race: 2013 SFP 250 (Kansas)
Wins	Top tens	Poles
0	0	0
- Statistics up to date as of May 30, 2015.

James A. Dick V (born February 5, 1989) is an American professional stock car racing driver. A veteran of the NASCAR Camping World West Series, he last competed in the NASCAR Xfinity Series on a part-time basis, driving the No. 55 Chevrolet for Viva Motorsports.

== Racing career ==
Dick began his racing career at the age of nine, competing in kart racing events, before soon moving up to Legends car racing, and then late model competition, including competing in the SRL Southwest Tour. In 2007, at the age of 18, he moved up to the NASCAR West Series - renamed Camping World West Series the following year - scoring eight top ten and one top five finishes over the next two years of competition.

In 2009, Dick made his debut in the NASCAR Camping World Truck Series at Iowa Speedway; he ran a limited schedule in the series over the next two years, scoring a best finish of 16th at Iowa Speedway in 2010.

In 2011, Dick moved up to the NASCAR Nationwide Series, making his first start in the series at Kentucky Speedway in the family-owned and family-sponsored No. 02 Chevrolet. He finished 30th in his inaugural event. He made two more starts in the series in 2011, with the race at Kentucky being his best finish of the year.

For 2012, Dick competed in 14 Nationwide Series, driving the No. 23 Chevrolet in a collaborative effort between the family team, Viva Motorsports, Corrie Stott Racing and R3 Motorsports, with sponsorship from Viva Auto Group, a chain of auto dealerships owned by his father in the El Paso, Texas area. In June, Dick scored a career best 21st-place finish at Dover International Speedway, then finished 19th at Kentucky Speedway in September and 18th at Phoenix International Raceway in November.

In February 2013, Dick announced that he would be running the full 2013 NASCAR Nationwide Series season with his family team, VIVA Motorsports, however he was forced to cut back on his schedule due to a lack of sponsorship.

In 2015, after the Axalta Faster. Tougher. Brighter. 200 at Phoenix International Raceway, Dick was reporting signs of dizziness and fatigue, and upon a visit to the infield care center, he was diagnosed with onset diabetes.

== Personal life ==
Born in El Paso, Texas in 1989, Dick moved to Albuquerque, New Mexico at an early age. He is the son of racer and businessman Jimmy Dick, and is a graduate of the University of Denver.

After his racing career, Dick joined his father's car dealership business, serving as branch principal for multiple dealerships.

== Motorsports career results ==
=== NASCAR ===
(key) (Bold – Pole position awarded by qualifying time. Italics – Pole position earned by points standings or practice time. * – Most laps led.)

==== Xfinity Series ====
NASCAR Xfinity Series results
Year	Team	No.	Make	1	2	3	4	5	6	7	8	9	10	11	12	13	14	15	16	17	18	19	20	21	22	23	24	25	26	27	28	29	30	31	32	33	34	NXSC	Pts	Ref
2011	Viva Motorsports	02	Chevy	DAY	PHO	LVS	BRI	CAL	TEX	TAL	NSH	RCH	DAR	DOV	IOW	CLT	CHI	MCH	ROA	DAY	KEN; 30	NHA	NSH	IRP	IOW; 34	GLN	CGV	BRI	ATL	RCH	CHI	DOV	KAN	CLT				128th	0^{1}	
2011	Viva Motorsports	52	Chevy																																TEX; 31	PHO	HOM	128th	0^{1}	
2012	Corrie Stott Racing	23	Chevy	DAY	PHO; 23	LVS	BRI; 22	CAL	TEX	RCH	TAL	DAR; 23	IOW; 24	CLT	DOV; 21	MCH; 29	ROA	KEN; 24	DAY	NHA; 30	CHI; 29	IND	IOW; 24	GLN	CGV	BRI	ATL	RCH	CHI; 23	KEN; 19	DOV; 25	CLT	KAN	TEX	PHO; 18	HOM		24th	282	
2013	Viva Motorsports	55	Chevy	DAY; 29	PHO; 35	LVS; 22	BRI; 35	CAL; 25	TEX; 25	RCH; DNQ	TAL; 12	DAR	CLT; 34	DOV	IOW	MCH	ROA	KEN; 27	DAY; 25	NHA; 35	CHI	IND	IOW	GLN	MOH	BRI	ATL; 32	RCH; 25	CHI	KEN; 28	DOV	KAN	CLT; 35	TEX	PHO; 22	HOM; 25		28th	277	
2014	Viva Motorsports	55	Chevy	DAY; 27	PHO; 32	LVS; 29	BRI; 23	CAL; 34	TEX; 28	DAR	RCH	TAL; 27	IOW	CLT	DOV	MCH; 33	ROA	KEN; 26	DAY	NHA	CHI; 26	IND; 38	IOW; 27	GLN	MOH	BRI; 21	ATL; 27	RCH; 37	CHI	KEN; 27	DOV; 38	KAN; 27	CLT; 27	TEX; 30	PHO; 27	HOM		25th	314	
2015	Viva Motorsports	55	Chevy	DAY	ATL	LVS; 24	PHO; 28	CAL	TEX	BRI	RCH	TAL	IOW; 25	CLT; 38	DOV; 37	MCH	CHI	DAY	KEN	NHA	IND	IOW	GLN	MOH	BRI	ROA	DAR	RCH	CHI	KEN	DOV	CLT	KAN	TEX	PHO	HOM		46th	68	

==== Camping World Truck Series ====
NASCAR Camping World Truck Series results
Year	Team	No.	Make	1	2	3	4	5	6	7	8	9	10	11	12	13	14	15	16	17	18	19	20	21	22	23	24	25	NCWTC	Pts	Ref
2009	Viva Motorsports	08	Chevy	DAY	CAL	ATL	MAR	KAN	CLT	DOV	TEX	MCH	MLW	MEM	KEN	IRP	NSH	BRI	CHI	IOW; 22	GTW	NHA	LVS	MAR	TAL	TEX	PHO; 21	HOM	66th	197	
2010	Viva Motorsports	86	Chevy	DAY	ATL	MAR	NSH	KAN; 20	DOV	CLT	TEX	MCH	IOW; 16	GTY; 22	IRP	POC	NSH	DAR	BRI	CHI; 29	KEN	NHA	LVS; DNQ	MAR	TAL	TEX; 18	PHO; 26	HOM	48th	585	
2011	Corrie Stott Racing	02	Chevy	DAY; DNQ	PHO			NSH; 30	DOV	CLT; 29	KAN	TEX	KEN	IOW; 23	NSH	IRP	POC	MCH	BRI	ATL	CHI	NHA	KEN	LVS	TAL; 29	MAR	TEX	HOM	44th	86	
2011	Corrie Stott Racing	07	Chevy			DAR; 23	MAR																						44th	86	
2013	SS-Green Light Racing	07	Chevy	DAY	MAR	CAR	KAN; 30	CLT	DOV	TEX	KEN	IOW	ELD	POC	MCH	BRI	MSP	IOW	CHI	LVS	TAL	MAR	TEX	PHO	HOM				112th^{1}	0^{1}	

==== K&N Pro Series West ====
NASCAR K&N Pro Series West results
Year	Team	No.	Make	1	2	3	4	5	6	7	8	9	10	11	12	13	NKNPSWC	Pts	Ref
2007	Golembeski Racing	88	Chevy	CTS; 26	PHO; 20	AMP; 6	ELK	IOW	CNS	SON	DCS	IRW; 20	MMP				23rd	571	
2007	Viva Motorsports	84	Chevy											EVG; 11	CSR	AMP	23rd	571	
2008	Viva Motorsports	88	Chevy	AAS; 9	PHO; 18	CTS; 18	IOW; 17	CNS; 15	SON; 6	IRW; 18	DCS; 15	EVG; 17	MMP; 18	IRW; 15	AMP; 26	AAS; 7	12th	1533	
2009	Viva Motorsports	88	Toyota	CTS; 4													10th	1423	
2009	Viva Motorsports	88	Chevy		AAS; 16					SON; 28	IRW; 15	PIR; 6	MMP; 20	CNS; 7		AAS; 13	10th	1423	
2009	Viva Motorsports	88	Ford			PHO; 29	MAD; 15	IOW	DCS; 10						IOW; 21		10th	1423	
2010	Viva Motorsports	88	Chevy	AAS	PHO	IOW	DCS	SON	IRW	PIR	MRP	CNS	MMP	AAS	PHO; 38		82nd	49	

^{*} Season still in progress
^{1} Ineligible for series points

== See also ==
- List of sportspeople with diabetes
