= Viva Motorsports =

Defunct American stock car racing team

- Owner: Jimmy Dick
- Base: China Grove, North Carolina
- Series: NASCAR Xfinity Series, NASCAR Camping World Truck Series
- Race drivers: Ross Chastain, Jamie Dick, Jeffrey Earnhardt, Brandon Gdovic, David Starr
- Manufacturer: Chevrolet
- Opened: 2009
- Closed: 2015

Career
- Debut: Xfinity Series: 2011 Feed the Children 300 (Kentucky); Camping World Truck Series:2009 Lucas Oil 200 (Iowa)
- Latest race: Xfinity Series: 2015 Great Clips 250 (Michigan); Camping World Truck Series: 2015 Coca-Cola 250 (Talladega)
- Races competed: Total: 71; Xfinity Series: 58; Camping World Truck Series: 13
- Drivers' Championships: Total: 0 Xfinity Series: 0 Camping World Truck Series: 0
- Race victories: Total: 0 Xfinity Series: 0 Camping World Truck Series: 0
- Pole positions: Total: 0 Xfinity Series: 0 Camping World Truck Series: 0

Viva Motorsports (known at various points in its existence as Motorway Motorsports and Viva Motorsports with Frank Cicci) is a former American stock car racing team. It fielded cars for several drivers, but mainly Jamie Dick in the NASCAR Xfinity Series from 2011 to 2015. The team also competed in the NASCAR Camping World Truck Series, and was owned by Jimmy Dick.

== Xfinity Series ==
=== Car No. 02 History ===
Dick ran two races with this car number in 2011, finishing 30th at Kentucky and 34th at Iowa.

=== Car No. 52 History ===
Dick ran one race with this car number in 2011, finishing 34th at Texas.

=== Car No. 55 History ===
In 2013, the team ran Dick in 17 races and David Starr in two races. Dick recorded the team's best finish, a 12th in the Talladega spring race. The team failed to qualify for one race at Richmond.

In 2014, Dick ran 21 races while Ross Chastain ran two races. Chastain had the best finish, an 18th at Charlotte.

In 2015, the team had Dick run five races, Jeffrey Earnhardt in six and Brandon Gdovic in two. Earnhardt recorded the best finish, a 12th at Talladega.

==== Car No. 55 results ====
Year	Driver	No.	Make	1	2	3	4	5	6	7	8	9	10	11	12	13	14	15	16	17	18	19	20	21	22	23	24	25	26	27	28	29	30	31	32	33	34	NXSC	Pts
2011	Jamie Dick	02	Chevy	DAY	PHO	LVS	BRI	CAL	TEX	TAL	NSH	RCH	DAR	DOV	IOW	CLT	CHI	MCH	ROA	DAY	KEN; 30	NHA	NSH	IRP	IOW; 34	GLN	CGV	BRI	ATL	RCH	CHI	DOV	KAN	CLT				66th	24
2011	Jamie Dick	52	Chevy																																TEX; 31	PHO	HOM	66th	24
2013	Jamie Dick	55	Chevy	DAY; 29	PHO; 35	LVS; 22	BRI; 35	CAL; 25	TEX; 25	RCH; DNQ	TAL; 12	DAR	CLT; 34	DOV	IOW	MCH	ROA	KEN; 27	DAY; 25	NHA; 35	CHI						ATL; 32	RCH; 25	CHI	KEN; 28	DOV	KAN	CLT; 35		PHO; 22	HOM; 25		35th	323
2013	David Starr	55	Chevy																			IND; 21	IOW	GLN	MOH	BRI								TEX; 21				35th	323
2014	Jamie Dick	55	Chevy	DAY; 27	PHO; 32	LVS; 29	BRI; 23	CAL; 34	TEX; 28			TAL; 27				MCH; 33		KEN; 26			CHI; 26	IND; 38	IOW; 27			BRI; 21	ATL; 27	RCH; 37		KEN; 27	DOV; 38	KAN; 27	CLT; 27	TEX; 30	PHO; 27			29th	519
2014	Todd Bodine	55	Chevy							DAR; 28					DOV; 36																							29th	519
2014	Jimmy Weller III	55	Chevy								RCH; 40																											29th	519
2014	Caleb Roark	55	Chevy										IOW; 32																									29th	519
2014	Ross Chastain	55	Chevy											CLT; 18					DAY; 29																			29th	519
2014	Andy Lally	55	Chevy														ROA; 7																					29th	519
2014	Brennan Newberry	55	Chevy																	NHA; 24				GLN; 19					CHI; 23									29th	519
2014	Timmy Hill	55	Chevy																						MOH; 37													29th	519
2014	David Starr	55	Chevy																																	HOM; 30		29th	519
2015	Jeffrey Earnhardt	55	Chevy	DAY; 16	ATL; 32			CAL; 28		BRI; 15		TAL; 12				MCH; 34	CHI	DAY	KEN	NHA	IND	IOW	GLN	MOH	BRI	ROA	DAR	RCH	CHI	KEN	DOV	CLT	KAN	TEX	PHO	HOM		38th	296
2015	Jamie Dick	55	Chevy			LVS; 24	PHO; 28						IOW; 25	CLT; 38	DOV; 37																							38th	296
2015	Brandon Gdovic	55	Chevy						TEX; 26		RCH; 30																											38th	296

== Camping World Truck Series ==
=== Truck No. 86 History ===
Dick ran six races and failed to qualify for one in 2010. He recorded a best finish of 16th at Iowa.

=== Truck No. 02 History ===
Dick ran four races and failed to qualify for one with this number in 2011. He recorded a best finish of 23rd at Iowa.

== Ceasing operations ==
On June 15, 2015, a team press release cited a lack of funding and Dick's diagnosis of diabetes as reasons to shut down. The teams assets were sold to Rick Gdovic to form Precision Performance Motorsports. The team had wrecked four cars in the month of May alone.
