= Justin Boston =

American racing driver (born 1989)

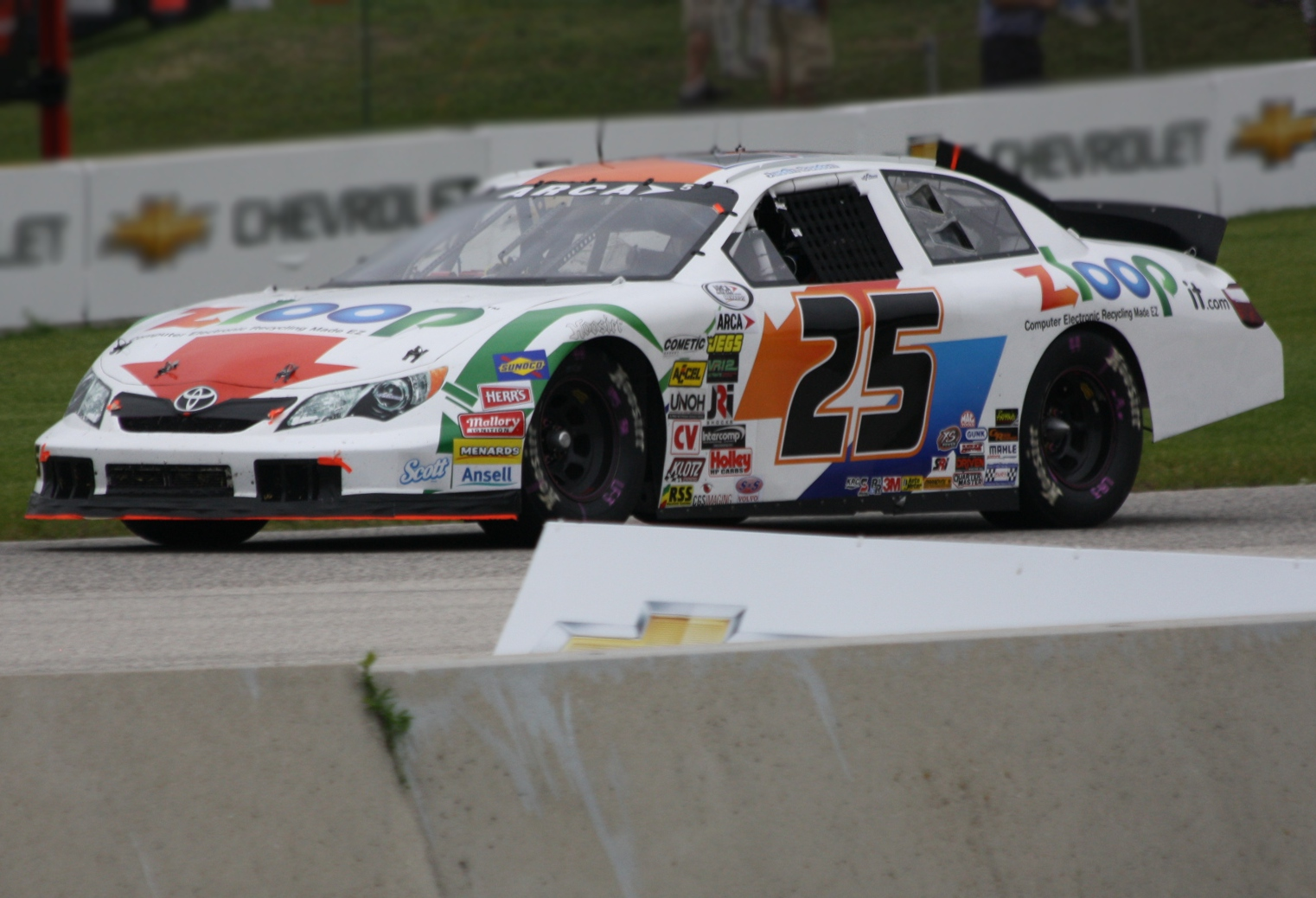
- Boston's No. 25 ARCA car at Road America in 2013
- Born: Justin Michael Boston; September 12, 1989 (age 37); Sparks, Maryland, U.S.

NASCAR O'Reilly Auto Parts Series career
- 2 races run over 1 year
- 2014 position: 95th
- Best finish: 95th (2014)
- First race: 2014 VisitMyrtleBeach.com 300 (Kentucky)
- Last race: 2014 Dover 200 (Dover)
Wins	Top tens	Poles
0	1	0

NASCAR FedEx Freight Truck Series career
- 10 races run over 2 years
- 2015 position: 25th
- Best finish: 25th (2015)
- First race: 2014 UNOH 200 Presented by ZLOOP (Bristol)
- Last race: 2015 American Ethanol 200 (Iowa)
Wins	Top tens	Poles
0	4	0
- Statistics up to date as of April 19, 2020.

Justin Michael Boston (born September 12, 1989) is an American realtor broker and former professional stock car racing driver. A former development driver for Joe Gibbs Racing, he most recently drove the No. 54 Toyota Tundra for Kyle Busch Motorsports in the NASCAR Camping World Truck Series. Boston was the Rookie of the Year in the ARCA Racing Series driving for Venturini Motorsports in 2013.

== Early and personal life ==
Born to parents Robert M. "Bob" and Caron, Boston is one of the few professional race car drivers from the state of Maryland. He is a native of Sparks and Towson, both suburbs of Baltimore. Boston's racing interests were sparked with a dirt bike birthday present at age five, and he would begin his career running motocross in the late 1990s. Boston would practice at the Maryland State Fairgrounds, but would often travel 8–14 hours to get to races in other states. By age 13, he had collected over 300 wins across the country. Boston quit motocross after an incident in which his bike hit him in the head, breaking his helmet and lacerating his face. He began his transition to stock car racing at age 16 after attending a race at Dover International Speedway, and proceeded to enroll at the Buck Baker Racing School in Charlotte, outclassing his fellow students. Boston began his stock car career in Legends Cars, then ran six races in the USAR Pro Cup Series in 2009, with four top-ten finishes. Supported by Turner Scott Motorsports, he proceeded to run in the UARA-STARS late-model series, making the commute from Maryland to Charlotte every weekend. Shortly after enrolling in Washington College, Boston made a full commitment to his racing career, moving to Charlotte. His support, however dried up and he spent 2010 and 2011 out of the sport.

Boston attended high school at the Boys' Latin School of Maryland. Boston's father Bob is the co-founder of Zloop Electronic Recycling, which had sponsored his race efforts from 2013 to 2015. In 2015, the company filed for Chapter 11 bankruptcy. Bob was later convicted of fraud surrounding the company and was sentenced to a 10-year prison sentence in 2018.

== ARCA and NASCAR career ==
=== 2013 ===
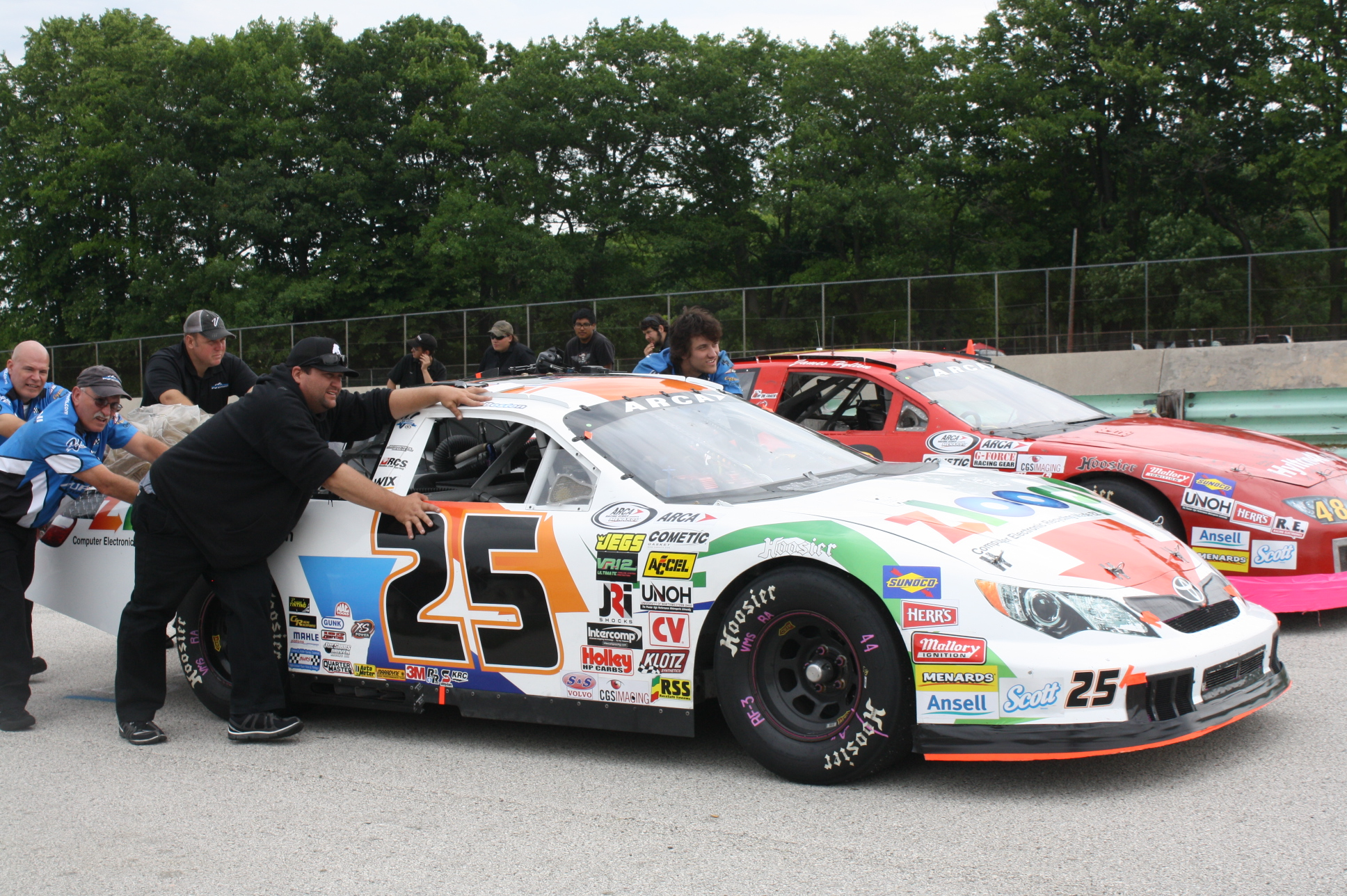
Pit crew pushing his 2013 ARCA car at Road America

In July 2012, Boston signed with Venturini Motorsports to drive the full ARCA Racing Series season in 2013. Coming onto sponsor the team was electronic recycling company Zloop, founded in 2012 and based in Hickory, North Carolina. At the age of 23 years, Boston was one of the older rookies to enter ARCA competition, but was second quickest in December testing at Daytona out of 61 drivers, timing in at 48.871 seconds (184.158 mph). Boston ran the full 21-race schedule, scoring poles at both races at Salem Speedway to go along with 18 total top-ten qualifying efforts. Despite not winning a race, he finished the year with eight top-fives and an impressive 16 top-tens to earn third place in the championship standings behind ten-time champion Frank Kimmel and Mason Mingus. Boston was selected as the 2013 SCOTT rookie of the year.

=== 2014 ===
Boston and ZLOOP resigned with Venturini Motorsports for 2014. Boston scored poles in the first two races of the season, including his third consecutive pole at Salem Speedway. He scored his first victory at the MENARDS 200 at Toledo Speedway in May, after taking the lead from Grant Enfinger with 20 laps to go. It was the first victory at the 0.5 mile track for Venturini since Bill Venturini won in 1987. Boston took his second win of the season at Madison International Speedway in August, after taking the lead on a late race pit stop.

It was announced in August that Boston, Zloop, and Venturini would move up to the Camping World Truck Series starting at Bristol Motor Speedway. Team owner Billy Venturini himself would serve as Boston's crew chief. Boston qualified 27th and finished 30th after a crash. The team planned to run the final three races of the season in preparation for a full-time effort in 2015, but those plans were scrapped when sponsor Zloop shifted their focus to the next season.

In September, it was announced that Boston would make his Nationwide Series debut at Kentucky Speedway for Joe Gibbs Racing in their No. 20 Toyota Camry. Boston also ran the car the following weekend at Dover International Speedway, where his stock car interests originally began. Boston finished 9th in his debut at Kentucky, and followed it up with a 12th at Dover.

=== 2015 ===
In November 2014, it was announced that Boston and Zloop had signed with Kyle Busch Motorsports to run the full 2015 Camping World Truck Series season in the 54 Toyota Tundra in a two-year contract, replacing Bubba Wallace Shannon Rursch was named crew chief for the effort. After nine races and while sitting 12th in the points standings, Boston and KBM parted ways, replaced by Christopher Bell and other drivers. Initial reports stated that Boston and KBM parted ways due to lack of performance and requests for internal changes by Boston not being met. Later reports, however, stated that KBM released Boston due to sponsor Zloop breaching its agreement with the team. The company had initially signed on to be the primary sponsor, but only appeared in two races. It was revealed in August that Zloop failed to make payments to KBM, leading the team to sue the company and Boston for $4.025 million. In 2016, bankruptcy proceedings revealed that Zloop and Boston's father spent more money on Boston's racing career than any other expenditure for the company.

== Motorsports career results ==
=== NASCAR ===
(key) (Bold – Pole position awarded by qualifying time. Italics – Pole position earned by points standings or practice time. * – Most laps led.)

==== Nationwide Series ====
NASCAR Nationwide Series results
Year	Team	No.	Make	1	2	3	4	5	6	7	8	9	10	11	12	13	14	15	16	17	18	19	20	21	22	23	24	25	26	27	28	29	30	31	32	33	NNSC	Pts	Ref
2014	Joe Gibbs Racing	20	Toyota	DAY	PHO	LVS	BRI	CAL	TEX	DAR	RCH	TAL	IOW	CLT	DOV	MCH	ROA	KEN	DAY	NHA	CHI	IND	IOW	GLN	MOH	BRI	ATL	RCH	CHI	KEN; 9	DOV; 12	KAN	CLT	TEX	PHO	HOM	95th	0^{1}	

==== Camping World Truck Series ====
NASCAR Camping World Truck Series results
Year	Team	No.	Make	1	2	3	4	5	6	7	8	9	10	11	12	13	14	15	16	17	18	19	20	21	22	23	NCWTC	Pts	Ref
2014	Venturini Motorsports	25	Toyota	DAY	MAR	KAN	CLT	DOV	TEX	GTW	KEN	IOW	ELD	POC	MCH	BRI; 30	MSP	CHI	NHA	LVS	TAL	MAR	TEX	PHO	HOM		82nd	14	
2015	Kyle Busch Motorsports	54	Toyota	DAY; 29	ATL; 16	MAR; 10	KAN; 7	CLT; 9	DOV; 25	TEX; 8	GTW; 27	IOW; 11	KEN	ELD	POC	MCH	BRI	MSP	CHI	NHA	LVS	TAL	MAR	TEX	PHO	HOM	25th	255	

^{*} Season still in progress
^{1} Ineligible for series points

==== K&N Pro Series East ====
NASCAR K&N Pro Series East results
Year	Team	No.	Make	1	2	3	4	5	6	7	8	9	10	11	12	13	14	NKNPSEC	Pts	Ref
2013	Venturini Motorsports	25	Toyota	BRI; 28	GRE	FIF	RCH	BGS	IOW	LGY	COL	IOW	VIR	GRE	NHA	DOV; 2	RAL	42nd	58	

=== ARCA Racing Series ===
(key) (Bold – Pole position awarded by qualifying time. Italics – Pole position earned by points standings or practice time. * – Most laps led.)

ARCA Racing Series results
Year	Team	No.	Make	1	2	3	4	5	6	7	8	9	10	11	12	13	14	15	16	17	18	19	20	21	ARSC	Pts	Ref
2013	Venturini Motorsports	25	Toyota	DAY; 31	MOB; 6	**SLM**; 9	TAL; 30	TOL; 4	ELK; 4	POC; 9	MCH; 4	ROA; 8	WIN; 18	CHI; 7	NJE; 6	POC; 3	BLN; 6	ISF; 5	MAD; 2	DSF; 3	IOW; 16	**SLM**; 23	KEN; 8	KAN; 5	3rd	5120	
2014	Venturini Motorsports	25	Toyota	DAY; 40	**MOB**; 20	**SLM**; 15	TAL; 12	TOL; 1	NJE; 7*	POC; 22	MCH; 21	ELK; 4	WIN; 3	CHI; 2	IRP; 8	POC; 5	BLN; 7	ISF; 7	MAD; 1	DSF; 2	SLM; 20	**KEN**; 9	KAN; 7		5th	4665	
2015	Venturini Motorsports	55	Toyota	DAY	MOB	NSH	SLM	TAL	TOL	NJE	POC	MCH	CHI	WIN; 5	IOW	IRP	POC	BLN	ISF	DSF; 8	SLM	KEN	KAN		58th	395	
