= 2018 Rinnai 250 =

Race details
- Race 2 of 33 of the 2018 NASCAR Xfinity Series
- Date: February 24, 2018
- Official name: Rinnai 250
- Location: Hampton, Georgia, Atlanta Motor Speedway
- Course: Permanent racing facility
- Course length: 1.54 miles (2.48 km)
- Distance: 163 laps, 251.02 mi (403.98 km)
- Scheduled distance: 163 laps, 251.02 mi (403.98 km)
- Average speed: 129.67 miles per hour (208.68 km/h)

Pole position
Driver	Christopher Bell	Joe Gibbs Racing
- Time: 30.600

Most laps led
Driver	Kevin Harvick	Stewart-Haas Racing with Biagi-DenBiste
- Laps: 141

Winner
No. 98	Kevin Harvick	Stewart-Haas Racing with Biagi-DenBiste

Television in the United States
- Network: Fox Sports 1
- Announcers: Adam Alexander, Michael Waltrip, Chase Elliott

Radio in the United States
- Radio: Performance Racing Network

The 2018 Rinnai 250 was the 2nd stock car race of the 2018 NASCAR Xfinity Series season, and the 27th iteration of the event. The race was held on Saturday, February 24, 2018 in Hampton, Georgia at Atlanta Motor Speedway, a 1.54 miles (2.48 km) permanent asphalt quad-oval intermediate speedway. The race took the scheduled 163 laps to complete. At race's end, Kevin Harvick driving for Stewart-Haas Racing with Biagi-DenBeste would dominate the race and win his 1st and only win of the season driving a part-time schedule. The win was the 47th, and final win of his NASCAR Xfinity Series career. To fill out the podium, Joey Logano of Team Penske and Christopher Bell of Joe Gibbs Racing would finish second and third, respectively.

== Background ==
Atlanta Motor Speedway (formerly Atlanta International Raceway) is a track in Hampton, Georgia, 20 miles (32 km) south of Atlanta. It is a 1.54-mile (2.48 km) quad-oval track with a seating capacity of 111,000. It opened in 1960 as a 1.5-mile (2.4 km) standard oval. In 1994, 46 condominiums were built over the northeastern side of the track. In 1997, to standardize the track with Speedway Motorsports' other two 1.5-mile (2.4 km) ovals, the entire track was almost completely rebuilt. The frontstretch and backstretch were swapped, and the configuration of the track was changed from oval to quad-oval. The project made the track one of the fastest on the NASCAR circuit.

=== Entry list ===
#	Driver	Team	Make	Sponsor
0	Matt Mills	JD Motorsports	Chevrolet	JD Motorsports
00	Cole Custer	Stewart-Haas Racing with Biagi-DenBeste	Ford	Haas CNC
1	Elliott Sadler	JR Motorsports	Chevrolet	Beechcraft, Cessna
01	Vinnie Miller	JD Motorsports	Chevrolet	JAS Expedited Trucking
2	Matt Tifft	Richard Childress Racing	Chevrolet	Surface Sunscreen
3	Ty Dillon	Richard Childress Racing	Chevrolet	Alsco, Red Kap
4	Ross Chastain	JD Motorsports	Chevrolet	Flex Seal
5	Michael Annett	JR Motorsports	Chevrolet	Pilot Flying J
7	Justin Allgaier	JR Motorsports	Chevrolet	Rinnai
8	Tommy Joe Martins	B. J. McLeod Motorsports	Chevrolet	B. J. McLeod Motorsports
9	Tyler Reddick	JR Motorsports	Chevrolet	Nationwide Children's Hospital
11	Ryan Truex	Kaulig Racing	Chevrolet	Bar Harbor
12	Austin Cindric	Team Penske	Ford	Fitzgerald Glider Kits
15	Garrett Smithley	JD Motorsports	Chevrolet	JD Motorsports
16	Ryan Reed	Roush Fenway Racing	Ford	DriveDownA1C.com
18	Kyle Benjamin	Joe Gibbs Racing	Toyota	Peak Antifreeze & Coolant
19	Brandon Jones	Joe Gibbs Racing	Toyota	Menards, Jeld-Wen
20	Christopher Bell	Joe Gibbs Racing	Toyota	Ruud
21	Daniel Hemric	Richard Childress Racing	Chevrolet	South Point Hotel, Casino & Spa
22	Joey Logano	Team Penske	Ford	Discount Tire
23	Spencer Gallagher	GMS Racing	Chevrolet	Allegiant Air
24	Kaz Grala	JGL Racing	Ford	Marlow's Tavern
28	Dylan Lupton	JGL Racing	Ford	ThinQ Technology Partners
35	Joey Gase	Go Green Racing with SS-Green Light Racing	Chevrolet	Donate Life Georgia
36	Alex Labbé	DGM Racing	Chevrolet	Wholey's, Can-Am
38	Jeff Green	RSS Racing	Chevrolet	RSS Racing
39	Ryan Sieg	RSS Racing	Chevrolet	Havoc Construction, Big Frog Custom T-Shirts & More, Atlanta Compressor, Georgia Metals, Inc.
40	Chad Finchum	MBM Motorsports	Toyota	Smithbilt Homes
42	John Hunter Nemechek	Chip Ganassi Racing	Chevrolet	Fire Alarm Services
45	Josh Bilicki	JP Motorsports	Toyota	Prevagen
51	Jeremy Clements	Jeremy Clements Racing	Chevrolet	All South Electric
52	David Starr	Jimmy Means Racing	Chevrolet	Striping Technology, Chasco
55	Stephen Leicht	JP Motorsports	Toyota	Jani-King "The King of Clean"
60	Chase Briscoe	Roush Fenway Racing	Ford	Ford
66	Timmy Hill	MBM Motorsports	Dodge	CrashClaimsR.Us, Chris Kyle Memorial Benefit
74	Mike Harmon	Mike Harmon Racing	Chevrolet	Shadow Warriors Project
76	Spencer Boyd	SS-Green Light Racing	Chevrolet	Grunt Style "This We'll Defend"
78	B. J. McLeod	B. J. McLeod Motorsports	Chevrolet	B. J. McLeod Motorsports
89	Morgan Shepherd	Shepherd Racing Ventures	Chevrolet	Visone RV Motorhome Parts, Racing with Jesus
90	Josh Williams	DGM Racing	Chevrolet	Star Tron
93	J. J. Yeley	RSS Racing	Chevrolet	RSS Racing
98	Kevin Harvick	Stewart-Haas Racing with Biagi-DenBeste	Ford	Hunt Brothers Pizza
99	?*	B. J. McLeod Motorsports	Chevrolet	
Official entry list

*Withdrew.

== Practice ==
=== First practice ===
First practice was held on Friday, February 23 at 1:05 PM EST. Christopher Bell of Joe Gibbs Racing would set the fastest lap in the session with a 31.068 and an average speed of 178.447 miles per hour (287.183 km/h).

Pos.	#	Driver	Team	Make	Time	Speed
1	20	Christopher Bell	Joe Gibbs Racing	Toyota	31.068	178.447
2	22	Joey Logano	Team Penske	Ford	31.265	177.323
3	00	Cole Custer	Stewart-Haas Racing with Biagi-DenBeste	Ford	31.512	175.933
Full first practice results

=== Second and final practice ===
The second and final practice was held on Friday, February 23 at 3:05 PM EST. John Hunter Nemechek of Chip Ganassi Racing would set the fastest time in the session with a 31.056 and an average speed of 178.516 miles per hour (287.294 km/h).

Pos.	#	Driver	Team	Make	Time	Speed
1	42	John Hunter Nemechek	Chip Ganassi Racing	Chevrolet	31.056	178.516
2	20	Christopher Bell	Joe Gibbs Racing	Toyota	31.293	177.164
3	00	Cole Custer	Stewart-Haas Racing with Biagi-DenBeste	Ford	31.342	176.887
Full final practice results

== Qualifying ==
Qualifying would take place on Saturday, February 24, at 9:10 AM EST. Since Atlanta Motor Speedway is under 2 miles (3.2 km), the qualifying system was a multi-car system that included three rounds. The first round was 15 minutes, where every driver would be able to set a lap within the 15 minutes. Then, the second round would consist of the fastest 24 cars in Round 1, and drivers would have 10 minutes to set a lap. Round 3 consisted of the fastest 12 drivers from Round 2, and the drivers would have 5 minutes to set a time. Whoever was fastest in Round 3 would win the pole.

Christopher Bell of Joe Gibbs Racing would win the pole after setting a fast enough time in the first two rounds to advance to the next, with Bell achieving a lap in Round 3 with a time of 30.600 and an average speed of 181.176 miles per hour (291.575 km/h).

Two drivers would fail to qualify: Josh Bilicki and Mike Harmon.

=== Full qualifying results ===
Pos.	#	Driver	Team	Make	Time (R1)	Speed (R1)	Time (R2)	Speed (R2)	Time (R3)	Speed (R3)
1	20	Christopher Bell	Joe Gibbs Racing	Toyota	30.676	180.728	30.328	182.801	30.600	181.176
2	22	Joey Logano	Team Penske	Ford	30.104	184.162	30.534	181.568	30.630	180.999
3	42	John Hunter Nemechek	Chip Ganassi Racing	Chevrolet	30.208	183.528	30.311	182.904	30.669	180.769
4	00	Cole Custer	Stewart-Haas Racing with Biagi-DenBeste	Ford	30.665	180.792	30.465	181.979	30.690	180.645
5	98	Kevin Harvick	Stewart-Haas Racing with Biagi-DenBeste	Ford	30.602	181.165	30.696	180.610	30.691	180.639
6	21	Daniel Hemric	Richard Childress Racing	Chevrolet	30.613	181.100	30.774	180.152	30.725	180.439
7	19	Brandon Jones	Joe Gibbs Racing	Toyota	30.864	179.627	30.758	180.246	30.842	179.755
8	18	Kyle Benjamin	Joe Gibbs Racing	Toyota	31.030	178.666	30.715	180.498	30.851	179.702
9	12	Austin Cindric	Team Penske	Ford	30.643	180.922	30.583	181.277	30.852	179.697
10	1	Elliott Sadler	JR Motorsports	Chevrolet	30.780	180.117	30.630	180.999	30.856	179.673
11	9	Tyler Reddick	JR Motorsports	Chevrolet	30.648	180.893	30.833	179.807	30.926	179.267
12	16	Ryan Reed	Roush Fenway Racing	Ford	30.898	179.429	30.698	180.598	30.958	179.081
Eliminated in Round 2
13	23	Spencer Gallagher	GMS Racing	Chevrolet	30.895	179.447	30.874	179.569	—	—
14	2	Matt Tifft	Richard Childress Racing	Chevrolet	30.752	180.281	30.887	179.493	—	—
15	11	Ryan Truex	Kaulig Racing	Chevrolet	30.915	179.330	30.925	179.272	—	—
16	3	Ty Dillon	Richard Childress Racing	Chevrolet	30.742	180.340	30.940	179.186	—	—
17	7	Justin Allgaier	JR Motorsports	Chevrolet	30.769	180.181	30.978	178.966	—	—
18	60	Chase Briscoe	Roush Fenway Racing	Ford	31.098	178.275	31.024	178.700	—	—
19	93	J. J. Yeley	RSS Racing	Chevrolet	30.584	181.271	31.024	178.700	—	—
20	24	Kaz Grala	JGL Racing	Ford	31.372	176.718	31.129	178.098	—	—
21	5	Michael Annett	JR Motorsports	Chevrolet	31.274	177.272	31.198	177.704	—	—
22	51	Jeremy Clements	Jeremy Clements Racing	Chevrolet	31.033	178.649	31.422	176.437	—	—
23	78	B. J. McLeod	B. J. McLeod Motorsports	Chevrolet	31.416	176.471	32.283	171.731	—	—
24	4	Ross Chastain	JD Motorsports	Chevrolet	31.269	177.300	—	—	—	—
Eliminated in Round 1
25	39	Ryan Sieg	RSS Racing	Chevrolet	31.568	175.621	—	—	—	—
26	8	Tommy Joe Martins	B. J. McLeod Motorsports	Chevrolet	31.656	175.133	—	—	—	—
27	38	Jeff Green	RSS Racing	Chevrolet	31.701	174.884	—	—	—	—
28	28	Dylan Lupton	JGL Racing	Ford	31.713	174.818	—	—	—	—
29	66	Timmy Hill	MBM Motorsports	Dodge	31.716	174.801	—	—	—	—
30	35	Joey Gase	Go Green Racing with SS-Green Light Racing	Chevrolet	31.756	174.581	—	—	—	—
31	89	Morgan Shepherd	Shepherd Racing Ventures	Chevrolet	31.832	174.164	—	—	—	—
32	15	Garrett Smithley	JD Motorsports	Chevrolet	31.869	173.962	—	—	—	—
33	36	Alex Labbé	DGM Racing	Chevrolet	31.936	173.597	—	—	—	—
Qualified by owner's points
34	40	Chad Finchum	MBM Motorsports	Toyota	32.033	173.072	—	—	—	—
35	76	Spencer Boyd	SS-Green Light Racing	Chevrolet	32.141	172.490	—	—	—	—
36	52	David Starr	Jimmy Means Racing	Chevrolet	32.266	171.822	—	—	—	—
37	90	Josh Williams	DGM Racing	Chevrolet	32.424	170.984	—	—	—	—
38	55	Stephen Leicht	JP Motorsports	Toyota	32.901	168.506	—	—	—	—
39	01	Vinnie Miller	JD Motorsports	Chevrolet	32.999	168.005	—	—	—	—
40	0	Matt Mills	JD Motorsports	Chevrolet	33.016	167.919	—	—	—	—
Failed to qualify or withdrew
41	45	Josh Bilicki	JP Motorsports	Toyota	32.474	170.721	—	—	—	—
42	74	Mike Harmon	Mike Harmon Racing	Chevrolet	32.608	170.020	—	—	—	—
WD	99	?	B. J. McLeod Motorsports	Chevrolet	—	—	—	—	—	—
Official qualifying results
Official starting lineup

== Race results ==
Stage 1 Laps: 40

Fin	#	Driver	Team	Make	Pts
1	98	Kevin Harvick	Stewart-Haas Racing with Biagi-DenBeste	Ford	0
2	20	Christopher Bell	Joe Gibbs Racing	Toyota	9
3	16	Ryan Reed	Roush Fenway Racing	Ford	8
4	22	Joey Logano	Team Penske	Ford	0
5	9	Tyler Reddick	JR Motorsports	Chevrolet	6
6	18	Kyle Benjamin	Joe Gibbs Racing	Toyota	5
7	1	Elliott Sadler	JR Motorsports	Chevrolet	4
8	12	Austin Cindric	Team Penske	Ford	3
9	3	Ty Dillon	Richard Childress Racing	Chevrolet	0
10	7	Justin Allgaier	JR Motorsports	Chevrolet	1

Stage 2 Laps: 40

Fin	#	Driver	Team	Make	Pts
1	98	Kevin Harvick	Stewart-Haas Racing with Biagi-DenBeste	Ford	0
2	20	Christopher Bell	Joe Gibbs Racing	Toyota	9
3	22	Joey Logano	Team Penske	Ford	0
4	1	Elliott Sadler	JR Motorsports	Chevrolet	7
5	9	Tyler Reddick	JR Motorsports	Chevrolet	6
6	7	Justin Allgaier	JR Motorsports	Chevrolet	5
7	12	Austin Cindric	Team Penske	Ford	4
8	3	Ty Dillon	Richard Childress Racing	Chevrolet	0
9	21	Daniel Hemric	Richard Childress Racing	Chevrolet	2
10	16	Ryan Reed	Roush Fenway Racing	Ford	1

Stage 3 Laps: 83

Fin	St	#	Driver	Team	Make	Laps	Led	Status	Pts
1	5	98	Kevin Harvick	Stewart-Haas Racing with Biagi-DenBeste	Ford	163	141	running	0
2	2	22	Joey Logano	Team Penske	Ford	163	10	running	0
3	1	20	Christopher Bell	Joe Gibbs Racing	Toyota	163	12	running	52
4	3	42	John Hunter Nemechek	Chip Ganassi Racing	Chevrolet	163	0	running	33
5	10	1	Elliott Sadler	JR Motorsports	Chevrolet	163	0	running	43
6	17	7	Justin Allgaier	JR Motorsports	Chevrolet	163	0	running	37
7	9	12	Austin Cindric	Team Penske	Ford	163	0	running	37
8	8	18	Kyle Benjamin	Joe Gibbs Racing	Toyota	162	0	running	34
9	15	11	Ryan Truex	Kaulig Racing	Chevrolet	162	0	running	28
10	12	16	Ryan Reed	Roush Fenway Racing	Ford	162	0	running	36
11	6	21	Daniel Hemric	Richard Childress Racing	Chevrolet	162	0	running	28
12	14	2	Matt Tifft	Richard Childress Racing	Chevrolet	162	0	running	25
13	16	3	Ty Dillon	Richard Childress Racing	Chevrolet	162	0	running	0
14	13	23	Spencer Gallagher	GMS Racing	Chevrolet	162	0	running	23
15	18	60	Chase Briscoe	Roush Fenway Racing	Ford	162	0	running	22
16	24	4	Ross Chastain	JD Motorsports	Chevrolet	162	0	running	21
17	7	19	Brandon Jones	Joe Gibbs Racing	Toyota	161	0	running	20
18	33	36	Alex Labbé	DGM Racing	Chevrolet	161	0	running	19
19	11	9	Tyler Reddick	JR Motorsports	Chevrolet	161	0	running	30
20	21	5	Michael Annett	JR Motorsports	Chevrolet	161	0	running	17
21	28	28	Dylan Lupton	JGL Racing	Ford	160	0	running	16
22	25	39	Ryan Sieg	RSS Racing	Chevrolet	160	0	running	15
23	20	24	Kaz Grala	JGL Racing	Ford	159	0	running	14
24	37	90	Josh Williams	DGM Racing	Chevrolet	159	0	running	13
25	32	15	Garrett Smithley	JD Motorsports	Chevrolet	159	0	running	12
26	30	35	Joey Gase	Go Green Racing with SS-Green Light Racing	Chevrolet	159	0	running	11
27	22	51	Jeremy Clements	Jeremy Clements Racing	Chevrolet	158	0	running	10
28	36	52	David Starr	Jimmy Means Racing	Chevrolet	158	0	running	9
29	35	76	Spencer Boyd	SS-Green Light Racing	Chevrolet	158	0	running	8
30	23	78	B. J. McLeod	B. J. McLeod Motorsports	Chevrolet	158	0	running	7
31	39	01	Vinnie Miller	JD Motorsports	Chevrolet	158	0	running	6
32	38	55	Stephen Leicht	JP Motorsports	Toyota	157	0	running	5
33	26	8	Tommy Joe Martins	B. J. McLeod Motorsports	Chevrolet	156	0	running	4
34	29	66	Timmy Hill	MBM Motorsports	Dodge	156	0	running	3
35	34	40	Chad Finchum	MBM Motorsports	Toyota	155	0	running	2
36	40	0	Matt Mills	JD Motorsports	Chevrolet	154	0	running	1
37	19	93	J. J. Yeley	RSS Racing	Chevrolet	92	0	engine	1
38	31	89	Morgan Shepherd	Shepherd Racing Ventures	Chevrolet	49	0	brakes	1
39	4	00	Cole Custer	Stewart-Haas Racing with Biagi-DenBeste	Ford	10	0	crash	1
40	27	38	Jeff Green	RSS Racing	Chevrolet	5	0	vibration	1
Failed to qualify or withdrew
41		45	Josh Bilicki	JP Motorsports	Toyota				
42		74	Mike Harmon	Mike Harmon Racing	Chevrolet				
WD		99	?	B. J. McLeod Motorsports	Chevrolet				
Official race results

Previous race: 2018 PowerShares QQQ 300	NASCAR Xfinity Series; 2018 season	Next race: 2018 Boyd Gaming 300
