= 2014 History 300 =

11th race of the 2014 NASCAR Nationwide Series

Race details
- Race 11 of 33 of the 2014 NASCAR Nationwide Series
- Date: May 24, 2014
- Official name: 33th Annual History 300
- Location: Concord, North Carolina, Charlotte Motor Speedway
- Course: Permanent racing facility
- Course length: 1.5 miles (2.41 km)
- Distance: 200 laps, 300 mi (482.803 km)
- Scheduled distance: 200 laps, 300 mi (482.803 km)
- Average speed: 149.771 miles per hour (241.033 km/h)

Pole position
Driver	Kyle Busch	Joe Gibbs Racing
- Time: 29.493

Most laps led
Driver	Kyle Larson	Turner Scott Motorsports
- Laps: 82

Winner
No. 42	Kyle Larson	Turner Scott Motorsports

Television in the United States
- Network: ABC
- Announcers: Dave Burns, Dale Jarrett, Andy Petree

Radio in the United States
- Radio: Performance Racing Network

The 2014 History 300 was the 11th stock car race of the 2014 NASCAR Nationwide Series season, and the 33rd iteration of the event. The race was held on Saturday, May 24, 2014, in Concord, North Carolina at Charlotte Motor Speedway, a 1.5 miles (2.4 km) permanent quad-oval. The race took the scheduled 200 laps to complete. Turner Scott Motorsports driver Kyle Larson would manage to dominate the late stages of the race to take his second career NASCAR Nationwide Series victory and his second and final victory of the season. To fill out the podium, Team Penske driver Brad Keselowski and Joe Gibbs Racing driver Kyle Busch would finish second and third, respectively.

== Background ==
The layout of Charlotte Motor Speedway, the venue where the race was held.

The race was held at Charlotte Motor Speedway, located in Concord, North Carolina. The speedway complex includes a 1.5-mile (2.4 km) quad-oval track that was utilized for the race, as well as a dragstrip and a dirt track. The speedway was built in 1959 by Bruton Smith and is considered the home track for NASCAR with many race teams based in the Charlotte metropolitan area. The track is owned and operated by Speedway Motorsports Inc. (SMI) with Marcus G. Smith serving as track president.

=== Entry list ===
- (R) denotes rookie driver.
- (i) denotes driver who is ineligible for series driver points.

#	Driver	Team	Make	Sponsor
01	Landon Cassill	JD Motorsports	Chevrolet	Flex Seal
2	Brian Scott	Richard Childress Racing	Chevrolet	Anderson's Maple Syrup, Food Lion
3	Ty Dillon (R)	Richard Childress Racing	Chevrolet	Bass Pro Shops, National Wild Turkey Federation
4	Jeffrey Earnhardt	JD Motorsports	Chevrolet	Flex Shot
5	Kevin Harvick (i)	JR Motorsports	Chevrolet	Hunt Brothers Pizza
6	Trevor Bayne	Roush Fenway Racing	Ford	AdvoCare
7	Regan Smith	JR Motorsports	Chevrolet	Fire Alarm Services Patriotic
9	Chase Elliott (R)	JR Motorsports	Chevrolet	NAPA Auto Parts
11	Elliott Sadler	Joe Gibbs Racing	Toyota	OneMain Financial
14	Eric McClure	TriStar Motorsports	Toyota	Hefty Ultimate
16	Ryan Reed (R)	Roush Fenway Racing	Ford	American Diabetes Association
17	Tanner Berryhill (R)	Vision Racing	Dodge	National Cash Lenders
19	Mike Bliss	TriStar Motorsports	Toyota	SupportMilitary.org
20	Matt Kenseth (i)	Joe Gibbs Racing	Toyota	GameStop, Mario Kart 8
22	Brad Keselowski (i)	Team Penske	Ford	Discount Tire Patriotic
23	Carlos Contreras	Rick Ware Racing	Chevrolet	38 Special, Voli Vodka
25	John Wes Townley (i)	Athenian Motorsports	Toyota	Zaxby's
28	J. J. Yeley	JGL Racing	Dodge	Texas 28 Spirits Stage
31	Dylan Kwasniewski (R)	Turner Scott Motorsports	Chevrolet	Rockstar, AccuDoc Solutions
39	Ryan Sieg (R)	RSS Racing	Chevrolet	Pull-A-Part, Cherokee Charcoal
40	Josh Wise (i)	The Motorsports Group	Chevrolet	The Motorsports Group
42	Kyle Larson (i)	Turner Scott Motorsports	Chevrolet	Eneos
43	Dakoda Armstrong (R)	Richard Petty Motorsports	Ford	Fresh from Florida
44	David Starr	TriStar Motorsports	Toyota	Central Texas Lath & Plaster, Chasco
51	Jeremy Clements	Jeremy Clements Racing	Chevrolet	All South Electric
52	Joey Gase	Jimmy Means Racing	Chevrolet	Agri Supply Company
54	Kyle Busch (i)	Joe Gibbs Racing	Toyota	Monster Energy
55	Ross Chastain (i)	Viva Motorsports	Chevrolet	Florida Watermelon Association
60	Chris Buescher (R)	Roush Fenway Racing	Ford	Roush Performance
62	Brendan Gaughan	Richard Childress Racing	Chevrolet	South Point Hotel, Casino & Spa
70	Derrike Cope	Derrike Cope Racing	Chevrolet	Youtheory
74	Kevin Lepage	Mike Harmon Racing	Dodge	Fryin' Saucer Guys
76	Tommy Joe Martins (R)	Martins Motorsports	Dodge	Martins Motorsports
80	Johnny Sauter (i)	Hattori Racing Enterprises	Toyota	Toyota
84	Chad Boat (R)	Billy Boat Motorsports	Chevrolet	Billy Boat Motorsports
86	Kyle Fowler	Deware Racing Group	Chevrolet	Bubba Burger
87	Chris Cockrum (i)	Rick Ware Racing	Chevrolet	Advanced Communications Group
93	Harrison Rhodes	JGL Racing	Dodge	Voxer
98	Jeb Burton (i)	Biagi-DenBeste Racing	Ford	Kendall-Jackson Avant
99	James Buescher	RAB Racing	Toyota	Rheem
Official entry list

== Practice ==
=== First practice ===
The first practice session was held on Thursday, May 22, at 4:00 PM EST. The session would last for one hour. Brian Scott, driving for Richard Childress Racing, would set the fastest time in the session, with a lap of 30.221 and an average speed of 178.684 miles per hour (287.564 km/h).

Pos.	#	Driver	Team	Make	Time	Speed
1	2	Brian Scott	Richard Childress Racing	Chevrolet	30.221	178.684
2	54	Kyle Busch (i)	Joe Gibbs Racing	Toyota	30.248	178.524
3	20	Matt Kenseth (i)	Joe Gibbs Racing	Toyota	30.296	178.241
Full first practice results

=== Final practice ===
The final practice session, sometimes referred to as Happy Hour, was held on Thursday, May 22, at 5:30 PM EST. The session would last for one hour and 20 minutes. Chase Elliott, driving for JR Motorsports, would set the fastest time in the session, with a lap of 30.281 and an average speed of 178.330 miles per hour (286.994 km/h).

Pos.	#	Driver	Team	Make	Time	Speed
1	9	Chase Elliott (R)	JR Motorsports	Chevrolet	30.281	178.330
2	2	Brian Scott	Richard Childress Racing	Chevrolet	30.306	178.183
3	7	Regan Smith	JR Motorsports	Chevrolet	30.449	177.346
Full Happy Hour practice results

== Qualifying ==
Qualifying was held on Saturday, May 24, at 10:40 AM EST. Since Talladega Superspeedway is at least 1.25 miles (2.01 km) in length, the qualifying system was a multi-car system that included three rounds. The first round was 25 minutes, where every driver would be able to set a lap within the 25 minutes. Then, the second round would consist of the fastest 24 cars in Round 1, and drivers would have 10 minutes to set a lap. Round 3 consisted of the fastest 12 drivers from Round 2, and the drivers would have 5 minutes to set a time. Whoever was fastest in Round 3 would win the pole.

Kyle Busch, driving for Joe Gibbs Racing, would win the pole after setting a time of 29.493 and an average speed of 183.094 mph (294.661 km/h) in the third round.

No drivers would fail to qualify.

=== Full qualifying results ===
Pos.	#	Driver	Team	Make	Time (R1)	Speed (R1)	Time (R2)	Speed (R2)	Time (R3)	Speed (R3)
1	54	Kyle Busch (i)	Joe Gibbs Racing	Toyota	-*	-*	-*	-*	29.493	183.094
2	22	Brad Keselowski (i)	Team Penske	Ford	-*	-*	-*	-*	29.564	182.655
3	42	Kyle Larson (i)	Turner Scott Motorsports	Chevrolet	-*	-*	-*	-*	29.638	182.199
4	31	Dylan Kwasniewski (R)	Turner Scott Motorsports	Chevrolet	-*	-*	-*	-*	29.705	181.788
5	5	Kevin Harvick (i)	JR Motorsports	Chevrolet	-*	-*	-*	-*	29.745	181.543
6	2	Brian Scott	Richard Childress Racing	Chevrolet	-*	-*	-*	-*	29.851	180.898
7	20	Matt Kenseth (i)	Joe Gibbs Racing	Toyota	-*	-*	-*	-*	29.942	180.349
8	7	Regan Smith	JR Motorsports	Chevrolet	-*	-*	-*	-*	30.015	179.910
9	9	Chase Elliott (R)	JR Motorsports	Chevrolet	-*	-*	-*	-*	30.018	179.892
10	11	Elliott Sadler	Joe Gibbs Racing	Toyota	-*	-*	-*	-*	30.050	179.700
11	3	Ty Dillon (R)	Richard Childress Racing	Chevrolet	-*	-*	-*	-*	30.165	179.015
12	98	Jeb Burton (i)	Biagi-DenBeste Racing	Ford	-*	-*	-*	-*	30.340	177.983
Eliminated in Round 2
13	60	Chris Buescher (R)	Roush Fenway Racing	Ford	-*	-*	30.145	179.134	-	-
14	01	Landon Cassill	JD Motorsports	Chevrolet	-*	-*	30.160	179.045	-	-
15	99	James Buescher	RAB Racing	Toyota	-*	-*	30.208	178.761	-	-
16	6	Trevor Bayne	Roush Fenway Racing	Ford	-*	-*	30.222	178.678	-	-
17	84	Chad Boat (R)	Billy Boat Motorsports	Chevrolet	-*	-*	30.271	178.389	-	-
18	19	Mike Bliss	TriStar Motorsports	Toyota	-*	-*	30.279	178.341	-	-
19	55	Ross Chastain (i)	Viva Motorsports	Chevrolet	-*	-*	30.291	178.271	-	-
20	62	Brendan Gaughan	Richard Childress Racing	Chevrolet	-*	-*	30.323	178.083	-	-
21	28	J. J. Yeley	JGL Racing	Dodge	-*	-*	30.575	176.615	-	-
22	44	David Starr	TriStar Motorsports	Toyota	-*	-*	30.668	176.079	-	-
23	16	Ryan Reed (R)	Roush Fenway Racing	Ford	-*	-*	30.693	175.936	-	-
24	80	Johnny Sauter (i)	Hattori Racing Enterprises	Toyota	-*	-*	30.733	175.707	-	-
Eliminated in Round 1
25	40	Josh Wise (i)	The Motorsports Group	Chevrolet	30.715	175.810	-	-	-	-
26	25	John Wes Townley (i)	Athenian Motorsports	Toyota	30.725	175.753	-	-	-	-
27	43	Dakoda Armstrong (R)	Richard Petty Motorsports	Ford	30.753	175.593	-	-	-	-
28	39	Ryan Sieg (R)	RSS Racing	Chevrolet	30.769	175.501	-	-	-	-
29	4	Jeffrey Earnhardt	JD Motorsports	Chevrolet	30.812	175.256	-	-	-	-
30	86	Kyle Fowler	Deware Racing Group	Chevrolet	30.893	174.797	-	-	-	-
31	51	Jeremy Clements	Jeremy Clements Racing	Chevrolet	31.049	173.919	-	-	-	-
32	76	Tommy Joe Martins (R)	Martins Motorsports	Dodge	31.065	173.829	-	-	-	-
33	23	Carlos Contreras	Rick Ware Racing	Chevrolet	31.153	173.338	-	-	-	-
34	14	Eric McClure	TriStar Motorsports	Toyota	31.179	173.193	-	-	-	-
35	74	Kevin Lepage	Mike Harmon Racing	Dodge	31.326	172.381	-	-	-	-
36	70	Derrike Cope	Derrike Cope Racing	Chevrolet	31.338	172.315	-	-	-	-
37	93	Harrison Rhodes	JGL Racing	Dodge	31.481	171.532	-	-	-	-
38	52	Joey Gase	Jimmy Means Racing	Toyota	31.909	169.231	-	-	-	-
39	87	Chris Cockrum (i)	Rick Ware Racing	Chevrolet	32.734	164.966	-	-	-	-
40	17	Tanner Berryhill (R)	Vision Racing	Dodge	-	-	-	-	-	-
Official starting lineup

*Time not available.

== Race results ==
Fin	St	#	Driver	Team	Make	Laps	Led	Status	Pts	Winnings
1	3	42	Kyle Larson (i)	Turner Scott Motorsports	Chevrolet	200	82	running	0	$58,525
2	2	22	Brad Keselowski (i)	Team Penske	Ford	200	22	running	0	$44,300
3	1	54	Kyle Busch (i)	Joe Gibbs Racing	Toyota	200	27	running	0	$41,000
4	5	5	Kevin Harvick (i)	JR Motorsports	Chevrolet	200	0	running	0	$26,550
5	6	2	Brian Scott	Richard Childress Racing	Chevrolet	200	0	running	39	$29,000
6	7	20	Matt Kenseth (i)	Joe Gibbs Racing	Toyota	200	67	running	0	$19,775
7	8	7	Regan Smith	JR Motorsports	Chevrolet	200	0	running	37	$25,050
8	16	6	Trevor Bayne	Roush Fenway Racing	Ford	200	0	running	36	$23,100
9	13	60	Chris Buescher (R)	Roush Fenway Racing	Ford	200	0	running	35	$23,300
10	11	3	Ty Dillon (R)	Richard Childress Racing	Chevrolet	200	0	running	34	$22,825
11	15	99	James Buescher	RAB Racing	Toyota	200	1	running	34	$21,000
12	10	11	Elliott Sadler	Joe Gibbs Racing	Toyota	200	0	running	32	$20,475
13	4	31	Dylan Kwasniewski (R)	Turner Scott Motorsports	Chevrolet	199	0	running	31	$19,975
14	23	16	Ryan Reed (R)	Roush Fenway Racing	Ford	199	0	running	30	$19,400
15	12	98	Jeb Burton (i)	Biagi-DenBeste Racing	Ford	198	0	running	0	$19,680
16	24	80	Johnny Sauter (i)	Hattori Racing Enterprises	Toyota	198	0	running	0	$13,000
17	20	62	Brendan Gaughan	Richard Childress Racing	Chevrolet	198	0	running	27	$18,575
18	19	55	Ross Chastain (i)	Viva Motorsports	Chevrolet	197	0	running	0	$18,350
19	27	43	Dakoda Armstrong (R)	Richard Petty Motorsports	Ford	197	0	running	25	$18,275
20	18	19	Mike Bliss	TriStar Motorsports	Toyota	197	0	running	24	$18,825
21	21	28	J. J. Yeley	JGL Racing	Dodge	197	0	running	23	$18,075
22	26	25	John Wes Townley (i)	Athenian Motorsports	Toyota	197	0	running	0	$12,020
23	31	51	Jeremy Clements	Jeremy Clements Racing	Chevrolet	197	1	running	22	$17,970
24	22	44	David Starr	TriStar Motorsports	Toyota	197	0	running	20	$17,905
25	29	4	Jeffrey Earnhardt	JD Motorsports	Chevrolet	196	0	running	19	$18,370
26	17	84	Chad Boat (R)	Billy Boat Motorsports	Chevrolet	196	0	running	18	$17,835
27	28	39	Ryan Sieg (R)	RSS Racing	Chevrolet	196	0	running	17	$17,800
28	25	40	Josh Wise (i)	The Motorsports Group	Chevrolet	195	0	running	0	$17,765
29	34	14	Eric McClure	TriStar Motorsports	Toyota	194	0	running	15	$17,720
30	14	01	Landon Cassill	JD Motorsports	Chevrolet	193	0	running	14	$17,975
31	32	76	Tommy Joe Martins (R)	Martins Motorsports	Dodge	191	0	running	13	$17,640
32	30	86	Kyle Fowler	Deware Racing Group	Chevrolet	191	0	running	12	$11,595
33	33	23	Carlos Contreras	Rick Ware Racing	Chevrolet	191	0	running	11	$17,550
34	38	52	Joey Gase	Jimmy Means Racing	Toyota	189	0	running	10	$17,520
35	39	87	Chris Cockrum (i)	Rick Ware Racing	Chevrolet	186	0	running	0	$17,485
36	36	70	Derrike Cope	Derrike Cope Racing	Chevrolet	184	0	running	8	$16,600
37	9	9	Chase Elliott (R)	JR Motorsports	Chevrolet	174	0	running	7	$16,600
38	37	93	Harrison Rhodes	JGL Racing	Dodge	135	0	engine	6	$16,556
39	35	74	Kevin Lepage	Mike Harmon Racing	Dodge	95	0	rear gear	5	$10,435
40	40	17	Tanner Berryhill (R)	Vision Racing	Dodge	81	0	engine	4	$10,330
Official race results

== Standings after the race ==
Drivers' Championship standings

	Pos	Driver	Points
2	1	Regan Smith	414
	2	Elliott Sadler	409 (-5)
2	3	Chase Elliott	386 (-28)
1	4	Trevor Bayne	378 (–35)
1	5	Ty Dillon	377 (–36)
	6	Brian Scott	354 (–60)
	7	Brendan Gaughan	309 (–105)
	8	James Buescher	303 (–111)
	9	Chris Buescher	295 (–119)
1	10	Dylan Kwasniewski	285 (–129)
Official driver's standings

- Note: Only the first 10 positions are included for the driver standings.

Previous race: 2014 Get To Know Newton 250	NASCAR Nationwide Series; 2014 season	Next race: 2014 Buckle Up 200
