= 2018 Boyd Gaming 300 =

Third race of the 2018 NASCAR Xfinity Series

Race details
- Race 3 of 33 of the 2018 NASCAR Xfinity Series
- Date: March 3, 2018
- Official name: Boyd Gaming 300
- Location: North Las Vegas, Nevada, Las Vegas Motor Speedway
- Course: Permanent racing facility
- Course length: 1.5 miles (2.41 km)
- Distance: 200 laps, 300 mi (482.803 km)
- Scheduled distance: 200 laps, 300 mi (482.803 km)
- Average speed: 131.884 miles per hour (212.247 km/h)

Pole position
Driver	Christopher Bell	Joe Gibbs Racing
- Time: 29.398

Most laps led
Driver	Kyle Larson	Chip Ganassi Racing
- Laps: 142

Winner
No. 42	Kyle Larson	Chip Ganassi Racing

Television in the United States
- Network: Fox Sports 1
- Announcers: Adam Alexander, Michael Waltrip, Brad Keselowski

Radio in the United States
- Radio: Performance Racing Network

The 2018 Boyd Gaming 300 was the 3rd stock car race of the 2018 NASCAR Xfinity Series season, and the 22nd iteration of the event. The race was held on Saturday, March 3, 2018 in North Las Vegas, Nevada at Las Vegas Motor Speedway, a 1.5 miles (2.4 km) permanent D-shaped oval racetrack. The race took the scheduled 200 laps to complete. At race's end, Kyle Larson of Chip Ganassi Racing would dominate and hold off the field on the final restart with 6 to go to win the race, the 9th NASCAR Xfinity Series win of his career and the 1st of his part-time season. To fill out the podium, Christopher Bell for Joe Gibbs Racing and Justin Allgaier of JR Motorsports would finish second and third, respectively.

== Background ==
The layout of Las Vegas Motor Speedway, the venue where the race was held.

Las Vegas Motor Speedway, located in Clark County, Nevada outside the Las Vegas city limits and about 15 miles northeast of the Las Vegas Strip, is a 1,200-acre (490 ha) complex of multiple tracks for motorsports racing. The complex is owned by Speedway Motorsports, Inc., which is headquartered in Charlotte, North Carolina.

=== Entry list ===
#	Driver	Team	Make	Sponsor
0	Matt Mills	JD Motorsports	Chevrolet	Flex Glue
00	Cole Custer	Stewart-Haas Racing with Biagi-DenBeste	Ford	Haas CNC
1	Elliott Sadler	JR Motorsports	Chevrolet	OneMain Financial "Lending Done Human"
01	Vinnie Miller	JD Motorsports	Chevrolet	JAS Expedited Trucking
2	Matt Tifft	Richard Childress Racing	Chevrolet	Tunity "Hear Any Muted TV"
3	Austin Dillon	Richard Childress Racing	Chevrolet	Go Green Equipment
4	Ross Chastain	JD Motorsports	Chevrolet	Flex Seal
5	Michael Annett	JR Motorsports	Chevrolet	Pilot Flying J
7	Justin Allgaier	JR Motorsports	Chevrolet	Brandt Professional Agriculture
8	Tommy Joe Martins	B. J. McLeod Motorsports	Chevrolet	B. J. McLeod Motorsports
9	Tyler Reddick	JR Motorsports	Chevrolet	Nationwide Children's Hospital
11	Ryan Truex	Kaulig Racing	Chevrolet	Bar Harbor
15	Garrett Smithley	JD Motorsports	Chevrolet	Flex Tape
16	Ryan Reed	Roush Fenway Racing	Ford	DriveDownA1C.com
18	Kyle Busch	Joe Gibbs Racing	Toyota	Interstate Batteries
19	Brandon Jones	Joe Gibbs Racing	Toyota	Menards, Bali Blinds
20	Christopher Bell	Joe Gibbs Racing	Toyota	Rheem, Smurfit Kappa
21	Daniel Hemric	Richard Childress Racing	Chevrolet	South Point Hotel, Casino & Spa
22	Ryan Blaney	Team Penske	Ford	Fitzgerald Glider Kits
23	Spencer Gallagher	GMS Racing	Chevrolet	Allegiant Air
24	Kaz Grala	JGL Racing	Ford	Nettts
28	Dylan Lupton	JGL Racing	Ford	ThinQ Technology Partners
35	Joey Gase	Go Green Racing with SS-Green Light Racing	Chevrolet	Nevada Donor Network
36	Alex Labbé	DGM Racing	Chevrolet	Wholey's, Can-Am
38	Jeff Green	RSS Racing	Chevrolet	RSS Racing
39	Ryan Sieg	RSS Racing	Chevrolet	Big Valley Towing
40	Chad Finchum	MBM Motorsports	Toyota	Smithbilt Homes
42	Kyle Larson	Chip Ganassi Racing	Chevrolet	DC Solar
45	Josh Bilicki	JP Motorsports	Toyota	Prevagen
51	Jeremy Clements	Jeremy Clements Racing	Chevrolet	RepairableVehicles.com
52	David Starr	Jimmy Means Racing	Chevrolet	Striping Technology, Chasco
55	Stephen Leicht	JP Motorsports	Toyota	Jani-King "The King of Clean"
60	Austin Cindric	Roush Fenway Racing	Ford	Pirtek
66	Timmy Hill	MBM Motorsports	Dodge	CrashClaimsR.Us, Chris Kyle Memorial Benefit
74	Mike Harmon	Mike Harmon Racing	Chevrolet	Shadow Warriors Project
76	Spencer Boyd	SS-Green Light Racing	Chevrolet	Grunt Style "This We'll Defend"
78	B. J. McLeod	B. J. McLeod Motorsports	Chevrolet	JW Transport, Zomongo
89	Morgan Shepherd	Shepherd Racing Ventures	Chevrolet	Visone RV Motorhome Parts, Racing with Jesus
90	Josh Williams	DGM Racing	Chevrolet	Star Tron
93	J. J. Yeley	RSS Racing	Chevrolet	RSS Racing
99	?*	B. J. McLeod Motorsports	Chevrolet	
Official entry list

== Practice ==
=== First practice ===
The first practice was held on Friday, March 2 at 12:05 PM PST. Kyle Larson of Chip Ganassi Racing would set the fastest time in the session, with a lap of 30.070 and an average speed of 179.581 miles per hour (289.008 km/h).

Pos.	#	Driver	Team	Make	Time	Speed
1	42	Kyle Larson	Chip Ganassi Racing	Chevrolet	30.070	179.581
2	22	Ryan Blaney	Team Penske	Ford	30.115	179.313
3	18	Kyle Busch	Joe Gibbs Racing	Toyota	30.169	178.992
Full first practice results

=== Second and final practice ===
The second and final practice was held on Friday, March 2 at 2:05 PM PST. Kyle Larson of Chip Ganassi Racing would set the fastest time in the session, with a lap of 30.002 and an average speed of 179.988 miles per hour (289.663 km/h).

Pos.	#	Driver	Team	Make	Time	Speed
1	42	Kyle Larson	Chip Ganassi Racing	Chevrolet	30.002	179.988
2	22	Ryan Blaney	Team Penske	Ford	30.136	179.188
3	9	Tyler Reddick	JR Motorsports	Chevrolet	30.147	179.122
Full final practice results

== Qualifying ==
Qualifying would take place on Saturday, March 3, at 10:05 AM PST. Since Las Vegas Motor Speedway is under 2 miles (3.2 km), the qualifying system was a multi-car system that included three rounds. The first round was 15 minutes, where every driver would be able to set a lap within the 15 minutes. Then, the second round would consist of the fastest 24 cars in Round 1, and drivers would have 10 minutes to set a lap. Round 3 consisted of the fastest 12 drivers from Round 2, and the drivers would have 5 minutes to set a time. Whoever was fastest in Round 3 would win the pole.

Christopher Bell of Joe Gibbs Racing would win the pole after advancing from both preliminary rounds and setting the fastest lap in Round 3, with a time of 29.398 and an average speed of 183.686 miles per hour (295.614 km/h).

No drivers would fail to qualify.

=== Full qualifying results ===
Pos.	#	Driver	Team	Make	Time (R1)	Speed (R1)	Time (R2)	Speed (R2)	Time (R3)	Speed (R3)
1	20	Christopher Bell	Joe Gibbs Racing	Toyota	30.377	177.766	29.580	182.556	29.398	183.686
2	42	Kyle Larson	Chip Ganassi Racing	Chevrolet	29.617	182.328	29.467	183.256	29.442	183.411
3	21	Daniel Hemric	Richard Childress Racing	Chevrolet	29.930	180.421	29.806	181.172	29.497	183.069
4	00	Cole Custer	Stewart-Haas Racing with Biagi-DenBeste	Ford	30.141	179.158	29.797	181.226	29.538	182.815
5	18	Kyle Busch	Joe Gibbs Racing	Toyota	29.902	180.590	29.565	182.648	29.561	182.673
6	1	Elliott Sadler	JR Motorsports	Chevrolet	30.466	177.247	29.710	181.757	29.640	182.186
7	9	Tyler Reddick	JR Motorsports	Chevrolet	30.080	179.521	29.718	181.708	29.656	182.088
8	22	Ryan Blaney	Team Penske	Ford	29.787	181.287	29.688	181.892	29.680	181.941
9	2	Matt Tifft	Richard Childress Racing	Chevrolet	30.289	178.283	29.883	180.705	29.743	181.555
10	3	Austin Dillon	Richard Childress Racing	Chevrolet	30.215	178.719	29.895	180.632	29.809	181.153
11	23	Spencer Gallagher	GMS Racing	Chevrolet	30.115	179.313	29.930	180.421	29.918	180.493
12	7	Justin Allgaier	JR Motorsports	Chevrolet	30.427	177.474	29.865	180.814	30.003	179.982
Eliminated in Round 2
13	16	Ryan Reed	Roush Fenway Racing	Ford	30.311	178.153	29.986	180.084	—	—
14	4	Ross Chastain	JD Motorsports	Chevrolet	30.081	179.515	29.987	180.078	—	—
15	60	Austin Cindric	Roush Fenway Racing	Ford	30.117	179.301	29.987	180.078	—	—
16	19	Brandon Jones	Joe Gibbs Racing	Toyota	30.476	177.189	30.022	179.868	—	—
17	11	Ryan Truex	Kaulig Racing	Chevrolet	30.461	177.276	30.105	179.372	—	—
18	24	Kaz Grala	JGL Racing	Ford	30.724	175.758	30.107	179.360	—	—
19	5	Michael Annett	JR Motorsports	Chevrolet	30.554	176.736	30.155	179.075	—	—
20	51	Jeremy Clements	Jeremy Clements Racing	Chevrolet	30.368	177.819	30.290	178.277	—	—
21	39	Ryan Sieg	RSS Racing	Chevrolet	30.289	178.283	30.305	178.188	—	—
22	28	Dylan Lupton	JGL Racing	Ford	30.734	175.701	30.319	178.106	—	—
23	35	Joey Gase	Go Green Racing with SS-Green Light Racing	Chevrolet	30.382	177.737	30.386	177.713	—	—
24	36	Alex Labbé	DGM Racing	Chevrolet	30.368	177.819	30.440	177.398	—	—
Eliminated in Round 1
25	66	Timmy Hill	MBM Motorsports	Dodge	30.778	175.450	—	—	—	—
26	15	Garrett Smithley	JD Motorsports	Chevrolet	30.790	175.382	—	—	—	—
27	0	Matt Mills	JD Motorsports	Chevrolet	31.085	173.717	—	—	—	—
28	93	J. J. Yeley	RSS Racing	Chevrolet	31.121	173.516	—	—	—	—
29	90	Josh Williams	DGM Racing	Chevrolet	31.223	172.949	—	—	—	—
30	40	Chad Finchum	MBM Motorsports	Toyota	31.233	172.894	—	—	—	—
31	76	Spencer Boyd	SS-Green Light Racing	Chevrolet	31.285	172.607	—	—	—	—
32	38	Jeff Green	RSS Racing	Chevrolet	31.320	172.414	—	—	—	—
33	8	Tommy Joe Martins	B. J. McLeod Motorsports	Chevrolet	31.323	172.397	—	—	—	—
Qualified by owner's points
34	78	B. J. McLeod	B. J. McLeod Motorsports	Chevrolet	31.523	171.303	—	—	—	—
35	52	David Starr	Jimmy Means Racing	Chevrolet	31.787	169.881	—	—	—	—
36	89	Morgan Shepherd	Shepherd Racing Ventures	Chevrolet	31.934	169.099	—	—	—	—
37	01	Vinnie Miller	JD Motorsports	Chevrolet	31.993	168.787	—	—	—	—
38	74	Mike Harmon	Mike Harmon Racing	Chevrolet	32.080	168.329	—	—	—	—
39	45	Josh Bilicki	JP Motorsports	Toyota	32.448	166.420	—	—	—	—
40	55	Stephen Leicht	JP Motorsports	Toyota	32.474	166.287	—	—	—	—
Withdrew
WD	99	?	B. J. McLeod Motorsports	Chevrolet	—	—	—	—	—	—
Official qualifying results
Official starting lineup

== Race results ==
Stage 1 Laps: 45

Fin	#	Driver	Team	Make	Pts
1	20	Christopher Bell	Joe Gibbs Racing	Toyota	10
2	42	Kyle Larson	Chip Ganassi Racing	Chevrolet	0
3	9	Tyler Reddick	JR Motorsports	Chevrolet	8
4	18	Kyle Busch	Joe Gibbs Racing	Toyota	0
5	22	Ryan Blaney	Team Penske	Ford	0
6	19	Brandon Jones	Joe Gibbs Racing	Toyota	5
7	21	Daniel Hemric	Richard Childress Racing	Chevrolet	4
8	00	Cole Custer	Stewart-Haas Racing with Biagi-DenBeste	Ford	3
9	1	Elliott Sadler	JR Motorsports	Chevrolet	2
10	7	Justin Allgaier	JR Motorsports	Chevrolet	1

Stage 2 Laps: 45

Fin	#	Driver	Team	Make	Pts
1	42	Kyle Larson	Chip Ganassi Racing	Chevrolet	0
2	22	Ryan Blaney	Team Penske	Ford	0
3	7	Justin Allgaier	JR Motorsports	Chevrolet	8
4	00	Cole Custer	Stewart-Haas Racing with Biagi-DenBeste	Ford	7
5	9	Tyler Reddick	JR Motorsports	Chevrolet	6
6	1	Elliott Sadler	JR Motorsports	Chevrolet	5
7	19	Brandon Jones	Joe Gibbs Racing	Toyota	4
8	21	Daniel Hemric	Richard Childress Racing	Chevrolet	3
9	20	Christopher Bell	Joe Gibbs Racing	Toyota	2
10	18	Kyle Busch	Joe Gibbs Racing	Toyota	0

Stage 3 Laps: 110

Fin	St	#	Driver	Team	Make	Laps	Led	Status	Pts
1	2	42	Kyle Larson	Chip Ganassi Racing	Chevrolet	200	142	running	0
2	1	20	Christopher Bell	Joe Gibbs Racing	Toyota	200	6	running	47
3	12	7	Justin Allgaier	JR Motorsports	Chevrolet	200	12	running	43
4	8	22	Ryan Blaney	Team Penske	Ford	200	33	running	0
5	6	1	Elliott Sadler	JR Motorsports	Chevrolet	200	0	running	39
6	3	21	Daniel Hemric	Richard Childress Racing	Chevrolet	200	0	running	38
7	16	19	Brandon Jones	Joe Gibbs Racing	Toyota	200	0	running	39
8	7	9	Tyler Reddick	JR Motorsports	Chevrolet	200	3	running	43
9	4	00	Cole Custer	Stewart-Haas Racing with Biagi-DenBeste	Ford	200	4	running	38
10	11	23	Spencer Gallagher	GMS Racing	Chevrolet	200	0	running	27
11	9	2	Matt Tifft	Richard Childress Racing	Chevrolet	200	0	running	26
12	10	3	Austin Dillon	Richard Childress Racing	Chevrolet	200	0	running	0
13	19	5	Michael Annett	JR Motorsports	Chevrolet	200	0	running	24
14	5	18	Kyle Busch	Joe Gibbs Racing	Toyota	200	0	running	0
15	17	11	Ryan Truex	Kaulig Racing	Chevrolet	200	0	running	22
16	18	24	Kaz Grala	JGL Racing	Ford	200	0	running	21
17	24	36	Alex Labbé	DGM Racing	Chevrolet	200	0	running	20
18	14	4	Ross Chastain	JD Motorsports	Chevrolet	199	0	running	19
19	13	16	Ryan Reed	Roush Fenway Racing	Ford	199	0	running	18
20	23	35	Joey Gase	Go Green Racing with SS-Green Light Racing	Chevrolet	197	0	running	17
21	29	90	Josh Williams	DGM Racing	Chevrolet	197	0	running	16
22	20	51	Jeremy Clements	Jeremy Clements Racing	Chevrolet	196	0	running	15
23	26	15	Garrett Smithley	JD Motorsports	Chevrolet	196	0	running	14
24	37	01	Vinnie Miller	JD Motorsports	Chevrolet	196	0	running	13
25	33	8	Tommy Joe Martins	B. J. McLeod Motorsports	Chevrolet	195	0	running	12
26	34	78	B. J. McLeod	B. J. McLeod Motorsports	Chevrolet	195	0	running	11
27	27	0	Matt Mills	JD Motorsports	Chevrolet	194	0	running	10
28	39	45	Josh Bilicki	JP Motorsports	Toyota	189	0	running	9
29	21	39	Ryan Sieg	RSS Racing	Chevrolet	185	0	engine	8
30	40	55	Stephen Leicht	JP Motorsports	Toyota	185	0	running	7
31	38	74	Mike Harmon	Mike Harmon Racing	Chevrolet	183	0	running	6
32	30	40	Chad Finchum	MBM Motorsports	Toyota	140	0	suspension	5
33	25	66	Timmy Hill	MBM Motorsports	Dodge	134	0	power steering	4
34	15	60	Austin Cindric	Roush Fenway Racing	Ford	132	0	crash	3
35	35	52	David Starr	Jimmy Means Racing	Chevrolet	78	0	engine	2
36	31	76	Spencer Boyd	SS-Green Light Racing	Chevrolet	70	0	suspension	1
37	36	89	Morgan Shepherd	Shepherd Racing Ventures	Chevrolet	24	0	oil leak	1
38	28	93	J. J. Yeley	RSS Racing	Chevrolet	18	0	vibration	1
39	32	38	Jeff Green	RSS Racing	Chevrolet	15	0	brakes	1
40	22	28	Dylan Lupton	JGL Racing	Ford	5	0	crash	1
Withdrew
WD		99	?	B. J. McLeod Motorsports	Chevrolet				
Official race results

Previous race: 2018 Rinnai 250	NASCAR Xfinity Series; 2018 season	Next race: 2018 DC Solar 200
