= 2018 DC Solar 200 =

Race details
- Race 4 of 33 of the 2018 NASCAR Xfinity Series
- Date: March 10, 2018
- Official name: 14th Annual DC Solar 200
- Location: Avondale, Arizona, ISM Raceway
- Course: Permanent racing facility
- Course length: 1 miles (1.6 km)
- Distance: 200 laps, 200 mi (321.868 km)
- Scheduled distance: 200 laps, 200 mi (321.868 km)
- Average speed: 103.019 miles per hour (165.793 km/h)

Pole position
Driver	Justin Allgaier	JR Motorsports
- Time: 26.896

Most laps led
Driver	Justin Allgaier	JR Motorsports
- Laps: 76

Winner
No. 22	Brad Keselowski	Team Penske

Television in the United States
- Network: Fox Sports 1
- Announcers: Adam Alexander, Michael Waltrip, Ryan Blaney

Radio in the United States
- Radio: Motor Racing Network

The 2018 DC Solar 200 was the fourth stock car race of the 2018 NASCAR Xfinity Series season and the 14th iteration of the event. The race was held on Saturday, March 10, 2018 in Avondale, Arizona, at ISM Raceway, a 1 mile (1.6 km) permanent low-banked tri-oval race track. The race took the scheduled 200 laps to complete. At race's end, Brad Keselowski of Team Penske would take control after the final pit stops to overcome a penalty and win his 37th career NASCAR Xfinity Series season and his first of his part-time season. To fill out the podium, Justin Allgaier of JR Motorsports and Kyle Busch of Joe Gibbs Racing would finish second and third, respectively.

== Background ==
ISM Raceway – also known as PIR – is a one-mile, low-banked tri-oval race track located in Avondale, Arizona. It is named after the nearby metropolitan area of Phoenix. The motorsport track opened in 1964 and currently hosts two NASCAR race weekends annually. PIR has also hosted the IndyCar Series, CART, USAC and the Rolex Sports Car Series. The raceway is currently owned and operated by International Speedway Corporation.

The raceway was originally constructed with a 2.5 mi (4.0 km) road course that ran both inside and outside of the main tri-oval. In 1991 the track was reconfigured with the current 1.51 mi (2.43 km) interior layout. PIR has an estimated grandstand seating capacity of around 67,000. Lights were installed around the track in 2004 following the addition of a second annual NASCAR race weekend.

ISM Raceway is home to two annual NASCAR race weekends, one of 13 facilities on the NASCAR schedule to host more than one race weekend a year. The track is both the first and last stop in the western United States, as well as the fourth and penultimate track on the schedule.

=== Entry list ===
#	Driver	Team	Make	Sponsor
0	Garrett Smithley	JD Motorsports	Chevrolet	Flex Glue
00	Cole Custer	Stewart-Haas Racing with Biagi-DenBeste	Ford	Haas Automation
1	Elliott Sadler	JR Motorsports	Chevrolet	Beechcraft, Cessna
01	Vinnie Miller	JD Motorsports	Chevrolet	Flex Tape
2	Matt Tifft	Richard Childress Racing	Chevrolet	Dollar Shave Club #DSC500
3	Ty Dillon	Richard Childress Racing	Chevrolet	Cabela's, Bass Pro Shops
4	Ross Chastain	JD Motorsports	Chevrolet	Flex Seal
5	Michael Annett	JR Motorsports	Chevrolet	Pilot Flying J
7	Justin Allgaier	JR Motorsports	Chevrolet	Brandt Professional Agriculture
8	Tommy Joe Martins	B. J. McLeod Motorsports	Chevrolet	B. J. McLeod Motorsports
9	Tyler Reddick	JR Motorsports	Chevrolet	Nationwide Children's Hospital
11	Ryan Truex	Kaulig Racing	Chevrolet	Bar Harbor
15	Matt Mills	JD Motorsports	Chevrolet	Flex Shot
16	Ryan Reed	Roush Fenway Racing	Ford	DriveDownA1C.com
18	Kyle Busch	Joe Gibbs Racing	Toyota	NOS Energy
19	Brandon Jones	Joe Gibbs Racing	Toyota	Juniper Networks
20	Christopher Bell	Joe Gibbs Racing	Toyota	Rheem
21	Daniel Hemric	Richard Childress Racing	Chevrolet	South Point Hotel, Casino & Spa
22	Brad Keselowski	Team Penske	Ford	Fitzgerald Glider Kits
23	Spencer Gallagher	GMS Racing	Chevrolet	Kingman Chevrolet
24	Kaz Grala	JGL Racing	Ford	Nettts
28	Dylan Lupton	JGL Racing	Ford	ThinQ Technology Partners
35	Joey Gase	Go Green Racing with SS-Green Light Racing	Chevrolet	Donate Life Arizona
36	Alex Labbé	DGM Racing	Chevrolet	Wholey's, Can-Am
38	J. J. Yeley	RSS Racing	Chevrolet	Superior Essex
39	Ryan Sieg	RSS Racing	Chevrolet	TAP & Sons, Lighting SouthWest
40	Chad Finchum	MBM Motorsports	Toyota	MBM Motorsports
42	Jamie McMurray	Chip Ganassi Racing	Chevrolet	DC Solar
45	Josh Bilicki	JP Motorsports	Toyota	Prevagen
51	Jeremy Clements	Jeremy Clements Racing	Chevrolet	RepairableVehicles.com
52	David Starr	Jimmy Means Racing	Chevrolet	Whataburger
55	Stephen Leicht	JP Motorsports	Toyota	Jani-King "The King of Clean"
60	Austin Cindric	Roush Fenway Racing	Ford	Pirtek
66	Timmy Hill	MBM Motorsports	Chevrolet	CrashClaimsR.Us, Chris Kyle Memorial Benefit
74	Mike Harmon	Mike Harmon Racing	Chevrolet	Shadow Warriors Project, Koolbox
76	Spencer Boyd	SS-Green Light Racing	Chevrolet	Grunt Style "This We'll Defend"
78	B. J. McLeod	B. J. McLeod Motorsports	Chevrolet	JW Transport
89	Morgan Shepherd	Shepherd Racing Ventures	Chevrolet	Visone RV Motorhome Parts, Racing with Jesus
90	Josh Williams	DGM Racing	Chevrolet	Scott Foundation, Phoenix Children's Hospital
93	Jeff Green	RSS Racing	Chevrolet	RSS Racing
Official entry list

== Practice ==
=== First practice ===
The first 50-minute practice session would occur on Friday, March 9, at 12:05 PM MST. Christopher Bell of Joe Gibbs Racing would set the fastest lap in the session with a time of 26.892 and an average speed of 133.869 miles per hour (215.441 km/h).

Pos.	#	Driver	Team	Make	Time	Speed
1	20	Christopher Bell	Joe Gibbs Racing	Toyota	26.892	133.869
2	18	Kyle Busch	Joe Gibbs Racing	Toyota	27.220	132.256
3	7	Justin Allgaier	JR Motorsports	Chevrolet	27.401	131.382
Full first practice results

=== Second and final practice ===
The second and final 50-minute practice session would occur on Friday, March 9, at 2:05 PM MST. Cole Custer of Stewart-Haas Racing with Biagi-DenBeste would set the fastest lap in the session with a time of 27.393 and an average speed of 131.420 miles per hour (211.500 km/h).

Pos.	#	Driver	Team	Make	Time	Speed
1	00	Cole Custer	Stewart-Haas Racing with Biagi-DenBeste	Ford	27.393	131.420
2	18	Kyle Busch	Joe Gibbs Racing	Toyota	27.513	130.847
3	22	Brad Keselowski	Team Penske	Ford	27.527	130.781
Full final practice results

== Qualifying ==
Qualifying would take place on Saturday, March 10, at 11:05 AM MST. Since ISM Raceway is under 2 miles (3.2 km), the qualifying system was a multi-car system that included three rounds. The first round was 15 minutes, where every driver would be able to set a lap within the 15 minutes. Then, the second round would consist of the fastest 24 cars in Round 1, and drivers would have 10 minutes to set a lap. Round 3 consisted of the fastest 12 drivers from Round 2, and the drivers would have 5 minutes to set a time. Whoever was fastest in Round 3 would win the pole.

Justin Allgaier would win the pole after making through both preliminary rounds and setting a time of 26.896 and an average speed of 133.849 miles per hour (215.409 km/h) in the third round. No drivers would fail to qualify,

=== Full qualifying results ===
Pos.	#	Driver	Team	Make	Time (R1)	Speed (R1)	Time (R2)	Speed (R2)	Time (R3)	Speed (R3)
1	7	Justin Allgaier	JR Motorsports	Chevrolet					26.896	133.849
2	22	Brad Keselowski	Team Penske	Ford					26.909	133.784
3	00	Cole Custer	Stewart-Haas Racing with Biagi-DenBeste	Ford					26.910	133.779
4	20	Christopher Bell	Joe Gibbs Racing	Toyota					26.933	133.665
5	18	Kyle Busch	Joe Gibbs Racing	Toyota					26.940	133.630
6	42	Jamie McMurray	Chip Ganassi Racing	Chevrolet					27.016	133.254
7	11	Ryan Truex	Kaulig Racing	Chevrolet					27.023	133.220
8	21	Daniel Hemric	Richard Childress Racing	Chevrolet					27.056	133.057
9	2	Matt Tifft	Richard Childress Racing	Chevrolet					27.092	132.881
10	19	Brandon Jones	Joe Gibbs Racing	Toyota					27.142	132.636
11	16	Ryan Reed	Roush Fenway Racing	Ford					27.341	131.670
12	23	Spencer Gallagher	GMS Racing	Chevrolet					27.378	131.492
Eliminated in Round 2
13	60	Austin Cindric	Roush Fenway Racing	Ford			27.350	131.627	—	—
14	3	Ty Dillon	Richard Childress Racing	Chevrolet			27.356	131.598	—	—
15	5	Michael Annett	JR Motorsports	Chevrolet			27.373	131.516	—	—
16	38	J. J. Yeley	RSS Racing	Chevrolet			27.462	131.090	—	—
17	24	Kaz Grala	JGL Racing	Ford			27.475	131.028	—	—
18	4	Ross Chastain	JD Motorsports	Chevrolet			27.503	130.895	—	—
19	35	Joey Gase	Go Green Racing with SS-Green Light Racing	Chevrolet			27.627	130.307	—	—
20	28	Dylan Lupton	JGL Racing	Ford			27.757	129.697	—	—
21	51	Jeremy Clements	Jeremy Clements Racing	Chevrolet			27.773	129.622	—	—
22	36	Alex Labbé	DGM Racing	Chevrolet			27.867	129.185	—	—
23	39	Ryan Sieg	RSS Racing	Chevrolet			27.932	128.884	—	—
24	1	Elliott Sadler	JR Motorsports	Chevrolet	27.826	129.375	—	—	—	—
Eliminated in Round 1
25	93	Jeff Green	RSS Racing	Chevrolet	27.963	128.742	—	—	—	—
26	78	B. J. McLeod	B. J. McLeod Motorsports	Chevrolet	27.967	128.723	—	—	—	—
27	8	Tommy Joe Martins	B. J. McLeod Motorsports	Chevrolet	28.009	128.530	—	—	—	—
28	90	Josh Williams	DGM Racing	Chevrolet	28.100	128.114	—	—	—	—
29	89	Morgan Shepherd	Shepherd Racing Ventures	Chevrolet	28.125	128.000	—	—	—	—
30	52	David Starr	Jimmy Means Racing	Chevrolet	28.428	126.636	—	—	—	—
31	0	Garrett Smithley	JD Motorsports	Chevrolet	28.472	126.440	—	—	—	—
32	55	Stephen Leicht	JP Motorsports	Toyota	28.538	126.148	—	—	—	—
33	01	Vinnie Miller	JD Motorsports	Chevrolet	28.662	125.602	—	—	—	—
Qualified by owner's points
34	76	Spencer Boyd	SS-Green Light Racing	Chevrolet	28.669	125.571	—	—	—	—
35	15	Matt Mills	JD Motorsports	Chevrolet	28.830	124.870	—	—	—	—
36	40	Chad Finchum	MBM Motorsports	Toyota	28.874	124.680	—	—	—	—
37	74	Mike Harmon	Mike Harmon Racing	Chevrolet	28.904	124.550	—	—	—	—
38	66	Timmy Hill	MBM Motorsports	Chevrolet	28.966	124.284	—	—	—	—
39	45	Josh Bilicki	JP Motorsports	Toyota	28.987	124.194	—	—	—	—
40	9	Tyler Reddick	JR Motorsports	Chevrolet	—	—	—	—	—	—
Official starting lineup

== Race results ==
Stage 1 Laps: 45

Fin	#	Driver	Team	Make	Pts
1	7	Justin Allgaier	JR Motorsports	Chevrolet	10
2	20	Christopher Bell	Joe Gibbs Racing	Toyota	9
3	22	Brad Keselowski	Team Penske	Ford	0
4	18	Kyle Busch	Joe Gibbs Racing	Toyota	0
5	21	Daniel Hemric	Richard Childress Racing	Chevrolet	6
6	42	Jamie McMurray	Chip Ganassi Racing	Chevrolet	0
7	2	Matt Tifft	Richard Childress Racing	Chevrolet	4
8	19	Brandon Jones	Joe Gibbs Racing	Toyota	3
9	3	Ty Dillon	Richard Childress Racing	Chevrolet	2
10	11	Ryan Truex	Kaulig Racing	Chevrolet	1

Stage 2 Laps: 45

Fin	#	Driver	Team	Make	Pts
1	18	Kyle Busch	Joe Gibbs Racing	Toyota	0
2	21	Daniel Hemric	Richard Childress Racing	Chevrolet	9
3	00	Cole Custer	Stewart-Haas Racing with Biagi-DenBeste	Ford	8
4	42	Jamie McMurray	Chip Ganassi Racing	Chevrolet	0
5	11	Ryan Truex	Kaulig Racing	Chevrolet	6
6	23	Spencer Gallagher	GMS Racing	Chevrolet	5
7	7	Justin Allgaier	JR Motorsports	Chevrolet	4
8	24	Kaz Grala	JGL Racing	Ford	3
9	38	J. J. Yeley	RSS Racing	Chevrolet	2
10	20	Christopher Bell	Joe Gibbs Racing	Toyota	1

Stage 3 Laps: 110

Fin	St	#	Driver	Team	Make	Laps	Led	Status	Pts
1	2	22	Brad Keselowski	Team Penske	Ford	200	66	running	0
2	1	7	Justin Allgaier	JR Motorsports	Chevrolet	200	76	running	49
3	5	18	Kyle Busch	Joe Gibbs Racing	Toyota	200	39	running	0
4	4	20	Christopher Bell	Joe Gibbs Racing	Toyota	200	5	running	43
5	6	42	Jamie McMurray	Chip Ganassi Racing	Chevrolet	200	0	running	0
6	8	21	Daniel Hemric	Richard Childress Racing	Chevrolet	200	0	running	46
7	9	2	Matt Tifft	Richard Childress Racing	Chevrolet	200	0	running	34
8	3	00	Cole Custer	Stewart-Haas Racing with Biagi-DenBeste	Ford	200	0	running	37
9	24	1	Elliott Sadler	JR Motorsports	Chevrolet	199	0	running	28
10	40	9	Tyler Reddick	JR Motorsports	Chevrolet	199	6	running	27
11	10	19	Brandon Jones	Joe Gibbs Racing	Toyota	199	0	running	29
12	17	24	Kaz Grala	JGL Racing	Ford	199	8	running	28
13	14	3	Ty Dillon	Richard Childress Racing	Chevrolet	199	0	running	0
14	12	23	Spencer Gallagher	GMS Racing	Chevrolet	199	0	running	28
15	7	11	Ryan Truex	Kaulig Racing	Chevrolet	199	0	running	29
16	13	60	Austin Cindric	Roush Fenway Racing	Ford	199	0	running	21
17	15	5	Michael Annett	JR Motorsports	Chevrolet	199	0	running	20
18	11	16	Ryan Reed	Roush Fenway Racing	Ford	199	0	running	19
19	18	4	Ross Chastain	JD Motorsports	Chevrolet	199	0	running	18
20	21	51	Jeremy Clements	Jeremy Clements Racing	Chevrolet	198	0	running	17
21	16	38	J. J. Yeley	RSS Racing	Chevrolet	198	0	running	18
22	22	36	Alex Labbé	DGM Racing	Chevrolet	198	0	running	15
23	20	28	Dylan Lupton	JGL Racing	Ford	198	0	running	14
24	19	35	Joey Gase	Go Green Racing with SS-Green Light Racing	Chevrolet	197	0	running	13
25	23	39	Ryan Sieg	RSS Racing	Chevrolet	197	0	running	12
26	26	78	B. J. McLeod	B. J. McLeod Motorsports	Chevrolet	196	0	running	11
27	27	8	Tommy Joe Martins	B. J. McLeod Motorsports	Chevrolet	195	0	running	10
28	31	0	Garrett Smithley	JD Motorsports	Chevrolet	195	0	running	9
29	28	90	Josh Williams	DGM Racing	Chevrolet	194	0	running	8
30	34	76	Spencer Boyd	SS-Green Light Racing	Chevrolet	194	0	running	7
31	32	55	Stephen Leicht	JP Motorsports	Toyota	193	0	running	6
32	39	45	Josh Bilicki	JP Motorsports	Toyota	193	0	running	5
33	33	01	Vinnie Miller	JD Motorsports	Chevrolet	192	0	running	4
34	38	66	Timmy Hill	MBM Motorsports	Chevrolet	190	0	running	3
35	37	74	Mike Harmon	Mike Harmon Racing	Chevrolet	185	0	running	2
36	36	40	Chad Finchum	MBM Motorsports	Toyota	104	0	engine	1
37	29	89	Morgan Shepherd	Shepherd Racing Ventures	Chevrolet	56	0	brakes	1
38	35	15	Matt Mills	JD Motorsports	Chevrolet	54	0	crash	1
39	30	52	David Starr	Jimmy Means Racing	Chevrolet	24	0	engine	1
40	25	93	Jeff Green	RSS Racing	Chevrolet	18	0	brakes	1
Official race results

Previous race: 2018 Boyd Gaming 300	NASCAR Xfinity Series; 2018 season	Next race: 2018 Roseanne 300
