= 2014 Aaron's 312 =

Ninth race of the 2014 NASCAR Nationwide Series

Race details
- Race 9 of 33 of the 2014 NASCAR Nationwide Series
- Date: May 3, 2014
- Official name: 23rd Annual Aaron's 312
- Location: Lincoln, Alabama, Talladega Superspeedway
- Course: Permanent racing facility
- Course length: 2.66 miles (4.28 km)
- Distance: 117 laps, 311.22 mi (500.86 km)
- Scheduled distance: 117 laps, 311.22 mi (500.86 km)
- Average speed: 131.224 miles per hour (211.185 km/h)

Pole position
Driver	Sam Hornish Jr.	Joe Gibbs Racing
- Time: 51.268

Most laps led
Driver	Elliott Sadler	Joe Gibbs Racing
- Laps: 40

Winner
No. 11	Elliott Sadler	Joe Gibbs Racing

Television in the United States
- Network: ESPN
- Announcers: Allen Bestwick, Rusty Wallace, Andy Petree

Radio in the United States
- Radio: Motor Racing Network

The 2014 Aaron's 312 was the ninth car race of the 2014 NASCAR Nationwide Series season, and the 23rd iteration of the event. The race was held on Saturday, May 3, 2014, Lincoln, Alabama, at Talladega Superspeedway, a 2.66-mile (4.28 km) permanent triangle-shaped superspeedway. The race took the scheduled 117 laps to complete. On the final restart with three to go, Joe Gibbs Racing driver Elliott Sadler would manage to hold off the field to take home his 10th career NASCAR Nationwide Series series victory and his only victory of the season. To fill out the podium, Roush Fenway Racing driver Chris Buescher and JR Motorsports driver Regan Smith would finish second and third, respectively.

== Background ==
The layout of Talladega Superspeedway, the venue where the race was held.

Talladega Superspeedway, originally known as Alabama International Motor Superspeedway (AIMS), is a motorsports complex located north of Talladega, Alabama. It is located on the former Anniston Air Force Base in the small city of Lincoln. The track is a tri-oval and was constructed in the 1960s by the International Speedway Corporation, a business controlled by the France family. Talladega is most known for its steep banking and the unique location of the start/finish line that's located just past the exit to pit road. The track currently hosts the NASCAR series such as the NASCAR Cup Series, Xfinity Series and the Camping World Truck Series. Talladega is the longest NASCAR oval with a length of 2.66-mile-long (4.28 km) tri-oval like the Daytona International Speedway, which also is a 2.5-mile-long (4 km) tri-oval.

=== Entry list ===
- (R) denotes rookie driver.
- (i) denotes driver who is ineligible for series driver points.

#	Driver	Team	Make	Sponsor
01	Landon Cassill	JD Motorsports	Chevrolet	Flex Seal
2	Brian Scott	Richard Childress Racing	Chevrolet	Shore Lodge
3	Ty Dillon (R)	Richard Childress Racing	Chevrolet	Bass Pro Shops, Tracker Boats
4	Jeffrey Earnhardt	JD Motorsports	Chevrolet	FW1 Wash & Wax
5	Kasey Kahne (i)	JR Motorsports	Chevrolet	Great Clips
6	Trevor Bayne	Roush Fenway Racing	Ford	AdvoCare
7	Regan Smith	JR Motorsports	Chevrolet	Ragú
9	Chase Elliott (R)	JR Motorsports	Chevrolet	NAPA Auto Parts
10	Blake Koch	TriStar Motorsports	Toyota	SupportMilitary.org
11	Elliott Sadler	Joe Gibbs Racing	Toyota	OneMain Financial
14	Eric McClure	TriStar Motorsports	Toyota	Hefty Ultimate
16	Ryan Reed (R)	Roush Fenway Racing	Ford	Lilly Diabetes
17	Tanner Berryhill (R)	Vision Racing	Dodge	National Cash Lenders
19	Mike Bliss	TriStar Motorsports	Toyota	TriStar Motorsports
20	Bubba Wallace (i)	Joe Gibbs Racing	Toyota	ToyotaCare
22	Ryan Blaney (i)	Team Penske	Ford	Discount Tire
23	Robert Richardson Jr.	R3 Motorsports	Chevrolet	Corn Board
25	John Wes Townley (i)	Athenian Motorsports	Toyota	Zaxby's
28	J. J. Yeley	JGL Racing	Dodge	JGL Racing
31	Dylan Kwasniewski (R)	Turner Scott Motorsports	Chevrolet	Rockstar, AccuDoc Solutions
39	Ryan Sieg (R)	RSS Racing	Chevrolet	RSS Racing
40	Josh Wise (i)	The Motorsports Group	Chevrolet	The Motorsports Group
42	Kyle Larson (i)	Turner Scott Motorsports	Chevrolet	Cartwheel by Target
43	Dakoda Armstrong (R)	Richard Petty Motorsports	Ford	WinField United
44	David Starr	TriStar Motorsports	Toyota	Steely Lumber Company
46	Matt DiBenedetto	The Motorsports Group	Chevrolet	The Motorsports Group
51	Jeremy Clements	Jeremy Clements Racing	Chevrolet	BRT Extrusions, All South Electric
52	Joey Gase	Jimmy Means Racing	Chevrolet	Donate Life Mississippi
54	Sam Hornish Jr.	Joe Gibbs Racing	Toyota	Monster Energy
55	Jamie Dick	Viva Motorsports	Chevrolet	Viva Motorsports
60	Chris Buescher (R)	Roush Fenway Racing	Ford	Roush Performance
62	Brendan Gaughan	Richard Childress Racing	Chevrolet	South Point Hotel, Casino & Spa
70	Derrike Cope	Derrike Cope Racing	Chevrolet	Youtheory
74	Mike Harmon	Mike Harmon Racing	Dodge	WCI Parts
76	Tommy Joe Martins (R)	Martins Motorsports	Dodge	Diamond Gusset Jeans, Land No Tax
84	Chad Boat (R)	Billy Boat Motorsports	Chevrolet	Billy Boat Motorsports
85	Bobby Gerhart	Bobby Gerhart Racing	Chevrolet	Lucas Oil
87	Joe Nemechek (i)	NEMCO-Jay Robinson Racing	Toyota	Smoke 'n Sear
91	Jeff Green	TriStar Motorsports	Toyota	TriStar Motorsports
93	Carl Long	JGL Racing	Dodge	JGL Racing
98	David Ragan (i)	Biagi-DenBeste Racing	Ford	Carroll Shelby Engine Company
99	James Buescher	RAB Racing	Toyota	Rheem
Official entry list

== Practice ==
=== First practice ===
The first practice session was held on Thursday, May 1, at 2:00 p.m. CST. The session would last for one hour. Trevor Bayne, driving for Roush Fenway Racing, would set the fastest time in the session, with a lap of 50.300 and an average speed of 190.378 miles per hour (306.384 km/h).

Pos.	#	Driver	Team	Make	Time	Speed
1	6	Trevor Bayne	Roush Fenway Racing	Ford	50.300	190.378
2	60	Chris Buescher (R)	Roush Fenway Racing	Ford	50.302	190.370
3	16	Ryan Reed (R)	Roush Fenway Racing	Ford	50.303	190.366
Full first practice results

=== Final practice ===
The final practice session, sometimes referred to as Happy Hour, was held on Thursday, May 1, at 3:30 p.m. CST. The session would last for one hour and 30 minutes. Tommy Joe Martins, driving for Martins Motorsports, would set the fastest time in the session, with a lap of 51.514 and an average speed of 185.891 miles per hour (299.163 km/h).

Pos.	#	Driver	Team	Make	Time	Speed
1	76	Tommy Joe Martins (R)	Martins Motorsports	Dodge	51.514	185.891
2	4	Jeffrey Earnhardt	JD Motorsports	Chevrolet	51.518	185.877
3	42	Kyle Larson (i)	Turner Scott Motorsports	Chevrolet	51.533	185.823
Full Happy Hour practice results

== Qualifying ==
Qualifying was held on Friday, May 2, at 5:40 p.m. CST. Since Talladega Superspeedway is at least 1.25 miles (2.01 km) in length, the qualifying system was a multi-car system that included three rounds. The first round was 25 minutes, where every driver would be able to set a lap within the 25 minutes. Then, the second round would consist of the fastest 24 cars in Round 1, and drivers would have 10 minutes to set a lap. Round 3 consisted of the fastest 12 drivers from Round 2, and the drivers would have 5 minutes to set a time. Whoever was fastest in Round 3 would win the pole.

Sam Hornish Jr., driving for Joe Gibbs Racing, would win the pole after setting a time of 51.268 and an average speed of 186.783 mph (300.598 km/h) in the third round.

Two drivers would fail to qualify: Chad Boat and Derrike Cope.

=== Full qualifying results ===
Pos.	#	Driver	Team	Make	Time (R1)	Speed (R1)	Time (R2)	Speed (R2)	Time (R3)	Speed (R3)
1	54	Sam Hornish Jr.	Joe Gibbs Racing	Toyota	-*	-*	-*	-*	51.268	186.783
2	11	Elliott Sadler	Joe Gibbs Racing	Toyota	-*	-*	-*	-*	51.270	186.776
3	20	Bubba Wallace (i)	Joe Gibbs Racing	Toyota	-*	-*	-*	-*	51.283	186.729
4	16	Ryan Reed (R)	Roush Fenway Racing	Ford	-*	-*	-*	-*	52.021	184.080
5	43	Dakoda Armstrong (R)	Richard Petty Motorsports	Ford	-*	-*	-*	-*	52.044	183.998
6	22	Ryan Blaney (i)	Team Penske	Ford	-*	-*	-*	-*	52.202	183.441
7	3	Ty Dillon (R)	Richard Childress Racing	Chevrolet	-*	-*	-*	-*	52.253	183.262
8	60	Chris Buescher (R)	Roush Fenway Racing	Ford	-*	-*	-*	-*	52.326	183.007
9	99	James Buescher	RAB Racing	Toyota	-*	-*	-*	-*	52.369	182.856
10	2	Brian Scott	Richard Childress Racing	Chevrolet	-*	-*	-*	-*	52.400	182.748
11	62	Brendan Gaughan	Richard Childress Racing	Chevrolet	-*	-*	-*	-*	52.524	182.317
12	01	Landon Cassill	JD Motorsports	Chevrolet	-*	-*	-*	-*	52.561	182.188
Eliminated in Round 2
13	98	David Ragan (i)	Biagi-DenBeste Racing	Ford	-*	-*	51.306	186.645	-	-
14	10	Blake Koch	TriStar Motorsports	Toyota	-*	-*	51.531	185.830	-	-
15	25	John Wes Townley (i)	Athenian Motorsports	Toyota	-*	-*	51.550	185.761	-	-
16	44	David Starr	TriStar Motorsports	Toyota	-*	-*	51.577	185.664	-	-
17	55	Jamie Dick	Viva Motorsports	Chevrolet	-*	-*	51.584	185.639	-	-
18	14	Eric McClure	TriStar Motorsports	Toyota	-*	-*	51.588	185.625	-	-
19	19	Mike Bliss	TriStar Motorsports	Toyota	-*	-*	51.617	185.520	-	-
20	42	Kyle Larson (i)	Turner Scott Motorsports	Chevrolet	-*	-*	51.914	184.459	-	-
21	6	Trevor Bayne	Roush Fenway Racing	Ford	-*	-*	51.929	184.406	-	-
22	23	Robert Richardson Jr.	R3 Motorsports	Chevrolet	-*	-*	55.153	173.626	-	-
23	46	Matt DiBenedetto	The Motorsports Group	Chevrolet	50.435	189.868	-	-	-	-
24	40	Josh Wise (i)	The Motorsports Group	Chevrolet	51.061	187.540	-	-	-	-
Eliminated in Round 1
25	91	Jeff Green	TriStar Motorsports	Toyota	51.147	187.225	-	-	-	-
26	74	Mike Harmon	Mike Harmon Racing	Dodge	51.259	186.816	-	-	-	-
27	39	Ryan Sieg (R)	RSS Racing	Chevrolet	51.336	186.536	-	-	-	-
28	31	Dylan Kwasniewski (R)	Turner Scott Motorsports	Chevrolet	51.345	186.503	-	-	-	-
29	76	Tommy Joe Martins (R)	Martins Motorsports	Dodge	51.355	186.467	-	-	-	-
30	85	Bobby Gerhart	Bobby Gerhart Racing	Chevrolet	51.355	186.467	-	-	-	-
31	5	Kasey Kahne (i)	JR Motorsports	Chevrolet	51.680	185.294	-	-	-	-
32	7	Regan Smith	JR Motorsports	Chevrolet	51.695	185.240	-	-	-	-
33	51	Jeremy Clements	Jeremy Clements Racing	Chevrolet	52.139	183.663	-	-	-	-
34	28	J. J. Yeley	JGL Racing	Dodge	52.185	183.501	-	-	-	-
35	93	Carl Long	JGL Racing	Dodge	52.430	182.644	-	-	-	-
36	52	Joey Gase	Jimmy Means Racing	Chevrolet	52.625	181.967	-	-	-	-
Qualified by owner's points
37	9	Chase Elliott (R)	JR Motorsports	Chevrolet	52.666	181.825	-	-	-	-
38	87	Joe Nemechek (i)	NEMCO-Jay Robinson Racing	Toyota	53.732	178.218	-	-	-	-
39	4	Jeffrey Earnhardt	JD Motorsports	Chevrolet	57.580	166.308	-	-	-	-
Last car to qualify on time
40	17	Tanner Berryhill (R)	Vision Racing	Chevrolet	51.624	185.495	-	-	-	-
Failed to qualify
41	84	Chad Boat (R)	Billy Boat Motorsports	Chevrolet	51.696	185.237	-	-	-	-
42	70	Derrike Cope	Derrike Cope Racing	Chevrolet	51.941	184.363	-	-	-	-
Official starting lineup

*Time not available.

== Race results ==
Fin	St	#	Driver	Team	Make	Laps	Led	Status	Pts	Winnings
1	2	11	Elliott Sadler	Joe Gibbs Racing	Toyota	117	40	running	48	$58,020
2	8	60	Chris Buescher (R)	Roush Fenway Racing	Ford	117	1	running	43	$48,925
3	32	7	Regan Smith	JR Motorsports	Chevrolet	117	20	running	42	$35,675
4	13	98	David Ragan (i)	Biagi-DenBeste Racing	Ford	117	0	running	0	$26,025
5	1	54	Sam Hornish Jr.	Joe Gibbs Racing	Toyota	117	0	running	39	$35,900
6	38	87	Joe Nemechek (i)	NEMCO-Jay Robinson Racing	Toyota	117	0	running	0	$27,825
7	34	28	J. J. Yeley	JGL Racing	Dodge	117	1	running	38	$26,625
8	12	01	Landon Cassill	JD Motorsports	Chevrolet	117	0	running	36	$25,975
9	16	44	David Starr	TriStar Motorsports	Toyota	117	5	running	36	$25,350
10	21	6	Trevor Bayne	Roush Fenway Racing	Ford	117	0	running	34	$26,475
11	36	52	Joey Gase	Jimmy Means Racing	Chevrolet	117	1	running	34	$25,100
12	19	19	Mike Bliss	TriStar Motorsports	Toyota	117	0	running	32	$24,975
13	15	25	John Wes Townley (i)	Athenian Motorsports	Toyota	117	0	running	0	$18,800
14	29	76	Tommy Joe Martins (R)	Martins Motorsports	Dodge	117	0	running	30	$18,625
15	7	3	Ty Dillon (R)	Richard Childress Racing	Chevrolet	117	3	running	30	$25,150
16	39	4	Jeffrey Earnhardt	JD Motorsports	Chevrolet	117	0	running	28	$24,575
17	18	14	Eric McClure	TriStar Motorsports	Toyota	117	0	running	27	$24,250
18	5	43	Dakoda Armstrong (R)	Richard Petty Motorsports	Ford	117	0	running	26	$24,325
19	37	9	Chase Elliott (R)	JR Motorsports	Chevrolet	117	3	running	26	$23,975
20	27	39	Ryan Sieg (R)	RSS Racing	Chevrolet	117	0	running	24	$24,550
21	6	22	Ryan Blaney (i)	Team Penske	Ford	116	2	running	0	$23,850
22	31	5	Kasey Kahne (i)	JR Motorsports	Chevrolet	111	0	crash	0	$17,520
23	33	51	Jeremy Clements	Jeremy Clements Racing	Chevrolet	111	1	crash	22	$23,370
24	4	16	Ryan Reed (R)	Roush Fenway Racing	Ford	108	29	running	21	$25,670
25	40	17	Chad Boat (R)	Vision Racing	Chevrolet	107	0	crash	19	$23,570
26	24	40	Josh Wise (i)	The Motorsports Group	Chevrolet	91	0	engine	0	$22,920
27	17	55	Jamie Dick	Viva Motorsports	Chevrolet	87	0	running	17	$22,795
28	26	74	Mike Harmon	Mike Harmon Racing	Dodge	86	0	crash	16	$16,670
29	9	99	James Buescher	RAB Racing	Toyota	86	0	running	15	$22,520
30	20	42	Kyle Larson (i)	Turner Scott Motorsports	Chevrolet	78	0	running	0	$16,595
31	3	20	Bubba Wallace (i)	Joe Gibbs Racing	Toyota	74	0	running	0	$22,595
32	22	23	Robert Richardson Jr.	R3 Motorsports	Chevrolet	63	0	engine	12	$22,170
33	10	2	Brian Scott	Richard Childress Racing	Chevrolet	61	10	crash	12	$22,135
34	11	62	Brendan Gaughan	Richard Childress Racing	Chevrolet	61	1	crash	11	$22,100
35	28	31	Dylan Kwasniewski (R)	Turner Scott Motorsports	Chevrolet	43	0	crash	9	$22,055
36	30	85	Bobby Gerhart	Bobby Gerhart Racing	Chevrolet	31	0	engine	8	$14,730
37	35	93	Carl Long	JGL Racing	Dodge	14	0	electrical	7	$20,695
38	25	91	Jeff Green	TriStar Motorsports	Toyota	4	0	vibration	6	$14,661
39	23	46	Matt DiBenedetto	The Motorsports Group	Chevrolet	3	0	vibration	5	$14,525
40	14	10	Blake Koch	TriStar Motorsports	Toyota	1	0	vibration	4	$14,425
Failed to qualify
41		84	Chad Boat (R)	Billy Boat Motorsports	Chevrolet					
42		70	Derrike Cope	Derrike Cope Racing	Chevrolet					
Official race results

== Standings after the race ==
Drivers' Championship standings

	Pos	Driver	Points
	1	Chase Elliott	339
1	2	Elliott Sadler	338 (-1)
1	3	Regan Smith	336 (-3)
1	4	Trevor Bayne	308 (–31)
1	5	Ty Dillon	308 (–31)
	6	Brian Scott	277 (–62)
	7	Brendan Gaughan	250 (–89)
	8	James Buescher	244 (–95)
5	9	Chris Buescher	229 (–110)
	10	Ryan Reed	225 (–114)
Official driver's standings

- Note: Only the first 10 positions are included for the driver standings.

Previous race: 2014 ToyotaCare 250	NASCAR Nationwide Series; 2014 season	Next race: 2014 Get To Know Newton 250
