= 2014 Get To Know Newton 250 =

Tenth race of the 2014 NASCAR Nationwide Series

2014 Get To Know Newton 250 presented by Sherwin-Williams
Race details
- Race 10 of 33 of the 2014 NASCAR Nationwide Series
- Date: May 18, 2014
- Official name: 4th Annual Get To Know Newton 250 presented by Sherwin-Williams
- Location: Newton, Iowa, Iowa Speedway
- Course: Permanent racing facility
- Course length: 0.875 miles (4.0 km)
- Distance: 250 laps, 218.75 mi (352.04 km)
- Scheduled distance: 250 laps, 218.75 mi (352.04 km)
- Average speed: 105.45 miles per hour (169.71 km/h)

Pole position
Driver	Ryan Blaney	Team Penske
- Time: 23.148

Most laps led
Driver	Sam Hornish Jr.	Joe Gibbs Racing
- Laps: 167

Winner
No. 54	Sam Hornish Jr.	Joe Gibbs Racing

Television in the United States
- Network: ESPN
- Announcers: Dave Burns, Dale Jarrett, Andy Petree

Radio in the United States
- Radio: Motor Racing Network

The 2014 Get To Know Newton 250 presented by Sherwin-Williams was the tenth stock car race of the 2014 NASCAR Nationwide Series season, and the fourth iteration of the event. The race was held on Sunday, May 18, 2014, in Newton, Iowa at Iowa Speedway, a 7/8 mile (1.4 km) permanent D-shaped oval racetrack. On the final restart with 21 to go, Joe Gibbs Racing driver Sam Hornish Jr. would manage to hold off the field to win his third career NASCAR Nationwide Series victory and his only win of the season. To fill out the podium, Team Penske driver Ryan Blaney and JR Motorsports driver Regan Smith would finish second and third, respectively.

== Background ==
The race was held at Iowa Speedway, which is a 7/8-mile (1.4 km) paved oval motor racing track in Newton, Iowa, United States, approximately 30 miles (48 km) east of Des Moines. It has over 25,000 permanent seats as well as a unique multi-tiered RV viewing area along the backstretch.

=== Entry list ===
- (R) denotes rookie driver.
- (i) denotes driver who is ineligible for series driver points.

#	Driver	Team	Make	Sponsor
01	Landon Cassill	JD Motorsports	Chevrolet	G&K Services
2	Brian Scott	Richard Childress Racing	Chevrolet	Smokey Mountain Herbal Snuff
3	Ty Dillon (R)	Richard Childress Racing	Chevrolet	WESCO
4	Jeffrey Earnhardt	JD Motorsports	Chevrolet	Flex Seal
5	Austin Theriault	JR Motorsports	Chevrolet	Spy
6	Trevor Bayne	Roush Fenway Racing	Ford	AdvoCare
7	Regan Smith	JR Motorsports	Chevrolet	Great Clips
9	Chase Elliott (R)	JR Motorsports	Chevrolet	NAPA Auto Parts
10	Jeff Green	TriStar Motorsports	Toyota	SupportMilitary.org
11	Elliott Sadler	Joe Gibbs Racing	Toyota	OneMain Financial
14	Eric McClure	TriStar Motorsports	Toyota	Reynolds Wrap
16	Ryan Reed (R)	Roush Fenway Racing	Ford	Lilly Diabetes
17	Tanner Berryhill (R)	Vision Racing	Dodge	National Cash Lenders
19	Mike Bliss	TriStar Motorsports	Toyota	Tweaker Energy Shot
20	Michael McDowell (i)	Joe Gibbs Racing	Toyota	Pizza Ranch
22	Ryan Blaney (i)	Team Penske	Ford	Discount Tire
23	Carlos Contreras	Rick Ware Racing	Chevrolet	Voli Vodka
28	J. J. Yeley	JGL Racing	Dodge	JGL Racing
31	Chase Pistone (i)	Turner Scott Motorsports	Chevrolet	Turner Scott Motorsports
33	Cale Conley (i)	Richard Childress Racing	Chevrolet	Iraq & Afghanistan Veterans of America
39	Ryan Sieg (R)	RSS Racing	Chevrolet	RSS Racing
40	Matt DiBenedetto	The Motorsports Group	Chevrolet	The Motorsports Group
42	Dylan Kwasniewski (R)	Turner Scott Motorsports	Chevrolet	Up & Up
43	Dakoda Armstrong (R)	Richard Petty Motorsports	Ford	WinField United
44	Hal Martin	TriStar Motorsports	Toyota	American Custom Yachts
46	Ryan Ellis	The Motorsports Group	Chevrolet	The Motorsports Group
51	Jeremy Clements	Jeremy Clements Racing	Chevrolet	RepairableVehicles.com
52	Joey Gase	Jimmy Means Racing	Chevrolet	Donate Life Iowa
54	Sam Hornish Jr.	Joe Gibbs Racing	Toyota	Monster Energy
55	Caleb Roark (i)	Viva Motorsports	Chevrolet	Genmak Geneva-Liberty Steel
60	Chris Buescher (R)	Roush Fenway Racing	Ford	Ford EcoBoost
62	Brendan Gaughan	Richard Childress Racing	Chevrolet	South Point Hotel, Casino & Spa
70	Derrike Cope	Derrike Cope Racing	Chevrolet	Youtheory
74	Mike Harmon	Mike Harmon Racing	Dodge	Mike Harmon Racing
76	Tommy Joe Martins (R)	Martins Motorsports	Ford	Riessen Construction
84	Chad Boat (R)	Billy Boat Motorsports	Chevrolet	Billy Boat Motorsports
87	Tim Schendel	JD Motorsports	Chevrolet	JD Motorsports
93	Carl Long	JGL Racing	Dodge	JGL Racing
98	Ryan Gifford	Biagi-DenBeste Racing	Ford	Carroll Shelby Engine Company
99	James Buescher	RAB Racing	Toyota	Rheem
Official entry list

== Practice ==
=== First practice ===
The first practice session was held on Friday, May 16, at 9:00 AM CST. The session would last for three hours. Chase Elliott, driving for JR Motorsports, would set the fastest time in the session, with a lap of 23.387 and an average speed of 134.690 miles per hour (216.763 km/h).

Pos.	#	Driver	Team	Make	Time	Speed
1	9	Chase Elliott (R)	JR Motorsports	Chevrolet	23.387	134.690
2	2	Brian Scott	Richard Childress Racing	Chevrolet	23.412	134.546
3	54	Sam Hornish Jr.	Joe Gibbs Racing	Toyota	23.419	134.506
Full first practice results

=== Second practice ===
The second practice session was held on Friday, May 16, at 1:00 PM CST. The session would last for two hours. Brian Scott, driving for Richard Childress Racing, would set the fastest time in the session, with a lap of 23.366 and an average speed of 134.811 miles per hour (216.957 km/h).

Pos.	#	Driver	Team	Make	Time	Speed
1	2	Brian Scott	Richard Childress Racing	Chevrolet	23.366	134.811
2	9	Chase Elliott (R)	JR Motorsports	Chevrolet	23.393	134.656
3	11	Elliott Sadler	Joe Gibbs Racing	Toyota	23.490	134.100
Full second practice results

=== Third practice ===
The third practice session was held on Friday, May 16, at 3:30 PM CST. The session would last for one hour and 20 minutes. Chase Elliott, driving for JR Motorsports, would set the fastest time in the session, with a lap of 23.236 and an average speed of 135.566 miles per hour (218.172 km/h).

Pos.	#	Driver	Team	Make	Time	Speed
1	9	Chase Elliott (R)	JR Motorsports	Chevrolet	23.236	135.566
2	62	Brendan Gaughan	Richard Childress Racing	Chevrolet	23.476	134.180
3	20	Michael McDowell (i)	Joe Gibbs Racing	Toyota	23.517	133.946
Full third practice results

=== Final practice ===
The final practice session, sometimes referred to as Happy Hour, was held on Saturday, May 17, at 11:30 AM CST. The session would last for one hour and 30 minutes. Dylan Kwasniewski, driving for Turner Scott Motorsports, would set the fastest time in the session, with a lap of 23.320 and an average speed of 135.077 miles per hour (217.385 km/h).

Pos.	#	Driver	Team	Make	Time	Speed
1	42	Dylan Kwasniewski (R)	Turner Scott Motorsports	Chevrolet	23.320	135.077
2	3	Ty Dillon (R)	Richard Childress Racing	Chevrolet	23.492	134.088
3	5	Austin Theriault	JR Motorsports	Chevrolet	23.549	133.764
Full Happy Hour practice results

== Qualifying ==
Qualifying was held on Saturday, May 17, at 6:10 PM CST. Since Iowa Speedway is under 1.25 miles (2.01 km) in length, the qualifying system was a multi-car system that included two rounds. The first round was 30 minutes, where every driver would be able to set a lap within the 30 minutes. Then, the second round would consist of the fastest 12 drivers in round 1, and drivers would have 10 minutes to set a time. Whoever set the fastest time in round 2 would win the pole.

Ryan Blaney, driving for Team Penske, would win the pole, setting a time of 23.148 and an average speed of 136.081 miles per hour (219.001 km/h) in the second round.

No drivers would fail to qualify.

=== Full qualifying results ===
Pos.	#	Driver	Team	Make	Time (R1)	Speed (R1)	Time (R2)	Speed (R2)
1	22	Ryan Blaney (i)	Team Penske	Ford	-*	-*	23.148	136.081
2	54	Sam Hornish Jr.	Joe Gibbs Racing	Toyota	-*	-*	23.151	136.063
3	20	Michael McDowell (i)	Joe Gibbs Racing	Toyota	-*	-*	23.168	135.963
4	7	Regan Smith	JR Motorsports	Chevrolet	-*	-*	23.219	135.665
5	42	Dylan Kwasniewski (R)	Turner Scott Motorsports	Chevrolet	-*	-*	23.243	135.525
6	9	Chase Elliott (R)	JR Motorsports	Chevrolet	-*	-*	23.258	135.437
7	2	Brian Scott	Richard Childress Racing	Chevrolet	-*	-*	23.303	135.176
8	11	Elliott Sadler	Joe Gibbs Racing	Toyota	-*	-*	23.309	135.141
9	01	Landon Cassill	JD Motorsports	Chevrolet	-*	-*	23.319	135.083
10	62	Brendan Gaughan	Richard Childress Racing	Chevrolet	-*	-*	23.443	134.368
11	60	Chris Buescher (R)	Roush Fenway Racing	Ford	-*	-*	23.469	134.220
12	31	Chase Pistone (i)	Turner Scott Motorsports	Chevrolet	-*	-*	23.620	133.362
Eliminated in Round 1
13	3	Ty Dillon (R)	Richard Childress Racing	Chevrolet	23.471	134.208	-	-
14	99	James Buescher	RAB Racing	Toyota	23.494	134.077	-	-
15	16	Ryan Reed (R)	Roush Fenway Racing	Ford	23.504	134.020	-	-
16	6	Trevor Bayne	Roush Fenway Racing	Ford	23.514	133.963	-	-
17	5	Austin Theriault	JR Motorsports	Chevrolet	23.531	133.866	-	-
18	39	Ryan Sieg (R)	RSS Racing	Chevrolet	23.547	133.775	-	-
19	19	Mike Bliss	TriStar Motorsports	Toyota	23.648	133.204	-	-
20	84	Chad Boat (R)	Billy Boat Motorsports	Chevrolet	23.703	132.895	-	-
21	33	Cale Conley (i)	Richard Childress Racing	Chevrolet	23.727	132.760	-	-
22	43	Dakoda Armstrong (R)	Richard Petty Motorsports	Ford	23.731	132.738	-	-
23	98	Ryan Gifford	Biagi-DenBeste Racing	Ford	23.740	132.687	-	-
24	28	J. J. Yeley	JGL Racing	Dodge	23.747	132.648	-	-
25	4	Jeffrey Earnhardt	JD Motorsports	Chevrolet	23.814	132.275	-	-
26	10	Jeff Green	TriStar Motorsports	Toyota	23.923	131.672	-	-
27	44	Hal Martin	TriStar Motorsports	Toyota	24.003	131.234	-	-
28	51	Jeremy Clements	Jeremy Clements Racing	Chevrolet	24.004	131.228	-	-
29	52	Joey Gase	Jimmy Means Racing	Chevrolet	24.019	131.146	-	-
30	40	Matt DiBenedetto	The Motorsports Group	Chevrolet	24.027	131.103	-	-
31	17	Tanner Berryhill (R)	Vision Racing	Dodge	24.077	130.830	-	-
32	14	Eric McClure	TriStar Motorsports	Toyota	24.092	130.749	-	-
33	70	Derrike Cope	Derrike Cope Racing	Chevrolet	24.199	130.171	-	-
34	76	Tommy Joe Martins (R)	Martins Motorsports	Ford	24.251	129.892	-	-
35	93	Carl Long	JGL Racing	Dodge	24.304	129.608	-	-
36	87	Tim Schendel	JD Motorsports	Chevrolet	24.466	128.750	-	-
37	23	Carlos Contreras	Rick Ware Racing	Chevrolet	24.467	128.745	-	-
38	55	Caleb Roark (i)	Viva Motorsports	Chevrolet	24.471	128.724	-	-
39	46	Ryan Ellis	The Motorsports Group	Chevrolet	24.930	126.354	-	-
40	74	Mike Harmon	Mike Harmon Racing	Dodge	25.465	123.699	-	-
Official starting lineup

== Race results ==
Fin	St	#	Driver	Team	Make	Laps	Led	Status	Pts	Winnings
1	2	54	Sam Hornish Jr.	Joe Gibbs Racing	Toyota	250	167	running	48	$80,700
2	1	22	Ryan Blaney (i)	Team Penske	Ford	250	80	running	0	$64,200
3	4	7	Regan Smith	JR Motorsports	Chevrolet	250	0	running	41	$49,800
4	6	9	Chase Elliott (R)	JR Motorsports	Chevrolet	250	0	running	40	$38,475
5	8	11	Elliott Sadler	Joe Gibbs Racing	Toyota	250	0	running	39	$32,975
6	7	2	Brian Scott	Richard Childress Racing	Chevrolet	250	0	running	38	$29,275
7	3	20	Michael McDowell (i)	Joe Gibbs Racing	Toyota	250	3	running	0	$27,935
8	13	3	Ty Dillon (R)	Richard Childress Racing	Chevrolet	250	0	running	36	$26,895
9	16	6	Trevor Bayne	Roush Fenway Racing	Ford	250	0	running	35	$27,875
10	9	01	Landon Cassill	JD Motorsports	Chevrolet	250	0	running	34	$26,150
11	5	42	Dylan Kwasniewski (R)	Turner Scott Motorsports	Chevrolet	250	0	running	33	$24,300
12	10	62	Brendan Gaughan	Richard Childress Racing	Chevrolet	250	0	running	32	$23,750
13	11	60	Chris Buescher (R)	Roush Fenway Racing	Ford	250	0	running	31	$23,225
14	12	31	Chase Pistone (i)	Turner Scott Motorsports	Chevrolet	250	0	running	0	$22,700
15	17	5	Austin Theriault	JR Motorsports	Chevrolet	250	0	running	29	$22,825
16	15	16	Ryan Reed (R)	Roush Fenway Racing	Ford	250	0	running	28	$22,225
17	18	39	Ryan Sieg (R)	RSS Racing	Chevrolet	250	0	running	27	$21,800
18	24	28	J. J. Yeley	JGL Racing	Dodge	250	0	running	26	$21,550
19	14	99	James Buescher	RAB Racing	Toyota	249	0	running	25	$21,325
20	23	98	Ryan Gifford	Biagi-DenBeste Racing	Ford	248	0	running	24	$15,800
21	22	43	Dakoda Armstrong (R)	Richard Petty Motorsports	Ford	248	0	running	23	$20,975
22	28	51	Jeremy Clements	Jeremy Clements Racing	Chevrolet	246	0	running	22	$20,845
23	25	4	Jeffrey Earnhardt	JD Motorsports	Chevrolet	245	0	running	21	$20,695
24	32	14	Eric McClure	TriStar Motorsports	Toyota	245	0	running	20	$20,545
25	30	40	Matt DiBenedetto	The Motorsports Group	Chevrolet	245	0	running	19	$20,570
26	27	44	Hal Martin	TriStar Motorsports	Toyota	243	0	running	18	$20,645
27	29	52	Joey Gase	Jimmy Means Racing	Chevrolet	242	0	running	17	$20,170
28	35	93	Carl Long	JGL Racing	Dodge	235	0	brakes	16	$20,020
29	20	84	Chad Boat (R)	Billy Boat Motorsports	Chevrolet	227	0	transmission	15	$13,895
30	21	33	Cale Conley (i)	Richard Childress Racing	Chevrolet	224	0	running	0	$14,070
31	19	19	Mike Bliss	TriStar Motorsports	Toyota	220	0	crash	13	$19,615
32	38	55	Caleb Roark (i)	Viva Motorsports	Chevrolet	175	0	vibration	0	$19,505
33	37	23	Carlos Contreras	Rick Ware Racing	Chevrolet	138	0	engine	11	$13,390
34	36	87	Tim Schendel	JD Motorsports	Chevrolet	131	0	vibration	10	$19,280
35	31	17	Tanner Berryhill (R)	Vision Racing	Dodge	80	0	clutch	9	$13,167
36	34	76	Tommy Joe Martins (R)	Martins Motorsports	Ford	63	0	ignition	8	$12,125
37	33	70	Derrike Cope	Derrike Cope Racing	Chevrolet	44	0	brakes	7	$12,015
38	40	74	Mike Harmon	Mike Harmon Racing	Dodge	8	0	electrical	6	$11,936
39	26	10	Jeff Green	TriStar Motorsports	Toyota	3	0	vibration	5	$11,745
40	39	46	Ryan Ellis	The Motorsports Group	Chevrolet	3	0	ignition	4	$11,630
Official race results

== Standings after the race ==
Drivers' Championship standings

	Pos	Driver	Points
	1	Chase Elliott	379
	2	Elliott Sadler	377 (-2)
	3	Regan Smith	377 (-2)
1	4	Ty Dillon	344 (–35)
1	5	Trevor Bayne	343 (–36)
	6	Brian Scott	315 (–64)
	7	Brendan Gaughan	282 (–97)
	8	James Buescher	269 (–110)
	9	Chris Buescher	260 (–119)
2	10	Landon Cassill	258 (–121)
Official driver's standings

- Note: Only the first 10 positions are included for the driver standings.

Previous race: 2014 Aaron's 312	NASCAR Nationwide Series; 2014 season	Next race: 2014 History 300
