= Voxer =

American software company

- Website type: Mobile voice communication
- Owner: VoxerNet LLC
- Creators: Tom Katis, Matt Ranney
- Website: Voxer.com
- Launched: 2007
- Current status: Active

Voxer is a Dallas-based mobile app development company best known for its free Voxer Walkie Talkie app for smartphones.

Founded by Tom Katis and Matt Ranney, Voxer Walkie Talkie is both a live "push-to-talk" system and a voice messaging system. Messages on Voxer are delivered live as they're being recorded and then delivered as a voice message as well. The app works on Android, Windows Phone and iOS operating systems. In April 2012, the company raised $30 million in venture financing from Institutional Venture Partners (IVP), Intel Capital and other angel investors.

== Development ==
Tom Katis co-founded Voxer (originally RebelVox) in 2007 after a tour of duty in Afghanistan as a Special Forces communications sergeant.

In an interview with TechCrunch, Katis stated that during an ambush in Afghanistan, he attempted to coordinate reinforcements and rescue from a medical team in the middle of a firefight. He sought a way to talk to all parties at the same time, but the government-issued walkie-talkies did not have the functionality.

== Voxer Walkie Talkie ==
In May 2011, the company launched Voxer Walkie-Talkie on IOS. By the end of the year, the app had reached #6 on the iTunes App Store for social networking apps in the United States. The free app utilizes a number of patents around its live voice service.

The app has been described "as being similar to the Nextel walkie-talkie phones, except it lets users listen to recorded messages and talk one-to-one with other users." The app also allows users to send text messages and photos and has a location feature that allows users to see the location of other users on a map.

In an interview with TechCrunch, Gustaf Alstromer, the company's head of growth, explained that users in Cleveland adopted the technology first, followed by users in other cities in the Midwestern United States. The company attributes its viral success to word of mouth and "a variety of best practices going for tracking clickthroughs, conversions, and overall usage, using third parties like Mixpanel as well as its in-house systems." As of April 2012, monthly, unique users numbered in the double-digit millions.

In a video interview with the Wall Street Journal and All Things Digital, Katis also claimed Voxer's widespread adoption was in part due to the company's cross platform roll out on iOS and Android. This cross platform functionality allows users on different operating systems to communicate using the app which created a viral loop.

At some point the company had users across the world with an especially high user base in the United States, Mexico, Canada, Germany, England, Saudi Arabia, Brazil and Asia. Voxer Walkie-Talkie was among the top 25 social networking apps in more than 60 markets, according to the app tracking website App Annie. The service works over WiFi, 3G, 4G, and EDGE.

As of April 2012, the company had 35 employees and was headquartered in Dallas.

Katis said that the next steps for Voxer are to continue to improve the app, roll out functionality on other platforms and to create an enterprise-level product with additional features and administrative rights that can be used for governments, hospitals, corporations and other large organizations.

In 2020, Voxer accused Meta of infringing on its patents and incorporating its technology into Facebook Live and Instagram Live. The lawsuit stated that during 2012 representatives of Voxer disclosed its patented technology to Meta Platforms during discussions of a collaboration. Voxer stated that Meta Platforms stopped the collaboration in 2013 and in 2015-2016 during the launch of Facebook live and Instagram live, misused their technology. A jury in a Texas federal court found that Meta infringed on two of Voxers patents, and ordered Meta to pay Voxer more than $174.5 million in royalty damages.

== Technology ==
Voxer was built using Node.js, Riak and Redis.

Matt Ranney, co-founder and chief technology officer of Voxer, said in an interview with The Register that his team first coded Voxer in C++ and then Python but each proved too rigid or slow for a VoIP app. Later the team switched to Node.js because Voxer Walkie Talkie requires low latency with a large number of open connections. "If you want to make something where the user gets a real-time update stream of some kind, you need to keep open a bunch of connections to the server. That's very expensive in, say, a PHP architecture. But in Node, it's nearly free. You can keep the connections open for a very long time, and the incremental cost per connection is very low."

== Venture Financing ==
Voxer raised its first external capital round in April 2012. Led by Institutional Venture Partners (IVP), Intel Capital, and angel investors including SV Angel, CrunchFund, Chris Dixon, Roger McNamee and other friends of Katis', Voxer raised over $30 million in financing. Katis said Voxer would use the new funding to continue to build out its engineering team.

== Popular culture ==
Hip-hop artist Soulja Boy and basketball player Kevin Durant talked about using the Voxer Walkie Talkie app. Additionally, singer Harry Styles has tweeted about the app.

In a 2012 New York Times article, columnist and TV host David Pogue noted that Voxer is "an ingenious crossbreed of text messages and phone calls".
