= Flex Seal =

Adhesive bonding company

Flex Seal products (Swift Response, LLC)

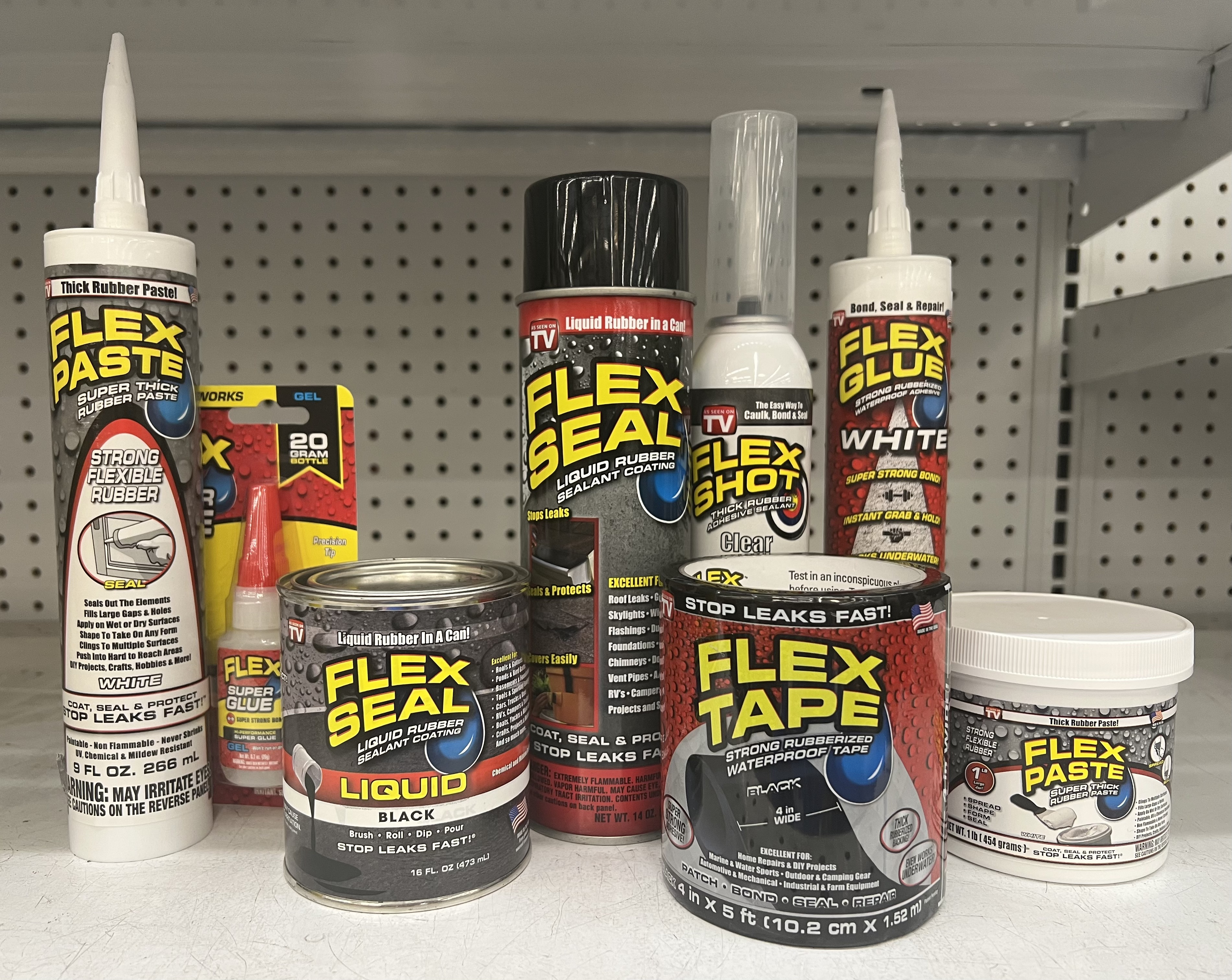
- Type: Private
- Industry: Chemical industry
- Founded: February 18, 2011; 15 years ago
- Headquarters: Weston, Florida, U.S.
- Area served: United States
- Key people: Philip Swift (CEO)
- Products: Flex Seal; Flex Seal Liquid; Flex Shot; Flex Tape; Flex Glue; Flex Minis; Foamazing; Slick Fix; Maximum Traction; Blast Off; Winter Wax; Flex Paste; Flex Tape Adhesive Remover; Flex Max; Flex Super Glue; Flex Seal Family Of Flooding Protection; Flex Duct Tape Super Wide; Flex Caulk; Power Putty; Flex Foam
- Number of employees: 100 (2019)
- Website: flexsealproducts.com

Flex Seal is an American brand of adhesive bonding products made by the family-owned company Swift Response in Weston, Florida. Founded on February 28, 2011, the company employs 100 people led by its pitchman and Chief Executive Officer Phil Swift. Flex Seal has become a popular internet meme due to its television advertisement demonstrations of the product in absurd and exaggerated situations, as well as Swift's enthusiasm and loud voice.

== Products ==
The brand includes a line of adhesive bonding products that are based around the concept of liquid rubber.

Flex Shot was released as an alternative to a caulk gun. Flex Tape was released as a waterproof tape. Flex Glue was released as a fix-all adhesive.

The company has also made several ancillary products over the years, including Block Out, Slick Fix, Maximum Traction, Foamazing, Blast Off and Winter Wax.

== Advertising ==
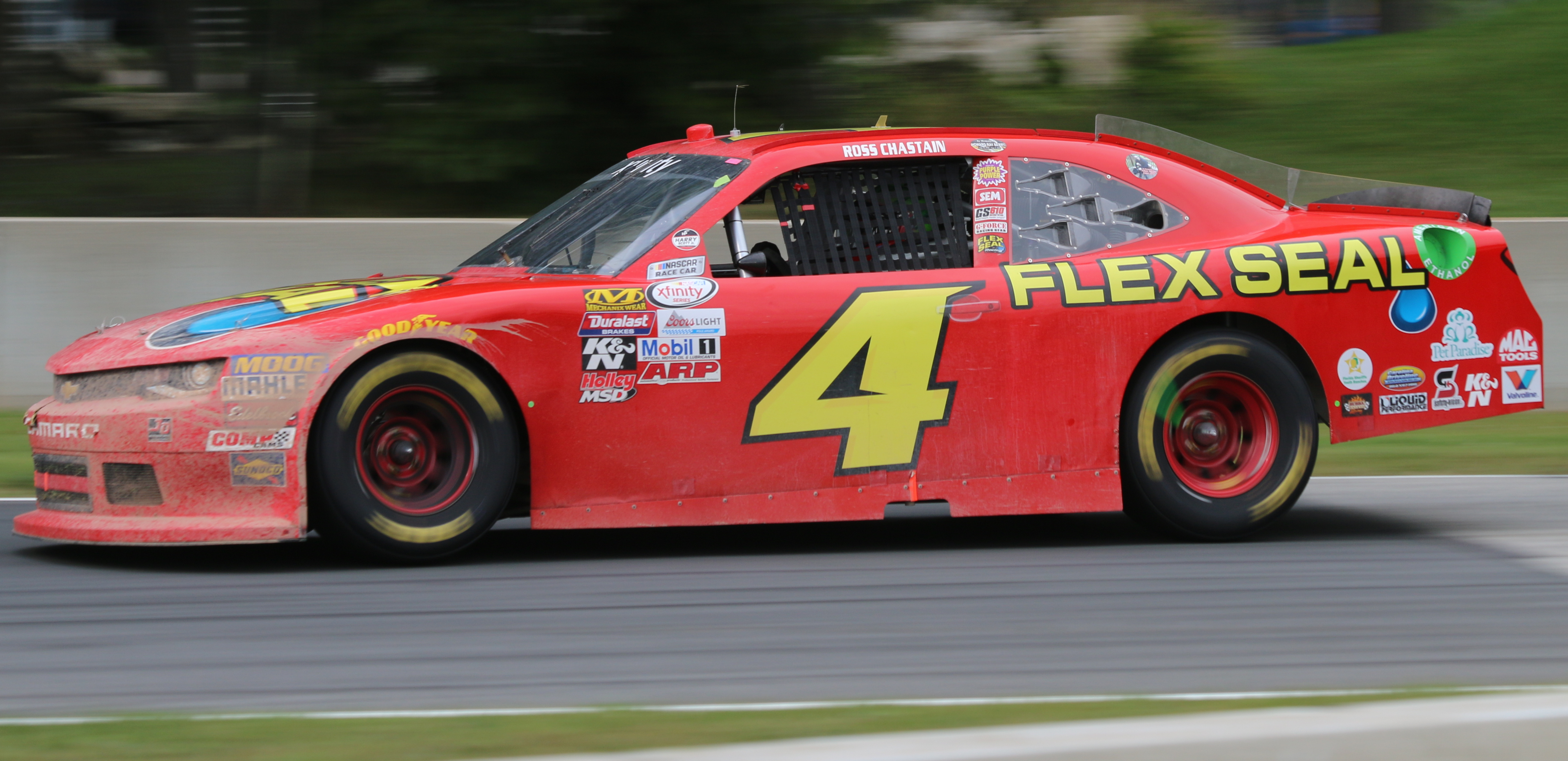
Ross Chastain driving a Flex Seal-sponsored NASCAR Xfinity Series car at Road America in 2017

Flex Seal has gained attention for its television advertising, including a popular advertisement where Phil Swift enthusiastically bisects a boat hull, repairs it with Flex Tape, and successfully sails it on a lake. A 2017 collaboration between Inside Edition, the Good Housekeeping Institute and a Lake Hopatcong marina recreated this experiment and found that although some water began to collect in the repaired boat, it "remained seaworthy" with a driver.

From 2013 to 2019, the company sponsored NASCAR Xfinity Series team JD Motorsports, sponsoring drivers who have included Ross Chastain, Landon Cassill, and Jeffrey Earnhardt. During one 2017 race, Flex Tape was used to repair crash damage on the car that the company sponsored, which was driven by Garrett Smithley.
