= 2013 History 300 =

10th race of the 2013 NASCAR Nationwide Series

Race details
- Race 10 of 33 of the 2013 NASCAR Nationwide Series
- Date: May 25, 2013
- Official name: 32nd Annual History 300
- Location: Concord, North Carolina, Charlotte Motor Speedway
- Course: Permanent racing facility
- Course length: 2.41 km (1.5 miles)
- Distance: 200 laps, 300 mi (482.803 km)
- Scheduled distance: 200 laps, 300 mi (482.803 km)
- Average speed: 129.917 miles per hour (209.081 km/h)

Pole position
Driver	Austin Dillon	Richard Childress Racing
- Time: 29.356

Most laps led
Driver	Kyle Busch	Joe Gibbs Racing
- Laps: 186

Winner
No. 54	Kyle Busch	Joe Gibbs Racing

Television in the United States
- Network: ABC
- Announcers: Allen Bestwick, Dale Jarrett, Andy Petree

Radio in the United States
- Radio: Performance Racing Network

The 2013 History 300 was the tenth stock car race of the 2013 NASCAR Nationwide Series and the 32nd iteration of the event. The race was held on Saturday, May 25, 2013, in Concord, North Carolina at Charlotte Motor Speedway, a 1.5 miles (2.4 km) permanent quad-oval. The race took the scheduled 200 laps to complete. At race's end, Kyle Busch, driving for Joe Gibbs Racing, would dominate the race to win his 57th career NASCAR Nationwide Series win, his sixth of the season, and his second consecutive win. To fill out the podium, Kasey Kahne of JR Motorsports and Joey Logano of Penske Racing would finish second and third, respectively.

== Background ==
The layout of Charlotte Motor Speedway, the venue where the race was held.

The race was held at Charlotte Motor Speedway, located in Concord, North Carolina. The speedway complex includes a 1.5-mile (2.4 km) quad-oval track that was utilized for the race, as well as a dragstrip and a dirt track. The speedway was built in 1959 by Bruton Smith and is considered the home track for NASCAR with many race teams based in the Charlotte metropolitan area. The track is owned and operated by Speedway Motorsports Inc. (SMI) with Marcus G. Smith serving as track president.

=== Entry list ===
#	Driver	Team	Make	Sponsor
00	Bryan Silas	SR² Motorsports	Toyota	Support Military
01	Mike Wallace	JD Motorsports	Chevrolet	QuikTrip
2	Brian Scott	Richard Childress Racing	Chevrolet	Shore Lodge
3	Austin Dillon	Richard Childress Racing	Chevrolet	AdvoCare
4	Landon Cassill	JD Motorsports	Chevrolet	Flex Seal Brite Patriotic
5	Kasey Kahne	JR Motorsports	Chevrolet	Great Clips
6	Trevor Bayne	Roush Fenway Racing	Ford	Pillow Pets
7	Regan Smith	JR Motorsports	Chevrolet	TaxSlayer Patriotic
10	Jeff Green*	TriStar Motorsports	Toyota	TriStar Motorsports
11	Elliott Sadler	Joe Gibbs Racing	Toyota	OneMain Financial
12	Sam Hornish Jr.	Penske Racing	Ford	Snap-on
14	Eric McClure	TriStar Motorsports	Toyota	Reynolds Wrap, Hefty
16	Chris Buescher	Roush Fenway Racing	Ford	Ford EcoBoost Patriotic
17	Tanner Berryhill	Vision Racing	Toyota	Keller Williams Realty
18	Matt Kenseth	Joe Gibbs Racing	Toyota	Reser's Fine Foods
19	Mike Bliss	TriStar Motorsports	Toyota	TriStar Motorsports
20	Brian Vickers	Joe Gibbs Racing	Toyota	Dollar General
21	Dakoda Armstrong	Richard Childress Racing	Chevrolet	WinField
22	Joey Logano	Penske Racing	Ford	Discount Tire Patriotic
23	Robert Richardson Jr.	R3 Motorsports	Chevrolet	North Texas Pipe
24	Jason White	SR² Motorsports	Toyota	JW Demolition
25	John Wes Townley	Venturini Motorsports	Toyota	Zaxby's
29	Kenny Wallace	RAB Racing	Toyota	ToyotaCare
30	Nelson Piquet Jr.	Turner Scott Motorsports	Chevrolet	Worx Yard Tools
31	Justin Allgaier	Turner Scott Motorsports	Chevrolet	Brandt Professional Agriculture
32	Kyle Larson	Turner Scott Motorsports	Chevrolet	Hulu Plus, Vizio
33	Kevin Harvick	Richard Childress Racing	Chevrolet	Hunt Brothers Pizza
37	Matt DiBenedetto	Vision Racing	Dodge	National Cash Lenders
40	Reed Sorenson	The Motorsports Group	Chevrolet	Swisher E-Cigarette
42	J. J. Yeley	The Motorsports Group	Chevrolet	The Motorsports Group
43	Michael Annett	Richard Petty Motorsports	Ford	EFS
44	Hal Martin	TriStar Motorsports	Toyota	American Custom Yachts
51	Jeremy Clements	Jeremy Clements Racing	Chevrolet	Jeremy Clements Racing
54	Kyle Busch	Joe Gibbs Racing	Toyota	Monster Energy
55	Jamie Dick	Viva Motorsports	Chevrolet	Viva Motorsports
60	Travis Pastrana	Roush Fenway Racing	Ford	Roush Fenway Racing Patriotic
66	Steve Wallace	Rusty Wallace Racing	Ford	Richard Tocado Mortgage
70	Johanna Long	ML Motorsports	Chevrolet	Wish for Our Heroes
74	Juan Carlos Blum	Mike Harmon Racing	Chevrolet	Oleofinos, Hahayoo
77	Parker Kligerman	Kyle Busch Motorsports	Toyota	Toyota Patriotic
79	Kyle Fowler	Go Green Racing	Ford	Koma Unwind, Town & Country Ford
87	Joe Nemechek	NEMCO Motorsports	Toyota	AM/FM Energy Wood & Pellet Stoves
92	Dexter Stacey	KH Motorsports	Ford	Maddie's Place Rocks
98	Kevin Swindell	Biagi-DenBeste Racing	Ford	Carroll Shelby Engine Co., DenBeste Water Solutions
99	Alex Bowman	RAB Racing	Toyota	Windows
Official entry list

== Practice ==
=== First practice/Open Test ===
The first practice, a four-hour test session, was held on Wednesday, May 22, at 12:00 PM EST. Joey Logano of Penske Racing would set the fastest time in the open test, with a lap of 30.295 and an average speed of 178.247 miles per hour (286.861 km/h).

Pos.	#	Driver	Team	Make	Time	Speed
1	22	Joey Logano	Penske Racing	Ford	30.295	178.247
2	99	Alex Bowman	RAB Racing	Toyota	30.325	178.071
3	54	Kyle Busch	Joe Gibbs Racing	Toyota	30.360	177.866
Full first practice results

=== Second practice ===
The second practice session was held on Thursday, May 23, at 1:00 PM EST, and would last for two hours and 20 minutes. Alex Bowman of RAB Racing would set the fastest time in the session, with a lap of 29.271 and an average speed of 184.483 miles per hour (296.897 km/h).

Pos.	#	Driver	Team	Make	Time	Speed
1	99	Alex Bowman	RAB Racing	Toyota	29.271	184.483
2	77	Parker Kligerman	Kyle Busch Motorsports	Toyota	29.281	184.420
3	12	Sam Hornish Jr.	Penske Racing	Ford	29.462	183.287
Full second practice results

=== Third and final practice ===
The third and final practice, sometimes known as Happy Hour, was held on Thursday, May 23, at 5:10 PM EST, and would last for one hour and 20 minutes. John Wes Townley of Venturini Motorsports would set the fastest time in the session, with a lap of 29.820 and an average speed of 181.087 miles per hour (291.431 km/h).

Pos.	#	Driver	Team	Make	Time	Speed
1	25	John Wes Townley	Venturini Motorsports	Toyota	29.820	181.087
2	29	Kenny Wallace	RAB Racing	Toyota	29.843	180.947
3	2	Brian Scott	Richard Childress Racing	Chevrolet	29.902	180.590
Full Happy Hour practice results

== Qualifying ==
Qualifying was held on Saturday, May 25, at 11:05 AM EST. Each driver would have two laps to set a fastest time; the fastest of the two would count as their official qualifying lap.

Austin Dillon of Richard Childress Racing would win the pole, setting a time of 29.356 and an average speed of 183.949 miles per hour (296.037 km/h).

Four drivers would fail to qualify: J. J. Yeley, Bryan Silas, Matt DiBenedetto, and Tanner Berryhill.

=== Full qualifying results ===
Pos.	#	Driver	Team	Make	Time	Speed
1	3	Austin Dillon	Richard Childress Racing	Chevrolet	29.356	183.949
2	54	Kyle Busch	Joe Gibbs Racing	Toyota	29.377	183.817
3	20	Brian Vickers	Joe Gibbs Racing	Toyota	29.488	183.125
4	2	Brian Scott	Richard Childress Racing	Chevrolet	29.528	182.877
5	77	Parker Kligerman	Kyle Busch Motorsports	Toyota	29.585	182.525
6	22	Joey Logano	Penske Racing	Ford	29.619	182.315
7	12	Sam Hornish Jr.	Penske Racing	Ford	29.653	182.106
8	99	Alex Bowman	RAB Racing	Toyota	29.657	182.082
9	18	Matt Kenseth	Joe Gibbs Racing	Toyota	29.659	182.070
10	7	Regan Smith	JR Motorsports	Chevrolet	29.695	181.849
11	5	Kasey Kahne	JR Motorsports	Chevrolet	29.723	181.677
12	16	Chris Buescher	Roush Fenway Racing	Ford	29.839	180.971
13	30	Nelson Piquet Jr.	Turner Scott Motorsports	Chevrolet	29.849	180.911
14	31	Justin Allgaier	Turner Scott Motorsports	Chevrolet	29.852	180.892
15	19	Mike Bliss	TriStar Motorsports	Toyota	29.859	180.850
16	33	Kevin Harvick	Richard Childress Racing	Chevrolet	29.892	180.650
17	98	Kevin Swindell	Biagi-DenBeste Racing	Ford	29.892	180.650
18	32	Kyle Larson	Turner Scott Motorsports	Chevrolet	29.907	180.560
19	21	Dakoda Armstrong	Richard Childress Racing	Chevrolet	29.932	180.409
20	11	Elliott Sadler	Joe Gibbs Racing	Toyota	29.960	180.240
21	6	Trevor Bayne	Roush Fenway Racing	Ford	29.960	180.240
22	51	Jeremy Clements	Jeremy Clements Racing	Chevrolet	29.964	180.216
23	55	Jamie Dick	Viva Motorsports	Chevrolet	30.092	179.450
24	4	Landon Cassill	JD Motorsports	Chevrolet	30.096	179.426
25	60	Travis Pastrana	Roush Fenway Racing	Ford	30.106	179.366
26	25	John Wes Townley	Venturini Motorsports	Toyota	30.159	179.051
27	29	Kenny Wallace	RAB Racing	Toyota	30.168	178.998
28	70	Johanna Long	ML Motorsports	Chevrolet	30.256	178.477
29	92	Dexter Stacey	KH Motorsports	Ford	30.324	178.077
30	79	Kyle Fowler	Go Green Racing	Ford	30.382	177.737
31	87	Joe Nemechek	NEMCO Motorsports	Toyota	30.398	177.643
32	14	Eric McClure	TriStar Motorsports	Toyota	30.428	177.468
33	43	Michael Annett	Richard Petty Motorsports	Ford	30.429	177.462
34	01	Mike Wallace	JD Motorsports	Chevrolet	30.451	177.334
35	74	Juan Carlos Blum	Mike Harmon Racing	Chevrolet	30.580	176.586
Qualified by owner's points
36	44	Hal Martin	TriStar Motorsports	Toyota	30.634	176.275
37	24	Jason White	SR² Motorsports	Toyota	30.659	176.131
38	40	Reed Sorenson	The Motorsports Group	Chevrolet	32.293	167.219
39	23	Robert Richardson Jr.	R3 Motorsports	Chevrolet	—	—
Last car to qualify on time
40	66	Steve Wallace	Rusty Wallace Racing	Ford	30.461	177.276
Failed to qualify or withdrew
41	42	J. J. Yeley	The Motorsports Group	Chevrolet	30.523	176.916
42	00	Bryan Silas	SR² Motorsports	Toyota	30.587	176.546
43	37	Matt DiBenedetto	Vision Racing	Dodge	30.612	176.401
44	17	Tanner Berryhill	Vision Racing	Toyota	33.077	163.255
WD	10	Jeff Green	TriStar Motorsports	Toyota	—	—
Official starting lineup

== Race results ==
Fin	St	#	Driver	Team	Make	Laps	Led	Status	Pts	Winnings
1	2	54	Kyle Busch	Joe Gibbs Racing	Toyota	200	186	running	0	$57,050
2	11	5	Kasey Kahne	JR Motorsports	Chevrolet	200	0	running	0	$40,950
3	6	22	Joey Logano	Penske Racing	Ford	200	0	running	0	$31,575
4	18	32	Kyle Larson	Turner Scott Motorsports	Chevrolet	200	0	running	40	$34,675
5	16	33	Kevin Harvick	Richard Childress Racing	Chevrolet	200	0	running	0	$22,925
6	21	6	Trevor Bayne	Roush Fenway Racing	Ford	200	0	running	38	$25,000
7	14	31	Justin Allgaier	Turner Scott Motorsports	Chevrolet	200	0	running	37	$23,875
8	9	18	Matt Kenseth	Joe Gibbs Racing	Toyota	200	0	running	0	$17,000
9	5	77	Parker Kligerman	Kyle Busch Motorsports	Toyota	200	0	running	35	$22,250
10	10	7	Regan Smith	JR Motorsports	Chevrolet	200	0	running	34	$22,650
11	3	20	Brian Vickers	Joe Gibbs Racing	Toyota	200	3	running	34	$21,025
12	7	12	Sam Hornish Jr.	Penske Racing	Ford	200	9	running	33	$20,375
13	20	11	Elliott Sadler	Joe Gibbs Racing	Toyota	200	0	running	31	$20,750
14	1	3	Austin Dillon	Richard Childress Racing	Chevrolet	200	1	running	31	$27,675
15	4	2	Brian Scott	Richard Childress Racing	Chevrolet	200	0	running	29	$20,180
16	13	30	Nelson Piquet Jr.	Turner Scott Motorsports	Chevrolet	200	0	running	28	$18,675
17	33	43	Michael Annett	Richard Petty Motorsports	Ford	200	0	running	27	$18,450
18	17	98	Kevin Swindell	Biagi-DenBeste Racing	Ford	200	1	running	27	$18,225
19	15	19	Mike Bliss	TriStar Motorsports	Toyota	200	0	running	25	$18,150
20	8	99	Alex Bowman	RAB Racing	Toyota	200	0	running	24	$18,550
21	24	4	Landon Cassill	JD Motorsports	Chevrolet	199	0	running	23	$12,125
22	22	51	Jeremy Clements	Jeremy Clements Racing	Chevrolet	198	0	running	22	$17,900
23	36	44	Hal Martin	TriStar Motorsports	Toyota	197	0	running	21	$17,850
24	34	01	Mike Wallace	JD Motorsports	Chevrolet	196	0	running	20	$17,785
25	40	66	Steve Wallace	Rusty Wallace Racing	Ford	196	0	running	19	$12,225
26	30	79	Kyle Fowler	Go Green Racing	Ford	196	0	running	18	$17,715
27	29	92	Dexter Stacey	KH Motorsports	Ford	194	0	running	17	$17,680
28	35	74	Juan Carlos Blum	Mike Harmon Racing	Chevrolet	194	0	running	16	$17,645
29	27	29	Kenny Wallace	RAB Racing	Toyota	188	0	running	15	$11,600
30	32	14	Eric McClure	TriStar Motorsports	Toyota	186	0	running	14	$17,855
31	19	21	Dakoda Armstrong	Richard Childress Racing	Chevrolet	183	0	crash	0	$11,520
32	31	87	Joe Nemechek	NEMCO Motorsports	Toyota	174	0	running	12	$17,475
33	25	60	Travis Pastrana	Roush Fenway Racing	Ford	163	0	crash	11	$17,430
34	23	55	Jamie Dick	Viva Motorsports	Chevrolet	162	0	electrical	10	$17,400
35	26	25	John Wes Townley	Venturini Motorsports	Toyota	160	0	crash	0	$11,369
36	28	70	Johanna Long	ML Motorsports	Chevrolet	155	0	running	8	$16,600
37	38	40	Reed Sorenson	The Motorsports Group	Chevrolet	146	0	engine	7	$16,575
38	12	16	Chris Buescher	Roush Fenway Racing	Ford	134	0	running	6	$16,556
39	37	24	Jason White	SR² Motorsports	Toyota	110	0	suspension	5	$16,435
40	39	23	Robert Richardson Jr.	R3 Motorsports	Chevrolet	45	0	crash	4	$16,330
Failed to qualify or withdrew
41		42	J. J. Yeley	The Motorsports Group	Chevrolet					
42		00	Bryan Silas	SR² Motorsports	Toyota					
43		37	Matt DiBenedetto	Vision Racing	Dodge					
44		17	Tanner Berryhill	Vision Racing	Toyota					
WD		10	Jeff Green	TriStar Motorsports	Toyota					
Official race results

Previous race: 2013 VFW Sport Clips Help a Hero 200	NASCAR Nationwide Series; 2013 season	Next race: 2013 5-hour Energy 200 (June)
