= 2013 Indiana 250 =

19th race of the 2013 NASCAR Nationwide Series

Race details
- Race 19 of 33 of the 2013 NASCAR Nationwide Series
- Date: July 27, 2013
- Official name: 2nd Annual Indiana 250
- Location: Speedway, Indiana, Indianapolis Motor Speedway
- Course: Permanent racing facility
- Course length: 4.0 km (2.5 miles)
- Distance: 100 laps, 250 mi (402.336 km)
- Scheduled distance: 100 laps, 250 mi (402.336 km)
- Average speed: 134.61 miles per hour (216.63 km/h)

Pole position
Driver	Kyle Busch	Joe Gibbs Racing
- Time: 50.099

Most laps led
Driver	Kyle Busch	Joe Gibbs Racing
- Laps: 92

Winner
No. 54	Kyle Busch	Joe Gibbs Racing

Television in the United States
- Network: ESPN
- Announcers: Marty Reid, Dale Jarrett, Andy Petree

Radio in the United States
- Radio: Motor Racing Network

The 2013 Indiana 250 was the 19th stock car race of the 2013 NASCAR Nationwide Series and the second iteration of the event. The race was held on Saturday, July 27, 2013, in Speedway, Indiana, at the Indianapolis Motor Speedway, a 2.5 miles (4.0 km) permanent rectangular-shaped racetrack. The race took the scheduled 100 laps to complete. At race's end, Kyle Busch, driving for Joe Gibbs Racing, would dominate the weekend to win his 59th career NASCAR Nationwide Series win and his eighth of the season. To fill out the podium, Brian Scott of Richard Childress Racing and Joey Logano of Penske Racing would finish second and third, respectively.

== Background ==
The layout of the Indianapolis Motor Speedway, the venue where the race was held.

The Indianapolis Motor Speedway, located in Speedway, Indiana, (an enclave suburb of Indianapolis) in the United States, is the home of the Indianapolis 500 and the Brickyard 400. It is located on the corner of 16th Street and Georgetown Road, approximately six miles (10 km) west of Downtown Indianapolis.

Constructed in 1909, it is the original speedway, the first racing facility so named. It has a permanent seating capacity estimated at 235,000 with infield seating raising capacity to an approximate 400,000. It is the highest-capacity sports venue in the world.

=== Entry list ===
- (R) denotes rookie driver.
- (i) denotes driver who is ineligible for series driver points.

#	Driver	Team	Make	Sponsor
00	David Green	SR² Motorsports	Toyota	SR² Motorsports
01	Mike Wallace	JD Motorsports	Chevrolet	JD Motorsports
2	Brian Scott	Richard Childress Racing	Chevrolet	Shore Lodge
3	Austin Dillon	Richard Childress Racing	Chevrolet	AdvoCare
4	Landon Cassill	JD Motorsports	Chevrolet	Flex Seal
5	Kasey Kahne (i)	JR Motorsports	Chevrolet	Great Clips Shark Week
6	Trevor Bayne	Roush Fenway Racing	Ford	Pillow Pets
7	Regan Smith	JR Motorsports	Chevrolet	TaxSlayer
10	Jeff Green	TriStar Motorsports	Toyota	TriStar Motorsports
11	Elliott Sadler	Joe Gibbs Racing	Toyota	OneMain Financial
12	Sam Hornish Jr.	Penske Racing	Ford	Würth
14	Eric McClure	TriStar Motorsports	Toyota	Reynolds Wrap, Hefty
17	Tanner Berryhill	Vision Racing	Toyota	National Cash Lenders
18	Matt Kenseth (i)	Joe Gibbs Racing	Toyota	GameStop, Tritton
19	Mike Bliss	TriStar Motorsports	Toyota	Tweaker Energy Shot
20	Brian Vickers	Joe Gibbs Racing	Toyota	Dollar General
21	Kevin Harvick (i)	Richard Childress Racing	Chevrolet	Hunt Brothers Pizza
22	Joey Logano (i)	Penske Racing	Ford	Discount Tire
23	Robert Richardson Jr.	R3 Motorsports	Chevrolet	Stalk It
24	Ken Butler III	SR² Motorsports	Toyota	M&W Transportation
30	Nelson Piquet Jr. (R)	Turner Scott Motorsports	Chevrolet	Worx Yard Tools
31	Justin Allgaier	Turner Scott Motorsports	Chevrolet	Charles Dean Leffler Discretionary Trust "LefTurn"
32	Kyle Larson (R)	Turner Scott Motorsports	Chevrolet	Cessna
33	Paul Menard (i)	Richard Childress Racing	Chevrolet	Menards, Rheem
37	Matt DiBenedetto	Vision Racing	Dodge	National Cash Lenders
39	Ryan Sieg (i)	RSS Racing	Chevrolet	Pull-A-Part
40	Reed Sorenson	The Motorsports Group	Chevrolet	Swisher E-Cigarette
42	Josh Wise	The Motorsports Group	Chevrolet	The Motorsports Group
43	Michael Annett	Richard Petty Motorsports	Ford	Pilot Travel Centers, Old Wisconsin
44	Cole Whitt	TriStar Motorsports	Toyota	Takagi Tankless Water Heaters
46	J. J. Yeley (i)	The Motorsports Group	Chevrolet	The Motorsports Group
51	Jeremy Clements	Jeremy Clements Racing	Chevrolet	RepairableVehicles.com
52	Joey Gase	Jimmy Means Racing	Toyota	Donate Life
54	Kyle Busch (i)	Joe Gibbs Racing	Toyota	Monster Energy
55	David Starr (i)	Viva Motorsports	Chevrolet	Striping Technology, Chasco Contractors
60	Travis Pastrana	Roush Fenway Racing	Ford	X Games Los Angeles
70	Johanna Long	ML Motorsports	Chevrolet	Wish for Our Heroes
74	Carl Long	Mike Harmon Racing	Chevrolet	HE-Adjusters.com, I-Car Gold Class
77	Parker Kligerman	Kyle Busch Motorsports	Toyota	Toyota
79	Kyle Fowler	Go Green Racing	Ford	Techniweld
87	Joe Nemechek	NEMCO Motorsports	Toyota	R.G.E. Manufacturing
89	Morgan Shepherd	Shepherd Racing Ventures	Chevrolet	Racing with Jesus
92	Dexter Stacey* (R)	KH Motorsports	Ford	Maddie's Place Rocks
98	Kevin Swindell (R)	Biagi-DenBeste Racing	Ford	Curb Records, LeAnn Rimes "Spitfire"
99	Alex Bowman (R)	RAB Racing	Toyota	Nationwide Children's Hospital
Official entry list

== Practice ==
=== First practice ===
The first practice session was held on Friday, July 26, at 8:30 AM, and would last for one hour and 30 minutes. Kyle Larson of Turner Scott Motorsports would set the fastest time in the session, with a lap of 50.763 and an average speed of 177.294 miles per hour (285.327 km/h).

Pos.	#	Driver	Team	Make	Time	Speed
1	32	Kyle Larson (R)	Turner Scott Motorsports	Chevrolet	50.763	177.294
2	2	Brian Scott	Richard Childress Racing	Chevrolet	50.856	176.970
3	20	Brian Vickers	Joe Gibbs Racing	Toyota	50.901	176.814
Full first practice results

=== Second and final practice ===
The second and final practice session, sometimes referred to as Happy Hour, was held on Saturday, July 20, at 10:30 AM EST, and would last for 55 minutes. Brian Vickers of Joe Gibbs Racing would set the fastest time in the session, with a lap of 50.603 and an average speed of 177.855 miles per hour (286.230 km/h).

Pos.	#	Driver	Team	Make	Time	Speed
1	20	Brian Vickers	Joe Gibbs Racing	Toyota	50.603	177.855
2	2	Brian Scott	Richard Childress Racing	Chevrolet	50.661	177.651
3	7	Regan Smith	JR Motorsports	Chevrolet	50.840	177.026
Full Happy Hour practice results

== Qualifying ==
Qualifying was held on Saturday, July 27, at 12:05 PM EST. Each driver would have two laps to set a fastest time; the fastest of the two would count as their official qualifying lap.

Kyle Busch of Joe Gibbs Racing would win the pole, setting a time of 50.099 and an average speed of 179.644 miles per hour (289.109 km/h).

Four drivers would fail to qualify: Matt DiBenedetto, Carl Long, Morgan Shepherd, and Joey Gase.

=== Full qualifying results ===
Pos.	#	Driver	Team	Make	Time	Speed
1	54	Kyle Busch (i)	Joe Gibbs Racing	Toyota	50.099	179.644
2	12	Sam Hornish Jr.	Penske Racing	Ford	50.288	178.969
3	6	Trevor Bayne	Roush Fenway Racing	Ford	50.457	178.370
4	11	Elliott Sadler	Joe Gibbs Racing	Toyota	50.562	177.999
5	77	Parker Kligerman	Kyle Busch Motorsports	Toyota	50.578	177.943
6	20	Brian Vickers	Joe Gibbs Racing	Toyota	50.622	177.788
7	3	Austin Dillon	Richard Childress Racing	Chevrolet	50.633	177.750
8	30	Nelson Piquet Jr. (R)	Turner Scott Motorsports	Chevrolet	50.647	177.701
9	18	Matt Kenseth (i)	Joe Gibbs Racing	Toyota	50.665	177.637
10	33	Paul Menard (i)	Richard Childress Racing	Chevrolet	50.687	177.560
11	2	Brian Scott	Richard Childress Racing	Chevrolet	50.699	177.518
12	5	Kasey Kahne (i)	JR Motorsports	Chevrolet	50.718	177.452
13	22	Joey Logano (i)	Penske Racing	Ford	50.725	177.427
14	31	Justin Allgaier	Turner Scott Motorsports	Chevrolet	50.844	177.012
15	21	Kevin Harvick (i)	Richard Childress Racing	Chevrolet	50.940	176.678
16	7	Regan Smith	JR Motorsports	Chevrolet	51.009	176.439
17	32	Kyle Larson (R)	Turner Scott Motorsports	Chevrolet	51.034	176.353
18	98	Kevin Swindell (R)	Biagi-DenBeste Racing	Ford	51.105	176.108
19	43	Michael Annett	Richard Childress Racing	Ford	51.146	175.967
20	55	David Starr (i)	Viva Motorsports	Chevrolet	51.533	174.645
21	19	Mike Bliss	TriStar Motorsports	Toyota	51.540	174.622
22	44	Cole Whitt	TriStar Motorsports	Toyota	51.569	174.523
23	79	Kyle Fowler	Go Green Racing	Ford	51.787	173.789
24	87	Joe Nemechek	NEMCO Motorsports	Toyota	51.848	173.584
25	39	Ryan Sieg (i)	RSS Racing	Chevrolet	51.911	173.374
26	70	Johanna Long	ML Motorsports	Chevrolet	52.216	172.361
27	17	Tanner Berryhill (i)	Vision Racing	Toyota	52.218	172.354
28	40	Reed Sorenson	The Motorsports Group	Chevrolet	52.263	172.206
29	4	Landon Cassill	JD Motorsports	Chevrolet	52.318	172.025
30	01	Mike Wallace	JD Motorsports	Chevrolet	52.348	171.926
31	51	Jeremy Clements	Jeremy Clements Racing	Chevrolet	52.536	171.311
32	42	Josh Wise	The Motorsports Group	Chevrolet	52.779	170.522
33	10	Jeff Green	TriStar Motorsports	Toyota	52.918	170.074
34	46	J. J. Yeley (i)	The Motorsports Group	Chevrolet	52.918	170.074
35	24	Ken Butler III	SR² Motorsports	Toyota	53.085	169.539
36	14	Eric McClure	TriStar Motorsports	Toyota	53.117	169.437
37	23	Robert Richardson Jr.	R3 Motorsports	Chevrolet	53.931	166.880
Qualified by owner's points
38	99	Alex Bowman (R)	RAB Racing	Toyota	—	—
39	60	Travis Pastrana	Roush Fenway Racing	Ford	—	—
Champion's Provisional
40	00	David Green	SR² Motorsports	Toyota	55.032	163.541
Failed to qualify
41	37	Matt DiBenedetto	Vision Racing	Dodge	53.096	169.504
42	74	Carl Long	Mike Harmon Racing	Chevrolet	53.835	167.177
43	89	Morgan Shepherd	Shepherd Racing Ventures	Chevrolet	53.980	166.728
44	52	Joey Gase	Jimmy Means Racing	Chevrolet	—	—
WD	92	Dexter Stacey (R)	KH Motorsports	Ford	—	—
Official starting lineup

== Race results ==
Fin	St	#	Driver	Team	Make	Laps	Led	Status	Pts	Winnings
1	1	54	Kyle Busch (i)	Joe Gibbs Racing	Toyota	100	92	running	0	$69,625
2	11	2	Brian Scott	Richard Childress Racing	Chevrolet	100	3	running	43	$58,444
3	13	22	Joey Logano (i)	Penske Racing	Ford	100	0	running	0	$40,050
4	6	20	Brian Vickers	Joe Gibbs Racing	Toyota	100	3	running	41	$141,453
5	15	21	Kevin Harvick (i)	Richard Childress Racing	Chevrolet	100	0	running	0	$31,575
6	10	33	Paul Menard (i)	Richard Childress Racing	Chevrolet	100	0	running	0	$28,000
7	9	18	Matt Kenseth (i)	Joe Gibbs Racing	Toyota	100	0	running	0	$26,575
8	18	98	Kevin Swindell (R)	Biagi-DenBeste Racing	Ford	100	0	running	36	$33,128
9	19	43	Michael Annett	Richard Childress Racing	Ford	100	0	running	35	$31,628
10	39	60	Travis Pastrana	Roush Fenway Racing	Ford	100	0	running	34	$31,603
11	17	32	Kyle Larson (R)	Turner Scott Motorsports	Chevrolet	100	0	running	33	$29,953
12	7	3	Austin Dillon	Richard Childress Racing	Chevrolet	100	0	running	32	$29,703
13	4	11	Elliott Sadler	Joe Gibbs Racing	Toyota	100	0	running	31	$30,428
14	8	30	Nelson Piquet Jr. (R)	Turner Scott Motorsports	Chevrolet	100	0	running	30	$29,078
15	38	99	Alex Bowman (R)	RAB Racing	Toyota	100	0	running	29	$29,828
16	3	6	Trevor Bayne	Roush Fenway Racing	Ford	100	2	running	29	$30,953
17	22	44	Cole Whitt	TriStar Motorsports	Toyota	100	0	running	27	$28,553
18	5	77	Parker Kligerman	Kyle Busch Motorsports	Toyota	100	0	running	26	$28,403
19	16	7	Regan Smith	JR Motorsports	Chevrolet	100	0	running	25	$28,203
20	23	79	Kyle Fowler	Go Green Racing	Ford	100	0	running	24	$28,753
21	20	55	David Starr (i)	Viva Motorsports	Chevrolet	100	0	running	0	$27,928
22	30	01	Mike Wallace	JD Motorsports	Chevrolet	100	0	running	22	$27,803
23	24	87	Joe Nemechek	NEMCO Motorsports	Toyota	100	0	running	21	$27,653
24	25	39	Ryan Sieg (i)	RSS Racing	Chevrolet	99	0	running	0	$21,100
25	29	4	Landon Cassill	JD Motorsports	Chevrolet	99	0	running	19	$27,953
26	12	5	Kasey Kahne (i)	JR Motorsports	Chevrolet	99	0	running	0	$20,975
27	26	70	Johanna Long	ML Motorsports	Chevrolet	98	0	running	17	$27,253
28	28	40	Reed Sorenson	The Motorsports Group	Chevrolet	98	0	running	16	$27,178
29	27	17	Tanner Berryhill (i)	Vision Racing	Toyota	98	0	running	0	$20,650
30	37	23	Robert Richardson Jr.	R3 Motorsports	Chevrolet	98	0	running	14	$27,303
31	36	14	Eric McClure	TriStar Motorsports	Toyota	95	0	running	13	$26,903
32	35	24	Ken Butler III	SR² Motorsports	Toyota	90	0	transmission	12	$26,778
33	14	31	Justin Allgaier	Turner Scott Motorsports	Chevrolet	81	0	running	11	$26,718
34	2	12	Sam Hornish Jr.	Penske Racing	Ford	64	0	overheating	10	$26,683
35	31	51	Jeremy Clements	Jeremy Clements Racing	Chevrolet	59	0	overheating	9	$26,617
36	21	19	Mike Bliss	TriStar Motorsports	Toyota	41	0	engine	8	$25,008
37	34	46	J. J. Yeley (i)	The Motorsports Group	Chevrolet	7	0	electrical	0	$18,545
38	40	00	David Green	SR² Motorsports	Toyota	6	0	transmission	6	$18,461
39	32	42	Josh Wise	The Motorsports Group	Chevrolet	6	0	rear gear	5	$18,300
40	33	10	Jeff Green	TriStar Motorsports	Toyota	4	0	vibration	4	$18,190
Failed to qualify or withdrew
41		37	Matt DiBenedetto	Vision Racing	Dodge					
42		74	Carl Long	Mike Harmon Racing	Chevrolet					
43		89	Morgan Shepherd	Shepherd Racing Ventures	Chevrolet					
44		52	Joey Gase	Jimmy Means Racing	Chevrolet					
WD		92	Dexter Stacey (R)	KH Motorsports	Ford					
Official race results

== Standings after the race ==
Drivers' Championship standings

Pos	Driver	Points
1	Austin Dillon	656
2	Regan Smith	650 (-6)
3	Elliott Sadler	643 (–13)
4	Sam Hornish Jr.	642 (–14)
5	Brian Vickers	628 (–28)
6	Justin Allgaier	621 (–35)
7	Kyle Larson	612 (–44)
8	Brian Scott	610 (–46)
9	Trevor Bayne	592 (–64)
10	Parker Kligerman	589 (–67)
11	Alex Bowman	516 (–140)
12	Nelson Piquet Jr.	507 (–149)
Official driver's standings

- Note: Only the first 12 positions are included for the driver standings.

Previous race: 2013 STP 300	NASCAR Nationwide Series; 2013 season	Next race: 2013 U.S. Cellular 250
