= 2013 Great Clips/Grit Chips 300 =

24th race of the 2013 NASCAR Nationwide Series

Race details
- Race 24 of 33 of the 2013 NASCAR Nationwide Series
- Date: August 31, 2013
- Official name: 22nd Annual Great Clips/Grit Chips 300
- Location: Hampton, Georgia, Atlanta Motor Speedway
- Course: Permanent racing facility
- Course length: 1.54 miles (2.48 km)
- Distance: 195 laps, 300.3 mi (483.286 km)
- Scheduled distance: 195 laps, 300.3 mi (483.286 km)
- Average speed: 140.747 miles per hour (226.510 km/h)

Pole position
Driver	Kyle Busch	Joe Gibbs Racing
- Time: 30.704

Most laps led
Driver	Kevin Harvick	Richard Childress Racing
- Laps: 132

Winner
No. 33	Kevin Harvick	Richard Childress Racing

Television in the United States
- Network: ESPN2
- Announcers: Allen Bestwick, Dale Jarrett, Andy Petree

Radio in the United States
- Radio: Performance Racing Network

The 2013 Great Clips/Grit Chips 300 was the 24th stock car race of the 2013 NASCAR Nationwide Series and the 22nd iteration of the event. The race was held on Saturday, August 31, 2013, in Hampton, Georgia at Atlanta Motor Speedway, a 1.54 miles (2.48 km) permanent asphalt quad-oval intermediate speedway. The race took the scheduled 195 laps to complete. At race's end, Kevin Harvick, driving for Richard Childress Racing, would manage to hold off eventual second-place finisher, Joe Gibbs Racing driver Kyle Busch, to win his 40th career NASCAR Nationwide Series win and his first and only win of the season. To fill out the podium, Sam Hornish Jr. of Penske Racing would finish third.

== Background ==
The layout of Atlanta Motor Speedway, the venue where the race was held.

Atlanta Motor Speedway (formerly Atlanta International Raceway) is a track in Hampton, Georgia, 20 miles (32 km) south of Atlanta. It is a 1.54-mile (2.48 km) quad-oval track with a seating capacity of 111,000. It opened in 1960 as a 1.5-mile (2.4 km) standard oval. In 1994, 46 condominiums were built over the northeastern side of the track. In 1997, to standardize the track with Speedway Motorsports' other two 1.5-mile (2.4 km) ovals, the entire track was almost completely rebuilt. The frontstretch and backstretch were swapped, and the configuration of the track was changed from oval to quad-oval. The project made the track one of the fastest on the NASCAR circuit.

=== Entry list ===
- (R) denotes rookie driver.
- (i) denotes driver who is ineligible for series driver points.

#	Driver	Team	Make	Sponsor
00	Blake Koch	SR² Motorsports	Toyota	SupportMilitary.org, M&W Transportation
01	Mike Wallace	JD Motorsports	Chevrolet	G&K Services
2	Brian Scott	Richard Childress Racing	Chevrolet	Armour Vienna Sausage
3	Austin Dillon	Richard Childress Racing	Chevrolet	AdvoCare Spark
4	Landon Cassill	JD Motorsports	Chevrolet	Line-K
5	Kasey Kahne (i)	JR Motorsports	Chevrolet	Great Clips
6	Trevor Bayne	Roush Fenway Racing	Ford	Sam's Club Angus Beef
7	Regan Smith	JR Motorsports	Chevrolet	TaxSlayer
10	Chase Miller	TriStar Motorsports	Toyota	TriStar Motorsports
11	Elliott Sadler	Joe Gibbs Racing	Toyota	OneMain Financial
12	Sam Hornish Jr.	Penske Racing	Ford	Alliance Truck Parts
14	Jeff Green	TriStar Motorsports	Toyota	Reynolds Wrap, Hefty
16	Chris Buescher	Roush Fenway Racing	Ford	Roush Fenway Racing Driven
17	Tanner Berryhill*	Vision Racing	Dodge	National Cash Lenders
19	Mike Bliss	TriStar Motorsports	Toyota	Reliable Heating & Air
20	Brian Vickers	Joe Gibbs Racing	Toyota	Dollar General
22	Brad Keselowski (i)	Penske Racing	Ford	Discount Tire
23	Robert Richardson Jr.	R3 Motorsports	Chevrolet	North Texas Pipe
24	Ken Butler III	SR² Motorsports	Toyota	RE/MAX of Georgia
30	Nelson Piquet Jr. (R)	Turner Scott Motorsports	Chevrolet	Worx Yard Tools
31	Justin Allgaier	Turner Scott Motorsports	Chevrolet	Wolfpack Energy Services
32	Kyle Larson (R)	Turner Scott Motorsports	Chevrolet	Cessna
33	Kevin Harvick (i)	Richard Childress Racing	Chevrolet	Bad Boy Buggies
37	Matt DiBenedetto	Vision Racing	Dodge	National Cash Lenders
39	Ryan Sieg*	RSS Racing	Chevrolet	Pull-A-Part
40	Reed Sorenson	The Motorsports Group	Chevrolet	"Happy Birthday Mom, We Will Miss You!"
42	Josh Wise	The Motorsports Group	Chevrolet	The Motorsports Group
43	Michael Annett	Richard Petty Motorsports	Ford	Pilot Flying J
44	Cole Whitt	TriStar Motorsports	Toyota	Takagi Tankless Water Heaters
50	Danny Efland	MAKE Motorsports	Chevrolet	Defiant Whiskey
51	Jeremy Clements	Jeremy Clements Racing	Chevrolet	All South Electric, Value Lighting
52	Joey Gase	Jimmy Means Racing	Toyota	Donate Life
54	Kyle Busch (i)	Joe Gibbs Racing	Toyota	Monster Energy
55	Jamie Dick	Viva Motorsports	Chevrolet	Viva Motorsports
60	Travis Pastrana	Roush Fenway Racing	Ford	Roush Fenway Racing
70	Tony Raines	ML Motorsports	Toyota	ML Motorsports
74	Mike Harmon	Mike Harmon Racing	Dodge	Mike Harmon Racing
77	Parker Kligerman	Kyle Busch Motorsports	Toyota	Toyota
79	Kyle Fowler	Go Green Racing	Ford	Pull-A-Part, Techniweld
87	Joe Nemechek	NEMCO Motorsports	Toyota	Wood Pellet Grills
89	Morgan Shepherd	Shepherd Racing Ventures	Chevrolet	King's Tire, Racing with Jesus
99	Alex Bowman (R)	RAB Racing	Toyota	ToyotaCare
Official entry list

*Withdrew.

== Practice ==
=== First practice ===
The first practice session was held on Friday, August 30, at 5:00 PM EST, and would last for an hour and 30 minutes. Trevor Bayne of Roush Fenway Racing would set the fastest time in the session, with a lap of 31.029 and an average speed of 178.672 miles per hour (287.545 km/h).

Pos.	#	Driver	Team	Make	Time	Speed
1	6	Trevor Bayne	Roush Fenway Racing	Ford	31.029	178.672
2	22	Joey Logano (i)	Penske Racing	Ford	31.248	177.419
3	33	Kevin Harvick (i)	Richard Childress Racing	Chevrolet	31.319	177.017
Full first practice results

=== Second and final practice ===
The second and final practice session, sometimes referred to as Happy Hour, was held on Saturday, August 31, at 10:30 AM EST, and would last for one hour. Austin Dillon of Richard Childress Racing would set the fastest time in the session, with a lap of 31.029 and an average speed of 178.672 miles per hour (287.545 km/h).

Pos.	#	Driver	Team	Make	Time	Speed
1	3	Austin Dillon	Richard Childress Racing	Chevrolet	30.626	181.023
2	20	Brian Vickers	Joe Gibbs Racing	Toyota	30.791	180.053
3	22	Joey Logano (i)	Penske Racing	Ford	30.794	180.035
Full Happy Hour practice results

== Qualifying ==
Qualifying was held on Saturday, August 31, at 4:05 PM EST. Each driver would have two laps to set a fastest time; the fastest of the two would count as their official qualifying lap.

Kyle Busch of Joe Gibbs Racing would win the pole, setting a time of 30.704 and an average speed of 180.563 miles per hour (290.588 km/h).

No drivers would fail to qualify.

=== Full qualifying results ===
Pos.	#	Driver	Team	Make	Time	Speed
1	54	Kyle Busch (i)	Joe Gibbs Racing	Toyota	30.704	180.563
2	3	Austin Dillon	Richard Childress Racing	Chevrolet	30.724	180.445
3	6	Trevor Bayne	Roush Fenway Racing	Ford	30.943	179.168
4	5	Kasey Kahne (i)	JR Motorsports	Chevrolet	30.985	178.925
5	7	Regan Smith	JR Motorsports	Chevrolet	31.006	178.804
6	12	Sam Hornish Jr.	Penske Racing	Ford	31.058	178.505
7	11	Elliott Sadler	Joe Gibbs Racing	Toyota	31.065	178.465
8	43	Michael Annett	Richard Petty Motorsports	Ford	31.085	178.350
9	20	Brian Vickers	Joe Gibbs Racing	Toyota	31.114	178.183
10	30	Nelson Piquet Jr. (R)	Turner Scott Motorsports	Chevrolet	31.115	178.178
11	60	Travis Pastrana	Roush Fenway Racing	Ford	31.133	178.075
12	2	Brian Scott	Richard Childress Racing	Chevrolet	31.166	177.886
13	32	Kyle Larson (R)	Turner Scott Motorsports	Chevrolet	31.189	177.755
14	31	Justin Allgaier	Turner Scott Motorsports	Chevrolet	31.198	177.704
15	19	Mike Bliss	TriStar Motorsports	Toyota	31.220	177.578
16	22	Joey Logano (i)	Penske Racing	Ford	31.225	177.550
17	77	Parker Kligerman	Kyle Busch Motorsports	Toyota	31.304	177.102
18	99	Alex Bowman (R)	RAB Racing	Toyota	31.324	176.989
19	16	Chris Buescher	Roush Fenway Racing	Ford	31.359	176.791
20	33	Kevin Harvick (i)	Richard Childress Racing	Chevrolet	31.430	176.392
21	87	Joe Nemechek	NEMCO Motorsports	Toyota	31.669	175.061
22	4	Landon Cassill	JD Motorsports	Chevrolet	31.709	174.840
23	51	Jeremy Clements	Jeremy Clements Racing	Chevrolet	31.746	174.636
24	44	Cole Whitt	TriStar Motorsports	Toyota	31.779	174.455
25	40	Reed Sorenson	The Motorsports Group	Chevrolet	31.898	173.804
26	14	Jeff Green	TriStar Motorsports	Toyota	31.971	173.407
27	01	Mike Wallace	JD Motorsports	Chevrolet	32.164	172.367
28	55	Jamie Dick	Viva Motorsports	Chevrolet	32.173	172.318
29	42	Josh Wise	The Motorsports Group	Chevrolet	32.333	171.466
30	79	Kyle Fowler	Go Green Racing	Ford	32.344	171.407
31	24	Ken Butler III	SR² Motorsports	Toyota	32.406	171.079
32	00	Blake Koch	SR² Motorsports	Toyota	32.466	170.763
33	23	Robert Richardson Jr.	R3 Motorsports	Chevrolet	32.744	169.313
34	50	Danny Efland	MAKE Motorsports	Chevrolet	32.841	168.813
35	10	Chase Miller	TriStar Motorsports	Toyota	32.970	168.153
36	70	Tony Raines	ML Motorsports	Toyota	33.387	166.053
37	52	Joey Gase	Jimmy Means Racing	Chevrolet	33.706	164.481
38	37	Matt DiBenedetto	Vision Racing	Dodge	33.810	163.975
39	89	Morgan Shepherd	Shepherd Racing Ventures	Chevrolet	33.812	163.965
40	74	Mike Harmon	Mike Harmon Racing	Chevrolet	34.807	159.278
Withdrew
WD	17	Tanner Berryhill	Vision Racing	Dodge	—	—
WD	39	Ryan Sieg	RSS Racing	Chevrolet	—	—
Official starting lineup

== Race results ==
Fin	St	#	Driver	Team	Make	Laps	Led	Status	Pts	Winnings
1	20	33	Kevin Harvick (i)	Richard Childress Racing	Chevrolet	195	132	running	0	$50,190
2	1	54	Kyle Busch (i)	Joe Gibbs Racing	Toyota	195	57	running	0	$36,475
3	6	12	Sam Hornish Jr.	Penske Racing	Ford	195	0	running	41	$30,975
4	4	5	Kasey Kahne (i)	JR Motorsports	Chevrolet	195	0	running	0	$22,300
5	13	32	Kyle Larson (R)	Turner Scott Motorsports	Chevrolet	195	1	running	34	$27,525
6	16	22	Joey Logano (i)	Penske Racing	Ford	195	0	running	0	$16,575
7	3	6	Trevor Bayne	Roush Fenway Racing	Ford	195	0	running	37	$22,310
8	2	3	Austin Dillon	Richard Childress Racing	Chevrolet	195	1	running	37	$23,920
9	5	7	Regan Smith	JR Motorsports	Chevrolet	195	1	running	36	$21,025
10	12	2	Brian Scott	Richard Childress Racing	Chevrolet	195	0	running	34	$21,350
11	14	31	Justin Allgaier	Turner Scott Motorsports	Chevrolet	195	0	running	33	$19,575
12	10	30	Nelson Piquet Jr. (R)	Turner Scott Motorsports	Chevrolet	195	0	running	32	$19,300
13	19	16	Chris Buescher	Roush Fenway Racing	Ford	195	0	running	31	$18,500
14	8	43	Michael Annett	Richard Petty Motorsports	Ford	195	2	running	31	$17,950
15	9	20	Brian Vickers	Joe Gibbs Racing	Toyota	195	0	running	29	$18,450
16	17	77	Parker Kligerman	Kyle Busch Motorsports	Toyota	195	0	running	28	$18,200
17	11	60	Travis Pastrana	Roush Fenway Racing	Ford	195	0	running	27	$17,625
18	7	11	Elliott Sadler	Joe Gibbs Racing	Toyota	195	0	running	26	$18,525
19	22	4	Landon Cassill	JD Motorsports	Chevrolet	194	0	running	25	$17,450
20	24	44	Cole Whitt	TriStar Motorsports	Toyota	193	0	running	24	$18,025
21	25	40	Reed Sorenson	The Motorsports Group	Chevrolet	193	0	running	23	$17,275
22	15	19	Mike Bliss	TriStar Motorsports	Toyota	193	0	running	22	$17,200
23	23	51	Jeremy Clements	Jeremy Clements Racing	Chevrolet	192	1	running	22	$17,125
24	21	87	Joe Nemechek	NEMCO Motorsports	Toyota	190	0	running	20	$17,050
25	33	23	Robert Richardson Jr.	R3 Motorsports	Chevrolet	189	0	running	19	$17,475
26	30	79	Kyle Fowler	Go Green Racing	Ford	189	0	running	18	$16,950
27	27	01	Mike Wallace	JD Motorsports	Chevrolet	188	0	running	17	$16,900
28	31	24	Ken Butler III	SR² Motorsports	Toyota	186	0	running	16	$16,825
29	26	14	Jeff Green	TriStar Motorsports	Toyota	176	0	crash	15	$16,775
30	36	70	Tony Raines	ML Motorsports	Toyota	102	0	vibration	14	$16,975
31	37	52	Joey Gase	Jimmy Means Racing	Chevrolet	95	0	overheating	13	$16,625
32	28	55	Jamie Dick	Viva Motorsports	Chevrolet	90	0	ignition	12	$16,580
33	38	37	Matt DiBenedetto	Vision Racing	Dodge	38	0	handling	11	$16,510
34	18	99	Alex Bowman (R)	RAB Racing	Toyota	32	0	engine	10	$16,465
35	34	50	Danny Efland	MAKE Motorsports	Chevrolet	27	0	vibration	9	$10,413
36	39	89	Morgan Shepherd	Shepherd Racing Ventures	Chevrolet	18	0	overheating	8	$9,750
37	40	74	Mike Harmon	Mike Harmon Racing	Chevrolet	8	0	rear gear	7	$9,715
38	35	10	Chase Miller	TriStar Motorsports	Toyota	8	0	vibration	6	$9,661
39	29	42	Josh Wise	The Motorsports Group	Chevrolet	7	0	transmission	5	$9,545
40	32	00	Blake Koch	SR² Motorsports	Toyota	5	0	ignition	4	$9,480
Withdrew
WD		17	Tanner Berryhill	Vision Racing	Dodge					
WD		39	Ryan Sieg	RSS Racing	Chevrolet					
Official race results

== Standings after the race ==
Drivers' Championship standings

Pos	Driver	Points
1	Sam Hornish Jr.	842
2	Austin Dillon	832 (-10)
3	Elliott Sadler	816 (-26)
4	Regan Smith	813 (–29)
5	Justin Allgaier	795 (–47)
6	Brian Vickers	790 (–52)
7	Kyle Larson	775 (–67)
8	Brian Scott	775 (–67)
9	Trevor Bayne	771 (–71)
10	Parker Kligerman	724 (–118)
11	Nelson Piquet Jr.	641 (–201)
12	Alex Bowman	638 (–204)
Official driver's standings

- Note: Only the first 12 positions are included for the driver standings.

Previous race: 2013 Food City 250	NASCAR Nationwide Series; 2013 season	Next race: 2013 Virginia 529 College Savings 250
