= 2013 STP 300 =

18th race of the NASCAR Nationwide Series

Race details
- Race 18 of 33 of the 2013 NASCAR Nationwide Series
- Date: July 21, 2013
- Official name: 3rd Annual STP 300
- Location: Joliet, Illinois, Chicagoland Speedway
- Course: Permanent racing facility
- Course length: 1.5 miles (2.41 km)
- Distance: 200 laps, 300 mi (482.803 km)
- Scheduled distance: 200 laps, 300 mi (482.803 km)
- Average speed: 125.684 miles per hour (202.269 km/h)

Pole position
Driver	Sam Hornish Jr.	Penske Racing
- Time: 30.279

Most laps led
Driver	Elliott Sadler	Joe Gibbs Racing
- Laps: 81

Winner
No. 22	Joey Logano	Penske Racing

Television in the United States
- Network: ESPN
- Announcers: Allen Bestwick, Dale Jarrett, Andy Petree

Radio in the United States
- Radio: Motor Racing Network

The 2013 STP 300 was the 18th stock car race of the 2013 NASCAR Nationwide Series and the 24th iteration of the event. The race was held on Sunday, July 21, 2013, in Joliet, Illinois, at Chicagoland Speedway, a 1.5 miles (2.41 km) tri-oval speedway. The race took the scheduled 200 laps to complete. At race's end, Joey Logano, driving for Penske Racing, would be able to take away the lead from teammate and eventual-second-place finisher Sam Hornish Jr. to win his 20th career NASCAR Nationwide Series win and his second of the season. To fill out the podium, Austin Dillon of Richard Childress Racing finished third.

== Background ==
The layout of Chicagoland Speedway, the venue where the race was held.

Chicagoland Speedway is a 1.5 miles (2.41 km) tri-oval speedway in Joliet, Illinois, southwest of Chicago. The speedway opened in 2001 and currently hosts NASCAR racing. Until 2011, the speedway also hosted the IndyCar Series, recording numerous close finishes including the closest finish in IndyCar history. The speedway is owned and operated by International Speedway Corporation and located adjacent to Route 66 Raceway.

=== Entry list ===
- (R) denotes rookie driver.
- (i) denotes driver who is ineligible for series driver points.

#	Driver	Team	Make	Sponsor
00	Ken Butler III	SR² Motorsports	Toyota	M&W Transportation
01	Mike Wallace	JD Motorsports	Chevrolet	Gerber Collision & Glass
2	Brian Scott	Richard Childress Racing	Chevrolet	Fast Fixin'
3	Austin Dillon	Richard Childress Racing	Chevrolet	AdvoCare
4	Landon Cassill	JD Motorsports	Chevrolet	Flex Seal
5	Kasey Kahne (i)	JR Motorsports	Chevrolet	Great Clips
6	Trevor Bayne	Roush Fenway Racing	Ford	Ford EcoBoost
7	Regan Smith	JR Motorsports	Chevrolet	Speedco
10	Jeff Green	TriStar Motorsports	Toyota	TriStar Motorsports
11	Elliott Sadler	Joe Gibbs Racing	Toyota	OneMain Financial
12	Sam Hornish Jr.	Penske Racing	Ford	Alliance Truck Parts
14	Eric McClure	TriStar Motorsports	Toyota	Hefty, Reynolds Wrap
15	Carl Long	Rick Ware Racing	Ford	FAIR Girls
17	Tanner Berryhill	Vision Racing	Toyota	National Cash Lenders
19	Mike Bliss	TriStar Motorsports	Toyota	TriStar Motorsports
20	Brian Vickers	Joe Gibbs Racing	Toyota	Dollar General
21	Dakoda Armstrong (i)	Richard Childress Racing	Chevrolet	WinField
22	Joey Logano (i)	Penske Racing	Ford	Hertz
23	Harrison Rhodes	Rick Ware Racing	Ford	Vecoplan Midwest
24	Blake Koch	SR² Motorsports	Toyota	SR² Motorsports
30	Nelson Piquet Jr. (R)	Turner Scott Motorsports	Chevrolet	Worx Yard Tools
31	Justin Allgaier	Turner Scott Motorsports	Chevrolet	Brandt Professional Agriculture
32	Kyle Larson (R)	Turner Scott Motorsports	Chevrolet	International Trucks
33	Matt Crafton (i)	Richard Childress Racing	Chevrolet	Menards, Rheem
37	Matt DiBenedetto	Vision Racing	Dodge	National Cash Lenders
40	Reed Sorenson	The Motorsports Group	Chevrolet	Swisher E-Cigarette
42	T. J. Bell	The Motorsports Group	Chevrolet	The Motorsports Group
43	Michael Annett	Richard Petty Motorsports	Ford	STP
44	Chad Hackenbracht (i)	TriStar Motorsports	Toyota	Tastee Apple
46	Tim Schendel	The Motorsports Group	Chevrolet	The Motorsports Group
51	Jeremy Clements	Jeremy Clements Racing	Chevrolet	EM Exploration
52	Joey Gase	Jimmy Means Racing	Toyota	Donate Life
54	Joey Coulter (i)	Joe Gibbs Racing	Toyota	Monster Energy
60	Travis Pastrana	Roush Fenway Racing	Ford	Valvoline NextGen
70	Johanna Long	ML Motorsports	Chevrolet	Wish for Our Heroes
74	Kevin Lepage	Mike Harmon Racing	Chevrolet	Koma Unwind, I-Car Gold Class
77	Parker Kligerman	Kyle Busch Motorsports	Toyota	Toyota
79	Kyle Fowler	Go Green Racing	Ford	Techniweld
87	Joe Nemechek	NEMCO Motorsports	Toyota	R.G.E. Manufacturing
92	Dexter Stacey (R)	KH Motorsports	Ford	Maddie's Place Rocks
99	Alex Bowman (R)	RAB Racing	Toyota	St. Jude Children's Research Hospital
Official entry list

== Practice ==
=== First practice ===
The first practice session was held on Saturday, July 20, at 11:30 AM CST, and would last for two hours and 30 minutes. Regan Smith of JR Motorsports would set the fastest time in the session, with a lap of 30.690 and an average speed of 175.953 miles per hour (283.169 km/h).

Pos.	#	Driver	Team	Make	Time	Speed
1	7	Regan Smith	JR Motorsports	Chevrolet	30.690	175.953
2	60	Travis Pastrana	Roush Fenway Racing	Ford	31.200	173.077
3	99	Alex Bowman (R)	RAB Racing	Toyota	31.240	172.855
Full first practice results

=== Second practice ===
The second and final practice session, sometimes referred to as Happy Hour, was held on Saturday, July 20, at 2:30 PM EST, and would last for one hour and 30 minutes. Brian Scott of Richard Childress Racing would set the fastest time in the session, with a lap of 31.079 and an average speed of 173.751 miles per hour (279.625 km/h).

Pos.	#	Driver	Team	Make	Time	Speed
1	2	Brian Scott	Richard Childress Racing	Chevrolet	31.079	173.751
2	3	Austin Dillon	Richard Childress Racing	Chevrolet	31.127	173.483
3	99	Alex Bowman (R)	RAB Racing	Toyota	31.147	173.371
Full Happy Hour practice results

== Qualifying ==
Qualifying was held on Sunday, July 21, at 10:05 AM CST. Each driver would have two laps to set a fastest time; the fastest of the two would count as their official qualifying lap.

Sam Hornish Jr. of Penske Racing would win the pole, setting a time of 30.279 and an average speed of 178.341 miles per hour (287.012 km/h).

Tim Schendel was the only driver to fail to qualify.

=== Full qualifying results ===
Pos.	#	Driver	Team	Make	Time	Speed
1	12	Sam Hornish Jr.	Penske Racing	Ford	30.279	178.341
2	11	Elliott Sadler	Joe Gibbs Racing	Toyota	30.292	178.265
3	3	Austin Dillon	Richard Childress Racing	Chevrolet	30.352	177.912
4	33	Matt Crafton (i)	Richard Childress Racing	Chevrolet	30.394	177.667
5	60	Travis Pastrana	Roush Fenway Racing	Ford	30.402	177.620
6	20	Brian Vickers	Joe Gibbs Racing	Toyota	30.407	177.591
7	22	Joey Logano (i)	Penske Racing	Ford	30.423	177.497
8	6	Trevor Bayne	Roush Fenway Racing	Ford	30.424	177.491
9	2	Brian Scott	Richard Childress Racing	Chevrolet	30.494	177.084
10	77	Parker Kligerman	Kyle Busch Motorsports	Toyota	30.502	177.038
11	99	Alex Bowman (R)	RAB Racing	Toyota	30.624	176.332
12	5	Brad Sweet	JR Motorsports	Chevrolet	30.631	176.292
13	7	Regan Smith	JR Motorsports	Chevrolet	30.647	176.200
14	19	Mike Bliss	TriStar Motorsports	Toyota	30.650	176.183
15	54	Joey Coulter (i)	Joe Gibbs Racing	Toyota	30.662	176.114
16	31	Justin Allgaier	Turner Scott Motorsports	Chevrolet	30.685	175.982
17	21	Dakoda Armstrong (i)	Richard Childress Racing	Chevrolet	30.889	174.820
18	43	Michael Annett	Richard Petty Motorsports	Ford	30.918	174.656
19	87	Joe Nemechek	NEMCO Motorsports	Toyota	31.139	173.416
20	14	Eric McClure	TriStar Motorsports	Toyota	31.170	173.244
21	30	Nelson Piquet Jr. (R)	Turner Scott Motorsports	Chevrolet	31.190	173.132
22	32	Kyle Larson (R)	Turner Scott Motorsports	Chevrolet	31.221	172.961
23	70	Johanna Long	ML Motorsports	Chevrolet	31.276	172.656
24	10	Jeff Green	TriStar Motorsports	Toyota	31.276	172.656
25	17	Tanner Berryhill	Vision Racing	Toyota	31.286	172.601
26	52	Joey Gase	Jimmy Means Racing	Toyota	31.296	172.546
27	40	Reed Sorenson	The Motorsports Group	Chevrolet	31.315	172.441
28	79	Kyle Fowler	Go Green Racing	Ford	31.331	172.353
29	24	Blake Koch	SR² Motorsports	Toyota	31.345	172.276
30	51	Jeremy Clements	Jeremy Clements Racing	Chevrolet	31.354	172.227
31	42	T. J. Bell	The Motorsports Group	Chevrolet	31.375	172.112
32	00	Ken Butler III	SR² Motorsports	Toyota	31.391	172.024
33	4	Landon Cassill	JD Motorsports	Chevrolet	31.426	171.832
34	01	Mike Wallace	JD Motorsports	Chevrolet	31.545	171.184
35	44	Chad Hackenbracht (i)	TriStar Motorsports	Toyota	31.594	170.919
36	37	Matt DiBenedetto	Vision Racing	Dodge	31.776	169.940
37	74	Kevin Lepage	Mike Harmon Racing	Chevrolet	31.785	169.891
38	15	Carl Long	Rick Ware Racing	Ford	31.975	168.882
Qualified by owner's points
39	23	Harrison Rhodes	Rick Ware Racing	Ford	32.123	168.104
Last car to qualify on time
40	92	Dexter Stacey (R)	KH Motorsports	Ford	32.062	168.424
Failed to qualify
41	46	Tim Schendel	The Motorsports Group	Chevrolet	32.136	168.036
Official starting lineup

== Race results ==
Fin	St	#	Driver	Team	Make	Laps	Led	Status	Pts	Winnings
1	7	22	Joey Logano (i)	Penske Racing	Ford	200	35	running	0	$85,615
2	1	12	Sam Hornish Jr.	Penske Racing	Ford	200	56	running	43	$67,150
3	3	3	Austin Dillon	Richard Childress Racing	Chevrolet	200	24	running	42	$153,775
4	2	11	Elliott Sadler	Joe Gibbs Racing	Toyota	200	81	running	42	$43,775
5	6	20	Brian Vickers	Joe Gibbs Racing	Toyota	200	0	running	39	$33,150
6	10	77	Parker Kligerman	Kyle Busch Motorsports	Toyota	200	0	running	38	$28,950
7	8	6	Trevor Bayne	Roush Fenway Racing	Ford	200	0	running	37	$27,235
8	16	31	Justin Allgaier	Turner Scott Motorsports	Chevrolet	200	0	running	36	$26,170
9	12	5	Brad Sweet	JR Motorsports	Chevrolet	200	0	running	35	$25,050
10	4	33	Matt Crafton (i)	Richard Childress Racing	Chevrolet	200	0	running	0	$26,050
11	9	2	Brian Scott	Richard Childress Racing	Chevrolet	200	0	running	33	$24,125
12	22	32	Kyle Larson (R)	Turner Scott Motorsports	Chevrolet	200	4	running	33	$24,275
13	13	7	Regan Smith	JR Motorsports	Chevrolet	200	0	running	31	$22,750
14	15	54	Joey Coulter (i)	Joe Gibbs Racing	Toyota	200	0	running	0	$22,225
15	17	21	Dakoda Armstrong (i)	Richard Childress Racing	Chevrolet	200	0	running	0	$17,150
16	18	43	Michael Annett	Richard Petty Motorsports	Ford	200	0	running	28	$21,750
17	21	30	Nelson Piquet Jr. (R)	Turner Scott Motorsports	Chevrolet	200	0	running	27	$21,625
18	5	60	Travis Pastrana	Roush Fenway Racing	Ford	199	0	running	26	$21,950
19	14	19	Mike Bliss	TriStar Motorsports	Toyota	199	0	running	25	$21,375
20	23	70	Johanna Long	ML Motorsports	Chevrolet	199	0	running	24	$21,750
21	33	4	Landon Cassill	JD Motorsports	Chevrolet	198	0	running	23	$21,300
22	35	44	Chad Hackenbracht (i)	TriStar Motorsports	Toyota	197	0	running	0	$20,975
23	19	87	Joe Nemechek	NEMCO Motorsports	Toyota	196	0	running	21	$20,825
24	34	01	Mike Wallace	JD Motorsports	Chevrolet	196	0	running	20	$20,700
25	30	51	Jeremy Clements	Jeremy Clements Racing	Chevrolet	196	0	running	19	$21,035
26	28	79	Kyle Fowler	Go Green Racing	Ford	196	0	running	18	$20,425
27	29	24	Blake Koch	SR² Motorsports	Toyota	195	0	running	17	$20,275
28	20	14	Eric McClure	TriStar Motorsports	Toyota	195	0	running	16	$20,100
29	40	92	Dexter Stacey (R)	KH Motorsports	Ford	195	0	running	15	$13,975
30	27	40	Reed Sorenson	The Motorsports Group	Chevrolet	175	0	engine	14	$20,125
31	11	99	Alex Bowman (R)	RAB Racing	Toyota	172	0	running	13	$19,700
32	39	23	Harrison Rhodes	Rick Ware Racing	Ford	45	0	engine	12	$19,580
33	37	74	Kevin Lepage	Mike Harmon Racing	Chevrolet	36	0	electrical	11	$19,460
34	25	17	Tanner Berryhill	Vision Racing	Toyota	20	0	track bar	10	$13,340
35	38	15	Carl Long	Rick Ware Racing	Ford	14	0	handling	9	$13,214
36	31	42	T. J. Bell	The Motorsports Group	Chevrolet	13	0	vibration	8	$12,275
37	24	10	Jeff Green	TriStar Motorsports	Toyota	11	0	vibration	7	$12,240
38	32	00	Ken Butler III	SR² Motorsports	Toyota	10	0	wheel	6	$12,186
39	36	37	Matt DiBenedetto	Vision Racing	Dodge	6	0	electrical	5	$12,070
40	26	52	Joey Gase	Jimmy Means Racing	Toyota	1	0	engine	4	$12,030
Failed to qualify
41		46	Tim Schendel	The Motorsports Group	Chevrolet					
Official race results

Previous race: 2013 CNBC Prime's The Profit 200	NASCAR Nationwide Series; 2013 season	Next race: 2013 Indiana 250
