= 2013 Dollar General 300 (Chicagoland) =

26th race of the 2013 NASCAR Nationwide Series

2013 Dollar General 300 Powered by Coca-Cola
Race details
- Race 26 of 33 of the 2013 NASCAR Nationwide Series
- Date: September 14, 2013
- Official name: 13th Annual Dollar General 300 Powered by Coca-Cola
- Location: Joliet, Illinois, Chicagoland Speedway
- Course: Permanent racing facility
- Course length: 2.41 km (1.5 miles)
- Distance: 200 laps, 300 mi (482.803 km)
- Scheduled distance: 200 laps, 300 mi (482.803 km)
- Average speed: 131.804 miles per hour (212.118 km/h)

Pole position
Driver	Kyle Busch	Joe Gibbs Racing
- Time: 30.173

Most laps led
Driver	Kyle Busch	Joe Gibbs Racing
- Laps: 195

Winner
No. 54	Kyle Busch	Joe Gibbs Racing

Television in the United States
- Network: ESPN2
- Announcers: Marty Reid, Dale Jarrett, Andy Petree

Radio in the United States
- Radio: Motor Racing Network

The 2013 Dollar General 300 Powered by Coca-Cola was the 26th stock car race of the 2013 NASCAR Nationwide Series and the 13th iteration of the event. The race was held on Saturday, September 14, 2013, in Joliet, Illinois, at Chicagoland Speedway, a 1.5 miles (2.41 km) tri-oval speedway. The race took the scheduled 200 laps to complete. At race's end, Kyle Busch, driving for Joe Gibbs Racing, would dominate the race to win his 61st career NASCAR Nationwide Series and his 10th win of the season. To fill out the podium, Joey Logano and Sam Hornish Jr., both driving for Penske Racing, would finish second and third, respectively.

== Background ==
The layout of Chicagoland Speedway, the venue where the race was held.

Chicagoland Speedway is a 1.5 miles (2.41 km) tri-oval speedway in Joliet, Illinois, southwest of Chicago. The speedway opened in 2001 and currently hosts NASCAR racing. Until 2011, the speedway also hosted the IndyCar Series, recording numerous close finishes including the closest finish in IndyCar history. The speedway is owned and operated by International Speedway Corporation and located adjacent to Route 66 Raceway.

=== Entry list ===
- (R) denotes rookie driver.
- (i) denotes driver who is ineligible for series driver points.

#	Driver	Team	Make	Sponsor
00	Blake Koch	SR² Motorsports	Toyota	Kappa Sigma
01	Mike Wallace	JD Motorsports	Chevrolet	G&K Services
2	Brian Scott	Richard Childress Racing	Chevrolet	Shore Lodge
3	Austin Dillon	Richard Childress Racing	Chevrolet	AdvoCare
4	Landon Cassill	JD Motorsports	Chevrolet	Line-X Protective Coatings
5	Brad Sweet	JR Motorsports	Chevrolet	Keen Parts
6	Trevor Bayne	Roush Fenway Racing	Ford	Ford EcoBoost
7	Regan Smith	JR Motorsports	Chevrolet	Clean Coal
10	Jeff Green	TriStar Motorsports	Toyota	TriStar Motorsports
11	Elliott Sadler	Joe Gibbs Racing	Toyota	OneMain Financial
12	Sam Hornish Jr.	Penske Racing	Ford	Würth
14	Eric McClure	TriStar Motorsports	Toyota	Hefty Ultimate with Arm & Hammer
15	Carl Long	Rick Ware Racing	Chevrolet	Qolix
18	Matt Kenseth (i)	Joe Gibbs Racing	Toyota	GameStop
19	Mike Bliss	TriStar Motorsports	Toyota	TriStar Motorsports
20	Brian Vickers	Joe Gibbs Racing	Toyota	Dollar General
22	Joey Logano (i)	Penske Racing	Ford	Discount Tire
23	Juan Carlos Blum (R)	Rick Ware Racing	Ford	Oleofinos, VMP Nutrition
24	Brett Butler	SR² Motorsports	Toyota	RE/MAX, 5 Star Lodge & Stables
29	Kenny Wallace	RAB Racing	Toyota	ToyotaCare
30	Nelson Piquet Jr. (R)	Turner Scott Motorsports	Chevrolet	Hooters Celebrating 30 Years
31	Justin Allgaier	Turner Scott Motorsports	Chevrolet	Brandt Professional Agriculture, WinField United
32	Kyle Larson (R)	Turner Scott Motorsports	Chevrolet	Snickers
33	Kevin Harvick (i)	Richard Childress Racing	Chevrolet	Menards, Rheem
37	Matt DiBenedetto	Vision Racing	Dodge	National Cash Lenders
40	Reed Sorenson	The Motorsports Group	Chevrolet	The Motorsports Group
42	Josh Wise	The Motorsports Group	Chevrolet	The Motorsports Group
43	Michael Annett	Richard Petty Motorsports	Ford	Pilot Travel Centers
44	Chad Hackenbracht (i)	TriStar Motorsports	Toyota	Ingersoll Rand
46	J. J. Yeley (i)	The Motorsports Group	Chevrolet	The Motorsports Group
51	Jeremy Clements	Jeremy Clements Racing	Chevrolet	Jeremy Clements Racing
52	Joey Gase	Jimmy Means Racing	Toyota	Donate Life
54	Kyle Busch (i)	Joe Gibbs Racing	Toyota	Monster Energy
60	Travis Pastrana	Roush Fenway Racing	Ford	Roush Fenway Racing
70	Johanna Long	ML Motorsports	Chevrolet	ForeTravel Motorcoach
73	Derrike Cope*	Creation-Cope Racing	Chevrolet	
74	Kevin Lepage	Mike Harmon Racing	Dodge	Mike Harmon Racing
77	Parker Kligerman	Kyle Busch Motorsports	Toyota	Bandit Chippers
79	Maryeve Dufault	Go Green Racing	Ford	SK Hand Tools
87	Joe Nemechek	NEMCO Motorsports	Toyota	Wood Pellet Grills
88	Dale Earnhardt Jr. (i)	JR Motorsports	Chevrolet	Great Clips
89	Morgan Shepherd	Shepherd Racing Ventures	Chevrolet	King's Tire, Racing with Jesus
98	Kevin Swindell (R)	Biagi-DenBeste Racing	Ford	Carroll Shelby Engine Co., DenBeste Heavy Equipment
99	Alex Bowman (R)	RAB Racing	Toyota	ToyotaCare
Official race results

== Practice ==
=== First practice ===
The first practice session was held on Friday, September 13, at 1:40 PM CST, and would last for one hour and 15 minutes. Kyle Larson of Turner Scott Motorsports would set the fastest time in the session, with a lap of 30.499 and an average speed of 177.055 miles per hour (284.942 km/h).

Pos.	#	Driver	Team	Make	Time	Speed
1	32	Kyle Larson (R)	Turner Scott Motorsports	Chevrolet	30.499	177.055
2	99	Alex Bowman (R)	RAB Racing	Toyota	30.807	175.285
3	31	Justin Allgaier	Turner Scott Motorsports	Chevrolet	30.814	175.245
Full first practice results

=== Second and final practice ===
The second and final practice session, sometimes referred to as Happy Hour, was held on Friday, September 13, at 5:35 PM EST, and would last for one hour and 15 minutes. Austin Dillon of Richard Childress Racing would set the fastest time in the session, with a lap of 30.042 and an average speed of 179.748 miles per hour (289.276 km/h).

Pos.	#	Driver	Team	Make	Time	Speed
1	3	Austin Dillon	Richard Childress Racing	Chevrolet	30.042	179.748
2	33	Kevin Harvick (i)	Richard Childress Racing	Chevrolet	30.170	178.986
3	30	Nelson Piquet Jr. (R)	Turner Scott Motorsports	Chevrolet	30.179	178.932
Full Happy Hour practice results

== Qualifying ==
Qualifying was held on Saturday, September 14, at 11:05 AM CST. Each driver would have two laps to set a fastest time; the fastest of the two would count as their official qualifying lap.

Kyle Busch of Joe Gibbs Racing would win the pole, setting a time of 30.173 and an average speed of 178.968 miles per hour (288.021 km/h).

Three drivers would fail to qualify: Josh Wise, Carl Long, and Morgan Shepherd.

=== Full qualifying results ===
Pos.	#	Driver	Team	Make	Time	Speed
1	54	Kyle Busch (i)	Joe Gibbs Racing	Toyota	30.173	178.968
2	3	Austin Dillon	Richard Childress Racing	Chevrolet	30.190	178.867
3	22	Joey Logano (i)	Penske Racing	Ford	30.236	178.595
4	12	Sam Hornish Jr.	Penske Racing	Ford	30.452	177.328
5	77	Parker Kligerman	Kyle Busch Motorsports	Toyota	30.463	177.264
6	88	Dale Earnhardt Jr. (i)	JR Motorsports	Chevrolet	30.469	177.229
7	11	Elliott Sadler	Joe Gibbs Racing	Toyota	30.474	177.200
8	99	Alex Bowman (R)	RAB Racing	Toyota	30.528	176.887
9	30	Nelson Piquet Jr. (R)	Turner Scott Motorsports	Chevrolet	30.540	176.817
10	20	Brian Vickers	Joe Gibbs Racing	Toyota	30.581	176.580
11	29	Kenny Wallace	RAB Racing	Toyota	30.684	175.987
12	5	Brad Sweet	JR Motorsports	Chevrolet	30.696	175.919
13	33	Kevin Harvick (i)	Richard Childress Racing	Chevrolet	30.710	175.838
14	6	Trevor Bayne	Roush Fenway Racing	Ford	30.742	175.655
15	43	Michael Annett	Richard Petty Motorsports	Ford	30.792	175.370
16	7	Regan Smith	JR Motorsports	Chevrolet	30.822	175.200
17	98	Kevin Swindell (R)	Biagi-DenBeste Racing	Ford	30.890	174.814
18	18	Matt Kenseth (i)	Joe Gibbs Racing	Toyota	30.954	174.452
19	2	Brian Scott	Richard Childress Racing	Chevrolet	30.959	174.424
20	31	Justin Allgaier	Turner Scott Motorsports	Chevrolet	31.089	173.695
21	51	Jeremy Clements	Jeremy Clements Racing	Chevrolet	31.114	173.555
22	70	Johanna Long	ML Motorsports	Chevrolet	31.161	173.294
23	87	Joe Nemechek	NEMCO Motorsports	Toyota	31.169	173.249
24	60	Travis Pastrana	Roush Fenway Racing	Ford	31.170	173.244
25	14	Eric McClure	TriStar Motorsports	Toyota	31.208	173.033
26	01	Mike Wallace	JD Motorsports	Chevrolet	31.283	172.618
27	44	Chad Hackenbracht (i)	TriStar Motorsports	Toyota	31.401	171.969
28	00	Blake Koch	SR² Motorsports	Toyota	31.452	171.690
29	4	Landon Cassill	JD Motorsports	Chevrolet	31.464	171.625
30	74	Kevin Lepage	Mike Harmon Racing	Dodge	31.634	170.702
31	52	Joey Gase	Jimmy Means Racing	Toyota	31.707	170.309
32	24	Brett Butler	SR² Motorsports	Toyota	31.714	170.272
33	37	Tanner Berryhill	Vision Racing	Dodge	31.813	169.742
34	46	J. J. Yeley (i)	The Motorsports Group	Chevrolet	31.820	169.705
35	19	Mike Bliss	TriStar Motorsports	Toyota	32.190	167.754
36	79	Maryeve Dufault	Go Green Racing	Ford	32.207	167.665
37	23	Juan Carlos Blum (R)	Rick Ware Racing	Ford	32.506	166.123
Qualified by owner's points
38	40	Reed Sorenson	The Motorsports Group	Chevrolet	33.595	160.738
39	32	Kyle Larson (R)	Turner Scott Motorsports	Chevrolet	—	—
Champion's Provisional
40	10	Jeff Green	TriStar Motorsports	Toyota	—	—
Failed to qualify or withdrew
41	42	Josh Wise	The Motorsports Group	Chevrolet	31.903	169.263
42	15	Carl Long	Rick Ware Racing	Chevrolet	31.925	169.146
43	89	Morgan Shepherd	Shepherd Racing Ventures	Chevrolet	32.698	165.148
WD	73	Derrike Cope	Creation-Cope Racing	Chevrolet	—	—
Official starting lineup

== Race results ==
Fin	St	#	Driver	Team	Make	Laps	Led	Status	Pts	Winnings
1	1	54	Kyle Busch (i)	Joe Gibbs Racing	Toyota	200	195	running	0	$82,650
2	3	22	Joey Logano (i)	Penske Racing	Ford	200	2	running	0	$60,050
3	4	12	Sam Hornish Jr.	Penske Racing	Ford	200	0	running	41	$53,525
4	2	3	Austin Dillon	Richard Childress Racing	Chevrolet	200	0	running	40	$47,475
5	6	88	Dale Earnhardt Jr. (i)	JR Motorsports	Chevrolet	200	2	running	0	$31,975
6	10	20	Brian Vickers	Joe Gibbs Racing	Toyota	200	0	running	38	$31,375
7	18	18	Matt Kenseth (i)	Joe Gibbs Racing	Toyota	200	0	running	0	$24,325
8	5	77	Parker Kligerman	Kyle Busch Motorsports	Toyota	200	0	running	36	$29,675
9	13	33	Kevin Harvick (i)	Richard Childress Racing	Chevrolet	200	0	running	0	$22,135
10	9	30	Nelson Piquet Jr. (R)	Turner Scott Motorsports	Chevrolet	200	0	running	34	$29,500
11	8	99	Alex Bowman (R)	RAB Racing	Toyota	200	0	running	33	$26,750
12	20	31	Justin Allgaier	Turner Scott Motorsports	Chevrolet	200	0	running	32	$26,200
13	16	7	Regan Smith	JR Motorsports	Chevrolet	200	0	running	31	$25,650
14	19	2	Brian Scott	Richard Childress Racing	Chevrolet	200	0	running	30	$25,140
15	14	6	Trevor Bayne	Roush Fenway Racing	Ford	200	0	running	29	$25,780
16	17	98	Kevin Swindell (R)	Biagi-DenBeste Racing	Ford	200	0	running	28	$24,470
17	11	29	Kenny Wallace	RAB Racing	Toyota	200	0	running	27	$18,185
18	15	43	Michael Annett	Richard Petty Motorsports	Ford	200	0	running	26	$23,925
19	7	11	Elliott Sadler	Joe Gibbs Racing	Toyota	199	0	running	25	$24,715
20	12	5	Brad Sweet	JR Motorsports	Chevrolet	198	0	running	24	$24,180
21	27	44	Chad Hackenbracht (i)	TriStar Motorsports	Toyota	198	0	running	0	$23,395
22	29	4	Landon Cassill	JD Motorsports	Chevrolet	198	0	running	22	$23,285
23	35	19	Mike Bliss	TriStar Motorsports	Toyota	198	0	running	21	$23,150
24	21	51	Jeremy Clements	Jeremy Clements Racing	Chevrolet	198	1	running	21	$23,040
25	25	14	Eric McClure	TriStar Motorsports	Toyota	198	0	running	19	$23,380
26	22	70	Johanna Long	ML Motorsports	Chevrolet	197	0	running	18	$22,795
27	24	60	Travis Pastrana	Roush Fenway Racing	Ford	196	0	running	17	$22,685
28	26	01	Mike Wallace	JD Motorsports	Chevrolet	193	0	running	16	$22,565
29	37	23	Juan Carlos Blum (R)	Rick Ware Racing	Ford	189	0	running	15	$22,415
30	23	87	Joe Nemechek	NEMCO Motorsports	Toyota	186	0	electrical	14	$22,605
31	36	79	Maryeve Dufault	Go Green Racing	Ford	183	0	running	13	$22,150
32	39	32	Kyle Larson (R)	Turner Scott Motorsports	Chevrolet	175	0	crash	12	$22,040
33	38	40	Reed Sorenson	The Motorsports Group	Chevrolet	172	0	running	11	$21,925
34	32	24	Brett Butler	SR² Motorsports	Toyota	146	0	crash	10	$21,814
35	31	52	Joey Gase	Jimmy Means Racing	Toyota	46	0	engine	9	$21,689
36	30	74	Kevin Lepage	Mike Harmon Racing	Dodge	30	0	fuel pump	8	$20,445
37	33	37	Tanner Berryhill	Vision Racing	Dodge	21	0	electrical	7	$14,325
38	28	00	Blake Koch	SR² Motorsports	Toyota	7	0	transmission	6	$14,265
39	34	46	J. J. Yeley (i)	The Motorsports Group	Chevrolet	4	0	rear gear	0	$13,940
40	40	10	Jeff Green	TriStar Motorsports	Toyota	3	0	vibration	4	$13,830
Failed to qualify or withdrew
41		42	Josh Wise	The Motorsports Group	Chevrolet					
42		15	Carl Long	Rick Ware Racing	Chevrolet					
43		89	Morgan Shepherd	Shepherd Racing Ventures	Chevrolet					
WD		73	Derrike Cope	Creation-Cope Racing	Chevrolet					
Official race results

== Standings after the race ==
Drivers' Championship standings

Pos	Driver	Points
1	Sam Hornish Jr.	921
2	Austin Dillon	904 (-17)
3	Regan Smith	885 (-36)
4	Elliott Sadler	877 (–44)
5	Brian Vickers	865 (–56)
6	Justin Allgaier	860 (–61)
7	Brian Scott	849 (–72)
8	Trevor Bayne	839 (–82)
9	Kyle Larson	811 (–110)
10	Parker Kligerman	768 (–153)
Official driver's standings

- Note: Only the first 10 positions are included for the driver standings.

Previous race: 2013 Virginia 529 College Savings 250	NASCAR Nationwide Series; 2013 season	Next race: 2013 Kentucky 300
