= 2013 VFW Sport Clips Help a Hero 200 =

Ninth race of the 2013 NASCAR Nationwide Series

Race details
- Race 9 of 33 of the 2013 NASCAR Nationwide Series
- Date: May 10, 2013
- Official name: 31st Annual VFW Sport Clips Help a Hero 200
- Location: Darlington, South Carolina, Darlington Raceway
- Course: Permanent racing facility
- Course length: 1.366 miles (2.198 km)
- Distance: 147 laps, 200.802 mi (323.159 km)
- Scheduled distance: 147 laps, 200.802 mi (323.159 km)
- Average speed: 130.816 miles per hour (210.528 km/h)

Pole position
Driver	Kyle Busch	Joe Gibbs Racing
- Time: 28.494

Most laps led
Driver	Kyle Busch	Joe Gibbs Racing
- Laps: 107

Winner
No. 54	Kyle Busch	Joe Gibbs Racing

Television in the United States
- Network: ESPN2
- Announcers: Allen Bestwick, Dale Jarrett, Andy Petree

Radio in the United States
- Radio: Motor Racing Network

The 2013 VFW Sport Clips Help a Hero 200 was the ninth stock car race of the 2013 NASCAR Nationwide Series and the 31st iteration of the event. The race was held on Friday, May 10, 2013, in Darlington, South Carolina, at Darlington Raceway, a 1.366 miles (2.198 km) permanent egg-shaped oval racetrack. The race took the scheduled 147 laps to complete. At race's end, Joe Gibbs Racing driver Kyle Busch would dominate the race to win his 56th career NASCAR Nationwide Series win and his fifth win of the season. To fill out the podium, Elliott Sadler and Matt Kenseth of Joe Gibbs Racing would finish second and third, respectively.

== Background ==
The layout of Darlington Raceway, the venue where the race was held.

Darlington Raceway is a race track built for NASCAR racing located near Darlington, South Carolina. It is nicknamed "The Lady in Black" and "The Track Too Tough to Tame" by many NASCAR fans and drivers and advertised as "A NASCAR Tradition." It is of a unique, somewhat egg-shaped design, an oval with the ends of very different configurations, a condition which supposedly arose from the proximity of one end of the track to a minnow pond the owner refused to relocate. This situation makes it very challenging for the crews to set up their cars' handling in a way that is effective at both ends.

=== Entry list ===
#	Driver	Team	Make	Sponsor
00	Blake Koch	SR² Motorsports	Toyota	Compassion International
01	Mike Wallace	JD Motorsports	Chevrolet	Mac's Pride
2	Brian Scott	Richard Childress Racing	Chevrolet	Shore Lodge
3	Austin Dillon	Richard Childress Racing	Chevrolet	AdvoCare
4	Landon Cassill	JD Motorsports	Chevrolet	Flex Seal
5	Kasey Kahne	JR Motorsports	Chevrolet	Great Clips
6	Trevor Bayne	Roush Fenway Racing	Ford	Cargill "Our Certified Ground Beef"
7	Regan Smith	JR Motorsports	Chevrolet	Hellmann's 100th Anniversary, BI-LO
10	Jeff Green	TriStar Motorsports	Toyota	TriStar Motorsports
11	Elliott Sadler	Joe Gibbs Racing	Toyota	Sport Clips Haircuts
12	Sam Hornish Jr.	Penske Racing	Ford	Alliance Truck Parts
14	Eric McClure	TriStar Motorsports	Toyota	Hefty, Reynolds Wrap
15	Stanton Barrett*	Rick Ware Racing	Ford	FAIR Girls
16	Chris Buescher	Roush Fenway Racing	Ford	One Fund Boston
17	Tanner Berryhill	Vision Racing	Toyota	Keller Williams Realty "What's Your One Thing?"
18	Matt Kenseth	Joe Gibbs Racing	Toyota	GameStop, Injustice: Gods Among Us
19	Mike Bliss	TriStar Motorsports	Toyota	Fix a Flat "Just Connect, Inflate, and Go!"
20	Brian Vickers	Joe Gibbs Racing	Toyota	Dollar General
22	Joey Logano	Penske Racing	Ford	Penske Truck Leasing
23	Harrison Rhodes	Rick Ware Racing	Ford	Sterling Building Group, Triad Golf Carts
24	Bryan Silas	SR² Motorsports	Toyota	SR² Motorsports
30	Nelson Piquet Jr.	Turner Scott Motorsports	Chevrolet	Worx Yard Tools
31	Justin Allgaier	Turner Scott Motorsports	Chevrolet	AccuDoc Solutions, Wolfpack Energy Sources
32	Kyle Larson	Turner Scott Motorsports	Chevrolet	Cessna
33	Ty Dillon	Richard Childress Racing	Chevrolet	Armour Vienna Sausage
40	Josh Wise	The Motorsports Group	Chevrolet	The Motorsports Group
42	J. J. Yeley	The Motorsports Group	Chevrolet	The Motorsports Group
43	Reed Sorenson	Richard Petty Motorsports	Ford	Pilot Travel Centers
44	Hal Martin	TriStar Motorsports	Toyota	American Custom Yachts
46	Chase Miller	The Motorsports Group	Chevrolet	The Motorsports Group
47	Jason Bowles	The Motorsports Group	Chevrolet	The Motorsports Group
51	Jeremy Clements	Jeremy Clements Racing	Chevrolet	USS James E. Williams (DDG-95) "Lead From The Front"
52	Kevin Lepage	Jimmy Means Racing	Toyota	Jimmy Means Racing
54	Kyle Busch	Joe Gibbs Racing	Toyota	Monster Energy
60	Travis Pastrana	Roush Fenway Racing	Ford	Roush Fenway Racing
70	Tony Raines	ML Motorsports	Toyota	ML Motorsports
73	Derrike Cope	Creation-Cope Racing	Chevrolet	Creation-Cope Racing
74	Danny Efland	Mike Harmon Racing	Chevrolet	Eurasia Entertainment Hotel & Resort
77	Parker Kligerman	Kyle Busch Motorsports	Toyota	Toyota
79	Kyle Fowler	Go Green Racing	Ford	Techniweld
87	Joe Nemechek	NEMCO Motorsports	Toyota	AM/FM Energy Wood & Pellet Stoves
92	Dexter Stacey	KH Motorsports	Ford	Maddie's Place Rocks
99	Alex Bowman	RAB Racing	Toyota	SchoolTipline
Official entry list

== Practice ==
The only practice session was held on Friday, May 10, at 8:30 AM EST, and would last for two hours. Brian Vickers of Joe Gibbs Racing would set the fastest time in the session, with a lap of 28.737 and an average speed of 171.124 miles per hour (275.397 km/h).

Pos.	#	Driver	Team	Make	Time	Speed
1	20	Brian Vickers	Joe Gibbs Racing	Toyota	28.737	171.124
2	11	Elliott Sadler	Joe Gibbs Racing	Toyota	28.865	170.365
3	7	Regan Smith	JR Motorsports	Chevrolet	28.878	170.289
Full practice results

== Qualifying ==
Qualifying was held on Friday, May 10, at 3:35 PM EST. Each driver would have two laps to set a fastest time; the fastest of the two would count as their official qualifying lap.

Kyle Busch of Joe Gibbs Racing would win the pole, setting a time of 28.494 and an average speed of 172.584 miles per hour (277.747 km/h).

Two drivers would fail to qualify: Jason Bowles and Derrike Cope.

=== Full qualifying results ===
Pos.	#	Driver	Team	Make	Time	Speed
1	54	Kyle Busch	Joe Gibbs Racing	Toyota	28.494	172.584
2	11	Elliott Sadler	Joe Gibbs Racing	Toyota	28.504	172.523
3	18	Matt Kenseth	Joe Gibbs Racing	Toyota	28.539	172.312
4	20	Brian Vickers	Joe Gibbs Racing	Toyota	28.570	172.125
5	31	Justin Allgaier	Turner Scott Motorsports	Chevrolet	28.716	171.249
6	5	Kasey Kahne	JR Motorsports	Chevrolet	28.718	171.238
7	32	Kyle Larson	Turner Scott Motorsports	Chevrolet	28.720	171.226
8	3	Austin Dillon	Richard Childress Racing	Chevrolet	28.724	171.202
9	12	Sam Hornish Jr.	Penske Racing	Ford	28.769	170.934
10	6	Trevor Bayne	Roush Fenway Racing	Ford	28.816	170.655
11	7	Regan Smith	JR Motorsports	Chevrolet	28.874	170.312
12	77	Parker Kligerman	Kyle Busch Motorsports	Toyota	28.886	170.242
13	99	Alex Bowman	RAB Racing	Toyota	28.889	170.224
14	22	Joey Logano	Penske Racing	Ford	28.932	169.971
15	33	Ty Dillon	Richard Childress Racing	Chevrolet	28.940	169.924
16	43	Reed Sorenson	Richard Petty Motorsports	Ford	29.002	169.561
17	60	Travis Pastrana	Roush Fenway Racing	Ford	29.017	169.473
18	16	Chris Buescher	Roush Fenway Racing	Ford	29.037	169.356
19	19	Mike Bliss	TriStar Motorsports	Toyota	29.043	169.321
20	4	Landon Cassill	JD Motorsports	Chevrolet	29.181	168.521
21	30	Nelson Piquet Jr.	Turner Scott Motorsports	Chevrolet	29.201	168.405
22	40	Josh Wise	The Motorsports Group	Chevrolet	29.453	166.964
23	42	J. J. Yeley	The Motorsports Group	Chevrolet	29.459	166.930
24	00	Blake Koch	SR² Motorsports	Toyota	29.501	166.693
25	01	Mike Wallace	JD Motorsports	Chevrolet	29.527	166.546
26	2	Brian Scott	Richard Childress Racing	Chevrolet	29.542	166.461
27	51	Jeremy Clements	Jeremy Clements Racing	Chevrolet	29.641	165.905
28	87	Joe Nemechek	NEMCO Motorsports	Toyota	29.644	165.889
29	17	Tanner Berryhill	Vision Racing	Toyota	29.646	165.877
30	92	Dexter Stacey	KH Motorsports	Ford	29.880	164.578
31	10	Jeff Green	TriStar Motorsports	Toyota	29.891	164.518
32	46	Chase Miller	The Motorsports Group	Chevrolet	29.913	164.397
33	79	Kyle Fowler	Go Green Racing	Ford	29.974	164.062
34	44	Hal Martin	TriStar Motorsports	Toyota	30.004	163.898
35	23	Harrison Rhodes	Rick Ware Racing	Ford	30.173	162.980
36	24	Bryan Silas	SR² Motorsports	Toyota	30.312	162.233
37	14	Eric McClure	TriStar Motorsports	Toyota	30.315	162.217
38	74	Danny Efland	Mike Harmon Racing	Chevrolet	30.419	161.662
Qualified by owner's points
39	70	Tony Raines	ML Motorsports	Toyota	31.109	158.076
Last car to qualify on time
40	52	Kevin Lepage	Jimmy Means Racing	Toyota	30.185	162.915
Failed to qualify or withdrew
41	47	Jason Bowles	The Motorsports Group	Chevrolet	30.455	161.471
42	73	Derrike Cope	Creation-Cope Racing	Chevrolet	32.851	149.694
WD	15	Stanton Barrett	Rick Ware Racing	Ford	—	—
Official starting lineup

== Race results ==
Fin	St	#	Driver	Team	Make	Laps	Led	Status	Pts	Winnings
1	1	54	Kyle Busch	Joe Gibbs Racing	Toyota	147	107	running	0	$44,965
2	2	11	Elliott Sadler	Joe Gibbs Racing	Toyota	147	0	running	42	$33,600
3	4	20	Brian Vickers	Joe Gibbs Racing	Toyota	147	0	running	41	$25,400
4	14	22	Joey Logano	Penske Racing	Ford	147	8	running	0	$17,450
5	3	18	Matt Kenseth	Joe Gibbs Racing	Toyota	147	27	running	0	$16,025
6	7	32	Kyle Larson	Turner Scott Motorsports	Chevrolet	147	0	running	38	$24,675
7	11	7	Regan Smith	JR Motorsports	Chevrolet	147	0	running	37	$20,410
8	9	12	Sam Hornish Jr.	Penske Racing	Ford	147	0	running	36	$19,270
9	6	5	Kasey Kahne	JR Motorsports	Chevrolet	147	1	running	0	$12,975
10	5	31	Justin Allgaier	Turner Scott Motorsports	Chevrolet	147	0	running	34	$19,925
11	8	3	Austin Dillon	Richard Childress Racing	Chevrolet	147	0	running	33	$18,525
12	18	16	Chris Buescher	Roush Fenway Racing	Ford	147	0	running	32	$12,450
13	15	33	Ty Dillon	Richard Childress Racing	Chevrolet	147	0	running	0	$18,400
14	26	2	Brian Scott	Richard Childress Racing	Chevrolet	147	0	running	30	$18,350
15	12	77	Parker Kligerman	Kyle Busch Motorsports	Toyota	147	0	running	29	$19,475
16	21	30	Nelson Piquet Jr.	Turner Scott Motorsports	Chevrolet	147	0	running	28	$18,175
17	13	99	Alex Bowman	RAB Racing	Toyota	147	0	running	27	$18,125
18	16	43	Reed Sorenson	Richard Petty Motorsports	Ford	147	0	running	26	$18,075
19	19	19	Mike Bliss	TriStar Motorsports	Toyota	146	0	running	25	$18,025
20	27	51	Jeremy Clements	Jeremy Clements Racing	Chevrolet	146	1	running	25	$18,625
21	22	40	Josh Wise	The Motorsports Group	Chevrolet	146	0	running	23	$17,900
22	24	00	Blake Koch	SR² Motorsports	Toyota	146	0	running	22	$17,850
23	20	4	Landon Cassill	JD Motorsports	Chevrolet	146	1	running	0	$17,800
24	28	87	Joe Nemechek	NEMCO Motorsports	Toyota	146	0	running	20	$17,750
25	25	01	Mike Wallace	JD Motorsports	Chevrolet	146	0	running	19	$18,155
26	37	14	Eric McClure	TriStar Motorsports	Toyota	144	0	running	18	$17,625
27	38	74	Danny Efland	Mike Harmon Racing	Chevrolet	144	0	running	17	$17,575
28	17	60	Travis Pastrana	Roush Fenway Racing	Ford	144	0	running	16	$17,500
29	34	44	Hal Martin	TriStar Motorsports	Toyota	143	1	running	16	$17,465
30	30	92	Dexter Stacey	KH Motorsports	Ford	142	0	running	14	$17,725
31	35	23	Harrison Rhodes	Rick Ware Racing	Ford	141	0	running	0	$17,375
32	10	6	Trevor Bayne	Roush Fenway Racing	Ford	140	0	running	12	$17,345
33	39	70	Tony Raines	ML Motorsports	Toyota	139	1	running	12	$17,315
34	33	79	Kyle Fowler	Go Green Racing	Ford	108	0	crash	10	$17,285
35	40	52	Kevin Lepage	Jimmy Means Racing	Toyota	27	0	rear gear	9	$11,229
36	36	24	Bryan Silas	SR² Motorsports	Toyota	21	0	crash	0	$16,520
37	31	10	Jeff Green	TriStar Motorsports	Toyota	16	0	vibration	7	$10,500
38	23	42	J. J. Yeley	The Motorsports Group	Chevrolet	7	0	rear gear	0	$10,426
39	32	46	Chase Miller	The Motorsports Group	Chevrolet	4	0	overheating	5	$10,315
40	29	17	Tanner Berryhill	Vision Racing	Toyota	3	0	rear gear	4	$10,290
Failed to qualify
41		47	Jason Bowles	The Motorsports Group	Chevrolet					
42		73	Derrike Cope	Creation-Cope Racing	Chevrolet					
WD		15	Stanton Barrett	Rick Ware Racing	Ford					
Official race results

Previous race: 2013 Aaron's 312	NASCAR Nationwide Series; 2013 season	Next race: 2013 History 300
