= AdvoCare =

American dietary supplement company

Coordinates: 33.01053°N 96.676928°W

AdvoCare International
- Type: Private
- Industry: Dietary supplements
- Founded: 1993; 33 years ago in Carrollton, Texas
- Founder: Charles E. Ragus
- Headquarters: Richardson, Texas, United States
- Area served: United States
- Key people: Christina Helwig (CEO)
- Products: Dietary supplements, personal care
- Revenue: US$ 400 million (est.) (2013)
- Number of employees: 247 (est.) (2013)
- Website: www.advocare.com

AdvoCare International, LLC is an American dietary supplement company, headquartered in Richardson, Texas. They develop and distribute a range of wellness products, including energy, hydration, gut health, immune support, and sports performance products. Founded in 1993 by Charles E. Ragus as a multi-level marketing model. In 2019, AdvoCare transitioned to a consumer omnichannel model after being charged with operating a pyramid scheme in 2018.

== History ==
Charles Ragus founded AdvoCare in 1993 as a multi-level marketing (MLM) company to distribute dietary supplement products. The name AdvoCare is short for "Advocates Who Care". Before founding AdvoCare, Ragus worked as a regional vice president for Fidelity Union Insurance, and as a MLM distributor for Herbalife. He had initially founded the MLM company Omnitrition International in 1989. Ragus was in training camp with the National Football League's Kansas City Chiefs in the 1960s. He died in 2001 at the age of 58.

In May 2007, Richard H. Wright became president and CEO of AdvoCare. He had previously served as Chief of Staff for US Representative Jim McCrery.

In October 2019, the FTC ruled that Advocare had operated as an illegal pyramid scheme. AdvoCare did not admit to or deny allegations but did agree to change how they did business. According to the FTC, AdvoCare rewarded distributors for recruiting other distributors to spend large sums of money pursuing the business opportunity. The majority of distributors either made no money or lost money. AdvoCare and its former chief executive agreed to pay $150 million to compensate some distributors and buy back unsold inventory from distributors who chose to leave. They also agreed to a ban from all multi-level marketing. Two of AdvoCare’s top promoters also settled with the FTC for $4 million, most of which was suspended, based upon their inability to pay, and were also banned from multi-level marketing. In a statement, former CEO Patrick Wright denied the company had operated as a pyramid scheme. Prior to the settlement, Advocare voluntarily moved from a multi-level marketing model to a single-level distribution or direct sales model.

In May 2024, AdvoCare appointed Christina Helwig as its first female CEO. That same year, Helwig received recognition from the Dallas Business Journal for her leadership, and the company was named one of the "Best Places to Work" in Dallas. AdvoCare also continued its philanthropic activities through the AdvoCare Foundation, which awarded $330,000 in grants to nonprofits supporting families and children in 2024. The following year in June 2025, Brad Pace was appointed as Vice President of Regulatory & Compliance.

== Business ==
AdvoCare sells dietary supplements and related products, such as an energy drink. AdvoCare also sells products under the brand names Trim, Active, Well, Performance Elite, Fit, and 24 Day Challenge.

In March 2016, Advocare was the subject of an article in ESPN The Magazine. The article argued that the company and a small number of distributors made most of their money from the signing-up of new distributors rather than sales of the product. It also argued that these individuals exaggerated the likelihood of financial success of distributors, and created an atmosphere of not questioning the company's claims. The article noted that some people in the company focused on religious affiliation as part of its business model, with more devout members of the organization using it to gain and hold power in the organization and over its members.

Prior to July 2019, AdvoCare was determined to be a multi-level marketing company. The FTC defines multilevel marketing as a “form of direct sales in which a distributor sells products or services through a network of independent salespeople.” However, after July 2019, citing closed-door discussions with the Federal Trade Commission, AdvoCare voluntarily ceased operating the multi-level aspect of its business, and instead began only compensating distributors for sales of products to consumers.

As of October 2019, AdvoCare is a member of the U.S. Direct Selling Association (DSA).

In 2019, it sold its Plano office to Opex Corp.

== Sponsorships and endorsements ==
According to the U.S. Federal Trade Commission, Advocare used endorsements from professional athletes, title sponsorship of professional sporting events, conferences, podcasts, and more to pitch what it called a life-changing business opportunity, but that the FTC alleged was a pyramid scheme.

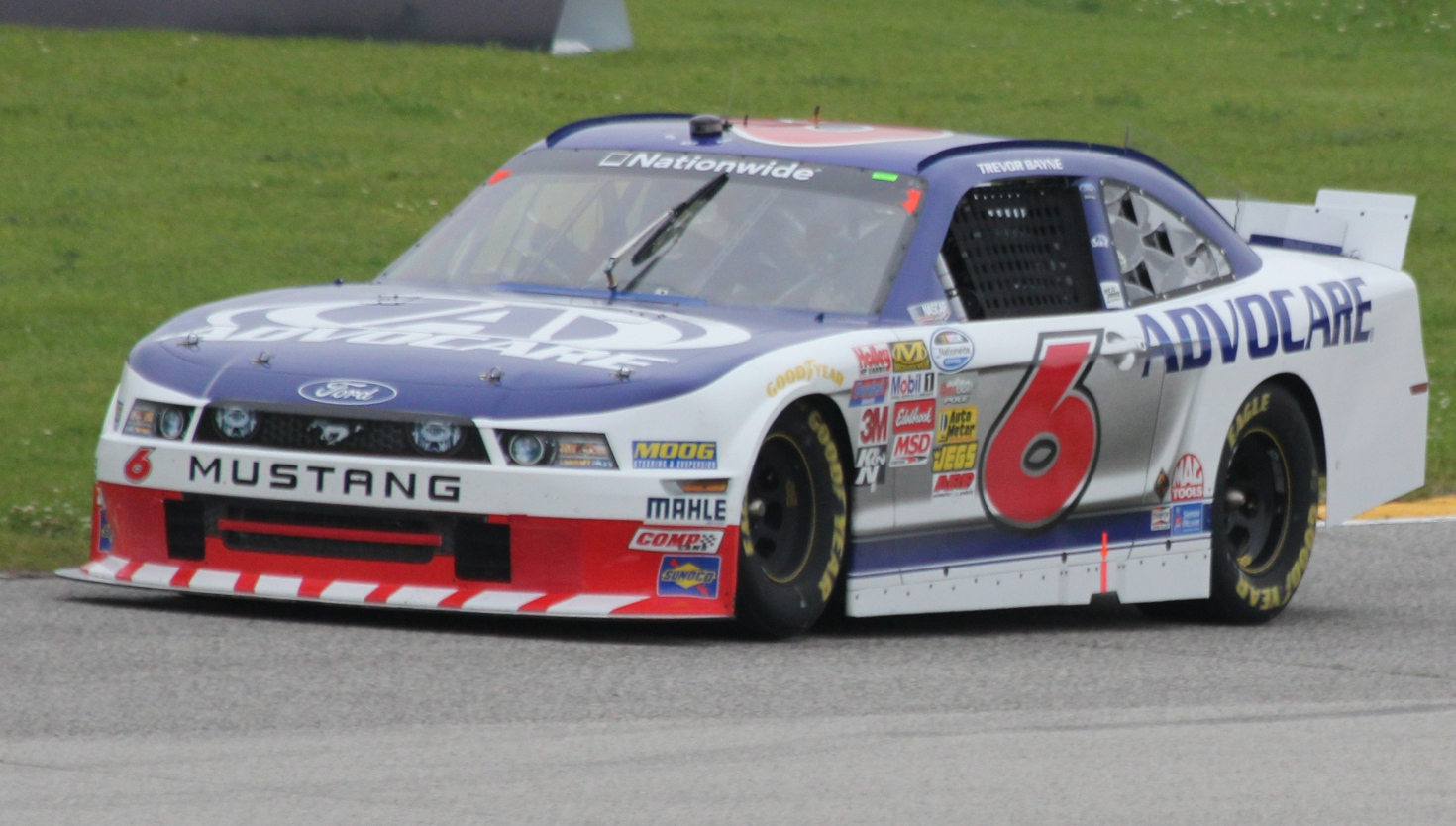
Trevor Bayne's AdvoCare-branded Ford Mustang in NASCAR competition

AdvoCare's contracted celebrity endorsers have included soccer player Carli Lloyd; Major League Baseball pitcher Doug Fister; CrossFit champion Rich Froning; NFL players Andy Dalton, Philip Rivers, Alex Smith, Sam Bradford, Wes Welker, and New Orleans Saints quarterback Drew Brees, who was described by ESPN as the face of the company. ESPN The Magazine described celebrity endorsers as central to "the Bulletproof Shield," a sales and recruitment technique used by the company to deflect questions about the product. In this technique, distributors place themselves at the center of a chart illustrating the company's endorsements and members of its scientific and medical advisory board, and deflects questions about the company by replying, "Well, I don't know about (X), but what I do know is" that particular athletes or doctors have endorsed AdvoCare.

AdvoCare ceased offering KickStart Spark, targeted to youth age 4–11, after pediatricians had expressed concerns about the product containing 60 mg of caffeine. AdvoCare was also the subject of criticism for its marketing at youth athletic events. In 2005, the company paid $5,000 to sponsor a high school wrestling tournament in Sacramento but after negative publicity, AdvoCare officials said they would not sponsor any more school events.

From 2009 until 2013, AdvoCare was the title sponsor of the Independence Bowl in Shreveport, Louisiana. The 2013 game was known as the AdvoCare V100 Bowl. In 2012, AdvoCare partnered with the Major League Soccer team FC Dallas and became its jersey sponsor. In 2020, the company switched to become the team’s sleeve sponsor.

In 2014, AdvoCare purchased the naming rights of a professional sports practice facility located at The Greenbrier in West Virginia. The facility was named the AdvoCare Sports Performance Center and hosted the 2014 training camp for the New Orleans Saints. AdvoCare also became the title sponsor of the 2014 Texas Bowl. In 2016, AdvoCare was to sponsor the Texas Kickoff and Cowboys Classic games.

From 2011 to 2016, AdvoCare sponsored several NASCAR racing teams and drivers, including Trevor Bayne and Roush Fenway Racing in the NASCAR Sprint Cup Series and Xfinity Series, as well as races at Atlanta Motor Speedway and Phoenix International Raceway.

== Tainted products claim ==
In July 2008, Olympic swimmer Jessica Hardy tested positive for the banned breathing enhancer, clenbuterol. Hardy said she had never heard of the substance, attributing the positive result to either a tainted supplement or sabotage. At the time, Hardy had been taking the supplement Arginine Extreme, which she had received for free from AdvoCare in exchange for making product testimonials, and she claimed in a subsequent lawsuit that the company's product was tainted. AdvoCare sued Hardy for making false claims. An arbitration hearing reduced Hardy's suspension after a scientific expert testified that the AdvoCare product was tainted. AdvoCare disputed the panel's findings, citing the fact that two independent laboratories had not found any evidence of Clenbuterol in the supplements. Hardy was cleared to compete again in 2010.

== Deceptive practices lawsuit ==
In 2009, a Dallas County jury awarded $1.9 million in damages against AdvoCare after finding that the company had engaged in deceptive trade practices and unfairly canceled agreements with two of its distributors. According to the lawsuit, litigants Bruce and Teresa Badgett of Arlington, Texas, had been active and profitable marketers of AdvoCare products for more than a dozen years before their distributorship was canceled by the company in 2006 "based upon vague and trumped-up charges." The jury found that AdvoCare engaged in false, misleading, or deceptive practices that damaged the Badgetts and that the termination provisions of the distributor contract with AdvoCare were unconscionable, according to court documents. AdvoCare disputed the ruling and on April 30, 2010, filed to appeal the decision on the basis that the plaintiffs were not customers and therefore did not fit the statutory definition necessary to be covered under the Texas Deceptive Trade Practices-Consumer Protection Act. The appeal was dismissed on March 13, 2012, and the company was ordered to reimburse the Badgett's for court costs related to their defense in the appeal case.

== See also ==
- List of food companies
