= Tanner Berryhill =

American racing driver

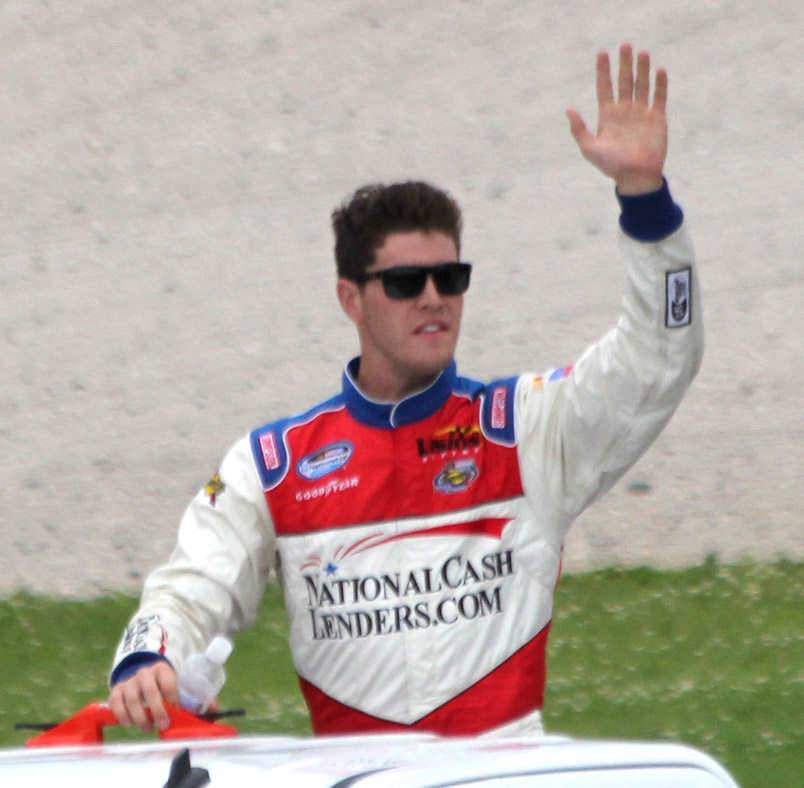
- Berryhill at Road America in 2014
- Born: Tanner Blake Berryhill; November 29, 1993 (age 32); Bixby, Oklahoma, U.S.
- Awards: 2021 POWRi Lucas Oil West Midget Series Rookie of the Year

NASCAR Cup Series career
- 2 races run over 1 year
- 2018 position: 44th
- Best finish: 44th (2018)
- First race: 2018 Can-Am 500 (Phoenix)
- Last race: 2018 Ford EcoBoost 400 (Homestead)
Wins	Top tens	Poles
0	0	0

NASCAR O'Reilly Auto Parts Series career
- 43 races run over 6 years
- 2021 position: 64th
- Best finish: 22nd (2014)
- First race: 2012 Virginia 529 College Savings 250 (Richmond)
- Last race: 2021 Andy's Frozen Custard 335 (Texas)
Wins	Top tens	Poles
0	0	0
- Statistics up to date as of December 27, 2021.

Tanner Blake Berryhill (born November 29, 1993) is an American professional stock car racing driver who competes for Berryhill Racing in the Carolina Sprint Tour in the Maxim #17. He has also competed in the NASCAR Cup Series, NASCAR Xfinity Series, ARCA Menards Series, and ARCA Menards Series East in the past.

== Racing career ==
Berryhill is a veteran of Legends and midget car racing. He made his debut in NASCAR competition in 2011, driving in seven K&N Pro Series East races before moving to the Nationwide Series in 2012.

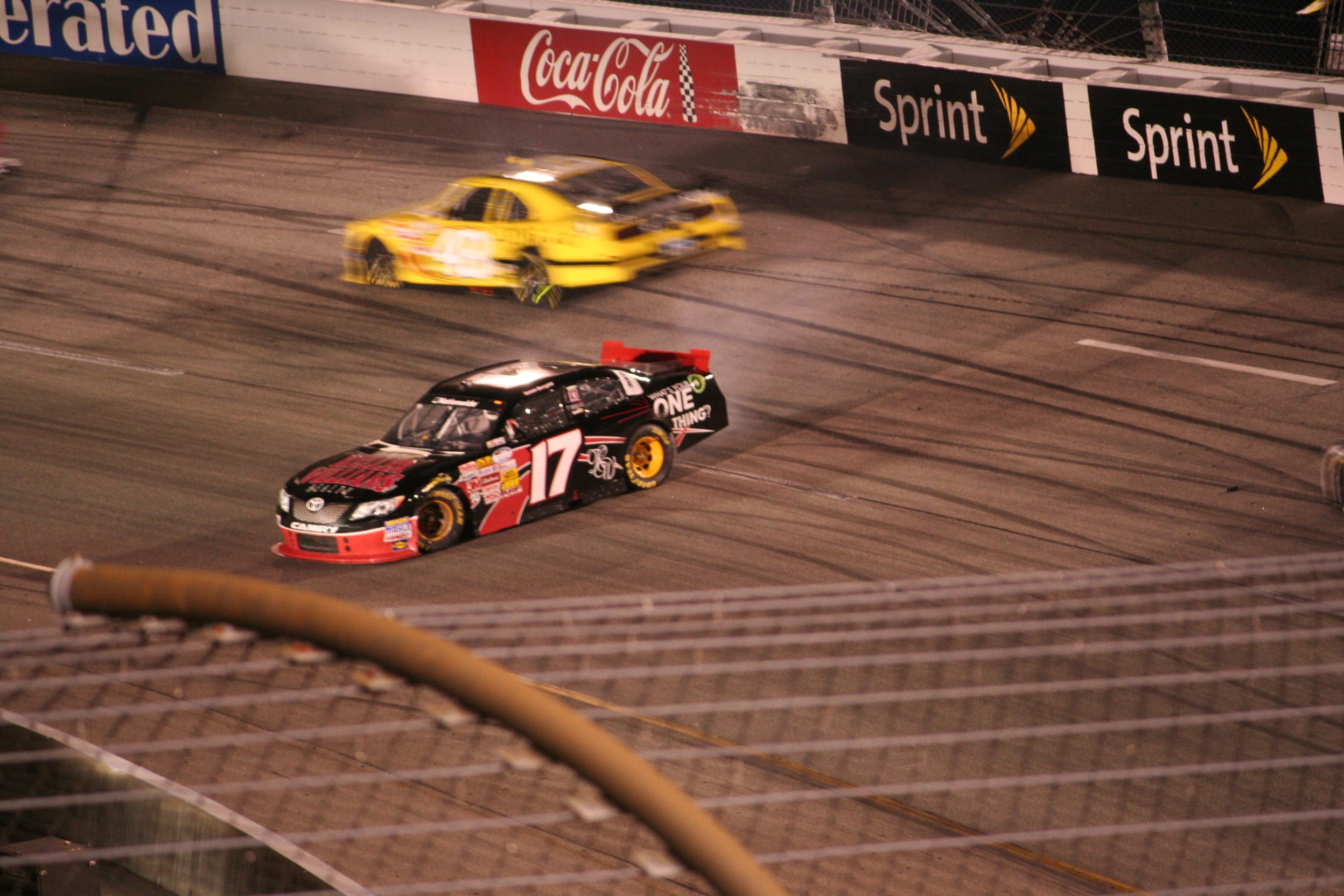
Berryhill's 2013 car spinning out at Richmond International Raceway

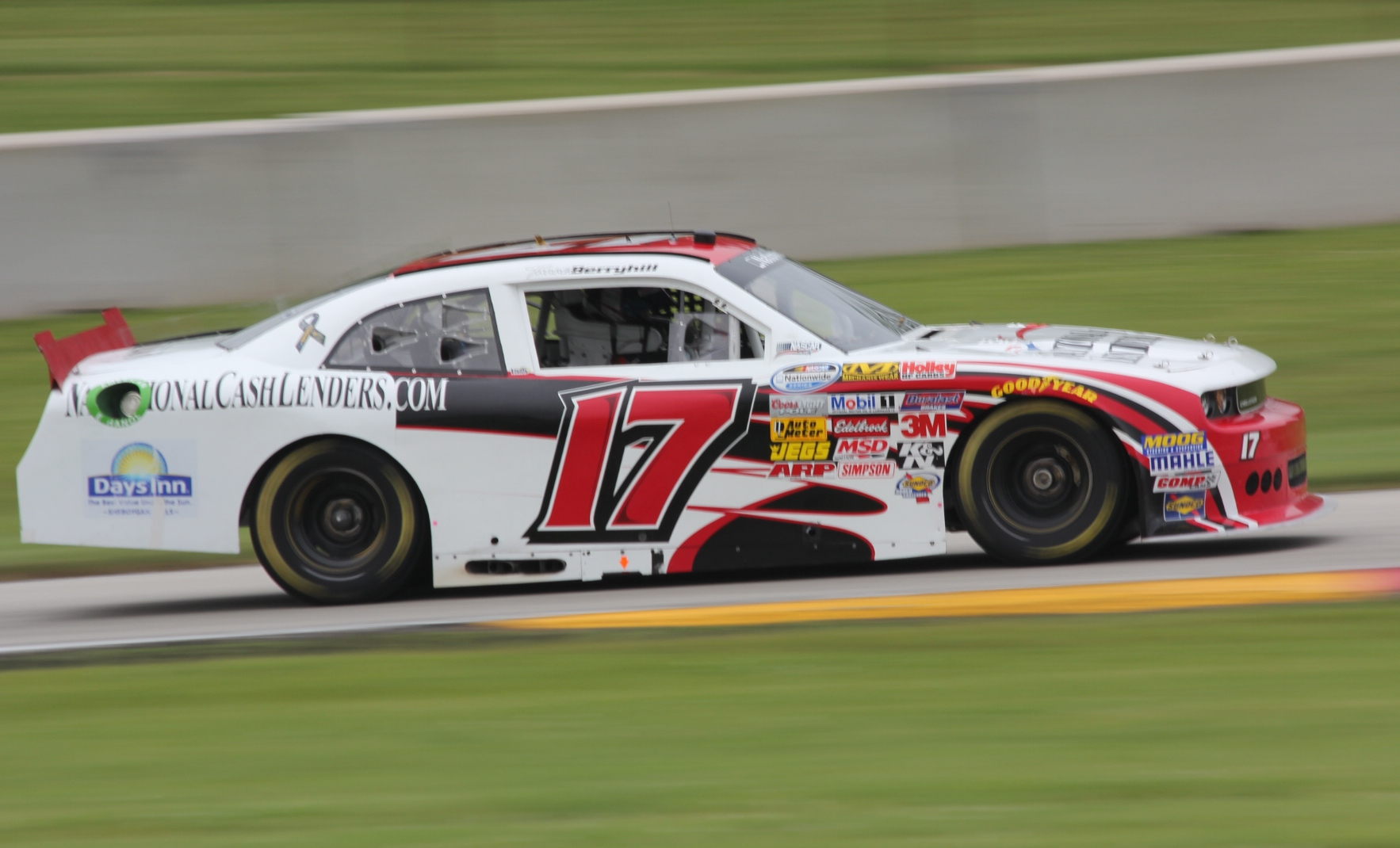
2014 Nationwide car at Road America

In 2014, Berryhill ran the whole season with Vision Racing. During qualifying at Talladega, Berryhill was involved in a single-car accident when Kyle Larson came down into him. He would be replaced by Chad Boat, as he and Billy Boat Motorsports used the No. 17 owner points to qualify into the race. His best finish was a seventeenth place finish at Mid-Ohio. Berryhill would finish 22nd in points.

In March 2015, Berryhill announced his attempt to make his Sprint Cup Series debut in the CampingWorld.com 500 at Phoenix International Raceway, driving the No. 66 Premium Motorsports Chevrolet SS. A successful attempt would have made him the first Oklahoma driver in NASCAR's highest division in 34 years. However, he failed to qualify. Berryhill returned to the team for the Sprint All-Star Race's Sprint Showdown, finishing 27th and 21st in the two segments.

After being absent from NASCAR for a few years, on September 21, 2018, it was announced that Berryhill would attempt the Charlotte Roval race in the No. 97 car for Obaika Racing. However, he did not qualify for the race.

On November 6, 2018, Berryhill announced he would drive the No. 97 Toyota for Obaika Racing at Phoenix, where he made his first Cup Series qualifying attempt three years prior. He started the race 36th but was involved in an accident and did not finish the race, scoring in 31st. He would also compete in the following race, the season finale at Homestead-Miami. He would finish the race, albeit thirteen laps down in the 38th position. On December 3, he stated that he would be running the full 2019 Cup schedule with Obaika, though the team skipped the 2019 Daytona 500 due to funding issues. Originally the Obaika team was scheduled to return the following race, but the team instead temporarily suspended operations after briefly being on the entry list for the race at Texas Motor Speedway. Berryhill departed the team shortly thereafter.

On May 3, 2021, it was announced that Berryhill would return to NASCAR after spending the previous two years without a ride, and would drive the No. 23 for Our Motorsports at Darlington in May and both races at Texas. He would perform well at Darlington, finishing 21st and on the lead lap but crashed out of both Texas races.

== Motorsports career results ==
=== NASCAR ===
(key) (Bold – Pole position awarded by qualifying time. Italics – Pole position earned by points standings or practice time. * – Most laps led.)

==== Monster Energy Cup Series ====
Monster Energy NASCAR Cup Series results
Year	Team	No.	Make	1	2	3	4	5	6	7	8	9	10	11	12	13	14	15	16	17	18	19	20	21	22	23	24	25	26	27	28	29	30	31	32	33	34	35	36	MENCC	Pts	Ref
2015	Premium Motorsports	66	Chevy	DAY	ATL	LVS	PHO; DNQ	CAL	MAR	TEX	BRI	RCH	TAL	KAN	CLT	DOV	POC	MCH	SON	DAY	KEN	NHA	IND	POC	GLN	MCH	BRI	DAR	RCH	CHI	NHA	DOV	CLT	KAN	TAL	MAR	TEX	PHO	HOM	76th	-	
2018	Obaika Racing	97	Toyota	DAY	ATL	LVS	PHO	CAL	MAR	TEX	BRI	RCH	TAL	DOV	KAN	CLT	POC	MCH	SON	CHI	DAY	KEN	NHA	POC	GLN	MCH	BRI	DAR	IND	LVS	RCH	ROV	DOV	TAL	KAN	MAR	TEX	PHO; 31	HOM; 38	44th	7	

==== Xfinity Series ====
NASCAR Xfinity Series results
Year	Team	No.	Make	1	2	3	4	5	6	7	8	9	10	11	12	13	14	15	16	17	18	19	20	21	22	23	24	25	26	27	28	29	30	31	32	33	NXSC	Pts	Ref
2012	SR² Motorsports	24	Chevy	DAY	PHO	LVS	BRI	CAL	TEX	RCH; 29	TAL	DAR	IOW	CLT	DOV	MCH	ROA																				53rd	64	
2012	Vision Racing	17	Toyota															KEN; 28	DAY	NHA	CHI; 26	IND	IOW	GLN	CGV	BRI	ATL	RCH; 35	CHI								53rd	64	
2012	SR² Motorsports	00	Toyota																											KEN; 38	DOV	CLT	KAN	TEX	PHO	HOM	53rd	64	
2013	Vision Racing	17	Toyota	DAY	PHO	LVS	BRI	CAL	TEX	RCH; 28	TAL	DAR; 40	CLT; DNQ	DOV	IOW	MCH	ROA	KEN	DAY	NHA	CHI; 35	IND; 29	IOW	GLN	MOH	BRI	ATL	RCH									58th	52	
2013	Vision Racing	37	Dodge																										CHI; 37	KEN	DOV	KAN					58th	52	
2013	Vision Racing	17	Dodge																														CLT; 29	TEX	PHO	HOM	58th	52	
2014	Vision Racing	17	Dodge	DAY; DNQ	PHO; 28	LVS; 25	BRI; 36	CAL; 31	TEX; 30	DAR; 27	RCH; 35	TAL; QL^{†}	IOW; 35	CLT; 40	DOV; 29	MCH; 36	ROA; 28	KEN; 38	DAY; 36	NHA; 27	CHI; 29	IND; 30	IOW; 35	GLN; 31	MOH; 17	BRI; 36	ATL; 23	RCH; DNQ	CHI; 34	KEN; 34	DOV; 34	KAN; DNQ					22nd	365	
2014	Vision Racing	17	Toyota																														CLT; 37	TEX; 27	PHO; 33	HOM; 31	22nd	365	
2015	Vision Racing	17	Toyota	DAY; DNQ	ATL	LVS	PHO	CAL	TEX	BRI	RCH	TAL	IOW	CLT	DOV	MCH	CHI	DAY	KEN	NHA	IND	IOW	GLN	MOH	BRI	ROA	DAR	RCH	CHI	KEN	DOV	CLT	KAN	TEX	PHO	HOM	119th	0^{1}	
2018	Obaika Racing	97	Chevy	DAY	ATL	LVS	PHO	CAL	TEX	BRI	RCH	TAL	DOV	CLT	POC	MCH	IOW	CHI	DAY	KEN	NHA	IOW	GLN	MOH	BRI	ROA	DAR	IND	LVS	RCH	ROV; DNQ	DOV	KAN	TEX	PHO	HOM	N/A	0	
2021	Our Motorsports	23	Chevy	DAY	DRC	HOM	LVS	PHO	ATL	MAR	TAL	DAR; 21	DOV	COA	CLT	MOH	TEX; 39	NSH	POC	ROA	ATL	NHA	GLN	IRC	MCH	DAY	DAR	RCH	BRI	LVS	TAL	ROV	TEX; 37	KAN	MAR	PHO	64th	18	
^{†} - Qualified but replaced by Chad Boat

^{*} Season still in progress
^{1} Ineligible for series points

==== K&N Pro Series East ====
NASCAR K&N Pro Series East results
Year	Team	No.	Make	1	2	3	4	5	6	7	8	9	10	11	12	NKNPSEC	Pts	Ref
2011	Vision Racing	97	Chevy	GRE; 31	SBO; 30	RCH; 35	IOW	BGS	JFC; 18						DOV; 20	28th	616	
2011	Vision Racing	97	Ford							LGY; 20	NHA	COL	GRE; 21	NHA		28th	616	

=== ARCA Racing Series ===
(key) (Bold – Pole position awarded by qualifying time. Italics – Pole position earned by points standings or practice time. * – Most laps led.)

ARCA Racing Series results
Year	Team	No.	Make	1	2	3	4	5	6	7	8	9	10	11	12	13	14	15	16	17	18	19	20	ARSC	Pts	Ref
2010	Bobby Gerhart Racing	7	Chevy	DAY	PBE	SLM	TEX	TAL	TOL	POC	MCH	IOW; 40	MFD	POC	BLN	NJE	ISF	CHI	DSF	TOL	SLM	KAN	CAR; 22	100th	145	

=== CARS Super Late Model Tour ===
(key)

CARS Super Late Model Tour results
Year	Team	No.	Make	1	2	3	4	5	6	7	8	9	10	CSLMTC	Pts	Ref
2016	TB Racing	17B	Chevy	SNM	ROU	HCY; 13	**TCM**; 19	GRE	ROU; 20	CON	MYB	HCY	SNM	32nd	48	
