= Vision Racing (NASCAR) =

Former NASCAR team

- Owner: Adrian Berryhill
- Base: Mooresville, North Carolina
- Series: NASCAR Xfinity Series; NASCAR K&N Pro Series East; ARCA Re/Max Series
- Race drivers: 17. Benny Gordon
- Manufacturer: Chevrolet; Toyota; Dodge
- Opened: 2005
- Closed: 2015

Career
- Debut: Xfinity Series: 2006 O'Reilly Challenge (Texas)
- Latest race: Xfinity Series: 2015 Winn-Dixie 300 (Talladega)
- Races competed: Total: 56; Xfinity Series: 47; ARCA Re/Max Series: 9
- Drivers' Championships: Total: 0 Xfinity Series: 0 ARCA Re/Max Series: 0
- Race victories: Total: 0 Xfinity Series: 0 ARCA Re/Max Series: 0
- Pole positions: Total: 0 Xfinity Series: 0 ARCA Re/Max Series: 0

Vision Racing was an American professional stock car racing team that last competed in the NASCAR Xfinity Series and the ARCA Re/Max Series. The team last fielded the No. 17 Toyota Camry for Benny Gordon in the NASCAR Xfinity Series. The team previously used Dodge Challenger cars and engines previously run by Team Penske before 2012, as well as Toyotas from Joe Gibbs Racing. After Tanner Berryhill failed to qualify Daytona Xfinity race in 2015, the team decided to shut down due to lack of sponsorship, running its final race at Talladega in May with Benny Gordon.

Following Talladega, Gordon and business partner Larry Mostoller purchased the team to form Performance Energy Group.

== History ==
Vision Racing ran in the ARCA Racing Series in 2005, running at Nashville and Kentucky with Zach Chappel and at Pocono with Damon Lusk. Lusk also ran the season opening ARCA race at Daytona in 2006. Will Vaught ran a No. 13 car at Kansas, then the No. 37 at Gateway. The team began running the No. 37 Chevy in the then-Busch Series in 2006, debuting with Josh Krug at Richmond International Raceway in September. Randy LaJoie drove at Kansas in September and Texas in November, before Krug ran at Phoenix.

In 2010, Berryhill ran the ARCA race at Iowa in the No. 7 Nation Cash Lenders Chevy. In 2011, he ran 7 races in the K&N Pro Series East in the No. 97 Chevy.

=== 2012 ===
The Nationwide team did not run again until 2012. At Richmond in April, J. J. Yeley ran the No. 17 Toyota Camry, while Tanner Berryhill ran the No. 24 Chevrolet Impala, both with sponsorship from New Gulf Resources. Berryhill finished 29th while Yeley finished 37th. Berryhill ran three more races in the No. 17 with a best finish of 26th at Chicago.

=== 2013 ===
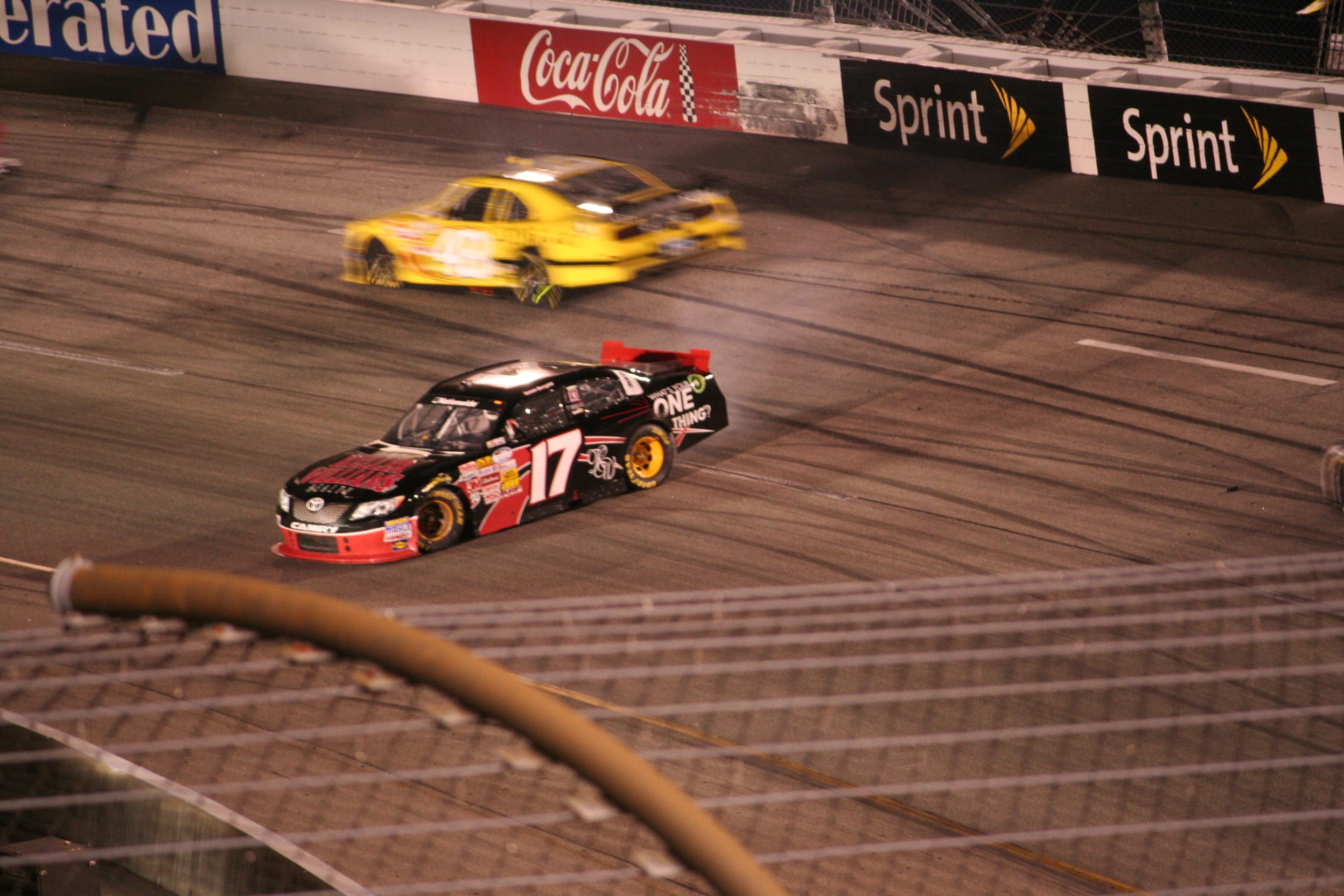
Berryhill's 2013 car at Richmond

The team ran the No. 17 and No. 37 in a limited schedule with sponsorship from National Cash Lenders. Berryhill ran 5 races in the 17 and one in the No. 37. Matt DiBenedetto ran 5 races in the No. 37. The team's best finish was a 28th at Richmond in April with Berryhill. Midway through the season, the team switched to Dodge, which had pulled factory support from NASCAR, and began running R6 engines from former Dodge team Team Penske at Charlotte.

=== 2014 ===
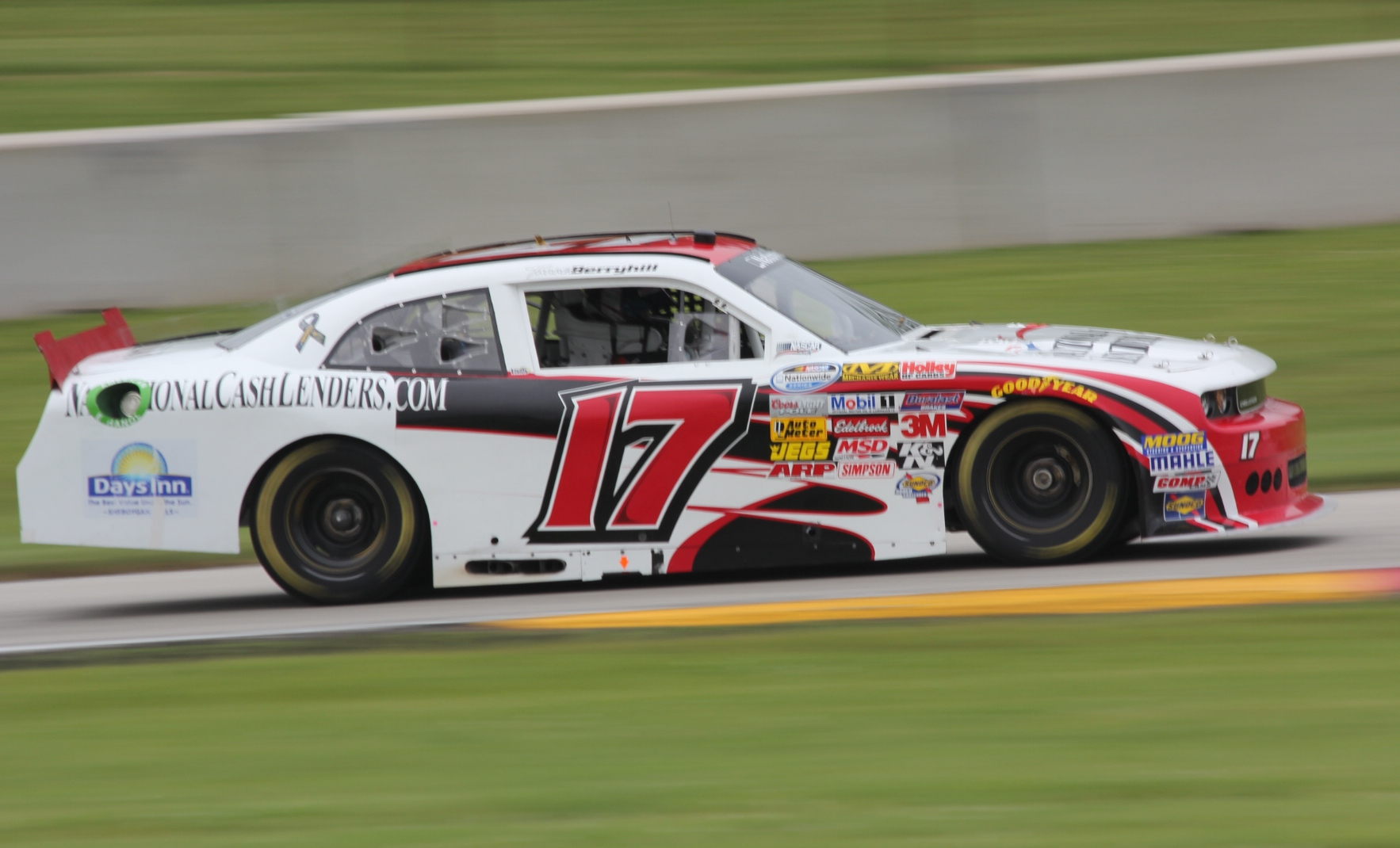
Berryhill's 2014 car at Road America

In 2014, Tanner Berryhill ran the full season for Rookie of the Year in the No. 17. BWP Bats sponsored the first six races of the season. The 17 and DiBenedetto in the No. 37 both missed the season opener at Daytona. At Talladega, Chad Boat and Billy Boat Motorsports missed the race, then made a deal to run the 17 in the race using their own car, finishing 25th. At Mid-Ohio, Berryhill got the team's best finish of 2014 with a lead-lap finish of 17th.

Ryan Ellis tweeted on August 19 that he would run the No. 37 car at Bristol, but failed to qualify. Berryhill would finish 22nd in points.

=== 2015 ===
The No. 17 and Berryhill planned to run the full 2015 season pending sponsorship, with the team purchasing Toyota Camrys from Joe Gibbs Racing. After crashing in qualifying for the season opener at Daytona, however, the team shut down due to financial woes. The team was later put up for sale by owner Adrian Berryhill.

In April, the team announced it would be fielding the 17 Toyota at Talladega in May, if a driver with $45,000 of sponsorship funds could be found. The car would be run by Benny Gordon and VSI Racing, qualifying 25th and finishing 13th. Gordon has since bought the team and rebranded it as PEG Racing.

==== Car No. 17 results ====
NASCAR Xfinity Series results
Year	Driver	No.	Make	1	2	3	4	5	6	7	8	9	10	11	12	13	14	15	16	17	18	19	20	21	22	23	24	25	26	27	28	29	30	31	32	33	Owners	Pts
2012	J. J. Yeley	17	Toyota	DAY	PHO	LVS	BRI	CAL	TEX	RCH; 29	TAL	DAR	IOW	CLT	DOV	MCH	ROA																				57th	50
2012	Tanner Berryhill	17	Toyota															KEN; 28	DAY	NHA	CHI; 26	IND	IOW	GLN	CGV	BRI	ATL	RCH; 35	CHI	KEN	DOV	CLT	KAN	TEX	PHO	HOM	57th	50
2013	Tanner Berryhill	17	Toyota	DAY	PHO	LVS	BRI	CAL	TEX	RCH; 28	TAL	DAR; 40	CLT; DNQ	DOV	IOW	MCH	ROA	KEN	DAY	NHA	CHI; 35	IND; 29	IOW	GLN	MOH												53rd	45
2013	Tanner Berryhill	17	Dodge																														CLT; 29	TEX	PHO	HOM	53rd	45
2013	David Starr	17	Toyota																							BRI; DNQ	ATL	RCH	CHI	KEN	DOV	KAN					53rd	45
2014	Tanner Berryhill	17	Dodge	DAY; DNQ	PHO; 28	LVS; 25	BRI; 36	CAL; 31	TEX; 30	DAR; 27	RCH; 35	TAL; QL	IOW; 35	CLT; 40	DOV; 29	MCH; 36	ROA; 28	KEN; 38	DAY; 36	NHA; 27	CHI; 29	IND; 30	IOW; 35	GLN; 31	MOH; 17	BRI; 36	ATL; 23	RCH; DNQ	CHI; 34	KEN; 34	DOV; 34	KAN; DNQ					34th	384
2014	Tanner Berryhill	17	Toyota																														CLT; 37	TEX; 27	PHO; 33	HOM; 31	34th	384
2015	Tanner Berryhill	17	Toyota	DAY; DNQ	ATL	LVS	PHO	CAL	TEX	BRI	RCH																										54th	0
2015	Benny Gordon	17	Toyota									TAL; 13	IOW	CLT	DOV	MCH	CHI	DAY	KEN	NHA	IND	IOW	GLN	MOH	BRI	ROA	DAR	RCH	CHI	KEN	DOV	CLT	KAN	TEX	PHO	HOM	54th	0

==== Car No. 37 results ====
NASCAR Nationwide Series results
Year	Driver	No.	Make	1	2	3	4	5	6	7	8	9	10	11	12	13	14	15	16	17	18	19	20	21	22	23	24	25	26	27	28	29	30	31	32	33	34	35	Owners	Pts
2006	Josh Krug	37	Chevy	DAY	CAL	MXC	LVS	ATL	BRI	TEX	NSH	PHO	TAL	RCH	DAR	CLT	DOV	NSH	KEN	MLW	DAY	CHI	NHA	MAR	GTY	IRP	GLN	MCH	BRI	CAL	RCH; DNQ	DOV					PHO; DNQ	HOM	N/A	40
2006	Randy LaJoie	37	Chevy																														KAN; DNQ	CLT	MEM	TEX; 41			N/A	40
2013	Matt DiBenedetto	37	Dodge	DAY	PHO	LVS	BRI	CAL	TEX	RCH	TAL	DAR	CLT; DNQ	DOV; 39	IOW	MCH	ROA	KEN	DAY	NHA	CHI; 39	IND; DNQ	IOW	GLN	MOH	BRI; 37	ATL; 33	RCH; 37											55th	30
2013	Tanner Berryhill	37	Dodge																										CHI; 37	KEN	DOV	KAN	CLT	TEX	PHO	HOM			55th	30
2014	Matt DiBenedetto	37	Dodge	DAY; DNQ	PHO	LVS	BRI	CAL	TEX	DAR	RCH	TAL	IOW	CLT	DOV	MCH	ROA	KEN	DAY	NHA	CHI	IND	IOW	GLN	MOH														66th	0
2014	Ryan Ellis	37	Dodge																							BRI; DNQ	ATL	RCH	CHI	KEN	DOV	KAN	CLT	TEX	PHO	HOM			66th	0
