= 2012 Subway Jalapeño 250 =

Race details
- Map of Speedway
- Date: July 6, 2012
- Official name: 2012 Subway Jalapeño 250
- Location: Daytona International Speedway in Daytona Beach, Florida
- Course: Tri-oval
- Course length: 2.5 miles (4.023 km)
- Distance: 101 laps, 252.5 mi (406.359 km)
- Scheduled distance: 100 laps, 250 mi (400 km)
- Weather: Clear
- Average speed: 132.045 mph (212.506 km/h)
- Attendance: 50,000

Pole position
Driver	Ricky Stenhouse Jr.	Roush Fenway Racing
- Time: 50.775

Most laps led
Driver	Kurt Busch	Phoenix Racing
- Laps: 23

Winner
No. 1	Kurt Busch	Kurt Busch

Television in the United States
- Network: ESPN
- Announcers: Allen Bestwick, Dale Jarrett, Andy Petree

The 2012 Subway Jalapeño 250 was a NASCAR Nationwide Series race held at Daytona International Speedway in Daytona Beach, Florida on July 6, 2012. The race was the 11th iteration of the event and the 16th race of the 2012 NASCAR Nationwide Series. Austin Dillon originally won the pole but was disallowed after failing inspection which gave the pole Ricky Stenhouse Jr. but it was Kurt Busch who would dominate in the race that saw 42 lead changes over 101 laps as he would lead the most laps and would win the race on a last lap pass.

== Background ==
Daytona International Speedway is a race track in Daytona Beach, Florida, United States. Since opening in 1959, it has been the home of the Daytona 500, the most prestigious race in NASCAR as well as its season opening event. In addition to NASCAR, the track also hosts races for ARCA, AMA Superbike, IMSA, SCCA, and Motocross. The track features multiple layouts including the primary 2.500 mi (4.023 km) high-speed tri-oval, a 3.560 mi (5.729 km) sports car course, a 2.950 mi (4.748 km) motorcycle course, and a 1,320 ft (402.3 m) karting and motorcycle flat-track. The track's 180-acre (72.8 ha) infield includes the 29-acre (11.7 ha) Lake Lloyd, which has hosted powerboat racing. The speedway is operated by NASCAR pursuant to a lease with the City of Daytona Beach on the property that runs until 2054. Dale Earnhardt is Daytona International Speedway's all-time winningest driver, with a total of 34 career victories (12- Daytona 500 Qualifying Races) (7- NASCAR Xfinity Series Races) (6- Busch Clash Races) (6- IROC Races) (2- Pepsi 400 July Races) (1- The 1998 Daytona 500).

=== Entry list ===
- (R) denotes rookie driver
- (i) denotes driver who is ineligible for series driver points

#	Driver	Team	Make
01	Mike Wallace	JD Motorsports	Chevrolet
1	Kurt Busch (i)	Phoenix Racing	Chevrolet
2	Elliott Sadler	Richard Childress Racing	Chevrolet
3	Austin Dillon (R)	Richard Childress Racing	Chevrolet
4	Danny Efland	JD Motorsprots	Chevrolet
6	Ricky Stenhouse Jr.	Roush Fenway Racing	Ford
7	Danica Patrick	JR Motorsports	Chevrolet
08	Bryan Silas (i)	Randy Hill Racing	Ford
10	Jeff Green	TriStar Motorsports	Toyota
11	Brian Scott	Joe Gibbs Racing	Toyota
12	Sam Hornish Jr.	Penske Racing	Dodge
14	Eric McClure	TriStar Motorsports	Toyota
15	Jeffrey Earnhardt	Rick Ware Racing	Ford
18	Joey Logano (i)	Joe Gibbs Racing	Toyota
19	Tayler Malsam	TriStar Motorsports	Toyota
20	Clint Bowyer (i)	Joe Gibbs Racing	Toyota
22	Brad Keselowski (i)	Penske Racing	Dodge
23	Robert Richardson Jr.	R3 Motorsports	Chevrolet
24	Casey Roderick	SR² Motorsports	Toyota
30	James Buescher (i)	Turner Motorsports	Chevrolet
31	Justin Allgaier	Turner Motorsports	Chevrolet
33	Kevin Harvick (i)	Richard Childress Racing	Chevrolet
36	Bobby Santos III	Tommy Baldwin Racing	Chevrolet
38	Brad Sweet (R)	Turner Motorsports	Chevrolet
39	Josh Richards	Go Green Racing	Ford
40	Erik Darnell	The Motorsports Group	Chevrolet
41	Timmy Hill	Rick Ware Racing	Chevrolet
42	Josh Wise (i)	The Motorsports Group	Chevrolet
43	Michael Annett	Richard Petty Motorsports	Ford
44	Mike Bliss	TriStar Motorsports	Toyota
46	Chase Miller	The Motorsports Group	Chevrolet
47	Stephen Leicht (i)	The Motorsports Group	Chevrolet
50	T. J. Bell	MAKE Motorsports	Chevrolet
51	Jeremy Clements	Jeremy Clements Racing	Chevrolet
52	Joey Gase	Hamilton Means Racing	Chevrolet
54	Kyle Busch (i)	Kyle Busch Motorsports	Toyota
70	Johanna Long (R)	ML Motorsports	Chevrolet
74	Mike Harmon	Mike Harmon Racing	Chevrolet
81	Jason Bowles (R)	MacDonald Motorsports	Toyota
82	Blake Koch	MacDonald Motorsports	Dodge
87	Joe Nemechek	NEMCO Motorsports	Toyota
88	Cole Whitt (R)	JR Motorsports	Chevrolet
99	John Wes Townley (i)	RAB Racing	Toyota
Official Entry list

== Qualifying ==
Austin Dillon originally won the pole but his time was disallowed for failing post-qualifying inspection which started Dillon in 42nd place and gave the pole position to Ricky Stenhouse Jr. whose time was 50.775 and a speed of 177.253.

Grid	No.	Driver	Team	Manufacturer	Time	Speed
1	6	Ricky Stenhouse Jr.	Roush Fenway Racing	Ford	50.775	177.253
2	88	Cole Whitt (R)	JR Motorsports	Chevrolet	50.821	177.092
3	7	Danica Patrick	JR Motorsports	Chevrolet	50.844	177.012
4	33	Kevin Harvick (i)	Richard Childress Racing	Chevrolet	50.849	176.995
5	1	Kurt Busch (i)	Phoenix Racing	Chevrolet	50.886	176.866
6	22	Brad Keselowski (i)	Penske Racing	Dodge	50.921	176.744
7	01	Mike Wallace	JD Motorsports	Chevrolet	50.974	176.561
8	18	Joey Logano (i)	Joe Gibbs Racing	Toyota	50.978	176.547
9	11	Brian Scott	Joe Gibbs Racing	Toyota	51.001	176.467
10	36	Bobby Santos III	Tommy Baldwin Racing	Chevrolet	51.019	176.405
11	70	Johanna Long (R)	ML Motorsports	Chevrolet	51.067	176.239
12	20	Clint Bowyer (i)	Joe Gibbs Racing	Toyota	51.083	176.184
13	2	Elliott Sadler	Richard Childress Racing	Chevrolet	51.125	176.039
14	30	James Buescher (i)	Turner Motorsports	Chevrolet	51.192	175.809
15	44	Mike Bliss	TriStar Motorsports	Toyota	51.197	175.792
16	12	Sam Hornish Jr.**	Penske Racing	Dodge	51.231	175.675
17	43	Michael Annett	Richard Petty Motorsports	Ford	51.277	175.517
18	99	John Wes Townley (i)	RAB Racing	Toyota	51.283	175.497
19	38	Brad Sweet (R)	Turner Motorsports	Chevrolet	51.300	175.439
20	54	Kyle Busch (i)	Kyle Busch Motorsports	Toyota	51.397	175.107
21	31	Justin Allgaier	Turner Motorsports	Chevrolet	51.440	174.961
22	19	Tayler Malsam	TriStar Motorsports	Toyota	51.515	174.706
23	10	Jeff Green	TriStar Motorsports	Toyota	51.579	174.490
24	24	Casey Roderick	SR² Motorsports	Toyota	51.635	174.300
25	87	Joe Nemechek	NEMCO Motorsports	Toyota	51.647	174.260
26	14	Eric McClure	TriStar Motorsports	Toyota	51.677	174.159
27	39	Josh Richards	Go Green Racing	Ford	51.690	174.115
28	4	Danny Efland	JD Motorsports	Chevrolet	51.747	173.923
29	81	Jason Bowles (R)	MacDonald Motorsports	Toyota	51.788	173.785
30	15	Jeffrey Earnhardt	Rick Ware Racing	Ford	51.836	173.625
31	82	Blake Koch	MacDonald Motorsports	Dodge	51.974	173.164
32	08	Bryan Silas (i)	Randy Hill Racing	Ford	51.976	173.157
33	51	Jeremy Clements	Jeremy Clements Racing	Chevrolet	52.043	172.934
34	23	Robert Richardson Jr.	R3 Motorsports	Chevrolet	52.140	172.612
35	50	T. J. Bell	MAKE Motorsports	Chevrolet	52.238	172.288
36	74	Mike Harmon	Mike Harmon Racing	Chevrolet	52.308	172.058
37	41	Timmy Hill	Rick Ware Racing	Chevrolet	52.407	171.733
38	47	Stephen Leicht (i)	The Motorsports Group	Chevrolet	52.419	171.693
39	42	Josh Wise (i)	The Motorsports Group	Chevrolet	52.473	171.517
40	52	Joey Gase	Hamilton Means Racing	Chevrolet	52.580	171.168
41	40	Erik Darnell*	The Motorsports Group	Chevrolet	52.748	170.623
42	3	Austin Dillon (R) (Note: Dillon won the pole but his time was disallowed for failing post-qualifying inspection and had to start in 42nd. He was docked 6 drivers points.)	Richard Childress Racing	Chevrolet	—	—
43	46	Chase Miller	The Motorsports Group	Chevrolet	52.603	171.093
Official Starting grid

* – Made the field via owners points.

** – Sam Hornish Jr. had to start at the rear of the field due to an engine change.

== Race ==
As soon as the race started, drivers started to form into tandems. Outside pole sitter Cole Whitt took the lead from pole sitter Ricky Stenhouse Jr. with Kevin Harvick pushing Whitt and Whitt led the first lap. On lap 4, Clint Bowyer took the lead with Elliott Sadler pushing him. Bowyer and Sadler switched positions on lap 5 and gave the lead to Brad Keselowski with Joey Logano behind him. Keselowski and Logano did the same thing on lap 6 and gave the lead to Sadler. On lap 7, Kurt Busch took the lead with his brother Kyle pushing him. On lap 8, Joey Logano took the lead. On that same lap, the first caution flew when Brian Scott's car stalled on the backstretch. Brad Keselowski won the race off of pit road but his teammate Sam Hornish Jr. did not pit and Hornish led the field to the restart on lap 12. On lap 15, Joey Logano took the lead with Elliott Sadler pushing him. On lap 16, Mike Wallace attempted to take the lead with Clint Bowyer pushing him but both Logano and Wallace left the middle open and the Busch brothers took advantage and Kurt Busch took the lead with Kyle behind him. On lap 18, Danica Patrick took the lead with Brad Keselowski behind her after the Busch brothers decided to switch positions. On lap 23, Kurt Busch took the lead with Kyle behind him. On lap 31, Mike Wallace took the lead with Kevin Harvick pushing him. On lap 32, Joe Nemechek took the lead with Ricky Stenhouse after Wallace and Harvick switched spots. On lap 34, Kyle Busch took the lead with brother Kurt behind him. On lap 37, the Busch brothers switched positions and did so successfully without losing the lead. On lap 41, the second caution would fly when Mike Wallace spun in turn 2 after Wallace was trying to pass Bryan Silas and also to avoid Sam Hornish Jr. who just came off of pit road while Silas tried to do the same but Silas clipped Wallace in the left rear and turned him. Danica Patrick won the race off of pit road and she led the field to the restart on lap 46. On the restart, Kurt Busch took the lead with Austin Dillon behind him but both were passed by Joe Nemechek with Ricky Stenhouse Jr. and Nemechek took the lead. On lap 48, Danica Patrick took the lead with Kevin Harvick but both got separated and gave the lead back to Nemechek. On lap 49, Joey Logano took the lead with Elliott Sadler.

=== Final laps ===
With 48 laps to go, Brad Keselowski took the lead. With 47 to go, Joey Logano took the lead back. With 45 to go, Danica Patrick took the lead from Logano. With 44 to go, Mike Wallace took the lead with Kevin Harvick pushing him. With 42 to go, Danica Patrick took the lead back with Cole Whitt behind her. With 38 to go, James Buescher, who won the Daytona race back in February, took the lead with Brad Keselowski pushing him. With 37 to go, Kevin Harvick took the lead with Mike Wallace behind him. With 35 to go, Justin Allgaier took the lead with Danica Patrick in turn 2 after Harvick and Wallace went to switch spots but did it in a very unsuccessful way. Harvick got caught up in the middle with no draft so Wallace tried to come down in front of James Buescher. But Wallace did it too late and Wallace made contact with Buescher cutting his right front tire and causing him to go up the track and turn Brad Keselowski in the first big wreck of the race that took out 17 cars in a chain reaction wreck. The wreck collected Mike Wallace, Kurt Busch, Elliott Sadler, Danny Efland, Clint Bowyer, Brad Keselowski, Casey Roderick, James Buescher, Kevin Harvick, Bobby Santos III, Michael Annett, Kyle Busch, Johanna Long, Jason Bowles, Joe Nemechek, Cole Whitt, and John Wes Townley. Justin Allgaier won the race off of pit road and he led the field to the restart with 28 laps to go. On the restart, Danica Patrick and Joey Logano both passed Allgaier on the outside with Patrick getting pushed by Austin Dillon and Logano by Sam Hornish Jr. Logano took the lead on the restart. With 25 to go, Austin Dillon took the lead with Justin Allgaier pushing him. With 24 to go, Dillon decided to drop out and give Allgaier the lead but Allgaier was slingshotted by Kurt Busch and Busch took the lead. Going through turn 4, rookie Brad Sweet attempted to take the lead from Busch on the same lap with Ricky Stenhouse Jr. pushing him but Stenhouse got Sweet at the wrong angle and turned Sweet off of turn 4 where Sweet hit the inside wall drivers side door first bringing out the 4th caution of the race. The race would restart with 19 laps to go. On the restart, Bobby Santos III all of a sudden went through the grass on the backstretch. No caution was flown. At the same time, Elliott Sadler took the lead with Joey Logano pushing him. With 18 to go, the 5th caution flew for a 6 car accident on the backstretch. Ricky Stenhouse Jr. was pushing Jeffrey Earnhardt when he hit Earnhardt at the wrong angle sending Earnhardt spinning across the track. Danica Patrick went low to avoid Earnhardt but came across the nose of Eric McClure sending Patrick around and hitting the inside wall while Blake Koch made contact with Jeremy Clements when Koch tried to avoid the wreck and ended up spinning himself. The race would restart with 12 laps to go. With 11 to go, Sam Hornish Jr. took the lead with Justin Allgaier but couldn't get fully in front of Sadler and Sadler retook it back before Austin Dillon tried to take it with 10 to go with Kurt Busch and led that lap but couldn't make the pass on Sadler. With 8 to go, Austin Dillon took the lead from Sadler. Dillon was looking to get his 2nd Nationwide Series win in a row after he won his first ever in his career in the previous weeks' race at Kentucky. With 5 to go, Justin Allgaier attempted to take the lead with Sam Hornish Jr. and led that lap but couldn't pass Dillon. But with just 4 laps to go, the 6th and final caution flew for debris on the frontstretch that came off of John Wes Townley's car. This would extend the race to three attempts of a green-white-checkered finish. On the restart, Dillon shot out to the lead but Kurt Busch slingshotted him to the outside and tried to have Logano as his pusher but Logano went high to make it 3 wide and Logano took the lead with Elliott Sadler behind him. On the final lap, Kurt Busch went to take the lead with Ricky Stenhouse Jr. behind him and got Logano and Sadler separated and Busch took the lead. Behind them, Austin Dillon got a big run with Michael Annett pushing him but Dillon wrecked coming through the tri-oval before he had a chance and Dillon caused a second big wreck coming to the checkered flag where 8 cars wrecked with Dillon where Dillon took a couple hard shots. First getting t-boned by Kyle Busch in the drivers side door and then going back up where he got t-boned on the other side by Robert Richardson Jr. The wreck also collected Johanna Long, Jason Bowles, Tayler Malsam, and Josh Richards. Kurt Busch held off everyone and won the race as soon as Dillon spun. The win would be Busch's first ever win at Daytona in all of NASCAR and his 2nd and final win of the 2012 season. Ricky Stenhouse Jr., Michael Annett, Austin Dillon, and Joey Logano rounded out the top 5 while Elliott Sadler, Justin Allgaier, Mike Bliss, Timmy Hill, and Sam Hornish Jr. rounded out the top 10.

== Race results ==
Pos	Car	Driver	Team	Manufacturer	Laps Run	Laps Led	Status	Points
1	1	Kurt Busch (i)	Phoenix Racing	Chevrolet	101	23	running	0
2	6	Ricky Stenhouse Jr.	Roush Fenway Racing	Ford	101	0	running	42
3	43	Michael Annett	Richard Petty Motorsports	Ford	101	0	running	41
4	3	Austin Dillon (R)	Richard Childress Racing	Chevrolet	101	8	running	35
5	18	Joey Logano (i)	Joe Gibbs Racing	Toyota	101	12	running	0
6	2	Elliott Sadler	Richard Childress Racing	Chevrolet	101	10	running	39
7	31	Justin Allgaier	Turner Motorsports	Chevrolet	101	7	running	38
8	44	Mike Bliss	TriStar Motorsports	Toyota	101	0	running	36
9	41	Timmy Hill	Rick Ware Racing	Chevrolet	101	0	running	35
10	12	Sam Hornish Jr.	Penske Racing	Dodge	101	6	running	35
11	51	Jeremy Clements	Jeremy Clements Racing	Chevrolet	101	2	running	34
12	70	Johanna Long (R)	ML Motorsprots	Chevrolet	101	0	running	32
13	4	Danny Efland	JD Motorsports	Chevrolet	101	0	running	31
14	81	Jason Bowles (R)	MacDonald Motorsports	Toyota	101	0	running	30
15	19	Tayler Malsam	TriStar Motorsports	Toyota	101	0	running	29
16	39	Josh Richards	Go Green Racing	Ford	101	0	running	28
17	23	Robert Richardson Jr.	R3 Motorsports	Chevrolet	101	0	running	27
18	14	Eric McClure	TriStar Motorsports	Toyota	101	0	running	26
19	82	Blake Koch	MacDonald Motorsports	Dodge	101	0	running	25
20	08	Bryan Silas (i)	Randy Hill Racing	Ford	100	0	running	0
21	40	Erik Darnell	The Motorsports Group	Chevrolet	99	0	running	23
22	87	Joe Nemechek	NEMCO Motorsports	Toyota	97	5	running	23
23	54	Kyle Busch (i)	Kyle Busch Motorsports	Toyota	94	3	running	0
24	38	Brad Sweet (R)	Turner Motorsports	Chevrolet	93	0	running	20
25	99	John Wes Townley (i)	RAB Racing	Toyota	89	0	running	0
26	20	Clint Bowyer (i)	Joe Gibbs Racing	Toyota	86	1	running	0
27	24	Casey Roderick	SR² Motorsports	Toyota	84	0	running	17
28	33	Kevin Harvick (i)	Richard Childress Racing	Chevrolet	84	2	crash	0
29	88	Cole Whitt (R)	JR Motorsports	Chevrolet	83	3	running	16
30	15	Jeffrey Earnhardt	Rick Ware Racing	Ford	82	0	crash	14
31	7	Danica Patrick	JR Motorsports	Chevrolet	82	13	crash	14
32	11	Brian Scott	Joe Gibbs Racing	Toyota	82	0	running	12
33	36	Bobby Santos III	Tommy Baldwin Racing	Chevrolet	80	0	crash	11
34	30	James Buescher (i)	Turner Motorsports	Chevrolet	71	1	crash	0
35	22	Brad Keselowski (i)	Penske Racing	Dodge	66	2	crash	0
36	01	Mike Wallace	JD Motorsports	Chevrolet	65	3	crash	9
37	52	Joey Gase	Hamilton Means Racing	Chevrolet	50	0	overheating	7
38	74	Mike Harmon	Mike Harmon Racing	Chevrolet	31	0	overheating	6
39	50	T. J. Bell	MAKE Motorsports	Chevrolet	22	0	engine	5
40	46	Chase Miller	The Motorsports Group	Chevrolet	6	0	vibration	4
41	42	Josh Wise (i)	The Motorsports Group	Chevrolet	4	0	transmission	0
42	47	Stephen Leicht (i)	The Motorsports Group	Chevrolet	3	0	overheating	0
43	10	Jeff Green	TriStar Motorsports	Toyota	3	0	overheating	1
Official Race results

== Notes ==
Previous race: 2012 Feed the Children 300	NASCAR Nationwide Series; 2012 season	Next race: 2012 F. W. Webb 300
