= 2014 Subway Firecracker 250 =

Race details
- Map of Speedway
- Date: July 4, 2014
- Official name: 2014 Subway Firecracker 250
- Location: Daytona International Speedway in Daytona Beach, Florida
- Course: Tri-oval
- Course length: 2.5 miles (4.023 km)
- Distance: 103 laps, 257.5 mi (414.406 km)
- Scheduled distance: 100 laps, 250 mi (400 km)
- Weather: Clear
- Average speed: 157.012 mph (252.686 km/h)

Pole position
Driver	Dakoda Armstrong	Richard Petty Motorsports
- Time: 46.845

Most laps led
Driver	Regan Smith	JR Motorsports
- Laps: 47

Winner
No. 5	Kasey Kahne	JR Motorsports

Television in the United States
- Network: ESPN2
- Announcers: Allen Bestwick, Dale Jarrett, Andy Petree

The 2014 Subway Firecracker 250 was a NASCAR Nationwide Series race held at on July 4, 2014 Daytona International Speedway in Daytona Beach, Florida. The race was the 16th of the 2014 NASCAR Nationwide Series and the 13th iteration of the event. It would also be the last Daytona race for the title sponsor Nationwide and the last Daytona race to be broadcast on ESPN. The pole was a surprise as rookie Dakoda Armstrong won the pole while Regan Smith led the most laps at 47 but it was Kasey Kahne who made a last lap pass to win the race and beat Smith by .020 seconds in a very close finish.

== Background ==
Daytona International Speedway is a race track in Daytona Beach, Florida, United States. Since opening in 1959, it has been the home of the Daytona 500, the most prestigious race in NASCAR as well as its season opening event. In addition to NASCAR, the track also hosts races for ARCA, AMA Superbike, IMSA, SCCA, and Motocross. The track features multiple layouts including the primary 2.500 mi (4.023 km) high-speed tri-oval, a 3.560 mi (5.729 km) sports car course, a 2.950 mi (4.748 km) motorcycle course, and a 1,320 ft (402.3 m) karting and motorcycle flat-track. The track's 180-acre (72.8 ha) infield includes the 29-acre (11.7 ha) Lake Lloyd, which has hosted powerboat racing. The speedway is operated by NASCAR pursuant to a lease with the City of Daytona Beach on the property that runs until 2054. Dale Earnhardt is Daytona International Speedway's all-time winningest driver, with a total of 34 career victories (12- Daytona 500 Qualifying Races) (7- NASCAR Xfinity Series Races) (6- Busch Clash Races) (6- IROC Races) (2- Pepsi 400 July Races) (1- The 1998 Daytona 500).

=== Entry list ===
- (R) denotes rookie driver
- (i) denotes driver who is ineligible for series driver points

#	Driver	Team	Make
01	Landon Cassill	JD Motorsports	Chevrolet
2	Brian Scott	Richard Childress Racing	Chevrolet
3	Ty Dillon (R)	Richard Childress Racing	Chevrolet
4	Jeffrey Earnhardt	JD Motorsports	Chevrolet
5	Kasey Kahne (i)	JR Motorsports	Chevrolet
6	Trevor Bayne	Roush Fenway Racing	Ford
7	Regan Smith	JR Motorsports	Chevrolet
9	Chase Elliott (R)	JR Motorsports	Chevrolet
10	Blake Koch	TriStar Motorsports	Toyota
11	Elliott Sadler	Joe Gibbs Racing	Toyota
14	Eric McClure	TriStar Motorsports	Toyota
16	Ryan Reed (R)	Roush Fenway Racing	Ford
17	Tanner Berryhill (R)	Vision Racing	Dodge
19	Mike Bliss	TriStar Motorsports	Toyota
20	Bubba Wallace (i)	Joe Gibbs Racing	Toyota
22	Joey Logano (i)	Team Penske	Ford
23	Robert Richardson Jr.	R3 Motorsports	Chevrolet
25	John Wes Townley (i)	Athenian Motorsports	Toyota
28	J. J. Yeley	JGL Racing	Dodge
29	Scott Lagasse Jr.	RAB Racing	Toyota
31	Dylan Kwasniewski (R)	Turner Scott Motorsports	Chevrolet
39	Ryan Sieg (R)	RSS Racing	Chevrolet
40	Josh Wise (i)	The Motorsports Group	Chevrolet
42	Kyle Larson (i)	Turner Scott Motorsports	Chevrolet
43	Dakoda Armstrong (R)	Richard Petty Motorsports	Ford
44	David Starr	TriStar Motorsports	Toyota
46	Matt DiBenedetto	The Motorsports Group	Chevrolet
51	Jeremy Clements	Jeremy Clements Racing	Chevrolet
52	Joey Gase	Jimmy Means Racing	Chevrolet
54	Kyle Busch (i)	Joe Gibbs Racing	Toyota
55	Ross Chastain (i)	Viva Motorsports	Chevrolet
60	Chris Buescher (R)	Roush Fenway Racing	Ford
62	Brendan Gaughan	Richard Childress Racing	Chevrolet
70	Derrike Cope	Derrike Cope Racing	Chevrolet
74	Mike Harmon	Mike Harmon Racing	Dodge
76	Tommy Joe Martins (R)	Martins Motorsports	Dodge
80	Johnny Sauter (i)	Hattori Racing Enterprises	Toyota
84	Chad Boat (R)	Billy Boat Motorsports	Chevrolet
85	Bobby Gerhart	Gerhart Racing	Chevrolet
87	Carlos Contreras	Rick Ware Racing	Chevrolet
91	Benny Gordon	TriStar Motorsports	Toyota
93	Mike Wallace	JGL Racing	Dodge
97	Joe Nemechek (i)	NEMCO Motorsports	Toyota
98	David Ragan (i)	Biagi-DenBeste Racing	Ford
99	James Buescher	RAB Racing	Toyota
Official Entry List

== Qualifying ==
A surprise won the pole for the race. Rookie Dakoda Armstrong won the pole with a time of 46.845 and a speed of 192.123 mph.

Grid	No.	Driver	Team	Manufacturer	Time	Speed
1	43	Dakoda Armstrong (R)	Richard Petty Motorsports	Ford	46.845	192.123
2	6	Trevor Bayne	Roush Fenway Racing	Ford	46.886	191.955
3	60	Chris Buescher (R)	Roush Fenway Racing	Ford	46.915	191.836
4	16	Ryan Reed (R)	Roush Fenway Racing	Ford	46.979	191.575
5	54	Kyle Busch (i)	Joe Gibbs Racing	Toyota	47.053	191.274
6	11	Elliott Sadler	Joe Gibbs Racing	Toyota	47.079	191.168
7	9	Chase Elliott (R)	JR Motorsports	Chevrolet	47.103	191.071
8	7	Regan Smith	JR Motorsports	Chevrolet	47.115	191.022
9	20	Bubba Wallace (i)	Joe Gibbs Racing	Chevrolet	47.117	191.014
10	42	Kyle Larson (i)	Turner Scott Motorsports	Chevrolet	47.212	190.630
11	22	Joey Logano (i)	Team Penske	Ford	47.261	190.432
12	84	Chad Boat (R)	Billy Boat Motorsports	Chevrolet	47.369	189.998
13	5	Kasey Kahne (i)	JR Motorsports	Chevrolet	47.422	189.785
14	62	Brendan Gaughan	Richard Childress Racing	Chevrolet	47.827	188.178
15	2	Brian Scott	Richard Childress Racing	Chevrolet	47.831	188.162
16	3	Ty Dillon (R)	Richard Childress Racing	Chevrolet	47.834	188.151
17	93	Mike Wallace	JGL Racing	Dodge	48.146	186.931
18	99	James Buescher	RAB Racing	Toyota	48.165	186.858
19	28	J. J. Yeley	JGL Racing	Dodge	48.171	186.834
20	80	Johnny Sauter (i)	Hattori Racing Enterprises	Toyota	48.193	186.749
21	39	Ryan Sieg (R)***	RSS Racing	Chevrolet	48.203	186.710
22	74	Mike Harmon	Mike Harmon Racing	Dodge	48.219	186.648
23	70	Derrike Cope	Derrike Cope Racing	Chevrolet	48.342	186.174
24	17	Tanner Berryhill (R)	Vision Racing	Dodge	48.436	185.812
25	01	Landon Cassill	JD Motorsports	Chevrolet	48.540	185.414
26	31	Dylan Kwasniewski (R)	Turner Scott Motorsports	Chevrolet	48.540	185.414
27	25	John Wes Townley (i)	Athenian Motorsports	Toyota	48.586	185.239
28	29	Scott Lagasse Jr.***	RAB Racing	Toyota	48.605	185.166
29	19	Mike Bliss***	TriStar Motorsports	Toyota	48.611	185.143
30	44	David Starr	TriStar Motorsports	Toyota	48.611	185.143
31	98	David Ragan (i)	Biagi-DenBeste Racing	Ford	48.615	185.128
32	14	Eric McClure***	TriStar Motorsports	Toyota	48.626	185.086
33	55	Ross Chastain (i)***	Viva Motorsports	Chevrolet	48.626	185.086
34	87	Carlos Contreras	Rick Ware Racing	Ford	48.874	184.147
35	40	Josh Wise (i)	The Motorsports Group	Chevrolet	48.914	183.996
36	51	Jeremy Clements*	Jeremy Clements Racing	Chevrolet	49.110	183.262
37	23	Robert Richardson Jr.* ***	R3 Motorsports	Chevrolet	49.314	182.504
38	52	Joey Gase* ***	Jimmy Means Racing	Chevrolet	51.727	173.990
39	4	Jeffrey Earnhardt*	JD Motorsports	Chevrolet	52.434	171.644
40	97	Joe Nemechek (i)** ***	NEMCO Motorsports	Toyota	48.687	184.854
Failed to Qualify, withdrew, or driver changes
41	91	Benny Gordon	TriStar Motorsports	Toyota	48.623	185.098
42	10	Blake Koch	TriStar Motorsports	Toyota	48.631	185.067
43	76	Tommy Joe Martins (R)	Martins Motorsports	Dodge	49.009	183.640
44	46	Matt DiBenedetto	The Motorsports Group	Chevrolet	49.172	183.031
45	85	Bobby Gerhart	Gerhart Racing	Chevrolet	49.242	182.771
Official Starting Lineup

* – Qualified via owners points

** – Qualified via Past Champion

*** – Eric McClure, Mike Bliss, Robert Richardson Jr., Scott Lagasse Jr., Ryan Sieg, Joey Gase, Ross Chastain, and Joe Nemechek all had to start at the rear of the field. Bliss, Richardson Jr., Lagasse Jr., and Chastain had backup cars and McClure, Sieg, Gase, and Nemechek had unapproved adjustments.

== Race ==
Outside pole sitter Trevor Bayne took the lead from pole sitter Dakoda Armstrong and led the first lap. On lap 8, Elliott Sadler took the lead from Bayne as the Joe Gibbs cars in Sadler, Kyle Busch, and Bubba Wallace were running in first, second, and third. Green flag pitstops began on lap 36 and Dakoda Armstrong was the new leader as Sadler went to pit. Armstrong came to pit the next lap and gave the lead to Brendan Gaughan. Gaughan soon pitted on lap 40 and gave the lead to Brian Scott. After everything cycled through, Kyle Busch was the new race leader. On lap 47, Kyle Larson took the lead.

=== Final laps ===
With 49 laps to go, Regan Smith took the lead. At the same time. The first caution flew for debris. Regan Smith won the race off of pit road to keep his lead. The race restarted with 43 laps to go. With 31 to go, Kyle Busch tried to take the lead and led that lap but could not pass Smith. Busch tried again multiple times with a push from Trevor Bayne but could not pass Smith and they fell back in the pack with 23 to go. Smith also had his teammate behind him in second in the young rookie sensation Chase Elliott and it looked like either Smith or Elliott might be able to win depending on the final laps. But with 8 laps to go, the second caution flew when Brendan Gaughan got turned out of turn 4 by Bubba Wallace and overcorrected up and collected rookie Dylan Kwasniewski giving Kwasniewski some damage. The race turned into a fuel strategy race as cars began saving fuel during the caution period. The race restarted with 3 laps to go. But on the restart, Chase Elliott's car ran out of gas as soon the green flag dropped which caused a stack up on the inside lane and a four car crash that brought out the third and final caution of the race involving Elliott Sadler and David Ragan spinning and giving Trevor Bayne and J. J. Yeley damage. The caution would set up a green-white-checkered finish. On the restart, Smith and Kyle Larson were side by side for the lead with Smith getting pushed by Joey Logano and Larson getting pushed by Ryan Reed. In turns 3 and four, the third car on the outside line in David Starr pushed up the race track and hit the wall in a very close call as it almost wrecked the field. No caution was thrown. Regan Smith led coming to the white flag. On the final lap, Smith got out in front of Larson with a push by Logano, Kasey Kahne, and Ryan Sieg. Down the backstretch, Logano peaked to the outside of Smith but Smith blocked Logano and Logano fell back giving Kahne a side by side battle for second with Larson. Coming out of turn 4, Smith got so far ahead it gave the pack a chance to catchup which they would. Larson peaked to the outside of Smith with Kahne right beside him but could not get up there. Kahne got a big run on the outside with a push from Ryan Sieg and Kahne would beat Smith by .020 seconds to take home his first and only win of the season. It would be the only lap Kahne would lead all race. This was the second time in a row Smith was involved in a drag race to the checkered flag at Daytona after Smith beat Brad Keselowski by .013 seconds in the previous Daytona race but this time Smith finished second. Ryan Sieg, Ryan Reed, and Kyle Larson rounded out the top 5 while Joey Logano, Bubba Wallace, Jeremy Clements, Trevor Bayne, and Mike Wallace rounded out the top 10. This would be Ryan Sieg and Ryan Reed's first career top 5 finish in their Nationwide Series careers as Sieg and Reed finished 3rd and 4th.

== Race results ==
Pos	Car	Driver	Team	Manufacturer	Laps Run	Laps Led	Status	Points
1	5	Kasey Kahne (i)	JR Motorsports	Chevrolet	103	1	running	0
2	7	Regan Smith	JR Motorsports	Chevrolet	103	47	running	44
3	39	Ryan Sieg (R)	RSS Racing	Chevrolet	103	0	running	41
4	16	Ryan Reed (R)	Roush Fenway Racing	Ford	103	0	running	40
5	42	Kyle Larson (i)	Turner Scott Motorsports	Chevrolet	103	5	running	0
6	22	Joey Logano (i)	Team Penske	Ford	103	0	running	0
7	20	Bubba Wallace (i)	Joe Gibbs Racing	Toyota	103	0	running	0
8	51	Jeremy Clements	Jeremy Clements Racing	Chevrolet	103	0	running	36
9	6	Trevor Bayne	Roush Fenway Racing	Ford	103	7	running	36
10	93	Mike Wallace	JGL Racing	Dodge	103	0	running	34
11	3	Ty Dillon (R)	Richard Childress Racing	Chevrolet	103	0	running	33
12	60	Chris Buescher (R)	Roush Fenway Racing	Ford	103	0	running	32
13	70	Derrike Cope	Derrike Cope Racing	Chevrolet	103	0	running	31
14	99	James Buescher	RAB Racing	Toyota	103	0	running	30
15	80	Johnny Sauter (i)	Hattori Racing Enterprises	Toyota	103	0	running	0
16	2	Brian Scott	Richard Childress Racing	Chevrolet	103	1	running	29
17	54	Kyle Busch (i)	Joe Gibbs Racing	Toyota	103	7	running	0
18	25	John Wes Townley (i)	Athenian Motorsports	Toyota	103	0	running	0
19	43	Dakoda Armstrong (R)	Richard Petty Motorsports	Ford	103	1	running	26
20	9	Chase Elliott (R)	JR Motorsports	Chevrolet	103	1	running	25
21	11	Elliott Sadler	Joe Gibbs Racing	Toyota	103	28	running	24
22	14	Eric McClure	TriStar Motorsports	Toyota	103	0	running	22
23	98	David Ragan (i)	Biagi-DenBeste Racing	Ford	103	0	running	0
24	31	Dylan Kwasniewski (R)	Turner Scott Motorsports	Chevrolet	103	0	running	20
25	44	David Starr	TriStar Motorsports	Toyota	103	0	running	19
26	84	Chad Boat (R)	Billy Boat Motorsports	Chevrolet	103	2	running	19
27	97	Joe Nemechek (i)	NEMCO Motorsports	Toyota	102	0	running	0
28	62	Brendan Gaughan	Richard Childress Racing	Chevrolet	102	3	running	17
29	55	Ross Chastain (i)	Viva Motorsprots	Chevrolet	101	0	running	0
30	01	Landon Cassill	JD Motorsports	Chevrolet	101	0	running	14
31	29	Scott Lagasse Jr.	RAB Racing	Toyota	101	0	running	13
32	40	Josh Wise (i)	The Motorsports Group	Chevrolet	100	0	running	0
33	4	Jeffrey Earnhardt	JD Motorsports	Chevrolet	100	0	running	11
34	87	Carlos Contreras	Rick Ware Racing	Ford	99	0	running	10
35	28	J. J. Yeley	JGL Racing	Dodge	98	0	crash	9
36	17	Tanner Berryhill (R)	Vision Racing	Dodge	97	0	running	8
37	52	Joey Gase	Jimmy Means Racing	Chevrolet	92	0	running	7
38	19	Mike Bliss	TriStar Motorsports	Toyota	62	0	rear end	6
39	74	Mike Harmon	Mike Harmon Racing	Dodge	58	0	overheating	5
40	23	Robert Richardson Jr.	R3 Motorsports	Chevrolet	13	0	rear end	4
Official Race results

Previous race: 2014 John R. Elliott HERO Campaign 300	NASCAR Nationwide Series; 2014 season	Next race: 2014 Sta-Green 200
