= NASCAR O'Reilly Auto Parts Series at Daytona International Speedway =

Annual motor race in Florida, US

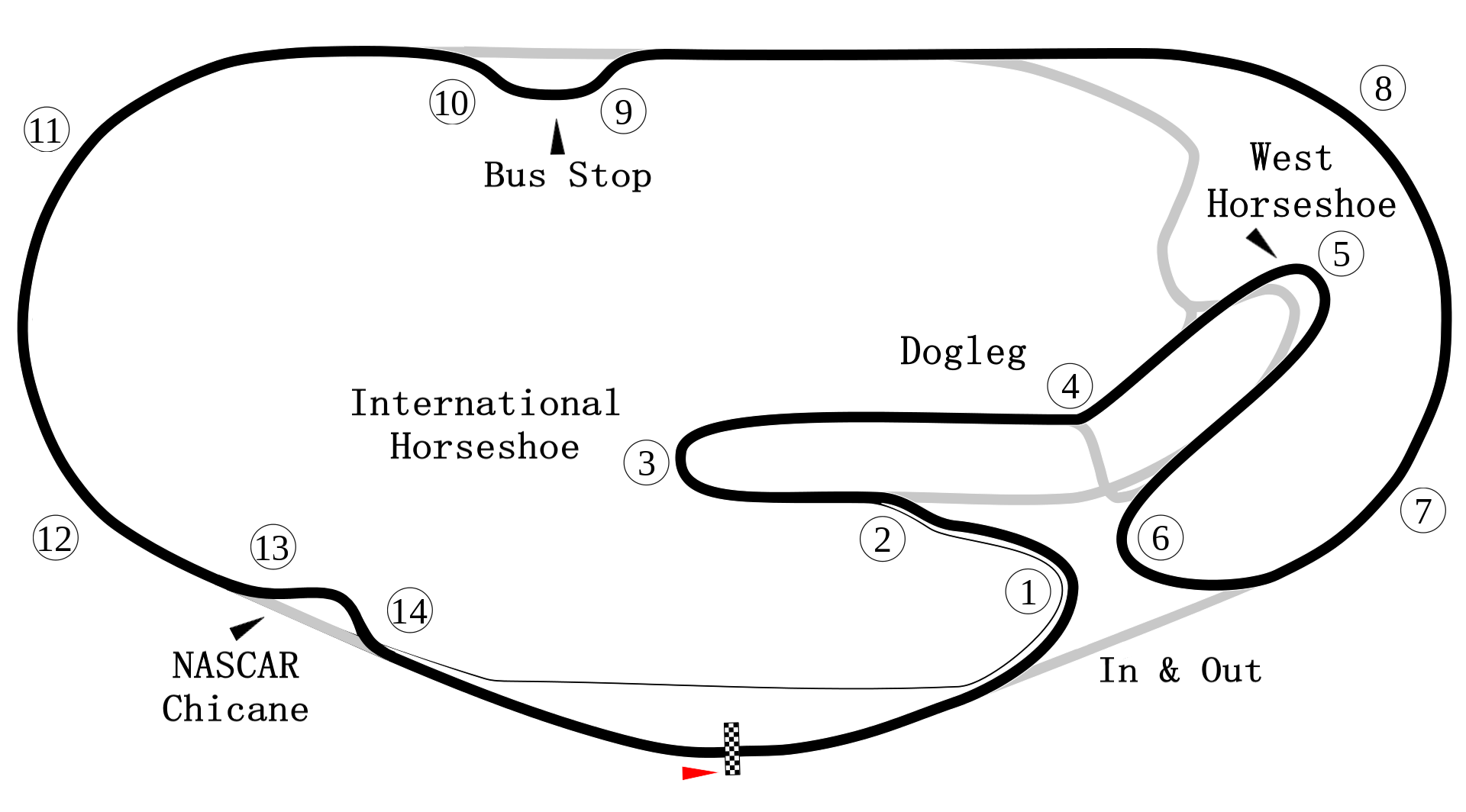

NASCAR O'Reilly Auto Parts Series
- Venue: Daytona International Speedway
- Location: Daytona Beach, Florida, United States
- Distance: Length; Oval: 2.5 miles (4.0 km); Road Course: 3.61 miles (5.81 km); Turns; Oval: 4 Road Course: 14

Circuit information
- Surface: Asphalt

Stock car racing events in the NASCAR O'Reilly Auto Parts Series have been held at Daytona International Speedway, in Daytona Beach, Florida, United States, during numerous seasons and times of year since 1959.

Until 2002, it was the only event of the O'Reilly Series to be annually held at Daytona International Speedway. In 2020, a Xfinity Series race was held on a modified road course layout.

== Spring race ==
United Rentals 300
- Corporate sponsor: United Rentals
- First race: 1982
- Distance: 300 miles (480 km)
- Laps: 120; Stages 1/2: 30 each Final stage: 60
- Previous names: Modified Sportsman Race (1959–1965); Permatex 300 (1966–1977); Sportsman 300 (1978–1981); Goody's 300 (1982–1995); Goody's Headache Powder 300 (1996); Gargoyles 300 (1997); NAPA Auto Parts 300 (1998–2001); EAS/GNC Live Well 300 (2002); Koolerz 300 (2003); Hershey's Kisses 300 (2004); Hershey's Take 5 300 (2005); Hershey's Kissables 300 (2006); Orbitz 300 (2007); Camping World 300 (2008–2009); DRIVE4COPD 300 (2010–2014); Alert Today Florida 300 (2015); PowerShares QQQ 300 (2016–2018); NASCAR Racing Experience 300 (2019–2020); Beef. It's What's for Dinner. 300 (2021–2023)
- Most wins (driver): Dale Earnhardt and Tony Stewart (7)
- Most wins (team): Dale Earnhardt, Inc. and Richard Childress Racing (8)
- Most wins (manufacturer): Chevrolet (38)

The United Rentals 300 is the first race of the NASCAR O'Reilly Auto Parts Series season, 300-mile-long (483 km) held at Daytona International Speedway. It is held the day before the Daytona 500, and is considered the most prestigious event of the O'Reilly Series.

Austin Hill is the defending winner of the event.

=== History ===
In 1959, the new 2.5-mile Daytona International Speedway hosted its first O'Reilly Series event. It was scheduled the day before the Daytona 500, and ran a distance of either 200 or 250 miles. In 1968, the race was shifted from the Modifieds division to the newly organized NASCAR Late Model Sportsman Division.

In 1982, the Late Model Sportsman Division was reorganized into the modern day NASCAR O'Reilly Auto Parts Series.

The 2018 race produced the closest finish in any of NASCAR's top three series, when Tyler Reddick edged Elliott Sadler by 0.0004 seconds, making it the closest finish in NASCAR history. Since NASCAR scoring and timing does not measure beyond thousands of a second, the margin of victory was officially listed as 0.000 seconds (with video review which declared Reddick the winner by less than three inches). Analysis after the race by NASCAR timing and scoring officials placed Reddick's margin of victory at 0.0004 seconds. This race also had a record five overtime finishes, extending the race length to 143 laps.

==== Sponsors ====
In 1966, the race became known as the Permatex 300, making it only the second race on the NASCAR schedule to be named for a corporate sponsor. From 1982 to 1996, the race was sponsored by Goody's for several years. Other sponsorships for the race included NAPA Auto Parts, GNC, Hershey's, Camping World, the NASCAR Driving Experience, the National Livestock and Meat Board (alternatively known as "Beef 300" in NASCAR media), and United Rentals.

==== Incidents ====
In the 1970s and early 1980s, the race was often ridiculed and exploited by local media for its frequent crashes and massive pileups. Several major accidents and fires over the years were blamed on the low level of experience by several of the drivers, and the older equipment used. The level of prestige held by the event, along with the relatively large purses, attracted numerous independent and one-off entries, contributing to the inexperience of drivers in the field.

By the time the race had become part of a NASCAR touring series race, NASCAR tightened driver eligibility requirements, and the number of incidents has drastically been reduced. Under current NASCAR rules, drivers must be cleared to race at Daytona, Talladega (added to the second tier series in 1992), and Atlanta (after the 2022 redesign) requiring enough experience at intermediate tracks to be cleared by NASCAR to participate at Daytona. Drivers who intend to run the 300 or the Truck Series Fresh From Florida 250 are required to participate in other lower-tier shorter support races, whether it was the former Dash Series race (which ended after 2004—it used less powerful cars) or until 2020, the ARCA race the week prior to gain NASCAR clearance, especially if a driver has turned 18 after the preceding October Talladega Craftsman Truck Series race (the ARCA race was moved to the Xfinity race day in 2021). NASCAR will also mandate the driver to participate in the January ARCA test at Daytona prior to the ARCA race or any national series race they intend to enter at Daytona, Talladega, or Atlanta during a season before they are allowed to participate in an ARCA or national series race at those circuits and there are no intermediate tracks beforehand.

The 1960 race is notable for having the largest pileup in NASCAR history. On the first lap, 37 cars crashed in turn four (out of a starting field of 68).

In 1981 and 2004, the race started on Saturday, but was halted by rain, and finished Monday, the day after the Daytona 500. The 1969 race was red flagged three times for rain and also saw the fatal crash involving Don MacTavish, which his whole front of the car ripped off.

The 1979 running was shortened by rain and won by Darrell Waltrip. A brutal crash erupted off Turn Two where fire exploded from the Marion Cox Mercury of Joe Frasson; driver Don Williams was gravely injured in the crash and would die ten years later from the incident.

The 2013 race featured two large accidents. With five laps remaining, Michael Annett and Austin Dillon collided and a multi-car crash erupted in the first turn. The race was halted as a red flag was given to clean up the debris. Annett was hospitalized overnight after sustaining bruises on his chest, but was released the following day in time for the Daytona 500, but was ruled out for the following race at Phoenix because of a sternum injury. Following the red flag the race had two laps remaining. Regan Smith and Brad Keselowski moved into the lead on the final lap, but off the fourth turn, Keselowski turned Smith into the wall head on, causing the field to pile in. Kyle Larson had the most significant impact, as his No.32 Chevrolet flew into the tri-oval catch fence, causing its nose to snag a crossover gate, which tore open. The force of the collision dug the engine in, ripping it out of the car. The car's entire front half disintegrated and one front wheel lodged onto the engine and another flew approximately ten rows into the grandstand, injuring 30 spectators (two in critical condition). A total of twelve cars were involved in the crash, but all were unharmed. The two spectators that were seriously injured by the debris from Larson's crash were treated at the nearby Halifax Medical Center and were later released.

In 2015, two cautions in the final forty laps were caused by separate collisions that included eleven cars. In the first collision, Regan Smith's car flipped over once in the tri-oval, while in the second collision, Kyle Busch collided into a concrete wall head on, suffering a fracture in his leg and foot. Ryan Reed would win the race, the first race under the Xfinity banner. As a result of his injuries, Busch was forced to miss the first 11 races of the Sprint Cup Series season however he would still manage to win the season championship.

On the final lap of the 2022 Beef. It's What's for Dinner. 300, Myatt Snider flipped into the catchfence coming into turn 3. The driver walked away from the crash. This gave former NASCAR Camping World Truck Series driver Austin Hill his first career NASCAR Xfinity Series win.

=== Past winners ===
Year	Date	No.	Driver	Team	Manufacturer	Race Distance		Race Time	Average Speed (mph)	Report	Ref
Year	Date	No.	Driver	Team	Manufacturer	Laps	Miles (km)	Race Time	Average Speed (mph)	Report	Ref
1959	February 21	49	Banjo Matthews	N/A	Ford	80	200 (321.868)	1:29:07	134.65	Report	
1960	February 13	81	Bubba Farr	Roy Cook	Ford	100	250 (402.336)	2:08:38	116.610	Report	
1961	February 25	50	Jimmy Thompson	Marion Cox	Ford	100	250 (402.336)	1:45:50	141.732	Report	
1962	February 17	9	Lee Roy Yarbrough	N/A	Ford	100	250 (402.336)	1:42:14	146.723	Report	
1963	February 23	70	Lee Roy Yarbrough	N/A	Studebaker	100	250 (402.336)	1:42:02	147.01	Report	
1964	February 22	55	Tiny Lund	N/A	Ford	80*	200 (321.868)	1:54:49	104.506	Report	
1965	February 13	50	Marvin Panch	Marion Cox	Ford	100	250 (402.336)	1:55:48	129.533	Report	
1966	February 27	87	Curtis Turner	Andy Hotton	Ford	120	300 (482.803)	2:04:33	144.52	Report	
1967	February 25	04	Jim Paschal	N/A	Plymouth	120	300 (482.803)	2:01:28	148.188	Report	
1968	February 24	3	Bunkie Blackburn	Ray Fox	Dodge	120	300 (482.803)	2:08:11	140.423	Report	
1969*	February 22	29	Lee Roy Yarbrough	Bondy Long	Ford	120	300 (482.803)	2:49:13	105.365	Report	
1970	February 21	29	Tiny Lund	Bondy Long	Ford	120	300 (482.803)	2:15:01	133.316	Report	
1971	February 13	97	Red Farmer	N/A	Ford	120	300 (482.803)	2:27:43	140.936	Report	
1972	February 19	90	Bill Dennis	Junie Donlavey	Mercury	120	300 (482.803)	2:12:43	135.627	Report	
1973	February 17	90	Bill Dennis	Junie Donlavey	Mercury	120	300 (482.803)	2:14:10	134.161	Report	
1974	February 16	90	Bill Dennis	Junie Donlavey	Mercury	108*	270 (434.522)	1:55:20	140.462	Report	
1975	February 15	11	Jack Ingram	N/A	Chevrolet	120	300 (482.803)	2:10:20	138.107	Report	
1976	February 14	04	Joe Millikan	Petty Enterprises	Dodge	120	300 (482.803)	2:03:26	145.828	Report	
1977	February 19	21	Donnie Allison	N/A	Chevrolet	120	300 (482.803)	1:56:36	154.396	Report	
1978	February 18	88	Darrell Waltrip	DiGard Racing	Chevrolet	120	300 (482.803)	1:50:39	162.675	Report	
1979	February 17	88	Darrell Waltrip	DiGard Racing	Chevrolet	69*	172 (276.807)	1:50:22	93.778	Report	
1980	February 16	94	Jack Ingram	Junie Donlavey	Ford	120	300 (482.803)	2:19:44	128.817	Report	
1981	February 14/16*	21	David Pearson	Joel Halpern	Pontiac	120	300 (482.803)	2:19:05	129.419	Report	
1982	February 13	15	Dale Earnhardt	Robert Gee	Pontiac	120	300 (482.803)	1:56:29	154.529	Report	
1983	February 19	17	Darrell Waltrip	DarWal, Inc.	Pontiac	120	300 (482.803)	2:01:55	147.642	Report	
1984	February 18	17	Darrell Waltrip	DarWal, Inc.	Pontiac	120	300 (482.803)	1:54:56	156.613	Report	
1985	February 16	5	Geoff Bodine	Hendrick Motorsports	Pontiac	120	300 (482.803)	1:54:33	157.137	Report	
1986	February 15	8	Dale Earnhardt	Dale Earnhardt, Inc.	Pontiac	120	300 (482.803)	2:00:52	148.924	Report	
1987	February 14	15	Geoff Bodine	Hendrick Motorsports	Chevrolet	120	300 (482.803)	1:56:03	155.106	Report	
1988	February 13	12	Bobby Allison	Bobby Allison	Buick	120	300 (482.803)	2:15:09	132.825	Report	
1989	February 18	17	Darrell Waltrip	DarWal, Inc.	Chevrolet	120	300 (482.803)	2:17:11	131.211	Report	
1990	February 17	3	Dale Earnhardt	Dale Earnhardt, Inc.	Chevrolet	120	300 (482.803)	2:00:31	149.357	Report	
1991	February 16	3	Dale Earnhardt	Dale Earnhardt, Inc.	Chevrolet	120	300 (482.803)	2:04:50	144.192	Report	
1992	February 15	3	Dale Earnhardt	Dale Earnhardt, Inc.	Chevrolet	120	300 (482.803)	2:15:55	132.434	Report	
1993	February 13	3	Dale Earnhardt	Dale Earnhardt, Inc.	Chevrolet	120	300 (482.803)	2:02:55	146.440	Report	
1994	February 19	3	Dale Earnhardt	Dale Earnhardt, Inc.	Chevrolet	120	300 (482.803)	2:04:53	144.135	Report	
1995	February 18	23	Chad Little	ppc Racing	Ford	120	300 (482.803)	1:59:25	150.732	Report	
1996	February 17	29	Steve Grissom	Diamond Ridge Motorsports	Chevrolet	120	300 (482.803)	2:07:52	140.722	Report	
1997	February 15	74	Randy LaJoie	BACE Motorsports	Chevrolet	120	300 (482.803)	2:00:15	149.688	Report	
1998	February 14	87	Joe Nemechek	NEMCO Motorsports	Chevrolet	120	300 (482.803)	2:11:11	137.213	Report	
1999	February 13	1	Randy LaJoie	Phoenix Racing	Chevrolet	120	300 (482.803)	2:10:04	138.391	Report	
2000	February 19	17	Matt Kenseth	Reiser Enterprises	Chevrolet	120	300 (482.803)	2:07:54	140.735	Report	
2001	February 17	7	Randy LaJoie	Evans Motorsports	Pontiac	120	300 (482.803)	2:13:11	135.152	Report	
2002	February 16	3	Dale Earnhardt Jr.	Richard Childress Racing	Chevrolet	120	300 (482.803)	2:01:54	147.662	Report	
2003	February 15	8	Dale Earnhardt Jr.	Chance 2 Motorsports	Chevrolet	120	300 (482.803)	2:05:12	143.770	Report	
2004	February 14/16*	8	Dale Earnhardt Jr.	Dale Earnhardt, Inc.	Chevrolet	120	300 (482.803)	2:21:32	127.179	Report	
2005	February 19	33	Tony Stewart	Kevin Harvick Inc.	Chevrolet	120	300 (482.803)	1:59:59	150.021	Report	
2006	February 18	33	Tony Stewart	Kevin Harvick Inc.	Chevrolet	120	300 (482.803)	2:23:49	125.159	Report	
2007	February 17	21	Kevin Harvick	Richard Childress Racing	Chevrolet	120	300 (482.803)	1:55:13	156.227	Report	
2008	February 16	20	Tony Stewart	Joe Gibbs Racing	Toyota	120	300 (482.803)	1:56:46	154.154	Report	
2009	February 14	80	Tony Stewart	Hendrick Motorsports	Chevrolet	120	300 (482.803)	2:09:59	138.479	Report	
2010	February 13	4	Tony Stewart	Kevin Harvick Inc.	Chevrolet	120	300 (482.803)	2:25:32	123.683	Report	
2011	February 19	4	Tony Stewart*	Kevin Harvick Inc.	Chevrolet	120	300 (482.803)	2:08:52	139.679	Report	
2012	February 25	30	James Buescher	Turner Motorsports	Chevrolet	120	300 (482.803)	2:18:51	129.636	Report	
2013	February 23	33	Tony Stewart	Richard Childress Racing	Chevrolet	120	300 (482.803)	2:08:37	139.951	Report	
2014	February 22	7	Regan Smith	JR Motorsports	Chevrolet	121*	302.5 (486.826)	2:02:28	148.204	Report	
2015	February 21	16	Ryan Reed*	Roush Fenway Racing	Ford	120	300 (482.803)	2:00:59	148.781	Report	
2016	February 20	88	Chase Elliott	JR Motorsports	Chevrolet	120	300 (482.803)	1:59:04	151.176	Report	
2017	February 25	16	Ryan Reed	Roush Fenway Racing	Ford	124*	310 (498.897)	2:38:47	117.141	Report	
2018	February 17	9	Tyler Reddick*	JR Motorsports	Chevrolet	143*	357.5 (575.34)	3:00:06	119.1	Report	
2019	February 16	1	Michael Annett	JR Motorsports	Chevrolet	120	300 (482.803)	1:58:41	151.664	Report	
2020	February 15	9	Noah Gragson	JR Motorsports	Chevrolet	120	300 (482.803)	2:11:44	136.64	Report	
2021	February 13	22	Austin Cindric	Team Penske	Ford	122*	305 (490.849)	2:34:12	118.677	Report	
2022	February 19	21	Austin Hill	Richard Childress Racing	Chevrolet	120	300 (482.803)	2:11:46	136.605	Report	
2023	February 18	21	Austin Hill	Richard Childress Racing	Chevrolet	125*	312.5 (502.919)	2:21:30	132.524	Report	
2024	February 19*	21	Austin Hill	Richard Childress Racing	Chevrolet	120	300 (482.803)	2:46:29	108.119	Report	
2025	February 15	2	Jesse Love	Richard Childress Racing	Chevrolet	126*	315 (506.943)	2:33:17	123.301	Report	
2026	February 14	21	Austin Hill	Richard Childress Racing	Chevrolet	120	300 (482.803)	2:24:21	116.618	Report	
2027	February 20									Report	

==== Notes ====
- 1964: Race shortened due to late start caused by three-hour rain delay.
- 1974: Race scheduled for 108 laps (270 miles) due to energy crisis.
- 1979: Race shortened due to rain.
- 1981, 2004, & 2024: Races postponed from Saturday to Monday due to rain.
- 2014, 2017, 2018, 2021, 2023, and 2025: Races extended due to NASCAR overtime.

==== Multiple winners (drivers) ====
# Wins	Driver	Years won
7	Dale Earnhardt	1982, 1986, 1990–1994
7	Tony Stewart	2005–2006, 2008–2011, 2013
5	Darrell Waltrip	1978–1979, 1983–1984, 1989
4	Austin Hill	2022–2024, 2026
3	Banjo Matthews	1955, 1958–1959
3	LeeRoy Yarbrough	1962–1963, 1969
3	Bill Dennis	1972–1974
3	Randy LaJoie	1997, 1999, 2001
3	Dale Earnhardt Jr.	2002–2004
2	Gober Sosebee	1950–1951
2	Cotton Owens	1953–1954
2	Tim Flock	1952, 1956
2	Tiny Lund	1964, 1970
2	Jack Ingram	1975, 1980
2	Geoff Bodine	1985, 1987
2	Ryan Reed	2015, 2017

==== Multiple winners (teams) ====
# Wins	Team	Years won
8	Dale Earnhardt, Inc./Chance 2	1986, 1990–1994, 2003–2004
8	Richard Childress Racing	2002, 2007, 2013, 2022–2026
5	JR Motorsports	2014, 2016, 2018–2020
4	Junie Donlavey	1972–1974, 1980
4	Kevin Harvick Incorporated	2005–2006, 2010–2011
3	DarWal, Inc.	1983–1984, 1989
3	Hendrick Motorsports	1985, 1987, 2009
2	Bondy Long	1969–1970
2	DiGard Racing	1978–1979
2	Roush Fenway Racing	2015, 2017

==== Manufacturer wins ====
# Wins	Make	Years won
37	Chevrolet	1975, 1977–1979, 1987, 1989, 1990–1994, 1996–2000, 2002–2007, 2009–2014, 2016, 2018–2020, 2022–2026
15	Ford	1959–1962, 1964–1966, 1969–1971, 1980, 1995, 2015, 2017, 2021
7	Pontiac	1981–1986, 2001
3	Mercury	1972–1974
2	Dodge	1968, 1976
1	Studebaker	1963
1	Plymouth	1967
1	Buick	1988
1	Toyota	2008

== Summer race ==
Winn-Dixie 250
- Corporate sponsor: Winn-Dixie, Coca-Cola
- First race: 2002
- Distance: 250 miles (400 km)
- Laps: 100; Stages 1/2: 30 each Final stage: 40
- Previous names: Stacker 2 / GNC Live Well 250 (2002); Winn-Dixie 250 (2003); Winn-Dixie 250 presented by PepsiCo (2004–2007); Winn-Dixie 250 Powered by Coca-Cola (2008); Subway Jalapeño 250 (2009–2012); Subway Firecracker 250 Powered by Coca-Cola (2013–2016); Coca Cola Firecracker 250 (2017–2018); Circle K Firecracker 250 (2019); Wawa 250 (2020–2025)
- Most wins (driver): Dale Earnhardt Jr. (3)
- Most wins (team): Joe Gibbs Racing; JR Motorsports (4)
- Most wins (manufacturer): Chevrolet (18)

The Winn-Dixie 250 Powered By Coca-Cola is a NASCAR O'Reilly Auto Parts Series race that is held at Daytona International Speedway. It takes place over 250-mile (400 km) during the summer the night before the NASCAR Cup Series' Coke Zero Sugar 400.

Ryan Sieg, is the defending winner of the event, having won it in 2026.

=== History ===
The race was previously run on Independence Day weekend until 2019. Since 2020 it takes place in late August.

Until 2006, there had been a different winner in each race. Dale Earnhardt Jr. became the first repeat winner when he won the 2006 event.

The 2010 running of the event marked the first of four races using the Nationwide Series version of the Car of Tomorrow, the other three being at Michigan, Richmond (September), and Charlotte (October).

=== Past winners ===
Year	Date	No.	Driver	Team	Manufacturer	Race distance		Race time	Average speed (mph)	Report	Ref
Year	Date	No.	Driver	Team	Manufacturer	Laps	Miles (km)	Race time	Average speed (mph)	Report	Ref
2002	July 5	87	Joe Nemechek	NEMCO Motorsports	Pontiac	100	250 (402.336)	1:59:09	125.892	Report	
2003	July 4	8	Dale Earnhardt Jr.	Chance 2 Motorsports	Chevrolet	100	250 (402.336)	1:37:35	153.715	Report	
2004	July 2	4	Mike Wallace	Biagi Brothers Racing	Ford	100	250 (402.336)	1:51:06	135.014	Report	
2005	July 1	8	Martin Truex Jr.	Chance 2 Motorsports	Chevrolet	104*	260 (418.429)	1:51:19	140.141	Report	
2006	June 30	8	Dale Earnhardt Jr.	Dale Earnhardt, Inc.	Chevrolet	103*	257.5 (414.406)	1:55:52	133.343	Report	
2007	July 7*	5	Kyle Busch	Hendrick Motorsports	Chevrolet	102*	255 (410.382)	1:50:00	139.091	Report	
2008	July 4	20	Denny Hamlin	Joe Gibbs Racing	Toyota	105*	262.5 (422.452)	1:41:07	155.761	Report	
2009	July 3	29	Clint Bowyer	Richard Childress Racing	Chevrolet	102*	255 (410.382)	2:04:28	122.924	Report	
2010	July 2	3	Dale Earnhardt Jr.	Richard Childress Racing	Chevrolet	102*	255 (410.382)	1:44:37	146.248	Report	
2011	July 1	20	Joey Logano	Joe Gibbs Racing	Toyota	100	250 (402.336)	1:49:57	136.426	Report	
2012	July 6	1	Kurt Busch	Phoenix Racing	Chevrolet	101*	252.5 (406.359)	1:54:44	132.045	Report	
2013	July 5	18	Matt Kenseth	Joe Gibbs Racing	Toyota	101*	252.5 (406.359)	1:43:56	145.767	Report	
2014	July 4	5	Kasey Kahne	JR Motorsports	Chevrolet	103*	257.5 (414.406)	1:38:24	157.012	Report	
2015	July 4	33	Austin Dillon	Richard Childress Racing	Chevrolet	104*	260 (418.429)	1:57:28	132.804	Report	
2016	July 1	98	Aric Almirola	Biagi–DenBeste Racing	Ford	103*	257.5 (414.406)	2:07:29	121.192	Report	
2017	June 30– July 1*	9	William Byron	JR Motorsports	Chevrolet	104*	260 (418.429)	2:13:56	116.476	Report	
2018	July 6	42	Kyle Larson	Chip Ganassi Racing	Chevrolet	105*	262.5 (422.452)	2:01:35	131.541	Report	
2019	July 5–6*	16	Ross Chastain	Kaulig Racing	Chevrolet	100	250 (402.336)	1:59:15	125.786	Report	
2020	August 28	11	Justin Haley	Kaulig Racing	Chevrolet	100	250 (402.336)	2:02:55	122.034	Report	
2021	August 27–28*	11	Justin Haley	Kaulig Racing	Chevrolet	100	250 (402.336)	2:03:12	121.753	Report	
2022	August 26–27*	51	Jeremy Clements	Jeremy Clements Racing	Chevrolet	118*	295 (474.756)	2:36:11	113.328	Report	
2023	August 25	7	Justin Allgaier	JR Motorsports	Chevrolet	110*	275 (442.569)	2:12:14	124.779	Report	
2024	August 23	20	Ryan Truex	Joe Gibbs Racing	Toyota	102*	255 (410.382)	2:10:34	117.182	Report	
2025	August 22	88	Connor Zilisch (Note: Kligerman replaced Zilisch on Lap 15 because of recuperation from a collarbone injury suffered at Watkins Glen two-weeks prior. Officially, Zilisch got credit for winning the race, but Kligerman drove the car to win)	JR Motorsports	Chevrolet	104*	260 (418.429)	2:15:28	115.157	Report	
2026	August 28	38	Ryan Sieg	RSS Racing	Chevrolet	105*	262.5 (422.452)	1:58:51	132.520	Report	
2027	August 27									Report	

==== Notes ====
Races have been lengthened due to NASCAR overtime 17 times, notable for being the most overtime finishes of any race in the series:

- 2012 and 2013 252.5 miles (101 laps)
- 2007, 2009, 2010 and 2024: 255 miles (102 laps)
- 2006, 2014, and 2016: 257.5 miles (103 laps)
- 2005, 2015, 2017, and 2025: 260 miles (104 laps)
- 2008, 2018 and 2026: 262.5 miles (105 laps)
- 2022: 295 miles (118 laps)
- 2023: 275 miles (110 laps)

The following races have been rescheduled from their original dates.

- 2007: Postponed from Friday night to Saturday morning because of rain.
- 2017 and 2021: Race started on Friday night, suspended until Saturday afternoon because of rain.
- 2019 and 2022: Race started on Friday and finished after midnight on Saturday after a rain delay.

==== Multiple winner (driver) ====
# Wins	Driver	Years won
3	Dale Earnhardt Jr.	2003, 2006, 2010
2	Justin Haley	2020–2021

==== Multiple winners (teams) ====
# Wins	Team	Years won
4	Joe Gibbs Racing	2008, 2011, 2013, 2024
4	JR Motorsports	2014, 2017, 2023, 2025
3	Dale Earnhardt, Inc./Chance 2	2003, 2005–2006
3	Richard Childress Racing	2009–2010, 2015
3	Kaulig Racing	2019–2021
2	Biagi–DenBeste Racing	2004, 2016

==== Manufacturer wins ====
# Wins	Make	Years won
18	(United States) Chevrolet	2003, 2005–2007, 2009–2010, 2012, 2014–2015, 2017–2023, 2025–2026
4	(Japan) Toyota	2008, 2011, 2013, 2024
2	(United States) Ford	2004, 2016
1	(United States) Pontiac	2002

=== Notable moments ===
- 2003: Dale Earnhardt Jr. led all 100 laps en route to victory.
- 2004: First race in which the cars ran a roof spoiler. The last 10 laps involved several lead changes. Dale Earnhardt Jr. took the lead with 10 laps to go. With 3 laps remaining, Michael Waltrip and Jason Leffler passed Dale Jr., putting Waltrip in the lead. Leffler then went for the lead and the two cars raced nose-to-nose for over a lap before Waltrip cut in front of Leffler off Turn Two on the final lap; Leffler hit Waltrip and Waltrip's car spun into the inside wall. NASCAR kept the green flag out (there is often a caution flag when a crash occurs) as Dale challenged Leffler for the lead. Leffler swerved and Dale crashed into the wall in Turn Four, allowing Mike Wallace to pass everyone for the victory. Despite crossing the line second, Leffler was relegated to the last car on the lead lap for aggressive driving, giving Greg Biffle (who finished 3rd) second.
- 2010: Dale Earnhardt Jr. drove a Chevrolet fielded by Richard Childress and numbered 3 to an unchallenged win. It was Junior's final time to drive the No. 3.
- 2011: With the new two-car tandem draft in effect, Kevin Harvick Incorporated swept the top four positions in qualifying. The lead changed a then-race record 35 times, primarily between Cup drivers Carl Edwards, Kevin Harvick, Jamie McMurray, Tony Stewart, Clint Bowyer as well as Nationwide Series regulars Aric Almirola, Ricky Stenhouse Jr., Trevor Bayne, and part-timer Danica Patrick. Eric McClure crashed hard after contact with teammate Mike Bliss, requiring a trip to the hospital. At the end of the race, a multi-car pileup involving 16 cars, ensued when Patrick, who had slapped the Turn One wall on the final lap, made contact with Mike Wallace approaching the start-finish line, enabling Joey Logano and Kyle Busch to slip by and finish 1–2.
- 2012: Kurt Busch, fired from Penske Racing the year before for several off-track incidents, stormed to the win in the most competitive Daytona race for NASCAR's second-tier touring series in any of its varied incarnations at the time (Late Model Sportsman, Busch Grand National, Nationwide Series). The lead changed a series track-record 42 times as on the final lap Busch roared past Joey Logano and Elliott Sadler with Ricky Stenhouse Jr. pushing him; Austin Dillon in Richard Childress' No. 3 raced into the fray pushed by Michael Annett in a Richard Petty No. 43; at the stripe Dillon got hit and spun through the trioval grass as Sadler tried for the win at the stripe; Dillon spun back into traffic and a huge crash ensued.
- 2015: NBC returned to NASCAR with the running of the Subway Firecracker 250 on NBCSN. There were two big ones that happened, one with 10 laps to go and the other one with just 5 laps to go.
- 2018: Originally Justin Haley was thought to be the winner of the race, but video evidence revealed that he dipped below the yellow line and Kyle Larson had actually won the race. There were two big ones that happened, one with 19 laps to go with 17 cars wrecked and the other one with just 3 laps to go with 11 cars wrecked.
- 2020: Third Daytona race of the 2020 season. A 300 km road course event was held on August 15. The event replaced the road course date at Watkins Glen International, which was removed due to the COVID-19 pandemic.
- 2025: Parker Kligerman replaced Connor Zilisch on lap 15 because of recuperation from a collarbone injury suffered at Watkins Glen two-weeks prior. Officially, Zilisch got credit for winning the race, but Kligerman drove the car to win.
- 2026: After a late-race caution on lap 97 occurred, Ryan Sieg would pull off a massive upset in overtime, holding off the charging JR Motorsports cars for his first career win in his 424th start, and second ever win, after the 2023 DoorDash 250 for his team, RSS Racing.

== Former road course race ==
Super Start Batteries 188
- Corporate sponsor: O'Reilly Auto Parts
- First race: 2020
- Last race: 2021
- Distance: 187.72 miles (302.11 km)
- Laps: 52; Stages 1/2: 15 each Final stage: 22
- Previous names: UNOH 188 (2020)
- Most wins (driver): Austin Cindric; Ty Gibbs (1)
- Most wins (team): Team Penske; Joe Gibbs Racing (1)
- Most wins (manufacturer): Ford; Toyota (1)

The Super Start Batteries 188 was a NASCAR Xfinity Series race on the Daytona International Speedway infield road course in Daytona Beach, Florida.

The event was developed in 2020 as a temporary event in response to New York state authorities cancelling the Watkins Glen race because of state-related lockdowns, the race returned in 2021 to replace the California 300 at Fontana for the same reason. The Daytona road course serves as NASCAR's emergency contingency plans in case of cancellations of other events.

Ty Gibbs was the final race winner in the event.

=== History ===
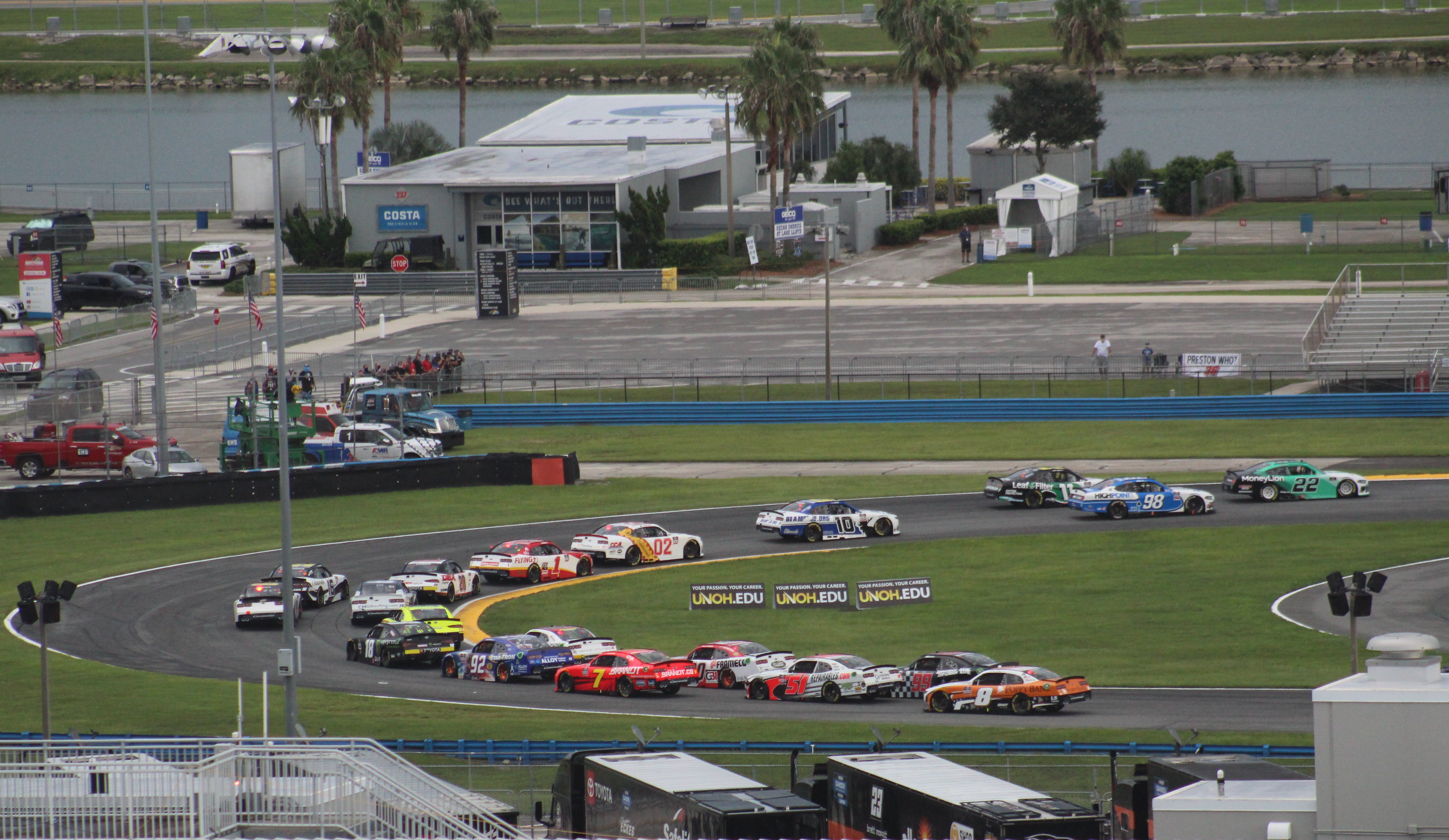
Cars file through the International Horseshoe on a restart in 2020

The Daytona road course, which uses elements of the 2.5 mi (4.0 km) speedway oval, is commonly used for the 24 Hours of Daytona sports car race and Daytona 200 motorcycle race. In March 2020, NASCAR announced the NASCAR Cup Series' Busch Clash exhibition race would use the road course instead of the oval beginning in 2021 as part of a plan to have teams use the sixth-generation chassis for the opening race of the season instead of the new seventh-generation chassis on the oval after numerous incidents in the 2020 race to prevent teams from using the new chassis and damaging them in crashes.

In July 2020, the COVID-19 pandemic forced the Zippo 200 at The Glen road course race at Watkins Glen International, which was planned for August, to be replaced by the temporary Daytona road course event due to New York's quarantine rules for out-of-state visitors. While much of the road course layout remained the same as the sports car configuration, NASCAR added a chicane exiting the oval's turn four to allow cars to slow down entering the braking-heavy turn one. Austin Cindric, driving for Team Penske, won the event in 2020, which was delayed two hours by lightning; it was Cindric's fifth win in six races.

Although intended to be a temporary race, the 300 kilometer race returned to the Xfinity Series schedule in 2021 after the originally-scheduled race weekend at Auto Club Speedway was canceled due to concerns related to COVID-19. O'Reilly Auto Parts took over naming rights for the race weekend, naming the Xfinity event the Super Start Batteries 188. Ty Gibbs won in his Xfinity Series debut, becoming the sixth driver in series history to do so and the series' youngest road course winner at 18 years, four months, and 16 days.

=== Past winners ===
Year	Date	No.	Driver	Team	Manufacturer	Race Distance		Race Time	Average Speed (mph)	Report	Ref
Year	Date	No.	Driver	Team	Manufacturer	Laps	Miles (km)	Race Time	Average Speed (mph)	Report	Ref
2020	August 15	22	Austin Cindric	Team Penske	Ford	52	187.72 (302.106)	2:17:32	81.894	Report	
2021	February 20	54	Ty Gibbs	Joe Gibbs Racing	Toyota	56*	202.16 (325.344)	2:35:05	78.213	Report	

=== Notes ===
- 2021: Race extended due to a NASCAR Overtime finish.

=== Manufacturer wins ===
# Wins	Make	Years won
1	(United States) Ford	2020
1	(Japan) Toyota	2021

Previous race: NASCAR O'Reilly Auto Parts Series Championship Race	NASCAR O'Reilly Auto Parts Series; United Rentals 300	Next race: Bennett Transportation & Logistics 250

Previous race: Nu Way 225	NASCAR O'Reilly Auto Parts Series; Winn-Dixie 250	Next race: Fleeto 200
