= James Buescher =

American racing driver (born 1990)

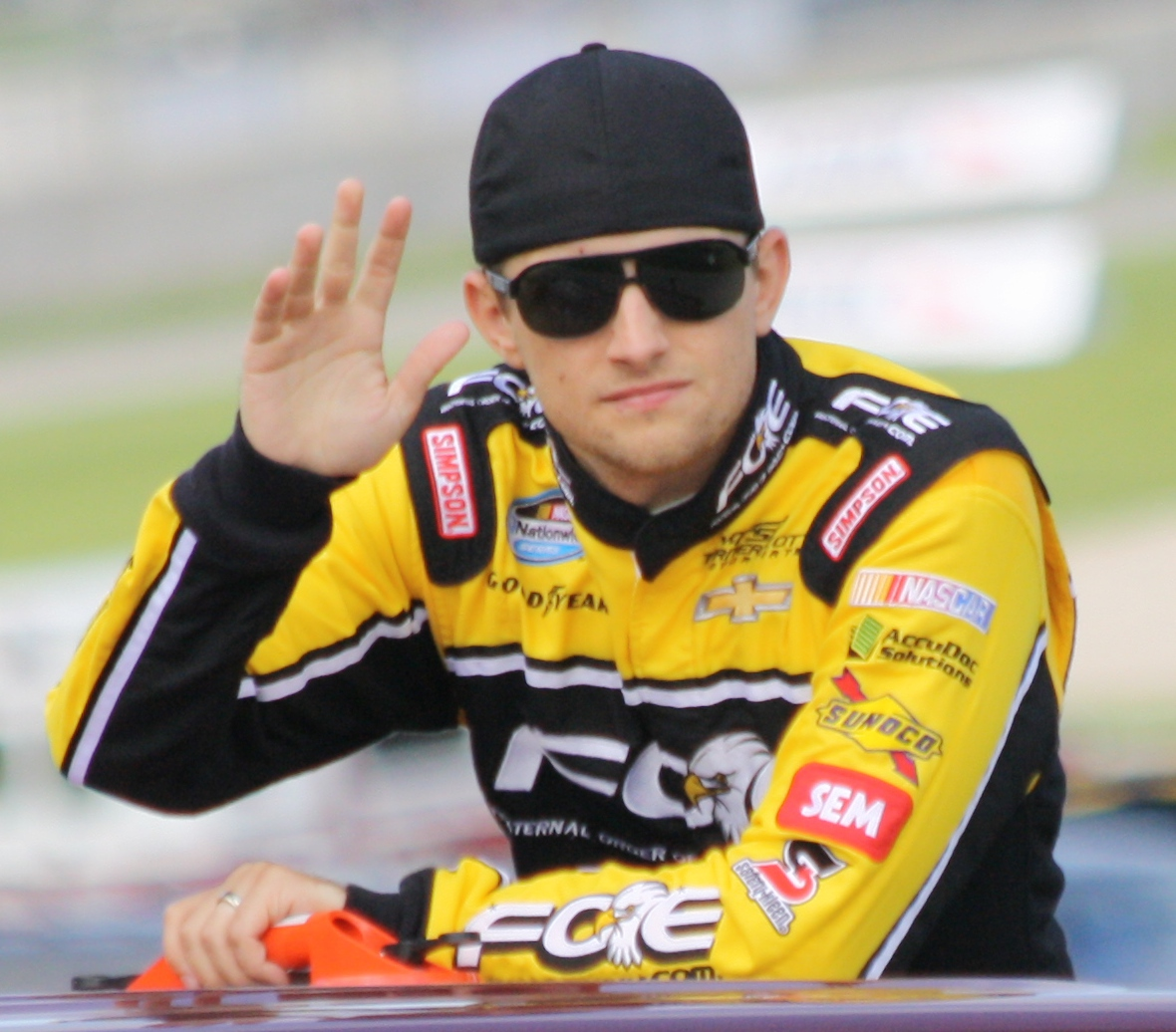
- Buescher at Road America in 2013
- Born: James Howard Buescher; March 26, 1990 (age 36); Melbourne, Florida, U.S.
- Achievements: 2012 Camping World Truck Series Champion; 2006 ASA Late Model Series South Champion; 2004 Bandolero Young Gun National Champion
- Awards: 2006 ASA Most Popular Driver

NASCAR O'Reilly Auto Parts Series career
- 91 races run over 7 years
- 2014 position: 10th
- Best finish: 10th (2014)
- First race: 2008 Bashas' Supermarkets 200 (Phoenix)
- Last race: 2014 Ford EcoBoost 300 (Homestead)
- First win: 2012 DRIVE4COPD 300 (Daytona)
Wins	Top tens	Poles
1	16	2

NASCAR FedEx Freight Truck Series career
- 121 races run over 9 years
- 2021 position: 88th
- Best finish: 1st (2012)
- First race: 2008 Ford 200 (Homestead)
- Last race: 2021 NextEra Energy 250 (Daytona)
- First win: 2012 SFP 250 (Kansas)
- Last win: 2013 Fan Appreciation 200 (Iowa)
Wins	Top tens	Poles
6	62	5

NASCAR Canada Series career
- 1 race run over 1 year
- 2013 position: 59th
- Best finish: 59th (2013)
- First race: 2013 Pinty's Presents the Clarington 200 (CTMP)
Wins	Top tens	Poles
0	0	0
- Statistics up to date as of December 30, 2021.

James Howard Buescher (born March 26, 1990) is an American semi-retired professional stock car racing driver. He is the 2012 NASCAR Camping World Truck Series champion.

After parting ways with NTS Motorsports in 2015, Buescher became a real estate agent. He owns and operates his own real estate agency, The Buescher Group, with his wife Kris in their home state of Texas. The company is part of the Compass Real Estate company. He would be without a ride until 2020, when he joined Niece Motorsports for one Truck Series race in 2020 followed by a race in 2021.

Buescher is the cousin of 2015 NASCAR Xfinity Series champion Chris Buescher, who competes full-time in the NASCAR Cup Series for RFK Racing.

== Early career ==
Buescher's earliest racing success came in 2004 when he became a national champion in the Young Gun division of Bandolero racing at Texas Motor Speedway. He then moved on to the American Speed Association where, in 2006, he was named Most Popular Driver as well as winning the Late Model Series South championship. For 2007, Buescher ran a part-time schedule in both the ARCA Series and the NASCAR Busch East Series. He became the youngest winner in ARCA series history when he won at USA International Speedway in his series debut. In six more races that season, he would earn an additional five top-ten finishes as well as finish in the top-ten in all four Busch East races he entered.

== NASCAR Nationwide Series ==
In 2008, Buescher signed with Braun Racing to run six races in the Nationwide Series (now known as the Xfinity Series). He made his debut at Phoenix International Raceway in the No. 32 Great Clips Toyota. He started 17th and stayed in the top 20 all race long, finishing 18th. He would earn his first top-ten at Gateway International Raceway (finishing 7th) and his first pole at Memphis Motorsports Park. He would spend most of the 2009 season in the Camping World Truck Series. Near the end of 2009, Buescher was announced as the 2010 driver for Phoenix Racing. To prepare for the season, he ran two races in the No. 1 Miccosukee Resorts Chevrolet, finishing 11th at Texas and 13th at Phoenix.

A week prior to the beginning of the 2010 season, it was announced that Miccosukee was dropping its sponsorship of all NASCAR teams, effective immediately. Despite this setback, Buescher responded with an eighth-place finish in the season opener at Daytona International Speedway. On May 12, 2010, Buescher parted ways with Phoenix Racing and returned to the Camping World Truck Series. He made his return to the Nationwide Series at Kansas Speedway in September driving for Turner Motorsports in the No. 11 Great Clips Toyota. He ran four additional races for Turner, earning his second career pole at Texas in the No. 30 Chevrolet.

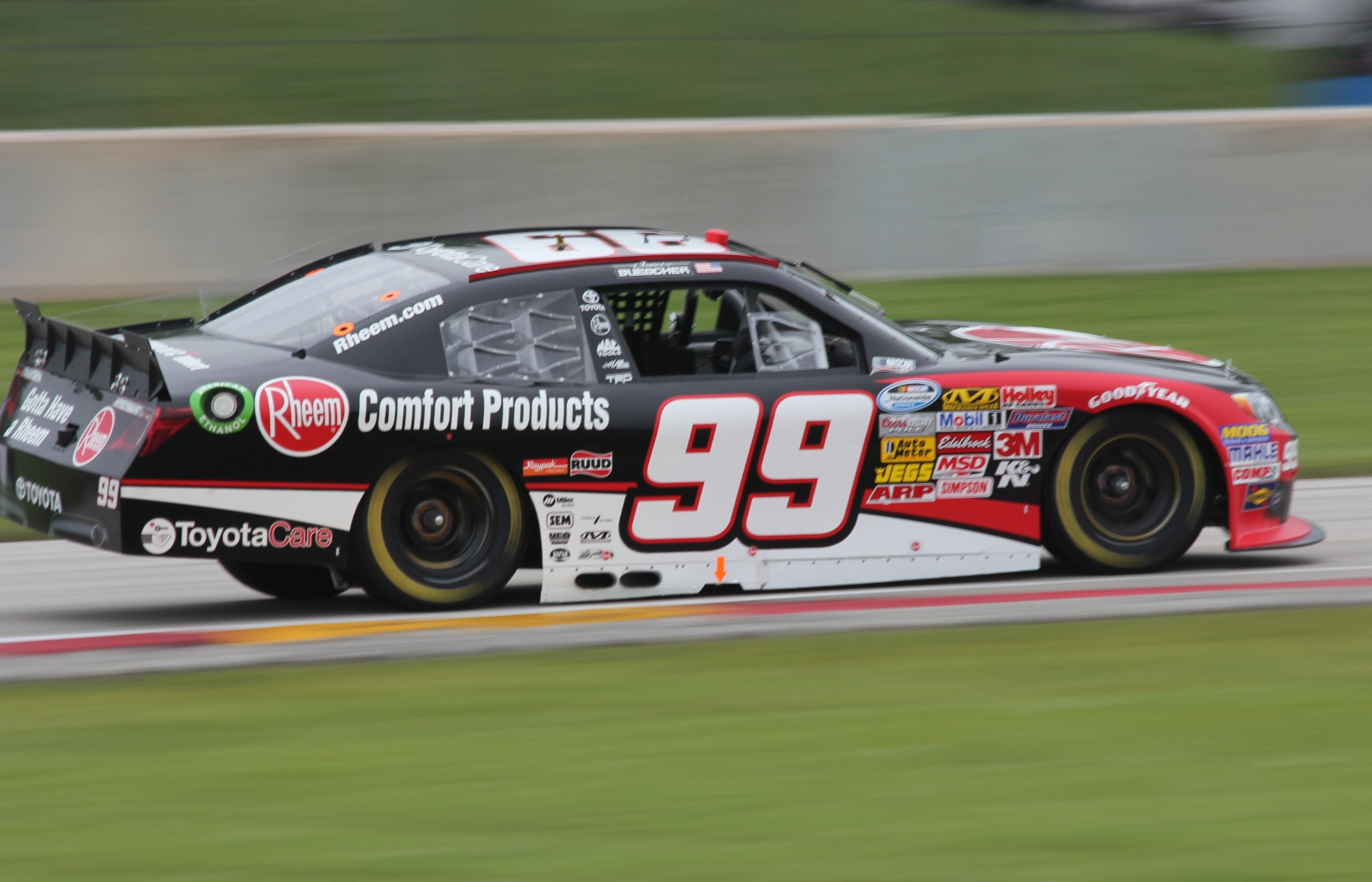
Buescher in the No. 99 Nationwide car in 2014

For 2011, it was announced that Buescher would run part-time in the series, sharing the No. 30 Chevrolet with several other drivers. On February 25, 2012, Buescher won the season opener at Daytona, avoiding a massive crash on the final lap and coming from 11th to win, leading only the final lap.

After the 2013 season, in which Buescher finished third in Truck Series points, he announced that he would be competing for RAB Racing in the 2014 NASCAR Nationwide Series, driving the No. 99 Toyota. Rheem was Buescher's primary sponsor, and he went on to finish tenth in 2014 Nationwide Series points. Buescher returned to the Truck Series briefly in 2015 before retiring.

== NASCAR Truck Series ==
Buescher made his Truck Series debut in the 2008 Ford 200, the season finale. Driving the No. 15 Ergon Hyprene Toyota for Billy Ballew Motorsports, he qualified 10th and finished 19th. Prior to the start of the 2009 season, it was announced that Buescher would be replacing Brendan Gaughan in the No. 10 International Maxx Force Diesel Ford for Circle Bar Racing. He found little success over the course of the season and finished 14th in points. In 25 races, he accumulated just three top-tens, including a fifth at The Milwaukee Mile. At the end of the season, Buescher left the team to focus on his new Nationwide Series ride.

It was also announced that Buescher would return to the Truck Series for up to 19 races in 2010 with Turner Motorsports.

After running the April Nashville race in the No. 90 Great Clips Toyota for Stringer Motorsports, Buescher ran the balance of the 2010 season in the No. 31 truck. In 21 races for Turner, Buescher would earn ten top-tens with two finishes of second. He narrowly missed a win at New Hampshire, giving up the lead to Kyle Busch on a green-white-checker finish. Despite not running the first three events of the season, Buescher finished 11th in the final points standings, just 16 points out of tenth.

"[W]e were all pretty shocked...At the time it was the worst feeling in the world, but looking back on it's probably a blessing in disguise because we were able to come on strong the rest of the season and make a run for the championship."

— Buescher, on failing to qualify at Phoenix

Turner Scott Motorsports announced that Buescher would return to the team for the 2011 season, running the full 25-race schedule. A promising start saw Buescher lead the first 55 laps at Daytona before his involvement in a multi-car crash on lap 97 left him ninth. However, Buescher failed to qualify for the next race at Phoenix. The No. 31 team was not yet guaranteed a starting spot because it had not attempted every event the previous season. Two races later, a wreck with Jeffrey Earnhardt at Martinsville dropped Buescher to 20th in the driver standings. Buescher responded to the setbacks with thirteen consecutive top-ten finishes including his first Truck Series pole position at Texas and a runner-up finish at IRP. A tenth-place finish at Atlanta gave Buescher the championship lead in a tight points battle with Austin Dillon and Johnny Sauter. Buescher lost the lead two events later but stayed competitive in the three-man race. He earned his second career pole at Talladega and was within eleven points of Dillon with two races remaining.

At Texas, Buescher won another pole position and led 56 laps, battling side-by-side with Dillon for much of the event. However, while running second, a caution waved on lap 142 for David Starr's blown engine. During the slowdown, Buescher ran out of fuel on the backstretch and had to be pushed to pit road. He lost fuel pressure and was lapped twice by the pace car before successfully re-firing his car. The 19th-place finish left Buescher with an outside chance at best for the championship finale at Homestead. There, despite scoring another pole, great runs by Dillon and Sauter and a run-in with Kevin Harvick solidified Buescher's third-place finish in the final point standings.

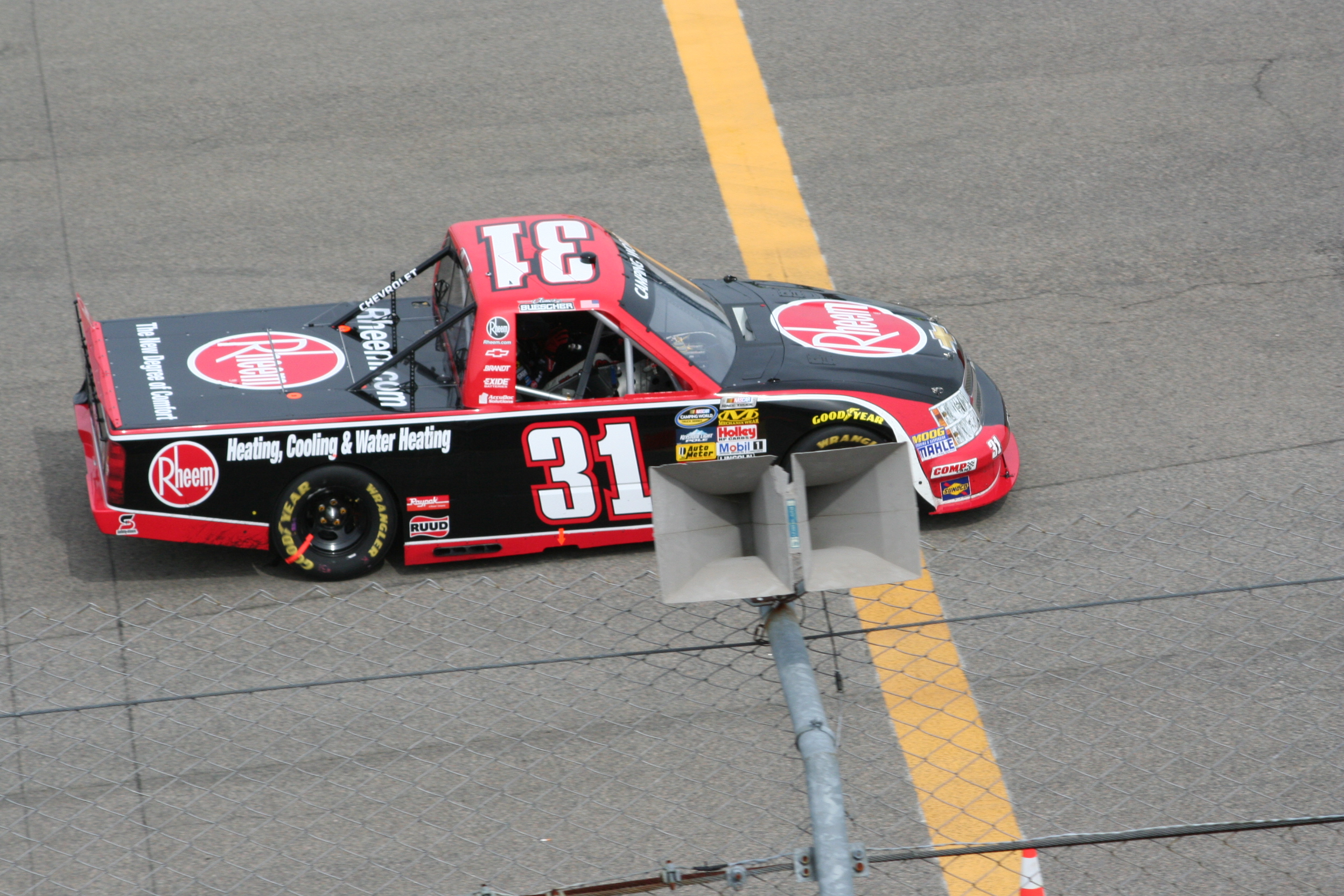
Buescher's 2013 truck at Rockingham Speedway

Buescher returned to Turner Motorsports for the 2012 season as a title favorite. After crashing on the final lap in the season opener at Daytona, he led 103 laps and earned his first career Truck Series victory at Kansas. He quickly followed with early-season wins at Kentucky and Chicagoland. The Chicago win began a run of nine top-ten finishes in ten races for Buescher. The streak, which included another dominating victory at Kentucky, secured a 21-point lead for Buescher over Ty Dillon, the younger brother of 2011 championship rival Austin, with three races remaining. Subpar finishes in the next two events, including a late-race blown tire at Phoenix, meant Buescher needed to score at least a seventh-place finish at Homestead to clinch the title over Dillon and Timothy Peters. Buescher struggled in the finale, but went on to finish 13th and claim the 2012 Truck Series championship by six points over Peters, the first such title for Turner Motorsports. He survived a final push from Dillon, who closed to within one point of Buescher but crashed with three laps remaining while battling Kyle Larson for second place. Buescher's four wins were the most for a Turner driver since the team's entry into the series in 2009.

Buescher left to drive full-time in the Nationwide Series for RAB Racing in 2014. However, he had a lackluster season, compared to his Truck Series success. In 2015, Buescher was picked up by NTS Motorsports to drive the No. 31 Chevrolet Silverado for a part-time schedule; Buescher participated in three races. However, after not being competitive in a well-funded ride, Buescher retired to help take care of his children.

In 2020, Buescher returned to the series in a one-off appearance for Niece Motorsports at Texas. He would return to Niece in 2021 for the season-opener at Daytona. With Carson Hocevar driving the No. 42 full-time that year, Buescher instead drove the team's No. 44 truck. His race would end early when Tanner Gray had an issue before the start and sustained heavy damage to the front end of his truck as a result of contact. He would ultimately finish 36th.

== Personal life ==
Born in Melbourne, Florida, Buescher was raised in Plano, Texas. Buescher has a cousin, Chris, who races in the NASCAR Cup Series for RFK Racing. He is the son in law of former car owner Steve Turner. Buescher married Krishtian Turner in January 2012, in a ceremony performed in Costa Rica. They have two children. In November 2014, Buescher and his wife founded The Buescher Foundation to provide resources and financial support to families adopting domestically.

== Motorsports career results ==
=== Racing career summary ===
Season	Series	Team	Races	Wins	Top 5	Top 10	Points	Position
2007	NASCAR Busch East Series	Marsh Racing	4	0	0	4	589	28th
2007	ARCA Re/Max Series	Country Joe Racing	7	1	4	6	1405	30th
2008	NASCAR Camping World West Series	Marsh Racing	1	0	0	1	150	53rd
2008	NASCAR Camping World East Series	Marsh Racing	1	0	0	0	200	46th
2008	ARCA Re/Max Series	Win-Tron Racing	7	0	0	2	880	36th
2008	NASCAR Craftsman Truck Series	Billy Balew Motorsports	1	0	0	0	106	82nd
2008	NASCAR Nationwide Series	Braun Racing	6	0	0	1	692	56th
2009	ARCA Re/Max Series	Win-Tron Racing	4	2	3	3	735	39th
2009	NASCAR Camping World Truck Series	Circle Bar Racing	25	0	1	3	2884	14th
2009	NASCAR Nationwide Series	Phoenix Racing	2	0	0	0	254	90th
2010	ARCA Racing Series	Phoenix Racing	3	0	1	1	450	49th
2010	NASCAR Nationwide Series	Phoenix Racing	10	0	0	1	1347	36th
2010	NASCAR Nationwide Series	Turner Motorsports	5	0	0	0	1347	36th
2010	NASCAR Camping World Truck Series	Turner Motorsports	21	0	6	10	2963	11th
2010	NASCAR Camping World Truck Series	Stringer Motorsports	1	0	0	0	2963	11th
2011	ARCA Racing Series	Turner Motorsports	1	0	1	1	225	85th
2011	NASCAR Camping World Truck Series	Turner Motorsports	24	0	10	19	859	**3rd**
2011	NASCAR Nationwide Series	Turner Motorsports	11	0	1	3	0	NC†
2012	NASCAR Camping World Truck Series	Turner Motorsports	22	4	10	14	808	**1st**
2012	NASCAR Nationwide Series	Turner Motorsports	20	1	2	8	0	NC†
2013	NASCAR Canadian Tire Series	22 Racing	1	0	0	0	13	59th
2013	NASCAR Camping World Truck Series	Turner Scott Motorsports	22	2	4	14	761	**3rd**
2013	NASCAR Nationwide Series	Turner Scott Motorsports	4	0	1	1	0	NC†
2014	NASCAR Nationwide Series	RAB Racing	33	0	0	2	868	10th
2015	NASCAR Camping World Truck Series	NTS Motorsports	3	0	0	2	100	36th
2020	NASCAR Gander Outdoors Truck Series	Niece Motorsports	1	0	0	0	22	56th
2021	NASCAR Camping World Truck Series	Niece Motorsports	1	0	0	0	1	88th

^{†} As Buescher was a guest driver, he was ineligible for championship points.

=== NASCAR ===
(key) (Bold − Pole position awarded by qualifying time. Italics − Pole position earned by points standings or practice time. * – Most laps led.)

==== Nationwide Series ====
NASCAR Nationwide Series results
Year	Team	No.	Make	1	2	3	4	5	6	7	8	9	10	11	12	13	14	15	16	17	18	19	20	21	22	23	24	25	26	27	28	29	30	31	32	33	34	35	NNSC	Pts	Ref
2008	Braun Racing	32	Toyota	DAY	CAL	LVS	ATL	BRI	NSH	TEX	PHO; 18	MXC	TAL	RCH	DAR	CLT	DOV	NSH	KEN; 14	MLW; 14	NHA	DAY	CHI	GTY; 7	IRP; 28	CGV	GLN	MCH	BRI	CAL	RCH	DOV	KAN	CLT	**MEM**; 19	TEX	PHO	HOM	56th	692	
2009	Phoenix Racing	1	Chevy	DAY	CAL	LVS	BRI	TEX	NSH	PHO	TAL	RCH	DAR	CLT	DOV	NSH	KEN	MLW	NHA	DAY	CHI	GTY	IRP	IOW	GLN	MCH	BRI	CGV	ATL	RCH	DOV	KAN	CAL	CLT	MEM	TEX; 11	PHO; 13	HOM	90th	254	
2010	Phoenix Racing	1	Chevy	DAY; 8	CAL; 13	LVS; 29	BRI; 36	NSH; 34	PHO; 28	TEX; 17	TAL; 37	RCH; 12	DAR; 31	DOV	CLT	NSH	KEN	ROA	NHA	DAY	CHI	GTY	IRP	IOW	GLN	MCH	BRI	CGV	ATL	RCH	DOV								36th	1347	
2010	Turner Motorsports	11	Toyota																													KAN; 35	CAL; 17				PHO; 22	HOM	36th	1347	
2010	Turner Motorsports	10	Toyota																															CLT; 16	GTY				36th	1347	
2010	Turner Motorsports	30	Chevy																																	**TEX**; 37			36th	1347	
2011	Turner Motorsports	34	Chevy	DAY	PHO	LVS	BRI; 13	CAL	TEX																														103rd	0^{1}	
2011	Turner Motorsports	30	Chevy							TAL; 23	NSH	RCH; 23	DAR	DOV; 8	IOW; 9	CLT	CHI	MCH	ROA	DAY	KEN	NHA	NSH	IRP; 2	IOW	GLN; 17	CGV	BRI	ATL	RCH	CHI	DOV	KAN; 18	CLT	TEX; 17	PHO; 30			103rd	0^{1}	
2011	Turner Motorsports	32	Chevy																																		HOM; 14		103rd	0^{1}	
2012	Turner Motorsports	30	Chevy	DAY; 1	PHO; 12	LVS; 14	BRI; 14	CAL; 12	TEX	RCH; 12	TAL; 7	DAR; 9	IOW	CLT; 7	DOV; 9	MCH; 2	ROA	KEN; 10	DAY; 34	NHA	CHI; 15	IND; 26	IOW	GLN	CGV	BRI	ATL; 23	RCH; 11	CHI	KEN; 13	DOV	CLT; 9	KAN; 28	TEX	PHO	HOM			103rd	0^{1}	
2013	Turner Scott Motorsports	34	Chevy	DAY	PHO	LVS	BRI	CAL	TEX	RCH	TAL	DAR	CLT	DOV	IOW	MCH	ROA; 14	KEN	DAY; 2	NHA	CHI	IND	IOW	GLN	MOH	BRI	ATL	RCH	CHI	KEN	DOV	KAN; 15	CLT; 11	TEX	PHO	HOM			99th	0^{1}	
2014	RAB Racing	99	Toyota	DAY; 16	PHO; 12	LVS; 18	BRI; 13	CAL; 16	TEX; 13	DAR; 25	RCH; 10	TAL; 29	IOW; 19	CLT; 11	DOV; 15	MCH; 15	ROA; 17	KEN; 14	DAY; 14	NHA; 22	CHI; 23	IND; 21	IOW; 26	GLN; 11	MOH; 25	BRI; 9	ATL; 19	RCH; 19	CHI; 18	KEN; 14	DOV; 15	KAN; 21	CLT; 31	TEX; 24	PHO; 14	HOM; 18			10th	868	

==== Camping World Truck Series ====
NASCAR Camping World Truck Series results
Year	Team	No.	Make	1	2	3	4	5	6	7	8	9	10	11	12	13	14	15	16	17	18	19	20	21	22	23	24	25	NCWTC	Pts	Ref
2008	Billy Ballew Motorsports	15	Toyota	DAY	CAL	ATL	MAR	KAN	CLT	MFD	DOV	TEX	MCH	MLW	MEM	KEN	IRP	NSH	BRI	GTW	NHA	LVS	TAL	MAR	ATL	TEX	PHO	HOM; 19	82nd	106	
2009	Circle Bar Racing	10	Ford	DAY; 25	CAL; 13	ATL; 14	MAR; 11	KAN; 12	CLT; 12	DOV; 24	TEX; 18	MCH; 33	MLW; 5	MEM; 20	KEN; 8	IRP; 6	NSH; 17	BRI; 13	CHI; 20	IOW; 14	GTW; 23	NHA; 17	LVS; 13	MAR; 11	TAL; 15	TEX; 17	PHO; 23	HOM; 18	14th	2884	
2010	Stringer Motorsports	90	Toyota	DAY	ATL	MAR	NSH; 13																						11th	2963	
2010	Turner Motorsports	31	Chevy					KAN; 16	DOV; 2	CLT; 4	TEX; 6	MCH; 16	IOW; 5	GTY; 12	IRP; 5	POC; 11	NSH; 16	DAR; 7	BRI; 33	CHI; 12	KEN; 22	NHA; 2	LVS; 3	MAR; 12	TAL; 6	TEX; 6	PHO; 11	HOM; 19	11th	2963	
2011	Turner Motorsports	31	Chevy	DAY; 9*	PHO; DNQ	DAR; 5	MAR; 35	NSH; 5	DOV; 8	CLT; 4	KAN; 4	**TEX**; 9	KEN; 9	IOW; 7	NSH; 7	IRP; 2*	POC; 3	MCH; 4	BRI; 4	ATL; 10	CHI; 11	NHA; 7	KEN; 3	LVS; 21	**TAL**; 3	MAR; 10	**TEX**; 19	**HOM**; 12	3rd	859	
2012	Turner Motorsports	31	Chevy	DAY; 17	MAR; 3	CAR; 2	KAN; 1*	CLT; 22	DOV; 7	TEX; 15	KEN; 1*	IOW; 30*	CHI; 1	POC; 2	MCH; 5	BRI; 7	ATL; 3	IOW; 17	KEN; 1*	LVS; 6	TAL; 3	MAR; 6	TEX; 11	PHO; 17	HOM; 13				1st	808	
2013	Turner Scott Motorsports	31	Chevy	DAY; 13	MAR; 14	CAR; 14	**KAN**; 6	CLT; 6	DOV; 15	TEX; 9	KEN; 4	IOW; 3	ELD; 19	POC; 21	MCH; 1	BRI; 7	**MSP**; 9	IOW; 1	CHI; 8	LVS; 9	TAL; 26	MAR; 10	TEX; 6	PHO; 9	HOM; 13				3rd	761	
2015	NTS Motorsports	31	Chevy	DAY; 17	ATL; 8	MAR; 7	KAN	CLT	DOV	TEX	GTW	IOW	KEN	ELD	POC	MCH	BRI	MSP	CHI	NHA	LVS	TAL	MAR	TEX	PHO	HOM			36th	100	
2020	Niece Motorsports	42	Chevy	DAY	LVS	CLT	ATL	HOM	POC	KEN	TEX	KAN	KAN	MCH	DAY	DOV	GTW	DAR	RCH	BRI	LVS	TAL	KAN	TEX; 15	MAR	PHO			56th	22	
2021	Niece Motorsports	44	Chevy	DAY; 36	DAY	LVS	ATL	BRI	RCH	KAN	DAR	COA	CLT	TEX	NSH	POC	KNX	GLN	GTW	DAR	BRI	LVS	TAL	MAR	PHO				88th	1	

^{*} Season still in progress
^{1} Ineligible for series points

==== Camping World East Series ====
NASCAR Camping World East Series results
Year	Team	No.	Make	1	2	3	4	5	6	7	8	9	10	11	12	13	NCWESC	Pts	Ref
2007	Marsh Racing	31	Chevy	GRE	ELK	IOW	SBO	STA	NHA; 7	TMP; 6	MCM	ADI	LRP; 6	MFD	NHA; 9	DOV	28th	589	
2008	Marsh Racing	31	Chevy	GRE	IOW; 13	SBO	GLN; DNQ	NHA	TMP	MCM	ADI	LRP	MFD	NHA	DOV	STA	46th	200	

==== Camping World West Series ====
NASCAR Camping World West Series results
Year	Team	No.	Make	1	2	3	4	5	6	7	8	9	10	11	12	13	NCWWSC	Pts	Ref
2008	Marsh Racing	31	Chevy	AAS	PHO; 6	CTS	IOW	CNS	SON	IRW	DCS	EVG	MMP	IRW	AMP	AAS	53rd	150	

==== Canadian Tire Series ====
NASCAR Canadian Tire Series results
Year	Team	No.	Make	1	2	3	4	5	6	7	8	9	10	11	12	NCTSC	Pts	Ref
2013	22 Racing	24	Dodge	MOS	DEL	MOS2	ICAR	MPS	SAS	ASE	CTR	RIS	MOS3; 31	BAR	KWA	59th	13	

=== ARCA Racing Series ===
(key) (Bold – Pole position awarded by qualifying time. Italics – Pole position earned by points standings or practice time. * – Most laps led.)

ARCA Racing Series results
Year	Team	No.	Make	1	2	3	4	5	6	7	8	9	10	11	12	13	14	15	16	17	18	19	20	21	22	23	ARSC	Pts	Ref
2007	Country Joe Racing	32	Dodge	DAY	USA; 1	NSH	SLM; 6	KAN	WIN	KEN	TOL	IOW	POC	MCH	BLN; 3	KEN	POC	NSH	ISF; 7	MIL; 28	GTW	DSF	CHI	SLM; 4	TAL	TOL; 2	30th	1405	
2008	Win-Tron Racing	9	Dodge	DAY	SLM	IOW; 29	KAN	CAR	KEN	TOL	POC	MCH															36th	880	
2008	Win-Tron Racing	32	Dodge										CAY; 25	KEN	BLN	POC	NSH; 17	ISF	DSF; 9	CHI; 36	SLM	NJE; 7	**TAL**; 31	TOL			36th	880	
2009	Win-Tron Racing	32	Toyota	DAY; 1*	SLM	CAR	TAL	KEN; 1*	TOL	POC	MCH; 4	MFD															39th	735	
2009	Win-Tron Racing	9	Toyota										IOW; 30	KEN	BLN	POC	ISF	CHI	TOL	DSF	NJE	SLM	KAN	CAR			39th	735	
2010	Phoenix Racing	51	Toyota	**DAY**; 4	PBE	SLM		TAL; 30	TOL	POC	MCH	IOW	MFD	POC	BLN	NJE	ISF	CHI	DSF	TOL	SLM	KAN	CAR				49th	450	
2010	Phoenix Racing	51	Dodge				TEX; 18																				49th	450	
2011	Turner Motorsports	4	Chevy	DAY	TAL	SLM	TOL	NJE	CHI	POC	MCH	WIN	BLN	IOW	IRP; 3	POC	ISF	MAD	DSF	SLM	KAN	TOL					85th	225	

Sporting positions
Preceded by Austin Dillon	NASCAR Camping World Truck Series Champion; 2012	Succeeded by Matt Crafton
