= 2012 DRIVE4COPD 300 =

Race details
- Map of Speedway
- Date: February 25, 2012
- Official name: 2012 DRIVE4COPD 300
- Location: Daytona International Speedway in Daytona Beach, Florida
- Course: Tri-oval
- Course length: 2.5 miles (4.023 km)
- Distance: 120 laps, 300 mi (400 km)
- Weather: Sunny
- Average speed: 129.636 mph (208.629 km/h)
- Attendance: 82,000

Pole position
| Driver | Danica Patrick | JR Motorsports |
- Time: 49.250

Most laps led
| Driver | Kurt Busch | Phoenix Racing |
- Laps: 42

Winner
| No. 30 | James Buescher | Turner Motorsports |

Television in the United States
- Network: ESPN
- Announcers: Allen Bestwick, Dale Jarrett, Andy Petree

The 2012 DRIVE4COPD 300 was a NASCAR Nationwide Series race held on February 25, 2012 at Daytona International Speedway in Daytona Beach, Florida. It was the first race of the 2012 NASCAR Nationwide Series season. The race was the 31st running of the event. Danica Patrick won the pole but in the race's end, a surprise winner happened with James Buescher winning his first and only Nationwide Series race of his entire career in an last lap wreck that took out most of the top 10 cars.

== Entry list ==
- (R) denotes rookie driver
- (i) denotes driver who is ineligible for series driver points

| # | Driver | Team | Make |
|---|---|---|---|
| 01 | Mike Wallace | JD Motorsports | Chevrolet |
| 1 | Kurt Busch (i) | Phoenix Racing | Chevrolet |
| 2 | Elliott Sadler | Richard Childress Racing | Chevrolet |
| 3 | Austin Dillon (R) | Richard Childress Racing | Chevrolet |
| 4 | Danny Efland | JD Motorsports | Chevrolet |
| 5 | Dale Earnhardt Jr. (i) | JR Motorsports | Chevrolet |
| 6 | Ricky Stenhouse Jr. | Roush Fenway Racing | Ford |
| 7 | Danica Patrick | JR Motorsports | Chevrolet |
| 08 | Casey Roderick | Randy Hill Racing | Ford |
| 09 | Kenny Wallace | RAB Racing | Toyota |
| 10 | Jeff Green | TriStar Motorsports | Toyota |
| 11 | Brian Scott | Joe Gibbs Racing | Toyota |
| 12 | Sam Hornish Jr. | Penske Racing | Dodge |
| 14 | Eric McClure | TriStar Motorsports | Toyota |
| 15 | Timmy Hill (i) | Rick Ware Racing | Ford |
| 18 | Denny Hamlin (i) | Joe Gibbs Racing | Toyota |
| 19 | Tayler Malsam | TriStar Motorsports | Toyota |
| 20 | Joey Logano (i) | Joe Gibbs Racing | Toyota |
| 22 | Brad Keselowski (i) | Penske Racing | Dodge |
| 23 | Robert Richardson Jr. | R3 Motorsports | Chevrolet |
| 24 | Benny Gordon (R) | SR² Motorsports | Toyota |
| 27 | David Ragan (i) | GC Motorsports International | Ford |
| 28 | J. J. Yeley (i) | Robinson-Blakeney Racing | Chevrolet |
| 30 | James Buescher (i) | Turner Motorsports | Chevrolet |
| 31 | Justin Allgaier | Turner Motorsports | Chevrolet |
| 33 | Tony Stewart (i) | Richard Childress Racing | Chevrolet |
| 36 | Ryan Truex | Tommy Baldwin Racing | Chevrolet |
| 38 | Kasey Kahne (i) | Turner Motorsports | Chevrolet |
| 39 | Joey Gase (R) | Go Green Racing | Ford |
| 40 | Josh Wise (i) | The Motorsports Group | Chevrolet |
| 41 | Blake Koch | Rick Ware Racing | Ford |
| 42 | Erik Darnell | The Motorsports Group | Chevrolet |
| 43 | Michael Annett | Richard Petty Motorsports | Ford |
| 44 | Mike Bliss | TriStar Motorsports | Toyota |
| 46 | Chase Miller | The Motorsports Group | Chevrolet |
| 47 | Scott Speed (i) | The Motorsports Group | Chevrolet |
| 50 | T. J. Bell | MAKE Motorsports | Chevrolet |
| 51 | Jeremy Clements | Jeremy Clements Racing | Chevrolet |
| 52 | Reed Sorenson | Hamilton Means Racing | Chevrolet |
| 54 | Kyle Busch (i) | Kyle Busch Motorsports | Toyota |
| 60 | Trevor Bayne | Roush Fenway Racing | Ford |
| 70 | Johanna Long (R) | ML Motorsports | Chevrolet |
| 73 | Derrike Cope | CFK Motorsports | Chevrolet |
| 74 | Mike Harmon | Mike Harmon Racing | Chevrolet |
| 76 | Donnie Neuenberger | Ray Hackett Racing | Ford |
| 81 | Jason Bowles (R) | MacDonald Motorsports | Dodge |
| 87 | Joe Nemechek | NEMCO Motorsports | Toyota |
| 88 | Cole Whitt (R) | JR Motorsports | Chevrolet |
| 89 | Morgan Shepherd | Shepherd Racing Ventures | Chevrolet |
| 97 | Johnny Sauter (i) | NEMCO Motorsports | Toyota |
Official Entry List

== Qualifying ==
Danica Patrick won the pole for the race. Her time was 49.250 with a speed of 182.741 mph.

| Grid | No. | Driver | Team | Manufacturer | Time | Speed |
|---|---|---|---|---|---|---|
| 1 | 7 | Danica Patrick | JR Motorsports | Chevrolet | 49.250 | 182.741 |
| 2 | 60 | Trevor Bayne | Roush Fenway Racing | Ford | 49.257 | 182.715 |
| 3 | 2 | Elliott Sadler | Richard Childress Racing | Chevrolet | 49.269 | 182.671 |
| 4 | 5 | Dale Earnhardt Jr. (i) | JR Motorsports | Chevrolet | 49.290 | 182.593 |
| 5 | 3 | Austin Dillon (R) | Richard Childress Racing | Chevrolet | 49.339 | 182.411 |
| 6 | 12 | Sam Hornish Jr. | Penske Racing | Dodge | 49.367 | 182.308 |
| 7 | 33 | Tony Stewart (i) | Richard Childress Racing | Chevrolet | 49.383 | 182.249 |
| 8 | 88 | Cole Whitt (R) | JR Motorsports | Chevrolet | 49.421 | 182.109 |
| 9 | 22 | Brad Keselowski (i) | Penske Racing | Dodge | 49.425 | 182.094 |
| 10 | 6 | Ricky Stenhouse Jr. | Roush Fenway Racing | Ford | 49.497 | 181.829 |
| 11 | 38 | Kasey Kahne (i) | Turner Motorsports | Chevrolet | 49.550 | 181.635 |
| 12 | 31 | Justin Allgaier | Turner Motorsports | Chevrolet | 49.588 | 181.496 |
| 13 | 44 | Mike Bliss | TriStar Motorsports | Toyota | 49.606 | 181.430 |
| 14 | 1 | Kurt Busch | Phoenix Racing | Chevrolet | 49.634 | 181.327 |
| 15 | 30 | James Buescher (i) | Turner Motorsports | Chevrolet | 49.669 | 181.200 |
| 16 | 43 | Michael Annett | Richard Petty Motorsports | Ford | 49.708 | 181.057 |
| 17 | 18 | Denny Hamlin (i) | Joe Gibbs Racing | Toyota | 49.733 | 180.966 |
| 18 | 36 | Ryan Truex | Tommy Baldwin Racing | Chevrolet | 49.743 | 180.930 |
| 19 | 11 | Brian Scott | Joe Gibbs Racing | Toyota | 49.755 | 180.886 |
| 20 | 14 | Eric McClure | TriStar Motorsports | Toyota | 49.796 | 180.737 |
| 21 | 70 | Johanna Long (R) | ML Motorsports | Chevrolet | 49.831 | 180.610 |
| 22 | 20 | Joey Logano (i) | Joe Gibbs Racing | Toyota | 49.840 | 180.578 |
| 23 | 27 | David Ragan (i)* | GC Motorsports International | Ford | 49.908 | 180.332 |
| 24 | 54 | Kyle Busch (i) | Kyle Busch Motorsports | Toyota | 50.023 | 179.917 |
| 25 | 19 | Tayler Malsam | TriStar Motorsports | Toyota | 50.096 | 179.655 |
| 26 | 09 | Kenny Wallace | RAB Racing | Toyota | 50.113 | 179.594 |
| 27 | 87 | Joe Nemechek | NEMCO Motorsports | Toyota | 50.209 | 179.251 |
| 28 | 01 | Mike Wallace | JD Motorsports | Chevrolet | 50.259 | 179.072 |
| 29 | 15 | Timmy Hill (i) | Rick Ware Racing | Ford | 50.331 | 178.816 |
| 30 | 97 | Johnny Sauter (i)* | NEMCO Motorsports | Toyota | 50.374 | 178.664 |
| 31 | 41 | Blake Koch | Rick Ware Racing | Ford | 50.420 | 178.501 |
| 32 | 08 | Casey Roderick | Randy Hill Racing | Ford | 50.532 | 178.105 |
| 33 | 24 | Benny Gordon (R) | SR² Motorsports | Toyota | 50.539 | 178.080 |
| 34 | 23 | Robert Richardson Jr. | R3 Motorsports | Chevrolet | 50.559 | 178.010 |
| 35 | 39 | Joey Gase (R) | Go Green Racing | Ford | 50.664 | 177.641 |
| 36 | 51 | Jeremy Clements | Jeremy Clements Racing | Chevrolet | 50.780 | 177.235 |
| 37 | 40 | Josh Wise (i) | The Motorsports Group | Chevrolet | 50.793 | 177.190 |
| 38 | 28 | J. J. Yeley (i)* | Robinson-Blakeney Racing | Chevrolet | 50.819 | 177.099 |
| 39 | 50 | T. J. Bell | MAKE Motorsports | Chevrolet | 50.867 | 176.932 |
| 40 | 81 | Jason Bowels (R)** | MacDonald Motorsports | Dodge | 50.891 | 176.849 |
| 41 | 4 | Danny Efland** | JD Motorsports | Chevrolet | 51.016 | 176.415 |
| 42 | 52 | Reed Sorenson** | Hamilton Means Racing | Chevrolet | 51.286 | 175.486 |
| 43 | 10 | Jeff Green | TriStar Motorsports | Toyota | 50.853 | 176.981 |
Failed to Qualify, withdrew, or driver changes
| 44 | 89 | Morgan Shepherd | Shepherd Racing Ventures | Chevrolet | 50.616 | 177.809 |
| 45 | 73 | Derrike Cope | CFK Motorsports | Chevrolet | 50.818 | 177.103 |
| 46 | 42 | Erik Darnell | The Motorsports Group | Chevrolet | 50.857 | 176.967 |
| 47 | 47 | Scott Speed (i) | The Motorsports Group | Chevrolet | 51.076 | 176.208 |
| 48 | 74 | Mike Harmon | Mike Harmon Racing | Chevrolet | 51.166 | 175.898 |
| 49 | 46 | Chase Miller | The Motorsports Group | Chevrolet | 51.428 | 175.002 |
| 50 | 76 | Donnie Neuenberger | Ray Hackett Racing | Ford | 51.801 | 173.742 |
Official Qualifying results

* – David Ragan, J. J. Yeley, and Johnny Sauter all had to start at the rear of the field. Ragan and Yeley missed the drivers meeting while Sauter had adjustments outside impound.

** – Jason Bowels, Danny Efland, and Reed Sorenson qualified in 44th, 45th, and 48th but all 3 still made the field via owners points.

== Race ==
Pole sitter Danica Patrick led the first lap of the race with a push by her boss at JR Motorsports in Dale Earnhardt Jr. Patrick lost the lead on lap 3 to Trevor Bayne as Bayne got a push by Elliott Sadler. Bayne gave up the lead on the next lap to Sadler as the two swapped spots to prevent Sadler's car from overheating. Tony Stewart, who has won 6 of the last 7 DRIVE4COPD 300 races at Daytona, took the lead from Sadler and Bayne. Kasey Kahne took the lead from Stewart on lap 9. On lap 13, Denny Hamlin took the lead from Kahne. Bayne and Sadler took the lead back on lap 14 of the race. Sam Hornish Jr. took the lead from Bayne on lap 16 with a push from his teammate in Brad Keselowski. On lap 21, Mike Bliss took the lead from the Penske cars. On lap 26, Dale Earnhardt Jr. took the lead with a push by Kurt Busch but Bliss took it back on the next lap when Jr. and Busch swapped. On the next lap, Kurt Busch took the lead with Jr. helping him. On lap 30, the first caution of the race flew when rookie Jason Bowels' engine blew laying fluid on the racetrack. Kurt Busch won the race off of pit road and he was the race leader. The race restarted on lap 36. On lap 37, Tony Stewart battled for the lead with Busch and Stewart led lap 37 before he took full control on lap 38. On lap 44, Kurt Busch took the lead when Stewart and his draft partner Joey Logano swapped spots. On lap 45, a close call occurred when J. J. Yeley's engine let go in the middle of the pack. Yeley was able to get his car to the apron unscathed and no caution was flown. On lap 49, Dale Earnhardt Jr. took the lead. On the same lap, the second caution flew when Danica Patrick got turned by Cole Whitt in turn 3 and hit the outside wall. Patrick complained on her radio about Whitt being too aggressive on the push even dropping f-bombs. During the pitstops, Kyle Busch came out of his pit box while Cole Whitt was coming to his and the 2 made contact turning Whitt around. No one was hurt and Whitt made his pitstop facing the right way. Denny Hamlin won the race off of pit road making him the race leader. The race restarted on lap 54 and Kurt Busch took the lead from Hamlin. On lap 60, the third caution flew when Mike Bliss got turned by Joe Nemechek in the backstretch. Some drivers pitted while others stayed out and Elliott Sadler was the race leader. The race restarted with 56 laps to go and Dale Earnhardt Jr. took the lead from Sadler. But Sadler took it back on the same lap. With 54 to go, Dale Earnhardt Jr. beat Sadler to the line and led the lap before Sadler took it back with 53 to go. With 48 to go and after being in the back all day, Kyle Busch took the lead. On the next lap, Kyle's brother Kurt took the lead from his brother. On the same lap, the 4th caution flew when Brian Scott got turned by Michael Annett and Scott turned into James Buescher and hit the outside wall. Joe Nemechek won the race off of pit road which made him the race leader. The race restarted with 41 laps to go and Sam Hornish Jr. took the lead. With 39 to go, Kurt Busch took the lead from Sam Hornish Jr. with his brother Kyle helping him. With 38 laps to go, Tony Stewart took the lead from the Busch brothers. Kyle took the lead from Stewart with 32 to go. Denny Hamlin took the lead from his Cup Series teammate with 31 laps to go. Dale Earnhardt Jr. took the lead from Hamlin on the next lap.

=== Final laps ===
With 29 laps to go, Tony Stewart took the lead from Hamlin. With 27 laps to go, the 5th caution flew when Joey Gase's engine blew and he laid fluid on the race track. Denny Hamlin won the race off of pit road but Timmy Hill, Kenny Wallace, Justin Allgaier, Robert Richardson Jr., Blake Koch, and David Ragan did not pit and Hill was the race leader. The race restarted with 22 laps to go. Kenny Wallace took the lead from Hill and led. But both Wallace and Robert Richardson Jr. quickly got split by Denny Hamlin and Tony Stewart with 21 to go and fell back. Hamlin took the lead with 21 to go. With 19 to go, Brian Scott got loose and hit the outside wall in turns 1 and 2 but no caution was thrown. On the same lap, Tony Stewart took the lead. With 17 laps to go, the first big one struck out of turn 4 taking out 19 cars. James Buescher made contact with Trevor Bayne sending Bayne up into Kasey Kahne. Cars checked up and Justin Allgaier got turned by Kenny Wallace and the 2 hit the outside wall taking more cars. The cars involved were Justin Allgaier, Kenny Wallace, Mike Wallace, Michael Annett, Jeremy Clements, Casey Roderick, Tayler Malsam, T. J. Bell, Robert Richardson Jr., Johanna Long, Danny Efland, Denny Hamlin, Josh Wise, James Buescher, Benny Gordon, Reed Sorenson, Ryan Truex, Joe Nemechek, and Austin Dillon. The race was red flagged for only a few minutes to clean up the mess. Kurt Busch led the field with 8 laps to go. But on the next lap, the second big one occurred out of turn 4 taking out 14 cars. Sam Hornish Jr. got turned by David Ragan and collected Ragan, Timmy Hill, Joe Nemechek, Danny Efland, Blake Koch, Johanna Long, Michael Annett, Mike Wallace, Dale Earnhardt Jr., Joey Logano, Kasey Kahne, Eric McClure, and Cole Whitt. The wreck set up a 2 lap shootout. On the restart, Kurt Busch took the lead with brother Kyle pushing him. A total of 15 cars were set up in a pack and it also set up for a fantastic final lap. On the final lap, a tandem of Joey Logano and Trevor Bayne began to close in on the Busch brother tandem and the 4 cars broke away from the pack. Out of turn 2, Logano and Bayne attempted to pass the Busch brothers low but the Busch brothers blocked them and the Logano–Bayne tandem moved back to the outside. From this point on, chaos ensued. The Logano–Bayne tandem had a run to the outside and the Busch brother tandem got broke. Despite with no help from his brother Kyle at this point, Kurt attempted to keep climbing up into Logano in an attempt to break Logano's momentum. But little did they know in turns 3 and 4, a tandem of Tony Stewart and Elliott Sadler had a huge run on the cars and the Stewart–Sadler tandem peaked to the outside of the Logano–Bayne tandem. From here, a 12 car crash occurred. Kurt squeezed Logano, Bayne, and Stewart into the outside wall and Bayne turned Kurt into Logano. Logano spun while Kurt, Bayne, Stewart, and Sadler were squeezed into the outside wall. Five other cars behind the wrecking race cars in Kyle Busch, Ricky Stenhouse Jr., Cole Whitt, Kasey Kahne, and Brad Keselowski went low to avoid and looked like it was gonna be a battle between those 5. Unfortunately, Stenhouse hooked Kyle Busch and Kurt Busch came down and collected Stenhouse, Whitt, Kahne, and Keselowski. The wreck also collected Brian Scott and Blake Koch. Meanwhile, NASCAR has yet to throw a caution while they were waiting for a car to come out of the wreck. One car came out of the wreck in the lead and NASCAR threw the 8th and final caution of the race. That car that came out of the wreck in first place was James Buescher, who was in 11th when the wreck occurred, and Buescher took the checkered flag. Brad Keselowski, however, made it out of the wreck first and was in the lead but his car ended up getting loose and was going all over the place trying to avoid the wreck and save it which made him lose momentum when Buescher passed him before the caution came out and ended up finishing in 2nd. Only Kyle Busch and Ricky Stenhouse Jr. failed to finish the race. This would be Buescher's first and only win of his NASCAR Nationwide Series career. Elliott Sadler, Cole Whitt, and Austin Dillon rounded out the top 5 while Tayler Malsam, Timmy Hill, Tony Stewart, Kasey Kahne, and Kurt Busch rounded out the top 10.

== Race results ==
| Pos | Car | Driver | Team | Manufacturer | Laps Run | Laps Led | Status | Points |
|---|---|---|---|---|---|---|---|---|
| 1 | 30 | James Buescher (i) | Turner Motorsports | Chevrolet | 120 | 1 | running | 0 |
| 2 | 22 | Brad Keselowski (i) | Penske Racing | Dodge | 120 | 0 | running | 0 |
| 3 | 2 | Elliott Sadler | Richard Childress Racing | Chevrolet | 120 | 8 | running | 42 |
| 4 | 88 | Cole Whitt (R) | JR Motorsports | Chevrolet | 120 | 0 | running | 40 |
| 5 | 3 | Austin Dillon (R) | Richard Childress Racing | Chevrolet | 120 | 0 | running | 39 |
| 6 | 19 | Tayler Malsam | TriStar Motorsports | Toyota | 120 | 0 | running | 38 |
| 7 | 15 | Timmy Hill (i) | Rick Ware Racing | Ford | 120 | 4 | running | 0 |
| 8 | 33 | Tony Stewart (i) | Richard Childress Racing | Chevrolet | 120 | 22 | running | 0 |
| 9 | 38 | Kasey Kahne (i) | Turner Motorsports | Chevrolet | 120 | 4 | running | 0 |
| 10 | 1 | Kurt Busch (i) | Phoenix Racing | Chevrolet | 120 | 42 | running | 0 |
| 11 | 60 | Trevor Bayne | Roush Fenway Racing | Ford | 120 | 3 | running | 34 |
| 12 | 24 | Benny Gordon (R) | SR² Motorsports | Toyota | 120 | 0 | running | 32 |
| 13 | 4 | Danny Efland | JD Motorsports | Chevrolet | 120 | 0 | running | 31 |
| 14 | 40 | Josh Wise (i) | The Motorsports Group | Chevrolet | 120 | 0 | running | 0 |
| 15 | 5 | Dale Earnhardt Jr. (i) | JR Motorsports | Chevrolet | 120 | 8 | running | 0 |
| 16 | 20 | Joey Logano (i) | Joe Gibbs Racing | Toyota | 120 | 0 | running | 0 |
| 17 | 41 | Blake Koch | Rick Ware Racing | Ford | 120 | 0 | running | 27 |
| 18 | 54 | Kyle Busch (i) | Kyle Busch Motorsports | Toyota | 119 | 2 | crash | 0 |
| 19 | 6 | Ricky Stenhouse Jr. | Roush Fenway Racing | Ford | 119 | 0 | crash | 25 |
| 20 | 12 | Sam Hornish Jr. | Penske Racing | Dodge | 119 | 7 | running | 25 |
| 21 | 70 | Johanna Long (R) | ML Motorsports | Chevrolet | 119 | 0 | running | 23 |
| 22 | 14 | Eric McClure | TriStar Motorsports | Toyota | 118 | 0 | running | 22 |
| 23 | 87 | Joe Nemechek | NEMCO Motorsports | Toyota | 116 | 2 | crash | 22 |
| 24 | 50 | T. J. Bell | MAKE Motorsports | Chevrolet | 115 | 0 | crash | 20 |
| 25 | 51 | Jeremy Clements | Jeremy Clements Racing | Chevrolet | 115 | 0 | running | 19 |
| 26 | 27 | David Ragan (i) | GC Motorsports International | Ford | 113 | 0 | crash | 0 |
| 27 | 43 | Michael Annett | Richard Petty Motorsports | Ford | 113 | 0 | crash | 17 |
| 28 | 01 | Mike Wallace | JD Motorsports | Chevrolet | 112 | 0 | running | 16 |
| 29 | 39 | Joey Gase (R) | Go Green Racing | Ford | 108 | 0 | running | 15 |
| 30 | 09 | Kenny Wallace | RAB Racing | Toyota | 104 | 1 | crash | 15 |
| 31 | 36 | Ryan Truex | Tommy Baldwin Racing | Chevrolet | 104 | 0 | crash | 13 |
| 32 | 18 | Denny Hamlin (i) | Joe Gibbs Racing | Toyota | 103 | 7 | crash | 0 |
| 33 | 31 | Justin Allgaier | Turner Motorsports | Chevrolet | 103 | 0 | crash | 11 |
| 34 | 52 | Reed Sorenson | Hamilton Means Racing | Chevrolet | 103 | 0 | crash | 10 |
| 35 | 23 | Robert Richardson Jr. | R3 Motorsports | Chevrolet | 103 | 1 | crash | 10 |
| 36 | 08 | Casey Roderick | Randy Hill Racing | Ford | 103 | 0 | crash | 8 |
| 37 | 11 | Brian Scott | Joe Gibbs Racing | Toyota | 96 | 0 | running | 7 |
| 38 | 7 | Danica Patrick | JR Motorsports | Chevrolet | 72 | 2 | running | 7 |
| 39 | 44 | Mike Bliss | TriStar Motorsports | Toyota | 59 | 6 | crash | 6 |
| 40 | 28 | J. J. Yeley (i) | Robinson-Blakeney Racing | Chevrolet | 43 | 0 | engine | 0 |
| 41 | 81 | Jason Bowels (R) | MacDonald Motorsports | Dodge | 28 | 0 | engine | 3 |
| 42 | 97 | Johnny Sauter (i) | NEMCO Motorsports | Toyota | 14 | 0 | electrical | 0 |
| 43 | 10 | Jeff Green | TriStar Motorsports | Toyota | 3 | 0 | vibration | 1 |
Official Race results

| Previous race: 2011 Ford 300 | NASCAR Nationwide Series; 2012 season | Next race: 2012 Bashas' Supermarkets 200 |
