= 2014 O'Reilly Auto Parts 300 =

Sixth race of the 2014 NASCAR Nationwide Series

Race details
- Race 6 of 33 of the 2014 NASCAR Nationwide Series
- Date: April 4, 2014
- Official name: 18th Annual O'Reilly Auto Parts 300
- Location: Fort Worth, Texas, Texas Motor Speedway
- Course: Permanent racing facility
- Course length: 1.5 miles (2.41 km)
- Distance: 200 laps, 300 mi (482.803 km)
- Scheduled distance: 200 laps, 300 mi (482.803 km)
- Average speed: 137.545 miles per hour (221.357 km/h)

Pole position
Driver	Kevin Harvick	JR Motorsports
- Time: 29.195

Most laps led
Driver	Kevin Harvick	JR Motorsports
- Laps: 101

Winner
No. 9	Chase Elliott	Kevin Harvick

Television in the United States
- Network: ESPN2
- Announcers: Allen Bestwick, Rusty Wallace, Andy Petree

Radio in the United States
- Radio: Performance Racing Network

The 2014 O'Reilly Auto Parts 300 was the sixth stock car race of the 2014 NASCAR Nationwide Series season, and the 18th iteration of the event. The race was held on Friday, April 4, 2014, in Fort Worth, Texas at Texas Motor Speedway, a 1.5 miles (2.4 km) permanent tri-oval shaped racetrack. The race took the scheduled 200 laps to complete. In the closing laps of the race, JR Motorsports driver Chase Elliott would manage to pull away from the field to win his first career NASCAR Nationwide Series victory and his first of the season. To fill out the podium, Kyle Busch, driving for Joe Gibbs Racing, and Kyle Larson, driving for Turner Scott Motorsports, would finish second and third, respectively.

== Background ==
Texas Motor Speedway is a speedway located in the northernmost portion of the U.S. city of Fort Worth, Texas – the portion located in Denton County, Texas. The track measures 1.5 miles (2.4 km) around and is banked 24 degrees in the turns, and is of the oval design, where the front straightaway juts outward slightly. The track layout is similar to Atlanta Motor Speedway and Charlotte Motor Speedway (formerly Lowe's Motor Speedway). The track is owned by Speedway Motorsports, Inc., the same company that owns Atlanta and Charlotte Motor Speedway, as well as the short-track Bristol Motor Speedway.

=== Entry list ===
- (R) denotes rookie driver.
- (i) denotes driver who is ineligible for series driver points.

#	Driver	Team	Make	Sponsor
01	Landon Cassill	JD Motorsports	Chevrolet	G&K Services
2	Brian Scott	Richard Childress Racing	Chevrolet	Shore Lodge
3	Ty Dillon (R)	Richard Childress Racing	Chevrolet	WESCO
4	Jeffrey Earnhardt	JD Motorsports	Chevrolet	Flex Seal
5	Kevin Harvick (i)	JR Motorsports	Chevrolet	Hunt Brothers Pizza
6	Trevor Bayne	Roush Fenway Racing	Ford	AdvoCare
7	Regan Smith	JR Motorsports	Chevrolet	TaxSlayer
9	Chase Elliott (R)	JR Motorsports	Chevrolet	NAPA Auto Parts
10	Blake Koch	TriStar Motorsports	Toyota	SupportMilitary.org
11	Elliott Sadler	Joe Gibbs Racing	Toyota	OneMain Financial
13	Mike Wallace	MBM Motorsports	Toyota	Headrush
14	Eric McClure	TriStar Motorsports	Toyota	Hefty Ultimate
16	Ryan Reed (R)	Roush Fenway Racing	Ford	Lilly Diabetes
17	Tanner Berryhill (R)	Vision Racing	Dodge	BWP Bats
19	Mike Bliss	TriStar Motorsports	Toyota	SupportMilitary.org
20	Matt Kenseth (i)	Joe Gibbs Racing	Toyota	GameStop, Lego The Hobbit
22	Ryan Blaney (i)	Team Penske	Ford	Discount Tire
23	Robert Richardson Jr.	R3 Motorsports	Chevrolet	Willbros Group
28	Derek White (i)	JGL Racing	Dodge	Headrush
31	Dylan Kwasniewski (R)	Turner Scott Motorsports	Chevrolet	Rockstar, AccuDoc Solutions
39	Ryan Sieg (R)	RSS Racing	Chevrolet	Pull-A-Part
40	Josh Wise (i)	The Motorsports Group	Chevrolet	The Motorsports Group
42	Kyle Larson (i)	Turner Scott Motorsports	Chevrolet	Cartwheel by Target
43	Dakoda Armstrong (R)	Richard Petty Motorsports	Ford	WinField United
44	David Starr	TriStar Motorsports	Toyota	Whataburger
46	Matt DiBenedetto	The Motorsports Group	Chevrolet	The Motorsports Group
51	Jeremy Clements	Jeremy Clements Racing	Chevrolet	RepairableVehicles.com, Value Lighting
52	Joey Gase	Jimmy Means Racing	Chevrolet	Better Business Bureau
54	Kyle Busch (i)	Joe Gibbs Racing	Toyota	Monster Energy
55	Jamie Dick	Viva Motorsports	Chevrolet	Viva Motorsports
60	Chris Buescher (R)	Roush Fenway Racing	Ford	Roush Performance
62	Brendan Gaughan	Richard Childress Racing	Chevrolet	South Point Hotel, Casino & Spa
70	Derrike Cope	Derrike Cope Racing	Chevrolet	Youtheory
74	Mike Harmon	Mike Harmon Racing	Dodge	Mike Harmon Racing
76	Tommy Joe Martins (R)	Martins Motorsports	Dodge	Martins Motorsports
84	Chad Boat (R)	Billy Boat Motorsports	Chevrolet	RedFest Music Festival
87	Kevin Lepage	JD Motorsports	Chevrolet	JD Motorsports
88	Dale Earnhardt Jr. (i)	JR Motorsports	Chevrolet	Ragú
93	J. J. Yeley	JGL Racing	Dodge	JGL Racing
99	James Buescher	RAB Racing	Toyota	Rheem
Official entry list

== Practice ==
=== First practice ===
The first practice session was held on Thursday, April 3, at 5:00 PM CST. The session would last for one hour. Ty Dillon, driving for Richard Childress Racing, would set the fastest time in the session, with a lap of 29.916 and an average speed of 180.505 miles per hour (290.495 km/h).

Pos.	#	Driver	Team	Make	Time	Speed
1	3	Ty Dillon (R)	Richard Childress Racing	Chevrolet	29.916	180.505
2	54	Kyle Busch (i)	Joe Gibbs Racing	Toyota	29.969	180.186
3	6	Trevor Bayne	Roush Fenway Racing	Ford	30.058	179.653
Full first practice results

=== Final practice ===
The final practice session, sometimes referred to as Happy Hour, was held on Thursday, April 3, at 6:30 PM CST. The session would last for one hour and 30 minutes. Ty Dillon, driving for Richard Childress Racing, would set the fastest time in the session, with a lap of 29.940 and an average speed of 180.361 miles per hour (290.263 km/h).

Pos.	#	Driver	Team	Make	Time	Speed
1	3	Ty Dillon (R)	Richard Childress Racing	Chevrolet	29.940	180.361
2	7	Regan Smith	JR Motorsports	Chevrolet	30.025	179.850
3	60	Chris Buescher (R)	Roush Fenway Racing	Ford	30.053	179.683
Full Happy Hour practice results

== Qualifying ==
Qualifying was held on Friday, April 4, at 3:10 PM CST. Since Texas Motor Speedway is at least 1.25 miles (2.01 km) in length, the qualifying system was a multi-car system that included three rounds. The first round was 25 minutes, where every driver would be able to set a lap within the 25 minutes. Then, the second round would consist of the fastest 24 cars in Round 1, and drivers would have 10 minutes to set a lap. Round 3 consisted of the fastest 12 drivers from Round 2, and the drivers would have 5 minutes to set a time. Whoever was fastest in Round 3 would win the pole.

Kevin Harvick, driving for JR Motorsports, would win the pole after setting a time of 29.195 and an average speed of 184.963 mph (297.669 km/h) in the third round.

=== Full qualifying results ===
Pos.	#	Driver	Team	Make	Time (R1)	Speed (R1)	Time (R2)	Speed (R2)	Time (R3)	Speed (R3)
1	5	Kevin Harvick (i)	JR Motorsports	Chevrolet	-*	-*	-*	-*	29.195	184.963
2	20	Matt Kenseth (i)	Joe Gibbs Racing	Toyota	-*	-*	-*	-*	29.274	184.464
3	7	Regan Smith	JR Motorsports	Chevrolet	-*	-*	-*	-*	29.295	184.332
4	88	Dale Earnhardt Jr. (i)	JR Motorsports	Chevrolet	-*	-*	-*	-*	29.301	184.294
5	11	Elliott Sadler	Joe Gibbs Racing	Toyota	-*	-*	-*	-*	29.305	184.269
6	9	Chase Elliott (R)	JR Motorsports	Chevrolet	-*	-*	-*	-*	29.309	184.244
7	62	Brendan Gaughan	Richard Childress Racing	Chevrolet	-*	-*	-*	-*	29.334	184.087
8	6	Trevor Bayne	Roush Fenway Racing	Ford	-*	-*	-*	-*	29.365	183.892
9	22	Ryan Blaney (i)	Team Penske	Ford	-*	-*	-*	-*	29.368	183.874
10	31	Dylan Kwasniewski (R)	Turner Scott Motorsports	Chevrolet	-*	-*	-*	-*	29.505	183.020
11	99	James Buescher	RAB Racing	Toyota	-*	-*	-*	-*	29.757	181.470
12	44	David Starr	TriStar Motorsports	Toyota	-*	-*	-*	-*	29.811	181.141
Eliminated in Round 2
13	2	Brian Scott	Richard Childress Racing	Chevrolet	-*	-*	29.534	182.840	-	-
14	84	Chad Boat (R)	Billy Boat Motorsports	Chevrolet	-*	-*	29.654	182.100	-	-
15	19	Mike Bliss	TriStar Motorsports	Toyota	-*	-*	29.673	181.984	-	-
16	16	Ryan Reed (R)	Roush Fenway Racing	Ford	-*	-*	29.807	181.165	-	-
17	93	J. J. Yeley	JGL Racing	Dodge	-*	-*	29.841	180.959	-	-
18	51	Jeremy Clements	Jeremy Clements Racing	Chevrolet	-*	-*	29.885	180.693	-	-
19	01	Landon Cassill	JD Motorsports	Chevrolet	-*	-*	29.888	180.675	-	-
20	40	Josh Wise (i)	The Motorsports Group	Chevrolet	-*	-*	30.032	179.808	-	-
21	39	Ryan Sieg (R)	RSS Racing	Chevrolet	-*	-*	30.090	179.462	-	-
22	76	Tommy Joe Martins (R)	Martins Motorsports	Dodge	-*	-*	30.256	178.477	-	-
23	4	Jeffrey Earnhardt	JD Motorsports	Chevrolet	-*	-*	30.296	178.241	-	-
24	87	Kevin Lepage	JD Motorsports	Chevrolet	29.967	180.198	-	-	-	-
Eliminated in Round 1
25	43	Dakoda Armstrong (R)	Richard Petty Motorsports	Ford	30.177	178.944	-	-	-	-
26	55	Jamie Dick	Viva Motorsports	Chevrolet	30.240	178.571	-	-	-	-
27	52	Joey Gase	Jimmy Means Racing	Chevrolet	30.341	177.977	-	-	-	-
28	46	Matt DiBenedetto	The Motorsports Group	Chevrolet	30.385	177.719	-	-	-	-
29	14	Eric McClure	TriStar Motorsports	Toyota	30.421	177.509	-	-	-	-
30	17	Tanner Berryhill (R)	Vision Racing	Dodge	30.550	176.759	-	-	-	-
31	23	Robert Richardson Jr.	R3 Motorsports	Chevrolet	30.836	175.120	-	-	-	-
32	13	Mike Wallace	MBM Motorsports	Toyota	30.856	175.006	-	-	-	-
33	74	Mike Harmon	Mike Harmon Racing	Dodge	31.485	171.510	-	-	-	-
34	70	Derrike Cope	Derrike Cope Racing	Chevrolet	31.503	171.412	-	-	-	-
35	28	Derek White (i)	JGL Racing	Dodge	32.285	167.260	-	-	-	-
36	54	Kyle Busch (i)	Joe Gibbs Racing	Toyota	-	-	-	-	-	-
37	42	Kyle Larson (i)	Turner Scott Motorsports	Chevrolet	-	-	-	-	-	-
38	3	Ty Dillon (R)	Richard Childress Racing	Chevrolet	-	-	-	-	-	-
Qualified by owner's points
39	60	Chris Buescher (R)	Roush Fenway Racing	Ford	-	-	-	-	-	-
Last car to qualify on time
40	10	Blake Koch	TriStar Motorsports	Toyota	31.592	170.929	-	-	-	-
Official qualifying results

*Time not available.

== Race results ==
Fin	St	#	Driver	Team	Make	Laps	Led	Status	Pts	Winnings
1	6	9	Chase Elliott (R)	JR Motorsports	Chevrolet	200	38	running	47	$72,094
2	36	54	Kyle Busch (i)	Joe Gibbs Racing	Toyota	200	38	running	0	$50,375
3	37	42	Kyle Larson (i)	Turner Scott Motorsports	Chevrolet	200	1	running	0	$40,875
4	1	5	Kevin Harvick (i)	JR Motorsports	Chevrolet	200	101	running	0	$41,275
5	4	88	Dale Earnhardt Jr. (i)	JR Motorsports	Chevrolet	200	15	running	0	$29,200
6	2	20	Matt Kenseth (i)	Joe Gibbs Racing	Toyota	200	1	running	0	$26,025
7	3	7	Regan Smith	JR Motorsports	Chevrolet	200	0	running	37	$30,903
8	9	22	Ryan Blaney (i)	Team Penske	Ford	200	0	running	0	$28,928
9	38	3	Ty Dillon (R)	Richard Childress Racing	Chevrolet	200	0	running	35	$28,238
10	5	11	Elliott Sadler	Joe Gibbs Racing	Toyota	200	0	running	34	$28,328
11	7	62	Brendan Gaughan	Richard Childress Racing	Chevrolet	200	0	running	33	$27,628
12	13	2	Brian Scott	Richard Childress Racing	Chevrolet	200	0	running	32	$27,128
13	11	99	James Buescher	RAB Racing	Toyota	200	0	running	31	$26,878
14	10	31	Dylan Kwasniewski (R)	Turner Scott Motorsports	Chevrolet	200	0	running	30	$26,518
15	12	44	David Starr	TriStar Motorsports	Toyota	199	2	running	30	$26,608
16	17	93	J. J. Yeley	JGL Racing	Dodge	199	2	running	29	$26,198
17	21	39	Ryan Sieg (R)	RSS Racing	Chevrolet	199	2	running	28	$25,688
18	18	51	Jeremy Clements	Jeremy Clements Racing	Chevrolet	198	0	running	26	$25,303
19	23	4	Jeffrey Earnhardt	JD Motorsports	Chevrolet	198	0	running	25	$25,168
20	16	16	Ryan Reed (R)	Roush Fenway Racing	Ford	196	0	running	24	$25,558
21	20	40	Josh Wise (i)	The Motorsports Group	Chevrolet	195	0	running	0	$24,948
22	25	43	Dakoda Armstrong (R)	Richard Petty Motorsports	Ford	195	0	running	22	$24,833
23	8	6	Trevor Bayne	Roush Fenway Racing	Ford	195	0	running	21	$24,648
24	29	14	Eric McClure	TriStar Motorsports	Toyota	194	0	running	20	$24,538
25	24	87	Kevin Lepage	JD Motorsports	Chevrolet	194	0	running	19	$24,753
26	27	52	Joey Gase	Jimmy Means Racing	Chevrolet	191	0	running	18	$24,293
27	39	60	Chris Buescher (R)	Roush Fenway Racing	Ford	167	0	crash	17	$24,183
28	26	55	Jamie Dick	Viva Motorsports	Chevrolet	164	0	crash	16	$24,063
29	33	74	Mike Harmon	Mike Harmon Racing	Dodge	131	0	suspension	15	$23,888
30	30	17	Tanner Berryhill (R)	Vision Racing	Dodge	120	0	wheel	14	$24,078
31	14	84	Chad Boat (R)	Billy Boat Motorsports	Chevrolet	119	0	crash	13	$23,648
32	15	19	Mike Bliss	TriStar Motorsports	Toyota	119	0	running	12	$23,538
33	19	01	Landon Cassill	JD Motorsports	Chevrolet	66	0	vibration	11	$16,995
34	31	23	Robert Richardson Jr.	R3 Motorsports	Chevrolet	52	0	crash	10	$23,312
35	22	76	Tommy Joe Martins (R)	Martins Motorsports	Dodge	34	0	brakes	9	$16,755
36	35	28	Derek White (i)	JGL Racing	Dodge	29	0	transmission	0	$15,195
37	32	13	Mike Wallace	MBM Motorsports	Toyota	23	0	electrical	7	$15,075
38	34	70	Derrike Cope	Derrike Cope Racing	Chevrolet	6	0	engine	6	$15,040
39	28	46	Matt DiBenedetto	The Motorsports Group	Chevrolet	5	0	vibration	5	$14,790
40	40	10	Blake Koch	TriStar Motorsports	Toyota	2	0	vibration	4	$14,755
Official race results

== Standings after the race ==
Drivers' Championship standings

	Pos	Driver	Points
3	1	Chase Elliott	224
1	2	Regan Smith	222 (-2)
	3	Ty Dillon	214 (-10)
1	4	Elliott Sadler	208 (–16)
3	5	Trevor Bayne	206 (–18)
	6	Brendan Gaughan	193 (–31)
	7	Brian Scott	192 (–32)
	8	Dylan Kwasniewski	179 (–45)
	9	James Buescher	176 (–48)
2	10	Ryan Reed	141 (–83)
Official driver's standings

- Note: Only the first 10 positions are included for the driver standings.

Previous race: 2014 TreatMyClot.com 300	NASCAR Nationwide Series; 2014 season	Next race: 2014 VFW Sport Clips Help a Hero 200
