= 2015 American Ethanol E15 225 =

16th race of the 2015 NASCAR Camping World Truck Series

Race details
- Race 16 of 23 of the 2015 NASCAR Camping World Truck Series
- Date: September 19, 2015
- Official name: 7th Annual American Ethanol E15 225
- Location: Chicagoland Speedway, Joliet, Illinois
- Course: Permanent racing facility
- Course length: 1.5 miles (2.4 km)
- Distance: 150 laps, 225 mi (362 km)
- Scheduled distance: 150 laps, 225 mi (362 km)
- Average speed: 120.715 mph (194.272 km/h)

Pole position
Driver	Kyle Larson	JR Motorsports
- Grid positions set by competition-based formula

Most laps led
Driver	Kyle Larson	JR Motorsports
- Laps: 49

Winner
No. 8	John Hunter Nemechek	SWM-NEMCO Motorsports

Television in the United States
- Network: FS2
- Announcers: Ralph Sheheen, Phil Parsons, and Michael Waltrip

Radio in the United States
- Radio: MRN

The 2015 American Ethanol E15 225 was the 16th stock car race of the 2015 NASCAR Camping World Truck Series, and the 7th iteration of the event. The race was originally going to be held on Friday, September 18, 2015, but due to persistent rain showers, it was postponed until Saturday, September 19. It was held in Joliet, Illinois at Chicagoland Speedway, a 1.5 mi (2.4 km) permanent tri-oval shaped racetrack. The race took the scheduled 150 laps to complete. John Hunter Nemechek, driving for family-owned SWM-NEMCO Motorsports, would pull off the upset win, after the leader of Kyle Larson ran out of fuel with two laps to go. This was Nemechek's first career NASCAR Camping World Truck Series win. Larson, Johnny Sauter, and Timothy Peters dominated the entire race, leading 49, 52, and 41 laps. To fill out the podium, Tyler Reddick, driving for his team, Brad Keselowski Racing, and Peters, driving for Red Horse Racing, would finish 2nd and 3rd, respectively.

== Background ==
Chicagoland Speedway is a 1.5 miles (2.4 km) tri-oval speedway with a curved backstretch in Joliet, Illinois, southwest of Chicago. The speedway opened in 2001 and actively hosts NASCAR racing including the NASCAR Sprint Cup Series. Until 2010, the speedway has also hosted the IndyCar Series, recording numerous close finishes including the closest finish in IndyCar history. The speedway is owned and operated by NASCAR subsidiary International Speedway Corporation.

=== Entry list ===
- (R) denotes rookie driver.
- (i) denotes driver who is ineligible for series driver points.

#	Driver	Team	Make	Sponsor
00	Kyle Larson (i)	JR Motorsports	Chevrolet	Haas Automation
0	Caleb Roark	Jennifer Jo Cobb Racing	Chevrolet	Driven2Honor.org
1	Travis Kvapil	MAKE Motorsports	Chevrolet	Landworks
02	Tyler Young	Young's Motorsports	Chevrolet	Faro
4	Erik Jones (R)	Kyle Busch Motorsports	Toyota	Toyota Certified Used Vehicles
05	John Wes Townley	Athenian Motorsports	Chevrolet	Zaxby's
6	Norm Benning	Norm Benning Racing	Chevrolet	Norm Benning Racing
07	Ray Black Jr. (R)	SS-Green Light Racing	Chevrolet	ScubaLife
08	Korbin Forrister (R)	BJMM with SS-Green Light Racing	Chevrolet	Trump for President
8	John Hunter Nemechek (R)	SWM-NEMCO Motorsports	Chevrolet	SWM-NEMCO Motorsports
10	Jennifer Jo Cobb	Jennifer Jo Cobb Racing	Chevrolet	Driven2Honor.org, POW-MIA
11	Ben Kennedy	Red Horse Racing	Toyota	Local Motors
13	Cameron Hayley (R)	ThorSport Racing	Toyota	Carolina Nut Co.
14	Daniel Hemric (R)	NTS Motorsports	Chevrolet	California Clean Power
15	Mason Mingus	Billy Boat Motorsports	Chevrolet	Call 811 Before You Dig
16	Chad Boat	Billy Boat Motorsports	Chevrolet	CorvetteParts.net
17	Timothy Peters	Red Horse Racing	Toyota	Red Horse Racing
18	Ross Chastain (i)	Hattori Racing Enterprises	Toyota	Aisin
19	Tyler Reddick	Brad Keselowski Racing	Ford	Stoney Creek Records
23	Spencer Gallagher (R)	GMS Racing	Chevrolet	Alamo Rent a Car
29	Austin Theriault (R)	Brad Keselowski Racing	Ford	Cooper-Standard Automotive
30	Chad Finley	Rette Jones Racing	Ford	Auto Value
33	Brandon Jones (R)	GMS Racing	Chevrolet	American Ethanol
36	Tyler Tanner	MB Motorsports	Chevrolet	Mittler Bros., Ski Soda
45	B. J. McLeod	B. J. McLeod Motorsports	Chevrolet	Tilted Kilt
50	Ryan Ellis	MAKE Motorsports	Chevrolet	Landworks
51	Daniel Suárez (i)	Kyle Busch Motorsports	Toyota	Arris
54	Matt Tifft	Kyle Busch Motorsports	Toyota	NASCAR '15 Victory Edition
63	Justin Jennings	MB Motorsports	Chevrolet	Excel Bottling, Ski Soda, LG Seeds
74	Jordan Anderson	Mike Harmon Racing	Chevrolet	Columbia SC - Famously Hot
88	Matt Crafton	ThorSport Racing	Toyota	Slim Jim, Menards
94	Timmy Hill	Premium Motorsports	Chevrolet	Testoril
97	Jesse Little	JJL Motorsports	Toyota	Protect the Harvest
98	Johnny Sauter	ThorSport Racing	Toyota	Nextant Aerospace, Curb Records
Official entry list

== Practice ==
The first and only practice session was held on Saturday, August 29, at 9:30 AM EST, and would last for 55 minutes. Kyle Larson, driving for JR Motorsports, would set the fastest time in the session, with a lap of 30.848, and an average speed of 175.052 mph (281.719 km/h).

Pos.	#	Driver	Team	Make	Time	Speed
1	00	Kyle Larson (i)	JR Motorsports	Chevrolet	30.848	175.052
2	88	Matt Crafton	ThorSport Racing	Toyota	30.863	174.967
3	98	Johnny Sauter	ThorSport Racing	Toyota	30.870	174.927
Full practice results

== Starting lineup ==
Qualifying was scheduled to be held on Friday, September 18, at 3:35 PM CST, but was cancelled after persistent rain showers. The starting lineup would be determined by practice speeds. As a result, Kyle Larson, driving for JR Motorsports, would earn the pole. Chad Boat and Ross Chastain would fail to qualify.

=== Starting lineup ===
Pos.	#	Driver	Team	Make
1	00	Kyle Larson (i)	JR Motorsports	Chevrolet
2	88	Matt Crafton	ThorSport Racing	Toyota
3	98	Johnny Sauter	ThorSport Racing	Toyota
4	19	Tyler Reddick	Brad Keselowski Racing	Ford
5	17	Timothy Peters	Red Horse Racing	Toyota
6	51	Daniel Suárez (i)	Kyle Busch Motorsports	Toyota
7	13	Cameron Hayley (R)	ThorSport Racing	Toyota
8	4	Erik Jones (R)	Kyle Busch Motorsports	Toyota
9	11	Ben Kennedy	Red Horse Racing	Toyota
10	33	Brandon Jones (R)	GMS Racing	Chevrolet
11	8	John Hunter Nemechek (R)	SWM-NEMCO Motorsports	Chevrolet
12	29	Austin Theriault (R)	Brad Keselowski Racing	Ford
13	05	John Wes Townley	Athenian Motorsports	Chevrolet
14	14	Daniel Hemric (R)	NTS Motorsports	Chevrolet
15	97	Jesse Little	JJL Motorsports	Toyota
16	30	Chad Finley	Rette Jones Racing	Ford
17	02	Tyler Young	Young's Motorsports	Chevrolet
18	54	Matt Tifft	Kyle Busch Motorsports	Toyota
19	23	Spencer Gallagher (R)	GMS Racing	Chevrolet
20	15	Mason Mingus	Billy Boat Motorsports	Chevrolet
21	07	Ray Black Jr. (R)	SS-Green Light Racing	Chevrolet
22	63	Justin Jennings	MB Motorsports	Chevrolet
23	45	B. J. McLeod	B. J. McLeod Motorsports	Chevrolet
24	36	Tyler Tanner	MB Motorsports	Chevrolet
25	1	Travis Kvapil	MAKE Motorsports	Chevrolet
26	08	Korbin Forrister (R)	BJMM with SS-Green Light Racing	Chevrolet
27	10	Jennifer Jo Cobb	Jennifer Jo Cobb Racing	Chevrolet
28	74	Jordan Anderson	Mike Harmon Racing	Chevrolet
29	50	Ryan Ellis	MAKE Motorsports	Chevrolet
30	94	Timmy Hill	Premium Motorsports	Chevrolet
31	0	Caleb Roark	Jennifer Jo Cobb Racing	Chevrolet
32	6	Norm Benning	Norm Benning Racing	Chevrolet
Failed to qualify
33	16	Chad Boat	Billy Boat Motorsports	Chevrolet
34	18	Ross Chastain (i)	Hattori Racing Enterprises	Toyota
Official starting lineup

== Race results ==
Fin	St	#	Driver	Team	Make	Laps	Led	Status	Pts	Winnings
1	11	8	John Hunter Nemechek (R)	SWM-NEMCO Motorsports	Chevrolet	150	2	Running	47	$46,978
2	4	19	Tyler Reddick	Brad Keselowski Racing	Ford	150	1	Running	43	$41,217
3	5	17	Timothy Peters	Red Horse Racing	Toyota	150	41	Running	42	$29,417
4	6	51	Daniel Suárez (i)	Kyle Busch Motorsports	Toyota	150	3	Running	0	$19,769
5	3	98	Johnny Sauter	ThorSport Racing	Toyota	150	52	Running	41	$21,861
6	8	4	Erik Jones (R)	Kyle Busch Motorsports	Toyota	150	0	Running	38	$18,948
7	1	00	Kyle Larson (i)	JR Motorsports	Chevrolet	149	49	Running	0	$16,558
8	19	23	Spencer Gallagher (R)	GMS Racing	Chevrolet	149	0	Running	36	$18,724
9	18	54	Matt Tifft	Kyle Busch Motorsports	Toyota	149	0	Running	35	$18,640
10	13	05	John Wes Townley	Athenian Motorsports	Chevrolet	149	0	Running	34	$19,534
11	21	07	Ray Black Jr. (R)	SS-Green Light Racing	Chevrolet	148	2	Running	34	$18,500
12	9	11	Ben Kennedy	Red Horse Racing	Toyota	148	0	Running	32	$18,360
13	12	29	Austin Theriault (R)	Brad Keselowski Racing	Ford	147	0	Running	31	$18,332
14	2	88	Matt Crafton	ThorSport Racing	Toyota	147	0	Running	30	$19,276
15	17	02	Tyler Young	Young's Motorsports	Chevrolet	147	0	Running	29	$18,620
16	7	13	Cameron Hayley (R)	ThorSport Racing	Toyota	146	0	Running	28	$18,137
17	10	33	Brandon Jones (R)	GMS Racing	Chevrolet	145	0	Running	27	$18,053
18	30	94	Timmy Hill	Premium Motorsports	Chevrolet	144	0	Running	26	$18,025
19	22	63	Justin Jennings	MB Motorsports	Chevrolet	144	0	Running	25	$18,169
20	28	74	Jordan Anderson	Mike Harmon Racing	Chevrolet	143	0	Running	24	$18,386
21	16	30	Chad Finley	Rette Jones Racing	Ford	141	0	Running	23	$15,607
22	32	6	Norm Benning	Norm Benning Racing	Chevrolet	102	0	Running	22	$16,580
23	27	10	Jennifer Jo Cobb	Jennifer Jo Cobb Racing	Chevrolet	96	0	Running	21	$16,551
24	25	1	Travis Kvapil	MAKE Motorsports	Chevrolet	93	0	Rear Gear	20	$15,523
25	14	14	Daniel Hemric (R)	NTS Motorsports	Chevrolet	90	0	Running	19	$15,645
26	20	15	Mason Mingus	Billy Boat Motorsports	Chevrolet	79	0	Accident	18	$15,468
27	26	08	Korbin Forrister (R)	BJMM with SS-Green Light Racing	Chevrolet	41	0	Engine	17	$15,439
28	23	45	B. J. McLeod	B. J. McLeod Motorsports	Chevrolet	25	0	Vibration	16	$15,206
29	29	50	Ryan Ellis	MAKE Motorsports	Chevrolet	18	0	Vibration	15	$15,150
30	15	97	Jesse Little	JJL Motorsports	Toyota	14	0	Engine	14	$14,650
31	31	0	Caleb Roark	Jennifer Jo Cobb Racing	Chevrolet	14	0	Brakes	13	$13,150
32	24	36	Tyler Tanner	MB Motorsports	Chevrolet	5	0	Engine	12	$12,150
Official race results

== Standings after the race ==
Drivers' Championship standings

	Pos	Driver	Points
	1	Erik Jones	628
1	2	Tyler Reddick	618 (-10)
1	3	Matt Crafton	617 (–11)
	4	Johnny Sauter	576 (–52)
	5	Daniel Hemric	519 (–109)
	6	Cameron Hayley	517 (–111)
	7	Timothy Peters	512 (–116)
	8	John Wes Townley	500 (–128)
	9	Spencer Gallagher	488 (–140)
	10	Ben Kennedy	483 (–145)
Official driver's standings

- Note: Only the first 10 positions are included for the driver standings.

Previous race: 2015 Chevrolet Silverado 250	NASCAR Camping World Truck Series; 2015 season	Next race: 2015 UNOH 175
