= 2014 TreatMyClot.com 300 =

Fifth race of the 2014 NASCAR Nationwide Series

Race details
- Race 5 of 33 of the 2014 NASCAR Nationwide Series
- Date: March 22, 2014
- Official name: 18th Annual TreatMyClot.com 300
- Location: Fontana, California, Auto Club Speedway
- Course: Permanent racing facility
- Course length: 2 miles (3.2 km)
- Distance: 150 laps, 300 mi (482.803 km)
- Scheduled distance: 150 laps, 300 mi (482.803 km)
- Average speed: 143.942 miles per hour (231.652 km/h)

Pole position
| Driver | Elliott Sadler | Joe Gibbs Racing |
- Time: 40.680

Most laps led
| Driver | Joey Logano | Team Penske |
- Laps: 96

Winner
| No. 42 | Kyle Larson | Turner Scott Motorsports |

Television in the United States
- Network: ESPN
- Announcers: Allen Bestwick, Rusty Wallace, Andy Petree

Radio in the United States
- Radio: Motor Racing Network

The 2014 TreatMyClot.com 300 was the fifth stock car race of the 2014 NASCAR Nationwide Series season, and the 18th iteration of the event. The race was held on Saturday, March 22, 2014, in Fontana, California, at Auto Club Speedway, a 2 miles (3.2 km) permanent D-shaped oval racetrack. The race took the scheduled 150 laps to complete. On the final restart with 16 to go, Kyle Larson, driving for Turner Scott Motorsports, would hold off fierce charges from the field to win his first career NASCAR Nationwide Series win and his first of the season. To fill out the podium, Kevin Harvick, driving for JR Motorsports, and Kyle Busch, driving for Joe Gibbs Racing, would finish second and third, respectively.

== Background ==
The layout of Auto Club Speedway, the venue where the race was held.

Auto Club Speedway (previously California Speedway) was a two-mile (3.2 km), low-banked, D-shaped oval superspeedway in Fontana, California which hosted NASCAR racing annually from 1997 to 2023. It was also used for open wheel racing events. The racetrack was located near the former locations of Ontario Motor Speedway and Riverside International Raceway. The track was owned and operated by International Speedway Corporation and was the only track owned by ISC to have its naming rights sold. The speedway was served by the nearby Interstate 10 and Interstate 15 freeways as well as a Metrolink station located behind the backstretch.

=== Entry list ===
- (R) denotes rookie driver.
- (i) denotes driver who is ineligible for series driver points.

| # | Driver | Team | Make | Sponsor |
|---|---|---|---|---|
| 01 | Landon Cassill | JD Motorsports | Chevrolet | Flex Seal |
| 2 | Brian Scott | Richard Childress Racing | Chevrolet | Anderson's Maple Syrup |
| 3 | Ty Dillon (R) | Richard Childress Racing | Chevrolet | WESCO |
| 4 | Jeffrey Earnhardt | JD Motorsports | Chevrolet | Shakey's, K1 Speed |
| 5 | Kevin Harvick (i) | JR Motorsports | Chevrolet | TaxSlayer |
| 6 | Trevor Bayne | Roush Fenway Racing | Ford | AdvoCare |
| 7 | Regan Smith | JR Motorsports | Chevrolet | Hellmann's and Best Foods |
| 9 | Chase Elliott (R) | JR Motorsports | Chevrolet | NAPA Auto Parts |
| 10 | Blake Koch | TriStar Motorsports | Toyota | SupportMilitary.org |
| 11 | Elliott Sadler | Joe Gibbs Racing | Toyota | Sport Clips Haircuts |
| 14 | Eric McClure | TriStar Motorsports | Toyota | Hefty Ultimate |
| 16 | Ryan Reed (R) | Roush Fenway Racing | Ford | Lilly Diabetes |
| 17 | Tanner Berryhill (R) | Vision Racing | Dodge | BWP Bats |
| 19 | Mike Bliss | TriStar Motorsports | Toyota | DoubleTree |
| 20 | Matt Kenseth (i) | Joe Gibbs Racing | Toyota | GameStop, Turtle Beach |
| 22 | Joey Logano (i) | Team Penske | Ford | Discount Tire |
| 23 | Carlos Contreras | Rick Ware Racing | Chevrolet | Voli 38 Special |
| 24 | Jason White | SR² Motorsports | Toyota | Be/More, Hoodz Ductz |
| 28 | Mike Wallace | JGL Racing | Dodge | JGL Racing |
| 31 | Dylan Kwasniewski (R) | Turner Scott Motorsports | Chevrolet | Rockstar |
| 39 | Ryan Sieg (R) | RSS Racing | Chevrolet | Pull-A-Part |
| 40 | Josh Wise (i) | The Motorsports Group | Chevrolet | The Motorsports Group |
| 42 | Kyle Larson (i) | Turner Scott Motorsports | Chevrolet | Cartwheel by Target |
| 43 | Dakoda Armstrong (R) | Richard Petty Motorsports | Ford | Charter Communications |
| 44 | David Starr | TriStar Motorsports | Toyota | Niece Equipment |
| 46 | Matt DiBenedetto | The Motorsports Group | Chevrolet | The Motorsports Group |
| 51 | Jeremy Clements | Jeremy Clements Racing | Chevrolet | RepairableVehicles.com |
| 52 | Joey Gase | Jimmy Means Racing | Chevrolet | Jimmy Means Racing |
| 54 | Kyle Busch (i) | Joe Gibbs Racing | Toyota | Monster Energy |
| 55 | Jamie Dick | Viva Motorsports | Chevrolet | Viva Motorsports |
| 60 | Chris Buescher (R) | Roush Fenway Racing | Ford | Roush Performance |
| 62 | Brendan Gaughan | Richard Childress Racing | Chevrolet | WIX Filters |
| 70 | Derrike Cope | Derrike Cope Racing | Chevrolet | Youtheory |
| 74 | Kevin Lepage | Mike Harmon Racing | Dodge | Mike Harmon Racing |
| 79 | Carl Long (i) | Jimmy Means Racing | Toyota | Donate Life Nevada |
| 87 | Daryl Harr | JD Motorsports | Chevrolet | Champions Against Bullying, PasmaCar |
| 91 | Jeff Green (i) | TriStar Motorsports | Toyota | Hefty Ultimate |
| 93 | J. J. Yeley | JGL Racing | Dodge | JGL Racing |
| 98 | David Ragan (i) | Biagi-DenBeste Racing | Ford | Carroll Shelby Engine Co., DenBeste Heavy Equipment Rentals |
| 99 | James Buescher | RAB Racing | Toyota | Rheem |
Official entry list

== Practice ==
=== First practice ===
The first practice session was held on Friday, March 21, at 1:40 PM PST. The session would last for 50 minutes. Kyle Busch, driving for Joe Gibbs Racing, would set the fastest time in the session, with a lap of 41.342 and an average speed of 174.157 miles per hour (280.279 km/h).

| Pos. | # | Driver | Team | Make | Time | Speed |
|---|---|---|---|---|---|---|
| 1 | 54 | Kyle Busch (i) | Joe Gibbs Racing | Toyota | 41.342 | 174.157 |
| 2 | 5 | Kevin Harvick (i) | JR Motorsports | Chevrolet | 41.494 | 173.519 |
| 3 | 22 | Joey Logano (i) | Team Penske | Ford | 41.551 | 173.281 |
Full first practice results

=== Second and final practice ===
The final practice session, sometimes referred to as Happy Hour, was held on Friday, March 21, at 3:00 PM PST. The session would last for one hour and 25 minutes. Ty Dillon, driving for Richard Childress Racing, would set the fastest time in the session, with a lap of 40.802 and an average speed of 176.462 miles per hour (283.988 km/h).

| Pos. | # | Driver | Team | Make | Time | Speed |
|---|---|---|---|---|---|---|
| 1 | 3 | Ty Dillon (R) | Richard Childress Racing | Chevrolet | 40.802 | 176.462 |
| 2 | 9 | Chase Elliott (R) | JR Motorsports | Chevrolet | 41.221 | 174.668 |
| 3 | 99 | James Buescher | RAB Racing | Toyota | 41.326 | 174.224 |
Full Happy Hour practice results

== Qualifying ==
Qualifying was held on Saturday, March 22, at 10:40 AM PST. Since Auto Club Speedway is at least 1.25 miles (2.01 km) in length, the qualifying system was a multi-car system that included three rounds. The first round was 25 minutes, where every driver would be able to set a lap within the 25 minutes. Then, the second round would consist of the fastest 24 cars in Round 1, and drivers would have 10 minutes to set a lap. Round 3 consisted of the fastest 12 drivers from Round 2, and the drivers would have 5 minutes to set a time. Whoever was fastest in Round 3 would win the pole.

Elliott Sadler, driving for Joe Gibbs Racing, would win the pole after setting a time of 40.680 and an average speed of 176.991 mph (284.839 km/h) in the third round.

No drivers would fail to qualify.

=== Full qualifying results ===
| Pos. | # | Driver | Team | Make | Time (R1) | Speed (R1) | Time (R2) | Speed (R2) | Time (R3) | Speed (R3) |
|---|---|---|---|---|---|---|---|---|---|---|
| 1 | 11 | Elliott Sadler | Joe Gibbs Racing | Toyota | -* | -* | -* | -* | 40.680 | 176.991 |
| 2 | 20 | Matt Kenseth (i) | Joe Gibbs Racing | Toyota | -* | -* | -* | -* | 40.690 | 176.948 |
| 3 | 3 | Ty Dillon (R) | Richard Childress Racing | Chevrolet | -* | -* | -* | -* | 40.748 | 176.696 |
| 4 | 22 | Joey Logano (i) | Team Penske | Ford | -* | -* | -* | -* | 40.750 | 176.687 |
| 5 | 9 | Chase Elliott (R) | JR Motorsports | Chevrolet | -* | -* | -* | -* | 40.775 | 176.579 |
| 6 | 5 | Kevin Harvick (i) | JR Motorsports | Chevrolet | -* | -* | -* | -* | 40.816 | 176.401 |
| 7 | 31 | Dylan Kwasniewski (R) | Turner Scott Motorsports | Chevrolet | -* | -* | -* | -* | 40.849 | 176.259 |
| 8 | 42 | Kyle Larson (i) | Turner Scott Motorsports | Chevrolet | -* | -* | -* | -* | 40.851 | 176.250 |
| 9 | 2 | Brian Scott | Richard Childress Racing | Chevrolet | -* | -* | -* | -* | 40.869 | 176.173 |
| 10 | 62 | Brendan Gaughan | Richard Childress Racing | Chevrolet | -* | -* | -* | -* | 40.930 | 175.910 |
| 11 | 7 | Regan Smith | JR Motorsports | Chevrolet | -* | -* | -* | -* | 40.966 | 175.756 |
| 12 | 99 | James Buescher | RAB Racing | Toyota | -* | -* | -* | -* | 41.418 | 173.837 |
Eliminated in Round 2
| 13 | 6 | Trevor Bayne | Roush Fenway Racing | Ford | -* | -* | 41.124 | 175.080 | - | - |
| 14 | 93 | J. J. Yeley | JGL Racing | Dodge | -* | -* | 41.170 | 174.885 | - | - |
| 15 | 16 | Ryan Reed (R) | Roush Fenway Racing | Ford | -* | -* | 41.286 | 174.393 | - | - |
| 16 | 98 | David Ragan (i) | Biagi-DenBeste Racing | Ford | -* | -* | 41.309 | 174.296 | - | - |
| 17 | 39 | Ryan Sieg (R) | RSS Racing | Chevrolet | -* | -* | 41.457 | 173.674 | - | - |
| 18 | 19 | Mike Bliss | TriStar Motorsports | Toyota | -* | -* | 41.474 | 173.603 | - | - |
| 19 | 60 | Chris Buescher (R) | Roush Fenway Racing | Ford | -* | -* | 41.657 | 172.840 | - | - |
| 20 | 51 | Jeremy Clements | Jeremy Clements Racing | Chevrolet | -* | -* | 41.908 | 171.805 | - | - |
| 21 | 44 | David Starr | TriStar Motorsports | Toyota | -* | -* | 41.944 | 171.657 | - | - |
| 22 | 46 | Matt DiBenedetto | The Motorsports Group | Chevrolet | 41.969 | 171.555 | - | - | - | - |
| 23 | 01 | Landon Cassill | JD Motorsports | Chevrolet | 41.983 | 171.498 | - | - | - | - |
| 24 | 40 | Josh Wise (i) | The Motorsports Group | Chevrolet | 42.015 | 171.367 | - | - | - | - |
Eliminated in Round 1
| 25 | 4 | Jeffrey Earnhardt | JD Motorsports | Chevrolet | 42.071 | 171.139 | - | - | - | - |
| 26 | 28 | Mike Wallace | JGL Racing | Dodge | 42.145 | 170.839 | - | - | - | - |
| 27 | 43 | Dakoda Armstrong (R) | Richard Petty Motorsports | Ford | 42.148 | 170.827 | - | - | - | - |
| 28 | 74 | Kevin Lepage | Mike Harmon Racing | Dodge | 42.187 | 170.669 | - | - | - | - |
| 29 | 91 | Jeff Green (i) | TriStar Motorsports | Toyota | 42.271 | 170.330 | - | - | - | - |
| 30 | 52 | Joey Gase | Jimmy Means Racing | Chevrolet | 42.283 | 170.281 | - | - | - | - |
| 31 | 17 | Tanner Berryhill (R) | Vision Racing | Dodge | 42.307 | 170.185 | - | - | - | - |
| 32 | 10 | Blake Koch | TriStar Motorsports | Toyota | 42.424 | 169.715 | - | - | - | - |
| 33 | 14 | Eric McClure | TriStar Motorsports | Toyota | 42.448 | 169.619 | - | - | - | - |
| 34 | 55 | Jamie Dick | Viva Motorsports | Chevrolet | 42.564 | 169.157 | - | - | - | - |
| 35 | 87 | Daryl Harr | JD Motorsports | Chevrolet | 43.034 | 167.310 | - | - | - | - |
| 36 | 70 | Derrike Cope | Derrike Cope Racing | Chevrolet | 44.032 | 163.517 | - | - | - | - |
| 37 | 23 | Carlos Contreras | Rick Ware Racing | Chevrolet | 44.588 | 161.478 | - | - | - | - |
| 38 | 24 | Jason White | SR² Motorsports | Toyota | 45.671 | 157.649 | - | - | - | - |
| 39 | 54 | Kyle Busch (i) | Joe Gibbs Racing | Toyota | - | - | - | - | - | - |
Last car to qualify on time
| 40 | 79 | Carl Long (i) | Jimmy Means Racing | Toyota | 44.258 | 162.682 | - | - | - | - |
Official starting lineup

*Time not available.

== Race results ==
| Fin | St | # | Driver | Team | Make | Laps | Led | Status | Pts | Winnings |
|---|---|---|---|---|---|---|---|---|---|---|
| 1 | 8 | 42 | Kyle Larson (i) | Turner Scott Motorsports | Chevrolet | 150 | 17 | running | 0 | $66,800 |
| 2 | 6 | 5 | Kevin Harvick (i) | JR Motorsports | Chevrolet | 150 | 8 | running | 0 | $54,100 |
| 3 | 39 | 54 | Kyle Busch (i) | Joe Gibbs Racing | Toyota | 150 | 25 | running | 0 | $45,525 |
| 4 | 4 | 22 | Joey Logano (i) | Team Penske | Ford | 150 | 96 | running | 0 | $36,325 |
| 5 | 1 | 11 | Elliott Sadler | Joe Gibbs Racing | Toyota | 150 | 0 | running | 39 | $39,982 |
| 6 | 5 | 9 | Chase Elliott (R) | JR Motorsports | Chevrolet | 150 | 2 | running | 39 | $31,606 |
| 7 | 2 | 20 | Matt Kenseth (i) | Joe Gibbs Racing | Toyota | 150 | 0 | running | 0 | $22,400 |
| 8 | 3 | 3 | Ty Dillon (R) | Richard Childress Racing | Chevrolet | 150 | 0 | running | 36 | $27,231 |
| 9 | 13 | 6 | Trevor Bayne | Roush Fenway Racing | Ford | 150 | 0 | running | 35 | $26,091 |
| 10 | 11 | 7 | Regan Smith | JR Motorsports | Chevrolet | 150 | 0 | running | 34 | $28,081 |
| 11 | 7 | 31 | Dylan Kwasniewski (R) | Turner Scott Motorsports | Chevrolet | 150 | 0 | running | 33 | $25,756 |
| 12 | 9 | 2 | Brian Scott | Richard Childress Racing | Chevrolet | 150 | 2 | running | 32 | $25,456 |
| 13 | 16 | 98 | David Ragan (i) | Biagi-DenBeste Racing | Ford | 150 | 0 | running | 0 | $18,975 |
| 14 | 19 | 60 | Chris Buescher (R) | Roush Fenway Racing | Ford | 150 | 0 | running | 30 | $24,996 |
| 15 | 10 | 62 | Brendan Gaughan | Richard Childress Racing | Chevrolet | 150 | 0 | running | 29 | $25,611 |
| 16 | 12 | 99 | James Buescher | RAB Racing | Toyota | 150 | 0 | running | 28 | $24,951 |
| 17 | 15 | 16 | Ryan Reed (R) | Roush Fenway Racing | Ford | 149 | 0 | running | 27 | $24,541 |
| 18 | 18 | 19 | Mike Bliss | TriStar Motorsports | Toyota | 149 | 0 | running | 26 | $24,406 |
| 19 | 14 | 93 | J. J. Yeley | JGL Racing | Dodge | 149 | 0 | running | 25 | $24,296 |
| 20 | 27 | 43 | Dakoda Armstrong (R) | Richard Petty Motorsports | Ford | 148 | 0 | running | 24 | $24,886 |
| 21 | 26 | 28 | Mike Wallace | JGL Racing | Dodge | 148 | 0 | running | 23 | $24,076 |
| 22 | 17 | 39 | Ryan Sieg (R) | RSS Racing | Chevrolet | 148 | 0 | running | 22 | $23,911 |
| 23 | 25 | 4 | Jeffrey Earnhardt | JD Motorsports | Chevrolet | 147 | 0 | running | 21 | $23,826 |
| 24 | 21 | 44 | David Starr | TriStar Motorsports | Toyota | 147 | 0 | running | 20 | $23,666 |
| 25 | 33 | 14 | Eric McClure | TriStar Motorsports | Toyota | 146 | 0 | running | 19 | $24,031 |
| 26 | 30 | 52 | Joey Gase | Jimmy Means Racing | Chevrolet | 145 | 0 | running | 18 | $23,421 |
| 27 | 35 | 87 | Daryl Harr | JD Motorsports | Chevrolet | 145 | 0 | running | 17 | $23,286 |
| 28 | 36 | 70 | Derrike Cope | Derrike Cope Racing | Chevrolet | 143 | 0 | running | 16 | $23,166 |
| 29 | 37 | 23 | Carlos Contreras | Rick Ware Racing | Chevrolet | 140 | 0 | running | 15 | $22,991 |
| 30 | 28 | 74 | Kevin Lepage | Mike Harmon Racing | Dodge | 140 | 0 | running | 14 | $23,181 |
| 31 | 31 | 17 | Tanner Berryhill (R) | Vision Racing | Dodge | 131 | 0 | running | 13 | $22,751 |
| 32 | 38 | 24 | Jason White | SR² Motorsports | Toyota | 128 | 0 | power steering | 12 | $22,641 |
| 33 | 24 | 40 | Josh Wise (i) | The Motorsports Group | Chevrolet | 126 | 0 | engine | 0 | $16,320 |
| 34 | 34 | 55 | Jamie Dick | Viva Motorsports | Chevrolet | 126 | 0 | running | 10 | $22,415 |
| 35 | 23 | 01 | Landon Cassill | JD Motorsports | Chevrolet | 108 | 0 | fuel pump | 9 | $22,294 |
| 36 | 20 | 51 | Jeremy Clements | Jeremy Clements Racing | Chevrolet | 107 | 0 | running | 8 | $20,801 |
| 37 | 22 | 46 | Matt DiBenedetto | The Motorsports Group | Chevrolet | 8 | 0 | vibration | 7 | $14,475 |
| 38 | 40 | 79 | Carl Long (i) | Jimmy Means Racing | Toyota | 7 | 0 | electrical | 0 | $14,365 |
| 39 | 32 | 10 | Blake Koch | TriStar Motorsports | Toyota | 6 | 0 | vibration | 5 | $14,115 |
| 40 | 29 | 91 | Jeff Green (i) | TriStar Motorsports | Toyota | 4 | 0 | vibration | 0 | $14,080 |
Official race results

== Standings after the race ==
Drivers' Championship standings

| | Pos | Driver | Points |
|---|---|---|---|
| | 1 | Regan Smith | 185 |
| | 2 | Trevor Bayne | 185 (-0) |
| | 3 | Ty Dillon | 179 (-6) |
| | 4 | Chase Elliott | 177 (–8) |
| | 5 | Elliott Sadler | 174 (–11) |
| | 6 | Brendan Gaughan | 160 (–25) |
| | 7 | Brian Scott | 160 (–25) |
| 1 | 8 | Dylan Kwasniewski | 149 (–36) |
| 1 | 9 | James Buescher | 145 (–40) |
| 1 | 10 | Mike Bliss | 125 (–60) |
Official driver's standings

- Note: Only the first 10 positions are included for the driver standings.

| Previous race: 2014 Drive to Stop Diabetes 300 | NASCAR Nationwide Series; 2014 season | Next race: 2014 O'Reilly Auto Parts 300 |
