= Service King Collision Repair =

American chain of car repair shops

Crash Champions
- Logo used until 2022
- Formerly: Service King Collision Repair Centers, Inc. (1976–2022)
- Type: Private
- Industry: Auto repair service
- Founded: 1976; 50 years ago
- Founder: Eddie Lennox
- Defunct: 2022
- Headquarters: Richardson, Texas, United States
- Number of locations: 335 locations (Feb 2022)
- Area served: Texas, Arizona, Illinois, Florida, Michigan, Ohio, Arkansas, Oklahoma, Mississippi, Georgia, Nevada, Pennsylvania, Virginia, Colorado, New York, Indiana, South Carolina, Washington, Delaware, Maryland, North Carolina, Tennessee
- Key people: Eddie Lennox, founder David Cush, CEO; Jeff McFadden, President
- Services: Auto repair, collision repair
- Revenue: $710 million (US) (2013)
- Parent: The Carlyle Group (minority); The Blackstone Group (majority)
- Website: www.serviceking.com

Crash Champions (Known as Service King Collision Repair until 2022) is a national automotive collision repair company. It was founded in 1976 by Eddie Lennox in Dallas, Texas. Service King was one of largest providers of collision repair services in Texas and the United States. In 2022, all locations were rebranded as Crash Champions as a result of a merger.

== History ==
Service King was founded by Eddie Lennox in 1976. Its first location was in Dallas.

In 2009, the then-independently owned Service King bought the three-location D&D Collision chain in the Houston area.

In 2012, The Carlyle Group purchased a majority stake in Service King. Around that time, it expanded into Arizona. Global investment and advisory group Blackstone purchased majority ownership in Service King in July 2014. Service King eclipsed the 200-location milestone by December 2014 by purchasing Seattle-headquartered Kirmac Collision Services to expand its footprint in the Pacific northwest. Service King hit the 300-location mark in August 2016; it also opened a 70,000 square foot center in Milpitas, California around that time. In 2017, Blackstone and Carlyle looked at selling Service King for up to $2 billion (US). Service King opened a new corporate office located in Richardson, Texas in early 2017.

On July 14, 2022, a merger between Service King and Crash Champions was announced. All Service King locations were rebranded as Crash Champions.

== Partnerships ==
Service King has started Mission 2 Hire as its own program to help employ veterans with a goal of hiring 500 veterans and veterans families in five years.

Service King partnered with the NASCAR Xfinity Series in 2017 to become the title sponsor of the Service King 300, held in March at the Auto Club Speedway of Southern California.

== Locations ==
Service King has locations in the following states:

- Texas
- California
- Washington
- Nevada
- Utah
- Arizona
- Colorado
- Oklahoma
- Arkansas
- Mississippi
- Illinois
- Tennessee
- Michigan
- Ohio
- Pennsylvania
- New York
- Maryland
- Virginia
- North Carolina
- Georgia
- Florida
