= Chad Boat =

American racing driver (born 1992)

- Born: January 30, 1992 (age 34); Phoenix, Arizona, U.S.
- Achievements: 2020 USAC National Midget championship team co-owner (Tucker/Boat Motorsports)

NASCAR O'Reilly Auto Parts Series career
- 17 races run over 2 years
- 2015 position: 105th
- Best finish: 29th (2014)
- First race: 2014 DRIVE4COPD 300 (Daytona)
- Last race: 2015 Hisense 300 (Charlotte)
Wins	Top tens	Poles
0	0	0

NASCAR FedEx Freight Truck Series career
- 4 races run over 1 year
- 2015 position: 38th
- Best finish: 38th (2015)
- First race: 2015 Mudsummer Classic (Eldora)
- Last race: 2015 Lucas Oil 150 (Phoenix)
Wins	Top tens	Poles
0	1	0
- Statistics up to date as of November 13, 2015.

Chad Boat (born January 30, 1992) is an American professional dirt track racing driver and team owner. The son of former driver Billy Boat, he has raced in Indy Lights and NASCAR.

== Racing career ==
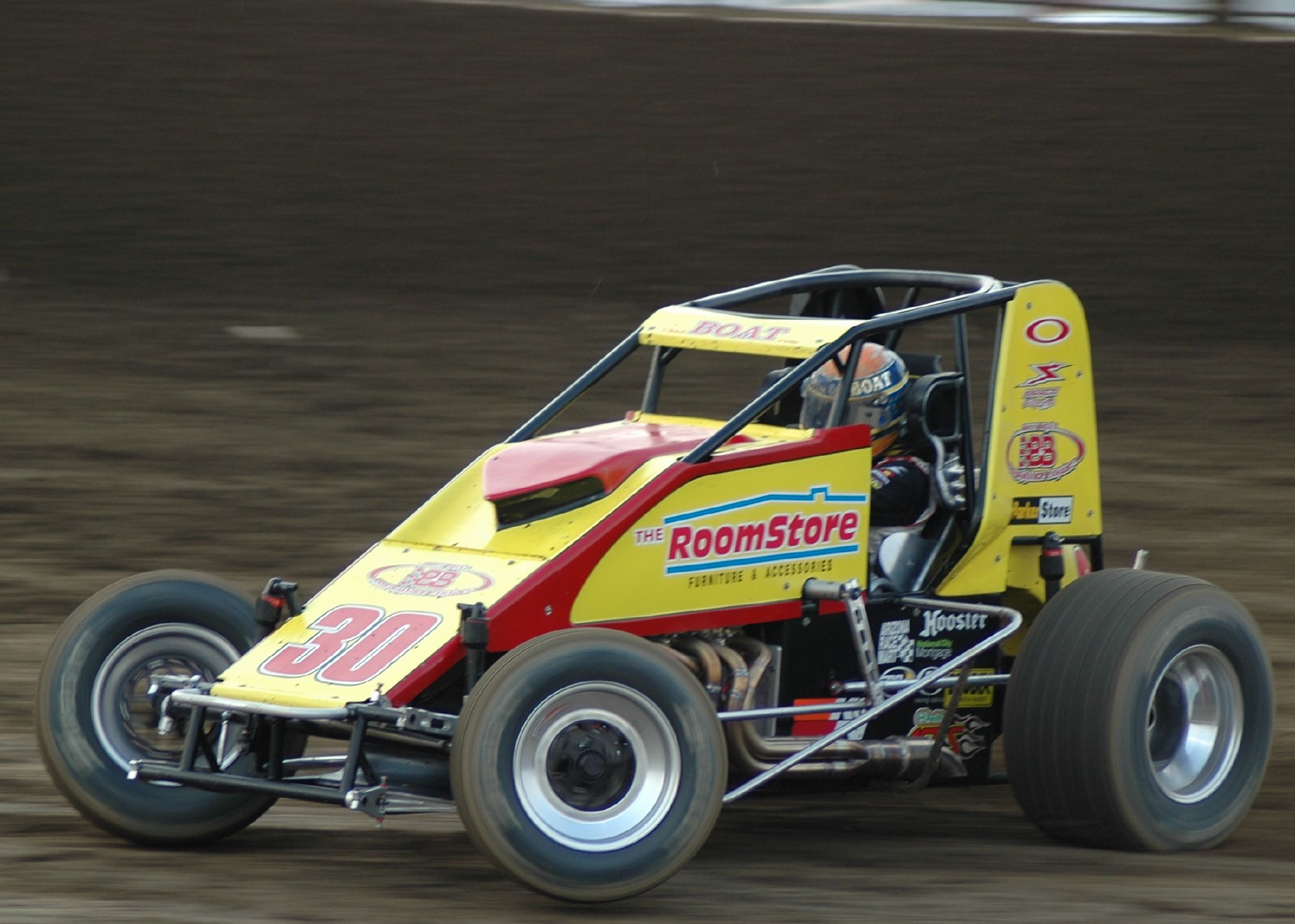
Boat racing in a USAC Sprint car, 2007

=== Sprint cars and midgets ===
Boat began his racing career in quarter midgets at the age of five. At age seven, he won the Arizona state quarter midget championship, and the following year won the Light Modified and Light 160 midget championships.

=== Stock cars ===
After competing in USAC competition, Boat moved to NASCAR in 2010, running in seven K&N Pro Series West events between 2010 and 2012, with a best finish of fourth in 2010 at Iowa Speedway; he also ran 19 K&N Pro Series East events with a best finish of ninth at Bowman Gray Stadium in 2011. Boat also competed in ten ARCA Racing Series events in 2012 and 2013, posting third-place finishes twice at Iowa.

In January 2014, Boat announced that he would be competing for Rookie of the Year in the Nationwide Series in 2014, running fifteen events for family-owned Billy Boat Motorsports. Boat finished 29th in points with a best finish of 22nd at Iowa Speedway. In 2015, he raced in both the Xfinity (formerly Nationwide) Series and Camping World Truck Series for Billy Boat Motorsports. He made three Xfinity starts and four Truck Series starts. He ran for the Truck Series championship and finished 38th in points with a best finish of ninth at Talladega Superspeedway, his best NASCAR finish to date.

=== Indy Lights ===
On June 27, 2017, it was announced that Boat would compete in the Indy Lights series with Belardi Auto Racing competing at the oval events at Iowa Speedway and Gateway Motorsports Park in the latter half of the 2017 season. Chad's father Billy also competed in Indy Lights, then called the American Racing Series, in 1986 and 1987.

=== Team ownership ===
Boat co-owned a USAC National Midget car team Tucker/Boat Motorsports and the team won the 2020 championship in their first season with driver Chris Windom. With the championship, Boat became the first person who had won a USAC National Midget race to own the season-championship-winning car with another driver.

== Personal life ==
Boat attended University of North Carolina at Charlotte, majoring in finance.

Boat married Casey Haimes on January 26, 2019. Casey was a co-host of the podcast Door Bumper Clear on Dirty Mo Media. The couple has two daughters, Chloe, who was born in 2020 and Carter, who was born in 2024.

== Motorsports career results ==
=== NASCAR ===
(key) (Bold – Pole position awarded by qualifying time. Italics – Pole position earned by points standings or practice time. * – Most laps led.)

==== Xfinity Series ====
NASCAR Xfinity Series results
Year	Team	No.	Make	1	2	3	4	5	6	7	8	9	10	11	12	13	14	15	16	17	18	19	20	21	22	23	24	25	26	27	28	29	30	31	32	33	NXSC	Pts	Ref
2014	Billy Boat Motorsports	84	Chevy	DAY; 24	PHO	LVS	BRI	CAL	TEX; 31	DAR	RCH	TAL; DNQ	IOW; 29	CLT; 26	DOV	MCH	ROA	KEN; DNQ	DAY; 26	NHA	CHI; 28	IND; 27	IOW; 22	GLN	MOH	BRI; 37	ATL	RCH; 34	CHI	KEN	DOV	KAN	CLT; 28	TEX; 28	PHO; 25	HOM	29th	227	
2014	Billy Boat Motorsports	17	Chevy									TAL; 25																									29th	227	
2015	Billy Boat Motorsports	84	Chevy	DAY; 36	ATL	LVS	PHO	CAL	TEX	BRI	RCH	TAL; 35	IOW	CLT; 25	DOV	MCH	CHI	DAY	KEN	NHA	IND	IOW	GLN	MOH	BRI	ROA	DAR	RCH	CHI	KEN	DOV	CLT	KAN	TEX	PHO	HOM	105th	0^{1}	

==== Camping World Truck Series ====
NASCAR Camping World Truck Series results
Year	Team	No.	Make	1	2	3	4	5	6	7	8	9	10	11	12	13	14	15	16	17	18	19	20	21	22	23	NCWTC	Pts	Ref
2015	Billy Boat Motorsports	15	Chevy	DAY	ATL	MAR	KAN	CLT	DOV	TEX	GTW	IOW	KEN	ELD; 31	POC	MCH	BRI	MSP									38th	99	
2015	Billy Boat Motorsports	16	Chevy																CHI; DNQ	NHA	LVS; 25	TAL; 9	MAR	TEX	PHO; 12	HOM	38th	99	

==== K&N Pro Series East ====
NASCAR K&N Pro Series East results
Year	Team	No.	Make	1	2	3	4	5	6	7	8	9	10	11	12	13	14	NKNPSEC	Pts	Ref
2010	Billy Boat Motorsports	36	Chevy	GRE	SBO	IOW	MAR	NHA	LRP	LEE	JFC	NHA; 17	DOV					55th	112	
2011	Curb Racing	98	Chevy	GRE; 23	SBO; 20	RCH; 21	IOW; 11	BGS; 9	JFC; 30	LGY; 14	NHA; 15	COL; 12	GRE; 28	NHA; 20	DOV; 27			16th	1278	
2012	Curb Racing	98	Chevy	BRI; 34	GRE; 26	RCH; 31	IOW; 11	BGS	JFC; 29	LGY	CNB	COL	IOW; 15	NHA	DOV	GRE	CAR	27th	118	

==== K&N Pro Series West ====
NASCAR K&N Pro Series West results
Year	Team	No.	Make	1	2	3	4	5	6	7	8	9	10	11	12	13	14	15	NKNPSWC	Pts	Ref
2010	Billy Boat Motorsports	36	Chevy	AAS	PHO	IOW; 4	DCS	SON											34th	303	
2010	Billy Boat Motorsports	30	Chevy						IRW; 17	PIR	MRP	CNS	MMP	AAS	PHO; DNQ				34th	303	
2011	Curb Racing	98	Chevy	PHO; 11	AAS	MMP	IOW	LVS	SON	IRW	EVG	PIR	CNS; 7	MRP	SPO	AAS; 5	PHO; 7		22nd	577	
2012	Curb Racing	98	Chevy	PHO; 7	LHC	MMP	S99	IOW	BIR	LVS	SON	EVG	CNS	IOW	PIR	SMP	AAS	PHO	58th	37	

=== ARCA Racing Series ===
(key) (Bold – Pole position awarded by qualifying time. Italics – Pole position earned by points standings or practice time. * – Most laps led.)

ARCA Racing Series results
Year	Team	No.	Make	1	2	3	4	5	6	7	8	9	10	11	12	13	14	15	16	17	18	19	20	21	ARSC	Pts	Ref
2012	Curb Racing	98	Chevy	DAY	MOB	SLM	TAL	TOL	ELK	POC	MCH	WIN	NJE	IOW; 3	CHI	IRP; 8	POC	BLN	ISF	MAD	SLM	DSF			48th	455	
2012	Ken Schrader Racing	52	Chevy																				KAN; 37		48th	455	
2013	Curb Racing	52	Chevy	DAY; 10	MOB	SLM	TAL	TOL	ELK	POC															18th	1430	
2013	Venturini Motorsports	55	Toyota								MCH; 15	ROA	WIN												18th	1430	
2013	Billy Boat Motorsports	84	Toyota											CHI; 5	NJE	POC; 30	BLN	ISF	MAD	DSF	IOW; 3*	SLM	KEN; 5	KAN; 23	18th	1430	

^{*} Season still in progress
^{1} Ineligible for series points

=== Indy Lights ===
Year	Team	1	2	3	4	5	6	7	8	9	10	11	12	13	14	15	16	Rank	Points
2017	Belardi Auto Racing	STP	STP	ALA	ALA	IMS	IMS	INDY	RDA	RDA	IOW	TOR	TOR	MOH	MOH	GMP; 14	WGL	16th	7
