= Billy Boat Motorsports =

Former NASCAR team

- Owner: Billy Boat
- Base: Mooresville, North Carolina
- Series: Xfinity Series; Camping World Truck Series
- Race drivers: Xfinity Series: 84. Chad Boat; Camping World Truck Series: 15. Mason Mingus; 16. Chad Boat
- Manufacturer: Chevrolet
- Opened: 2014
- Closed: 2015

Career
- Debut: Xfinity Series: 2014 DRIVE4COPD 300 (Daytona); Camping World Truck Series: 2014 Rhino Linings 350 (Las Vegas)
- Latest race: Xfinity Series: 2015 Hisense 300 (Charlotte); Camping World Truck Series: 2015 Ford EcoBoost 200 (Homestead)
- Races competed: Total: 35; Xfinity Series: 16; Camping World Truck Series: 28
- Drivers' Championships: Total: 0 Xfinity Series: 0 Camping World Truck Series: 0
- Race victories: Total: 0 Xfinity Series: 0 Camping World Truck Series: 0
- Pole positions: Total: 0 Xfinity Series: 0 Camping World Truck Series: 0

Billy Boat Motorsports was an American professional stock car racing team that last competed in the NASCAR Xfinity Series, and the Camping World Truck Series. The team was owned by former IndyCar Series driver Billy Boat. Founded in 2014 and based in Mooresville, North Carolina, the team fielded the No. 84 CorvetteParts.net Chevrolet Camaro for Chad Boat part-time in the NASCAR Xfinity Series, and the No. 15 811 Call Before You Dig Chevrolet Silverado for Mason Mingus full-time in the NASCAR Camping World Truck Series.

== History ==
The team began racing in the K&N Pro Series East and West in 2010 with Billy Boat's son Chad Boat, expanding to the ARCA Racing Series for 2012 and 2013. The team expanded into the national series of NASCAR in 2014.

The team receives engines from ECR Engines.

== Xfinity Series ==
=== Car No. 84 history ===
On January 7, 2014, team announced that driver Chad Boat, son of owner Billy Boat, would compete with the No. 84 Chevrolet Camaro in the 2014 NASCAR Nationwide Series season, attempting 15 races in its debut season with sponsorship from Keen Parts/CorvetteParts.net. Boat qualified for 13 of his 15 attempts, running the No. 17 for Vision Racing at Talladega after failing to qualify. Boat had a best finish of 24th at Daytona in February.

Boat returned part-time in 2015, with sponsor Keen Parts renewing their partnership.

==== Car No. 84 results ====
NASCAR Xfinity Series results
Year	Driver	No.	Make	1	2	3	4	5	6	7	8	9	10	11	12	13	14	15	16	17	18	19	20	21	22	23	24	25	26	27	28	29	30	31	32	33	Owners	Pts
2014	Chad Boat	84	Chevy	DAY; 24	PHO	LVS	BRI	CAL	TEX; 31	DAR	RCH	TAL; DNQ	IOW; 29	CLT; 26	DOV	MCH	ROA	KEN; DNQ	DAY; 26	NHA	CHI; 28	IND; 27	IOW; 22	GLN	MOH	BRI; 37	ATL	RCH; 34	CHI	KEN	DOV	KAN	CLT; 28	TEX; 28	PHO; 25	HOM	40th	208
2014	Chad Boat	17	Chevy									TAL; 25																									40th	208
2015	Chad Boat	84	Chevy	DAY; 36	ATL	LVS	PHO	CAL	TEX	BRI	RCH	TAL; 35	IOW	CLT; 25	DOV	MCH	CHI	DAY	KEN	NHA	IND	IOW	GLN	MOH	BRI	ROA	DAR	RCH	CHI	KEN	DOV	CLT	KAN	TEX	PHO	HOM	48th	36

== Camping World Truck Series ==
=== Truck No. 15 history ===
The team announced on September 18, 2014, that it would field a No. 15 Chevrolet Silverado in the final six races of the 2014 NASCAR Camping World Truck Series schedule with rookie driver Mason Mingus, beginning with the Rhino Linings 350 at Las Vegas Motor Speedway. Mingus had run the previous 16 races in Win-Tron Racing's No. 35 Toyota Tundra with sponsor 811 Call Before You Dig. Mingus would finish 11th in points, with three top 15 finishes under BBM.

Mingus and 811 returned to the team in 2015. Mingus failed to qualify at Daytona, but earned his first top 10 finish with the team at Kansas. Chad Boat replaced Mingus for one race at Eldora to make his Camping World Truck Series debut, finishing 31st.

The team's owner points were sold to Tommy Joe Martins and Martins Motorsports in 2016.

==== Truck No. 15 results ====
NASCAR Camping World Truck Series results
Year	Driver	No.	Make	1	2	3	4	5	6	7	8	9	10	11	12	13	14	15	16	17	18	19	20	21	22	23	Owners	Pts
2014	Mason Mingus	15	Chevy	DAY	MAR	KAN	CLT	DOV	TEX	GTW	KEN	IOW	ELD	POC	MCH	BRI	MSP	CHI	NHA	LVS; 18	TAL; 32	MAR; 15	TEX; 13	PHO; 13	HOM; 29		33rd	144
2015	Mason Mingus	15	Chevy	DAY; DNQ	ATL; 28	MAR; 22	KAN; 9	CLT; 26	DOV; 29	TEX; 13	GTW; 28	IOW; 16	KEN; 19		POC; 12	MCH; 24	BRI; 29	MSP; 14	CHI; 26	NHA; 14	LVS; 20	TAL; 3	MAR; 18	TEX; 18	PHO; 10	HOM; 20	18th	540
2015	Chad Boat	15	Chevy											ELD; 31													18th	540

=== Truck No. 16 history ===
In 2015, BBM ran a second truck numbered 16 part-time with Chad Boat. They attempted four late season races beginning at Chicagoland in September. They made three races, with qualifying cancelled at Chicago, and Boat had a best finish of 9th at Talladega.

==== Truck No. 16 results ====
NASCAR Camping World Truck Series results
Year	Driver	No.	Make	1	2	3	4	5	6	7	8	9	10	11	12	13	14	15	16	17	18	19	20	21	22	23	Owners	Pts
2015	Chad Boat	16	Chevy	DAY	ATL	MAR	KAN	CLT	DOV	TEX	GTW	IOW	KEN	ELD	POC	MCH	BRI	MSP	CHI; DNQ	NHA	LVS; 25	TAL; 9	MAR	TEX	PHO; 12	HOM	39th	86
