= NASCAR Xfinity Series at Auto Club Speedway =

NASCAR Xfinity Series race at California Speedway

NASCAR Xfinity Series
- Venue: California Speedway
- Location: Fontana, California, United States
- First race: 1997
- Last race: 2023
- Distance: 300 miles (480 km)
- Laps: 150; Stages 1/2: 35 each Final stage: 80
- Previous names: Kenwood Home & Car Audio 300 (1997–1998); Auto Club 300 (1999–2002); 1-800-Pitshop.com 300 (2003); Stater Brothers 300 Presented by Gatorade (2004); Stater Brothers 300 (2005–2010); Royal Purple 300 (2011–2013); Treatmyclot.com 300 (2014); Drive4Clots.com 300 (2015); Treatmyclot.com 300 by Janssen (2016); Service King 300 (2017); Roseanne 300 (2018); Production Alliance Group 300 (2019-2020, 2022-2023); Former second race: Target House 300 (2004); Ameriquest 300 (2005–2006); Camping World 300 Presented by RVs.com (2007); Camping World RV Service 300 Presented by Coleman (2008); Copart 300 (2009); CampingWorld.com 300 (2010)
- Most wins (driver): Kyle Busch (6)
- Most wins (team): Joe Gibbs Racing (11)
- Most wins (manufacturer): Ford; Toyota (11)

Circuit information
- Surface: Asphalt
- Length: 2.0 mi (3.2 km)
- Turns: 4

Stock car races in the then-NASCAR Xfinity Series were held at Auto Club Speedway in Fontana, California from 1997 to 2023. The race was held as a 150 lap, 300 mile (480 km) race.

A second race at the track was also held during the fall as support to the Cup fall race from 2004 until the track lost its second Cup date after 2010.

No races have been held since 2023, as the track is currently undergoing demolition of the 2-mile oval.

== Past winners ==
Year	Date	No.	Driver	Team	Manufacturer	Race Distance		Race Time	Average Speed (mph)	Report	Ref
Year	Date	No.	Driver	Team	Manufacturer	Laps	Miles (km)	Race Time	Average Speed (mph)	Report	Ref
1997	October 19	36	Todd Bodine	Team 34	Pontiac	150	300 (482.803)	2:04:04	145.083	Report	
1998	July 19	3	Dale Earnhardt Jr.	Dale Earnhardt, Inc.	Chevrolet	150	300 (482.803)	2:01:09	148.576	Report	
1999	May 1	17	Matt Kenseth	Reiser Enterprises	Chevrolet	150	300 (482.803)	2:30:03	119.96	Report	
2000	April 29	17	Matt Kenseth	Reiser Enterprises	Chevrolet	150	300 (482.803)	2:22:25	126.375	Report	
2001	April 28	36	Hank Parker Jr.	Cicci-Welliver Racing	Chevrolet	150	300 (482.803)	1:55:25	155.957	Report	
2002	April 27	10	Scott Riggs	ppc Racing	Ford	150	300 (482.803)	2:16:59	131.403	Report	
2003	April 26	17	Matt Kenseth	Reiser Enterprises	Ford	150	300 (482.803)	2:19:05	129.419	Report	
2004	May 1	60	Greg Biffle	Roush Racing	Ford	150	300 (482.803)	2:09:31	138.978	Report	
2004	September 4	60	Greg Biffle	Roush Racing	Ford	150	300 (482.803)	2:01:45	147.844	Report	
2005	February 26	9	Mark Martin	Roush Racing	Ford	150	300 (482.803)	2:33:31	117.251	Report	
2005	September 3	60	Carl Edwards	Roush Racing	Ford	150	300 (482.803)	2:09:24	139.104	Report	
2006	February 25	16	Greg Biffle	Roush Racing	Ford	150	300 (482.803)	2:02:02	147.501	Report	
2006	September 2	9	Kasey Kahne	Evernham Motorsports	Dodge	150	300 (482.803)	2:12:26	135.917	Report	
2007	February 24	17	Matt Kenseth	Roush Fenway Racing	Ford	150	300 (482.803)	2:20:46	127.871	Report	
2007	September 1	29	Jeff Burton	Richard Childress Racing	Chevrolet	150	300 (482.803)	2:21:02	127.629	Report	
2008	February 25*	20	Tony Stewart	Joe Gibbs Racing	Toyota	150	300 (482.803)	2:06:58	141.769	Report	
2008	August 30	18	Kyle Busch	Joe Gibbs Racing	Toyota	150	300 (482.803)	2:04:49	144.212	Report	
2009	February 21	18	Kyle Busch	Joe Gibbs Racing	Toyota	150	300 (482.803)	2:11:13	137.178	Report	
2009	October 10	20	Joey Logano	Joe Gibbs Racing	Toyota	152*	304 (489.24)	2:29:17	122.184	Report	
2010	February 20	18	Kyle Busch	Joe Gibbs Racing	Toyota	152*	304 (489.24)	2:06:46	143.886	Report	
2010	October 9	18	Kyle Busch	Joe Gibbs Racing	Toyota	150	300 (482.803)	2:25:33	123.669	Report	
2011	March 26	18	Kyle Busch	Joe Gibbs Racing	Toyota	150	300 (482.803)	2:07:52	140.772	Report	
2012	March 24	18	Joey Logano	Joe Gibbs Racing	Toyota	150	300 (482.803)	2:06:28	142.33	Report	
2013	March 23	54	Kyle Busch	Joe Gibbs Racing	Toyota	150	300 (482.803)	2:07:11	141.528	Report	
2014	March 22	42	Kyle Larson	Turner Scott Motorsports	Chevrolet	150	300 (482.803)	2:05:03	143.942	Report	
2015	March 21	88	Kevin Harvick	JR Motorsports	Chevrolet	150	300 (482.803)	2:01:51	147.723	Report	
2016	March 19	2	Austin Dillon	Richard Childress Racing	Chevrolet	150	300 (482.803)	2:05:52	143.008	Report	
2017	March 25	42	Kyle Larson	Chip Ganassi Racing	Chevrolet	150	300 (482.803)	2:34:00	116.883	Report	
2018	March 17	22	Joey Logano	Team Penske	Ford	150	300 (482.803)	2:21:25	127.283	Report	
2019	March 16	00	Cole Custer	Stewart–Haas Racing with Biagi-DenBeste	Ford	150	300 (482.803)	2:17:43	130.703	Report	
2020	February 29	20	Harrison Burton	Joe Gibbs Racing	Toyota	150	300 (482.803)	2:28:15	121.417	Report	
2021*	February 27	Canceled and replaced by 2021 Super Start Batteries 188.									
2022	February 26	07	Cole Custer	SS-Green Light Racing	Ford	165*	330 (531.083)	3:05:05	105.682	Report	
2023	February 26*	20	John Hunter Nemechek	Joe Gibbs Racing	Toyota	150	300 (482.803)	2:35:53	115.471	Report	

=== Notes ===
- 2008 I: Race postponed from Saturday night to Monday afternoon due to rain.
- 2009 II, 2010 I and 2022: Race extended due to NASCAR overtime.
- 2021: Race canceled and moved to the Daytona road course due to the COVID-19 pandemic.
- 2023: Race postponed from Saturday afternoon to Sunday night due to rain.

== Multiple winners ==
=== Drivers ===
# Wins	Driver	Years won
6	Kyle Busch	Spring: 2009–2011, 2013; Fall: 2008, 2010
4	Matt Kenseth	Spring: 1999–2000, 2003, 2007
3	Greg Biffle	Spring: 2004, 2006; Fall: 2004
3	Joey Logano	Spring: 2012, 2018; Fall: 2009
2	Kyle Larson	Spring: 2014, 2017
2	Cole Custer	Spring: 2019, 2022

=== Teams ===
# Wins	Team	Years won
11	Joe Gibbs Racing	Spring: 2008–2013, 2020, 2023; Fall: 2008–2010
6	RFK Racing	Spring: 2004–2007; Fall: 2004–2005
3	Reiser Enterprises	Spring: 1999–2000, 2003
2	Cicci-Welliver Racing	Spring: 1997, 2001
2	Richard Childress Racing	Spring: 2016; Fall: 2007

=== Manufacturer wins ===
# Wins	Make	Years won
11	Ford	Spring: 2002–2007, 2018–2019, 2022; Fall: 2004–2005
11	Toyota	Spring: 2008–2013, 2020, 2023; Fall: 2008–2010
9	Chevrolet	Spring: 1998–2001, 2014–2017; Fall: 2007
1	Pontiac	Spring: 1997
1	Dodge	Fall: 2006
