= 2014 NASCAR Nationwide Series =

American motorsport season

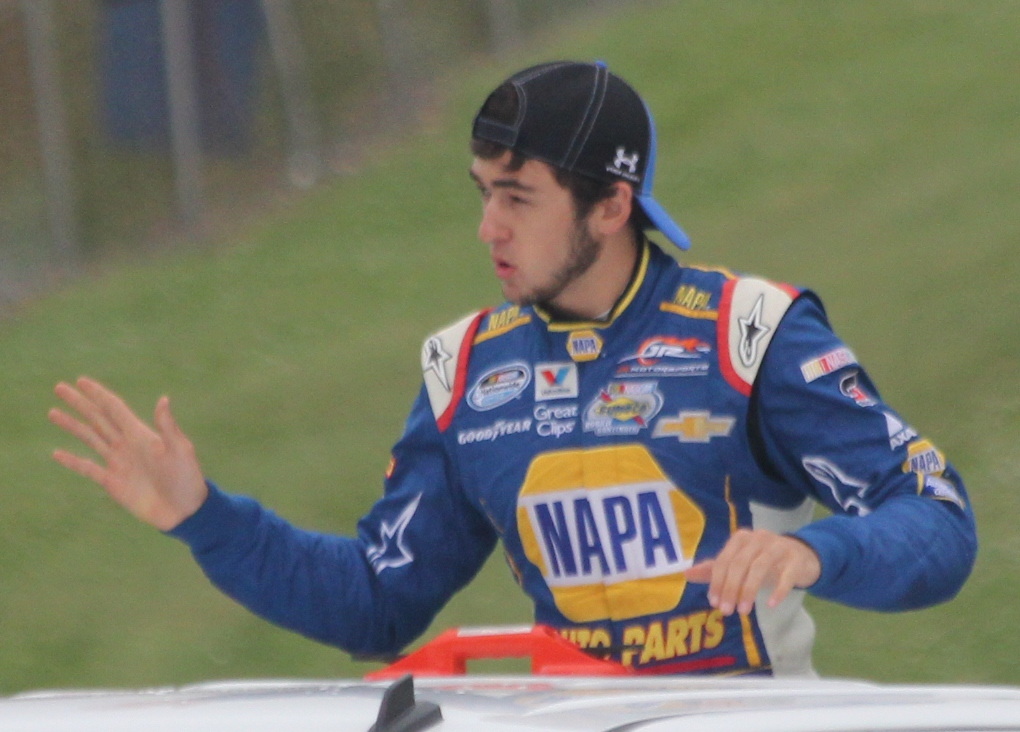
Chase Elliott, the 2014 Nationwide Series champion & 2014 Nationwide Series Rookie of the Year.

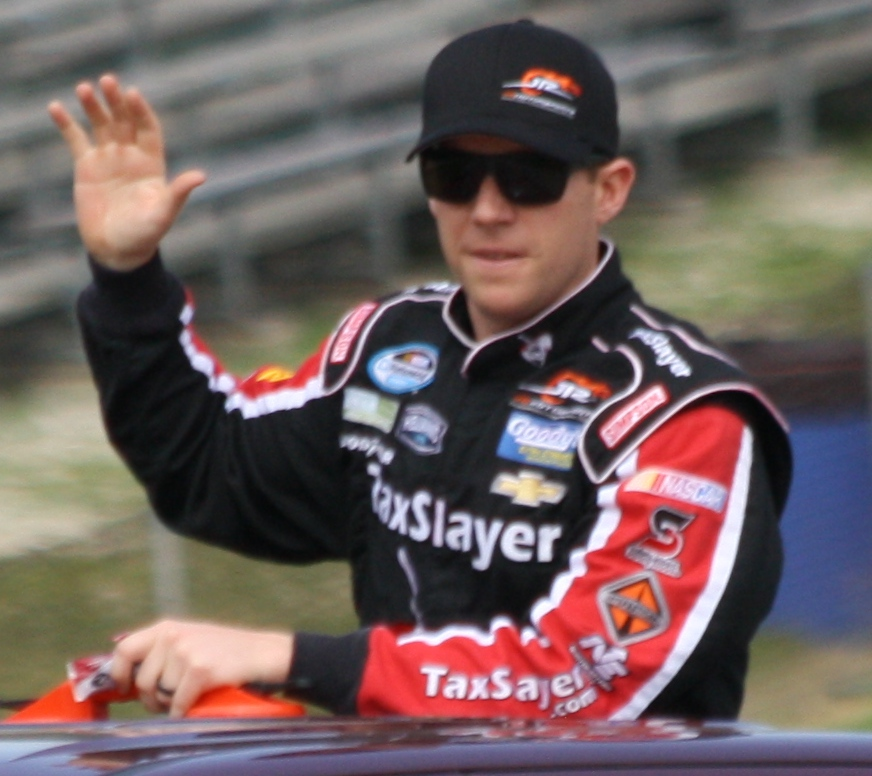
Regan Smith finished second behind his teammate Elliott in the championship by 42 points.

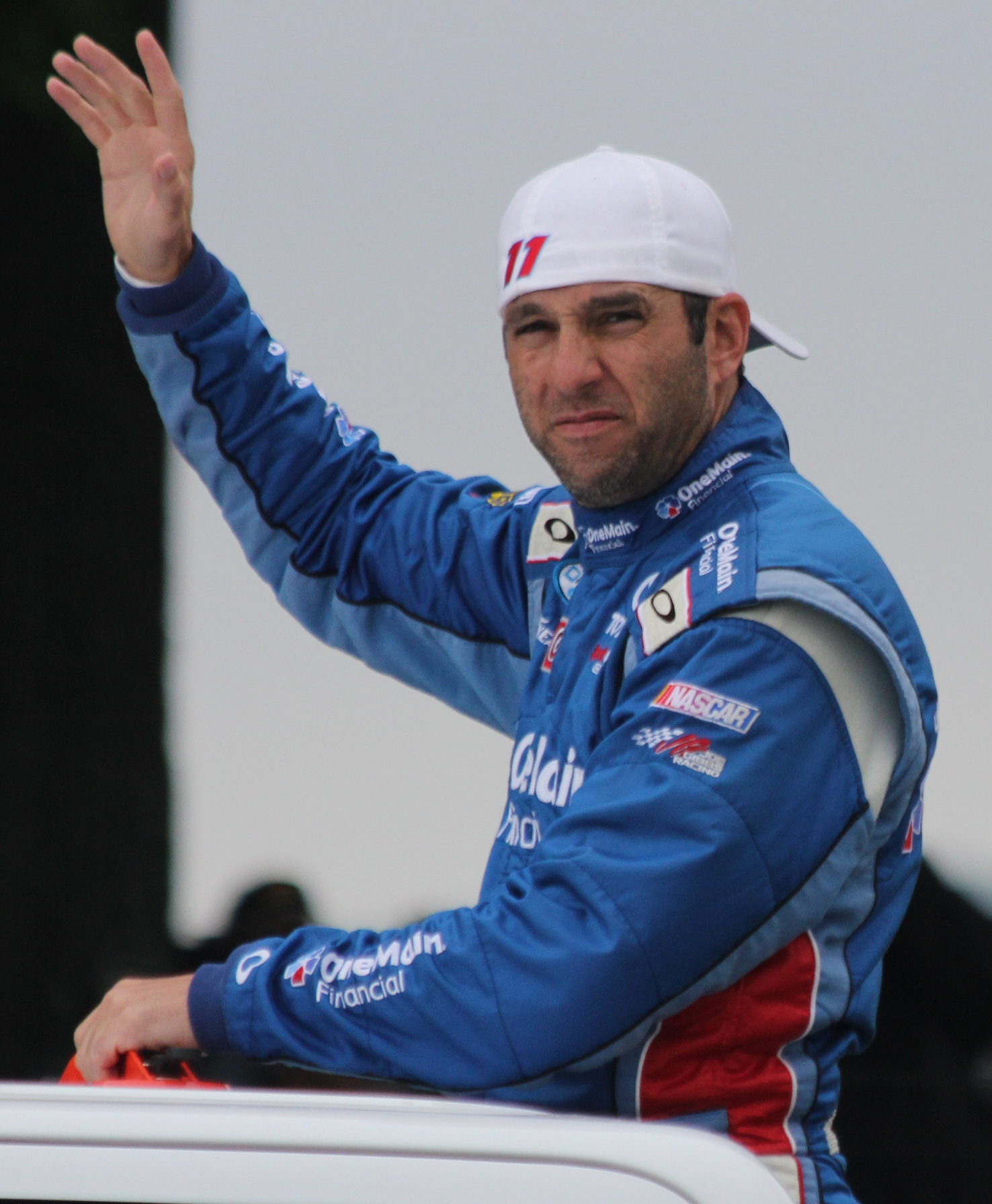
Elliott Sadler finished third in the championship, 59 points behind Elliott.

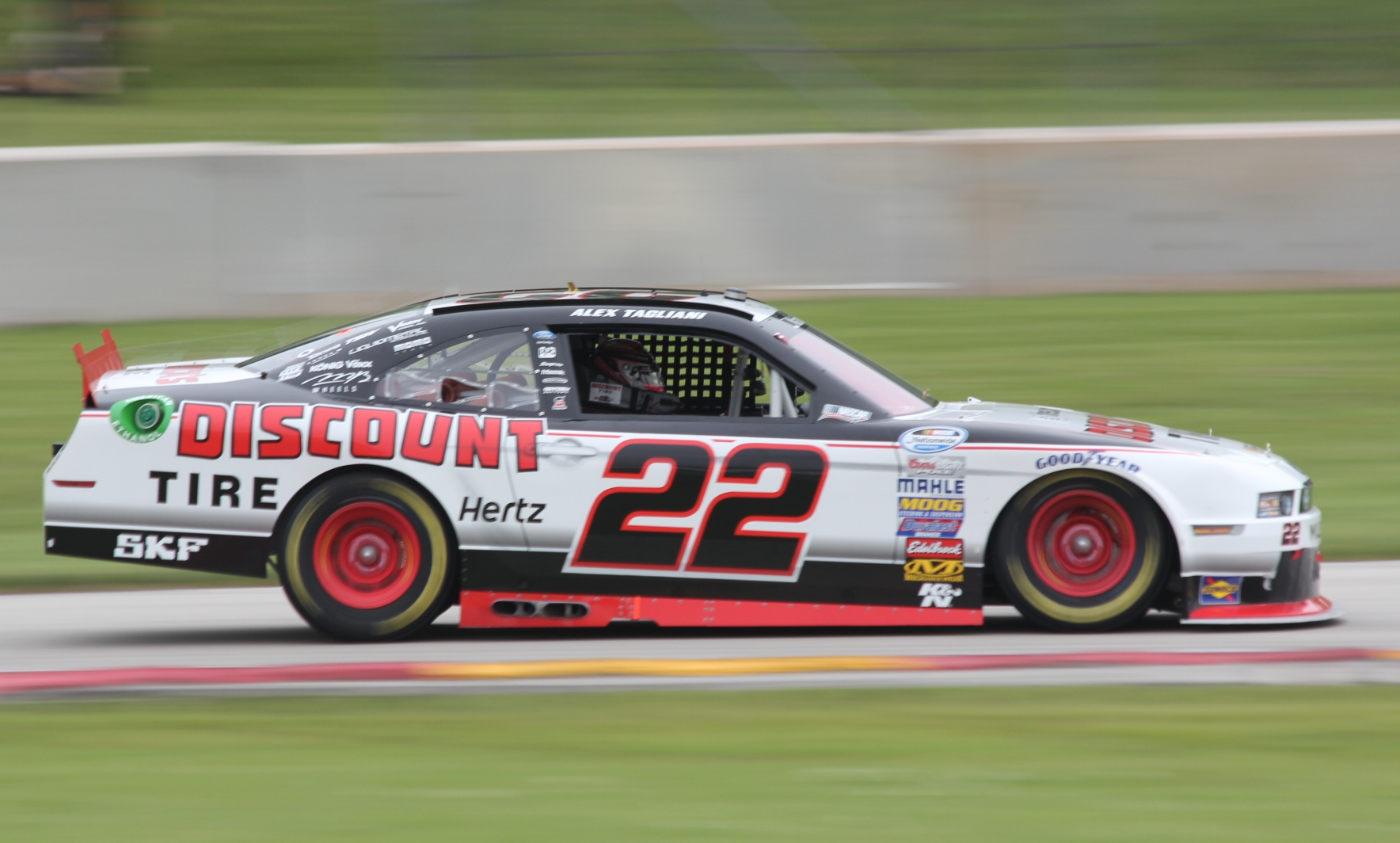
The No. 22 car for Team Penske won the owner's championship with 1347 points and five different drivers.

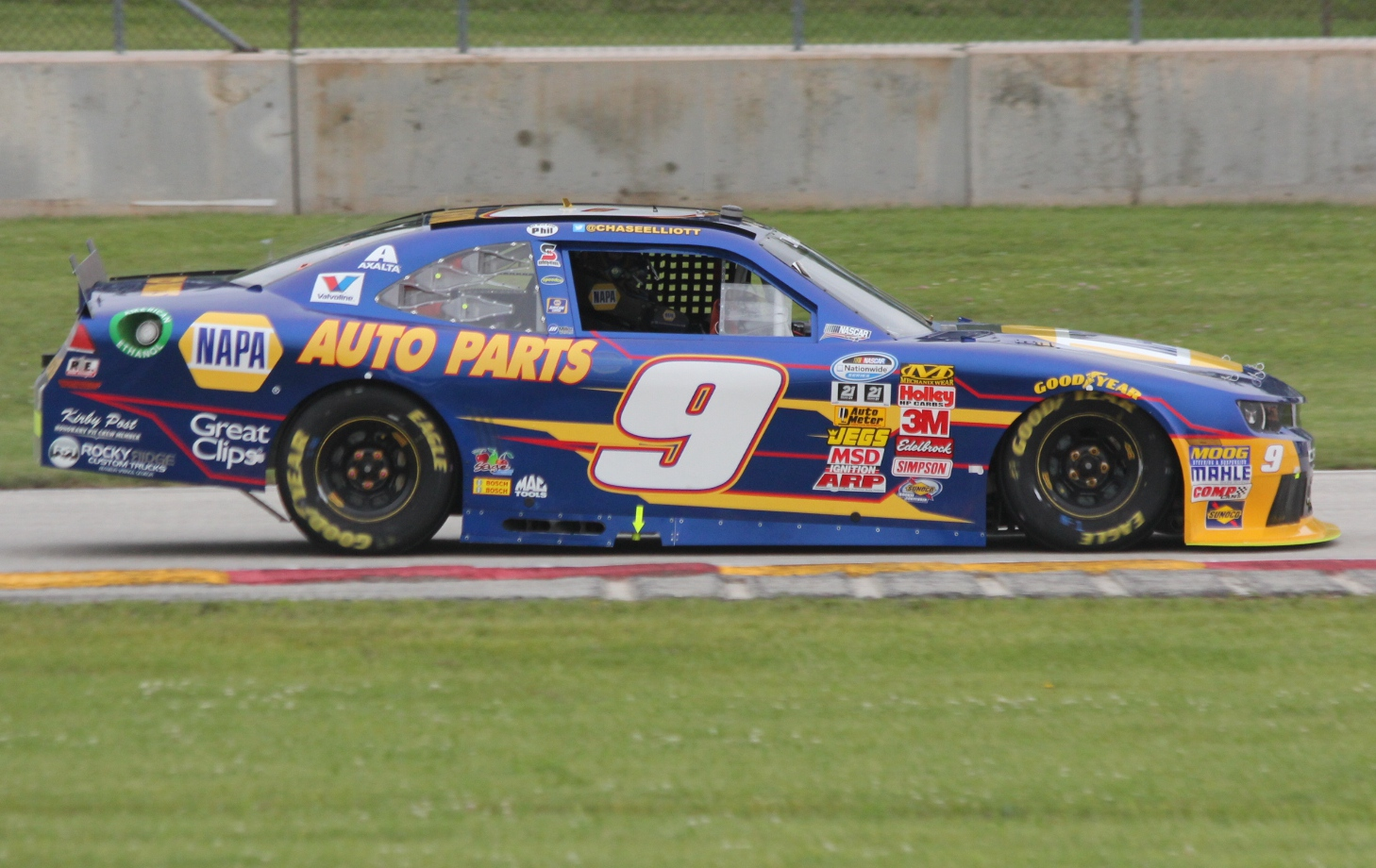
Chevy won the manufacturer's championship with 15 wins and 1,452 points.

The 2014 NASCAR Nationwide Series was the 33rd season of the NASCAR Nationwide Series, the second national professional stock car racing series sanctioned by NASCAR in the United States. It began with the DRIVE4COPD 300 at Daytona International Speedway on February 22, and ended with the Ford EcoBoost 300 at Homestead–Miami Speedway on November 15. This was also the final year that the Nationwide Mutual Insurance Company sponsored the series, opting for increased involvement in the Sprint Cup Series, as well as the final season the series was broadcast by ESPN. Ford entered the season as the defending Manufacturer's Champion. After 2014, Xfinity became the series sponsor.

== Teams and drivers ==
=== Complete schedule ===
Team	Manufacturer	No.	Driver	Crew Chief
Derrike Cope Racing	Chevrolet	70	Derrike Cope	Fred Wanke 22; Elaine Hughes 1 Bobby Burrell 10
JD Motorsports	Chevrolet	01	Landon Cassill	Dave Fuge 31; Ricky Viers 2
JD Motorsports	Chevrolet	4	Jeffrey Earnhardt	Ricky Viers 9 Randy MacDonald 2 Gary Cogswell 22
Jeremy Clements Racing	Chevrolet	51	Jeremy Clements	Ricky Pearson
JGL Racing	Dodge 32; Toyota 1	28	Mike Wallace 5	Dave Goulet 7 Steve Plattenberger 26
JGL Racing	Dodge 32; Toyota 1	28	Derek White 1	Dave Goulet 7 Steve Plattenberger 26
JGL Racing	Dodge 32; Toyota 1	28	J. J. Yeley 27	Dave Goulet 7 Steve Plattenberger 26
JGL Racing	Dodge	93	Matt Carter 1	Steve Plattenberger 7 Dave Goulet 20; Gregg Mixon 3 Ken Evans 3
JGL Racing	Dodge	93	Carl Long 4	Steve Plattenberger 7 Dave Goulet 20; Gregg Mixon 3 Ken Evans 3
JGL Racing	Dodge	93	J. J. Yeley 3	Steve Plattenberger 7 Dave Goulet 20; Gregg Mixon 3 Ken Evans 3
JGL Racing	Dodge	93	Mike Wallace 4	Steve Plattenberger 7 Dave Goulet 20; Gregg Mixon 3 Ken Evans 3
JGL Racing	Dodge	93	Harrison Rhodes 2	Steve Plattenberger 7 Dave Goulet 20; Gregg Mixon 3 Ken Evans 3
JGL Racing	Dodge	93	Josh Reaume 1	Steve Plattenberger 7 Dave Goulet 20; Gregg Mixon 3 Ken Evans 3
JGL Racing	Dodge	93	Kevin Lepage 1	Steve Plattenberger 7 Dave Goulet 20; Gregg Mixon 3 Ken Evans 3
JGL Racing	Dodge	93	Ryan Ellis 2	Steve Plattenberger 7 Dave Goulet 20; Gregg Mixon 3 Ken Evans 3
JGL Racing	Dodge	93	Mike Harmon 1	Steve Plattenberger 7 Dave Goulet 20; Gregg Mixon 3 Ken Evans 3
JGL Racing	Dodge	93	Kevin Swindell 10	Steve Plattenberger 7 Dave Goulet 20; Gregg Mixon 3 Ken Evans 3
JGL Racing	Dodge	93	Tomy Drissi 2	Steve Plattenberger 7 Dave Goulet 20; Gregg Mixon 3 Ken Evans 3
JGL Racing	Dodge	93	T. J. Bell 2	Steve Plattenberger 7 Dave Goulet 20; Gregg Mixon 3 Ken Evans 3
Jimmy Means Racing	Chevrolet 31; Toyota 2	52	Joey Gase	Timothy Brown
Joe Gibbs Racing	Toyota	11	Elliott Sadler	Chris Gayle
Joe Gibbs Racing	Toyota	20	Matt Kenseth 19	Kevin Kidd
Joe Gibbs Racing	Toyota	20	Daniel Suárez 1	Kevin Kidd
Joe Gibbs Racing	Toyota	20	Bubba Wallace 2	Kevin Kidd
Joe Gibbs Racing	Toyota	20	Michael McDowell 2	Kevin Kidd
Joe Gibbs Racing	Toyota	20	Sam Hornish Jr. 1	Kevin Kidd
Joe Gibbs Racing	Toyota	20	Kenny Habul 2	Kevin Kidd
Joe Gibbs Racing	Toyota	20	Erik Jones 3	Kevin Kidd
Joe Gibbs Racing	Toyota	20	Denny Hamlin 1	Kevin Kidd
Joe Gibbs Racing	Toyota	20	Justin Boston 2	Kevin Kidd
Joe Gibbs Racing	Toyota	54	Kyle Busch 26	Adam Stevens
Joe Gibbs Racing	Toyota	54	Sam Hornish Jr. 7	Adam Stevens
JR Motorsports	Chevrolet	7	Regan Smith	Ryan Pemberton
JR Motorsports	Chevrolet	9	Chase Elliott (R)	Greg Ives 32; Ernie Cope 1
Mike Harmon Racing	Dodge 29; Chevrolet 4	74	Mike Harmon 18	Harry McMullen 1 Gary Ritter 30; Robert White 1 Scott Stolzenberg 1
Mike Harmon Racing	Dodge 29; Chevrolet 4	74	Kevin Lepage 11	Harry McMullen 1 Gary Ritter 30; Robert White 1 Scott Stolzenberg 1
Mike Harmon Racing	Dodge 29; Chevrolet 4	74	Bobby Reuse 2	Harry McMullen 1 Gary Ritter 30; Robert White 1 Scott Stolzenberg 1
Mike Harmon Racing	Dodge 29; Chevrolet 4	74	Roger Reuse 1	Harry McMullen 1 Gary Ritter 30; Robert White 1 Scott Stolzenberg 1
Mike Harmon Racing	Dodge 29; Chevrolet 4	74	Mike Wallace 1	Harry McMullen 1 Gary Ritter 30; Robert White 1 Scott Stolzenberg 1
NEMCO-Jay Robinson Racing	Toyota	87	Joe Nemechek 4	Steven Gray
JD Motorsports	Chevrolet	87	Daryl Harr 3	Carl Harr
JD Motorsports	Chevrolet	87	Kevin Lepage 3	Johnny Davis 1 Rick Markle 1 Randy MacDonald 3 James Cooley 2 Steven Gray 17
JD Motorsports	Chevrolet	87	Tim Schendel 1	Johnny Davis 1 Rick Markle 1 Randy MacDonald 3 James Cooley 2 Steven Gray 17
Rick Ware Racing	Chevrolet 15; Ford 6	87	Chris Cockrum 2	Johnny Davis 1 Rick Markle 1 Randy MacDonald 3 James Cooley 2 Steven Gray 17
Rick Ware Racing	Chevrolet 15; Ford 6	87	Tim Schendel 1	Johnny Davis 1 Rick Markle 1 Randy MacDonald 3 James Cooley 2 Steven Gray 17
Rick Ware Racing	Chevrolet 15; Ford 6	87	Stanton Barrett 3	Johnny Davis 1 Rick Markle 1 Randy MacDonald 3 James Cooley 2 Steven Gray 17
Rick Ware Racing	Chevrolet 15; Ford 6	87	Rubén García Jr. 1	Johnny Davis 1 Rick Markle 1 Randy MacDonald 3 James Cooley 2 Steven Gray 17
Rick Ware Racing	Chevrolet 15; Ford 6	87	Carlos Contreras 2	Johnny Davis 1 Rick Markle 1 Randy MacDonald 3 James Cooley 2 Steven Gray 17
Rick Ware Racing	Chevrolet 15; Ford 6	87	Josh Reaume 8	Johnny Davis 1 Rick Markle 1 Randy MacDonald 3 James Cooley 2 Steven Gray 17
Rick Ware Racing	Chevrolet 15; Ford 6	87	Timmy Hill 2	Johnny Davis 1 Rick Markle 1 Randy MacDonald 3 James Cooley 2 Steven Gray 17
Rick Ware Racing	Chevrolet 15; Ford 6	87	Jennifer Jo Cobb 1	Johnny Davis 1 Rick Markle 1 Randy MacDonald 3 James Cooley 2 Steven Gray 17
Rick Ware Racing	Chevrolet 15; Ford 6	87	Carl Long 1	Johnny Davis 1 Rick Markle 1 Randy MacDonald 3 James Cooley 2 Steven Gray 17
Mike Harmon Racing	Dodge	87	Mike Harmon 1 (Note: Mike Harmon drove in the Dover 200 with car number 87. Josh Reaume qualified for the race but crashed and his team didn't have a backup car for the race. Harmon, who did not qualify for the race, took over the number 87 and was able to start with his (previously 74) own's car entered Dodge.)	Gary Ritter
RAB Racing	Toyota	87	Milka Duno 1	Steven Gray
RAB Racing	Toyota	99	James Buescher	Chris Rice 14; Matt Lucas 19
Richard Childress Racing	Chevrolet	2	Brian Scott	Phil Gould
Richard Childress Racing	Chevrolet	3	Ty Dillon (R)	Danny Stockman Jr.
Richard Childress Racing	Chevrolet	62	Brendan Gaughan	Shane Wilson
R3 Motorsports	Chevrolet	23	Robert Richardson Jr. 7	George Church
Rick Ware Racing	Chevrolet	23	Carlos Contreras 9	George Church
Rick Ware Racing	Chevrolet	23	Timmy Hill 4	George Church
Rick Ware Racing	Chevrolet	23	Josh Reaume 2	George Church
Rick Ware Racing	Chevrolet	23	Ryan Ellis 1	George Church
Rick Ware Racing	Chevrolet	23	Kevin O'Connell 2	George Church
Rick Ware Racing	Chevrolet	23	Richard Harriman 1	George Church
Rick Ware Racing	Chevrolet	23	Carl Long 1	George Church
Rick Ware Racing	Chevrolet	23	Cody Ware 4	George Church
Rick Ware Racing	Chevrolet	23	Blake Koch 1	George Church
Rick Ware Racing	Chevrolet	23	Mackena Bell 1	George Church
Richard Petty Motorsports	Ford	43	Dakoda Armstrong (R)	Philippe Lopez
Roush Fenway Racing	Ford	6	Trevor Bayne	Chad Norris
Roush Fenway Racing	Ford	16	Ryan Reed (R)	Seth Barbour
Roush Fenway Racing	Ford	60	Chris Buescher (R)	Scott Graves
RSS Racing	Chevrolet	39	Ryan Sieg (R)	Kevin Starland
Team Penske	Ford	22	Brad Keselowski 11	Jeremy Bullins
Team Penske	Ford	22	Ryan Blaney 10	Jeremy Bullins
Team Penske	Ford	22	Joey Logano 9	Jeremy Bullins
Team Penske	Ford	22	Alex Tagliani 2	Jeremy Bullins
Team Penske	Ford	22	Michael McDowell 1	Jeremy Bullins
The Motorsports Group	Chevrolet	40	Josh Wise 16	Gary Showalter 27; Kyle Symington 6
The Motorsports Group	Chevrolet	40	Matt DiBenedetto 17	Gary Showalter 27; Kyle Symington 6
TriStar Motorsports	Toyota	14	Eric McClure 28	Wes Ward
TriStar Motorsports	Toyota	14	Jeff Green5	Wes Ward
TriStar Motorsports	Toyota	19	Mike Bliss 31	Paul Clapprood
TriStar Motorsports	Toyota	19	Hermie Sadler 2	Eddie Pardue
TriStar Motorsports	Toyota	44	Blake Koch 10	Greg Conner 31; Eddie Pardue 2
TriStar Motorsports	Toyota	44	Will Kimmel 5	Greg Conner 31; Eddie Pardue 2
TriStar Motorsports	Toyota	44	David Starr 11	Greg Conner 31; Eddie Pardue 2
TriStar Motorsports	Toyota	44	Hal Martin 2	Greg Conner 31; Eddie Pardue 2
TriStar Motorsports	Toyota	44	Paulie Harraka 1	Greg Conner 31; Eddie Pardue 2
TriStar Motorsports	Toyota	44	Carlos Contreras 3	Greg Conner 31; Eddie Pardue 2
TriStar Motorsports	Toyota	44	Matt Frahm 1	Greg Conner 31; Eddie Pardue 2
Turner Scott Motorsports	Chevrolet	31	Dylan Kwasniewski (R) 28	Pat Tryson 18; Shannon Rursch 15
Turner Scott Motorsports	Chevrolet	31	Chase Pistone 3	Pat Tryson 18; Shannon Rursch 15
Turner Scott Motorsports	Chevrolet	31	Justin Marks 2	Pat Tryson 18; Shannon Rursch 15
Turner Scott Motorsports	Chevrolet	42	Kyle Larson 28	Scott Zipadelli
Turner Scott Motorsports	Chevrolet	42	Dylan Kwasniewski (R) 5	Scott Zipadelli
Vision Racing	Dodge 28; Toyota 4	17	Tanner Berryhill (R) 32	Benny Gordon 7 Adrian Berryhill 5 Dan Stillman 21
Billy Boat Motorsports	Chevrolet	17	Chad Boat 1 (Note: Chad Boat drove in the Aaron's 312 with car number 17. Tanner Berryhill crashed in Qualifying and his team didn't have a backup car for the race. Boat, who did not qualify for the race, took over the number 17 and was able to start with his (previously 84) Billy Boat Motorsports entered Chevrolet.)	Benny Gordon 7 Adrian Berryhill 5 Dan Stillman 21
Viva Motorsports	Chevrolet	55	Jamie Dick 21	Bill Henderson 13; Micah Horton 1 Mark Durgin 2 Mark Setzer 6 Jimmy Dick 1
Viva Motorsports	Chevrolet	55	Ross Chastain 2	Bill Henderson 13; Micah Horton 1 Mark Durgin 2 Mark Setzer 6 Jimmy Dick 1
SS-Green Light Racing	Chevrolet	55	Todd Bodine 2	Jason Miller
SS-Green Light Racing	Chevrolet	55	Jimmy Weller III 1	Jason Miller
SS-Green Light Racing	Chevrolet	55	Caleb Roark 1	Jason Miller
SS-Green Light Racing	Chevrolet	55	Andy Lally 1	Jason Miller
SS-Green Light Racing	Chevrolet	55	Brennan Newberry 3	Jason Miller
SS-Green Light Racing	Chevrolet	55	Timmy Hill 1	Jason Miller
SS-Green Light Racing	Chevrolet	55	David Starr 1	Jason Miller

=== Limited schedule ===
Team	Manufacturer	No.	Race Driver	Crew Chief	Rounds
Athenian Motorsports	Toyota	25	John Wes Townley	Mike Beam; Mike Ford	11
Biagi-DenBeste Racing	Ford	98	David Ragan	Jon Hanson	7
Biagi-DenBeste Racing	Ford	98	Ryan Gifford	Jon Hanson	1
Biagi-DenBeste Racing	Ford	98	Jeb Burton	Jon Hanson	1
Biagi-DenBeste Racing	Ford	98	Corey LaJoie	Jon Hanson	5
Biagi-DenBeste Racing	Ford	98	Aric Almirola	Jon Hanson	2
Billy Boat Motorsports	Chevrolet	84	Chad Boat (R)	Dan Deeringhoff	15
Browning Motorsports	Chevrolet	26	Jake Crum	Marc Browning	1
DRG Motorsports	Chevrolet; Ford	86	Joe Nemechek	Rick Markle	1
DRG Motorsports	Chevrolet; Ford	86	Kyle Fowler	Rick Markle	1
DRG Motorsports	Chevrolet; Ford	86	Jake Crum	Rick Markle	3
DRG Motorsports	Chevrolet; Ford	86	Tim Cowen	Rick Markle	1
DGM Racing	Chevrolet	90	Martin Roy	Mario Gosselin	6
Gerhart Racing	Chevrolet	85	Bobby Gerhart	Billy Gerhart; Mark Skibo	3
Hattori Racing Enterprises	Toyota	80	Johnny Sauter	Bruce Cook	3
Hattori Racing Enterprises	Toyota	80	Ross Chastain	Bruce Cook	4
Hattori Racing Enterprises	Toyota	80	Alex Bowman	Bruce Cook	1
JR Motorsports	Chevrolet	5	Kevin Harvick	Ernie Cope	14
JR Motorsports	Chevrolet	5	Kasey Kahne	Ernie Cope	3
JR Motorsports	Chevrolet	5	Austin Theriault	Ernie Cope	3
JR Motorsports	Chevrolet	5	Josh Berry	Ernie Cope	2
JR Motorsports	Chevrolet	5	Alex Bowman	Ernie Cope	2
JR Motorsports	Chevrolet	88	Dale Earnhardt Jr.	Ernie Cope; Mike Bumgarner	4
JR Motorsports	Chevrolet	88	Kevin Harvick	Ernie Cope; Mike Bumgarner	1
Martins Motorsports	Dodge; Ford	67	Clay Greenfield	Todd Bodine	1
Martins Motorsports	Dodge; Ford	67	Benny Gordon	Joey Jones	1
Martins Motorsports	Dodge; Ford	67	Tommy Joe Martins (R)	Joey Jones	2
Martins Motorsports	Dodge; Ford	76	Willie Allen	Todd Perryman; Joey Jones; Tim Silva	2
Martins Motorsports	Dodge; Ford	76	Tommy Joe Martins (R)	Todd Perryman; Joey Jones; Tim Silva	14
MBM Motorsports	Toyota; Dodge	13	Carl Long	Kevin Eagle	7
MBM Motorsports	Toyota; Dodge	13	Matt Carter	Kevin Eagle	2
MBM Motorsports	Toyota; Dodge	13	Mike Wallace	Kevin Eagle	1
MBM Motorsports	Toyota; Dodge	13	Derek White	Kevin Eagle	1
MBM Motorsports	Chevrolet	72	Matt Carter	Mike Chance; Richard Garcia; Kevin Eagle	2
MBM Motorsports	Chevrolet	72	Harrison Rhodes	Mike Chance; Richard Garcia; Kevin Eagle	3
MBM Motorsports	Chevrolet	72	Carl Long	Mike Chance; Richard Garcia; Kevin Eagle	3
MBM Motorsports	Chevrolet	72	John Jackson	Mike Chance; Richard Garcia; Kevin Eagle	5
Jimmy Means Racing	Toyota	79	Carl Long	Jimmy Means	1
Jimmy Means Racing	Chevrolet	79	Tim Schendel	Mark Arellano	1
Jimmy Means Racing	Chevrolet	79	John Jackson	Corey Hill	1
Mike Harmon Racing	Dodge	77	Roger Reuse	Robert White	1
SS-Green Light Racing	Chevrolet	77	Jimmy Weller III	Jason Miller	1
SS-Green Light Racing	Chevrolet	77	Brennan Newberry	Jason Miller	1
NEMCO Motorsports	Toyota	97	Joe Nemechek	Steven Gray	1
RAB Racing	Toyota	29	Scott Lagasse Jr.	Matt Lucas; Chris Rice; Bruce Cook; Keith Hinkein	2
RAB Racing	Toyota	29	Kelly Admiraal	Matt Lucas; Chris Rice; Bruce Cook; Keith Hinkein	3
RAB Racing	Toyota	29	Kenny Wallace	Matt Lucas; Chris Rice; Bruce Cook; Keith Hinkein	1
RAB Racing	Toyota	29	Milka Duno	Matt Lucas; Chris Rice; Bruce Cook; Keith Hinkein	3
RAB Racing	Toyota	29	Daniel Suárez	Matt Lucas; Chris Rice; Bruce Cook; Keith Hinkein	1
Richard Childress Racing	Chevrolet	33	Matt Crafton	Nick Harrison	1
Richard Childress Racing	Chevrolet	33	Cale Conley	Nick Harrison	11
Richard Childress Racing	Chevrolet	33	Paul Menard	Nick Harrison	8
Richard Childress Racing	Chevrolet	33	Austin Dillon	Nick Harrison	1
Richard Petty Motorsports	Ford	09	Marcos Ambrose	Scott McDougall	1
Rick Ware Racing	Ford	15	Carlos Contreras	Jeff Spraker	1
Rick Ware Racing	Ford	15	Ryan Ellis	Jeff Schmidt	1
Rick Ware Racing	Ford	15	Carl Long	Kevin Eagle	2
Shepherd Racing Ventures	Chevrolet	89	Morgan Shepherd	Mike Malamphy; Kevyn Rebolledo; Claude Townsend	13
SR^{2} Motorsports	Toyota	00	Jason White	David Jones	1
SR^{2} Motorsports	Toyota	24	Harrison Rhodes	Tony Furr	1
SR^{2} Motorsports	Toyota	24	Rubén García Jr.	George White Jr.	2
SR^{2} Motorsports	Toyota	24	Ryan Ellis	George White Jr.	1
SR^{2} Motorsports	Toyota	24	Jason White	George White Jr.	1
SunEnergy1 Racing	Toyota	75	Kenny Habul	Craig Fletcher	1
Team Penske	Ford	12	Ryan Blaney	Greg Erwin	4
Team Penske	Ford	12	Joey Logano	Greg Erwin	1
The Motorsports Group	Chevrolet	46	Matt DiBenedetto	Kyle Symington; David Jones; Gary Showalter	14
The Motorsports Group	Chevrolet	46	Ryan Ellis	Kyle Symington; David Jones; Gary Showalter	11
The Motorsports Group	Chevrolet	46	Matt Frahm	Kyle Symington; David Jones; Gary Showalter	3
The Motorsports Group	Chevrolet	46	Josh Wise	Kyle Symington; David Jones; Gary Showalter	1
The Motorsports Group	Chevrolet	46	Josh Reaume	Kyle Symington; David Jones; Gary Showalter	1
The Motorsports Group	Chevrolet	46	Carl Long	Kyle Symington; David Jones; Gary Showalter	1
Tommy Baldwin Racing	Chevrolet	36	Ryan Preece	Zach McGowan	2
TriStar Motorsports	Toyota	10	David Starr	Todd Myers; Greg Conner	2
TriStar Motorsports	Toyota	10	Blake Koch	Todd Myers; Greg Conner	17
TriStar Motorsports	Toyota	10	Jeff Green	Todd Myers; Greg Conner	8
TriStar Motorsports	Toyota	10	Kevin Lepage	Todd Myers; Greg Conner	2
TriStar Motorsports	Toyota	10	Ross Chastain	Todd Myers; Greg Conner	1
TriStar Motorsports	Toyota	10	Mike Bliss	Paul Clapprood	2
TriStar Motorsports	Toyota	91	Jeff Green	Josh Reaume; Blake Climo; Todd Myers	7
TriStar Motorsports	Toyota	91	Benny Gordon	Eddie Pardue	1
TriStar Motorsports	Toyota	91	Blake Koch	Todd Myers	1
Turner Scott Motorsports	Chevrolet	30	Danica Patrick	Mike Greci	1
Vision Racing	Dodge	37	Matt DiBenedetto	Adrian Berryhill	1
Vision Racing	Dodge	37	Ryan Ellis	Adrian Berryhill	1

=== Driver changes ===
Between the 2013 and 2014 seasons, several driver changes have occurred. Kevin Harvick will run with JR Motorsports for 13 races. Numerous drivers will move up to the Nationwide Series full-time; Brendan Gaughan, Ty Dillon, Ryan Reed, Dakoda Armstrong, Landon Cassill, as well as 2012 ARCA champion Chris Buescher, and his cousin James Buescher, the 2012 NASCAR Camping World Truck Series champion. Maryeve Dufault will contest a limited schedule. Sam Hornish Jr. moves from Penske Racing to Joe Gibbs Racing, where he will share a ride with Kyle Busch. Kyle Busch Motorsports will not field any cars in 2014 due to lack of funding.

== Schedule ==
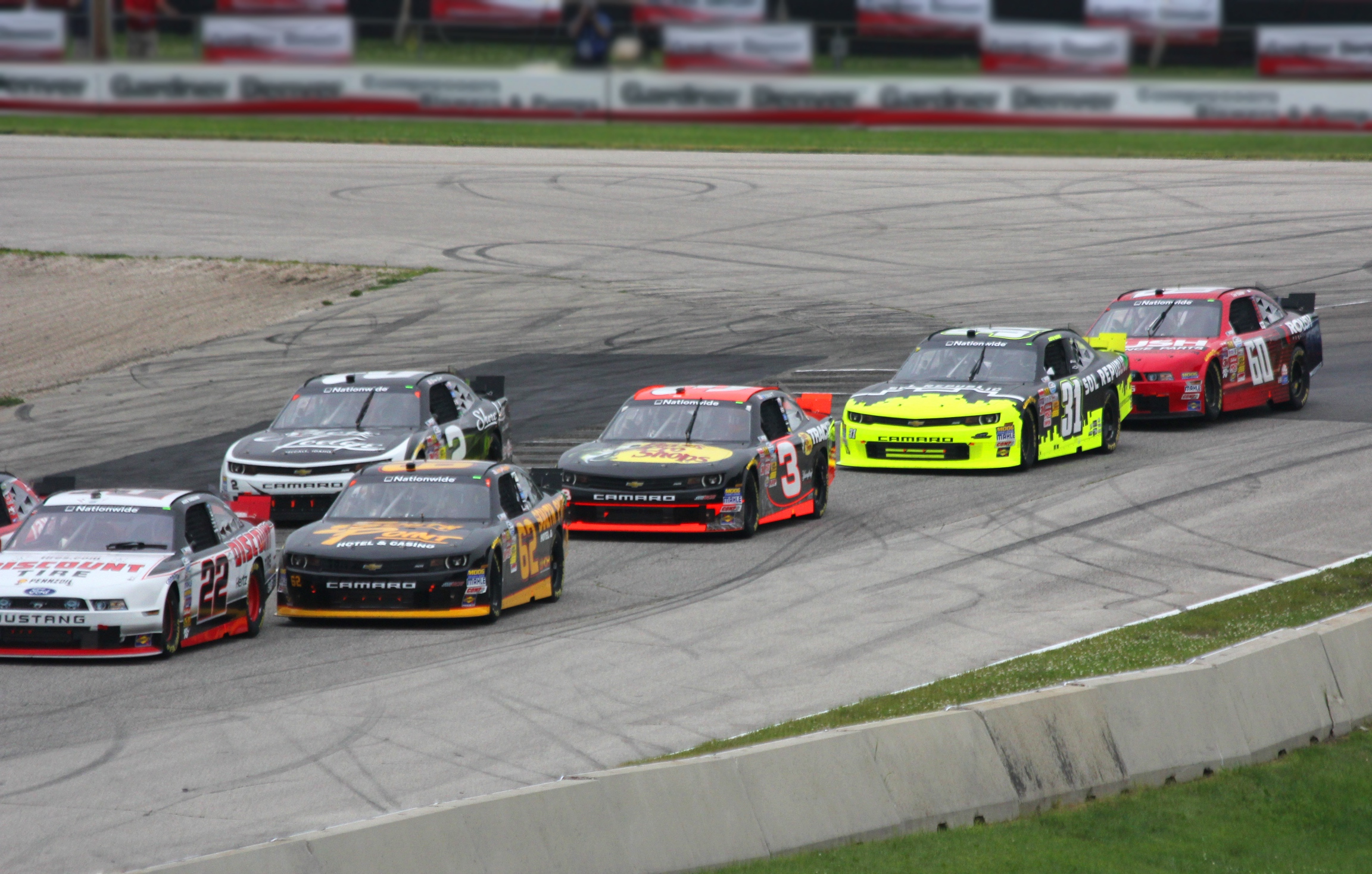
The lead cars during Gardner Denver 200 in June (Turn 5 at Road America)

The calendar was released on October 18, 2013.

No.	Race title	Track	Location	Date
1	DRIVE4COPD 300	Daytona International Speedway	Daytona Beach, Florida	February 22
2	Blue Jeans Go Green 200	Phoenix International Raceway	Avondale, Arizona	March 1
3	Boyd Gaming 300	Las Vegas Motor Speedway	Las Vegas, Nevada	March 8
4	Drive to Stop Diabetes 300	Bristol Motor Speedway, Bristol	Bristol, Tennessee	March 15
5	Treatmyclot.com 300	Auto Club Speedway	Fontana, California	March 22
6	O'Reilly Auto Parts 300	Texas Motor Speedway	Fort Worth, Texas	April 4
7	VFW Sport Clips Help a Hero 200	Darlington Raceway	Darlington, South Carolina	April 11
8	ToyotaCare 250	Richmond International Raceway	Richmond, Virginia	April 25
9	Aaron's 312	Talladega Superspeedway	Talladega, Alabama	May 3
10	Get To Know Newton 250	Iowa Speedway	Newton, Iowa	May 18
11	History 300	Charlotte Motor Speedway	Concord, North Carolina	May 24
12	Buckle Up 200	Dover International Speedway	Dover, Delaware	May 31
13	Ollie's Bargain Outlet 250	Michigan International Speedway	Cambridge Township, Michigan	June 14
14	Gardner Denver 200	Road America	Elkhart Lake, Wisconsin	June 21
15	John R. Elliott HERO Campaign 300	Kentucky Speedway	Sparta, Kentucky	June 27
16	Subway Firecracker 250	Daytona International Speedway	Daytona Beach, Florida	July 4
17	Sta-Green 200	New Hampshire Motor Speedway	Loudon, New Hampshire	July 12
18	EnjoyIllinois.com 300	Chicagoland Speedway	Joliet, Illinois	July 19
19	Lilly Diabetes 250	Indianapolis Motor Speedway	Speedway, Indiana	July 26
20	U.S. Cellular 250	Iowa Speedway	Newton, Iowa	August 2
21	Zippo 200 at The Glen	Watkins Glen International	Watkins Glen, New York	August 9
22	Nationwide Children's Hospital 200	Mid-Ohio Sports Car Course	Lexington, Ohio	August 16
23	Food City 300	Bristol Motor Speedway	Bristol, Tennessee	August 22
24	Great Clips / Grit Chips 300	Atlanta Motor Speedway	Hampton, Georgia	August 30
25	Virginia 529 College Savings 250	Richmond International Raceway	Richmond, Virginia	September 5
26	Jimmy John's Freaky Fast 300	Chicagoland Speedway	Joliet, Illinois	September 13
27	VisitMyrtleBeach.com 300	Kentucky Speedway	Sparta, Kentucky	September 20
28	Dover 200	Dover International Speedway	Dover, Delaware	September 27
29	Kansas Lottery 300	Kansas Speedway	Kansas City, Kansas	October 4
30	Drive for the Cure 300	Charlotte Motor Speedway	Concord, North Carolina	October 10
31	O'Reilly Auto Parts Challenge	Texas Motor Speedway	Fort Worth, Texas	November 1
32	DAV 200	Phoenix International Raceway	Avondale, Arizona	November 8
33	Ford EcoBoost 300	Homestead–Miami Speedway	Homestead, Florida	November 15

== Results and standings ==
=== Races ===
No.	Race	Pole Position	Most Laps Led	Winning driver	Manufacturer	No.	Winning team
1	DRIVE4COPD 300	Dylan Kwasniewski	Kyle Busch	Regan Smith	Chevrolet	7	JR Motorsports
2	Blue Jeans Go Green 200	Brad Keselowski	Kyle Busch	Kyle Busch	Toyota	54	Joe Gibbs Racing
3	Boyd Gaming 300	Ty Dillon	Brad Keselowski	Brad Keselowski	Ford	2	Team Penske
4	Drive to Stop Diabetes 300	Kyle Larson	Matt Kenseth	Kyle Busch	Toyota	54	Joe Gibbs Racing
5	Treatmyclot.com 300	Elliott Sadler	Joey Logano	Kyle Larson	Chevrolet	42	Turner Scott Motorsports
6	O'Reilly Auto Parts 300	Kevin Harvick	Kevin Harvick	Chase Elliott	Chevrolet	9	JR Motorsports
7	VFW Sport Clips Help a Hero 200	Kyle Busch	Kyle Busch	Chase Elliott	Chevrolet	9	JR Motorsports
8	ToyotaCare 250	Brian Scott	Kevin Harvick	Kevin Harvick	Chevrolet	5	JR Motorsports
9	Aaron's 312	Sam Hornish Jr.	Elliott Sadler	Elliott Sadler	Toyota	11	Joe Gibbs Racing
10	Get To Know Newton 250	Ryan Blaney	Sam Hornish Jr.	Sam Hornish Jr.	Toyota	54	Joe Gibbs Racing
11	History 300	Kyle Busch	Kyle Larson	Kyle Larson	Chevrolet	42	Turner Scott Motorsports
12	Buckle Up 200	Joey Logano	Kyle Busch	Kyle Busch	Toyota	54	Joe Gibbs Racing
13	Ollie's Bargain Outlet 250	Kyle Busch	Kyle Larson	Paul Menard	Chevrolet	33	Richard Childress Racing
14	Gardner Denver 200	Alex Tagliani	Sam Hornish Jr.	Brendan Gaughan	Chevrolet	62	Richard Childress Racing
15	John R. Elliott HERO Campaign 300	Brad Keselowski	Brad Keselowski	Kevin Harvick	Chevrolet	5	JR Motorsports
16	Subway Firecracker 250	Dakoda Armstrong	Regan Smith	Kasey Kahne	Chevrolet	5	JR Motorsports
17	Sta-Green 200	Kyle Busch	Brad Keselowski	Brad Keselowski	Ford	22	Team Penske
18	EnjoyIllinois.com 300	Brian Scott	Chase Elliott	Chase Elliott	Chevrolet	9	JR Motorsports
19	Lilly Diabetes 250	Kyle Busch	Kevin Harvick	Ty Dillon	Chevrolet	3	Richard Childress Racing
20	U.S. Cellular 250	Trevor Bayne	Brad Keselowski	Brad Keselowski	Ford	22	Team Penske
21	Zippo 200 at the Glen	Brad Keselowski	Marcos Ambrose	Marcos Ambrose	Ford	09	Richard Petty Motorsports
22	Nationwide Children's Hospital 200	Sam Hornish Jr.	Brian Scott	Chris Buescher	Ford	60	Roush Fenway Racing
23	Food City 300	Kyle Busch	Kyle Busch	Ryan Blaney	Ford	22	Team Penske
24	Great Clips / Grit Chips 300	Chase Elliott	Kevin Harvick	Kevin Harvick	Chevrolet	5	JR Motorsports
25	Virginia 529 College Savings 250	Kyle Busch	Kyle Busch	Kyle Busch	Toyota	54	Joe Gibbs Racing
26	Jimmy John's Freaky Fast 300	Brian Scott	Kyle Busch	Kevin Harvick	Chevrolet	5	JR Motorsports
27	VisitMyrtleBeach.com 300	Ty Dillon	Ty Dillon	Brendan Gaughan	Chevrolet	62	Richard Childress Racing
28	Dover 200	Joey Logano	Kyle Busch	Kyle Busch	Toyota	54	Joe Gibbs Racing
29	Kansas Lottery 300	Ty Dillon	Kevin Harvick	Kyle Busch	Toyota	54	Joe Gibbs Racing
30	Drive for the Cure 300	Chase Elliott	Chase Elliott	Brad Keselowski	Ford	22	Team Penske
31	O'Reilly Auto Parts Challenge	Joey Logano	Kyle Busch	Kyle Busch	Toyota	54	Joe Gibbs Racing
32	DAV 200	Kyle Busch	Kyle Busch	Brad Keselowski	Ford	22	Team Penske
33	Ford EcoBoost 300	Brad Keselowski	Kyle Larson	Matt Kenseth	Toyota	20	Joe Gibbs Racing

=== Drivers' championship ===
(key) Bold – Pole position awarded by qualifying time. Italics – Pole position earned by points standings or practice time. * – Most laps led

Pos	Driver	DAY	PHO	LVS	BRI	CAL	TXS	DAR	RCH	TAL	IOW	CLT	DOV	MCH	ROA	KEN	DAY	NHA	CHI	IND	IOW	GLN	MOH	BRI	ATL	RCH	CHI	KEN	DOV	KAN	CLT	TEX	PHO	HOM	Points
1	Chase Elliott **(R)**	15	9	5	9	6	1	1	2	19	4	37	5	6	4	12	20	8	1*	12	8	6	4	3	**5**	2	10	4	3	10	**8***	4	5	17	1213
2	Regan Smith	1	8	10	10	10	7	8	8	3	3	7	10	7	13	28	2*	10	16	10	6	17	2	5	6	6	8	5	8	22	11	11	10	6	1171
3	Elliott Sadler	5	6	13	17	**5**	10	2	6	1*	5	12	9	17	9	10	21	6	10	15	10	7	7	29	10	8	6	13	5	7	9	9^{3}	3	9	1154
4	Brian Scott	17	11	7	14	12	12	11	**5**	33	6	5	7	5	16	8	16	7	**6**	7	7	10	3*	11	7	5	**9**	2	7	9	10	6	7	10	1154
5	Ty Dillon **(R)**	7	10	**11**	6	8	9	10	14	15	8	10	8	9	19	7	11	12	5	1	5	8	19	4	9	9	7	**3***	10	**5**	30	15	4	7	1148
6	Trevor Bayne	3	7	8	8	9	23	9	11	10	9	8	2	30	27	15	9	9	2	9	**3**	13	9	13	12	15	5	15	9	8	7	36	9	11	1086
7	Chris Buescher **(R)**	DNQ	15	9	16	14	27	34	7	2	13	9	11	10	18	18	12	5	8	11	14	29	1	10	13	10	12	7	4	28	6	13	12	5	1014
8	Brendan Gaughan	6	16	16	7	15	11	22	20	34	12	17	12	22	1	6	28	16	11	19	11	28	20	6	14	18	13	1	28	13	16	16	8	29	954
9	Ryan Reed **(R)**	18	22	15	31	17	20	13	12	24	16	14	27	11	21	17	4	11	15	20	15	12	12	14	18	16	24	11	24	12	15	17	19	27	889
10	James Buescher	16	12	18	13	16	13	25	10	29	19	11	15	15	17	14	14	22	23	21	26	11	25	9	19	19	18	14	15	21	31	24	14	18	868
11	Dylan Kwasniewski **(R)**	**8**	13	24	15	11	14	23	32	35	11	13	26	31	26	11	24	13	17	14	9	27	8	25	21	11	17	12	21	11	14	14	15	19	867
12	Landon Cassill	21	19	19	12	35	33	12	13	8	10	30	14	14	8	13	30	15	21	16	13	33	14	22	15	14	16	29	16	34	17	19	32	35	800
13	Dakoda Armstrong **(R)**	23	18	23	24	20	22	18	17	18	21	19	16	19	25	20	**19**	30	20	17	21	25	10	28	33	7	22	19	17	25	19	10	21	20	788
14	Mike Bliss	20	17	14	26	18	32	16	16	12	31	20	22	18	10	34	38	32	19	22	16	14	11	17	17	20	20	24	29	14	18	18	16	23	779
15	Jeremy Clements	29	21	32	18	36	18	31	22	23	22	23	20	20	6	30	8	20	13	26	25	16	22	23	22	21	33	21	18	17	22	21	11	13	757
16	Ryan Sieg **(R)**	9^{2}	14^{2}	22^{2}	20^{2}	22	17	37	26	20	17	27	13	13	22	21	3	18	18	18	20	34	16	16	20	23	21	17	14	20	13	33	20	36	682
17	J. J. Yeley			21^{2}		19	16	14	18	7	18	21	28	21	5	22	35	17	14	24	17	35	26	30	16	31	25	23	22	18	39	20	30	16	651
18	Jeffrey Earnhardt	30	27	33	32	23	19	20	24	16	23	25	30	25	23	23	33	23	24	35	31	21	28	12	25	32	30	16	20	29	40	34	40	21	586
19	Eric McClure	35	23	27	27	25	24	21	29	17	24	29			20	24	22	26	25	36	23	24		20	24		26	31		19	32	26	26	26	521
20	Joey Gase	32	24	36	29	26	26	26	31	11	27	34	23	27	30	32	37	29	31	31	24	36	27	32	30	28	35	28	27	32	26	37	28	39	482
21	Matt DiBenedetto	DNQ	38	38	39	37	39	38	37	39	25		39	DNQ	11	40	DNQ	40	34	39	30	32	13	19	26	26	27	26	30	16	36	31	24	38	369
22	Tanner Berryhill **(R)**	DNQ	28	25	36	31	30	27	35	QL	35	40	29	36	28	38	36	27	29	30	35	31	17	36	23	DNQ	34	34	34	DNQ	37	27	33	31	365
23	Derrike Cope	37	34	35	28	28	38	29	28	DNQ	37	36	24	35	33	37	13	28	30	34	34	22	32	DNQ	31	DNQ	36	33	37	23	25	DNQ	31	DNQ	364
24	Blake Koch	22	39	20	40	39	40	40	21	40			40	24		19	DNQ	39	39	40	38	38	35	35	28	38	40	25	23	36		39	18	22	317
25	Jamie Dick	27	32	29	23	34	28			27				33		26			26	38	27			21	27	37		27	38	27	27	30	27		314
26	David Starr	25				24	15	35		9		24					25		22	25				31						15	20	25		30	293
27	Sam Hornish Jr.									**5**	1*			2	12*				36		4		**30**					30							242
28	Mike Wallace	13	20	26	25	21	37	17	27							25	10																35		229
29	Chad Boat **(R)**	24					31			25	29	26				DNQ	26		28	27	22			37		34					28	28	25		227
30	Carlos Contreras	DNQ	29			29		24			33	33			15		34	35				23	21		37						29	38		32	204
31	Jeff Green	40		40		40^{1}		39	38	38	39		18	23	36	39							29	40	40	30		40	26		35		34	40	172
32	Kevin Swindell																			23	29			27	36		31	22	33	37	23	22			157
33	Mike Harmon	34	31				29	33	33	28	38		32	28			39		38		39				34		DNQ	38	39	38	DNQ	DNQ			153
34	Kevin Lepage			34	34	30	25	19	39			39		39	38	DNQ		33	40	DNQ				38		40			31					DNQ	137
35	Tommy Joe Martins **(R)**		35	39	DNQ		35	30	36	14	36	31	35	38	31	DNQ	DNQ			DNQ															124
36	Josh Reaume								30				25			35		34	33	33	33		38			33	37	37	QL						116
37	Ryan Ellis			28							40		38	29	34			36	37				QL	DNQ		24	39	39	40	DNQ	DNQ	40	DNQ	DNQ	104
38	Carl Long	DNQ	37		38	38^{1}				37	28		34	34	35^{1}			Wth	35	37^{1}	32		36	DNQ	39		DNQ	DNQ	32^{1}	35			39		104
39	Alex Tagliani														**2**								5												82
40	Austin Theriault										15							21										18							78
41	Will Kimmel		33		22																					25	28				38				74
42	Robert Richardson Jr.	38		31			34			32							40			32												29			72
43	Cody Ware																						15			29	29	32							71
44	Kenny Habul														14							26	31												61
45	Justin Marks														24								6												58
46	Daniel Suárez								19																		15								54
47	Morgan Shepherd												37	DNQ							36			39	35	36	DNQ	36	35	DNQ	DNQ	DNQ	37^{1}		54
48	Kelly Admiraal				35																					22							22		53
49	Martin Roy		30													31											38			33		35		DNQ	53
50	Josh Berry																				12													25	51
51	Stanton Barrett														32							18	33												49
52	Kevin O'Connell														3							37													48
53	Ryan Preece																	14																28	46
54	Rubén García Jr.		25		33											33																			41
55	Harrison Rhodes	39										38		32				37^{1}										35	36						40
56	Daryl Harr		36	30		27																													39
57	Andy Lally														7																				37
58	Hermie Sadler																							24		27									37
59	Bobby Reuse														29								24												35
60	Hal Martin										26										28														34
61	Scott Lagasse Jr.	26															31																		31
62	Matt Frahm																	25			40			DNQ		39									28
63	Tim Cowen																						18												26
64	Paulie Harraka												19																						25
65	Kenny Wallace																				19														25
66	Jason White	31				32																													25
67	Ryan Gifford										20																								24
68	Bobby Gerhart	33								36							DNQ																		19
69	Mackena Bell																																29		15
70	John Jackson																				37^{1}		34^{1}		38	35	DNQ							DNQ	15
71	Matt Carter	DNQ			37^{1}			36						37																	DNQ				15
72	Roger Reuse																					30	39^{1}												14
73	Tim Schendel										34			40	37^{1}																				14
74	Milka Duno																							DNQ					DNQ	40				34	14
75	Kyle Fowler											32																							12
76	Richard Harriman																		32																12
	Benny Gordon													QL			DNQ																		0
Ineligible for Nationwide Series driver points
Pos.	Driver	DAY	PHO	LVS	BRI	CAL	TXS	DAR	RCH	TAL	IOW	CLT	DOV	MCH	ROA	KEN	DAY	NHA	CHI	IND	IOW	GLN	MOH	BRI	ATL	RCH	CHI	KEN	DOV	KAN	CLT	TEX	PHO	HOM	Points
	Kyle Busch	4*	1*	2	1	3	2	**4***	3			**3**	1*	**4**		3	17	2		**2**		2		**2***	4	**1***	3*		1*	1	2	1*	**2***	2	
	Brad Keselowski	2	**3**	1*								2				**2***		**1***			1*	**4**									1		1	**8**	
	Kevin Harvick		2		3	2	**4***	7	1*			4				1				4*				7	1*	3	1			2*		8			
	Kyle Larson	10	4	3	**2**	1	3	6	4	30		1*	6	8*		9	5	4	3	8		15		26	3	13	2		6	30	5	12	13	3*	
	Ryan Blaney				4		8		9	21	**2**					5			9					1		4	4			3	4	3		4	
	Matt Kenseth	14	5	6	5*	7	6	3				6	4			36		3		3		5			11	12				6	3	5		1	
	Paul Menard													1		4		19		6		9					11			4				12	
	Kasey Kahne									22							1		4																
	Marcos Ambrose																					1*													
	Joey Logano					4*		5					**3**	16			6			5		3			2				**2**			**2**			
	Michael McDowell										7										2							8							
	Dale Earnhardt Jr.	11		4			5							3																					
	David Ragan	DNQ		17		13				4							23			13					8										
	Erik Jones																		7					8									6		
	Cale Conley				11			32	15		30		31						12					15		17		6	11		33				
	Joe Nemechek	12			19				23	6			17				27																		
	Bubba Wallace									31							7																		
	Austin Dillon																															7			
	Justin Boston																											9	12						
	Ross Chastain											18		12			29										19	10			21			14	
	Alex Bowman																												19		12		17		
	Matt Crafton			12																															
	Aric Almirola																										14		13						
	John Wes Townley									13		22				Wth	18		27	28				18	32					31		23	23	33	
	Chase Pistone										14										18							20							
	Johnny Sauter	28										16					15																		
	Josh Wise	36	26	37	30	33	21	15	25	26		28	33	26		29	32	38		29		39													
	T. J. Bell																																38	15	
	Jeb Burton											15																							
	Corey LaJoie															16														26	24	32		37	
	Brennan Newberry																	24				19					23						36		
	Danica Patrick	19																																	
	Tomy Drissi																					20	23												
	Timmy Hill				21								21										37	34					25	39	34				
	Jake Crum															27		31						33										24	
	Jennifer Jo Cobb																													24					
	Todd Bodine							28					36																						
	Chris Cockrum											35													29										
	Caleb Roark										32																								
	Denny Hamlin																										32								
	Derek White						36		34																										
	Jimmy Weller III								40																						DNQ				
	Willie Allen	DNQ			DNQ																														
	Clay Greenfield	DNQ																																	
	Clint Bowyer																															QL			
Pos.	Driver	DAY	PHO	LVS	BRI	CAL	TXS	DAR	RCH	TAL	IOW	CLT	DOV	MCH	ROA	KEN	DAY	NHA	CHI	IND	IOW	GLN	MOH	BRI	ATL	RCH	CHI	KEN	DOV	KAN	CLT	TEX	PHO	HOM	Points
^{1} Post entry, driver and owner did not score points.
^{2} J. J. Yeley and Ryan Sieg started receiving Nationwide points at Auto Club.
^{3} Due to illness, Elliott Sadler was not able to contest all 200 laps, after 9 laps he got out of his car and was replaced by Clint Bowyer, who also qualified for him. As Bowyer finished 9th in the race, Sadler is officially 9th.

=== Owners' championship (Top 15) ===
(key) Bold - Pole position awarded by time. Italics - Pole position set by final practice results or rainout. * – Most laps led.

Pos.	No.	Car Owner	Driver	Races																																	Points
Pos.	No.	Car Owner	Driver	DAY	PHO	LVS	BRI	CAL	TXS	DAR	RCH	TAL	IOW	CLT	DOV	MCH	ROA	KEN	DAY	NHA	CHI	IND	IOW	GLN	MOH	BRI	ATL	RCH	CHI	KEN	DOV	KAN	CLT	TEX	PHO	HOM	Points
1	22	Roger Penske	Brad Keselowski	2	**3**	1*								2				**2***		**1***			1*	**4**									1		1	**8**	1347
1	22	Roger Penske	Ryan Blaney				4		8		9	21	**2**								9					1		4	4			3					1347
1	22	Roger Penske	Joey Logano					4*		5					**3**	16			6			5					2				**2**			**2**			1347
1	22	Roger Penske	Alex Tagliani														**2**								5												1347
1	22	Roger Penske	Michael McDowell																											8							1347
2	54	J. D. Gibbs	Kyle Busch	4*	1*	2	1	3	2	**4***	3			**3**	1*	**4**		3	17	2		**2**		2		**2***	4	**1***	3*		1*	1	2	1*	**2***	2	1324
2	54	J. D. Gibbs	Sam Hornish Jr.									**5**	1*				12*				36		4		**30**					30							1324
3	9	Dale Earnhardt Jr.	Chase Elliott **(R)**	15	9	5	9	6	1	1	2	19	4	37	5	6	4	12	20	8	1*	12	8	6	4	3	**5**	2	10	4	3	10	**8***	4	5	17	1213
4	42	Harry Scott Jr.	Kyle Larson	10	4	3	**2**	1	3	6	4	30		1*	6	8*		9	5	4	3	8		15		26	3	13	2		6	30	5	12	13	3*	1173
4	42	Harry Scott Jr.	Dylan Kwasniewski **(R)**										11				26						9		8					12							1173
5	7	Kelley Earnhardt Miller	Regan Smith	1	8	10	10	10	7	8	8	3	3	7	10	7	13	28	2*	10	16	10	6	17	2	5	6	6	8	5	8	22	11	11	10	6	1171
6	11	J. D. Gibbs	Elliott Sadler	5	6	13	17	**5**	10	2	6	1*	5	12	9	17	9	10	21	6	10	15	10	7	7	29	10	8	6	13	5	7	9	9^{1}	3	9	1154
7	2	Richard Childress	Brian Scott	17	11	7	14	12	12	11	**5**	33	6	5	7	5	16	8	16	7	**6**	7	7	10	3*	11	7	5	**9**	2	7	9	10	6	7	10	1154
8	3	Richard Childress	Ty Dillon **(R)**	7	10	**11**	6	8	9	10	14	15	8	10	8	9	19	7	11	12	5	1	5	8	19	4	9	9	7	**3***	10	**5**	30	15	4	7	1148
9	20	J. D. Gibbs	Matt Kenseth	14	5	6	5*	7	6	3				6	4			36		3		3		5			11	12				6	3	5		1	1142
9	20	J. D. Gibbs	Daniel Suárez								19																										1142
9	20	J. D. Gibbs	Bubba Wallace									31							7																		1142
9	20	J. D. Gibbs	Michael McDowell										7										2														1142
9	20	J. D. Gibbs	Sam Hornish Jr.													2																					1142
9	20	J. D. Gibbs	Kenny Habul														14								31												1142
9	20	J. D. Gibbs	Erik Jones																		7					8									6		1142
9	20	J. D. Gibbs	Denny Hamlin																										32								1142
9	20	J. D. Gibbs	Justin Boston																											9	12						1142
10	6	Jack Roush	Trevor Bayne	3	7	8	8	9	23	9	11	10	9	8	2	30	27	15	9	9	2	9	**3**	13	9	13	12	15	5	15	9	8	7	36	9	11	1086
11	60	Jack Roush	Chris Buescher **(R)**	DNQ	15	9	16	14	27	34	7	2	13	9	11	10	18	18	12	5	8	11	14	29	1	10	13	10	12	7	4	28	6	13	12	5	1014
12	88	Rick Hendrick^{2}	Dale Earnhardt Jr.	11		4			5							3																					1009
12	88	Rick Hendrick^{2}	Kevin Harvick		2																																1009
12	5	Rick Hendrick^{2}	Kevin Harvick				3	2	**4***	7	1*			4				1				4*				7	1*	3	1			2*		8			1009
12	5	Rick Hendrick^{2}	Kasey Kahne									22							1		4																1009
12	5	Rick Hendrick^{2}	Austin Theriault										15							21										18							1009
12	5	Rick Hendrick^{2}	Josh Berry																				12													25	1009
12	5	Rick Hendrick^{2}	Alex Bowman																														12		17		1009
13	62	Richard Childress	Brendan Gaughan	6	16	16	7	15	11	22	20	34	12	17	12	22	1	6	28	16	11	19	11	28	20	6	14	18	13	1	28	13	16	16	8	29	954
14	16	Jack Roush	Ryan Reed **(R)**	18	22	15	31	17	20	13	12	24	16	14	27	11	21	17	4	11	15	20	15	12	12	14	18	16	24	11	24	12	15	17	19	27	889
15	99	Robby Benton	James Buescher	16	12	18	13	16	13	25	10	29	19	11	15	15	17	14	14	22	23	21	26	11	25	9	19	19	18	14	15	21	31	24	14	18	868
Pos.	No.	Car Owner	Driver	DAY	PHO	LVS	BRI	CAL	TXS	DAR	RCH	TAL	IOW	CLT	DOV	MCH	ROA	KEN	DAY	NHA	CHI	IND	IOW	GLN	MOH	BRI	ATL	RCH	CHI	KEN	DOV	KAN	CLT	TEX	PHO	HOM	Points
Pos.	No.	Car Owner	Driver	Races																																	Points
^{1} Due to illness, Elliott Sadler was not able to contest all 200 laps, after 9 laps he got out of his car and was replaced by Clint Bowyer, who also qualified for him. As Bowyer finished 9th in the race, Sadler is officially 9th.
^{2} The No. 5 car was originally the No. 88 for the first 3 races, before switching to No. 5. Team only attempted 27 of the 33 races.

=== Manufacturers' championship ===
Pos	Manufacturer	Wins	Points
1	Chevrolet	15	**1,452**
2	Toyota	10	**1,426**
3	Ford	8	**1,402**
4	Dodge	0	**829**

== See also ==
- 2014 NASCAR Sprint Cup Series
- 2014 NASCAR Camping World Truck Series
- 2014 ARCA Racing Series
- 2014 NASCAR K&N Pro Series East
- 2014 NASCAR K&N Pro Series West
- 2014 NASCAR Whelen Modified Tour
- 2014 NASCAR Whelen Southern Modified Tour
- 2014 NASCAR Canadian Tire Series
- 2014 NASCAR Toyota Series
- 2014 NASCAR Whelen Euro Series
