= Strasburger =

Strasburger is a German locational surname, which originally meant a person from Strasbourg, France or Strasburg, Germany. The name may refer to:

- Charles Strasburger, American college men's basketball head coach
- Eduard Strasburger (1844–1912), German botanist
- Henryk Leon Strasburger (1887–1951), German internist
- Julius Strasburger (1871–1934), Polish politician
- Larry Hollingsworth Strasburger (1935–2015), American psychiatrist
- Maria-Paulina Strasburger (1878–1945), Polish politician
- Scott Strasburger (born 1963), American football player
- Paul Strasburger (born 1946), British politician
- Victor C. Strasburger (born 1949), American pediatrician

== See also ==
- Straßburger (disambiguation)
