= Straßburger =

Straßburger or Strassburger may refer to:

- Straßburger Wurstsalat, a type of Wurstsalat, or sausage salad
- Straßburger Münster, a name for the Strasbourg Cathedral
- Straßburger FV, a former name of the AS Strasbourg football team

== People with the surname ==
- John Strassburger (1942–2010), American educator
- Ralph B. Strassburger (1883–1959), American businessman
- Wilhelm Straßburger (1907–1991), German footballer

== See also ==
- Straßberger
- Strasburger
- Strasburg (disambiguation)
- Strassberg (disambiguation)
