= Turner Motorsports =

Turner Motorsports may refer to:

- Turner Motorsport, an American BMW performance tuning facility and production car racing team
- Turner Scott Motorsports, a NASCAR team a.k.a. Turner Motorsports, 1999–2014
