= Yves Romestan =

British businessman

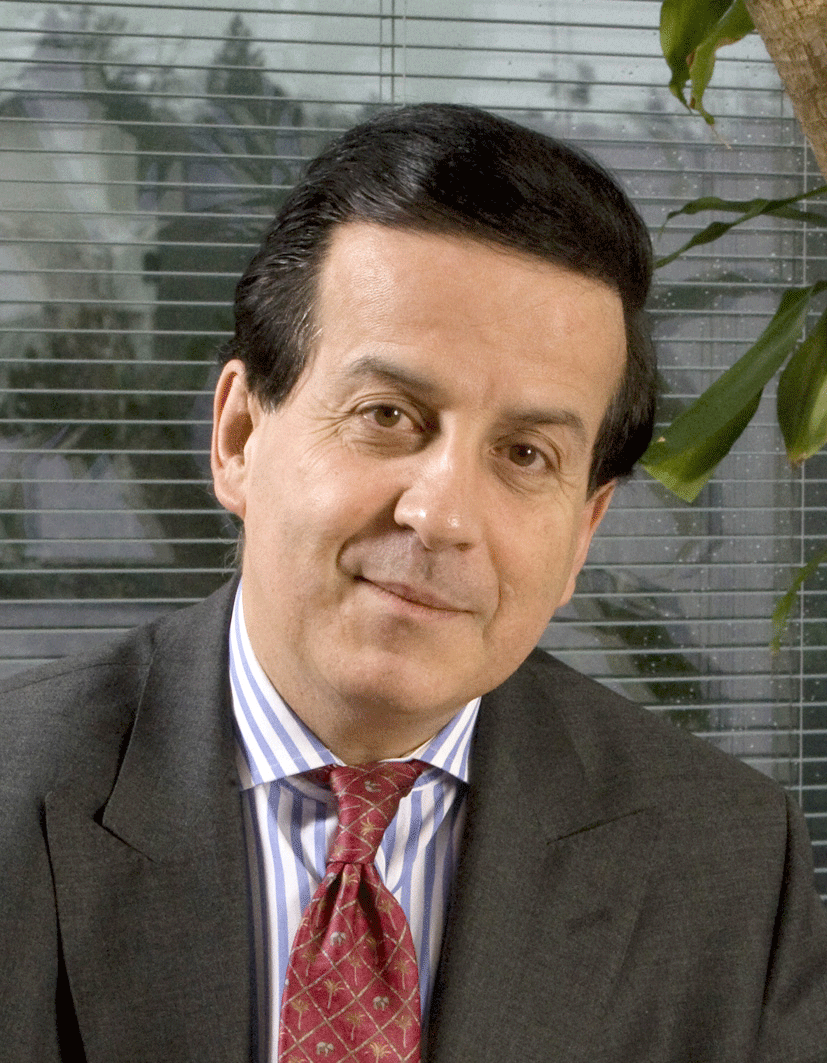
- Born: France
- Education: Institut d'Etudes Politique de Paris, Degree in Public Law
- Occupation: Businessman
- Organization: YRSA
- Known for: Developing international brand strategies as well as global-scale corporate restructures and acquisition communications programmes

Yves Romestan has worked for global corporate companies such as Total, Lafarge, Banques Populaires Group, CEA, Bouygues, Brandt and Walgreens Boots Alliance.

He founded in 2019 the French-British YRSA Group, which includes a communication agency, a real estate company and a publishing branch.

He is also Professor of Economics at the INSEAD.

== Education ==
Romestan graduated from the Institut d'Etudes Politiques in Paris, France. He holds a degree in public law.

== Career ==
Architect of the communications strategy that contributed to the building of Walgreens Boots Alliance the international communications strategist has been a key figure in corporate restructures, acquisition programmes, brand strategies and geographical expansions in various industries over the last 30 years.

=== Early career ===
Romestan started in the Paris press office for French oil giant Total in 1979, dealing with challenges that included refining problems in Europe, political instability in the Middle East and Africa and competition issues.

After 11 years, he moved to head up PR for the Commissariat à l'Energie Atomique, France's atomic energy commission.

In 1992, he became Head of External Communications for Banques Populaires Group to oversee the whole spectrum of its external communications including advertising, PR and financial communications.

=== Career in construction industry ===
Romestan then became Director of External Communications at Lafarge, where he developed international PR and financial comms to boost the brand awareness of the building materials company across the world. He played a role in the successful takeover of Redland PLC in 1997.

In 1998, he joined Brandt Group as the Group Communications Director.

He was hired in 2000 by Bouygues Construction, an important subsidiary of the Bouygues group, to develop and promote the company image as Communications Director.

=== Career in pharmaceutical ===
==== Alliance UniChem ====
In 2003, Romestan became Director of Group Communications of Alliance UniChem Plc Romestan was hired to create a European-wide Public Relations team from scratch. He designed the brand strategy of the company and was responsible for overseeing the rebranding of some 1,100 pharmacies.

==== Alliance Boots ====
When Boots Group PLC and Alliance UniChem Plc merged in July 2006 to become Alliance Boots, Romestan was responsible for creating the newly formed company's identity. In 2006 and 2007, he created the marketing function within the Alliance Healthcare Division. Romestan was promoted to Group Communications Director in 2007. He oversaw public relations, financial communications, multimedia, internal communications and the communications of all the Alliance Boots and Alliance Healthcare businesses and countries.

==== Walgreens Boots Alliance ====
Walgreens Boots Alliance was created through the combination of Walgreens and Alliance Boots in December 2014. Romestan played a significant role in the implementation of the internal and external communications strategy for the merger between the two companies. As Senior Vice-President, Communications and International Affairs of Walgreens Boots Alliance, he was responsible for the implementation of the company's communications and international affairs strategy. This included internal and external communications, M&A, crisis and reputational management, corporate and employer brand. Romestan led divisional, business and brand communications for the Retail Pharmacy and Pharmaceutical Wholesale Divisions, plus the Global Brands function.

=== Communication agencies ===
In December 2017, Romestan became Executive Vice-President at ComCorp, an independent European communications agency headquartered in Paris.

In 2019, Romestan founded the French-British YRSA Group, which includes a communication agency, a real estate company and a publishing branch.

== Personal ==
Married to wife Angelina (GP), and has three children – Vanina, Laetitia and Alexandre.

Professor of Economics at the European Institute of Business and an advisor for start-ups, Romestan has dual nationality (French/British). His interests include vintage cars and Bordeaux wines.

== Awards ==
- Winner of the national competition for economics in 1972 "premier prix au concours général"
- Received laureate award for degree in political sciences from IEP (Institut d'Etudes Politiques de Paris)
- TopCom award for outstanding achievements in the communications arena
