= Hermann Strasburger =

German historian

Hermann Strasburger (21 June 1909 – 4 April 1985) was a German ancient historian. He was the son of the internist Julius Strasburger and grandson of the botanist Eduard Strasburger.
