= Oskar Pischinger =

Austrian businessman

Oskar Pischinger (28 August 1863, Vienna - 7 January 1919, Vienna) was an Austrian confectionery manufacturer. He was the son of the entrepreneur Leopold Pischinger, who founded the sweets factory Oskar Pischinger in Vienna in 1842.

== Life ==
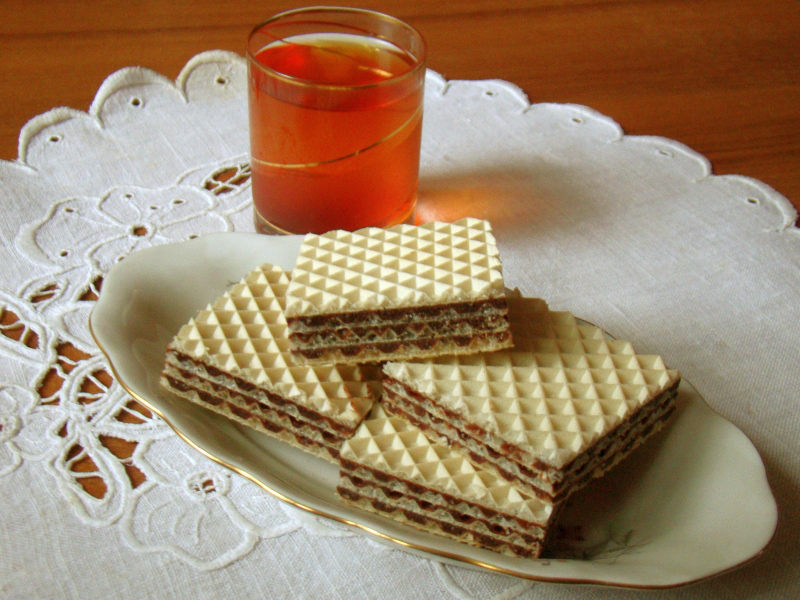
Modern homemade Pischinger cake

Pischinger learned the confectionery profession from his father. He later opened his own biscuit and zwieback factory in Vienna district Neubau, and in 1889 he joined his father's business. Right from the start, the Pischinger confectionery factory was equipped with modern machines that were constantly being renewed. Pischinger continuously brought out new varieties that were awarded prizes. In the 1880s he invented the Pischinger Torte, a kind of a layer cake made from wafers and buttery (usually chocolate) filling, that became a sales success and helped the family business to flourish across Europe. The company employed 200 to 500 workers and had numerous branches throughout the monarchy (Bratislava, Kraków, Czernowitz, Esseg, Budapest). Pischinger cake is still a popular dessert in regions of many countries that were under the Austria-Hungary rule, both widely bought and prepared at home.

== Litigation of the heirs ==
Pischinger had two sons, Oskar jr and Jacques, who inherited the factory. The company was dissolved at the end of 1925 and the brothers agreed that Jacques should serve the market in Austria and Oskar the market in Germany. Later there were disputes between the heirs over Oskar's breach of contract. The legal dispute was decided in court in 1951, stating that Oskar Pischinger jr would not be allowed to use the words "Oskar Pischinger" in the company name of his confectionery.
