= Strasburg =

Strasburg may refer to:

== Places ==
=== Austria ===
- Straßburg, Austria, in Carinthia

=== Canada ===
- Strasbourg, Saskatchewan, formerly Strassburg

=== France ===
- Strasbourg, France, in Grand Est, known in German as Straßburg

=== Germany ===
- Strasburg, Germany, Mecklenburg-Western Pomerania

=== Poland ===
- Brodnica, Kuyavian-Pomeranian Voivodeship, known in German as Strasburg in Westpreußen before World War I

=== Romania ===
- Aiud (German: Straßburg am Mieresch), Alba County

=== Ukraine ===
- Kuchurhan, Rozdilna Raion, formerly Strassburg

=== United States ===
- Strasburg, Colorado, divided between Adams County and Arapahoe County
- Strasburg, Illinois
- Strasburg, Missouri
- Strasburg, North Dakota
- Strasburg, Ohio
- Strasburg, Pennsylvania
- Strasburg Township, Pennsylvania
- Strasburg, Virginia

== People ==
- Stephen Strasburg (born 1988), baseball player

== Other uses ==
Strasburg: Alternative name for Devon, a manufactured meat product sold in Australia.

== See also ==
- Strasbourg (disambiguation)
- Strasberg, a surname
- Straßberg (disambiguation)
- Strasburger, the name of a prominent Polish-German family
