= Strasbourg (disambiguation) =

Strasbourg is the name of a city in France.

It may also refer to:

- AS Strasbourg, a French association football team
- French battleship Strasbourg
- RC Strasbourg Alsace, French association football team
- SIG Strasbourg, a French basketball club
- SMS Regensburg, a German cruiser that served in the French navy with the name Strasbourg
- Strasbourg (song), a song by English band the Rakes.
- Strasbourg, Saskatchewan, a town in Canada

== See also ==
- Strasburg
- Strasberg
- Straßberg
