= Ezra E. H. Griffith =

American psychiatrist

Ezra E. H. Griffith (born 1942 in Barbados) is an American psychiatrist. Griffith is professor emeritus of and senior research scientist in psychiatry; deputy chair for diversity and organizational ethics, department of psychiatry at the Yale University School of Medicine and emeritus professor of African and African-American studies at Yale University.

== Biography ==
When Griffith was 14 the family immigrated to New York City where he attended Boys High School (Brooklyn). His father was a pastor. He graduated from Harvard College in 1963. He served with the American army in Vietnam. Griffith earned his M.D. degree from the University of Strasbourg in 1973.

Griffith completed his residency in psychiatry at the Albert Einstein College of Medicine, then joined the faculty of the Yale University School of Medicine.

Griffith's fields of academic interest include cultural psychiatrist and ethnic identity; racial conflict; forensic psychiatry; psychiatry and religion; community psychiatry and administrative psychiatry.

Griffith has served as President of the Connecticut District Branch of the American Psychiatric Association, the American Board of Forensic Psychiatry, the Black Psychiatrists of America, the American Academy of Psychiatry and the Law, and the American Orthopsychiatric Association.

== Books ==
- I'm Your Father, Boy - A Family Memoir of Barbados, 2004 (ISBN 1587364212)
- Race and Excellence: My Dialogue with Chester Pierce, 1998 (ISBN 0877456283)
- Ye shall dream: Patriarch Granville Williams and the Barbados Spiritual Baptists, 2010, University of the West Indies Press
- Clinical guidelines in cross-cultural mental health, 1988 (ISBN 0471832316)
