= Straßberg =

Straßberg may refer to:

== Places in Germany ==
- Straßberg, Saxony-Anhalt, a municipality in the district of Harz of Saxony-Anhalt
- Straßberg, Zollernalbkreis, a former municipality in the Zollernalbkreis of Baden-Württemberg
- Straßberg, one of the communities amalgamated to form Bobingen, Bavaria, in 1972

== Other uses ==
- Straßberg, one of the Castles in South Tyrol
- Funkgerät (FuG 230) Straßburg, one of two receivers in the Kehl-Strasbourg radio control link, a German MCLOS radio control system of World War II

== See also ==
- Josef Straßberger, German weightlifter
- Strasburg (disambiguation)
- Strasberg
- Strasbourg (disambiguation)
