= Abraham Halpern =

American psychiatrist

Dr. Abraham L. Halpern (February 2, 1925 - April 20, 2013) was a Professor Emeritus of Psychiatry at New York Medical College and former president of The American Academy of Psychiatry and the Law.

In a wide-ranging career, Dr. Halpern was a champion of human rights especially in matters of law and mental health and was one of the founding leaders of the psychiatric sub-specialty of forensic psychiatry.

In 1965, Dr. Halpern participated in the Selma to Montgomery marches with Martin Luther King Jr., manning one of the ambulances in support of protestors.

Dr. Halpern had been a long-standing member of the UN Alliance of NGOs on Crime Prevention and Criminal Justice, representing both the International Council of Prison Medical Services and the World Psychiatric Association.

Halpern was a board member of Friends of Falun Gong, USA. Halpern is also a very strong opponent of the death penalty; he has written extensively on the subject of physician participation in executions. Halpern has also spoke out in defense of the curative benefits of psychoanalysis. Halpern has advocated for the abolition of the insanity defense

== Military service ==
Served on active duty in Royal Canadian Naval Volunteer Reserve from Sep. 24, 1942 to Nov. 30, 1945 in European, North Atlantic, and Pacific theatres.

Rank on discharge: Petty Officer.

Served in Royal Canadian Navy, 1953-1957, as follows:

Medical Officer, R.C.N. Hospital, Esquimalt, BC, July to Nov., 1953.

Medical Officer, H.M.C.S. "Cayuga", Nov., 1953 to Feb., 1955 - Far East (Korea).

Medical Officer, R.C.N. Hospital, Cornwallis, NS, Apr., 1955 to Sep., 1956.

Medical Officer, R.C.N. Hospital, Halifax, NS, Sep., 1956 to June, 1957.

Rank on discharge: Surgeon Lieutenant Commander.

== Awards ==
- In 2000 Dr. Halpern was given the Human Rights Award from the American Psychiatric Association.
- In 2003 he received the Medical Society State of New York's President's Citizenship Award.
- In 2004 he received the William C. Menninger Memorial Award for Distinguished Contributions to the Science of Mental Health from the American College of Physicians.

== Published works ==
- 'Soviet Psychiatry:An Exchange' (1989)
- Sweet Auburn: Recollections of a Prison Psychiatrist. (Frank Nesbit, 1999).
- 'The Culture of Control' (2003)
