= Straßberger =

Straßberger or Strassberger is a German surname. Notable people with the surname include:

- Josef Straßberger (1894–1950), German weightlifter
- Thaddeus Strassberger (born 1976), American opera director

== See also ==
- Straßburger (disambiguation)
