= Julius Strasburger =

German internist

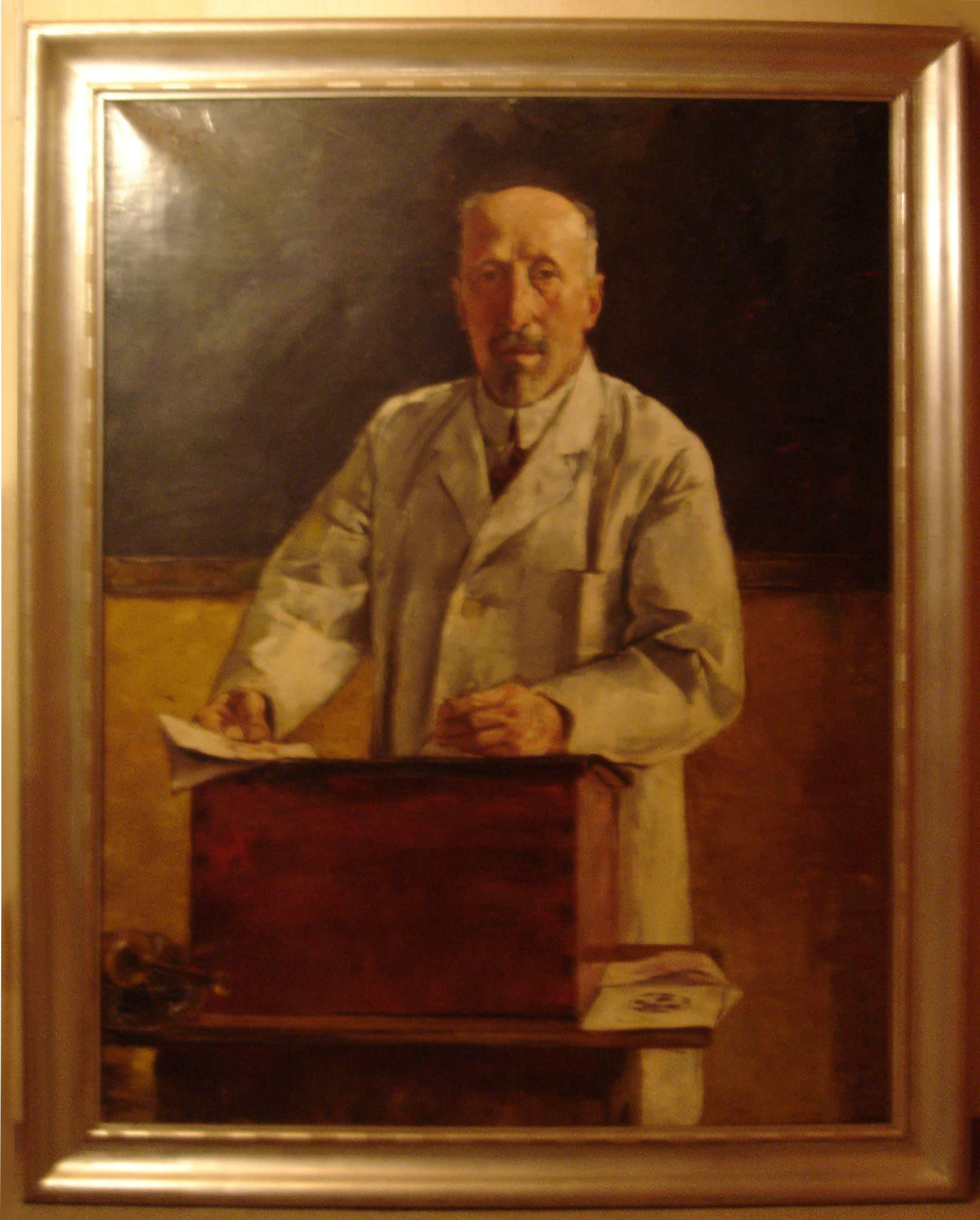
- Oil painting of Julius Strasburger
- Born: 26 December 1871; Jena
- Died: 28 October 1934; Frankfurt
- Occupations: Internist, medical doctor
- Spouse: Marie-Edith Strasburger
- Children: Hermann Strasburger
- Father: Eduard Strasburger

Julius Strasburger (26 December 1871, in Jena – 26 October 1934, in Königstein im Taunus near Frankfurt am Main) was a German internist. He was the son of botanist Eduard Strasburger (1844–1912).

He studied medicine at the universities of Bonn and Freiburg, receiving his doctorate in 1894 at Bonn with the thesis Die Sarcome des Dickdarms ("The Sarcomas of the Colon"). Following graduation, he served as an assistant to Carl Gerhardt at the second medical clinic in Berlin, and also as an assistant under Friedrich Schultze at the internal clinic in Bonn. In 1911 he became an associate professor at the University of Breslau, then in 1914 was named a full professor of internal medicine at the University of Frankfurt am Main. At Frankfurt, he also served as head of the institute for physical therapy.

On 1 April 1933, during the Nazi boycott of Jewish businesses, the National Socialists denied him access to his clinic in Frankfurt-Sachsenhausen. At the instigation of a scholar of his, who sought his position and found out Strasburger had a Jewish-born grandfather (Julius Wertheim, 1817 or 1819–1901, banker in Warsaw), an "Aryan certificate" was denied and they removed him from office on 28 September 1934. He died shortly after from a heart attack.

His specialized areas of study were blood circulation, physical therapy and the pathology of digestion. With internist Adolf Schmidt (1865–1918), the "Schmidt-Strasburger diet" is named; being defined as a diet used to facilitate the testing of feces in various types of diarrhea. Food items used in the diet are milk, zwieback, eggs, butter, beef, boiled potato, and gruel. With Schmidt, he published Die Faeces des Menschen (1903, 3rd edition 1915).

In 1909 he published Einführung in die Hydrotherapie und Thermotherapie ("Introduction to hydrotherapy and thermotherapy").

== Personal life ==
Strasburger was married to Marie-Edith, geb. Nothnagel, the daughter of Hermann Nothnagel. He was father of a daughter (Marie, later wife of Franz de Liagre-Böhl) and three sons, among them the zoologist Eduard Strasburger (1907–1945) and the Ancient Historian Hermann Strasburger (1909–1985).
