= American Academy of Psychiatry and the Law =

Forensic psychiatry professional organization

The American Academy of Psychiatry and the Law (AAPL) is a professional organization in the field of forensic psychiatry.

== History and organization ==
It publishes the quarterly Journal of the American Academy of Psychiatry and the Law. The Academy's Ethics guidelines for the practice of forensic psychiatry form the basis of the guidelines of the Canadian Academy of Psychiatry and the Law. They have also debated the medical ethics of psychiatrists testifying in death-penalty cases.

== Presidents ==
- Ryan C. Wagoner, MD 2024-2025
- Charles Dike, MD 2023-2024
- James L. Knoll IV, MD 2022-2023
- Susan Hatters Friedman, MD 2021-2022
- Liza Gold, MD 2020-2021
- William Newman, MD 2019-2020
- Richard L. Frierson, MD 2018-2019
- Christopher R. Thompson, MD 2017-2018
- Michael A. Norko, MD 2016-2017
- Emily A. Keram, MD 2015-2016
- Graham Glancy, MB 2014-2015
- Robert Weinstock, MD 2013-2014
- Debra A. Pinals, MD 2012-2013
- Charles L. Scott, MD 2011-2012
- Peter Ash, MD 2010-2011
- Stephen B. Billick, MD 2009-2010
- Patricia R. Recupero, MD, JD 2008-2009
- Jeffrey S. Janofsky, M.D. 2007-2008
- Alan R. Felthous, M.D. 2006-2007
- Robert I. Simon, M.D. 2005-2006
- Robert T.M. Phillips, M.D., Ph.D. 2004-2005
- Robert Wettstein, M.D. 2003-2004
- Roy J. O'Shaughnessy, M.D. 2002-2003
- Larry Strasburger, M.D. 2001-2002
- Jeffrey Metzner, M.D. 2000-2001
- Thomas G. Gutheil, M.D. 1999-2000
- Larry R. Faulkner, M.D. 1998-1999
- Renée L. Binder, M.D. 1997-1998
- Ezra E. H. Griffith, M.D. 1996-1997
- Paul S. Appelbaum, M.D. 1995-1996
- Park E. Dietz, M.D., Ph.D., M.P.H. 1994-1995
- John M. Bradford, M.B. 1993-1994
- Howard V. Zonana, M.D. 1992-1993
- Kathleen M. Quinn, M.D. 1991-1992
- Richard T. Rada, M.D. 1990-1991
- Joseph D. Bloom, M.D. 1989-1990
- William H. Reid, M.D. 1988-1989
- Richard Rosner, M.D. 1987-1988
- J. Richard Ciccone, M.D. 1986-1987
- Selwyn M. Smith, M.D. 1985-1986
- Phillip J. Resnick, M.D. 1984-1985
- Loren H. Roth, M.D. 1983-1984
- Abraham L. Halpern, M.D. 1982-1983
- Stanley L. Portnow, M.D. 1981-1982
- Herbert E. Thomas, M.D. 1980-1981
- Nathan I. Sidley, M.D. 1979-1980
- Irwin N. Perr, M.D. 1978-1979
- Gerald J. Sarwer-Foner, M.D. 1975-1977
- Seymour L. Pollack, M.D. 1973-1975
- Robert L. Sadoff, M.D. 1971-1973
- Jonas R. Rappeport, M.D. 1969-1971

== Selected publications ==
- Rosner, Richard (1982). Critical Issues in American Psychiatry and the Law, Volume 1. Thomas, ISBN 9780398045784
- Rosner, Richard (1985). Critical Issues in American Psychiatry and the Law, Volume 2. Thomas, ISBN 9780306419546

== See also ==
- Journal of the American Academy of Psychiatry and the Law
