= Turner Scott Motorsports =

American racecar team

- Turner Scott Motorsports logo following January 2013 rebranding
- Owners: Steve Turner; Harry Scott Jr.
- Base: Mooresville, North Carolina
- Series: Sprint Cup Series; Nationwide Series; Camping World Truck Series; NASCAR K&N Pro Series East; ARCA Racing Series
- Manufacturer: Chevrolet
- Opened: 2009
- Closed: 2014

Career
- Debut: Sprint Cup Series: 2012 Coke Zero 400 (Daytona); Nationwide Series: 2010 Kansas Lottery 300 (Kansas); Truck Series: 2009 WinStar World Casino 350 (Texas)
- Latest race: Nationwide Series: 2014 Ford EcoBoost 300 (Homestead); Truck Series: 2014 Ford EcoBoost 200 (Homestead)
- Races competed: Sprint Cup Series: 1 Nationwide Series: 368; Trucks Series: 259; ARCA Series: K&N East Series: 134
- Drivers' Championships: Total: 1 Sprint Cup Series: 0 Nationwide Series: 0 Truck Series: 1 ARCA Series: 0 K&N East Series: 0
- Race victories: Total: 22; Sprint Cup Series: 0 Nationwide Series: 8 Truck Series: 11; ARCA Series: 3 K&N East Series: 0
- Pole positions: Total: 23; Sprint Cup Series: 0 Nationwide Series: 5 Truck Series: 18; ARCA Series: 0 K&N East Series: 0

Turner Scott Motorsports (TSM), formerly Turner Motorsports was an American professional stock car racing team that last competed in the NASCAR Sprint Cup Series, the Nationwide Series, the Camping World Truck Series, the NASCAR K&N Pro Series East and the ARCA Racing Series. The team was based in Mooresville, North Carolina co-owned by Texas businessman Steve Turner and North Carolina businessman Harry Scott Jr. The team fielded cars utilizing Hendrick Motorsports engines. Co-owner Scott also owned the unaffiliated Sprint Cup Series team HScott Motorsports.

From 2003 through 2010, Turner Scott's Nationwide Series operations were those of Braun Racing, who for many years ran cars numbered 32 and 38 for Jason Leffler and Kasey Kahne with sponsors Great Clips and Fraternal Order of Eagles. The former-Braun operations also included entries of former Busch Series teams ppc Racing and Akins Motorsports.

The team ceased operations following the 2014 season due to financial issues between co-owners Scott and Turner. After winning a lawsuit against Turner, Scott took the remaining equipment from the team to start HScott Motorsports with Chip Ganassi.

== History ==
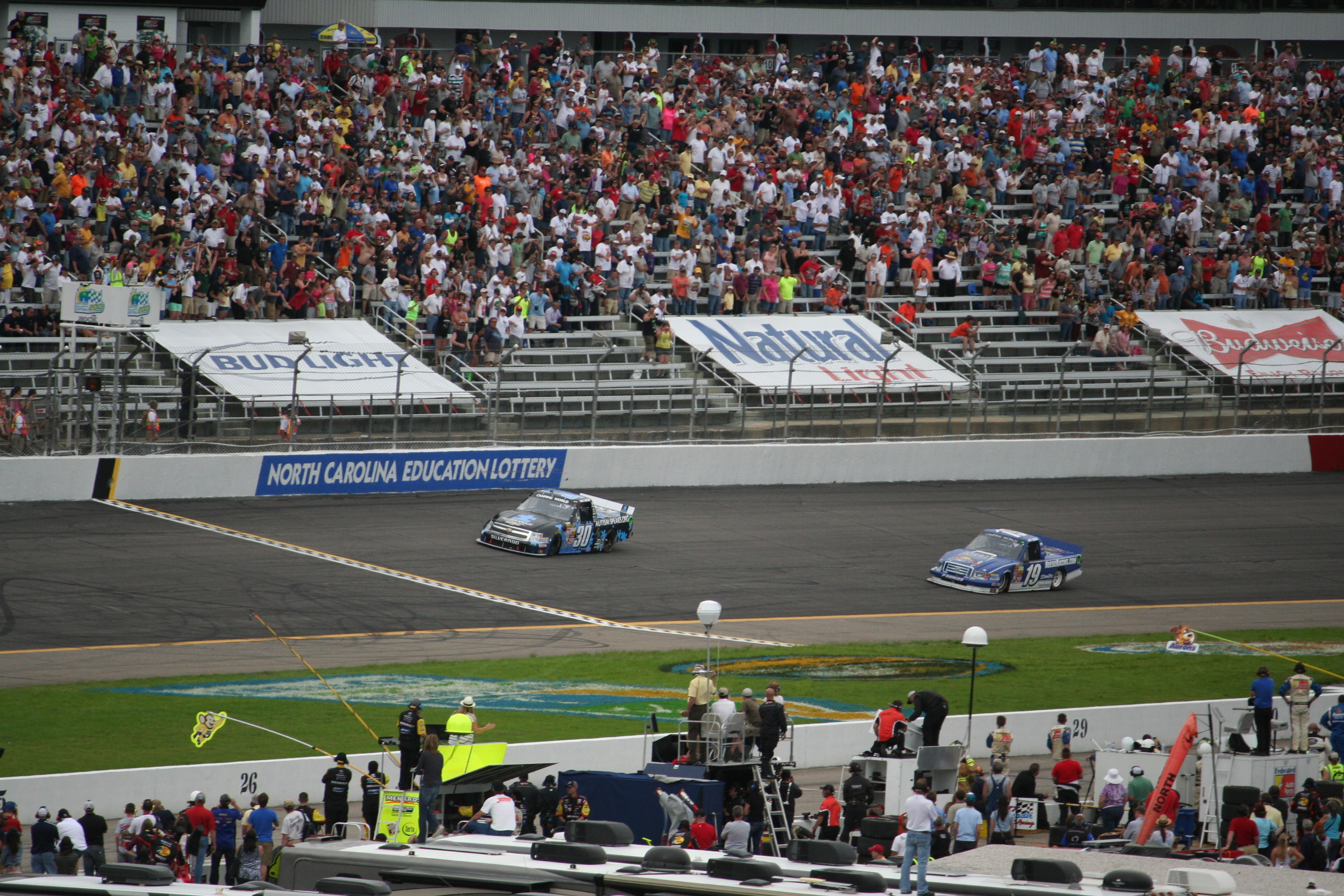
Kyle Larson beats Joey Logano to the finish at Rockingham in 2013

Turner Motorsports, LLC was founded in 1999 in Hallettsville, Texas by Steve Turner, President and CEO of RedHawk Energy, which owns team sponsor Wolf Pack Energy Services. The team debuted in the ASA Late Model Series in 2006 with James Buescher, then moved to the USAR Pro Cup Series in 2007. In 2009, the team moved their primary race operations to Mooresville, NC. Turner partnered with Win-Tron Racing and driver Beau Slocumb in the ARCA Racing Series at Chicagoland in October 2009. Turner Motorsports then made their debut in the Camping World Truck Series later that month at Texas Motor Speedway with Scott Wimmer. The team proceeded to expand to two trucks for the 2010 season, with Ricky Carmichael and Buescher, and formed a technical alliance with Kevin Harvick Incorporated.

In September 2010, Turner acquired the four-car Nationwide Series team Braun Racing, one of the most successful non-Cup-affiliated teams in the series. Under Turner, the Nationwide program was switched from Toyota to Chevrolet for 2011, with all sponsors from Braun returning to the team. The organization also carried over the unique number logos used by Braun for all their teams (except the 38 car). In 2013 Harry Scott Jr., a North Carolina business man from the medical billing industry who became a minority owner in Braun Racing in 2009, increased his stake in the organization. The owner and president of Braun/Turner sponsor AccuDoc Solutions, Scott became the manager of the company's marketing, public relations and business development efforts, and the team was renamed Turner Scott Motorsports.

In August 2014, co-owners Turner and Scott filed lawsuits against each other, leading to the closure of the No. 30 truck driven by champion Ron Hornaday Jr. and the full-time NASCAR K&N Pro Series East team and part-time No. 33 truck both driven by Brandon Jones. Initially it had been reported that the entire Truck Series operation would be shuttered, and around 70 employees were dismissed on August 27 before being asked to return the next morning. Turner sought over $3 million and alleged that Scott didn't handle his responsibilities to make payments to vendors or address $2 million Scott owed to Turner. Scott alleged meanwhile that Turner allowed the team's funds to run dry and did not handle his obligations to fund the team's entries. At the end of the 2014 season, Scott split with Turner and took control of the No. 42 Nationwide (now Xfinity) series car as well as the entire K&N Pro Series East operation. The Xfinity operation was moved to Chip Ganassi Racing under the name HScott Motorsports with Chip Ganassi, while Scott partnered with driver Justin Marks to field the K&N Series program under the name HScott Motorsports with Justin Marks. The rest of TSM's equipment, including the entire Camping World Truck Series program, was sold and team employees were released following the end of the season. The team's Mooresville facility would be taken over by Richard Petty Motorsports.

== Sprint Cup Series ==
=== Car No. 50 history ===
In January 2012, it was announced that Turner Motorsports would field a No. 50 Chevrolet Impala in the Coke Zero 400 that July. The entry would be sponsored by Walmart, the company's first foray into NASCAR as a team sponsor, and driven by 1988 Champion Bill Elliott. The team utilized Hendrick Motorsports engines, and Trent Owens served as the crew chief. Elliott qualified in sixth position and showed competitive speed early, but was taken out in a late race crash, resulting in a 37th-place finish.

In late 2013, TSM co-owner Harry Scott Jr. purchased the Phoenix Racing Sprint Cup Series team based in Spartanburg, South Carolina. The team, renamed HScott Motorsports, began operating under Scott's ownership at Richmond in September 2013. Although he fielded TSM drivers Justin Allgaier and Kyle Larson, his Cup team is unconnected to TSM.

== Nationwide Series ==
For the Xfinity Series operations prior to Fall 2010, see Braun Motorsports. For the operations in the Xfinity Series following 2014, see Chip Ganassi Racing.

=== Car No. 30 history ===
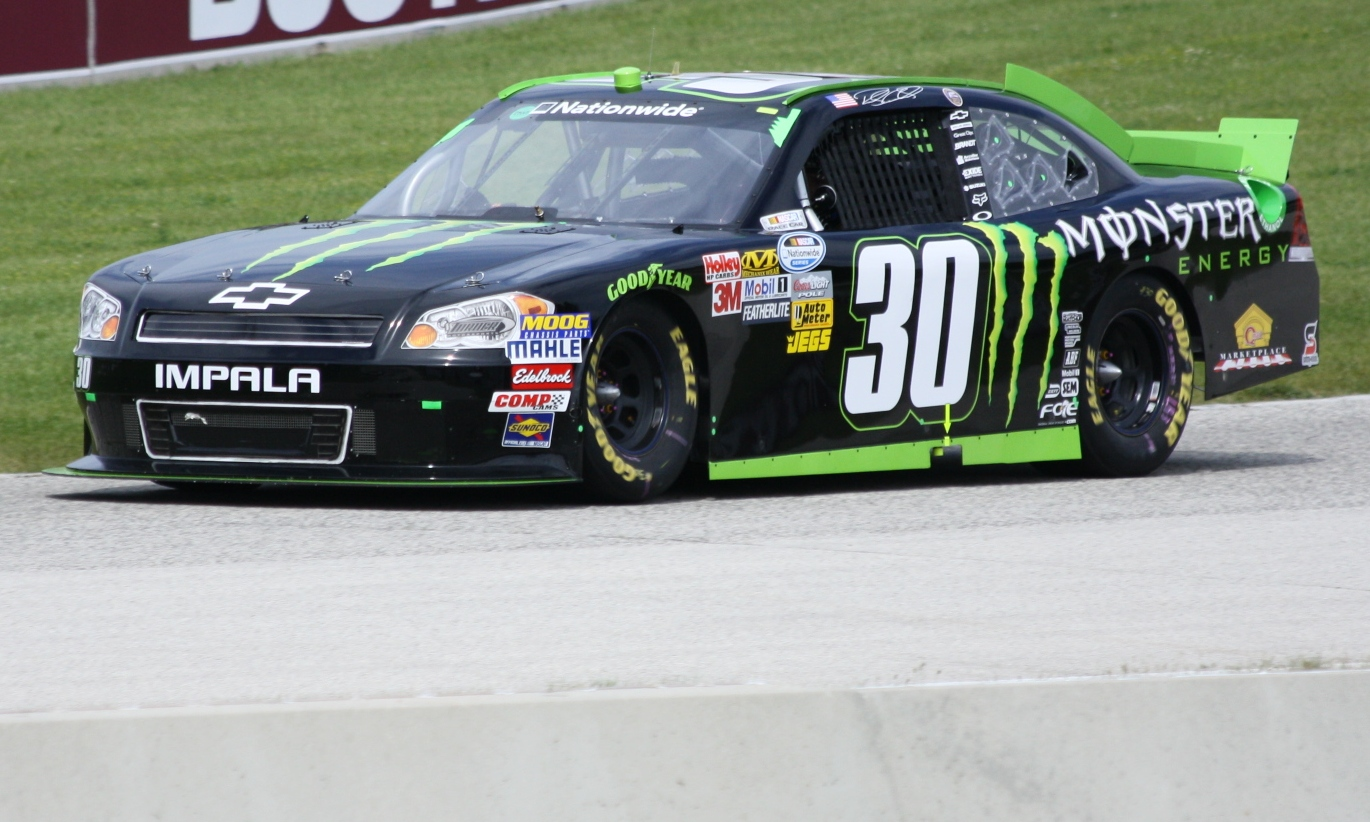
Ricky Carmichael in 2011.

This team began as the No. 10 Nesquik Chevrolet for ppc Racing back in the year 2000. It was purchased by Braun Racing after the closing of ppc in 2007. Even after being bought by Braun, the car continued as the No. 10, often competing part-time. Braun Racing had also run a No. 30 car in the past, winning at Rockingham Speedway in 2004 with Jamie McMurray.

After years of competing under the Braun Racing banner, Turner Scott Motorsports acquired the No. 10 team when they bought the team in September 2010. With Steve Turner now owning the team, Ricky Carmichael, James Buescher, Scott Wimmer, and Jason Leffler filled the seat for the remainder of the season.

Multiple drivers (2011)

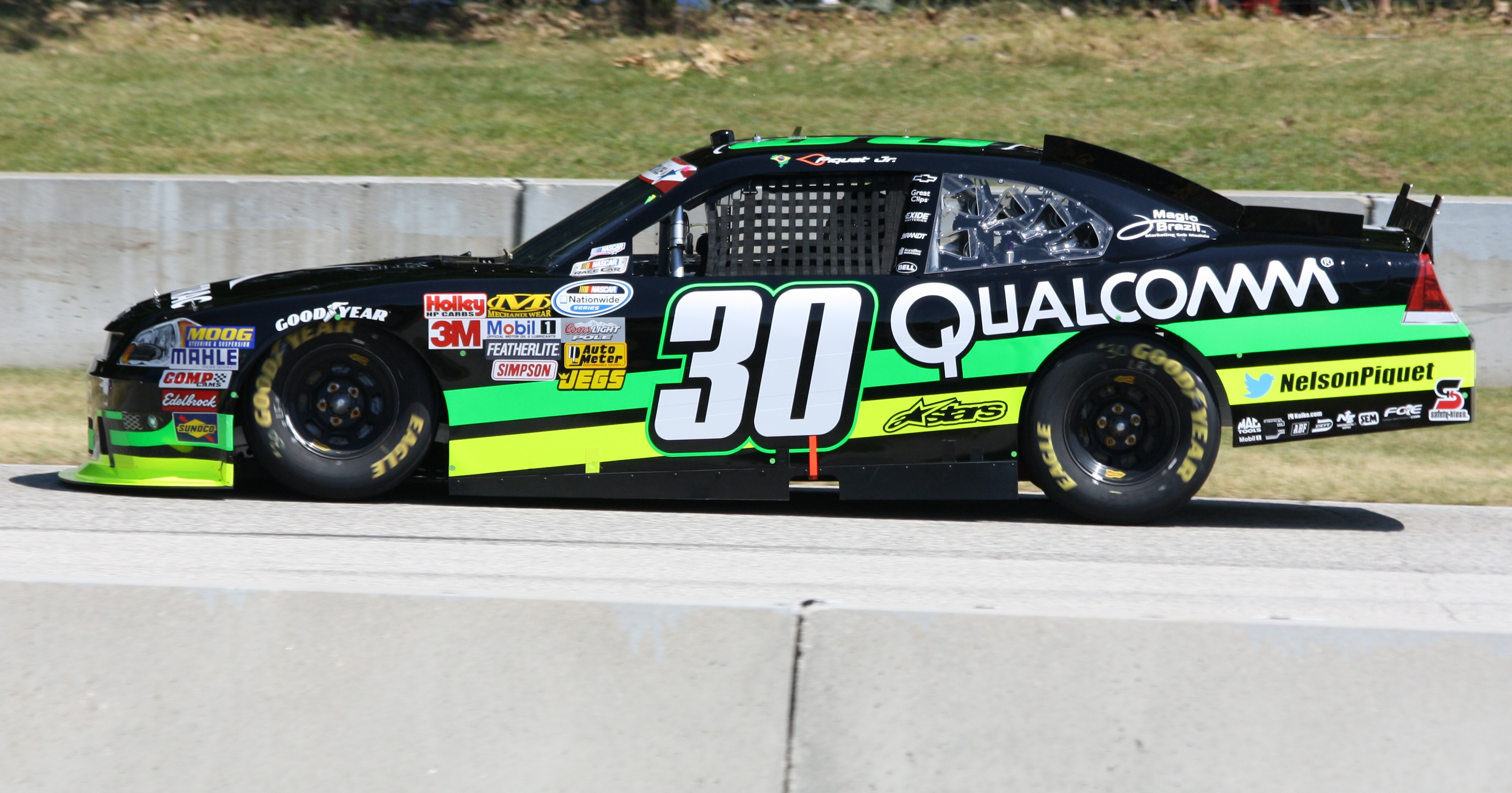
Nelson Piquet Jr.'s pole and race winning car at Road America in 2012.

In 2011, the team ran full-time as the No. 30 Chevrolet Impala with a multitude of drivers. Leffler drove the No. 30 with Accudoc Solutions, Wolfpack Rentals and Great Clips sponsoring the eight races that Kasey Kahne ran Leffler's normal No. 38. James Buescher drove in nine races with ABF Freight System, Fraternal Order of Eagles, Accudoc Solutions, Sporting Kansas City and Exide sponsoring the car. Ricky Carmichael drove the car with Monster Energy at Road America, Daytona, and Richmond. Ryan Newman drove the No. 30 with Dollar General on board at Phoenix. Reed Sorenson drove the No. 30 at Las Vegas, California, Michigan, and Kentucky with little success. Mikey Kile drove the No. 30 for five races with Accudoc and Battery Tender serving as sponsors. In addition to his driving duties in the No. 38 Turner Scott Motorsports car, Kahne drove the No. 30 entry at Charlotte in the spring and Chicagoland in the fall. Boris Said drove at Circuit Gilles Villeneuve with Great Clips sponsorship. Nelson Piquet Jr. drove the car at Homestead–Miami Speedway. Eddie Pardue stayed with Leffler when he transitioned between the No. 30 and No. 38, while Stewart Cooper worked with Kahne and the other drivers. The car ended up 18th in owner points with two top fives and 10 top 10s. The car's best run was at Lucas Oil Raceway when Buescher finished second.

James Buescher and others (2012)

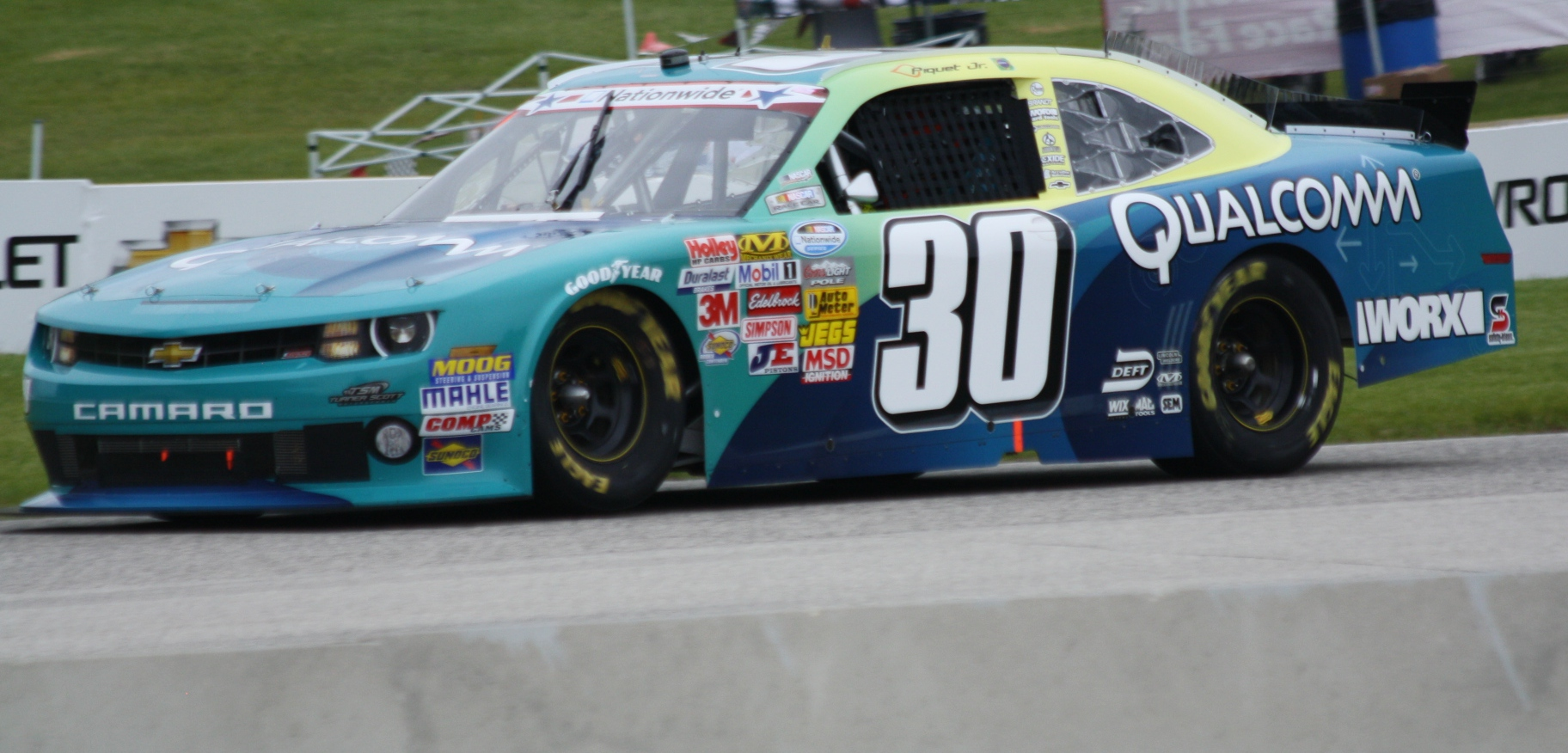
Nelson Piquet Jr. at Road America in 2013.

In 2012, the No. 30 team returned. Buescher drove the car for 20 races, winning the season opener in Daytona. Steve Arpin would drive at Texas and Iowa, while Nelson Piquet Jr. ended up winning at Road America. Leffler returned to the car at Iowa and Phoenix, Alex Bowman drove at Chicago and Dover. Miguel Paludo, Alex Tagliani, Newman, and Dakoda Armstrong each drove the car for one race apiece. The team would finish 11th in owner points.

Nelson Piquet Jr. (2013)

In 2013, Piquet drove the No. 30 full-time to compete for Rookie of the Year, scoring only five top-tens, and finishing 12th in points. In 2014, Danica Patrick ran the 30 in the DRIVE4COPD 300 at Daytona.

=== Car No. 31 history ===
Brian Scott and Braun Racing (2010)

This team was initially a part of the Braun Racing stable and debuted as the No. 11 Toyota Camry during the 2010 season with rookie Brian Scott running full-time. Brian Scott's family business Shore Lodge and Harry Scott Jr.'s AccuDoc Solutions served as the car's primary sponsors for a majority of the races. Scott's best finish with the team was a third-place effort at Chicagoland Speedway. Despite a somewhat successful season, Scott was released from the ride once Steve Turner bought the team in late September. Multiple drivers took over driving duties for the remainder of the season. James Buescher drove the car at Kansas, Fontana and Phoenix with Great Clips and Rexall sponsoring. David Reutimann drove with Rexall on the hood at Charlotte, Texas, and Homestead. Brad Sweet drove at Gateway with Great Clips sponsoring.

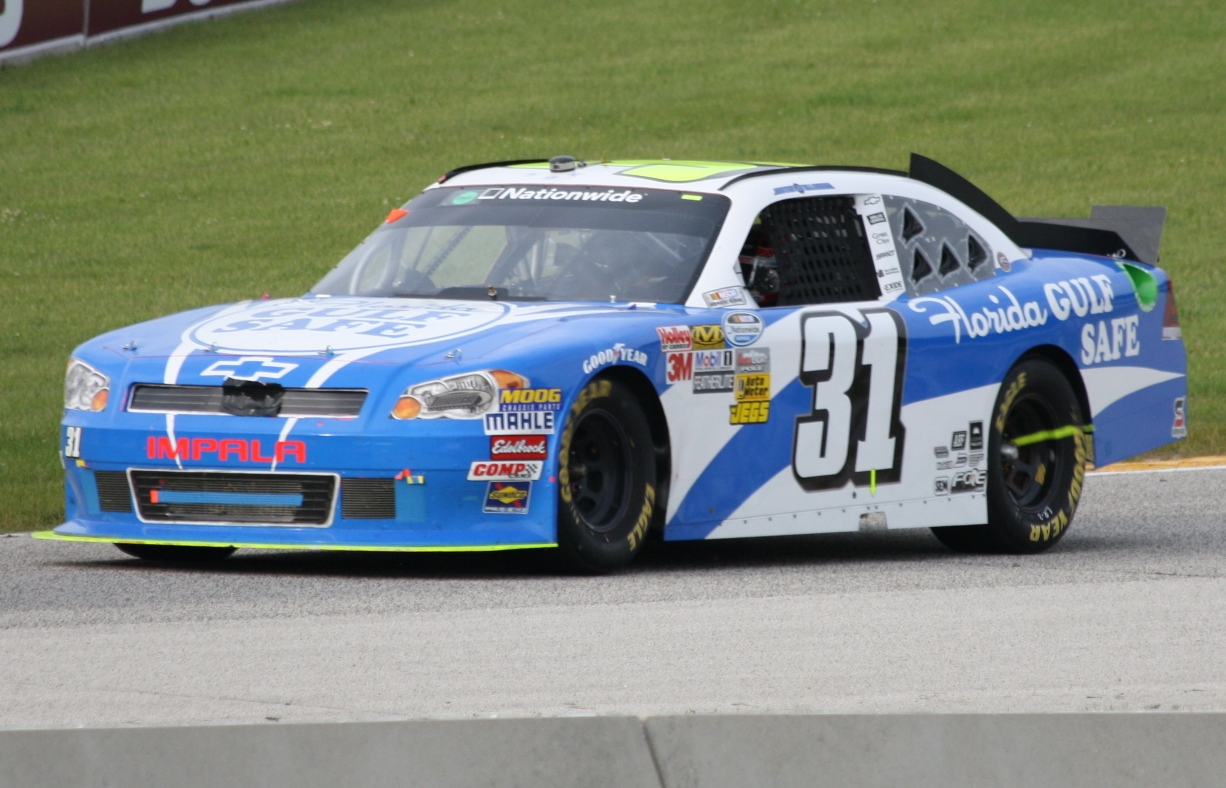
Justin Allgaier's Florida Gulf Safe Chevy that nearly won at Road America in 2011

Justin Allgaier (2011-2013)

The team continued to run under the Turner stable in 2011, rebranded as the No. 31 Chevrolet Impala. Former Penske Racing driver Justin Allgaier drove the car full-time, and BRANDT Agriculture (headquartered in Allgaier's native Illinois) served as the team's primary sponsor for a majority of the season. For the races that BRANDT was not on the hood, the No. 31 was instead sponsored by Wolfpack Rentals, Chevrolet, SEM, Deft Finishes, Trademark Nitrogen, Florida Gulf Safe, Dollar General and RACERSITES.

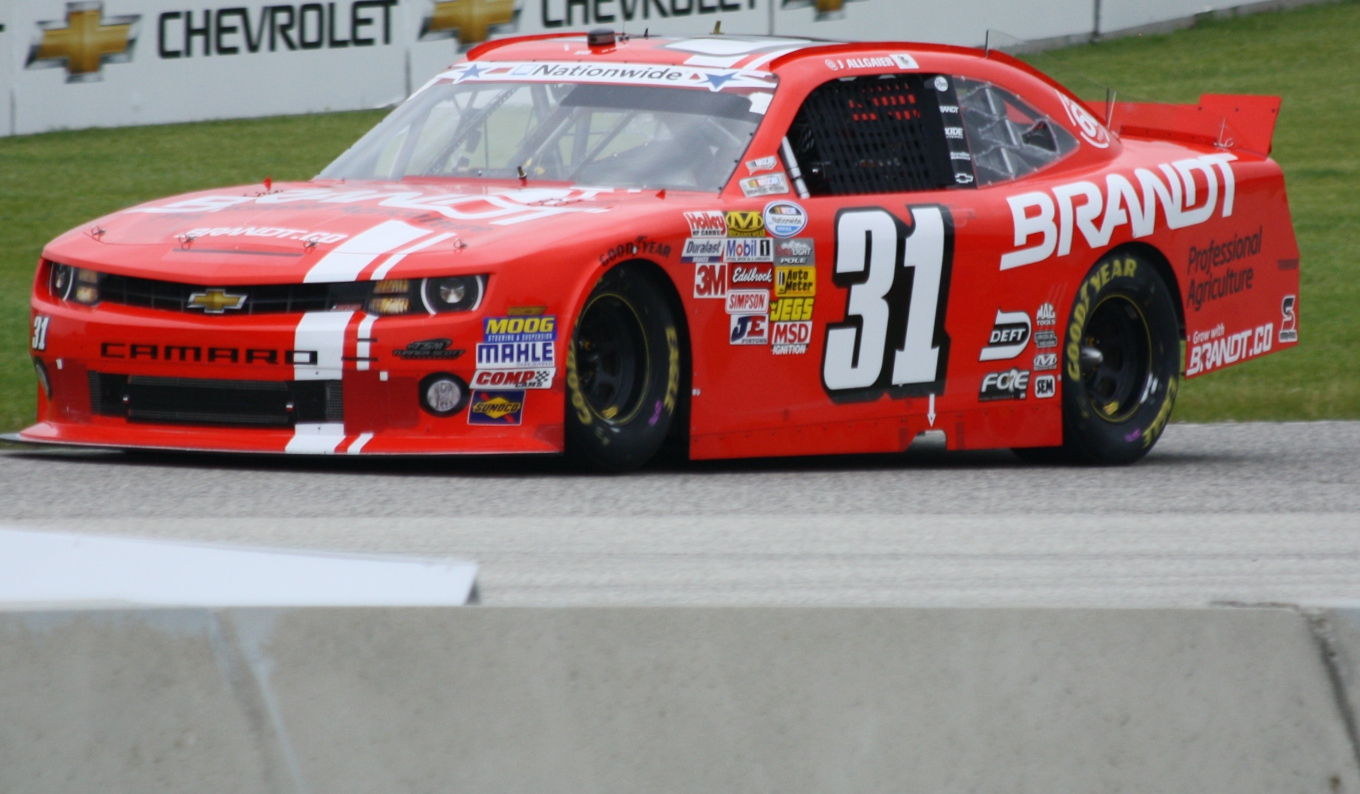
Allgaier's BRANDT Agriculture Chevy at Road America in 2013

Justin Allgaier and the No. 31 team had an up and down year until earning a victory at Chicagoland Speedway. The race was won on fuel mileage when, with half a lap to go, leader Carl Edwards ran out of gas. Allgaier, who had been running second, passed Edwards. Going through the final corner, the No. 31 ran out of gas as well, but managed to have enough momentum to win the race. Allgaier finished the season third in driver points with six top fives and 17 top-tens. The No. 31 team finished eighth in owner points.

Allgaier and BRANDT returned for 2012. Allgaier stayed in the top five in points for most of the season. The team grabbed its first win of the year at Circuit Gilles Villeneuve. On the last lap, Canadian Jacques Villeneuve had slowed to conserve fuel, allowing Allgaier to pull the bump-and-run and pass Villeneuve for the win.

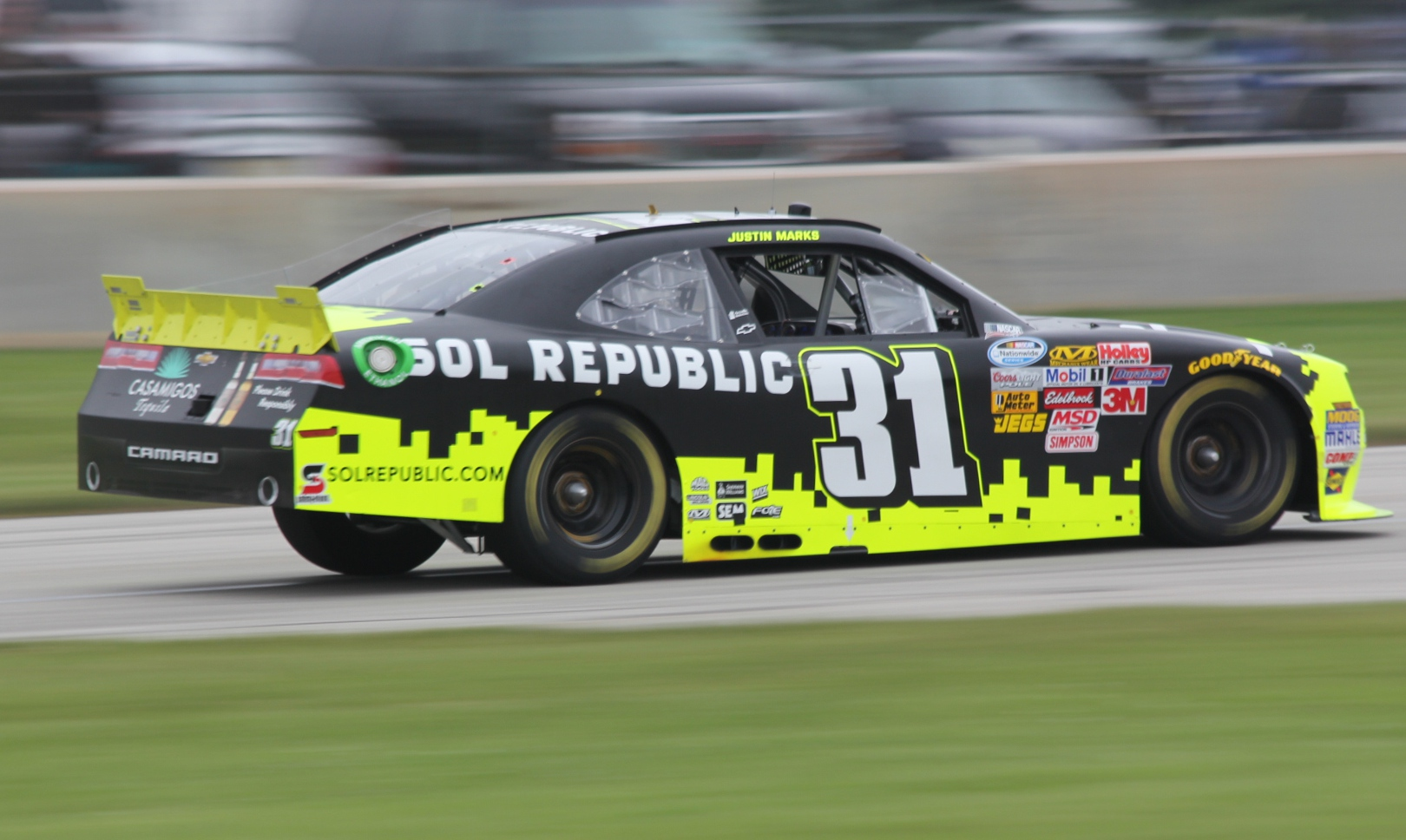
Justin Marks driving at Road America in 2014.

For 2013, Allgaier and BRANDT returned. It was announced in January 2013 that Scott Zipadelli would come on board as crew chief from RAB Racing. Though Allgaier would not win in 2013, he would finish fifth in points. Allgaier would move up to HScott Motorsports, run by co-owner Harry Scott Jr., in the Sprint Cup Series for the following season.

Dylan Kwasniewski (2014)

In 2014, Dylan Kwasniewski moved up from the NASCAR K&N Pro Series East to drive the No. 31, bringing longtime sponsor Rockstar Energy, and running for Rookie of the Year. AccuDoc Solutions and Fraternal Order of Eagles acted as co-sponsors. Pat Tryson was announced as the crew chief, but was replaced mid-season with Shannon Rursch. With Kwasniewski running the No. 42 in standalone races, Chase Pistone replaced him in the No. 31 in the three Nationwide Series standalone oval races, while Justin Marks ran the car in the two Nationwide Series standalone road course races. Kwasnewski won the pole at the season opening DRIVE4COPD 300 and earned three top-tens, often showing speed on the track. His rookie season, however, was marred by several crashes leading to four "Did Not Finishes" and an 11th-place points finish. The 31 team, meanwhile, finished 16th in owners points.

2014 driver rotation
No. 31 Driver	Races
Dylan Kwasniewski (R)	28
Chase Pistone	3
Justin Marks	2

=== Car No. 34 history ===
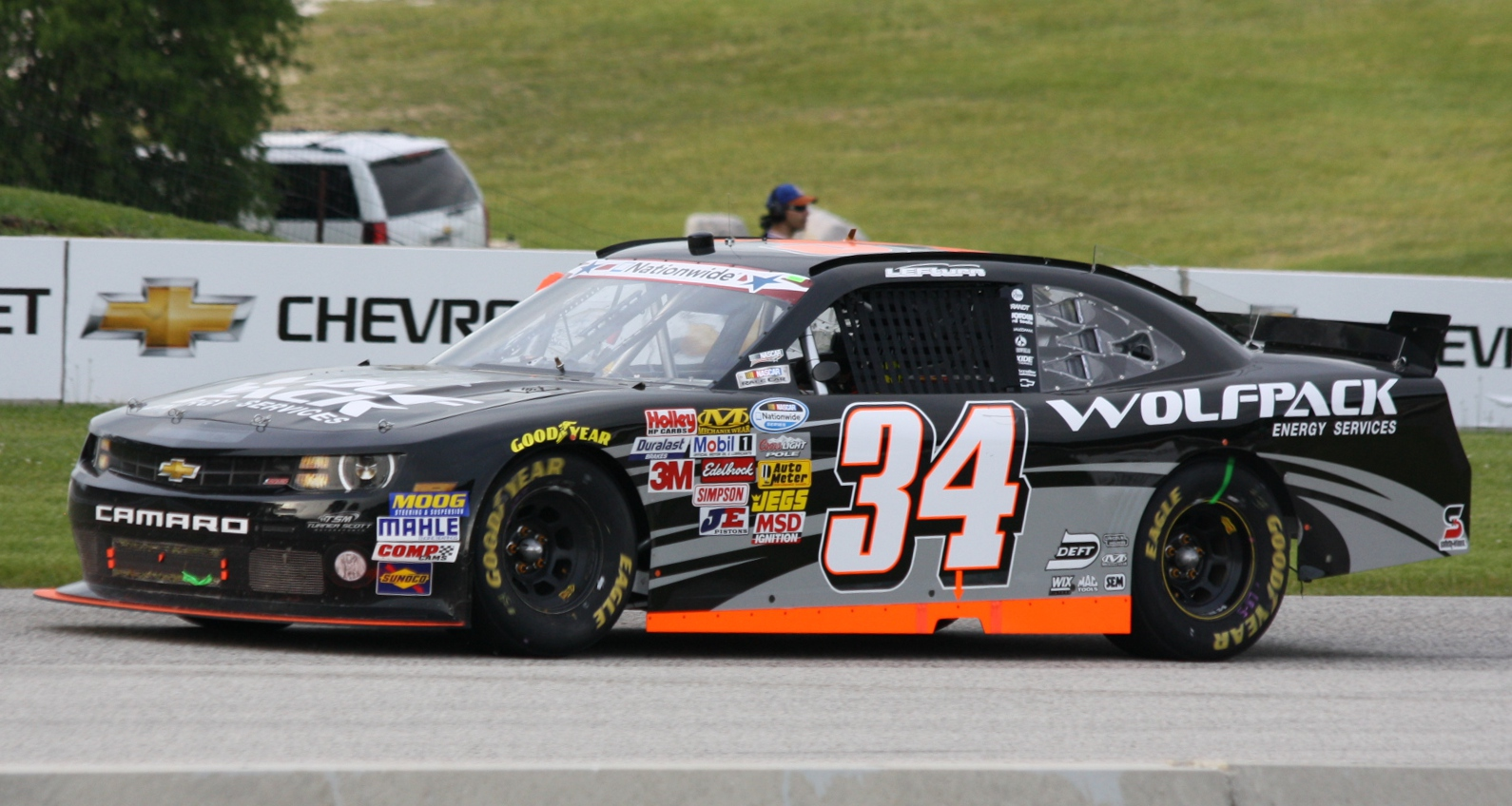
James Buescher at Road America in 2013.

The No. 34 Chevrolet Impala saw its first bit of action at Bristol Motor Speedway in March 2011 with Exide on the hood and James Buescher in the cockpit, bringing home a solid 13th-place finish. At Phoenix in November, Ricky Carmichael drove the No. 34 with Monster Energy sponsorship to a 15th-place finish.

The No. 34 returned in 2013 as the fourth car, replacing the No. 38 team that ran in 2012. Danica Patrick drove at Daytona International Speedway but fell out early from a blown engine. The No. 34 team returned at Talladega, with Patrick once again behind the wheel, but was taken out on lap 16 by her teammate Kyle Larson, and would finish 39th. The team's third start came at Road America with James Buescher, who would finish 14th. Buescher and the No. 34 team would return to Daytona in July, where Buescher would finish a surprising second to race winner Matt Kenseth. The team's next stop was Kentucky with Jeb Burton, making his Nationwide series debut, behind the wheel. Burton would finish an impressive eighth. The team's last two starts were Kansas, and Charlotte in October, with Buescher, who would finish 15th, and 11th respectively.

=== Car No. 38 history ===
Jason Leffler (2006-2011)

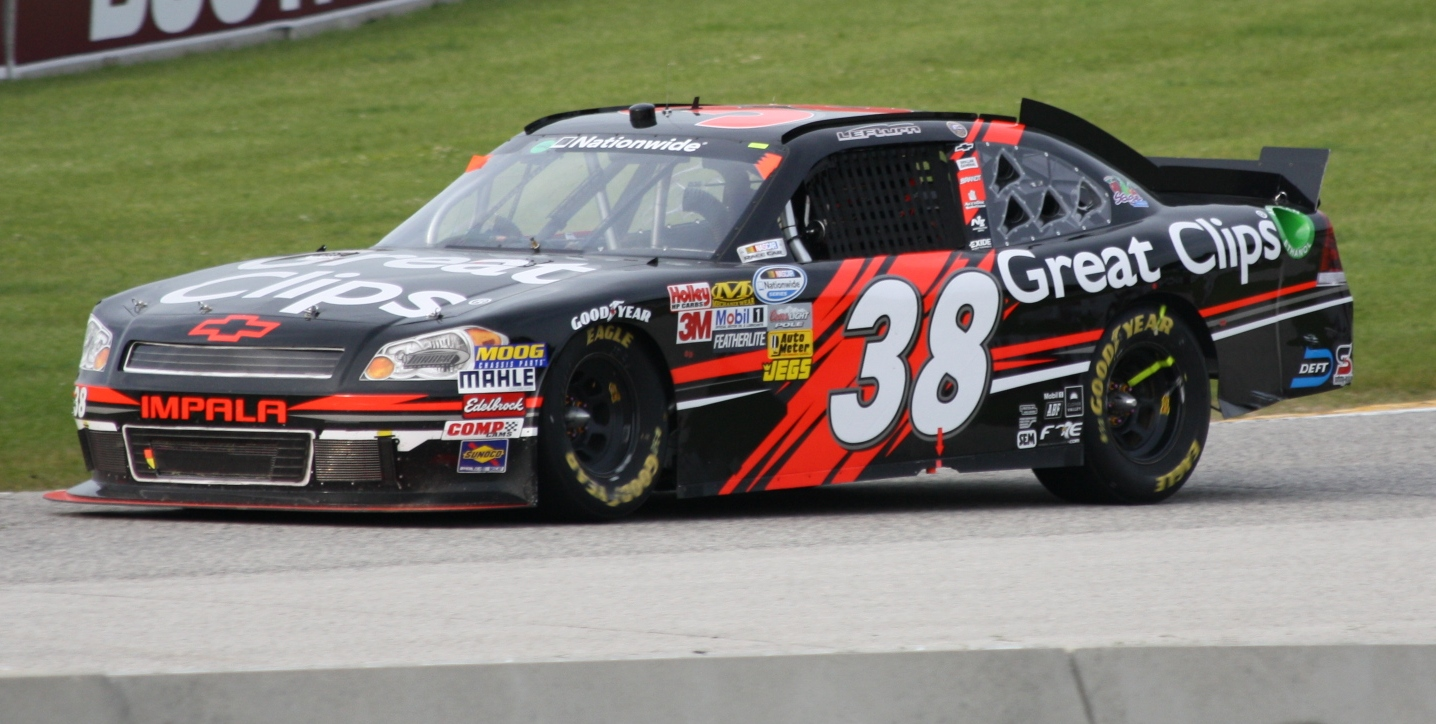
Leffler's car at Road America in 2011.

The No. 38 team can trace its roots back to the defunct Akins Motorsports, which was affiliated with Ford Cup team Robert Yates Racing. Great Clips had sponsored the team since 2001. It switched over to Dodge in 2004 along with its driver Kasey Kahne (who moved from Ford to Dodge factory team Evernham Motorsports in the Cup Series). Akins formed a collaboration with Braun Racing (which was a Chevy team) in 2006 as Braun-Akins Racing, before being taken over by Braun later in the season and switching to Chevy. From 2006 to 2011, Jason Leffler drove the No. 38, on either a part-time or full-time basis. In 2010, Leffler split the car with then-Richard Petty Motorsports driver Kasey Kahne (returning to the No. 38 and sponsor Great Clips) and finished out the season in the No. 10 car. The team was acquired when it was purchased by Turner Scott Motorsports in September 2010.

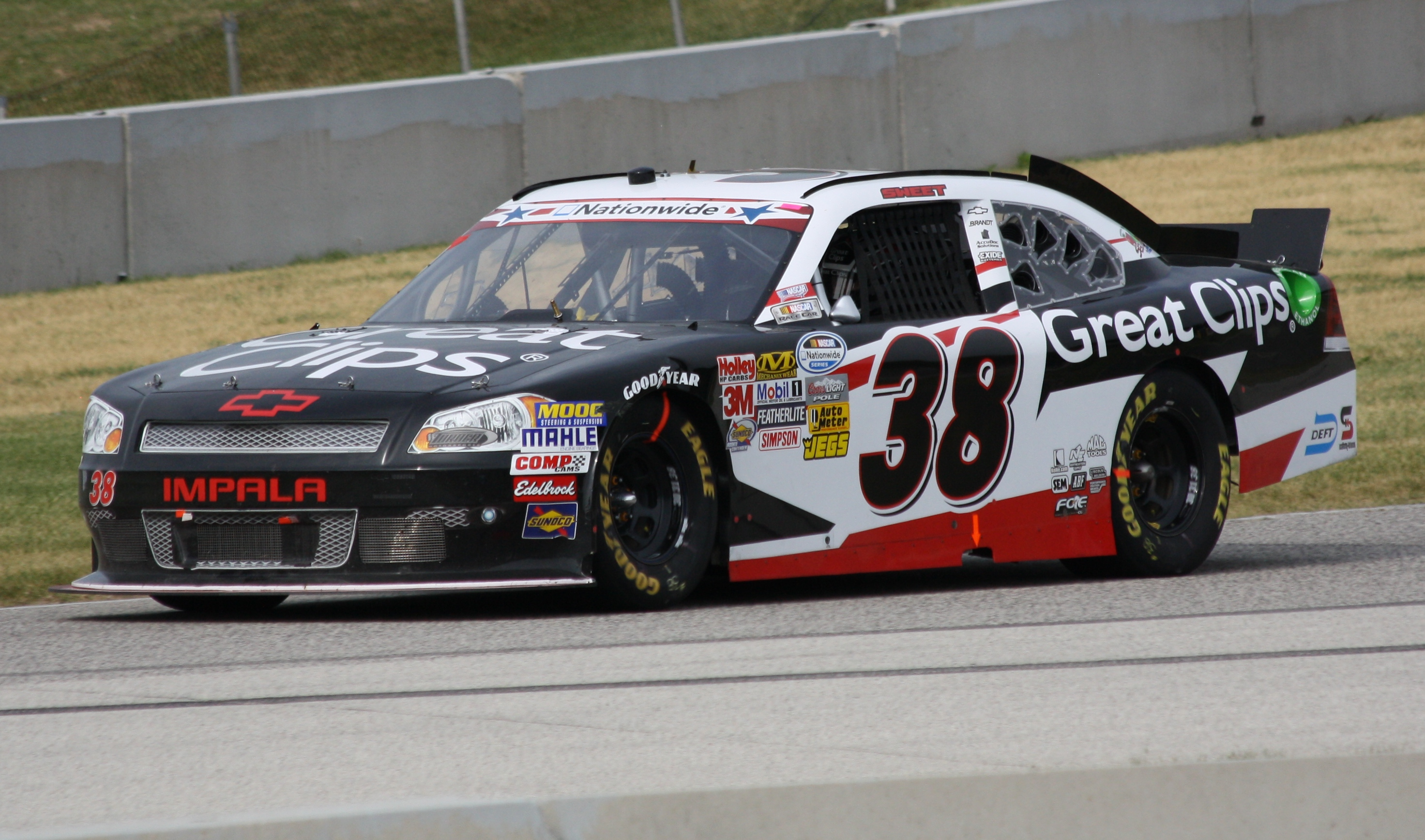
Brad Sweet at Road America in 2012.

Under Turner for 2011, Kahne and Leffler again split the Great Clips No. 38, with Leffler running the No. 30 in the eight races when Kahne was driving this car. Eddie Pardue was crew chief for Leffler while Stewart Cooper was crew chief for Kahne. The team had a pair of second-place finishes during the season with Kahne at Bristol Motor Speedway and Leffler at Daytona International Speedway. The car finished 11th in owner points with five top-fives and 11 top-tens.

Kasey Kahne and Brad Sweet (2012)

Leffler was released at the end of 2011 in favor of an expanded season for Kahne and his USAC driver Brad Sweet, who ran for Rookie of the Year. The team's best finish was 2nd at Bristol by Kahne. After 2012, Kahne, Sweet, and Great Clips left Turner for JR Motorsports, ending Great Clips' long association with the No. 38.

Following Leffler's death in 2013, the No. 31 team ran a tribute scheme at Indianapolis Motor Speedway, with Great Clips and a No. 38 logo featured on the car and a scheme resembling the one Leffler ran in 2011.

=== Car No. 42 history ===
Mark Martin celebrates earning the No. 32 team's first victory in 2011 at Las Vegas.

The No. 42 team started off as the No. 32 team for Braun Racing, with Jason Leffler driving several stints for the team. The team was acquired when it was purchased by Turner Scott Motorsports.

Reed Sorenson (2011)

In 2011, Reed Sorenson, who had driven the No. 32 in seasons past, drove the Dollar General Chevrolet Impala in 30 races during the season, while Mark Martin drove at Las Vegas, California, Michigan, and Kentucky.

In March 2011, Mark Martin gave Turner Scott Motorsports its first victory in the Nationwide at Las Vegas. The victory came after Brad Keselowski, who was leading on the last lap, blew his tire. Martin, who was running in the second position, inherited the lead from Keselowski and held on to the top spot to ultimately achieve the victory. Then, in June of the same year, Sorenson gave the No. 32 team its second victory at Road America. After teammate Justin Allgaier and his No. 31 team ran out of gas as the race was ending under caution, Ron Fellows sped past Sorensen under caution. After a review by NASCAR officials, it was found that Sorenson maintained proper caution speed and was therefore awarded with the race victory.

Sorensen was released with five races left in 2011. Brian Vickers (Kansas, Charlotte and Texas), Ron Hornaday Jr. (Phoenix) and James Buescher (Homestead) filled out the remaining races. Even with the changes, the car finished seventh in owner points with eight top-fives and 24 top-tens. Dollar General left after the season for Joe Gibbs Racing leaving the No. 32 team without a sponsor or driver for 2012. Turner Scott later shut down the No. 32 team and gave the team's owner points to Richard Petty Motorsports' Nationwide Series team.

2011 driver rotation
32
Reed Sorenson	25
Mark Martin	4
Brian Vickers	3
Ron Hornaday	1
James Buescher	1

In 2012, Miguel Paludo made the team's only start in 2012 at Road America, finishing in 29th place.

Kyle Larson (2013-2014)

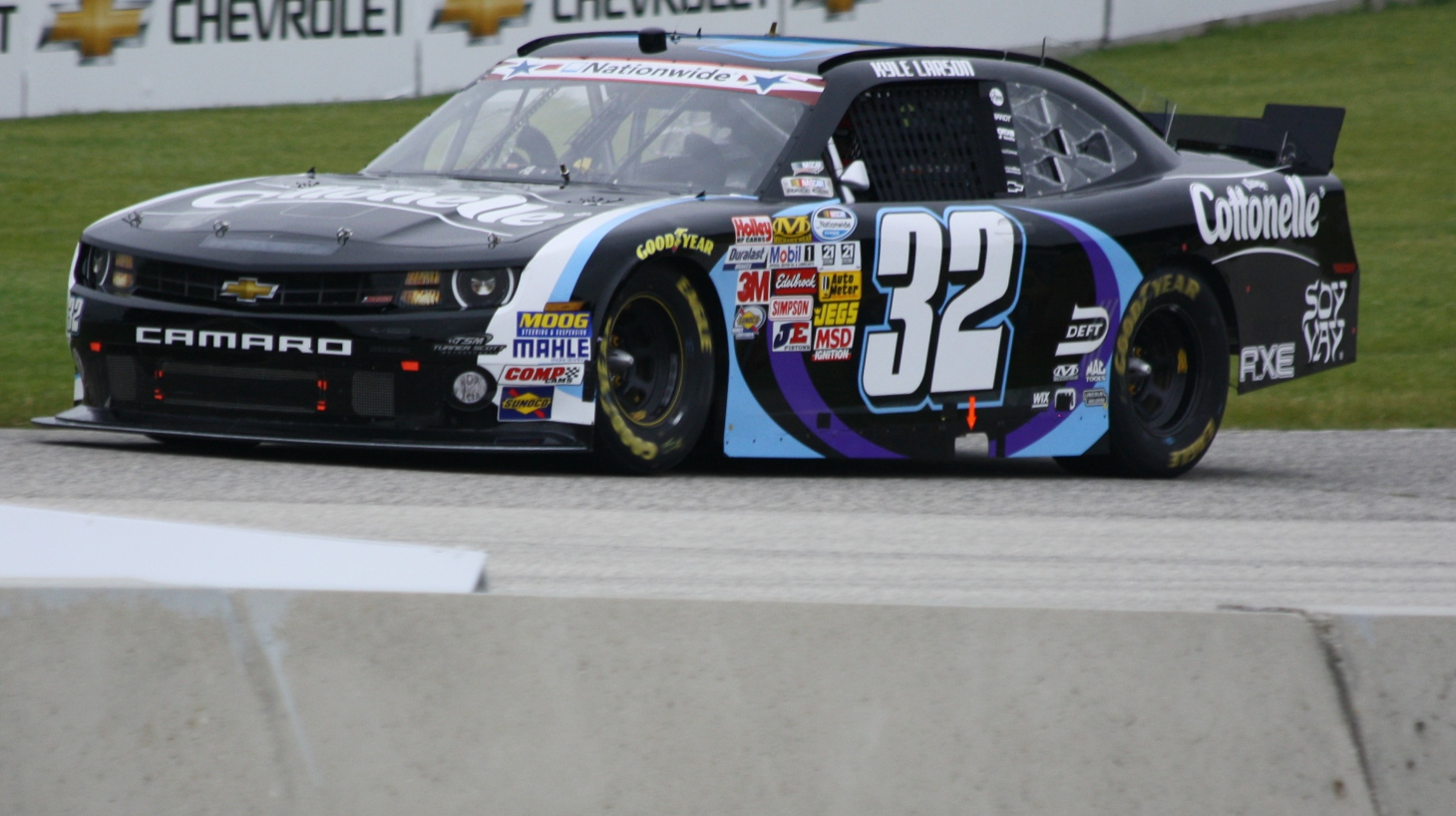
Rookie of the Year Kyle Larson at Road America in 2013.

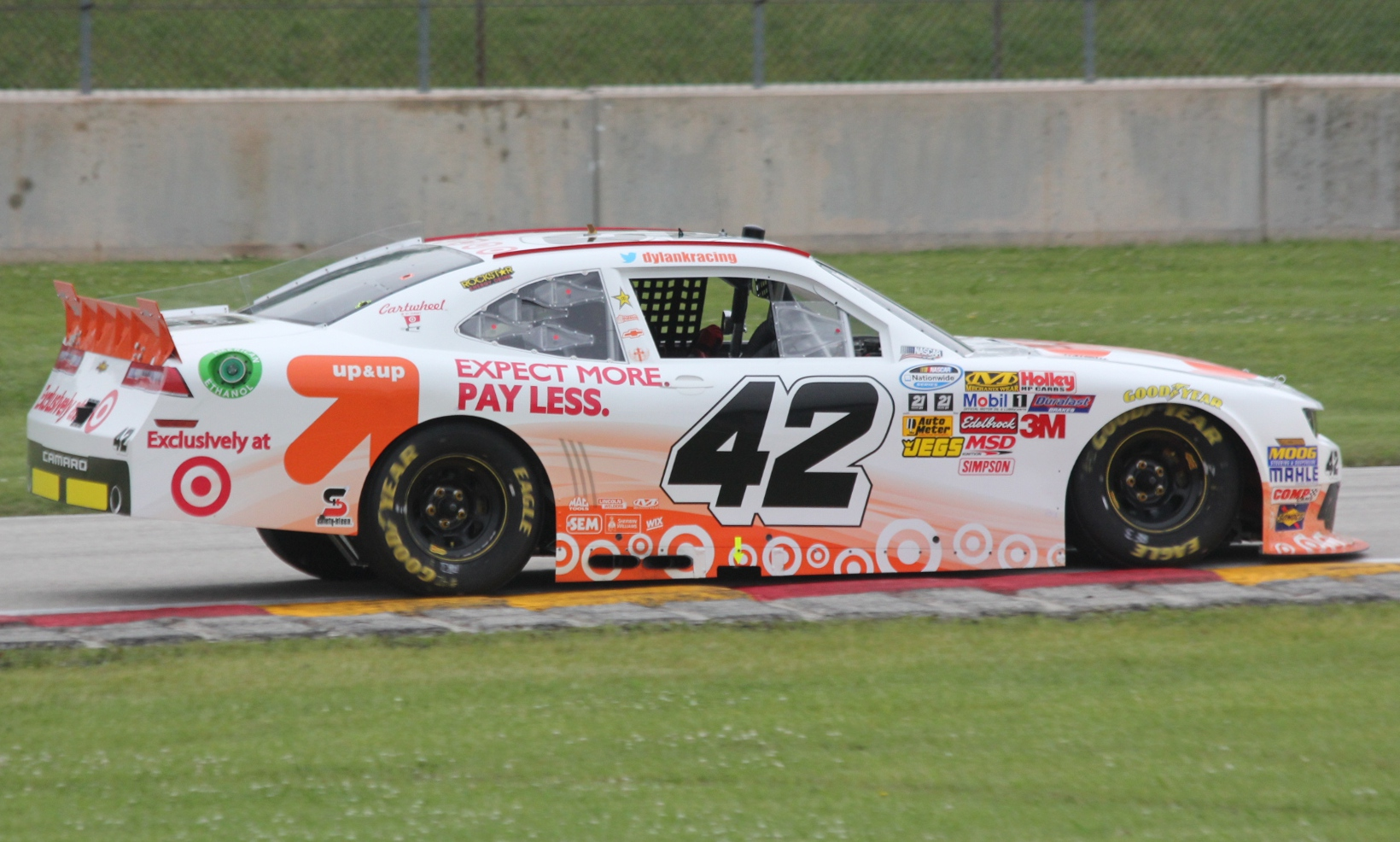
Dylan Kwasniewski's up&up Camaro at Road America in 2014.

In 2013, Earnhardt Ganassi Racing's development driver, Kyle Larson was signed to drive the No. 32 Chevrolet Camaro full-time. Despite having never driven a Nationwide car before, and after being involved in early wrecks, Larson finished second to Kyle Busch at Bristol. Larson would claim Rookie of the Year honors that year, and would later move up to the Sprint Cup Series with Ganassi.

Larson returned to drive the renumbered No. 42 Target Cartwheel Camaro in 2014 for all races that were in support of Cup Series events. Fellow Ganassi driver Dylan Kwasniewski replaced Larson in the No. 42 during Nationwide Series standalone events, funded by Target's up & up brand. On March 22, 2014, Larson won the Treatmyclot.com 300, holding off Kyle Busch and Kevin Harvick for the win. In victory lane, Larson stated, "Those last 11, 12 laps were the longest laps of my life. I've been so close to winning so many times, but the fashion we did it in was extra special." Larson celebrated by doing burnouts in the infield without his steering wheel engaged. Larson finished the season with two wins, a pole, 14 top-fives, and 21 top-tens, and the 42 team finished fourth in owner points.

2014 driver rotation
No. 42 Driver	Races
Kyle Larson	28
Dylan Kwasniewski (R)	5

HScott Motorsports with Chip Ganassi (2015–present)

At the end of 2014, crew chief Scott Zipadelli was released from the team. In December 2014, it was announced that Chip Ganassi Racing would partner with Harry Scott to bring the 42 car in-house under the name HScott Motorsports with Chip Ganassi, with Larson and Kwasniewski sharing the ride.

== Camping World Truck Series ==
=== Truck No. 4 History ===
Ricky Carmichael pulling out of pit road at Daytona in 2011.

Ricky Carmichael (2010-2011)

Originally the No. 4 team was part of the Kevin Harvick Incorporated stable, set to run full-time in 2009 with rookie Ricky Carmichael splitting time with other drivers. However, Carmichael left KHI in order to run full-time and not have to split the ride with others after 2009. Beginning with the 2010 season, the No. 4 team ran with Carmichael as its driver under the Turner Motorsports banner in an alliance with KHI. The season's results were mixed, but fairly successful at times. The team finished 13th in points with three top fives, nine top-tens and a best finish of fourth. The team continued in 2011 with Carmichael and Monster Energy, but struggled for most of the year with results and consistency. Carmichael earned his first pole at Atlanta Motor Speedway and had one top five, seven top-tens and a best finish of fourth. Carmichael finished 16th in driver points and the team finished 18th in owner points before departing from Turner Motorsports at the conclusion of the season.

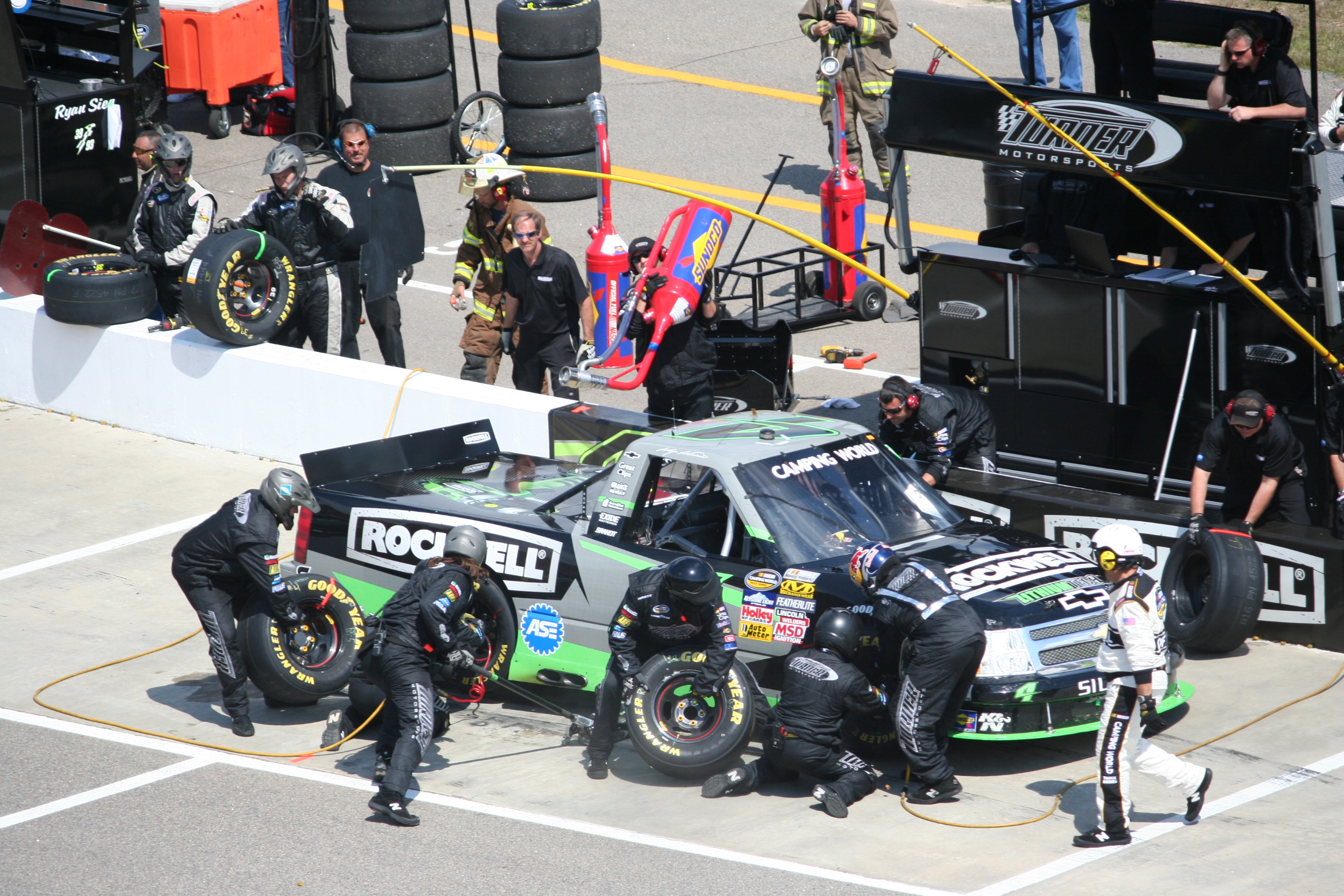
Kasey Kahne in 2012.

Multiple Drivers (2012)

The No. 4 team returned in 2012 for the Rockingham race where Kasey Kahne raced the No. 4 Truck for Rockwell Tools. Brad Sweet qualified the truck while Kahne was in Texas. When Kahne made it to Rockingham, he had to start from the back in 36th. He won the race. Earnhardt Ganassi Racing development driver Kyle Larson drove the No. 4 at Kentucky and Atlanta, Short track driver Augie Grill made his series debut at Iowa, and former ThorSport Racing driver Dakoda Armstrong drove the truck at Kentucky. K&N Pro Series East Champion Larson returned in the final two races of the season, finishing second at Phoenix and running strong at Homestead before crashing while battling for position with Ty Dillon.

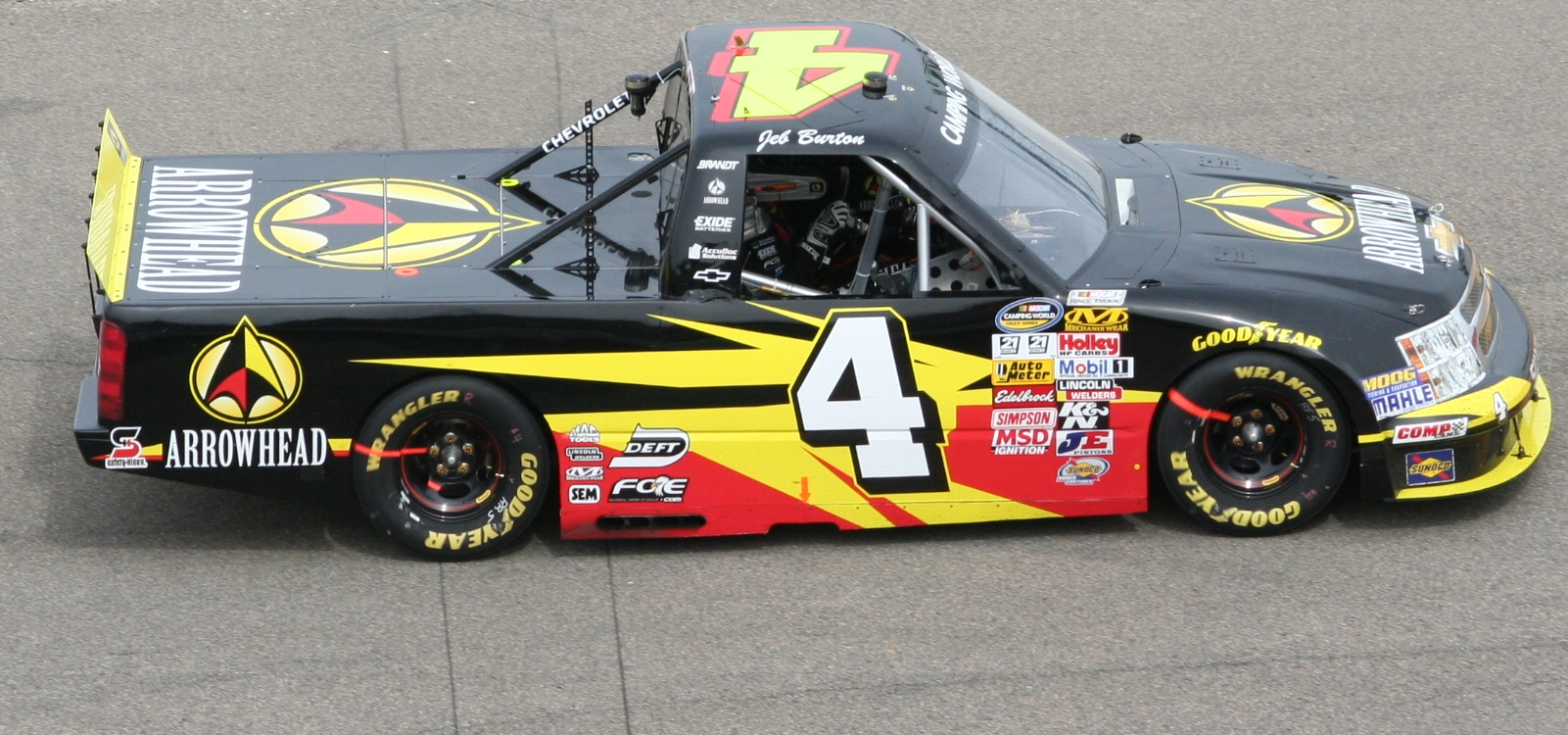
Jeb Burton at Rockingham in 2013.

Jeb Burton (2013)

Jeb Burton, son of former Cup driver Ward Burton, was signed to drive the truck full-time in 2013 for Rookie of the Year, with sponsorship from Virginia-based Arrowhead Electronic Cigarettes. His crew chief Mike Hillman Jr. would move over with him from Hillman Racing. In April 2013, Burton won his first Truck Series pole at Martinsville Speedway, and on June 7, 2013, Burton won the WinStar World Casino 400K at Texas Motor Speedway, his first career NASCAR series win. Burton would continue to impress throughout the season, winning seven poles and finishing fifth in points. While Burton was set to continue into 2014 and appeared at preseason testing at Daytona, sponsor Arrowhead defaulted on its payments six weeks before the season opener, forcing the team to release Burton and shut down the 4 truck.

=== Truck No. 30 History ===
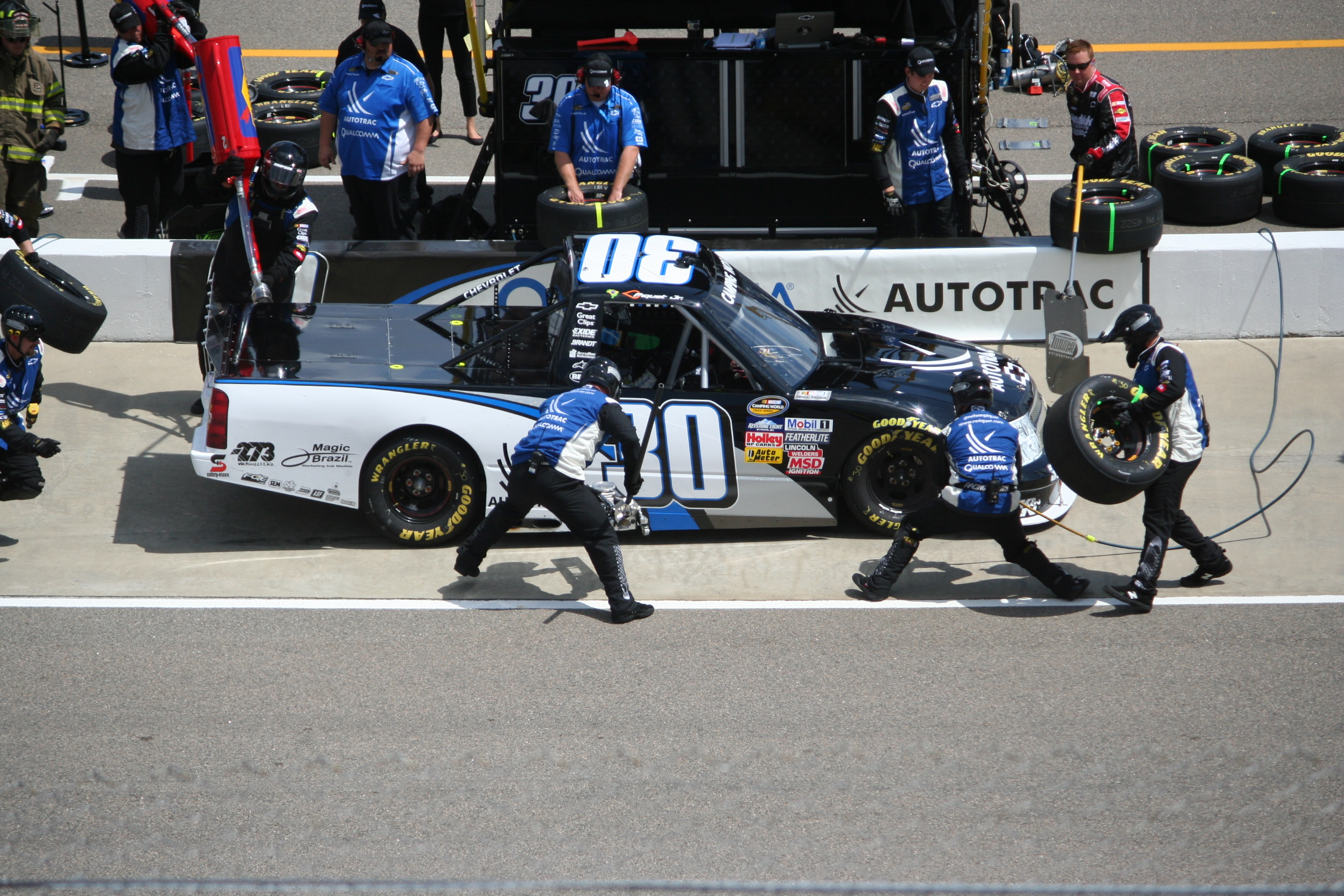
Nelson Piquet Jr. in 2012.

Nelson Piquet Jr. (2012)

Following the departure of Ricky Carmichael, the No. 4 team transitioned to the No. 30 and Nelson Piquet Jr. and crew chief Chris Carrier were brought over from KHI to drive the No. 30 truck in 2012 with sponsorship from Qualcomm and Autotrac. Piquet Jr. scored two wins at Michigan and Las Vegas, finishing seventh in points.

Multiple drivers (2013)

With Piquet Jr. moving up to the Nationwide Series, Ryan Truex signed to drive the 30 truck at Daytona with sponsorship from Bass Pro Shops. Truex would finish 29th after getting involved in a late wreck. Piquet returned to the truck at Martinsville Speedway, finishing 19th. Kyle Larson drove the truck to victory in dominating fashion at Rockingham Speedway. Cale Gale, signed as a crew chief for development driver Brandon Jones, made his first start of the season in the truck at Kentucky in June with longtime sponsor Rheem. Gale would finish 13th. Larson returned to the team for the inaugural Mudsummer Classic at Eldora Speedway, finishing second to Austin Dillon. The team's next start was Pocono with Todd Bodine, who would finish 11th. Ben Kennedy would drive the No. 30 truck at Chicagoland Speedway, finishing 16th. Kennedy's next start was Martinsville where he would finish a surprising fourth. The team returned with Kennedy to Homestead–Miami Speedway for the final race of the season. Kennedy would fall out with a blown engine.

Ron Hornaday Jr. (2014)

In 2014, four-time Champion Ron Hornaday was signed to drive the season opener at Daytona, with Rheem and Rudd sponsoring his efforts. Hornaday finished fifth after starting second. Hornaday and the 30 team ended up attempting the full season on a race-to-race basis, with Rheem sponsoring "any of Ron's races that (the team) were unable to find backing for." He was running third in points following Bristol when TSM announced that it would not run Hornaday and the 30 at Canadian Tire Motorsport Park. On September 2, TSM further announced the shutdown of the No. 30 team, laying off 18 employees, while Rheem would move over to NTS Motorsports with Hornaday and Austin Dillon.

=== Truck No. 31 History ===
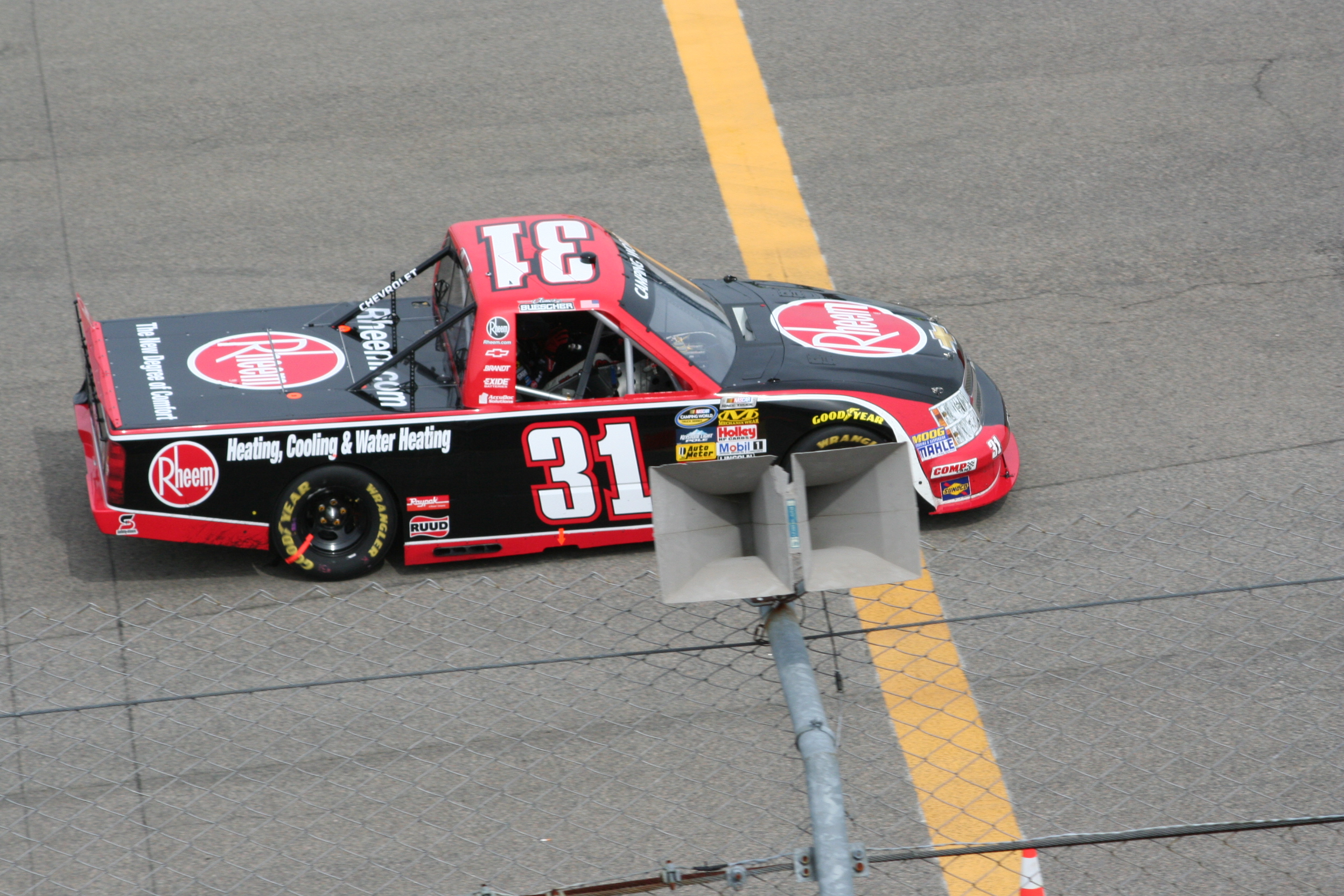
James Buescher (pictured in 2013) won the 2012 Camping World Truck Series Championship.

Turner Motorsports began racing in mid-2009 with its No. 31 entry driven by Scott Wimmer. In November of the same year, Ricky Carmichael decided to race with Turner Motorsports in 2010, and was able to run the No. 31 for the last few races of the season.

James Buescher (2010-2013)

In 2010, with Ricky Carmichael moving over to the No. 4 entry, the team initially planned to run a limited schedule with driver James Buescher, who was running full-time in the Nationwide Series for Phoenix Racing. However, after funding ran out for his Nationwide Series ride, James Buescher was able to move over and finish out the remainder of the season in the Camping World Truck Series with the No. 31. The team found quite a bit of success, being in contention to win races on some occasions. Despite missing the first four races of the season, James Buescher and the No. 31 team managed to finish just outside the top-ten in the driver points while the truck finished 15th in owner points with six top fives and ten top-tens and two second-place finishes.

Turner Scott Motorsports fielded the No. 31 for James Buescher once again during the 2011 season. Wolfpack Rentals continued to be the primary sponsor of the entry and was joined this season by new sponsor Exide, which left Randy Moss Motorsports at the conclusion of 2010 in favor of sponsoring the No. 31 for a partial schedule. Space Coast Center, Dollar General, RACERSITES and Bad Boy Mowers also sponsored the truck for one race each.

After failing to qualify for the second race of the season, Buescher and the No. 31 made a huge comeback. The team finished a majority of the races in the top-ten and led the points late in the season before bad luck cost them the title. Buescher finished third in driver Points with three poles, ten top-fives, 19 top-tens and a best finish of second. Returning in 2012, Buescher improved dramatically, proving to be a dominant force on the 1.5-mile tracks, taking four wins, ten top-fives, and 14 top-tens to take home the Truck Series championship that year. Buescher returned for 2013 this time backed by Rheem, scoring two wins and 14 top-tens en route to a third-place points finish. In an unexpected move, Buescher announced that he would be leaving his father-in-law Steve Turner's team, taking his Rheem sponosrhip to the Toyota team RAB Racing in the Nationwide Series for the 2014 season.

Ben Kennedy (2014)

After running several races in the 30 truck in 2013, 21-year-old Ben Kennedy, great-grandson of NASCAR founder Bill France Sr. was signed to drive the 31 for 2014, competing for Rookie of the Year honors. Kennedy led opening practice at the Daytona opener, and earned the top starting spot based on this speed after qualifying was rained out. With sponsorship from the Florida Lottery and Whelen Engineering Company, Kennedy finished 15th. He would score a strong third-place finish the next week at Martinsville, his best finish of the year. After several races without sponsorship, the team signed Heater.com as a primary sponsor beginning at Iowa in June. Kennedy earned one top-five and seven top-ten finishes to beat part-time driver Tyler Reddick for Rookie of the Year honors. He would move to Red Horse Racing for 2015.

=== Truck No. 32 history ===
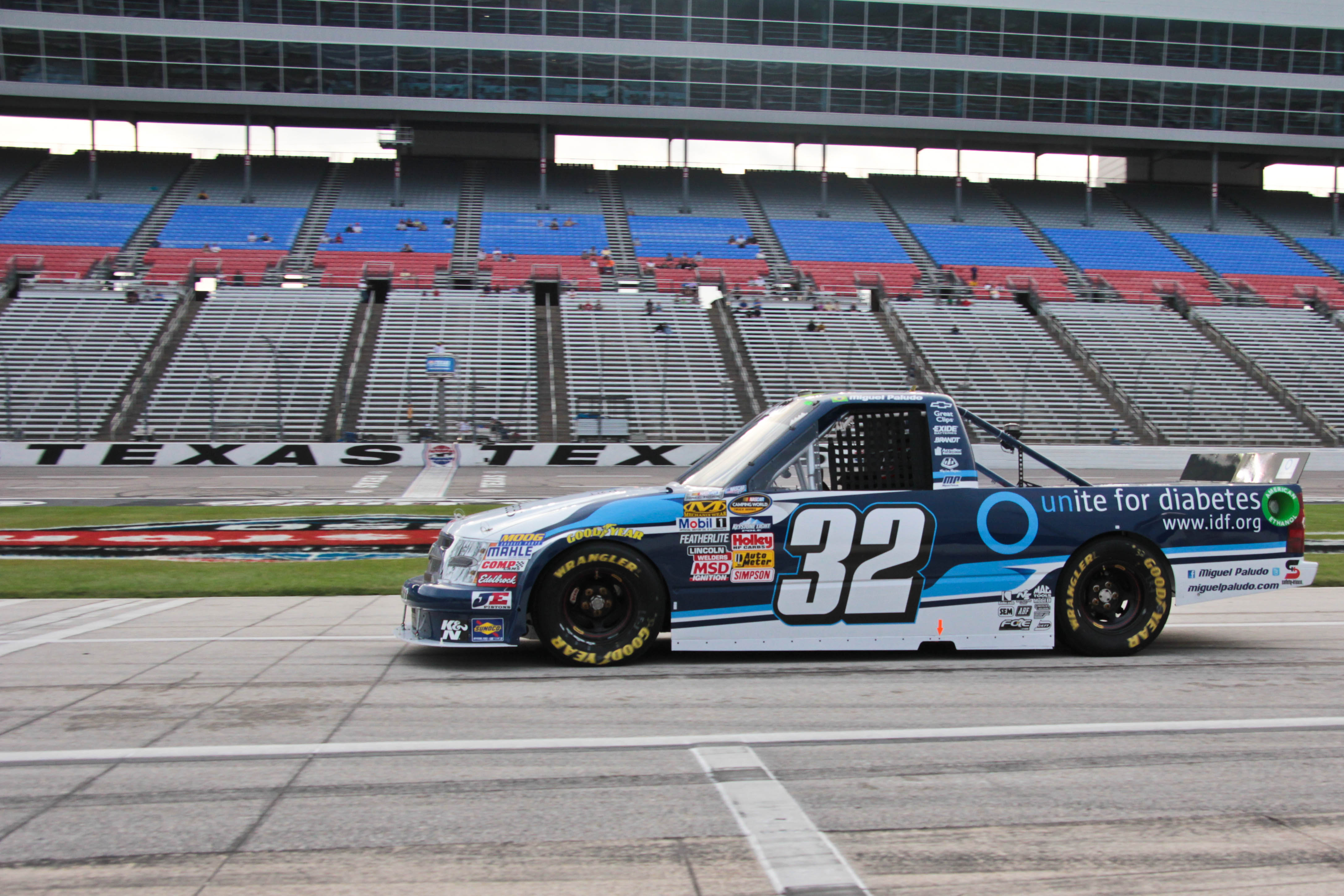
Miguel Paludo's No. 32 Unite for Diabetes/Duroline Chevrolet at Texas in 2012

Multiple drivers (2011)

The No. 32 Chevrolet Silverado is Turner Scott Motorsports' third Camping World Truck Series entry started in 2011. Driving duties were split between USAC driver Brad Sweet, who ran the first eight races of the year. Mark Martin drove at Michigan and Pocono with Exide, Steve Arpin ran at Texas, Iowa, Kentucky, LOR, and Chicago. Blake Feese would round out the season The team finished 19th in owner points with one top-five, four top-tens. Feese had the team's best finish of fourth at Atlanta Motor Speedway.

Miguel Paludo (2012-2013)

Miguel Paludo was signed for 2012 with sponsorship from Duroline Brakes and Components. Paludo started the season strong by dominating the season-opening Daytona race from the pole before being taken out in a crash. Paludo earned one top-five and five top-ten finishes with a best finish would be fifth at Homestead.

Paludo returned to the No. 32 Chevrolet Silverado for the 2013 season. He improved on his 2012 statistics, finishing ninth in points with four top-fives, 11 top-tens.

Multiple drivers (2014)

In 2014, the team returned for the full season running various different drivers, with Mike Hillman moving over from the No. 4 team to serve as crew chief. Ryan Truex drove the No. 32 truck, sponsored by Bass Pro Shops, at the NextEra Energy Resources 250 at Daytona (He drove the No. 30 with BPS the prior year). Truex would finish fourth. Seventeen-year-old Ben Rhodes signed to drive five races in the No. 32 with Alpha Energy Solutions, in addition to his K&N Pro Series East schedule. In his first race at Martinsville, he drove the truck to a strong eighth-place finish. Tayler Malsam signed on in May to compete in 12 truck races with sponsor Outerwall Inc starting at Kansas Speedway. Kyle Larson piloted the Glad Bags Silverado at Eldora. After racing hard with Bubba Wallace, he crashed running second with two laps to go, while Wallace went on to win. Larson returned with Target at Pocono, qualifying on the pole but finishing 18th.

2014 driver rotation
No. 32 Driver	Races
Tayler Malsam	12
Ben Rhodes	4
Kyle Larson	2
Cameron Hayley	2
Ryan Truex	1
Alex Guenette	1

=== Truck No. 33 History ===
Brandon Jones (2013-2014)

The No. 33 team made its debut at Bristol in August 2013 with 16-year-old Brandon Jones behind the wheel, finishing 27th. Jones would drive the truck at Iowa and Martinsville in September, finishing 20th and 19th. The No. 33 team's last two starts were at Phoenix and Homestead with Cale Gale (Jones' K&N Pro Series crew chief), who would finish sixth and tenth respectively. The team planned to attempt seven races with Jones in 2014 with Shane Huffman as crew chief, in addition to Jones' full-time K&N Pro Series East schedule. Jones made three starts, with a best finish of fourth at Dover. However, in August, Jones confirmed that he and TSM had parted ways. Jones drove in the final two races in K&N Pro Series East driving for Richard Childress Racing, and ran two more Truck Series races in the 33 with GMS Racing.

=== Truck No. 34 History ===
On August 15, 2011, it was announced that Turner Scott Motorsports would be fielding a fourth truck for NASCAR Sprint Cup Series driver Ryan Newman in early September at Atlanta Motor Speedway. The truck was sponsored by Brandt and Realtree and honored the life of Beau Slocumb, an ARCA racer who was a close friend to Ryan Newman, as well as a friend and employee of Turner Scott Motorsports. The truck was No. 08, as this was the number that Slocumb raced throughout his career. Newman finished fifth at Atlanta and donated the race winnings to Slocumb's widow to pay for their medical expenses.

In 2013, the truck was renumbered No. 34, and Ryan Newman drove the truck at Eldora Speedway in the Mudsummer Classic. Newman would finish third. The team returned at Homestead with Ron Hornaday Jr., who just recently parted ways with NTS Motorsports. Hornaday would finish fifth.

=== Truck No. 42 History ===
In the 2014 season finale at Homestead–Miami Speedway, Kyle Larson drove the No. 42 Silverado sponsored by Parker Hannifin, one of Larson's first sponsors during his midget car racing career. Mike Hillman Jr. would move over from the 32 truck to head the effort as crew chief. Larson qualified the truck on the pole, and dominated the race by leading 96 of the 134 laps, but ultimately finished second to Bubba Wallace in similar fashion to the Eldora race earlier that year.

== K&N Pro Series and ARCA Racing Series ==
In addition to its national series teams, Turner Scott Motorsports fielded teams full-time in the K&N Pro Series East in 2013 and 2014, with occasionally entries in the K&N Pro Series West and ARCA Racing Series.

=== 2012 ===
In 2012, Brandon McReynolds, son of crew chief and analyst Larry McReynolds, ran both restrictor plate ARCA races, finishing 11th in the 4 car at Daytona, and taking the win at Talladega Superspeedway in the 32 Turner/Win-Tron Racing car.

=== 2013 ===
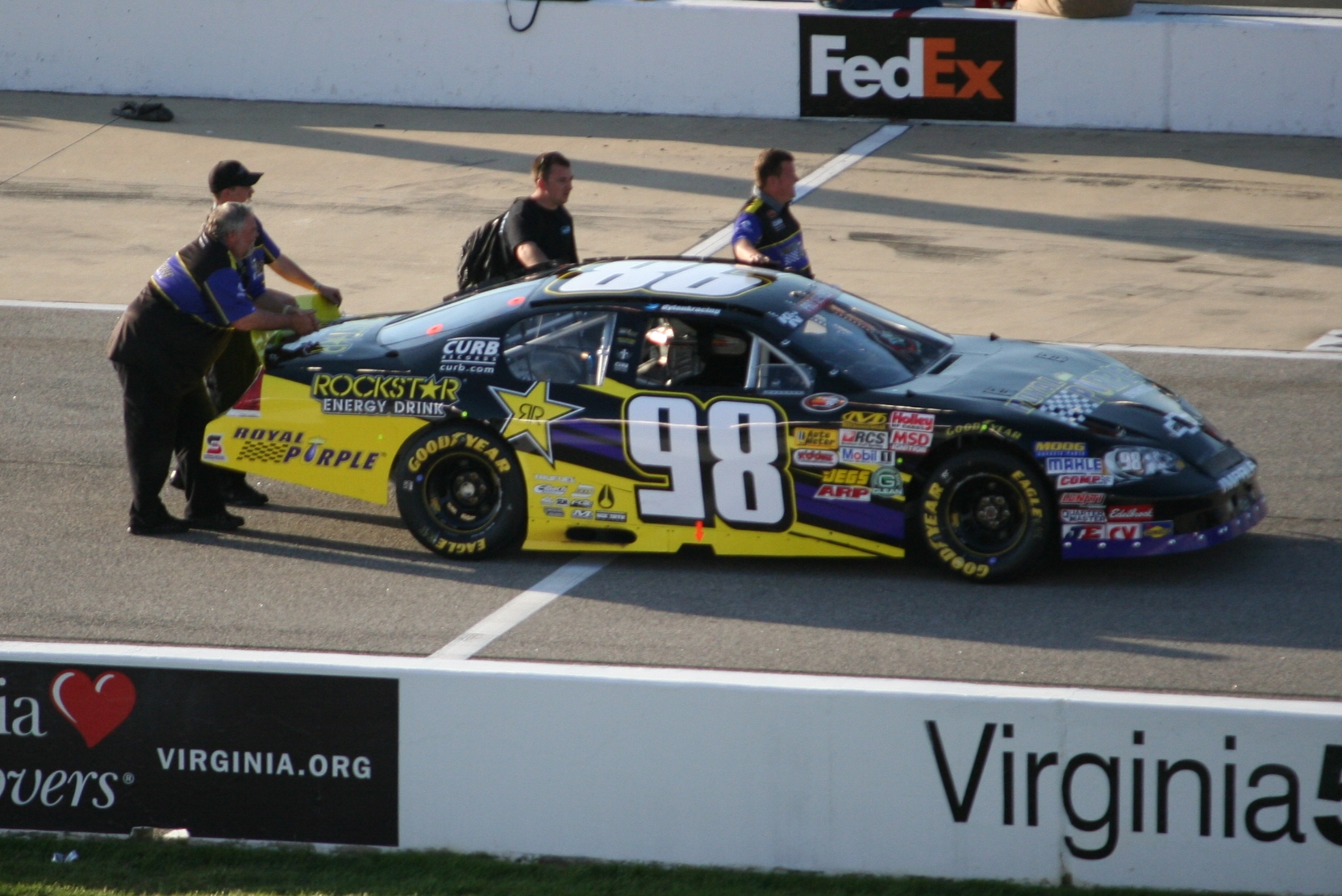
Dylan Kwasniewski won the 2013 K&N Pro Series East Championship.

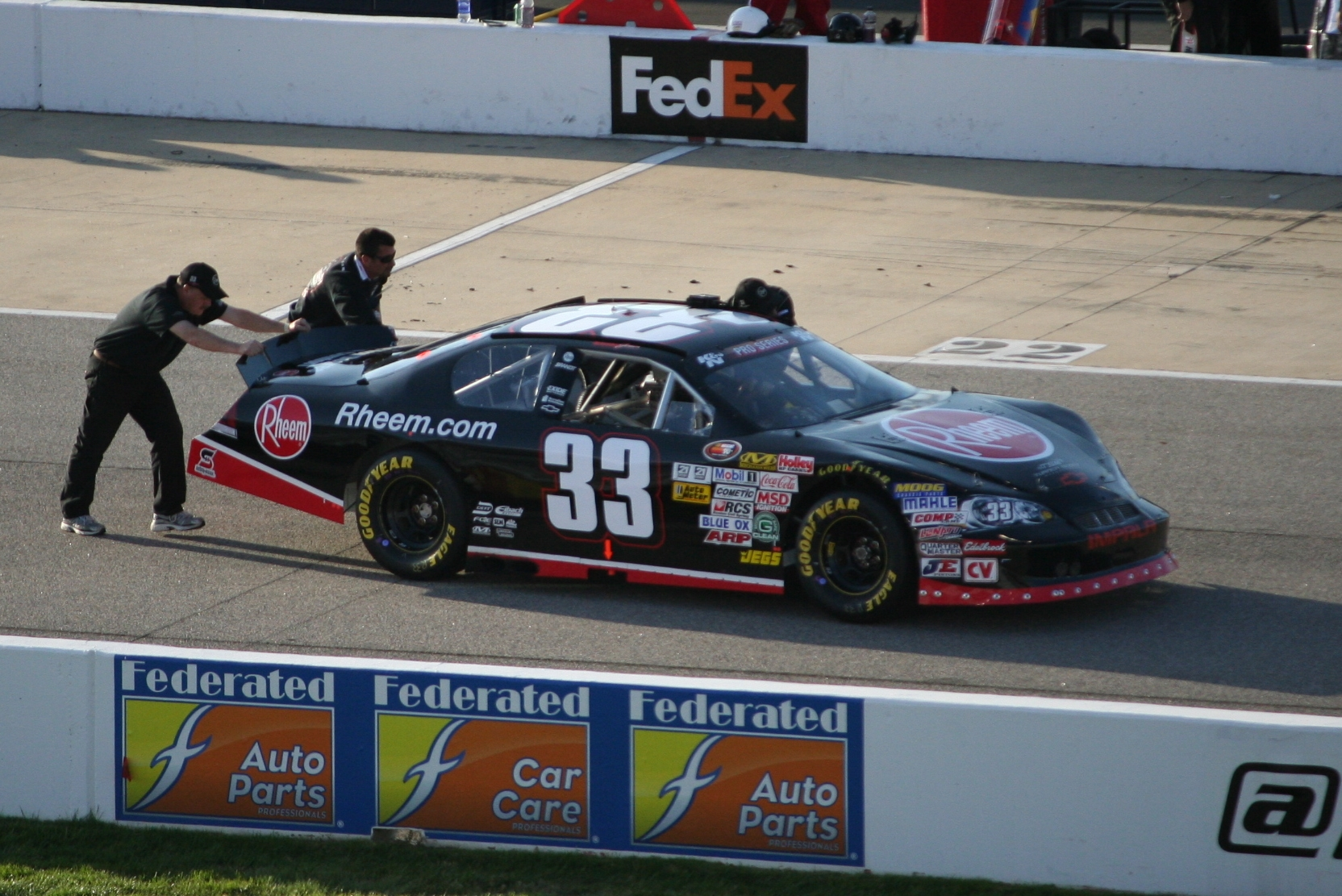
Brandon Jones in 2013.

In the ARCA Racing Series Daytona opener, Turner Scott fielded the 4 car for Kyle Larson in preparation for his full-time Nationwide Series schedule, with sponsorship from Chip Ganassi Racing partner Cessna. The team also fielded a number 62 car for Mark Thompson, and the cars finished second and eighth respectively.

For 2013, Turner Scott fielded three full-time teams in the K&N Pros Series East. 2012 K&N Pro Series West Champion Dylan Kwasniewski moved to TSM's 98 Impala, bringing sponsors Rockstar Energy and Royal Purple Motor Oil and joined by Curb Records (Mike Curb was listed as owner). Austin Dyne also moved over from the West Series to drive the 99 KMC Wheels Impala, while Kenzie Ruston Hemric drove the 34 AccuDoc Solutions Impala. Kwasniewski became the first driver to win both the West and East Series titles, and tied the series record with six victories including the season finale at the Road Atlanta road course. Ben Rhodes ran a seven race schedule, scoring five top-fives in the 41 Alpha Energy Impala. Brandon Jones ran six East races with crew chief Cale Gale, and one West race, scoring two top tens in the Rheem Impala.

=== 2014 ===
Dylan Kwasniewski drove the 4 AccuDoc Solutions car in the ARCA Daytona opener, winning the pole and finished 14th. Mark Thompson ran the car at Talladega to a 15th-place finish. Kyle Larson ran the car with Target at Pocono, dominating the race from the pole and scoring the win. Brandon Jones ran the car in three races, scoring wins at Winchester and Indianapolis Raceway Park, and finishing third at Madison. Ben Rhodes made his ARCA debut in a 41 car at his native Kentucky Speedway, starting 5th but finishing 27th after a crash. Larson also ran the K&N Pro Series West race at Sonoma Raceway, starting and finishing first in the Target/Clorox No. 42.

TSM moved Brandon Jones (No. 33) and Ben Rhodes (No. 41) to full-time K&N East schedules, in addition to part-time schedules in the Camping World Truck Series. The two were joined by Cameron Hayley (No. 98), Kaz Grala (No. 31), and Scott Heckert (No. 34). After 14 races and a win at the second Iowa race, Jones and crew chief Shane Huffman left TSM to run the 33 for Richard Childress Racing. Rhodes, meanwhile, would claim TSM's second consecutive K&N Pro Series East Championship through five wins, 11 top-five finishes, and six poles. Rhodes would also tie a series record set by Ricky Craven in 1991 by winning four consecutive races (Iowa, Bowman Gray, Five Flags, Langley Speedway) between May and June.

== Affiliations ==
=== HScott Motorsports ===
Harry Scott also owned a separate Sprint Cup Series team, HScott Motorsports. They last fielded the No. 15 5-hour Energy/Peak Antifreeze Chevrolet for Clint Bowyer and the No. 46 Pilot Flying J Chevrolet for Michael Annett.

=== Chip Ganassi Racing ===
On many occasions, TSM has run drivers in the Nationwide Series and Camping World Truck Series for developmental reasons. These cases included drivers Kyle Larson and Dylan Kwasniewski; the latter of the two drove for TSM in the K&N Pro Series East before signing with Ganassi as a development driver.
