= Charles Strasburger =

American basketball coach

Coaching career (HC unless noted)

Basketball
- 1973–1975: Lipscomb

Head coaching record
- Overall: 26–34

Charles Strasburger is an American former college men's basketball head coach. He coached Lipscomb University for the 1973–74 and 1974–75 seasons, compiling an overall record of 26 wins and 34 losses. In neither season did the Bisons make an NAIA Tournament appearance. Strasburger also later coached high school basketball.

== Head coaching record ==
Record table
Season	Team	Overall	Conference	Standing	Postseason
Lipscomb Bisons (NAIA) (1973–1975)
1973–74	Lipscomb	15–15			
1974–75	Lipscomb	11–19			
Total:		26–34 (.433)			
