= Larry Hollingsworth Strasburger =

American psychiatrist

Larry H. Strasburger was an American psychiatrist. He served at the Bridgewater State Hospital and had a contract with McLean Hospital. He also was a vice president of the American Academy of Psychiatry and the Law and later became its president.
