= Brandt (company) =

Food company in Germany

Brandt Zwieback-Schokoladen GmbH + Co. KG
- Industry: Biscuit
- Founded: Hagen, Germany (October 12, 1912; 113 years ago)
- Founder: Carl Brandt
- Key people: Peter Scharf
- Products: Zwieback
- Website: www.brandt-zwieback.de

Brandt Zwieback-Schokoladen GmbH + Co. KG is a zwieback and chocolate producer in Germany. The company was established on 12 October 1912 in Hagen by Carl Brandt. In 2007, director Peter Scharf made a documentary on the company's history for WDR.
