= Eduard Strasburger =

Polish-German botanist (1844–1912)

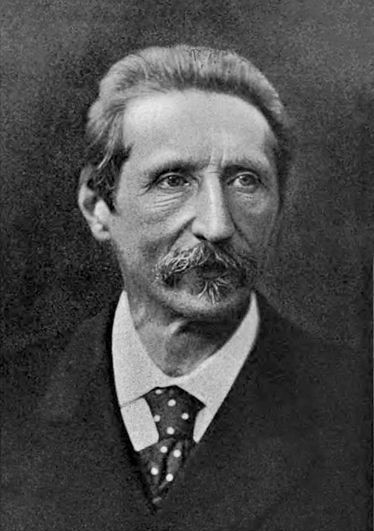
- Born: 1 February 1844; Warsaw, Congress Poland
- Died: 18 May 1912 (aged 68); Bonn, Germany
- Citizenship: Poland; Germany
- Education: University of Warsaw; University of Jena; University of Bonn
- Known for: Discovery of mitosis
- Spouse: Alexandra Julie
- Children: 3 (including Julius Strasburger)
- Awards: Linnean Medal; Darwin-Wallace Medal
- Scientific career
- Fields: Botany
- Author abbrev. (botany): Strasb

Eduard Adolf Strasburger (1 February 1844 – 18 May 1912) was a Polish-German professor and one of the most famous botanists of the 19th century. He discovered mitosis in plants.

== Life ==
Eduard Strasburger was born in Warsaw, Congress Poland, the son of Anna Karoline (von Schütz) and Eduard Gottlieb Strasburger (1803–1874). In 1870, he married Alexandra Julia ("Alexandrine") Wertheim (1847–1902), they had two children: Anna (1870–1942) and Julius (1871–1934).

Strasburger studied biological sciences in Paris, Bonn and Jena, receiving a PhD in 1866 after working with Nathanael Pringsheim. In 1868 he taught at the University of Warsaw. In 1869 he was appointed professor of botany at the University of Jena. From 1881 he was head of the Botanisches Institut at the University of Bonn.

Strasburger died in Bonn, Germany.

== Achievements ==
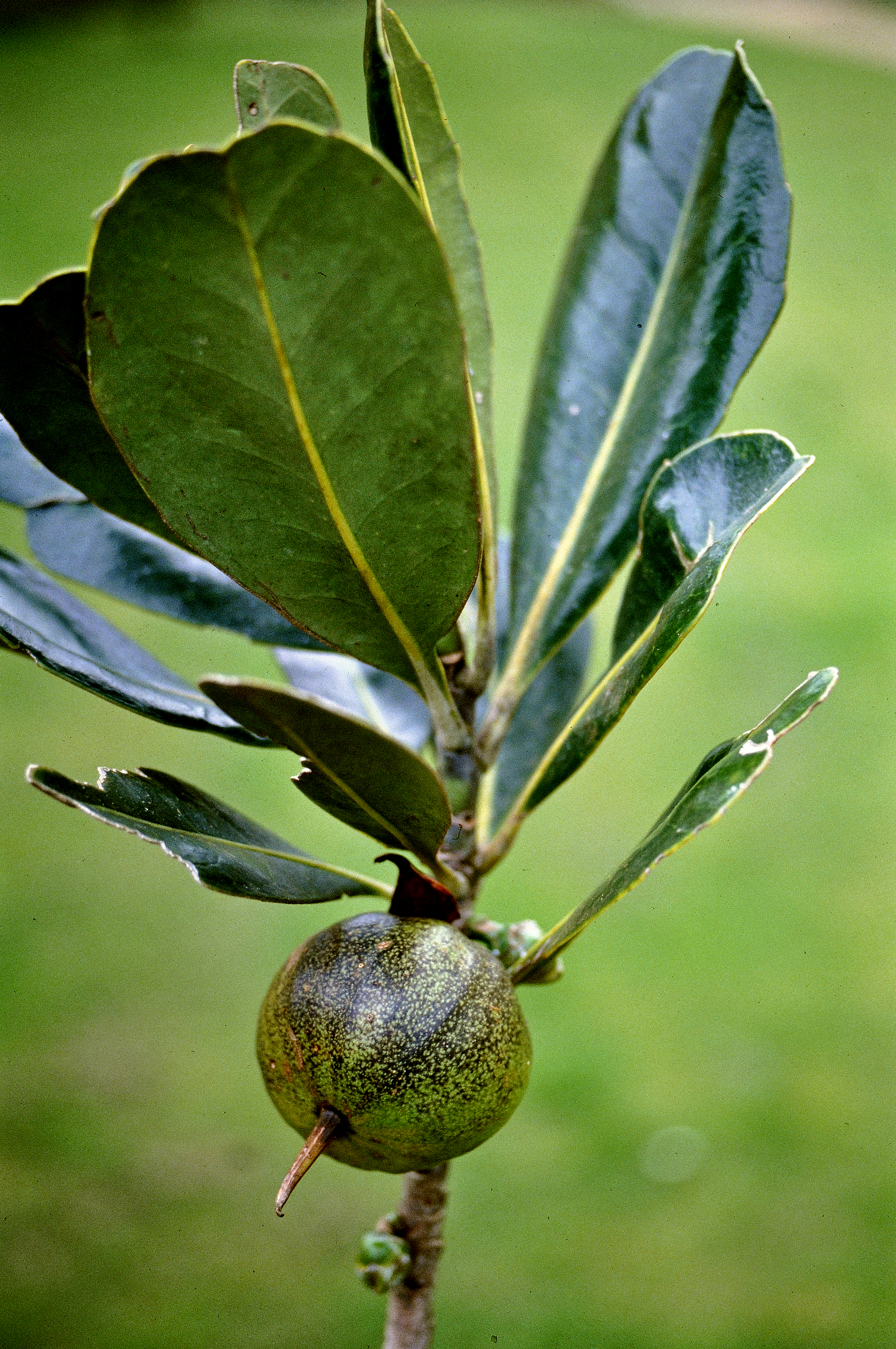
Strasburgeria robusta forms the own plant family Strasburgeriaceae in New Caledonia. Photo taken in his old Botanical Institute and Botanical Garden University of Bonn in 1992

Strasburger was a founder of the famous Lehrbuch der Botanik für Hochschulen (Textbook of Botany), which first appeared in 1894. He was the first to provide an accurate description of the embryonic sac in gymnosperms (such as conifers) and angiosperms (flowering plants), along with demonstrating double-fertilization in angiosperms. He came up with one of the modern laws of plant cytology: "New cell nuclei can only arise from the division of other nuclei." and originated the terms cytoplasm and nucleoplasm.

Together with Walther Flemming and Edouard van Beneden, he elucidated chromosome distribution during cell division. His work on the upward movement of tree sap proved that the process was physical and not physiological.

== Awards ==
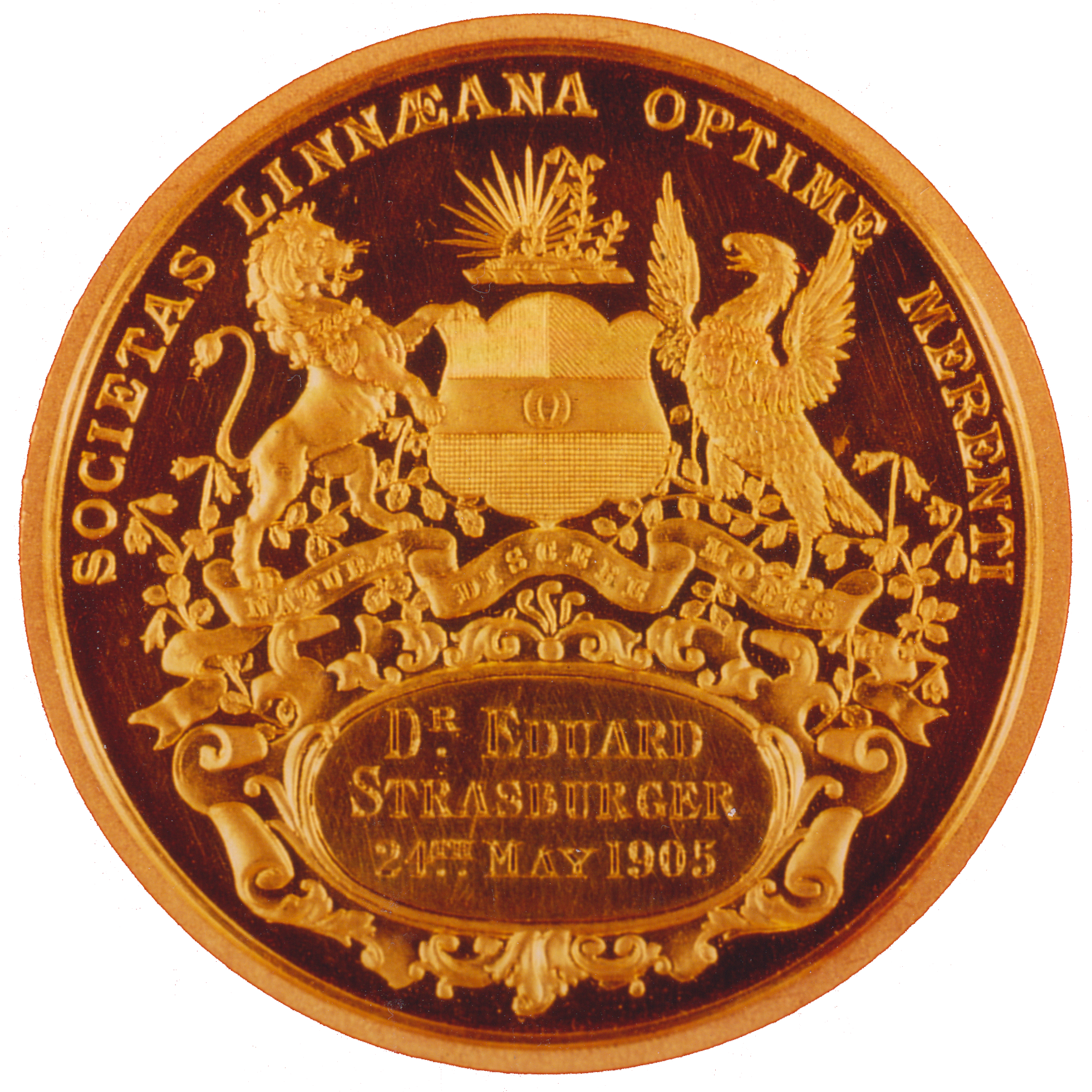
Linné Medaille an Eduard Strasburger, 1905

In 1886 Strasburger was elected an honorary member of the Manchester Literary and Philosophical Society. He was awarded the Linnean Medal in 1905, as well as the Linnean Society of London's even more prestigious Darwin-Wallace Medal in 1908, awarded only once every 50 years.

== Family ==
Strasburger was married to the pianist Alexandra Julie ("Alexandrine") Wertheim (1847–1902, daughter of the banker and councillor Julius Wertheim 1817–1901 from Warsaw, half sister of Carl Tausig) and aunt of the pianist Juliusz Wertheim (1880−1928); they had three children (the third died early). His son was the internist Julius Strasburger, a grandson was the ancient historian Hermann Strasburger.

== Works ==
- On Cell Formation and Cell Division, 1876 – a book in which he set forth the basic principles of mitosis.
- Ueber das Verhalten des Pollens und die Befruchtungsvorgänge bei den Gymnospermen: Schwärmsporen, Gameten, pflanzliche Spermatozoiden und das Wesen der Befruchtung. Gustav Fischer Verlag, Jena, 1892.
- Lehrbuch der Botanik für Hochschulen, 1st ed., 1894; 4th ed., 1900, digital edition by ULB Düsseldorf; 5th ed., 1902, by ULB Düsseldorf; 8th ed., 1906, by ULB Düsseldorf; 16th ed., 1923, available at BHL; 33rd ed., 1991; 36th ed. 2008. Translated to English, Estonian, Italian, Japanese, Polish, Russian, Serbo-Croatian, and Spanish. A complete list of editions and translations up to 1994 is given in Finke et al. (1994)
- A Textbook of botany, 1st ed., 1898, English translation of the 2nd German ed. (1895), available at BHL. Macmillan, London.
- Das kleine botanische Practicum für Anfänger : Anleitung zum Selbststudium der mikroskopischen Botanik und Einführung in die mikroskopische Technik, 4th ed., 1902, digital edition by ULB Düsseldorf.

== See also ==
- List of Poles
