= Zwieback =

Central European toast

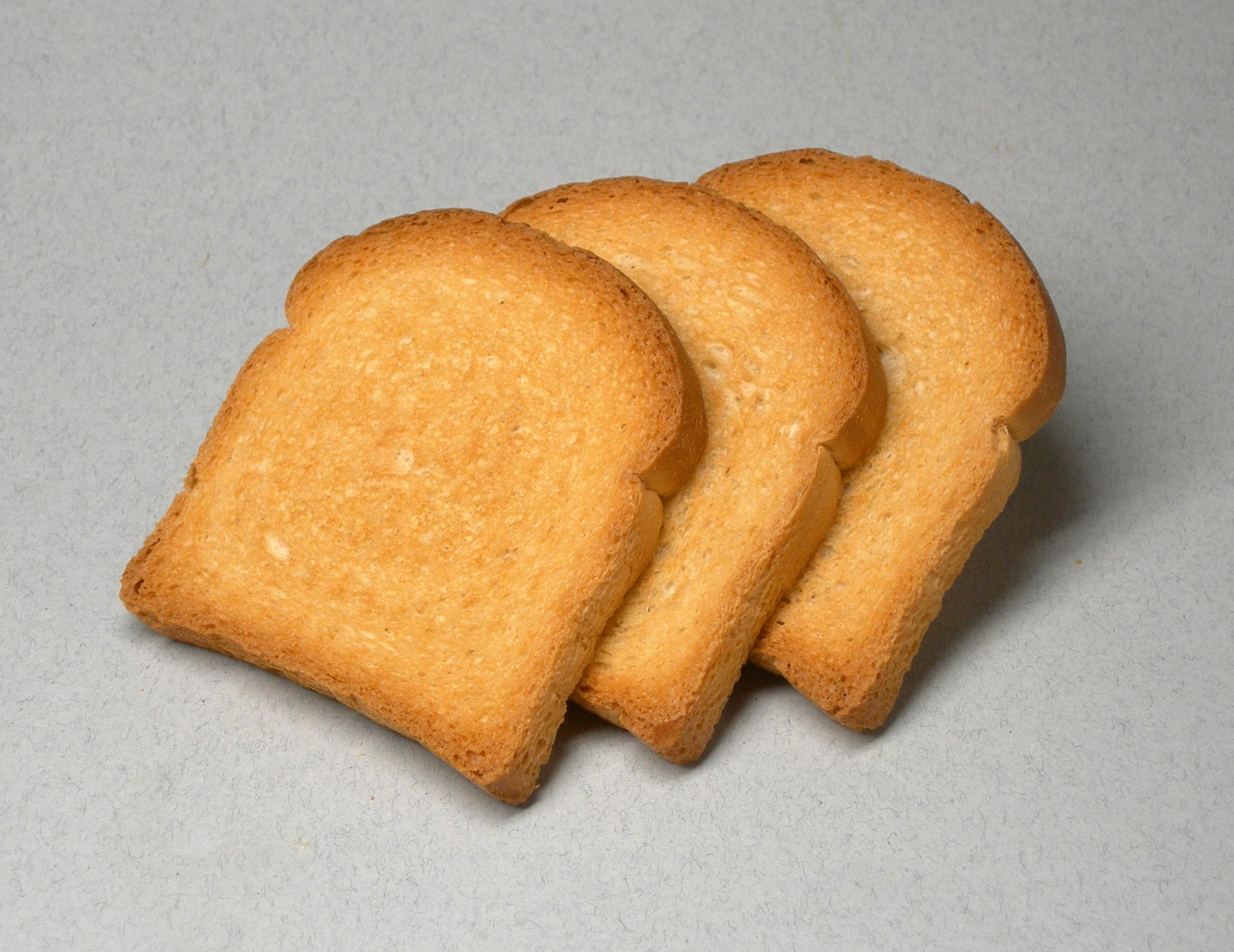
- Type: Bread
- Place of origin: Germany
- Region or state: East Prussia
- Main ingredients: Flour, eggs, sugar

Zwieback (German: [ˈt͡sviːbak]) is a form of rusk from German cuisine eaten throughout Europe. It is a type of crisp, sweetened bread, made with eggs and baked twice. It originated in East Prussia. According to Fabian Scheidler, Albrecht von Wallenstein invented Zwieback to feed his mercenary army during the Thirty Years' War. Zwieback is commonly used to feed teething babies and as the first solid food for patients with an upset stomach.

The name comes from German zwei ('two') or zwie ('twi-', 'two-'), and backen, meaning 'to bake'. Zwieback hence literally translates to 'twice-baked'. Names for similar types of rusk in other cultures have parallel derivations, including French biscotte and Italian fette biscottate (from Latin bis- 'twice' and coctus 'baked'), the Slovene prepečenec ('baked over ordinary' or 'overbaked') and the Serbo-Croatian dvopek (dvo- 'twice', pek 'baked').

== See also ==
- Biscotti
- Brandt (company)
- Melba toast
