= Strasberg =

Strasberg is a surname. Notable people with the surname include:

- John Strasberg (born 1941), American actor, director, teacher and writer, son of Lee and Paula, brother of Susan
- Lee Strasberg (1901–1982), Polish-born American actor, director, and theatre practitioner
- Paula Strasberg (1909–1966), American stage actress, Lee Strasberg's second wife
- Susan Strasberg (1938–1999), American stage, film, and television actress, daughter of Lee and Paula
