= 2013 Ford EcoBoost 300 =

33rd race of the 2013 NASCAR Nationwide Series

Race details
- Race 33 of 33 of the 2013 NASCAR Nationwide Series
- Date: November 16, 2013
- Official name: 19th Annual Ford EcoBoost 300
- Location: Homestead, Florida, Homestead–Miami Speedway
- Course: Permanent racing facility
- Course length: 1.5 miles (2.41 km)
- Distance: 200 laps, 300 mi (482.803 km)
- Scheduled distance: 200 laps, 300 mi (482.803 km)
- Average speed: 109.025 miles per hour (175.459 km/h)

Pole position
Driver	Sam Hornish Jr.	Penske Racing
- Time: 32.561

Most laps led
Driver	Kyle Larson	Turner Scott Motorsports
- Laps: 54

Winner
No. 48	Brad Keselowski	Penske Racing

Television in the United States
- Network: ESPN
- Announcers: Allen Bestwick, Dale Jarrett, Andy Petree

Radio in the United States
- Radio: Motor Racing Network

The 2013 Ford EcoBoost 300 was the 33rd and final stock car race of the 2013 NASCAR Nationwide Series and the 19th iteration of the event. The race was held on Saturday, November 16, in Homestead, Florida at Homestead–Miami Speedway, a 1.5 miles (2.4 km) permanent oval-shaped racetrack. The race took the scheduled 200 laps to complete. At race's end, Brad Keselowski, driving for Penske Racing, would make a late-race charge on the restart with five to go to win his 27th career NASCAR Nationwide Series win and his seventh and final win of the season. To fill out the podium, Kyle Larson of Turner Scott Motorsports and Kyle Busch of Joe Gibbs Racing would finish second and third, respectively.

Meanwhile, Richard Childress Racing driver Austin Dillon would win the championship in a tight battle with Penske Racing driver Sam Hornish Jr., finishing within six spots of Hornish Jr., with Dillon finishing 12th and Hornish Jr. finishing eighth, securing Dillon's first championship by three points.

== Background ==
The layout of Homestead–Miami Speedway, the venue where the race was held.

Homestead-Miami Speedway is a motor racing track located in Homestead, Florida. The track, which has several configurations, has promoted several series of racing, including NASCAR, the Verizon IndyCar Series, the Grand-Am Rolex Sports Car Series and the Championship Cup Series.

From 2002 to 2019, Homestead–Miami Speedway hosted the final race of the season in all three of NASCAR's series: the Sprint Cup Series, Xfinity Series and Gander Outdoors Truck Series. Ford Motor Company sponsored all three of the season-ending races, under the names Ford EcoBoost 400, Ford EcoBoost 300 and Ford EcoBoost 200, respectively. The weekend was marketed as Ford Championship Weekend. The Xfinity Series (then known as the Busch Series) held its season-ending races at Homestead from 1995 until 2020, when it was moved to Phoenix Raceway, along with NASCAR's other two series.

=== Entry list ===
- (R) denotes rookie driver.
- (i) denotes driver who is ineligible for series driver points.

#	Driver	Team	Make	Sponsor
01	Mike Wallace	JD Motorsports	Chevrolet	Corporate Caterers
2	Brian Scott	Richard Childress Racing	Chevrolet	Shore Lodge
3	Austin Dillon	Richard Childress Racing	Chevrolet	AdvoCare
4	Landon Cassill	JD Motorsports	Chevrolet	Flex Seal
5	Brad Sweet	JR Motorsports	Chevrolet	Great Clips
6	Trevor Bayne	Roush Fenway Racing	Ford	World Financial Group, Cargill
7	Regan Smith	JR Motorsports	Chevrolet	TaxSlayer
9	Corey LaJoie	Richard Petty Motorsports	Ford	Victory Junction
10	Mike Bliss	TriStar Motorsports	Toyota	TriStar Motorsports
11	Elliott Sadler	Joe Gibbs Racing	Toyota	OneMain Financial
12	Sam Hornish Jr.	Penske Racing	Ford	Alliance Truck Parts
14	Jeff Green	TriStar Motorsports	Toyota	Hefty Ultimate with Arm & Hammer
16	Ryan Reed	Roush Fenway Racing	Ford	Lilly Diabetes
18	Matt Kenseth (i)	Joe Gibbs Racing	Toyota	GameStop, Cabela's African Adventures
19	Dakoda Armstrong (i)	TriStar Motorsports	Toyota	WinField United
20	Drew Herring	Joe Gibbs Racing	Toyota	Dollar General
22	Joey Logano (i)	Penske Racing	Ford	Hertz
23	Timmy Hill (i)	Rick Ware Racing	Chevrolet	Pocket Finder
24	Ryan Ellis	SR² Motorsports	Toyota	Frontline Wraps
30	Nelson Piquet Jr. (R)	Turner Scott Motorsports	Chevrolet	Omnitracs
31	Justin Allgaier	Turner Scott Motorsports	Chevrolet	Brandt Professional Agriculture
32	Kyle Larson (R)	Turner Scott Motorsports	Chevrolet	Target
33	Ty Dillon (i)	Richard Childress Racing	Chevrolet	WESCO International
40	T. J. Bell	The Motorsports Group	Chevrolet	The Motorsports Group
42	Josh Wise	The Motorsports Group	Chevrolet	The Motorsports Group
43	Michael Annett	Richard Petty Motorsports	Ford	Fresh from Florida
44	Cole Whitt	TriStar Motorsports	Toyota	Takagi Tankless Water Heaters
48	Brad Keselowski (i)	Penske Racing	Ford	Discount Tire
51	Jeremy Clements	Jeremy Clements Racing	Chevrolet	All South Electric
54	Kyle Busch (i)	Joe Gibbs Racing	Toyota	Monster Energy
55	Jamie Dick	Viva Motorsports	Chevrolet	Viva Motorsports
60	Travis Pastrana	Roush Fenway Racing	Ford	Nitro Circus
70	Johanna Long	ML Motorsports	Chevrolet	Foretravel Motorcoach
74	Carl Long	Mike Harmon Racing	Dodge	Eneos
77	Parker Kligerman	Kyle Busch Motorsports	Toyota	Toyota
79	Bryan Silas (R) (i)	Go Green Racing	Ford	Tobacco Free Florida
87	Joe Nemechek	NEMCO Motorsports	Toyota	Wood Pellet Grills
91	Michael McDowell (i)	TriStar Motorsports	Toyota	TriStar Motorsports
92	Dexter Stacey (R)	KH Motorsports	Ford	Maddie's Place Rocks
98	Kevin Swindell (R)	Biagi-DenBeste Racing	Ford	Carroll Shelby Engine Co., DenBeste Heavy Equipment
99	Blake Koch	RAB Racing	Toyota	Compassion International
Official entry list

== Practice ==
=== First practice ===
The first practice session was held on Friday, November 16, at 10:00 AM EST, and would last for 50 minutes. Kyle Larson of Turner Scott Motorsports would set the fastest time in the session, with a lap of 31.970 and an average speed of 168.908 miles per hour (271.831 km/h).

Pos.	#	Driver	Team	Make	Time	Speed
1	32	Kyle Larson (R)	Turner Scott Motorsports	Chevrolet	31.970	168.908
2	18	Matt Kenseth (i)	Joe Gibbs Racing	Toyota	32.103	168.209
3	22	Joey Logano (i)	Penske Racing	Ford	32.153	167.947
Full first practice results

=== Second and final practice ===
The second and final practice session, sometimes referred to as Happy Hour, was held on Friday, November 16, at 3:10 PM EST, and would last for an hour and 10 minutes. Regan Smith of JR Motorsports would set the fastest time in the session, with a lap of 32.262 and an average speed of 167.380 miles per hour (269.372 km/h).

Pos.	#	Driver	Team	Make	Time	Speed
1	7	Regan Smith	JR Motorsports	Chevrolet	32.262	167.380
2	44	Cole Whitt	TriStar Motorsports	Toyota	32.313	167.115
3	31	Justin Allgaier	Turner Scott Motorsports	Chevrolet	32.324	167.059
Full Happy Hour practice results

== Qualifying ==
Qualifying was held on Saturday, November 16, at 1:05 PM EST. Each driver would have two laps to set a fastest time; the fastest of the two would count as their official qualifying lap.

Sam Hornish Jr. of Penske Racing would win the pole, setting a time of 32.561 and an average speed of 165.843 miles per hour (266.898 km/h).

Carl Long was the only driver to fail to qualify.

=== Full qualifying results ===
Pos.	#	Driver	Team	Make	Time	Speed
1	12	Sam Hornish Jr.	Penske Racing	Ford	32.561	165.843
2	99	Blake Koch	RAB Racing	Toyota	32.573	165.781
3	48	Brad Keselowski (i)	Penske Racing	Ford	32.578	165.756
4	22	Joey Logano (i)	Penske Racing	Ford	32.605	165.619
5	18	Matt Kenseth (i)	Joe Gibbs Racing	Toyota	32.727	165.001
6	54	Kyle Busch (i)	Joe Gibbs Racing	Toyota	32.742	164.926
7	5	Brad Sweet	JR Motorsports	Chevrolet	32.746	164.906
8	32	Kyle Larson (R)	Turner Scott Motorsports	Chevrolet	32.884	164.214
9	6	Trevor Bayne	Roush Fenway Racing	Ford	32.902	164.124
10	2	Brian Scott	Richard Childress Racing	Chevrolet	32.959	163.840
11	3	Austin Dillon	Richard Childress Racing	Chevrolet	32.962	163.825
12	20	Drew Herring	Joe Gibbs Racing	Toyota	33.036	163.458
13	44	Cole Whitt	TriStar Motorsports	Toyota	33.038	163.448
14	31	Justin Allgaier	Turner Scott Motorsports	Chevrolet	33.054	163.369
15	30	Nelson Piquet Jr. (R)	Turner Scott Motorsports	Chevrolet	33.165	162.822
16	77	Parker Kligerman	Kyle Busch Motorsports	Toyota	33.176	162.768
17	33	Ty Dillon (i)	Richard Childress Racing	Chevrolet	33.235	162.479
18	11	Elliott Sadler	Joe Gibbs Racing	Toyota	33.241	162.450
19	16	Ryan Reed	Roush Fenway Racing	Ford	33.248	162.416
20	9	Corey LaJoie	Richard Petty Motorsports	Ford	33.259	162.362
21	4	Landon Cassill	JD Motorsports	Chevrolet	33.284	162.240
22	60	Travis Pastrana	Roush Fenway Racing	Ford	33.370	161.822
23	43	Michael Annett	Richard Petty Motorsports	Ford	33.383	161.759
24	98	Kevin Swindell (R)	Biagi-DenBeste Racing	Ford	33.491	161.237
25	7	Regan Smith	JR Motorsports	Chevrolet	33.606	160.686
26	91	Michael McDowell (i)	TriStar Motorsports	Toyota	33.614	160.647
27	10	Mike Bliss	TriStar Motorsports	Toyota	33.615	160.643
28	01	Mike Wallace	JD Motorsports	Chevrolet	33.728	160.104
29	14	Jeff Green	TriStar Motorsports	Toyota	33.735	160.071
30	87	Joe Nemechek	NEMCO Motorsports	Toyota	33.846	159.546
31	70	Johanna Long	ML Motorsports	Chevrolet	33.867	159.447
32	51	Jeremy Clements	Jeremy Clements Racing	Chevrolet	33.894	159.320
33	92	Dexter Stacey (R)	KH Motorsports	Ford	33.909	159.250
34	19	Dakoda Armstrong (i)	TriStar Motorsports	Toyota	33.934	159.132
35	23	Timmy Hill (i)	Rick Ware Racing	Chevrolet	33.956	159.029
36	55	Jamie Dick	Viva Motorsports	Chevrolet	34.018	158.739
37	40	T. J. Bell	The Motorsports Group	Chevrolet	34.313	157.375
38	24	Ryan Ellis	SR² Motorsports	Toyota	34.329	157.301
Qualified by owner's points
39	79	Bryan Silas (R) (i)	Go Green Racing	Ford	35.424	152.439
Last car to qualify on time
40	42	Josh Wise	The Motorsports Group	Chevrolet	34.326	157.315
Failed to qualify
41	74	Carl Long	Mike Harmon Racing	Dodge	34.904	154.710
Official starting lineup

== Race results ==
Fin	St	#	Driver	Team	Make	Laps	Led	Status	Pts	Winnings
1	3	48	Brad Keselowski (i)	Penske Racing	Ford	200	25	running	0	$83,475
2	8	32	Kyle Larson (R)	Turner Scott Motorsports	Chevrolet	200	54	running	38	$77,675
3	6	54	Kyle Busch (i)	Joe Gibbs Racing	Toyota	200	29	running	0	$49,175
4	5	18	Matt Kenseth (i)	Joe Gibbs Racing	Toyota	200	9	running	0	$40,860
5	9	6	Trevor Bayne	Roush Fenway Racing	Ford	200	0	running	39	$40,380
6	4	22	Joey Logano (i)	Penske Racing	Ford	200	37	running	0	$26,580
7	16	77	Parker Kligerman	Kyle Busch Motorsports	Toyota	200	0	running	37	$28,980
8	1	12	Sam Hornish Jr.	Penske Racing	Ford	200	37	running	37	$32,555
9	13	44	Cole Whitt	TriStar Motorsports	Toyota	200	0	running	35	$26,930
10	15	30	Nelson Piquet Jr. (R)	Turner Scott Motorsports	Chevrolet	200	0	running	34	$27,080
11	2	99	Blake Koch	RAB Racing	Toyota	200	0	running	33	$25,880
12	11	3	Austin Dillon	Richard Childress Racing	Chevrolet	200	0	running	32	$24,330
13	19	16	Ryan Reed	Roush Fenway Racing	Ford	200	0	running	31	$23,930
14	17	33	Ty Dillon (i)	Richard Childress Racing	Chevrolet	200	9	running	0	$23,730
15	12	20	Drew Herring	Joe Gibbs Racing	Toyota	200	0	running	29	$24,220
16	18	11	Elliott Sadler	Joe Gibbs Racing	Toyota	200	0	running	28	$24,415
17	23	43	Michael Annett	Richard Petty Motorsports	Ford	200	0	running	27	$23,405
18	22	60	Travis Pastrana	Roush Fenway Racing	Ford	200	0	running	26	$23,590
19	14	31	Justin Allgaier	Turner Scott Motorsports	Chevrolet	200	0	running	25	$23,030
20	29	14	Jeff Green	TriStar Motorsports	Toyota	200	0	running	24	$23,595
21	31	70	Johanna Long	ML Motorsports	Chevrolet	200	0	running	23	$22,810
22	39	79	Bryan Silas (R) (i)	Go Green Racing	Ford	200	0	running	0	$22,700
23	35	23	Timmy Hill (i)	Rick Ware Racing	Chevrolet	200	0	running	0	$22,565
24	34	19	Dakoda Armstrong (i)	TriStar Motorsports	Toyota	200	0	running	0	$22,450
25	36	55	Jamie Dick	Viva Motorsports	Chevrolet	199	0	running	19	$16,790
26	30	87	Joe Nemechek	NEMCO Motorsports	Toyota	198	0	running	18	$22,185
27	33	92	Dexter Stacey (R)	KH Motorsports	Ford	194	0	running	17	$16,070
28	28	01	Mike Wallace	JD Motorsports	Chevrolet	184	0	crash	16	$21,955
29	25	7	Regan Smith	JR Motorsports	Chevrolet	183	0	crash	15	$21,850
30	32	51	Jeremy Clements	Jeremy Clements Racing	Chevrolet	183	0	crash	14	$22,040
31	7	5	Brad Sweet	JR Motorsports	Chevrolet	175	0	running	13	$21,930
32	10	2	Brian Scott	Richard Childress Racing	Chevrolet	173	0	running	12	$21,665
33	21	4	Landon Cassill	JD Motorsports	Chevrolet	163	0	running	11	$21,460
34	20	9	Corey LaJoie	Richard Petty Motorsports	Ford	148	0	running	10	$15,395
35	24	98	Kevin Swindell (R)	Biagi-DenBeste Racing	Ford	127	0	crash	9	$21,356
36	38	24	Ryan Ellis	SR² Motorsports	Toyota	102	0	vibration	8	$20,150
37	27	10	Mike Bliss	TriStar Motorsports	Toyota	49	0	electrical	7	$14,085
38	37	40	T. J. Bell	The Motorsports Group	Chevrolet	20	0	vibration	6	$19,994
39	40	42	Josh Wise	The Motorsports Group	Chevrolet	5	0	electrical	5	$13,735
40	26	91	Michael McDowell (i)	TriStar Motorsports	Toyota	5	0	overheating	0	$13,700
Failed to qualify
41		74	Carl Long	Mike Harmon Racing	Dodge					
Official race results

== Standings after the race ==
Drivers' Championship standings

Pos	Driver	Points
1	Austin Dillon	1,180
2	Sam Hornish Jr.	1,177 (-3)
3	Regan Smith	1,108 (-72)
4	Elliott Sadler	1,090 (–90)
5	Justin Allgaier	1,090 (–90)
6	Trevor Bayne	1,086 (–94)
7	Brian Scott	1,053 (–127)
8	Kyle Larson	1,001 (–179)
9	Parker Kligerman	993 (–187)
10	Brian Vickers	970 (–210)
Official driver's standings

- Note: Only the first 10 positions are included for the driver standings.

Previous race: 2013 ServiceMaster 200	NASCAR Nationwide Series; 2013 season	Next race: 2014 DRIVE4COPD 300
