= 2013 Subway Firecracker 250 =

16th race of the 2013 NASCAR Nationwide Series

Race details
- Race 16 of 33 of the 2013 NASCAR Nationwide Series
- Date: July 5, 2013
- Official name: 12th Annual Subway Firecracker 250
- Location: Daytona Beach, Florida, Daytona International Speedway
- Course: Permanent racing facility
- Course length: 2.5 miles (4.0 km)
- Distance: 101 laps, 252.5 mi (406.359 km)
- Scheduled distance: 100 laps, 250 mi (402.336 km)
- Average speed: 145.767 miles per hour (234.589 km/h)

Pole position
| Driver | Austin Dillon | Richard Childress Racing |
- Time: 50.298

Most laps led
| Driver | Sam Hornish Jr. | Penske Racing |
- Laps: 61

Winner
| No. 18 | Matt Kenseth | Joe Gibbs Racing |

Television in the United States
- Network: ESPN
- Announcers: Allen Bestwick, Dale Jarrett, Andy Petree

Radio in the United States
- Radio: Motor Racing Network

The 2013 Subway Firecracker 250 was the 16th stock car race of the 2013 NASCAR Nationwide Series and the 12th iteration of the event. The race was held on Friday, July 5, 2013, in Daytona Beach, Florida at Daytona International Speedway, a 2.5 miles (4.0 km) permanent triangular-shaped superspeedway. The race was extended from its scheduled 100 laps to 101 due to a green–white–checker finish. At race's end, Matt Kenseth, driving for Joe Gibbs Racing, would pull away on the final restart to win his 27th career NASCAR Nationwide Series win and his first of the season. To fill out the podium, James Buescher of Turner Scott Motorsports and Elliott Sadler of Joe Gibbs Racing would finish second and third, respectively.

== Background ==
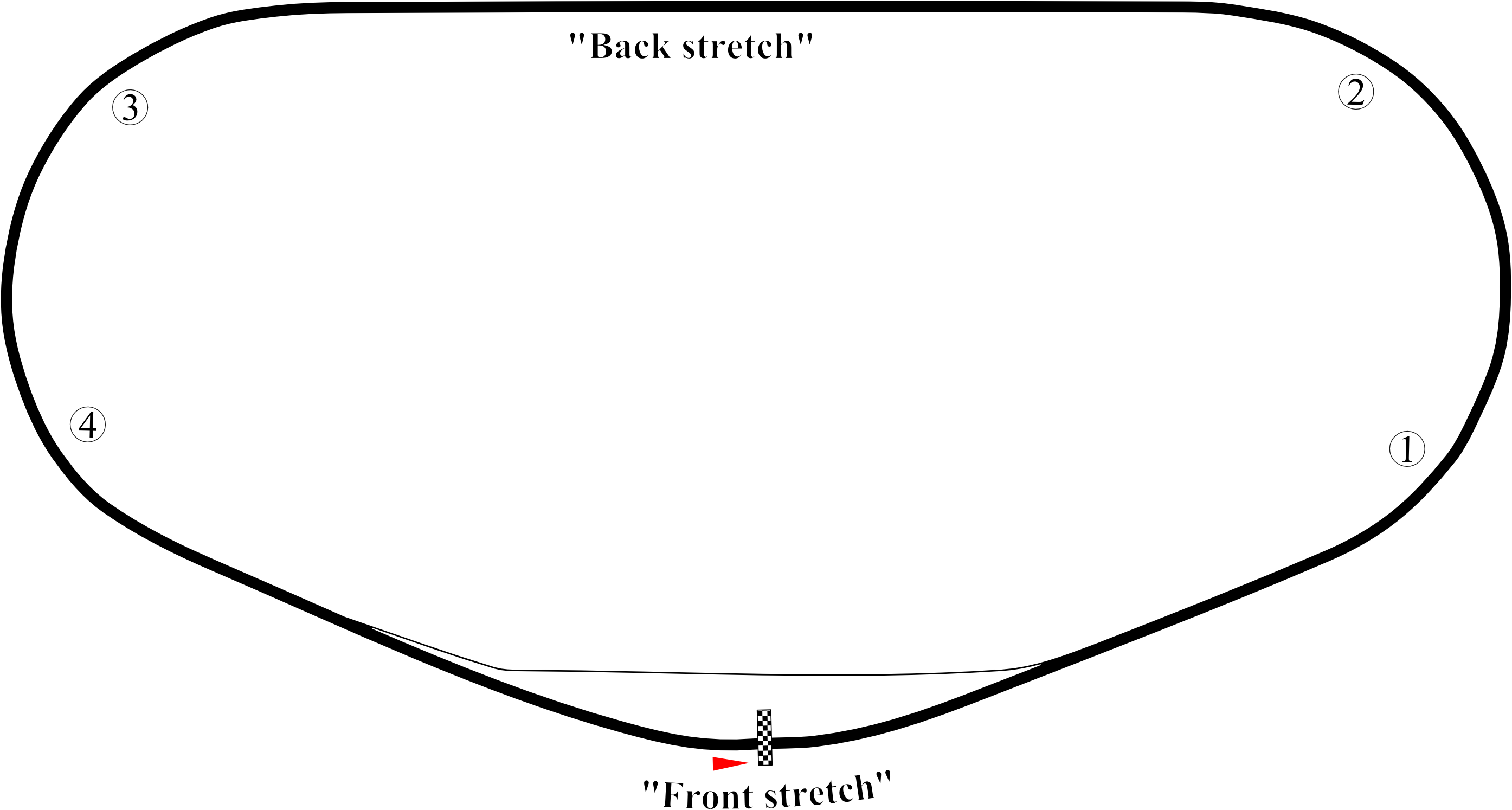
The layout of Daytona International Speedway, the venue where the race was held.

Daytona International Speedway is one of three superspeedways to hold NASCAR races, the other two being Indianapolis Motor Speedway and Talladega Superspeedway. The standard track at Daytona International Speedway is a four-turn superspeedway that is 2.5 miles (4.0 km) long. The track's turns are banked at 31 degrees, while the front stretch, the location of the finish line, is banked at 18 degrees.

=== Entry list ===
- (R) denotes rookie driver.
- (i) denotes driver who is ineligible for series driver points.

| # | Driver | Team | Make | Sponsor |
|---|---|---|---|---|
| 00 | Blake Koch | SR² Motorsports | Toyota | Compassion International |
| 1 | Kurt Busch (i) | Phoenix Racing | Chevrolet | City Chevrolet |
| 01 | Mike Wallace | JD Motorsports | Chevrolet | JD Motorsports |
| 2 | Brian Scott | Richard Childress Racing | Chevrolet | Rain-X |
| 3 | Austin Dillon | Richard Childress Racing | Chevrolet | AdvoCare Spark |
| 4 | Landon Cassill | JD Motorsports | Chevrolet | Flex Seal |
| 5 | Brad Sweet | JR Motorsports | Chevrolet | Great Clips |
| 6 | Trevor Bayne | Roush Fenway Racing | Ford | Winn-Dixie "The Beef People" |
| 7 | Regan Smith | JR Motorsports | Chevrolet | Winn-Dixie, Hellmann's Happy 100 Years |
| 10 | Jeff Green* | TriStar Motorsports | Toyota | TriStar Motorsports |
| 11 | Elliott Sadler | Joe Gibbs Racing | Toyota | Sport Clips Haircuts |
| 12 | Sam Hornish Jr. | Penske Racing | Ford | PPG Envirobase High Performance |
| 14 | Eric McClure | TriStar Motorsports | Toyota | Hefty, Reynolds Wrap |
| 18 | Matt Kenseth (i) | Joe Gibbs Racing | Toyota | GameStop, Playpad Pro |
| 19 | Mike Bliss | TriStar Motorsports | Toyota | Tweaker Energy Shot |
| 20 | Brian Vickers | Joe Gibbs Racing | Toyota | Dollar General |
| 22 | Joey Logano (i) | Penske Racing | Ford | Discount Tire |
| 23 | Robert Richardson Jr. | R3 Motorsports | Chevrolet | North Texas Pipe |
| 24 | Jason White | SR² Motorsports | Toyota | JW Demolition |
| 30 | Nelson Piquet Jr. (R) | Turner Scott Motorsports | Chevrolet | Worx Yard Tools |
| 31 | Justin Allgaier | Turner Scott Motorsports | Chevrolet | Brandt Professional Agriculture, TradeMark Nitrogen |
| 32 | Kyle Larson (R) | Turner Scott Motorsports | Chevrolet | Clorox |
| 33 | Ty Dillon (i) | Richard Childress Racing | Chevrolet | Hunt Brothers Pizza |
| 34 | James Buescher (i) | Turner Scott Motorsports | Chevrolet | Florida Lottery "Just Imagine" |
| 40 | Reed Sorenson | The Motorsports Group | Chevrolet | Swisher E-Cigarette |
| 42 | Josh Wise* | The Motorsports Group | Chevrolet | The Motorsports Group |
| 43 | Michael Annett | Richard Petty Motorsports | Ford | Pilot Flying J |
| 44 | Cole Whitt | TriStar Motorsports | Toyota | Gold Bond |
| 51 | Jeremy Clements | Jeremy Clements Racing | Chevrolet | All South Electric, Lighting Value |
| 52 | Joey Gase | Jimmy Means Racing | Toyota | TransLife Donation Services, Donate Life Florida |
| 54 | Kyle Busch (i) | Joe Gibbs Racing | Toyota | Monster Energy |
| 55 | Jamie Dick | Viva Motorsports | Chevrolet | Viva Motorsports |
| 60 | Travis Pastrana | Roush Fenway Racing | Ford | Roush Fenway Racing Patriotic |
| 70 | Tony Raines** | ML Motorsports | Toyota | ML Motorsports |
| 74 | Mike Harmon | Mike Harmon Racing | Dodge | Paxco Quality Race Car Refinishing |
| 77 | Parker Kligerman | Kyle Busch Motorsports | Toyota | Bandit Chippers Patriotic |
| 79 | Jeffrey Earnhardt (R) | Go Green Racing | Ford | Tobacco Free Florida |
| 85 | Bobby Gerhart | Bobby Gerhart Racing | Chevrolet | Lucas Oil |
| 87 | Joe Nemechek | NEMCO Motorsports | Toyota | AM/FM Energy Wood & Pellet Stoves |
| 89 | Morgan Shepherd | Shepherd Racing Ventures | Dodge | Racing with Jesus |
| 92 | Dexter Stacey (R) | KH Motorsports | Ford | Maddie's Place Rocks |
| 98 | Kevin Swindell (R) | Biagi-DenBeste Racing | Ford | Curb Records, LeAnn Rimes "Spitfire" |
| 99 | Alex Bowman (R) | RAB Racing | Toyota | ToyotaCare |
Official entry list

== Practice ==
=== First practice ===
The first practice session was held on Thursday, July 4, at 2:30 p.m. EST, and would last for one hour and 20 minutes. Brad Sweet of JR Motorsports would set the fastest time in the session, with a lap of 31.259 and an average speed of 172.750 miles per hour (278.014 km/h).

| Pos. | # | Driver | Team | Make | Time | Speed |
|---|---|---|---|---|---|---|
| 1 | 5 | Brad Sweet | JR Motorsports | Chevrolet | 46.688 | 192.769 |
| 2 | 7 | Regan Smith | JR Motorsports | Chevrolet | 46.689 | 192.765 |
| 3 | 77 | Parker Kligerman | Kyle Busch Motorsports | Toyota | 47.117 | 191.014 |
Full first practice results

=== Second and final practice ===
The second and final practice session, sometimes referred to as Happy Hour, was held on Thursday, July 4, at 5:30 p.m. EST, and would last for 55 minutes. Parker Kligerman of Kyle Busch Motorsports would set the fastest time in the session, with a lap of 48.913 and an average speed of 184.000 miles per hour (296.119 km/h).

| Pos. | # | Driver | Team | Make | Time | Speed |
|---|---|---|---|---|---|---|
| 1 | 77 | Parker Kligerman | Kyle Busch Motorsports | Toyota | 48.913 | 184.000 |
| 2 | 87 | Joe Nemechek | NEMCO Motorsports | Toyota | 48.914 | 183.996 |
| 3 | 23 | Robert Richardson Jr. | R3 Motorsports | Chevrolet | 50.349 | 178.752 |
Full Happy Hour practice results

== Qualifying ==
Qualifying was held on Friday, July 5, at 2:05 p.m. EST. Each driver would have two laps to set a fastest time; the fastest of the two would count as their official qualifying lap.

Austin Dillon of Richard Childress Racing would win the pole, setting a time of 50.298 and an average speed of 178.934 miles per hour (287.966 km/h).

Blake Koch was the only driver to fail to qualify.

=== Full qualifying results ===
| Pos. | # | Driver | Team | Make | Time | Speed |
|---|---|---|---|---|---|---|
| 1 | 3 | Austin Dillon | Richard Childress Racing | Chevrolet | 50.298 | 178.934 |
| 2 | 60 | Travis Pastrana | Roush Fenway Racing | Ford | 50.435 | 178.448 |
| 3 | 33 | Ty Dillon (i) | Richard Childress Racing | Chevrolet | 50.442 | 178.423 |
| 4 | 2 | Brian Scott | Richard Childress Racing | Chevrolet | 50.463 | 178.348 |
| 5 | 12 | Sam Hornish Jr. | Penske Racing | Ford | 50.468 | 178.331 |
| 6 | 31 | Justin Allgaier | Turner Scott Motorsports | Chevrolet | 50.499 | 178.221 |
| 7 | 1 | Kurt Busch (i) | Phoenix Racing | Chevrolet | 50.513 | 178.172 |
| 8 | 6 | Trevor Bayne | Roush Fenway Racing | Ford | 50.520 | 178.147 |
| 9 | 11 | Elliott Sadler | Joe Gibbs Racing | Toyota | 50.522 | 178.140 |
| 10 | 5 | Brad Sweet | JR Motorsports | Chevrolet | 50.546 | 178.056 |
| 11 | 7 | Regan Smith | JR Motorsports | Chevrolet | 50.558 | 178.013 |
| 12 | 99 | Alex Bowman (R) | RAB Racing | Toyota | 50.596 | 177.880 |
| 13 | 32 | Kyle Larson (R) | Turner Scott Motorsports | Chevrolet | 50.605 | 177.848 |
| 14 | 22 | Joey Logano (i) | Penske Racing | Ford | 50.626 | 177.774 |
| 15 | 54 | Kyle Busch (i) | Joe Gibbs Racing | Toyota | 50.671 | 177.616 |
| 16 | 43 | Michael Annett | Richard Petty Motorsports | Ford | 50.697 | 177.525 |
| 17 | 34 | James Buescher (i) | Turner Scott Motorsports | Chevrolet | 50.747 | 177.350 |
| 18 | 20 | Brian Vickers | Joe Gibbs Racing | Toyota | 50.766 | 177.284 |
| 19 | 18 | Matt Kenseth (i) | Joe Gibbs Racing | Toyota | 50.796 | 177.179 |
| 20 | 30 | Nelson Piquet Jr. (R) | Turner Scott Motorsports | Chevrolet | 50.857 | 176.967 |
| 21 | 19 | Mike Bliss | TriStar Motorsports | Toyota | 50.857 | 176.967 |
| 22 | 85 | Bobby Gerhart | Bobby Gerhart Racing | Chevrolet | 50.869 | 176.925 |
| 23 | 44 | Cole Whitt | TriStar Motorsports | Toyota | 50.873 | 176.911 |
| 24 | 14 | Eric McClure | TriStar Motorsports | Toyota | 50.903 | 176.807 |
| 25 | 55 | Jamie Dick | Viva Motorsports | Chevrolet | 50.950 | 176.644 |
| 26 | 98 | Kevin Swindell (R) | Biagi-DenBeste Racing | Ford | 51.086 | 176.174 |
| 27 | 77 | Parker Kligerman | Kyle Busch Motorsports | Toyota | 51.196 | 175.795 |
| 28 | 23 | Robert Richardson Jr. | R3 Motorsports | Chevrolet | 51.202 | 175.774 |
| 29 | 74 | Mike Harmon | Mike Harmon Racing | Dodge | 51.230 | 175.678 |
| 30 | 87 | Joe Nemechek | NEMCO Motorsports | Toyota | 51.231 | 175.675 |
| 31 | 89 | Morgan Shepherd | Shepherd Racing Ventures | Dodge | 51.378 | 175.172 |
| 32 | 24 | Jason White | SR² Motorsports | Toyota | 51.382 | 175.159 |
| 33 | 52 | Joey Gase | Jimmy Means Racing | Chevrolet | 51.433 | 174.985 |
| 34 | 79 | Jeffrey Earnhardt (R) | Go Green Racing | Ford | 51.501 | 174.754 |
| 35 | 01 | Mike Wallace | JD Motorsports | Chevrolet | 51.665 | 174.199 |
| 36 | 51 | Jeremy Clements | Jeremy Clements Racing | Chevrolet | 51.862 | 173.537 |
Qualified by owner's points
| 37 | 40 | Reed Sorenson | The Motorsports Group | Chevrolet | 51.960 | 173.210 |
| 38 | 70 | Jeff Green | ML Motorsports | Toyota | 51.999 | 173.080 |
| 39 | 4 | Landon Cassill | JD Motorsports | Chevrolet | 52.071 | 172.841 |
Last car to qualify on time
| 40 | 92 | Dexter Stacey (R) | KH Motorsports | Ford | 51.757 | 173.890 |
Failed to qualify or withdrew
| 41 | 00 | Blake Koch | SR² Motorsports | Toyota | 51.804 | 173.732 |
| WD | 10 | Jeff Green | TriStar Motorsports | Toyota | — | — |
| WD | 42 | Josh Wise | The Motorsports Group | Chevrolet | — | — |
Official starting lineup

== Race results ==
| Fin. | St | # | Driver | Team | Make | Laps | Led | Status | Pts | Winnings |
|---|---|---|---|---|---|---|---|---|---|---|
| 1 | 19 | 18 | Matt Kenseth (i) | Joe Gibbs Racing | Toyota | 101 | 16 | running | 0 | $83,290 |
| 2 | 17 | 34 | James Buescher (i) | Turner Scott Motorsports | Chevrolet | 101 | 1 | running | 0 | $58,475 |
| 3 | 9 | 11 | Elliott Sadler | Joe Gibbs Racing | Toyota | 101 | 2 | running | 42 | $46,600 |
| 4 | 7 | 1 | Kurt Busch (i) | Phoenix Racing | Chevrolet | 101 | 2 | running | 0 | $33,075 |
| 5 | 1 | 3 | Austin Dillon | Richard Childress Racing | Chevrolet | 101 | 5 | running | 40 | $38,800 |
| 6 | 13 | 32 | Kyle Larson (R) | Turner Scott Motorsports | Chevrolet | 101 | 2 | running | 39 | $30,850 |
| 7 | 5 | 12 | Sam Hornish Jr. | Penske Racing | Ford | 101 | 61 | running | 39 | $28,710 |
| 8 | 11 | 7 | Regan Smith | JR Motorsports | Chevrolet | 101 | 1 | running | 37 | $27,670 |
| 9 | 14 | 22 | Joey Logano (i) | Penske Racing | Ford | 101 | 3 | running | 0 | $20,550 |
| 10 | 8 | 6 | Trevor Bayne | Roush Fenway Racing | Ford | 101 | 1 | running | 35 | $27,100 |
| 11 | 15 | 54 | Kyle Busch (i) | Joe Gibbs Racing | Toyota | 101 | 0 | running | 0 | $19,325 |
| 12 | 6 | 31 | Justin Allgaier | Turner Scott Motorsports | Chevrolet | 101 | 1 | running | 33 | $24,775 |
| 13 | 18 | 20 | Brian Vickers | Joe Gibbs Racing | Toyota | 101 | 4 | running | 32 | $24,250 |
| 14 | 21 | 19 | Mike Bliss | TriStar Motorsports | Toyota | 101 | 0 | running | 30 | $23,725 |
| 15 | 16 | 43 | Michael Annett | Richard Petty Motorsports | Ford | 101 | 0 | running | 29 | $24,075 |
| 16 | 23 | 44 | Cole Whitt | TriStar Motorsports | Toyota | 101 | 0 | running | 28 | $23,650 |
| 17 | 4 | 2 | Brian Scott | Richard Childress Racing | Chevrolet | 101 | 1 | running | 28 | $23,325 |
| 18 | 27 | 77 | Parker Kligerman | Kyle Busch Motorsports | Toyota | 101 | 0 | running | 26 | $23,000 |
| 19 | 30 | 87 | Joe Nemechek | NEMCO Motorsports | Toyota | 101 | 0 | running | 25 | $22,875 |
| 20 | 12 | 99 | Alex Bowman (R) | RAB Racing | Toyota | 101 | 0 | running | 24 | $23,250 |
| 21 | 20 | 30 | Nelson Piquet Jr. (R) | Turner Scott Motorsports | Chevrolet | 101 | 0 | running | 23 | $22,775 |
| 22 | 36 | 51 | Jeremy Clements | Jeremy Clements Racing | Chevrolet | 101 | 0 | running | 22 | $22,475 |
| 23 | 39 | 4 | Landon Cassill | JD Motorsports | Chevrolet | 101 | 0 | running | 21 | $22,325 |
| 24 | 24 | 14 | Eric McClure | TriStar Motorsports | Toyota | 101 | 0 | running | 20 | $22,200 |
| 25 | 25 | 55 | Jamie Dick | Viva Motorsports | Chevrolet | 101 | 0 | running | 19 | $16,550 |
| 26 | 26 | 98 | Kevin Swindell (R) | Biagi-DenBeste Racing | Ford | 101 | 0 | running | 18 | $15,950 |
| 27 | 3 | 33 | Ty Dillon (i) | Richard Childress Racing | Chevrolet | 101 | 0 | running | 0 | $21,800 |
| 28 | 10 | 5 | Brad Sweet | JR Motorsports | Chevrolet | 101 | 0 | running | 16 | $21,625 |
| 29 | 22 | 85 | Bobby Gerhart | Bobby Gerhart Racing | Chevrolet | 101 | 0 | running | 15 | $15,500 |
| 30 | 38 | 70 | Jeff Green | ML Motorsports | Toyota | 99 | 0 | running | 14 | $21,675 |
| 31 | 29 | 74 | Mike Harmon | Mike Harmon Racing | Dodge | 99 | 0 | running | 13 | $21,250 |
| 32 | 28 | 23 | Robert Richardson Jr. | R3 Motorsports | Chevrolet | 96 | 0 | crash | 12 | $21,130 |
| 33 | 34 | 79 | Jeffrey Earnhardt (R) | Go Green Racing | Ford | 96 | 0 | crash | 11 | $21,010 |
| 34 | 2 | 60 | Travis Pastrana | Roush Fenway Racing | Ford | 95 | 1 | crash | 11 | $21,390 |
| 35 | 32 | 24 | Jason White | SR² Motorsports | Toyota | 95 | 0 | crash | 9 | $20,764 |
| 36 | 33 | 52 | Joey Gase | Jimmy Means Racing | Chevrolet | 90 | 0 | running | 8 | $13,700 |
| 37 | 35 | 01 | Mike Wallace | JD Motorsports | Chevrolet | 87 | 0 | engine | 7 | $19,665 |
| 38 | 40 | 92 | Dexter Stacey (R) | KH Motorsports | Ford | 76 | 0 | axle | 6 | $19,611 |
| 39 | 37 | 40 | Reed Sorenson | The Motorsports Group | Chevrolet | 70 | 0 | engine | 5 | $19,495 |
| 40 | 31 | 89 | Morgan Shepherd | Shepherd Racing Ventures | Dodge | 21 | 0 | rear gear | 4 | $13,430 |
Failed to qualify or withdrew
| 41 | | 00 | Blake Koch | SR² Motorsports | Toyota | | | | | |
| WD | | 10 | Jeff Green | TriStar Motorsports | Toyota | | | | | |
| WD | | 42 | Josh Wise | The Motorsports Group | Chevrolet | | | | | |
Official race results

| Previous race: 2013 Feed the Children 300 | NASCAR Nationwide Series; 2013 season | Next race: 2013 CNBC Prime's The Profit 200 |
