= Luis Cortorreal =

Dominican academic (born 1996)

Luis Cortorreal (born June 17, 1996) is a Dominican academic and editorial coordinator for Soldados de Jesucristo.

== Biography ==
Luis is from Santo Domingo, Dominican Republic. He received an undergraduate professional in computer from Colombina Canario. While studying in Compassion International, he began to study piano at World Vision International and started to work at Onda Musical 1150 kHz AM

He is currently working in Compassion International as an English teacher. He lives in Santo Domingo, Dominican Republic.
