= Wess Stafford =

- Born: Wesley Kenneth Stafford; June 26, 1949 (age 77)
- Occupation: Author
- Spouse: Donna Stafford
- Website: JustAMinute.com

Wesley Kenneth “Wess” Stafford (born June 26, 1949) is the former president and CEO of Compassion International and an advocate for children. Stafford is the author of two books, Too Small to Ignore and Just a Minute, and until August 2015 hosted the daily national radio short feature Speak Up With Compassion®. As a part of his position with Compassion, and his advocacy for children, Stafford is often invited to speak to audiences around the world. In 2008, Stafford was a guest of President George W. Bush and his wife Laura at a State Dinner. In 2009, Stafford spoke at the Willow Creek Association's Global Leadership Summit alongside Bill Hybels, Henry Cloud, Patrick Lencioni, Tony Blair and Bono. In September 2013, Stafford retired from his position of President and CEO of Compassion International, giving that title to Santiago Mellado.

== Biography ==
=== Early life ===
Stafford was raised in rural West Africa as the son of Baptist missionaries in Nielle, Ivory Coast. As a child, Stafford witnessed the hardships of poverty firsthand as he watched many of his childhood friends die of easily treatable diseases. After visiting a grocery store full of food and a pharmacy filled with medicine he cried about the seemingly callous American public, adorned with fancy watches and expensive shoes, unaware of his village's poverty. He later recognized that, while Americans were in fact very generous and caring, they only acted on causes which they were aware of. He eventually found Compassion International and decided to join in order to help bridge the gap between the American public and those in poverty.

Between the ages of 6 and 10, Stafford attended a missionary boarding school for nine months of the year. During his time there, Stafford suffered from physical, emotional, sexual and spiritual abuse. He recounts his story in his book Too Small to Ignore.

=== Personal ===
An outdoorsman and family man, Stafford lives on a small ranch near Colorado Springs, CO, with his wife, Donna, whom he married in 1979, and who was already involved in Compassion's ministry as a child sponsor prior to meeting him. The Staffords have two daughters, Jenny and Katie.

== Education ==
Stafford attended high school in Jerome, AZ, while his parents worked at the Indian Bible Academy to train Navajo pastors in Cottonwood, AZ. During his senior year, the family moved to Illinois where Stafford graduated from Wheaton Academy in 1967.

Stafford has earned degrees from Moody Bible Institute (Broadcast Communications, 1970), Biola University (Bachelor of Arts, Communications, 1975), and Wheaton College (Master of Arts, International Broadcasting, 1977), as well as a Ph.D. from Michigan State University (Doctor of Philosophy in Education, 1986).

In addition, he was awarded honorary doctorate degrees from Biola University (Laws) in 2003, Colorado Christian University (Humanities) in 2005, and Asbury University (Laws) in 2010.

== Career ==
Following his graduation from Moody Bible Institute in 1970, Stafford was drafted into the Army. His draft number was 21, so while he waited to see if he would be chosen to serve, he drove an ambulance in Chicago. Then fluent in English, French, Senari, Jula, Spanish, Czech, German, and Creole, Stafford served four years in the U.S. Army security agency as a Czechoslovak linguist.

After his military service, Stafford worked for a number of relief and development agencies in Haiti until he joined the staff of Compassion International in 1977 and has worked with the ministry, both overseas and at its Global Ministry Center, for more than 30 years. He has served as president and CEO since 1993.

In 1993, soon after becoming president, Stafford experienced what he calls his “Prairie Vision” which led to the revision of Compassion's mission statement and changed the focus of the organization to become advocates for children in poverty.

As Compassion's president and CEO, Stafford developed programs that have extended the organization's focus beyond child sponsorship. He led the launch of the Leadership Development Program and student Alumni Associations in 2010, both of which started in the Philippines. Students around the world now call Stafford “Papa Wess.” The launch of the Child Survival Program took place under his leadership as well, in Haiti, Peru, India and Ecuador in 2003.

Stafford wants that his legacy be the advocacy for children and devotes time speaking, writing about and championing his belief that every child is precious.

“The spirit of a little child is a lot like wet cement. When a child is young it takes little effort to make an impression that can last a lifetime.”

“In the heart of a child, one moment … can last forever.”

Prior to retirement from his organization, he assisted in an independent research effort which indicated an improvement in the clients which were served by the sponsorship program. He has served on the Board of Directors for the National Religious Broadcasters.

== Worldview ==
Stafford says his passion for advocating for children, especially those in poverty, was born out of his childhood in West Africa, his loving relationship with his parents, and his personal experience with abuse.

As a child, he accompanied his father, Kenneth, on trips to bring the gospel to neighboring villages. As an adult, Stafford maintained a close relationship with his father, viewing him as a mentor. Ken worked closely with Stafford as the chaplain at Compassion's Global Ministry Center until retiring in 2001.

Stafford believes that the most strategic way to break the cycle of poverty is by investing holistically in children, meeting their physical, spiritual, socioeconomic and vocational needs to give them a hope and a future.

== Bibliography ==
- Too Small to Ignore: Why the Least of These Matters Most ISBN 1-4000-7392-8
- Just a Minute ISBN 0-8024-0472-3

== See also ==
- Compassion International
- National Religious Broadcasters
