= 2013 Feed the Children 300 =

15th race of the 2013 NASCAR Nationwide Series

Race details
- Race 15 of 33 of the 2013 NASCAR Nationwide Series
- Date: June 28, 2013
- Official name: 13th Annual Feed the Children 300
- Location: Sparta, Kentucky, Kentucky Speedway
- Course: Permanent racing facility
- Course length: 2.41 km (1.5 miles)
- Distance: 200 laps, 255 mi (410.382 km)
- Scheduled distance: 200 laps, 300 mi (482.803 km)
- Average speed: 131.162 miles per hour (211.085 km/h)

Pole position
Driver	Austin Dillon	Richard Childress Racing
- Time: 30.724

Most laps led
Driver	Kyle Busch	Joe Gibbs Racing
- Laps: 74

Winner
No. 22	Brad Keselowski	Penske Racing

Television in the United States
- Network: ESPN2
- Announcers: Allen Bestwick, Dale Jarrett, Andy Petree

Radio in the United States
- Radio: Performance Racing Network

The 2013 Feed the Children 300 was the 15th stock car race of the 2013 NASCAR Nationwide Series and the 13th iteration of the event. The race was held on Friday, June 28, 2013, in Sparta, Kentucky, at Kentucky Speedway, a 1.5-mile (2.41 km) tri-oval speedway. The race was shortened from its scheduled 200 laps to 170 due to rain cutting the race short. At race's end, Brad Keselowski, driving for Penske Racing would lead the last 15 laps of the race to win his 22nd career NASCAR Nationwide Series win and his second win of the season. To fill out the podium, Elliott Sadler of Joe Gibbs Racing and Matt Crafton of Richard Childress Racing would finish second and third, respectively.

== Background ==
The layout of Kentucky Speedway. the venue where the race was held.

Kentucky Speedway is a 1.5-mile (2.4 km) tri-oval speedway in Sparta, Kentucky, which has hosted ARCA, NASCAR and Indy Racing League racing annually since it opened in 2000. The track is currently owned and operated by Speedway Motorsports, Inc. and Jerry Carroll, who, along with four other investors, owned Kentucky Speedway until 2008. The speedway has a grandstand capacity of 117,000. Construction of the speedway began in 1998 and was completed in mid-2000. The speedway has hosted the Gander RV & Outdoors Truck Series, Xfinity Series, IndyCar Series, Indy Lights, and most recently, the NASCAR Cup Series beginning in 2011.

=== Entry list ===
- (R) denotes rookie driver.
- (i) denotes driver who is ineligible for series driver points.

#	Driver	Team	Make	Sponsor
00	Blake Koch	SR² Motorsports	Toyota	M&W Transportation
01	Mike Wallace	JD Motorsports	Chevrolet	Drive Sober Or Get Pulled Over
2	Brian Scott	Richard Childress Racing	Chevrolet	Shore Lodge
3	Austin Dillon	Richard Childress Racing	Chevrolet	AdvoCare
4	Landon Cassill	JD Motorsports	Chevrolet	JD Motorsports
5	Brad Sweet	JR Motorsports	Chevrolet	Great Clips
6	Trevor Bayne	Roush Fenway Racing	Ford	Help a Hero
7	Regan Smith	JR Motorsports	Chevrolet	Hellmann's Happy 100 Years
10	Jeff Green	TriStar Motorsports	Toyota	TriStar Motorsports
11	Elliott Sadler	Joe Gibbs Racing	Toyota	OneMain Financial
12	Sam Hornish Jr.	Penske Racing	Ford	Penske Truck Leasing
14	Eric McClure	TriStar Motorsports	Toyota	Hefty, Reynolds Wrap
15	Scott Riggs*	Rick Ware Racing	Ford	Rick Ware Racing
19	Mike Bliss	TriStar Motorsports	Toyota	TriStar Motorsports
20	Brian Vickers	Joe Gibbs Racing	Toyota	Dollar General
22	Brad Keselowski (i)	Penske Racing	Ford	Discount Tire
23	Harrison Rhodes	Rick Ware Racing	Ford	Energize Ministries, Vecoplan
24	Ken Butler III	SR² Motorsports	Toyota	Taylor Brooks Salon, Five Star Lodge & Stables
30	Nelson Piquet Jr. (R)	Turner Scott Motorsports	Chevrolet	Worx Yard Tools
31	Justin Allgaier	Turner Scott Motorsports	Chevrolet	Brandt Professional Agriculture
32	Kyle Larson (R)	Turner Scott Motorsports	Chevrolet	Clear Men Scalp Therapy
33	Matt Crafton (i)	Richard Childress Racing	Chevrolet	Menards, Rheem
40	Reed Sorenson	The Motorsports Group	Chevrolet	Swisher E-Cigarette
42	Josh Wise	The Motorsports Group	Chevrolet	The Motorsports Group
43	Michael Annett	Richard Petty Motorsports	Ford	Pilot Travel Centers
44	Cole Whitt	TriStar Motorsports	Toyota	TriStar Motorsports
46	J. J. Yeley (i)	The Motorsports Group	Chevrolet	The Motorsports Group
51	Jeremy Clements	Jeremy Clements Racing	Chevrolet	Jeremy Clements Racing
52	Joey Gase	Jimmy Means Racing	Toyota	Donate Life
54	Kyle Busch (i)	Joe Gibbs Racing	Toyota	Monster Energy
55	Jamie Dick	Viva Motorsports	Chevrolet	Viva Motorsports
60	Travis Pastrana	Roush Fenway Racing	Ford	Roush Fenway Racing
70	Johanna Long	ML Motorsports	Chevrolet	Wish For Our Heroes
73	Derrike Cope	Creation-Cope Racing	Chevrolet	MAXelence MVP
74	Carl Long	Mike Harmon Racing	Chevrolet	Oleofinos, VMP Nutrition
77	Parker Kligerman	Kyle Busch Motorsports	Toyota	Toyota, Camp Horsin' Around
79	Bryan Silas (i)	Go Green Racing	Ford	Koma Unwind, Bell Trucks
87	Joe Nemechek	NEMCO Motorsports	Toyota	R.G.E. Manufacturing
89	Morgan Shepherd	Shepherd Racing Ventures	Chevrolet	Racing with Jesus
92	Dexter Stacey (R)	KH Motorsports	Ford	Maddie's Place Rocks
98	Kevin Swindell	Biagi-DenBeste Racing	Ford	Carroll Shelby Engine Co., DenBeste Water Solutions
99	Alex Bowman (R)	RAB Racing	Toyota	St. Jude Children's Research Hospital
Official entry list

== Practice ==
=== First practice ===
The first practice session was held on Thursday, June 27, at 6:30 PM EST, and would last for 45 minutes. Matt Crafton of Richard Childress Racing would set the fastest time in the session, with a lap of 31.259 and an average speed of 172.750 miles per hour (278.014 km/h).

Pos.	#	Driver	Team	Make	Time	Speed
1	33	Matt Crafton (i)	Richard Childress Racing	Chevrolet	31.259	172.750
2	12	Sam Hornish Jr.	Penske Racing	Ford	31.422	171.854
3	44	Cole Whitt	TriStar Motorsports	Toyota	31.427	171.827
Full first practice results

=== Second and final practice ===
The second and final practice session, sometimes referred to as Happy Hour, was held on Friday, June 28, at 9:00 AM EST, and would last for one hour and 30 minutes. Travis Pastrana of Roush Fenway Racing would set the fastest time in the session, with a lap of 30.687 and an average speed of 175.970 miles per hour (283.196 km/h).

Pos.	#	Driver	Team	Make	Time	Speed
1	60	Travis Pastrana	Roush Fenway Racing	Ford	30.687	175.970
2	33	Matt Crafton (i)	Richard Childress Racing	Chevrolet	30.705	175.867
3	99	Alex Bowman (R)	RAB Racing	Toyota	30.929	174.593
Full Happy Hour practice results

== Qualifying ==
Qualifying was held on Friday, June 28, at 3:35 PM EST. Each driver would have two laps to set a fastest time; the fastest of the two would count as their official qualifying lap.

Austin Dillon of Richard Childress Racing would win the pole, setting a time of 30.724 and an average speed of 175.758 miles per hour (282.855 km/h).

Dexter Stacey would be the only driver to fail to qualify.

=== Full qualifying results ===
Pos.	#	Driver	Team	Make	Time	Speed
1	3	Austin Dillon	Richard Childress Racing	Chevrolet	30.724	175.758
2	60	Travis Pastrana	Roush Fenway Racing	Ford	31.093	173.673
3	12	Sam Hornish Jr.	Penske Racing	Ford	31.130	173.466
4	6	Trevor Bayne	Roush Fenway Racing	Ford	31.144	173.388
5	54	Kyle Busch (i)	Joe Gibbs Racing	Toyota	31.145	173.383
6	11	Elliott Sadler	Joe Gibbs Racing	Toyota	31.206	173.044
7	31	Justin Allgaier	Turner Scott Motorsports	Chevrolet	31.303	172.507
8	33	Matt Crafton (i)	Richard Childress Racing	Chevrolet	31.322	172.403
9	44	Cole Whitt	TriStar Motorsports	Toyota	31.332	172.348
10	99	Alex Bowman (R)	RAB Racing	Toyota	31.349	172.254
11	20	Brian Vickers	Joe Gibbs Racing	Toyota	31.360	172.194
12	77	Parker Kligerman	Kyle Busch Motorsports	Toyota	31.376	172.106
13	43	Michael Annett	Richard Petty Motorsports	Ford	31.404	171.953
14	7	Regan Smith	JR Motorsports	Chevrolet	31.418	171.876
15	2	Brian Scott	Richard Childress Racing	Chevrolet	31.462	171.636
16	5	Brad Sweet	JR Motorsports	Chevrolet	31.518	171.331
17	98	Kevin Swindell	Biagi-DenBeste Racing	Ford	31.544	171.189
18	30	Nelson Piquet Jr. (R)	Turner Scott Motorsports	Chevrolet	31.665	170.535
19	22	Brad Keselowski (i)	Penske Racing	Ford	31.702	170.336
20	70	Johanna Long	ML Motorsports	Chevrolet	31.799	169.817
21	32	Kyle Larson (R)	Turner Scott Motorsports	Chevrolet	31.816	169.726
22	87	Joe Nemechek	NEMCO Motorsports	Toyota	31.881	169.380
23	55	Jamie Dick	Viva Motorsports	Chevrolet	31.954	168.993
24	19	Mike Bliss	TriStar Motorsports	Toyota	32.021	168.639
25	4	Landon Cassill	JD Motorsports	Chevrolet	32.071	168.376
26	10	Jeff Green	TriStar Motorsports	Toyota	32.111	168.167
27	01	Mike Wallace	JD Motorsports	Chevrolet	32.214	167.629
28	40	Reed Sorenson	The Motorsports Group	Chevrolet	32.399	166.672
29	24	Ken Butler III	SR² Motorsports	Toyota	32.441	166.456
30	00	Blake Koch	SR² Motorsports	Toyota	32.559	165.853
31	46	J. J. Yeley (i)	The Motorsports Group	Chevrolet	32.559	165.853
32	52	Joey Gase	Jimmy Means Racing	Chevrolet	32.648	165.401
33	79	Bryan Silas (i)	Go Green Racing	Ford	32.658	165.350
34	23	Harrison Rhodes	Rick Ware Racing	Ford	32.671	165.284
35	74	Carl Long	Mike Harmon Racing	Chevrolet	32.676	165.259
36	42	Josh Wise	The Motorsports Group	Chevrolet	32.679	165.244
37	73	Derrike Cope	Creation-Cope Racing	Chevrolet	33.109	163.098
Qualified by owner's points
38	51	Jeremy Clements	Jeremy Clements Racing	Chevrolet	—	—
39	14	Eric McClure	TriStar Motorsports	Toyota	—	—
Last car to qualify on time
40	89	Morgan Shepherd	Shepherd Racing Ventures	Chevrolet	33.442	161.474
Failed to qualify or withdrew
41	92	Dexter Stacey (R)	KH Motorsports	Ford	34.002	158.814
WD	15	Scott Riggs	Rick Ware Racing	Ford	—	—
Official starting lineup

== Race results ==
Fin.	St	#	Driver	Team	Make	Laps	Led	Status	Pts	Winnings
1	19	22	Brad Keselowski (i)	Penske Racing	Ford	170	59	running	0	$83,975
2	6	11	Elliott Sadler	Joe Gibbs Racing	Toyota	170	9	running	43	$61,400
3	8	33	Matt Crafton (i)	Richard Childress Racing	Chevrolet	170	8	running	0	$49,150
4	11	20	Brian Vickers	Joe Gibbs Racing	Toyota	170	0	running	40	$34,150
5	5	54	Kyle Busch (i)	Joe Gibbs Racing	Toyota	170	74	running	0	$27,500
6	1	3	Austin Dillon	Richard Childress Racing	Chevrolet	170	18	running	39	$30,775
7	21	32	Kyle Larson (R)	Turner Scott Motorsports	Chevrolet	170	0	running	37	$26,175
8	18	30	Nelson Piquet Jr. (R)	Turner Scott Motorsports	Chevrolet	170	0	running	36	$23,975
9	3	12	Sam Hornish Jr.	Penske Racing	Ford	170	1	running	36	$22,950
10	10	99	Alex Bowman (R)	RAB Racing	Toyota	170	0	running	34	$23,275
11	17	98	Kevin Swindell	Biagi-DenBeste Racing	Ford	170	1	running	34	$16,200
12	4	6	Trevor Bayne	Roush Fenway Racing	Ford	170	0	running	32	$21,350
13	7	31	Justin Allgaier	Turner Scott Motorsports	Chevrolet	170	0	running	31	$20,800
14	16	5	Brad Sweet	JR Motorsports	Chevrolet	170	0	running	30	$20,250
15	2	60	Travis Pastrana	Roush Fenway Racing	Ford	170	0	running	29	$21,200
16	12	77	Parker Kligerman	Kyle Busch Motorsports	Toyota	170	0	running	28	$19,800
17	15	2	Brian Scott	Richard Childress Racing	Chevrolet	169	0	running	27	$19,675
18	13	43	Michael Annett	Richard Petty Motorsports	Ford	169	0	running	26	$19,525
19	24	19	Mike Bliss	TriStar Motorsports	Toyota	169	0	running	25	$19,400
20	20	70	Johanna Long	ML Motorsports	Chevrolet	168	0	running	24	$19,775
21	27	01	Mike Wallace	JD Motorsports	Chevrolet	168	0	running	23	$19,325
22	28	40	Reed Sorenson	The Motorsports Group	Chevrolet	168	0	running	22	$19,025
23	39	14	Eric McClure	TriStar Motorsports	Toyota	167	0	running	21	$18,875
24	29	24	Ken Butler III	SR² Motorsports	Toyota	167	0	running	20	$18,725
25	38	51	Jeremy Clements	Jeremy Clements Racing	Chevrolet	166	0	running	19	$19,075
26	33	79	Bryan Silas (i)	Go Green Racing	Ford	166	0	running	0	$18,475
27	23	55	Jamie Dick	Viva Motorsports	Chevrolet	165	0	running	17	$18,350
28	35	74	Carl Long	Mike Harmon Racing	Chevrolet	164	0	running	16	$18,225
29	34	23	Harrison Rhodes	Rick Ware Racing	Ford	164	0	running	15	$18,075
30	14	7	Regan Smith	JR Motorsports	Chevrolet	153	0	running	14	$18,250
31	9	44	Cole Whitt	TriStar Motorsports	Toyota	107	0	transmission	13	$17,825
32	32	52	Joey Gase	Jimmy Means Racing	Chevrolet	90	0	engine	12	$11,700
33	22	87	Joe Nemechek	NEMCO Motorsports	Toyota	52	0	engine	11	$17,590
34	30	00	Blake Koch	SR² Motorsports	Toyota	16	0	brakes	10	$11,480
35	40	89	Morgan Shepherd	Shepherd Racing Ventures	Chevrolet	15	0	handling	9	$11,359
36	25	4	Landon Cassill	JD Motorsports	Chevrolet	14	0	engine	8	$16,555
37	31	46	J. J. Yeley (i)	The Motorsports Group	Chevrolet	10	0	transmission	0	$10,520
38	36	42	Josh Wise	The Motorsports Group	Chevrolet	7	0	vibration	6	$10,486
39	37	73	Derrike Cope	Creation-Cope Racing	Chevrolet	3	0	rear gear	5	$10,350
40	26	10	Jeff Green	TriStar Motorsports	Toyota	3	0	vibration	4	$10,250
Failed to qualify or withdrew
41		92	Dexter Stacey (R)	KH Motorsports	Ford					
WD		15	Scott Riggs	Rick Ware Racing	Ford					
Official race results

Previous race: 2013 Johnsonville Sausage 200	NASCAR Nationwide Series; 2013 season	Next race: 2013 Subway Firecracker 250
