= Santiago Mellado =

Salvadoran-American non-profit executive

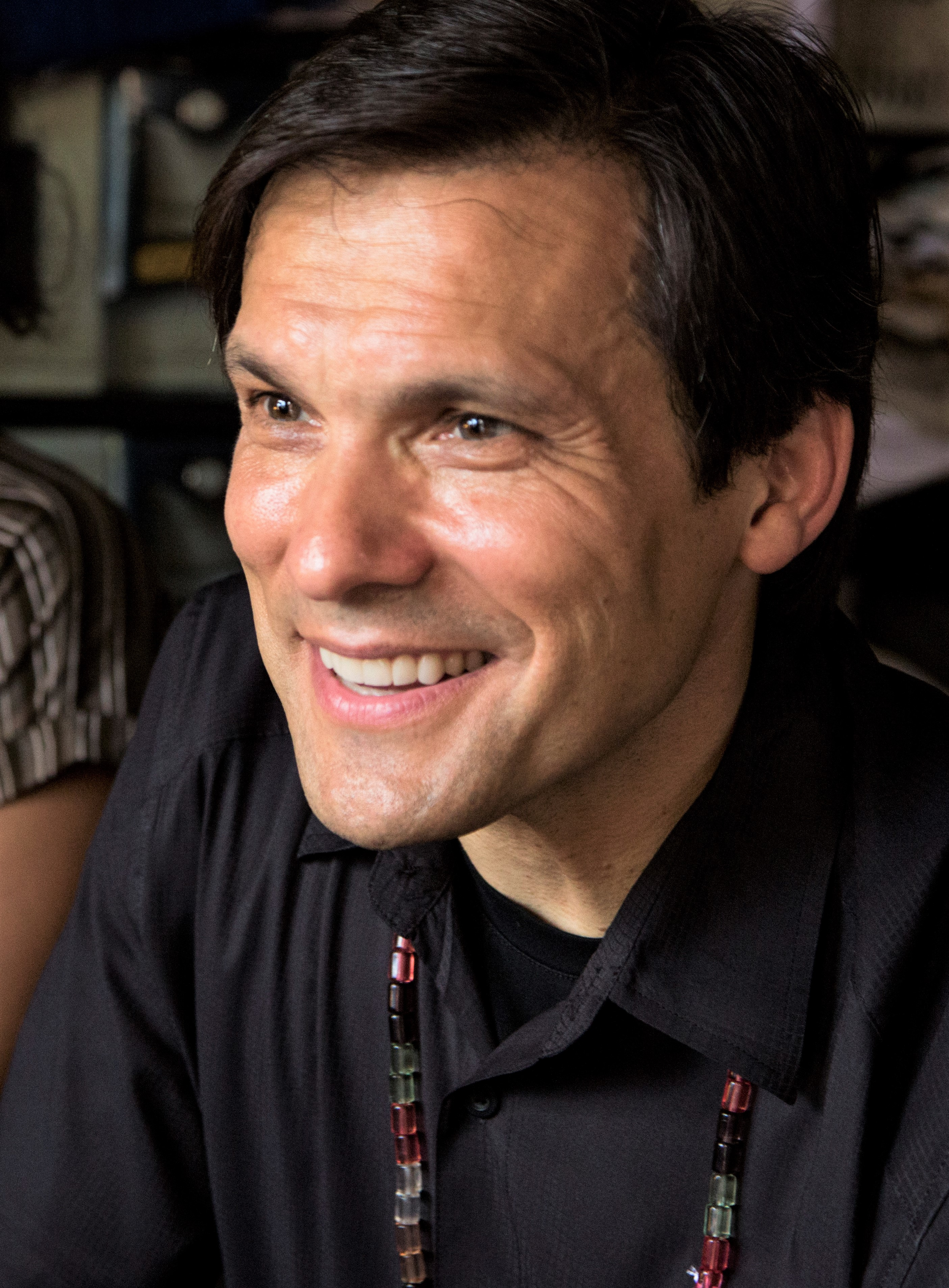
- Born: April 6, 1963 (age 63); Santa Ana, El Salvador
- Education: Harvard University Southern Methodist University
- Occupations: President and CEO of Compassion International
- Years active: 2013–present
- Board member of: Compassion International Fuller Theological Seminary National Association of Evangelicals Art of the Olympians
- Spouse: Leanne (m. 1986)
- Children: Ester and son-in-law Matt, Elisabeth and son-in-law Matthew, Davy and daughter-in-law Rachel.

Santiago "Jimmy" Heriberto Mellado (born April 6, 1963) is a Salvadoran-American non-profit executive and former athlete. He is currently the President and CEO of Compassion International, a Christian holistic child development organization dedicated to the long-term development of children living in poverty around the world, which is based in Colorado Springs, Colorado. Mellado previously served as president of the Willow Creek Association (WCA) in South Barrington, Illinois, from 1993 to 2013. He also competed in the 1988 Summer Olympics and 1987 Pan American Games as a decathlete. He serves as a trustee for Fuller Theological Seminary and on the board of directors for the National Association of Evangelicals. He also serves on the Board of Directors for Art of the Olympians.

== Education ==
Mellado graduated cum laude with a degree in Mechanical Engineering from Southern Methodist University in 1985. He later graduated from Harvard Business School in 1991. While he was at Harvard, he wrote a case study on the Willow Creek Community Church which has become a part of the curriculum at Harvard Business School.

== Olympic Games ==
Mellado competed in the 1988 Summer Olympics in Seoul, South Korea, representing his birth nation, El Salvador, in the decathlon. He placed 26th of 42 athletes who qualified, and set six national records for the highest-ever performance in the decathlon, men's high jump, 400m, 110m high hurdles, pole vault, and javelin. The decathlon record still stands 37 years later.

== Pan American Games ==
Mellado competed in the 1987 Pan American Games and placed fourth in the decathlon.

== Compassion International ==
Mellado became the president and chief executive officer (CEO) of Compassion International in 2013 when he replaced retiring CEO Wess Stafford. In 2019, Mellado's annual compensation was $419,184 according to the organization's IRS filings.

== Personal ==
He and his wife, Leanne, were married in 1986. They have three children, one daughter-in-law, two sons-in-law, and four grandchildren.
