= 2013 Sylvania 300 =

Race details
- Race 28 of 36 in the 2013 NASCAR Sprint Cup Series
- The 2013 Sylvania 300 program cover, featuring Denny Hamlin. "Calling His Shot"
- Date: September 22, 2013
- Location: New Hampshire Motor Speedway in Loudon, New Hampshire
- Course: Permanent racing facility
- Course length: 1.058 miles (1.703 km)
- Distance: 300 laps, 317.4 mi (510.805 km)
- Weather: Mild with temperatures approaching 75.9 °F (24.4 °C); wind speeds up to 13 miles per hour (21 km/h)

Pole position
Driver	Ryan Newman	Stewart–Haas Racing
- Time: 27.904 second

Most laps led
Driver	Matt Kenseth	Joe Gibbs Racing
- Laps: 106

Winner
No. 20	Matt Kenseth	Joe Gibbs Racing

Television in the United States
- Network: ESPN
- Announcers: Allen Bestwick, Dale Jarrett and Andy Petree

The 2013 Sylvania 300 was a NASCAR Sprint Cup Series stock car race held on September 22, 2013, at New Hampshire Motor Speedway in Loudon, New Hampshire. Contested over 300 laps, it was the twenty-eighth in the 2013 NASCAR Sprint Cup Series, as well as the second race in the ten-race Chase for the Sprint Cup, which ends the season. Matt Kenseth of Joe Gibbs Racing won the race, his seventh of the season. Kyle Busch finished second. Greg Biffle, Jimmie Johnson, and Jamie McMurray rounded out the top five.

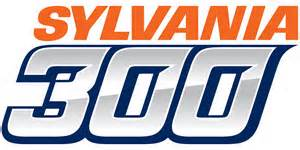
The race logo for the 2013 Sylvania 300.

== Background ==
=== Entry list ===
(R) - Denotes rookie driver.

(i) - Denotes driver who is ineligible for series driver points.

No.	Driver	Team	Manufacturer
1	Jamie McMurray	Earnhardt Ganassi Racing	Chevrolet
2	Brad Keselowski	Penske Racing	Ford
5	Kasey Kahne	Hendrick Motorsports	Chevrolet
7	Dave Blaney	Tommy Baldwin Racing	Chevrolet
9	Marcos Ambrose	Richard Petty Motorsports	Ford
10	Danica Patrick (R)	Stewart–Haas Racing	Chevrolet
11	Denny Hamlin	Joe Gibbs Racing	Toyota
13	Casey Mears	Germain Racing	Ford
14	Mark Martin	Stewart–Haas Racing	Chevrolet
15	Clint Bowyer	Michael Waltrip Racing	Toyota
16	Greg Biffle	Roush Fenway Racing	Ford
17	Ricky Stenhouse Jr. (R)	Roush Fenway Racing	Ford
18	Kyle Busch	Joe Gibbs Racing	Toyota
20	Matt Kenseth	Joe Gibbs Racing	Toyota
22	Joey Logano	Penske Racing	Ford
24	Jeff Gordon	Hendrick Motorsports	Chevrolet
27	Paul Menard	Richard Childress Racing	Chevrolet
29	Kevin Harvick	Richard Childress Racing	Chevrolet
30	Kevin Swindell (i)	Swan Racing	Toyota
31	Jeff Burton	Richard Childress Racing	Chevrolet
32	Timmy Hill (R)	FAS Lane Racing	Ford
33	Tony Raines (i)	Circle Sport	Chevrolet
34	David Ragan	Front Row Motorsports	Ford
35	Josh Wise (i)	Front Row Motorsports	Ford
36	J. J. Yeley	Tommy Baldwin Racing	Chevrolet
38	David Gilliland	Front Row Motorsports	Ford
39	Ryan Newman	Stewart–Haas Racing	Chevrolet
40	Landon Cassill (i)	Circle Sport	Chevrolet
42	Juan Pablo Montoya	Earnhardt Ganassi Racing	Chevrolet
43	Aric Almirola	Richard Petty Motorsports	Ford
47	A. J. Allmendinger	JTG Daugherty Racing	Toyota
48	Jimmie Johnson	Hendrick Motorsports	Chevrolet
51	Michael McDowell	HScott Motorsports	Chevrolet
55	Brian Vickers (i)	Michael Waltrip Racing	Toyota
56	Martin Truex Jr.	Michael Waltrip Racing	Toyota
78	Kurt Busch	Furniture Row Racing	Chevrolet
83	David Reutimann	BK Racing	Toyota
87	Joe Nemechek (i)	NEMCO-Jay Robinson Racing	Toyota
88	Dale Earnhardt Jr.	Hendrick Motorsports	Chevrolet
93	Travis Kvapil	BK Racing	Toyota
95	Scott Riggs	Leavine Family Racing	Ford
98	Johnny Sauter (i)	Phil Parsons Racing	Ford
99	Carl Edwards	Roush Fenway Racing	Ford
Official entry list

== Results ==
=== Qualifying ===
Grid	No.	Driver	Team	Manufacturer	Time	Speed
1	39	Ryan Newman	Stewart–Haas Racing	Chevrolet	27.904	136.497
2	5	Kasey Kahne	Hendrick Motorsports	Chevrolet	27.989	136.082
3	24	Jeff Gordon	Hendrick Motorsports	Chevrolet	27.995	136.053
4	78	Kurt Busch	Furniture Row Racing	Chevrolet	28.033	135.868
5	56	Martin Truex Jr.	Michael Waltrip Racing	Toyota	28.081	135.636
6	22	Joey Logano	Penske Racing	Ford	28.104	135.525
7	27	Paul Menard	Richard Childress Racing	Chevrolet	28.117	135.463
8	29	Kevin Harvick	Richard Childress Racing	Chevrolet	22.128	135.410
9	20	Matt Kenseth	Joe Gibbs Racing	Toyota	28.136	135.371
10	16	Greg Biffle	Roush Fenway Racing	Ford	28.170	135.208
11	48	Jimmie Johnson	Hendrick Motorsports	Chevrolet	28.187	135.126
12	18	Kyle Busch	Joe Gibbs Racing	Toyota	28.193	135.097
13	43	Aric Almirola	Richard Petty Motorsports	Ford	28.198	135.073
14	11	Denny Hamlin	Joe Gibbs Racing	Toyota	28.209	135.021
15	42	Juan Pablo Montoya	Earnhardt Ganassi Racing	Chevrolet	28.216	134.987
16	15	Clint Bowyer	Michael Waltrip Racing	Toyota	28.236	134.892
17	88	Dale Earnhardt Jr.	Hendrick Motorsports	Chevrolet	28.323	134.477
18	14	Mark Martin	Stewart–Haas Racing	Chevrolet	28.335	134.420
19	34	David Ragan	Front Row Motorsports	Ford	28.362	134.292
20	2	Brad Keselowski	Penske Racing	Ford	28.378	134.217
21	10	Danica Patrick	Stewart–Haas Racing	Chevrolet	28.383	134.193
22	9	Marcos Ambrose	Richard Petty Motorsports	Ford	28.396	134.132
23	1	Jamie McMurray	Earnhardt Ganassi Racing	Chevrolet	28.428	133.981
24	38	David Gilliland	Front Row Motorsports	Ford	28.468	133.792
25	31	Jeff Burton	Richard Childress Racing	Chevrolet	28.473	133.769
26	99	Carl Edwards	Roush Fenway Racing	Ford	28.501	133.637
27	51	Michael McDowell	Phoenix Racing	Chevrolet	28.520	133.548
28	47	Bobby Labonte	JTG Daugherty Racing	Toyota	28.526	133.520
29	55	Kenny Wallace	Michael Waltrip Racing	Toyota	28.550	133.408
30	93	Travis Kvapil	BK Racing	Toyota	28.573	133.301
31	17	Ricky Stenhouse Jr.	Roush Fenway Racing	Ford	28.577	133.282
32	40	Landon Cassill	Circle Sport	Chevrolet	28.601	133.170
33	30	Kevin Swindell	Swan Racing	Toyota	28.775	132.365
34	13	Casey Mears	Germain Racing	Ford	28.804	132.232
35	83	David Reutimann	BK Racing	Toyota	28.811	132.200
36	87	Joe Nemechek	NEMCO-Jay Robinson Racing	Toyota	28.819	132.163
37	36	J. J. Yeley	Tommy Baldwin Racing	Chevrolet	28.835	132.089
38	7	Dave Blaney	Tommy Baldwin Racing	Chevrolet	28.844	132.048
39	33	Tony Raines	Circle Sport	Chevrolet	28.965	131.497
40	95	Scott Riggs	Leavine Family Racing	Ford	29.067	131.035
41	98	Johnny Sauter	Phil Parsons Racing	Ford	29.161	130.613
42	32	Timmy Hill	FAS Lane Racing	Ford	29.573	128.767
43	35	Josh Wise	Front Row Motorsports	Ford	–	–
Qualifying Results

1. Josh Wise lost a shock absorber coming to the green flag and failed to complete a qualifying lap.

=== Race results ===
Pos	Car	Driver	Team	Manufacturer	Laps	Led	Points^{1}
1	20	Matt Kenseth	Joe Gibbs Racing	Toyota	300	106	48
2	18	Kyle Busch	Joe Gibbs Racing	Toyota	300	0	42
3	16	Greg Biffle	Roush Fenway Racing	Ford	300	0	41
4	48	Jimmie Johnson	Hendrick Motorsports	Chevrolet	300	1	41
5	1	Jamie McMurray	Earnhardt Ganassi Racing	Chevrolet	300	0	39
6	88	Dale Earnhardt Jr.	Hendrick Motorsports	Chevrolet	300	17	39
7	55	Brian Vickers	Michael Waltrip Racing	Toyota	300	0	0
8	31	Jeff Burton	Richard Childress Racing	Chevrolet	300	0	36
9	99	Carl Edwards	Roush Fenway Racing	Ford	300	0	35
10	56	Martin Truex Jr.	Michael Waltrip Racing	Toyota	300	98	35
11	2	Brad Keselowski	Penske Racing	Ford	300	2	34
12	11	Denny Hamlin	Joe Gibbs Racing	Toyota	300	0	32
13	78	Kurt Busch	Furniture Row Racing	Chevrolet	300	0	31
14	22	Joey Logano	Penske Racing	Ford	300	1	31
15	24	Jeff Gordon	Hendrick Motorsports	Chevrolet	300	36	30
16	39	Ryan Newman	Stewart–Haas Racing	Chevrolet	300	2	29
17	15	Clint Bowyer	Michael Waltrip Racing	Toyota	300	1	28
18	9	Marcos Ambrose	Richard Petty Motorsports	Ford	300	0	26
19	42	Juan Pablo Montoya	Earnhardt Ganassi Racing	Chevrolet	300	0	25
20	29	Kevin Harvick	Richard Childress Racing	Chevrolet	300	0	24
21	43	Aric Almirola	Richard Petty Motorsports	Ford	300	0	23
22	27	Paul Menard	Richard Childress Racing	Chevrolet	300	0	22
23	14	Mark Martin	Stewart–Haas Racing	Chevrolet	300	0	21
24	17	Ricky Stenhouse Jr.	Roush Fenway Racing	Ford	300	0	20
25	13	Casey Mears	Germain Racing	Ford	300	0	19
26	83	David Reutimann	BK Racing	Toyota	300	0	18
27	10	Danica Patrick	Stewart–Haas Racing	Chevrolet	300	0	17
28	93	Travis Kvapil	BK Racing	Toyota	300	0	16
29	34	David Ragan	Front Row Motorsports	Ford	299	0	15
30	51	Michael McDowell	Phoenix Racing	Chevrolet	297	0	14
31	7	Dave Blaney	Tommy Baldwin Racing	Chevrolet	297	0	13
32	35	Josh Wise	Front Row Motorsports	Ford	297	0	0
33	36	J. J. Yeley	Tommy Baldwin Racing	Chevrolet	296	1	12
34	40	Landon Cassill	Circle Sport	Chevrolet	296	0	0
35	87	Joe Nemechek	NEMCO-Jay Robinson Racing	Toyota	296	0	0
36	32	Timmy Hill	FAS Lane Racing	Ford	293	0	8
37	5	Kasey Kahne	Hendrick Motorsports	Chevrolet	278	31	8
38	30	Kevin Swindell	Swan Racing	Toyota	244	0	0
39	38	David Gilliland	Front Row Motorsports	Ford	239	0	5
40	47	Bobby Labonte	JTG Daugherty Racing	Toyota	161	0	4
41	33	Tony Raines	Circle Sport	Chevrolet	128	0	0
42	98	Johnny Sauter	Phil Parsons Racing	Ford	103	0	0
43	95	Scott Riggs	Leavine Family Racing	Ford	92	0	1
Race Results

Notes

^1 Points include 3 Chase for the Sprint Cup points for winning, 1 point for leading a lap, and 1 point for most laps led.

== Standings after the race ==
Drivers' Championship standings
	Pos	Driver	Points
	1	Matt Kenseth	2111
	2	Kyle Busch	2097 (-14)
	3	Jimmie Johnson	2093 (-18)
1	4	Carl Edwards	2075 (-36)
6	5	Greg Biffle	2073 (-38)
2	6	Kevin Harvick	2072 (-39)
1	7	Kurt Busch	2071 (-40)
1	8	Jeff Gordon	2069 (-42)
1	9	Ryan Newman	2064 (-47)
1	10	Clint Bowyer	2063 (-48)
2	11	Dale Earnhardt Jr.	2049 (-62)
	12	Joey Logano	2042 (-69)
3	13	Kasey Kahne	2040 (-71)

Manufacturers' Championship standings
	Pos	Manufacturer	Points
1	1	Toyota	188
1	2	Chevrolet	188 (-0)
	3	Ford	149 (-39)

- Note: Only the first thirteen positions are included for the driver standings.

Previous race: 2013 GEICO 400	Sprint Cup Series; 2013 season	Next race: 2013 AAA 400
