= Compassion Suisse =

Compassion Suisse is a Christian child sponsorship organisation dedicated to the long-term development of children living in poverty around the world. Compassion Suisse is the Swiss branch of Compassion International whose headquarters are in Colorado Springs. Compassion was founded in 1952 by Reverend Everett Swanson to help children orphaned by war in South Korea. Compassion International's programs operate in over 29 developing countries and currently help more than 2.3 million children around the world.

== History ==
Compassion Switzerland was started in 2003, based from the CEO's Concise home. In the same year, an association with the name Compassion Suisse was officially registered. In the first few years of their ministry, Compassion Suisse laid its focus on the French-speaking part of Switzerland. In 2009, the first office in the German-speaking part was founded in Aarau. In the same year, the main offices were moved to Yverdon. Currently, the CEO of Compassion Suisse is Christian Willi.

Since 2006, Compassion is recognized by the Swiss Evangelical Alliance.

Today, a growing number of children are helped by Compassion Suisse. Compassion Suisse is part of a worldwide network of people helping children. In partnership with Compassion USA, Canada, Australia, The Netherlands, France, New Zealand, Italy, Germany, South Korea, Spain and the United Kingdom, over 2.3 million children are helped by Compassion's programs. Compassion Suisse has grown from a staff of two to a network of half a dozen paid staff members, plus several dedicated advocates and prayer partners.

== Programs ==
Compassion's programs minister to the needs of individual children living in poverty throughout all stages of development; from the womb to university. Their programs also operate exclusively through the local church in developing countries. Their programs are: - Child Survival Program - Child Sponsorship Program - Leadership Development Program - Complementary Interventions.

== Where They Work ==
Compassion's programs are currently operating in the following 29 countries. Each country office is staffed by local country personnel.

| Africa | Asia | Central America | South America |
|---|---|---|---|
| Burkina Faso | Bangladesh | Dominican Republic | Bolivia |
| Ethiopia | Indonesia | El Salvador | Brazil |
| Ghana | Philippines | Guatemala | Colombia |
| Kenya | Sri Lanka | Haiti | Ecuador |
| Rwanda | Thailand | Honduras | Peru |
| Tanzania | Cambodia | Mexico | |
| Togo | Myanmar | Nicaragua | |
| Uganda | | | |
| Malawi | | | |
| Zambia | | | |
