= 2013 AAA 400 =

Race details
- Race 29 of 36 in the 2013 NASCAR Sprint Cup Series
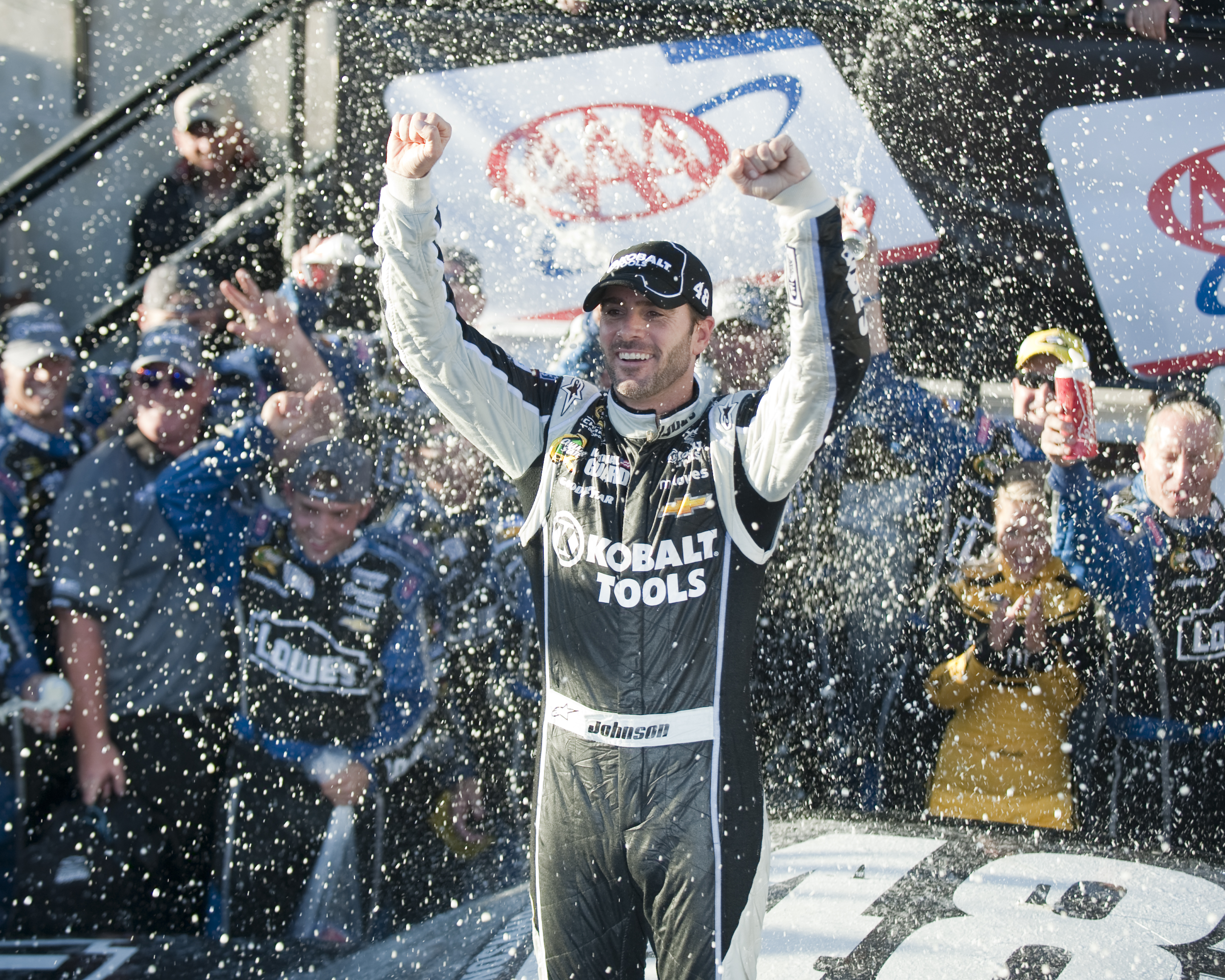
- Jimmie Johnson won the race
- Date: September 29, 2013
- Location: Dover International Speedway in Dover, Delaware
- Course: Permanent racing facility
- Course length: 1 miles (1.6 km)
- Distance: 400 laps, 400 mi (643.737 km)
- Weather: Partly cloudy with a high of 71 °F (22 °C), NE winds up to 12 miles per hour (19 km/h)

Pole position
Driver	Dale Earnhardt Jr.	Hendrick Motorsports
- Time: 22.243 seconds

Most laps led
Driver	Jimmie Johnson	Hendrick Motorsports
- Laps: 243

Winner
No. 48	Jimmie Johnson	Hendrick Motorsports

Television in the United States
- Network: ESPN
- Announcers: Allen Bestwick, Dale Jarrett and Andy Petree

The 2013 AAA 400 was a NASCAR Sprint Cup Series race held on September 29, 2013, at Dover International Speedway in Dover, Delaware, United States. Contested over 400 laps on the 1–mile (1.6 km) oval, it was the 29th race of the 2013 Sprint Cup Series championship, and the third race in the Chase for the Sprint Cup. Jimmie Johnson of Hendrick Motorsports won the race, his fifth win of the season and record eighth win at Dover, while Dale Earnhardt Jr. finished second. Joey Logano, Jeff Gordon, and Kyle Busch rounded out the top five.

== Report ==
=== Background ===
Dover International Speedway is a four-turn short track oval that is 1 mile (1.6 km) long. The track's turns are banked at twenty-four degrees. The front stretch, the location of the finish line, is banked at nine degrees with the backstretch. The racetrack has seats for 113,000 spectators. Brad Keselowski was the defending race winner after winning the event in the 2012 race.

Before the race, Matt Kenseth was leading the Drivers' Championship with 2,111 points, while Kyle Busch stood in second with 2,097 points. Jimmie Johnson followed in third with 2,093, 18 ahead of Carl Edwards in fourth, and 20 ahead of Greg Biffle in fifth. Kevin Harvick, with 2,072, was in sixth; one ahead of Kurt Busch, who was scored seventh. Eighth-placed Jeff Gordon was five points ahead of Ryan Newman and six ahead of Clint Bowyer in ninth and tenth. Dale Earnhardt Jr. was eleventh with 2,049, seven points ahead of Joey Logano in twelfth. Kasey Kahne completed the first thirteen positions with 2,040 points. In the Manufacturers' Championship, Toyota and Chevrolet were tied for the lead with 188 points. Ford was third with 149 points before the race.

=== Entry list ===
(R) - Denotes rookie driver.

(i) - Denotes driver who is ineligible for series driver points.

No.	Driver	Team	Manufacturer
1	Jamie McMurray	Earnhardt Ganassi Racing	Chevrolet
2	Brad Keselowski	Penske Racing	Ford
5	Kasey Kahne	Hendrick Motorsports	Chevrolet
7	Dave Blaney	Tommy Baldwin Racing	Chevrolet
9	Marcos Ambrose	Richard Petty Motorsports	Ford
10	Danica Patrick (R)	Stewart–Haas Racing	Chevrolet
11	Denny Hamlin	Joe Gibbs Racing	Toyota
13	Casey Mears	Germain Racing	Ford
14	Mark Martin	Stewart–Haas Racing	Chevrolet
15	Clint Bowyer	Michael Waltrip Racing	Toyota
16	Greg Biffle	Roush Fenway Racing	Ford
17	Ricky Stenhouse Jr. (R)	Roush Fenway Racing	Ford
18	Kyle Busch	Joe Gibbs Racing	Toyota
20	Matt Kenseth	Joe Gibbs Racing	Toyota
22	Joey Logano	Penske Racing	Ford
24	Jeff Gordon	Hendrick Motorsports	Chevrolet
27	Paul Menard	Richard Childress Racing	Chevrolet
29	Kevin Harvick	Richard Childress Racing	Chevrolet
30	Cole Whitt (i)	Swan Racing	Toyota
31	Jeff Burton	Richard Childress Racing	Chevrolet
32	Timmy Hill (R)	FAS Lane Racing	Ford
33	Landon Cassill (i)	Circle Sport	Chevrolet
34	David Ragan	Front Row Motorsports	Ford
35	Josh Wise (i)	Front Row Motorsports	Ford
36	J. J. Yeley	Tommy Baldwin Racing	Chevrolet
38	David Gilliland	Front Row Motorsports	Ford
39	Ryan Newman	Stewart–Haas Racing	Chevrolet
40	Tony Raines (i)	Circle Sport	Chevrolet
42	Juan Pablo Montoya	Earnhardt Ganassi Racing	Chevrolet
43	Aric Almirola	Richard Petty Motorsports	Ford
47	A. J. Allmendinger	JTG Daugherty Racing	Toyota
48	Jimmie Johnson	Hendrick Motorsports	Chevrolet
51	Ryan Truex (i)	HScott Motorsports	Chevrolet
55	Brian Vickers (i)	Michael Waltrip Racing	Toyota
56	Martin Truex Jr.	Michael Waltrip Racing	Toyota
78	Kurt Busch	Furniture Row Racing	Chevrolet
83	David Reutimann	BK Racing	Toyota
87	Joe Nemechek (i)	NEMCO-Jay Robinson Racing	Toyota
88	Dale Earnhardt Jr.	Hendrick Motorsports	Chevrolet
93	Travis Kvapil	BK Racing	Toyota
95	Reed Sorenson (i)	Leavine Family Racing	Ford
98	Michael McDowell	Phil Parsons Racing	Ford
99	Carl Edwards	Roush Fenway Racing	Ford
Official entry list

=== Practice and qualifying ===
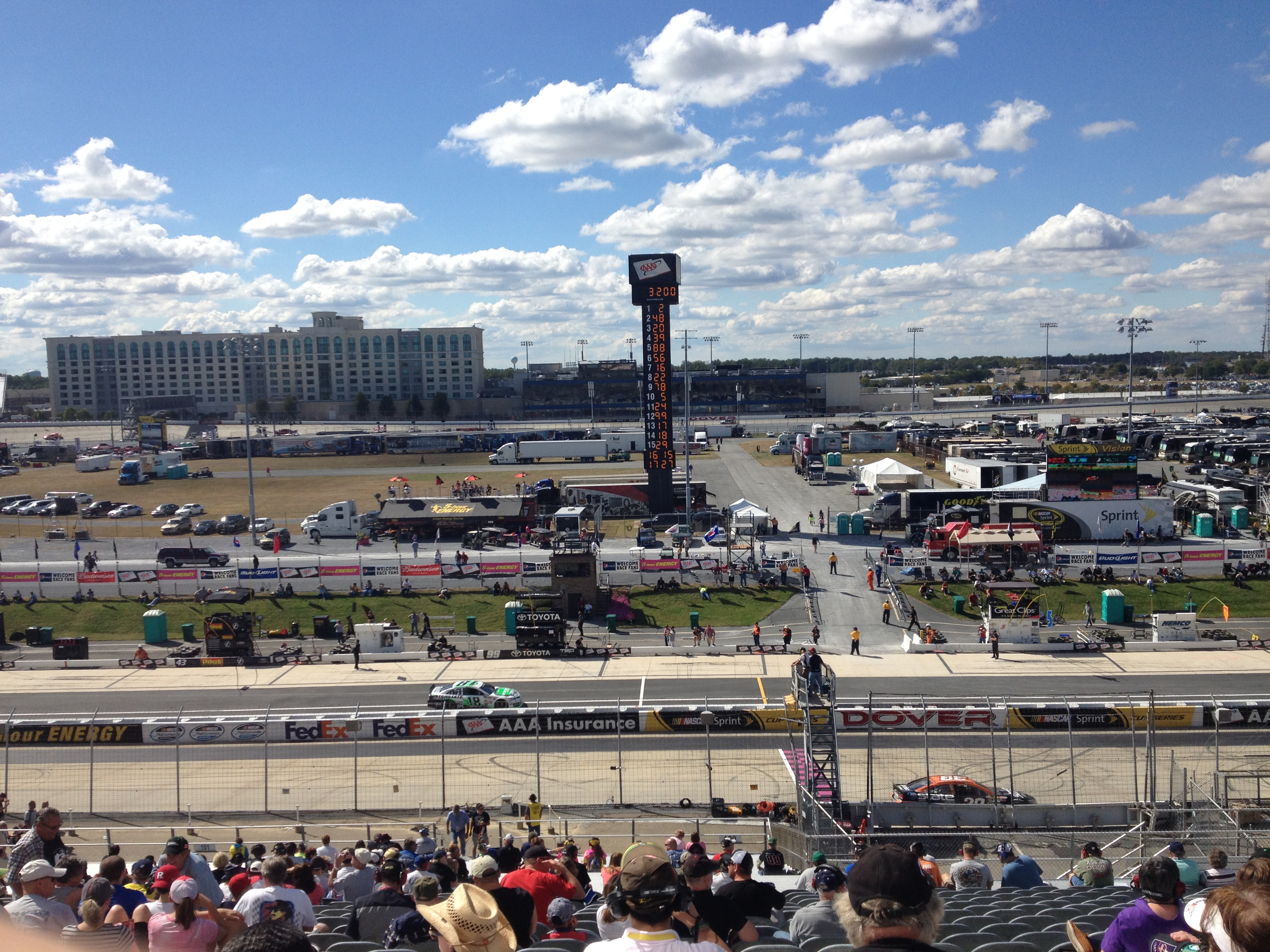
Final practice

Three practice sessions were held before the race. The first session, held on September 27, 2013, was 90 minutes long. The second and third, held a day later on September 28, 2013, were 55 and 50 minutes long. During the first practice session, Kenseth was quickest with a time of 22.556, ahead of Martin Truex Jr. and Logano in second and third. Kurt Busch followed in the fourth position, ahead of Kyle Busch in fifth.

During qualifying, forty-three cars were entered. Earnhardt Jr. clinched his second pole position of the season, with a lap time of 22.243 seconds, setting a new track record. He was joined on the front row of the grid by Kenseth. Newman qualified third, Edwards took fourth, and Aric Almirola started fifth. Keselowski, Jamie McMurray, Johnson, Kurt Busch, and Truex Jr. completed the first ten positions on the grid.

In the Saturday morning session, Kahne was quickest, ahead of Earnhardt Jr. and Gordon in second and third. Kurt Busch and Kenseth followed in the fourth and fifth positions. Johnson, Kyle Busch, Bowyer, Juan Pablo Montoya, and Truex Jr. rounded out ten quickest drivers in the session. In the final practice session for the race, Keselowski was quickest with a time of 23.027 seconds. Johnson followed in second, ahead of Kenseth and Newman in third and fourth. Earnhardt Jr. managed fifth in the session.

=== Race ===
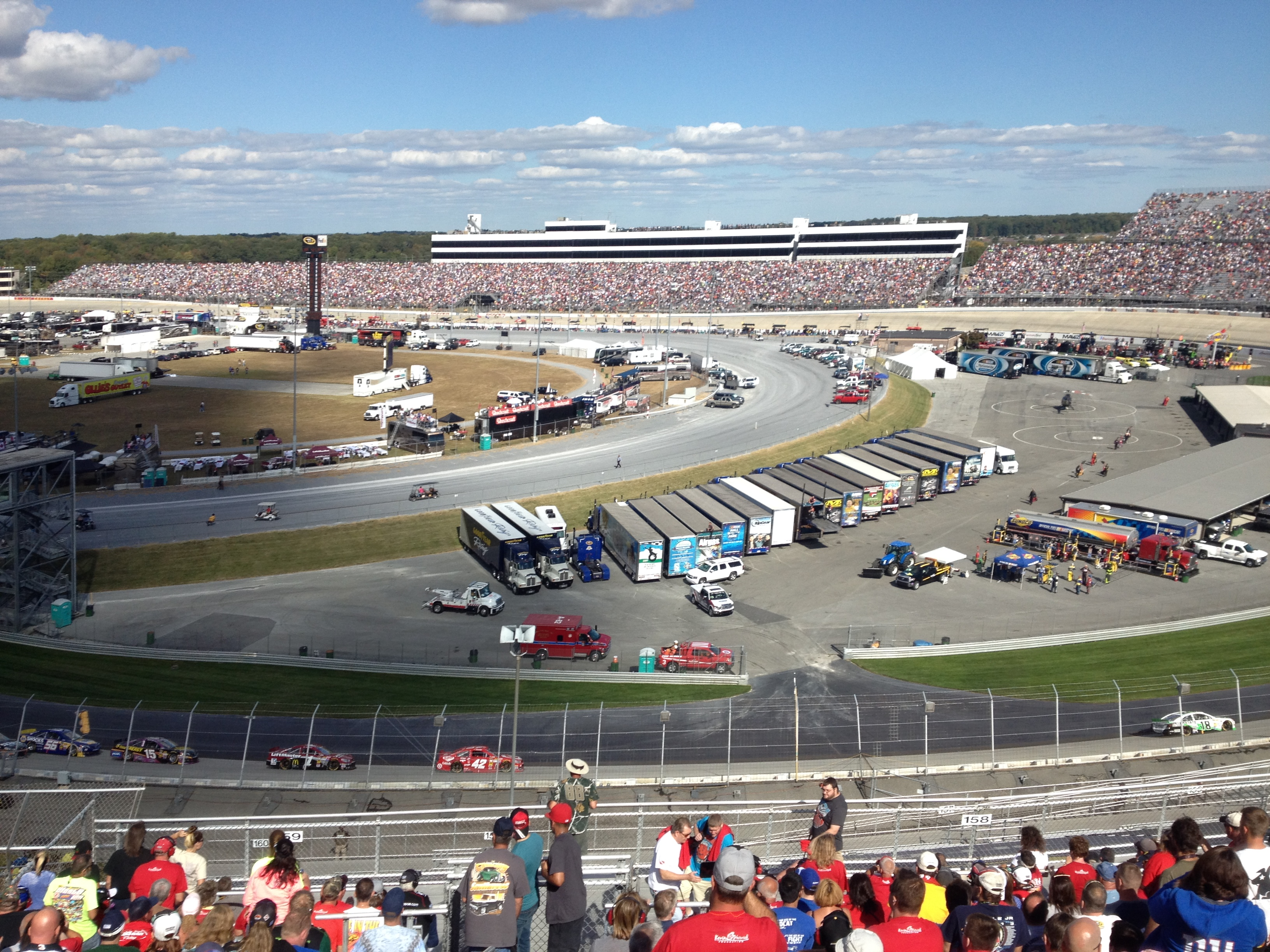
Kyle Busch leads the pack through turn 3 following the first caution due to debris

Following the green flag, Earnhardt Jr. gained a large lead over the rest of the pack. His lead narrowed as he caught up to the slower cars toward the back of the pack. Kenseth took the lead from Earnhardt Jr. on lap 26. Earnhardt Jr. regained the lead on lap 31 as Kenseth struggled to get around slower cars. The first caution of the race occurred for debris in turn 3 on lap 38. During this caution, Kyle Busch took over the race lead after the leaders made pit stops. Kyle Busch continued to lead the race following the restart, gaining a large lead over the rest of the field. Kyle Busch's lead eventually shrunk and on lap 71, Newman passed him for the lead. Earnhardt Jr. took back the race lead on lap 76. During a round of green-flag pit stops, Earnhardt Jr. missed the commitment line attempting to make his stop and was forced to do another lap before pitting. This cost him the race lead, which was taken over by Johnson on lap 120. Johnson continued to lead the race after the round of pit stops. Kurt Busch was forced to make an unscheduled pit stop because of a loose rear wheel. The second caution of the race came out on lap 166 due to debris in turn 1. The leaders came to pit road under this caution and Kenseth won the battle off pit road. Kenseth maintained the race lead following this caution. Kenseth led for multiple laps until he was held up by slower traffic. Johnson regained the lead from Kenseth on lap 198.

Johnson held the lead heading into the second half of the race. Keselowski had to come to pit road after fluid was coming from his car. On lap 229, the third caution was brought out from the fluid dropped by Keselowski. Johnson maintained the lead following this caution. He continued to lead following a cycle of green-flag pit stops. At this point, the lead lap cars did not have enough fuel to make it to the finish except for Bowyer. On lap 371, the fourth and final caution of the race occurred for debris in turn 3. During this caution, the leaders came to pit road, with Johnson winning the battle off pit road by taking two tires ahead of Earnhardt Jr. who took four tires. Johnson maintained the lead after the restart and continued on to win the race. This was Johnson's fifth win in 2013 and eighth career win at Dover, setting the track record for most wins by breaking a tie with Richard Petty and Bobby Allison.

== Results ==
=== Qualifying ===
Grid	No.	Driver	Team	Manufacturer	Time	Speed
1	88	Dale Earnhardt Jr.	Hendrick Motorsports	Chevrolet	22.243	161.849
2	20	Matt Kenseth	Joe Gibbs Racing	Toyota	22.249	161.805
3	39	Ryan Newman	Stewart–Haas Racing	Chevrolet	22.258	161.740
4	99	Carl Edwards	Roush Fenway Racing	Ford	22.276	161.609
5	43	Aric Almirola	Richard Petty Motorsports	Ford	22.276	161.609
6	2	Brad Keselowski	Penske Racing	Ford	22.278	161.594
7	1	Jamie McMurray	Earnhardt Ganassi Racing	Chevrolet	22.292	161.493
8	48	Jimmie Johnson	Hendrick Motorsports	Chevrolet	22.313	161.341
9	78	Kurt Busch	Furniture Row Racing	Chevrolet	22.315	161.326
10	56	Martin Truex Jr.	Michael Waltrip Racing	Toyota	22.332	161.204
11	22	Joey Logano	Penske Racing	Ford	22.357	161.023
12	29	Kevin Harvick	Richard Childress Racing	Chevrolet	22.388	160.800
13	42	Juan Pablo Montoya	Earnhardt Ganassi Racing	Chevrolet	22.397	160.736
14	18	Kyle Busch	Joe Gibbs Racing	Toyota	22.399	160.721
15	17	Ricky Stenhouse Jr. (R)	Roush Fenway Racing	Ford	22.400	160.714
16	24	Jeff Gordon	Hendrick Motorsports	Chevrolet	22.407	160.664
17	47	A. J. Allmendinger	JTG Daugherty Racing	Toyota	22.409	160.650
18	11	Denny Hamlin	Joe Gibbs Racing	Toyota	22.422	160.557
19	16	Greg Biffle	Roush Fenway Racing	Ford	22.424	160.542
20	5	Kasey Kahne	Hendrick Motorsports	Chevrolet	22.448	160.371
21	27	Paul Menard	Richard Childress Racing	Chevrolet	22.465	160.249
22	55	Brian Vickers	Michael Waltrip Racing	Toyota	22.486	160.100
23	15	Clint Bowyer	Michael Waltrip Racing	Toyota	22.521	159.851
24	9	Marcos Ambrose	Richard Petty Motorsports	Ford	22.550	159.645
25	31	Jeff Burton	Richard Childress Racing	Chevrolet	22.673	158.779
26	13	Casey Mears	Germain Racing	Ford	22.697	158.611
27	34	David Ragan	Front Row Motorsports	Ford	22.720	158.451
28	38	David Gilliland	Front Row Motorsports	Ford	22.747	158.263
29	14	Mark Martin	Stewart–Haas Racing	Chevrolet	22.786	157.992
30	93	Travis Kvapil	BK Racing	Toyota	22.795	157.929
31	10	Danica Patrick (R)	Stewart–Haas Racing	Chevrolet	22.848	157.563
32	36	J. J. Yeley	Tommy Baldwin Racing	Chevrolet	22.850	157.549
33	30	Cole Whitt	Swan Racing Company	Toyota	22.881	157.336
34	98	Michael McDowell	Phil Parsons Racing	Ford	22.947	156.883
35	95	Reed Sorenson	Leavine Family Racing	Ford	22.975	156.692
36	51	Ryan Truex	Phoenix Racing	Chevrolet	22.982	156.644
37	33	Landon Cassill	Circle Sport	Chevrolet	23.004	156.495
38	35	Josh Wise	Front Row Motorsports	Ford	23.047	156.203
39	83	David Reutimann	BK Racing	Toyota	23.137	155.595
40	7	Dave Blaney	Tommy Baldwin Racing	Chevrolet	23.151	155.501
41	87	Joe Nemechek	NEMCO-Jay Robinson Racing	Toyota	23.251	154.832
42	32	Timmy Hill (R)	FAS Lane Racing	Ford	23.297	154.526
43	40	Tony Raines	Circle Sport	Chevrolet	23.445	153.551
(R) Rookie of the Year candidate Source:

=== Race results ===
Pos	Car	Driver	Team	Manufacturer	Laps	Led	Points^{1}
1	48	Jimmie Johnson	Hendrick Motorsports	Chevrolet	400	243	48
2	88	Dale Earnhardt Jr.	Hendrick Motorsports	Chevrolet	400	80	43
3	22	Joey Logano	Penske Racing	Ford	400	0	41
4	24	Jeff Gordon	Hendrick Motorsports	Chevrolet	400	3	41
5	18	Kyle Busch	Joe Gibbs Racing	Toyota	400	30	40
6	29	Kevin Harvick	Richard Childress Racing	Chevrolet	400	0	38
7	20	Matt Kenseth	Joe Gibbs Racing	Toyota	400	36	38
8	39	Ryan Newman	Stewart–Haas Racing	Chevrolet	400	6	37
9	16	Greg Biffle	Roush Fenway Racing	Ford	400	0	35
10	15	Clint Bowyer	Michael Waltrip Racing	Toyota	400	1	35
11	1	Jamie McMurray	Earnhardt Ganassi Racing	Chevrolet	400	0	33
12	55	Brian Vickers	Michael Waltrip Racing	Toyota	400	0	0
13	5	Kasey Kahne	Hendrick Motorsports	Chevrolet	399	0	31
14	31	Jeff Burton	Richard Childress Racing	Chevrolet	399	0	30
15	56	Martin Truex Jr.	Michael Waltrip Racing	Toyota	399	0	29
16	9	Marcos Ambrose	Richard Petty Motorsports	Ford	398	0	28
17	17	Ricky Stenhouse Jr. (R)	Roush Fenway Racing	Ford	398	0	27
18	27	Paul Menard	Richard Childress Racing	Chevrolet	398	0	26
19	14	Mark Martin	Stewart–Haas Racing	Chevrolet	397	0	25
20	11	Denny Hamlin	Joe Gibbs Racing	Toyota	397	0	24
21	78	Kurt Busch	Furniture Row Racing	Chevrolet	397	0	23
22	43	Aric Almirola	Richard Petty Motorsports	Ford	397	0	22
23	42	Juan Pablo Montoya	Earnhardt Ganassi Racing	Chevrolet	397	0	21
24	13	Casey Mears	Germain Racing	Ford	395	0	20
25	34	David Ragan	Front Row Motorsports	Ford	395	0	19
26	47	A. J. Allmendinger	JTG Daugherty Racing	Toyota	395	0	18
27	30	Cole Whitt	Swan Racing Company	Toyota	394	0	0
28	83	David Reutimann	BK Racing	Toyota	394	0	16
29	10	Danica Patrick (R)	Stewart–Haas Racing	Chevrolet	394	0	15
30	38	David Gilliland	Front Row Motorsports	Ford	393	1	15
31	93	Travis Kvapil	BK Racing	Toyota	392	0	13
32	51	Ryan Truex	Phoenix Racing	Chevrolet	392	0	0
33	7	Dave Blaney	Tommy Baldwin Racing	Chevrolet	391	0	11
34	36	J. J. Yeley	Tommy Baldwin Racing	Chevrolet	390	0	10
35	99	Carl Edwards	Roush Fenway Racing	Ford	385	0	9
36	32	Timmy Hill (R)	FAS Lane Racing	Ford	381	0	8
37	2	Brad Keselowski	Penske Racing	Ford	355	0	7
38	33	Landon Cassill	Circle Sport	Chevrolet	275	0	0
39	87	Joe Nemechek	NEMCO-Jay Robinson Racing	Toyota	168	0	0
40	40	Tony Raines	Circle Sport	Chevrolet	154	0	0
41	95	Reed Sorenson	Leavine Family Racing	Ford	139	0	0
42	35	Josh Wise	Front Row Motorsports	Ford	128	0	0
43	98	Michael McDowell	Phil Parsons Racing	Ford	107	0	1
(R) Rookie of the Year candidate Source:^1 Points include 3 Chase for the Sprint Cup points for winning, 1 point for leading a lap, and 1 point for most laps led.

== Standings after the race ==
Drivers' Championship standings

	Pos	Driver	Points
	1	Matt Kenseth	2149
1	2	Jimmie Johnson	2141 (-8)
1	3	Kyle Busch	2137 (-12)
2	4	Kevin Harvick	2110 (-39)
3	5	Jeff Gordon	2110 (-39)
1	6	Greg Biffle	2108 (-41)
2	7	Ryan Newman	2101 (-48)
2	8	Clint Bowyer	2098 (-51)
2	9	Kurt Busch	2094 (-55)
1	10	Dale Earnhardt Jr.	2092 (-57)
7	11	Carl Edwards	2084 (-65)
	12	Joey Logano	2083 (-66)
	13	Kasey Kahne	2071 (-78)

Manufacturers' Championship standings

	Pos	Manufacturer	Points
1	1	Chevrolet	197
1	2	Toyota	192 (-5)
	3	Ford	155 (-42)

- Note: Only the first thirteen positions are included for the driver standings.

Previous race: 2013 Sylvania 300	Sprint Cup Series; 2013 season	Next race: 2013 Hollywood Casino 400
