= Kevin Swindell =

American racing driver (born 1989)

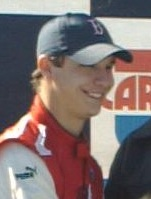
- Swindell in 2008
- Born: February 21, 1989 (age 37); Germantown, Tennessee, U.S.
- Achievements: 2010, 2011, 2012, 2013 Chili Bowl Nationals Winner; 2009 Knoxville Midget Nationals Winner; 2002 World Karting Association Grand National Champion

NASCAR Cup Series career
- 1 race run over 1 year
- 2013 position: 73rd
- Best finish: 73rd (2013)
- First race: 2013 Sylvania 300 (Loudon)
Wins	Top tens	Poles
0	0	0

NASCAR O'Reilly Auto Parts Series career
- 29 races run over 5 years
- 2014 position: 32nd
- Best finish: 26th (2013)
- First race: 2010 New England 200 (Loudon)
- Last race: 2014 O'Reilly Auto Parts Challenge (Texas)
Wins	Top tens	Poles
0	3	0
- Statistics up to date as of May 11, 2023.

Kevin Swindell (born February 21, 1989) is an American former racing driver and entrepreneur, who has competed in USAC and NASCAR competition. He has won 77 races in various dirt racing series including the Chili Bowl Nationals. Swindell is the son of three time World of Outlaws Sprint Car champion Sammy Swindell. Swindell owns and operates Swindell Speedlab, a clothing brand as well as Victory Fuel, a brand of flavored water.

== Racing career ==
=== Early career ===
Swindell began his racing career at age 5 in go-karts in Memphis, Tennessee, finishing an impressive fourth in his Junior Novice kart series debut in 1995. He moved up to Jr. I after winning four races in six starts. He had the same result in 1997 there, four wins in six starts. In 1998, he won a thirty-lap Iron Man race at Memphis and won four of five races in Jr. I karting in 2000. Swindell was the 2001 Jr. II kart champion in indoor karting and won the first champ kart race ever held on dirt. He even won the first ever champ kart race ran on pavement in 2002 and won the World Karting Association Grand National Championship title as well as winning his second consecutive Tulsa Shootout Jr. II championship.

=== Dirt career ===
Swindell made his impressive debut in dirt racing in 1999 when he won four quarter midget national victories. He won two more races in the Tulsa Quarter Midget series in 2000. He then leaped into the USAC and World of Outlaws world in 2002, the same series where his father, Sammy Swindell, made a name for himself. There, he got back-to-back victories in both series in the 600 Mini-Sprints at Granite City, Illinois, in 2003, showing that he was going to make a name for himself as well. In 2004, he won two World of Outlaws sprint car races as a crew chief to his father Sammy. He made World of Outlaws history in 2005 when he became the youngest driver to ever finish in the top-ten in a feature event at the age of fifteen, finishing sixth at Parramatta. He even set two new track qualifying records in the USCS series as well and finish twentieth in his first season in WoO Sprint Cars.

In 2006, Swindell won his first career WoO feature event at The Charlotte Motor Speedway Dirt Track (Formerly known as the Lowe's Dirt Track), becoming the youngest winner in World of Outlaws history at the age of seventeen. In 2007, Swindell teamed with NASCAR driver Kasey Kahne to run the full USAC midget and sprint car schedule and finished sixth and eighth in points in both series respectively. He was the Western World champion in the USAC series at Manzanita in 2008. In 2009, Swindell won the USAC Knoxville Nationals and the Louis Vermeil Classic and was the Australian National Midget Champion. In 2010, Swindell won his first Chili Bowl Nationals victory and became the youngest driver to ever do so. He won it again in 2011 and won the All-Star sprint 140 feature at Knoxville. He finished third in points and was crowned Rookie of the Year. In 2012, Swindell won his third consecutive Chili Bowl Nationals and was runner-up in the Knoxville 360 Nationals. Swindell made USAC history in January 2013 when he became the first driver to ever win four consecutive Chili Bowl Nationals.

=== Stock car career ===
In 2006, Swindell made his debut in stock car racing in the ARCA Racing Series event at Salem, finishing fourteenth. He ran three more races that year with a best of eleventh at Toledo. In 2008, Swindell made his NASCAR debut running two K&N Pro Series East races at Mansfield and Stafford Springs, finishing thirteenth and sixteenth in those events. In 2009, he ran three more races in the series with a best of third at Loudon, his first career NASCAR top-five finish. In 2010, Swindell ran the full schedule scoring two poles, one top-five and four top-tens and finishing seventh in the points. He also ran an ARCA race at Rockingham where he won the pole and led the most laps but finished second. He made his NASCAR Nationwide Series debut at New Hampshire driving for Baker Curb Racing, but start and parked and finished 42nd. Swindell also ran two more events that year but had DNF's in those as well.

In 2011, Swindell drove the No. 16 Ford for Roush Fenway Racing in the Nationwide race at Dover filling in for the ill Trevor Bayne at the time, qualified an impressive fifth and ran very well until being taken out nearly halfway in a controversial incident with Alex Kennedy; after an accident, Kennedy pulled across the racetrack while attempting to rejoin the field, leaving Swindell with nowhere to go and triggering a major accident; Swindell wound up finishing 31st. Swindell also ran one ARCA race at Daytona, starting and finishing 12th.

In 2012, Swindell ran 8 ARCA Racing Series events and won his first career ARCA victory at Chicagoland Speedway, leading every single lap from the pole. He finished a career best 22nd in points that season. He also ran two NASCAR Nationwide Series events with Biagi-DenBeste Racing late in the season, finishing ninth at Texas Motor Speedway, his first career top-ten finish, and finishing 21st in the season finale at Homestead-Miami Speedway. For 2013, he signed with Biagi-DenBeste Racing to run 15 races in the Nationwide Series, competing for Rookie of the Year. In September, it was announced that Swindell would compete in the Sprint Cup Series for Swan Racing, at New Hampshire Motor Speedway; he finished 38th in the event.

On August 13, 2014, Venturini Motorsports announced that Swindell would replace the injured John Wes Townley in the No. 15 Toyota at the Springfield Mile's ARCA race; Swindell won the event, his second win in the series.

=== Other racing ===
Swindell has also raced in Australia, winning the 2008/09 Australian Speedcar Championship at the Murray Bridge Speedway (in Australia, Midgets are called Speedcars).

=== 2015 Knoxville Nationals accident ===
On August 13, 2015, Swindell was involved in a very serious accident in the early laps of a heat race during night two of the 55th annual Knoxville Nationals. His car flipped several times before landing on its wheels. He sustained a "significant injury" according to his father and former sprint car driver Sammy Swindell. It was later revealed that he had broken the L-1 and T-7 vertebrae in his back and was paralyzed from the waist down.

In October 2015, Swindell spoke with Robin Miller about the progress in his recovery, including having regained some feeling and movement in his legs.

== Motorsports career results ==
=== NASCAR ===
(key) (Bold – Pole position awarded by qualifying time. Italics – Pole position earned by points standings or practice time. * – Most laps led.)

==== Sprint Cup Series ====
NASCAR Sprint Cup Series results
Year	Team	No.	Make	1	2	3	4	5	6	7	8	9	10	11	12	13	14	15	16	17	18	19	20	21	22	23	24	25	26	27	28	29	30	31	32	33	34	35	36	NSCC	Pts	Ref
2013	Swan Racing Company	30	Toyota	DAY	PHO	LVS	BRI	CAL	MAR	TEX	KAN	RCH	TAL	DAR	CLT	DOV	POC	MCH	SON	KEN	DAY	NHA	IND	POC	GLN	MCH	BRI	ATL	RCH	CHI	NHA; 38	DOV	KAN	CLT	TAL	MAR	TEX	PHO	HOM	73rd	0^{1}	

==== Nationwide Series ====
NASCAR Nationwide Series results
Year	Team	No.	Make	1	2	3	4	5	6	7	8	9	10	11	12	13	14	15	16	17	18	19	20	21	22	23	24	25	26	27	28	29	30	31	32	33	34	35	NNSC	Pts	Ref
2010	Baker Curb Racing	37	Ford	DAY	CAL	LVS	BRI	NSH	PHO	TEX	TAL	RCH	DAR	DOV	CLT	NSH	KEN	ROA	NHA; 42	DAY	CHI	GTY; 39																	101st	107	
2010	Baker Curb Racing	43	Ford																				IRP; 33	IOW	GLN	MCH	BRI	CGV	ATL	RCH	DOV	KAN	CAL	CLT	GTY	TEX	PHO	HOM	101st	107	
2011	Roush Fenway Racing	16	Ford	DAY	PHO	LVS	BRI	CAL	TEX	TAL	NSH	RCH	DAR	DOV; 31	IOW	CLT	CHI	MCH	ROA	DAY	KEN	NHA	NSH	IRP	IOW	GLN	CGV	BRI	ATL	RCH	CHI	DOV	KAN	CLT	TEX	PHO	HOM		80th	13	
2012	Biagi-DenBeste Racing	98	Ford	DAY	PHO	LVS	BRI	CAL	TEX	RCH	TAL	DAR	IOW	CLT	DOV	MCH	ROA	KEN	DAY	NHA	CHI	IND	IOW	GLN	CGV	BRI	ATL	RCH	CHI	KEN	DOV	CLT	KAN	TEX; 9	PHO	HOM; 21			58th	59	
2013	Biagi-DenBeste Racing	98	Ford	DAY	PHO	LVS; DNQ	BRI	CAL; 10	TEX; 16	RCH; 18	TAL	DAR	CLT; 18	DOV	IOW; 28	MCH	ROA	KEN; 11	DAY; 26	NHA	CHI	IND; 8	IOW	GLN	MOH	BRI; 25	ATL	RCH	CHI; 16	KEN	DOV	KAN	CLT; 16	TEX; 16	PHO; 34	HOM; 35			26th	342	
2014	JGL Racing	93	Dodge	DAY	PHO	LVS	BRI	CAL	TEX	DAR	RCH	TAL	IOW	CLT	DOV	MCH	ROA	KEN	DAY	NHA	CHI	IND; 23	IOW; 29	GLN	MOH	BRI; 27	ATL; 36	RCH	CHI; 31	KEN; 22	DOV; 33	KAN; 37	CLT; 23	TEX; 22	PHO	HOM			32nd	157	

==== K&N Pro Series East ====
NASCAR K&N Pro Series East results
Year	Team	No.	Make	1	2	3	4	5	6	7	8	9	10	11	12	13	NKNPSEC	Pts	Ref
2008	Gillett Evernham Motorsports	9	Dodge	GRE	IOW	SBO	GLN	NHA	TMP	NSH	ADI	LRP	MFD; 13	NHA	DOV	STA; 16	42nd	239	
2009	Dave Davis Motorsports	9	Dodge	GRE	TRI	IOW	SBO	GLN	NHA; 3	TMP	ADI	LRP	NHA; 10	DOV; 22			28th	406	
2010	Dave Davis Motorsports	9	Chevy	GRE; 22	SBO; 26		MAR; 11		LRP; 11	LEE; 9	JFC; 14						7th	1305	
2010	Dave Davis Motorsports	9	Dodge			IOW; 7		NHA; 2				NHA; 11	DOV; 9				7th	1305	

=== ARCA Racing Series ===
(key) (Bold – Pole position awarded by qualifying time. Italics – Pole position earned by points standings or practice time. * – Most laps led. ** – All laps led.)

ARCA Racing Series results
Year	Team	No.	Make	1	2	3	4	5	6	7	8	9	10	11	12	13	14	15	16	17	18	19	20	21	22	23	ARSC	Pts
2006	Cunningham Motorsports	4	Dodge	DAY	NSH	SLM; 14	WIN; 21	KEN	TOL	POC	MCH	KAN	KEN	BLN	POC	GTW	NSH	MCH	ISF	MIL	TOL; 11	DSF	CHI	SLM; 25	TAL	IOW	62nd	565
2010	Eddie Sharp Racing	6	Toyota	DAY	PBE	SLM	TEX	TAL	TOL	POC	MCH	IOW	MFD	POC	BLN	NJE	ISF	CHI	DSF	TOL	SLM	KAN	**CAR**; 2				77th	240
2011	Eddie Sharp Racing	98	Toyota	DAY; 12	TAL	SLM	TOL	NJE	CHI	POC	MCH	WIN	BLN	IOW	IRP	POC	ISF	MAD	DSF	SLM	KAN	TOL					104th	170
2012	Venturini Motorsports	55	Toyota	DAY	MOB	SLM	TAL; 11	TOL	ELK	POC; 19	MCH; 14	WIN	NJE; 19	IOW	**CHI**; 1**				ISF; 3	MAD	SLM	DSF; C	KAN; 2				22nd	1545
2012	Venturini Motorsports	66	Toyota													IRP; 3	POC	BLN									22nd	1545
2014	Venturini Motorsports	15	Toyota	DAY	MOB	SLM	TAL	TOL	NJE	POC	MCH	ELK	WIN	CHI	IRP	POC	BLN	ISF	MAD	DSF; 1	SLM	KEN	KAN				70th	230

^{*} Season still in progress
^{1} Ineligible for series championship points
