= Tobacco Free Florida =

Florida anti-smoking organization

Tobacco Free Florida is an anti-smoking organization based in the U.S. state of Florida, administered by the Florida Department of Health. The campaign aims to promote quitting among tobacco users, reduce the number of new tobacco users, eliminate secondhand smoke exposure, and reduce tobacco related health problems.

== History ==
Since 1989, Florida's Department of Health and Rehabilitative Services has been actively preventing tobacco use.

In 1997, Florida settled a lawsuit with a large tobacco industry and was granted $11.3 billion to assist with Medicaid costs for smokers incurred by various health providers. As a result of the lawsuit, the Tobacco Pilot Program was launched by the Florida Department of Health to help educate youth on the harmful impacts of tobacco use. Florida legislation reduced funding to $1 million annually five years later after the Tobacco Pilot Program was launched, but Floridians passed a constitutional amendment in 2006 requiring an inflation-adjusted annual appropriation of 15% of the gross 2005 tobacco settlement fund to provide money for a statewide tobacco education and prevention program.

In 2007, the Zimmerman Agency was granted a $17.1 million contract to conduct a statewide social marketing, media, and public relations campaign. The Tobacco Free Florida brand was created as the department's health communication intervention component. It has reportedly helped 234,000 people quit smoking.

The organization operates on a budget of about $65 million per year.

== Super Bowl ads ==
In 2010, Tobacco Free Florida purchased a package of ads for $447,992.51 to be run multiple times before, during, and after the Super Bowl. The ads were created with a smoking cessation message targeting adult smokers. A focus group was run on people who had seen the commercials, concluding that people were indifferent about an increased risk of dying from cancer or heart disease, but showed concern upon realizing that every year smoking leaves 31,000 children fatherless.

The overall purpose of the advertisement campaign was to target adult smokers to think about how their tobacco use is affecting their children and family.
