= Compassion International =

American humanitarian aid NGO, founded 1952

- Founded: 1952
- Founder: Everett Swanson
- Type: Christian child sponsorship non-profit organization
- Tax ID no.: 36-2423707
- Location: Colorado Springs, Colorado
- Region served: 27 countries across four continents
- Key people: Santiago "Jimmy" Mellado (president and CEO)
- Revenue: US$ 1,001,200,000 (2020)
- Expenses: Program Services: US$ 813,929,000 (2020) Support Activities: US$ 185,251,000 (2020) Total: US$ 999,180,000 (2020)
- Website: www.compassion.com

Compassion International is an American child sponsorship and Christian humanitarian aid organization headquartered in Colorado Springs, Colorado, that aims to positively influence the long-term development of children globally who live in poverty.

A 2013 independent research report, in the Journal of Political Economy, concluded that as of that time, Compassion International had large and statistically significant impacts on participants' years of school completion, the probability of later employment, and the quality of that employment, in part as a consequence of improved self-esteem and expectations in participating children.

== History ==
The Everett Swanson Evangelistic Association was founded in 1952 by the Rev. Everett Swanson (member of Converge) to help children orphaned by war in South Korea. Swanson had traveled there to preach the gospel to the US Army troops, but during his visit he was deeply moved by the plight of the scores of abandoned children he saw. In 1953, he began to raise funds, and the next year he developed sponsorship programs to help support orphans for a few dollars a month. The name of the association changed to Compassion, Inc., in 1963, inspired by Jesus' words "I have compassion on the multitude. I will not send them away hungry" (Matthew 15.32). In 2022, it would be present in 27 countries. For example, see Compassion Suisse and Compassion Espagna.

== Leadership ==
As of November 2019, the board chair of the organization was Judy Golz, and the president and CEO was Santiago Mellado. In 2019, Mellado's annual compensation was $419,184 according to the organization's IRS filings.

== Programs ==
Compassion helps those in impoverished areas, using a holistic approach to child development. This approach goes well beyond simply providing food and medical aid, involving education and training to prepare the individuals for contributing back to their communities.

The organization also helps in emergency situations and in the funding of health centers.

=== Child sponsorship ===
Children in the child sponsorship program are provided food and clean water, medical care, education, life-skills training, and spiritual guidance through a direct sponsorship. Sponsored children are selected by the sponsors from lists provided by the ministry, and two-way communication is encouraged between the sponsored child and the sponsor. As of November 2023 the cost to sponsor a child through Compassion was US$43 (£32) per month, and globally there were over two million babies, children, and young adults in its programs.

Sponsors are able to visit their sponsored children through trips planned by Compassion International. Compassion's goal is to provide a trip to each country every other year. Compassion coordinates every aspect of the trip, including travel, meals, tips and gratuities, fees related to the travel, and sightseeing fares.

== Evaluations ==
Compassion International is a charter member of the Evangelical Council for Financial Accountability.

As of February 2025, it met the "20 Standards for Charity Accountability" from the Better Business Bureau's Wise Giving Alliance.

As of August 2025, it held a grade of "A" from CharityWatch.

In 2024, Compassion was ranked the 12th-largest charity organization in the US by Forbes magazine, with $1.3 Billion in private donations received. By the end of 2025, Forbes listed it as the 11th largest charity in the USA, with 95% of its income coming from private donations.

=== Previous reports ===
In 2013, a primary research report in the Journal of Political Economy provided evidence in support of the conclusion that child sponsorship via Compassion International resulted in significant positive outcomes for the children in the study set. The research, by Bruce Wydick, Paul Glewwe, and Laine Rutledge, evaluated Compassion efforts in six countries, with 10,144 children studied, reporting "large, statistically significant impacts on years of schooling; primary, secondary, and tertiary school completion; and the probability and quality of employment." They went on to note that the evidence, while early, "suggest[ed] that these impacts are due, in part, to increases in children’s aspirations."

Through 2015, Compassion International had received Charity Navigator's highest rating for 15 consecutive years, thereby receiving special recognition on their "10 Charities with the Most Consecutive 4-Star Ratings" list. However, Charity Navigator changed its rating system in 2016, and Compassion International's 2016 overall rating dropped to three stars out of four, for its accountability and transparency. In early 2026, the charity was ‘Not Rated’ by Charity Navigator.

=== Shutdown in India ===
Compassion operated in India for 48 years, with $45 million in transfers annually, making it India's largest single foreign donor. Compassion provided services under its Child Sponsor Program to 145,000 Indian children. In 2015, Compassion affiliates' offices were raided by tax investigators seeking evidence on whether it was funding religious conversions. Compassion said that attempts were made to force the ministry to divert funding to non-Christian Rashtriya Swayamsevak Sangh groups. Compassion refused to do so as it would be a misuse of funds entrusted to them by donors around the world. After talks back and forth, in 2017 the BJP-led Indian government barred Compassion from transferring funds into India, forcing the group to close its operations there. The Ministry of External Affairs later stated that the ban had nothing to do with the ideology of Compassion International.

=== Lack of financial transparency ===
Since 2019, Compassion stopped releasing a public Form 990 after reclassifying itself as a religious organization, or "an association of churches." Reclassification has been noted by several Christian ministry watchdogs as a growing trend among large Christian ministries. As a result, Compassion's Donor Confidence Score fell from 97 to 73 on MinistryWatch, and the organization is no longer rated on Charity Navigator due to the lack of Accountability & Finance beacon.

=== Unsuccessful domain name dispute ===
On 23 June 2025, Compassion International filed a complaint with CEPANI, demanding that the domain name compassion.be be transferred to them from the domain name holder – a humanitarian and human rights advocate – who had registered the domain in 2007 and directed it to the homepage of the Dalai Lama, the spiritual leader of the Gelug school of Tibetan Buddhism and a globally recognized symbol of peace, compassion, and Tibetan culture. On 28 August 2025, the third-party decider for CEPANI rejected Compassion International's argument and dismissed its complaint. The full decision is available through CEPANI.
