= Matt Crafton =

American racing driver (born 1976)

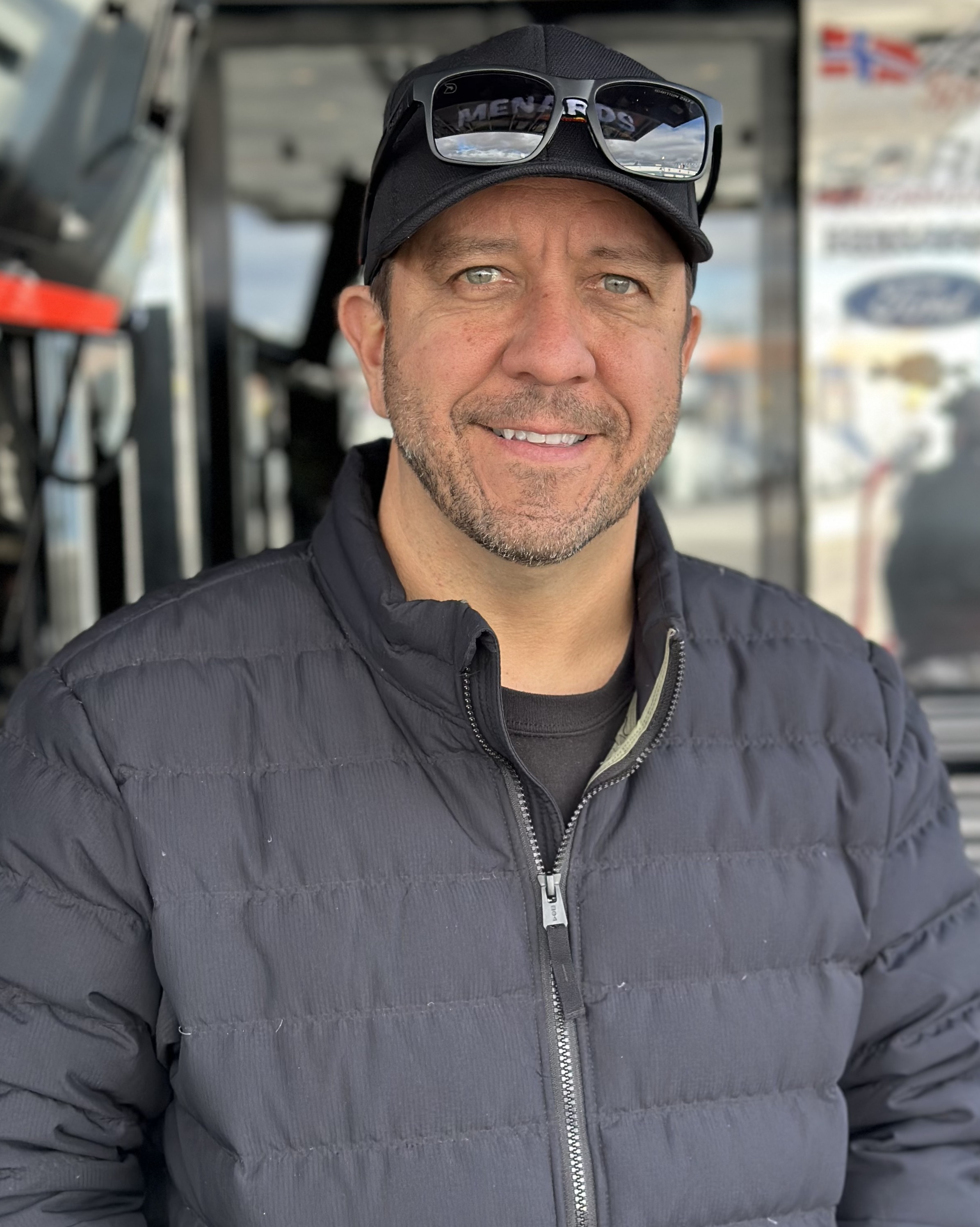
- Crafton at Las Vegas Motor Speedway in 2025
- Born: Matthew Justin Crafton; June 11, 1976 (age 50); Tulare, California, U.S.
- Height: 5 ft 11 in (1.80 m)
- Weight: 160 lb (73 kg)
- Achievements: 2013, 2014, 2019 NASCAR Craftsman Truck Series Champion; 2000 NASCAR Featherlite Southwest Tour Champion; All-time NASCAR Craftsman Truck Series top tens leader All-time most starts in the NASCAR Craftsman Truck Series
- Awards: West Coast Stock Car Hall of Fame (2023)

NASCAR Cup Series career
- 3 races run over 3 years
- 2023 position: 64th
- Best finish: 53rd (2019)
- First race: 2015 Daytona 500 (Daytona)
- Last race: 2023 Food City Dirt Race (Bristol Dirt)
Wins	Top tens	Poles
0	0	0

NASCAR O'Reilly Auto Parts Series career
- 4 races run over 2 years
- 2014 position: 98th
- Best finish: 98th (2014)
- First race: 2013 Feed the Children 300 (Kentucky)
- Last race: 2014 Boyd Gaming 300 (Las Vegas)
Wins	Top tens	Poles
0	3	0

NASCAR FedEx Freight Truck Series career
- 593 races run over 27 years
- 2026 position: 80th
- Best finish: 1st (2013, 2014, 2019)
- First race: 2000 Motorola 200 (California)
- Last race: 2026 Craftsman 200 (Homestead)
- First win: 2008 North Carolina Education Lottery 200 (Charlotte)
- Last win: 2020 E.P.T. 200 (Kansas)
Wins	Top tens	Poles
15	333	16

ARCA Menards Series career
- 5 races run over 3 years
- Best finish: 55th (2010)
- First race: 2010 Menards 200 (Toledo)
- Last race: 2012 Messina Wildlife Animal Stopper 200 (IRP)
Wins	Top tens	Poles
0	2	1

ARCA Menards Series West career
- 1 race run over 1 year
- Best finish: 42nd (2000)
- First race: 2000 Home Depot 300 (Irwindale)
Wins	Top tens	Poles
0	1	0
- Statistics up to date as of November 6, 2026.

Matthew Justin Crafton (born June 11, 1976) is an American professional stock car racing driver. He last competed part-time in the NASCAR Craftsman Truck Series, driving the No. 66 Ford F-150 for ThorSport Racing.

A long-time veteran of the Truck Series, Crafton is a three-time champion, winning the championship in 2013, 2014, and 2019. He is regarded as one of the greatest drivers in Truck Series history. With the exception of 2004, Crafton has spent his entire truck series career driving for ThorSport Racing along with longtime sponsor Menards. He holds the record for most consecutive truck series starts with 592. Following the conclusion of the 2025 season, he stepped down from full-time competition, choosing to instead run a few select races a season going forward.

== Early career ==
Crafton was born in Tulare, California. Before turning to NASCAR racing in 2000, he raced go-karts, midgets, and mini sprints. Crafton began his go-kart career at the age of seven after receiving a kart as a present for graduating from kindergarten. He won multiple national and regional championships before moving to midgets at the age of fifteen, winning twenty main events.

He joined the Featherlite Southwest Series as a substitute for his injured father, Danny Crafton, in 1996, filling in as the driver of the No. 46 entry for the final three races of the season. Crafton took over the No. 46 full-time in 1997. His career went national when he became involved in the 1998 Winter Heat Series shown on ESPN at Tucson Raceway Park, during which he raced against other NASCAR drivers Greg Biffle, Kevin Harvick, Kurt Busch, and Ron Hornaday. After four full-time seasons in the Featherlite Southwest Series, Crafton won the championship in 2000 on the strength of four wins that year. His success in the Featherlite Southwest Series that season led to the invitation to make his NASCAR Craftsman Truck Series debut for SealMaster Racing.

== NASCAR career ==
=== Craftsman Truck Series ===
==== 2000–2003: First stint with ThorSport ====
Crafton made his Truck Series debut in 2000 at the season finale, held at California Speedway. Driving the PickupTruck.com Chevy for ThorSport Racing, he qualified seventeenth and finished ninth. In 2001, he piloted the No. 88 for ThorSport full-time with sponsorship from Fast Track Delivery Sealer and XE Sighting System. He had eleven top-tens and finished twelfth in the championship standings, third behind Ricky Hendrick and Travis Kvapil for Rookie of the Year. Menards first joined as an associate sponsor in 2002, and that season, he earned six top-tens and finished fifteenth in points. Crafton earned 11 top 10s before finishing 11th in points in 2003.

==== 2004: KHI ====
In 2004, Crafton signed on to drive the No. 6 GM Goodwrench Silverado owned by Kevin Harvick Incorporated. He posted a best finish of third place in two races, and with six top fives and 17 top 10s, he ended the season fifth in the final standings.

==== 2005–2009: Start of second stint with ThorSport ====
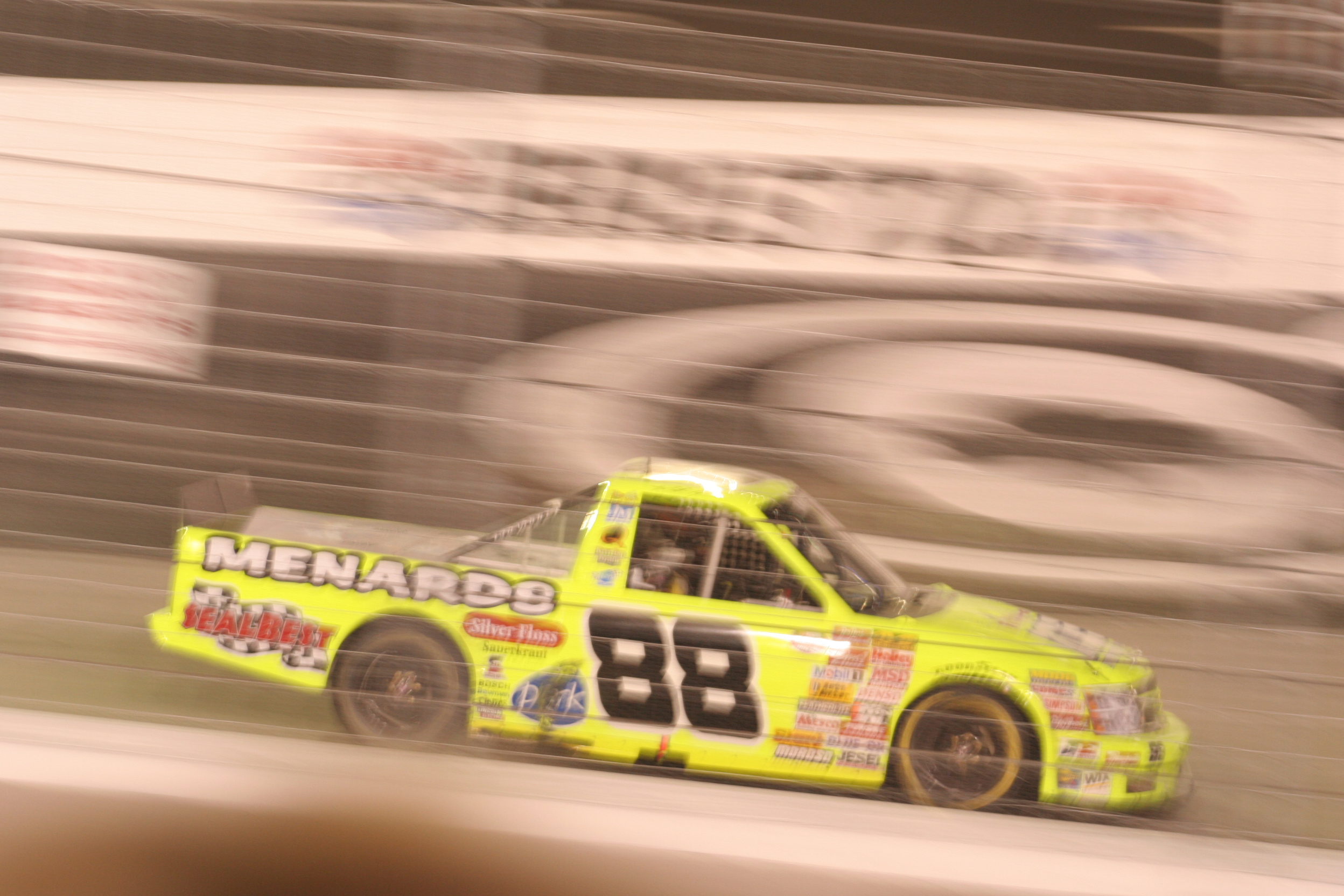
Crafton at Bristol Motor Speedway in 2007

Despite strong statistics in 2004, he was released from KHI and returned to ThorSport for the 2005 season, where he won his first career pole at New Hampshire International Speedway, earning two top-fives and ten top-tens and finishing ninth in the standings. In 2006, he had four top-five finishes, ten top-ten finishes, and finished fourteenth in points. In 2007, he improved to eighth in points and posted ten top-ten finishes for the third consecutive season.

Crafton's first NASCAR win came at Charlotte Motor Speedway on May 16, 2008, in the North Carolina Education Lottery 200. It was his 178th start, the record for most starts a driver has had before getting his first win in the Truck Series. The win moved him into the top five in points for 2008. Later that season, Crafton filled in for Robby Gordon in practice and qualified for the NASCAR Sprint Cup Series event at Homestead because Gordon was competing in the final off-road race of the season.

In 2009, although he did not win a race that season, Crafton scored two poles (Chicagoland Speedway and Texas Motor Speedway), 11 top-five and 21 top-10 finishes, ultimately finishing second in the point standings behind champion Ron Hornaday.

==== 2010's: Championship seasons ====
Crafton had another strong season in 2010, earning one pole at Texas Motor Speedway, 10 top-fives, and 20 top-10 finishes, resulting in a season-ending rank of fourth.

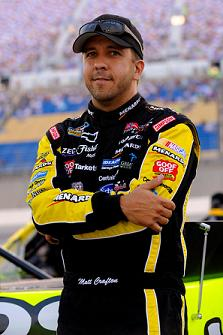
Crafton at Kentucky Speedway in 2011

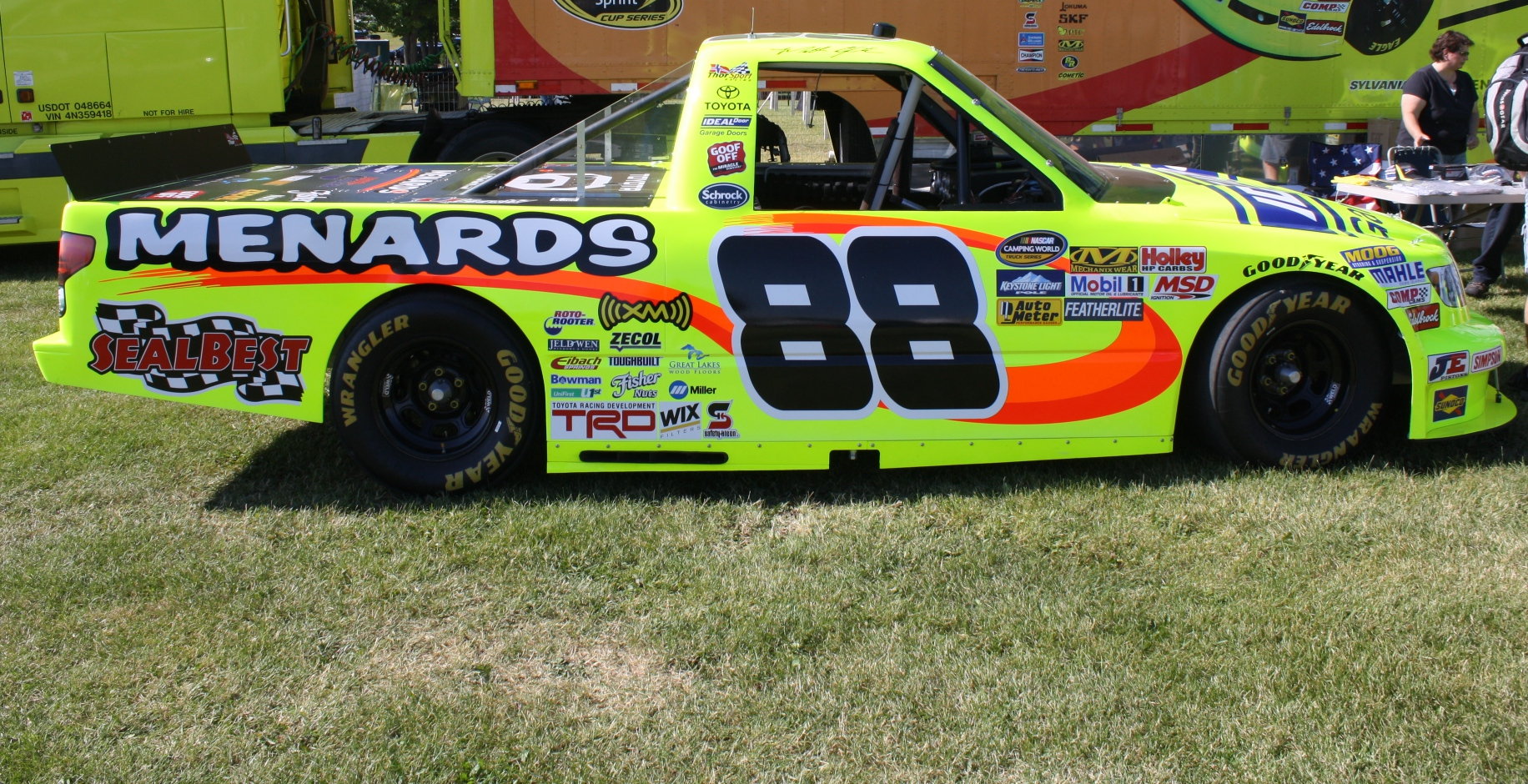
Crafton's 2012 truck

2011 saw the second win of Crafton's career at Iowa Speedway, in addition to poles at Michigan International Speedway and Martinsville Speedway, where he broke the track qualifying record. However, four DNFs (Did Not Finish) due to engine failures, mechanical issues and accidents caused by other competitors led to only five top fives and thirteen top-tens, ultimately relegating Crafton to eighth in the final standings. In 2012, after the team had moved from Chevrolet to Toyota, he had a decent season, finishing sixth in points.

2013 was Crafton's best season in his career to date. He won his third career race at Kansas in April. After this win, Crafton picked up the points lead and held it for the rest of the season. He finished in the top ten in the first sixteen races of the season, and nineteen overall, with a worst finish of 21st in the season finale at Homestead. He clinched his first Truck Series championship with his start in that race, and was able to stay on the lead lap despite late crash damage to become the first driver to complete every lap of the season in the Truck Series. He also made his Nationwide debut that year, running the No. 33 car for Richard Childress Racing, since the car was sponsored by Menards (which he drives in the Truck series). He ran both Kentucky races and Chicagoland in July. He performed well in all three races, finishing third at both Kentucky races and tenth at Chicagoland.

On March 30, 2014, Crafton scored his fourth career Truck win at Martinsville. On June 6, he won on fuel strategy at Texas Motor Speedway to win two races in a season for the first time in his career. It was also the first time he led more than one-hundred laps in a race. Despite crashing out at Dover and Gateway, his first DNFs in over two years, Crafton would ultimately go on to become the first back-to-back champion in the Truck Series.

On February 28, 2015, Crafton scored his sixth career Truck victory in the revived Atlanta race. On May 8, he used fuel strategy to win at Kansas after multiple other top-five Trucks ran out in the closing laps, winning a second race at one track for the first time in his career. He was also the first driver to win two truck races in Kansas. On June 5, he won at Texas, successfully defending his win from the year before, another career first. His fourth win of the season came at Kentucky after the race was cut short due to damage to the catch fence from Ben Kennedy's crash. Crafton scored his fifth victory of the season at Martinsville on October 31, marking his second win at Martinsville and the deepest into the season he had ever won a race to that point. He would add one more win in the season finale at Homestead-Miami, marking his first career victory from the pole; his season total of six wins is more than in his entire career before 2015. However, Crafton struggled more noticeably with consistency than in the previous two seasons. He crashed out at Gateway for the second year in a row after tangling with John Hunter Nemechek, and a few weeks later, he crashed out at Pocono after getting hit by Brad Keselowski. He would get swept up in a third wreck at Talladega with Stanton Barrett after being penalized for speeding on pit road, and while racing eventual series champion Erik Jones for the win at Phoenix would wreck out one final time, all of which eventually consigned him to third in points behind Jones and Tyler Reddick.

On May 13, 2016, Crafton scored his twelfth career Truck victory at Dover. Eight days later, he scored his second career victory at Charlotte, marking the first back-to-back victories in his career.

In the 2017 NextEra Energy Resources 250, while leading on the final lap, Crafton was caught in a late-race incident and was clipped by Ben Rhodes; the contact turned his truck, sent it airborne into a flip, before landing on its wheels. On July 19, he scored his fourteenth career victory at Eldora. Despite finishing last of the final four drivers at Homestead, Crafton wound up with his sixteenth top-ten finish of 2017.

For the first time since 2012, Crafton went winless in 2018 with a season's best finish of second at the fifth race of the season at Dover and went on to finish sixth in the final point standings despite being eliminated after the Round of 6.

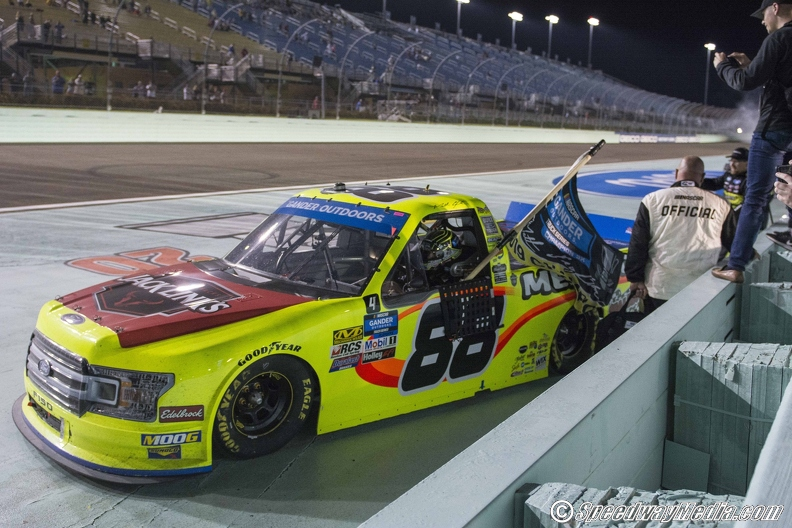
Crafton celebrating after winning the 2019 championship.

Although Crafton still won no races throughout 2019, he made his 2nd-ever Championship 4 appearance. He finished 2nd at Homestead to Austin Hill and 2 spots ahead of Ross Chastain to claim his 3rd career Truck Series Championship.

==== 2020–2025: Final full seasons ====
On July 25, 2020, Crafton broke a 67-race winless streak by winning at Kansas Speedway for the third time in his career. That was his only win of the season. He failed to make the Championship 4.

In 2021, Crafton went winless again but made the Championship 4 and benefited by late-race chaos at Martinsville. Crafton finished fourth in points.

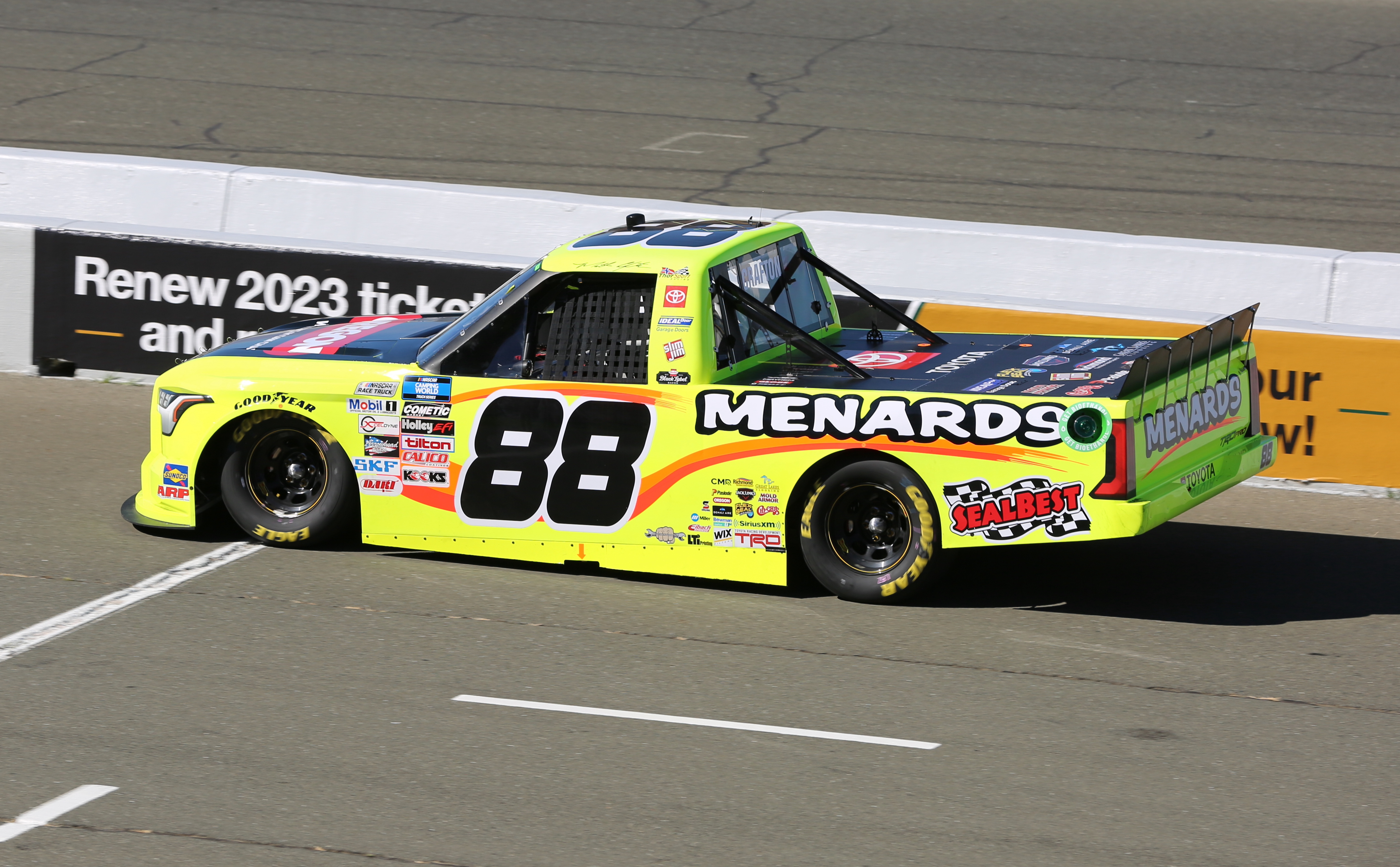
Crafton's No. 88 truck at Sonoma Raceway in 2022

Crafton did not make the playoffs easily in 2022, as he had to hold off Derek Kraus for the final spot, which he succeeded at doing. Crafton was eliminated in the first round of the playoffs, landing only 9th place in points with two top-fives for the season.

Crafton once again made the playoffs in 2023 without winning a race but was eliminated again at Kansas. Following the Talladega fall race, Crafton attacked Nick Sanchez in the garage area as a result of an on-track incident when both of their trucks made contact with each other, triggering a multi-truck pileup. NASCAR fined Crafton $25,000 and Sanchez $5,000 for the fight. Greg Van Alst suffered a fractured vertebrae in the same crash.

In 2024, Crafton would fail to qualify for the playoffs for the first time since the playoffs were introduced to the Truck Series in 2016.

==== 2026–present: Part-time with ThorSport ====
On August 18, 2025, it was announced that Crafton would retire from full-time competition following the season, with his ThorSport teammate Ty Majeski replacing him in the No. 88 truck for 2026. In an interview with YouTuber Stapleton42 in December 2025, Crafton confirmed that he would return to the Truck Series part-time for five to ten races in 2026, driving a different ThorSport truck.

=== Nationwide Series ===
Crafton made three starts in the Nationwide Series with Richard Childress Racing in 2013, the first of which came at Kentucky, where he finished third. In his second start at Chicagoland, he finished tenth. He then scored an additional third place finish in the Kentucky 300. He made an additional start at Las Vegas the following year, where he finished twelfth after starting 33rd.

=== Cup Series ===
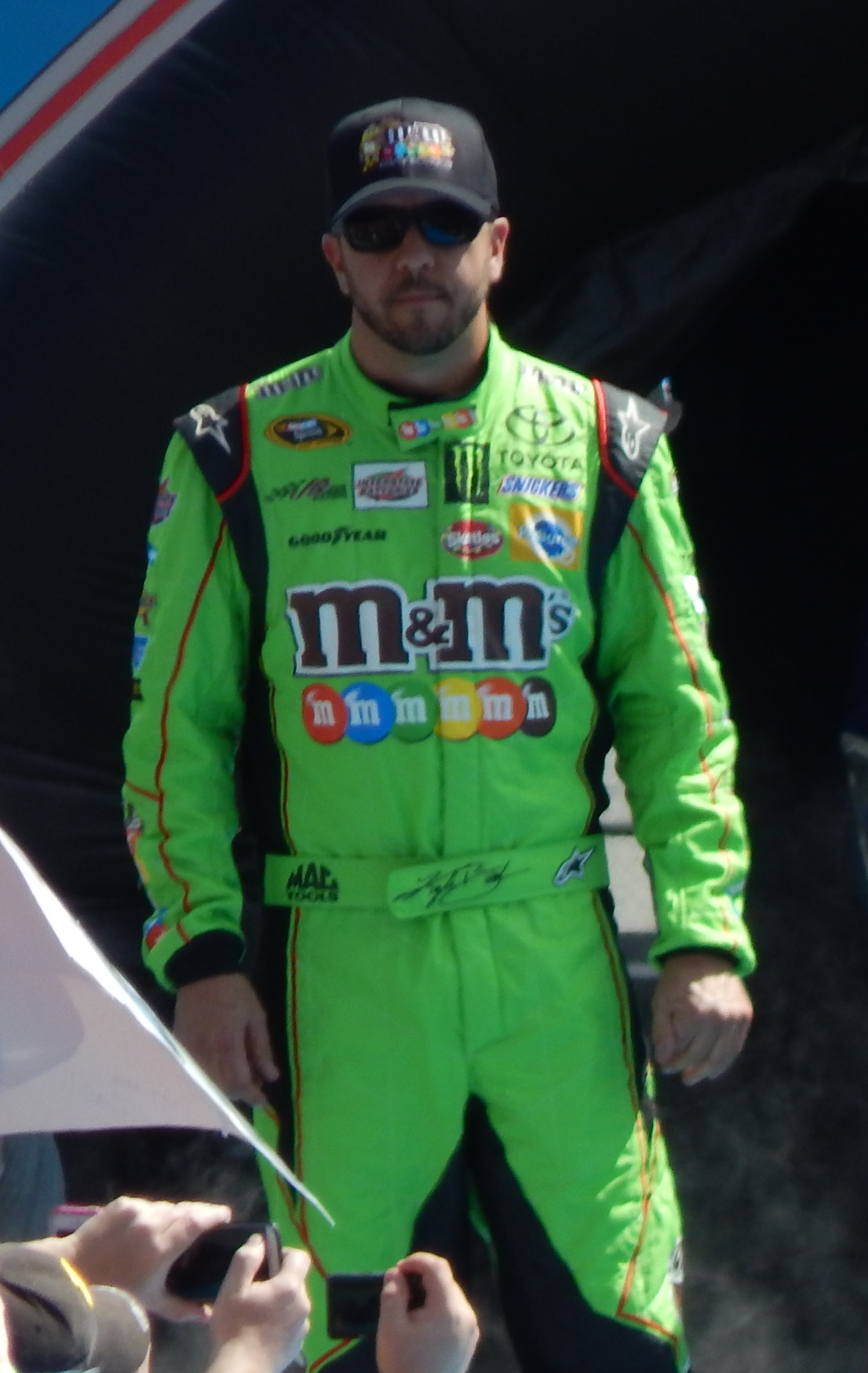
Crafton at the 2015 Daytona 500.

Because of Crafton's sponsorship with Menards, he has made spot duty with Menards' Cup teams, including taking over for Paul Menard on occasion. Crafton was called in to substitute for Menard's No. 27 Richard Childress Racing Chevrolet twice in 2014; first at January Daytona testing after a pipe burst in Menard's house, and Crafton was third fastest with a speed of 194.342 miles per hour (312.763 km/h). In March, with Menard on paternity leave, he was on stand-by to relief drive for Paul Menard at Las Vegas Motor Speedway for the Kobalt 400, due to Menard and his wife expecting their first child. Crafton practiced and qualified for Menard at the Auto Club 400, qualifying 30th. At Talladega's 2019 1000Bulbs.com 500, he was on standby for Menard's No. 21 Wood Brothers Racing Ford while Menard was dealing with neck pain; Crafton practiced the car on Friday. Menard eventually ran the first stage before Crafton relieved him for the remainder of the race; he was involved in a multi-car wreck on lap 163 but finished fourteenth.

In 2014, he attempted to make his Cup Series debut with RAB Racing in the No. 29 at the Brickyard 400, but failed to qualify. Later in the year, he returned to the Childress Cup paddock, qualifying the No. 78 Furniture Row Racing Chevy at the Pure Michigan 400 in place of Martin Truex Jr., who was on leave as his girlfriend, Sherry Pollex, underwent cancer treatment.

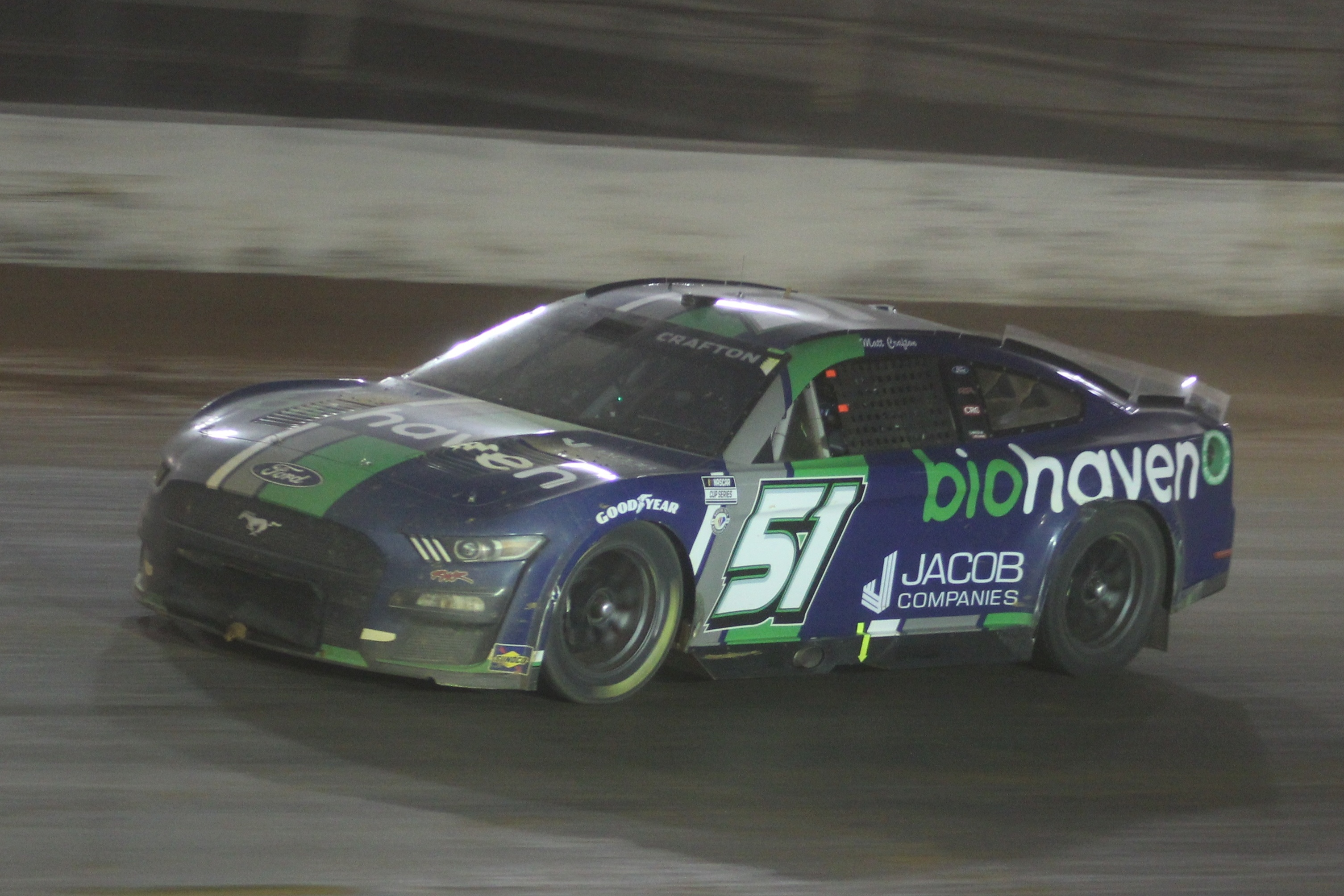
Crafton in the No. 51 at Bristol Dirt in 2023

Crafton ran his first Cup race in the 2015 Daytona 500, substituting for Kyle Busch in the Joe Gibbs Racing No. 18 after Busch suffered a compound leg fracture in the previous day's Xfinity Series race. He finished eighteenth after starting 43rd. Over four years later, he made his second Cup start in the 2019 First Data 500 at Martinsville in the No. 36 of Front Row Motorsports after Matt Tifft was hospitalized with a health issue. He qualified 31st and finished 25th, five laps down. Crafton would return to the Cup Series in the 2023 Food City Dirt Race to replace Cody Ware, who had opted out of the race due to a believed personal matter. It would later be revealed that Ware was arrested for domestic battery and was indefinitely suspended by NASCAR the next day.

=== Milestones and records ===
Throughout 25 full-time seasons in the NASCAR Craftsman Truck Series, Crafton has reached several milestones and broken records, both individually and with his team:

- Crafton holds the record for the most Truck Series starts.
- Crafton holds the record for the most consecutive Truck Series starts by an active driver.
  - In the third race of the 2013 season, Crafton passed Terry Cook's record of consecutive starts in the series. Cook had previously held the record with 296 consecutive starts.
- On August 6, 2011, Crafton and teammate Johnny Sauter started ThorSport Racing's 354th NCWTS race with at least one entry in the field, eclipsing Roush Fenway Racing's previous record of 353.
- On November 14, 2014, Crafton became the first back-to-back NCWTS champion.
- On November 15, 2019, Crafton claimed his third career Championship despite going winless for the second season in a row. He became the first in Series history to claim a Championship despite finishing a season winless and the second to pull off the feat in any Series since Austin Dillon in 2013.

== Other racing ==
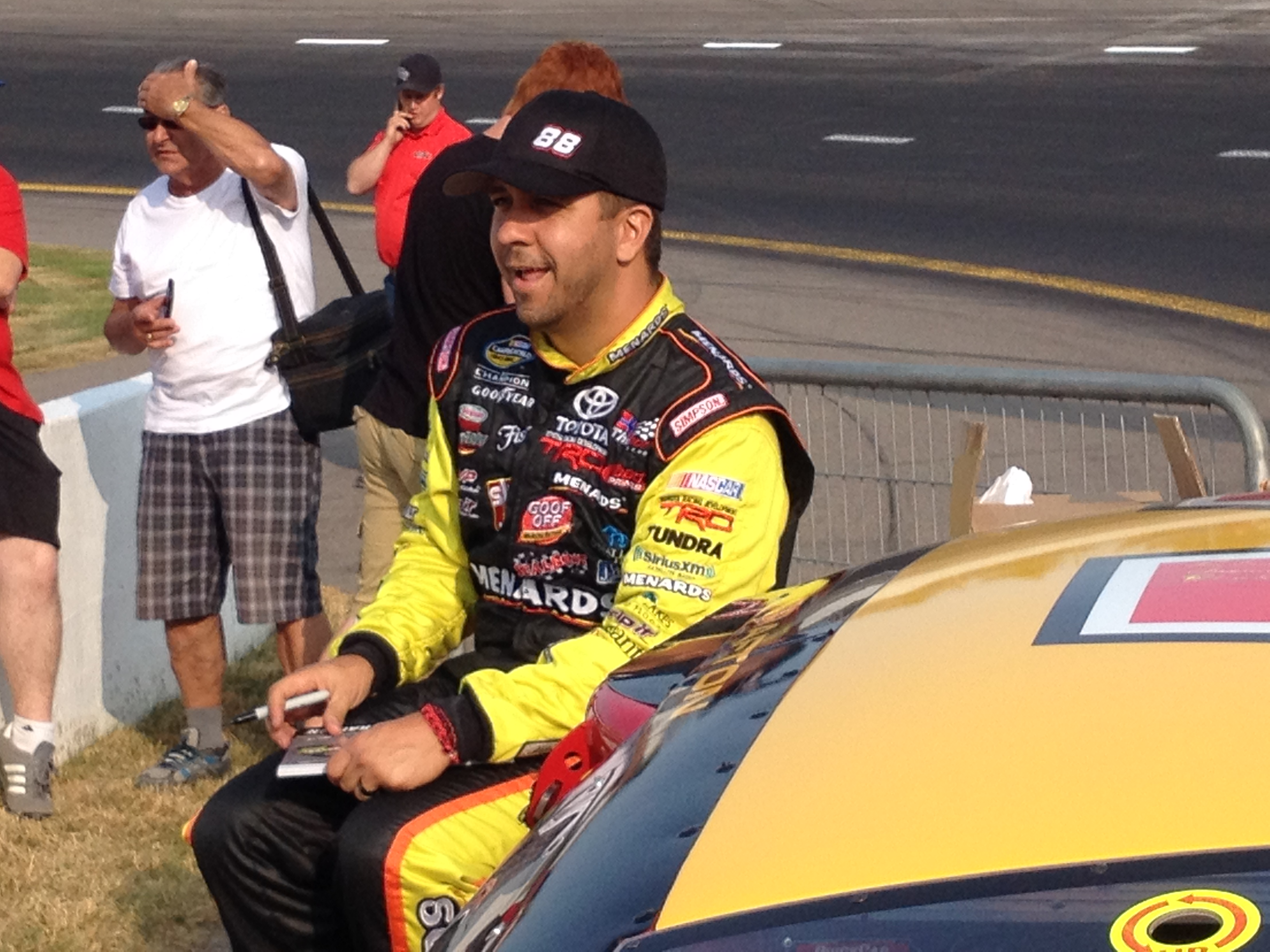
Crafton signing autographs at the 2014 IWK 250

In 2012, Crafton, supported by Travis Pastrana, competed in the TORC: The Off-Road Championship series' PRO 2WD truck race at Chicagoland, finishing third. He came back to TORC in 2015, running in the Pro 4WD division in a Chris Kyle Memorial Benefit-sponsored truck at Texas. During the race, he was forced to operate the truck with a two-wheel drive due to issues with his truck's differential.

Crafton raced in the 2014 and 2015 IWK 250 pro stock races at Riverside International Speedway in support of the IWK Health Centre in Halifax, Nova Scotia. Crafton sat on the pole for the 2014 edition of the race, and wound up finishing tenth, one lap down. In 2015 Crafton started third and quickly made his way to the front of the pack before retiring from the race with brake failure, ultimately finishing 21st.

In March 2019, Crafton participated in the Michelin Pilot Challenge sports car race at Sebring International Raceway, driving a Ford for Multimatic Motorsports alongside ThorSport Racing teammates Grant Enfinger, Ben Rhodes, and Myatt Snider.

== Motorsports career results ==
=== Racing career summary ===
Season	Series	Team	Races	Wins	Top 5	Top 10	Points	Position
1996	NASCAR Featherlite Southwest Tour	Danny Crafton	3	0	0	0	233	59th
1997	NASCAR Featherlite Southwest Tour	Danny Crafton	18	0	1	6	2259	11th
1998	NASCAR Featherlite Southwest Tour	Danny Crafton	15	1	3	6	1958	7th
1999	NASCAR Featherlite Southwest Tour	Danny Crafton	18	1	4	7	2217	5th
2000	NASCAR Featherlite Southwest Tour	Danny Crafton	19	2	11	12	2791	**1st**
2000	NASCAR Winston West Series	Jennifer Wong	1	0	1	1	180	42nd
2000	NASCAR Craftsman Truck Series	SealMaster Racing	1	0	0	1	138	83rd
2001	NASCAR Featherlite Southwest Tour	Danny Crafton	3	0	0	1	293	56th
2001	NASCAR Craftsman Truck Series	SealMaster Racing	24	0	0	11	2778	12th
2002	NASCAR Featherlite Southwest Tour	Danny Crafton	2	0	1	1	290	51st
2002	NASCAR Craftsman Truck Series	SealMaster Racing	22	0	0	6	2424	15th
2003	NASCAR Craftsman Truck Series	SealMaster Racing	25	0	0	11	3074	11th
2004	NASCAR Craftsman Truck Series	Kevin Harvick Incorporated	25	0	6	17	3379	5th
2005	NASCAR AutoZone Southwest Series	Danny Crafton	1	0	1	1	170	43rd
2005	NASCAR Craftsman Truck Series	ThorSport Racing	25	0	2	10	3095	9th
2006	NASCAR AutoZone Southwest Series	Danny Crafton	1	1	1	1	180	30th
2006	NASCAR Craftsman Truck Series	ThorSport Racing	25	0	4	10	3102	14th
2007	NASCAR Craftsman Truck Series	ThorSport Racing	25	0	1	10	3060	8th
2008	NASCAR Craftsman Truck Series	ThorSport Racing	25	1	9	12	3392	5th
2009	NASCAR Camping World Truck Series	ThorSport Racing	25	0	11	21	3772	**2nd**
2010	ARCA Racing Series	Kimmel Racing	2	0	2	2	415	55th
2010	NASCAR Camping World Truck Series	ThorSport Racing	25	0	10	19	3547	4th
2011	ARCA Racing Series	Kimmel Racing	2	0	0	0	215	87th
2011	NASCAR Camping World Truck Series	ThorSport Racing	25	1	5	13	785	8th
2012	ARCA Racing Series	ThorSport Racing	1	0	0	0	95	131st
2012	NASCAR Camping World Truck Series	ThorSport Racing	22	0	8	14	759	6th
2013	NASCAR Camping World Truck Series	ThorSport Racing	22	1	7	19	804	**1st**
2013	NASCAR Nationwide Series	Richard Childress Racing	3	0	2	3	0	NC†
2014	NASCAR Camping World Truck Series	ThorSport Racing	22	2	13	17	833	**1st**
2014	NASCAR Nationwide Series	Richard Childress Racing	1	0	0	0	0	NC†
2015	NASCAR Camping World Truck Series	ThorSport Racing	23	6	13	18	877	**3rd**
2015	NASCAR Sprint Cup Series	Joe Gibbs Racing	1	0	0	0	0	NC†
2016	NASCAR Camping World Truck Series	ThorSport Racing	23	2	8	16	4026	**2nd**
2017	NASCAR Camping World Truck Series	ThorSport Racing	23	1	5	16	4031	4th
2018	NASCAR Camping World Truck Series	ThorSport Racing	23	0	7	13	2280	6th
2019	NASCAR Gander Outdoors Truck Series	ThorSport Racing	23	0	7	18	4035	**1st**
2019	Monster Energy NASCAR Cup Series	Front Row Motorsports	1	0	0	0	0	NC†
2020	NASCAR Gander Outdoors Truck Series	ThorSport Racing	23	1	9	15	2274	5th
2021	NASCAR Camping World Truck Series	ThorSport Racing	22	0	5	12	4025	4th
2022	NASCAR Camping World Truck Series	ThorSport Racing	23	0	2	12	2208	9th
2023	NASCAR Craftsman Truck Series	ThorSport Racing	23	0	2	9	2267	9th
2023	NASCAR Cup Series	Rick Ware Racing	1	0	0	0	0	NC†
2024	NASCAR Craftsman Truck Series	ThorSport Racing	23	0	1	7	524	14th
2025	NASCAR Craftsman Truck Series	ThorSport Racing	25	0	0	5	494	15th

^{†} As Crafton was a guest driver, he was ineligible for championship points.

=== NASCAR ===
(key) (Bold – Pole position awarded by qualifying time. Italics – Pole position earned by points standings or practice time. * – Most laps led.)

==== Cup Series ====
NASCAR Cup Series results
Year	Team	No.	Make	1	2	3	4	5	6	7	8	9	10	11	12	13	14	15	16	17	18	19	20	21	22	23	24	25	26	27	28	29	30	31	32	33	34	35	36	NCSC	Pts	Ref
2008	Robby Gordon Motorsports	7	Dodge	DAY	CAL	LVS	ATL	BRI	MAR	TEX	PHO	TAL	RCH	DAR	CLT	DOV; QL^{†}	POC	MCH	SON	NHA	DAY	CHI	IND	POC	GLN	MCH	BRI	CAL	RCH	NHA	DOV	KAN	TAL	CLT	MAR	ATL	TEX	PHO	HOM	N/A	–	
2009	Robby Gordon Motorsports	7	Toyota	DAY	CAL	LVS	ATL	BRI	MAR	TEX	PHO	TAL	RCH	DAR	CLT	DOV	POC	MCH	SON	NHA	DAY	CHI	IND	POC	GLN	MCH	BRI	ATL	RCH	NHA	DOV	KAN	CAL	CLT	MAR	TAL	TEX	PHO	HOM; QL^{†}	N/A	–	
2014	Richard Childress Racing	27	Chevy	DAY	PHO	LVS	BRI	CAL; QL^{‡}	MAR	TEX	DAR	RCH	TAL	KAN	CLT	DOV	POC	MCH	SON	KEN	DAY	NHA																		74th	0^{1}	
2014	RAB Racing	29	Toyota																				IND; DNQ	POC	GLN															74th	0^{1}	
2014	Furniture Row Racing	78	Chevy																							MCH; QL^{¤}	BRI	ATL	RCH	CHI	NHA	DOV	KAN	CLT	TAL	MAR	TEX	PHO	HOM	74th	0^{1}	
2015	Joe Gibbs Racing	18	Toyota	DAY; 18	ATL	LVS	PHO	CAL	MAR	TEX	BRI	RCH	TAL	KAN	CLT	DOV	POC	MCH	SON	DAY	KEN	NHA	IND	POC	GLN	MCH	BRI	DAR	RCH	CHI	NHA	DOV	CLT	KAN	TAL	MAR	TEX	PHO	HOM	60th	0^{1}	
2019	Wood Brothers Racing	21	Ford	DAY	ATL	LVS	PHO	CAL	MAR	TEX	BRI	RCH	TAL	DOV	KAN	CLT	POC	MCH	SON	CHI	DAY	KEN	NHA	POC	GLN	MCH	BRI	DAR	IND	LVS	RCH	ROV	DOV	TAL; RL^{#}	KAN					53rd	0^{1}	
2019	Front Row Motorsports	36	Ford																																	MAR; 25	TEX	PHO	HOM	53rd	0^{1}	
2023	Rick Ware Racing	51	Ford	DAY	CAL	LVS	PHO	ATL	COA	RCH	BRD; 34	MAR	TAL	DOV	KAN	DAR	CLT	GTW	SON	NSH	CSC	ATL	NHA	POC	RCH	MCH	IRC	GLN	DAY	DAR	KAN	BRI	TEX	TAL	ROV	LVS	HOM	MAR	PHO	64th	0^{1}	
^{†} – Qualified for Robby Gordon · ^{‡} – Paul Menard on paternity leave for qualifying · ^{¤} – Martin Truex Jr. on family leave for qualifying · ^{#} – Relieved Paul Menard during race

===== Daytona 500 =====
Year	Team	Manufacturer	Start	Finish
2015	Joe Gibbs Racing	Toyota	4	18

==== Nationwide Series ====
NASCAR Nationwide Series results
Year	Team	No.	Make	1	2	3	4	5	6	7	8	9	10	11	12	13	14	15	16	17	18	19	20	21	22	23	24	25	26	27	28	29	30	31	32	33	NNSC	Pts	Ref
2013	Richard Childress Racing	33	Chevy	DAY	PHO	LVS	BRI	CAL	TEX	RCH	TAL	DAR	CLT	DOV	IOW	MCH	ROA	KEN; 3	DAY	NHA	CHI; 10	IND	IOW	GLN	MOH	BRI	ATL	RCH	CHI	KEN; 3	DOV	KAN	CLT	TEX	PHO	HOM	102nd	0^{1}	
2014	Richard Childress Racing	33	Chevy	DAY	PHO	LVS; 12	BRI	CAL	TEX	DAR	RCH	TAL	IOW	CLT	DOV	MCH	ROA	KEN	DAY	NHA	CHI	IND	IOW	GLN	MOH	BRI	ATL	RCH	CHI	KEN	DOV	KAN	CLT	TEX	PHO	HOM	98th	0^{1}	

==== Craftsman Truck Series ====
NASCAR Craftsman Truck Series results
Year	Team	No.	Make	1	2	3	4	5	6	7	8	9	10	11	12	13	14	15	16	17	18	19	20	21	22	23	24	25	NCTC	Pts	Ref
2000	SealMaster Racing	88	Chevy	DAY	HOM	PHO	MMR	MAR	PIR	GTW	MEM	PPR	EVG	TEX	KEN	GLN	MLW	NHA	NZH	MCH	IRP	NSV	CIC	RCH	DOV	TEX	CAL; 9		83rd	138	
2001	SealMaster Racing	88	Chevy	DAY; 27	HOM; 26	MMR; 30	MAR; 6	GTW; 7	DAR; 8	PPR; 6	DOV; 9	TEX; 16	MEM; 10	MLW; 9	KAN; 22	KEN; 21	NHA; 10	IRP; 7	NSH; 25	CIC; 26	NZH; 22	RCH; 32	SBO; 10	TEX; 12	LVS; 28	PHO; 15	CAL; 9		12th	2778	
2002	SealMaster Racing	88	Chevy	DAY; 23	DAR; 14	MAR; 20	GTW; 10	PPR; 29	DOV; 27	TEX; 7	MEM; 21	MLW; 29	KAN; 10	KEN; 17	NHA; 13	MCH; 16	IRP; 10	NSH; 18	RCH; 32	TEX; 23	SBO; 12	LVS; 25	CAL; 17	PHO; 9	HOM; 9				15th	2424	
2003	SealMaster Racing	88	Chevy	DAY; 12	DAR; 11	MMR; 29	MAR; 13	CLT; 9	DOV; 22	TEX; 10	MEM; 10	MLW; 9	KAN; 19	KEN; 7	GTW; 10	MCH; 25	IRP; 10	NSH; 10	BRI; 6	RCH; 14	NHA; 10	CAL; 14	LVS; 9	SBO; 16	TEX; 12	MAR; 28	PHO; 14		11th	3074	
2003	SealMaster Racing	98	Chevy																									HOM; 15	11th	3074	
2004	Kevin Harvick Incorporated	6	Chevy	DAY; 19	ATL; 5	MAR; 7	MFD; 10	CLT; 9	DOV; 29	TEX; 8	MEM; 6	MLW; 10	KAN; 5	KEN; 4	GTW; 6	MCH; 12	IRP; 7	NSH; 7	BRI; 3	RCH; 21	NHA; 13	LVS; 22	CAL; 24	TEX; 21	MAR; 6	PHO; 3	DAR; 8	HOM; 5	5th	3379	
2005	ThorSport Racing	88	Chevy	DAY; 11	CAL; 6	ATL; 14	MAR; 15	GTW; 17	MFD; 19	CLT; 9	DOV; 9	TEX; 5	MCH; 22	MLW; 18	KAN; 27	KEN; 7	MEM; 7	IRP; 4	NSH; 13	BRI; 12	RCH; 7	**NHA**; 35	LVS; 11	MAR; 12	ATL; 22	TEX; 17	PHO; 8	HOM; 10	9th	3095	
2006	ThorSport Racing	88	Chevy	DAY; 26	CAL; 20	ATL; 9	MAR; 3	GTW; 12	CLT; 8	MFD; 6	DOV; 15	TEX; 12	MCH; 5	MLW; 34	KAN; 20	KEN; 7	MEM; 3	IRP; 20	NSH; 9	BRI; 12	NHA; 8	LVS; 21	TAL; 18	MAR; 34	ATL; 12	TEX; 15	PHO; 5	HOM; 12	14th	3102	
2007	ThorSport Racing	88	Chevy	DAY; 8	CAL; 11	ATL; 3	MAR; 17	KAN; 10	CLT; 7	MFD; 35	DOV; 26	TEX; 7	MCH; 34	MLW; 9	MEM; 10	KEN; 16	IRP; 14	NSH; 11	BRI; 12	GTW; 9	NHA; 11	LVS; 26	TAL; 18	MAR; 18	ATL; 7	TEX; 7	PHO; 14	HOM; 12	8th	3060	
2008	ThorSport Racing	88	Chevy	DAY; 24	CAL; 15	ATL; 4	MAR; 2	KAN; 21	CLT; 1	MFD; 12	DOV; 5	TEX; 7	MCH; 15	MLW; 2	MEM; 3	KEN; 3	IRP; 4	NSH; 11	BRI; 21	GTW; 12	NHA; 12	LVS; 3	TAL; 16	MAR; 8	ATL; 29	TEX; 19	PHO; 8	HOM; 17	5th	3392	
2009	ThorSport Racing	88	Chevy	DAY; 8	CAL; 7	ATL; 11	MAR; 9	KAN; 7	CLT; 3	DOV; 6	TEX; 2	MCH; 4	MLW; 16	MEM; 5	KEN; 3	IRP; 16	NSH; 5	BRI; 2	**CHI**; 14	IOW; 6	GTW; 6	NHA; 4	LVS; 2	MAR; 9	TAL; 10	**TEX**; 2	PHO; 8	HOM; 2	2nd	3772	
2010	ThorSport Racing	88	Chevy	DAY; 5	ATL; 27	MAR; 7	NSH; 6	KAN; 25	DOV; 7	CLT; 11	TEX; 18	MCH; 27	IOW; 3	GTW; 5	IRP; 3	POC; 3	NSH; 7	DAR; 6	BRI; 31	CHI; 7	KEN; 10	NHA; 4	LVS; 5	MAR; 10	TAL; 4	**TEX**; 3	PHO; 4	HOM; 10	4th	3547	
2011	ThorSport Racing	88	Chevy	DAY; 10	PHO; 7	DAR; 4	MAR; 11	NSH; 6	DOV; 3	CLT; 26	KAN; 18	TEX; 29	KEN; 32	IOW; 1	NSH; 11	IRP; 6	POC; 8	**MCH**; 21	BRI; 21	ATL; 7	CHI; 7	NHA; 6	KEN; 23	LVS; 2	TAL; 31	**MAR**; 12	TEX; 5	HOM; 19	8th	785	
2012	ThorSport Racing	88	Toyota	DAY; 23	MAR; 24	ROC; 3	KAN; 12	CLT; 15	DOV; 8	TEX; 2	**KEN**; 4	IOW; 3	CHI; 4	POC; 4	MCH; 16	BRI; 9	ATL; 9	IOW; 9	KEN; 9	LVS; 2	TAL; 18	MAR; 4	TEX; 6	PHO; 20	HOM; 12				6th	759	
2013	ThorSport Racing	88	Toyota	DAY; 9	MAR; 2	ROC; 6	KAN; 1	CLT; 4	DOV; 2	TEX; 4	KEN; 10	IOW; 6	ELD; 8	POC; 8	MCH; 9	BRI; 10	MSP; 10	IOW; 7	CHI; 4	LVS; 11	TAL; 9	MAR; 17	TEX; 10	PHO; 5	HOM; 21				1st	804	
2014	ThorSport Racing	88	Toyota	DAY; 13	MAR; 1	KAN; 2	CLT; 2	DOV; 23	TEX; 1*	GTW; 26	KEN; 6	IOW; 3	ELD; 9	POC; 14	MCH; 2	BRI; 4	MSP; 6	CHI; 2	NHA; 3	LVS; 3	TAL; 14	MAR; 3	TEX; 5	PHO; 2	HOM; 9				1st	833	
2015	ThorSport Racing	88	Toyota	DAY; 8	ATL; 1*	MAR; 2	KAN; 1	CLT; 3	DOV; 5	TEX; 1*	GTW; 21	IOW; 4	KEN; 1	ELD; 9	POC; 28	**MCH**; 6	BRI; 7	MSP; 2	CHI; 14	NHA; 2	**LVS**; 8*	TAL; 24*	MAR; 1	**TEX**; 4	PHO; 23	**HOM**; 1*			3rd	877	
2016	ThorSport Racing	88	Toyota	DAY; 10	**ATL**; 30*	MAR; 7	KAN; 2*	DOV; 1	CLT; 1*	TEX; 2*	IOW; 8	GTW; 27	KEN; 8	ELD; 10	POC; 12	BRI; 32	MCH; 7	MSP; 4	CHI; 27	NHA; 3	LVS; 8	TAL; 22	MAR; 17	TEX; 2	PHO; 3	HOM; 7			2nd	4026	
2017	ThorSport Racing	88	Toyota	DAY; 14	ATL; 2	MAR; 9	KAN; 16	CLT; 6	DOV; 11	TEX; 9	GTW; 4	IOW; 19	KEN; 8	ELD; 1	POC; 6	**MCH**; 6	BRI; 2	MSP; 25	CHI; 16	NHA; 6	LVS; 7	TAL; 9	MAR; 2*	TEX; 9	PHO; 21	HOM; 6			4th	4031	
2018	ThorSport Racing	88	Ford	DAY; 19	ATL; 5	LVS; 29	MAR; 15	DOV; 2	KAN; 6	CLT; 11	TEX; 5	IOW; 26	GTW; 20	CHI; 11	KEN; 3	ELD; 4	POC; 9	MCH; 10*	BRI; 8	MSP; 5	LVS; 5	TAL; 26	MAR; 13	TEX; 9	PHO; 11	HOM; 6			6th	2280	
2019	ThorSport Racing	88	Ford	DAY; 5	ATL; 14	LVS; 3	MAR; 8	TEX; 5	DOV; 5	**KAN**; 6	**CLT**; 5	TEX; 2	IOW; 7	GTW; 9	CHI; 8	KEN; 13	POC; 6	ELD; 10	MCH; 10	BRI; 7	MSP; 11	LVS; 30	**TAL**; 8	MAR; 23	PHO; 6	HOM; 2			1st	4035	
2020	ThorSport Racing	88	Ford	DAY; 15	LVS; 4	CLT; 35	ATL; 12	HOM; 9	POC; 40	KEN; 3	TEX; 3	KAN; 4	KAN; 1	MCH; 23	DRC; 4	DOV; 2	GTW; 14	DAR; 14	RCH; 2	BRI; 10	LVS; 9	TAL; 8	KAN; 8	TEX; 6	MAR; 5	PHO; 14			5th	2274	
2021	ThorSport Racing	88	Toyota	DAY; 15	DRC; 6	LVS; 5	ATL; 8	BRD; 14	RCH; 18	KAN; 24	DAR; 4	COA; 15	CLT; 30	TEX; 20	NSH; 6	POC; 6	KNX; 6	GLN; 22	GTW; 2	DAR; 10	BRI; 7	LVS; 3	TAL; 14	MAR; 5	PHO; 12				4th	4025	
2022	ThorSport Racing	88	Toyota	DAY; 27	LVS; 7	ATL; 25	COA; 13	MAR; 7	BRD; 9	DAR; 5	KAN; 9	TEX; 9	CLT; 18	GTW; 12	SON; 34	KNX; 7	NSH; 10	MOH; 18	POC; 15	IRP; 9	RCH; 7	KAN; 15	BRI; 5	TAL; 22	HOM; 8	PHO; 12			9th	2208	
2023	ThorSport Racing	88	Ford	DAY; 9	LVS; 11	ATL; 9	COA; 33	TEX; 13	BRD; 4	MAR; 26	KAN; 11	DAR; 12	NWS; 7	CLT; 12	GTW; 25	NSH; 15	MOH; 6	POC; 14	RCH; 7	IRP; 9	MLW; 5	KAN; 33	BRI; 16	TAL; 24	HOM; 7	PHO; 11			9th	2167	
2024	ThorSport Racing	88	Ford	DAY; 7	ATL; 13	LVS; 7	BRI; 4	COA; 23	MAR; 12	TEX; 15	KAN; 10	DAR; 31	NWS; 20	CLT; 31	GTW; 20	NSH; 23	POC; 8	IRP; 24	RCH; 15	MLW; 10	BRI; 6	KAN; 25	TAL; 23	HOM; 11	MAR; 13	PHO; 19			14th	524	
2025	ThorSport Racing	88	Ford	DAY; 27	ATL; 22	LVS; 9	HOM; 13	MAR; 28	BRI; 16	ROC; 24	TEX; 7	KAN; 13	NWS; 18	CLT; 20	NSH; 25	MCH; 6	POC; 27	LRP; 19	IRP; 18	GLN; 13	RCH; 26	DAR; 21	BRI; 10	NHA; 26	ROV; 24	TAL; 7	MAR; 29	PHO; 13	15th	494	
2026	ThorSport Racing	66	Ford	DAY	ATL	STP	DAR	ROC	BRI	TEX	GLN	DOV	CLT	NSS	MCH	COR	LRP	NWS	IRP	RCH	NHA	BRI	KAN	CLT	PHO	TAL	MAR	HOM; 25	80th	12	

^{*} Season still in progress
^{1} Ineligible for series points

=== ARCA Racing Series ===
(key) (Bold – Pole position awarded by qualifying time. Italics – Pole position earned by points standings or practice time. * – Most laps led.)

ARCA Racing Series results
Year	Team	No.	Make	1	2	3	4	5	6	7	8	9	10	11	12	13	14	15	16	17	18	19	20	ARSC	Pts	Ref
2010	Kimmel Racing	88	Ford	DAY	PBE	SLM	TEX	TAL	TOL; 5	POC	MCH	IOW; 5	MFD	POC	BLN	NJE	ISF	CHI	DSF	TOL	SLM	KAN	ROC	55th	415	
2011	Kimmel Racing	88	Ford	DAY	TAL	SLM	TOL; 18	NJE	CHI	POC	MCH	WIN	BLN	IOW	IRP; 32	POC	ISF	MAD	DSF	SLM	KAN	TOL		87th	215	
2012	ThorSport Racing	88	Toyota	DAY	MOB	SLM	TAL	TOL	ELK	POC	MCH	WIN	NJE	IOW	CHI	**IRP**; 31	POC	BLN	ISF	MAD	SLM	DSF	KAN	131st	95	

==== Camping World West Series ====
NASCAR Camping World West Series results
Year	Team	No.	Make	1	2	3	4	5	6	7	8	9	10	11	12	13	NCWWSC	Pts	Ref
2000	Jennifer Wong	21	Ford	PHO	MMR	LVS	CAL	LAG	IRW	POR	EVG	IRW	RMR	MMR	IRW; 2*		42nd	180	
2009	Jennifer Wong	45	Toyota	CTS	AAS	PHO; DNQ	MAD	IOW	DCS	SON	IRW	PIR	MMP	CNS	IOW	AAS	70th	61	

Sporting positions
Preceded by Kurt Busch	NASCAR Featherlite Southwest Tour Champion; 2000	Succeeded by Craig Raudman
Preceded by James Buescher; Brett Moffitt	NASCAR Truck Series Champion; 2013, 2014; 2019	Succeeded by Erik Jones; Sheldon Creed
