= 2017 Hisense 4K TV 300 =

Tenth race of the 2017 NASCAR Xfinity Series

2017 Hisense 4K TV
Race details
- Race 10 of 33 in the 2017 NASCAR Xfinity Series
- Date: May 27, 2017
- Official name: 36th Annual Hisense 4K TV
- Location: Concord, North Carolina, Charlotte Motor Speedway
- Course: Permanent racing facility
- Course length: 1.5 miles (2.41 km)
- Distance: 200 laps, 300 mi (482.803 km)
- Scheduled distance: 200 laps, 300 mi (482.803 km)
- Average speed: 113.72 miles per hour (183.01 km/h)

Pole position
Driver	Justin Allgaier	JR Motorsports
- Time: 29.591

Most laps led
Driver	Ryan Blaney	Team Penske
- Laps: 107

Winner
No. 12	Ryan Blaney	Team Penske

Television in the United States
- Network: Fox Sports 1
- Announcers: Adam Alexander, Michael Waltrip, Clint Bowyer

Radio in the United States
- Radio: Performance Racing Network

The 2017 Hisense 4K TV 300 was the 10th stock car race of the 2017 NASCAR Xfinity Series season and the 36th iteration of the event. The race was held on Saturday, May 27, 2017, in Concord, North Carolina at Charlotte Motor Speedway, a 1.5 miles (2.4 km) permanent quad-oval. The race took the scheduled 200 laps to complete. At race's end, Ryan Blaney, driving for Team Penske, would climb his way to the lead on the final restart with three to go to win his fifth career NASCAR Xfinity Series win and his first win of the season. To fill out the podium, Kevin Harvick of Stewart–Haas Racing and Austin Dillon of Richard Childress Racing would finish second and third, respectively.

== Entry list ==
- (R) denotes rookie driver.
- (i) denotes driver who is ineligible for series driver points.

#	Driver	Team	Make
00	Cole Custer (R)	Stewart–Haas Racing	Ford
0	Garrett Smithley	JD Motorsports	Chevrolet
1	Elliott Sadler	JR Motorsports	Chevrolet
01	Harrison Rhodes	JD Motorsports	Chevrolet
2	Austin Dillon (i)	Richard Childress Racing	Chevrolet
3	Ty Dillon (i)	Richard Childress Racing	Chevrolet
4	Ross Chastain	JD Motorsports	Chevrolet
5	Michael Annett	JR Motorsports	Chevrolet
6	Bubba Wallace	Roush Fenway Racing	Ford
7	Justin Allgaier	JR Motorsports	Chevrolet
07	Todd Bodine	SS-Green Light Racing	Chevrolet
8	B. J. McLeod	B. J. McLeod Motorsports	Chevrolet
9	William Byron (R)	JR Motorsports	Chevrolet
11	Blake Koch	Kaulig Racing	Chevrolet
12	Ryan Blaney (i)	Team Penske	Ford
13	Timmy Hill	MBM Motorsports	Toyota
14	J. J. Yeley	TriStar Motorsports	Toyota
16	Ryan Reed	Roush Fenway Racing	Ford
18	Christopher Bell (i)	Joe Gibbs Racing	Toyota
19	Matt Tifft (R)	Joe Gibbs Racing	Toyota
20	Denny Hamlin (i)	Joe Gibbs Racing	Toyota
21	Daniel Hemric (R)	Richard Childress Racing	Chevrolet
22	Brad Keselowski (i)	Team Penske	Ford
23	Spencer Gallagher (R)	GMS Racing	Chevrolet
24	Cale Conley	JGL Racing	Toyota
28	Dakoda Armstrong	JGL Racing	Toyota
33	Brandon Jones	Richard Childress Racing	Chevrolet
39	Ryan Sieg	RSS Racing	Chevrolet
40	Carl Long	MBM Motorsports	Dodge
41	Kevin Harvick (i)	Stewart–Haas Racing	Ford
42	Tyler Reddick	Chip Ganassi Racing	Chevrolet
48	Brennan Poole	Chip Ganassi Racing	Chevrolet
51	Jeremy Clements	Jeremy Clements Racing	Chevrolet
52	Joey Gase	Jimmy Means Racing	Chevrolet
62	Brendan Gaughan	Richard Childress Racing	Chevrolet
74	Jordan Anderson	Mike Harmon Racing	Dodge
78	Jeff Green	B. J. McLeod Motorsports	Chevrolet
90	Alex Labbé	King Autosport	Chevrolet
93	Stephen Leicht	RSS Racing	Chevrolet
96	Ben Kennedy (R)	GMS Racing	Chevrolet
98	Casey Mears	Biagi–DenBeste Racing	Ford
99	David Starr	B. J. McLeod Motorsports with SS-Green Light Racing	Chevrolet
Official entry list

== Practice ==
=== First practice ===
The first practice session was held on Friday, May 26, at 4:00 PM EST, and would last for 55 minutes. Ryan Blaney of Team Penske would set the fastest time in the session, with a lap of 29.535 and an average speed of 182.834 miles per hour (294.243 km/h).

Pos	#	Driver	Team	Make	Time	Speed
1	12	Ryan Blaney (i)	Team Penske	Ford	29.535	182.834
2	48	Brennan Poole	Chip Ganassi Racing	Chevrolet	29.566	182.642
3	20	Denny Hamlin (i)	Joe Gibbs Racing	Toyota	29.674	181.977
Full first practice results

=== Final practice ===
The final practice session was held on Friday, May 26, at 6:00 PM EST, and would last for 55 minutes. William Byron of JR Motorsports would set the fastest time in the session, with a lap of 29.554 and an average speed of 182.716 miles per hour (294.053 km/h).

Pos	#	Driver	Team	Make	Time	Speed
1	9	William Byron (R)	JR Motorsports	Chevrolet	29.554	182.716
2	18	Christopher Bell (i)	Joe Gibbs Racing	Toyota	29.669	182.008
3	33	Brandon Jones	Richard Childress Racing	Chevrolet	29.672	181.990
Full final practice results

== Qualifying ==
Qualifying was held on Saturday, May 27, at 10:05 AM EST. Since Charlotte Motor Speedway is under 2 miles (3.2 km) in length, the qualifying system was a multi-car system that included three rounds. The first round was 15 minutes, where every driver would be able to set a lap within the 15 minutes. Then, the second round would consist of the fastest 24 cars in Round 1, and drivers would have 10 minutes to set a lap. Round 3 consisted of the fastest 12 drivers from Round 2, and the drivers would have 5 minutes to set a time. Whoever was fastest in Round 3 would win the pole.

Justin Allgaier of JR Motorsports would win the pole after advancing from both preliminary rounds and setting the fastest lap in Round 3, with a time of 29.591 and an average speed of 182.488 miles per hour (293.686 km/h).

Two drivers would fail to qualify: Jeff Green and Jordan Anderson.

=== Full qualifying results ===
Pos	#	Driver	Team	Make	Time (R1)	Speed (R1)	Time (R2)	Speed (R2)	Time (R3)	Speed (R3)
1	7	Justin Allgaier	JR Motorsports	Chevrolet	30.017	179.898	29.811	181.141	29.591	182.488
2	2	Austin Dillon (i)	Richard Childress Racing	Chevrolet	30.001	179.994	29.867	180.802	29.749	181.519
3	12	Ryan Blaney (i)	Team Penske	Ford	29.930	180.421	29.810	181.147	29.772	181.378
4	21	Daniel Hemric (R)	Richard Childress Racing	Chevrolet	29.985	180.090	29.811	181.141	29.781	181.324
5	41	Kevin Harvick (i)	Stewart–Haas Racing	Ford	30.285	178.306	29.910	180.542	29.794	181.245
6	00	Cole Custer (R)	Stewart–Haas Racing	Ford	29.596	182.457	29.901	180.596	29.810	181.147
7	18	Christopher Bell (i)	Joe Gibbs Racing	Toyota	29.799	181.214	29.775	181.360	29.827	181.044
8	20	Denny Hamlin (i)	Joe Gibbs Racing	Toyota	30.124	179.259	29.864	180.820	29.859	180.850
9	16	Ryan Reed	Roush Fenway Racing	Ford	30.106	179.366	29.945	180.331	30.029	179.826
10	42	Tyler Reddick	Chip Ganassi Racing	Chevrolet	30.145	179.134	29.910	180.542	30.092	179.450
11	48	Brennan Poole	Chip Ganassi Racing	Chevrolet	30.029	179.826	29.955	180.270	30.176	178.950
12	1	Elliott Sadler	JR Motorsports	Chevrolet	30.138	179.176	29.805	181.178	30.398	177.643
Eliminated in Round 2
13	9	William Byron (R)	JR Motorsports	Chevrolet	29.780	181.330	29.993	180.042	-	-
14	6	Bubba Wallace	Roush Fenway Racing	Ford	30.212	178.737	29.999	180.006	-	-
15	3	Ty Dillon (i)	Richard Childress Racing	Chevrolet	30.253	178.495	30.035	179.790	-	-
16	39	Ryan Sieg	RSS Racing	Chevrolet	30.317	178.118	30.049	179.706	-	-
17	62	Brendan Gaughan	Richard Childress Racing	Chevrolet	30.095	179.432	30.049	179.706	-	-
18	11	Blake Koch	Kaulig Racing	Chevrolet	30.002	179.988	30.071	179.575	-	-
19	19	Matt Tifft (R)	Joe Gibbs Racing	Toyota	29.927	180.439	30.123	179.265	-	-
20	23	Spencer Gallagher (R)	GMS Racing	Chevrolet	30.044	179.736	30.160	179.045	-	-
21	33	Brandon Jones	Richard Childress Racing	Chevrolet	30.219	178.696	30.197	178.826	-	-
22	96	Ben Kennedy (R)	GMS Racing	Chevrolet	30.193	178.849	30.255	178.483	-	-
23	5	Michael Annett	JR Motorsports	Chevrolet	30.334	178.018	30.326	178.065	-	-
24	14	J. J. Yeley	TriStar Motorsports	Toyota	30.324	178.077	30.835	175.126	-	-
Eliminated in Round 1
25	98	Casey Mears	Biagi–DenBeste Racing	Ford	30.362	177.854	-	-	-	-
26	51	Jeremy Clements	Jeremy Clements Racing	Chevrolet	30.363	177.848	-	-	-	-
27	4	Ross Chastain	JD Motorsports	Chevrolet	30.596	176.494	-	-	-	-
28	13	Timmy Hill	MBM Motorsports	Toyota	30.750	175.610	-	-	-	-
29	90	Alex Labbé	King Autosport	Chevrolet	30.781	175.433	-	-	-	-
30	93	Stephen Leicht	RSS Racing	Chevrolet	30.817	175.228	-	-	-	-
31	8	B. J. McLeod	B. J. McLeod Motorsports	Chevrolet	30.839	175.103	-	-	-	-
32	24	Cale Conley	JGL Racing	Toyota	30.840	175.097	-	-	-	-
33	99	David Starr	BJMM with SS-Green Light Racing	Chevrolet	30.878	174.882	-	-	-	-
Qualified by owner's points
34	0	Garrett Smithley	JD Motorsports	Chevrolet	30.894	174.791	-	-	-	-
35	52	Joey Gase	Jimmy Means Racing	Chevrolet	30.936	174.554	-	-	-	-
36	07	Todd Bodine	SS-Green Light Racing	Chevrolet	30.981	174.300	-	-	-	-
37	01	Harrison Rhodes	JD Motorsports	Chevrolet	31.088	173.700	-	-	-	-
38	40	Carl Long	MBM Motorsports	Dodge	32.333	167.012	-	-	-	-
39	22	Brad Keselowski (i)	Team Penske	Ford	-	-	-	-	-	-
40	28	Dakoda Armstrong	JGL Racing	Toyota	-	-	-	-	-	-
Failed to qualify
41	78	Jeff Green	B. J. McLeod Motorsports	Chevrolet	31.087	173.706	-	-	-	-
42	74	Jordan Anderson	Mike Harmon Racing	Dodge	31.581	170.989	-	-	-	-
Official qualifying results
Official starting lineup

== Race results ==
Stage 1 Laps: 45

Pos	#	Driver	Team	Make	Pts
1	41	Kevin Harvick (i)	Stewart–Haas Racing	Ford	0
2	20	Denny Hamlin (i)	Joe Gibbs Racing	Toyota	0
3	00	Cole Custer (R)	Stewart–Haas Racing	Ford	8
4	12	Ryan Blaney (i)	Team Penske	Ford	0
5	48	Brennan Poole	Chip Ganassi Racing	Chevrolet	6
6	42	Tyler Reddick	Chip Ganassi Racing	Chevrolet	5
7	2	Austin Dillon (i)	Richard Childress Racing	Chevrolet	0
8	3	Ty Dillon (i)	Richard Childress Racing	Chevrolet	0
9	22	Brad Keselowski (i)	Team Penske	Ford	0
10	16	Ryan Reed	Roush Fenway Racing	Ford	1

Stage 2 Laps: 45

Pos	#	Driver	Team	Make	Pts
1	12	Ryan Blaney (i)	Team Penske	Ford	0
2	20	Denny Hamlin (i)	Joe Gibbs Racing	Toyota	0
3	2	Austin Dillon (i)	Richard Childress Racing	Chevrolet	0
4	41	Kevin Harvick (i)	Stewart–Haas Racing	Ford	0
5	00	Cole Custer (R)	Stewart–Haas Racing	Ford	6
6	6	Bubba Wallace	Roush Fenway Racing	Ford	5
7	16	Ryan Reed	Roush Fenway Racing	Ford	4
8	3	Ty Dillon (i)	Richard Childress Racing	Chevrolet	0
9	22	Brad Keselowski (i)	Team Penske	Ford	0
10	48	Brennan Poole	Chip Ganassi Racing	Chevrolet	1

Stage 3 Laps: 110

Pos	#	Driver	Team	Make	Laps	Led	Status	Pts
1	12	Ryan Blaney (i)	Team Penske	Ford	200	107	running	0
2	41	Kevin Harvick (i)	Stewart–Haas Racing	Ford	200	58	running	0
3	2	Austin Dillon (i)	Richard Childress Racing	Chevrolet	200	20	running	0
4	18	Christopher Bell (i)	Joe Gibbs Racing	Toyota	200	0	running	0
5	20	Denny Hamlin (i)	Joe Gibbs Racing	Toyota	200	4	running	0
6	22	Brad Keselowski (i)	Team Penske	Ford	200	0	running	0
7	00	Cole Custer (R)	Stewart–Haas Racing	Ford	200	0	running	44
8	48	Brennan Poole	Chip Ganassi Racing	Chevrolet	200	0	running	36
9	62	Brendan Gaughan	Richard Childress Racing	Chevrolet	200	0	running	28
10	42	Tyler Reddick	Chip Ganassi Racing	Chevrolet	200	0	running	32
11	16	Ryan Reed	Roush Fenway Racing	Ford	200	0	running	31
12	7	Justin Allgaier	JR Motorsports	Chevrolet	200	7	running	25
13	21	Daniel Hemric (R)	Richard Childress Racing	Chevrolet	200	0	running	24
14	9	William Byron (R)	JR Motorsports	Chevrolet	200	0	running	23
15	4	Ross Chastain	JD Motorsports	Chevrolet	200	0	running	22
16	33	Brandon Jones	Richard Childress Racing	Chevrolet	200	0	running	21
17	51	Jeremy Clements	Jeremy Clements Racing	Chevrolet	200	0	running	20
18	3	Ty Dillon (i)	Richard Childress Racing	Chevrolet	200	0	running	0
19	11	Blake Koch	Kaulig Racing	Chevrolet	200	0	running	18
20	28	Dakoda Armstrong	JGL Racing	Toyota	200	0	running	17
21	98	Casey Mears	Biagi–DenBeste Racing	Ford	200	0	running	16
22	14	J. J. Yeley	TriStar Motorsports	Toyota	200	0	running	15
23	52	Joey Gase	Jimmy Means Racing	Chevrolet	200	0	running	14
24	0	Garrett Smithley	JD Motorsports	Chevrolet	200	0	running	13
25	96	Ben Kennedy (R)	GMS Racing	Chevrolet	200	0	running	12
26	19	Matt Tifft (R)	Joe Gibbs Racing	Toyota	200	0	running	11
27	39	Ryan Sieg	RSS Racing	Chevrolet	200	0	running	10
28	6	Bubba Wallace	Roush Fenway Racing	Ford	200	3	running	14
29	8	B. J. McLeod	B. J. McLeod Motorsports	Chevrolet	200	1	running	8
30	07	Todd Bodine	SS-Green Light Racing	Chevrolet	200	0	running	7
31	99	David Starr	BJMM with SS-Green Light Racing	Chevrolet	199	0	running	6
32	24	Cale Conley	JGL Racing	Toyota	198	0	running	5
33	90	Alex Labbé	King Autosport	Chevrolet	192	0	running	4
34	01	Harrison Rhodes	JD Motorsports	Chevrolet	190	0	running	3
35	1	Elliott Sadler	JR Motorsports	Chevrolet	180	0	crash	2
36	5	Michael Annett	JR Motorsports	Chevrolet	177	0	crash	1
37	23	Spencer Gallagher (R)	GMS Racing	Chevrolet	166	0	crash	1
38	13	Timmy Hill	MBM Motorsports	Toyota	22	0	electrical	1
39	40	Carl Long	MBM Motorsports	Dodge	21	0	crash	1
40	93	Stephen Leicht	RSS Racing	Chevrolet	11	0	electrical	1
Official race results

== Standings after the race ==
Drivers' Championship standings

Pos	Driver	Points
1	Elliott Sadler	332
2	Justin Allgaier	326 (–6)
3	William Byron	275 (–57)
4	Daniel Hemric	253 (–79)
5	Bubba Wallace	249 (–83)
6	Ryan Reed	237 (–95)
7	Brennan Poole	229 (–103)
8	Matt Tifft	227 (–105)
9	Michael Annett	225 (–107)
10	Blake Koch	220 (–112)
11	Cole Custer	209 (–123)
12	Dakoda Armstrong	191 (–141)
Official driver's standings

- Note: Only the first 12 positions are included for the driver standings.

Previous race: 2017 Sparks Energy 300	NASCAR Xfinity Series; 2017 season	Next race: 2017 OneMain Financial 200
