= 2014 VFW Sport Clips Help a Hero 200 =

Seventh race of the 2014 NASCAR Nationwide Series

Race details
- Race 7 of 33 of the 2013 NASCAR Nationwide Series
- Date: April 11, 2014
- Official name: 32nd Annual VFW Sport Clips Help a Hero 200
- Location: Darlington, South Carolina, Darlington Raceway
- Course: Permanent racing facility
- Course length: 1.366 miles (2.198 km)
- Distance: 147 laps, 200.802 mi (323.159 km)
- Scheduled distance: 147 laps, 200.802 mi (323.159 km)
- Average speed: 113.751 miles per hour (183.064 km/h)

Pole position
Driver	Kyle Busch	Joe Gibbs Racing
- Time: 28.314

Most laps led
Driver	Kyle Busch	Joe Gibbs Racing
- Laps: 84

Winner
No. 9	Chase Elliott	JR Motorsports

Television in the United States
- Network: ESPN2
- Announcers: Allen Bestwick, Rusty Wallace, Andy Petree

Radio in the United States
- Radio: Motor Racing Network

The 2014 VFW Sport Clips Help a Hero 200 was the seventh stock car race of the 2014 NASCAR Nationwide Series season, and the 32nd iteration of the event. The race was held on Friday, April 11, 2014, in Darlington, South Carolina, at Darlington Raceway, a 1.366 miles (2.198 km) permanent egg-shaped oval racetrack. The race took the scheduled 147 laps to complete. On the final restart with two to go, Chase Elliott, rookie for JR Motorsports, would manage to charge from sixth to first, passing for the lead on the final turn to win his second career NASCAR Nationwide Series victory and his second win of the season. To fill out the podium, Elliott Sadler and Matt Kenseth, both driving for Joe Gibbs Racing, would finish second and third, respectively.

== Background ==
The layout of Darlington Raceway, the venue where the race was held.

The race was held at Darlington Raceway, which is a race track built for NASCAR racing located in Darlington, South Carolina. It is nicknamed "The Lady in Black" and "The Track Too Tough to Tame" by many NASCAR fans and drivers and advertised as "A NASCAR Tradition." It is of a unique, somewhat egg-shaped design, an oval with the ends of very different configurations, a condition which supposedly arose from the proximity of one end of the track to a minnow pond the owner refused to relocate. This situation makes it very challenging for the crews to set up their cars' handling in a way that will be effective at both ends.

=== Entry list ===
- (R) denotes rookie driver.
- (i) denotes driver who is ineligible for series driver points.

#	Driver	Team	Make	Sponsor
01	Landon Cassill	JD Motorsports	Chevrolet	SEM Products
2	Brian Scott	Richard Childress Racing	Chevrolet	Shore Lodge
3	Ty Dillon (R)	Richard Childress Racing	Chevrolet	Yuengling Light Lager
4	Jeffrey Earnhardt	JD Motorsports	Chevrolet	JD Motorsports
5	Kevin Harvick (i)	JR Motorsports	Chevrolet	Armour Vienna Sausage
6	Trevor Bayne	Roush Fenway Racing	Ford	AdvoCare
7	Regan Smith	JR Motorsports	Chevrolet	TaxSlayer
9	Chase Elliott (R)	JR Motorsports	Chevrolet	NAPA Auto Parts
10	Blake Koch	TriStar Motorsports	Toyota	SupportMilitary.org
11	Elliott Sadler	Joe Gibbs Racing	Toyota	Sport Clips Haircuts
13	Matt Carter	MBM Motorsports	Toyota	Headrush
14	Eric McClure	TriStar Motorsports	Toyota	Hefty Ultimate
16	Ryan Reed (R)	Roush Fenway Racing	Ford	Lilly Diabetes
17	Tanner Berryhill (R)	Vision Racing	Dodge	BWP Bats
19	Mike Bliss	TriStar Motorsports	Toyota	TriStar Motorsports
20	Matt Kenseth (i)	Joe Gibbs Racing	Toyota	GameStop, Call of Duty: Ghosts
22	Joey Logano (i)	Team Penske	Ford	Snap-on
23	Carlos Contreras	Rick Ware Racing	Chevrolet	Voli Vodka
28	J. J. Yeley	JGL Racing	Dodge	JGL Racing
31	Dylan Kwasniewski (R)	Turner Scott Motorsports	Chevrolet	AccuDoc Solutions, Rockstar
33	Cale Conley (i)	Richard Childress Racing	Chevrolet	Okuma
39	Ryan Sieg (R)	RSS Racing	Chevrolet	RSS Racing
40	Josh Wise (i)	The Motorsports Group	Chevrolet	The Motorsports Group
42	Kyle Larson (i)	Turner Scott Motorsports	Chevrolet	Cartwheel by Target
43	Dakoda Armstrong (R)	Richard Petty Motorsports	Ford	WinField United
44	David Starr	TriStar Motorsports	Toyota	Striping Technologies
46	Matt DiBenedetto	The Motorsports Group	Chevrolet	The Motorsports Group
51	Jeremy Clements	Jeremy Clements Racing	Chevrolet	RepairableVehicles.com
52	Joey Gase	Jimmy Means Racing	Chevrolet	Jimmy Means Racing
54	Kyle Busch (i)	Joe Gibbs Racing	Toyota	Monster Energy
55	Todd Bodine (i)	Viva Motorsports	Chevrolet	Viva Motorsports
60	Chris Buescher (R)	Roush Fenway Racing	Ford	Mustang 50 Years
62	Brendan Gaughan	Richard Childress Racing	Chevrolet	South Point Hotel, Casino & Spa
70	Derrike Cope	Derrike Cope Racing	Chevrolet	Youtheory
74	Mike Harmon	Mike Harmon Racing	Dodge	Mike Harmon Racing
76	Tommy Joe Martins (R)	Martins Motorsports	Dodge	Martins Motorsports
87	Kevin Lepage	JD Motorsports	Chevrolet	JD Motorsports
91	Jeff Green	TriStar Motorsports	Toyota	TriStar Motorsports
93	Mike Wallace	JGL Racing	Dodge	Unker's, Put On The Brakes
99	James Buescher	RAB Racing	Toyota	Ruud
Official entry list

== Practice ==
=== First practice ===
The first practice session was held on Thursday, April 10, at 1:00 p.m. EST. The session lasted for one hour. Joey Logano, driving for Team Penske, would set the fastest time in the session, with a lap of 29.033 and an average speed of 169.380 miles per hour (272.591 km/h).

Pos.	#	Driver	Team	Make	Time	Speed
1	22	Joey Logano (i)	Team Penske	Ford	29.033	169.380
2	54	Kyle Busch (i)	Joe Gibbs Racing	Toyota	29.150	168.700
3	42	Kyle Larson (i)	Turner Scott Motorsports	Chevrolet	29.165	168.613
Full first practice results

=== Final practice ===
The final practice session, sometimes referred to as Happy Hour, was held on Thursday, April 10, at 2:30 p.m. EST. The session lasted for one hour and 30 minutes. Chris Buescher, driving for Roush Fenway Racing, would set the fastest time in the session, with a lap of 28.865 and an average speed of 170.365 miles per hour (274.176 km/h).

Pos.	#	Driver	Team	Make	Time	Speed
1	60	Chris Buescher (R)	Roush Fenway Racing	Ford	28.865	170.365
2	54	Kyle Busch (i)	Joe Gibbs Racing	Toyota	29.140	168.758
3	3	Ty Dillon (R)	Richard Childress Racing	Chevrolet	29.190	168.469
Full Happy Hour practice results

== Qualifying ==
Qualifying was held on Friday, April 11, at 4:10 p.m. EST. Since Darlington Raceway is at least 1.25 miles (2.01 km) in length, the qualifying system was a multi-car system that included three rounds. The first round was 25 minutes, where every driver would be able to set a lap within the 25 minutes. Then, the second round would consist of the fastest 24 cars in Round 1, and drivers would have 10 minutes to set a lap. Round 3 consisted of the fastest 12 drivers from Round 2, and the drivers would have 5 minutes to set a time. Whoever was fastest in Round 3 would win the pole.

Kyle Busch, driving for Joe Gibbs Racing, would win the pole after setting a time of 28.314 and an average speed of 173.681 mph (279.512 km/h) in the third round.

No drivers would fail to qualify.

=== Full qualifying results ===
Pos.	#	Driver	Team	Make	Time (R1)	Speed (R1)	Time (R2)	Speed (R2)	Time (R3)	Speed (R3)
1	54	Kyle Busch (i)	Joe Gibbs Racing	Toyota	-*	-*	-*	-*	28.314	173.681
2	9	Chase Elliott (R)	JR Motorsports	Chevrolet	-*	-*	-*	-*	28.352	173.448
3	20	Matt Kenseth (i)	Joe Gibbs Racing	Toyota	-*	-*	-*	-*	28.408	173.106
4	5	Kevin Harvick (i)	JR Motorsports	Chevrolet	-*	-*	-*	-*	28.647	171.662
5	3	Ty Dillon (R)	Richard Childress Racing	Chevrolet	-*	-*	-*	-*	28.716	171.249
6	60	Chris Buescher (R)	Roush Fenway Racing	Ford	-*	-*	-*	-*	28.771	170.922
7	2	Brian Scott	Richard Childress Racing	Chevrolet	-*	-*	-*	-*	28.782	170.857
8	7	Regan Smith	JR Motorsports	Chevrolet	-*	-*	-*	-*	28.830	170.572
9	11	Elliott Sadler	Joe Gibbs Racing	Toyota	-*	-*	-*	-*	28.879	170.283
10	6	Trevor Bayne	Roush Fenway Racing	Ford	-*	-*	-*	-*	28.990	169.631
11	33	Cale Conley (i)	Richard Childress Racing	Chevrolet	-*	-*	-*	-*	29.113	168.914
12	42	Kyle Larson (i)	Turner Scott Motorsports	Chevrolet	-*	-*	-*	-*	37.223	132.112
Eliminated in Round 2
13	62	Brendan Gaughan	Richard Childress Racing	Chevrolet	-*	-*	28.955	169.836	-	-
14	39	Ryan Sieg (R)	RSS Racing	Chevrolet	-*	-*	28.963	169.789	-	-
15	22	Joey Logano (i)	Team Penske	Ford	-*	-*	29.005	169.543	-	-
16	01	Landon Cassill	JD Motorsports	Chevrolet	-*	-*	29.131	168.810	-	-
17	31	Dylan Kwasniewski (R)	Turner Scott Motorsports	Chevrolet	-*	-*	29.167	168.602	-	-
18	16	Ryan Reed (R)	Roush Fenway Racing	Ford	-*	-*	29.178	168.538	-	-
19	40	Josh Wise (i)	The Motorsports Group	Chevrolet	-*	-*	29.180	168.526	-	-
20	19	Mike Bliss	TriStar Motorsports	Toyota	-*	-*	29.203	168.394	-	-
21	51	Jeremy Clements	Jeremy Clements Racing	Chevrolet	-*	-*	29.297	167.853	-	-
22	99	James Buescher	RAB Racing	Toyota	-*	-*	29.363	167.476	-	-
23	28	J. J. Yeley	JGL Racing	Dodge	-*	-*	29.370	167.436	-	-
24	44	David Starr	TriStar Motorsports	Toyota	-*	-*	29.578	166.259	-	-
Eliminated in Round 1
25	43	Dakoda Armstrong (R)	Richard Petty Motorsports	Ford	29.512	166.631	-	-	-	-
26	4	Jeffrey Earnhardt	JD Motorsports	Chevrolet	29.532	166.518	-	-	-	-
27	93	Mike Wallace	JGL Racing	Dodge	29.562	166.349	-	-	-	-
28	17	Tanner Berryhill (R)	Vision Racing	Dodge	29.582	166.236	-	-	-	-
29	55	Todd Bodine (i)	Viva Motorsports	Chevrolet	29.589	166.197	-	-	-	-
30	14	Eric McClure	TriStar Motorsports	Toyota	29.679	165.693	-	-	-	-
31	87	Kevin Lepage	JD Motorsports	Chevrolet	29.802	165.009	-	-	-	-
32	52	Joey Gase	Jimmy Means Racing	Chevrolet	29.896	164.490	-	-	-	-
33	46	Matt DiBenedetto	The Motorsports Group	Chevrolet	30.041	163.696	-	-	-	-
34	76	Tommy Joe Martins (R)	Martins Motorsports	Dodge	30.084	163.462	-	-	-	-
35	70	Derrike Cope	Derrike Cope Racing	Chevrolet	30.395	161.790	-	-	-	-
36	23	Carlos Contreras	Rick Ware Racing	Chevrolet	30.579	160.816	-	-	-	-
37	13	Matt Carter	MBM Motorsports	Toyota	30.638	160.507	-	-	-	-
38	91	Jeff Green	TriStar Motorsports	Toyota	30.659	160.397	-	-	-	-
39	74	Mike Harmon	Mike Harmon Racing	Dodge	31.162	157.808	-	-	-	-
40	10	Blake Koch	TriStar Motorsports	Toyota	31.520	156.015	-	-	-	-
Official starting lineup

*Time not available.

== Race results ==
Fin	St	#	Driver	Team	Make	Laps	Led	Status	Pts	Winnings
1	2	9	Chase Elliott (R)	JR Motorsports	Chevrolet	147	52	running	47	$44,575
2	9	11	Elliott Sadler	Joe Gibbs Racing	Toyota	147	3	running	43	$33,350
3	3	20	Matt Kenseth (i)	Joe Gibbs Racing	Toyota	147	0	running	0	$19,700
4	1	54	Kyle Busch (i)	Joe Gibbs Racing	Toyota	147	84	running	0	$25,325
5	15	22	Joey Logano (i)	Team Penske	Ford	147	0	running	0	$15,775
6	12	42	Kyle Larson (i)	Turner Scott Motorsports	Chevrolet	147	2	running	0	$17,825
7	4	5	Kevin Harvick (i)	JR Motorsports	Chevrolet	147	5	running	0	$13,510
8	8	7	Regan Smith	JR Motorsports	Chevrolet	147	0	running	36	$20,370
9	10	6	Trevor Bayne	Roush Fenway Racing	Ford	147	0	running	35	$19,075
10	5	3	Ty Dillon (R)	Richard Childress Racing	Chevrolet	147	0	running	34	$20,100
11	7	2	Brian Scott	Richard Childress Racing	Chevrolet	147	0	running	33	$18,625
12	16	01	Landon Cassill	JD Motorsports	Chevrolet	147	0	running	32	$18,550
13	18	16	Ryan Reed (R)	Roush Fenway Racing	Ford	147	0	running	31	$18,500
14	23	28	J. J. Yeley	JGL Racing	Dodge	147	0	running	30	$18,450
15	19	40	Josh Wise (i)	The Motorsports Group	Chevrolet	147	0	running	0	$18,800
16	20	19	Mike Bliss	TriStar Motorsports	Toyota	147	0	running	28	$18,525
17	27	93	Mike Wallace	JGL Racing	Dodge	147	1	running	28	$18,425
18	25	43	Dakoda Armstrong (R)	Richard Petty Motorsports	Ford	147	0	running	26	$18,175
19	31	87	Kevin Lepage	JD Motorsports	Chevrolet	147	0	running	25	$18,125
20	26	4	Jeffrey Earnhardt	JD Motorsports	Chevrolet	147	0	running	24	$18,750
21	30	14	Eric McClure	TriStar Motorsports	Toyota	147	0	running	23	$18,000
22	13	62	Brendan Gaughan	Richard Childress Racing	Chevrolet	146	0	crash	22	$17,945
23	17	31	Dylan Kwasniewski (R)	Turner Scott Motorsports	Chevrolet	146	0	running	21	$17,895
24	36	23	Carlos Contreras	Rick Ware Racing	Chevrolet	145	0	running	20	$17,820
25	22	99	James Buescher	RAB Racing	Toyota	144	0	running	19	$18,250
26	32	52	Joey Gase	Jimmy Means Racing	Chevrolet	144	0	running	18	$17,695
27	28	17	Tanner Berryhill (R)	Vision Racing	Dodge	144	0	running	17	$17,645
28	29	55	Todd Bodine (i)	Viva Motorsports	Chevrolet	143	0	running	0	$17,570
29	35	70	Derrike Cope	Derrike Cope Racing	Chevrolet	141	0	running	15	$17,535
30	34	76	Tommy Joe Martins (R)	Martins Motorsports	Dodge	141	0	running	14	$11,795
31	21	51	Jeremy Clements	Jeremy Clements Racing	Chevrolet	137	0	running	13	$17,440
32	11	33	Cale Conley (i)	Richard Childress Racing	Chevrolet	136	0	running	0	$17,395
33	39	74	Mike Harmon	Mike Harmon Racing	Dodge	136	0	running	11	$17,370
34	6	60	Chris Buescher (R)	Roush Fenway Racing	Ford	119	0	running	10	$17,350
35	24	44	David Starr	TriStar Motorsports	Toyota	67	0	crash	9	$17,299
36	37	13	Matt Carter	MBM Motorsports	Toyota	30	0	rear gear	8	$10,520
37	14	39	Ryan Sieg (R)	RSS Racing	Chevrolet	16	0	crash	7	$16,500
38	33	46	Matt DiBenedetto	The Motorsports Group	Chevrolet	7	0	overheating	6	$10,426
39	38	91	Jeff Green	TriStar Motorsports	Toyota	6	0	brakes	5	$10,315
40	40	10	Blake Koch	TriStar Motorsports	Toyota	2	0	vibration	4	$10,290
Official race results

== Standings after the race ==
Drivers' Championship standings

	Pos	Driver	Points
	1	Chase Elliott	271
	2	Regan Smith	258 (-13)
1	3	Elliott Sadler	251 (-20)
1	4	Ty Dillon	248 (–23)
	5	Trevor Bayne	241 (–30)
1	6	Brian Scott	225 (–46)
1	7	Brendan Gaughan	215 (–56)
	8	Dylan Kwasniewski	200 (–71)
	9	James Buescher	195 (–76)
	10	Ryan Reed	172 (–99)
Official driver's standings

- Note: Only the first 10 positions are included for the driver standings.

Previous race: 2014 O'Reilly Auto Parts 300	NASCAR Nationwide Series; 2014 season	Next race: 2014 ToyotaCare 250
