= 2014 ToyotaCare 250 =

Eighth race of the 2014 NASCAR Nationwide Series

Race details
- Race 8 of 33 of the 2014 NASCAR Nationwide Series
- Date: April 25, 2014
- Official name: 27th Annual ToyotaCare 250
- Location: Richmond, Virginia, Richmond International Raceway
- Course: Permanent racing facility
- Course length: 0.75 miles (1.21 km)
- Distance: 250 laps, 187.5 mi (301.752 km)
- Scheduled distance: 250 laps, 187.5 mi (301.752 km)
- Average speed: 94.617 miles per hour (152.271 km/h)

Pole position
Driver	Brian Scott	Richard Childress Racing
- Time: 22.120

Most laps led
Driver	Kevin Harvick	JR Motorsports
- Laps: 202

Winner
No. 5	Kevin Harvick	JR Motorsports

Television in the United States
- Network: ESPNews
- Announcers: Allen Bestwick, Rusty Wallace, Andy Petree

Radio in the United States
- Radio: Motor Racing Network

The 2014 ToyotaCare 250 was the eighth stock car race of the 2014 NASCAR Nationwide Series season, and the 27th iteration of the event. The race was held on Friday, April 25, 2014, in Richmond, Virginia at Richmond Raceway, a 0.75 miles (1.21 km) D-shaped oval. The race took the scheduled 250 laps to complete. At race's end, JR Motorsports driver Kevin Harvick would manage to dominate the race to win his seventh career NASCAR Nationwide Series victory and his first of the season. To fill out the podium, Chase Elliott, driving for JR Motorsports, and Kyle Busch, driving for Joe Gibbs Racing, would finish second and third, respectively.

== Background ==
The layout of Richmond International Raceway, the venue where the race was at.

Richmond International Raceway (RIR) is a 3/4-mile (1.2 km), D-shaped, asphalt race track located just outside Richmond, Virginia in Henrico County. It hosts the Monster Energy NASCAR Cup Series and Xfinity Series. Known as "America's premier short track", it formerly hosted a NASCAR Camping World Truck Series race, an IndyCar Series race, and two USAC sprint car races.

=== Entry list ===
- (R) denotes rookie driver.
- (i) denotes driver who is ineligible for series driver points.

#	Driver	Team	Make	Sponsor
01	Landon Cassill	JD Motorsports	Chevrolet	G&K Services
2	Brian Scott	Richard Childress Racing	Chevrolet	Shore Lodge
3	Ty Dillon (R)	Richard Childress Racing	Chevrolet	WESCO
4	Jeffrey Earnhardt	JD Motorsports	Chevrolet	Perdue
5	Kevin Harvick (i)	JR Motorsports	Chevrolet	Tide
6	Trevor Bayne	Roush Fenway Racing	Ford	AdvoCare
7	Regan Smith	JR Motorsports	Chevrolet	Hellmann's, Kroger
9	Chase Elliott (R)	JR Motorsports	Chevrolet	NAPA Auto Parts
10	Jeff Green	TriStar Motorsports	Toyota	SupportMilitary.org
11	Elliott Sadler	Joe Gibbs Racing	Toyota	OneMain Financial
13	Derek White (i)	MBM Motorsports	Toyota	Headrush
14	Eric McClure	TriStar Motorsports	Toyota	Reynolds Wrap
16	Ryan Reed (R)	Roush Fenway Racing	Ford	Lilly Diabetes
17	Tanner Berryhill (R)	Vision Racing	Dodge	National Cash Lenders
19	Mike Bliss	TriStar Motorsports	Toyota	TriStar Motorsports
20	Daniel Suárez	Joe Gibbs Racing	Toyota	Telcel, Silent Circle
22	Ryan Blaney (i)	Team Penske	Ford	Discount Tire, SKF
23	Josh Reaume	Rick Ware Racing	Chevrolet	Lilly Trucking
28	J. J. Yeley	JGL Racing	Dodge	JGL Racing
31	Dylan Kwasniewski (R)	Turner Scott Motorsports	Chevrolet	SEM Products
33	Cale Conley (i)	Richard Childress Racing	Chevrolet	Okuma
39	Ryan Sieg (R)	RSS Racing	Chevrolet	RSS Racing
40	Josh Wise (i)	The Motorsports Group	Chevrolet	The Motorsports Group
42	Kyle Larson (i)	Turner Scott Motorsports	Chevrolet	Target Ticket
43	Dakoda Armstrong (R)	Richard Petty Motorsports	Ford	WinField United
44	Blake Koch	TriStar Motorsports	Toyota	K-Love Crisis Response Training
46	Matt DiBenedetto	The Motorsports Group	Chevrolet	The Motorsports Group
51	Jeremy Clements	Jeremy Clements Racing	Chevrolet	RepairableVehicles.com
52	Joey Gase	Jimmy Means Racing	Chevrolet	Donate Life
54	Kyle Busch (i)	Joe Gibbs Racing	Toyota	Monster Energy
55	Jimmy Weller III (i)	Viva Motorsports	Chevrolet	Genmak Geneva-Liberty Steel
60	Chris Buescher (R)	Roush Fenway Racing	Ford	Ford EcoBoost
62	Brendan Gaughan	Richard Childress Racing	Chevrolet	South Point Hotel, Casino & Spa
70	Derrike Cope	Derrike Cope Racing	Chevrolet	Youtheory
74	Mike Harmon	Mike Harmon Racing	Dodge	Mike Harmon Racing
76	Tommy Joe Martins (R)	Martins Motorsports	Dodge	Martins Motorsports
86	Joe Nemechek (i)	Deware Racing Group	Chevrolet	Bubba Burger
87	Kevin Lepage	JD Motorsports	Chevrolet	JD Motorsports
93	Mike Wallace	JGL Racing	Dodge	Old Dominion Truck Leasing
99	James Buescher	RAB Racing	Toyota	Rheem
Official entry list

== Practice ==
=== First practice ===
The first practice session was held on Thursday, April 24, at 1:00 PM EST. The session would last for one hour. Ryan Blaney, driving for Team Penske, would set the fastest time in the session, with a lap of 22.055 and an average speed of 122.421 miles per hour (197.018 km/h).

Pos.	#	Driver	Team	Make	Time	Speed
1	22	Ryan Blaney (i)	Team Penske	Ford	22.055	122.421
2	7	Regan Smith	JR Motorsports	Chevrolet	22.061	122.388
3	6	Trevor Bayne	Roush Fenway Racing	Ford	22.193	121.660
Full first practice results

=== Final practice ===
The final practice session, sometimes known as Happy Hour, was held on Thursday, April 24, at 2:30 PM EST. The session would last for one hour and 30 minutes. James Buescher, driving for RAB Racing, would set the fastest time in the session, with a lap of 22.169 and an average speed of 121.792 miles per hour (196.005 km/h).

Pos.	#	Driver	Team	Make	Time	Speed
1	99	James Buescher	RAB Racing	Toyota	22.169	121.792
2	6	Trevor Bayne	Roush Fenway Racing	Ford	22.219	121.518
3	60	Chris Buescher (R)	Roush Fenway Racing	Ford	22.247	121.365
Full Happy Hour practice results

== Qualifying ==
Qualifying was held on Friday, April 25, at 3:10 PM EST. Since Richmond International Raceway is under 1.25 miles (2.01 km) in length, the qualifying system was a multi-car system that included two rounds. The first round was 30 minutes, where every driver would be able to set a lap within the 30 minutes. Then, the second round would consist of the fastest 12 drivers in round 1, and drivers would have 10 minutes to set a time. Whoever set the fastest time in round 2 would win the pole.

Brian Scott, driving for Richard Childress Racing, would win the pole, setting a time of 22.120 and an average speed of 122.061 miles per hour (196.438 km/h) in the second round.

No drivers would fail to qualify.

=== Full qualifying results ===
Pos.	#	Driver	Team	Make	Time (R1)	Speed (R1)	Time (R2)	Speed (R2)
1	2	Brian Scott	Richard Childress Racing	Chevrolet	-*	-*	22.120	122.061
2	31	Dylan Kwasniewski (R)	Turner Scott Motorsports	Chevrolet	-*	-*	22.153	121.880
3	22	Ryan Blaney (i)	Team Penske	Ford	-*	-*	22.160	121.841
4	9	Chase Elliott (R)	JR Motorsports	Chevrolet	-*	-*	22.209	121.572
5	6	Trevor Bayne	Roush Fenway Racing	Ford	-*	-*	22.229	121.463
6	7	Regan Smith	JR Motorsports	Chevrolet	-*	-*	22.322	120.957
7	60	Chris Buescher (R)	Roush Fenway Racing	Ford	-*	-*	22.322	120.957
8	54	Kyle Busch (i)	Joe Gibbs Racing	Toyota	-*	-*	22.326	120.935
9	5	Kevin Harvick (i)	JR Motorsports	Chevrolet	-*	-*	22.345	120.832
10	01	Landon Cassill	JD Motorsports	Chevrolet	-*	-*	22.474	120.139
11	3	Ty Dillon (R)	Richard Childress Racing	Chevrolet	-*	-*	22.477	120.123
12	20	Daniel Suárez	Joe Gibbs Racing	Toyota	-*	-*	22.603	119.453
Eliminated in Round 1
13	11	Elliott Sadler	Joe Gibbs Racing	Toyota	22.327	120.930	-	-
14	42	Kyle Larson (i)	Turner Scott Motorsports	Chevrolet	22.357	120.768	-	-
15	99	James Buescher	RAB Racing	Toyota	22.364	120.730	-	-
16	39	Ryan Sieg (R)	RSS Racing	Chevrolet	22.387	120.606	-	-
17	33	Cale Conley (i)	Richard Childress Racing	Chevrolet	22.420	120.428	-	-
18	19	Mike Bliss	TriStar Motorsports	Toyota	22.446	120.289	-	-
19	43	Dakoda Armstrong (R)	Richard Petty Motorsports	Ford	22.482	120.096	-	-
20	16	Ryan Reed (R)	Roush Fenway Racing	Ford	22.493	120.037	-	-
21	40	Josh Wise (i)	The Motorsports Group	Chevrolet	22.508	119.957	-	-
22	62	Brendan Gaughan	Richard Childress Racing	Chevrolet	22.516	119.915	-	-
23	17	Tanner Berryhill (R)	Vision Racing	Dodge	22.664	119.132	-	-
24	46	Matt DiBenedetto	The Motorsports Group	Chevrolet	22.673	119.084	-	-
25	4	Jeffrey Earnhardt	JD Motorsports	Chevrolet	22.696	118.964	-	-
26	86	Joe Nemechek (i)	Deware Racing Group	Chevrolet	22.698	118.953	-	-
27	44	Blake Koch	TriStar Motorsports	Toyota	22.719	118.843	-	-
28	51	Jeremy Clements	Jeremy Clements Racing	Chevrolet	22.731	118.781	-	-
29	93	Mike Wallace	JGL Racing	Dodge	22.750	118.681	-	-
30	87	Kevin Lepage	JD Motorsports	Chevrolet	22.757	118.645	-	-
31	52	Joey Gase	Jimmy Means Racing	Chevrolet	22.789	118.478	-	-
32	14	Eric McClure	TriStar Motorsports	Toyota	22.792	118.463	-	-
33	28	J. J. Yeley	JGL Racing	Dodge	22.798	118.431	-	-
34	55	Jimmy Weller III (i)	Viva Motorsports	Chevrolet	22.853	118.146	-	-
35	70	Derrike Cope	Derrike Cope Racing	Chevrolet	22.917	117.816	-	-
36	10	Jeff Green	TriStar Motorsports	Toyota	23.026	117.259	-	-
37	23	Josh Reaume	Rick Ware Racing	Chevrolet	23.134	116.711	-	-
38	13	Derek White (i)	MBM Motorsports	Toyota	23.163	116.565	-	-
39	74	Mike Harmon	Mike Harmon Racing	Dodge	23.866	113.132	-	-
40	76	Tommy Joe Martins (R)	Martins Motorsports	Dodge	23.904	112.952	-	-
Official starting lineup

*Time not available.

== Race results ==
Fin	St	#	Driver	Team	Make	Laps	Led	Status	Pts	Winnings
1	9	5	Kevin Harvick (i)	JR Motorsports	Chevrolet	250	202	running	0	$42,450
2	4	9	Chase Elliott (R)	JR Motorsports	Chevrolet	250	0	running	42	$35,950
3	8	54	Kyle Busch (i)	Joe Gibbs Racing	Toyota	250	0	running	0	$22,475
4	14	42	Kyle Larson (i)	Turner Scott Motorsports	Chevrolet	250	0	running	0	$21,675
5	1	2	Brian Scott	Richard Childress Racing	Chevrolet	250	45	running	40	$30,375
6	13	11	Elliott Sadler	Joe Gibbs Racing	Toyota	250	1	running	39	$23,225
7	7	60	Chris Buescher (R)	Roush Fenway Racing	Ford	250	0	running	37	$22,885
8	6	7	Regan Smith	JR Motorsports	Chevrolet	250	0	running	36	$23,395
9	3	22	Ryan Blaney (i)	Team Penske	Ford	250	0	running	0	$21,875
10	15	99	James Buescher	RAB Racing	Toyota	250	0	running	34	$22,925
11	5	6	Trevor Bayne	Roush Fenway Racing	Ford	250	0	running	33	$21,425
12	20	16	Ryan Reed (R)	Roush Fenway Racing	Ford	250	0	running	32	$21,325
13	10	01	Landon Cassill	JD Motorsports	Chevrolet	250	0	running	31	$21,225
14	11	3	Ty Dillon (R)	Richard Childress Racing	Chevrolet	250	0	running	30	$21,175
15	17	33	Cale Conley (i)	Richard Childress Racing	Chevrolet	250	0	running	0	$15,750
16	18	19	Mike Bliss	TriStar Motorsports	Toyota	249	0	running	28	$21,025
17	19	43	Dakoda Armstrong (R)	Richard Petty Motorsports	Ford	249	0	running	27	$20,825
18	33	28	J. J. Yeley	JGL Racing	Dodge	249	0	running	26	$20,725
19	12	20	Daniel Suárez	Joe Gibbs Racing	Toyota	249	0	running	25	$20,850
20	22	62	Brendan Gaughan	Richard Childress Racing	Chevrolet	249	0	running	24	$21,300
21	27	44	Blake Koch	TriStar Motorsports	Toyota	248	0	running	23	$20,550
22	28	51	Jeremy Clements	Jeremy Clements Racing	Chevrolet	247	2	running	23	$20,470
23	26	86	Joe Nemechek (i)	Deware Racing Group	Chevrolet	246	0	running	0	$14,395
24	25	4	Jeffrey Earnhardt	JD Motorsports	Chevrolet	246	0	running	20	$20,320
25	21	40	Josh Wise (i)	The Motorsports Group	Chevrolet	246	0	running	0	$20,395
26	16	39	Ryan Sieg (R)	RSS Racing	Chevrolet	246	0	running	18	$20,545
27	29	93	Mike Wallace	JGL Racing	Dodge	245	0	running	17	$20,145
28	35	70	Derrike Cope	Derrike Cope Racing	Chevrolet	245	0	running	16	$14,070
29	32	14	Eric McClure	TriStar Motorsports	Toyota	245	0	running	15	$20,020
30	37	23	Josh Reaume	Rick Ware Racing	Chevrolet	244	0	running	14	$20,270
31	31	52	Joey Gase	Jimmy Means Racing	Chevrolet	239	0	running	13	$19,895
32	2	31	Dylan Kwasniewski (R)	Turner Scott Motorsports	Chevrolet	187	0	crash	12	$19,835
33	39	74	Mike Harmon	Mike Harmon Racing	Dodge	112	0	vibration	11	$19,795
34	38	13	Derek White (i)	MBM Motorsports	Toyota	58	0	rear gear	0	$13,685
35	23	17	Tanner Berryhill (R)	Vision Racing	Dodge	27	0	transmission	9	$19,606
36	40	76	Tommy Joe Martins (R)	Martins Motorsports	Dodge	11	0	suspension	8	$12,650
37	24	46	Matt DiBenedetto	The Motorsports Group	Chevrolet	6	0	electrical	7	$12,590
38	36	10	Jeff Green	TriStar Motorsports	Toyota	5	0	vibration	6	$12,536
39	30	87	Kevin Lepage	JD Motorsports	Chevrolet	2	0	crash	5	$18,420
40	34	55	Jimmy Weller III (i)	Viva Motorsports	Chevrolet	1	0	engine	0	$18,380
Official race results

== Standings after the race ==
Drivers' Championship standings

	Pos	Driver	Points
	1	Chase Elliott	313
	2	Regan Smith	294 (-19)
	3	Elliott Sadler	290 (-23)
	4	Ty Dillon	278 (–35)
	5	Trevor Bayne	274 (–39)
	6	Brian Scott	265 (–48)
	7	Brendan Gaughan	239 (–74)
1	8	James Buescher	229 (–84)
1	9	Dylan Kwasniewski	212 (–101)
	10	Ryan Reed	204 (–109)
Official driver's standings

- Note: Only the first 10 positions are included for the driver standings.

Previous race: 2014 VFW Sport Clips Help a Hero 200	NASCAR Nationwide Series; 2014 season	Next race: 2014 Aaron's 312
