= Cale Conley =

American racing driver (born 1992)

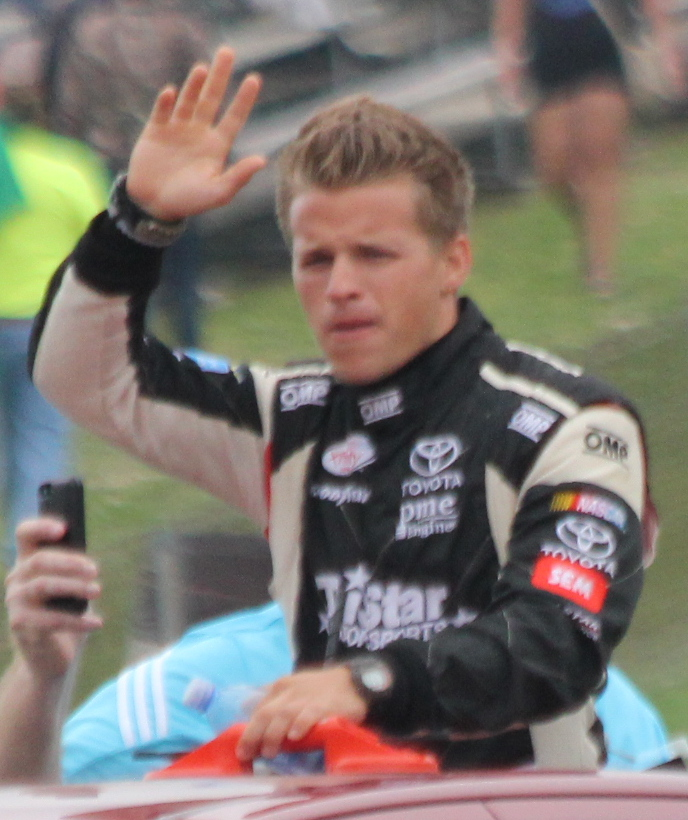
- Conley at Road America in 2015
- Born: May 13, 1992 (age 34); Vienna, West Virginia, U.S.

NASCAR O'Reilly Auto Parts Series career
- 42 races run over 3 years
- 2017 position: 75th
- Best finish: 20th (2015)
- First race: 2014 Drive to Stop Diabetes 300 (Bristol)
- Last race: 2017 Hisense 4K TV 300 (Charlotte)
Wins	Top tens	Poles
0	1	0
- Statistics up to date as of May 27, 2017.

Cale Conley (born May 13, 1992) is an American former professional stock car racing driver.

== Racing career ==
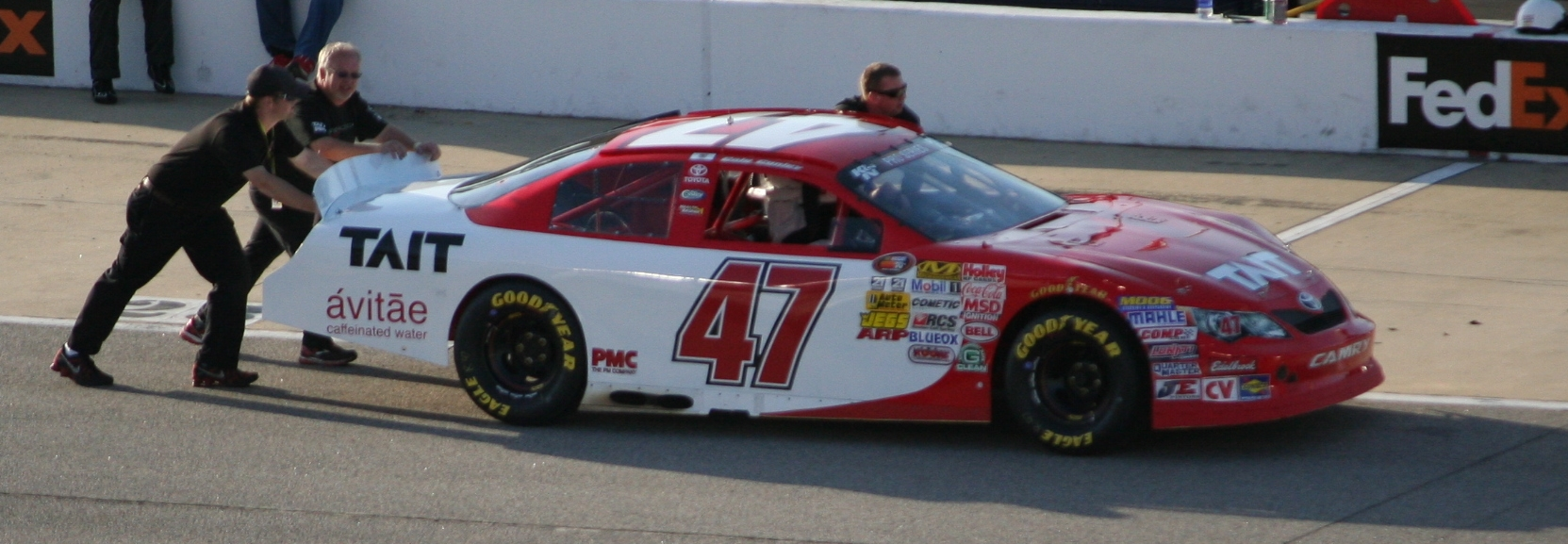
Conley's No. 47 East Series car for his family team in 2013 at Richmond

Conley began in go-karts at the age of five, working his way through quarter midgets, open-wheel racing and sprint cars, including World of Outlaws and USAC competition. Conley debuted in the NASCAR K&N Pro Series East in 2011, with his first win coming in 2012 at Columbus Motor Speedway after leading all 150 laps. He competed full-time in the East series in 2013, scoring four top-five finishes.

In February 2014, Conley joined the No. 33 of Richard Childress Racing in the Nationwide Series on a part-time basis, working with crew chief Nick Harrison. Conley was signed to run ten total races. He made his debut at Bristol Motor Speedway in March. Conley started 12th and finished a strong 11th in his debut, after battling from being a lap down. Conley finished 15th at Richmond in April. In July, Conley ran a 160-lap tire test in an RCR Sprint Cup Series car at Nashville Superspeedway. Also in July, Conley announced his support for sponsor IAVA's (Iraq and Afghanistan Veterans of America) "Convoy to Combat Suicide" along with music artists Lady Gaga and Linkin Park.

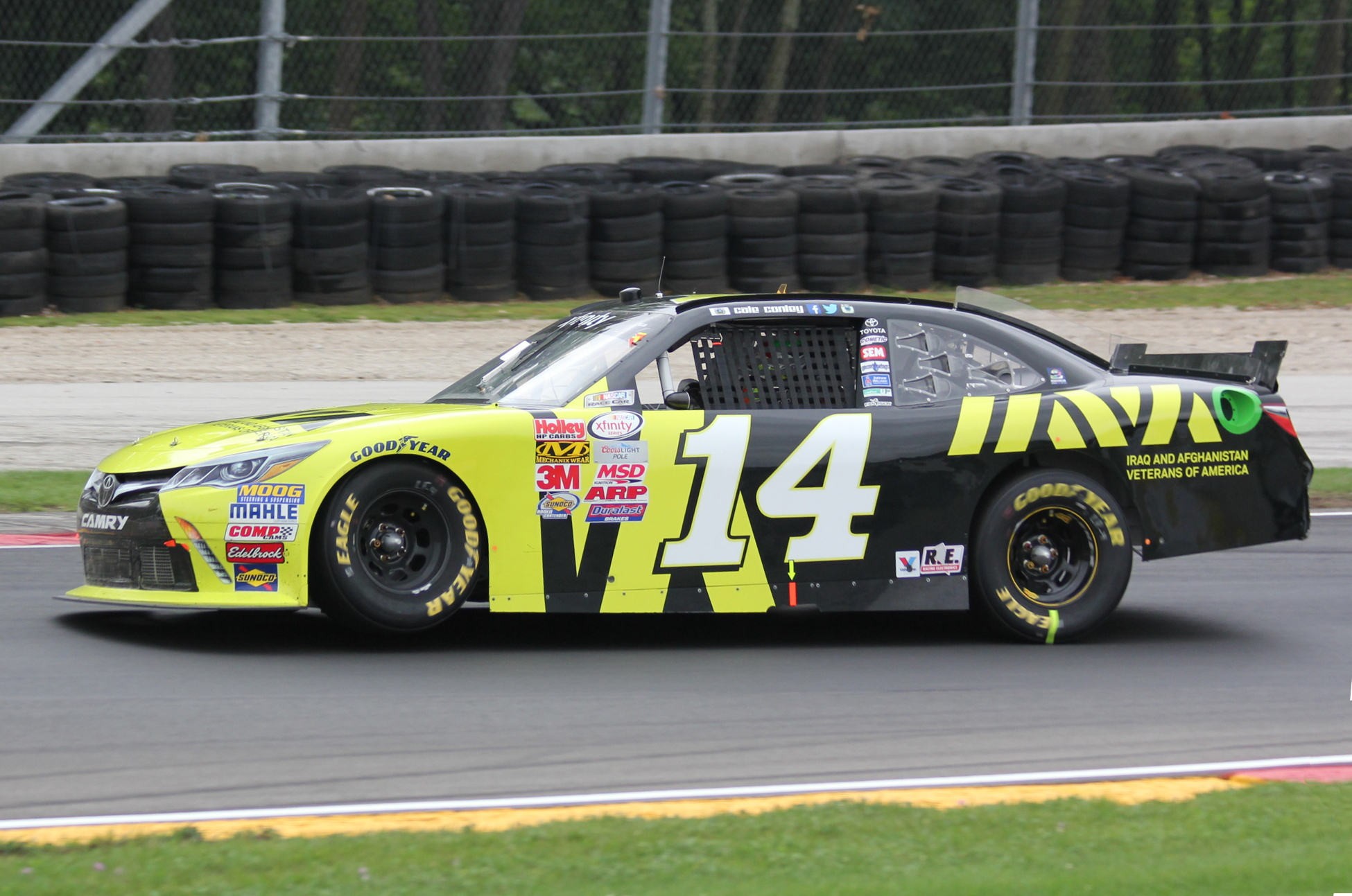
Conley's No. 14 Xfinity Series car for TriStar Motorsports in 2015 at Road America

For 2015, Conley signed with TriStar Motorsports to drive their No. 14 Toyota Camry full-time, running for Rookie of the Year. However, after 30 races, Conley announced that he would not complete the remainder of the season due to a lack of funding.

After being without a ride for the entire 2016 season, Conley joined JGL Racing's "Young Guns Program" in 2017 to drive the No. 24 Camry part-time starting at Charlotte. However, that ended up being his only race in the car all year, and he was without a ride again after that and has not raced in NASCAR ever since.

== Personal life ==
Conley was born and raised in Vienna West Virginia and graduated from Parkersburg high school in 2010. On August 2, 2018, Conley married Emma Blaney, the sister of driver Ryan Blaney. On January 12, 2019 Cale and Emma had their first child, Louie. Later on March 5, 2021 they had their second child, Bodhi.

== Motorsports career results ==
=== NASCAR ===
(key) (Bold – Pole position awarded by qualifying time. Italics – Pole position earned by points standings or practice time. * – Most laps led. ** – All laps led.)

==== Xfinity Series ====
NASCAR Xfinity Series results
Year	Team	No.	Make	1	2	3	4	5	6	7	8	9	10	11	12	13	14	15	16	17	18	19	20	21	22	23	24	25	26	27	28	29	30	31	32	33	NXSC	Pts	Ref
2014	Richard Childress Racing	33	Chevy	DAY	PHO	LVS	BRI; 11	CAL	TEX	DAR; 32	RCH; 17	TAL	IOW; 30	CLT	DOV; 31	MCH	ROA	KEN	DAY	NHA	CHI; 12	IND	IOW	GLN	MOH	BRI; 15	ATL	RCH; 17	CHI	KEN; 6	DOV; 11	KAN	CLT; 33	TEX	PHO	HOM	91st	0^{1}	
2015	TriStar Motorsports	14	Toyota	DAY; 30	ATL; 35	LVS; 25	PHO; 22	CAL; 16	TEX; 34	BRI; 19	RCH; 25	TAL; 24	IOW; 19	CLT; 34	DOV; 33	MCH; 26	CHI; 20	DAY; 32	KEN; 29	NHA; 21	IND; 21	IOW; 23	GLN; 21	MOH; 20	BRI; 18	ROA; 37	DAR; 19	RCH; 22	CHI; 33	KEN; 16	DOV; 29	CLT; 26	KAN; 30	TEX	PHO	HOM	20th	561	
2017	JGL Racing	24	Toyota	DAY	ATL	LVS	PHO	CAL	TEX	BRI	RCH	TAL	CLT; 32	DOV	POC	MCH	IOW	DAY	KEN	NHA	IND	IOW	GLN	MOH	BRI	ROA	DAR	RCH	CHI	KEN	DOV	CLT	KAN	TEX	PHO	HOM	75th	5	

^{*} Season still in progress
^{1} Ineligible for series points

==== K&N Pro Series East ====
NASCAR K&N Pro Series East results
Year	Team	No.	Make	1	2	3	4	5	6	7	8	9	10	11	12	13	14	15	16	NKNPSEC	Pts	Ref
2011	Conley Motorsports	27	Chevy	GRE; 24	SBO; 21	RCH; 17	IOW; DNQ	BGS; 19	JFC; 19	LGY; 16	NHA; 23	COL; 18	GRE; 19	NHA; 23	DOV					19th	1097	
2012	Conley Motorsports	47	Toyota	BRI	GRE; 28	RCH	IOW; 3	BGS	**JFC**; 2*	LGY	CNB	COL; 1**	**IOW**; 7	NHA; 35	DOV; 24	GRE; DNS	CAR; 25			19th	235	
2013	Conley Motorsports	47	Toyota	BRI; 13	GRE; 14	FIF; 18	RCH; 29	BGS; 19	IOW; 5	LGY; 4	COL; 2	IOW; 20	VIR; 6	GRE; 22	NHA; 3	**DOV**; 17	RAL; 20			12th	426	
2014	Conley Motorsports	47	Chevy	NSM	DAY	BRI; 30	GRE	RCH	IOW	BGS	FIF	LGY	NHA; 3	COL	IOW; 23	GLN	VIR	GRE	DOV	34th	76	

==== K&N Pro Series West ====
NASCAR K&N Pro Series West results
Year	Team	No.	Make	1	2	3	4	5	6	7	8	9	10	11	12	13	14	15	NKNPSWC	Pts	Ref
2012	Conley Motorsports	47	Toyota	PHO	LHC	MMP	S99	IOW	BIR	LVS	SON	EVG	CNS	IOW	PIR	SMP	AAS	**PHO**; 3	53rd	41	
