= Ryan Sieg =

American racing driver (born 1987)

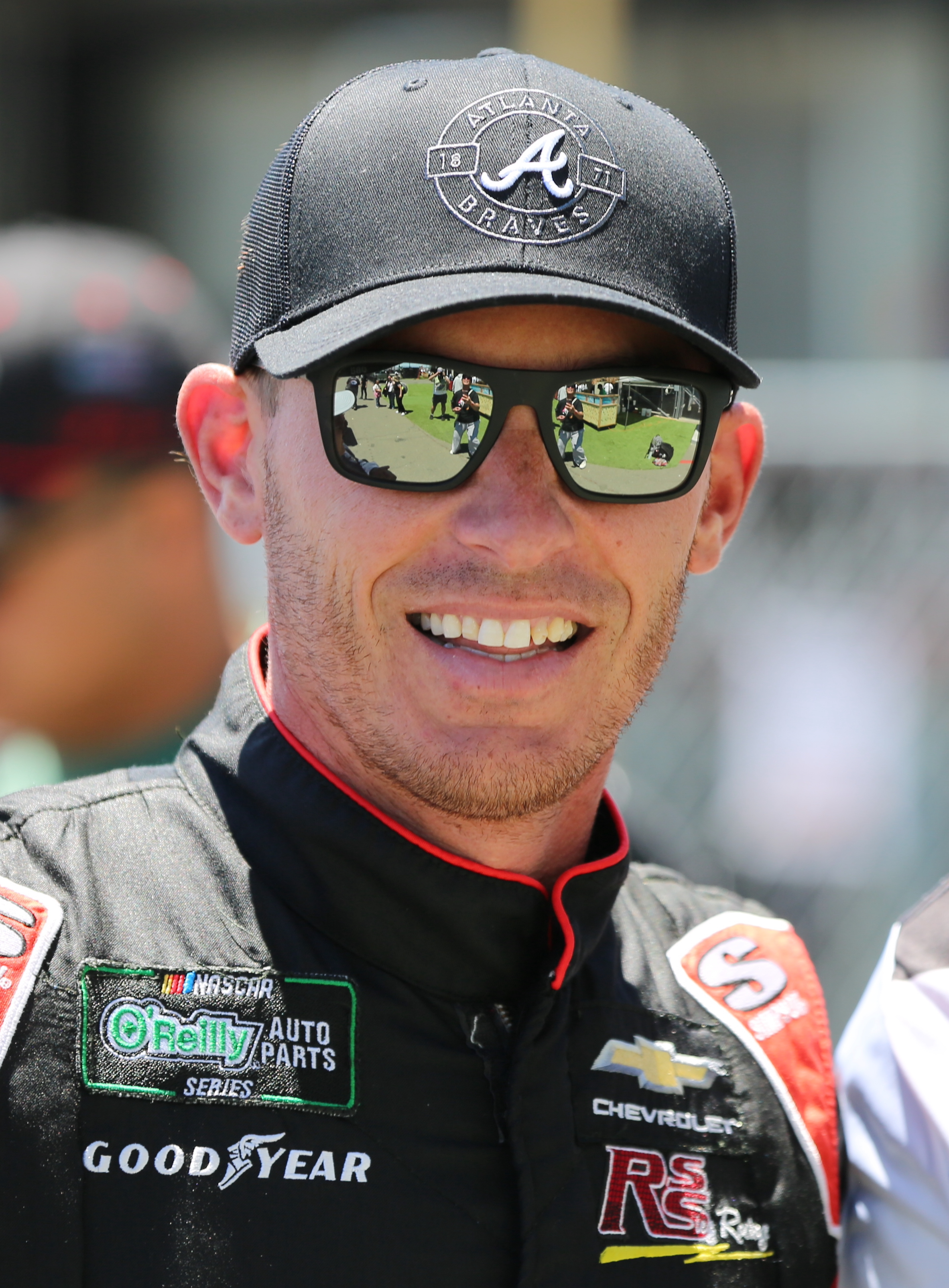
- Sieg at Sonoma Raceway in 2026
- Born: Ryan Scott Sieg; June 20, 1987 (age 39); Tucker, Georgia, U.S.

NASCAR Cup Series career
- 6 races run over 2 years
- 2019 position: 51st
- Best finish: 51st (2019)
- First race: 2017 AAA 400 Drive for Autism (Dover)
- Last race: 2019 Brickyard 400 (Indianapolis)
Wins	Top tens	Poles
0	0	0

NASCAR O'Reilly Auto Parts Series career
- 433 races run over 14 years
- Car no., team: No. 39 (RSS Racing)
- 2026 position: 15th
- Best finish: 9th (2016)
- First race: 2013 Dollar General 200 (Phoenix)
- Last race: 2026 O'Reilly Auto Parts 300 (Homestead)
- First win: 2026 Winn-Dixie 250 (Daytona)
Wins	Top tens	Poles
1	82	1

NASCAR FedEx Freight Truck Series career
- 108 races run over 8 years
- 2019 position: 104th
- Best finish: 15th (2010, 2012)
- First race: 2009 Kroger 250 (Martinsville)
- Last race: 2019 UNOH 200 (Bristol)
Wins	Top tens	Poles
0	7	0
- Statistics up to date as of November 7, 2026.

Ryan Scott Sieg (born June 20, 1987) is an American professional stock car racing driver and team owner. He competes full-time in the NASCAR O'Reilly Auto Parts Series, driving the No. 39 Chevrolet SS for RSS Racing. He is the younger brother of the late former driver Shane Sieg and the older brother of current teammate Kyle Sieg.

== Racing career ==
=== Gander Outdoors Truck Series ===
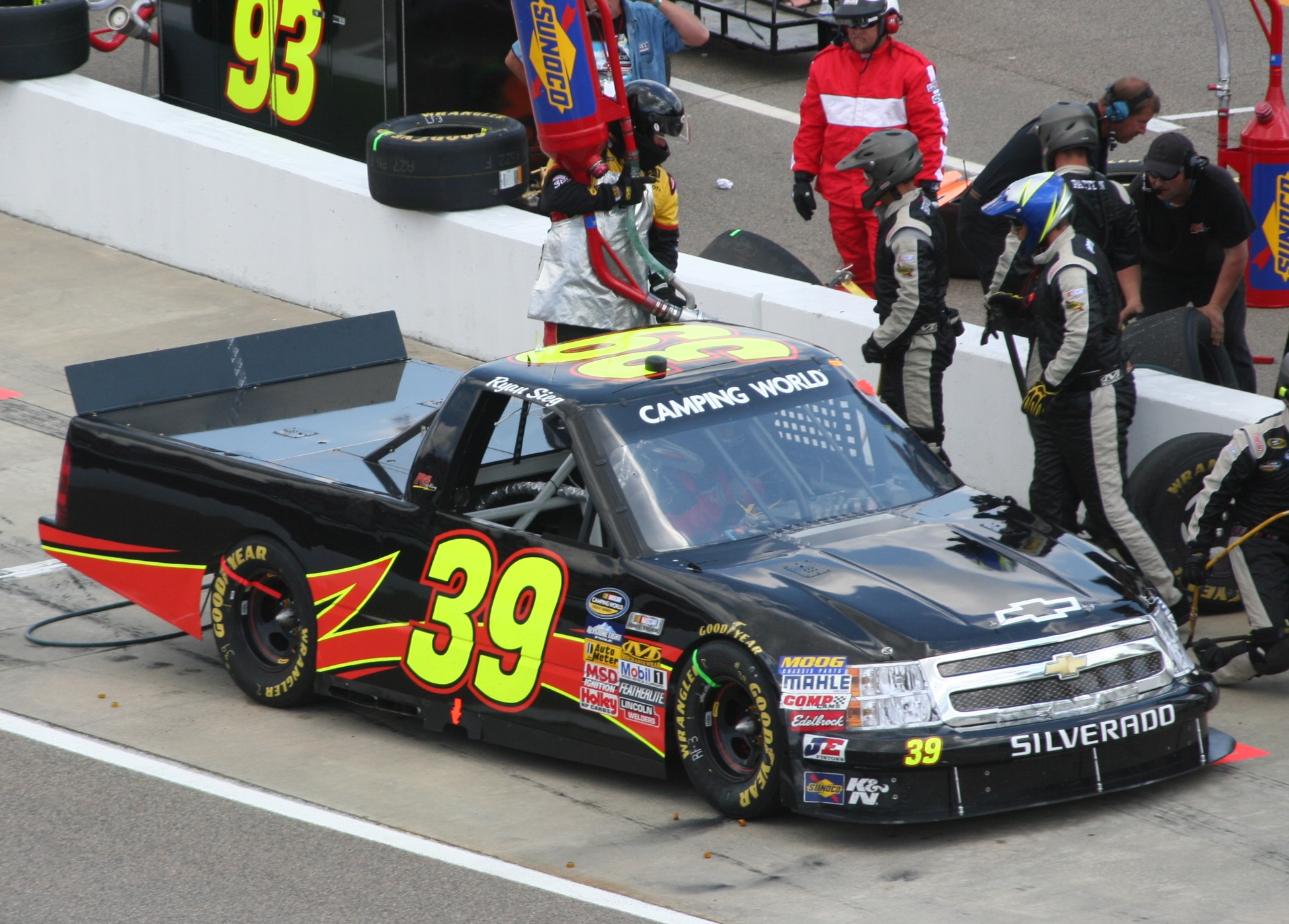
Sieg at Rockingham Speedway in 2012

Sieg made his NASCAR debut in 2009, competing in the Camping World Truck Series Kroger 250 at Martinsville Speedway. Driving the No. 21 Dodge for GunBroker Racing, Sieg started 16th but finished 34th due to an ignition problem. At The Milwaukee Mile, he would start a partial schedule for his family-owned race team. In nine races, Ryan recorded six top-twenty finishes, including a finish of ninth at Gateway International Raceway.

For 2010, Sieg and his brother Shane both planned to run the full Truck Series schedule in the No. 39 and No. 93 trucks, respectively. Despite having no major sponsorship, Sieg was able to run the entire season, finishing 21 of the 25 races and earning two top-ten finishes, including an eighth at Kentucky Speedway and a ninth at Dover International Speedway.

On June 10, 2011, Sieg finished seventh in the WinStar World Casino 400K at Texas Motor Speedway, marking his best career finish in his 44th start in the Camping World Truck Series. He also led ten laps earlier after staying out on a pit stop. At the September 2 Truck Series race at Atlanta Motor Speedway, he piloted his No. 39 RSS Racing Chevy to a fifteenth-place finish.

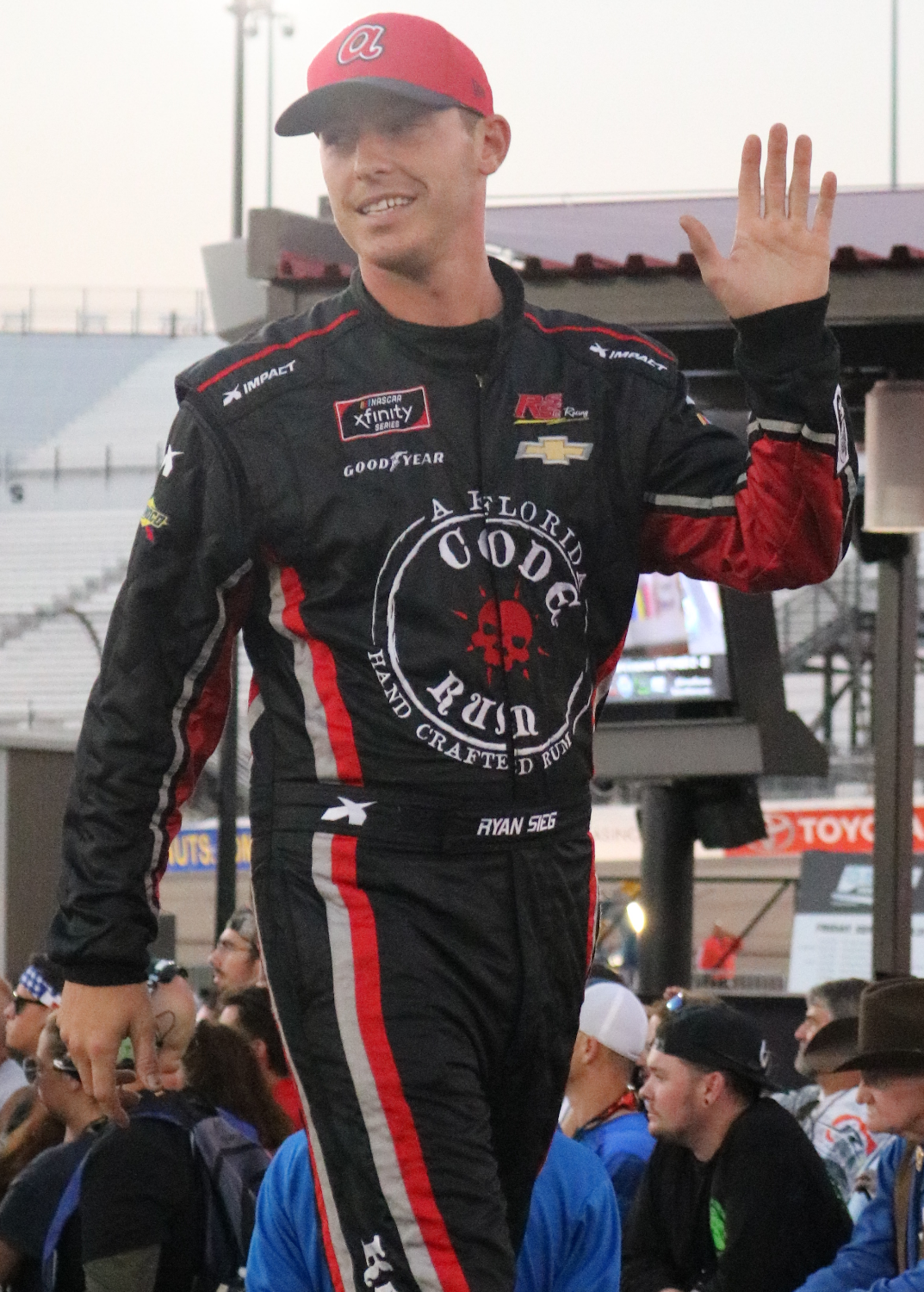
Sieg at Richmond Raceway in 2018

For 2012, Sieg led six laps at the Charlotte Motor Speedway race after staying out on a pit stop during a caution. He ran the final three laps in third position before finishing in fifteenth after running out of fuel on the last lap at Michigan International Speedway on August 18, marking his best final-laps position in the Camping World Truck Series. He would later score a sixth-place finish at Phoenix.

In 2013, in addition to running the full Camping World Truck Series season, Sieg substituted for Jeremy Clements in the NASCAR Nationwide Series during the latter's suspension. Later in the year, he ran at the Indianapolis Motor Speedway in the Indiana 250 for his own team.

In 2019, Sieg returned to the Truck Series for the JEGS 200 at Dover, driving the No. 33 Chevrolet for Reaume Brothers Racing. After starting last in 32nd, he finished sixteenth.

=== O'Reilly Auto Parts Series ===
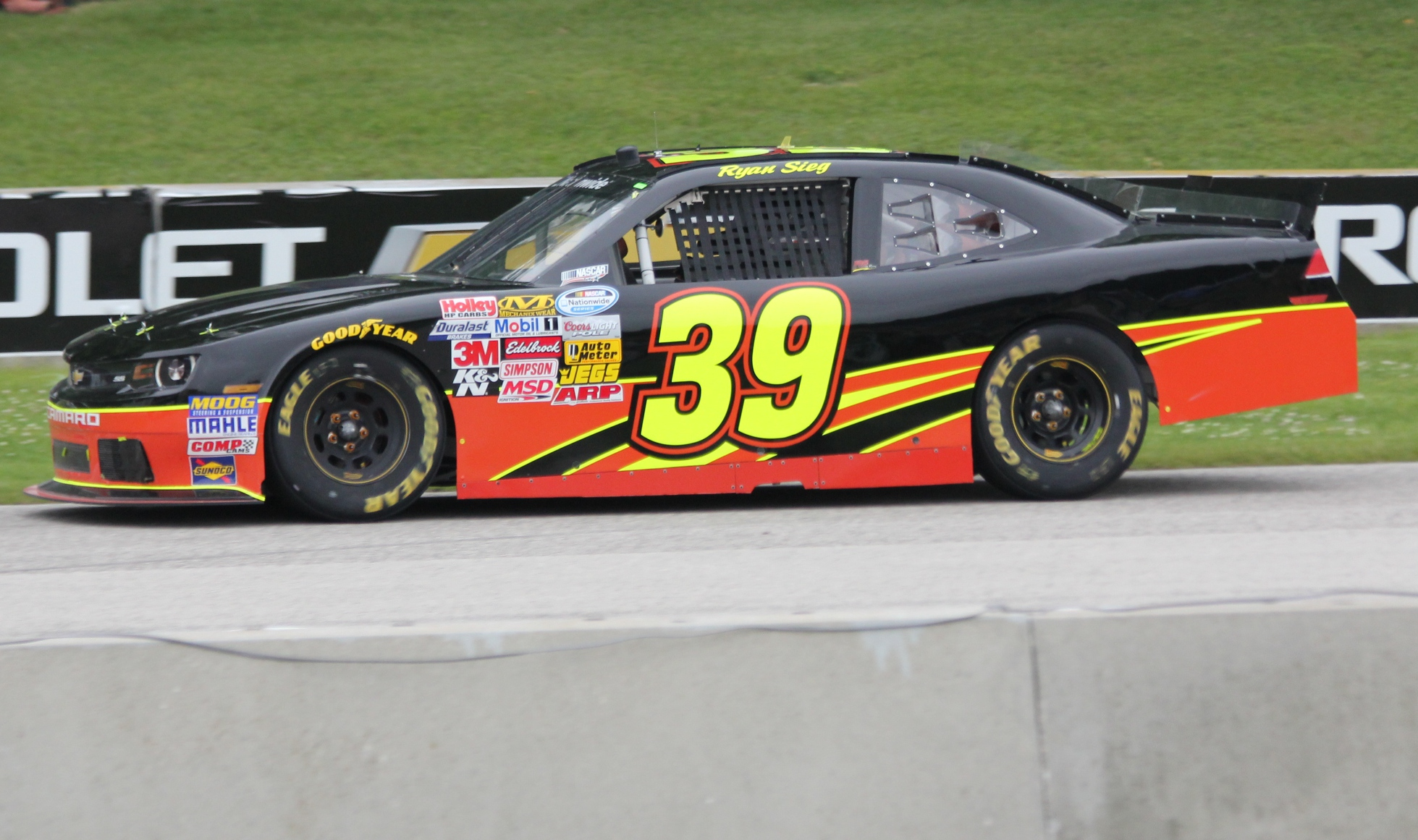
Sieg racing at Road America in 2014

In February 2014, RSS Racing announced that Sieg would run the full Truck Series season and at least the first five Nationwide Series races in 2014. He finished in the ninth spot in the season-opening DRIVE4COPD 300 at Daytona International Speedway, his first top-ten in the Nationwide Series. After Fontana, it was announced that Sieg would focus his efforts on the Nationwide Series for the remainder of the season, running for Rookie of the Year. Sieg then earned fame himself at the July race at Daytona when he drafted Kasey Kahne past teammate Regan Smith to his first Nationwide victory since 2007. In doing so, he also scored his first career top-five finish with a third-place finish, enough to put him in the first of four races in the 2014 Nationwide Dash 4 Cash event the next week at New Hampshire. Sieg was rather impressive in 2014, having some other solid runs to go along with the two top-tens to finish the season sixteenth in points.

In 2015, Sieg returned to the Xfinity Series with a new sponsor Uncle Bob's Self Storage at the season opener at Daytona. He finished 38th after being involved in the first big one. Sieg had a consistent season with finishing many races under twentieth, including an eighth-place finish at Kansas, finishing 11th in points. Sieg lost the sponsorship from Uncle Bob's for 2016, but a number of sponsors filled the void. Some highlights of the season included almost qualifying for the Dash 4 Cash at Dover International Speedway, running in the top five at Daytona International Speedway, and qualifying for the inaugural Xfinity Series Chase before being knocked out after the first round.

In June 2017, Sieg recorded his best career Xfinity finish of second at Iowa Speedway. Later in the season, Sieg's Xfinity throwback car for Darlington Raceway honored Ryan's brother Shane Sieg, who had died two weekends prior.

On January 24, 2018, Sieg announced another full season with RSS Racing. After a sixth-place run at Talladega Superspeedway in the spring, Sieg qualified for the Xfinity Series Dash 4 Cash at Dover International Speedway after Spencer Gallagher's eligibility was stripped. A pit road penalty during the race prevented Sieg from making it any farther in the D4C. Sieg's efforts received a boost in 2018 with the addition of two start and park cars that RSS Racing also fielded to help fund Sieg's efforts in the No. 39.

On December 27, 2018, Sieg announced another full Xfinity season with RSS Racing, intending to make the playoffs for the first time since 2016. After scoring his second top-five of the year at the spring Richmond Raceway event, Sieg sat ninth in the point standings. He credited new crew chief Shane Wilson and new cars from Richard Childress Racing as catalysts for the uptick in performance.

In September 2019, Sieg finished 14th in the Rhino Pro Truck Outfitters 300 at Las Vegas but was disqualified after his car failed post-race inspection for not meeting the minimum ride height. Nevertheless, he qualified for the Xfinity playoffs, and the disqualification did not affect his standing points.

After a 2020 season that saw Sieg record a career-best seven top-five finishes and reach the playoffs' Round of 8 before finishing tenth in points, RSS Racing switched to Ford for 2021.

During the spring 2022 Las Vegas race, Sieg lost control of his car and hit the outside wall after light contact from Ty Gibbs. Both drivers discussed the incident during a red flag delay. Once the race resumed, NASCAR black-flagged Sieg for not reaching the minimum speed, but instead of returning to pit road, he attempted to wreck Gibbs, but he ended up spinning and damaging Sheldon Creed and Brett Moffitt's cars before returning to the garage. Following a tenth place finish and accidents to Creed and Landon Cassill at the fall 2022 Bristol race, Sieg was able to advance to the Xfinity Series Playoffs. Despite three top-ten finishes in the Round of 12, Sieg was eliminated from the Xfinity Playoffs. He would ultimately finish eleventh in the points standings.

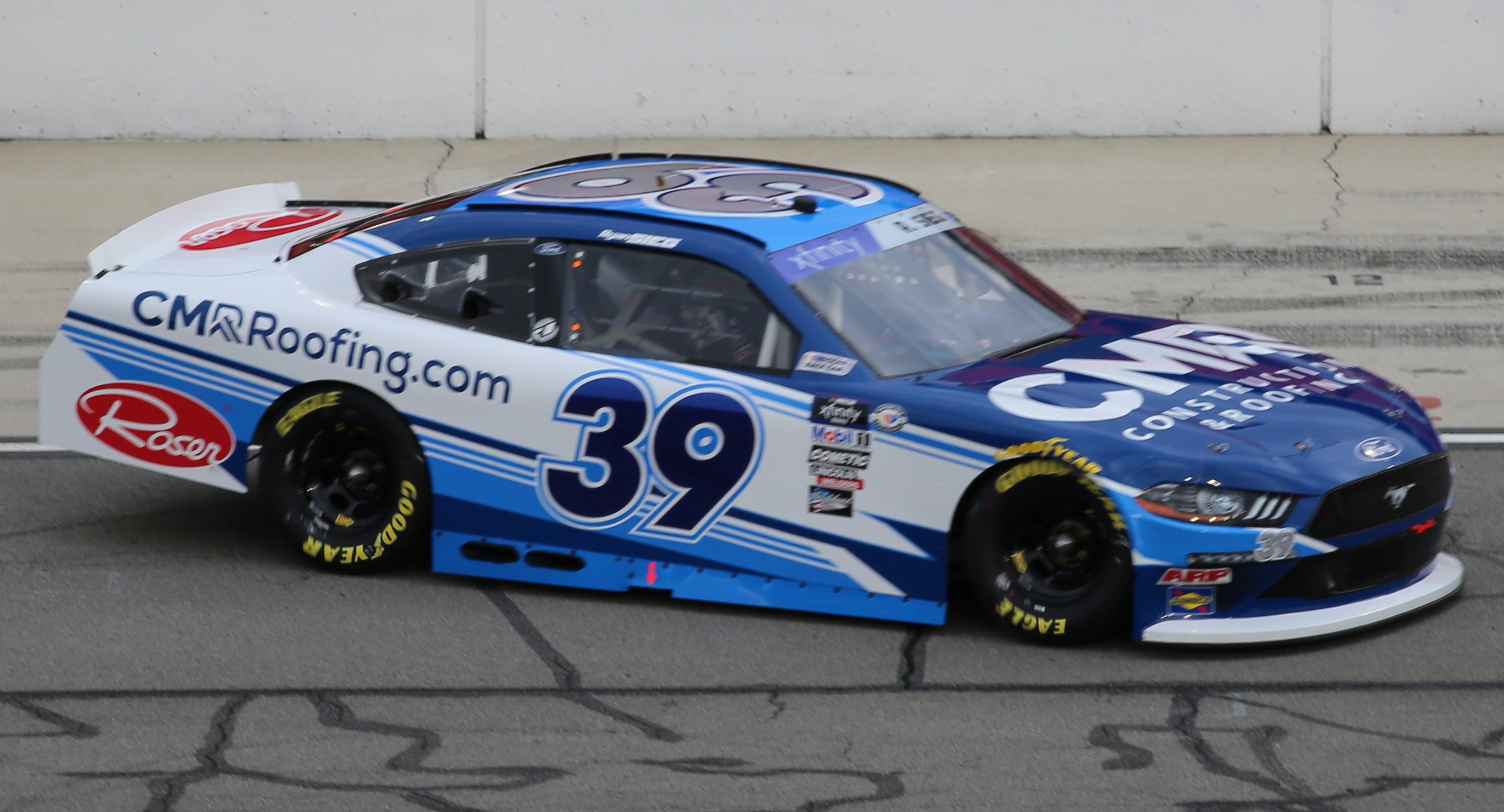
Sieg at Auto Club Speedway in 2023

Sieg began the 2023 season by finishing eighth at Daytona. He struggled throughout much of the regular season, only scoring two more top ten finishes at Richmond and the summer Daytona race. As a result, Sieg failed to qualify for the 2023 playoffs.

Sieg started the 2024 season with a 22nd-place finish at Daytona. At Texas, he lost to Sam Mayer by 0.002 seconds, with the finish tying for the second-closest in series history. At Talladega, Sieg won the Dash 4 Cash bonus for the first time in his career. For the last five races of the season, Ryan and his younger brother Kyle switched car numbers, with Ryan moving to the No. 28 and Kyle moving to the No. 39. The reason for Ryan getting the No. 28 was more owner's points.

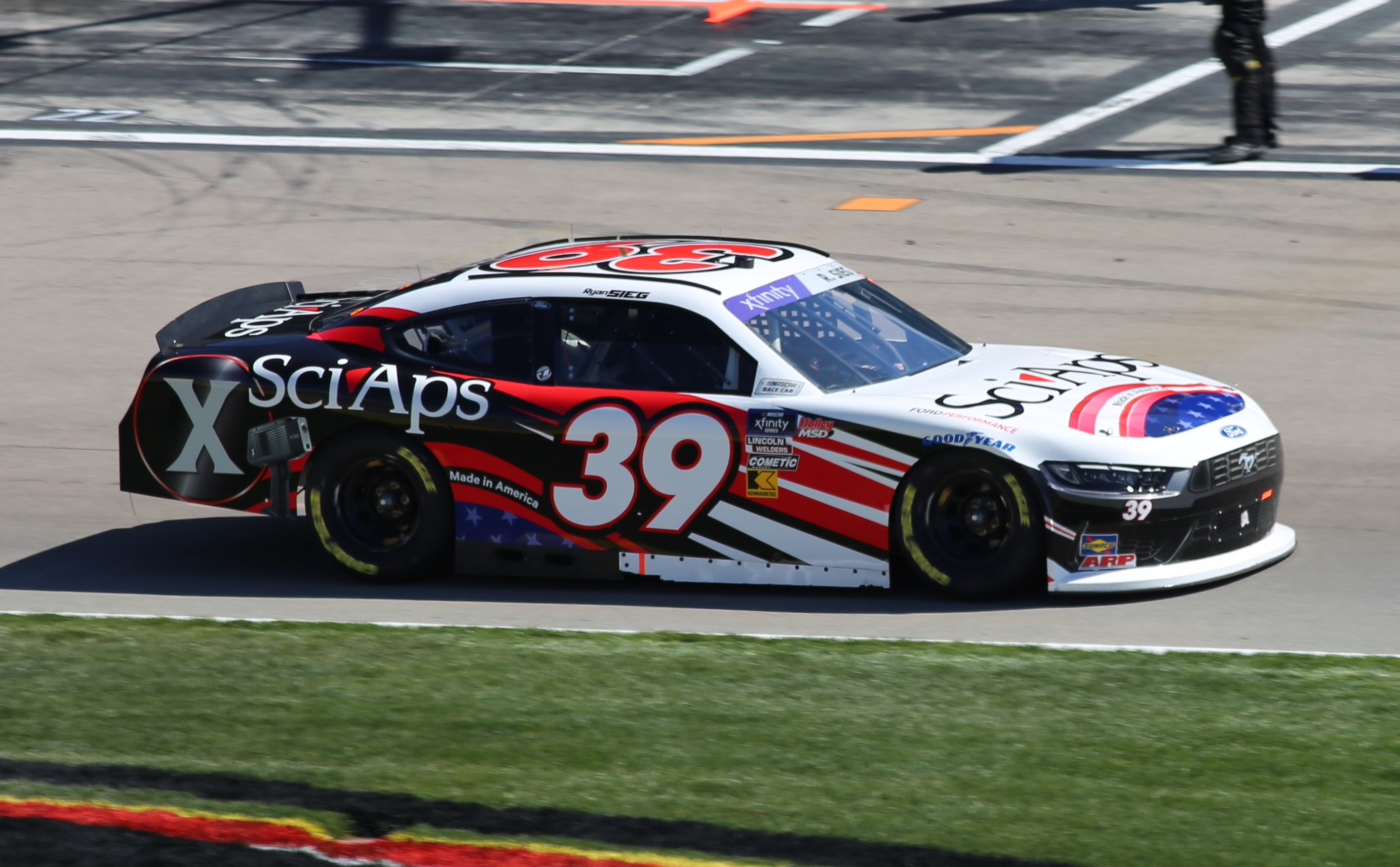
Sieg's No. 39 car at Las Vegas Motor Speedway in 2025

Sieg started the 2025 season with a nineteenth-place finish at Daytona. Prior to the Championship race at Phoenix, Haas Factory Team announced that Sieg would replace Sam Mayer, who had been suspended for the weekend.

Sieg began the 2026 season with a third-place finish at Daytona. At Iowa, Sieg earned his first career pole. In the following race at Daytona, Sieg held off Austin Hill and Carson Kvapil to score his first career victory after 424 starts in NASCAR's second-highest national series.

=== Cup Series ===
In May 2017, Sieg was signed by BK Racing to drive their No. 83 Toyota Camry in the Monster Energy NASCAR Cup Series at Dover International Speedway for the AAA 400 Drive for Autism, his MENCS debut. A month later, he replaced Gray Gaulding in BK's No. 23 Camry for the FireKeepers Casino 400 at Michigan.

Two years later, Sieg returned to the Cup Series at Indianapolis Motor Speedway, driving the No. 27 for Premium Motorsports.

== Motorsports career results ==
=== Stock car career summary ===
Season	Series	Team	Races	Wins	Top 5	Top 10	Points	Position
2009	NASCAR Camping World Truck Series	GunBroker Racing	1	0	0	0	1065	29th
2009	NASCAR Camping World Truck Series	RSS Racing	9	0	0	1	1065	29th
2010	NASCAR Camping World Truck Series	RSS Racing	25	0	0	2	2635	15th
2011	NASCAR Camping World Truck Series	RSS Racing	25	0	0	1	563	19th
2012	NASCAR Camping World Truck Series	RSS Racing	22	0	0	1	531	15th
2013	NASCAR Camping World Truck Series	RSS Racing	20	0	0	2	500	17th
2013	NASCAR Nationwide Series	RSS Racing	2	0	0	0	0	NC†
2013	NASCAR Nationwide Series	Jeremy Clements Racing	2	0	0	0	0	NC†
2014	NASCAR Camping World Truck Series	RSS Racing	3	0	0	0	0	NC†
2014	NASCAR Nationwide Series	RSS Racing	33	0	1	2	682	16th
2015	NASCAR Camping World Truck Series	RSS Racing	1	0	0	0	0	NC†
2015	NASCAR Xfinity Series	RSS Racing	33	0	0	1	827	11th
2016	NASCAR Xfinity Series	RSS Racing	33	0	1	3	2171	9th
2017	NASCAR Xfinity Series	RSS Racing	33	0	1	1	551	15th
2017	Monster Energy NASCAR Cup Series	BK Racing	5	0	0	0	0	NC†
2018	NASCAR Xfinity Series	RSS Racing	33	0	0	2	589	16th
2019	NASCAR Gander Outdoors Truck Series	Reaume Brothers Racing	2	0	0	0	0	NC†
2019	NASCAR Xfinity Series	RSS Racing	33	0	2	12	2171	11th
2019	Monster Energy NASCAR Cup Series	Premium Motorsports	1	0	0	0	0	NC†
2020	NASCAR Xfinity Series	RSS Racing	33	0	7	11	2187	10th
2021	NASCAR Xfinity Series	RSS Racing	33	0	2	7	643	14th
2022	NASCAR Xfinity Series	RSS Racing	33	0	2	13	2126	11th
2023	NASCAR Xfinity Series	RSS Racing	33	0	0	4	606	18th
2024	NASCAR Xfinity Series	RSS Racing	33	0	4	9	856	13th
2025	NASCAR Xfinity Series	RSS Racing	32	0	3	10	691	15th
2025	NASCAR Xfinity Series	Haas Factory Team	1	0	0	0	691	15th
2026	NASCAR O'Reilly Auto Parts Series	RSS Racing	26	1	2	7	612*	15th*

^{†} As Sieg was a guest driver, he was ineligible for championship points.

=== NASCAR ===
(key) (Bold – Pole position awarded by qualifying time. Italics – Pole position earned by points standings or practice time. * – Most laps led.)

==== Monster Energy Cup Series ====
Monster Energy NASCAR Cup Series results
Year	Team	No.	Make	1	2	3	4	5	6	7	8	9	10	11	12	13	14	15	16	17	18	19	20	21	22	23	24	25	26	27	28	29	30	31	32	33	34	35	36	MENCC	Pts	Ref
2017	BK Racing	83	Toyota	DAY	ATL	LVS	PHO	CAL	MAR	TEX	BRI	RCH	TAL	KAN	CLT	DOV; 26	POC			DAY; 40	KEN; 27	NHA; 32	IND	POC	GLN	MCH	BRI	DAR	RCH	CHI	NHA	DOV	CLT	TAL	KAN	MAR	TEX	PHO	HOM	58th	0^{1}	
2017	BK Racing	23	Toyota															MCH; 33	SON																					58th	0^{1}	
2019	Premium Motorsports	27	Chevy	DAY	ATL	LVS	PHO	CAL	MAR	TEX	BRI	RCH	TAL	DOV	KAN	CLT	POC	MCH	SON	CHI	DAY	KEN	NHA	POC	GLN	MCH	BRI	DAR	IND; 24	LVS	RCH	ROV	DOV	TAL	KAN	MAR	TEX	PHO	HOM	51st	0^{1}	

==== O'Reilly Auto Parts Series ====
NASCAR O'Reilly Auto Parts Series results
Year	Team	No.	Make	1	2	3	4	5	6	7	8	9	10	11	12	13	14	15	16	17	18	19	20	21	22	23	24	25	26	27	28	29	30	31	32	33	NOAPSC	Pts	Ref
2013	Jeremy Clements Racing	51	Chevy	DAY	PHO; 21	LVS; 18	BRI	CAL	TEX	RCH	TAL	DAR	CLT	DOV	IOW	MCH	ROA	KEN	DAY	NHA	CHI																116th	0^{1}	
2013	RSS Racing	39	Chevy																			IND; 24	IOW	GLN	MOH	BRI	ATL	RCH	CHI	KEN	DOV	KAN; 21	CLT	TEX	PHO	HOM	116th	0^{1}	
2014	RSS Racing	39	Chevy	DAY; 9	PHO; 14	LVS; 22	BRI; 20	CAL; 22	TEX; 17	DAR; 37	RCH; 26	TAL; 20	IOW; 17	CLT; 27	DOV; 13	MCH; 13	ROA; 22	KEN; 21	DAY; 3	NHA; 18	CHI; 18	IND; 18	IOW; 20	GLN; 34	MOH; 16	BRI; 16	ATL; 20	RCH; 23	CHI; 21	KEN; 17	DOV; 14	KAN; 20	CLT; 13	TEX; 33	PHO; 20	HOM; 36	16th	682^{2}	
2015	RSS Racing	39	Chevy	DAY; 38	ATL; 23	LVS; 21	PHO; 17	CAL; 20	TEX; 20	BRI; 17	RCH; 31	TAL; 29	IOW; 17	CLT; 24	DOV; 20	MCH; 17	CHI; 15	DAY; 27	KEN; 23	NHA; 34	IND; 12	IOW; 12	GLN; 14	MOH; 14	BRI; 16	ROA; 22	DAR; 17	RCH; 17	CHI; 18	KEN; 12	DOV; 17	CLT; 14	KAN; 8	TEX; 13	PHO; 16	HOM; 14	11th	827	
2016	RSS Racing	39	Chevy	DAY; 20	ATL; 16	LVS; 14	PHO; 27	CAL; 29	TEX; 10	BRI; 14	RCH; 21	TAL; 20	DOV; 16	CLT; 13	POC; 29	MCH; 12	IOW; 21	DAY; 3	KEN; 20	NHA; 15	IND; 18	IOW; 15	GLN; 23	MOH; 22	BRI; 37	ROA; 14	DAR; 15	RCH; 14	CHI; 12	KEN; 16	DOV; 19	CLT; 10	KAN; 34	TEX; 13	PHO; 14	HOM; 12	9th	2171	
2017	RSS Racing	39	Chevy	DAY; 21	ATL; 22	LVS; 18	PHO; 34	CAL; 21	TEX; 18	BRI; 21	RCH; 26	TAL; 12	CLT; 27	DOV; 16	POC; 23	MCH; 15	IOW; 2	DAY; 35	KEN; 18	NHA; 20	IND; 14	IOW; 14	GLN; 27	MOH; 12	BRI; 32	ROA; 20	DAR; 22	RCH; 26	CHI; 24	KEN; 20	DOV; 14	CLT; 18	KAN; 26	TEX; 20	PHO; 21		15th	551	
2017	RSS Racing	93	Chevy																																	HOM; 26	15th	551	
2018	RSS Racing	93	Chevy	DAY; 21																																	16th	589	
2018	RSS Racing	39	Chevy		ATL; 22	LVS; 29	PHO; 25	CAL; 20	TEX; 18		RCH; 21	TAL; 6	DOV; 17	CLT; 13	POC; 17	MCH; 19	IOW; 18	CHI; 20	DAY; 27	KEN; 16	NHA; 15	IOW; 34	GLN; 26	MOH; 34	BRI; 11	ROA; 26	DAR; 17	IND; 13	LVS; 12	RCH; 17	ROV; 36	DOV; 18	KAN; 9	TEX; 12	PHO; 19		16th	589	
2018	RSS Racing	38	Chevy							BRI; 15																										HOM; 22	16th	589	
2019	RSS Racing	39	Chevy	DAY; 4	ATL; 11	LVS; 6	PHO; 10	CAL; 11	TEX; 10	BRI; 12	RCH; 5	TAL; 16	DOV; 11	CLT; 8	POC; 26	MCH; 17	IOW; 30	CHI; 12	DAY; 24	KEN; 9		IOW; 12	GLN; 30	MOH; 16	BRI; 25	ROA; 11	DAR; 14	IND; 10	LVS; 38	RCH; 12	ROV; 30	DOV; 10	KAN; 9	TEX; 10	PHO; 13	HOM; 12	11th	2171	
2019	RSS Racing	93	Chevy																		NHA; 8																11th	2171	
2020	RSS Racing	39	Chevy	DAY; 9	LVS; 3	CAL; 4	PHO; 11	DAR; 7	CLT; 28	BRI; 16	ATL; 35	HOM; 28	HOM; 19	TAL; 30	POC; 12	IRC; 17	KEN; 9	KEN; 35	TEX; 29	KAN; 4	ROA; 9	DRC; 11	DOV; 12	DOV; 14	DAY; 23	DAR; 3	RCH; 12	RCH; 15	BRI; 14	LVS; 5	TAL; 2	ROV; 21	KAN; 3	TEX; 31	MAR; 11	PHO; 31	10th	2187	
2021	RSS Racing	39	Ford	DAY; 31	DRC; 27	HOM; 8	LVS; 38	PHO; 37	ATL; 10	MAR; 23	TAL; 5	DAR; 9	DOV; 8	COA; 25	CLT; 31	MOH; 9	TEX; 11	NSH; 16	POC; 17	ROA; 22	ATL; 12	NHA; 13	GLN; 18	IRC; 32	MCH; 12	DAY; 16	DAR; 11	RCH; 13	BRI; 34	LVS; 17	TAL; 11	ROV; 32	TEX; 14	KAN; 5	MAR; 31		14th	643	
2021	RSS Racing	38	Ford																																	PHO; 17	14th	643	
2022	RSS Racing	39	Ford	DAY; 8	CAL; 10	LVS; 36	PHO; 11	ATL; 10	COA; 11	RCH; 9	MAR; 9		DOV; 10	DAR; 11	TEX; 35	CLT; 32	PIR; 16	NSH; 9	ROA; 10	ATL; 15	NHA; 32	POC; 15	IRC; 27	MCH; 15	GLN; 13	DAY; 26	DAR; 18	KAN; 14	BRI; 10	TEX; 9	TAL; 4	ROV; 9	LVS; 38	HOM; 33	MAR; 33	PHO; 20	11th	2126	
2022	RSS Racing	38	Ford									TAL; 4																									11th	2126	
2023	RSS Racing	38	Ford	DAY; 8																																	18th	606	
2023	RSS Racing	39	Ford		CAL; 14	LVS; 24	PHO; 16	ATL; 11	COA; 23	RCH; 7	MAR; 18	TAL; 22	DOV; 16	DAR; 27	CLT; 24	PIR; 18	SON; 28	NSH; 19	CSC; 25	ATL; 37	NHA; 33	POC; 22	ROA; 13	MCH; 13	IRC; 32	GLN; 21	DAY; 6	DAR; 30	KAN; 30	BRI; 6	TEX; 11	ROV; 13	LVS; 16	HOM; 14	MAR; 35	PHO; 18	18th	606	
2024	RSS Racing	39	Ford	DAY; 22	ATL; 22	LVS; 7	PHO; 12	COA; 14	RCH; 32	MAR; 17	TEX; 2	TAL; 17	DOV; 37	DAR; 13	CLT; 7	PIR; 14	SON; 20	IOW; 12	NHA; 6	NSH; 11	CSC; 16	POC; 12	IND; 11	MCH; 13	DAY; 5	DAR; 18	ATL; 32	GLN; 22	BRI; 8	KAN; 16	TAL; 2						13th	856	
2024	RSS Racing	28	Ford																													ROV; 17	LVS; 2	HOM; 7	MAR; 15	PHO; 23	13th	856	
2025	RSS Racing	39	Ford	DAY; 19	ATL; 20	COA; 19	PHO; 4	LVS; 7	HOM; 22	MAR; 8	DAR; 12	BRI; 7	CAR; 18*	TAL; 36	TEX; 8	CLT; 14	NSH; 21	MXC; 29	POC; 5	ATL; 30	CSC; 38	SON; 35	DOV; 6	IND; 5	IOW; 8	GLN; 28	DAY; 31*	PIR; 24	GTW; 27	BRI; 23	KAN; 19	ROV; 20	LVS; 7	TAL; 35	MAR; 15		15th	691	
2025	Haas Factory Team	41	Ford																																	PHO; 37	15th	691	
2026	RSS Racing	39	Chevy	DAY; 3	ATL; 37	COA; 16	PHO; 17	LVS; 33	DAR; 13	MAR; 9	CAR; 9	BRI; 11	KAN; 10	TAL; 21	TEX; 14	GLN; 23	DOV; 8	CLT; 7	NSH; 13	POC; 26	COR; 11	SON; 15	CHI; 31	ATL; 16	IND; 17	**IOW**; 33		DAR; 19	GTW; 14	BRI; 30	LVS; 12	CLT; 17	PHO; 23	TAL; 14	MAR; 11	HOM; 12	15th	758	
2026	RSS Racing	38	Chevy																								DAY; 1										15th	758	

==== Gander Outdoors Truck Series ====
NASCAR Gander Outdoors Truck Series results
Year	Team	No.	Make	1	2	3	4	5	6	7	8	9	10	11	12	13	14	15	16	17	18	19	20	21	22	23	24	25	NGOTC	Pts	Ref
2009	GunBroker Racing	21	Dodge	DAY	CAL	ATL	MAR; 34	KAN	CLT	DOV	TEX	MCH																	29th	1065	
2009	RSS Racing	39	Chevy										MLW; 13	MEM	KEN; 19	IRP	NSH; 21	BRI	CHI; 17	IOW; 25	GTW; 9	NHA	LVS; 14	MAR	TAL	TEX; 15	PHO	HOM; 22	29th	1065	
2010	RSS Racing	39	Chevy	DAY; 16	ATL; 18	MAR; 24	NSH; 27	KAN; 19	DOV; 9	CLT; 32	TEX; 30	MCH; 22	IOW; 11	GTY; 31		POC; 20	NSH; 13	DAR; 11	BRI; 22	CHI; 15	KEN; 8	NHA; 20	LVS; 25	MAR; 11	TAL; 24	TEX; 16	PHO; 20	HOM; 16	15th	2635	
2010	RSS Racing	93	Chevy												IRP; 25														15th	2635	
2011	RSS Racing	39	Chevy	DAY; 25	PHO; 21	DAR; 16	MAR; 33	NSH; 21	DOV; 15	CLT; 24	KAN; 31	TEX; 7	KEN; 19	IOW; 18	NSH; 24	IRP; 29	POC; 21	MCH; 17	BRI; 25	ATL; 15	CHI; 28	NHA; 22	KEN; 33	LVS; 11	TAL; 21	MAR; 23	TEX; 15	HOM; 24	19th	563	
2012	RSS Racing	39	Chevy	DAY; 15	MAR; 32	CAR; 22	KAN; 29	CLT; 28	DOV; 29	TEX; 19	KEN; 16	IOW; 17		POC; 29	MCH; 15	BRI; 12	ATL; 17	IOW; 14	KEN; 22	LVS; 22	TAL; 11	MAR; 26	TEX; 13	PHO; 6	HOM; 14				15th	531	
2012	RSS Racing	93	Chevy										CHI; 30																15th	531	
2013	RSS Racing	39	Chevy	DAY; 10	MAR; 8	CAR; 22	KAN; 29	CLT; 15	DOV; 17	TEX; 16		IOW; 18	ELD	POC; 30	MCH; 15	BRI; 32	MSP	IOW; 21	CHI; 21	LVS; 19	TAL; 23	MAR; 25		PHO; 17	HOM; 12				17th	500	
2013	RSS Racing	93	Chevy								KEN; 20												TEX; 11						17th	500	
2014	RSS Racing	39	Chevy	DAY; 11	MAR	KAN	CLT	DOV; 24	TEX	GTW	KEN	IOW	ELD	POC	MCH	BRI	MSP	CHI	NHA	LVS	TAL; 33	MAR	TEX	PHO	HOM				97th	0^{2}	
2015	RSS Racing	39	Chevy	DAY	ATL; 11	MAR	KAN	CLT	DOV	TEX	GTW	IOW	KEN	ELD	POC	MCH	BRI	MSP	CHI	NHA	LVS	TAL	MAR	TEX	PHO	HOM			94th	0^{1}	
2019	Reaume Brothers Racing	33	Chevy	DAY	ATL	LVS	MAR	TEX	DOV; 16	KAN	CLT	TEX	IOW	GTW	CHI	KEN	POC	ELD	MCH	BRI; 14	MSP	LVS	TAL	MAR	PHO	HOM			104th	0^{1}	

^{*} Season still in progress
^{1} Ineligible for series points
^{2} Sieg started the 2014 season running for Truck Series points but switched to Nationwide before Fontana.
