= 2013 Virginia 529 College Savings 250 =

25th race of the 2013 NASCAR Nationwide Series

Race details
- Race 25 of 33 of the 2013 NASCAR Nationwide Series
- Date: September 6, 2013
- Official name: 32nd Annual Virginia 529 College Savings 250
- Location: Richmond, Virginia, Richmond Raceway
- Course: Permanent racing facility
- Course length: 0.75 miles (1.21 km)
- Distance: 250 laps, 187.5 mi (301.752 km)
- Scheduled distance: 250 laps, 187.5 mi (301.752 km)
- Average speed: 97.304 miles per hour (156.596 km/h)

Pole position
| Driver | Brian Scott | Richard Childress Racing |
- Time: 21.717

Most laps led
| Driver | Brian Scott | Richard Childress Racing |
- Laps: 239

Winner
| No. 22 | Brad Keselowski | Penske Racing |

Television in the United States
- Network: ESPN2
- Announcers: Marty Reid, Dale Jarrett, Andy Petree

Radio in the United States
- Radio: Motor Racing Network

The 2013 Virginia 529 College Savings 250 was the 25th stock car race of the 2013 NASCAR Nationwide Series and the 32nd iteration of the event. The race was held on Friday, September 6, 2013, in Richmond, Virginia, at Richmond International Raceway, a 0.75-mile (1.21 km) D-shaped oval. The race took the scheduled 250 laps to complete. At race's end, Brad Keselowski, driving for Penske Racing, would pass eventual second-place finisher, Richard Childress Racing driver Brian Scott, late in the race to win his 25th career NASCAR Nationwide Series win and his fifth win of the season. To fill out the podium, Regan Smith of JR Motorsports finished third.

== Background ==
The layout of Richmond International Raceway, the venue where the race was at.

Richmond International Raceway (RIR) is a 3/4-mile (1.2 km), D-shaped, asphalt race track located just outside Richmond, Virginia in Henrico County. It hosts the Monster Energy NASCAR Cup Series and Xfinity Series. Known as "America's premier short track", it formerly hosted a NASCAR Camping World Truck Series race, an IndyCar Series race, and two USAC sprint car races.

=== Entry list ===
- (R) denotes rookie driver.
- (i) denotes driver who is ineligible for series driver points.

| # | Driver | Team | Make | Sponsor |
|---|---|---|---|---|
| 00 | Brett Butler | SR² Motorsports | Toyota | SR² Motorsports |
| 01 | Mike Wallace | JD Motorsports | Chevrolet | Iron Source |
| 2 | Brian Scott | Richard Childress Racing | Chevrolet | Shore Lodge |
| 3 | Austin Dillon | Richard Childress Racing | Chevrolet | AdvoCare |
| 4 | Landon Cassill | JD Motorsports | Chevrolet | JD Motorsports |
| 5 | Jamie McMurray (i) | JR Motorsports | Chevrolet | Nioxin |
| 6 | Trevor Bayne | Roush Fenway Racing | Ford | Roush Fenway Racing Driven |
| 7 | Regan Smith | JR Motorsports | Chevrolet | Hellmann's 100 Years |
| 10 | Chase Miller | TriStar Motorsports | Toyota | TriStar Motorsports |
| 11 | Elliott Sadler | Joe Gibbs Racing | Toyota | OneMain Financial Throwback |
| 12 | Sam Hornish Jr. | Penske Racing | Ford | Penske Truck Rental |
| 14 | Jeff Green | TriStar Motorsports | Toyota | Reynolds Wrap, Hefty |
| 16 | Ryan Reed | Roush Fenway Racing | Ford | Drive to Stop Diabetes |
| 18 | Matt Kenseth (i) | Joe Gibbs Racing | Toyota | Reser's Fine Foods |
| 19 | Mike Bliss | TriStar Motorsports | Toyota | TriStar Motorsports |
| 20 | Brian Vickers | Joe Gibbs Racing | Toyota | Dollar General |
| 22 | Brad Keselowski (i) | Penske Racing | Ford | Hertz |
| 23 | Robert Richardson Jr. | R3 Motorsports | Chevrolet | North Texas Pipe |
| 24 | Ryan Ellis | SR² Motorsports | Toyota | Kappa Sigma |
| 29 | Kenny Wallace | RAB Racing | Toyota | American Ethanol |
| 30 | Nelson Piquet Jr. (R) | Turner Scott Motorsports | Chevrolet | Worx Yard Tools |
| 31 | Justin Allgaier | Turner Scott Motorsports | Chevrolet | Brandt Professional Agriculture |
| 32 | Kyle Larson (R) | Turner Scott Motorsports | Chevrolet | Snickers |
| 33 | Ty Dillon (i) | Richard Childress Racing | Chevrolet | Armour Vienna Sausage |
| 37 | Matt DiBenedetto | Vision Racing | Dodge | National Cash Lenders |
| 40 | Reed Sorenson | The Motorsports Group | Chevrolet | The Motorsports Group |
| 42 | Josh Wise | The Motorsports Group | Chevrolet | The Motorsports Group |
| 43 | Michael Annett | Richard Petty Motorsports | Ford | Pilot Flying J |
| 44 | Hal Martin | TriStar Motorsports | Toyota | U. S. Forensic |
| 46 | J. J. Yeley (i) | The Motorsports Group | Chevrolet | The Motorsports Group |
| 50 | Danny Efland | MAKE Motorsports | Chevrolet | Defiant Whiskey |
| 51 | Jeremy Clements | Jeremy Clements Racing | Chevrolet | Defiant Whiskey |
| 52 | Joey Gase | Jimmy Means Racing | Toyota | Donate Life |
| 54 | Kyle Busch (i) | Joe Gibbs Racing | Toyota | Monster Energy |
| 55 | Jamie Dick | Viva Motorsports | Chevrolet | Viva Motorsports |
| 60 | Travis Pastrana | Roush Fenway Racing | Ford | Roush Fenway Racing |
| 70 | Johanna Long | ML Motorsports | Chevrolet | ForeTravel Motorcoach |
| 73 | Derrike Cope | Creation-Cope Racing | Chevrolet | Carolina Pie Company |
| 74 | Carl Long | Mike Harmon Racing | Dodge | Mike Harmon Racing |
| 77 | Parker Kligerman | Kyle Busch Motorsports | Toyota | Toyota |
| 79 | Jeffrey Earnhardt (R) | Go Green Racing | Ford | Keen Parts |
| 86 | Ricky Ehrgott (i) | Deware Racing Group | Chevrolet | Platinum Wealth Partners, Rev1 Power Services |
| 87 | Joe Nemechek | NEMCO Motorsports | Toyota | Wood Pellet Grills |
| 89 | Morgan Shepherd | Shepherd Racing Ventures | Chevrolet | King's Tire, Racing with Jesus |
| 99 | Alex Bowman (R) | RAB Racing | Toyota | ToyotaCare |
Official entry list

== Practice ==
The only two-hour and 30-minute practice session took place on Friday, September 6, at 9:00 AM EST. Parker Kligerman of Kyle Busch Motorsports would set the fastest time in the session, with a lap of 21.636 and an average speed of 124.792 miles per hour (200.833 km/h).

| Pos. | # | Driver | Team | Make | Time | Speed |
|---|---|---|---|---|---|---|
| 1 | 77 | Parker Kligerman | Kyle Busch Motorsports | Toyota | 21.636 | 124.792 |
| 2 | 29 | Kenny Wallace | RAB Racing | Toyota | 21.754 | 124.115 |
| 3 | 18 | Matt Kenseth (i) | Joe Gibbs Racing | Toyota | 21.844 | 123.604 |
Full practice results

== Qualifying ==
Qualifying was held on Friday, September 6, at 4:05 PM EST. Each driver would have two laps to set a fastest time; the fastest of the two would count as their official qualifying lap.

Brian Scott of Richard Childress Racing would win the pole, setting a time of 21.717 and an average speed of 124.327 miles per hour (200.085 km/h).

Five drivers would fail to qualify: Danny Efland, Carl Long, Morgan Shepherd, Derrike Cope, and Brett Butler.

=== Full qualifying results ===
| Pos. | # | Driver | Team | Make | Time | Speed |
|---|---|---|---|---|---|---|
| 1 | 2 | Brian Scott | Richard Childress Racing | Chevrolet | 21.717 | 124.327 |
| 2 | 18 | Matt Kenseth (i) | Joe Gibbs Racing | Toyota | 21.723 | 124.292 |
| 3 | 3 | Austin Dillon | Richard Childress Racing | Chevrolet | 21.736 | 124.218 |
| 4 | 22 | Brad Keselowski (i) | Penske Racing | Ford | 21.776 | 123.990 |
| 5 | 12 | Sam Hornish Jr. | Penske Racing | Ford | 21.781 | 123.961 |
| 6 | 99 | Alex Bowman (R) | RAB Racing | Toyota | 21.830 | 123.683 |
| 7 | 54 | Kyle Busch (i) | Joe Gibbs Racing | Toyota | 21.857 | 123.530 |
| 8 | 7 | Regan Smith | JR Motorsports | Chevrolet | 21.876 | 123.423 |
| 9 | 20 | Brian Vickers | Joe Gibbs Racing | Toyota | 21.880 | 123.400 |
| 10 | 29 | Kenny Wallace | RAB Racing | Toyota | 21.881 | 123.395 |
| 11 | 43 | Michael Annett | Richard Petty Motorsports | Ford | 21.886 | 123.367 |
| 12 | 77 | Parker Kligerman | Kyle Busch Motorsports | Toyota | 21.932 | 123.108 |
| 13 | 31 | Justin Allgaier | Turner Scott Motorsports | Chevrolet | 21.953 | 122.990 |
| 14 | 5 | Jamie McMurray (i) | JR Motorsports | Chevrolet | 21.954 | 122.984 |
| 15 | 6 | Trevor Bayne | Roush Fenway Racing | Ford | 21.961 | 122.945 |
| 16 | 30 | Nelson Piquet Jr. (R) | Turner Scott Motorsports | Chevrolet | 21.963 | 122.934 |
| 17 | 11 | Elliott Sadler | Joe Gibbs Racing | Toyota | 21.982 | 122.828 |
| 18 | 32 | Kyle Larson (R) | Turner Scott Motorsports | Chevrolet | 21.982 | 122.828 |
| 19 | 33 | Ty Dillon (i) | Richard Childress Racing | Chevrolet | 22.049 | 122.455 |
| 20 | 14 | Jeff Green | TriStar Motorsports | Toyota | 22.071 | 122.332 |
| 21 | 87 | Joe Nemechek | NEMCO Motorsports | Toyota | 22.128 | 122.017 |
| 22 | 60 | Travis Pastrana | Roush Fenway Racing | Ford | 22.136 | 121.973 |
| 23 | 19 | Mike Bliss | TriStar Motorsports | Toyota | 22.154 | 121.874 |
| 24 | 10 | Chase Miller | TriStar Motorsports | Toyota | 22.155 | 121.869 |
| 25 | 70 | Johanna Long | ML Motorsports | Chevrolet | 22.158 | 121.852 |
| 26 | 16 | Ryan Reed | Roush Fenway Racing | Ford | 22.181 | 121.726 |
| 27 | 4 | Landon Cassill | JD Motorsports | Chevrolet | 22.189 | 121.682 |
| 28 | 37 | Matt DiBenedetto | Vision Racing | Dodge | 22.228 | 121.468 |
| 29 | 55 | Jamie Dick | Viva Motorsports | Chevrolet | 22.254 | 121.327 |
| 30 | 44 | Hal Martin | TriStar Motorsports | Toyota | 22.293 | 121.114 |
| 31 | 01 | Mike Wallace | JD Motorsports | Chevrolet | 22.332 | 120.903 |
| 32 | 51 | Jeremy Clements | Jeremy Clements Racing | Chevrolet | 22.370 | 120.697 |
| 33 | 42 | Josh Wise | The Motorsports Group | Chevrolet | 22.497 | 120.016 |
| 34 | 40 | Reed Sorenson | The Motorsports Group | Chevrolet | 22.541 | 119.782 |
| 35 | 86 | Ricky Ehrgott (i) | Deware Racing Group | Chevrolet | 22.558 | 119.691 |
| 36 | 24 | Ryan Ellis | SR² Motorsports | Toyota | 22.653 | 119.190 |
| 37 | 52 | Joey Gase | Jimmy Means Racing | Chevrolet | 22.663 | 119.137 |
| 38 | 79 | Jeffrey Earnhardt (R) | Go Green Racing | Ford | 22.669 | 119.105 |
Qualified by owner's points
| 39 | 23 | Robert Richardson Jr. | R3 Motorsports | Chevrolet | 23.013 | 117.325 |
Last car to qualify on time
| 40 | 46 | J. J. Yeley (i) | The Motorsports Group | Chevrolet | 22.676 | 119.069 |
Failed to qualify
| 41 | 50 | Danny Efland | MAKE Motorsports | Chevrolet | 22.729 | 118.791 |
| 42 | 74 | Carl Long | Mike Harmon Racing | Dodge | 22.836 | 118.234 |
| 43 | 89 | Morgan Shepherd | Shepherd Racing Ventures | Chevrolet | 22.837 | 118.229 |
| 44 | 73 | Derrike Cope | Creation-Cope Racing | Chevrolet | 23.000 | 117.391 |
| 45 | 00 | Brett Butler | SR² Motorsports | Toyota | 23.281 | 115.974 |
Official starting lineup

== Race results ==
| Fin | St | # | Driver | Team | Make | Laps | Led | Status | Pts | Winnings |
|---|---|---|---|---|---|---|---|---|---|---|
| 1 | 4 | 22 | Brad Keselowski (i) | Penske Racing | Ford | 250 | 11 | running | 0 | $42,640 |
| 2 | 1 | 2 | Brian Scott | Richard Childress Racing | Chevrolet | 250 | 239 | running | 44 | $49,950 |
| 3 | 8 | 7 | Regan Smith | JR Motorsports | Chevrolet | 250 | 0 | running | 41 | $30,275 |
| 4 | 7 | 54 | Kyle Busch (i) | Joe Gibbs Racing | Toyota | 250 | 0 | running | 0 | $21,525 |
| 5 | 15 | 6 | Trevor Bayne | Roush Fenway Racing | Ford | 250 | 0 | running | 39 | $24,600 |
| 6 | 5 | 12 | Sam Hornish Jr. | Penske Racing | Ford | 250 | 0 | running | 38 | $22,650 |
| 7 | 9 | 20 | Brian Vickers | Joe Gibbs Racing | Toyota | 250 | 0 | running | 37 | $22,335 |
| 8 | 17 | 11 | Elliott Sadler | Joe Gibbs Racing | Toyota | 250 | 0 | running | 36 | $23,095 |
| 9 | 26 | 16 | Ryan Reed | Roush Fenway Racing | Ford | 250 | 0 | running | 35 | $21,850 |
| 10 | 14 | 5 | Jamie McMurray (i) | JR Motorsports | Chevrolet | 250 | 0 | running | 0 | $16,850 |
| 11 | 13 | 31 | Justin Allgaier | Turner Scott Motorsports | Chevrolet | 250 | 0 | running | 33 | $21,550 |
| 12 | 3 | 3 | Austin Dillon | Richard Childress Racing | Chevrolet | 250 | 0 | running | 32 | $21,475 |
| 13 | 11 | 43 | Michael Annett | Richard Petty Motorsports | Ford | 250 | 0 | running | 31 | $21,425 |
| 14 | 18 | 32 | Kyle Larson (R) | Turner Scott Motorsports | Chevrolet | 250 | 0 | running | 30 | $22,375 |
| 15 | 6 | 99 | Alex Bowman (R) | RAB Racing | Toyota | 250 | 0 | running | 29 | $22,275 |
| 16 | 19 | 33 | Ty Dillon (i) | Richard Childress Racing | Chevrolet | 250 | 0 | running | 0 | $21,475 |
| 17 | 10 | 29 | Kenny Wallace | RAB Racing | Toyota | 250 | 0 | running | 27 | $15,175 |
| 18 | 23 | 19 | Mike Bliss | TriStar Motorsports | Toyota | 250 | 0 | running | 26 | $21,125 |
| 19 | 25 | 70 | Johanna Long | ML Motorsports | Chevrolet | 250 | 0 | running | 25 | $21,075 |
| 20 | 22 | 60 | Travis Pastrana | Roush Fenway Racing | Ford | 250 | 0 | running | 24 | $21,700 |
| 21 | 16 | 30 | Nelson Piquet Jr. (R) | Turner Scott Motorsports | Chevrolet | 250 | 0 | running | 23 | $20,975 |
| 22 | 20 | 14 | Jeff Green | TriStar Motorsports | Toyota | 250 | 0 | running | 22 | $20,850 |
| 23 | 27 | 4 | Landon Cassill | JD Motorsports | Chevrolet | 249 | 0 | running | 21 | $20,765 |
| 24 | 31 | 01 | Mike Wallace | JD Motorsports | Chevrolet | 248 | 0 | running | 20 | $20,650 |
| 25 | 29 | 55 | Jamie Dick | Viva Motorsports | Chevrolet | 248 | 0 | running | 19 | $21,075 |
| 26 | 32 | 51 | Jeremy Clements | Jeremy Clements Racing | Chevrolet | 247 | 0 | running | 18 | $20,500 |
| 27 | 34 | 40 | Reed Sorenson | The Motorsports Group | Chevrolet | 247 | 0 | running | 17 | $20,450 |
| 28 | 38 | 79 | Jeffrey Earnhardt (R) | Go Green Racing | Ford | 247 | 0 | running | 16 | $20,300 |
| 29 | 21 | 87 | Joe Nemechek | NEMCO Motorsports | Toyota | 247 | 0 | running | 15 | $20,250 |
| 30 | 30 | 44 | Hal Martin | TriStar Motorsports | Toyota | 246 | 0 | running | 14 | $20,450 |
| 31 | 36 | 24 | Ryan Ellis | SR² Motorsports | Toyota | 246 | 0 | running | 13 | $20,100 |
| 32 | 37 | 52 | Joey Gase | Jimmy Means Racing | Chevrolet | 246 | 0 | running | 12 | $20,030 |
| 33 | 35 | 86 | Ricky Ehrgott (i) | Deware Racing Group | Chevrolet | 245 | 0 | running | 0 | $13,960 |
| 34 | 39 | 23 | Robert Richardson Jr. | R3 Motorsports | Chevrolet | 244 | 0 | running | 10 | $19,915 |
| 35 | 2 | 18 | Matt Kenseth (i) | Joe Gibbs Racing | Toyota | 235 | 0 | crash | 0 | $13,837 |
| 36 | 12 | 77 | Parker Kligerman | Kyle Busch Motorsports | Toyota | 210 | 0 | electrical | 8 | $18,880 |
| 37 | 28 | 37 | Matt DiBenedetto | Vision Racing | Dodge | 56 | 0 | brakes | 0 | $12,820 |
| 38 | 33 | 42 | Josh Wise | The Motorsports Group | Chevrolet | 8 | 0 | rear gear | 6 | $12,741 |
| 39 | 24 | 10 | Chase Miller | TriStar Motorsports | Toyota | 5 | 0 | vibration | 5 | $12,620 |
| 40 | 40 | 46 | J. J. Yeley (i) | The Motorsports Group | Chevrolet | 4 | 0 | engine | 0 | $12,580 |
Failed to qualify
| 41 | | 50 | Danny Efland | MAKE Motorsports | Chevrolet | | | | | |
| 42 | | 74 | Carl Long | Mike Harmon Racing | Dodge | | | | | |
| 43 | | 89 | Morgan Shepherd | Shepherd Racing Ventures | Chevrolet | | | | | |
| 44 | | 73 | Derrike Cope | Creation-Cope Racing | Chevrolet | | | | | |
| 45 | | 00 | Brett Butler | SR² Motorsports | Toyota | | | | | |
Official race results

== Standings after the race ==
Drivers' Championship standings

| Pos | Driver | Points |
|---|---|---|
| 1 | Sam Hornish Jr. | 880 |
| 2 | Austin Dillon | 864 (-16) |
| 3 | Regan Smith | 854 (-26) |
| 4 | Elliott Sadler | 852 (–28) |
| 5 | Justin Allgaier | 828 (–52) |
| 6 | Brian Vickers | 827 (–53) |
| 7 | Kyle Larson | 819 (–61) |
| 8 | Brian Scott | 810 (–70) |
| 9 | Trevor Bayne | 799 (–81) |
| 10 | Parker Kligerman | 732 (–148) |
Official driver's standings

- Note: Only the first 10 positions are included for the driver standings.

| Previous race: 2013 Great Clips/Grit Chips 300 | NASCAR Nationwide Series; 2013 season | Next race: 2013 Dollar General 300 |
