= 2013 Nationwide Children's Hospital 200 =

22nd race of the 2013 NASCAR Nationwide Series

Race details
- Race 22 of 33 of the 2013 NASCAR Nationwide Series
- Date: August 17, 2013
- Official name: Inaugural Nationwide Children's Hospital 200
- Location: Lexington, Ohio, Mid-Ohio Sports Car Course
- Course: Permanent racing facility
- Course length: 2.258 miles (3.634 km)
- Distance: 94 laps, 212.252 mi (341.586 km)
- Scheduled distance: 90 laps, 203.22 mi (327.05 km)
- Average speed: 77.724 miles per hour (125.085 km/h)

Pole position
Driver	Michael McDowell	Joe Gibbs Racing
- Time: 1:24.450

Most laps led
Driver	A. J. Allmendinger	Penske Racing
- Laps: 73

Winner
No. 22	A. J. Allmendinger	Penske Racing

Television in the United States
- Network: ESPN
- Announcers: Marty Reid, Ricky Craven

Radio in the United States
- Radio: Motor Racing Network

The 2013 Nationwide Children's Hospital 200 was the 22nd stock car race of the 2013 NASCAR Nationwide Series and the inaugural iteration of the event. The race was held on Saturday, August 17, 2013, in Lexington, Ohio at the Mid-Ohio Sports Car Course, a 2.258 miles (3.634 km) permanent road course. The race was extended from its scheduled 90 laps to 94 due to a green–white–checker finish. At race's end, A. J. Allmendinger, driving for Penske Racing, would dominate the race to win his second career NASCAR Nationwide Series win and his second and final win of the season. To fill out the podium, Michael McDowell of Joe Gibbs Racing and Sam Hornish Jr. of Penske Racing would finish second and third, respectively.

== Background ==
The track is a road course auto racing facility located in Troy Township, Morrow County, Ohio, United States, just outside the village of Lexington. Mid-Ohio has also colloquially become a term for the entire north-central region of the state, from south of Sandusky to the north of Columbus.

The track opened as a 15-turn, 2.4 mile (3.86 km) road circuit run clockwise. The back portion of the track allows speeds approaching 180 mph (290 km/h). A separate starting line is located on the backstretch to allow for safer rolling starts. The regular start / finish line is located on the pit straight. There is grandstand seating for 10,000 spectators and three observation mounds alongside the track raise the capacity to over 75,000.

=== Entry list ===
- (R) denotes rookie driver.
- (i) denotes driver who is ineligible for series driver points.

#	Driver	Team	Make	Sponsor
00	Blake Koch	SR² Motorsports	Toyota	SR² Motorsports
01	Mike Wallace	JD Motorsports	Chevrolet	Drive Sober Or Get Pulled Over
2	Brian Scott	Richard Childress Racing	Chevrolet	Shore Lodge
3	Austin Dillon	Richard Childress Racing	Chevrolet	AdvoCare, Nationwide Children's Hospital
4	Kevin Lepage	JD Motorsports	Chevrolet	JD Motorsports
5	Ron Fellows (i)	JR Motorsports	Chevrolet	AER Manufacturing
6	Trevor Bayne	Roush Fenway Racing	Ford	Nationwide Children's Hospital
7	Regan Smith	JR Motorsports	Chevrolet	Nationwide Children's Hospital
9	Marcos Ambrose (i)	Richard Petty Motorsports	Ford	DeWalt, Stanley
10	Chase Miller	TriStar Motorsports	Toyota	TriStar Motorsports
11	Elliott Sadler	Joe Gibbs Racing	Toyota	OneMain Financial
12	Sam Hornish Jr.	Penske Racing	Ford	Alliance Truck Parts
14	Jeff Green	TriStar Motorsports	Toyota	Hefty, Reynolds Wrap
15	Stanton Barrett	Rick Ware Racing	Ford	4Caring.org
18	Michael McDowell (i)	Joe Gibbs Racing	Toyota	K-Love
19	Mike Bliss	TriStar Motorsports	Toyota	TriStar Motorsports
20	Brian Vickers	Joe Gibbs Racing	Toyota	Dollar General
22	A. J. Allmendinger (i)	Penske Racing	Ford	Discount Tire
23	Anthony Gandon	Rick Ware Racing	Ford	NASCAR Whelen Euro Series
24	Alex Kennedy (i)	SR² Motorsports	Toyota	SR² Motorsports
30	Nelson Piquet Jr. (R)	Turner Scott Motorsports	Chevrolet	Worx Yard Tools
31	Justin Allgaier	Turner Scott Motorsports	Chevrolet	AccuDoc Solutions, Nationwide Children's Hospital
32	Kyle Larson (R)	Turner Scott Motorsports	Chevrolet	McDonald's
33	Max Papis	Richard Childress Racing	Chevrolet	Menards, Rheem
40	Reed Sorenson	The Motorsports Group	Chevrolet	Swisher E-Cigarette
42	T. J. Bell	The Motorsports Group	Chevrolet	The Motorsports Group
43	Michael Annett	Richard Petty Motorsports	Ford	Pilot Travel Centers
44	Chad Hackenbracht (i)	TriStar Motorsports	Toyota	Tastee Apple
46	Dexter Stacey	The Motorsports Group	Chevrolet	The Motorsports Group
51	Jeremy Clements	Jeremy Clements Racing	Chevrolet	Jeremy Clements Racing
52	Ryan Ellis	Jimmy Means Racing	Chevrolet	Jimmy Means Racing
53	Andrew Ranger	NDS Motorsports	Dodge	Waste Management
54	Owen Kelly	Joe Gibbs Racing	Toyota	Monster Energy
60	Travis Pastrana	Roush Fenway Racing	Ford	Nationwide Children's Hospital
70	Tomy Drissi (i)	ML Motorsports	Toyota	The Counselor
73	Alx Danielsson	Creation-Cope Racing	Chevrolet	Bactiguard
74	Kevin O'Connell	Mike Harmon Racing	Chevrolet	I-Car Gold Class
75	Kenny Habul	SunEnergy1 Racing	Toyota	Schneider Electric
77	Parker Kligerman	Kyle Busch Motorsports	Toyota	Bandit Chippers
79	Jeffrey Earnhardt (R)	Go Green Racing	Ford	Uponor
86	Tim Cowen	Deware Racing Group	Ford	Cowen Logistics
87	Kyle Kelley	NEMCO Motorsports	Chevrolet	First Class Auto Body, Jamison Engineering
99	Alex Bowman (R)	RAB Racing	Toyota	Nationwide Children's Hospital
Official entry list

== Practice ==
=== First practice ===
The first practice session would occur on Thursday, August 15, at 9:00 AM EST and would last for three hours. Michael McDowell of Joe Gibbs Racing would set the fastest time in the session, with a lap of 1:25.699 and an average speed of 94.853 miles per hour (152.651 km/h).

Pos.	#	Driver	Team	Make	Time	Speed
1	18	Michael McDowell (i)	Joe Gibbs Racing	Toyota	1:25.699	94.853
2	12	Sam Hornish Jr.	Penske Racing	Ford	1:25.855	94.681
3	33	Max Papis	Richard Childress Racing	Chevrolet	1:25.873	94.661
Full first practice results

=== Second practice ===
The second practice session would occur on Thursday, August 15, at 1:30 PM EST and would last for two hours and 30 minutes. A. J. Allmendinger of Penske Racing would set the fastest time in the session, with a lap of 1:25.074 and an average speed of 95.550 miles per hour (153.773 km/h).

Pos.	#	Driver	Team	Make	Time	Speed
1	22	A. J. Allmendinger (i)	Penske Racing	Ford	1:25.074	95.550
2	77	Parker Kligerman	Kyle Busch Motorsports	Toyota	1:25.170	95.442
3	54	Owen Kelly	Joe Gibbs Racing	Toyota	1:25.185	95.425
Full second practice results

=== Third practice ===
The third practice session would occur on Friday, August 16, at 11:300 PM EST and would last for one hour. Brian Vickers of Joe Gibbs Racing would set the fastest time in the session, with a lap of 1:24.614 and an average speed of 96.069 miles per hour (154.608 km/h).

Pos.	#	Driver	Team	Make	Time	Speed
1	20	Brian Vickers	Joe Gibbs Racing	Toyota	1:24.614	96.069
2	30	Nelson Piquet Jr. (R)	Turner Scott Motorsports	Chevrolet	1:25.079	95.544
3	22	A. J. Allmendinger (i)	Penske Racing	Ford	1:25.139	95.477
Full third practice results

=== Fourth and final practice ===
The fourth and final practice session, sometimes referred to as Happy Hour, would occur on Friday, August 16, at 1:30 PM EST and would last for two hours. Sam Hornish Jr. of Penske Racing would set the fastest time in the session, with a lap of 1:24.190 and an average speed of 96.553 miles per hour (155.387 km/h).

Pos.	#	Driver	Team	Make	Time	Speed
1	12	Sam Hornish Jr.	Penske Racing	Ford	1:24.190	96.553
2	20	Brian Vickers	Joe Gibbs Racing	Toyota	1:24.473	96.230
3	5	Ron Fellows (i)	JR Motorsports	Chevrolet	1:24.495	96.205
Full Happy Hour practice results

== Qualifying ==
Qualifying was held on Saturday, August 17, at 9:30 AM EST. Each driver would have one lap to set a time.

Michael McDowell of Joe Gibbs Racing would win the pole, setting a time of 1:24.450 and an average speed of 96.256 miles per hour (154.909 km/h).

Three drivers would fail to qualify: T. J. Bell, Dexter Stacey, and Tim Cowen.

=== Full qualifying results ===
Pos.	#	Driver	Team	Make	Time	Speed
1	18	Michael McDowell (i)	Joe Gibbs Racing	Toyota	1:24.450	96.256
2	22	A. J. Allmendinger (i)	Penske Racing	Ford	1:24.461	96.243
3	54	Owen Kelly	Joe Gibbs Racing	Toyota	1:24.551	96.141
4	32	Kyle Larson (R)	Turner Scott Motorsports	Chevrolet	1:24.571	96.118
5	30	Nelson Piquet Jr. (R)	Turner Scott Motorsports	Chevrolet	1:24.632	96.049
6	7	Regan Smith	JR Motorsports	Chevrolet	1:24.650	96.028
7	20	Brian Vickers	Joe Gibbs Racing	Toyota	1:24.660	96.017
8	12	Sam Hornish Jr.	Penske Racing	Ford	1:24.685	95.989
9	77	Parker Kligerman	Kyle Busch Motorsports	Toyota	1:24.899	95.747
10	33	Max Papis	Richard Childress Racing	Chevrolet	1:25.049	95.578
11	5	Ron Fellows (i)	JR Motorsports	Chevrolet	1:25.126	95.491
12	2	Brian Scott	Richard Childress Racing	Chevrolet	1:25.289	95.309
13	3	Austin Dillon	Richard Childress Racing	Chevrolet	1:25.361	95.229
14	11	Elliott Sadler	Joe Gibbs Racing	Toyota	1:25.513	95.059
15	31	Justin Allgaier	Turner Scott Motorsports	Chevrolet	1:25.629	94.930
16	53	Andrew Ranger	NDS Motorsports	Dodge	1:25.838	94.699
17	99	Alex Bowman (R)	RAB Racing	Toyota	1:25.989	94.533
18	60	Travis Pastrana	Roush Fenway Racing	Ford	1:26.362	94.125
19	9	Marcos Ambrose (i)	Richard Petty Motorsports	Ford	1:26.438	94.042
20	6	Trevor Bayne	Roush Fenway Racing	Ford	1:26.559	93.911
21	43	Michael Annett	Richard Petty Motorsports	Ford	1:26.642	93.821
22	24	Alex Kennedy (i)	SR² Motorsports	Toyota	1:27.055	93.375
23	51	Jeremy Clements	Jeremy Clements Racing	Chevrolet	1:27.274	93.141
24	14	Jeff Green	TriStar Motorsports	Toyota	1:27.344	93.066
25	15	Stanton Barrett	Rick Ware Racing	Ford	1:27.357	93.053
26	40	Reed Sorenson	The Motorsports Group	Chevrolet	1:27.373	93.036
27	87	Kyle Kelley	NEMCO Motorsports	Chevrolet	1:27.403	93.004
28	44	Chad Hackenbracht (i)	TriStar Motorsports	Toyota	1:27.500	92.901
29	75	Kenny Habul	SunEnergy1 Racing	Toyota	1:27.564	92.833
30	19	Mike Bliss	TriStar Motorsports	Toyota	1:27.861	92.519
31	73	Alx Danielsson	Creation-Cope Racing	Chevrolet	1:27.887	92.491
32	01	Mike Wallace	JD Motorsports	Chevrolet	1:28.275	92.085
33	52	Ryan Ellis	Jimmy Means Racing	Chevrolet	1:28.330	92.028
34	23	Anthony Gandon	Rick Ware Racing	Ford	1:28.502	91.849
35	10	Chase Miller	TriStar Motorsports	Toyota	1:28.609	91.738
36	74	Kevin O'Connell	Mike Harmon Racing	Chevrolet	1:28.872	91.466
37	79	Jeffrey Earnhardt (R)	Go Green Racing	Ford	1:29.135	91.196
Qualified by owner's points
38	70	Tomy Drissi (i)	ML Motorsports	Toyota	1:29.609	90.714
39	4	Kevin Lepage	JD Motorsports	Chevrolet	1:29.801	90.520
Last car to qualify on time
40	00	Blake Koch	SR² Motorsports	Toyota	1:29.301	91.027
Failed to qualify
41	42	T. J. Bell	The Motorsports Group	Chevrolet	1:29.405	90.921
42	46	Dexter Stacey	The Motorsports Group	Chevrolet	1:31.784	88.564
43	86	Tim Cowen	Deware Racing Group	Ford	—	—
Official starting lineup

== Race results ==
Fin	St	#	Driver	Team	Make	Laps	Led	Status	Pts	Winnings
1	2	22	A. J. Allmendinger (i)	Penske Racing	Ford	94	73	running	0	$49,350
2	1	18	Michael McDowell (i)	Joe Gibbs Racing	Toyota	94	8	running	0	$47,450
3	8	12	Sam Hornish Jr.	Penske Racing	Ford	94	3	running	42	$32,500
4	10	33	Max Papis	Richard Childress Racing	Chevrolet	94	5	running	41	$30,900
5	7	20	Brian Vickers	Joe Gibbs Racing	Toyota	94	0	running	39	$28,000
6	14	11	Elliott Sadler	Joe Gibbs Racing	Toyota	94	0	running	38	$23,500
7	19	9	Marcos Ambrose (i)	Richard Petty Motorsports	Ford	94	0	running	0	$15,250
8	15	31	Justin Allgaier	Turner Scott Motorsports	Chevrolet	94	2	running	37	$21,125
9	20	6	Trevor Bayne	Roush Fenway Racing	Ford	94	0	running	35	$20,250
10	23	51	Jeremy Clements	Jeremy Clements Racing	Chevrolet	94	0	running	34	$21,200
11	17	99	Alex Bowman (R)	RAB Racing	Toyota	94	0	running	33	$20,900
12	12	2	Brian Scott	Richard Childress Racing	Chevrolet	94	0	running	32	$19,825
13	9	77	Parker Kligerman	Kyle Busch Motorsports	Toyota	94	0	running	31	$19,725
14	4	32	Kyle Larson (R)	Turner Scott Motorsports	Chevrolet	94	0	running	30	$19,600
15	6	7	Regan Smith	JR Motorsports	Chevrolet	94	0	running	29	$20,500
16	16	53	Andrew Ranger	NDS Motorsports	Dodge	94	0	running	28	$13,650
17	30	19	Mike Bliss	TriStar Motorsports	Toyota	94	0	running	27	$19,350
18	37	79	Jeffrey Earnhardt (R)	Go Green Racing	Ford	94	0	running	26	$19,225
19	38	70	Tomy Drissi (i)	ML Motorsports	Toyota	94	0	running	0	$19,150
20	39	4	Kevin Lepage	JD Motorsports	Chevrolet	94	0	running	24	$19,775
21	13	3	Austin Dillon	Richard Childress Racing	Chevrolet	94	2	running	24	$19,025
22	21	43	Michael Annett	Richard Petty Motorsports	Ford	94	0	running	22	$18,985
23	3	54	Owen Kelly	Joe Gibbs Racing	Toyota	94	0	running	21	$18,950
24	24	14	Jeff Green	TriStar Motorsports	Toyota	94	0	running	20	$18,890
25	11	5	Ron Fellows (i)	JR Motorsports	Chevrolet	93	0	running	0	$19,295
26	29	75	Kenny Habul	SunEnergy1 Racing	Toyota	93	0	running	18	$12,785
27	5	30	Nelson Piquet Jr. (R)	Turner Scott Motorsports	Chevrolet	92	0	crash	17	$20,750
28	34	23	Anthony Gandon	Rick Ware Racing	Ford	91	0	running	16	$18,720
29	22	24	Alex Kennedy (i)	SR² Motorsports	Toyota	90	0	running	0	$18,685
30	28	44	Chad Hackenbracht (i)	TriStar Motorsports	Toyota	85	1	suspension	0	$18,940
31	18	60	Travis Pastrana	Roush Fenway Racing	Ford	85	0	running	13	$18,595
32	27	87	Kyle Kelley	NEMCO Motorsports	Chevrolet	78	0	engine	12	$18,550
33	32	01	Mike Wallace	JD Motorsports	Chevrolet	77	0	running	11	$18,520
34	36	74	Kevin O'Connell	Mike Harmon Racing	Chevrolet	69	0	engine	10	$12,500
35	25	15	Stanton Barrett	Rick Ware Racing	Ford	67	0	engine	9	$12,468
36	26	40	Reed Sorenson	The Motorsports Group	Chevrolet	62	0	engine	8	$17,655
37	31	73	Alx Danielsson	Creation-Cope Racing	Chevrolet	35	0	suspension	7	$11,635
38	33	52	Ryan Ellis	Jimmy Means Racing	Chevrolet	29	0	brakes	6	$11,616
39	35	10	Chase Miller	TriStar Motorsports	Toyota	3	0	vibration	5	$11,475
40	40	00	Blake Koch	SR² Motorsports	Toyota	2	0	vibration	4	$11,338
Failed to qualify
41		42	T. J. Bell	The Motorsports Group	Chevrolet					
42		46	Dexter Stacey	The Motorsports Group	Chevrolet					
43		86	Tim Cowen	Deware Racing Group	Ford					
Official race results

== Standings after the race ==
Drivers' Championship standings

Pos	Driver	Points
1	Sam Hornish Jr.	769
2	Elliott Sadler	756 (-13)
3	Regan Smith	754 (-15)
4	Austin Dillon	754 (–15)
5	Brian Vickers	751 (–18)
6	Justin Allgaier	722 (–47)
7	Brian Scott	706 (–63)
8	Trevor Bayne	696 (–73)
9	Kyle Larson	695 (–74)
10	Parker Kligerman	687 (–82)
11	Alex Bowman	617 (–152)
12	Nelson Piquet Jr.	589 (–180)
Official driver's standings

- Note: Only the first 12 positions are included for the driver standings.

Previous race: 2013 Zippo 200 at The Glen	NASCAR Nationwide Series; 2013 season	Next race: 2013 Food City 250
