= Ricky Ehrgott =

American racing driver

- Born: December 2, 1987 (age 38); Brandon, Florida, U.S.

NASCAR O'Reilly Auto Parts Series career
- 1 race run over 1 year
- Best finish: 126th (2013)
- First race: 2013 Virginia 529 College Savings 250 (Richmond)
Wins	Top tens	Poles
0	0	0

NASCAR FedEx Freight Truck Series career
- 1 race run over 1 year
- Best finish: 83rd (2013)
- First race: 2013 Pocono Mountains 125 (Pocono)
Wins	Top tens	Poles
0	0	0

ARCA Menards Series career
- 4 races run over 2 years
- Best finish: 65th (2013)
- First race: 2012 Berlin ARCA 200 Presented by Hantz Group (Berlin)
- Last race: 2013 International Motorsports Hall of Fame 250 (Talladega)
Wins	Top tens	Poles
0	2	0
- Statistics up to date as of January 20, 2025.

Ricky Ehrgott (born December 2, 1987) is an American former professional stock car racing driver who has competed in the NASCAR Nationwide Series, the NASCAR Camping World Truck Series, and the ARCA Racing Series.

Ehrgott has also previously competed in the USAC National Midget Series, the USAC Regional Midget Series, the USAC Indiana Ford Focus Midget Car Series, and the USAC Speedrome Ford Focus Midget Car Series.

== Motorsports results ==
=== NASCAR ===
(key) (Bold - Pole position awarded by qualifying time. Italics - Pole position earned by points standings or practice time. * – Most laps led.)

==== Nationwide Series ====
NASCAR Nationwide Series results
Year	Team	No.	Make	1	2	3	4	5	6	7	8	9	10	11	12	13	14	15	16	17	18	19	20	21	22	23	24	25	26	27	28	29	30	31	32	33	NNSC	Pts	Ref
2013	Deware Racing Group	86	Chevy	DAY	PHO	LVS	BRI	CAL	TEX	RCH	TAL	DAR	CLT	DOV	IOW	MCH	ROA	KEN	DAY	NHA	CHI	IND	IOW	GLN	MOH	BRI	ATL	RCH; 33	CHI	KEN	DOV	KAN	CLT	TEX	PHO	HOM	126th	0^{1}	

==== Camping World Truck Series ====
NASCAR Camping World Truck Series results
Year	Team	No.	Make	1	2	3	4	5	6	7	8	9	10	11	12	13	14	15	16	17	18	19	20	21	22	NCWTC	Pts	Ref
2013	SS-Green Light Racing	81	Toyota	DAY	MAR	CAR	KAN	CLT	DOV	TEX	KEN	IOW	ELD	POC; 36	MCH	BRI	MSP	IOW	CHI	LVS	TAL	MAR	TEX	PHO	HOM	83rd	8	

=== ARCA Racing Series ===
(key) (Bold – Pole position awarded by qualifying time. Italics – Pole position earned by points standings or practice time. * – Most laps led.)

ARCA Racing Series results
Year	Team	No.	Make	1	2	3	4	5	6	7	8	9	10	11	12	13	14	15	16	17	18	19	20	21	ARSC	Pts	Ref
2012	McClure Motorsports	10	Chevy	DAY	MOB	SLM	TAL	TOL	ELK	POC	MCH	WIN	NJE	IOW	CHI	IRP	POC	BLN; 16	ISF	MAD	SLM	DSF			83rd	230	
2012	Allgaier Motorsports	36	Dodge																				KAN; 30		83rd	230	
2013	Coulter Motorsports	16	Chevy	DAY; 3	MOB	SLM																			65th	400	
2013	Eddie Sharp Racing	6	Chevy				TAL; 9	TOL	ELK	POC	MCH	ROA	WIN	CHI	NJE	POC	BLN	ISF	MAD	DSF	IOW	SLM	KEN	KAN	65th	400	
