= Tim Cowen =

American racing driver (born 1958)

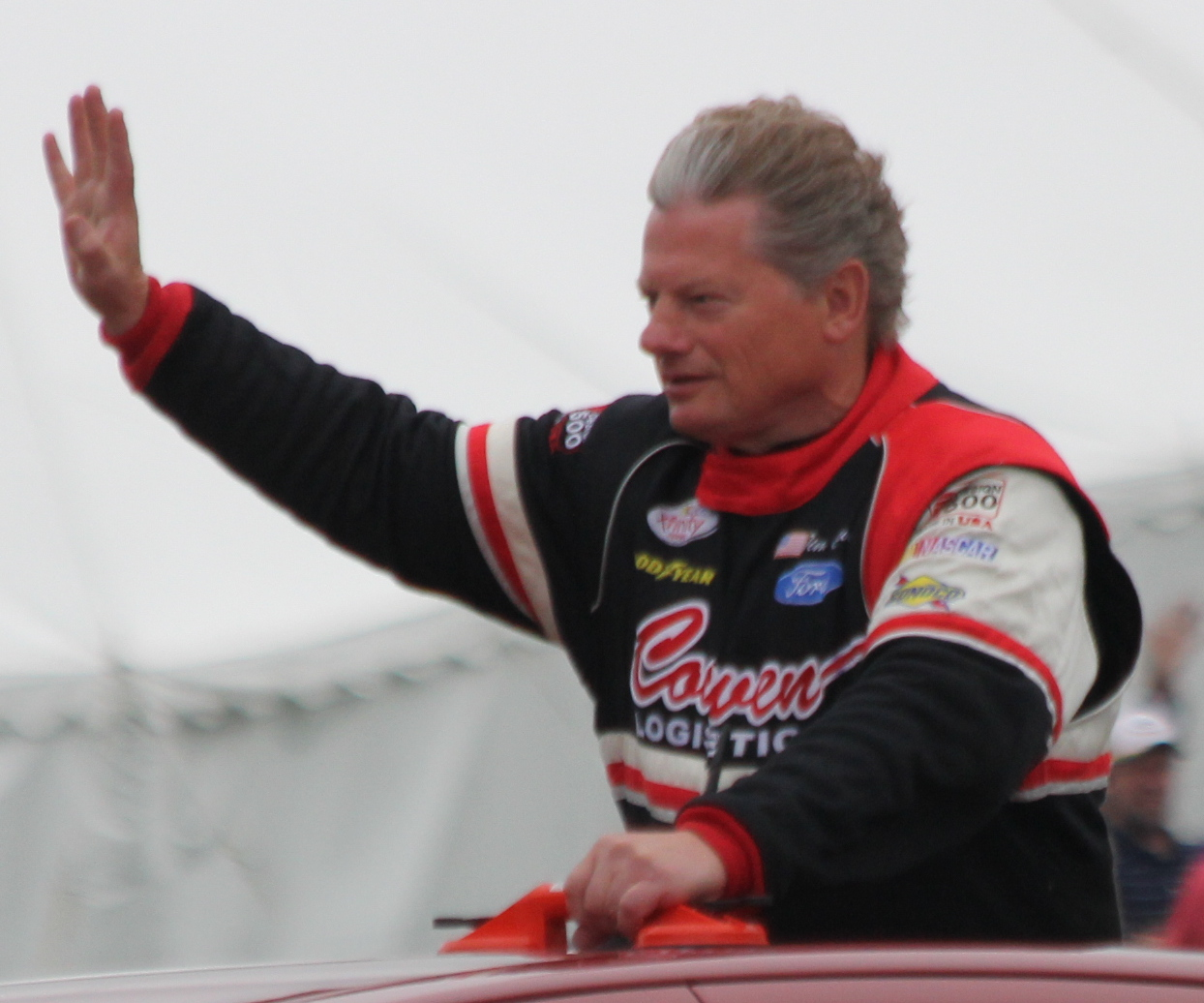
- Cowen at Road America in 2015
- Born: August 18, 1958 (age 68); Loudonville, Ohio, U.S.

NASCAR O'Reilly Auto Parts Series career
- 7 races run over 6 years
- 2018 position: 71st
- Best finish: 60th (2017)
- First race: 2014 Nationwide Children's Hospital 200 (Mid-Ohio)
- Last race: 2018 Rock N Roll Tequila 170 (Mid-Ohio)
Wins	Top tens	Poles
0	0	0

NASCAR FedEx Freight Truck Series career
- 4 races run over 2 years
- 2008 position: 61st
- Best finish: 61st (2008)
- First race: 2007 City of Mansfield 250 (Mansfield)
- Last race: 2008 O'Reilly 250 (Memphis)
Wins	Top tens	Poles
0	0	0
- Statistics up to date as of November 17, 2018.

Tim Cowen (born August 18, 1958) is an American professional stock car racing driver. He last competed part-time in the NASCAR Xfinity Series, driving the No. 66 Ford Mustang for MBM Motorsports.

== Early life ==
Cowen was born in Loudonville, Ohio and grew up in Perrysville. Sports were prominent in his life and he was initially interested in football before switching to racing.

== Racing career ==
=== NASCAR Xfinity Series ===
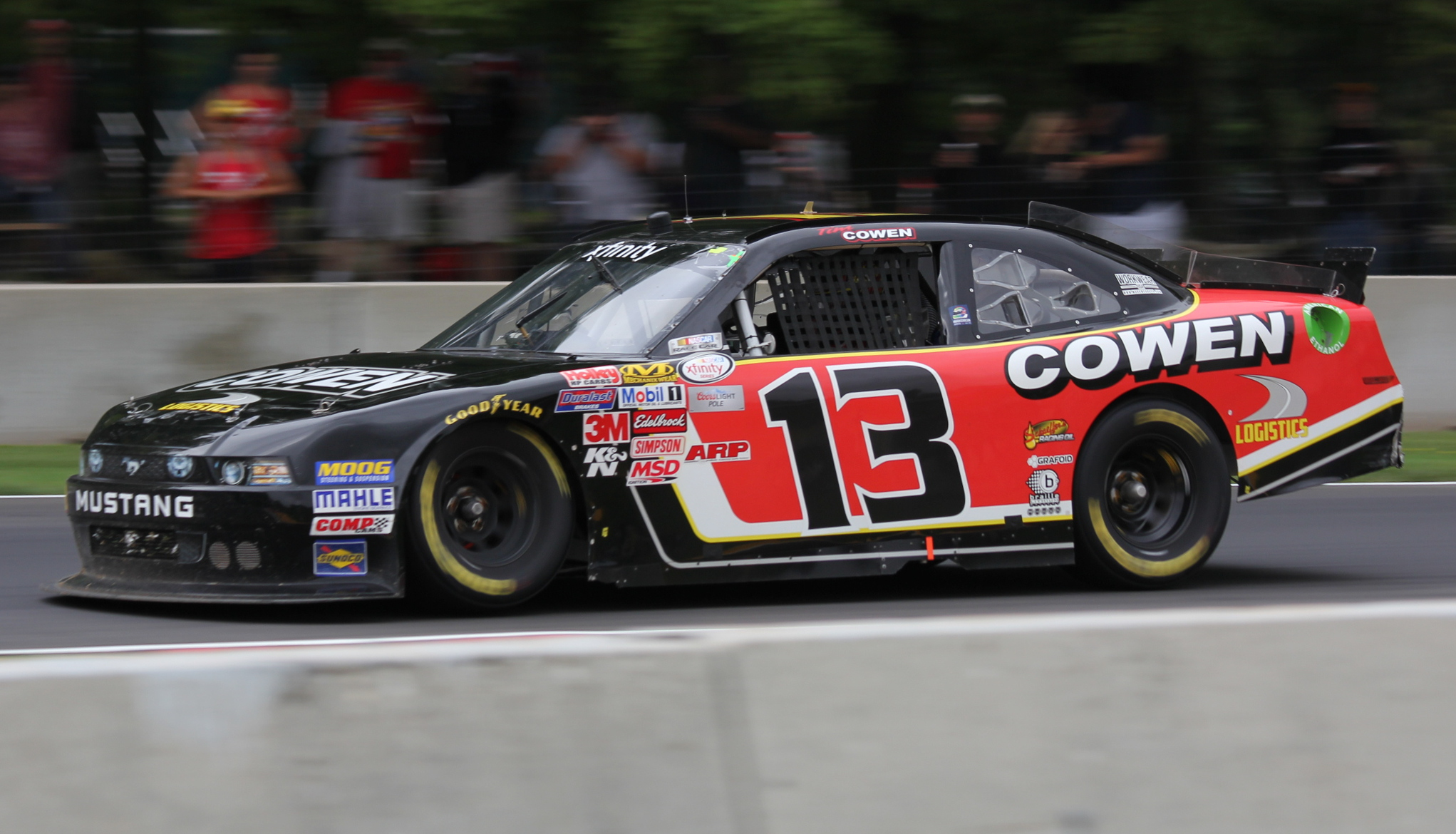
2015 car at Road America

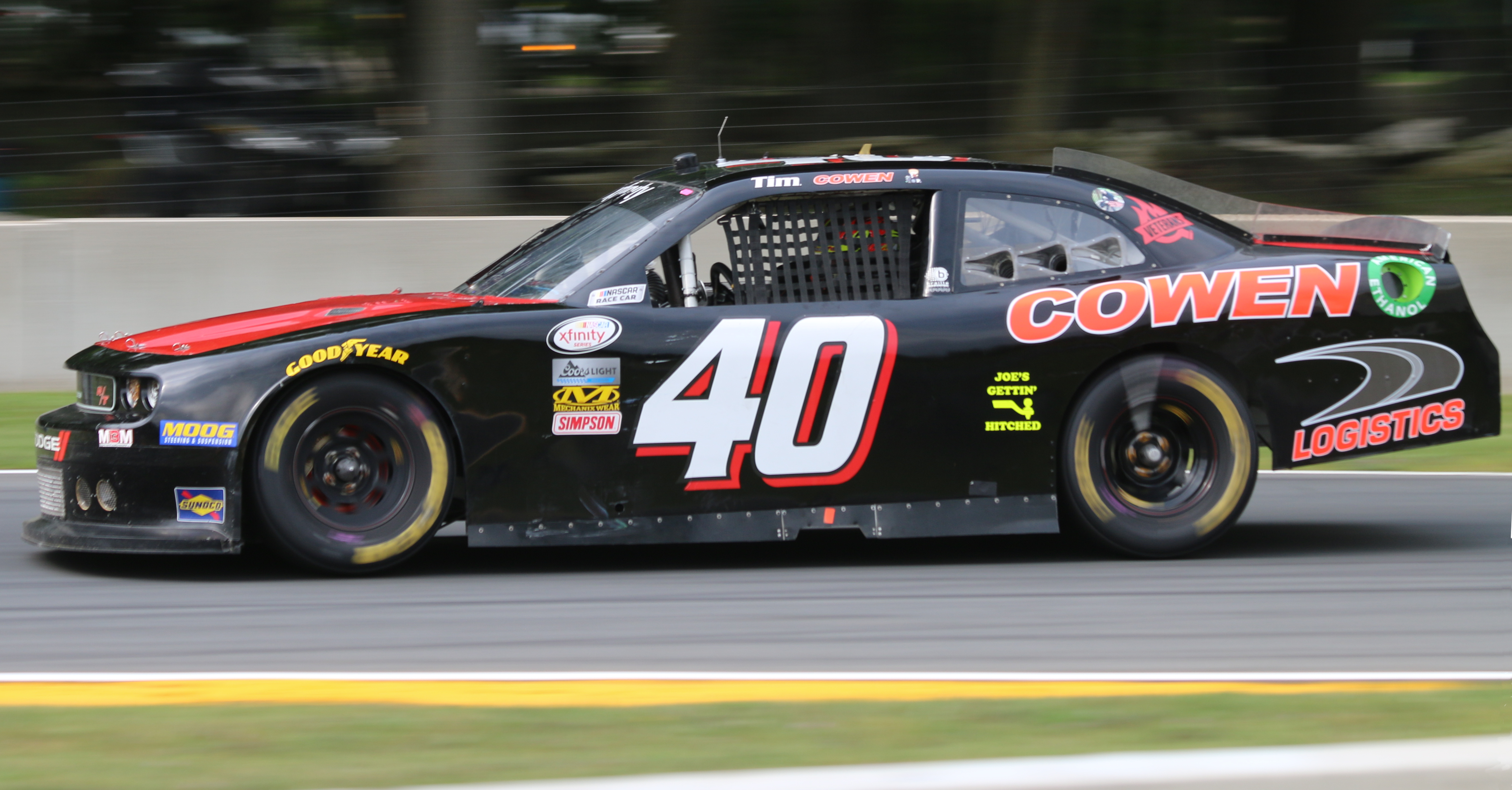
2017 car at Road America

Cowen began racing in the Xfinity Series in 2014 at Mid-Ohio, where he drove the No. 86 Ford. He started 30th and finished 18th.

In 2015, Cowen drove the No. 13 Ford in the Mid-Ohio and Road America races. He finished 30th at Ohio and 25th at Road America.

In 2016, Cowen ran the Mid-Ohio race in the No. 13 Ford, but a crash took him out of the race, leading to a 37th-place finish.

In 2017, Cowen would again run the Mid-Ohio and Road America races. At Mid-Ohio, he drove the No. 40 Ford and finished 20th. At Road America, he drove the No. 40 Dodge and finished 36th due to a crash.

In 2018, Cowen drove the No. 66 Ford Mustang for MBM Motorsports and finished 26th at Mid-Ohio.

=== NASCAR Craftsman Truck Series ===
Cowen made his Truck Series debut in 2007, driving the No. 42 Ford F-150 for his own team, Cowen Racing. He planned to run the two races at Martinsville and the Mansfield race, but only successfully qualified for and ran the latter.

Cowen returned to the Truck Series in 2008, running three races (Martinsville, Mansfield, and Memphis) for his team.

== Motorsports career results ==
=== NASCAR ===
(key) (Bold – Pole position awarded by qualifying time. Italics – Pole position earned by points standings or practice time. * – Most laps led.)

==== Xfinity Series ====
NASCAR Xfinity Series results
Year	Team	No.	Make	1	2	3	4	5	6	7	8	9	10	11	12	13	14	15	16	17	18	19	20	21	22	23	24	25	26	27	28	29	30	31	32	33	NXSC	Pts	Ref
2014	Deware Racing Group	86	Ford	DAY	PHO	LVS	BRI	CAL	TEX	DAR	RCH	TAL	IOW	CLT	DOV	MCH	ROA	KEN	DAY	NHA	CHI	IND	IOW	GLN	MOH; 18	BRI	ATL	RCH	CHI	KEN	DOV	KAN	CLT	TEX	PHO	HOM	63rd	26	
2015	MBM Motorsports	13	Ford	DAY	ATL	LVS	PHO	CAL	TEX	BRI	RCH	TAL	IOW	CLT	DOV	MCH	CHI	DAY	KEN	NHA	IND	IOW	GLN	MOH; 30	BRI	ROA; 25	DAR	RCH	CHI	KEN	DOV	CLT	KAN	TEX	PHO	HOM	61st	33	
2016	MBM Motorsports	13	Ford	DAY	ATL	LVS	PHO	CAL	TEX	BRI	RCH	TAL	DOV	CLT	POC	MCH	IOW	DAY	KEN	NHA	IND	IOW	GLN	MOH; 37	BRI	ROA	DAR	RCH	CHI	KEN	DOV	CLT	KAN	TEX	PHO	HOM	81st	4	
2017	MBM Motorsports	40	Ford	DAY	ATL	LVS	PHO	CAL	TEX	BRI	RCH	TAL	CLT	DOV	POC	MCH	IOW	DAY	KEN	NHA	IND	IOW	GLN	MOH; 20	BRI												60th	18	
2017	MBM Motorsports	40	Dodge																							ROA; 36	DAR	RCH	CHI	KEN	DOV	CLT	KAN	TEX	PHO	HOM	60th	18	
2018	MBM Motorsports	66	Ford	DAY	ATL	LVS	PHO	CAL	TEX	BRI	RCH	TAL	DOV	CLT	POC	MCH	IOW	CHI	DAY	KEN	NHA	IOW	GLN	MOH; 26	BRI	ROA	DAR	IND	LVS	RCH	CLT	DOV	KAN	TEX	PHO	HOM	71st	11	

==== Craftsman Truck Series ====
NASCAR Craftsman Truck Series results
Year	Team	No.	Make	1	2	3	4	5	6	7	8	9	10	11	12	13	14	15	16	17	18	19	20	21	22	23	24	25	NCTC	Pts	Ref
2007	Cowen Racing	42	Ford	DAY	CAL	ATL	MAR; DNQ	KAN	CLT	MFD; 30	DOV	TEX	MCH	MLW	MEM	KEN	IRP	NSH	BRI	GTW	NHA	LVS	TAL	MAR; DNQ	ATL	TEX	PHO	HOM	97th	73	
2008	Cowen Racing	42	Ford	DAY	CAL	ATL	MAR; 33	KAN	CLT	MFD; 36	DOV	TEX	MCH	MLW	MEM; 28	KEN	IRP	NSH	BRI	GTW	NHA	LVS	TAL	MAR	ATL	TEX	PHO	HOM	61st	198	

==== Camping World East Series ====
NASCAR Camping World East Series results
Year	Team	No.	Make	1	2	3	4	5	6	7	8	9	10	11	12	13	NCWESC	Pts	Ref
2006	Cowen Racing	75	Ford	GRE	STA	HOL	TMP	LER; 15	NHA	ADI; 21	WFD; 18	NHA; 29	DOV	LRP			30th	403	
2007	Cowen Racing	75	Ford	GRE; DNQ	ELK	IOW	SBO	STA	NHA	TMP	NSH; DNQ	ADI	LRP	MFD; 27	NHA	DOV	60th	129	
2008	Cowen Racing	75	Ford	GRE	IOW	SBO	GLN; 9	NHA	TMP	NSH	ADI	LRP; 16	MFD; 17	NHA	DOV	STA	34th	369	
2009	Cowen Racing	75	Ford	GRE	TRI	IOW	SBO	GLN	NHA	TMP	ADI	LRP; 22	NHA	DOV			NA	–	

=== ARCA Racing Series ===
(key) (Bold – Pole position awarded by qualifying time. Italics – Pole position earned by points standings or practice time. * – Most laps led.)

ARCA Racing Series results
Year	Team	No.	Make	1	2	3	4	5	6	7	8	9	10	11	12	13	14	15	16	17	18	19	20	21	ARSC	Pts	Ref
2010	Cowen Racing	80	Ford	DAY	PBE; 9	SLM	TEX	TAL	TOL; 17	POC	MCH	IOW	MFD; 15	POC	BLN	NJE; 22	ISF	CHI	DSF	TOL	SLM	KAN	CAR		41st	605	
2011	Cowen Racing	83	Ford	DAY	TAL	SLM	TOL; 17	NJE; 12	CHI	POC	MCH	WIN	BLN	IOW	IRP; DNQ	POC	ISF	MAD	DSF	SLM	KAN	TOL; 28			57th	430	
2012	Cowen Racing	83	Ford	DAY	MOB	SLM	TAL	TOL; 19	ELK	POC	MCH	WIN	NJE; 20	IOW	CHI	IRP	POC	BLN	ISF	MAD	SLM	DSF	KAN		75th	265	
2013	Cowen Racing	83	Ford	DAY	MOB	SLM	TAL	TOL	ELK	POC	MCH	ROA	WIN	CHI	NJE; 20	POC	BLN	ISF	MAD	DSF	IOW	SLM	KEN	KAN	125th	130	

^{*} Season still in progress
^{1} Ineligible for series points
