= 2013 Food City 250 =

23rd race of the 2013 NASCAR Nationwide Series

Race details
- Race 23 of 33 of the 2013 NASCAR Nationwide Series
- Date: August 23, 2013
- Official name: 32nd Annual Food City 250
- Location: Bristol, Tennessee, Bristol Motor Speedway
- Course: Permanent racing facility
- Course length: 0.533 miles (0.858 km)
- Distance: 250 laps, 133.25 mi (214.445 km)
- Scheduled distance: 250 laps, 133.25 mi (214.445 km)
- Average speed: 91.985 miles per hour (148.036 km/h)

Pole position
Driver	Kyle Busch	Joe Gibbs Racing
- Time: 15.354

Most laps led
Driver	Kyle Busch	Joe Gibbs Racing
- Laps: 228

Winner
No. 54	Kyle Busch	Joe Gibbs Racing

Television in the United States
- Network: ESPN
- Announcers: Allen Bestwick, Dale Jarrett, Andy Petree

Radio in the United States
- Radio: Performance Racing Network

The 2013 Food City 250 was the 23rd stock car race of the 2013 NASCAR Nationwide Series and the 32nd iteration of the event. The race was held on Friday, August 23, 2013, in Bristol, Tennessee, at Bristol Motor Speedway, a 0.533 miles (0.858 km) permanent oval-shaped racetrack. The race took the scheduled 250 laps to complete. At race's end, Kyle Busch, driving for Joe Gibbs Racing, would dominate the race to win his 60th career NASCAR Nationwide Series win and his ninth win of the season. To fill out the podium, Brad Keselowski of Penske Racing and Austin Dillon of Richard Childress Racing would finish second and third, respectively.

== Background ==
The layout of Bristol Motor Speedway, the venue where the race was held.

The Bristol Motor Speedway, formerly known as Bristol International Raceway and Bristol Raceway, is a NASCAR short track venue located in Bristol, Tennessee. Constructed in 1960, it held its first NASCAR race on July 30, 1961. Despite its short length, Bristol is among the most popular tracks on the NASCAR schedule because of its distinct features, which include extraordinarily steep banking, an all concrete surface, two pit roads, and stadium-like seating. It has also been named one of the loudest NASCAR tracks.

=== Entry list ===
- (R) denotes rookie driver.
- (i) denotes driver who is ineligible for series driver points.

#	Driver	Team	Make	Sponsor
00	Michael McDowell	SR² Motorsports	Toyota	SR² Motorsports
01	Mike Wallace	JD Motorsports	Chevrolet	G&K Services
2	Brian Scott	Richard Childress Racing	Chevrolet	Husky Liners
3	Austin Dillon	Richard Childress Racing	Chevrolet	AdvoCare
4	Landon Cassill	JD Motorsports	Chevrolet	Flex Seal
5	Kasey Kahne (i)	JR Motorsports	Chevrolet	Great Clips
6	Trevor Bayne	Roush Fenway Racing	Ford	Ford EcoBoost
7	Regan Smith	JR Motorsports	Chevrolet	TaxSlayer
10	Cole Whitt	TriStar Motorsports	Toyota	Gold Bond
11	Elliott Sadler	Joe Gibbs Racing	Toyota	OneMain Financial
12	Sam Hornish Jr.	Penske Racing	Ford	Snap-on
14	Jeff Green	TriStar Motorsports	Toyota	Hefty, Reynolds Wrap
15	Carl Long	Rick Ware Racing	Chevrolet	Qolix
16	Ryan Reed	Roush Fenway Racing	Ford	Drive to Stop Diabetes
17	David Starr (i)	Vision Racing	Toyota	National Cash Lenders
18	Drew Herring	Joe Gibbs Racing	Toyota	Z-Line Designs
19	Mike Bliss	TriStar Motorsports	Toyota	Tweaker Energy Shot
20	Brian Vickers	Joe Gibbs Racing	Toyota	Dollar General
21	Brendan Gaughan (i)	Richard Childress Racing	Chevrolet	South Point Hotel, Casino & Spa
22	Brad Keselowski (i)	Penske Racing	Ford	Discount Tire
23	Robert Richardson Jr.	R3 Motorsports	Chevrolet	North Texas Pipe
24	Blake Koch	SR² Motorsports	Toyota	SupportMilitary.org, M&W Transportation
29	Kenny Wallace	RAB Racing	Toyota	American Ethanol
30	Nelson Piquet Jr. (R)	Turner Scott Motorsports	Chevrolet	Worx Yard Tools
31	Justin Allgaier	Turner Scott Motorsports	Chevrolet	Brandt Professional Agriculture
32	Kyle Larson (R)	Turner Scott Motorsports	Chevrolet	Cottonelle
33	Ty Dillon (i)	Richard Childress Racing	Chevrolet	WESCO
37	Matt DiBenedetto	Vision Racing	Dodge	National Cash Lenders
40	Reed Sorenson	The Motorsports Group	Chevrolet	Swisher E-Cigarette
42	Josh Wise	The Motorsports Group	Chevrolet	The Motorsports Group
43	Michael Annett	Richard Petty Motorsports	Ford	Pilot Travel Centers, Jack Link's
44	Chad Hackenbracht (i)	TriStar Motorsports	Toyota	Tastee Apple
46	J. J. Yeley (i)	The Motorsports Group	Chevrolet	The Motorsports Group
47	T. J. Bell*	The Motorsports Group	Chevrolet	The Motorsports Group
51	Jeremy Clements	Jeremy Clements Racing	Chevrolet	All South Electric, Value Lighting
52	Joey Gase	Jimmy Means Racing	Toyota	Jimmy Means Racing
54	Kyle Busch (i)	Joe Gibbs Racing	Toyota	Monster Energy
60	Travis Pastrana	Roush Fenway Racing	Ford	Roush Fenway Racing
70	Brad Teague	ML Motorsports	Toyota	JD Metals, SCAG Power Equipment
74	Mike Harmon	Mike Harmon Racing	Dodge	Paxco Quality Race Car Refinishing
77	Parker Kligerman	Kyle Busch Motorsports	Toyota	Toyota
79	Kyle Fowler	Go Green Racing	Ford	Techniweld
86	Kevin Lepage	Deware Racing Group	Chevrolet	Qello
87	Joe Nemechek	NEMCO Motorsports	Toyota	Wood Pellet Grills
89	Morgan Shepherd	Shepherd Racing Ventures	Chevrolet	King's Tire, Racing with Jesus
90	Martin Roy	King Autosport	Chevrolet	Caribou Hunting
91	Chase Miller	TriStar Motorsports	Toyota	TriStar Motorsports
98	Kevin Swindell (R)	Biagi-DenBeste Racing	Ford	Carroll Shelby Engine Co., DenBeste Water Solutions
99	Alex Bowman (R)	RAB Racing	Toyota	ToyotaCare
Official entry list

*Withdrew prior to the event.

== Practice ==
The only two-hour and 50-minute practice session was held on Friday, August 23, at 9:00 a.m. EST. Brian Scott of Richard Childress Racing would set the fastest time in the session, with a lap of 15.541 and an average speed of 123.467 miles per hour (198.701 km/h).

Pos.	#	Driver	Team	Make	Time	Speed
1	2	Brian Scott	Richard Childress Racing	Chevrolet	15.541	123.467
2	31	Justin Allgaier	Turner Scott Motorsports	Chevrolet	15.576	123.190
3	33	Ty Dillon (i)	Richard Childress Racing	Chevrolet	15.579	123.166
Full practice results

== Qualifying ==
Qualifying was held on Friday, August 23, at 3:40 p.m. EST. Each driver would have two laps to set a fastest time; the fastest of the two would count as their official qualifying lap.

Kyle Busch of Joe Gibbs Racing would win the pole, setting a time of 15.354 and an average speed of 124.971 miles per hour (201.121 km/h).

Eight drivers would fail to qualify: Joey Gase, Kevin Lepage, David Starr, Carl Long, Michael McDowell, Mike Harmon, Martin Roy, and Morgan Shepherd.

=== Full qualifying results ===
Pos.	#	Driver	Team	Make	Time	Speed
1	54	Kyle Busch (i)	Joe Gibbs Racing	Toyota	15.354	124.971
2	2	Brian Scott	Richard Childress Racing	Chevrolet	15.366	124.873
3	33	Ty Dillon (i)	Richard Childress Racing	Chevrolet	15.368	124.857
4	31	Justin Allgaier	Turner Scott Motorsports	Chevrolet	15.382	124.743
5	32	Kyle Larson (R)	Turner Scott Motorsports	Chevrolet	15.393	124.654
6	3	Austin Dillon	Richard Childress Racing	Chevrolet	15.474	124.002
7	7	Regan Smith	JR Motorsports	Chevrolet	15.521	123.626
8	6	Trevor Bayne	Roush Fenway Racing	Ford	15.521	123.626
9	20	Brian Vickers	Joe Gibbs Racing	Toyota	15.526	123.586
10	77	Parker Kligerman	Kyle Busch Motorsports	Toyota	15.526	123.586
11	60	Travis Pastrana	Roush Fenway Racing	Ford	15.552	123.380
12	18	Drew Herring	Joe Gibbs Racing	Toyota	15.555	123.356
13	12	Sam Hornish Jr.	Penske Racing	Ford	15.557	123.340
14	99	Alex Bowman (R)	RAB Racing	Toyota	15.564	123.285
15	22	Brad Keselowski (i)	Penske Racing	Ford	15.565	123.277
16	5	Kasey Kahne (i)	JR Motorsports	Chevrolet	15.582	123.142
17	10	Cole Whitt	TriStar Motorsports	Toyota	15.587	123.103
18	19	Mike Bliss	TriStar Motorsports	Toyota	15.617	122.866
19	29	Kenny Wallace	RAB Racing	Toyota	15.630	122.764
20	21	Brendan Gaughan (i)	Richard Childress Racing	Chevrolet	15.642	122.670
21	43	Michael Annett	Richard Petty Motorsports	Ford	15.650	122.607
22	30	Nelson Piquet Jr. (R)	Turner Scott Motorsports	Chevrolet	15.679	122.380
23	98	Kevin Swindell (R)	Biagi-DenBeste Racing	Ford	15.697	122.240
24	87	Joe Nemechek	NEMCO Motorsports	Toyota	15.705	122.178
25	11	Elliott Sadler	Joe Gibbs Racing	Toyota	15.723	122.038
26	44	Chad Hackenbracht (i)	TriStar Motorsports	Toyota	15.732	121.968
27	16	Ryan Reed	Roush Fenway Racing	Ford	15.733	121.960
28	79	Kyle Fowler	Go Green Racing	Ford	15.772	121.659
29	14	Jeff Green	TriStar Motorsports	Toyota	15.772	121.659
30	51	Jeremy Clements	Jeremy Clements Racing	Chevrolet	15.783	121.574
31	40	Reed Sorenson	The Motorsports Group	Chevrolet	15.803	121.420
32	42	Josh Wise	The Motorsports Group	Chevrolet	15.810	121.366
33	37	Matt DiBenedetto	Vision Racing	Dodge	15.895	120.717
34	91	Chase Miller	TriStar Motorsports	Toyota	15.909	120.611
35	01	Mike Wallace	JD Motorsports	Chevrolet	15.975	120.113
36	4	Landon Cassill	JD Motorsports	Chevrolet	15.975	120.113
Qualified by owner's points
37	24	Blake Koch	SR² Motorsports	Toyota	16.071	119.395
38	23	Robert Richardson Jr.	R3 Motorsports	Chevrolet	16.414	116.900
39	70	Brad Teague	ML Motorsports	Toyota	17.154	111.857
Last car to qualify on time
40	46	J. J. Yeley (i)	The Motorsports Group	Chevrolet	15.950	120.301
Failed to qualify or withdrew
41	52	Joey Gase	Jimmy Means Racing	Chevrolet	15.951	120.293
42	86	Kevin Lepage	Deware Racing Group	Chevrolet	15.968	120.165
43	17	David Starr (i)	Vision Racing	Toyota	15.988	120.015
44	15	Carl Long	Rick Ware Racing	Chevrolet	16.025	119.738
45	00	Michael McDowell (i)	SR² Motorsports	Toyota	16.080	119.328
46	74	Mike Harmon	Mike Harmon Racing	Dodge	16.373	117.193
47	90	Martin Roy	King Autosport	Chevrolet	16.498	116.305
48	89	Morgan Shepherd	Shepherd Racing Ventures	Chevrolet	16.585	115.695
WD	47	T. J. Bell	The Motorsports Group	Chevrolet	—	—
Official starting lineup

== Race results ==
Fin	St	#	Driver	Team	Make	Laps	Led	Status	Pts	Winnings
1	1	54	Kyle Busch (i)	Joe Gibbs Racing	Toyota	250	228	running	0	$53,315
2	15	22	Brad Keselowski (i)	Penske Racing	Ford	250	0	running	0	$37,650
3	6	3	Austin Dillon	Richard Childress Racing	Chevrolet	250	0	running	41	$36,975
4	4	31	Justin Allgaier	Turner Scott Motorsports	Chevrolet	250	0	running	40	$34,225
5	5	32	Kyle Larson (R)	Turner Scott Motorsports	Chevrolet	250	22	running	40	$29,650
6	8	6	Trevor Bayne	Roush Fenway Racing	Ford	250	0	running	38	$26,800
7	3	33	Ty Dillon (i)	Richard Childress Racing	Chevrolet	250	0	running	0	$26,035
8	16	5	Kasey Kahne (i)	JR Motorsports	Chevrolet	250	0	running	0	$19,895
9	2	2	Brian Scott	Richard Childress Racing	Chevrolet	250	0	running	35	$25,650
10	25	11	Elliott Sadler	Joe Gibbs Racing	Toyota	249	0	running	34	$27,400
11	21	43	Michael Annett	Richard Petty Motorsports	Ford	248	0	running	33	$25,375
12	13	12	Sam Hornish Jr.	Penske Racing	Ford	248	0	running	32	$25,075
13	11	60	Travis Pastrana	Roush Fenway Racing	Ford	248	0	running	31	$24,975
14	17	10	Cole Whitt	TriStar Motorsports	Toyota	248	0	running	30	$18,910
15	20	21	Brendan Gaughan (i)	Richard Childress Racing	Chevrolet	248	0	running	0	$20,040
16	29	14	Jeff Green	TriStar Motorsports	Toyota	248	0	running	28	$24,830
17	18	19	Mike Bliss	TriStar Motorsports	Toyota	247	0	running	27	$24,785
18	24	87	Joe Nemechek	NEMCO Motorsports	Toyota	246	0	running	26	$24,740
19	19	29	Kenny Wallace	RAB Racing	Toyota	246	0	running	25	$18,705
20	26	44	Chad Hackenbracht (i)	TriStar Motorsports	Toyota	246	0	running	0	$25,340
21	7	7	Regan Smith	JR Motorsports	Chevrolet	246	0	running	23	$24,600
22	30	51	Jeremy Clements	Jeremy Clements Racing	Chevrolet	246	0	running	22	$24,555
23	36	4	Landon Cassill	JD Motorsports	Chevrolet	246	0	running	21	$24,495
24	22	30	Nelson Piquet Jr. (R)	Turner Scott Motorsports	Chevrolet	246	0	running	20	$24,460
25	23	98	Kevin Swindell (R)	Biagi-DenBeste Racing	Ford	246	0	running	19	$24,875
26	27	16	Ryan Reed	Roush Fenway Racing	Ford	245	0	running	18	$24,335
27	35	01	Mike Wallace	JD Motorsports	Chevrolet	245	0	running	17	$24,275
28	31	40	Reed Sorenson	The Motorsports Group	Chevrolet	245	0	running	16	$24,185
29	28	79	Kyle Fowler	Go Green Racing	Ford	244	0	running	15	$24,145
30	38	23	Robert Richardson Jr.	R3 Motorsports	Chevrolet	242	0	running	14	$24,400
31	37	24	Blake Koch	SR² Motorsports	Toyota	241	0	running	13	$24,065
32	39	70	Brad Teague	ML Motorsports	Toyota	241	0	running	12	$24,010
33	14	99	Alex Bowman (R)	RAB Racing	Toyota	234	0	running	11	$23,980
34	9	20	Brian Vickers	Joe Gibbs Racing	Toyota	194	0	running	10	$23,950
35	10	77	Parker Kligerman	Kyle Busch Motorsports	Toyota	165	0	crash	9	$23,919
36	12	18	Drew Herring	Joe Gibbs Racing	Toyota	151	0	crash	8	$22,615
37	33	37	Matt DiBenedetto	Vision Racing	Dodge	67	0	brakes	7	$16,595
38	40	46	J. J. Yeley (i)	The Motorsports Group	Chevrolet	7	0	handling	0	$16,556
39	34	91	Chase Miller	TriStar Motorsports	Toyota	5	0	vibration	5	$16,455
40	32	42	Josh Wise	The Motorsports Group	Chevrolet	4	0	vibration	4	$16,430
Failed to qualify or withdrew
41		52	Joey Gase	Jimmy Means Racing	Chevrolet					
42		86	Kevin Lepage	Deware Racing Group	Chevrolet					
43		17	David Starr (i)	Vision Racing	Toyota					
44		15	Carl Long	Rick Ware Racing	Chevrolet					
45		00	Michael McDowell (i)	SR² Motorsports	Toyota					
46		74	Mike Harmon	Mike Harmon Racing	Dodge					
47		90	Martin Roy	King Autosport	Chevrolet					
48		89	Morgan Shepherd	Shepherd Racing Ventures	Chevrolet					
WD		47	T. J. Bell	The Motorsports Group	Chevrolet					
Official race results

== Standings after the race ==
Drivers' Championship standings

Pos	Driver	Points
1	Sam Hornish Jr.	801
2	Austin Dillon	795 (-6)
3	Elliott Sadler	790 (-11)
4	Regan Smith	777 (–24)
5	Justin Allgaier	762 (–39)
6	Brian Vickers	761 (–40)
7	Brian Scott	741 (–60)
8	Kyle Larson	735 (–66)
9	Trevor Bayne	734 (–67)
10	Parker Kligerman	696 (–105)
11	Alex Bowman	628 (–173)
12	Nelson Piquet Jr.	608 (–192)
Official driver's standings

- Note: Only the first 12 positions are included for the driver standings.

Previous race: 2013 Nationwide Children's Hospital 200	NASCAR Nationwide Series; 2013 season	Next race: 2013 Great Clips/Grit Chips 300
