= 2013 Zippo 200 at The Glen =

21st race of the 2013 NASCAR Nationwide Series

Race details
- Race 21 of 33 of the 2013 NASCAR Nationwide Series
- Date: August 10, 2013
- Official name: 19th Annual Zippo 200 at The Glen
- Location: Watkins Glen, New York, Watkins Glen International
- Course: Permanent racing facility
- Course length: 2.454 miles (3.949 km)
- Distance: 82 laps, 200.9 mi (323.317 km)
- Scheduled distance: 82 laps, 200.9 mi (323.317 km)
- Average speed: 92.368 miles per hour (148.652 km/h)

Pole position
Driver	Sam Hornish Jr.	Penske Racing
- Time: 1:11.538

Most laps led
Driver	Brad Keselowski	Penske Racing
- Laps: 46

Winner
No. 22	Brad Keselowski	Penske Racing

Television in the United States
- Network: ABC
- Announcers: Marty Reid, Dale Jarrett, Andy Petree

Radio in the United States
- Radio: Motor Racing Network

The 2013 Zippo 200 at The Glen was the 21st stock car race of the 2013 NASCAR Nationwide Series and the 19th iteration of the event. The race was held on Saturday, August 10, 2013, in Watkins Glen, New York at Watkins Glen International, a 2.45-mile (3.94 km) permanent road course. The race took the scheduled 82 laps to complete. At race's end, Brad Keselowski, driving for Penske Racing, would dominate the race to win his 24th career NASCAR Nationwide Series win and his fourth of the season. To fill out the podium, Sam Hornish Jr. of Penske Racing and Brian Vickers of Joe Gibbs Racing would finish second and third, respectively.

== Background ==
Watkins Glen International (nicknamed "The Glen") is an automobile race track located in Watkins Glen, New York at the southern tip of Seneca Lake. It was long known around the world as the home of the Formula One United States Grand Prix, which it hosted for twenty consecutive years (1961–1980), but the site has been home to road racing of nearly every class, including the World Sportscar Championship, Trans-Am, Can-Am, NASCAR Sprint Cup Series, the International Motor Sports Association and the IndyCar Series.

Initially, public roads in the village were used for the race course. In 1956 a permanent circuit for the race was built. In 1968 the race was extended to six hours, becoming the 6 Hours of Watkins Glen. The circuit's current layout has more or less been the same since 1971, although a chicane was installed at the uphill Esses in 1975 to slow cars through these corners, where there was a fatality during practice at the 1973 United States Grand Prix. The chicane was removed in 1985, but another chicane called the "Inner Loop" was installed in 1992 after J.D. McDuffie's fatal accident during the previous year's NASCAR Winston Cup event.

The circuit is known as the Mecca of North American road racing and is a very popular venue among fans and drivers. The facility is currently owned by International Speedway Corporation.

=== Entry list ===
#	Driver	Team	Make	Sponsor
00	Blake Koch	SR² Motorsports	Toyota	Compassion International
01	Mike Wallace	JD Motorsports	Chevrolet	JD Motorsports
2	Brian Scott	Richard Childress Racing	Chevrolet	Shore Lodge
3	Austin Dillon	Richard Childress Racing	Chevrolet	AdvoCare
4	Landon Cassill	JD Motorsports	Chevrolet	JD Motorsports
5	Kasey Kahne (i)	JR Motorsports	Chevrolet	Great Clips
6	Trevor Bayne	Roush Fenway Racing	Ford	Ford EcoBoost
7	Regan Smith	JR Motorsports	Chevrolet	TaxSlayer
10	Jeff Green	TriStar Motorsports	Toyota	TriStar Motorsports
11	Elliott Sadler	Joe Gibbs Racing	Toyota	OneMain Financial
12	Sam Hornish Jr.	Penske Racing	Ford	Penske Rental
14	Eric McClure	TriStar Motorsports	Toyota	Hefty, Reynolds Wrap
19	Mike Bliss	TriStar Motorsports	Toyota	TriStar Motorsports
20	Brian Vickers	Joe Gibbs Racing	Toyota	Dollar General
22	Brad Keselowski (i)	Penske Racing	Ford	Hertz
23	Anthony Gandon	Rick Ware Racing	Ford	Qolix
24	Derek White	SR² Motorsports	Toyota	VIP Poker
30	Nelson Piquet Jr. (R)	Turner Scott Motorsports	Chevrolet	Qualcomm
31	Justin Allgaier	Turner Scott Motorsports	Chevrolet	Brandt Professional Agriculture
32	Kyle Larson (R)	Turner Scott Motorsports	Chevrolet	McDonald's
33	Brendan Gaughan (i)	Richard Childress Racing	Chevrolet	South Point Hotel, Casino & Spa
40	Reed Sorenson	The Motorsports Group	Chevrolet	Swisher E-Cigarette
42	Josh Wise	The Motorsports Group	Chevrolet	The Motorsports Group
43	Michael Annett	Richard Petty Motorsports	Ford	Pilot Travel Center
44	Cole Whitt	TriStar Motorsports	Toyota	Gold Bond
46	T. J. Bell	The Motorsports Group	Chevrolet	The Motorsports Group
48	Joey Logano (i)	Penske Racing	Ford	Discount Tire
51	Jeremy Clements	Jeremy Clements Racing	Chevrolet	Jeremy Clements Racing
52	Joey Gase	Jimmy Means Racing	Toyota	Jimmy Means Racing
53	Andrew Ranger	NDS Motorsports	Dodge	Waste Management
54	Kyle Busch (i)	Joe Gibbs Racing	Toyota	Monster Energy
60	Travis Pastrana	Roush Fenway Racing	Ford	Roush Fenway Racing
70	Tony Raines	ML Motorsports	Toyota	ML Motorsports
74	Carl Long	Mike Harmon Racing	Chevrolet	Mike Harmon Racing
75	Kenny Habul	SunEnergy1 Racing	Toyota	SunEnergy1
77	Parker Kligerman	Kyle Busch Motorsports	Toyota	Bandit Chippers, Toyota
79	Bryan Silas (R) (i)	Go Green Racing	Ford	Bell Trucks America
87	Kyle Kelley	NEMCO Motorsports	Chevrolet	First Class Auto Body, Jamison Engineering
89	Morgan Shepherd	Shepherd Racing Ventures	Chevrolet	Racing with Jesus
92	Dexter Stacey*	KH Motorsports	Ford	Maddie's Place Rocks
99	Alex Bowman (R)	RAB Racing	Toyota	Nationwide Children's Hospital
Official entry list

== Practice ==
The only practice session was held on Friday, August 9, at 1:40 PM, and would last for two hours and 10 minutes. Sam Hornish Jr. of Penske Racing would set the fastest time in the session, with a lap of 1:12.009 and an average speed of 122.485 miles per hour (197.120 km/h).

Pos.	#	Driver	Team	Make	Time	Speed
2	12	Sam Hornish Jr.	Penske Racing	Ford	1:12.009	122.485
1	22	Brad Keselowski (i)	Penske Racing	Ford	1:12.123	122.291
3	7	Regan Smith	JR Motorsports	Chevrolet	1:12.378	121.860
Full practice results

== Qualifying ==
Qualifying was held on Saturday, August 10, at 9:35 AM EST. Each driver would have one lap to set a time.

Sam Hornish Jr. of Penske Racing would win the pole, setting a time of 1:11.538 and an average speed of 123.291 miles per hour (198.418 km/h).

No drivers would fail to qualify.

=== Full qualifying results ===
Pos.	#	Driver	Team	Make	Time	Speed
1	12	Sam Hornish Jr.	Penske Racing	Ford	1:11.538	123.291
2	54	Kyle Busch (i)	Joe Gibbs Racing	Toyota	1:11.837	122.778
3	48	Joey Logano (i)	Penske Racing	Ford	1:11.906	122.660
4	7	Regan Smith	JR Motorsports	Chevrolet	1:11.926	122.626
5	22	Brad Keselowski (i)	Penske Racing	Ford	1:11.956	122.575
6	31	Justin Allgaier	Turner Scott Motorsports	Chevrolet	1:11.977	122.539
7	30	Nelson Piquet Jr.	Turner Scott Motorsports	Chevrolet	1:12.047	122.420
8	20	Brian Vickers	Joe Gibbs Racing	Toyota	1:12.132	122.276
9	77	Parker Kligerman	Kyle Busch Motorsports	Toyota	1:12.185	122.186
10	2	Brian Scott	Richard Childress Racing	Chevrolet	1:12.200	122.161
11	11	Elliott Sadler	Joe Gibbs Racing	Toyota	1:12.268	122.046
12	6	Trevor Bayne	Roush Fenway Racing	Ford	1:12.455	121.731
13	5	Kasey Kahne (i)	JR Motorsports	Chevrolet	1:12.575	121.529
14	3	Austin Dillon	Richard Childress Racing	Chevrolet	1:12.903	120.983
15	32	Kyle Larson	Turner Scott Motorsports	Chevrolet	1:12.943	120.916
16	33	Brendan Gaughan (i)	Richard Childress Racing	Chevrolet	1:12.948	120.908
17	44	Cole Whitt	TriStar Motorsports	Toyota	1:13.014	120.799
18	43	Michael Annett	Richard Petty Motorsports	Ford	1:13.119	120.625
19	99	Alex Bowman	RAB Racing	Toyota	1:13.409	120.149
20	60	Travis Pastrana	Roush Fenway Racing	Ford	1:13.556	119.909
21	53	Andrew Ranger	NDS Motorsports	Dodge	1:13.910	119.334
22	87	Kyle Kelley	NEMCO Motorsports	Chevrolet	1:13.926	119.308
23	01	Mike Wallace	JD Motorsports	Chevrolet	1:14.053	119.104
24	4	Landon Cassill	JD Motorsports	Chevrolet	1:14.148	118.951
25	19	Mike Bliss	TriStar Motorsports	Toyota	1:14.187	118.889
26	51	Jeremy Clements	Jeremy Clements Racing	Chevrolet	1:14.367	118.601
27	40	Reed Sorenson	The Motorsports Group	Chevrolet	1:14.633	118.178
28	79	Bryan Silas (R) (i)	Go Green Racing	Ford	1:16.055	115.969
29	10	Jeff Green	TriStar Motorsports	Toyota	1:16.106	115.891
30	14	Eric McClure	TriStar Motorsports	Toyota	1:16.157	115.813
31	42	Josh Wise	The Motorsports Group	Chevrolet	1:16.875	114.732
32	75	Kenny Habul	SunEnergy1 Racing	Toyota	1:16.912	114.677
33	70	Tony Raines	ML Motorsports	Toyota	1:17.385	113.976
34	46	T. J. Bell	The Motorsports Group	Chevrolet	1:17.828	113.327
35	24	Derek White	SR² Motorsports	Toyota	1:17.966	113.126
36	00	Blake Koch	SR² Motorsports	Toyota	1:20.190	109.989
37	74	Carl Long	Mike Harmon Racing	Chevrolet	1:20.454	109.628
38	52	Joey Gase	Jimmy Means Racing	Chevrolet	1:23.073	106.172
39	23	Anthony Gandon	Rick Ware Racing	Ford	—	—
40	89	Morgan Shepherd	Shepherd Racing Ventures	Chevrolet	—	—
Withdrew
WD	92	Dexter Stacey	KH Motorsports	Ford	—	—
Official starting lineup

== Race results ==
Fin	St	#	Driver	Team	Make	Laps	Led	Status	Pts	Winnings
1	5	22	Brad Keselowski (i)	Penske Racing	Ford	82	46	running	0	$45,100
2	1	12	Sam Hornish Jr.	Penske Racing	Ford	82	15	running	43	$39,132
3	8	20	Brian Vickers	Joe Gibbs Racing	Toyota	82	1	running	42	$31,906
4	4	7	Regan Smith	JR Motorsports	Chevrolet	82	1	running	41	$27,631
5	11	11	Elliott Sadler	Joe Gibbs Racing	Toyota	82	0	running	39	$24,781
6	9	77	Parker Kligerman	Kyle Busch Motorsports	Toyota	82	7	running	39	$25,181
7	6	31	Justin Allgaier	Turner Scott Motorsports	Chevrolet	82	0	running	37	$19,706
8	17	44	Cole Whitt	TriStar Motorsports	Toyota	82	0	running	36	$19,336
9	7	30	Nelson Piquet Jr.	Turner Scott Motorsports	Chevrolet	82	0	running	35	$20,131
10	12	6	Trevor Bayne	Roush Fenway Racing	Ford	82	0	running	34	$20,131
11	10	2	Brian Scott	Richard Childress Racing	Chevrolet	82	0	running	33	$18,781
12	14	3	Austin Dillon	Richard Childress Racing	Chevrolet	82	0	running	32	$18,506
13	19	99	Alex Bowman	RAB Racing	Toyota	82	0	running	31	$18,406
14	16	33	Brendan Gaughan (i)	Richard Childress Racing	Chevrolet	82	0	running	0	$18,256
15	20	60	Travis Pastrana	Roush Fenway Racing	Ford	82	0	running	29	$19,356
16	27	40	Reed Sorenson	The Motorsports Group	Chevrolet	82	0	running	28	$18,131
17	24	4	Landon Cassill	JD Motorsports	Chevrolet	82	0	running	27	$18,081
18	13	5	Kasey Kahne (i)	JR Motorsports	Chevrolet	82	0	running	0	$11,800
19	22	87	Kyle Kelley	NEMCO Motorsports	Chevrolet	82	0	running	25	$17,931
20	26	51	Jeremy Clements	Jeremy Clements Racing	Chevrolet	82	0	running	24	$18,556
21	3	48	Joey Logano (i)	Penske Racing	Ford	81	12	running	0	$11,625
22	18	43	Michael Annett	Richard Petty Motorsports	Ford	81	0	running	22	$17,781
23	28	79	Bryan Silas (R) (i)	Go Green Racing	Ford	81	0	running	0	$17,706
24	2	54	Kyle Busch (i)	Joe Gibbs Racing	Toyota	77	0	running	0	$11,400
25	35	24	Derek White	SR² Motorsports	Toyota	75	0	radiator	19	$18,031
26	21	53	Andrew Ranger	NDS Motorsports	Dodge	71	0	rear gear	18	$11,300
27	25	19	Mike Bliss	TriStar Motorsports	Toyota	71	0	running	17	$17,456
28	30	14	Eric McClure	TriStar Motorsports	Toyota	67	0	suspension	16	$17,381
29	33	70	Tony Raines	ML Motorsports	Toyota	47	0	brakes	15	$17,331
30	15	32	Kyle Larson	Turner Scott Motorsports	Chevrolet	41	0	engine	14	$17,581
31	37	74	Carl Long	Mike Harmon Racing	Chevrolet	35	0	engine	13	$17,206
32	39	23	Anthony Gandon	Rick Ware Racing	Ford	27	0	running	12	$10,925
33	38	52	Joey Gase	Jimmy Means Racing	Chevrolet	20	0	electrical	11	$17,096
34	32	75	Kenny Habul	SunEnergy1 Racing	Toyota	15	0	engine	10	$17,036
35	40	89	Morgan Shepherd	Shepherd Racing Ventures	Chevrolet	12	0	brakes	0	$10,787
36	36	00	Blake Koch	SR² Motorsports	Toyota	7	0	overheating	8	$10,080
37	29	10	Jeff Green	TriStar Motorsports	Toyota	4	0	vibration	7	$10,045
38	34	46	T. J. Bell	The Motorsports Group	Chevrolet	2	0	electrical	6	$10,011
39	31	42	Josh Wise	The Motorsports Group	Chevrolet	1	0	brakes	5	$9,875
40	23	01	Mike Wallace	JD Motorsports	Chevrolet	0	0	crash	4	$15,941
Withdrew
WD		92	Dexter Stacey	KH Motorsports	Ford					
Official race results

== Standings after the race ==
Drivers' Championship standings

Pos	Driver	Points
1	Austin Dillon	730
2	Sam Hornish Jr.	727 (-3)
3	Regan Smith	725 (-5)
4	Elliott Sadler	718 (–12)
5	Brian Vickers	712 (–18)
6	Justin Allgaier	685 (–45)
7	Brian Scott	674 (–56)
8	Kyle Larson	665 (–65)
9	Trevor Bayne	661 (–69)
10	Parker Kligerman	656 (–74)
11	Alex Bowman	584 (–146)
12	Nelson Piquet Jr.	572 (–158)
Official driver's standings

- Note: Only the first 12 positions are included for the driver standings.

Previous race: 2013 U.S. Cellular 250	NASCAR Nationwide Series; 2013 season	Next race: 2013 Nationwide Children's Hospital 200
