= DRG Motorsports =

Former NASCAR team

- Owner: Scott DeWare
- Series: Nationwide Series
- Race drivers: Joe Nemechek; Jake Crum; Kevin Lepage
- Manufacturer: Chevrolet
- Opened: 2012
- Closed: 2014

Career
- Debut: 2012 F.W. Webb 200 (Loudon)
- Latest race: 2014 Virginia 529 College Savings 250 (Richmond)
- Races competed: 11
- Drivers' Championships: 0
- Race victories: 0
- Pole positions: 0

DRG Motorsports (formerly Deware Racing Group) was an American auto racing team, founded in 2012 by Scott DeWare. Based in North Carolina, it last fielded the No. 86 Chevrolet in the NASCAR Nationwide Series.

The team's driver was Kevin Lepage in 2012. In 2013, it competed in the Nationwide Series with drivers Lepage and Ricky Ehrgott. In 2014, the team returned to the Nationwide Series starting at Richmond International Raceway in April, with Joe Nemechek driving. In 2014 DRG also entered events with drivers Tim Cowen and Jake Crum.

In addition to competing under the No. 86, DRG also provided race preparation and track support for several other teams and drivers from 2012 to 2015. During this period DRG further competed in several ARCA events co/entering the events under the Fox/DRG Racing banner. DRG also has several NASCAR K&N Series starts and has provided driver testing and driver development services.

From 2016 to 2018, DRG was primarily involved with assisting teams with sponsorship and activation services and providing development consultation for new drivers.

On August 28, 2020, team owner Scott DeWare died at the age of 60.

== Car No. 86 results ==
Year	Driver	No.	Make	1	2	3	4	5	6	7	8	9	10	11	12	13	14	15	16	17	18	19	20	21	22	23	24	25	26	27	28	29	30	31	32	33	Owners	Pts
2012	Kevin Lepage	86	Ford	DAY	PHO	LVS	BRI	CAL	TEX	RCH	TAL	DAR	IOW	CLT	DOV	MCH	ROA	KEN	DAY	NHA; 33	CHI	IND; 40	IOW	GLN	CGV	BRI; 20	ATL	RCH; 33	CHI; Wth	KEN; 34	DOV; 34	CLT; 26	KAN	TEX; 40	PHO; 34	HOM	47th	103
2013	Kevin Lepage	86	Chevy	DAY	PHO	LVS	BRI; Wth	CAL	TEX	RCH	TAL	DAR	CLT	DOV	IOW	MCH	ROA	KEN	DAY	NHA	CHI	IND	IOW	GLN		BRI; DNQ	ATL										63rd	11
2013	Tim Cowen	86	Chevy																						MOH; DNQ												63rd	11
2013	Ricky Ehrgott	86	Chevy																									RCH; 33	CHI	KEN	DOV	KAN	CLT	TEX	PHO	HOM	63rd	11
2014	Joe Nemechek	86	Chevy	DAY	PHO	LVS	BRI	CAL	TEX	DAR	RCH; 23	TAL	IOW																								45th	100
2014	Kyle Fowler	86	Chevy											CLT; 32	DOV	MCH	ROA																				45th	100
2014	Jake Crum	86	Chevy															KEN; 27	DAY	NHA; 31	CHI	IND	IOW	GLN													45th	100
2014	Tim Cowen	86	Ford																						MOH; 18												45th	100
2014	Jake Crum	86	Ford																							BRI; 33	ATL	RCH	CHI	KEN	DOV	KAN	CLT	TEX	PHO		45th	100
2014	Jake Crum	26	Chevy																																	HOM; 24	45th	100
