= NASCAR Xfinity Series at Mid-Ohio Sports Car Course =

Annual stock car race in Ohio

B&L Transport 170

NASCAR Xfinity Series
- Venue: Mid-Ohio Sports Car Course
- Location: Lexington, Ohio, United States
- Corporate sponsor: B&L Transport
- First race: 2013
- Last race: 2021
- Distance: 169.35 miles (272.54 km)
- Laps: 75; All 3 stages: 25 each
- Previous names: Nationwide Children's Hospital 200 (2013–2015); Mid-Ohio Challenge (2016–2017); Rock N Roll Tequila 170 (2018)
- Most wins (driver): A. J. Allmendinger (2)
- Most wins (team): Team Penske (3)
- Most wins (manufacturer): Ford; Chevrolet (4)

Circuit information
- Surface: Asphalt
- Length: 2.258 mi (3.634 km)
- Turns: 13

The B&L Transport 170 was a NASCAR Xfinity Series race that was held at Mid-Ohio Sports Car Course in Lexington, Ohio, United States. The inaugural event took place on August 17, 2013, and was scheduled to be contested for 90 laps over a distance of 203.22 mi (327.05 km). However, the race was extended by four laps due to a green–white–checker finish. In 2015, the race was reduced to 75 laps 169.35 mi (272.54 km).

The 2016 race saw the fourth time the Xfinity Series used rain tires in a points event; the previous times were Road America in 2014 and Montreal in 2008 and 2009.

In 2022, Mid-Ohio was taken off the Xfinity series schedule, in exchange for Portland International Raceway. The track was then given a NASCAR Craftsman World Truck Series race.

== Race results ==
Year	Date	No.	Driver	Team	Manufacturer	Race Distance		Race Time	Average Speed (mph)	Report	Ref
Year	Date	No.	Driver	Team	Manufacturer	Laps	Miles (km)	Race Time	Average Speed (mph)	Report	Ref
2013	August 17	22	A. J. Allmendinger	Penske Racing	Ford	94*	212.252 (341.586)	2:43:51	77.724	Report	
2014	August 16	60	Chris Buescher	Roush Fenway Racing	Ford	90	203.22 (327.05)	2:38:23	76.985	Report	
2015	August 15	7	Regan Smith	JR Motorsports	Chevrolet	75	169.35 (272.542)	2:30:33	67.493	Report	
2016	August 13	42	Justin Marks	Chip Ganassi Racing	Chevrolet	75	169.35 (272.542)	3:10:09	53.437	Report	
2017	August 12	22	Sam Hornish Jr.	Team Penske	Ford	75	169.35 (272.542)	2:38:23	64.154	Report	
2018	August 11	7	Justin Allgaier	JR Motorsports	Chevrolet	75	169.35 (272.542)	2:18:36	73.312	Report	
2019	August 10	22	Austin Cindric	Team Penske	Ford	75	169.35 (272.542)	2:22:14	71.439	Report	
2020*	Not held										
2021	June 5	16	A. J. Allmendinger	Kaulig Racing	Chevrolet	78*	176.124 (283.443)	2:39:36	66.212	Report	

- 2013 & 2021: Races extended due to NASCAR overtime.
- 2020: Race cancelled and moved to Talladega due to the COVID-19 pandemic.

=== Multiple winners (drivers) ===
# Wins	Driver	Years Won
2	A. J. Allmendinger	2013, 2021

=== Multiple winners (teams) ===
# Wins	Make	Years Won
3	Team Penske	2013, 2017, 2019
2	JR Motorsports	2015, 2018

=== Manufacturer wins ===
# Wins	Make	Years Won
4	(United States) Ford	2013, 2014, 2017, 2019
4	(United States) Chevrolet	2015, 2016, 2018, 2021
