= 2017 Zippo 200 at The Glen =

20th race of the 2017 NASCAR Xfinity Series

Race details
- Race 20 of 33 in the 2017 NASCAR Xfinity Series
- Date: August 5, 2017
- Official name: 23rd Annual Zippo 200 at The Glen
- Location: Watkins Glen, New York, Watkins Glen International
- Course: Permanent racing facility
- Course length: 2.454 miles (3.949 km)
- Distance: 82 laps, 200.9 mi (323.317 km)
- Scheduled distance: 82 laps, 200.9 mi (323.317 km)
- Average speed: 92.569 miles per hour (148.975 km/h)

Pole position
Driver	Joey Logano	Team Penske
- Time: 1:11.023

Most laps led
Driver	Kyle Busch	Joe Gibbs Racing
- Laps: 43

Winner
No. 18	Kyle Busch	Joe Gibbs Racing

Television in the United States
- Network: NBCSN
- Announcers: Rick Allen, Jeff Burton, Steve Letarte

Radio in the United States
- Radio: Motor Racing Network

The 2017 Zippo 200 at The Glen was the 20th stock car race of the 2017 NASCAR Xfinity Series season and the 23rd iteration of the event. The race was held on Saturday, August 5, 2017, in Watkins Glen, New York at Watkins Glen International, a 2.45-mile (3.94 km) permanent road course. The race took the scheduled 82 laps to complete. At race's end, Kyle Busch, driving for Joe Gibbs Racing, would dominate the late stages of the race to win his 90th career NASCAR Xfinity Series win and his fourth win of the season. To fill out the podium, Joey Logano and Brad Keselowski, both driving for Team Penske, would finish second and third, respectively.

== Entry list ==
- (R) denotes rookie driver.
- (i) denotes driver who is ineligible for series driver points.

#	Driver	Team	Make
00	Cole Custer (R)	Stewart–Haas Racing	Ford
0	Garrett Smithley	JD Motorsports	Chevrolet
01	Harrison Rhodes	JD Motorsports	Chevrolet
1	Elliott Sadler	JR Motorsports	Chevrolet
2	Paul Menard (i)	Richard Childress Racing	Chevrolet
3	Ty Dillon (i)	Richard Childress Racing	Chevrolet
4	Ross Chastain	JD Motorsports	Chevrolet
5	Michael Annett	JR Motorsports	Chevrolet
7	Justin Allgaier	JR Motorsports	Chevrolet
07	Devin Jones	SS-Green Light Racing	Chevrolet
8	Josh Bilicki	B. J. McLeod Motorsports	Chevrolet
9	William Byron (R)	JR Motorsports	Chevrolet
11	Blake Koch	Kaulig Racing	Chevrolet
12	Joey Logano (i)	Team Penske	Ford
13	Timmy Hill	MBM Motorsports	Dodge
14	J. J. Yeley	TriStar Motorsports	Toyota
16	Ryan Reed	Roush Fenway Racing	Ford
18	Kyle Busch (i)	Joe Gibbs Racing	Toyota
19	Matt Tifft (R)	Joe Gibbs Racing	Toyota
20	Erik Jones (i)	Joe Gibbs Racing	Toyota
21	Daniel Hemric (R)	Richard Childress Racing	Chevrolet
22	Brad Keselowski (i)	Team Penske	Ford
23	Spencer Gallagher (R)	GMS Racing	Chevrolet
24	Dylan Lupton	JGL Racing	Toyota
25	P. J. Jones	Chris Cockrum Racing	Chevrolet
28	Dakoda Armstrong	JGL Racing	Toyota
33	Brandon Jones	Richard Childress Racing	Chevrolet
39	Ryan Sieg	RSS Racing	Chevrolet
40	Enrique Baca	MBM Motorsports	Toyota
41	Kevin Harvick (i)	Stewart–Haas Racing	Ford
42	Kyle Larson (i)	Chip Ganassi Racing	Chevrolet
48	Brennan Poole	Chip Ganassi Racing	Chevrolet
51	Jeremy Clements	Jeremy Clements Racing	Chevrolet
52	Joey Gase	Jimmy Means Racing	Chevrolet
62	Brendan Gaughan	Richard Childress Racing	Chevrolet
74	Cody Ware (i)	Mike Harmon Racing	Dodge
78	Stephen Young	B. J. McLeod Motorsports	Chevrolet
90	Brian Henderson	Brandonbilt Motorsports	Chevrolet
93	Jeff Green	RSS Racing	Chevrolet
98	Casey Mears	Biagi–DenBeste Racing	Ford
99	David Starr	B. J. McLeod Motorsports with SS-Green Light Racing	Chevrolet
Official entry list

== Practice ==
=== First practice ===
The first practice session was held on Friday, August 4, at 12:00 PM EST. The session would last for 55 minutes. Brad Keselowski of Team Penske would set the fastest time in the session, with a lap of 1:12:177 and an average speed of 122.200 miles per hour (196.662 km/h).

Pos	#	Driver	Team	Make	Time	Speed
1	22	Brad Keselowski (i)	Team Penske	Ford	1:12:177	122.200
2	18	Kyle Busch (i)	Joe Gibbs Racing	Toyota	1:12:541	121.586
3	12	Joey Logano (i)	Team Penske	Ford	1:12:592	121.501
Full first practice results

=== Final practice ===
The final practice session was held on Friday, August 4, at 2:30 PM EST. The session would last for 55 minutes. Joey Logano of Team Penske would set the fastest time in the session, with a lap of 1:12:326 and an average speed of 121.948 miles per hour (196.256 km/h).

Pos	#	Driver	Team	Make	Time	Speed
1	12	Joey Logano (i)	Team Penske	Ford	1:12:326	121.948
2	18	Kyle Busch (i)	Joe Gibbs Racing	Toyota	1:12:645	121.412
3	22	Brad Keselowski (i)	Team Penske	Ford	1:12:818	121.124
Full final practice results

== Qualifying ==
Qualifying was held on Saturday, August 5, at 11:05 AM EST. Since Watkins Glen International is a road course, the qualifying system was a multi-car system that included two rounds. The first round was 25 minutes, where every driver would be able to set a lap within the 25 minutes. Then, the second round would consist of the fastest 12 cars in Round 1, and drivers would have 10 minutes to set a lap. Whoever set the fastest time in Round 2 would win the pole.

Joey Logano of Team Penske would win the pole, with a lap of 1:11.023 and an average speed of 124.185 miles per hour (199.856 km/h) in the second round.

=== Full qualifying results ===
Pos	#	Driver	Team	Make	Time (R1)	Speed (R1)	Time (R2)	Speed (R2)
1	12	Joey Logano (i)	Team Penske	Ford	1:11:720	122.978	1:11.023	124.185
2	18	Kyle Busch (i)	Joe Gibbs Racing	Toyota	1:11:625	123.141	1:11.118	124.019
3	42	Kyle Larson (i)	Chip Ganassi Racing	Chevrolet	1:11:685	123.038	1:11.141	123.979
4	2	Paul Menard (i)	Richard Childress Racing	Chevrolet	1:11:947	122.590	1:11.517	123.327
5	22	Brad Keselowski (i)	Team Penske	Ford	1:11:972	122.548	1:11.723	122.973
6	20	Erik Jones (i)	Joe Gibbs Racing	Toyota	1:12:094	122.340	1:11.956	122.575
7	7	Justin Allgaier	JR Motorsports	Chevrolet	1:11:984	122.527	1:12.012	122.480
8	21	Daniel Hemric (R)	Richard Childress Racing	Chevrolet	1:12:028	122.452	1:12.024	122.459
9	00	Cole Custer (R)	Stewart–Haas Racing	Ford	1:12:237	122.098	1:12.053	122.410
10	41	Kevin Harvick (i)	Stewart–Haas Racing	Ford	1:12:136	122.269	1:12.102	122.327
11	3	Ty Dillon (i)	Richard Childress Racing	Chevrolet	1:12:420	121.790	1:12.466	121.712
12	16	Ryan Reed	Roush Fenway Racing	Ford	1:12:460	121.722	1:12.589	121.506
Eliminated in Round 1
13	48	Brennan Poole	Chip Ganassi Racing	Chevrolet	1:12.630	121.437	-	-
14	11	Blake Koch	Kaulig Racing	Chevrolet	1:12.660	121.387	-	-
15	9	William Byron (R)	JR Motorsports	Chevrolet	1:12.663	121.382	-	-
16	62	Brendan Gaughan	Richard Childress Racing	Chevrolet	1:12.712	121.300	-	-
17	98	Casey Mears	Biagi–DenBeste Racing	Ford	1:12.753	121.232	-	-
18	33	Brandon Jones	Richard Childress Racing	Chevrolet	1:12.754	121.230	-	-
19	19	Matt Tifft (R)	Joe Gibbs Racing	Toyota	1:12.819	121.122	-	-
20	1	Elliott Sadler	JR Motorsports	Chevrolet	1:12.911	120.969	-	-
21	51	Jeremy Clements	Jeremy Clements Racing	Chevrolet	1:13.093	120.668	-	-
22	23	Spencer Gallagher (R)	GMS Racing	Chevrolet	1:13.142	120.587	-	-
23	24	Dylan Lupton	JGL Racing	Toyota	1:13.247	120.414	-	-
24	39	Ryan Sieg	RSS Racing	Chevrolet	1:13.310	120.311	-	-
25	14	J. J. Yeley	TriStar Motorsports	Toyota	1:13.823	119.475	-	-
26	28	Dakoda Armstrong	JGL Racing	Toyota	1:13.842	119.444	-	-
27	5	Michael Annett	JR Motorsports	Chevrolet	1:14.121	118.995	-	-
28	8	Josh Bilicki	B. J. McLeod Motorsports	Chevrolet	1:14.275	118.748	-	-
29	4	Ross Chastain	JD Motorsports	Chevrolet	1:14.334	118.654	-	-
30	13	Timmy Hill	MBM Motorsports	Dodge	1:14.538	118.329	-	-
31	93	Jeff Green	RSS Racing	Chevrolet	1:14.665	118.128	-	-
32	74	Cody Ware (i)	Mike Harmon Racing	Dodge	1:14.791	117.929	-	-
33	0	Garrett Smithley	JD Motorsports	Chevrolet	1:14.835	117.859	-	-
Qualified by owner's points
34	90	Brian Henderson	Brandonbilt Motorsports	Chevrolet	1:15.195	117.295	-	-
35	40	Enrique Baca	MBM Motorsports	Toyota	1:15.244	117.219	-	-
36	01	Harrison Rhodes	JD Motorsports	Chevrolet	1:15.342	117.066	-	-
37	99	David Starr	BJMM with SS-Green Light Racing	Chevrolet	1:15.648	116.593	-	-
38	07	Devin Jones	SS-Green Light Racing	Chevrolet	1:15.769	116.406	-	-
39	78	Stephen Young	B. J. McLeod Motorsports	Chevrolet	1:16.279	115.628	-	-
40	52	Joey Gase	Jimmy Means Racing	Chevrolet	1:17.540	113.748	-	-
Failed to qualify
41	25	P. J. Jones	Chris Cockrum Racing	Chevrolet	1:15.428	116.933	-	-
Official qualifying results
Official starting lineup

== Race results ==
Stage 1 Laps: 20

Pos	#	Driver	Team	Make	Pts
1	22	Brad Keselowski (i)	Team Penske	Ford	0
2	12	Joey Logano (i)	Team Penske	Ford	0
3	18	Kyle Busch (i)	Joe Gibbs Racing	Toyota	0
4	20	Erik Jones (i)	Joe Gibbs Racing	Toyota	0
5	7	Justin Allgaier	JR Motorsports	Chevrolet	6
6	21	Daniel Hemric (R)	Richard Childress Racing	Chevrolet	5
7	00	Cole Custer (R)	Stewart–Haas Racing	Ford	4
8	48	Brennan Poole	Chip Ganassi Racing	Chevrolet	3
9	62	Brendan Gaughan	Richard Childress Racing	Chevrolet	2
10	11	Blake Koch	Kaulig Racing	Chevrolet	1

Stage 2 Laps: 20

Pos	#	Driver	Team	Make	Pts
1	2	Paul Menard (i)	Richard Childress Racing	Chevrolet	0
2	12	Joey Logano (i)	Team Penske	Ford	0
3	22	Brad Keselowski (i)	Team Penske	Ford	0
4	18	Kyle Busch (i)	Joe Gibbs Racing	Toyota	0
5	1	Elliott Sadler	JR Motorsports	Chevrolet	6
6	7	Justin Allgaier	JR Motorsports	Chevrolet	5
7	11	Blake Koch	Kaulig Racing	Chevrolet	4
8	33	Brandon Jones	Richard Childress Racing	Chevrolet	3
9	20	Erik Jones (i)	Joe Gibbs Racing	Toyota	0
10	21	Daniel Hemric (R)	Richard Childress Racing	Chevrolet	1

Stage 3 Laps: 42

Pos	#	Driver	Team	Make	Laps	Led	Status	Pts
1	18	Kyle Busch (i)	Joe Gibbs Racing	Toyota	82	43	running	0
2	12	Joey Logano (i)	Team Penske	Ford	82	0	running	0
3	22	Brad Keselowski (i)	Team Penske	Ford	82	6	running	0
4	7	Justin Allgaier	JR Motorsports	Chevrolet	82	0	running	44
5	2	Paul Menard (i)	Richard Childress Racing	Chevrolet	82	22	running	0
6	41	Kevin Harvick (i)	Stewart–Haas Racing	Ford	82	0	running	0
7	3	Ty Dillon (i)	Richard Childress Racing	Chevrolet	82	0	running	0
8	20	Erik Jones (i)	Joe Gibbs Racing	Toyota	82	0	running	0
9	62	Brendan Gaughan	Richard Childress Racing	Chevrolet	82	7	running	30
10	9	William Byron (R)	JR Motorsports	Chevrolet	82	0	running	27
11	21	Daniel Hemric (R)	Richard Childress Racing	Chevrolet	82	4	running	32
12	00	Cole Custer (R)	Stewart–Haas Racing	Ford	82	0	running	29
13	19	Matt Tifft (R)	Joe Gibbs Racing	Toyota	82	0	running	24
14	33	Brandon Jones	Richard Childress Racing	Chevrolet	82	0	running	26
15	16	Ryan Reed	Roush Fenway Racing	Ford	82	0	running	22
16	5	Michael Annett	JR Motorsports	Chevrolet	82	0	running	21
17	48	Brennan Poole	Chip Ganassi Racing	Chevrolet	82	0	running	23
18	1	Elliott Sadler	JR Motorsports	Chevrolet	81	0	running	25
19	4	Ross Chastain	JD Motorsports	Chevrolet	81	0	running	18
20	24	Dylan Lupton	JGL Racing	Toyota	81	0	running	17
21	28	Dakoda Armstrong	JGL Racing	Toyota	81	0	running	16
22	11	Blake Koch	Kaulig Racing	Chevrolet	81	0	running	20
23	01	Harrison Rhodes	JD Motorsports	Chevrolet	81	0	running	14
24	0	Garrett Smithley	JD Motorsports	Chevrolet	81	0	running	13
25	98	Casey Mears	Biagi–DenBeste Racing	Ford	80	0	running	12
26	07	Devin Jones	SS-Green Light Racing	Chevrolet	80	0	running	11
27	39	Ryan Sieg	RSS Racing	Chevrolet	80	0	running	10
28	8	Josh Bilicki	B. J. McLeod Motorsports	Chevrolet	79	0	running	9
29	52	Joey Gase	Jimmy Means Racing	Chevrolet	79	0	running	8
30	99	David Starr	B. J. McLeod Motorsports with SS-Green Light Racing	Chevrolet	79	0	running	7
31	40	Enrique Baca	MBM Motorsports	Toyota	78	0	running	6
32	23	Spencer Gallagher (R)	GMS Racing	Chevrolet	67	0	running	5
33	90	Brian Henderson	Brandonbilt Motorsports	Chevrolet	59	0	ignition	4
34	74	Cody Ware (i)	Mike Harmon Racing	Dodge	52	0	clutch	0
35	51	Jeremy Clements	Jeremy Clements Racing	Chevrolet	36	0	axle	2
36	78	Stephen Young	B. J. McLeod Motorsports	Chevrolet	33	0	transmission	1
37	13	Timmy Hill	MBM Motorsports	Dodge	27	0	overheating	1
38	93	Jeff Green	RSS Racing	Chevrolet	26	0	vibration	1
39	14	J. J. Yeley	TriStar Motorsports	Toyota	16	0	engine	1
40	42	Kyle Larson (i)	Chip Ganassi Racing	Chevrolet	12	0	engine	0
Official race results

== Standings after the race ==
Drivers' Championship standings

Pos	Driver	Points
1	Elliott Sadler	732
2	William Byron	680 (–52)
3	Justin Allgaier	608 (–124)
4	Brennan Poole	541 (–191)
5	Daniel Hemric	520 (–212)
6	Cole Custer	503 (–229)
7	Matt Tifft	460 (–272)
8	Ryan Reed	446 (–286)
9	Dakoda Armstrong	404 (–328)
10	Blake Koch	394 (–338)
11	Michael Annett	392 (–340)
12	Brendan Gaughan	383 (–349)
Official driver's standings

- Note: Only the first 12 positions are included for the driver standings.

Previous race: 2017 U.S. Cellular 250	NASCAR Xfinity Series; 2017 season	Next race: 2017 Mid-Ohio Challenge
