= 2017 Mid-Ohio Challenge =

21st race of the 2017 NASCAR Xfinity Series

Race details
- Race 21 of 33 in the 2017 NASCAR Xfinity Series
- Date: August 12, 2017
- Official name: 5th Annual Mid-Ohio Challenge
- Location: Lexington, Ohio, Mid-Ohio Sports Car Course
- Course: Permanent racing facility
- Course length: 2.258 miles (3.634 km)
- Distance: 75 laps, 169.35 mi (272.542 km)
- Scheduled distance: 75 laps, 169.35 mi (272.542 km)
- Average speed: 64.154 miles per hour (103.246 km/h)

Pole position
Driver	Sam Hornish Jr.	Team Penske
- Time: 1:23.921

Most laps led
Driver	Sam Hornish Jr.	Team Penske
- Laps: 61

Winner
No. 22	Sam Hornish Jr.	Team Penske

Television in the United States
- Network: NBCSN
- Announcers: Dave Burns, Dale Jarrett

Radio in the United States
- Radio: Motor Racing Network

The 2017 Mid-Ohio Challenge was the 21st stock car race of the 2017 NASCAR Xfinity Series season and the fifth iteration of the event. The race was held on Saturday, August 12, 2017, in Lexington, Ohio at the Mid-Ohio Sports Car Course, a 2.258 miles (3.634 km) permanent road course. The race took the scheduled 75 laps to complete. At race's end, Sam Hornish Jr., driving for Team Penske, would hold off the field on the final restart with five to go to complete a dominant performance. The win was Hornish's sixth and to date, final career win in the NASCAR Xfinity Series and his only win of the season. To fill out the podium, Daniel Hemric, driving for Richard Childress Racing, and Matt Tifft, driving for Joe Gibbs Racing, would finish second and third, respectively.

== Entry list ==
- (R) denotes rookie driver.
- (i) denotes driver who is ineligible for series driver points.

#	Driver	Team	Make
00	Cole Custer (R)	Stewart–Haas Racing	Ford
0	Garrett Smithley	JD Motorsports	Chevrolet
1	Elliott Sadler	JR Motorsports	Chevrolet
01	Sheldon Creed	JD Motorsports	Chevrolet
2	Ben Kennedy (R)	Richard Childress Racing	Chevrolet
3	Scott Lagasse Jr.	Richard Childress Racing	Chevrolet
4	Ross Chastain	JD Motorsports	Chevrolet
5	Michael Annett	JR Motorsports	Chevrolet
7	Justin Allgaier	JR Motorsports	Chevrolet
07	Andy Lally	SS-Green Light Racing	Chevrolet
8	Josh Bilicki	B. J. McLeod Motorsports	Chevrolet
9	William Byron (R)	JR Motorsports	Chevrolet
11	Blake Koch	Kaulig Racing	Chevrolet
13	Enrique Baca	MBM Motorsports	Dodge
14	J. J. Yeley	TriStar Motorsports	Toyota
16	Ryan Reed	Roush Fenway Racing	Ford
18	Regan Smith (i)	Joe Gibbs Racing	Toyota
19	Matt Tifft (R)	Joe Gibbs Racing	Toyota
20	James Davison	Joe Gibbs Racing	Toyota
21	Daniel Hemric (R)	Richard Childress Racing	Chevrolet
22	Sam Hornish Jr.	Team Penske	Ford
23	Spencer Gallagher (R)	GMS Racing	Chevrolet
24	Dylan Lupton	JGL Racing	Toyota
28	Dakoda Armstrong	JGL Racing	Toyota
33	Brandon Jones	Richard Childress Racing	Chevrolet
39	Ryan Sieg	RSS Racing	Chevrolet
40	Tim Cowen	MBM Motorsports	Ford
42	Justin Marks	Chip Ganassi Racing	Chevrolet
46	Anthony Kumpen	Precision Performance Motorsports	Chevrolet
48	Brennan Poole	Chip Ganassi Racing	Chevrolet
51	Jeremy Clements	Jeremy Clements Racing	Chevrolet
52	Joey Gase	Jimmy Means Racing	Chevrolet
62	Brendan Gaughan	Richard Childress Racing	Chevrolet
74	Cody Ware (i)	Mike Harmon Racing	Dodge
78	Stephen Young	B. J. McLeod Motorsports	Chevrolet
89	Morgan Shepherd	Shepherd Racing Ventures	Chevrolet
90	Matt Bell	King Autosport	Chevrolet
93	Jeff Green	RSS Racing	Chevrolet
98	Casey Mears	Biagi–DenBeste Racing	Ford
99	David Starr	B. J. McLeod Motorsports with SS-Green Light Racing	Chevrolet
Official entry list

== Practice ==
Originally, two practices were scheduled to be held on Friday, August 11. However, rain would force the cancellation of both sessions. Instead, a lone practice session was run the following day.

The only 45-minute practice session was held on Saturday, August 12, at 8:00 AM EST. Sam Hornish Jr., driving for Team Penske would set the fastest time in the session, with a lap of 1:25.695 and an average speed of 94.857 miles per hour (152.658 km/h).

Pos	#	Driver	Team	Make	Time	Speed
1	22	Sam Hornish Jr.	Team Penske	Ford	1:25.695	94.857
2	20	James Davison	Joe Gibbs Racing	Toyota	1:25.705	94.846
3	19	Matt Tifft (R)	Joe Gibbs Racing	Toyota	1:25.981	94.542
Full practice results

== Qualifying ==
Qualifying was held on Saturday, August 12, at 12:00 PM EST. Since the Mid-Ohio Sports Car Course is a road course, the qualifying system was a multi-car system that included two rounds. The first round was 25 minutes, where every driver would be able to set a lap within the 25 minutes. Then, the second round would consist of the fastest 12 cars in Round 1, and drivers would have 10 minutes to set a lap. Whoever set the fastest time in Round 2 would win the pole.

Sam Hornish Jr., driving for Team Penske would win the pole, with a lap of 1:23.921 and an average speed of 96.863 miles per hour (155.886 km/h) in the second round.

No drivers would fail to qualify.

=== Full qualifying results ===
Pos	#	Driver	Team	Make	Time (R1)	Speed (R1)	Time (R2)	Speed (R2)
1	22	Sam Hornish Jr.	Team Penske	Ford	1:24.357	96.362	1:23.921	96.863
2	1	Elliott Sadler	JR Motorsports	Chevrolet	1:24.608	96.076	1:24.870	95.779
3	11	Blake Koch	Kaulig Racing	Chevrolet	1:24.932	95.710	1:25.052	95.574
4	16	Ryan Reed	Roush Fenway Racing	Ford	1:24.811	95.846	1:25.173	95.439
5	19	Matt Tifft (R)	Joe Gibbs Racing	Toyota	1:25.059	95.567	1:25.358	95.232
6	21	Daniel Hemric (R)	Richard Childress Racing	Chevrolet	1:25.008	95.624	1:25.397	95.188
7	2	Ben Kennedy (R)	Richard Childress Racing	Chevrolet	1:24.946	95.694	1:25.533	95.037
8	7	Justin Allgaier	JR Motorsports	Chevrolet	1:24.988	95.646	1:25.569	94.997
9	00	Cole Custer (R)	Stewart–Haas Racing	Ford	1:24.608	96.076	1:25.783	94.760
10	48	Brennan Poole	Chip Ganassi Racing	Chevrolet	1:24.979	95.657	1:27.846	92.535
11	20	James Davison	Joe Gibbs Racing	Toyota	1:25.133	95.484	1:33.791	86.669
12	18	Regan Smith (i)	Joe Gibbs Racing	Toyota	1:25.215	95.392	-	-
Eliminated in Round 1
13	07	Andy Lally	SS-Green Light Racing	Chevrolet	1:25.353	95.237	-	-
14	4	Ross Chastain	JD Motorsports	Chevrolet	1:25.440	95.140	-	-
15	24	Dylan Lupton	JGL Racing	Toyota	1:25.545	95.024	-	-
16	39	Ryan Sieg	RSS Racing	Chevrolet	1:25.553	95.015	-	-
17	62	Brendan Gaughan	Richard Childress Racing	Chevrolet	1:25.640	94.918	-	-
18	14	J. J. Yeley	TriStar Motorsports	Toyota	1:25.782	94.761	-	-
19	98	Casey Mears	Biagi–DenBeste Racing	Ford	1:25.853	94.683	-	-
20	51	Jeremy Clements	Jeremy Clements Racing	Chevrolet	1:25.976	94.547	-	-
21	42	Justin Marks	Chip Ganassi Racing	Chevrolet	1:25.989	94.533	-	-
22	8	Josh Bilicki	B. J. McLeod Motorsports	Chevrolet	1:26.308	94.184	-	-
23	9	William Byron (R)	JR Motorsports	Chevrolet	1:26.332	94.157	-	-
24	23	Spencer Gallagher (R)	GMS Racing	Chevrolet	1:26.369	94.117	-	-
25	33	Brandon Jones	Richard Childress Racing	Chevrolet	1:26.376	94.109	-	-
26	3	Scott Lagasse Jr.	Richard Childress Racing	Chevrolet	1:26.644	93.818	-	-
27	90	Matt Bell	King Autosport	Chevrolet	1:26.808	93.641	-	-
28	28	Dakoda Armstrong	JGL Racing	Toyota	1:26.889	93.554	-	-
29	13	Enrique Baca	MBM Motorsports	Dodge	1:26.898	93.544	-	-
30	5	Michael Annett	JR Motorsports	Chevrolet	1:26.911	93.530	-	-
31	93	Jeff Green	RSS Racing	Chevrolet	1:27.138	93.287	-	-
32	01	Sheldon Creed	JD Motorsports	Chevrolet	1:27.207	93.213	-	-
33	0	Garrett Smithley	JD Motorsports	Chevrolet	1:27.250	93.167	-	-
Qualified by owner's points
34	46	Anthony Kumpen	Precision Performance Motorsports	Chevrolet	1:28.009	92.363	-	-
35	99	David Starr	BJMM with SS-Green Light Racing	Chevrolet	1:28.479	91.873	-	-
36	40	Tim Cowen	MBM Motorsports	Ford	1:28.482	91.870	-	-
37	78	Stephen Young	B. J. McLeod Motorsports	Chevrolet	1:30.587	89.735	-	-
38	89	Morgan Shepherd	Shepherd Racing Ventures	Chevrolet	1:34.973	85.591	-	-
39	52	Joey Gase	Jimmy Means Racing	Chevrolet	-	-	-	-
40	74	Cody Ware (i)	Mike Harmon Racing	Dodge	-	-	-	-
Official qualifying results
Official starting lineup

== Race results ==
Stage 1 Laps: 20

Pos	#	Driver	Team	Make	Pts
1	11	Blake Koch	Kaulig Racing	Chevrolet	10
2	48	Brennan Poole	Chip Ganassi Racing	Chevrolet	9
3	62	Brendan Gaughan	Richard Childress Racing	Chevrolet	8
4	16	Ryan Reed	Roush Fenway Racing	Ford	7
5	4	Ross Chastain	JD Motorsports	Chevrolet	6
6	51	Jeremy Clements	Jeremy Clements Racing	Chevrolet	5
7	39	Ryan Sieg	RSS Racing	Chevrolet	4
8	21	Daniel Hemric (R)	Richard Childress Racing	Chevrolet	3
9	22	Sam Hornish Jr.	Team Penske	Ford	2
10	8	Josh Bilicki	B. J. McLeod Motorsports	Chevrolet	1

Stage 2 Laps: 20

Pos	#	Driver	Team	Make	Pts
1	22	Sam Hornish Jr.	Team Penske	Ford	10
2	21	Daniel Hemric (R)	Richard Childress Racing	Chevrolet	9
3	20	James Davison	Joe Gibbs Racing	Toyota	8
4	7	Justin Allgaier	JR Motorsports	Chevrolet	7
5	07	Andy Lally	SS-Green Light Racing	Chevrolet	6
6	42	Justin Marks	Chip Ganassi Racing	Chevrolet	5
7	18	Regan Smith (i)	Joe Gibbs Racing	Toyota	0
8	2	Ben Kennedy (R)	Richard Childress Racing	Chevrolet	3
9	48	Brennan Poole	Chip Ganassi Racing	Chevrolet	2
10	11	Blake Koch	Kaulig Racing	Chevrolet	1

Stage 3 Laps: 35

Pos	#	Driver	Team	Make	Laps	Led	Status	Pts
1	22	Sam Hornish Jr.	Team Penske	Ford	75	61	running	52
2	21	Daniel Hemric (R)	Richard Childress Racing	Chevrolet	75	8	running	47
3	19	Matt Tifft (R)	Joe Gibbs Racing	Toyota	75	0	running	34
4	20	James Davison	Joe Gibbs Racing	Toyota	75	0	running	41
5	07	Andy Lally	SS-Green Light Racing	Chevrolet	75	0	running	38
6	1	Elliott Sadler	JR Motorsports	Chevrolet	75	1	running	31
7	62	Brendan Gaughan	Richard Childress Racing	Chevrolet	75	0	running	38
8	48	Brennan Poole	Chip Ganassi Racing	Chevrolet	75	0	running	40
9	42	Justin Marks	Chip Ganassi Racing	Chevrolet	75	0	running	33
10	28	Dakoda Armstrong	JGL Racing	Toyota	75	0	running	27
11	11	Blake Koch	Kaulig Racing	Chevrolet	75	3	running	37
12	39	Ryan Sieg	RSS Racing	Chevrolet	75	0	running	29
13	14	J. J. Yeley	TriStar Motorsports	Toyota	75	0	running	24
14	33	Brandon Jones	Richard Childress Racing	Chevrolet	75	0	running	23
15	4	Ross Chastain	JD Motorsports	Chevrolet	75	0	running	28
16	46	Anthony Kumpen	Precision Performance Motorsports	Chevrolet	75	0	running	21
17	99	David Starr	BJMM with SS-Green Light Racing	Chevrolet	75	0	running	20
18	13	Enrique Baca	MBM Motorsports	Dodge	75	0	running	19
19	5	Michael Annett	JR Motorsports	Chevrolet	75	0	running	18
20	40	Tim Cowen	MBM Motorsports	Ford	75	0	running	17
21	52	Joey Gase	Jimmy Means Racing	Chevrolet	75	0	running	16
22	3	Scott Lagasse Jr.	Richard Childress Racing	Chevrolet	75	0	running	15
23	74	Cody Ware (i)	Mike Harmon Racing	Dodge	75	0	running	0
24	78	Stephen Young	B. J. McLeod Motorsports	Chevrolet	75	0	running	13
25	9	William Byron (R)	JR Motorsports	Chevrolet	67	0	crash	12
26	2	Ben Kennedy (R)	Richard Childress Racing	Chevrolet	67	0	crash	14
27	24	Dylan Lupton	JGL Racing	Toyota	67	0	crash	10
28	18	Regan Smith (i)	Joe Gibbs Racing	Toyota	67	0	crash	0
29	8	Josh Bilicki	B. J. McLeod Motorsports	Chevrolet	67	0	crash	9
30	0	Garrett Smithley	JD Motorsports	Chevrolet	67	0	crash	7
31	7	Justin Allgaier	JR Motorsports	Chevrolet	67	0	crash	13
32	98	Casey Mears	Biagi–DenBeste Racing	Ford	64	0	engine	5
33	16	Ryan Reed	Roush Fenway Racing	Ford	57	2	crash	11
34	01	Sheldon Creed	JD Motorsports	Chevrolet	56	0	running	3
35	00	Cole Custer (R)	Stewart–Haas Racing	Ford	54	0	running	2
36	23	Spencer Gallagher (R)	GMS Racing	Chevrolet	51	0	crash	1
37	51	Jeremy Clements	Jeremy Clements Racing	Chevrolet	51	0	crash	6
38	90	Matt Bell	King Autosport	Chevrolet	15	0	crash	1
39	93	Jeff Green	RSS Racing	Chevrolet	9	0	transmission	1
40	89	Morgan Shepherd	Shepherd Racing Ventures	Chevrolet	5	0	handling	1
Official race results

== Standings after the race ==
Drivers' Championship standings

Pos	Driver	Points
1	Elliott Sadler	763
2	William Byron	682 (-81)
3	Justin Allgaier	621 (–142)
4	Brennan Poole	581 (–182)
5	Daniel Hemric	567 (–196)
6	Cole Custer	505 (-258)
7	Matt Tifft	494 (-269)
8	Ryan Reed	457 (-306)
9	Dakoda Armstrong	431 (-332)
10	Blake Koch	431 (-332)
11	Brendan Gaughan	421 (-342)
12	Michael Annett	410 (-353)
Official driver's standings

- Note: Only the first 12 positions are included for the driver standings.

Previous race: 2017 Zippo 200 at The Glen	NASCAR Xfinity Series; 2017 season	Next race: 2017 Food City 300
