= 2017 U.S. Cellular 250 =

19th race of the 2017 NASCAR Xfinity Series

Race details
- Race 19 of 33 in the 2017 NASCAR Xfinity Series
- Date: July 29, 2017
- Official name: Ninth Annual U.S. Cellular 250
- Location: Newton, Iowa, Iowa Speedway
- Course: Permanent racing facility
- Course length: 0.875 miles (1.408 km)
- Distance: 254 laps, 222.25 mi (357.676 km)
- Scheduled distance: 250 laps, 218.75 mi (352.044 km)
- Average speed: 96.900 miles per hour (155.945 km/h)

Pole position
Driver	Ryan Preece	Joe Gibbs Racing
- Time: 24.072

Most laps led
Driver	Ryan Preece	Joe Gibbs Racing
- Laps: 141

Winner
No. 20	Ryan Preece	Joe Gibbs Racing

Television in the United States
- Network: NBC
- Announcers: Dave Burns, Kyle Petty

Radio in the United States
- Radio: Motor Racing Network

The 2017 U.S. Cellular 250 was the 19th stock car race of the 2017 NASCAR Xfinity Series season and the ninth iteration of the event. The race was held on Saturday, July 29, 2017, in Newton, Iowa, at Iowa Speedway, a 0.875 miles (1.408 km) permanent D-shaped low-banked racetrack. The race was extended from 150 laps to 154 laps, due to a NASCAR overtime finish. Ryan Preece, driving for Joe Gibbs Racing, held off Kyle Benjamin in a close finish for his first career NASCAR Xfinity Series win. Preece would beat Benjamin by 0.054 of a second. To fill out the podium, Brian Scott of Richard Childress Racing would finish third, respectively.

== Entry list ==
- (R) denotes rookie driver.
- (i) denotes driver who is ineligible for series driver points.

#	Driver	Team	Make
00	Cole Custer (R)	Stewart–Haas Racing	Ford
0	Garrett Smithley	JD Motorsports	Chevrolet
01	Harrison Rhodes	JD Motorsports	Chevrolet
1	Elliott Sadler	JR Motorsports	Chevrolet
2	Ben Kennedy (R)	Richard Childress Racing	Chevrolet
3	Brian Scott	Richard Childress Racing	Chevrolet
4	Ross Chastain	JD Motorsports	Chevrolet
5	Michael Annett	JR Motorsports	Chevrolet
07	Ray Black Jr.	SS-Green Light Racing	Chevrolet
7	Justin Allgaier	JR Motorsports	Chevrolet
8	B. J. McLeod	B. J. McLeod Motorsports	Chevrolet
9	William Byron (R)	JR Motorsports	Chevrolet
11	Blake Koch	Kaulig Racing	Chevrolet
13	Bobby Dale Earnhardt	MBM Motorsports	Chevrolet
14	J. J. Yeley	TriStar Motorsports	Toyota
15	Reed Sorenson (i)	JD Motorsports	Chevrolet
16	Ryan Reed	Roush Fenway Racing	Ford
18	Kyle Benjamin	Joe Gibbs Racing	Toyota
19	Matt Tifft (R)	Joe Gibbs Racing	Toyota
20	Ryan Preece	Joe Gibbs Racing	Toyota
21	Daniel Hemric (R)	Richard Childress Racing	Chevrolet
22	Sam Hornish Jr.	Team Penske	Ford
23	Spencer Gallagher (R)	GMS Racing	Chevrolet
24	Dylan Lupton	JGL Racing	Toyota
28	Dakoda Armstrong	JGL Racing	Toyota
33	Brandon Jones	Richard Childress Racing	Chevrolet
39	Ryan Sieg	RSS Racing	Chevrolet
40	Stan Mullis	MBM Motorsports	Chevrolet
42	Tyler Reddick	Chip Ganassi Racing	Chevrolet
48	Brennan Poole	Chip Ganassi Racing	Chevrolet
51	Jeremy Clements	Jeremy Clements Racing	Chevrolet
52	Joey Gase	Jimmy Means Racing	Chevrolet
60	Ty Majeski	Roush Fenway Racing	Ford
62	Brendan Gaughan	Richard Childress Racing	Chevrolet
74	Mike Harmon	Mike Harmon Racing	Dodge
78	Tommy Joe Martins	B. J. McLeod Motorsports	Chevrolet
89	Morgan Shepherd	Shepherd Racing Ventures	Chevrolet
90	Brandon Brown	Brandonbilt Motorsports	Chevrolet
93	Jeff Green	RSS Racing	Chevrolet
96	Brett Moffitt (i)	GMS Racing	Chevrolet
99	David Starr	B. J. McLeod Motorsports with SS-Green Light Racing	Chevrolet
Official entry list

== Practice ==
=== First practice ===
The first practice session was held on Friday, July 28, at 4:00 PM CST. The session would last for 55 minutes. Sam Hornish Jr. of Team Penske would set the fastest time in the session, with a lap of 24.721 and an average speed of 127.422 mph (205.066 km/h).

Pos	#	Driver	Team	Make	Time	Speed
1	22	Sam Hornish Jr.	Team Penske	Ford	24.721	127.422
2	7	Justin Allgaier	JR Motorsports	Chevrolet	24.773	127.155
3	20	Ryan Preece	Joe Gibbs Racing	Toyota	24.802	127.006
Full first practice results

=== Final practice ===
The final practice session was held on Friday, July 28, at 5:30 PM CST. The session would last for 55 minutes. Ben Kennedy of Richard Childress Racing would set the fastest time in the session, with a lap of 24.244 and an average speed of 129.929 mph (209.100 km/h).

Pos	#	Driver	Team	Make	Time	Speed
1	2	Ben Kennedy (R)	Richard Childress Racing	Chevrolet	24.244	129.929
2	20	Ryan Preece	Joe Gibbs Racing	Toyota	24.423	128.977
3	22	Sam Hornish Jr.	Team Penske	Ford	24.442	128.877
Full final practice results

== Qualifying ==
Qualifying was held on Saturday, July 29, at 11:00 AM CST. Since Iowa Speedway is under 2 miles (3.2 km) in length, the qualifying system was a multi-car system that included three rounds. The first round was 15 minutes, where every driver would be able to set a lap within the 15 minutes. Then, the second round would consist of the fastest 24 cars in Round 1, and drivers would have 10 minutes to set a lap. Round 3 consisted of the fastest 12 drivers from Round 2, and the drivers would have 5 minutes to set a time. Whoever was fastest in Round 3 would win the pole.

Ryan Preece of Joe Gibbs Racing would win the pole after advancing from both preliminary rounds and setting the fastest lap in Round 3, with a time of 24.072 and an average speed of 130.857 miles per hour (210.594 km/h).

Bobby Dale Earnhardt would fail to qualify.

=== Full qualifying results ===
Pos	#	Driver	Team	Make	Time (R1)	Speed (R1)	Time (R2)	Speed (R2)	Time (R3)	Speed (R3)
1	20	Ryan Preece	Joe Gibbs Racing	Toyota	24.307	129.592	24.151	130.429	24.072	130.857
2	18	Kyle Benjamin	Joe Gibbs Racing	Toyota	24.069	130.874	24.156	130.402	24.129	130.548
3	21	Daniel Hemric (R)	Richard Childress Racing	Chevrolet	24.268	129.801	24.261	129.838	24.181	130.268
4	22	Sam Hornish Jr.	Team Penske	Ford	24.349	129.369	24.158	130.392	24.192	130.208
5	00	Cole Custer (R)	Stewart–Haas Racing	Ford	24.262	129.833	24.104	130.684	24.193	130.203
6	1	Elliott Sadler	JR Motorsports	Chevrolet	24.457	128.797	24.289	129.688	24.200	130.165
7	11	Blake Koch	Kaulig Racing	Chevrolet	24.317	129.539	24.217	130.074	24.200	130.165
8	48	Brennan Poole	Chip Ganassi Racing	Chevrolet	24.264	129.822	24.308	129.587	24.218	130.069
9	60	Ty Majeski	Roush Fenway Racing	Ford	24.307	129.592	24.222	130.047	24.249	129.902
10	19	Matt Tifft (R)	Joe Gibbs Racing	Toyota	24.455	128.808	24.150	130.435	24.253	129.881
11	3	Brian Scott	Richard Childress Racing	Chevrolet	24.398	129.109	24.300	129.630	24.352	129.353
12	23	Spencer Gallagher (R)	GMS Racing	Chevrolet	24.448	128.845	24.295	129.656	24.443	128.871
Eliminated in Round 2
13	2	Ben Kennedy (R)	Richard Childress Racing	Chevrolet	24.387	129.167	24.317	129.539	-	-
14	7	Justin Allgaier	JR Motorsports	Chevrolet	24.386	129.172	24.350	129.363	-	-
15	42	Tyler Reddick	Chip Ganassi Racing	Chevrolet	24.414	129.024	24.353	129.348	-	-
16	62	Brendan Gaughan	Richard Childress Racing	Chevrolet	24.424	128.972	24.364	129.289	-	-
17	9	William Byron (R)	JR Motorsports	Chevrolet	24.395	129.125	24.407	129.061	-	-
18	16	Ryan Reed	Roush Fenway Racing	Ford	24.366	129.279	24.420	128.993	-	-
19	33	Brandon Jones	Richard Childress Racing	Chevrolet	24.393	129.135	24.423	128.977	-	-
20	28	Dakoda Armstrong	JGL Racing	Toyota	24.488	128.634	24.474	128.708	-	-
21	96	Brett Moffitt (i)	GMS Racing	Chevrolet	24.514	128.498	24.482	128.666	-	-
22	4	Ross Chastain	JD Motorsports	Chevrolet	24.613	127.981	24.551	128.304	-	-
23	5	Michael Annett	JR Motorsports	Chevrolet	24.610	127.997	24.588	128.111	-	-
24	93	Jeff Green	RSS Racing	Chevrolet	24.505	128.545	-	-	-	-
Eliminated in Round 1
25	39	Ryan Sieg	RSS Racing	Chevrolet	24.626	127.914	-	-	-	-
26	01	Harrison Rhodes	JD Motorsports	Chevrolet	24.641	127.836	-	-	-	-
27	51	Jeremy Clements	Jeremy Clements Racing	Chevrolet	24.683	127.618	-	-	-	-
28	14	J. J. Yeley	TriStar Motorsports	Toyota	24.703	127.515	-	-	-	-
29	15	Reed Sorenson (i)	JD Motorsports	Chevrolet	24.740	127.324	-	-	-	-
30	52	Joey Gase	Jimmy Means Racing	Chevrolet	24.743	127.309	-	-	-	-
31	8	B. J. McLeod	B. J. McLeod Motorsports	Chevrolet	24.769	127.175	-	-	-	-
32	24	Dylan Lupton	JGL Racing	Toyota	24.771	127.165	-	-	-	-
33	89	Morgan Shepherd	Shepherd Racing Ventures	Chevrolet	24.820	126.914	-	-	-	-
Qualified by owner's points
34	0	Garrett Smithley	JD Motorsports	Chevrolet	24.976	126.121	-	-	-	-
35	78	Tommy Joe Martins	B. J. McLeod Motorsports	Chevrolet	25.008	125.960	-	-	-	-
36	99	David Starr	BJMM with SS-Green Light Racing	Chevrolet	25.120	125.398	-	-	-	-
37	07	Ray Black Jr.	SS-Green Light Racing	Chevrolet	25.155	125.224	-	-	-	-
38	90	Brandon Brown	Brandonbilt Motorsports	Chevrolet	25.266	124.673	-	-	-	-
39	40	Stan Mullis	MBM Motorsports	Chevrolet	26.050	120.921	-	-	-	-
Qualified by time
40	74	Mike Harmon	Mike Harmon Racing	Dodge	26.109	120.648	-	-	-	-
Failed to qualify
41	13	Bobby Dale Earnhardt	MBM Motorsports	Chevrolet	26.063	120.861	-	-	-	-
Official qualifying results
Official starting lineup

== Race results ==
Stage 1 Laps: 60

Pos	#	Driver	Team	Make	Pts
1	20	Ryan Preece	Joe Gibbs Racing	Toyota	10
2	1	Elliott Sadler	JR Motorsports	Chevrolet	9
3	18	Kyle Benjamin	Joe Gibbs Racing	Toyota	8
4	48	Brennan Poole	Chip Ganassi Racing	Chevrolet	7
5	22	Sam Hornish Jr.	Team Penske	Ford	6
6	7	Justin Allgaier	JR Motorsports	Chevrolet	5
7	00	Cole Custer (R)	Stewart–Haas Racing	Ford	4
8	19	Matt Tifft (R)	Joe Gibbs Racing	Toyota	3
9	2	Ben Kennedy (R)	Richard Childress Racing	Chevrolet	2
10	11	Blake Koch	Kaulig Racing	Chevrolet	1

Stage 2 Laps: 60

Pos	#	Driver	Team	Make	Pts
1	7	Justin Allgaier	JR Motorsports	Chevrolet	10
2	20	Ryan Preece	Joe Gibbs Racing	Toyota	9
3	1	Elliott Sadler	JR Motorsports	Chevrolet	8
4	2	Ben Kennedy (R)	Richard Childress Racing	Chevrolet	7
5	18	Kyle Benjamin	Joe Gibbs Racing	Toyota	6
6	48	Brennan Poole	Chip Ganassi Racing	Chevrolet	5
7	22	Sam Hornish Jr.	Team Penske	Ford	4
8	00	Cole Custer (R)	Stewart–Haas Racing	Ford	3
9	60	Ty Majeski	Roush Fenway Racing	Ford	2
10	19	Matt Tifft (R)	Joe Gibbs Racing	Toyota	1

Stage 3 Laps: 134

Pos	#	Driver	Team	Make	Laps	Led	Status	Pts
1	20	Ryan Preece	Joe Gibbs Racing	Toyota	254	141	Running	59
2	18	Kyle Benjamin	Joe Gibbs Racing	Toyota	254	5	Running	49
3	3	Brian Scott	Richard Childress Racing	Chevrolet	254	0	Running	34
4	48	Brennan Poole	Chip Ganassi Racing	Chevrolet	254	0	Running	45
5	00	Cole Custer (R)	Stewart–Haas Racing	Ford	254	0	Running	39
6	14	J. J. Yeley	TriStar Motorsports	Toyota	254	0	Running	31
7	21	Daniel Hemric (R)	Richard Childress Racing	Chevrolet	254	0	Running	30
8	11	Blake Koch	Kaulig Racing	Chevrolet	254	0	Running	30
9	9	William Byron (R)	JR Motorsports	Chevrolet	254	0	Running	28
10	33	Brandon Jones	Richard Childress Racing	Chevrolet	254	0	Running	27
11	96	Brett Moffitt (i)	GMS Racing	Chevrolet	254	0	Running	0
12	1	Elliott Sadler	JR Motorsports	Chevrolet	254	2	Running	42
13	62	Brendan Gaughan	Richard Childress Racing	Chevrolet	254	0	Running	24
14	39	Ryan Sieg	RSS Racing	Chevrolet	254	0	Running	23
15	01	Harrison Rhodes	JD Motorsports	Chevrolet	254	0	Running	22
16	60	Ty Majeski	Roush Fenway Racing	Ford	254	0	Running	23
17	28	Dakoda Armstrong	JGL Racing	Toyota	254	0	Running	20
18	4	Ross Chastain	JD Motorsports	Chevrolet	254	0	Running	19
19	19	Matt Tifft (R)	Joe Gibbs Racing	Toyota	253	0	Running	22
20	7	Justin Allgaier	JR Motorsports	Chevrolet	252	106	Running	32
21	16	Ryan Reed	Roush Fenway Racing	Ford	252	0	Running	16
22	8	B. J. McLeod	B. J. McLeod Motorsports	Chevrolet	252	0	Running	15
23	2	Ben Kennedy (R)	Richard Childress Racing	Chevrolet	251	0	Running	23
24	52	Joey Gase	Jimmy Means Racing	Chevrolet	249	0	Running	13
25	24	Dylan Lupton	JGL Racing	Toyota	249	0	RUnning	12
26	99	David Starr	BJMM with SS-Green Light Racing	Chevrolet	249	0	Running	11
27	78	Tommy Joe Martins	B. J. McLeod Motorsports	Chevrolet	249	0	Running	10
28	51	Jeremy Clements	Jeremy Clements Racing	Chevrolet	249	0	Running	9
29	90	Brandon Brown	Brandonbilt Motorsports	Chevrolet	248	0	Running	8
30	07	Ray Black Jr.	SS-Green Light Racing	Chevrolet	247	0	Running	7
31	74	Mike Harmon	Mike Harmon Racing	Dodge	243	0	Running	6
32	40	Stan Mullis	MBM Motorsports	Chevrolet	241	0	Running	5
33	5	Michael Annett	JR Motorsports	Chevrolet	233	0	Running	4
34	22	Sam Hornish Jr.	Team Penske	Ford	229	0	Accident	13
35	0	Garrett Smithley	JD Motorsports	Chevrolet	218	0	Accident	2
36	42	Tyler Reddick	Chip Ganassi Racing	Chevrolet	218	0	Running	1
37	23	Spencer Gallagher (R)	GMS Racing	Chevrolet	170	0	Accident	1
38	89	Morgan Shepherd	Shepherd Racing Ventures	Chevrolet	46	0	Handling	1
39	15	Reed Sorenson (i)	JD Motorsports	Chevrolet	9	0	Transmission	0
40	93	Jeff Green	RSS Racing	Chevrolet	3	0	Vibration	1
Official race results

== Standings after the race ==
Drivers' Championship standings

Pos	Driver	Points
1	Elliott Sadler	707
2	William Byron	653 (–54)
3	Justin Allgaier	564 (–143)
4	Brennan Poole	518 (–189)
5	Daniel Hemric	488 (–219)
6	Cole Custer	474 (–233)
7	Matt Tifft	436 (–271)
8	Ryan Reed	424 (–283)
9	Dakoda Armstrong	388 (–319)
10	Blake Koch	374 (–333)
11	Michael Annett	371 (–336)
12	Brendan Gaughan	353 (–354)
Official driver's standings

- Note: Only the first 12 positions are included for the driver standings.

Previous race: 2017 Lilly Diabetes 250	NASCAR Xfinity Series; 2017 season	Next race: 2017 Zippo 200 at The Glen
