= Stephen Young (racing driver) =

British racing driver

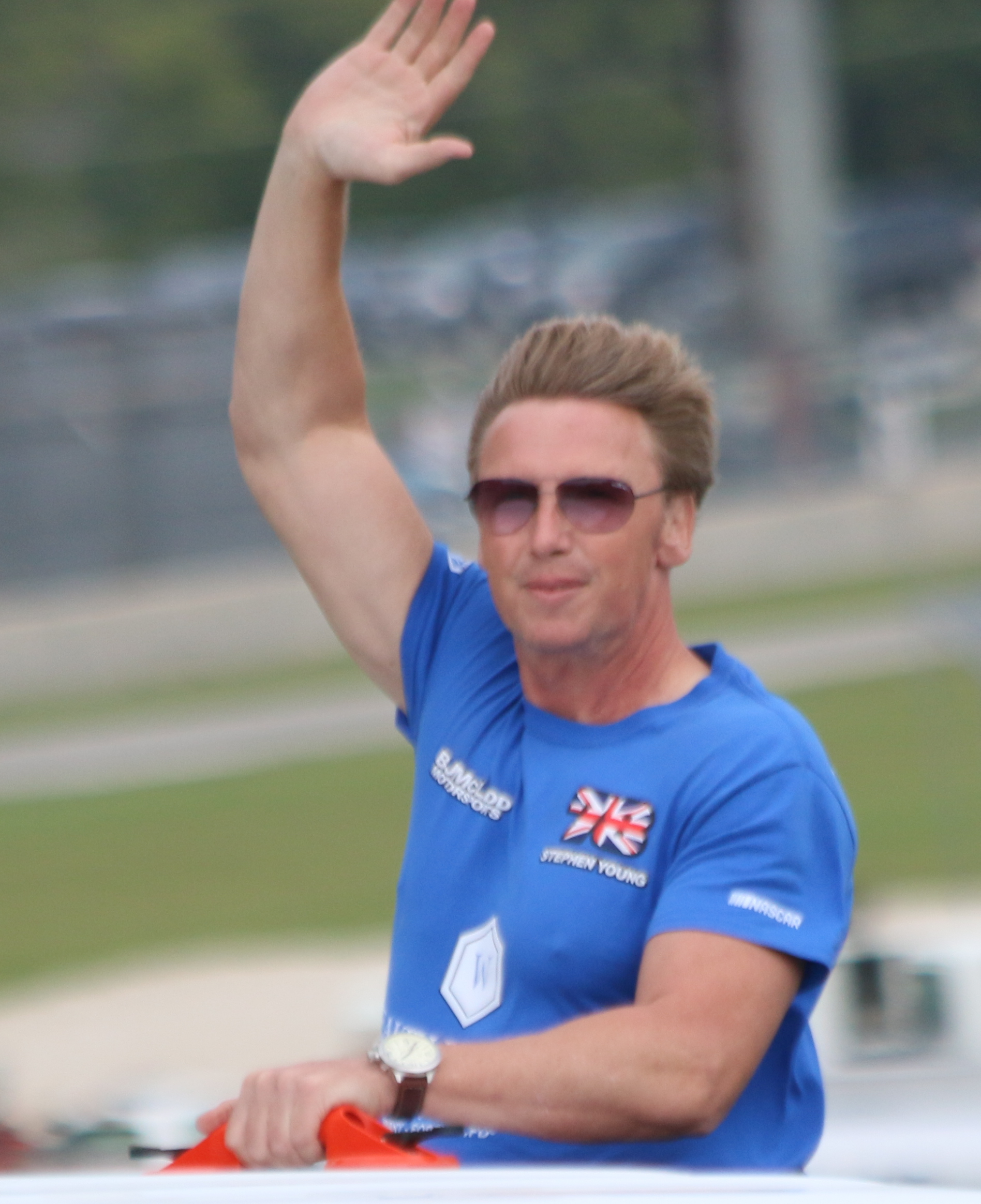
- Young at Road America in 2017
- Born: 7 June 1969 (age 57); Newcastle upon Tyne, England

NASCAR O'Reilly Auto Parts Series career
- 3 races run over 1 year
- 2017 position: 61st
- Best finish: 61st (2017)
- First race: 2017 Zippo 200 at The Glen (Watkins Glen)
- Last race: 2017 Johnsonville 180 (Road America)
| Wins | Top tens | Poles |
|---|---|---|
| 0 | 0 | 0 |
- Statistics up to date as of February 27, 2018.

Stephen Young (born 7 June 1969) is a British professional stock car racing driver. He last competed part-time in the Xfinity Series, driving the No. 78 Chevrolet Camaro for B. J. McLeod Motorsports.

== Racing career ==
=== Xfinity Series ===
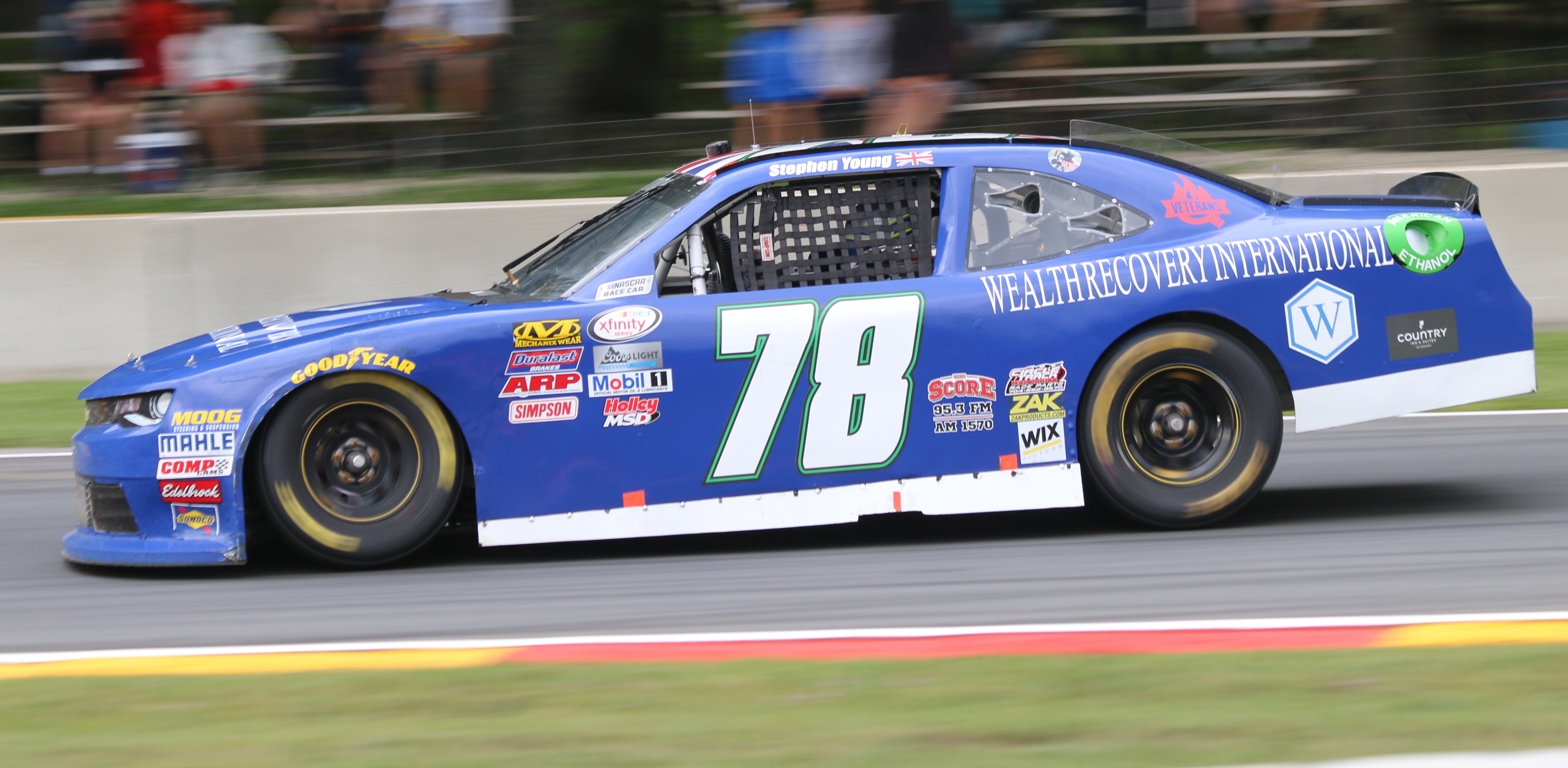
Young's No. 78 at Road America

Young made his Xfinity debut at Watkins Glen, driving the No. 78 car for B.J. McLeod Motorsports. He started 39th and finished 36th after a transmission failure. Young drove again for the team at Mid-Ohio. He started 37th and finished 24th, which was a significant improvement on his last race. He drove once again at Road America, starting 36th and finishing 34th, 3 laps down.

== Motorsports career results ==
=== NASCAR ===
(key) (Bold – Pole position awarded by qualifying time. Italics – Pole position earned by points standings or practice time. * – Most laps led. ** – All laps led.)

==== Xfinity Series ====
NASCAR Xfinity Series results
| Year | Team | No. | Make | 1 | 2 | 3 | 4 | 5 | 6 | 7 | 8 | 9 | 10 | 11 | 12 | 13 | 14 | 15 | 16 | 17 | 18 | 19 | 20 | 21 | 22 | 23 | 24 | 25 | 26 | 27 | 28 | 29 | 30 | 31 | 32 | 33 | NXSC | Pts | Ref |
|---|---|---|---|---|---|---|---|---|---|---|---|---|---|---|---|---|---|---|---|---|---|---|---|---|---|---|---|---|---|---|---|---|---|---|---|---|---|---|---|
| 2017 | B. J. McLeod Motorsports | 78 | Chevy | DAY | ATL | LVS | PHO | CAL | TEX | BRI | RCH | TAL | CLT | DOV | POC | MCH | IOW | DAY | KEN | NHA | IND | IOW | GLN; 36 | MOH; 24 | BRI | ROA; 34 | DAR | RCH | CHI | KEN | DOV | CLT | KAN | TEX | PHO | HOM | 61st | 17 | |

==== Whelen Euro Series – Elite 2 ====
NASCAR Whelen Euro Series – Elite 2 results
| Year | Team | No. | Make | 1 | 2 | 3 | 4 | 5 | 6 | 7 | 8 | 9 | 10 | 11 | 12 | NWES | Pts |
|---|---|---|---|---|---|---|---|---|---|---|---|---|---|---|---|---|---|
| 2018 | Racing Total | 10 | Chevy | VAL | VAL | FRA | FRA | BRH | BRH | TOU; 19 | TOU; 11 | HOC | HOC | ZOL | ZOL | 35th | 44 |

^{*} Season still in progress
^{1} Ineligible for series points
