= Enrique Baca =

Mexican racing driver (b. 1996)

- Born: January 30, 1990 (age 36); Monterrey, Mexico

NASCAR O'Reilly Auto Parts Series career
- 2 races run over 1 year
- 2017 position: 57th
- Best finish: 57th (2017)
- First race: 2017 Zippo 200 at The Glen (Watkins Glen)
- Last race: 2017 Mid-Ohio Challenge (Mid-Ohio)
Wins	Top tens	Poles
0	0	0
- Statistics up to date as of January 26, 2018.

Enrique "Tatita" Baca (born January 30, 1990) is a Mexican professional stock car racing driver. He currently competes in the NASCAR PEAK Mexico Series, for the Commescope Telcel team.

== Racing career ==
=== Xfinity Series ===
Baca made his Xfinity Series debut at Watkins Glen, driving the No. 40 car for MBM Motorsports in a partnership with NextGen Motorsports. He started 35th and finished 31st in his Xfinity Series debut. He competed in the next race at Watkins Glen. This time, he drove the No. 13 car, also for MBM Motorsports in a partnership with NextGen Motorsports. He started 29th, and finished 18th, improving greatly on his previous result.

On January 22, 2018, it was announced that Baca would be racing for NextGen Motorsports part-time along with Marcos Gomes and Landon Huffman. However, this did not transpire due to a lack of sponsorship and the team encountering financial problems. NextGen would not field their Xfinity team and only compete in the Truck and K&N East Series that year.

In February 2025, it was announced that Baca was selected to be the lead stock car driver for the Commescope Telcel team in the 2025 NASCAR Mexico Series season. This marked the return of Baca to the Telmex-Telcel Racing team full-time after eight years.

== Motorsports career results ==
=== NASCAR ===
(key) (Bold – Pole position awarded by qualifying time. Italics – Pole position earned by points standings or practice time. * – Most laps led.)

==== Xfinity Series ====
NASCAR Xfinity Series results
Year	Team	No.	Make	1	2	3	4	5	6	7	8	9	10	11	12	13	14	15	16	17	18	19	20	21	22	23	24	25	26	27	28	29	30	31	32	33	NXSC	Pts	Ref
2017	MBM Motorsports	40	Toyota	DAY	ATL	LVS	PHO	CAL	TEX	BRI	RCH	TAL	CLT	DOV	POC	MCH	IOW	DAY	KEN	NHA	IND	IOW	GLN; 31														57th	25	
2017	MBM Motorsports	13	Dodge																					MOH; 18	BRI	ROA	DAR	RCH	CHI	KEN	DOV	CLT	KAN	TEX	PHO	HOM	57th	25	

^{*} Season still in progress
^{1} Ineligible for series points

==== K&N Pro Series East ====
NASCAR K&N Pro Series East results
Year	Team	No.	Make	1	2	3	4	5	6	7	8	9	10	11	12	13	14	NKNPSEC	Pts	Ref
2016	Rev Racing	42	Toyota	NSM	MOB	GRE	BRI	VIR	DOM	STA	COL	NHA	IOW	GLN	GRE; 22	NJE; 11	DOV; 18	35th	81	
2017	NextGen Motorsports	9	Ford	NSM; 26	GRE; 15	BRI	SBO; 14	SBO; 9	MEM	BLN; 9	TMP; 14	NHA	IOW					12th	239	
2017	NextGen Motorsports	5	Chevy											GLN; 20	LGY	NJE		12th	239	
2017	NextGen Motorsports	25	Toyota														DOV; 6	12th	239	
