= 2017 NASCAR Xfinity Series =

American motorsport season

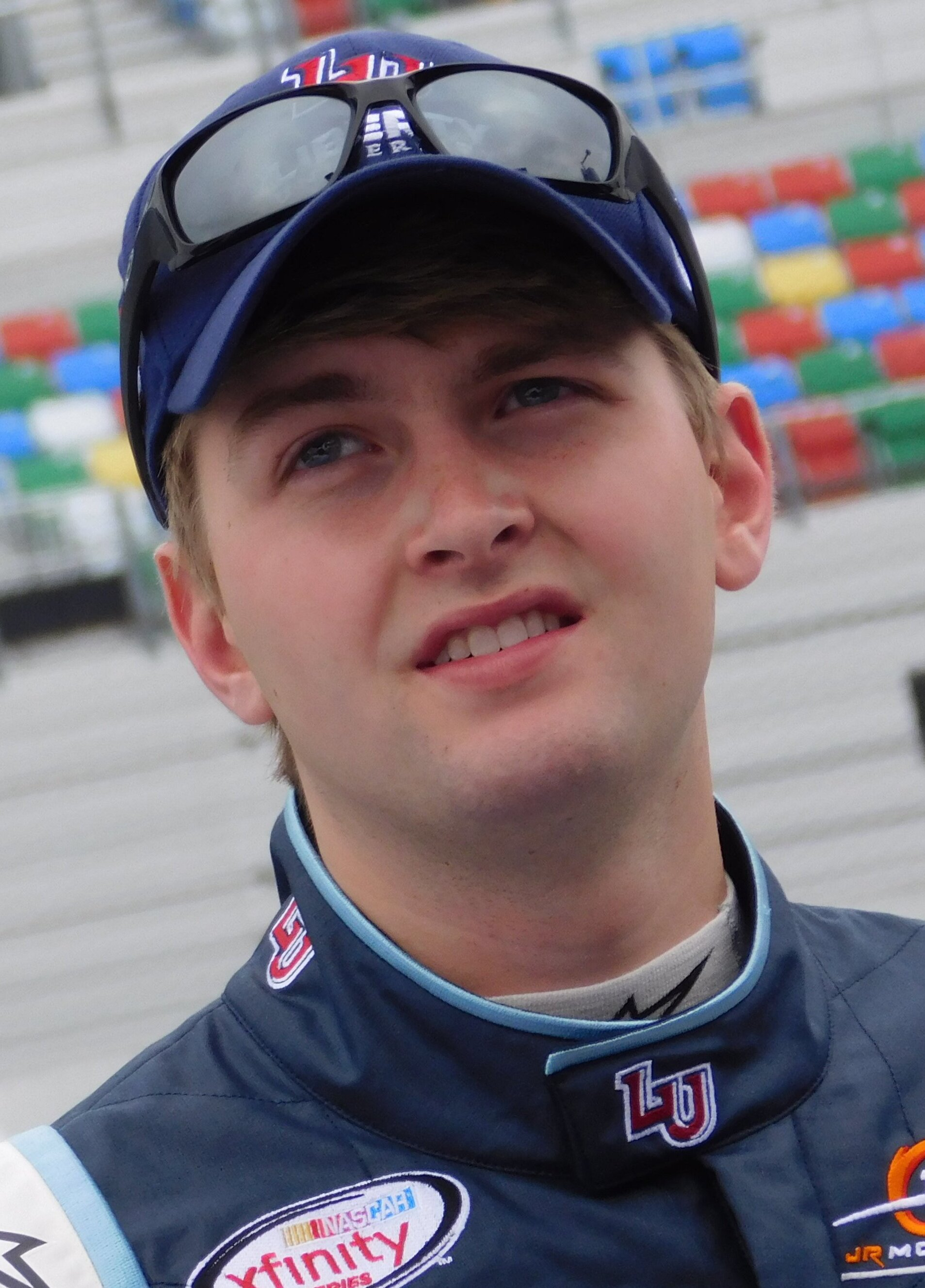
William Byron, the 2017 Xfinity Series champion as well as NASCAR Rookie of the Year.

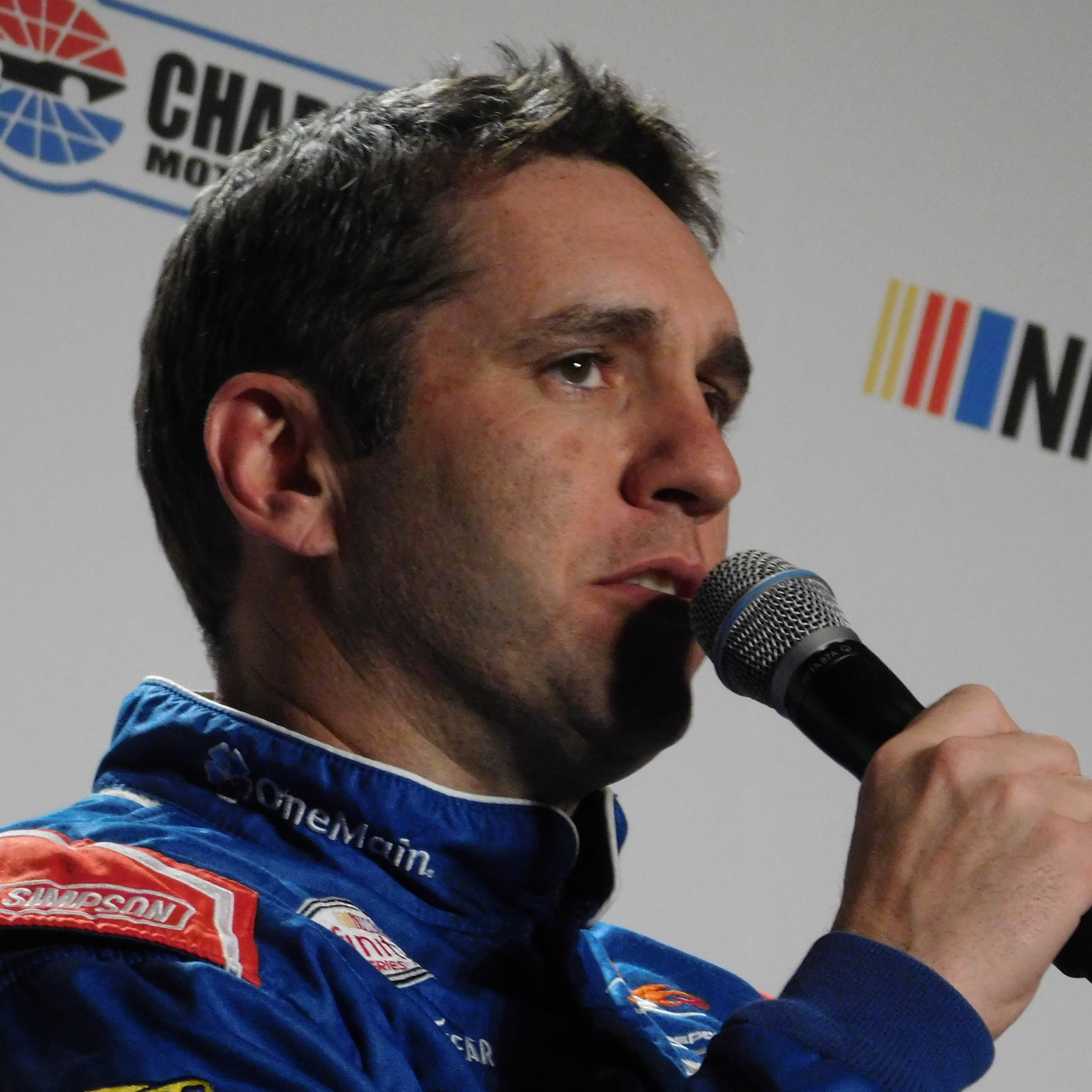
Elliott Sadler, the regular season champion, finished second behind Byron in the championship.

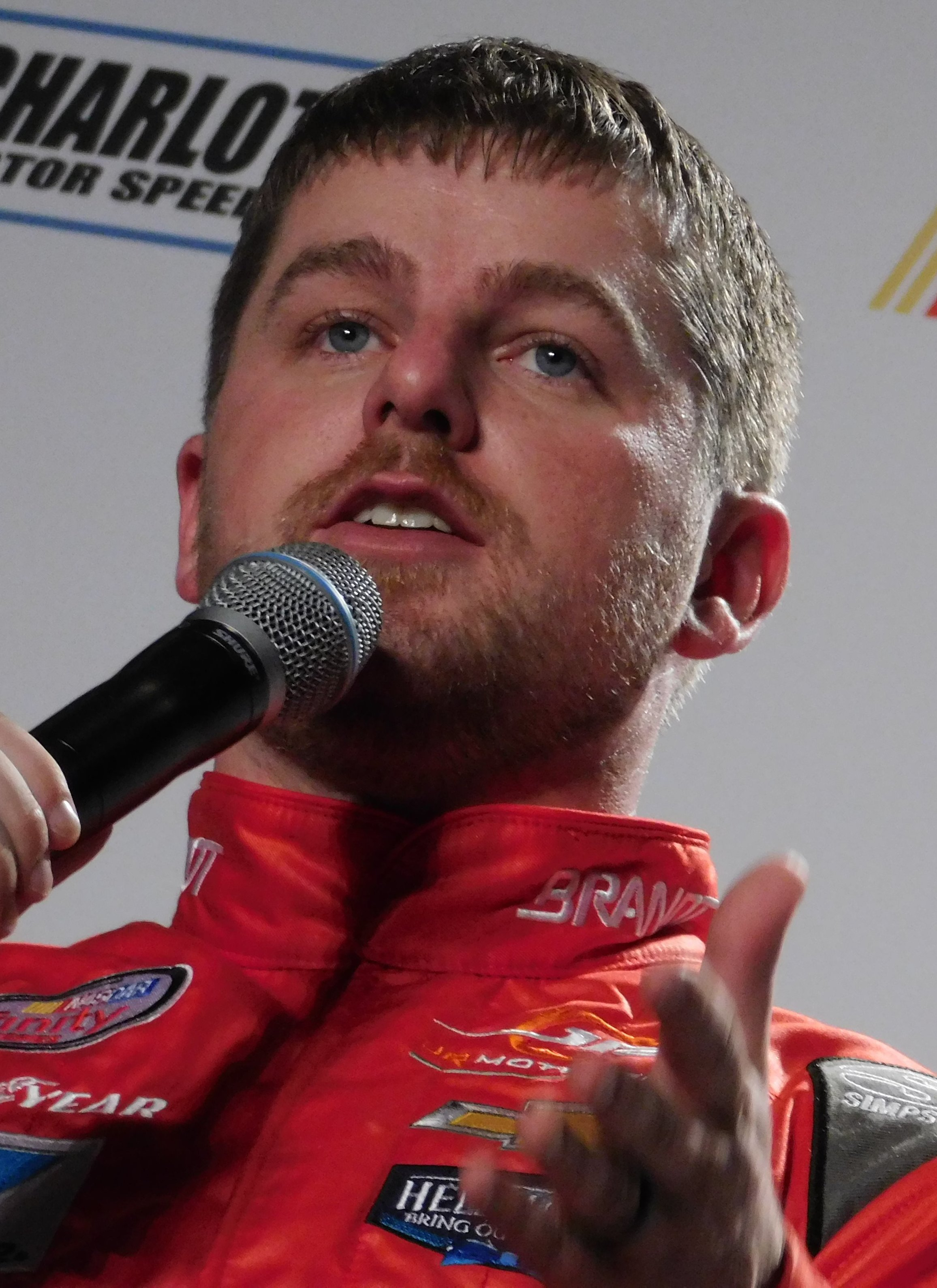
Justin Allgaier finished third in the championship.

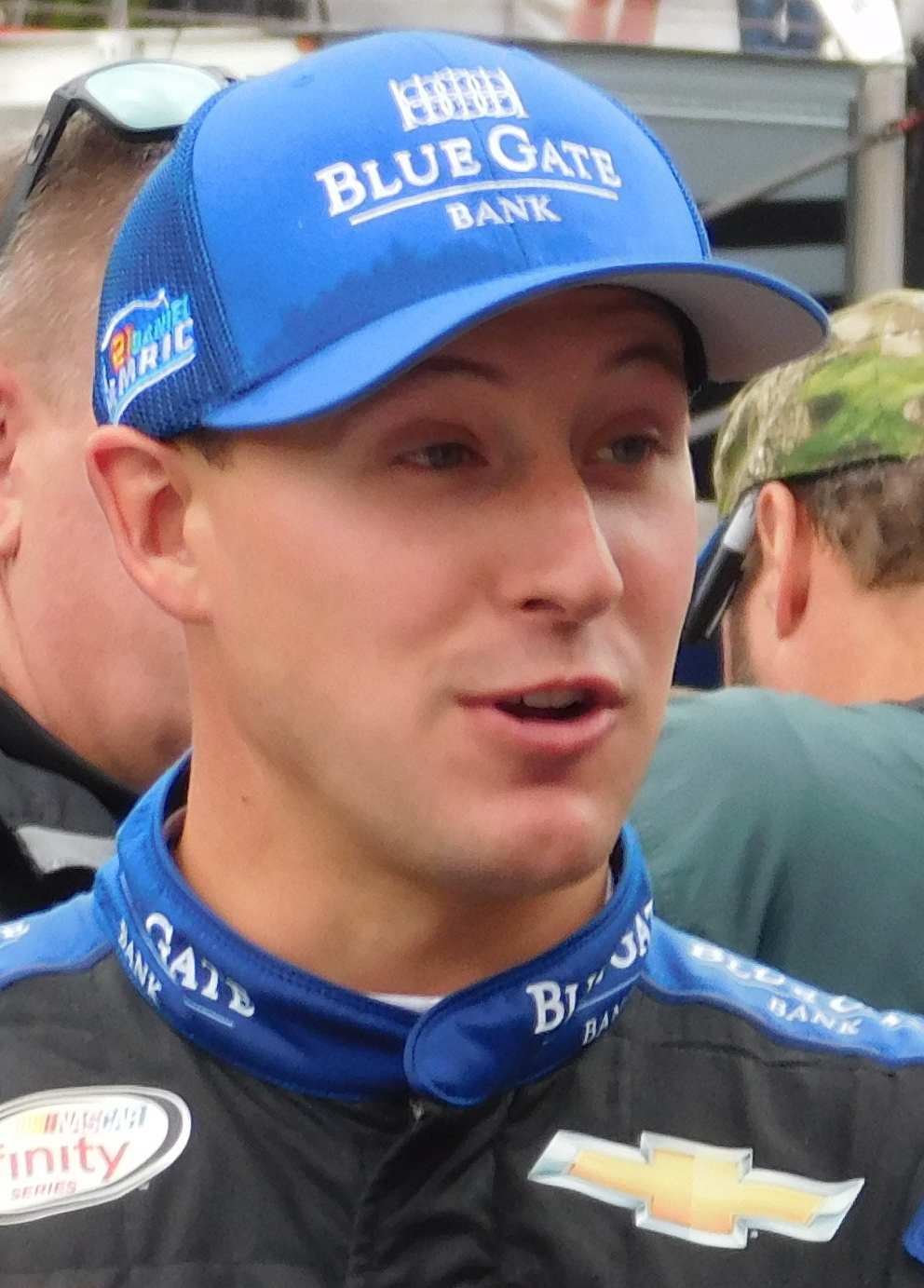
Daniel Hemric finished fourth in the championship.

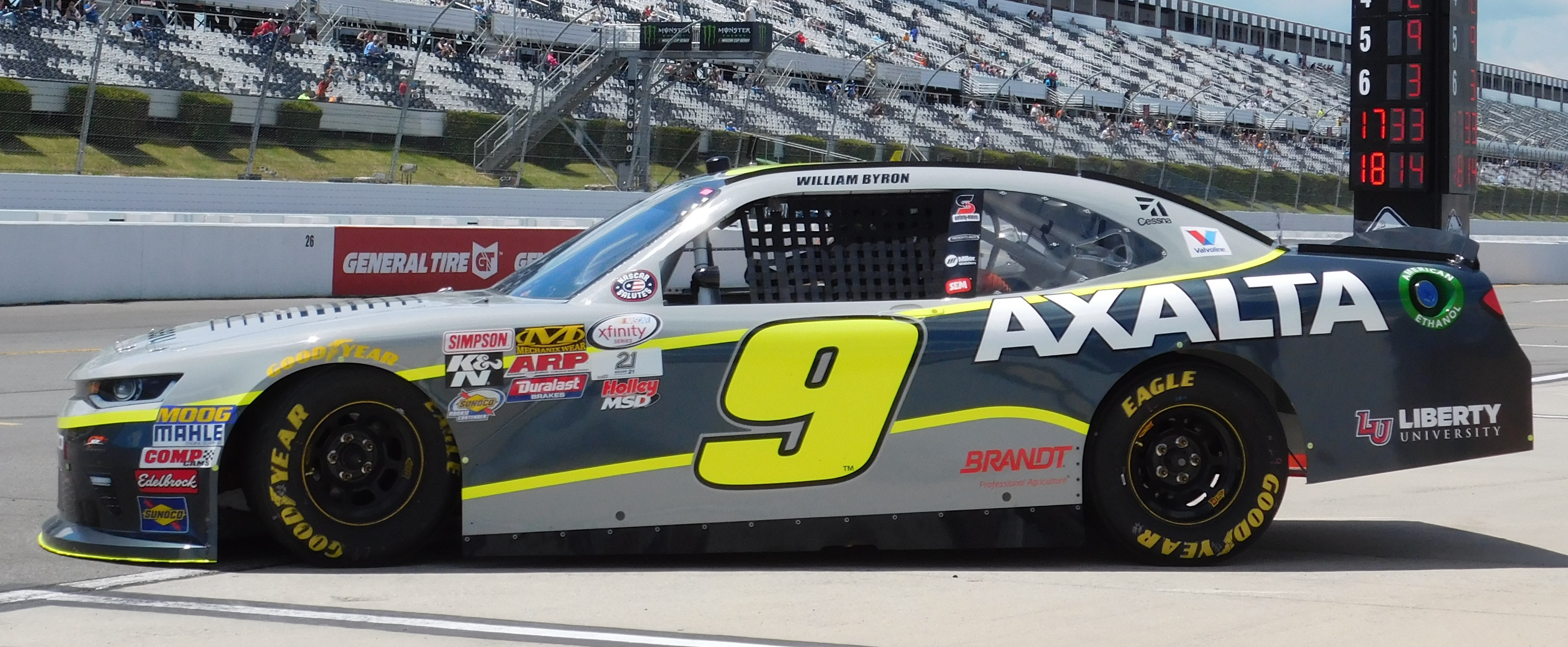
Chevy won the manufacturer's championship with 12 wins & 1195 points.

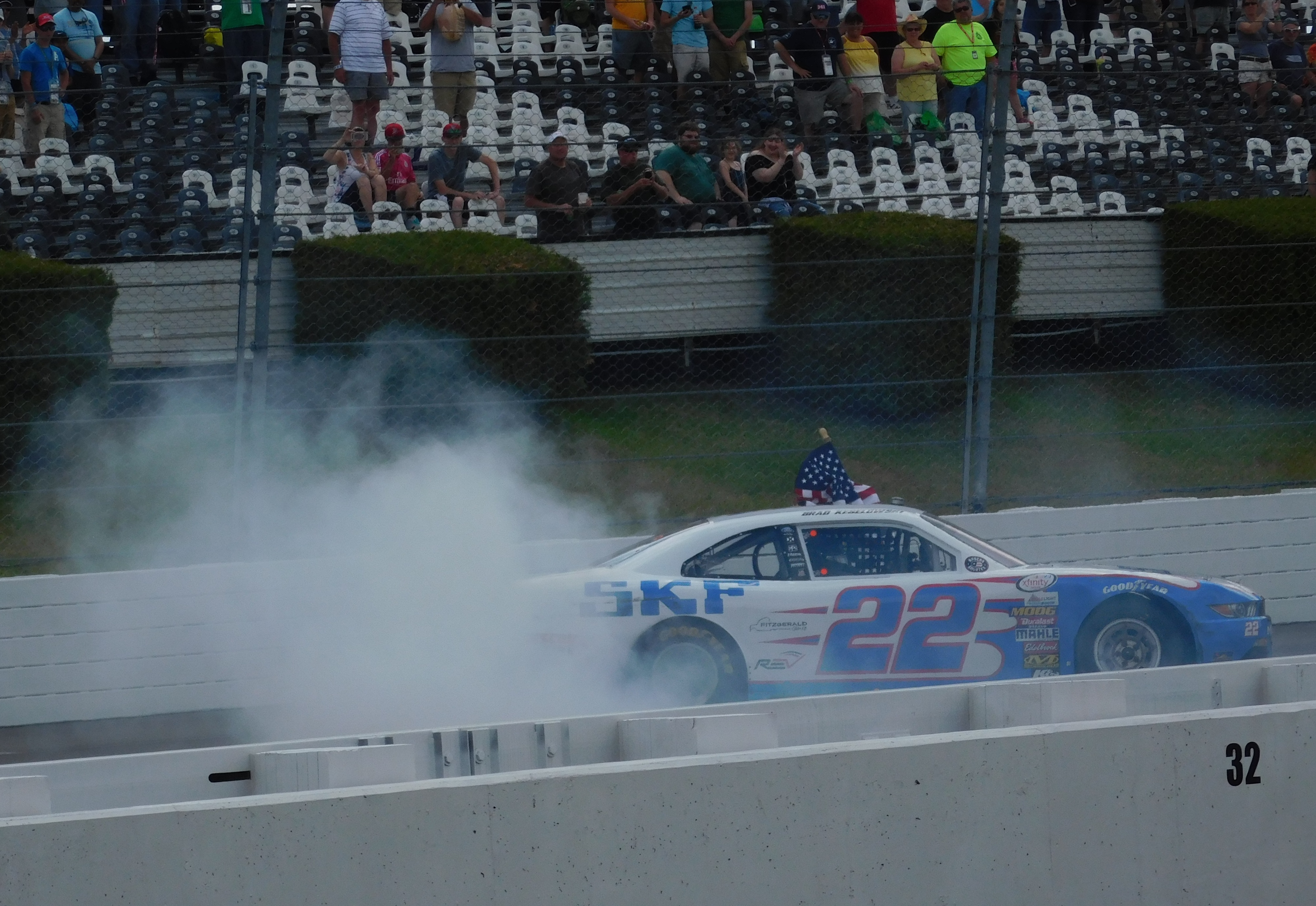
The 22 car for Team Penske won the owner's championship.

The 2017 NASCAR Xfinity Series was the 36th season of the NASCAR Xfinity Series, the second national professional stock car racing series sanctioned by NASCAR in the United States. The season began with the PowerShares QQQ 300 at Daytona International Speedway and ended with the Ford EcoBoost 300 at Homestead–Miami Speedway. Daniel Suárez was the defending drivers' champion while Toyota was the defending manufacturer's champion, although Suárez couldn't defend his title due to him racing in the Monster Energy NASCAR Cup Series.

During the season, races were broadcast by Fox Sports and NBC Sports for the third consecutive year.

William Byron of JR Motorsports won the driver's championship with a third-place finish in the season finale. Team Penske won the owner's championship while Chevrolet won the manufacturer's championship.

This was the second year that the Xfinity Series (and the Truck Series) had a playoff system. Two of the four "championship 4" drivers (who are shown below), were the same as last year's, the only differences being William Byron and Daniel Hemric were in it instead of Daniel Suárez and Erik Jones, who both moved up to the Cup Series full-time in 2017. Also, three of the four of them (Byron, Sadler, and Allgaier) all drove for JR Motorsports. As Hemric, the other driver in the "championship 4", drove for Richard Childress Racing, that meant that the "championship 4" was composed entirely of Chevrolet drivers. Also ironically, Sadler and Allgaier both ended up finishing in the same positions in the standings as they did in 2016, second and third, respectfully.

== Teams and drivers ==
=== Complete schedule ===
Manufacturer	Team	No.	Race driver	Crew chief
Chevrolet	B. J. McLeod Motorsports; SS-Green Light Racing	99	David Starr	Ken Evans
Chevrolet	Chip Ganassi Racing	42	Tyler Reddick 18	Mike Shiplett
Chevrolet	Chip Ganassi Racing	42	Kyle Larson 11	Mike Shiplett
Chevrolet	Chip Ganassi Racing	42	Justin Marks 2	Mike Shiplett
Chevrolet	Chip Ganassi Racing	42	Alex Bowman 2	Mike Shiplett
Chevrolet	Chip Ganassi Racing	48	Brennan Poole	Chad Norris
Chevrolet	GMS Racing	23	Spencer Gallagher (R)	Joey Cohen
Chevrolet	JD Motorsports	0	Garrett Smithley 32	Wayne Setterington Jr. 30; Rick Johnson 1 Bryan Berry 1
Chevrolet	JD Motorsports	0	Vinnie Miller 1	Wayne Setterington Jr. 30; Rick Johnson 1 Bryan Berry 1
Chevrolet	JD Motorsports	01	Harrison Rhodes 30	Patrick Magee 1 Rob Winfield 4 Tommy MacHek 28; Patrick Donahue 1
Chevrolet	JD Motorsports	01	Sheldon Creed 2	Patrick Magee 1 Rob Winfield 4 Tommy MacHek 28; Patrick Donahue 1
Chevrolet	JD Motorsports	01	Joe Nemechek 1	Patrick Magee 1 Rob Winfield 4 Tommy MacHek 28; Patrick Donahue 1
Chevrolet	JD Motorsports	4	Ross Chastain	Evan Snider
Chevrolet	Jeremy Clements Racing	51	Jeremy Clements	Tony Clements 32; Danny Gill 1
Chevrolet	Jimmy Means Racing	52	Joey Gase	Tim Brown
Chevrolet	JR Motorsports	1	Elliott Sadler	Kevin Meendering
Chevrolet	JR Motorsports	5	Michael Annett	Jason Stockert
Chevrolet	JR Motorsports	7	Justin Allgaier	Jason Burdett 32; Chad Knaus1
Chevrolet	JR Motorsports	9	William Byron (R)	Dave Elenz
Chevrolet	Kaulig Racing	11	Blake Koch	Chris Rice
Chevrolet	DGM Racing	90	Mario Gosselin 8	Guy Caron 6 Mario Gosselin 5 Kevin Boykin 10
Chevrolet	DGM Racing	90	Martin Roy 4	Guy Caron 6 Mario Gosselin 5 Kevin Boykin 10
Chevrolet	DGM Racing	90	Alex Labbé 2	Guy Caron 6 Mario Gosselin 5 Kevin Boykin 10
Chevrolet	DGM Racing	90	Josh Williams 4	Guy Caron 6 Mario Gosselin 5 Kevin Boykin 10
Chevrolet	DGM Racing	90	Dexter Bean 2	Guy Caron 6 Mario Gosselin 5 Kevin Boykin 10
Chevrolet	DGM Racing	90	Matt Bell 1	Guy Caron 6 Mario Gosselin 5 Kevin Boykin 10
Chevrolet	Brandonbilt Motorsports	90	Brandon Brown 11	Adam Brenner
Chevrolet	Brandonbilt Motorsports	90	Brian Henderson 1	Adam Brenner
Chevrolet	Richard Childress Racing	2	Austin Dillon 17	Justin Alexander 8 Matt Borland 1 Randall Burnett 19; Nick Harrison 5
Chevrolet	Richard Childress Racing	2	Paul Menard 7	Justin Alexander 8 Matt Borland 1 Randall Burnett 19; Nick Harrison 5
Chevrolet	Richard Childress Racing	2	Ben Kennedy (R) 9	Justin Alexander 8 Matt Borland 1 Randall Burnett 19; Nick Harrison 5
Chevrolet	Richard Childress Racing	3	Ty Dillon 27	Matt Swiderski
Chevrolet	Richard Childress Racing	3	Scott Lagasse Jr. 4	Matt Swiderski
Chevrolet	Richard Childress Racing	3	Brian Scott 2	Matt Swiderski
Chevrolet	Richard Childress Racing	21	Daniel Hemric (R)	Danny Stockman Jr. 27; Chad Walter 1 Randall Burnett 5
Chevrolet	Richard Childress Racing	33	Brandon Jones	Nick Harrison 28; Brandon Thomas 5
Chevrolet	Richard Childress Racing	62	Brendan Gaughan	Shane Wilson
Chevrolet	RSS Racing	39	Ryan Sieg 32	Kevin Starland 31; Kevin Johnson 2
Chevrolet	RSS Racing	39	Stephen Leicht 1	Kevin Starland 31; Kevin Johnson 2
Chevrolet	SS-Green Light Racing	07	Ray Black Jr. 21	Jason Miller
Chevrolet	SS-Green Light Racing	07	Todd Bodine 1	Jason Miller
Chevrolet	SS-Green Light Racing	07	Spencer Boyd 6	Jason Miller
Chevrolet	SS-Green Light Racing	07	Korbin Forrister 2	Jason Miller
Chevrolet	SS-Green Light Racing	07	Devin Jones 1	Jason Miller
Chevrolet	SS-Green Light Racing	07	Andy Lally 1	Jason Miller
Chevrolet	SS-Green Light Racing	07	Ryan Ellis 1	Jason Miller
Ford	Roush Fenway Racing	16	Ryan Reed	Phil Gould
Ford	Stewart–Haas Racing	00	Cole Custer (R)	Jeff Meendering
Ford	Team Penske	22	Brad Keselowski 9	Greg Erwin
Ford	Team Penske	22	Ryan Blaney 11	Greg Erwin
Ford	Team Penske	22	Joey Logano 7	Greg Erwin
Ford	Team Penske	22	Sam Hornish Jr. 5	Greg Erwin
Ford	Team Penske	22	Austin Cindric 1	Greg Erwin
Toyota	Joe Gibbs Racing	18	Daniel Suárez 12	Scott Graves 4 Matt Lucas 1 Eric Phillips 28
Toyota	Joe Gibbs Racing	18	Kyle Busch 10	Scott Graves 4 Matt Lucas 1 Eric Phillips 28
Toyota	Joe Gibbs Racing	18	Christopher Bell 5	Scott Graves 4 Matt Lucas 1 Eric Phillips 28
Toyota	Joe Gibbs Racing	18	Kyle Benjamin 3	Scott Graves 4 Matt Lucas 1 Eric Phillips 28
Toyota	Joe Gibbs Racing	18	Regan Smith 1	Scott Graves 4 Matt Lucas 1 Eric Phillips 28
Toyota	Joe Gibbs Racing	18	Denny Hamlin 1	Scott Graves 4 Matt Lucas 1 Eric Phillips 28
Toyota	Joe Gibbs Racing	18	Ryan Preece 1	Scott Graves 4 Matt Lucas 1 Eric Phillips 28
Toyota	Joe Gibbs Racing	19	Matt Tifft (R)	Matt Beckman
Toyota	Joe Gibbs Racing	20	Erik Jones 18	Chris Gabehart 31; Jacob Canter 1 Matt Lucas 1
Toyota	Joe Gibbs Racing	20	Denny Hamlin 3	Chris Gabehart 31; Jacob Canter 1 Matt Lucas 1
Toyota	Joe Gibbs Racing	20	Daniel Suárez 2	Chris Gabehart 31; Jacob Canter 1 Matt Lucas 1
Toyota	Joe Gibbs Racing	20	Kyle Benjamin 2	Chris Gabehart 31; Jacob Canter 1 Matt Lucas 1
Toyota	Joe Gibbs Racing	20	Christopher Bell 3	Chris Gabehart 31; Jacob Canter 1 Matt Lucas 1
Toyota	Joe Gibbs Racing	20	Ryan Preece 3	Chris Gabehart 31; Jacob Canter 1 Matt Lucas 1
Toyota	Joe Gibbs Racing	20	James Davison 2	Chris Gabehart 31; Jacob Canter 1 Matt Lucas 1
Toyota	TriStar Motorsports	14	J. J. Yeley	Wally Rogers
Chevrolet 31 Toyota 2	B. J. McLeod Motorsports	8	Jeff Green 8	David Ingram 1 George Ingram 23; Keith Wolfe 9
Chevrolet 31 Toyota 2	B. J. McLeod Motorsports	8	Matt Mills 2	David Ingram 1 George Ingram 23; Keith Wolfe 9
Chevrolet 31 Toyota 2	B. J. McLeod Motorsports	8	B. J. McLeod 17	David Ingram 1 George Ingram 23; Keith Wolfe 9
Chevrolet 31 Toyota 2	B. J. McLeod Motorsports	8	Josh Bilicki 3	David Ingram 1 George Ingram 23; Keith Wolfe 9
Chevrolet 31 Toyota 2	B. J. McLeod Motorsports	8	Tommy Joe Martins 1	David Ingram 1 George Ingram 23; Keith Wolfe 9
Chevrolet 31 Toyota 2	B. J. McLeod Motorsports	8	Caesar Bacarella 2	David Ingram 1 George Ingram 23; Keith Wolfe 9
Chevrolet 31 Toyota 2	B. J. McLeod Motorsports	78	Clint King 2	Keith Wolfe 24; George Ingram 9
Chevrolet 31 Toyota 2	B. J. McLeod Motorsports	78	B. J. McLeod 9	Keith Wolfe 24; George Ingram 9
Chevrolet 31 Toyota 2	B. J. McLeod Motorsports	78	Jeff Green 1	Keith Wolfe 24; George Ingram 9
Chevrolet 31 Toyota 2	B. J. McLeod Motorsports	78	Jordan Anderson 1	Keith Wolfe 24; George Ingram 9
Chevrolet 31 Toyota 2	B. J. McLeod Motorsports	78	Tommy Joe Martins 8	Keith Wolfe 24; George Ingram 9
Chevrolet 31 Toyota 2	B. J. McLeod Motorsports	78	Angela Ruch 4	Keith Wolfe 24; George Ingram 9
Chevrolet 31 Toyota 2	B. J. McLeod Motorsports	78	Stephen Young 3	Keith Wolfe 24; George Ingram 9
Chevrolet 31 Toyota 2	B. J. McLeod Motorsports	78	John Graham 2	Keith Wolfe 24; George Ingram 9
Chevrolet 31 Toyota 2	B. J. McLeod Motorsports	78	Josh Bilicki 2	Keith Wolfe 24; George Ingram 9
Chevrolet 31 Toyota 2	B. J. McLeod Motorsports	78	Jennifer Jo Cobb 1	Keith Wolfe 24; George Ingram 9
Toyota 14 Chevrolet 5 Dodge 14	MBM Motorsports	13	Mark Thompson 3	Jason Houghtaling 13; David Jones 7 Michael Rathje 2 George Church 1 Sebastian LaForge 10
Toyota 14 Chevrolet 5 Dodge 14	MBM Motorsports	13	Carl Long 11	Jason Houghtaling 13; David Jones 7 Michael Rathje 2 George Church 1 Sebastian LaForge 10
Toyota 14 Chevrolet 5 Dodge 14	MBM Motorsports	13	Brandon Hightower 1	Jason Houghtaling 13; David Jones 7 Michael Rathje 2 George Church 1 Sebastian LaForge 10
Toyota 14 Chevrolet 5 Dodge 14	MBM Motorsports	13	Timmy Hill 15	Jason Houghtaling 13; David Jones 7 Michael Rathje 2 George Church 1 Sebastian LaForge 10
Toyota 14 Chevrolet 5 Dodge 14	MBM Motorsports	13	Bobby Dale Earnhardt 1	Jason Houghtaling 13; David Jones 7 Michael Rathje 2 George Church 1 Sebastian LaForge 10
Toyota 14 Chevrolet 5 Dodge 14	MBM Motorsports	13	Enrique Baca 1 (Note: Entry was fielded in a collaboration with NextGen Motorsports.)	Jason Houghtaling 13; David Jones 7 Michael Rathje 2 George Church 1 Sebastian LaForge 10
Toyota 14 Chevrolet 5 Dodge 14	MBM Motorsports	13	Ernie Francis Jr. 1	Jason Houghtaling 13; David Jones 7 Michael Rathje 2 George Church 1 Sebastian LaForge 10
Toyota 14 Chevrolet 5 Dodge 14	MBM Motorsports	13	John Jackson 1	Jason Houghtaling 13; David Jones 7 Michael Rathje 2 George Church 1 Sebastian LaForge 10
Toyota 7 Dodge 11 Chevrolet 14 Ford 1	MBM Motorsports	40	Brandon Hightower 2	David Jones 11; Jason Houghtaling 10; George Church 11; Timmy Hill 1
Toyota 7 Dodge 11 Chevrolet 14 Ford 1	MBM Motorsports	40	Timmy Hill 14	David Jones 11; Jason Houghtaling 10; George Church 11; Timmy Hill 1
Toyota 7 Dodge 11 Chevrolet 14 Ford 1	MBM Motorsports	40	Carl Long 1	David Jones 11; Jason Houghtaling 10; George Church 11; Timmy Hill 1
Toyota 7 Dodge 11 Chevrolet 14 Ford 1	MBM Motorsports	40	Chad Finchum 7	David Jones 11; Jason Houghtaling 10; George Church 11; Timmy Hill 1
Toyota 7 Dodge 11 Chevrolet 14 Ford 1	MBM Motorsports	40	Josh Bilicki 1	David Jones 11; Jason Houghtaling 10; George Church 11; Timmy Hill 1
Toyota 7 Dodge 11 Chevrolet 14 Ford 1	MBM Motorsports	40	Stan Mullis 1	David Jones 11; Jason Houghtaling 10; George Church 11; Timmy Hill 1
Toyota 7 Dodge 11 Chevrolet 14 Ford 1	MBM Motorsports	40	Enrique Baca 1	David Jones 11; Jason Houghtaling 10; George Church 11; Timmy Hill 1
Toyota 7 Dodge 11 Chevrolet 14 Ford 1	MBM Motorsports	40	Tim Cowen 2	David Jones 11; Jason Houghtaling 10; George Church 11; Timmy Hill 1
Toyota 7 Dodge 11 Chevrolet 14 Ford 1	MBM Motorsports	40	Bobby Dale Earnhardt 2	David Jones 11; Jason Houghtaling 10; George Church 11; Timmy Hill 1
Toyota 7 Dodge 11 Chevrolet 14 Ford 1	MBM Motorsports	40	Garrett Smithley 1	David Jones 11; Jason Houghtaling 10; George Church 11; Timmy Hill 1
Toyota 7 Dodge 11 Chevrolet 14 Ford 1	MBM Motorsports	40	John Jackson 1	David Jones 11; Jason Houghtaling 10; George Church 11; Timmy Hill 1
Dodge 32 Chevrolet 1	Mike Harmon Racing 32; Rick Ware Racing 1	74	Mike Harmon 28	R. B. Bracken 8 Joe Majenski 5 Robert Scott 14; Alan Collins Jr. 6
Dodge 32 Chevrolet 1	Mike Harmon Racing 32; Rick Ware Racing 1	74	Jordan Anderson 1	R. B. Bracken 8 Joe Majenski 5 Robert Scott 14; Alan Collins Jr. 6
Dodge 32 Chevrolet 1	Mike Harmon Racing 32; Rick Ware Racing 1	74	Cody Ware 2	R. B. Bracken 8 Joe Majenski 5 Robert Scott 14; Alan Collins Jr. 6
Dodge 32 Chevrolet 1	Mike Harmon Racing 32; Rick Ware Racing 1	74	John Graham 2	R. B. Bracken 8 Joe Majenski 5 Robert Scott 14; Alan Collins Jr. 6

=== Limited schedule ===
Manufacturer	Team	No.	Race driver	Crew chief	Rounds
Chevrolet	Chris Cockrum Racing	25	Chris Cockrum	Jeff Spraker	5
Chevrolet	Chris Cockrum Racing	25	P. J. Jones	Jeff Spraker	1
Chevrolet	GMS Racing	96	Ben Kennedy (R)	Jeff Stankiewicz	7
Chevrolet	GMS Racing	96	Brett Moffitt	Jeff Stankiewicz	1
Chevrolet	JD Motorsports	15	Reed Sorenson	Wayne Setterington Jr.	10
Chevrolet	JD Motorsports	15	Matt Mills	Wayne Setterington Jr.	1
Chevrolet	JD Motorsports	15	Joe Nemechek	Wayne Setterington Jr.	1
Chevrolet	JD Motorsports	15	Harrison Rhodes	Wayne Setterington Jr.	1
Chevrolet	JR Motorsports	88	Kasey Kahne	Scott Radel	2
Chevrolet	JR Motorsports	88	Dale Earnhardt Jr.	Scott Radel	2
Chevrolet	DGM Racing	92	Josh Williams	Kevin Boykin	3
Chevrolet	DGM Racing	92	Dexter Bean	Kevin Boykin	2
Chevrolet	Martins Motorsports	45	Tommy Joe Martins	Kevin Eagle	1
Chevrolet	Obaika Racing	77	Josh Bilicki	Glenn Kania	1
Chevrolet	Obaika Racing	77	Gregory Vandersluis	Dan Stillman	1
Chevrolet	Obaika Racing	97	Stephen Leicht	Bruce Cook 1 Lauryn Scott 4 Dan Stillman 1	6
Chevrolet	Precision Performance Motorsports	46	Anthony Kumpen	Mark Setzer	2
Chevrolet	Precision Performance Motorsports	46	Quin Houff	Mark Setzer	7
Chevrolet	Precision Performance Motorsports	46	Parker Kligerman	Mark Setzer	1
Chevrolet	RSS Racing	38	Gray Gaulding	Rudy Wade	1
Chevrolet	RSS Racing	38	Jeff Green	Rudy Wade	5
Chevrolet	RSS Racing	93	Jordan Anderson	Bruce Cook	6
Chevrolet	RSS Racing	93	Jeff Green	Bruce Cook	18
Chevrolet	RSS Racing	93	Stephen Leicht	Bruce Cook	1
Chevrolet	RSS Racing	93	Gray Gaulding	Bruce Cook	4
Chevrolet	RSS Racing	93	Ryan Sieg	Bruce Cook	1
Chevrolet	Shepherd Racing Ventures	89	Morgan Shepherd	Nick Hoechst	27
Dodge	Mike Harmon Racing	17	Nicolas Hammann	Jeff Spraker	1
Ford	Biagi-DenBeste Racing	98	Aric Almirola	Jon Hanson	5
Ford	Biagi-DenBeste Racing	98	Casey Mears	Jon Hanson	14
Ford	Biagi-DenBeste Racing	98	Bubba Wallace	Jon Hanson	1
Ford	Roush Fenway Racing	6	Bubba Wallace	Seth Barbour	12
Ford	Roush Fenway Racing	60	Ty Majeski	Seth Barbour	3
Ford	Stewart–Haas Racing	41	Kevin Harvick	Richard Boswell	6
Ford	Team Penske	12	Joey Logano	Brian Wilson	3
Ford	Team Penske	12	Ryan Blaney	Brian Wilson	2
Ford	Team Penske	12	Sam Hornish Jr.	Brian Wilson	1
Toyota	JGL Racing	24	Scott Lagasse Jr.	Clinton Cram	2
Toyota	JGL Racing	24	Corey LaJoie	Clinton Cram	6
Toyota	JGL Racing	24	Drew Herring	Clinton Cram	2
Toyota	JGL Racing	24	Jeb Burton	Clinton Cram	6
Toyota	JGL Racing	24	Dylan Lupton	Clinton Cram	14
Toyota	JGL Racing	24	Cale Conley	Clinton Cram	1
Toyota	JGL Racing	26	Scott Lagasse Jr.	Steven Gray	1
Toyota	JGL Racing	28	Dakoda Armstrong	Steven Lane	27
Toyota	NextGen Motorsports	55	Josh Berry	Teddy Brown	1
Toyota	NextGen Motorsports	55	Matt Mills	Teddy Brown	1
Toyota	TriStar Motorsports	44	Benny Gordon	Bryan Smith	1
Dodge	MBM Motorsports	72	John Jackson	Dave Jones	1
Toyota	MBM Motorsports	72	Carl Long	George Church	1

=== Changes ===
==== Teams ====
- Stewart–Haas Racing fielded the No. 00 Ford Mustang for the 2017 season.
- B. J. McLeod Motorsports fielded 3 full-time teams. The team previously fielded a 1 full-time team and 2 part-time teams.
- Rick Ware Racing shut down its No. 25 team and move to the Monster Energy NASCAR Cup Series and the Camping World Truck Series. However, they returned at Road America.
- Derrike Cope Racing announced on January 30 that it would shut down its No. 70 Chevrolet Camaro. Its owners' points were transferred to Stewart–Haas Racing.
- Team Penske was originally planned to run a second full-time team for the season, but didn't due to sponsorship problems. The team once again started a part-time basis, that started at Las Vegas.
- JGL Racing fielded 2 full-time teams. The team previously fielded 1 full-time team and 1 part-time team. However, at Chicagoland and Kentucky (fall) they entered only 1 team. On September 25, 2017, they announced that they would be releasing Dakoda Armstrong and would shut down the No. 28 Toyota Camry team effective immediately, due to a lack of funding. JGL also announced that they would focus their efforts on the No. 24 team for the remainder of the season.

==== Drivers ====
- Cole Custer drove the No. 00 Ford Mustang for Stewart–Haas Racing full-time in 2017. Custer drove the No. 00 Chevrolet Silverado full-time for JR Motorsports in the Camping World Truck Series and part-time in the Xfinity series, driving the No. 5 and No. 88 Chevrolet Camaro in 2016.
- William Byron drove the No. 9 Chevrolet Camaro full-time for JR Motorsports in 2017. Byron drove the No. 9 Toyota Tundra for Kyle Busch Motorsports full-time in the Camping World Truck Series in 2016.
- Daniel Hemric drove the No. 21 Chevrolet Camaro full-time for Richard Childress Racing in 2017. Hemric drove the No. 19 Ford F-150 for Brad Keselowski Racing in the Truck Series.
- Michael Annett drove the No. 5 Chevrolet Camaro full-time for JR Motorsports in 2017. His sponsor from the last couple years in Xfinty and Cup Pilot Flying J came up with him. Annett drove the No. 46 Chevrolet SS for HScott Motorsports from 2015 to 2016.
- Matt Tifft drove the No. 19 Toyota full-time for Joe Gibbs Racing in 2017, replacing Daniel Suárez who is moving to the Monster Energy Cup Series to drive for JGR. Tifft shared the No. 18 Toyota with Kyle Busch and other drivers in 2016.
- Tyler Reddick joined Chip Ganassi Racing, sharing the No. 42 Chevrolet with Kyle Larson. Reddick drove for Brad Keselowski Racing in the Camping World Truck Series for the previous three seasons. On August 1, it was announced that Justin Marks, who had driven part-time for Ganassi in 2016, would be returning to the No. 42 for the 2 races at Mid-Ohio and Road America. On September 29, it was announced that Alex Bowman would drive the No. 42 for 2 races at Charlotte in October and Phoenix in November. In 2016, Bowman drove part-time, driving the No. 88 car for both Hendrick Motorsports in the Monster Energy NASCAR Cup Series and JR Motorsports in the Xfinity series and earlier in 2017 he drove 1 race in the No. 24 GMS Racing Chevrolet in the NASCAR Camping World Truck Series.
- Spencer Gallagher moved up to the Xfinity Series full-time in 2017 with GMS Racing. Gallagher drove a partial Xfinity schedule and a full-time Truck schedule in 2015 and 2016.
- Ryan Preece departed from JD Motorsports to return to the Whelen Modified Tour. On July 5, it was announced that Preece would return to the Xfinity Series to drive the No. 20 Toyota Camry for Joe Gibbs Racing for 2 races at New Hampshire and Iowa in July. On August 3, following Preece's win at Iowa, it was announced that JGR would add another race to Preece's slate with him running the No. 20 at Kentucky in September. Preece also drove the No. 18 car for JGR at Homestead in November.
- Kevin Harvick drove the No. 41 Ford Mustang for Stewart–Haas Racing in 6 races with sponsorship from Bad Boy Buggies for Atlanta, Hunt Brothers Pizza for other 4 races and FIELDS Inc. for Watkins Glen. Harvick drove the No. 88 car last year for JR Motorsports.
- Jeff Green drove the No. 8 Chevrolet Camaro full-time for B. J. McLeod Motorsports. Green had previously start and parked for TriStar Motorsports and ran 3 races with B. J. in the No. 99 car. After failing to qualify at Charlotte Green was released from the team. Green now start and parks for RSS Racing. However, he returned to the No. 8 for Daytona.
- Casey Mears drove the No. 98 Ford Mustang in 12 races for Biagi-DenBeste Racing. His last race in this series was in 2010. Mears also replaced the injured Aric Almirola at Pocono and Daytona increasing his races to 14.
- Ty Majeski made his first Xfinity Series start at Iowa in June in the No. 60 car for Roush Fenway Racing and drove at Iowa in July. On November 9, 2017, it was announced that Majeski would run the No. 60 Ford Mustang in the season finale at Homestead.
- Scott Lagasse Jr. drove the No. 3 Chevrolet Camaro for Richard Childress Racing at Iowa in June, Road America, Mid-Ohio, and Homestead sharing the ride with Ty Dillon, who drove the car for 27 races. On July 3, it was announced that Brian Scott would come out of retirement to drive the car at Iowa in July and Kentucky in September. Scott had previously competed for RCR in the Xfinity Series from 2013–2015. In 2016, Scott drove the No. 44 Richard Petty Motorsports Ford Fusion in the Monster Energy NASCAR Cup Series before retiring at the end of the season.
- Kyle Benjamin drove the No. 18 Toyota Camry and the No. 20 Toyota Camry for 5 races for Joe Gibbs Racing. Benjamin drove the No. 20 at Richmond in April and Pocono. He drove the No. 18 at both of the Iowa races and Kentucky in September.
- Ben Kennedy drove the No. 2 Chevrolet Camaro for Richard Childress Racing for 9 races beginning with Talladega in May, sharing the ride with Austin Dillon and Paul Menard. On April 17, it was announced that Kennedy would also drive the No. 96 Chevrolet Camaro for GMS Racing for 12 races beginning at Charlotte in May. However, the No. 96 skipped some scheduled races such as Pocono in June, Richmond, Chicagoland, and Dover in September, and Charlotte in October. The reason is mainly they didn't have sponsorship for the race.
- Christopher Bell drove the No. 18 Toyota Camry and the No. 20 Toyota Camry for 7 races for Joe Gibbs Racing. Bell drove the No. 18 at Charlotte in May, and the fall races at Kansas, Texas, and Phoenix. He drove the No. 20 at Iowa in June, Richmond in September, and Homestead in November. On August 5, it was announced that Bell would run another race in the No. 18 at Road America in August. Bell currently competes full-time in the NASCAR Camping World Truck Series, driving the No. 4 Toyota Tundra for Kyle Busch Motorsports.
- Cale Conley returned to NASCAR for one-race deal at Charlotte after almost 3 years absence.
- On June 5, it was announced that after the race at Pocono, the No. 6 Roush Fenway Racing Ford Mustang team would be shut down. Bubba Wallace moved over to the Monster Energy NASCAR Cup Series to drive the No. 43 Richard Petty Motorsports Ford Fusion, filling in for the injured Aric Almirola. Wallace returned to the Xfinity Series in September at Chicagoland, driving the No. 98 Ford Mustang for Biagi-DenBeste Racing.
- Sam Hornish Jr. drove the No. 22 Ford Mustang for Team Penske for 3 races with the possibility of more races being added. Hornish drove the No. 22 at both Iowa races as well as at Mid-Ohio. Hornish had previously competed for Team Penske in the Monster Energy NASCAR Cup Series from 2008–2010 and in the Xfinity Series from 2011–2013. In 2016, Hornish drove part-time in the Xfinity Series driving the No. 18 Toyota Camry for Joe Gibbs Racing and the No. 2 Chevrolet Camaro for Richard Childress Racing. After his win at Mid-Ohio, Hornish returned to No. 22 at Kentucky (fall). Hornish also drove the No. 12 car at Charlotte in the fall, and the No. 22 car at Homestead in November.
- Angela Ruch-Cope returned to NASCAR at Kentucky after almost 5 years hiatus.
- Brett Moffitt drove the No. 96 Chevrolet Camaro for GMS Racing at the July Iowa Race. Moffitt has only 1 Xfinity Start back in 2012 driving the No. 99 Toyota Camry for RAB Racing, finishing 9th in the July Iowa Race. Earlier this season, Moffitt had planned to run the full NASCAR Camping World Truck Series schedule, driving the No. 7 Toyota Tundra for Red Horse Racing, before the team shut down in late May.
- P. J. Jones returned to NASCAR at Watkins Glen. His last race in NASCAR was in 2011. Enrique Baca, Brian Henderson, Devin Jones and Stephen Young all of them made their Xfinity Series debut at Watkins Glen.
- On August 5, it was announced that Regan Smith drove the No. 18 Toyota Camry for Joe Gibbs Racing at the Mid-Ohio Sports Car Course in August. Smith currently competes part-time in the NASCAR Camping World Truck Series, driving the No. 92 Ford F-150 for RBR Racing and also made a few starts in the Monster Energy NASCAR Cup Series, subbing for Aric Almirola in the No. 43 Ford Fusion for Richard Petty Motorsports. In 2016, Smith drove full-time in Cup, driving the No. 7 Chevrolet Camaro for Tommy Baldwin Racing, and also made a few starts in the Xfinity series, driving the No. 88 Chevrolet Camaro for JR Motorsports.
- On August 8, it was announced that Open Wheel and Sports Car driver James Davison, would be driving the No. 20 Joe Gibbs Racing Toyota Camry for 2 races, at Mid-Ohio and Road America. Davison previously made 1 start in the Xfinity series in 2016, driving the No. 90 King Autosport Chevrolet Camaro to a 19th-place finish at Road America. Earlier this year, Davison replaced an injured Sébastien Bourdais in the Indianapolis 500, finishing 20th.
- Matt Bell returned to NASCAR at Mid-Ohio. His last race in NASCAR was in 2012. Earlier this year, he compete in the 24 Hours of Daytona. Sheldon Creed made his Xfinity Series debut at Mid-Ohio.
- On August 19, it was announced that Austin Cindric would be making his NASCAR Xfinity Series debut driving the No. 22 Ford Mustang for Team Penske at Road America. Cindric currently competes full-time in the Camping World Truck Series driving the No. 19 Ford F-150 for Brad Keselowski Racing.
- John Graham returned to NASCAR at Road America. His last race in NASCAR was in 2007.
- On September 25, 2017, JGL Racing announced that they would releasing Dakoda Armstrong and that they would be shutting down the No. 28 Toyota Camry race team immediately due to a lack of funding.

==== Crew chiefs ====
- Matt Beckman served as crew chief of the car driven by Matt Tifft in 2017. Beckman was an engineer of the No. 11 Cup team in 2016.
- Jeff Meendering arrived as crew chief of the No. 00 car driven by Cole Custer in 2017. Meendering was the car chief of the No. 20 car driven by Matt Kenseth for the Cup Series in 2016.
- Matt Swiderski served as crew chief for Ty Dillon in 2017. Swiderski was the head of vehicle development in 2016.
- Scott Graves served as crew chief for Kyle Busch and others in the No. 18 in 2017 as announced January 26. Graves was the No. 19 crew chief for Daniel Suárez in 2016.
- On May 22, it was announced that Justin Alexander, crew chief for the Richard Childress Racing No. 2 team, would be moving up to be the crew chief of the No. 3 team driven by Austin Dillon in the Monster Energy NASCAR Cup Series, replacing former crew chief Slugger Labbe who left the team to pursue other opportunities. Randall Burnett, who previously was the crew chief for A. J. Allmendinger in the Cup Series for JTG Daugherty Racing, replaced Alexander.

==== Manufacturers ====
- B. J. McLeod Motorsports switched from Ford to Chevrolet. Before the race at Talladega, they switched to Toyota for superspeedways races, except for no. 99 for David Starr which he used his Chevrolet.

== Rule changes ==
- On October 26, NASCAR announced that drivers with more than five years of full-time racing on the Cup level may drive a maximum of 10 Xfinity Series races. They are also ineligible to drive in the Xfinity Dash4Cash races as well as the final eight races of the season. Exceptions were given to drivers with more than five years of full-time racing on the Cup level if they declared to run points in Xfinity Series.
- On February 8, 2017, NASCAR announced a new damaged vehicle policy for all three national series. Body panels can no longer be replaced after a wreck, and a team has five minutes on pit road to fix the damage before they are eliminated.
- Like the NASCAR Cup Series, all Xfinity Series races were split into three segments. Top 10 drivers in the first two segments were awarded points. The final stage awarded full points as usual. The first segment finish was about a quarter of the full distance, and the second segment finish was about half of the full distance.
- All races except Indianapolis saw the rear spoiler size significantly reduced to reduce downforce. The Indianapolis race featured a restrictor plate package including front air ducts provided by NASCAR that could not be covered with tape and a return to the 2016 rear spoiler.

== Schedule ==
The initial schedule, comprising 33 races, was released on May 5, 2016. A final schedule with some modifications made in conjunction with broadcast partners Fox and NBC was released on July 27, 2016.

The Fox and NBC broadcast networks aired four races each, where the rest aired on pay channels FS1 and NBCSN.

No	Race title	Track	Location	Date
1	PowerShares QQQ 300	Daytona International Speedway	Daytona Beach, Florida	February 25
2	Rinnai 250	Atlanta Motor Speedway	Hampton, Georgia	March 4
3	Boyd Gaming 300	Las Vegas Motor Speedway	Las Vegas, Nevada	March 11
4	DC Solar 200	Phoenix International Raceway	Avondale, Arizona	March 18
5	Service King 300	Auto Club Speedway	Fontana, California	March 25
6	My Bariatric Solutions 300	Texas Motor Speedway	Fort Worth, Texas	April 8
7	Fitzgerald Glider Kits 300	Bristol Motor Speedway	Bristol, Tennessee	April 22
8	ToyotaCare 250	Richmond International Raceway	Richmond, Virginia	April 29
9	Sparks Energy 300	Talladega Superspeedway	Lincoln, Alabama	May 6
10	Hisense 4K TV 300	Charlotte Motor Speedway	Concord, North Carolina	May 27
11	OneMain Financial 200	Dover International Speedway	Dover, Delaware	June 3
12	Pocono Green 250	Pocono Raceway	Long Pond, Pennsylvania	June 10
13	Irish Hills 250	Michigan International Speedway	Cambridge Township, Michigan	June 17
14	American Ethanol E15 250	Iowa Speedway	Newton, Iowa	June 24
15	Coca-Cola Firecracker 250	Daytona International Speedway	Daytona Beach, Florida	June 30; July 1*
16	Alsco 300	Kentucky Speedway	Sparta, Kentucky	July 8*
17	Overton's 200	New Hampshire Motor Speedway	Loudon, New Hampshire	July 15
18	Lilly Diabetes 250	Indianapolis Motor Speedway	Speedway, Indiana	July 22
19	U.S. Cellular 250	Iowa Speedway	Newton, Iowa	July 29
20	Zippo 200 at The Glen	Watkins Glen International	Watkins Glen, New York	August 5
21	Mid-Ohio Challenge	Mid-Ohio Sports Car Course	Lexington, Ohio	August 12
22	Food City 300	Bristol Motor Speedway	Bristol, Tennessee	August 18
23	Johnsonville 180	Road America	Elkhart Lake, Wisconsin	August 27
24	Sport Clips Haircuts VFW 200	Darlington Raceway	Darlington, South Carolina	September 2
25	Virginia 529 College Savings 250	Richmond Raceway	Richmond, Virginia	September 8
26	TheHouse.com 300	Chicagoland Speedway	Joliet, Illinois	September 16
NASCAR Xfinity Series Playoffs
Round of 12
27	VisitMyrtleBeach.com 300	Kentucky Speedway	Sparta, Kentucky	September 23
28	Use Your Melon Drive Sober 200	Dover International Speedway	Dover, Delaware	September 30
29	Drive for the Cure 300	Charlotte Motor Speedway	Concord, North Carolina	October 7
Round of 8
30	Kansas Lottery 300	Kansas Speedway	Kansas City, Kansas	October 21
31	O'Reilly Auto Parts 300	Texas Motor Speedway	Fort Worth, Texas	November 4
32	Ticket Galaxy 200	Phoenix International Raceway	Avondale, Arizona	November 11
Championship 4
33	Ford EcoBoost 300	Homestead–Miami Speedway	Homestead, Florida	November 18

- The Coca-Cola Firecracker 250 started on June 30 but the rest of the race was postponed to July 1 due to persistent rain.
- The Alsco 300 was postponed from July 7 to July 8 because of inclement weather.

Changes from 2016 include:

- The May Dover race moved to June, after the Charlotte race weekend.
- The June Iowa race moved from a Sunday afternoon to a Saturday night.
- The July Iowa race moved from night to mid-afternoon.
- Road America moved from a Saturday afternoon to a Sunday afternoon.
- The playoff race at Texas Motor Speedway moved from a Saturday afternoon to a Saturday night.
- The playoff race at Phoenix International Raceway moved back to a Saturday afternoon. It was a night race in 2016.
- The October Charlotte race was originally scheduled for Friday night. But on April 20, NASCAR moved the race to Saturday afternoon.

== Results and standings ==
=== Race results ===
No.	Race	Pole position	Most laps led	Winning driver	Manufacturer	No.	Winning team
1	PowerShares QQQ 300	Brandon Jones	Elliott Sadler	Ryan Reed	Ford	16	Roush Fenway Racing
2	Rinnai 250	Kyle Busch	Kevin Harvick	Kyle Busch	Toyota	18	Joe Gibbs Racing
3	Boyd Gaming 300	Kyle Busch	Joey Logano	Joey Logano	Ford	12	Team Penske
4	DC Solar 200	William Byron	Justin Allgaier	Justin Allgaier	Chevrolet	7	JR Motorsports
5	Service King 300	Joey Logano	Joey Logano	Kyle Larson	Chevrolet	42	Chip Ganassi Racing
6	My Bariatric Solutions 300	Joey Logano	Erik Jones	Erik Jones	Toyota	20	Joe Gibbs Racing
7	Fitzgerald Glider Kits 300	Kyle Larson	Kyle Larson	Erik Jones	Toyota	20	Joe Gibbs Racing
8	ToyotaCare 250	Daniel Hemric	Justin Allgaier	Kyle Larson	Chevrolet	42	Chip Ganassi Racing
9	Sparks Energy 300	Blake Koch	Justin Allgaier	Aric Almirola	Ford	98	Biagi-DenBeste Racing
10	Hisense 4K TV 300	Justin Allgaier	Ryan Blaney	Ryan Blaney	Ford	12	Team Penske
11	OneMain Financial 200	Kyle Larson	Kyle Larson	Kyle Larson	Chevrolet	42	Chip Ganassi Racing
12	Pocono Green 250	Kyle Benjamin	Brad Keselowski	Brad Keselowski	Ford	22	Team Penske
13	Irish Hills 250	Kyle Busch	Brad Keselowski	Denny Hamlin	Toyota	20	Joe Gibbs Racing
14	American Ethanol E15 250	Christopher Bell	Christopher Bell	William Byron	Chevrolet	9	JR Motorsports
15	Coca-Cola Firecracker 250	Brennan Poole	William Byron	William Byron	Chevrolet	9	JR Motorsports
16	Alsco 300	Kyle Busch	Erik Jones	Kyle Busch	Toyota	18	Joe Gibbs Racing
17	Overton's 200	Kyle Busch	Brad Keselowski	Kyle Busch	Toyota	18	Joe Gibbs Racing
18	Lilly Diabetes 250	Elliott Sadler	Kyle Busch	William Byron	Chevrolet	9	JR Motorsports
19	U.S. Cellular 250	Ryan Preece	Ryan Preece	Ryan Preece	Toyota	20	Joe Gibbs Racing
20	Zippo 200 at The Glen	Joey Logano	Kyle Busch	Kyle Busch	Toyota	18	Joe Gibbs Racing
21	Mid-Ohio Challenge	Sam Hornish Jr.	Sam Hornish Jr.	Sam Hornish Jr.	Ford	22	Team Penske
22	Food City 300	Kyle Busch	Kyle Busch	Kyle Busch	Toyota	18	Joe Gibbs Racing
23	Johnsonville 180	Austin Cindric	James Davison	Jeremy Clements	Chevrolet	51	Jeremy Clements Racing
24	Sport Clips Haircuts VFW 200	Denny Hamlin	Joey Logano	Denny Hamlin	Toyota	18	Joe Gibbs Racing
25	Virginia 529 College Savings 250	Kyle Busch	Kyle Busch	Brad Keselowski	Ford	22	Team Penske
26	TheHouse.com 300	Erik Jones	Erik Jones	Justin Allgaier	Chevrolet	7	JR Motorsports
NASCAR Xfinity Series Playoffs
Round of 12
27	VisitMyrtleBeach.com 300	Kyle Benjamin	Tyler Reddick	Tyler Reddick	Chevrolet	42	Chip Ganassi Racing
28	Use Your Melon Drive Sober 200	William Byron	Ryan Blaney	Ryan Blaney	Ford	22	Team Penske
29	Drive for the Cure 300	Daniel Suárez	Daniel Suárez	Alex Bowman	Chevrolet	42	Chip Ganassi Racing
Round of 8
30	Kansas Lottery 300	Tyler Reddick	Erik Jones	Christopher Bell	Toyota	18	Joe Gibbs Racing
31	O'Reilly Auto Parts 300	Erik Jones	Erik Jones	Erik Jones	Toyota	20	Joe Gibbs Racing
32	Ticket Galaxy 200	Erik Jones	Ryan Blaney	William Byron	Chevrolet	9	JR Motorsports
Championship 4
33	Ford EcoBoost 300	Tyler Reddick	Cole Custer	Cole Custer	Ford	00	Stewart–Haas Racing

=== Drivers' Championship ===
(key) Bold – Pole position awarded by time. Italics – Pole position set by final practice results or owner's points. * – Most laps led. ^{1} – Stage 1 winner. ^{2} – Stage 2 winner. ^{1–10} – Regular season top 10 finishers.
. – Eliminated after Round of 12 . – Eliminated after Round of 8

Pos	Driver	DAY	ATL	LVS	PHO	CAL	TEX	BRI	RCH	TAL	CLT	DOV	POC	MCH	IOW	DAY	KEN	NHA	IND	IOW	GLN	MOH	BRI	ROA	DAR	RCH	CHI	KEN	DOV	CLT	KAN	TEX	PHO	HOM	Pts.	Stage	Bonus
1	William Byron **(R)**	9	7	14	**4**	5	7^{2}	12	30	36	14	6	12	2	1	1*	7	3	1^{1}	9	10	25	22	6	5	7	33	18	**3**^{1}	16	4	9	1	3	4034	–	26^{3}
2	Elliott Sadler	24^{12}	5	8	5	7	10	4	7	2	35	7	4	3^{2}	8	2^{2}	12	7	**4**^{2}	12	18	6	3	14	33	5	3	6	9	10	7	4	18	8	4029	–	20^{1}
3	Justin Allgaier	30	30	4	1*	9	13	14	2*^{2}	8*^{2}	**12**	11	2	16	9	30	8	32	35	20^{2}	4	31	5	11	8	8	1	3	2	33	5	11	10	12	4025	–	23^{2}
4	Daniel Hemric **(R)**	31	9	13	7	11	32	5^{2}	**3**	38	13	13	9	12	21	32	9	12	8	7	11	2	7	15^{2}	18	4	4	7	4	7	18	14	5	34	4003	–	9^{4}
NASCAR Xfinity Series Playoffs cut-off
Pos	Driver	DAY	ATL	LVS	PHO	CAL	TEX	BRI	RCH	TAL	CLT	DOV	POC	MCH	IOW	DAY	KEN	NHA	IND	IOW	GLN	MOH	BRI	ROA	DAR	RCH	CHI	KEN	DOV	CLT	KAN	TEX	PHO	HOM	Pts.	Stage	Bonus
5	Cole Custer **(R)**	37	10	11	21	35	5	32	13	26	7	4	7	10	24	22	11	9	5	5	12	35	10	8	9	14	7	5^{12}	8	6	19	5	7	1*^{12}	2288	69	7^{6}
6	Brennan Poole	26	11	16	8	8	37	8	22	24	8	12	15	11	27	**7**	21	10	7	4	17	8	6	31	6	10	11	2	5	5	12	7	38	6	2223	31	6^{5}
7	Matt Tifft **(R)**	11	12	34	12	17	9	16	14	6	26	9	10	26	22	18	14	11	11	19	13	3	17	3	40	13	6	9	6	9	8	8	11	7	2211	16	4^{7}
8	Ryan Reed	1	18	9	11	15	11	38	23	29	11	5	14	8	19	31	36	14	6	21	15	33	37	35	15	12	17	10	16	12	10	23	14	20	2161	2	5
9	Michael Annett	14	15	21	9	13	20	10	8	7	36	14	13	37	6	33	16	16	25	33	16	19	12	2	17	15	15	16	11	27	14	12	16	9	2155	–	1^{10}
10	Brendan Gaughan	5	13	35	27	33	19	35	35	30	9	20	6	14	26^{2}	9	39	17	13	13	9	7	30	5	13	21	13	14	10	11	13	17	32	13	2153	1	3^{9}
11	Blake Koch	15	40	12	13	12	16	9	11	**31**	19	32	27	17	25	38^{1}	23	13	17	8	22	11^{1}	14	7	11	11	9	17	19	25	23	13	6	16	2138	3	5^{8}
12	Jeremy Clements	35	37	26	19	22	21	17	15	27	17	23	17	23	7	15	22	21	31	28	35	37	18	1	21	16	20	22	22	20	25	22	23	23	2107	–	5
13	Ross Chastain	16	25	25	22	37	23	31	38	19	15	21	24	19	4	6	20	19	16	18	19	15	15	13	14	28	23	21	12	14	17	19	19	17	595	11	–
14	J. J. Yeley	25	36	22	16	16	22	11	39	11	22	15	19	38	13	13	25	15	15	6	39	13	16	17	19	20	21	19	17	19	20	18	20	22	588	18	–
15	Ryan Sieg	21	22	18	34	21	18	21	26	12	27	16	23	15	2	35	18	20	14	14	27	12	32	20	22	26	24	20	14	18	26	20	21	26	551	15	–
16	Brandon Jones	**29**	14	15	15	32	15	20	33	37	16	29	36	9	23	19	40	34	9	10	14	14	20	25	23	23	12	13	39	13	11	35	15	14	549	26	–
17	Dakoda Armstrong	12	21	20	17	20	17	19	16	23	20	19	20	20	5	3	17	24	20	17	21	10	24	22	29	18	16	23							521	15	–
18	Tyler Reddick	20			14		33			20	10			13	3	27	10		37	36			11		16	17		1*	26		**2**			**4**	484	113	5
19	Spencer Gallagher **(R)**	36	28	23	18	19	14	18	10	39	37	31	18	18	30	24	13	35	28	37	32	36	23	24	34	22	14	15	24	34	21	15	17	19	433	13	–
20	Bubba Wallace	33	6	6	6	6	6	33	6	13	28	8^{2}	11														10								348	39	1
21	Garrett Smithley	8	27	29	24	26	30	34	29	21	24	27	35	29	10	28	26	23	21	35	24	30	34	27	26	32	37	25	29	23	28	24	25	24	348	–	–
22	Joey Gase	7	31	30	35	28	26	28	20	16	23	36	32	25	18	10	33	25	30	24	29	21	27	32	28	36	27	30	28	31	30	27	33	29	336	–	–
23	Ben Kennedy **(R)**									4	25	18	Wth	36	20	16	32	6	18	23		26	19	18	12	Wth	Wth	11	Wth	Wth				18	326	47	–
24	Harrison Rhodes	10	24	27	23	31	35	23	24	22	34	37	37	22	36	36	28	18	22	15	23	Wth	31		24	30	25	24	37	22	24	25	27	39	321	3	–
25	David Starr	40	32	28	32	24	24	36	17	18	31	33	25	21	14	5	31	30	29	26	30	17	40	28	36	35	22	29	38	26	27	31	29	32	315	–	–
26	B. J. McLeod			37	25	23	27	29	37	DNQ	29	22	26	30	17	11	24	26	33	22			26		27		35	28	27	28	32	26		33	247	–	–
27	Ray Black Jr.	18	29	31	29	27	25	37	18	40		24			29	12	27		24	30			21		25				21	21			24	25	245	–	–
28	Casey Mears					14	38		9		21		21			34	15		Wth		25	32		9		25			18				12	11	242	6	–
29	Ryan Preece																	2		**1***^{1}								4						5	202	62	6
30	Dylan Lupton								12			30	22	24	15			22		25	20	27		33	30	24					16	21			197	–	–
31	Sam Hornish Jr.														37					34		**1***^{2}						31		2				2	169	56	6
32	Timmy Hill		33	33	26	30	31	24	28	17	38	39	30	39	28	17	38	28	36		37		36	Wth	32	38	36	36	33	35	36	30	28	37	158	–	–
33	Kyle Benjamin								32				**16**		31					2								**12**							152	60	–
34	Scott Lagasse Jr.	6								34					32	14						22		23										21	117	10	–
35	Mike Harmon	DNQ	DNQ	DNQ	31	34	DNQ	30	36	25		25	34	32	35	23	35	31	34	31			35		35	33	32	34	31	32	DNQ	32	39		115	–	–
36	Brandon Brown		23						25			17		33		37	DNQ			29			25		20	27			25						110	–	–
37	Jeff Green	39	26	36		29	36	25	40	10	DNQ	40	40	35	40	20	37	38	40	40	38	39	39	40	39	40	39	40	40	40	40	37	37	40	102	–	–
38	Jeb Burton						29	26								4	19		19				29												99	3	–
39	Tommy Joe Martins							Wth	DNQ				29	28	11			29	26	27			33		31	29									90	–	–
40	Mario Gosselin	17			28														27								31			24	29	28	26		90	4	–
41	Quin Houff							15	27						12		DNQ											27			22			DNQ	82	–	–
42	Justin Marks																					9		4											75	14	–
43	Brian Scott																			3								8							70	7	–
44	Josh Bilicki			DNQ	Wth	Wth								27							28	29		12			34		30						63	1	–
45	Ty Majeski														34					16														10	61	10	–
46	Josh Williams							22					28	34		40												26				34		28	53	2	–
47	James Davison																					4		37*^{1}											52	18	1
48	Spencer Boyd												33					27								31	28				33	29			41	–	–
49	Chad Finchum											34					29		32				28						36	29				30	41	–	–
50	Andy Lally																					5													38	6	–
51	Anthony Kumpen	22																				16													36	–	–
52	Drew Herring			19	20																														35	–	–
53	Chris Cockrum	28	34							33						26											30								34	–	–
54	Brandon Hightower	13		38		38																													26	–	–
55	Martin Roy			32		25				32								33																	26	–	–
56	Morgan Shepherd	DNQ	DNQ	DNQ	36		Wth	39	DNQ	35		38	38	40	39	Wth	DNQ	37	39	38	Wth	40	DNQ		37	DNQ	38	37	32	38	37	39	34	DNQ	26	–	–
57	Enrique Baca																				31	18													25	–	–
58	Corey LaJoie		16^{†}			18^{†}										Wth											Wth		15^{†}	17^{†}			22^{†}	15	23	1	–
59	Carl Long		DNQ		38		39	27	34		39		39		38			36							38			39					36		22	–	–
60	Tim Cowen																					20		36											18	–	–
61	Stephen Young																				36	24		34											17	–	–
62	Mark Thompson	DNQ								28						29																			17	–	–
63	Ryan Ellis																							21											16	–	–
64	Dexter Bean														33									26				38		DNQ					16	–	–
65	John Graham																							30		37							31	38	15	–	–
66	Angela Ruch																30											32		36		38			14	–	–
67	Alex Labbé						28				33																								13	–	–
68	Caesar Bacarella																																30	31	13	–	–
69	Devin Jones																				26														11	–	–
70	Benny Gordon	27																																	10	–	–
71	Bobby Dale Earnhardt																			DNQ						34					31				9	–	–
72	Nicolas Hammann																							29											8	–	–
73	Vinnie Miller																										29								8	–	–
74	Todd Bodine										30																								7	–	–
75	Cale Conley										32																								5	–	–
76	Stan Mullis																			32															5	–	–
77	Sheldon Creed																					34		38											5	1	–
78	Brian Henderson																				33														4	–	–
79	John Jackson					Wth												40										35				40		Wth	4	–	–
80	Josh Berry																														34				3	–	–
81	Clint King	38	35																																3	–	–
82	Stephen Leicht	DNQ	38^{†}	39^{†}	37^{†}	39^{†}	DNQ	Wth			40^{†}																							35	2	–	–
83	Matt Bell																					38													1	–	–
84	Ernie Francis Jr.																							39											1	–	–
	P. J. Jones																				DNQ														0	–	–
	Gregory Vandersluis																							Wth											0	–	–
Ineligible for Xfinity Series driver points
Pos.	Driver	DAY	ATL	LVS	PHO	CAL	TEX	BRI	RCH	TAL	CLT	DOV	POC	MCH	IOW	DAY	KEN	NHA	IND	IOW	GLN	MOH	BRI	ROA	DAR	RCH	CHI	KEN	DOV	CLT	KAN	TEX	PHO	HOM	Pts.	Stage	Bonus
	Kyle Busch		**1**	**7**^{1}		3^{12}								**5**			**1**	**1**	12*		1*		**1***^{12}			**2***											
	Kyle Larson		3	2		1		**7***^{1}	1			**1***^{1}	3					4^{1}			40						2					3					
	Erik Jones	32			3^{1}	4	1*^{1}	1		5		35				25	3*^{1}		23		8				4		**18***^{12}		20	30^{1}	15*^{12}	**1***^{12}	**3**				
	Ryan Blaney				2^{2}		2	2	5		1*^{2}	2					2^{2}										26		1*^{2}	3	3	2	2*^{12}				
	Brad Keselowski	4	2^{1}	10^{2}							6		1*^{12}	4*^{1}				5*^{2}			3^{1}					1^{2}											
	Joey Logano			1*		**2***	**34**			3						8	6		3		**2**		9		2*												
	Christopher Bell										4				**16***^{1}									19		6					1	6	4	36			
	Alex Bowman																													1			8				
	Aric Almirola	23	19	17						1^{1}													38														
	Daniel Suárez	34		3	39		12	3	21	9		3	5			39							2				19		7	8*^{2}							
	Kevin Harvick		4*^{2}				3				2^{1}						4				6				3^{12}												
	Paul Menard					36							31	7			34		2		5^{2}					19											
	Kasey Kahne	2								15																											
	Austin Dillon	3	8	5	33		4	13	4^{1}		3	28											8		10		5		23	4	6	10	9				
	Ty Dillon	19	17	24	10	10	8	6	19	14	18	10	8	6		21	5	8	10		7		4		7	3^{1}	8		13	15	9	16	13				
	Denny Hamlin		20								5			1^{‡}											**1**^{‡}												
	Dale Earnhardt Jr.																						13			9											
	Parker Kligerman																							10													
	Brett Moffitt																			11																	
	Austin Cindric																							16										Wth			
	Cody Ware																				34	23															
	Jordan Anderson		39	40	40	40	40	40		Wth	DNQ	26																									
	Joe Nemechek																																35	27			
	Regan Smith																					28															
	Matt Mills				30				31																		40							DNQ			
	Korbin Forrister													31														33									
	Gray Gaulding																												34	39	39	33	40				
	Reed Sorenson																	39	38	39			DNQ		DNQ	39			35	37	38	36					
	Jennifer Jo Cobb																														35						
Pos.	Driver	DAY	ATL	LVS	PHO	CAL	TEX	BRI	RCH	TAL	CLT	DOV	POC	MCH	IOW	DAY	KEN	NHA	IND	IOW	GLN	MOH	BRI	ROA	DAR	RCH	CHI	KEN	DOV	CLT	KAN	TEX	PHO	HOM	Pts.	Stage	Bonus
^{†} – Corey LaJoie and Stephen Leicht started receiving Xfinity Series points at Homestead.^{‡} – Both Denny Hamlin's wins were encumbered so his best finish (excluding his two wins) was 5th so for that reason he is scored behind Ty Dillon in the championship. For purposes of the owners championship, both Hamlin wins were penalized with points penalties.

=== Owners' championship (Top 15) ===
(key) Bold - Pole position awarded by time. Italics - Pole position set by final practice results or rainout. * – Most laps led. ^{1} – Stage 1 winner. ^{2} – Stage 2 winner. ^{1–10} – Owners' regular season top 10 finishers.
. – Eliminated after Round of 12 . – Eliminated after Round of 8

Pos.	No.	Car Owner	DAY	ATL	LVS	PHO	CAL	TEX	BRI	RCH	TAL	CLT	DOV	POC	MCH	IOW	DAY	KEN	NHA	IND	IOW	GLN	MOH	BRI	ROA	DAR	RCH	CHI	KEN	DOV	CLT	KAN	TEX	PHO	HOM	Points	Bonus
1	22	Roger Penske	4	2^{1}	10^{2}	2^{2}	**2***	2	2	5	3	6	2	1*^{12}	4*^{1}	37	8	6	5*^{2}	3	34	3^{1}	**1***^{2}	9	16	2*	1^{2}	26	31	1*^{2}	3	3	2	2*^{12}	2	4035	43^{1}
2	9	Rick Hendrick	9	7	14	**4**	5	7^{2}	12	30	36	14	6	12	2	1	1*	7	3	1^{1}	9	10	25	22	6	5	7	33	18	**3**^{1}	16	4	9	1	3	4034	27^{7}
3	18	J. D. Gibbs	34	**1**	**7**^{1}	39	3^{12}	12	3	21	9	4	3	5	**5**	31	39	**1**	**1**	12*	2	1*	28	**1***^{12}	19	**1**	**2***	19	**12**	7	8*^{2}	1	6	4	5	4032	42^{4}
4	20	Joe Gibbs	32	20	3	3^{1}	4	1*^{1}	1	32	5	5	35	**16**	1	**16***^{1}	25	3*^{1}	2	23	**1***^{1}	8	4	2	37*^{1}	4	6	**18***^{12}	4	20	30^{1}	15*^{12}	**1***^{12}	**3**	36	4001	42^{2}
NASCAR Xfinity Series Playoffs cut-off
5	42	Chip Ganassi	20	3	2	14	1	33	**7***^{1}	1	20	10	**1***^{1}	3	6	3	27	10	4^{1}	37	36	40	9	11	4	16	17	2	1*	26	1	**2**	3	8	**4**	2351	33^{5}
6	1	Dale Earnhardt Jr.	24^{12}	5	8	5	7	10	4	7	2	35	7	4	3^{2}	8	2^{2}	12	7	**4**^{2}	12	18	6	3	14	33	5	3	6	9	10	7	4	18	8	2255	13^{3}
7	7	Kelley Earnhardt Miller	30	30	4	1*	9	13	14	2*^{2}	8*^{2}	**12**	11	2	16	9	30	8	32	35	20^{2}	4	31	5	11	8	8	1	3	2	33	5	11	10	12	2241	17^{6}
8	21	Richard Childress	31	9	13	7	11	32	5^{2}	**3**	38	13	13	9	12	21	32	9	12	8	7	11	2	7	15^{2}	18	4	4	7	4	7	18	14	5	34	2231	3^{10}
9	48	Chip Ganassi	26	11	16	8	8	37	8	22	24	8	12	15	11	27	**7**	21	10	7	4	17	8	6	31	6	10	11	2	5	5	11	7	38	6	2217	–
10	2	Richard Childress	3	8	5	33	36	4	13	4^{1}	4	3	28	31	7	20	16	34	6	2	23	5^{2}	26	8	18	10	19	5	11	23	4	6	10	9	18	2193	5^{8}
11	3	Richard Childress	19	17	24	10	10	8	6	19	14	18	10	8	6	32	21	5	8	10	3	7	22	4	23	7	3^{1}	8	8	13	15	9	16	13	21	2182	3^{9}
12	16	Jack Roush	1	18	9	11	15	11	38	23	29	11	5	14	8	19	31	36	14	6	21	15	33	37	35	15	12	17	10	16	12	10	23	14	20	2161	5
13	00	Gene Haas	37	10	11	21	35	5	32	13	26	7	4	7	10	24	22	11	9	5	5	12	35	10	8	9	14	7	5^{12}	8	6	19	5	7	1*^{12}	945	9
14	19	Joe Gibbs	11	12	34	12	17	9	16	14	6	26	9	10	26	22	18	14	11	11	19	13	3	17	3	40	13	6	9	6	9	8	8	11	7	824	–
15	11	Matt Kaulig	15	40	12	13	12	16	9	11	**31**	19	32	27	17	25	38^{1}	23	13	17	8	22	11^{1}	14	7	11	11	9	17	19	25	23	13	6	16	698	2
Pos.	No.	Car Owner	DAY	ATL	LVS	PHO	CAL	TEX	BRI	RCH	TAL	CLT	DOV	POC	MCH	IOW	DAY	KEN	NHA	IND	IOW	GLN	MOH	BRI	ROA	DAR	RCH	CHI	KEN	DOV	CLT	KAN	TEX	PHO	HOM	Points	Bonus

=== Manufacturers' Championship ===
Pos	Manufacturer	Wins	Points
1	Chevrolet	12	1195
2	Ford	9	1132
3	Toyota	12	1129
4	Dodge	0	190

== See also ==
- 2017 Monster Energy NASCAR Cup Series
- 2017 NASCAR Camping World Truck Series
- 2017 NASCAR K&N Pro Series East
- 2017 NASCAR K&N Pro Series West
- 2017 NASCAR Whelen Modified Tour
- 2017 NASCAR Pinty's Series
- 2017 NASCAR PEAK Mexico Series
- 2017 NASCAR Whelen Euro Series
