= 2017 TheHouse.com 300 =

26th race of the 2017 NASCAR Xfinity Series

Race details
- Race 26 of 33 in the 2017 NASCAR Xfinity Series
- Date: September 16, 2017
- Official name: 17th Annual TheHouse.com 300
- Location: Joliet, Illinois, Chicagoland Speedway
- Course: Permanent racing facility
- Course length: 1.5 miles (2.41 km)
- Distance: 200 laps, 300 mi (482.803 km)
- Scheduled distance: 200 laps, 300 mi (482.803 km)
- Average speed: 133.218 miles per hour (214.394 km/h)

Pole position
| Driver | Erik Jones | Joe Gibbs Racing |
- Time: 30.469

Most laps led
| Driver | Erik Jones | Joe Gibbs Racing |
- Laps: 94

Winner
| No. 7 | Justin Allgaier | JR Motorsports |

Television in the United States
- Network: NBCSN
- Announcers: Rick Allen, Jeff Burton, Steve Letarte

Radio in the United States
- Radio: Motor Racing Network

The 2017 TheHouse.com 300 was the 26th stock car race of the 2017 NASCAR Xfinity Series season, the final race of the regular season, and the 17th iteration of the event. The race was held on Saturday, September 16, 2017, in Joliet, Illinois, at Chicagoland Speedway, a 1.5 miles (2.41 km) tri-oval speedway. The race took the scheduled 200 laps to complete. At race's end, Justin Allgaier, driving for JR Motorsports, would manage to pull away from the field on the final restart with seven to go to win his fifth career NASCAR Xfinity Series victory and his second and final win of the season. To fill out the podium, Kyle Larson, driving for Chip Ganassi Racing, and Elliott Sadler, driving for JR Motorsports, would finish second and third, respectively.

The twelve drivers to qualify for the 2017 NASCAR Xfinity Series Chase field were William Byron, Justin Allgaier, Elliott Sadler, Daniel Hemric, Brennan Poole, Ryan Reed, Jeremy Clements, Cole Custer, Blake Koch, Matt Tifft, Brendan Gaughan, and Michael Annett.

== Entry list ==
- (R) denotes rookie driver.
- (i) denotes driver who is ineligible for series driver points.

| # | Driver | Team | Make |
|---|---|---|---|
| 0 | Vinnie Miller | JD Motorsports | Chevrolet |
| 00 | Cole Custer (R) | Stewart–Haas Racing | Ford |
| 1 | Elliott Sadler | JR Motorsports | Chevrolet |
| 01 | Harrison Rhodes | JD Motorsports | Chevrolet |
| 2 | Austin Dillon (i) | Richard Childress Racing | Chevrolet |
| 3 | Ty Dillon (i) | Richard Childress Racing | Chevrolet |
| 4 | Ross Chastain | JD Motorsports | Chevrolet |
| 5 | Michael Annett | JR Motorsports | Chevrolet |
| 7 | Justin Allgaier | JR Motorsports | Chevrolet |
| 07 | Spencer Boyd | SS-Green Light Racing | Chevrolet |
| 8 | B. J. McLeod | B. J. McLeod Motorsports | Chevrolet |
| 9 | William Byron (R) | JR Motorsports | Chevrolet |
| 11 | Blake Koch | Kaulig Racing | Chevrolet |
| 13 | Timmy Hill | MBM Motorsports | Dodge |
| 14 | J. J. Yeley | TriStar Motorsports | Toyota |
| 15 | Matt Mills (i) | JD Motorsports | Chevrolet |
| 16 | Ryan Reed | Roush Fenway Racing | Ford |
| 18 | Daniel Suárez (i) | Joe Gibbs Racing | Toyota |
| 19 | Matt Tifft (R) | Joe Gibbs Racing | Toyota |
| 20 | Erik Jones (i) | Joe Gibbs Racing | Toyota |
| 21 | Daniel Hemric (R) | Richard Childress Racing | Chevrolet |
| 22 | Ryan Blaney (i) | Team Penske | Ford |
| 23 | Spencer Gallagher (R) | GMS Racing | Chevrolet |
| 25 | Chris Cockrum | Chris Cockrum Racing | Chevrolet |
| 28 | Dakoda Armstrong | JGL Racing | Toyota |
| 33 | Brandon Jones | Richard Childress Racing | Chevrolet |
| 39 | Ryan Sieg | RSS Racing | Chevrolet |
| 40 | Garrett Smithley | MBM Motorsports | Toyota |
| 42 | Kyle Larson (i) | Chip Ganassi Racing | Chevrolet |
| 48 | Brennan Poole | Chip Ganassi Racing | Chevrolet |
| 51 | Jeremy Clements | Jeremy Clements Racing | Chevrolet |
| 52 | Joey Gase | Jimmy Means Racing | Chevrolet |
| 62 | Brendan Gaughan | Richard Childress Racing | Chevrolet |
| 74 | Mike Harmon | Mike Harmon Racing | Dodge |
| 78 | Josh Bilicki | B. J. McLeod Motorsports | Chevrolet |
| 89 | Morgan Shepherd | Shepherd Racing Ventures | Chevrolet |
| 90 | Mario Gosselin | King Autosport | Chevrolet |
| 93 | Jeff Green | RSS Racing | Chevrolet |
| 98 | Bubba Wallace | Biagi-DenBeste Racing | Ford |
| 99 | David Starr | BJMM with SS-Green Light Racing | Chevrolet |
Official entry list

== Practice ==
=== First practice ===
The first practice session was held on Friday, September 15, at 1:00 PM CST. The session would last for 55 minutes. Brandon Jones, driving for Richard Childress Racing, would set the fastest time in the session, with a lap of 30.961 and an average speed of 174.413 mph (280.691 km/h).

| Pos | # | Driver | Team | Make | Time | Speed |
|---|---|---|---|---|---|---|
| 1 | 33 | Brandon Jones | Richard Childress Racing | Chevrolet | 30.961 | 174.413 |
| 2 | 20 | Erik Jones (i) | Joe Gibbs Racing | Toyota | 31.099 | 173.639 |
| 3 | 19 | Matt Tifft (R) | Joe Gibbs Racing | Toyota | 31.128 | 173.477 |
First practice results

=== Final practice ===
The final practice session was held on Friday, September 15, at 3:00 PM CST. The session would last for 50 minutes. Erik Jones, driving for Joe Gibbs Racing, would set the fastest time in the session, with a lap of 31.158 and an average speed of 173.310 mph (278.915 km/h).

| Pos | # | Driver | Team | Make | Time | Speed |
|---|---|---|---|---|---|---|
| 1 | 20 | Erik Jones (i) | Joe Gibbs Racing | Toyota | 31.158 | 173.310 |
| 2 | 23 | Spencer Gallagher (R) | GMS Racing | Chevrolet | 31.326 | 172.381 |
| 3 | 18 | Daniel Suárez (i) | Joe Gibbs Racing | Toyota | 31.337 | 172.320 |
Final practice results

== Qualifying ==
Qualifying was held on Saturday, September 16, at 11:35 AM CST. Since Chicagoland Speedway is under 2 miles (3.2 km) in length, the qualifying system was a multi-car system that included three rounds. The first round was 15 minutes, where every driver would be able to set a lap within the 15 minutes. Then, the second round would consist of the fastest 24 cars in Round 1, and drivers would have 10 minutes to set a lap. Round 3 consisted of the fastest 12 drivers from Round 2, and the drivers would have 5 minutes to set a time. Whoever was fastest in Round 3 would win the pole.

Erik Jones, driving for Joe Gibbs Racing, would win the pole after setting a time of 30.469 and an average speed of 177.229 mph (285.222 km/h) in the third round.

No drivers would fail to qualify.

=== Full qualifying results ===
| Pos | # | Driver | Team | Make | Time (R1) | Speed (R1) | Time (R2) | Speed (R2) | Time (R3) | Speed (R3) |
|---|---|---|---|---|---|---|---|---|---|---|
| 1 | 20 | Erik Jones (i) | Joe Gibbs Racing | Toyota | 30.595 | 176.499 | 30.397 | 177.649 | 30.469 | 177.229 |
| 2 | 18 | Daniel Suárez (i) | Joe Gibbs Racing | Toyota | 30.778 | 175.450 | 30.553 | 176.742 | 30.512 | 176.980 |
| 3 | 42 | Kyle Larson (i) | Chip Ganassi Racing | Chevrolet | 30.594 | 176.505 | 30.434 | 177.433 | 30.543 | 176.800 |
| 4 | 22 | Ryan Blaney (i) | Team Penske | Ford | 30.760 | 175.553 | 30.600 | 176.471 | 30.556 | 176.725 |
| 5 | 00 | Cole Custer (R) | Stewart–Haas Racing | Ford | 30.743 | 175.650 | 30.575 | 176.615 | 30.595 | 176.499 |
| 6 | 1 | Elliott Sadler | JR Motorsports | Chevrolet | 30.794 | 175.359 | 30.801 | 175.319 | 30.758 | 175.564 |
| 7 | 19 | Matt Tifft (R) | Joe Gibbs Racing | Toyota | 30.882 | 174.859 | 30.681 | 176.005 | 30.829 | 175.160 |
| 8 | 9 | William Byron (R) | JR Motorsports | Chevrolet | 31.094 | 173.667 | 30.710 | 175.838 | 30.835 | 175.126 |
| 9 | 21 | Daniel Hemric (R) | Richard Childress Racing | Chevrolet | 30.936 | 174.554 | 30.746 | 175.633 | 30.856 | 175.006 |
| 10 | 16 | Ryan Reed | Roush Fenway Racing | Ford | 31.305 | 172.496 | 30.837 | 175.114 | 30.959 | 174.424 |
| 11 | 11 | Blake Koch | Kaulig Racing | Chevrolet | 30.979 | 174.312 | 30.789 | 175.387 | 31.038 | 173.980 |
| 12 | 48 | Brennan Poole | Chip Ganassi Racing | Chevrolet | 31.108 | 173.589 | 30.720 | 175.781 | 31.086 | 173.712 |
Eliminated in Round 2
| 13 | 2 | Austin Dillon (i) | Richard Childress Racing | Chevrolet | 31.194 | 173.110 | 30.847 | 175.058 | - | - |
| 14 | 7 | Justin Allgaier | JR Motorsports | Chevrolet | 30.985 | 174.278 | 30.878 | 174.882 | - | - |
| 15 | 33 | Brandon Jones | Richard Childress Racing | Chevrolet | 31.583 | 170.978 | 30.936 | 174.554 | - | - |
| 16 | 98 | Bubba Wallace | Biagi-DenBeste Racing | Ford | 31.155 | 173.327 | 30.944 | 174.509 | - | - |
| 17 | 3 | Ty Dillon (i) | Richard Childress Racing | Chevrolet | 31.060 | 173.857 | 30.968 | 174.374 | - | - |
| 18 | 5 | Michael Annett | JR Motorsports | Chevrolet | 31.046 | 173.935 | 31.090 | 173.689 | - | - |
| 19 | 62 | Brendan Gaughan | Richard Childress Racing | Chevrolet | 31.122 | 173.511 | 31.154 | 173.332 | - | - |
| 20 | 28 | Dakoda Armstrong | JGL Racing | Toyota | 31.616 | 170.800 | 31.169 | 173.249 | - | - |
| 21 | 4 | Ross Chastain | JD Motorsports | Chevrolet | 31.428 | 171.821 | 31.220 | 172.966 | - | - |
| 22 | 39 | Ryan Sieg | RSS Racing | Chevrolet | 31.258 | 172.756 | 31.464 | 171.625 | - | - |
| 23 | 51 | Jeremy Clements | Jeremy Clements Racing | Chevrolet | 31.601 | 170.881 | 31.527 | 171.282 | - | - |
| 24 | 23 | Spencer Gallagher (R) | GMS Racing | Chevrolet | 31.278 | 172.645 | - | - | - | - |
Eliminated in Round 1
| 25 | 14 | J. J. Yeley | TriStar Motorsports | Toyota | 31.754 | 170.057 | - | - | - | - |
| 26 | 8 | B. J. McLeod | B. J. McLeod Motorsports | Chevrolet | 31.826 | 169.673 | - | - | - | - |
| 27 | 01 | Harrison Rhodes | JD Motorsports | Chevrolet | 31.892 | 169.321 | - | - | - | - |
| 28 | 13 | Timmy Hill | MBM Motorsports | Dodge | 32.158 | 167.921 | - | - | - | - |
| 29 | 52 | Joey Gase | Jimmy Means Racing | Chevrolet | 32.159 | 167.916 | - | - | - | - |
| 30 | 78 | Josh Bilicki | B. J. McLeod Motorsports | Chevrolet | 32.222 | 167.587 | - | - | - | - |
| 31 | 0 | Vinnie Miller | JD Motorsports | Chevrolet | 32.234 | 167.525 | - | - | - | - |
| 32 | 90 | Mario Gosselin | King Autosport | Chevrolet | 32.244 | 167.473 | - | - | - | - |
| 33 | 40 | Garrett Smithley | MBM Motorsports | Toyota | 32.292 | 167.224 | - | - | - | - |
Qualified by owner's points
| 34 | 99 | David Starr | BJMM with SS-Green Light Racing | Chevrolet | 32.363 | 166.857 | - | - | - | - |
| 35 | 25 | Chris Cockrum | Chris Cockrum Racing | Chevrolet | 32.533 | 165.985 | - | - | - | - |
| 36 | 93 | Jeff Green | RSS Racing | Chevrolet | 32.700 | 165.138 | - | - | - | - |
| 37 | 07 | Spencer Boyd | SS-Green Light Racing | Chevrolet | 33.017 | 163.552 | - | - | - | - |
| 38 | 89 | Morgan Shepherd | Shepherd Racing Ventures | Chevrolet | 33.142 | 162.935 | - | - | - | - |
| 39 | 74 | Mike Harmon | Mike Harmon Racing | Dodge | 33.178 | 162.758 | - | - | - | - |
| 40 | 15 | Matt Mills (i) | JD Motorsports | Chevrolet | 35.479 | 152.203 | - | - | - | - |
Official qualifying results
Official starting lineup

== Race results ==
Stage 1 Laps: 45

| Pos | # | Driver | Team | Make | Pts |
|---|---|---|---|---|---|
| 1 | 20 | Erik Jones (i) | Joe Gibbs Racing | Toyota | 0 |
| 2 | 42 | Kyle Larson (i) | Chip Ganassi Racing | Chevrolet | 0 |
| 3 | 00 | Cole Custer (R) | Stewart–Haas Racing | Ford | 8 |
| 4 | 22 | Ryan Blaney (i) | Team Penske | Ford | 0 |
| 5 | 18 | Daniel Suárez (i) | Joe Gibbs Racing | Toyota | 0 |
| 6 | 1 | Elliott Sadler | JR Motorsports | Chevrolet | 5 |
| 7 | 7 | Justin Allgaier | JR Motorsports | Chevrolet | 4 |
| 8 | 19 | Matt Tifft (R) | Joe Gibbs Racing | Toyota | 3 |
| 9 | 2 | Austin Dillon (i) | Richard Childress Racing | Chevrolet | 0 |
| 10 | 21 | Daniel Hemric (R) | Richard Childress Racing | Chevrolet | 1 |

Stage 2 Laps: 45

| Pos | # | Driver | Team | Make | Pts |
|---|---|---|---|---|---|
| 1 | 20 | Erik Jones (i) | Joe Gibbs Racing | Toyota | 0 |
| 2 | 00 | Cole Custer (R) | Stewart–Haas Racing | Ford | 9 |
| 3 | 22 | Ryan Blaney (i) | Team Penske | Ford | 0 |
| 4 | 42 | Kyle Larson (i) | Chip Ganassi Racing | Chevrolet | 0 |
| 5 | 1 | Elliott Sadler | JR Motorsports | Chevrolet | 6 |
| 6 | 18 | Daniel Suárez (i) | Joe Gibbs Racing | Toyota | 0 |
| 7 | 2 | Austin Dillon (i) | Richard Childress Racing | Chevrolet | 0 |
| 8 | 7 | Justin Allgaier | JR Motorsports | Chevrolet | 3 |
| 9 | 3 | Ty Dillon (i) | Richard Childress Racing | Chevrolet | 0 |
| 10 | 19 | Matt Tifft (R) | Joe Gibbs Racing | Toyota | 1 |

Stage 3 Laps: 110

| Pos | # | Driver | Team | Make | Laps | Led | Status | Pts |
|---|---|---|---|---|---|---|---|---|
| 1 | 7 | Justin Allgaier | JR Motorsports | Chevrolet | 200 | 15 | running | 47 |
| 2 | 42 | Kyle Larson (i) | Chip Ganassi Racing | Chevrolet | 200 | 22 | running | 0 |
| 3 | 1 | Elliott Sadler | JR Motorsports | Chevrolet | 200 | 0 | running | 45 |
| 4 | 21 | Daniel Hemric (R) | Richard Childress Racing | Chevrolet | 200 | 0 | running | 34 |
| 5 | 2 | Austin Dillon (i) | Richard Childress Racing | Chevrolet | 200 | 0 | running | 0 |
| 6 | 19 | Matt Tifft (R) | Joe Gibbs Racing | Toyota | 200 | 0 | running | 35 |
| 7 | 00 | Cole Custer (R) | Stewart–Haas Racing | Ford | 200 | 41 | running | 47 |
| 8 | 3 | Ty Dillon (i) | Richard Childress Racing | Chevrolet | 200 | 0 | running | 0 |
| 9 | 11 | Blake Koch | Kaulig Racing | Chevrolet | 200 | 0 | running | 28 |
| 10 | 98 | Bubba Wallace | Biagi-DenBeste Racing | Ford | 200 | 0 | running | 27 |
| 11 | 48 | Brennan Poole | Chip Ganassi Racing | Chevrolet | 200 | 0 | running | 26 |
| 12 | 33 | Brandon Jones | Richard Childress Racing | Chevrolet | 200 | 0 | running | 25 |
| 13 | 62 | Brendan Gaughan | Richard Childress Racing | Chevrolet | 200 | 0 | running | 24 |
| 14 | 23 | Spencer Gallagher (R) | GMS Racing | Chevrolet | 200 | 0 | running | 23 |
| 15 | 5 | Michael Annett | JR Motorsports | Chevrolet | 200 | 0 | running | 22 |
| 16 | 28 | Dakoda Armstrong | JGL Racing | Toyota | 200 | 0 | running | 21 |
| 17 | 16 | Ryan Reed | Roush Fenway Racing | Ford | 200 | 0 | running | 20 |
| 18 | 20 | Erik Jones (i) | Joe Gibbs Racing | Toyota | 200 | 94 | running | 0 |
| 19 | 18 | Daniel Suárez (i) | Joe Gibbs Racing | Toyota | 199 | 0 | running | 0 |
| 20 | 51 | Jeremy Clements | Jeremy Clements Racing | Chevrolet | 199 | 0 | running | 17 |
| 21 | 14 | J. J. Yeley | TriStar Motorsports | Toyota | 198 | 0 | running | 16 |
| 22 | 99 | David Starr | BJMM with SS-Green Light Racing | Chevrolet | 197 | 0 | running | 15 |
| 23 | 4 | Ross Chastain | JD Motorsports | Chevrolet | 196 | 0 | running | 14 |
| 24 | 39 | Ryan Sieg | RSS Racing | Chevrolet | 196 | 0 | running | 13 |
| 25 | 01 | Harrison Rhodes | JD Motorsports | Chevrolet | 196 | 0 | running | 12 |
| 26 | 22 | Ryan Blaney (i) | Team Penske | Ford | 196 | 28 | running | 0 |
| 27 | 52 | Joey Gase | Jimmy Means Racing | Chevrolet | 196 | 0 | running | 10 |
| 28 | 07 | Spencer Boyd | SS-Green Light Racing | Chevrolet | 194 | 0 | running | 9 |
| 29 | 0 | Vinnie Miller | JD Motorsports | Chevrolet | 193 | 0 | running | 8 |
| 30 | 25 | Chris Cockrum | Chris Cockrum Racing | Chevrolet | 193 | 0 | running | 7 |
| 31 | 90 | Mario Gosselin | King Autosport | Chevrolet | 184 | 0 | running | 6 |
| 32 | 74 | Mike Harmon | Mike Harmon Racing | Dodge | 184 | 0 | running | 5 |
| 33 | 9 | William Byron (R) | JR Motorsports | Chevrolet | 166 | 0 | transmission | 4 |
| 34 | 78 | Josh Bilicki | B. J. McLeod Motorsports | Chevrolet | 152 | 0 | electrical | 3 |
| 35 | 8 | B. J. McLeod | B. J. McLeod Motorsports | Chevrolet | 86 | 0 | engine | 2 |
| 36 | 13 | Timmy Hill | MBM Motorsports | Dodge | 33 | 0 | vibration | 1 |
| 37 | 40 | Garrett Smithley | MBM Motorsports | Toyota | 24 | 0 | engine | 1 |
| 38 | 89 | Morgan Shepherd | Shepherd Racing Ventures | Chevrolet | 23 | 0 | handling | 1 |
| 39 | 93 | Jeff Green | RSS Racing | Chevrolet | 8 | 0 | brakes | 1 |
| 40 | 15 | Matt Mills (i) | JD Motorsports | Chevrolet | 3 | 0 | vibration | 0 |
Official race results

== Standings after the race ==
Drivers' Championship standings

| | Pos | Driver | Points |
|---|---|---|---|
| 1 | 1 | William Byron | 2,025 |
| 1 | 2 | Justin Allgaier | 2,023 (-2) |
| 1 | 3 | Elliott Sadler | 2,020 (–5) |
| | 4 | Daniel Hemric | 2,009 (–16) |
| | 5 | Brennan Poole | 2,006 (–19) |
| 3 | 6 | Ryan Reed | 2,005 (-20) |
| 10 | 7 | Jeremy Clements | 2,005 (-20) |
| 2 | 8 | Cole Custer | 2,005 (-20) |
| 1 | 9 | Blake Koch | 2,005 (-20) |
| 3 | 10 | Matt Tifft | 2,004 (-21) |
| | 11 | Brendan Gaughan | 2,003 (-22) |
| 2 | 12 | Michael Annett | 2,001 (-24) |
Official driver's standings

- Note: Only the first 12 positions are included for the driver standings.

| Previous race: 2017 Virginia 529 College Savings 250 | NASCAR Xfinity Series; 2017 season | Next race: 2017 VisitMyrtleBeach.com 300 |
