= 2017 VisitMyrtleBeach.com 300 =

27th race of the 2017 NASCAR Xfinity Series

Race details
- Race 27 of 33 in the 2017 NASCAR Xfinity Series
- Date: September 23, 2017
- Official name: 6th Annual VisitMyrtleBeach.com 300
- Location: Sparta, Kentucky, Kentucky Speedway
- Course: Permanent racing facility
- Course length: 1.5 miles (2.41 km)
- Distance: 200 laps, 300 mi (482.803 km)
- Scheduled distance: 200 laps, 300 mi (482.803 km)
- Average speed: 151.728 miles per hour (244.183 km/h)

Pole position
Driver	Kyle Benjamin	Joe Gibbs Racing
- Time: 29.633

Most laps led
Driver	Tyler Reddick	Chip Ganassi Racing
- Laps: 66

Winner
No. 42	Tyler Reddick	Chip Ganassi Racing

Television in the United States
- Network: NBCSN
- Announcers: Dave Burns, Dale Jarrett

Radio in the United States
- Radio: Performance Racing Network

The 2017 VisitMyrtleBeach.com 300 was the 27th stock car race of the 2017 NASCAR Xfinity Series season, the first race of the Round of 12, and the sixth iteration of the event. The race was held on Saturday, September 23, 2017, in Sparta, Kentucky, at Kentucky Speedway, a 1.5-mile (2.41 km) tri-oval speedway. The race took the scheduled 200 laps to complete. Tyler Reddick, driving for Chip Ganassi Racing, would dominate the late stages of the race to win his first career NASCAR Xfinity Series victory and his only win of the season. To fill out the podium, Brennan Poole, driving for Chip Ganassi Racing, and Justin Allgaier, driving for JR Motorsports, would finish second and third, respectively.

== Entry list ==
- (R) denotes rookie driver.
- (i) denotes driver who is ineligible for series driver points.

#	Driver	Team	Make
00	Cole Custer (R)	Stewart–Haas Racing	Ford
0	Garrett Smithley	JD Motorsports	Chevrolet
1	Elliott Sadler	JR Motorsports	Chevrolet
01	Harrison Rhodes	JD Motorsports	Chevrolet
2	Ben Kennedy (R)	Richard Childress Racing	Chevrolet
3	Brian Scott	Richard Childress Racing	Chevrolet
4	Ross Chastain	JD Motorsports	Chevrolet
5	Michael Annett	JR Motorsports	Chevrolet
7	Justin Allgaier	JR Motorsports	Chevrolet
07	Korbin Forrister (i)	SS-Green Light Racing	Chevrolet
8	B. J. McLeod	B. J. McLeod Motorsports	Chevrolet
9	William Byron (R)	JR Motorsports	Chevrolet
11	Blake Koch	Kaulig Racing	Chevrolet
13	Timmy Hill	MBM Motorsports	Dodge
14	J. J. Yeley	TriStar Motorsports	Toyota
16	Ryan Reed	Roush Fenway Racing	Ford
18	Kyle Benjamin	Joe Gibbs Racing	Toyota
19	Matt Tifft (R)	Joe Gibbs Racing	Toyota
20	Ryan Preece	Joe Gibbs Racing	Toyota
21	Daniel Hemric (R)	Richard Childress Racing	Chevrolet
22	Sam Hornish Jr.	Team Penske	Ford
23	Spencer Gallagher (R)	GMS Racing	Chevrolet
28	Dakoda Armstrong	JGL Racing	Toyota
33	Brandon Jones	Richard Childress Racing	Chevrolet
39	Ryan Sieg	RSS Racing	Chevrolet
40	John Jackson	MBM Motorsports	Chevrolet
42	Tyler Reddick	Chip Ganassi Racing	Chevrolet
46	Quin Houff	Precision Performance Motorsports	Chevrolet
48	Brennan Poole	Chip Ganassi Racing	Chevrolet
51	Jeremy Clements	Jeremy Clements Racing	Chevrolet
52	Joey Gase	Jimmy Means Racing	Chevrolet
62	Brendan Gaughan	Richard Childress Racing	Chevrolet
72	Carl Long	MBM Motorsports	Toyota
74	Mike Harmon	Mike Harmon Racing	Dodge
78	Angela Ruch	B. J. McLeod Motorsports	Chevrolet
89	Morgan Shepherd	Shepherd Racing Ventures	Chevrolet
90	Josh Williams	King Autosport	Chevrolet
92	Dexter Bean	King Autosport	Chevrolet
93	Jeff Green	RSS Racing	Chevrolet
99	David Starr	BJMM with SS-Green Light Racing	Chevrolet
Official entry list

== Practice ==
=== First practice ===
The first practice session was held on Friday, September 22, at 4:00 PM EST. The session would last for 55 minutes. Matt Tifft, driving for Joe Gibbs Racing, would set the fastest time in the session, with a lap of 29.929 and an average speed of 180.427 mph (290.369 km/h).

Pos	#	Driver	Team	Make	Time	Speed
1	19	Matt Tifft (R)	Joe Gibbs Racing	Toyota	29.929	180.427
2	3	Brian Scott	Richard Childress Racing	Chevrolet	30.125	179.253
3	20	Ryan Preece	Joe Gibbs Racing	Toyota	30.258	178.465
Full first practice results

=== Second and final practice ===
The final practice session, sometimes known as Happy Hour, was held on Friday, September 22, at 6:30 PM EST. The session would last for 55 minutes. Ryan Preece, driving for Joe Gibbs Racing, would set the fastest time in the session, with a lap of 29.731 and an average speed of 181.629 mph (292.304 km/h).

Pos	#	Driver	Team	Make	Time	Speed
1	20	Ryan Preece	Joe Gibbs Racing	Toyota	29.731	181.629
2	7	Justin Allgaier	JR Motorsports	Chevrolet	29.871	180.777
3	23	Spencer Gallagher (R)	GMS Racing	Chevrolet	29.981	180.114
Full Happy Hour practice results

== Qualifying ==
Qualifying was held on Saturday, September 23, at 5:35 PM EST. Since Kentucky Speedway is under 2 miles (3.2 km) in length, the qualifying system was a multi-car system that included three rounds. The first round was 15 minutes, where every driver would be able to set a lap within the 15 minutes. Then, the second round would consist of the fastest 24 cars in Round 1, and drivers would have 10 minutes to set a lap. Round 3 consisted of the fastest 12 drivers from Round 2, and the drivers would have 5 minutes to set a time. Whoever was fastest in Round 3 would win the pole.

Kyle Benjamin, driving for Joe Gibbs Racing, would win the pole after setting a time of 29.633 and an average speed of 182.229 mph (293.269 km/h) in the third round.

No drivers would fail to qualify.

=== Full qualifying results ===
Pos	#	Driver	Team	Make	Time (R1)	Speed (R1)	Time (R2)	Speed (R2)	Time (R3)	Speed (R3)
1	18	Kyle Benjamin	Joe Gibbs Racing	Toyota	29.906	180.566	29.859	180.850	29.633	182.229
2	20	Ryan Preece	Joe Gibbs Racing	Toyota	30.005	179.970	29.964	180.216	29.640	182.186
3	00	Cole Custer (R)	Stewart–Haas Racing	Ford	30.251	178.506	29.717	181.714	29.694	181.855
4	7	Justin Allgaier	JR Motorsports	Chevrolet	30.092	179.450	29.910	180.542	29.724	181.671
5	42	Tyler Reddick	Chip Ganassi Racing	Chevrolet	30.028	179.832	29.806	181.172	29.743	181.555
6	1	Elliott Sadler	JR Motorsports	Chevrolet	30.257	178.471	29.906	180.566	29.749	181.519
7	21	Daniel Hemric (R)	Richard Childress Racing	Chevrolet	30.078	179.533	29.865	180.814	29.751	181.507
8	48	Brennan Poole	Chip Ganassi Racing	Chevrolet	30.049	179.706	29.874	180.759	29.781	181.324
9	19	Matt Tifft (R)	Joe Gibbs Racing	Toyota	30.100	179.402	29.930	180.421	29.786	181.293
10	3	Brian Scott	Richard Childress Racing	Chevrolet	30.367	177.825	29.927	180.439	29.859	180.850
11	2	Ben Kennedy (R)	Richard Childress Racing	Chevrolet	29.767	181.409	29.880	180.723	29.891	180.656
12	9	William Byron (R)	JR Motorsports	Chevrolet	30.164	179.021	29.937	180.379	29.907	180.560
Eliminated in Round 2
13	16	Ryan Reed	Roush Fenway Racing	Ford	30.284	178.312	29.992	180.048	-	-
14	33	Brandon Jones	Richard Childress Racing	Chevrolet	29.964	180.216	30.051	179.695	-	-
15	22	Sam Hornish Jr.	Team Penske	Ford	30.098	179.414	30.090	179.462	-	-
16	62	Brendan Gaughan	Richard Childress Racing	Chevrolet	30.612	176.401	30.129	179.229	-	-
17	11	Blake Koch	Kaulig Racing	Chevrolet	30.431	177.451	30.246	178.536	-	-
18	5	Michael Annett	JR Motorsports	Chevrolet	30.535	176.846	30.277	178.353	-	-
19	23	Spencer Gallagher (R)	GMS Racing	Chevrolet	30.273	178.377	30.361	177.860	-	-
20	39	Ryan Sieg	RSS Racing	Chevrolet	30.438	177.410	30.388	177.702	-	-
21	4	Ross Chastain	JD Motorsports	Chevrolet	30.481	177.160	30.419	177.521	-	-
22	14	J. J. Yeley	TriStar Motorsports	Toyota	30.678	176.022	30.443	177.381	-	-
23	8	B. J. McLeod	B. J. McLeod Motorsports	Chevrolet	30.631	176.292	30.606	176.436	-	-
24	28	Dakoda Armstrong	JGL Racing	Toyota	30.594	176.505	30.854	175.018	-	-
Eliminated in Round 1
25	51	Jeremy Clements	Jeremy Clements Racing	Chevrolet	30.746	175.633	-	-	-	-
26	0	Garrett Smithley	JD Motorsports	Chevrolet	30.938	174.543	-	-	-	-
27	01	Harrison Rhodes	JD Motorsports	Chevrolet	30.975	174.334	-	-	-	-
28	99	David Starr	BJMM with SS-Green Light Racing	Chevrolet	31.060	173.857	-	-	-	-
29	46	Quin Houff	Precision Performance Motorsports	Chevrolet	31.139	173.416	-	-	-	-
30	93	Jeff Green	RSS Racing	Chevrolet	31.224	172.944	-	-	-	-
31	07	Korbin Forrister (i)	SS-Green Light Racing	Chevrolet	31.332	172.348	-	-	-	-
32	90	Josh Williams	King Autosport	Chevrolet	31.421	171.860	-	-	-	-
33	13	Timmy Hill	MBM Motorsports	Dodge	31.490	171.483	-	-	-	-
Qualified by owner's points
34	52	Joey Gase	Jimmy Means Racing	Chevrolet	31.581	170.989	-	-	-	-
35	78	Angela Ruch	B. J. McLeod Motorsports	Chevrolet	32.210	167.650	-	-	-	-
36	89	Morgan Shepherd	Shepherd Racing Ventures	Chevrolet	32.334	167.007	-	-	-	-
37	72	Carl Long	MBM Motorsports	Toyota	32.707	165.102	-	-	-	-
38	92	Dexter Bean	King Autosport	Chevrolet	32.736	164.956	-	-	-	-
39	40	John Jackson	MBM Motorsports	Chevrolet	33.634	160.552	-	-	-	-
40	74	Mike Harmon	Mike Harmon Racing	Dodge	33.649	160.480	-	-	-	-
Official qualifying results
Official starting lineup

== Race results ==
Stage 1 Laps: 45

Pos	#	Driver	Team	Make	Pts
1	00	Cole Custer (R)	Stewart–Haas Racing	Ford	10
2	42	Tyler Reddick	Chip Ganassi Racing	Chevrolet	9
3	18	Kyle Benjamin	Joe Gibbs Racing	Toyota	8
4	20	Ryan Preece	Joe Gibbs Racing	Toyota	7
5	48	Brennan Poole	Chip Ganassi Racing	Chevrolet	6
6	21	Daniel Hemric (R)	Richard Childress Racing	Chevrolet	5
7	19	Matt Tifft (R)	Joe Gibbs Racing	Toyota	4
8	1	Elliott Sadler	JR Motorsports	Chevrolet	3
9	3	Brian Scott	Richard Childress Racing	Chevrolet	2
10	9	William Byron (R)	JR Motorsports	Chevrolet	1

Stage 2 Laps: 45

Pos	#	Driver	Team	Make	Pts
1	00	Cole Custer (R)	Stewart–Haas Racing	Ford	10
2	42	Tyler Reddick	Chip Ganassi Racing	Chevrolet	9
3	21	Daniel Hemric (R)	Richard Childress Racing	Chevrolet	8
4	20	Ryan Preece	Joe Gibbs Racing	Toyota	7
5	9	William Byron (R)	JR Motorsports	Chevrolet	6
6	3	Brian Scott	Richard Childress Racing	Chevrolet	5
7	18	Kyle Benjamin	Joe Gibbs Racing	Toyota	4
8	2	Ben Kennedy (R)	Richard Childress Racing	Chevrolet	3
9	16	Ryan Reed	Roush Fenway Racing	Ford	2
10	1	Elliott Sadler	JR Motorsports	Chevrolet	1

Stage 3 Laps: 110

Pos	#	Driver	Team	Make	Laps	Led	Status	Pts
1	42	Tyler Reddick	Chip Ganassi Racing	Chevrolet	200	66	running	58
2	48	Brennan Poole	Chip Ganassi Racing	Chevrolet	200	0	running	41
3	7	Justin Allgaier	JR Motorsports	Chevrolet	200	0	running	34
4	20	Ryan Preece	Joe Gibbs Racing	Toyota	200	22	running	47
5	00	Cole Custer (R)	Stewart–Haas Racing	Ford	200	49	running	52
6	1	Elliott Sadler	JR Motorsports	Chevrolet	200	11	running	35
7	21	Daniel Hemric (R)	Richard Childress Racing	Chevrolet	200	0	running	43
8	3	Brian Scott	Richard Childress Racing	Chevrolet	200	0	running	36
9	19	Matt Tifft (R)	Joe Gibbs Racing	Toyota	200	0	running	32
10	16	Ryan Reed	Roush Fenway Racing	Ford	199	0	running	29
11	2	Ben Kennedy (R)	Richard Childress Racing	Chevrolet	199	0	running	19
12	18	Kyle Benjamin	Joe Gibbs Racing	Toyota	199	52	running	37
13	33	Brandon Jones	Richard Childress Racing	Chevrolet	199	0	running	24
14	62	Brendan Gaughan	Richard Childress Racing	Chevrolet	199	0	running	23
15	23	Spencer Gallagher (R)	GMS Racing	Chevrolet	199	0	running	22
16	5	Michael Annett	JR Motorsports	Chevrolet	199	0	running	21
17	11	Blake Koch	Kaulig Racing	Chevrolet	198	0	running	20
18	9	William Byron (R)	JR Motorsports	Chevrolet	198	0	running	26
19	14	J. J. Yeley	TriStar Motorsports	Toyota	198	0	running	18
20	39	Ryan Sieg	RSS Racing	Chevrolet	198	0	running	17
21	4	Ross Chastain	JD Motorsports	Chevrolet	198	0	running	16
22	51	Jeremy Clements	Jeremy Clements Racing	Chevrolet	198	0	running	15
23	28	Dakoda Armstrong	JGL Racing	Toyota	196	0	running	14
24	01	Harrison Rhodes	JD Motorsports	Chevrolet	196	0	running	13
25	0	Garrett Smithley	JD Motorsports	Chevrolet	196	0	running	12
26	90	Josh Williams	King Autosport	Chevrolet	196	0	running	11
27	46	Quin Houff	Precision Performance Motorsports	Chevrolet	196	0	running	10
28	8	B. J. McLeod	B. J. McLeod Motorsports	Chevrolet	194	0	running	9
29	99	David Starr	BJMM with SS-Green Light Racing	Chevrolet	194	0	running	8
30	52	Joey Gase	Jimmy Means Racing	Chevrolet	193	0	running	7
31	22	Sam Hornish Jr.	Team Penske	Ford	191	0	running	6
32	78	Angela Ruch	B. J. McLeod Motorsports	Chevrolet	190	0	running	5
33	07	Korbin Forrister (i)	SS-Green Light Racing	Chevrolet	188	0	running	0
34	74	Mike Harmon	Mike Harmon Racing	Dodge	65	0	fuel pump	3
35	40	John Jackson	MBM Motorsports	Chevrolet	59	0	engine	2
36	13	Timmy Hill	MBM Motorsports	Dodge	55	0	overheating	1
37	89	Morgan Shepherd	Shepherd Racing Ventures	Chevrolet	27	0	handling	1
38	92	Dexter Bean	King Autosport	Chevrolet	27	0	vibration	1
39	72	Carl Long	MBM Motorsports	Toyota	24	0	engine	1
40	93	Jeff Green	RSS Racing	Chevrolet	16	0	vibration	1
Official race results

== Standings after the race ==
Drivers' Championship standings

	Pos	Driver	Points
1	1	Justin Allgaier	2,057
6	2	Cole Custer	2,057 (-0)
	3	Elliott Sadler	2,055 (–2)
	4	Daniel Hemric	2,052 (–5)
4	5	William Byron	2,051 (–6)
1	6	Brennan Poole	2,047 (-10)
3	7	Matt Tifft	2,036 (-21)
2	8	Ryan Reed	2,034 (-23)
2	9	Brendan Gaughan	2,026 (-31)
2	10	Blake Koch	2,025 (-32)
1	11	Michael Annett	2,022 (-35)
5	12	Jeremy Clements	2,020 (-37)
Official driver's standings

- Note: Only the first 12 positions are included for the driver standings.

Previous race: 2017 TheHouse.com 300	NASCAR Xfinity Series; 2017 season	Next race: 2017 Use Your Melon. Drive Sober 200
