= 2017 Virginia 529 College Savings 250 =

25th race of the 2017 NASCAR Xfinity Series

Race details
- Race 25 of 33 in the 2017 NASCAR Xfinity Series
- Date: September 8, 2017
- Official name: 37th Annual Virginia 529 College Savings 250
- Location: Richmond, Virginia, Richmond Raceway
- Course: Permanent racing facility
- Course length: 0.75 miles (1.21 km)
- Distance: 250 laps, 187.5 mi (301.752 km)
- Scheduled distance: 250 laps, 187.5 mi (301.752 km)
- Average speed: 97.614 miles per hour (157.095 km/h)

Pole position
Driver	Kyle Busch	Joe Gibbs Racing
- Time: 22.638

Most laps led
Driver	Kyle Busch	Joe Gibbs Racing
- Laps: 182

Winner
No. 22	Brad Keselowski	Team Penske

Television in the United States
- Network: NBCSN
- Announcers: Rick Allen, Jeff Burton, Steve Letarte

Radio in the United States
- Radio: Motor Racing Network

The 2017 Virginia 529 College Savings 250 was the 25th stock car race of the 2017 NASCAR Xfinity Series season and the 37th iteration of the event. The race was held on Friday, September 8, 2017, in Richmond, Virginia, at Richmond International Raceway, a 0.75 miles (1.21 km) D-shaped oval. The race took the scheduled 250 laps to complete. In the final stages of the race, Brad Keselowski, driving for Team Penske, would pull away from the field to win his 36th career NASCAR Xfinity Series win and his second and final win of the season. To fill out the podium, Kyle Busch, driving for Joe Gibbs Racing, and Ty Dillon, driving for Richard Childress Racing, would finish second and third, respectively.

== Entry list ==
- (R) denotes rookie driver.
- (i) denotes driver who is ineligible for series driver points.

#	Driver	Team	Make
0	Garrett Smithley	JD Motorsports	Chevrolet
00	Cole Custer (R)	Stewart–Haas Racing	Ford
1	Elliott Sadler	JR Motorsports	Chevrolet
01	Harrison Rhodes	JD Motorsports	Chevrolet
2	Paul Menard (i)	Richard Childress Racing	Chevrolet
3	Ty Dillon (i)	Richard Childress Racing	Chevrolet
4	Ross Chastain	JD Motorsports	Chevrolet
5	Michael Annett	JR Motorsports	Chevrolet
7	Justin Allgaier	JR Motorsports	Chevrolet
07	Ray Black Jr.	SS-Green Light Racing	Chevrolet
8	Tommy Joe Martins	B. J. McLeod Motorsports	Chevrolet
9	William Byron (R)	JR Motorsports	Chevrolet
11	Blake Koch	Kaulig Racing	Chevrolet
13	Timmy Hill	MBM Motorsports	Dodge
14	J. J. Yeley	TriStar Motorsports	Toyota
15	Reed Sorenson (i)	JD Motorsports	Chevrolet
16	Ryan Reed	Roush Fenway Racing	Ford
18	Kyle Busch (i)	Joe Gibbs Racing	Toyota
19	Matt Tifft (R)	Joe Gibbs Racing	Toyota
20	Christopher Bell (i)	Joe Gibbs Racing	Toyota
21	Daniel Hemric (R)	Richard Childress Racing	Chevrolet
22	Brad Keselowski (i)	Team Penske	Ford
23	Spencer Gallagher (R)	GMS Racing	Chevrolet
24	Dylan Lupton	JGL Racing	Toyota
28	Dakoda Armstrong	JGL Racing	Toyota
33	Brandon Jones	Richard Childress Racing	Chevrolet
39	Ryan Sieg	RSS Racing	Chevrolet
40	Bobby Dale Earnhardt	MBM Motorsports	Chevrolet
42	Tyler Reddick	Chip Ganassi Racing	Chevrolet
48	Brennan Poole	Chip Ganassi Racing	Chevrolet
51	Jeremy Clements	Jeremy Clements Racing	Chevrolet
52	Joey Gase	Jimmy Means Racing	Chevrolet
62	Brendan Gaughan	Richard Childress Racing	Chevrolet
74	Mike Harmon	Mike Harmon Racing	Dodge
78	John Graham	B. J. McLeod Motorsports	Chevrolet
88	Dale Earnhardt Jr. (i)	JR Motorsports	Chevrolet
89	Morgan Shepherd	Shepherd Racing Ventures	Chevrolet
90	Brandon Brown	Brandonbilt Motorsports	Chevrolet
93	Jeff Green	RSS Racing	Chevrolet
98	Casey Mears	Biagi-DenBeste Racing	Ford
99	David Starr	BJMM with SS-Green Light Racing	Chevrolet
Official entry list

== Practice ==
The only one hour and 55-minute practice session was held on Friday, September 8, at 8:00 AM EST. Blake Koch, driving for Kaulig Racing, would set the fastest time in the session, with a lap of 21.967 and an average speed of 122.912 mph (197.808 km/h).

Pos	#	Driver	Team	Make	Time	Speed
1	11	Blake Koch	Kaulig Racing	Chevrolet	21.967	122.912
2	9	William Byron (R)	JR Motorsports	Chevrolet	22.106	122.139
3	33	Brandon Jones	Richard Childress Racing	Chevrolet	22.159	121.847
Full practice results

== Qualifying ==
Qualifying was held on Friday, September 8, at 4:15 PM EST. Since Richmond Raceway is under 2 miles (3.2 km) in length, the qualifying system was a multi-car system that included three rounds. The first round was 15 minutes, where every driver would be able to set a lap within the 15 minutes. Then, the second round would consist of the fastest 24 cars in Round 1, and drivers would have 10 minutes to set a lap. Round 3 consisted of the fastest 12 drivers from Round 2, and the drivers would have 5 minutes to set a time. Whoever was fastest in Round 3 would win the pole.

Kyle Busch, driving for Joe Gibbs Racing, would win the pole after setting a time of 22.638 and an average speed of 119.268 mph (191.943 km/h) in the third round.

Morgan Shepherd was the only driver to fail to qualify.

=== Full qualifying results ===
Pos	#	Driver	Team	Make	Time (R1)	Speed (R1)	Time (R2)	Speed (R2)	Time (R3)	Speed (R3)
1	18	Kyle Busch (i)	Joe Gibbs Racing	Toyota	-*	-*	-*	-*	22.638	119.268
2	48	Brennan Poole	Chip Ganassi Racing	Chevrolet	-*	-*	-*	-*	22.722	118.828
3	22	Brad Keselowski (i)	Team Penske	Ford	-*	-*	-*	-*	22.746	118.702
4	00	Cole Custer (R)	Stewart–Haas Racing	Ford	-*	-*	-*	-*	22.749	118.687
5	88	Dale Earnhardt Jr. (i)	JR Motorsports	Chevrolet	-*	-*	-*	-*	22.765	118.603
6	9	William Byron (R)	JR Motorsports	Chevrolet	-*	-*	-*	-*	22.781	118.520
7	11	Blake Koch	Kaulig Racing	Chevrolet	-*	-*	-*	-*	22.810	118.369
8	21	Daniel Hemric (R)	Richard Childress Racing	Chevrolet	-*	-*	-*	-*	22.821	118.312
9	7	Justin Allgaier	JR Motorsports	Chevrolet	-*	-*	-*	-*	22.841	118.208
10	2	Paul Menard (i)	Richard Childress Racing	Chevrolet	-*	-*	-*	-*	22.867	118.074
11	1	Elliott Sadler	JR Motorsports	Chevrolet	-*	-*	-*	-*	22.881	118.002
12	16	Ryan Reed	Roush Fenway Racing	Ford	-*	-*	-*	-*	23.107	116.848
Eliminated in Round 2
13	19	Matt Tifft (R)	Joe Gibbs Racing	Toyota	-*	-*	22.784	118.504	-	-
14	20	Christopher Bell (i)	Joe Gibbs Racing	Toyota	-*	-*	22.806	118.390	-	-
15	51	Jeremy Clements	Jeremy Clements Racing	Chevrolet	-*	-*	22.809	118.374	-	-
16	3	Ty Dillon (i)	Richard Childress Racing	Chevrolet	-*	-*	22.845	118.188	-	-
17	62	Brendan Gaughan	Richard Childress Racing	Chevrolet	-*	-*	22.867	118.074	-	-
18	5	Michael Annett	JR Motorsports	Chevrolet	-*	-*	22.965	117.570	-	-
19	39	Ryan Sieg	RSS Racing	Chevrolet	-*	-*	23.018	117.300	-	-
20	24	Dylan Lupton	JGL Racing	Toyota	-*	-*	23.089	116.939	-	-
21	4	Ross Chastain	JD Motorsports	Chevrolet	-*	-*	23.111	116.827	-	-
22	98	Casey Mears	Biagi-DenBeste Racing	Ford	-*	-*	23.166	116.550	-	-
23	23	Spencer Gallagher (R)	GMS Racing	Chevrolet	-*	-*	23.314	115.810	-	-
24	90	Brandon Brown	Brandonbilt Motorsports	Chevrolet	-*	-*	23.345	115.656	-	-
Eliminated in Round 1
25	42	Tyler Reddick	Chip Ganassi Racing	Chevrolet	22.975	117.519	-	-	-	-
26	33	Brandon Jones	Richard Childress Racing	Chevrolet	22.977	117.509	-	-	-	-
27	93	Jeff Green	RSS Racing	Chevrolet	22.982	117.483	-	-	-	-
28	52	Joey Gase	Jimmy Means Racing	Chevrolet	23.087	116.949	-	-	-	-
29	99	David Starr	BJMM with SS-Green Light Racing	Chevrolet	23.154	116.611	-	-	-	-
30	14	J. J. Yeley	TriStar Motorsports	Toyota	23.164	116.560	-	-	-	-
31	28	Dakoda Armstrong	JGL Racing	Toyota	23.169	116.535	-	-	-	-
32	13	Timmy Hill	MBM Motorsports	Dodge	23.232	116.219	-	-	-	-
33	15	Reed Sorenson (i)	JD Motorsports	Chevrolet	23.372	115.523	-	-	-	-
Qualified by owner's points
34	07	Spencer Boyd	SS-Green Light Racing	Chevrolet	23.590	114.455	-	-	-	-
35	8	Tommy Joe Martins	B. J. McLeod Motorsports	Chevrolet	23.729	113.785	-	-	-	-
36	74	Mike Harmon	Mike Harmon Racing	Dodge	23.902	112.961	-	-	-	-
37	78	John Graham	B. J. McLeod Motorsports	Chevrolet	24.445	110.452	-	-	-	-
38	01	Harrison Rhodes	JD Motorsports	Chevrolet	24.751	109.087	-	-	-	-
39	0	Garrett Smithley	JD Motorsports	Chevrolet	24.874	108.547	-	-	-	-
40	40	Bobby Dale Earnhardt	MBM Motorsports	Chevrolet	25.244	106.956	-	-	-	-
Failed to qualify
41	89	Morgan Shepherd	Shepherd Racing Ventures	Chevrolet	23.441	115.183	-	-	-	-
Official starting lineup

*Time not available.

== Race results ==
Stage 1 Laps: 75

Pos	#	Driver	Team	Make	Pts
1	3	Ty Dillon (i)	Richard Childress Racing	Chevrolet	0
2	20	Christopher Bell (i)	Joe Gibbs Racing	Toyota	0
3	62	Brendan Gaughan	Richard Childress Racing	Chevrolet	8
4	21	Daniel Hemric (R)	Richard Childress Racing	Chevrolet	7
5	22	Brad Keselowski (i)	Team Penske	Ford	0
6	18	Kyle Busch (i)	Joe Gibbs Racing	Toyota	0
7	00	Cole Custer (R)	Stewart–Haas Racing	Ford	4
8	88	Dale Earnhardt Jr. (i)	JR Motorsports	Chevrolet	0
9	2	Paul Menard (i)	Richard Childress Racing	Chevrolet	0
10	7	Justin Allgaier	JR Motorsports	Chevrolet	1

Stage 2 Laps: 75

Pos	#	Driver	Team	Make	Pts
1	22	Brad Keselowski (i)	Team Penske	Ford	0
2	18	Kyle Busch (i)	Joe Gibbs Racing	Toyota	0
3	21	Daniel Hemric (R)	Richard Childress Racing	Chevrolet	8
4	3	Ty Dillon (i)	Richard Childress Racing	Chevrolet	0
5	88	Dale Earnhardt Jr. (i)	JR Motorsports	Chevrolet	0
6	7	Justin Allgaier	JR Motorsports	Chevrolet	5
7	1	Elliott Sadler	JR Motorsports	Chevrolet	4
8	2	Paul Menard (i)	Richard Childress Racing	Chevrolet	0
9	9	William Byron (R)	JR Motorsports	Chevrolet	2
10	20	Christopher Bell (i)	Joe Gibbs Racing	Toyota	0

Stage 3 Laps: 100

Pos	#	Driver	Team	Make	Laps	Led	Status	Pts
1	22	Brad Keselowski (i)	Team Penske	Ford	250	34	running	0
2	18	Kyle Busch (i)	Joe Gibbs Racing	Toyota	250	182	running	0
3	3	Ty Dillon (i)	Richard Childress Racing	Chevrolet	250	16	running	0
4	21	Daniel Hemric (R)	Richard Childress Racing	Chevrolet	250	13	running	48
5	1	Elliott Sadler	JR Motorsports	Chevrolet	250	0	running	36
6	20	Christopher Bell (i)	Joe Gibbs Racing	Toyota	250	0	running	0
7	9	William Byron (R)	JR Motorsports	Chevrolet	250	0	running	32
8	7	Justin Allgaier	JR Motorsports	Chevrolet	250	0	running	35
9	88	Dale Earnhardt Jr. (i)	JR Motorsports	Chevrolet	250	0	running	0
10	48	Brennan Poole	Chip Ganassi Racing	Chevrolet	249	0	running	27
11	11	Blake Koch	Kaulig Racing	Chevrolet	249	0	running	26
12	16	Ryan Reed	Roush Fenway Racing	Ford	249	0	running	25
13	19	Matt Tifft (R)	Joe Gibbs Racing	Toyota	249	0	running	24
14	00	Cole Custer (R)	Stewart–Haas Racing	Ford	249	0	running	27
15	5	Michael Annett	JR Motorsports	Chevrolet	249	0	running	22
16	51	Jeremy Clements	Jeremy Clements Racing	Chevrolet	249	0	running	21
17	42	Tyler Reddick	Chip Ganassi Racing	Chevrolet	249	0	running	20
18	28	Dakoda Armstrong	JGL Racing	Toyota	249	0	running	19
19	2	Paul Menard (i)	Richard Childress Racing	Chevrolet	248	0	running	0
20	14	J. J. Yeley	TriStar Motorsports	Toyota	248	0	running	17
21	62	Brendan Gaughan	Richard Childress Racing	Chevrolet	248	5	running	24
22	23	Spencer Gallagher (R)	GMS Racing	Chevrolet	247	0	running	15
23	33	Brandon Jones	Richard Childress Racing	Chevrolet	247	0	running	14
24	24	Dylan Lupton	JGL Racing	Toyota	247	0	running	13
25	98	Casey Mears	Biagi-DenBeste Racing	Ford	246	0	running	12
26	39	Ryan Sieg	RSS Racing	Chevrolet	246	0	running	11
27	90	Brandon Brown	Brandonbilt Motorsports	Chevrolet	246	0	running	10
28	4	Ross Chastain	JD Motorsports	Chevrolet	245	0	running	9
29	8	Tommy Joe Martins	B. J. McLeod Motorsports	Chevrolet	244	0	running	8
30	01	Harrison Rhodes	JD Motorsports	Chevrolet	243	0	running	7
31	07	Spencer Boyd	SS-Green Light Racing	Chevrolet	242	0	running	6
32	0	Garrett Smithley	JD Motorsports	Chevrolet	241	0	running	5
33	74	Mike Harmon	Mike Harmon Racing	Dodge	233	0	running	4
34	40	Bobby Dale Earnhardt	MBM Motorsports	Chevrolet	229	0	running	3
35	99	David Starr	BJMM with SS-Green Light Racing	Chevrolet	216	0	clutch	2
36	52	Joey Gase	Jimmy Means Racing	Chevrolet	164	0	rear gear	1
37	78	John Graham	B. J. McLeod Motorsports	Chevrolet	78	0	rear gear	1
38	13	Timmy Hill	MBM Motorsports	Dodge	33	0	overheating	1
39	15	Reed Sorenson (i)	JD Motorsports	Chevrolet	17	0	vibration	0
40	93	Jeff Green	RSS Racing	Chevrolet	8	0	electrical	1
Official race results

== Standings after the race ==
Drivers' Championship standings

	Pos	Driver	Points
	1	Elliott Sadler	894
	2	William Byron	799 (-95)
	3	Justin Allgaier	774 (–120)
1	4	Daniel Hemric	702 (–192)
1	5	Brennan Poole	701 (–193)
	6	Cole Custer	617 (-277)
	7	Matt Tifft	582 (-312)
	8	Blake Koch	537 (-357)
1	9	Ryan Reed	512 (-382)
1	10	Michael Annett	512 (-382)
	11	Brendan Gaughan	511 (-383)
	12	Dakoda Armstrong	486 (-408)
Official driver's standings

- Note: Only the first 12 positions are included for the driver standings.

Previous race: 2017 Sport Clips Haircuts VFW 200	NASCAR Xfinity Series; 2017 season	Next race: 2017 TheHouse.com 300
