= 2017 Sport Clips Haircuts VFW 200 =

24th race of the 2017 NASCAR Xfinity Series

Race details
- Race 24 of 33 in the 2017 NASCAR Xfinity Series
- Date: September 2, 2017
- Official name: 25th Annual Sport Clips Haircuts VFW 200
- Location: Darlington Raceway, Darlington, South Carolina
- Course: Permanent racing facility
- Course length: 1.366 miles (2.198 km)
- Distance: 148 laps, 202.168 mi (325.357 km)
- Scheduled distance: 147 laps, 200.8 mi (323.156 km)
- Average speed: 108.256 mph (174.221 km/h)

Pole position
Driver	Denny Hamlin	Joe Gibbs Racing
- Time: 28.556

Most laps led
Driver	Joey Logano	Team Penske
- Laps: 58

Winner
No. 18	Denny Hamlin	Joe Gibbs Racing

Television in the United States
- Network: NBCSN
- Announcers: Rick Allen, Jeff Burton, Steve Letarte

Radio in the United States
- Radio: Motor Racing Network

The 2017 Sport Clips Haircuts VFW 200 was the 24th stock car race of the 2017 NASCAR Xfinity Series season, and the 25th iteration of the event. The race was held on Saturday, September 2, 2017, in Darlington, South Carolina at Darlington Raceway, a 1.366 miles (2.198 km) permanent tri-oval racetrack. The race was increased from 147 laps to 148 laps, due to a NASCAR overtime finish. Denny Hamlin, driving for Joe Gibbs Racing, held off Joey Logano in an exciting battle with 2 laps to go, and would earn his 17th career NASCAR Xfinity Series win, along with his first of the season. To fill out the podium, Kevin Harvick, driving for Stewart–Haas Racing, would finish in 3rd, respectively.

== Entry list ==
- (R) denotes rookie driver.
- (i) denotes driver who is ineligible for series driver points.

#	Driver	Team	Make
00	Cole Custer (R)	Stewart–Haas Racing	Ford
0	Garrett Smithley	JD Motorsports	Chevrolet
01	Harrison Rhodes	JD Motorsports	Chevrolet
1	Elliott Sadler	JR Motorsports	Chevrolet
2	Austin Dillon (i)	Richard Childress Racing	Chevrolet
3	Ty Dillon (i)	Richard Childress Racing	Chevrolet
4	Ross Chastain	JD Motorsports	Chevrolet
5	Michael Annett	JR Motorsports	Chevrolet
07	Ray Black Jr.	SS-Green Light Racing	Chevrolet
7	Justin Allgaier	JR Motorsports	Chevrolet
8	B. J. McLeod	B. J. McLeod Motorsports	Chevrolet
9	William Byron (R)	JR Motorsports	Chevrolet
11	Blake Koch	Kaulig Racing	Chevrolet
13	Carl Long	MBM Motorsports	Dodge
14	J. J. Yeley	TriStar Motorsports	Toyota
15	Reed Sorenson (i)	JD Motorsports	Chevrolet
16	Ryan Reed	Roush Fenway Racing	Ford
18	Denny Hamlin (i)	Joe Gibbs Racing	Toyota
19	Matt Tifft (R)	Joe Gibbs Racing	Toyota
20	Erik Jones (i)	Joe Gibbs Racing	Toyota
21	Daniel Hemric (R)	Richard Childress Racing	Chevrolet
22	Joey Logano (i)	Team Penske	Ford
23	Spencer Gallagher (R)	GMS Racing	Chevrolet
24	Dylan Lupton	JGL Racing	Toyota
28	Dakoda Armstrong	JGL Racing	Toyota
33	Brandon Jones	Richard Childress Racing	Chevrolet
39	Ryan Sieg	RSS Racing	Chevrolet
40	Timmy Hill	MBM Motorsports	Dodge
41	Kevin Harvick (i)	Stewart–Haas Racing	Ford
42	Tyler Reddick	Chip Ganassi Racing	Chevrolet
48	Brennan Poole	Chip Ganassi Racing	Chevrolet
51	Jeremy Clements	Jeremy Clements Racing	Chevrolet
52	Joey Gase	Jimmy Means Racing	Chevrolet
62	Brendan Gaughan	Richard Childress Racing	Chevrolet
74	Mike Harmon	Mike Harmon Racing	Dodge
78	Tommy Joe Martins	B. J. McLeod Motorsports	Chevrolet
90	Brandon Brown	Brandonbilt Motorsports	Chevrolet
93	Jeff Green	RSS Racing	Chevrolet
96	Ben Kennedy (R)	GMS Racing	Chevrolet
99	David Starr	BJMM with SS-Green Light Racing	Chevrolet
Official entry list

== Practice ==
=== First practice ===
The first 55-minute practice session was held on Friday, September 1, at 12:00 PM EST. Denny Hamlin, driving for Joe Gibbs Racing, would set the fastest time in the session, with a lap of 28.824 and an average speed of 170.608 mph (274.567 km/h).

Pos	#	Driver	Team	Make	Time	Speed
1	18	Denny Hamlin (i)	Joe Gibbs Racing	Toyota	28.824	170.608
2	42	Tyler Reddick	Chip Ganassi Racing	Chevrolet	28.875	170.306
3	7	Justin Allgaier	JR Motorsports	Chevrolet	28.913	170.083
Full first practice results

=== Final practice ===
The final 55-minute practice session was held on Friday, September 1, at 2:30 PM EST. Once again, Denny Hamlin, driving for Joe Gibbs Racing, set the fastest time in the session, with a lap of 29.403 and an average speed of 167.248 mph (269.160 km/h).

Pos	#	Driver	Team	Make	Time	Speed
1	18	Denny Hamlin (i)	Joe Gibbs Racing	Toyota	29.403	167.248
2	20	Erik Jones (i)	Joe Gibbs Racing	Toyota	29.517	166.602
3	00	Cole Custer (R)	Stewart–Haas Racing	Ford	29.579	166.253
Full final practice results

== Qualifying ==
Qualifying was held on Saturday, September 2, at 12:05 PM EST. Since Darlington Raceway is under 2 miles (3.2 km), the qualifying system was a multi-car system that included three rounds. The first round was 15 minutes, where every driver would be able to set a lap within the 15 minutes. Then, the second round would consist of the fastest 24 cars in Round 1, and drivers would have 10 minutes to set a lap. Round 3 consisted of the fastest 12 drivers from Round 2, and the drivers would have 5 minutes to set a time. Whoever was fastest in Round 3 would win the pole.

Denny Hamlin, driving for Joe Gibbs Racing, scored the pole for the race, with a lap of 28.556 and an average speed of 172.209 mph (277.144 km/h).

=== Full starting lineup ===
Pos	#	Driver	Team	Make	Time (R1)	Speed (R1)	Time (R2)	Speed (R2)	Time (R3)	Speed (R3)
1	18	Denny Hamlin (i)	Joe Gibbs Racing	Toyota	28.711	171.279	28.657	171.602	28.556	172.209
2	41	Kevin Harvick (i)	Stewart–Haas Racing	Ford	28.808	170.703	28.703	171.327	28.685	171.435
3	21	Daniel Hemric (R)	Richard Childress Racing	Chevrolet	28.728	171.178	28.613	171.866	28.736	171.130
4	00	Cole Custer (R)	Stewart–Haas Racing	Ford	28.761	170.982	28.707	171.303	28.755	171.017
5	3	Ty Dillon (i)	Richard Childress Racing	Chevrolet	28.785	170.839	28.856	170.419	28.791	170.803
6	9	William Byron (R)	JR Motorsports	Chevrolet	29.119	168.879	28.809	170.697	28.839	170.519
7	1	Elliott Sadler	JR Motorsports	Chevrolet	28.858	170.407	28.789	170.815	28.858	170.407
8	48	Brennan Poole	Chip Ganassi Racing	Chevrolet	28.938	169.936	28.886	170.242	28.861	170.389
9	2	Austin Dillon (i)	Richard Childress Racing	Chevrolet	29.022	169.444	28.755	171.017	28.869	170.342
10	22	Joey Logano (i)	Team Penske	Ford	28.743	171.089	28.805	170.720	28.880	170.277
11	20	Erik Jones (i)	Joe Gibbs Racing	Toyota	28.738	171.118	28.811	170.685	28.996	169.596
12	42	Tyler Reddick	Chip Ganassi Racing	Chevrolet	28.842	170.501	28.868	170.348	29.004	169.549
Eliminated from Round 2
13	7	Justin Allgaier	JR Motorsports	Chevrolet	28.797	170.768	28.968	169.760	-	-
14	19	Matt Tifft (R)	Joe Gibbs Racing	Toyota	28.862	170.383	29.008	169.526	-	-
15	96	Ben Kennedy (R)	GMS Racing	Chevrolet	28.895	170.189	29.019	169.461	-	-
16	4	Ross Chastain	JD Motorsports	Chevrolet	28.805	170.720	29.038	169.351	-	-
17	16	Ryan Reed	Roush Fenway Racing	Ford	28.993	169.613	29.075	169.135	-	-
18	11	Blake Koch	Kaulig Racing	Chevrolet	29.117	168.891	29.108	168.943	-	-
19	62	Brendan Gaughan	Richard Childress Racing	Chevrolet	29.166	168.607	29.139	168.764	-	-
20	23	Spencer Gallagher (R)	GMS Racing	Chevrolet	28.970	169.748	29.159	168.648	-	-
21	5	Michael Annett	JR Motorsports	Chevrolet	29.215	168.324	29.174	168.561	-	-
22	14	J. J. Yeley	TriStar Motorsports	Toyota	29.088	169.059	29.426	167.118	-	-
23	24	Dylan Lupton	JGL Racing	Toyota	29.404	167.243	29.718	165.475	-	-
24	28	Dakoda Armstrong	JGL Racing	Toyota	29.406	167.231	-	-	-	-
Eliminated from Round 1
25	51	Jeremy Clements	Jeremy Clements Racing	Chevrolet	29.406	167.231	-	-	-	-
26	39	Ryan Sieg	RSS Racing	Chevrolet	29.418	167.163	-	-	-	-
27	33	Brandon Jones	Richard Childress Racing	Chevrolet	29.425	167.123	-	-	-	-
28	93	Jeff Green	RSS Racing	Chevrolet	29.612	166.068	-	-	-	-
29	07	Ray Black Jr.	SS-Green Light Racing	Chevrolet	29.762	165.231	-	-	-	-
30	40	Timmy Hill	MBM Motorsports	Dodge	29.942	164.238	-	-	-	-
31	90	Brandon Brown	Brandonbilt Motorsports	Chevrolet	29.948	164.205	-	-	-	-
32	0	Garrett Smithley	JD Motorsports	Chevrolet	29.952	164.183	-	-	-	-
33	8	B. J. McLeod	B. J. McLeod Motorsports	Chevrolet	30.018	163.822	-	-	-	-
Qualified by owner's points
34	52	Joey Gase	Jimmy Means Racing	Chevrolet	30.038	163.713	-	-	-	-
35	99	David Starr	BJMM with SS-Green Light Racing	Chevrolet	30.134	163.191	-	-	-	-
36	01	Harrison Rhodes	JD Motorsports	Chevrolet	30.232	162.662	-	-	-	-
37	78	Tommy Joe Martins	B. J. McLeod Motorsports	Chevrolet	30.337	162.099	-	-	-	-
38	13	Carl Long	MBM Motorsports	Dodge	30.502	161.222	-	-	-	-
39	89	Morgan Shepherd	Shepherd Racing Ventures	Chevrolet	30.861	158.596	-	-	-	-
40	74	Mike Harmon	Mike Harmon Racing	Dodge	31.007	159.347	-	-	-	-
Failed to qualify
41	15	Reed Sorenson (i)	JD Motorsports	Chevrolet	-	-	-	-	-	-
Official qualifying results
Official starting lineup

== Race results ==
Stage 1 Laps: 45

Pos	#	Driver	Team	Make	Pts
1	41	Kevin Harvick (i)	Stewart–Haas Racing	Ford	0
2	1	Elliott Sadler	JR Motorsports	Chevrolet	9
3	3	Ty Dillon (i)	Richard Childress Racing	Chevrolet	0
4	18	Denny Hamlin (i)	Joe Gibbs Racing	Toyota	0
5	22	Joey Logano (i)	Team Penske	Ford	0
6	20	Erik Jones (i)	Joe Gibbs Racing	Toyota	0
7	48	Brennan Poole	Chip Ganassi Racing	Chevrolet	4
8	2	Austin Dillon (i)	Richard Childress Racing	Chevrolet	0
9	9	William Byron (R)	JR Motorsports	Chevrolet	2
10	21	Daniel Hemric (R)	Richard Childress Racing	Chevrolet	1

Stage 2 Laps: 45

Pos	#	Driver	Team	Make	Pts
1	41	Kevin Harvick (i)	Stewart–Haas Racing	Ford	0
2	18	Denny Hamlin (i)	Joe Gibbs Racing	Toyota	0
3	22	Joey Logano (i)	Team Penske	Ford	0
4	1	Elliott Sadler	JR Motorsports	Chevrolet	7
5	20	Erik Jones (i)	Joe Gibbs Racing	Toyota	0
6	48	Brennan Poole	Chip Ganassi Racing	Chevrolet	5
7	3	Ty Dillon (i)	Richard Childress Racing	Chevrolet	0
8	2	Austin Dillon (i)	Richard Childress Racing	Chevrolet	0
9	9	William Byron (R)	JR Motorsports	Chevrolet	2
10	21	Daniel Hemric (R)	Richard Childress Racing	Chevrolet	1

Stage 3 Laps: 58

Pos	#	Driver	Team	Make	Laps	Led	Status	Pts
1	18	Denny Hamlin (i)	Joe Gibbs Racing	Toyota	148	33	Running	0
2	22	Joey Logano (i)	Team Penske	Ford	148	58	Running	0
3	41	Kevin Harvick (i)	Stewart–Haas Racing	Ford	148	54	Running	0
4	20	Erik Jones (i)	Joe Gibbs Racing	Toyota	148	0	Running	0
5	9	William Byron (R)	JR Motorsports	Chevrolet	148	0	Running	36
6	48	Brennan Poole	Chip Ganassi Racing	Chevrolet	148	0	Running	40
7	3	Ty Dillon (i)	Richard Childress Racing	Chevrolet	148	0	Running	0
8	7	Justin Allgaier	JR Motorsports	Chevrolet	148	0	Running	29
9	00	Cole Custer (R)	Stewart–Haas Racing	Ford	148	0	Running	28
10	2	Austin Dillon (i)	Richard Childress Racing	Chevrolet	148	0	Running	0
11	11	Blake Koch	Kaulig Racing	Chevrolet	148	0	Running	26
12	96	Ben Kennedy (R)	GMS Racing	Chevrolet	148	0	Running	25
13	62	Brendan Gaughan	Richard Childress Racing	Chevrolet	148	0	Running	24
14	4	Ross Chastain	JD Motorsports	Chevrolet	148	0	Running	23
15	16	Ryan Reed	Roush Fenway Racing	Ford	148	0	Running	22
16	42	Tyler Reddick	Chip Ganassi Racing	Chevrolet	148	0	Running	21
17	5	Michael Annett	JR Motorsports	Chevrolet	148	0	Running	20
18	21	Daniel Hemric (R)	Richard Childress Racing	Chevrolet	148	0	Running	21
19	14	J. J. Yeley	TriStar Motorsports	Toyota	148	0	Running	18
20	90	Brandon Brown	Brandonbilt Motorsports	Chevrolet	148	0	Running	17
21	51	Jeremy Clements	Jeremy Clements Racing	Chevrolet	148	0	Running	16
22	39	Ryan Sieg	RSS Racing	Chevrolet	148	0	Running	15
23	33	Brandon Jones	Richard Childress Racing	Chevrolet	148	0	Running	14
24	01	Harrison Rhodes	JD Motorsports	Chevrolet	148	0	Running	13
25	07	Ray Black Jr.	SS-Green Light Racing	Chevrolet	148	0	Running	12
26	0	Garrett Smithley	JD Motorsports	Chevrolet	148	0	Running	11
27	8	B. J. McLeod	B. J. McLeod Motorsports	Chevrolet	148	0	Running	10
28	52	Joey Gase	Jimmy Means Racing	Chevrolet	148	0	Running	9
29	28	Dakoda Armstrong	JGL Racing	Toyota	147	0	Running	8
30	24	Dylan Lupton	JGL Racing	Toyota	147	0	Running	7
31	78	Tommy Joe Martins	B. J. McLeod Motorsports	Chevrolet	145	0	Running	6
32	40	Timmy Hill	MBM Motorsports	Dodge	145	0	Running	5
33	1	Elliott Sadler	JR Motorsports	Chevrolet	142	1	Accident	20
34	23	Spencer Gallagher (R)	GMS Racing	Chevrolet	140	0	Accident	3
35	74	Mike Harmon	Mike Harmon Racing	Dodge	135	0	Running	2
36	99	David Starr	BJMM with SS-Green Light Racing	Chevrolet	132	0	Running	1
37	89	Morgan Shepherd	Shepherd Racing Ventures	Chevrolet	51	2	Fuel Pump	1
38	13	Carl Long	MBM Motorsports	Dodge	29	0	Handling	1
39	93	Jeff Green	RSS Racing	Chevrolet	8	0	Rear Gear	1
40	19	Matt Tifft (R)	Joe Gibbs Racing	Toyota	1	0	Accident	1
Official race results

== Standings after the race ==
Drivers' Championship standings

Pos	Driver	Points
1	Elliott Sadler	858
2	William Byron	767 (-91)
3	Justin Allgaier	739 (–119)
4	Brennan Poole	674 (–184)
5	Daniel Hemric	654 (–204)
6	Cole Custer	590 (-268)
7	Matt Tifft	558 (-300)
8	Blake Koch	511 (-347)
9	Michael Annett	490 (-368)
10	Ryan Reed	487 (-371)
11	Brendan Gaughan	487 (-371)
12	Dakoda Armstrong	467 (-391)
Official driver's standings

- Note: Only the first 12 positions are included for the driver standings.

Previous race: 2017 Johnsonville 180	NASCAR Xfinity Series; 2017 season	Next race: 2017 Virginia 529 College Savings 250
