= 2017 Fitzgerald Glider Kits 300 =

Seventh race of the 2017 NASCAR Xfinity Series

Race details
- Race 7 of 33 in the 2017 NASCAR Xfinity Series
- Date: April 22, 2017
- Official name: 35th Annual Fitzgerald Glider Kits 300
- Location: Bristol, Tennessee, Bristol Motor Speedway
- Course: Permanent racing facility
- Course length: 0.533 miles (0.828 km)
- Distance: 300 laps, 159.9 mi (257.334 km)
- Scheduled distance: 300 laps, 159.9 mi (257.334 km)
- Average speed: 67.738 miles per hour (109.014 km/h)

Pole position
Driver	Kyle Larson	Chip Ganassi Racing
- Time: 14.992

Most laps led
Driver	Kyle Larson	Chip Ganassi Racing
- Laps: 180

Winner
No. 20	Erik Jones	Joe Gibbs Racing

Television in the United States
- Network: Fox Sports 1
- Announcers: Adam Alexander, Michael Waltrip, Kevin Harvick

Radio in the United States
- Radio: Performance Racing Network

The 2017 Fitzgerald Glider Kits 300 was the seventh stock car race of the 2017 NASCAR Xfinity Series season and the 35th iteration of the event. The race was held on Saturday, April 22, 2017, in Bristol, Tennessee at Bristol Motor Speedway, a 0.533 miles (0.858 km) permanent oval-shaped racetrack. The race took the scheduled 300 laps to complete. At race's end, Erik Jones, driving for Joe Gibbs Racing, would take the lead with 20 to go to win his eighth career NASCAR Xfinity Series win and his second of the season. To fill out the podium, Ryan Blaney of Team Penske and Daniel Suárez of Joe Gibbs Racing would finish second and third, respectively.

== Entry list ==
- (R) denotes rookie driver.
- (i) denotes driver who is ineligible for series driver points.

#	Driver	Team	Make
00	Cole Custer (R)	Stewart–Haas Racing	Ford
0	Garrett Smithley	JD Motorsports	Chevrolet
1	Elliott Sadler	JR Motorsports	Chevrolet
01	Harrison Rhodes	JD Motorsports	Chevrolet
2	Austin Dillon (i)	Richard Childress Racing	Chevrolet
3	Ty Dillon (i)	Richard Childress Racing	Chevrolet
4	Ross Chastain	JD Motorsports	Chevrolet
5	Michael Annett	JR Motorsports	Chevrolet
6	Bubba Wallace	Roush Fenway Racing	Ford
7	Justin Allgaier	JR Motorsports	Chevrolet
07	Ray Black Jr.	SS-Green Light Racing	Chevrolet
8	Jeff Green	B. J. McLeod Motorsports	Chevrolet
9	William Byron (R)	JR Motorsports	Chevrolet
11	Blake Koch	Kaulig Racing	Chevrolet
13	Carl Long	MBM Motorsports	Dodge
14	J. J. Yeley	TriStar Motorsports	Toyota
16	Ryan Reed	Roush Fenway Racing	Ford
18	Daniel Suárez (i)	Joe Gibbs Racing	Toyota
19	Matt Tifft (R)	Joe Gibbs Racing	Toyota
20	Erik Jones (i)	Joe Gibbs Racing	Toyota
21	Daniel Hemric (R)	Richard Childress Racing	Chevrolet
22	Ryan Blaney (i)	Team Penske	Ford
23	Spencer Gallagher (R)	GMS Racing	Chevrolet
24	Jeb Burton	JGL Racing	Toyota
28	Dakoda Armstrong	JGL Racing	Toyota
33	Brandon Jones	Richard Childress Racing	Chevrolet
39	Ryan Sieg	RSS Racing	Chevrolet
40	Timmy Hill	MBM Motorsports	Dodge
42	Kyle Larson (i)	Chip Ganassi Racing	Chevrolet
45	Tommy Joe Martins*	Martins Motorsports	Chevrolet
46	Quin Houff	Precision Performance Motorsports	Chevrolet
48	Brennan Poole	Chip Ganassi Racing	Chevrolet
51	Jeremy Clements	Jeremy Clements Racing	Chevrolet
52	Joey Gase	Jimmy Means Racing	Chevrolet
62	Brendan Gaughan	Richard Childress Racing	Chevrolet
74	Mike Harmon	Mike Harmon Racing	Dodge
78	B. J. McLeod	B. J. McLeod Motorsports	Chevrolet
89	Morgan Shepherd	Shepherd Racing Ventures	Chevrolet
90	Josh Williams	King Autosport	Chevrolet
93	Jordan Anderson (i)	RSS Racing	Chevrolet
97	Stephen Leicht*	Obaika Racing	Chevrolet
99	David Starr	B. J. McLeod Motorsports with SS-Green Light Racing	Chevrolet
Official entry list

*Withdrew due to concerns of rain.

== Practice ==
The only 55-minute practice session was held on Friday, April 21, at 2:00 PM EST. Justin Allgaier of JR Motorsports set the fastest time in the session with a time of 15.422 and an average speed of 124.420 miles per hour (200.235 km/h).

Pos	#	Driver	Team	Make	Time	Speed
1	7	Justin Allgaier	JR Motorsports	Chevrolet	15.422	124.420
2	20	Erik Jones (i)	Joe Gibbs Racing	Toyota	15.509	123.722
3	42	Kyle Larson (i)	Chip Ganassi Racing	Chevrolet	15.525	123.594
Full practice results

== Qualifying ==
Qualifying was held on Saturday, April 22, at 9:35 AM EST. Since Bristol Motor Speedway is under 2 miles (3.2 km), the qualifying system was a multi-car system that included three rounds. The first round was 15 minutes, where every driver would be able to set a lap. Then, the second round would consist of the fastest 24 cars from Round 1, and drivers would have 10 minutes to set a lap. Round 3 consisted of the fastest 12 drivers from Round 2, and they would have 5 minutes to set a time. Whoever was fastest in Round 3 would win the pole.

Kyle Larson of Chip Ganassi Racing would win the pole after advancing from both preliminary rounds and setting the fastest lap in Round 3, with a time of 14.992 and an average speed of 127.988 miles per hour (205.977 km/h).

No drivers would fail to qualify.

=== Full qualifying results ===
Pos	#	Driver	Team	Make	Time (R1)	Speed (R1)	Time (R2)	Speed (R2)	Time (R3)	Speed (R3)
1	42	Kyle Larson (i)	Chip Ganassi Racing	Chevrolet	15.346	125.036	15.084	127.208	14.992	127.988
2	2	Austin Dillon (i)	Richard Childress Racing	Chevrolet	15.268	125.675	15.142	126.720	15.043	127.554
3	00	Cole Custer (R)	Stewart–Haas Racing	Ford	15.172	126.470	15.182	126.387	15.074	127.292
4	20	Erik Jones (i)	Joe Gibbs Racing	Toyota	15.249	125.831	15.188	126.337	15.104	127.039
5	7	Justin Allgaier	JR Motorsports	Chevrolet	15.237	125.930	15.079	127.250	15.128	126.838
6	3	Ty Dillon (i)	Richard Childress Racing	Chevrolet	15.429	124.363	15.245	125.864	15.138	126.754
7	19	Matt Tifft (R)	Joe Gibbs Racing	Toyota	15.399	124.605	15.212	126.137	15.158	126.587
8	21	Daniel Hemric (R)	Richard Childress Racing	Chevrolet	15.259	125.749	15.197	126.262	15.208	126.170
9	22	Ryan Blaney (i)	Team Penske	Ford	15.442	124.259	15.198	126.253	15.222	126.054
10	18	Daniel Suárez (i)	Joe Gibbs Racing	Toyota	15.398	124.614	15.231	125.980	15.237	125.930
11	4	Ross Chastain	JD Motorsports	Chevrolet	15.200	126.237	15.254	125.790	15.291	125.486
12	62	Brendan Gaughan	Richard Childress Racing	Chevrolet	15.512	123.698	15.202	126.220	15.294	125.461
Eliminated in Round 1
13	48	Brennan Poole	Chip Ganassi Racing	Chevrolet	15.405	124.557	15.307	125.354	—	—
14	6	Bubba Wallace	Roush Fenway Racing	Ford	15.471	124.026	15.333	125.142	—	—
15	51	Jeremy Clements	Jeremy Clements Racing	Chevrolet	15.375	124.800	15.338	125.101	—	—
16	11	Blake Koch	Kaulig Racing	Chevrolet	15.567	123.261	15.347	125.028	—	—
17	1	Elliott Sadler	JR Motorsports	Chevrolet	15.458	124.130	15.356	124.954	—	—
18	33	Brandon Jones	Richard Childress Racing	Chevrolet	15.458	124.130	15.376	124.792	—	—
19	9	William Byron (R)	JR Motorsports	Chevrolet	15.333	125.142	15.441	124.267	—	—
20	39	Ryan Sieg	RSS Racing	Chevrolet	15.530	123.554	15.476	123.986	—	—
21	46	Quin Houff	Precision Performance Motorsports	Chevrolet	15.535	123.515	15.509	123.722	—	—
22	24	Jeb Burton	JGL Racing	Toyota	15.572	123.221	15.527	123.578	—	—
23	23	Spencer Gallagher (R)	GMS Racing	Chevrolet	15.515	123.674	15.546	123.427	—	—
24	16	Ryan Reed	Roush Fenway Racing	Ford	15.556	123.348	15.556	123.348	—	—
Eliminated in Round 2
25	07	Ray Black Jr.	SS-Green Light Racing	Chevrolet	15.594	123.047	—	—	—	—
26	78	B. J. McLeod	B. J. McLeod Motorsports	Chevrolet	15.646	122.638	—	—	—	—
27	99	David Starr	BJMM with SS-Green Light Racing	Chevrolet	15.658	122.544	—	—	—	—
28	5	Michael Annett	JR Motorsports	Chevrolet	15.677	122.396	—	—	—	—
29	01	Harrison Rhodes	JD Motorsports	Chevrolet	15.761	121.744	—	—	—	—
30	14	J. J. Yeley	TriStar Motorsports	Toyota	15.819	121.297	—	—	—	—
31	28	Dakoda Armstrong	JGL Racing	Toyota	15.897	120.702	—	—	—	—
32	90	Josh Williams	King Autosport	Chevrolet	15.902	120.664	—	—	—	—
33	93	Jordan Anderson (i)	RSS Racing	Chevrolet	15.903	120.656	—	—	—	—
Qualified by owner's points
34	40	Timmy Hill	MBM Motorsports	Dodge	15.930	120.452	—	—	—	—
35	0	Garrett Smithley	JD Motorsports	Chevrolet	15.974	120.120	—	—	—	—
36	13	Carl Long	MBM Motorsports	Dodge	16.097	119.202	—	—	—	—
37	8	Jeff Green	B. J. McLeod Motorsports	Chevrolet	16.135	118.922	—	—	—	—
38	52	Joey Gase	Jimmy Means	Chevrolet	16.462	116.559	—	—	—	—
39	89	Morgan Shepherd	Shepherd Racing Ventures	Chevrolet	16.532	116.066	—	—	—	—
40	74	Mike Harmon	Mike Harmon Racing	Dodge	18.355	104.538	—	—	—	—
Withdrew
WD	45	Tommy Joe Martins	Martins Motorsports	Chevrolet	—	—	—	—	—	—
WD	97	Stephen Leicht	Obaika Racing	Chevrolet	—	—	—	—	—	—
Official qualifying results
Official starting lineup

== Race results ==
Stage 1 Laps: 85

Pos	#	Driver	Team	Make	Pts
1	42	Kyle Larson (i)	Chip Ganassi Racing	Chevrolet	0
2	22	Ryan Blaney (i)	Team Penske	Ford	0
3	20	Erik Jones (i)	Joe Gibbs Racing	Toyota	0
4	3	Ty Dillon (i)	Richard Childress Racing	Chevrolet	0
5	18	Daniel Suárez (i)	Joe Gibbs Racing	Toyota	0
6	00	Cole Custer (R)	Stewart–Haas Racing	Ford	5
7	2	Austin Dillon (i)	Richard Childress Racing	Chevrolet	0
8	7	Justin Allgaier	JR Motorsports	Chevrolet	3
9	21	Daniel Hemric (R)	Richard Childress Racing	Chevrolet	2
10	1	Elliott Sadler	JR Motorsports	Chevrolet	1

Stage 2 Laps: 85

Pos	#	Driver	Team	Make	Pts
1	21	Daniel Hemric (R)	Richard Childress Racing	Chevrolet	10
2	22	Ryan Blaney (i)	Team Penske	Ford	0
3	62	Brendan Gaughan	Richard Childress Racing	Chevrolet	8
4	18	Daniel Suárez (i)	Joe Gibbs Racing	Toyota	0
5	11	Blake Koch	Kaulig Racing	Chevrolet	6
6	42	Kyle Larson (i)	Chip Ganassi Racing	Chevrolet	0
7	2	Austin Dillon (i)	Richard Childress Racing	Chevrolet	0
8	33	Brandon Jones	Richard Childress Racing	Chevrolet	3
9	00	Cole Custer (R)	Stewart–Haas Racing	Ford	2
10	1	Elliott Sadler	JR Motorsports	Chevrolet	1

Stage 3 Laps: 130

Pos	#	Driver	Team	Make	Laps	Led	Status	Pts
1	20	Erik Jones (i)	Joe Gibbs Racing	Toyota	300	27	running	0
2	22	Ryan Blaney (i)	Team Penske	Ford	300	61	running	0
3	18	Daniel Suárez (i)	Joe Gibbs Racing	Toyota	300	18	running	0
4	1	Elliott Sadler	JR Motorsports	Chevrolet	300	0	running	35
5	21	Daniel Hemric (R)	Richard Childress Racing	Chevrolet	300	8	running	44
6	3	Ty Dillon (i)	Richard Childress Racing	Chevrolet	300	0	running	0
7	42	Kyle Larson (i)	Chip Ganassi Racing	Chevrolet	300	180	running	0
8	48	Brennan Poole	Chip Ganassi Racing	Chevrolet	300	0	running	29
9	11	Blake Koch	Kaulig Racing	Chevrolet	300	0	running	34
10	5	Michael Annett	JR Motorsports	Chevrolet	300	0	running	27
11	14	J. J. Yeley	TriStar Motorsports	Toyota	300	0	running	26
12	9	William Byron (R)	JR Motorsports	Chevrolet	300	0	running	25
13	2	Austin Dillon (i)	Richard Childress Racing	Chevrolet	300	1	running	0
14	7	Justin Allgaier	JR Motorsports	Chevrolet	300	0	running	26
15	46	Quin Houff	Precision Performance Motorsports	Chevrolet	300	0	running	22
16	19	Matt Tifft (R)	Joe Gibbs Racing	Toyota	300	0	running	21
17	51	Jeremy Clements	Jeremy Clements Racing	Chevrolet	299	0	running	20
18	23	Spencer Gallagher (R)	GMS Racing	Chevrolet	298	0	running	19
19	28	Dakoda Armstrong	JGL Racing	Toyota	298	0	running	18
20	33	Brandon Jones	Richard Childress Racing	Chevrolet	297	5	running	20
21	39	Ryan Sieg	RSS Racing	Chevrolet	295	0	running	16
22	90	Josh Williams	King Autosport	Chevrolet	295	0	running	15
23	01	Harrison Rhodes	JD Motorsports	Chevrolet	294	0	running	14
24	40	Timmy Hill	MBM Motorsports	Dodge	294	0	running	13
25	8	Jeff Green	B. J. McLeod Motorsports	Chevrolet	294	0	running	12
26	24	Jeb Burton	JGL Racing	Toyota	293	0	running	11
27	13	Carl Long	MBM Motorsports	Dodge	293	0	running	10
28	52	Joey Gase	Jimmy Means	Chevrolet	292	0	running	9
29	78	B. J. McLeod	B. J. McLeod Motorsports	Chevrolet	292	0	running	8
30	74	Mike Harmon	Mike Harmon Racing	Dodge	281	0	running	7
31	4	Ross Chastain	JD Motorsports	Chevrolet	268	0	crash	6
32	00	Cole Custer (R)	Stewart–Haas Racing	Ford	262	0	crash	12
33	6	Bubba Wallace	Roush Fenway Racing	Ford	258	0	crash	4
34	0	Garrett Smithley	JD Motorsports	Chevrolet	253	0	crash	3
35	62	Brendan Gaughan	Richard Childress Racing	Chevrolet	243	0	crash	10
36	99	David Starr	BJMM with SS-Green Light Racing	Chevrolet	227	0	crash	1
37	07	Ray Black Jr.	SS-Green Light Racing	Chevrolet	213	0	crash	1
38	16	Ryan Reed	Roush Fenway Racing	Ford	79	0	crash	1
39	89	Morgan Shepherd	Shepherd Racing Ventures	Chevrolet	15	0	overheating	1
40	93	Jordan Anderson (i)	RSS Racing	Chevrolet	13	0	electrical	0
Official race results

== Standings after the race ==
Drivers' Championship standings

Pos	Driver	Points
1	Elliott Sadler	260
2	William Byron	244 (–16)
3	Justin Allgaier	200 (–60)
4	Ryan Reed	184 (–76)
5	Daniel Hemric	180 (–80)
6	Bubba Wallace	180 (–80)
7	Blake Koch	164 (–96)
8	Brennan Poole	163 (–97)
9	Matt Tifft	160 (–100)
10	Michael Annett	157 (–103)
11	Dakoda Armstrong	139 (–121)
12	Cole Custer	130 (–130)
Official driver's standings

- Note: Only the first 12 positions are included for the driver standings.

Previous race: 2017 My Bariatric Solutions 300	NASCAR Xfinity Series; 2017 season	Next race: 2017 ToyotaCare 250
