= Ryan Reed =

American racing driver (born 1993)

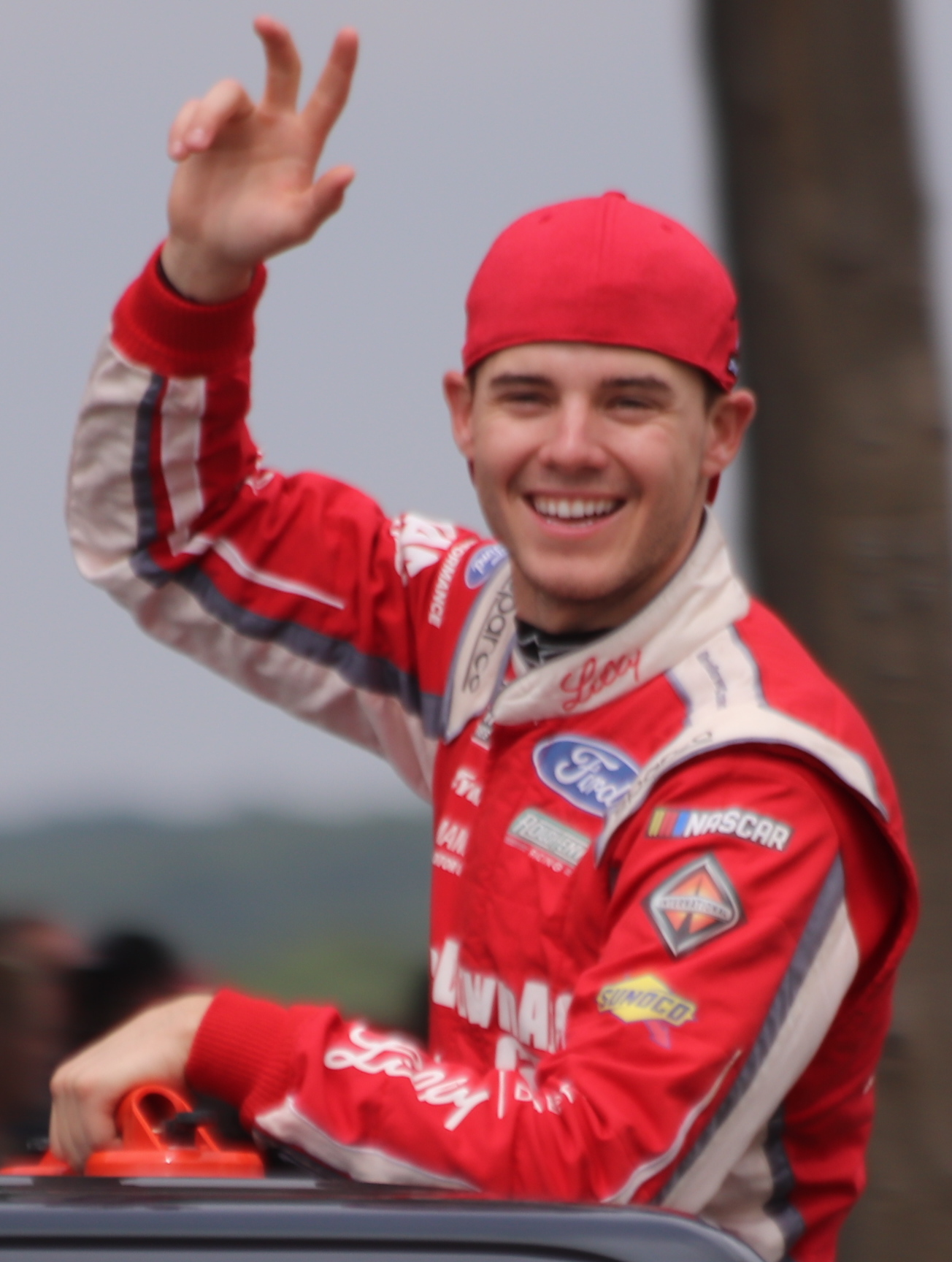
- Reed at Road America in 2018
- Born: Ryan Austin Payton Reed; August 12, 1993 (age 33); Bakersfield, California, U.S.

NASCAR Cup Series career
- 1 race run over 1 year
- 2016 position: 55th
- Best finish: 55th (2016)
- First race: 2016 Hellmann's 500 (Talladega)
Wins	Top tens	Poles
0	0	0

NASCAR O'Reilly Auto Parts Series career
- 172 races run over 7 years
- 2023 position: 59th
- Best finish: 6th (2016)
- First race: 2013 ToyotaCare 250 (Richmond)
- Last race: 2023 Alsco Uniforms 302 (Las Vegas)
- First win: 2015 Alert Today Florida 300 (Daytona)
- Last win: 2017 PowerShares QQQ 300 (Daytona)
Wins	Top tens	Poles
2	27	0

NASCAR FedEx Freight Truck Series career
- 6 races run over 4 years
- 2024 position: 48th
- Best finish: 48th (2024)
- First race: 2012 Smith's 350 (Las Vegas)
- Last race: 2024 Love's RV Stop 225 (Talladega)
Wins	Top tens	Poles
0	2	0

ARCA Menards Series career
- 18 races run over 3 years
- Best finish: 14th (2012)
- First race: 2012 Lucas Oil Slick Mist 200 (Daytona)
- Last race: 2016 General Tire #AnywhereIsPossible 200 (Pocono)
- First win: 2015 Scott 150 (Chicagoland)
- Last win: 2015 Crosley Brands 150 (Kentucky)
Wins	Top tens	Poles
2	9	0

ARCA Menards Series East career
- 4 races run over 2 years
- Best finish: 41st (2011)
- First race: 2011 Slack Auto Parts 150 (Jefferson)
- Last race: 2014 Bully Hill Vineyards 125 (Watkins Glen)
Wins	Top tens	Poles
0	1	0

ARCA Menards Series West career
- 1 race run over 1 year
- Best finish: 74th (2013)
- First race: 2013 Carneros 200 (Sonoma)
Wins	Top tens	Poles
0	0	0
- Statistics up to date as of November 8, 2024.

Ryan Austin Payton Reed (born August 12, 1993) is an American professional stock car racing driver and driver coach. He last competed part-time in the NASCAR Craftsman Truck Series, driving the No. 91 Chevrolet Silverado RST for McAnally–Hilgemann Racing. After Roush Fenway Racing closed down their Xfinity Series team after the 2018 season, Reed has mostly been without a ride in NASCAR since then, bouncing from teams like MBM Motorsports to GMS Racing. And while in that situation, Reed has worked since 2020 as the driver coach for Jack Wood.

== Racing career ==
=== Early career ===
Reed began racing at the age of four, and in 2009 won the Legends Division championship at Irwindale Speedway. In 2010, he entered the Super Late Model Division, became the track's youngest Super Late Model winner, and won Rookie of the Year. At the age of seventeen, Reed moved from Bakersfield, California to Mooresville, North Carolina to focus on racing. In 2011, Reed ran in various series, including the Pro Allstars Series, Whelen All-American Series, and the K&N Pro Series East. During the year, Reed was expected to run a Late Model as a development driver with Kyle Busch Motorsports until his diagnosis with type 1 diabetes. In December 2011, Reed was announced as a part-time driver in the ARCA Racing Series for Venturini Motorsports. Reed ran 14 events in the team's No. 15, recording six top-tens and 14th-place points finish. In 2012, Reed made his NASCAR Camping World Truck Series debut at Las Vegas Motor Speedway in the No. 5 for Wauters Motorsports, finishing seventeenth.

=== 2013–2018: Roush Fenway Racing ===
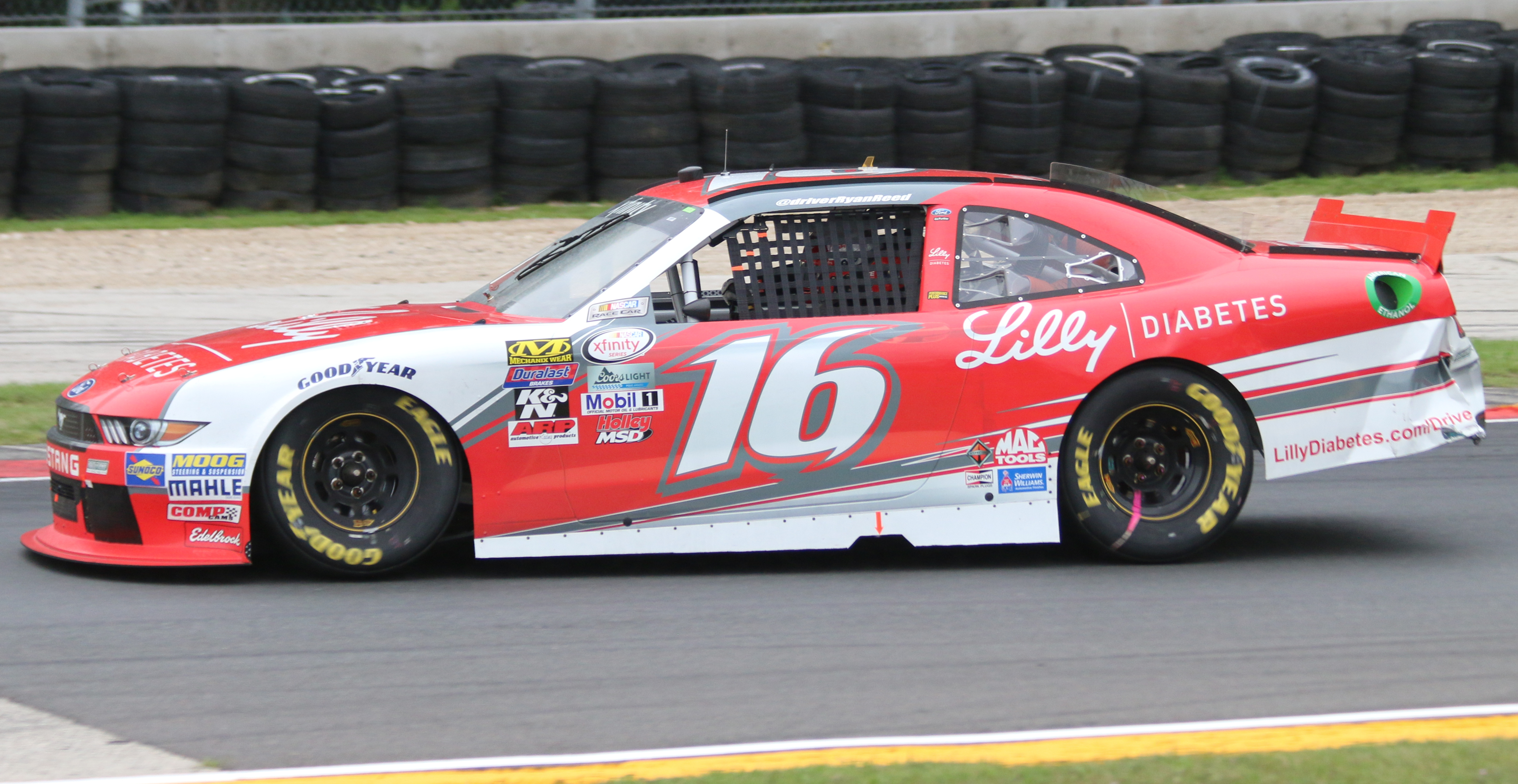
Reed's No. 16 at Road America in 2016

In 2013, Reed joined Roush Fenway Racing in the Nationwide Series, driving No. 16 Ford Mustang, and running various races during the 2013 season with Eli Lilly and Company and the American Diabetes Association's Drive to Stop Diabetes campaign as a sponsor. Reed made his Nationwide debut in the ToyotaCare 250 at Richmond International Raceway, finishing sixteenth. Reed ran six races during the season, recording his first top-ten after finishing ninth in the Virginia 529 College Savings 250 at Richmond. On October 11, 2013, Roush Fenway Racing announced that Reed would run the No. 16 in the 2014 NASCAR Nationwide Series season full-time, with Lilly Diabetes and the ADA sponsoring full-time. The sponsorship has been reported to be worth $5 million annually.

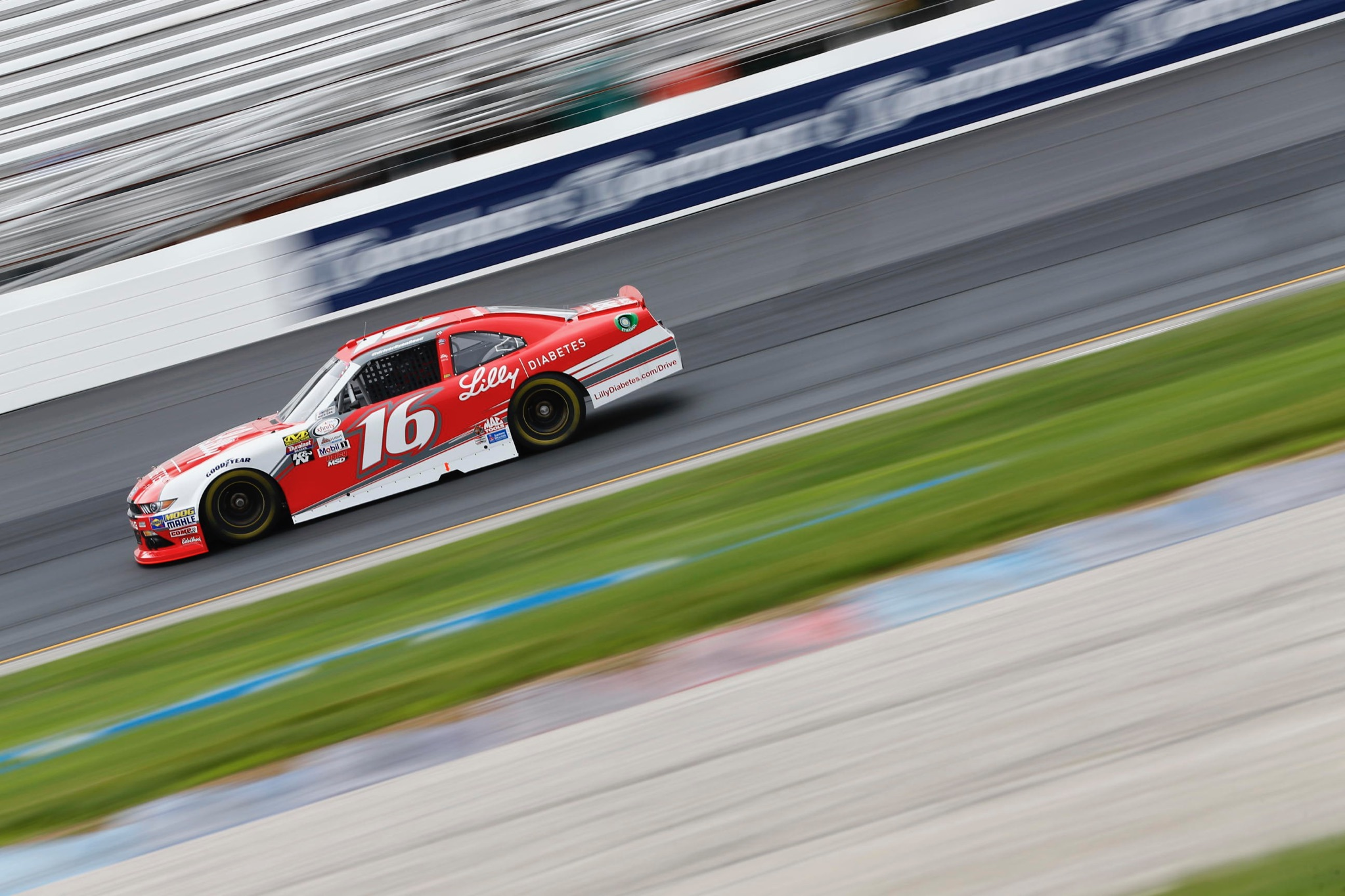
Reed during practice at New Hampshire Motor Speedway in 2017

On February 21, 2015, Reed won his first Xfinity Series race in the season-opening 2015 Alert Today Florida 300 at Daytona International Speedway, pushed by teammate Chris Buescher past leader Brad Keselowski on the final lap of the race. On June 20, 2015, Reed won his first career ARCA Racing Series race in the Scott 150 at Chicagoland Speedway driving for Lira Motorsports. Reed led the final seventy laps of the one-hundred lap race, capturing the Valvoline Lap Leader award. It was the first ARCA Series win for Lira Motorsports. Reed ended the 2015 Xfinity season a distant tenth in points, the Daytona victory being his only top-ten of the year.

Reed ran the full Xfinity season in 2016. In early 2016, Reed attempted the Truck race at Daytona driving the No. 58 Ford F-150 for Lira Motorsports, but failed to qualify. In 2016, Reed finished with seven top-tens, increasing his total top-ten count from three to ten. Reed finished sixth in points.

On September 28, 2016, it was announced by RFR that Reed would attempt his Sprint Cup Series debut at Talladega in the Hellmann's 500, driving the No. 99 Ford Fusion. Reed became the first driver in NASCAR to manage his diabetes and race in the Sprint Cup Series. After starting 18th, he finished 26th.

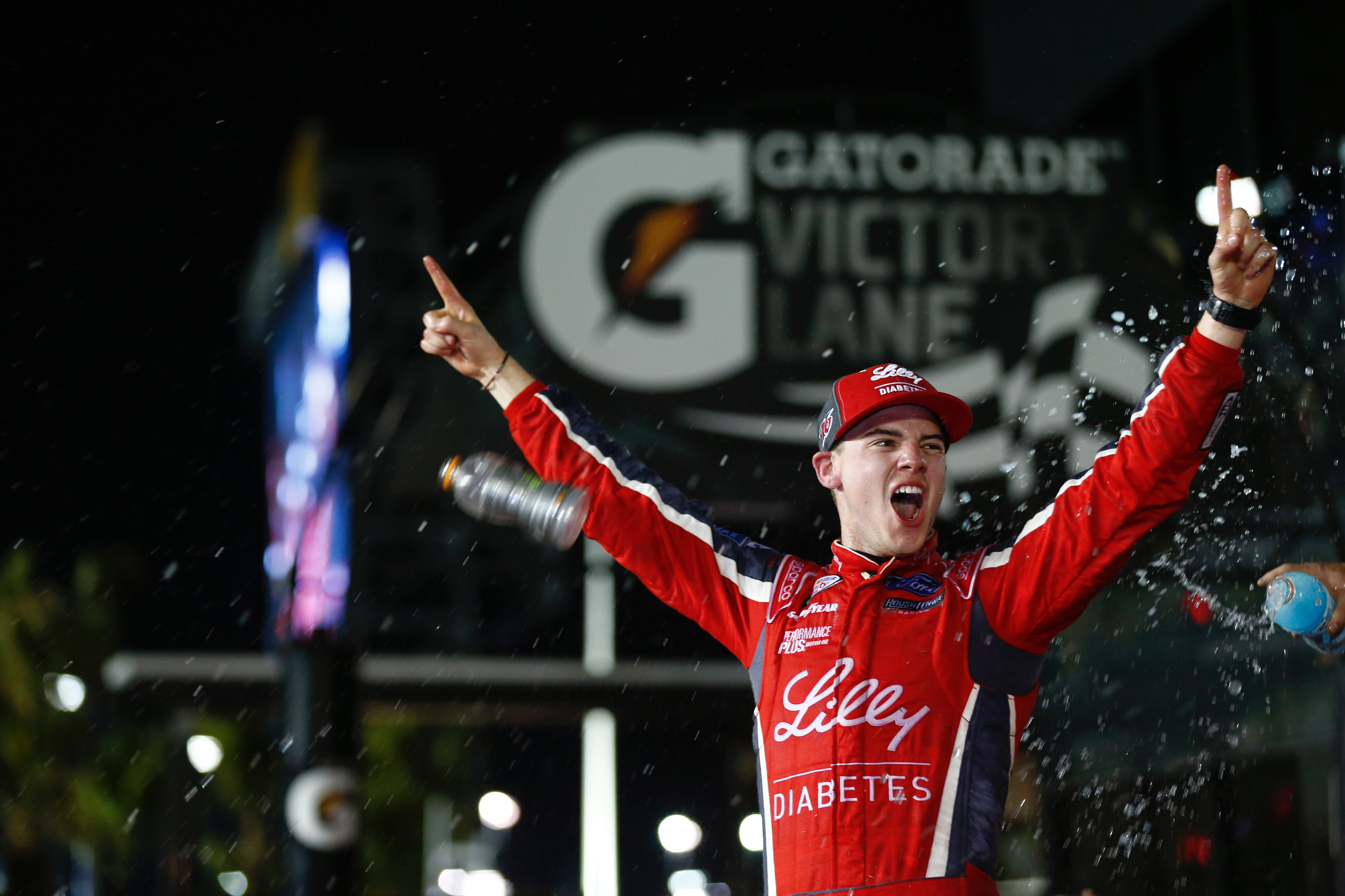
Reed celebrates his Daytona Xfinity win in 2017, his second at the track.

On February 25, 2017, Reed won the Xfinity Series' season-opening race, the PowerShares QQQ 300, at Daytona. In his second career Xfinity Series victory, Reed survived a race that eliminated multiple drivers in wrecks, with only ten cars of the field of forty having little to no damage. At the June Michigan race weekend, Reed substituted for Trevor Bayne in the No. 6 Cup car during practice as Bayne's wife, Ashton, was expecting their second child.

On October 15, 2018, it was announced that longtime sponsor Lilly Diabetes would be pulling out of the sport, with Roush eventually shutting down their entire Xfinity program at season's end due to lack of sponsorship.

=== 2019–present ===
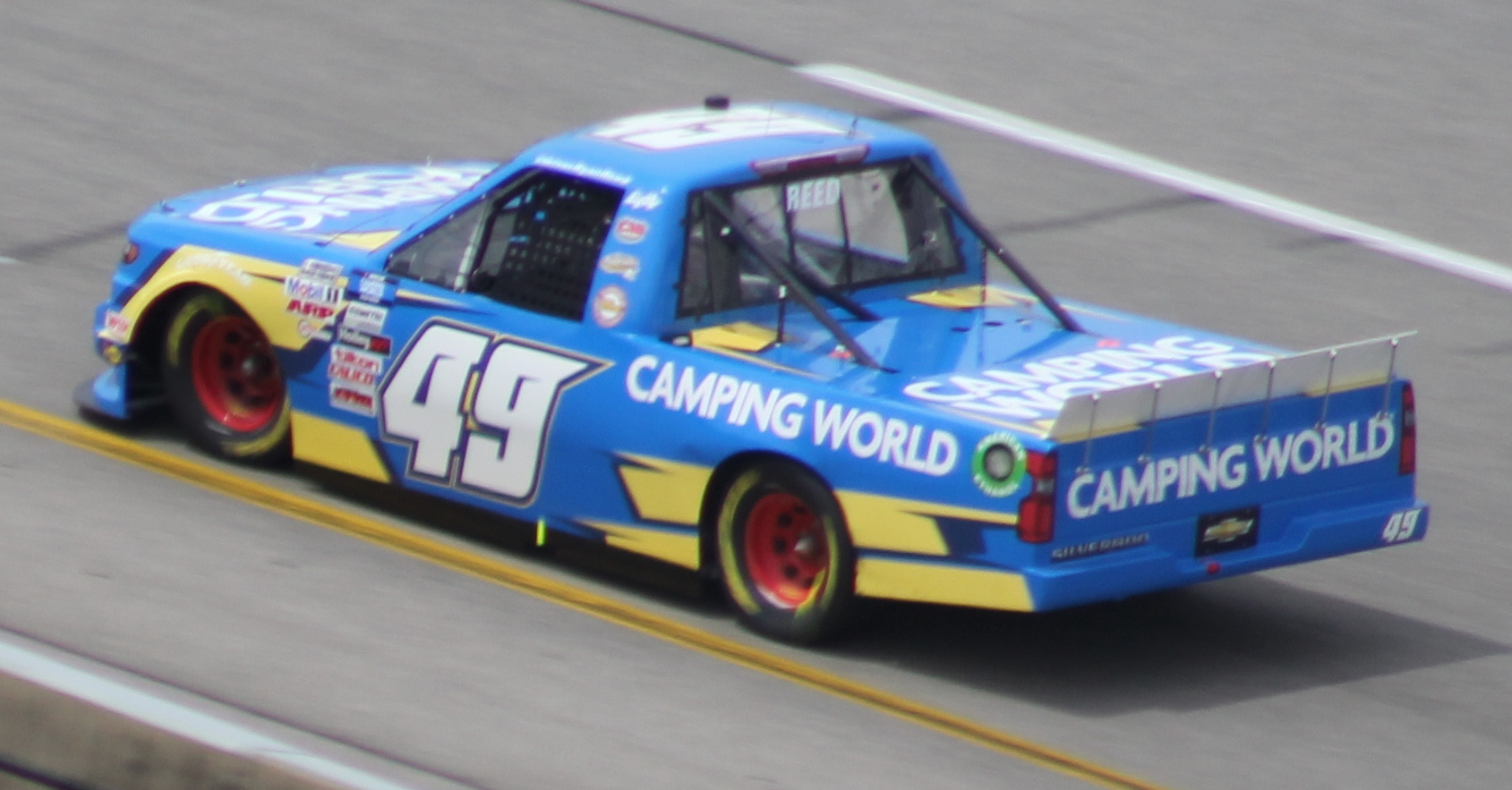
Reed's No. 49 truck at Richmond Raceway in 2021

After starting the season without a ride, Reed joined DGR-Crosley's No. 17 team in the Truck Series for the 2019 spring race at Las Vegas, where he finished ninth. However, he did not end up attempting any more races with them or any other team in any NASCAR series for the rest of the year. However, he returned to compete in some late model races on occasion, returning to the Wauters Motorsports No. 5 team. In 2020, Reed was without a ride again. For the time being, he was announced to serve as a driver coach for Velocity Racing in the ARCA Menards Series West with their No. 78 team and driver Jack Wood, who is also from California like Reed. In 2021, Reed returned to the driver's seat for the first time in two years when he competed in the Truck Series race at Richmond in the No. 49 for CMI Motorsports. Team owner Ray Ciccarelli was originally going to drive the truck in the race, but after the team did qualify for it based on which other teams entered the race as part of the lack of qualifying due to COVID-19, Ciccarelli stepped aside in favor of Reed in an effort to get the team passed Norm Benning's No. 6 in the owner points, which would likely lock the No. 49 into future races they entered. On May 3, 2021, it was announced that Reed would join GMS Racing to drive their No. 24 at Darlington, after that truck's normal driver, Raphaël Lessard, struggled to find sponsorship and as a result was taken out of the ride.

In 2023, it was revealed on the entry list for the Las Vegas Motor Speedway event in October that Reed would attempt to make his return to the Xfinity Series, driving the No. 66 Chevrolet for MBM Motorsports in collaboration with Alpha Prime Racing.

== Personal life ==
Reed's father, Mark Reed, is a former NASCAR driver who has two K&N West wins and two Cup starts. Reed is the youngest of four children.

In February 2011, Reed was diagnosed with type 1 diabetes, and doctors stated he would be unable to race again. As a result, Reed became a diabetes advocate, and established the foundation Ryan's Mission. Reed installed a drink system in his car, along with a blood glucose monitor on the car's dashboard which displays data from a wireless device attached to Reed's stomach. During races, Reed would monitor his blood glucose levels, while Roush engine tuner Craig Herrmann would inject Reed with insulin during pit stops. Reed is one of three drivers in a national racing series with type 1 diabetes, along with IndyCar Series drivers Charlie Kimball and Conor Daly.

== Motorsports career results ==
=== Career summary ===
Season	Series	Team	Races	Wins	Top 5s	Top 10s	Poles	Points	Position
2009	Langers Juice S-2 Sportsman Series	Tim Huddleston	5	0	4	5	2	228	6th
2011	NASCAR K&N Pro Series East	Mark Reed	3	0	0	0	0	258	41st
2012	ARCA Racing Series	Venturini Motorsports	14	0	1	6	0	2720	14th
2012	NASCAR Camping World Truck Series	Wauters Motorsports	1	0	0	0	0	27	61st
2013	NASCAR Nationwide Series	Roush Fenway Racing	6	0	0	1	0	171	37th
2013	NASCAR K&N Pro Series West	Mark Reed	1	0	0	0	0	10	74th
2014	NASCAR Nationwide Series	Roush Fenway Racing	33	0	1	1	0	889	9th
2014	NASCAR K&N Pro Series East	Bill McAnally Racing	1	0	0	1	0	37	50th
2015	NASCAR Xfinity Series	Roush Fenway Racing	33	1	1	1	0	902	10th
2015	ARCA Racing Series	Lira Motorsports	3	2	3	3	0	690	34th
2016	NASCAR Xfinity Series	Roush Fenway Racing	33	0	1	7	0	2205	6th
2016	NASCAR Sprint Cup Series	Roush Fenway Racing	1	0	0	0	0	0	55th
2016	ARCA Racing Series	Lira Motorsports	1	0	0	0	0	170	108th
2017	NASCAR Xfinity Series	Roush Fenway Racing	33	1	2	7	0	2161	8th
2018	NASCAR Xfinity Series	Roush Fenway Racing	33	0	2	10	0	2170	11th
2019	NASCAR Gander Outdoors Truck Series	DGR-Crosley	1	0	0	1	0	31	59th
2021	NASCAR Camping World Truck Series	CMI Motorsports; GMS Racing	3	0	0	0	0	34	56th
2023	NASCAR Xfinity Series	MBM Motorsports	1	0	0	0	0	17	59th
2024	NASCAR Craftsman Truck Series	McAnally–Hilgemann Racing	1	0	0	1	0	30	48th

=== NASCAR ===
(key) (Bold – Pole position awarded by qualifying time. Italics – Pole position earned by points standings or practice time. * – Most laps led.)

==== Sprint Cup Series ====
NASCAR Sprint Cup Series results
Year	Team	No.	Make	1	2	3	4	5	6	7	8	9	10	11	12	13	14	15	16	17	18	19	20	21	22	23	24	25	26	27	28	29	30	31	32	33	34	35	36	NSCC	Pts	Ref
2016	Roush Fenway Racing	99	Ford	DAY	ATL	LVS	PHO	CAL	MAR	TEX	BRI	RCH	TAL	KAN	DOV	CLT	POC	MCH	SON	DAY	KEN	NHA	IND	POC	GLN	BRI	MCH	DAR	RCH	CHI	NHA	DOV	CLT	KAN	TAL; 26	MAR	TEX	PHO	HOM	55th	0^{1}	

==== Xfinity Series ====
NASCAR Xfinity Series results
Year	Team	No.	Make	1	2	3	4	5	6	7	8	9	10	11	12	13	14	15	16	17	18	19	20	21	22	23	24	25	26	27	28	29	30	31	32	33	NXSC	Pts	Ref
2013	Roush Fenway Racing	16	Ford	DAY	PHO	LVS	BRI	CAL	TEX	RCH; 16	TAL	DAR	CLT	DOV	IOW	MCH	ROA	KEN	DAY	NHA	CHI	IND	IOW	GLN	MOH	BRI; 26	ATL	RCH; 9	CHI	KEN	DOV	KAN	CLT; 14	TEX	PHO; 15	HOM; 13	37th	171	
2014	Roush Fenway Racing	16	Ford	DAY; 18	PHO; 22	LVS; 15	BRI; 31	CAL; 17	TEX; 20	DAR; 13	RCH; 12	TAL; 24	IOW; 16	CLT; 14	DOV; 27	MCH; 11	ROA; 21	KEN; 17	DAY; 4	NHA; 11	CHI; 15	IND; 20	IOW; 15	GLN; 12	MOH; 12	BRI; 14	ATL; 18	RCH; 16	CHI; 24	KEN; 11	DOV; 24	KAN; 12	CLT; 15	TEX; 17	PHO; 19	HOM; 27	9th	889	
2015	Roush Fenway Racing	16	Ford	DAY; 1	ATL; 16	LVS; 15	PHO; 13	CAL; 11	TEX; 15	BRI; 21	RCH; 21	TAL; 32	IOW; 12	CLT; 12	DOV; 11	MCH; 19	CHI; 12	DAY; 13	KEN; 14	NHA; 13	IND; 20	IOW; 19	GLN; 30	MOH; 22	BRI; 25	ROA; 19	DAR; 23	RCH; 13	CHI; 11	KEN; 25	DOV; 14	CLT; 11	KAN; 17	TEX; 15	PHO; 23	HOM; 17	10th	902	
2016	Roush Fenway Racing	16	Ford	DAY; 16	ATL; 15	LVS; 13	PHO; 14	CAL; 14	TEX; 14	BRI; 21	RCH; 11	TAL; 31	DOV; 18	CLT; 19	POC; 33	MCH; 14	IOW; 11	DAY; 6	KEN; 29	NHA; 14	IND; 13	IOW; 10	GLN; 9	MOH; 11	BRI; 35	ROA; 5	DAR; 13	RCH; 11	CHI; 32	KEN; 7	DOV; 10	CLT; 15	KAN; 16	TEX; 12	PHO; 6	HOM; 16	6th	2205	
2017	Roush Fenway Racing	16	Ford	DAY; 1	ATL; 18	LVS; 9	PHO; 11	CAL; 15	TEX; 11	BRI; 38	RCH; 23	TAL; 29	CLT; 11	DOV; 5	POC; 14	MCH; 8	IOW; 19	DAY; 31	KEN; 36	NHA; 14	IND; 6	IOW; 21	GLN; 15	MOH; 33	BRI; 37	ROA; 35	DAR; 15	RCH; 12	CHI; 17	KEN; 10	DOV; 16	CLT; 12	KAN; 10	TEX; 23	PHO; 14	HOM; 20	8th	2161	
2018	Roush Fenway Racing	16	Ford	DAY; 3	ATL; 10	LVS; 19	PHO; 18	CAL; 17	TEX; 14	BRI; 18	RCH; 9	TAL; 22	DOV; 19	CLT; 29	POC; 13	MCH; 4	IOW; 17	CHI; 32	DAY; 26	KEN; 8	NHA; 12	IOW; 7	GLN; 8	MOH; 10	BRI; 17	ROA; 39	DAR; 13	IND; 11	LVS; 35	RCH; 10	ROV; 11	DOV; 16	KAN; 7	TEX; 29	PHO; 12	HOM; 12	11th	2170	
2023	MBM Motorsports	66	Chevy	DAY	CAL	LVS	PHO	ATL	COA	RCH	MAR	TAL	DOV	DAR	CLT	PIR	SON	NSH	CSC	ATL	NHA	POC	ROA	MCH	IRC	GLN	DAY	DAR	KAN	BRI	TEX	ROV	LVS; 20	HOM	MAR	PHO	59th	17	

==== Craftsman Truck Series ====
NASCAR Craftsman Truck Series results
Year	Team	No.	Make	1	2	3	4	5	6	7	8	9	10	11	12	13	14	15	16	17	18	19	20	21	22	23	NCTC	Pts	Ref
2012	Wauters Motorsports	5	Ford	DAY	MAR	CAR	KAN	CLT	DOV	TEX	KEN	IOW	CHI	POC	MCH	BRI	ATL	IOW	KEN	LVS; 17	TAL	MAR	TEX	PHO	HOM		61st	27	
2016	Lira Motorsports	58	Ford	DAY; DNQ	ATL	MAR	KAN	DOV	CLT	TEX	IOW	GTW	KEN	ELD	POC	BRI	MCH	MSP	CHI	NHA	LVS	TAL	MAR	TEX	PHO	HOM	115th	0^{1}	
2019	DGR-Crosley	17	Toyota	DAY	ATL	LVS; 9	MAR	TEX	DOV	KAN	CLT	TEX	IOW	GTW	CHI	KEN	POC	ELD	MCH	BRI	MSP	LVS	TAL	MAR	PHO	HOM	59th	31	
2021	CMI Motorsports	49	Chevy	DAY	DRC	LVS	ATL	BRD	RCH; 29																		56th	34	
2021	CMI Motorsports	49	Toyota							KAN; 40																	56th	34	
2021	GMS Racing	24	Chevy								DAR; 12	COA	CLT	TEX	NSH	POC	KNX	GLN	GTW	DAR	BRI	LVS	TAL	MAR	PHO		56th	34	
2024	McAnally–Hilgemann Racing	91	Chevy	DAY	ATL	LVS	BRI	COA	MAR	TEX	KAN	DAR	NWS	CLT	GTW	NSH	POC	IRP	RCH	MLW	BRI	KAN	TAL; 7	HOM	MAR	PHO	48th	30	

^{*} Season still in progress
^{1} Ineligible for series points

=== ARCA Racing Series ===
(key) (Bold – Pole position awarded by qualifying time. Italics – Pole position earned by points standings or practice time. * – Most laps led.)

ARCA Racing Series results
Year	Team	No.	Make	1	2	3	4	5	6	7	8	9	10	11	12	13	14	15	16	17	18	19	20	ARSC	Pts	Ref
2012	Venturini Motorsports	15	Chevy	DAY; 12		SLM; 11	TAL; 13					WIN; 18	NJE											14th	2720	
2012	Venturini Motorsports	15	Toyota		MOB; 12			TOL; 12	ELK; 13	POC; 9				IOW; 9		IRP; 6								14th	2720	
2012	Venturini Motorsports	15	Ford								MCH; 12				CHI; 5		POC; 6	BLN	ISF	MAD	SLM	DSF	KAN; 10	14th	2720	
2015	Lira Motorsports	58	Ford	DAY	MOB	NSH	SLM	TAL	TOL	NJE	POC	MCH	CHI; 1*	WIN	IOW	IRP	POC	BLN	ISF	DSF	SLM			34th	690	
2015	Lira Motorsports	38	Ford																			KEN; 1	KAN; 4	34th	690	
2016	Lira Motorsports	38	Ford	DAY	NSH	SLM	TAL	TOL	NJE	POC; 12	MCH	MAD	WIN	IOW	IRP	POC	BLN	ISF	DSF	SLM	CHI	KEN	KAN	108th	170	

==== K&N Pro Series East ====
NASCAR K&N Pro Series East results
Year	Team	No.	Make	1	2	3	4	5	6	7	8	9	10	11	12	13	14	15	16	NKNPSEC	Pts	Ref
2011	Mark Reed	04	Toyota	GRE	SBO	RCH	IOW	BGS	JFC; 27	LGY	NHA; 34	COL	GRE; 16	NHA	DOV					41st	258	
2014	Bill McAnally Racing	99	Ford	NSM	DAY	BRI	GRE	RCH	IOW	BGS	FIF	LGY	NHA	COL	IOW	GLN; 7	VIR	GRE	DOV	50th	37	

==== K&N Pro Series West ====
NASCAR K&N Pro Series West results
Year	Team	No.	Make	1	2	3	4	5	6	7	8	9	10	11	12	13	14	15	NKNPSWC	Pts	Ref
2013	Mark Reed	40	Chevy	PHO	S99	BIR	IOW	L44	SON; 34	CNS	IOW	EVG	SPO	MMP	SMP	AAS	KCR	PHO	74th	10	

== See also ==
- List of people with type 1 diabetes
