= Steller (disambiguation) =

Steller may refer to any of the following, all named after the botanist, zoologist, physician, and explorer Georg Wilhelm Steller:

== Animals ==
- Steller's eider, a duck
- Steller's jay, a bird related to the blue jay
- Steller's sea cow, an extinct animal native to the Bering Sea
- Steller's sea eagle, a bird of prey native to Russia
- Steller sea lion, found in the temperate eastern Pacific
- Gumboot chiton, or Cryptochiton stelleri

== Other ==
- Steller Secondary School, in Anchorage, Alaska
