= Pedigo =

Pedigo is a surname. Notable people with the surname include:

- Brienne Pedigo, American sports announcer
- Hayden Pedigo (born 1994), American avant-garde musician, politician, performance artist, and model
- Ian Pedigo (born 1973), American artist
- Tom Pedigo (1940–2000), American set decorator

== See also ==
- Perigo
