= Jeremy Clements =

American racing driver (born 1985)

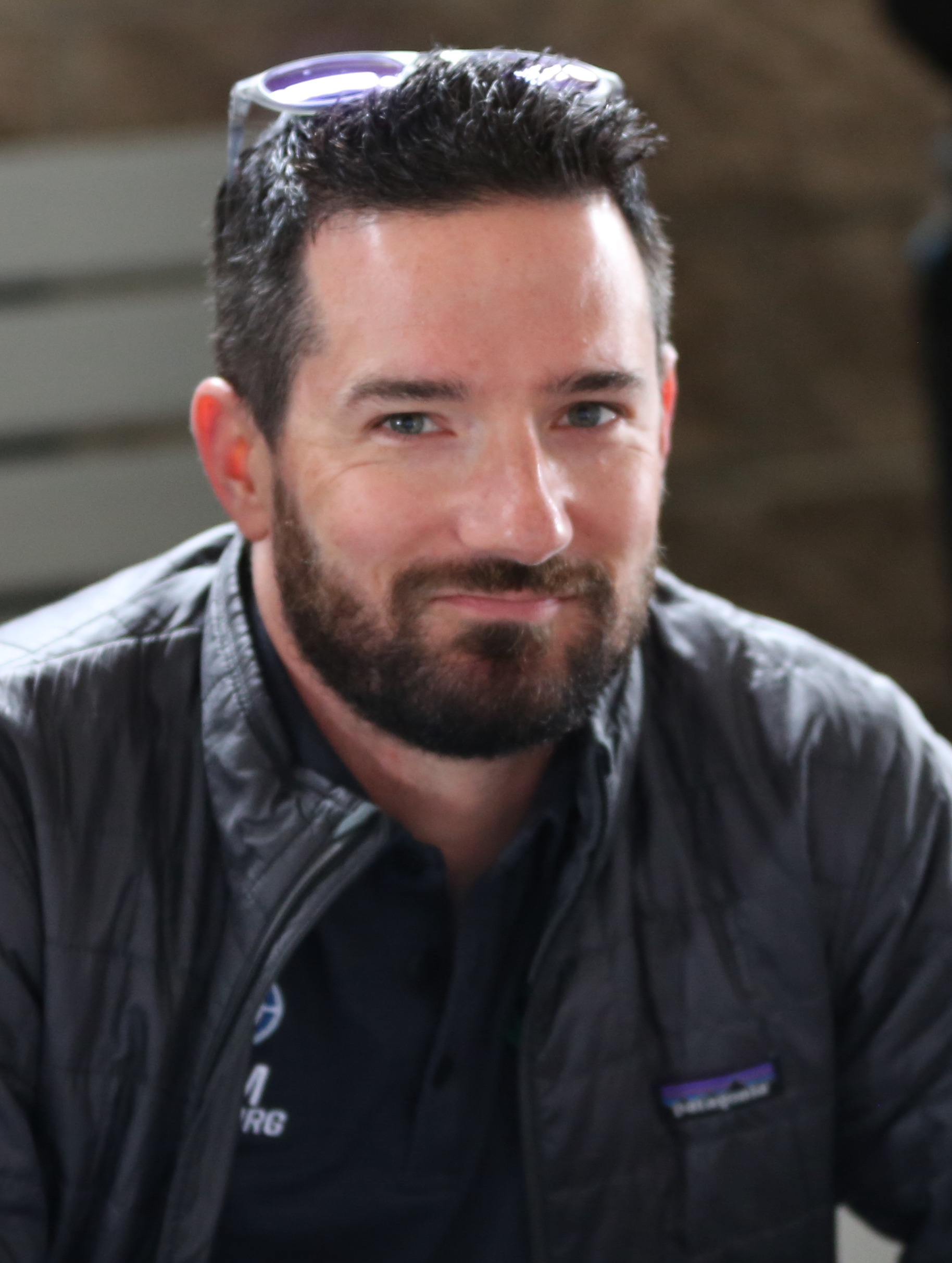
- Clements at Sonoma Raceway in 2023
- Born: Jeremy Wayne Clements; January 16, 1985 (age 41); Spartanburg, South Carolina, U.S.
- Height: 5 ft 8 in (1.73 m)
- Weight: 150 lb (68 kg)
- Achievements: Records; All-time most starts in the NASCAR O'Reilly Auto Parts Series

NASCAR O'Reilly Auto Parts Series career
- 563 races run over 21 years
- Car no., team: No. 51 (Jeremy Clements Racing)
- 2026 position: 20th
- Best finish: 12th (2017, 2021, 2022)
- First race: 2003 Trim Spa Dream Body 250 (Pikes Peak)
- Last race: 2026 O'Reilly Auto Parts 300 (Homestead)
- First win: 2017 Johnsonville 180 (Road America)
- Last win: 2022 Wawa 250 (Daytona)
Wins	Top tens	Poles
2	47	0

ARCA Menards Series career
- 40 races run over 7 years
- Best finish: 23rd (2007)
- First race: 2002 Food World 300 (Talladega)
- Last race: 2008 ARCA Re/Max 250 (Talladega)
- First win: 2007 Toyota ARCA 150 (Nashville)
Wins	Top tens	Poles
1	21	0
- Statistics up to date as of November 7, 2026.

Jeremy Wayne Clements (born January 16, 1985) is an American professional stock car racing driver. He competes full-time in the NASCAR O'Reilly Auto Parts Series, driving the No. 51 Chevrolet Camaro SS for Jeremy Clements Racing. He is the son of Tony Clements, owner of Clements Racing Engines.

Clements holds the record for the most starts by a driver in O'Reilly Auto Parts Series history.

== Racing career ==
=== Early career ===
A native of Spartanburg, South Carolina, Clements began his racing career at the age of eight by driving go-karts. In 1999, he moved on to race four-cylinder cars in both the Modified and Stock Series at Thunder Valley Speedway and Cherokee Speedway. Over the next three seasons, he won 55 feature events and two track championships.

=== Dirt Late Models and ARCA ===
In 2002, Clements moved up to the Limited Late Model division, where he won nine overall races as well as the track championship at Cherokee Speedway. He also made his ARCA Series debut at Talladega Superspeedway, starting sixth and finishing seventeenth in the No. 3 Chevrolet. He started five ARCA races in 2003, earning three top-tens. Clements was seriously injured on July 24, 2004, at the age of nineteen, while racing at 311 Speedway in North Carolina. While driving his late model, the driveshaft broke and pierced through the vehicle, almost completely severing his right hand. He was immediately taken to Wake Forest University Baptist Hospital in Winston-Salem, N.C., where he underwent a nine-hour orthopedic surgery. In the following year, Clements went through ten surgeries, including sewing his hand to his right side hip for a skin graft, using bone grafts from his hip, and taking tendons from his right foot. He did not race again until the following year.

On July 10, 2005, Clements got back behind the wheel of a racecar for the first time since the accident, testing his late model at Thunder Valley. He made his ARCA return at Chicagoland Speedway in September. In 2006, he ran ten races in the ARCA series in Ken Appling's No. 3 Chevrolet. He earned four top-tens, including three consecutive top-fives. He was also selected by General Motors to participate in a three-track test with Richard Childress Racing. Clements had a career season in 2007, earning eight top-tens in twelve races. On August 11, 2007, at Nashville Superspeedway, he earned his only ARCA win to date after starting second and leading 48 laps. In 2008, Clements ran seven races. He earned five top-tens and narrowly missed repeating his win at Nashville, finishing second.

=== 2003 ===
Clements made his debut in the NASCAR O'Reilly Auto Parts Series (then NASCAR Busch Series) in 2003 at Pikes Peak International Raceway. Driving the No. 71 Chevrolet for Young Racing, he started 35th and finished 31st after an early crash.

=== 2007 ===
Clements did not return to the NASCAR Busch Series again until 2007, when Clements signed with McGill Motorsports to run the last five races of the season in their No. 36 Chevrolet. He only finished two races and had a best finish of 23rd at Charlotte Motor Speedway.

=== 2008 ===
In 2008, Clements attempted four races for his family-owned No. 50 team. He qualified for two of them, earning finishes of 22nd and 30th. During these two years, he also spent time practicing and qualifying cars for Joe Gibbs Racing in races that conflicted with the NASCAR Sprint Cup Series schedule.

=== 2009 ===
For 2009, Clements increased his focus on the Nationwide Series, attempting thirteen races and making twelve. He ran six races in his family-owned No. 50 with a best finish of sixteenth. Shortly before the October race at Kansas Speedway, Clements and sponsor Saxon Group joined forces with JD Motorsports to finish out the season in the No. 0 Chevrolet. In his second race with JD, he finished a then-career-best twelfth at Auto Club Speedway.

=== 2010 ===
In the offseason, it was announced that Clements would drive at least the first three races of the 2010 season in the No. 0 for JD Motorsports with sponsorship from Boudreaux's Butt Paste. After missing the field at Daytona due to qualifying being rained out, his plans for the rest of the season were up in the air. The No. 0 team was shut down, and JD moved Clements to the No. 04. He attempted the next two races as planned, but failed to qualify for both of them. Clements made his first race of the season in April at Nashville Superspeedway, finishing 22nd. He attempted nineteen more races, qualifying for fifteen of them. Clements earned his first career top-ten at Gateway International Raceway in October, finishing tenth and also leading six laps (the first laps led of his career).

=== 2011 ===
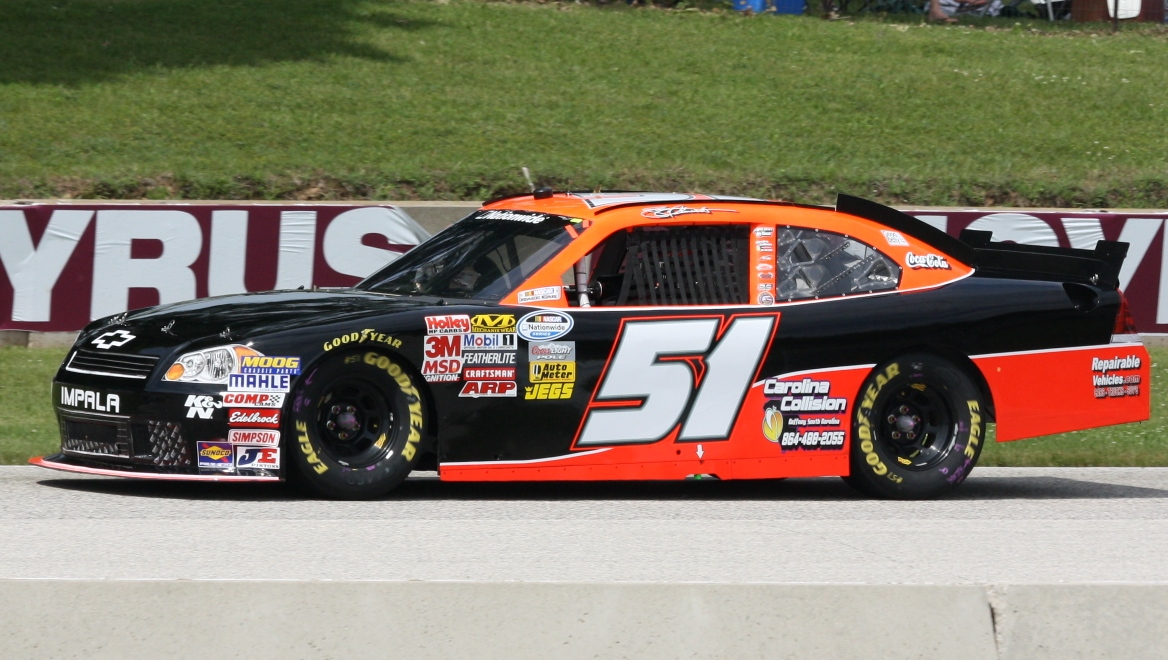
Clements racing in 2011

In 2011, Clements competed in all 34 races, finishing fifteenth in points. He had no top-ten finishes, but had three fourteenth-place finishes and ten top-twenty finishes during the season.

=== 2012 ===
For 2012, Clements continued in the Nationwide Series with his team. He drove two races for JD Motorsports at Richmond and Indianapolis when Ty Dillon was using his 51. Clements had two top-ten finishes.

=== 2013 ===
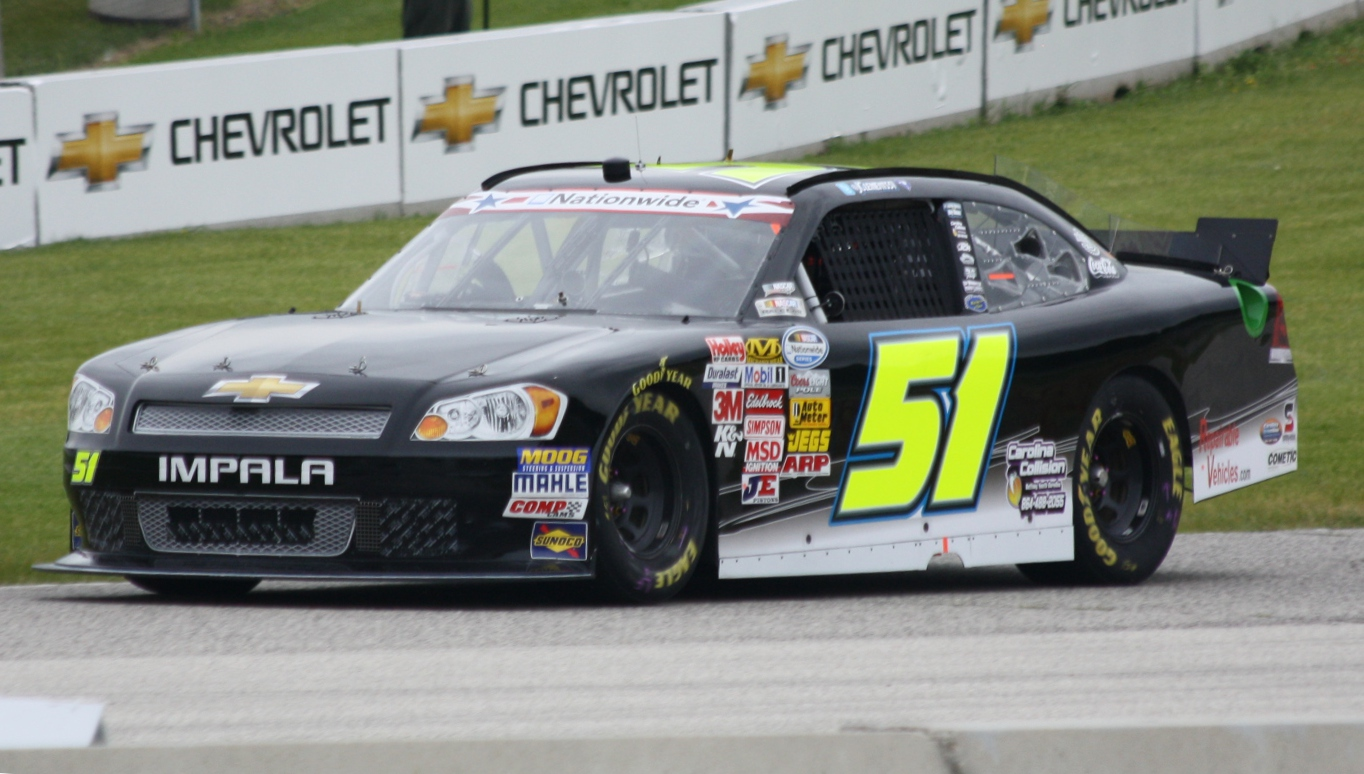
Clements racing at Road America in 2013

After finishing 33rd in the first race of the 2013 NASCAR Nationwide Series season, Clements was suspended indefinitely by NASCAR on February 27, 2013. The sanctioning body stated that the suspension was due to violations of the NASCAR Code of Conduct, as defined in Section 7–5 of the sanctioning body's rulebook, as well as Section 12–1, actions detrimental to stock car racing. Clements, in an interview with ESPN, was later quoted as saying, "When you say 'racial' remark, it wasn't used to describe anybody or anything. So that's all I'm going to say to that. And it really wasn't. I was describing racing, and the word I used was incorrect and I shouldn't have said it. It shouldn't be used at all." The MTV editor who had the conversation with Clements, Marty Beckerman, confirmed that Clements said a phrase that included the "n-word". Clements sat out two races and returned for the rest of the season. His season was highlighted by top-ten finishes at the huge Talladega Superspeedway tri-oval and the series' inaugural race at the Mid-Ohio Sports Car Course.

=== 2014 ===
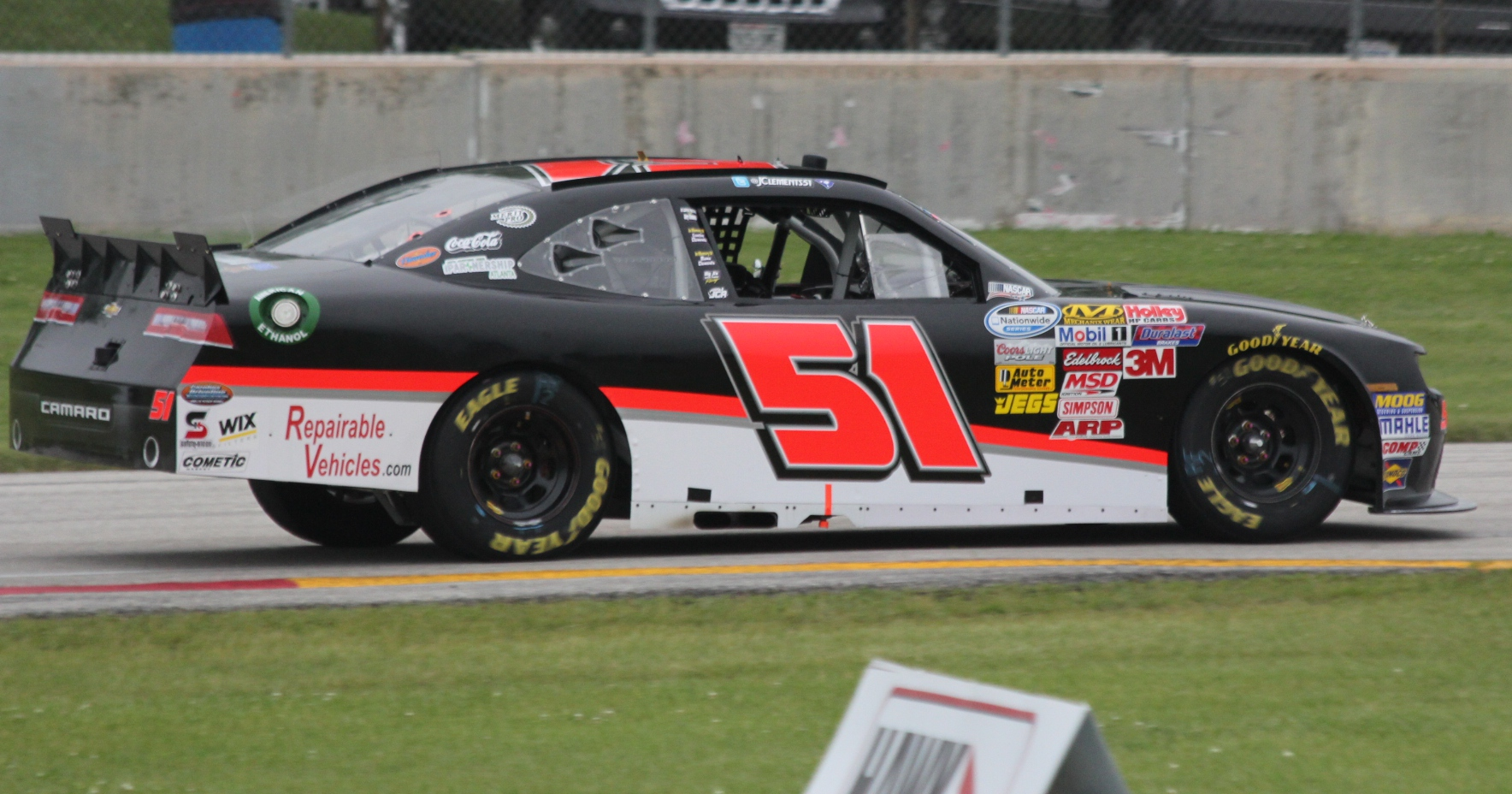
Clements competing at Road America in 2014

After several equipment setbacks in the 2014 NASCAR Nationwide Series, Clements had a brief moment in the top five in the Aaron's 312 at Talladega Superspeedway on May 3, 2014, before a crash forced him out with four laps to go. Ryan Blaney, who was in second at the time, ricocheted off the wall into Clements and sent his car hard into the wall. At the Gardner Denver 200 at Road America, Clements recorded a then career-best sixth-place finish.

=== 2015 ===
2015 was a decent season for Clements despite a best finish of tenth at Dover and a handful of poor finishes.

=== 2016 ===
At Talladega in 2016, Clements led laps under caution and recorded his first Xfinity top-five finish, a fourth.

=== 2017 ===
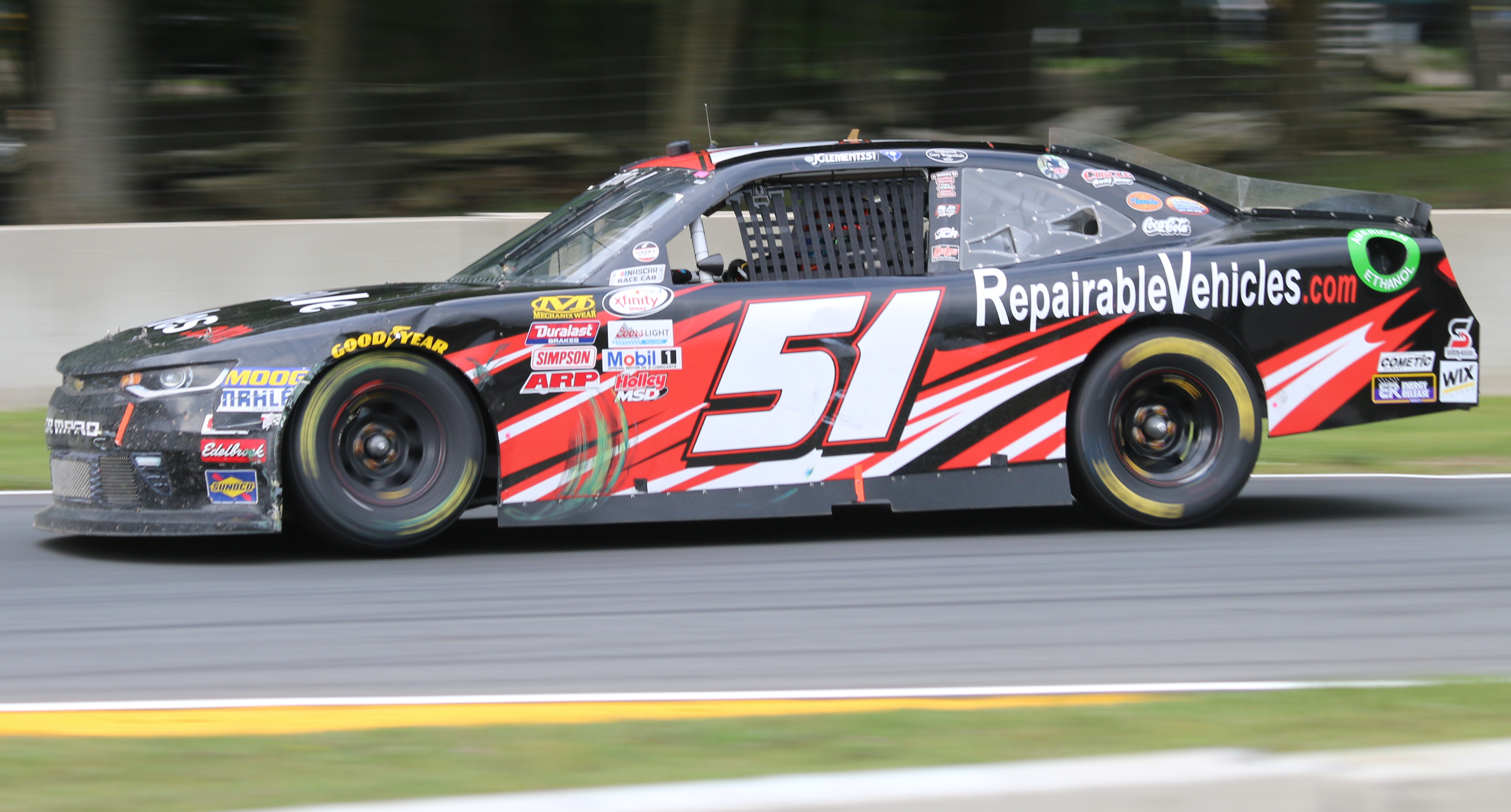
Clements during the 2017 Johnsonville 180.

In 2017, Clements scored a top-ten outing at Iowa, in which he finished seventh. A few races later, he would score his first career win at Road America after he and Matt Tifft got together with two laps to go. Clements' win was the first for an independent Xfinity Series driver and team not affiliated with NASCAR's Cup Series since David Gilliland won at Kentucky in 2006.

=== 2018 ===
In 2018, Clements finished inside the top twenty in 27 of 33 races, and finished fifteenth in the final standings.

=== 2019 ===
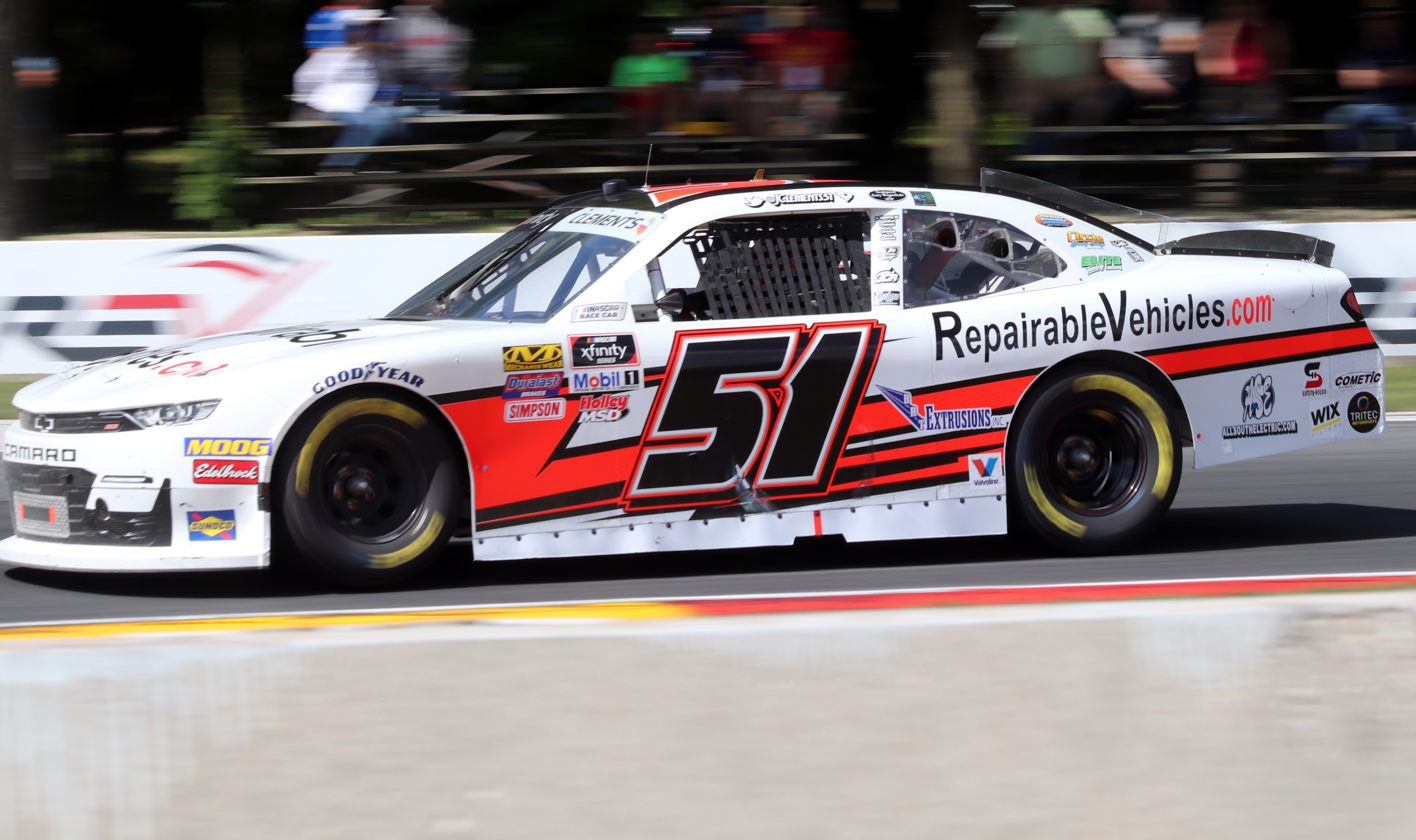
Clements racing at Road America in 2019

Clements showed similar consistency in 2019 and finished fourteenth in the standings.

=== 2021 ===
The 2021 season would be one of Clements' best. Despite not winning a race, he scored eight top-ten finishes and qualified for the playoffs on points. He finished twelfth in the final standings, tying his best points finish.

=== 2022 ===
In 2022, Clements scored his second career win after a firm tenth-place finish at Watkins Glen put him in a good starting place at Daytona. The win at the Daytona night race after overtime, earned him a playoff appearance at first. However, NASCAR issued the team an L2 penalty four days later after the post-race inspection discovered an illegally modified intake manifold. Clements kept the win but was declared ineligible for the playoffs. In addition, crew chief Mark Setzer was fined US$60,000, and the team was docked 75 owner and driver points, plus 10 playoff points should the team qualify for the postseason. Clements' appeal was heard on September 13; panel members Tom DeLoach, Richard Gore and Dixon Johnston found in Clements's favor, rescinding the penalty and revoking the punishments. As a result, he regained his eligibility for the 2022 playoffs. On October 18, Setzer was suspended for one race and fined US$25,000 for an L1 Penalty under Section 14.4.B.E, which deals with the modification of a composite body part following the Las Vegas race. In addition, the No. 51 was docked 40 driver and owner points. Clements finished twelfth in the points standings.

=== 2023 ===
2023 was a disappointing season for Clements. He recorded seven top-fifteens, with his best showings being two fourteenth place finishes. He failed to record a single top-ten finish and finished nineteenth in the point standings.

=== 2024 ===
Clements' 2024 season would follow a similar trend to the previous season. He scored just one top-ten finish, a sixth-place finish at Atlanta, and finished twentieth in the standings.

=== 2025 ===
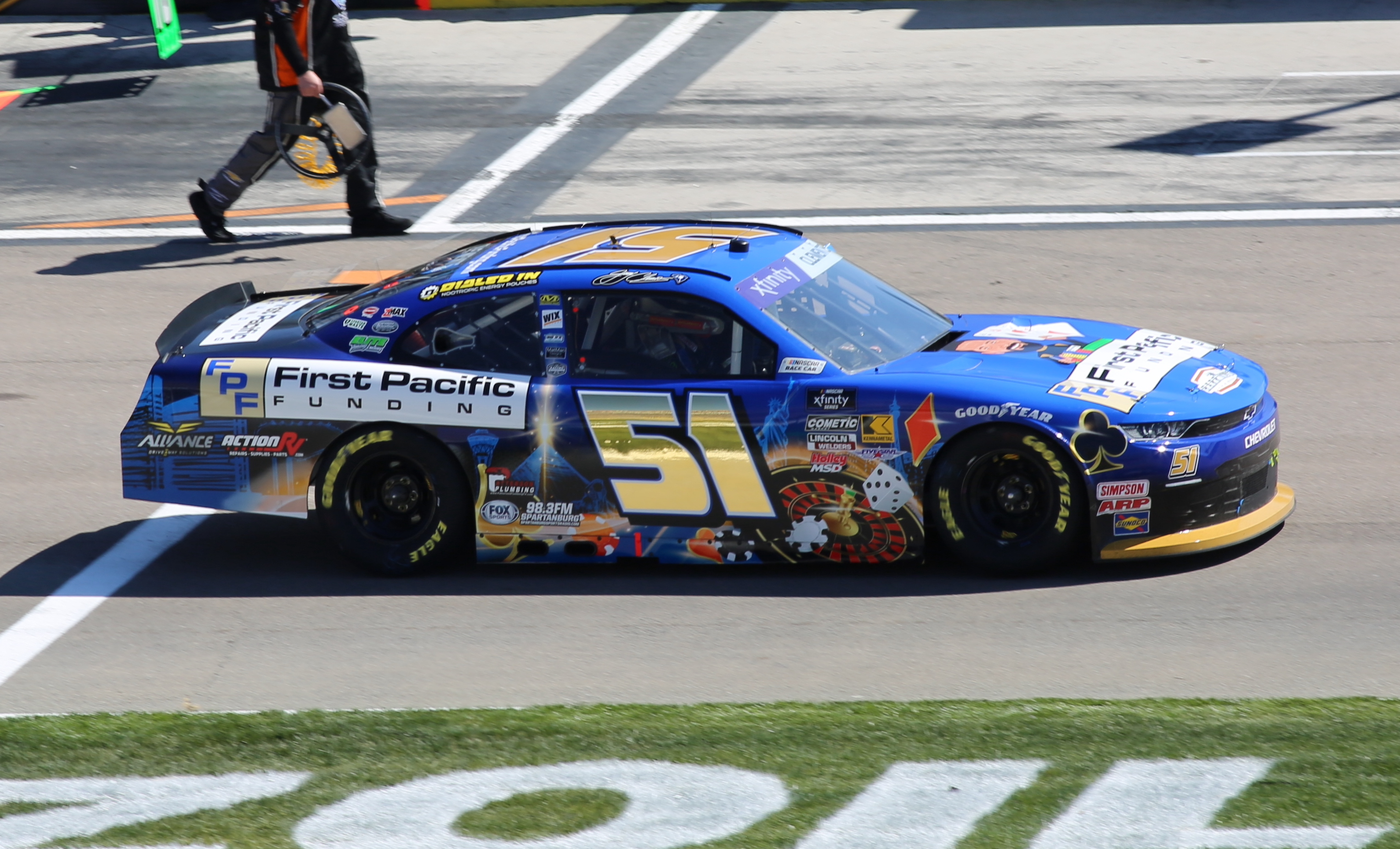
Clements' No. 51 car at Las Vegas Motor Speedway in 2025

Clements began the 2025 season with a ninth-place finish at Daytona. Clements was awarded an extra point because he scored the Xfinity Fastest Lap in the race. At Circuit of the Americas, Clements made his 500th Xfinity Series start, becoming the fourth driver to do so. He ended the season with four top-ten finishes and finished 21st in the standings.

=== 2026 ===
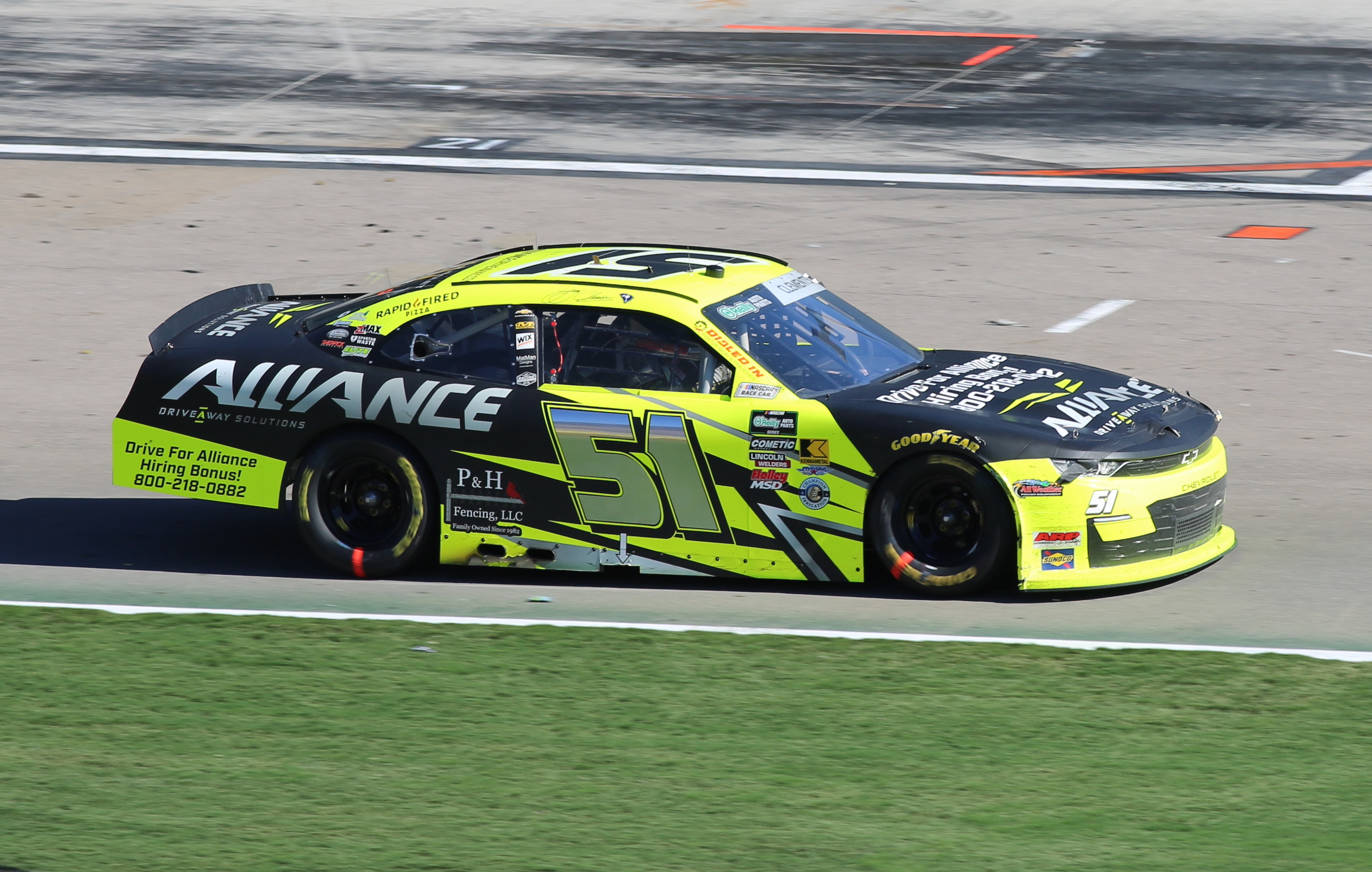
Clements' No. 51 car at Las Vegas Motor Speedway in 2026

Clements started the 2026 season by retiring and finishing 32nd at Daytona. On June 20, at San Diego, he surpassed Kenny Wallace to become the series' record holder for the most starts of any driver in the series with 548.

== Motorsports career results ==
=== Racing career summary ===
Season	Series	Team	Races	Wins	Top 5	Top 10	Points	Position
2002	ARCA Re/Max Series	Kenneth Appling Racing	1	0	0	0	420	74th
2003	ARCA Re/Max Series	Kenneth Appling Racing	5	0	2	3	750	36th
2003	NASCAR Busch Series	Kenneth Appling Racing	1	0	0	0	70	137th
2004	ARCA Re/Max Series	Kenneth Appling Racing	4	0	0	1	380	70th
2005	ARCA Re/Max Series	Kenneth Appling Racing	2	0	0	0	175	112th
2006	ARCA Re/Max Series	Kenneth Appling Racing	10	0	3	4	1555	31st
2007	ARCA Re/Max Series	Kenneth Appling Racing	12	1	6	8	2000	23rd
2007	NASCAR Busch Series	McGill Motorsports	5	0	0	0	301	87th
2008	ARCA Re/Max Series	Kenneth Appling Racing	7	0	2	5	1185	31st
2008	NASCAR Nationwide Series	Jeremy Clements Motorsports	2	0	0	0	170	102nd
2009	NASCAR Nationwide Series	Jeremy Clements Motorsports	6	0	0	0	951	50th
2009	NASCAR Nationwide Series	JD Motorsports	6	0	0	0	951	50th
2010	NASCAR Nationwide Series	JD Motorsports	16	0	0	1	1390	34th
2011	NASCAR Nationwide Series	Jeremy Clements Racing	34	0	0	0	696	15th
2012	NASCAR Nationwide Series	Jeremy Clements Racing	33	0	0	2	609	14th
2013	NASCAR Nationwide Series	Jeremy Clements Racing	31	0	0	2	638	16th
2014	NASCAR Nationwide Series	Jeremy Clements Racing	33	0	0	2	757	15th
2015	NASCAR Xfinity Series	Jeremy Clements Racing	33	0	0	1	801	14th
2016	NASCAR Xfinity Series	Jeremy Clements Racing	33	0	1	3	693	15th
2017	NASCAR Xfinity Series	Jeremy Clements Racing	33	1	1	2	2107	12th
2018	NASCAR Xfinity Series	Jeremy Clements Racing	33	0	0	2	619	15th
2019	NASCAR Xfinity Series	Jeremy Clements Racing	33	0	1	4	699	14th
2020	NASCAR Xfinity Series	Jeremy Clements Racing	33	0	1	5	666	13th
2021	NASCAR Xfinity Series	Jeremy Clements Racing	33	0	0	8	2126	12th
2022	NASCAR Xfinity Series	Jeremy Clements Racing	33	1	2	5	2069	12th
2023	NASCAR Xfinity Series	Jeremy Clements Racing	33	0	0	0	533	19th
2024	NASCAR Xfinity Series	Jeremy Clements Racing	33	0	0	1	477	20th
2025	NASCAR Xfinity Series	Jeremy Clements Racing	33	0	0	4	501	21st
2026	NASCAR O'Reilly Auto Parts Series	Jeremy Clements Racing	28	0	1	5	481*	19th*

=== NASCAR ===
(key) (Bold – Pole position awarded by qualifying time. Italics – Pole position earned by points standings or practice time. * – Most laps led.)

==== O'Reilly Auto Parts Series ====
NASCAR O'Reilly Auto Parts Series results
Year	Team	No.	Make	1	2	3	4	5	6	7	8	9	10	11	12	13	14	15	16	17	18	19	20	21	22	23	24	25	26	27	28	29	30	31	32	33	34	35	NOAPSC	Pts	Ref
2003	Kenneth Appling Racing	71	Chevy	DAY	CAR	LVS	DAR	BRI	TEX	TAL	NSH	CAL	RCH	GTW	NZH	CLT	DOV	NSH	KEN	MLW	DAY	CHI	NHA	PPR; 31	IRP	MCH	BRI	DAR	RCH	DOV	KAN	CLT	MEM						137th	70	
2003	Kenneth Appling Racing	51	Chevy																															ATL; DNQ	PHO	CAR	HOM		137th	70	
2007	McGill Motorsports	36	Chevy	DAY	CAL	MXC	LVS	ATL	BRI	NSH	TEX	PHO	TAL	RCH	DAR	CLT	DOV	NSH	KEN	MLW	NHA	DAY	CHI	GTW	IRP	CGV	GLN	MCH	BRI	CAL	RCH	DOV	KAN	CLT; 23	MEM; 40	TEX; 42	PHO; 38	HOM; 27	87th	301	
2008	Joe Gibbs Racing	18	Toyota	DAY	CAL	LVS	ATL	BRI	NSH	TEX	PHO	MXC	TAL	RCH	DAR	CLT	DOV	NSH	KEN; QL^{†}	MLW	NHA	DAY																	102nd	170	
2008	Jeremy Clements Motorsports	50	Chevy																				CHI; DNQ	GTW; 22	IRP	CGV	GLN	MCH; DNQ	BRI	CAL	RCH	DOV	KAN	CLT	MEM	TEX	PHO	HOM; 30	102nd	170	
2009	Jeremy Clements Motorsports	50	Chevy	DAY	CAL	LVS	BRI	TEX	NSH; 39	PHO	TAL	RCH	DAR	CLT; 27	DOV	NSH	KEN	MLW	NHA	DAY	CHI; 35	GTW; 16	IRP			MCH; 25	BRI	CGV	ATL; 36	RCH	DOV								50th	951	
2009	Joe Gibbs Racing	18	Toyota																					IOW; QL^{†}	GLN														50th	951	
2009	JD Motorsports	0	Chevy																													KAN; 32	CAL; 12	CLT; 22	MEM; 29	TEX; 33	PHO; 29	HOM; DNQ	50th	951	
2010	JD Motorsports	0	Chevy	DAY; DNQ																																			34th	1390	
2010	JD Motorsports	04	Chevy		CAL; DNQ	LVS; DNQ	BRI	NSH; 22	PHO	TEX; 33	TAL; DNQ	RCH	DAR	DOV	CLT; 16	NSH; 19	KEN; 12	ROA	NHA	DAY; 37	CHI; DNQ	GTW; DNQ	IRP	IOW; 20	GLN	MCH; 25	BRI; 23	CGV	ATL; DNQ	RCH; 34	DOV; 33	KAN; 32	CAL	CLT; 34	GTW; 10	TEX; 19	PHO	HOM; 39	34th	1390	
2011	Jeremy Clements Racing	51	Chevy	DAY; 16	PHO; 22	LVS; 27	BRI; 16	CAL; 35	TEX; 21	TAL; 24	NSH; 23	RCH; 23	DAR; 26	DOV; 24	IOW; 14	CLT; 26	CHI; 29	MCH; 26	ROA; 32	DAY; 32	KEN; 31	NHA; 19	NSH; 21	IRP; 18	IOW; 17	GLN; 24	CGV; 39	BRI; 32	ATL; 14	RCH; 14	CHI; 21	DOV; 18	KAN; 23	CLT; 29	TEX; 26	PHO; 24	HOM; 18		15th	696	
2012	Jeremy Clements Racing	51	Chevy	DAY; 25	PHO; 22	LVS; 21	BRI; 20	CAL; 20	TEX; 29	RCH; 33	TAL; 29	DAR; 33	IOW; 23	CLT; 18	DOV; 10	MCH; 31	ROA; 25	KEN; 21	DAY; 11	NHA; 17	CHI; 22		IOW; 21	GLN; 19	CGV; 25	BRI; 33	ATL; 15		CHI; 30	KEN; 15	DOV; 27	CLT; 19	KAN; 35	TEX; 16	PHO; 33	HOM; 22			14th	609	
2012	Jeremy Clements Racing	4	Chevy																			IND; 10						RCH; 24											14th	609	
2013	Jeremy Clements Racing	51	Chevy	DAY; 33	PHO	LVS	BRI; 33	CAL; 21	TEX; 35	RCH; 37	TAL; 9	DAR; 20	CLT; 22	DOV; 19	IOW; 17	MCH; 13	ROA; 23	KEN; 25	DAY; 22	NHA; 23	CHI; 25	IND; 35	IOW; 21	GLN; 20	MOH; 10	BRI; 22	ATL; 23	RCH; 26	CHI; 24	KEN; 20	DOV; 20	KAN; 36	CLT; 20	TEX; 22	PHO; 26	HOM; 30			16th	638	
2014	Jeremy Clements Racing	51	Chevy	DAY; 29	PHO; 21	LVS; 32	BRI; 18	CAL; 36	TEX; 18	DAR; 31	RCH; 22	TAL; 23	IOW; 22	CLT; 23	DOV; 20	MCH; 20	ROA; 6	KEN; 30	DAY; 8	NHA; 20	CHI; 13	IND; 26	IOW; 25	GLN; 16	MOH; 22	BRI; 23	ATL; 22	RCH; 21	CHI; 33	KEN; 21	DOV; 18	KAN; 17	CLT; 22	TEX; 21	PHO; 11	HOM; 13			15th	757	
2015	Jeremy Clements Racing	51	Chevy	DAY; 14	ATL; 21	LVS; 22	PHO; 16	CAL; 24	TEX; 22	BRI; 13	RCH; 14	TAL; 17	IOW; 15	CLT; 13	DOV; 10	MCH; 31	CHI; 19	DAY; 28	KEN; 26	NHA; 19	IND; 15	IOW; 21	GLN; 11	MOH; 17	BRI; 14	ROA; 28	DAR; 20	RCH; 34	CHI; 20	KEN; 19	DOV; 21	CLT; 20	KAN; 19	TEX; 17	PHO; 30	HOM; 22			14th	801	
2016	Jeremy Clements Racing	51	Chevy	DAY; 15	ATL; 17	LVS; 20	PHO; 28	CAL; 21	TEX; 24	BRI; 33	RCH; 22	TAL; 4	DOV; 22	CLT; 20	POC; 31	MCH; 21	IOW; 16	DAY; 16	KEN; 16	NHA; 13	IND; 17	IOW; 17	GLN; 25	MOH; 34	BRI; 6	ROA; 25	DAR; 8	RCH; 17	CHI; 16	KEN; 12	DOV; 22	CLT; 22	KAN; 28	TEX; 18	PHO; 31	HOM; 24			15th	693	
2017	Jeremy Clements Racing	51	Chevy	DAY; 35	ATL; 37	LVS; 26	PHO; 19	CAL; 22	TEX; 21	BRI; 17	RCH; 15	TAL; 27	CLT; 17	DOV; 23	POC; 17	MCH; 23	IOW; 7	DAY; 15	KEN; 22	NHA; 21	IND; 31	IOW; 28	GLN; 35	MOH; 37	BRI; 18	ROA; 1	DAR; 21	RCH; 16	CHI; 20	KEN; 22	DOV; 22	CLT; 20	KAN; 25	TEX; 22	PHO; 23	HOM; 23			12th	2107	
2018	Jeremy Clements Racing	51	Chevy	DAY; 16	ATL; 27	LVS; 22	PHO; 20	CAL; 15	TEX; 16	BRI; 40	RCH; 8	TAL; 35	DOV; 18	CLT; 35	POC; 15	MCH; 15	IOW; 20	CHI; 17	DAY; 34	KEN; 18	NHA; 18	IOW; 20	GLN; 14	MOH; 17	BRI; 13	ROA; 13	DAR; 16	IND; 14	LVS; 13	RCH; 16	ROV; 18	DOV; 20	KAN; 10	TEX; 14	PHO; 17	HOM; 19			15th	619	
2019	Jeremy Clements Racing	51	Chevy	DAY; 36	ATL; 18	LVS; 15	PHO; 13	CAL; 14	TEX; 26	BRI; 13	RCH; 35	TAL; 27	DOV; 18	CLT; 13	POC; 16	MCH; 15	IOW; 12	CHI; 13	DAY; 9	KEN; 13	NHA; 15	IOW; 30	GLN; 11	MOH; 11	BRI; 4	ROA; 8	DAR; 12	IND; 11	LVS; 20	RCH; 16	ROV; 11	DOV; 36	KAN; 6	TEX; 28	PHO; 18	HOM; 16			14th	699	
2020	Jeremy Clements Racing	51	Chevy	DAY; 28	LVS; 31	CAL; 9	PHO; 36	DAR; 12	CLT; 32	BRI; 8	ATL; 13	HOM; 12	HOM; 27	TAL; 24	POC; 3	IRC; 13	KEN; 12	KEN; 11	TEX; 11	KAN; 12	ROA; 29	DRC; 6	DOV; 13	DOV; 19	DAY; 20	DAR; 32	RCH; 17	RCH; 17	BRI; 11	LVS; 13	TAL; 20	ROV; 16	KAN; 15	TEX; 27	MAR; 15	PHO; 10			13th	666	
2021	Jeremy Clements Racing	51	Chevy	DAY; 22	DRC; 10	HOM; 9	LVS; 17	PHO; 10	ATL; 12	MAR; 14	TAL; 14	DAR; 6	DOV; 12	COA; 23	CLT; 10	MOH; 33	TEX; 14	NSH; 11	POC; 13	ROA; 28	ATL; 8	NHA; 15	GLN; 16	IRC; 14	MCH; 11	DAY; 24	DAR; 8	RCH; 26	BRI; 13	LVS; 39	TAL; 24	ROV; 12	TEX; 29	KAN; 17	MAR; 9	PHO; 18			12th	2126	
2022	Jeremy Clements Racing	51	Chevy	DAY; 37	CAL; 17	LVS; 11	PHO; 18	ATL; 37	COA; 24	RCH; 20	MAR; 10	TAL; 23	DOV; 29	DAR; 29	TEX; 16	CLT; 22	PIR; 34	NSH; 22	ROA; 9	ATL; 17	NHA; 4	POC; 32	IRC; 19	MCH; 31	GLN; 10	DAY; 1	DAR; 21	KAN; 21	BRI; 16	TEX; 36	TAL; 20	ROV; 14	LVS; 15	HOM; 26	MAR; 17	PHO; 27			12th	2069	
2023	Jeremy Clements Racing	51	Chevy	DAY; 17	CAL; 18	LVS; 25	PHO; 20	ATL; 15	COA; 14	RCH; 36	MAR; 32	TAL; 19	DOV; 19	DAR; 14	CLT; 19	PIR; 22	SON; 17	NSH; 22	CSC; 20	ATL; 15	NHA; 15	POC; 15	ROA; 27	MCH; 26	IRC; 19	GLN; 37	DAY; 26	DAR; 21	KAN; 15	BRI; 24	TEX; 18	ROV; 23	LVS; 30	HOM; 21	MAR; 17	PHO; 20			19th	533	
2024	Jeremy Clements Racing	51	Chevy	DAY; 29	ATL; 6	LVS; 25	PHO; 15	COA; 19	RCH; 24	MAR; 22	TEX; 16	TAL; 35	DOV; 14	DAR; 37	CLT; 13	PIR; 30	SON; 23	IOW; 21	NHA; 21	NSH; 22	CSC; 37	POC; 30	IND; 30	MCH; 15	DAY; 27	DAR; 31	ATL; 29	GLN; 18	BRI; 12	KAN; 27	TAL; 36	ROV; 20	LVS; 18	HOM; 16	MAR; 27	PHO; 20			20th	477	
2025	Jeremy Clements Racing	51	Chevy	DAY; 9	ATL; 11	COA; 28	PHO; 21	LVS; 24	HOM; 26	MAR; 14	DAR; 21	BRI; 20	CAR; 10	TAL; 26	TEX; 31	CLT; 16	NSH; 18	MXC; 36	POC; 12	ATL; 10	CSC; 31	SON; 30	DOV; 26	IND; 12	IOW; 22	GLN; 15	DAY; 36	PIR; 17	GTW; 15	BRI; 9	KAN; 32	ROV; 27	LVS; 36	TAL; 37	MAR; 34	PHO; 33			21st	501	
2026	Jeremy Clements Racing	51	Chevy	DAY; 32	ATL; 29	COA; 32	PHO; 11	LVS; 24	DAR; 19	MAR; 37	CAR; 25	BRI; 15	KAN; 15	TAL; 5	TEX; 10	GLN; 33	DOV; 15	CLT; 30	NSH; 18	POC; 16	COR; 15	SON; 20	CHI; 35	ATL; 10	IND; 37	IOW; 30	DAY; 33	DAR; 9	GTW; 31	BRI; 14	LVS; 7	CLT; 20	PHO; 12	TAL; 18	MAR; 29	HOM; 25			20th	570	
^{†} – Qualified for Kyle Busch

^{*} Season still in progress
^{1} Ineligible for series points

=== ARCA Re/Max Series ===
(key) (Bold – Pole position awarded by qualifying time. Italics – Pole position earned by points standings or practice time. * – Most laps led.)

ARCA Re/Max Series results
Year	Car owner	No.	Make	1	2	3	4	5	6	7	8	9	10	11	12	13	14	15	16	17	18	19	20	21	22	23	ARSC	Pts	Ref
2002	Ken Appling	3	Chevy	DAY	ATL	NSH	SLM	KEN	CLT	KAN	POC	MCH	TOL	SBO	KEN	BLN	POC	NSH	ISF	WIN	DSF	CHI	SLM	TAL; 17	CLT; DNQ		74th	420	
2003	Ken Appling	3	Chevy	DAY; 34	ATL; 7	NSH; 35	SLM	TOL	KEN	CLT; 3	BLN	KAN	MCH	LER	POC	POC	NSH	ISF	WIN	DSF	CHI	SLM	TAL	CLT; 3	SBO		36th	750	
2004	Ken Appling	3	Pontiac	DAY; DNQ																							70th	380	
2004	Ken Appling	3	Chevy		NSH; 8	SLM	KEN; 29	TOL	CLT; 37	KAN; 37	POC	MCH	SBO	BLN	KEN	GTW	POC	LER	NSH	ISF	TOL	DSF	CHI	SLM	TAL		70th	380	
2005	Ken Appling	3	Chevy	DAY	NSH	SLM	KEN	TOL	LAN	MIL	POC	MCH	KAN	KEN	BLN	POC	GTW	LER	NSH	MCH	ISF	TOL	DSF	CHI; 34	SLM		112th	175	
2005	Ken Appling	3	Pontiac																							TAL; 23	112th	175	
2006	Ken Appling	3	Chevy	DAY; 13	NSH; 29	SLM	WIN	KEN; 14	TOL	POC; 27	MCH	KAN	KEN; 3	BLN	POC; 2	GTW; 5	NSH; 9	MCH; 38	ISF	MIL	TOL	DSF	CHI; 16	SLM	TAL; DNQ	IOW	31st	1555	
2007	Ken Appling	3	Chevy	DAY; 3	USA	NSH; 12	SLM	KAN; 35	WIN	KEN; 40	TOL	IOW	POC; 4	MCH; 5	BLN	KEN; 7	POC; 3	NSH; 1*	ISF	MIL	GTW; 36	DSF	CHI; 4	SLM	TAL; 6	TOL	23rd	2000	
2008	Ken Appling	3	Chevy	DAY; DNQ	SLM	IOW	KAN	CAR; 6	KEN; 33	TOL	POC; 31	MCH	CAY	KEN	BLN	POC; 6	NSH; 2	ISF	DSF	CHI; 9	SLM	NJE	TAL; 4	TOL			31st	1185	
