= 2015 Hisense 250 =

Motor race in Georgia, USA

Race details
- Race 2 of 33 of the 2015 NASCAR Xfinity Series
- Date: February 28, 2015
- Location: Atlanta Motor Speedway, Hampton, Georgia
- Course: Permanent racing facility
- Course length: 1.54 miles (2.48 km)
- Distance: 163 laps, 251.02 mi (403.98 km)
- Average speed: 149.813 miles per hour (241.101 km/h)

Pole position
| Driver | Joey Logano | Team Penske |
- Time: 30.104

Most laps led
| Driver | Kevin Harvick | JR Motorsports |
- Laps: 101

Winner
| No. 88 | Kevin Harvick | JR Motorsports |

Television in the United States
- Network: Fox Sports 1
- Announcers: Adam Alexander, Michael Waltrip, and Brad Keselowski

Radio in the United States
- Radio: PRN

The 2015 Hisense 250 was the 2nd race of the 2015 NASCAR Xfinity Series season and 24th iteration of the event. The race was held at Atlanta Motor Speedway a 1.54 miles (2.48 km) permanent asphalt quad-oval intermediate speedway in Hampton, Georgia on Saturday, February 28, 2015. Kevin Harvick dominated the race leading 101 laps and won. Rounding out the top 3 where Joey Logano who finished 2nd and Ty Dillon who finished 3rd.

== History ==
The layout of Atlanta Motor Speedway, the venue where the race was held.

Atlanta Motor Speedway is a 1.54 miles (2.48 km) permanent asphalt quad-oval intermediate speedway in Hampton, Georgia. The track is owned and operated by Speedway Motorsports, Inc. (SMI), and the NASCAR Xfinity Series began racing at AMS in 1992.

=== Entry list ===
- (R) denotes a rookie driver
- (I) Ineligible for points

| No | Driver | Team | Manufacturer |
|---|---|---|---|
| 0 | Harrison Rhodes (R) | JD Motorsports | Chevrolet |
| 1 | Elliott Sadler | Roush–Fenway Racing | Ford |
| 01 | Landon Cassill | JD Motorsports | Chevrolet |
| 2 | Brian Scott | Richard Childress Racing | Chevrolet |
| 3 | Ty Dillon | Richard Childress Racing | Chevrolet |
| 4 | Ross Chastain (R) | JD Motorsports | Chevrolet |
| 6 | Bubba Wallace (R) | Roush–Fenway Racing | Ford |
| 7 | Regan Smith | JR Motorsports | Chevrolet |
| 8 | Blake Koch | TriStar Motorsports | Toyota |
| 9 | Chase Elliott | JR Motorsports | Chevrolet |
| 13 | Cody Ware (I) | MBM Motorsports | Dodge |
| 14 | Cale Conley (R) | TriStar Motorsports | Toyota |
| 15 | Chris Cockrum | Rick Ware Racing | Chevrolet |
| 16 | Ryan Reed | Roush–Fenway Racing | Ford |
| 18 | Daniel Suárez (R) | Joe Gibbs Racing | Toyota |
| 19 | Mike Bliss | TriStar Motorsports | Toyota |
| 20 | Matt Kenseth (I) | Joe Gibbs Racing | Toyota |
| 22 | Joey Logano (I) | Team Penske | Ford |
| 24 | Eric McClure | JGL Racing | Toyota |
| 25 | John Wes Townley (I) | Athenian Motorsports | Chevrolet |
| 28 | J. J. Yeley | JGL Racing | Toyota |
| 33 | Paul Menard (I) | Richard Childress Racing | Chevrolet |
| 39 | Ryan Sieg | RSS Racing | Chevrolet |
| 40 | Carl Long | MBM Motorsports | Toyota |
| 42 | Kyle Larson (I) | HScott Motorsports | Chevrolet |
| 43 | Dakoda Armstrong | Richard Petty Motorsports | Ford |
| 44 | David Starr | TriStar Motorsports | Toyota |
| 51 | Jeremy Clements | Jeremy Clements Racing | Chevrolet |
| 52 | Joey Gase | Jimmy Means Racing | Chevrolet |
| 54 | Erik Jones (I) | Joe Gibbs Racing | Toyota |
| 55 | Jeffrey Earnhardt | Viva Motorsports | Chevrolet |
| 60 | Chris Buescher | Roush–Fenway Racing | Ford |
| 62 | Brendan Gaughan | Richard Childress Racing | Chevrolet |
| 70 | Derrike Cope | Derrike Cope Racing | Chevrolet |
| 74 | Mike Harmon | Mike Harmon Racing | Dodge |
| 88 | Kevin Harvick (I) | JR Motorsports | Chevrolet |
| 89 | Morgan Shepherd | Shepherd Racing Ventures | Chevrolet |
| 90 | Jimmy Weller III | SS-Green Light Racing | Chevrolet |
| 97 | Josh Reaume | Obaika Racing | Chevrolet |
| 98 | Sam Hornish Jr. (I) | Biagi–DenBeste Racing | Ford |
Entry list

== Practice ==
Practice was held on Friday, February 27, 2015, at 12:59 PM ET. Joey Logano set the fastest lap with a time of 30.444 and a speed of 182.105 mph (293.070 km/h).

| Pos. | No | Driver | Team | Make | Time | Speed |
|---|---|---|---|---|---|---|
| 1 | 22 | Joey Logano | Team Penske | Ford | 30.444 | 182.105 |
| 2 | 62 | Brendan Gaughan | Richard Childress Racing | Chevrolet | 30.654 | 180.857 |
| 3 | 33 | Paul Menard | Richard Childress Racing | Chevrolet | 30.721 | 180.463 |
Official practice results

== Qualifying ==
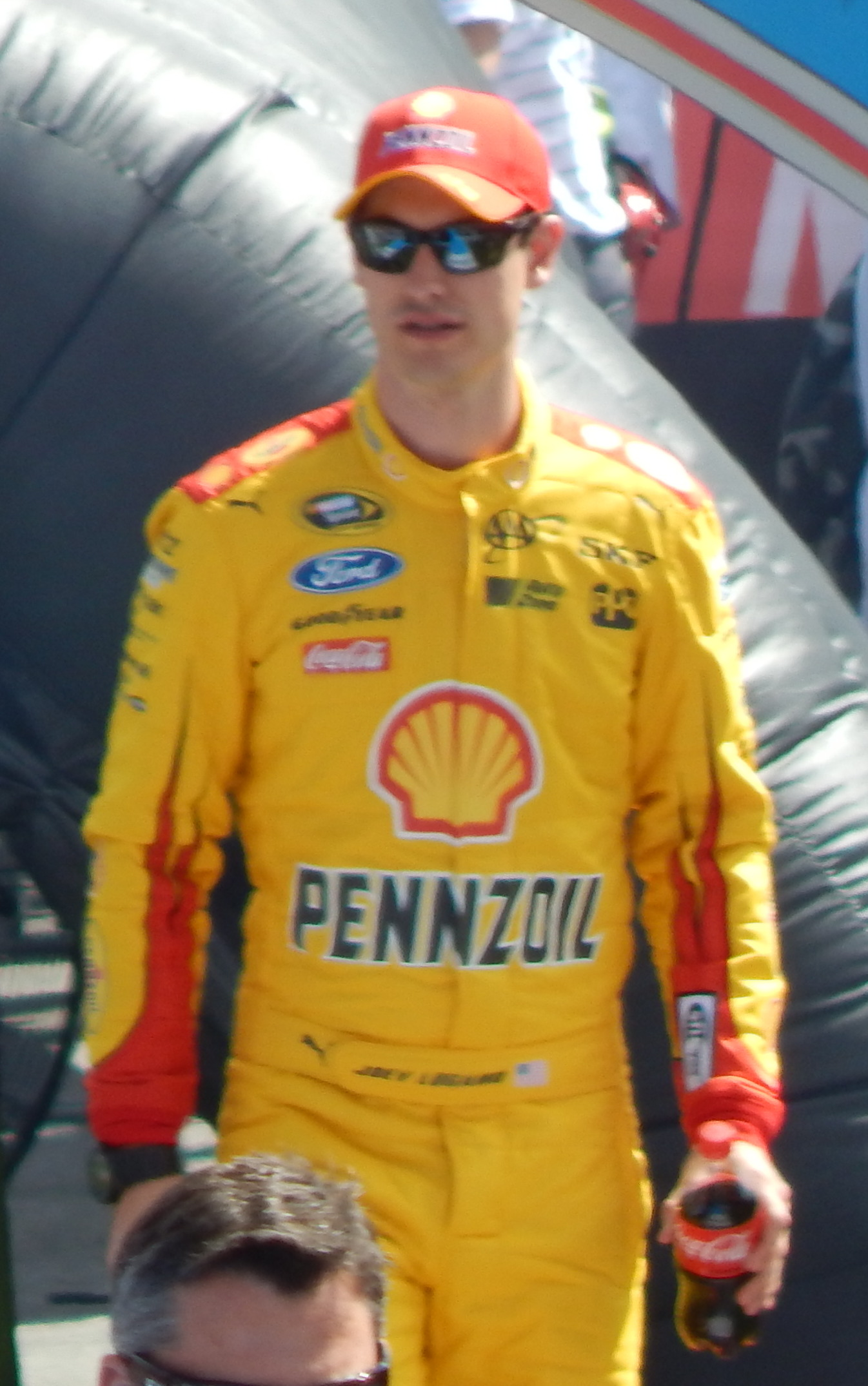
Joey Logano won the pole

Qualifying was held on Saturday, February 28, at 9:10 AM ET. Joey Logano won the pole with a time of 30.104 and a speed of 184.162 mph (296.380 km/h).

| Grid | No | Driver | Team | Manufacturer | Time | Speed |
|---|---|---|---|---|---|---|
| 1 | 22 | Joey Logano | Team Penske | Ford | 30.104 | 184.162 |
| 2 | 2 | Brian Scott | Richard Childress Racing | Chevrolet | 30.297 | 182.988 |
| 3 | 7 | Regan Smith | JR Motorsports | Chevrolet | 30.300 | 182.970 |
| 4 | 42 | Kyle Larson | HScott Motorsports | Chevrolet | 30.313 | 182.892 |
| 5 | 20 | Matt Kenseth | Joe Gibbs Racing | Toyota | 30.348 | 182.681 |
| 6 | 62 | Brendan Gaughan | Richard Childress Racing | Chevrolet | 30.370 | 182.549 |
| 7 | 39 | Ryan Sieg | RSS Racing | Chevrolet | 30.398 | 182.380 |
| 8 | 88 | Kevin Harvick | JR Motorsports | Chevrolet | 30.416 | 182.272 |
| 9 | 9 | Chase Elliott | JR Motorsports | Chevrolet | 30.418 | 182.261 |
| 10 | 98 | Sam Hornish Jr. | Biagi–DenBeste Racing | Ford | 30.444 | 182.105 |
| 11 | 33 | Paul Menard | Richard Childress Racing | Chevrolet | 30.467 | 181.967 |
| 12 | 54 | Erik Jones | Joe Gibbs Racing | Toyota | 30.530 | 181.592 |
| 13 | 25 | John Wes Townley | Athenian Motorsports | Chevrolet | 30.461 | 182.003 |
| 14 | 1 | Elliott Sadler | Roush–Fenway Racing | Ford | 30.510 | 181.711 |
| 15 | 28 | J. J. Yeley | JGL Racing | Toyota | 30.527 | 181.610 |
| 16 | 19 | Mike Bliss | TriStar Motorsports | Toyota | 30.529 | 181.598 |
| 17 | 3 | Ty Dillon | Richard Childress Racing | Chevrolet | 30.570 | 181.354 |
| 18 | 60 | Chris Buescher | Roush–Fenway Racing | Ford | 30.616 | 181.082 |
| 19 | 16 | Ryan Reed | Roush–Fenway Racing | Ford | 30.620 | 181.058 |
| 20 | 43 | Dakoda Armstrong | Richard Petty Motorsports | Ford | 30.638 | 180.952 |
| 21 | 18 | Daniel Suárez | Joe Gibbs Racing | Toyota | 30.640 | 180.940 |
| 22 | 51 | Jeremy Clements | Jeremy Clements Racing | Chevrolet | 30.665 | 180.792 |
| 23 | 6 | Bubba Wallace | Roush–Fenway Racing | Ford | 30.752 | 180.281 |
| 24 | 14 | ^{1} Cale Conley | TriStar Motorsports | Toyota | N/A | |
| 25 | 8 | Blake Koch | TriStar Motorsports | Toyota | 30.997 | 178.856 |
| 26 | 4 | Ross Chastain | JD Motorsports | Chevrolet | 31.060 | 178.493 |
| 27 | 01 | Landon Cassill | JD Motorsports | Chevrolet | 31.224 | 177.556 |
| 28 | 90 | Jimmy Weller III | SS-Green Light Racing | Chevrolet | 31.386 | 176.639 |
| 29 | 24 | Eric McClure | JGL Racing | Toyota | 31.395 | 176.589 |
| 30 | 44 | David Starr | TriStar Motorsports | Toyota | 31.443 | 176.319 |
| 31 | 52 | Joey Gase | Jimmy Means Racing | Chevrolet | 31.763 | 174.543 |
| 32 | 97 | Josh Reaume | Obaika Racing | Chevrolet | 31.793 | 174.378 |
| 33 | 70 | Derrike Cope | Derrike Cope Racing | Chevrolet | 31.941 | 173.570 |
Qualified via Owner Points
| 34 | 55 | Jeffrey Earnhardt | Viva Motorsports | Chevrolet | 31.945 | 173.548 |
| 35 | 0 | Harrison Rhodes | JD Motorsports | Chevrolet | 32.036 | 173.055 |
| 36 | 13 | Cody Ware | MBM Motorsports | Dodge | 32.303 | 171.625 |
| 37 | 15 | Chris Cockrum | Rick Ware Racing | Chevrolet | 32.525 | 170.453 |
| 38 | 74 | Mike Harmon | Mike Harmon Racing | Dodge | 32.568 | 170.228 |
| 39 | 40 | Carl Long | MBM Motorsports | Toyota | 32.792 | 169.066 |
| 40 | 89 | Morgan Shepherd | Shepherd Racing Ventures | Chevrolet | 35.075 | 158.061 |
Official qualifying result

- Notes: ^{1} – Cale Conley went to the rear for unapproved adjustments.

== Race results ==
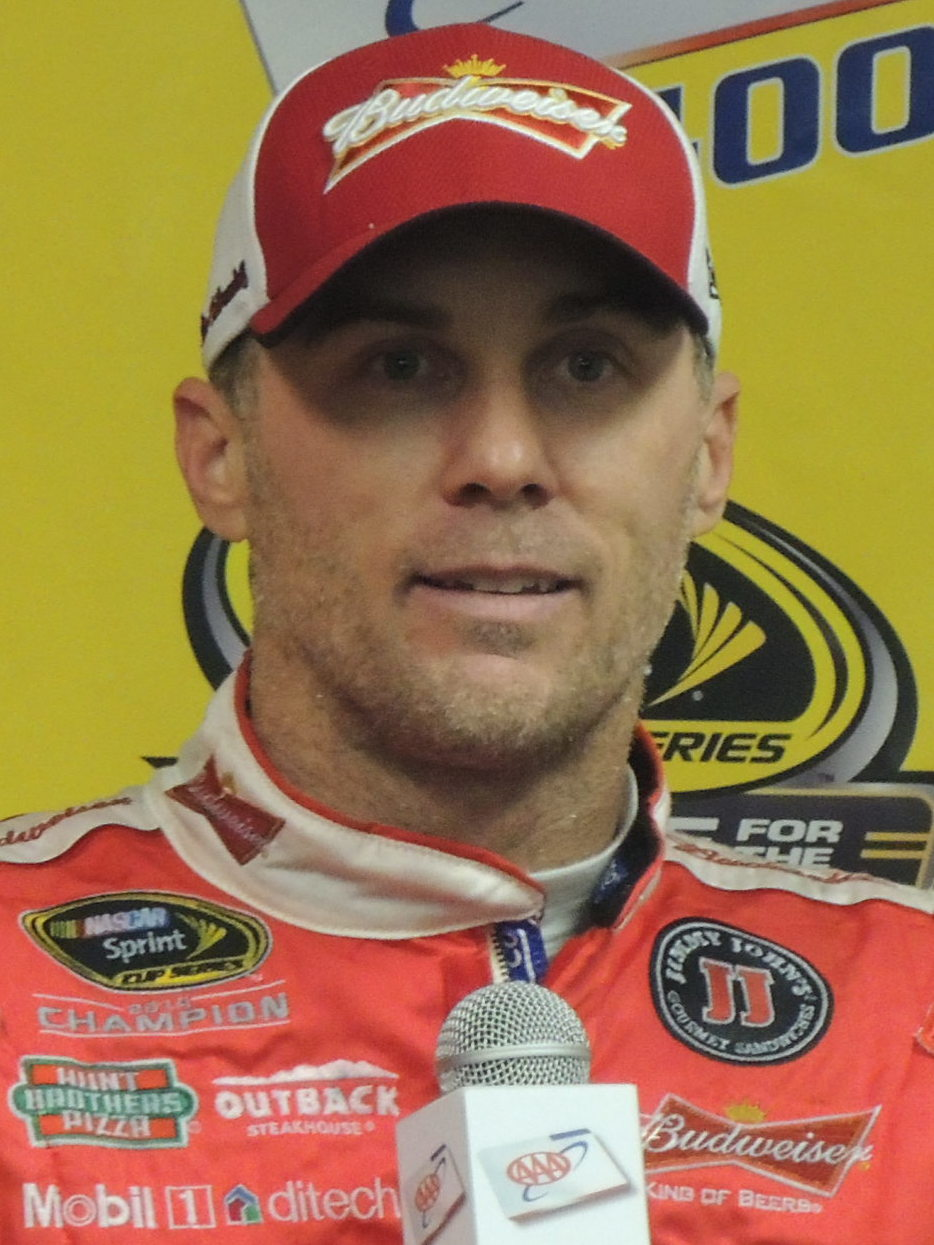
Kevin Harvick dominated and won the race.

| Pos | No | Driver | Manufacturer | Laps | Status | Points |
|---|---|---|---|---|---|---|
| 1 | 88 | Kevin Harvick | Chevrolet | 163 | running | 0 |
| 2 | 22 | Joey Logano | Ford | 163 | running | 0 |
| 3 | 3 | Ty Dillon | Chevrolet | 163 | running | 41 |
| 4 | 60 | Chris Buescher | Ford | 163 | running | 40 |
| 5 | 9 | Chase Elliott | Chevrolet | 163 | running | 39 |
| 6 | 33 | Paul Menard | Chevrolet | 163 | running | 0 |
| 7 | 2 | Brian Scott | Chevrolet | 163 | running | 37 |
| 8 | 20 | Matt Kenseth | Toyota | 163 | running | 0 |
| 9 | 7 | Regan Smith | Chevrolet | 163 | running | 35 |
| 10 | 42 | Kyle Larson | Chevrolet | 163 | running | 0 |
| 11 | 6 | Bubba Wallace | Ford | 162 | running | 33 |
| 12 | 62 | Brendan Gaughan | Chevrolet | 162 | running | 32 |
| 13 | 54 | Erik Jones | Toyota | 161 | running | 0 |
| 14 | 18 | Daniel Suárez | Toyota | 161 | running | 30 |
| 15 | 98 | Sam Hornish Jr. | Ford | 161 | running | 0 |
| 16 | 16 | Ryan Reed | Ford | 161 | running | 28 |
| 17 | 01 | Landon Cassill | Chevrolet | 161 | running | 27 |
| 18 | 1 | Elliott Sadler | Ford | 160 | running | 26 |
| 19 | 28 | J. J. Yeley | Toyota | 160 | running | 25 |
| 20 | 43 | Dakoda Armstrong | Ford | 160 | running | 24 |
| 21 | 22 | Jeremy Clements | Chevrolet | 160 | running | 23 |
| 22 | 8 | Blake Koch | Toyota | 160 | running | 22 |
| 23 | 39 | Ryan Sieg | Chevrolet | 159 | running | 21 |
| 24 | 4 | Ross Chastain | Chevrolet | 159 | running | 20 |
| 25 | 19 | Mike Bliss | Toyota | 159 | running | 19 |
| 26 | 44 | David Starr | Toyota | 159 | running | 18 |
| 27 | 25 | John Wes Townley | Chevrolet | 156 | running | 0 |
| 28 | 24 | Eric McClure | Toyota | 156 | running | 16 |
| 29 | 15 | Chris Cockrum | Chevrolet | 156 | running | 15 |
| 30 | 52 | Joey Gase | Chevrolet | 155 | running | 14 |
| 31 | 13 | Cody Ware | Dodge | 153 | running | 0 |
| 32 | 55 | Jeffrey Earnhardt | Chevrolet | 144 | running | 12 |
| 33 | 90 | Jimmy Weller III | Chevrolet | 140 | running | 11 |
| 34 | 0 | Harrison Rhodes | Chevrolet | 130 | running | 10 |
| 35 | 14 | Cale Conley | Toyota | 128 | Engine | 9 |
| 36 | 70 | Derrike Cope | Chevrolet | 128 | running | 8 |
| 37 | 74 | Mike Harmon | Dodge | 92 | Front hub | 7 |
| 38 | 97 | Josh Reaume | Chevrolet | 28 | Electrical | 6 |
| 39 | 40 | Carl Long | Toyota | 19 | Vibration | 5 |
| 40 | 89 | Morgan Shepherd | Chevrolet | 2 | Suspension | 4 |
Race Results

=== Race statistics ===
- 5 lead changes among 3 different drivers
- 3 cautions for 12 laps
- Time of race: 1 hour, 40 minute, 32 seconds
- Average speed: 149.813 mph (241.101 km/h)

Lap Leaders
| Laps | Leader |
|---|---|
| 1–49 | Joey Logano |
| 50–52 | Matt Kenseth |
| 53–126 | Kevin Harvick |
| 127–136 | Joey Logano |
| 137–163 | Kevin Harvick |

Total laps led
| Leader | Laps |
|---|---|
| Kevin Harvick | 101 |
| Joey Logano | 59 |
| Matt Kenseth | 3 |

== Standings after the race ==
| | Pos | Driver | Points |
|---|---|---|---|
| 1 | 1 | Chris Buescher | 83 |
| 1 | 1 | Ty Dillon | 83 (0) |
| 2 | 3 | Ryan Reed | 75 (–8) |
| 3 | 4 | Bubba Wallace | 66 (–17) |
| 1 | 5 | Dakoda Armstrong | 57 (–26) |
| 3 | 6 | David Starr | 56 (–27) |
| 12 | 6 | Brian Scott | 56 (–27) |
| 12 | 8 | Chase Elliott | 55 (–28) |
| 3 | 8 | Ross Chastain | 55 (–28) |
| 2 | 10 | Jeremy Clements | 53 (–30) |
| 1 | 11 | Elliott Sadler | 51 (–32) |
| 9 | 12 | Brendan Gaughan | 47 (–36) |

- Note: Only the first 12 positions are included for the driver standings.

| Previous race: 2015 Alert Today Florida 300 | NASCAR Xfinity Series; 2015 season | Next race: 2015 Boyd Gaming 300 |
