= Perigo =

Perigo is a surname. Notable people with the surname include:

- Lindsay Perigo (born 1951), New Zealand politician and television and radio broadcasting personality
- William Perigo (1911–1990), American basketball player and coach

== See also ==
- Pedigo
- Perrigo
