= 2015 Boyd Gaming 300 =

3rd race in the 2015 NASCAR Xfinity Series

Race details
- Race 3 of 33 of the 2015 NASCAR Xfinity Series
- Date: March 7, 2015
- Location: Las Vegas Motor Speedway, Las Vegas, Nevada
- Course: Permanent racing facility
- Course length: 1.500 miles (2.414 km)
- Distance: 200 laps, 300 mi (804.672 km)
- Scheduled distance: 200 laps, 300 mi (804.672 km)
- Average speed: 126.021 miles per hour (202.811 km/h)

Pole position
Driver	Austin Dillon	Richard Childress Racing
- Time: 29.295

Most laps led
Driver	Austin Dillon	Richard Childress Racing
- Laps: 183

Winner
No. 33	Austin Dillon	Richard Childress Racing

Television in the United States
- Network: FS1
- Announcers: Adam Alexander, Michael Waltrip, and Kevin Harvick

Radio in the United States
- Radio: PRN

The 2015 Boyd Gaming 300 was the 3rd race of the 2015 NASCAR Xfinity Series season and 18th iteration of the event. The race was held at Las Vegas Motor Speedway a 1.500 mi (2.414 km) permanent asphalt quad-oval intermediate speedway in Las Vegas, Nevada on Saturday, March 7, 2015. Austin Dillon dominated the race leading 183 laps and won. Rounding out the top 3 where Erik Jones who finished 2nd and Brendan Gaughan who finished 3rd.

== Entry list ==
- (R) denotes a rookie driver
- (I) Ineligible for points

No	Driver	Team	Manufacturer
0	Harrison Rhodes (R)	JD Motorsports	Chevrolet
01	Landon Cassill	JD Motorsports	Chevrolet
1	Elliott Sadler	Roush Fenway Racing	Ford
2	Brian Scott	Richard Childress Racing	Chevrolet
3	Ty Dillon	Richard Childress Racing	Chevrolet
4	Ross Chastain (R)	JD Motorsports	Chevrolet
6	Bubba Wallace (R)	Roush Fenway Racing	Ford
7	Regan Smith	JR Motorsports	Chevrolet
8	Blake Koch	TriStar Motorsports	Toyota
9	Chase Elliott	JR Motorsports	Chevrolet
10	Jeff Green	TriStar Motorsports	Toyota
13	Derek White	MBM Motorsports	Toyota
14	Cale Conley (R)	TriStar Motorsports	Toyota
15	Cody Ware (I)	Rick Ware Racing	Chevrolet
16	Ryan Reed	Roush Fenway Racing	Ford
18	Daniel Suárez (R)	Joe Gibbs Racing	Toyota
19	Mike Bliss	TriStar Motorsports	Toyota
20	Erik Jones (I)	Joe Gibbs Racing	Toyota
22	Ryan Blaney	Team Penske	Ford
24	Eric McClure	JGL Racing	Toyota
25	John Wes Townley (I)	Athenian Motorsports	Chevrolet
28	J. J. Yeley	JGL Racing	Toyota
33	Austin Dillon (I)	Richard Childress Racing	Chevrolet
39	Ryan Sieg	RSS Racing	Chevrolet
40	Carl Long	MBM Motorsports	Dodge
42	Brennan Poole	HScott Motorsports	Chevrolet
43	Dakoda Armstrong	Richard Petty Motorsports	Ford
44	David Starr	TriStar Motorsports	Toyota
51	Jeremy Clements	Jeremy Clements Racing	Chevrolet
52	Joey Gase	Jimmy Means Racing	Chevrolet
54	Denny Hamlin (I)	Joe Gibbs Racing	Toyota
55	Jamie Dick	Viva Motorsports	Chevrolet
60	Chris Buescher	Roush Fenway Racing	Ford
62	Brendan Gaughan	Richard Childress Racing	Chevrolet
70	Derrike Cope	Derrike Cope Racing	Chevrolet
74	Mike Harmon	Mike Harmon Racing	Dodge
88	Dale Earnhardt Jr. (I)	JR Motorsports	Chevrolet
89	Morgan Shepherd	Shepherd Racing Ventures	Chevrolet
90	Mario Gosselin	King Autosport	Chevrolet
92	Dexter Bean	King Autosport	Chevrolet
97	Josh Reaume	Obaika Racing	Chevrolet
98	Aric Almirola (I)	Biagi–DenBeste Racing	Ford

== Qualifying ==
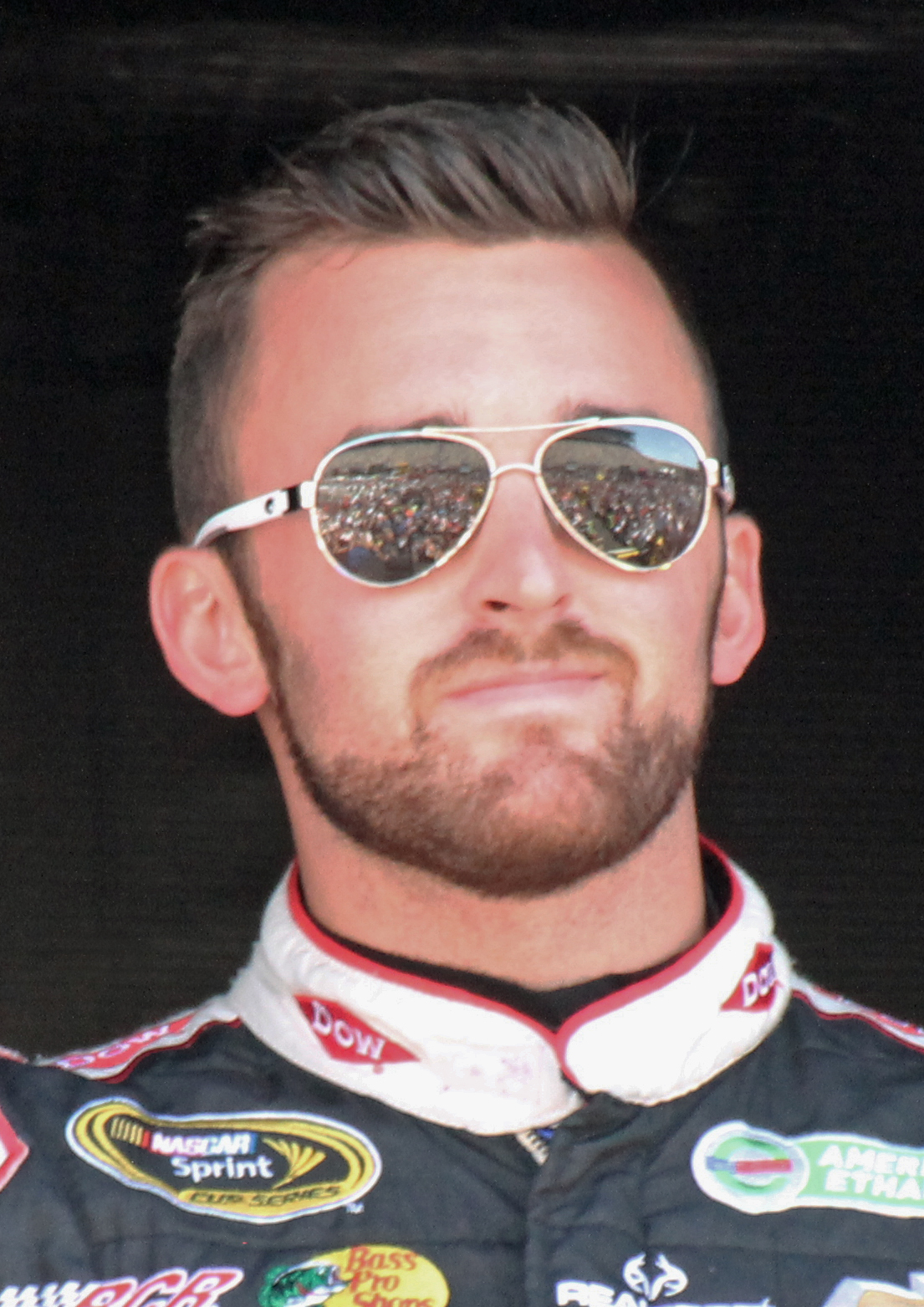
Austin Dillon won the pole

Grid	No	Driver	Team	Manufacturer	Time	Speed
1	33	Austin Dillon	Richard Childress Racing	Chevrolet	29.295	184.332
2	2	Brian Scott	Richard Childress Racing	Chevrolet	29.548	182.753
3	20	Erik Jones	Joe Gibbs Racing	Toyota	29.567	182.636
4	22	Ryan Blaney	Team Penske	Ford	29.600	182.432
5	62	Brendan Gaughan	Richard Childress Racing	Chevrolet	29.612	182.359
6	88	Dale Earnhardt Jr.	JR Motorsports	Chevrolet	29.758	181.464
7	7	Regan Smith	JR Motorsports	Chevrolet	29.764	181.427
8	9	Chase Elliott	JR Motorsports	Chevrolet	29.771	181.385
9	98	Aric Almirola	Biagi–DenBeste Racing	Ford	29.783	181.311
10	60	Chris Buescher	Roush Fenway Racing	Ford	29.790	181.269
11	54	Denny Hamlin	Joe Gibbs Racing	Toyota	29.817	181.105
12	6	Bubba Wallace	Roush Fenway Racing	Ford	29.910	180.542
13	1	Elliott Sadler	Roush Fenway Racing	Ford	29.860	180.844
14	39	Ryan Sieg	RSS Racing	Chevrolet	29.890	180.662
15	18	Daniel Suárez	Joe Gibbs Racing	Toyota	29.913	180.524
16	42	Brennan Poole	HScott Motorsports	Chevrolet	29.927	180.439
17	19	Mike Bliss	TriStar Motorsports	Toyota	29.937	180.379
18	16	Ryan Reed	Roush Fenway Racing	Ford	29.955	180.270
19	8	Blake Koch	TriStar Motorsports	Toyota	29.980	180.120
20	3	Ty Dillon	Richard Childress Racing	Chevrolet	29.981	180.114
21	25	John Wes Townley	Athenian Motorsports	Chevrolet	30.126	179.247
22	01	Landon Cassill	JD Motorsports	Chevrolet	30.129	179.229
23	43	Dakoda Armstrong	Richard Petty Motorsports	Ford	30.163	179.027
24	24	Eric McClure	JGL Racing	Toyota	30.362	177.854
25	51	Jeremy Clements	Jeremy Clements Racing	Chevrolet	30.351	177.918
26	55	Jamie Dick	Viva Motorsports	Chevrolet	30.396	177.655
27	28	J. J. Yeley	JGL Racing	Toyota	30.437	177.416
28	14	Cale Conley	TriStar Motorsports	Toyota	30.524	176.910
29	0	Harrison Rhodes	JD Motorsports	Chevrolet	30.582	176.574
30	40	Carl Long	MBM Motorsports	Dodge	30.875	174.899
31	44	David Starr	TriStar Motorsports	Toyota	30.889	174.820
32	90	Mario Gosselin	King Autosport	Chevrolet	31.038	173.980
33	13	Derek White	MBM Motorsports	Toyota	31.051	173.907
Qualified via Owner Points
34	10	Jeff Green	TriStar Motorsports	Toyota	31.402	171.964
35	52	Joey Gase	Jimmy Means Racing	Chevrolet	31.403	171.958
36	70	Derrike Cope	Derrike Cope Racing	Dodge	31.508	171.953
37	74	Mike Harmon	Mike Harmon Racing	Dodge	31.508	171.385
38	4	Ross Chastain	JD Motorsports	Chevrolet	31.544	171.189
39	89	Morgan Shepherd	Shepherd Racing Ventures	Chevrolet	31.904	169.258
40	15	Cody Ware	Rick Ware Racing	Chevrolet	31.981	168.850
Did not qualify
41	92	Dexter Bean	King Autosport	Chevrolet	31.225	172.938
42	97	Josh Reaume	Obaika Racing	Chevrolet	31.783	169.902
Official qualifying result

== Race results ==
Pos	No	Driver	Manufacturer	Laps	Status	Led	Points
1	33	Austin Dillon	Chevrolet	200	running	183	0
2	22	Ryan Blaney	Ford	200	running	2	43
3	7	Regan Smith	Chevrolet	200	running	0	41
4	54	Denny Hamlin	Toyota	200	running	1	0
5	9	Chase Elliott	Chevrolet	200	running	1	40
6	62	Brendan Gaughan	Chevrolet	200	running	3	39
7	6	Bubba Wallace	Ford	200	running	0	37
8	3	Ty Dillon	Chevrolet	200	running	0	36
9	42	Brennan Poole	Chevrolet	200	running	0	35
10	18	Daniel Suárez	Toyota	200	running	3	35
11	98	Aric Almirola	Ford	200	running	0	0
12	88	Dale Earnhardt Jr.	Chevrolet	199	running	0	0
13	1	Elliott Sadler	Ford	199	running	0	31
14	60	Chris Buescher	Ford	199	running	0	30
15	16	Ryan Reed	Ford	199	running	0	29
16	28	J. J. Yeley	Toyota	199	running	0	28
17	44	David Starr	Toyota	198	running	0	27
18	4	Ross Chastain	Chevrolet	198	running	0	26
19	25	John Wes Townley	Chevrolet	198	running	0	0
20	01	Landon Cassill	Chevrolet	198	running	0	24
21	39	Ryan Sieg	Chevrolet	197	running	0	23
22	51	Jeremy Clements	Chevrolet	197	running	0	22
23	24	Eric McClure	Toyota	196	running	0	21
24	195	Jamie Dick	Chevrolet	195	running	0	20
25	14	Cale Conley	Toyota	195	running	0	19
26	0	Harrison Rhodes	Chevrolet	193	running	0	18
27	52	Joey Gase	Chevrolet	192	running	0	17
28	13	Derek White	Toyota	175	running	0	16
29	20	Erik Jones	Toyota	172	crash	7	0
30	43	Dakoda Armstrong	Ford	164	crash	0	14
31	74	Mike Harmon	Dodge	164	running	0	13
32	90	Mario Gosselin	Chevrolet	154	crash	0	12
33	70	Derrike Cope	Chevrolet	113	running	0	11
34	15	Cody Ware	Chevrolet	80	suspension	0	0
35	8	Blake Koch	Toyota	52	crash	0	9
36	40	Carl Long	Dodge	34	electrical	0	8
37	89	Morgan Shepherd	Chevrolet	15	suspension	0	7
38	2	Brian Scott	Chevrolet	14	engine	0	6
39	19	Mike Bliss	Toyota	12	crash	0	5
40	10	Jeff Green	Toyota	3	vibration	0	4
Race Results

=== Race statistics ===
- 13 lead changes
- 6 cautions for 34 laps
- Time of race: 2 hour, 22 minute, 50 seconds
- Average speed: 126.021 mph (202.811 km/h)

Lap Leaders
Laps	Leader
1–20	Austin Dillon
21	Ryan Blaney
22–105	Austin Dillon
106	Brendan Gaughan
107–109	Daniel Suárez
110–112	Erik Jones
113–151	Austin Dillon
152–155	Erik Jones
156	Denny Hamlin
157–158	Brendan Gaughan
159	Chase Elliott
160–165	Austin Dillon
166	Ryan Blaney
167–200	Austin Dillon

Total laps led
Leader	Laps
Austin Dillon	183
Erik Jones	7
Brendan Gaughan	3
Daniel Suárez	3
Ryan Blaney	2
Denny Hamlin	1
Chase Elliott	1

== Standings after the race ==
	Pos	Driver	Points
	1	Ty Dillon	119
1	2	Chris Buescher	113 (–6)
	3	Ryan Reed	104 (–15)
	4	Bubba Wallace	103 (–16)
3	5	Chase Elliott	95 (–24)
8	6	Regan Smith	86 (–33)
6	6	Brendan Gaughan	86 (–33)
2	8	David Starr	83 (–36)
2	9	Elliott Sadler	82 (–37)
2	10	Ross Chastain	81 (–38)
1	11	Jeremy Clements	75 (–44)
7	12	Dakoda Armstrong	71 (–48)

- Note: Only the first 12 positions are included for the driver standings.

Previous race: 2015 Hisense 250	NASCAR Xfinity Series; 2015 season	Next race: 2015 Axalta Faster. Tougher. Brighter. 200
