= 2015 Axalta Faster. Tougher. Brighter. 200 =

4th race in the 2015 NASCAR Xfinity Series

Race details
- Race 4 of 33 of the 2015 NASCAR Xfinity Series
- Date: March 14, 2015
- Location: Phoenix International Raceway, Avondale, Arizona
- Course: Permanent racing facility
- Course length: 1 miles (1.6 km)
- Distance: 200 laps, 200 mi (320 km)
- Average speed: 126.021 miles per hour (202.811 km/h)

Pole position
Driver	Joey Logano	Team Penske
- Time: 26.627

Most laps led
Driver	Joey Logano	Team Penske
- Laps: 176

Winner
No. 22	Joey Logano	Team Penske

Television in the United States
- Network: FOX
- Announcers: Adam Alexander, Brad Keselowski, and Michael Waltrip

Radio in the United States
- Radio: MRN

The 2015 Axalta Faster. Tougher. Brighter. 200 was the 4th race of the 2015 NASCAR Xfinity Series season and 11th iteration of the event. The race was held at Phoenix International Raceway a 1 mi (1.6 km) permanent asphalt dogleg oval track in Avondale, Arizona on Saturday, March 14, 2015. Joey Logano led 176 and won the race. Rounding out the podium were Matt Kenseth, who finished 2nd, and Kevin Harvick, who finished 3rd.

== Background ==
The layout of Phoenix International Raceway, the venue where the race was held.

Phoenix International Raceway (PIR) is a 1 mi (1.6 km), low-banked tri-oval race track located in Avondale, Arizona. PIR is named after the nearby metropolitan area of Phoenix. PIR is owned and operated by International Speedway Corporation.

=== Entry list ===
- (R) denotes a rookie driver
- (I) Ineligible for points

No	Driver	Team	Manufacturer
0	Harrison Rhodes (R)	JD Motorsports	Chevrolet
01	Landon Cassill	JD Motorsports	Chevrolet
1	Elliott Sadler	Roush Fenway Racing	Ford
2	Brian Scott	Richard Childress Racing	Chevrolet
3	Ty Dillon	Richard Childress Racing	Chevrolet
4	Ross Chastain (R)	JD Motorsports	Chevrolet
6	Bubba Wallace (R)	Roush Fenway Racing	Ford
7	Regan Smith	JR Motorsports	Chevrolet
8	Blake Koch	Kaulig Racing	Toyota
9	Chase Elliott	JR Motorsports	Chevrolet
10	Jeff Green	TriStar Motorsports	Toyota
13	Derek White	MBM Motorsports	Dodge
14	Cale Conley (R)	TriStar Motorsports	Toyota
15	Enrique Contreras III	Rick Ware Racing	Chevrolet
16	Ryan Reed	Roush Fenway Racing	Ford
18	Daniel Suárez (R)	Joe Gibbs Racing	Toyota
19	Mike Bliss	TriStar Motorsports	Toyota
20	Matt Kenseth (I)	Joe Gibbs Racing	Toyota
22	Joey Logano (I)	Team Penske	Ford
24	Eric McClure	JGL Racing	Toyota
25	Dylan Lupton	RSS Racing	Chevrolet
28	J. J. Yeley	TriStar Motorsports	Toyota
33	Austin Dillon (I)	Richard Childress Racing	Chevrolet
39	Ryan Sieg	RSS Racing	Chevrolet
40	Carl Long	MBM Motorsports	Dodge
42	Brennan Poole	Chip Ganassi Racing	Chevrolet
43	Dakoda Armstrong	JGL Racing	Ford
44	David Starr	TriStar Motorsports	Toyota
51	Jeremy Clements	Jeremy Clements Racing	Chevrolet
52	Joey Gase	Jimmy Means Racing	Chevrolet
54	Erik Jones (I)	Joe Gibbs Racing	Toyota
55	Jamie Dick	Viva Motorsports	Chevrolet
56	Charles Lewandoski	Team Kapusta Racing	Chevrolet
60	Chris Buescher	Roush Fenway Racing	Ford
62	Brendan Gaughan	Richard Childress Racing	Chevrolet
70	Derrike Cope	Derrike Cope Racing	Chevrolet
74	Mike Harmon	Mike Harmon Racing	Dodge
88	Kevin Harvick (I)	JR Motorsports	Chevrolet
89	Morgan Shepherd	Shepherd Racing Ventures	Chevrolet
90	Mario Gosselin	King Autosport	Chevrolet
97	Peyton Sellers	Obaika Racing	Chevrolet

== Practice results ==
Practice was held on Friday, March 13th at 3:00 PM Mountain Time. Regan Smith was fastest in practice with the time of 26.930 and the speed of 133.680 mph (215.137 km/h).

Pos.	No	Driver	Team	Make	Time	Speed
1	7	Regan Smith	JR Motorsports	Chevrolet	26.930	133.680
2	3	Ty Dillon	Richard Childress Racing	Chevrolet	26.936	133.650
3	9	Chase Elliott	JR Motorsports	Chevrolet	27.030	133.185
Full practice results

== Qualifying ==
Qualifying was held at 9:45 AM Mountain Time. Joey Logano won the pole with the time of 26.627 and the speed of 135.201 mph (217.585 km/h).

Grid	No	Driver	Team	Manufacturer	Time	Speed
1	22	Joey Logano	Team Penske	Ford	26.627	135.201
2	88	Kevin Harvick	JR Motorsports	Chevrolet	26.718	134.741
3	54	Erik Jones	Joe Gibbs Racing	Toyota	26.729	134.685
4	20	Matt Kenseth	Joe Gibbs Racing	Toyota	26.740	134.630
5	33	Austin Dillon	Richard Childress Racing	Chevrolet	26.745	134.605
6	18	Daniel Suárez	Joe Gibbs Racing	Toyota	26.799	134.333
7	9	Chase Elliott	JR Motorsports	Chevrolet	26.838	134.138
8	7	Regan Smith	JR Motorsports	Chevrolet	26.872	133.968
9	62	Brendan Gaughan	Richard Childress Racing	Chevrolet	26.896	133.849
10	1	Elliott Sadler	Roush Fenway Racing	Ford	27.094	132.871
11	3	Ty Dillon	Richard Childress Racing	Chevrolet	27.244	132.139
12	2	Brian Scott	Richard Childress Racing	Chevrolet	N/A	
13	60	Chris Buescher	Roush Fenway Racing	Ford	27.145	132.621
14	43	Dakoda Armstrong	JGL Racing	Ford	27.168	132.509
15	39	Ryan Sieg	RSS Racing	Chevrolet	27.181	132.445
16	6	Bubba Wallace	Roush Fenway Racing	Ford	27.185	132.426
17	16	Ryan Reed	Roush Fenway Racing	Ford	27.336	131.694
18	51	Jeremy Clements	Jeremy Clements Racing	Chevrolet	27.417	131.305
19	8	Blake Koch	Kaulig Racing	Toyota	27.441	131.191
20	19	Mike Bliss	TriStar Motorsports	Toyota	27.442	131.186
21	42	Brennan Poole	Chip Ganassi Racing	Chevrolet	27.454	131.128
22	01	Landon Cassill	JD Motorsports	Chevrolet	27.562	130.615
23	25	Dylan Lupton	RSS Racing	Chevrolet	27.577	130.544
24	28	J. J. Yeley	TriStar Motorsports	Toyota	27.579	130.534
25	44	David Starr	TriStar Motorsports	Toyota	27.668	130.114
26	14	Cale Conley	TriStar Motorsports	Toyota	27.678	130.067
27	4	Ross Chastain	JD Motorsports	Chevrolet	27.749	129.734
28	55	Jamie Dick	Viva Motorsports	Chevrolet	27.819	129.408
29	0	Harrison Rhodes	JD Motorsports	Chevrolet	27.917	128.954
30	52	Joey Gase	Jimmy Means Racing	Chevrolet	27.988	128.627
31	24	Eric McClure	JGL Racing	Toyota	27.996	128.590
32	90	Mario Gosselin	King Autosport	Chevrolet	27.998	128.581
33	40	Carl Long	MBM Motorsports	Dodge	28.059	128.301
Qualified via Owner Points
34	97	Peyton Sellers	Obaika Racing	Chevrolet	28.444	126.564
35	70	Derrike Cope	Derrike Cope Racing	Chevrolet	28.564	126.033
36	10	Jeff Green	TriStar Motorsports	Toyota	28.694	125.462
37	15	Enrique Contreras III	Rick Ware Racing	Chevrolet	28.789	125.048
38	74	Mike Harmon	Mike Harmon Racing	Dodge	29.095	123.733
39	13	Derek White	MBM Motorsports	Dodge	29.102	123.703
40	56	Charles Lewandoski	Team Kapusta Racing	Chevrolet	28.145	127.909
Did not qualify
41	89	Morgan Shepherd	Shepherd Racing Ventures	Chevrolet		
Official qualifying result

== Race results ==
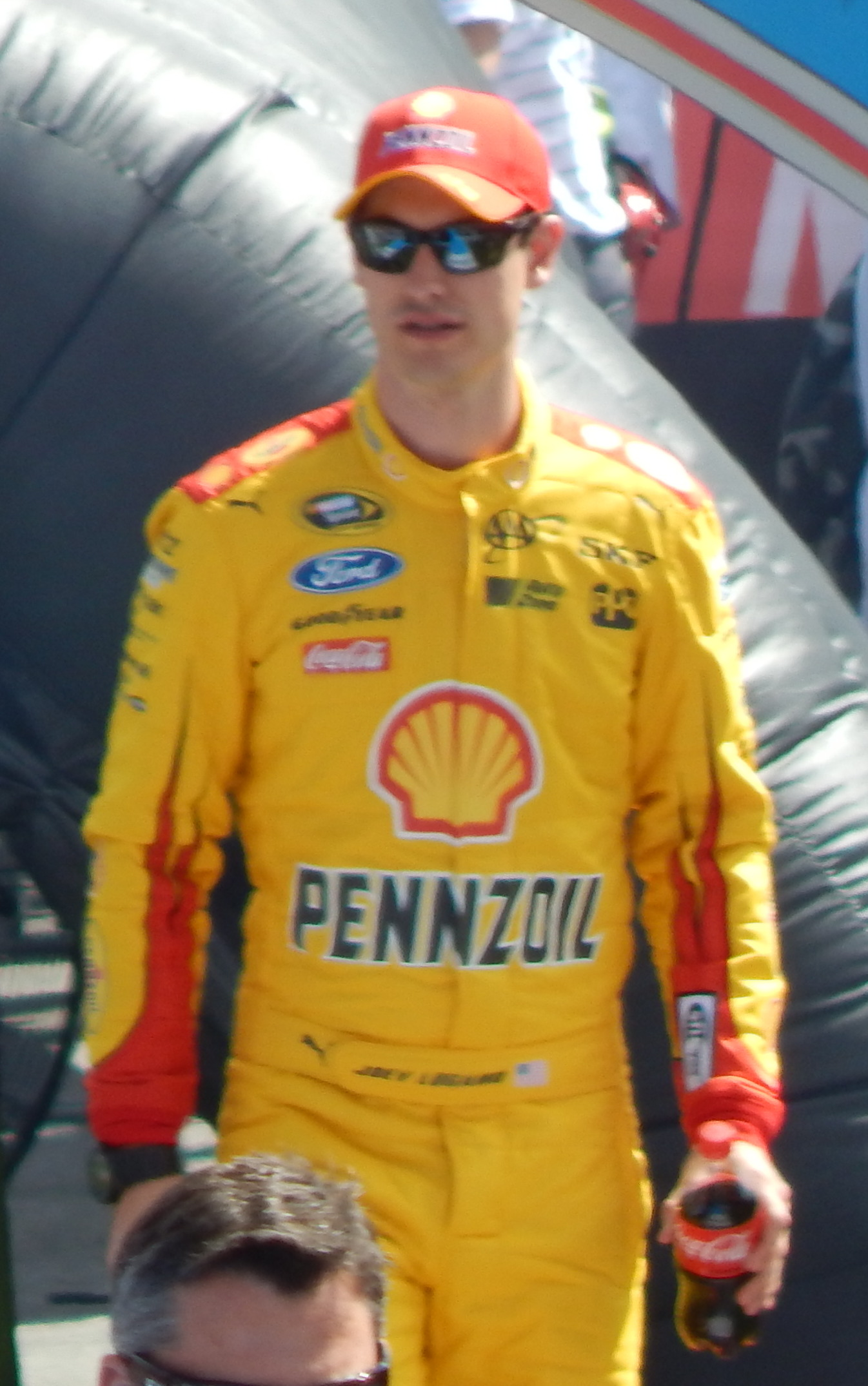
Joey Logano won the race.

Pos	No	Driver	Manufacturer	Laps	Status	Led	Points
1	22	Joey Logano	Ford	200	running	176	0
2	20	Matt Kenseth	Toyota	200	running	14	0
3	88	Kevin Harvick	Chevrolet	200	running	0	0
4	33	Austin Dillon	Chevrolet	200	running	4	0
5	54	Erik Jones	Toyota	200	running	0	0
6	3	Ty Dillon	Chevrolet	200	running	0	38
7	9	Chase Elliott	Chevrolet	200	running	0	37
8	62	Brendan Gaughan	Chevrolet	200	running	0	36
9	7	Regan Smith	Chevrolet	200	running	0	35
10	2	Brian Scott	Chevrolet	200	running	0	34
11	18	Daniel Suárez	Toyota	200	running	0	33
12	1	Elliott Sadler	Ford	200	running	0	32
13	16	Ryan Reed	Ford	200	running	0	31
14	60	Chris Buescher	Ford	200	running	0	30
15	6	Bubba Wallace	Ford	199	running	0	29
16	51	Jeremy Clements	Chevrolet	199	running	0	28
17	39	Ryan Sieg	Chevrolet	199	running	0	27
18	43	Dakoda Armstrong	Ford	199	running	0	26
19	25	Dylan Lupton	Chevrolet	199	running	0	25
20	19	Mike Bliss	Toyota	197	running	0	24
21	44	David Starr	Toyota	197	running	0	23
22	14	Cale Conley	Toyota	197	running	0	22
23	0	Harrison Rhodes	Chevrolet	197	running	0	21
24	28	J. J. Yeley	Toyota	197	running	0	20
25	8	Blake Koch	Toyota	197	running	0	19
26	42	Brennan Poole	Chevrolet	196	running	6	19
27	4	Ross Chastain	Chevrolet	196	running	0	17
28	55	Jamie Dick	Chevrolet	196	running	0	16
29	24	Eric McClure	Toyota	195	running	0	15
30	56	Charles Lewandoski	Chevrolet	195	running	0	14
31	52	Joey Gase	Chevrolet	193	running	0	13
32	13	Carl Long^{1}	Dodge	193	running	0	12
33	70	Derrike Cope	Chevrolet	192	running	0	11
34	15	Enrique Contreras III	Chevrolet	191	running	0	10
35	74	Mike Harmon	Dodge	165	suspension	0	9
36	97	Peyton Sellers	Chevrolet	118	engine	0	8
37	01	Landon Cassill	Chevrolet	91	crash	0	7
38	90	Mario Gosselin	Chevrolet	59	brakes	0	6
39	40	Derek White^{1}	Dodge	7	brakes	0	5
40	10	Jeff Green	Toyota	3	vibration	0	4
Race Results

- Notes: ^{1} – After qualifying, Carl Long and Derek White swapped rides.

=== Race statistics ===
- 7 lead changes between 4 drivers
- 4 cautions for 26 laps
- Time of race: 1 hour, 49 minute, 57 seconds
- Average speed: 109.141 mph (175.645 km/h)

Lap Leaders
Laps	Leader
1–50	Joey Logano
51–61	Matt Kenseth
62–96	Joey Logano
97–100	Austin Dillon
101–126	Joey Logano
127–132	Brennan Poole
133–135	Matt Kenseth
136–200	Joey Logano

Total laps led
Leader	Laps
Joey Logano	176
Matt Kenseth	14
Brennan Poole	6
Austin Dillon	4

== Standings after the race ==
	Pos	Driver	Points
	1	Ty Dillon	157
	2	Chris Buescher	143 (–14)
	3	Ryan Reed	135 (–22)
1	4	Chase Elliott	132 (–25)
	4	Bubba Wallace	132 (–25)
	6	Brendan Gaughan	122 (–35)
1	7	Regan Smith	121 (–36)
1	8	Elliott Sadler	114 (–43)
1	9	David Starr	106 (–51)
3	10	Daniel Suárez	103 (–54)
1	10	Jeremy Clements	103 (–54)
2	12	Ross Chastain	98 (–59)

- Note: Only the first 12 positions are included for the driver standings.

Previous race: 2015 Boyd Gaming 300	NASCAR Xfinity Series; 2015 season	Next race: 2015 Drive4Clots.com 300
