= Marty Beckerman =

American writer and humorist

Marty Beckerman is an American journalist, humorist, and author. He was born in Anchorage, Alaska, and started his career with The Anchorage Daily News between 1998 and 2000, when he was still a junior and sophomore at Steller Secondary School. He has since written for The New York Times, Wired, Playboy, Salon, Maxim, the Daily Beast, Discover, the Atlantic, and other publications. He is a former editor at Esquire.

Beckerman wrote his first book at age 16. He has since published three books, including The Heming Way: How to Unleash the Booze-Inhaling, Animal-Slaughtering, War-Glorifying, Hairy-Chested, Retro-Sexual Legend Within... Just Like Papa!, a parody of Ernest Hemingway.

== Notable works ==
=== Death to All Cheerleaders ===
In 2000, Beckerman independently published a selection of his Anchorage Daily News columns as Death to All Cheerleaders: One Adolescent Journalist's Cheerful Diatribe Against Teenage Plasticity.

=== Generation S.L.U.T. ===
In 2004, Generation S.L.U.T.: A Brutal Feel-Up Session with Today's Sex-Crazed Adolescent Populace, an exploration of the sex lives of modern teens. was published by Simon & Schuster and MTV Books.

When asked whether the book is a work of fiction or nonfiction, Beckerman replied that it is both. "The core of the book is the novella, but then I've got all the statistics, quotes from real kids, news clippings and other nonfiction elements. So I'm making the emotional case with my fictional characters, and the journalistic case with the hard numbers and quotes."

=== Dumbocracy ===
In September 2008, the Disinformation Company published Beckerman's third book, Dumbocracy: Adventures with the Loony Left, the Rabid Right and Other American Idiots.

=== The Heming Way ===
In 2011, Beckerman published The Heming Way: How to Unleash the Booze-Inhaling, Animal-Slaughtering, War-Glorifying, Hairy-Chested, Retro-Sexual Legend Within... Just Like Papa! It received praise from USA Today ("a laugh-out-loud parody") and Kirkus Reviews ("a funny collection"). It reached #1 on Amazon.com's parody bestseller list, and St. Martin's Press released an expanded edition in 2012.
