= Steller Secondary School =

- "Only the Educated are Free"

Location
- 2508 Blueberry Road; Anchorage, Alaska 99503; United States; 61°11′51″N 149°53′35″W

Information
- Type: Public alternative secondary
- Established: 1974 (52 years ago)
- CEEB code: 020007
- Principal: Maria Hernandez
- Faculty: 23
- Enrollment: 250 (2023-2024)
- Colours: Blue, royal blue, and green
- Mascot: Steller's Jay
- Website: www.asdk12.org/steller

Steller Secondary School is an alternative school located in Anchorage, Alaska. Steller Secondary was previously a seventh through twelfth grade school, but starting in August 2024, the Anchorage School District conjoined sixth grade with middle school, therefore having Steller Secondary adopt sixth grade into the grade range of students attending. The Anchorage School District established the school in 1974 as a response to a proposal by the Committee of Alternative Secondary Education. Steller was named after Georg Wilhelm Steller, a naturalist from Germany who traveled with Vitus Bering on an exploratory voyage to Alaska.

== History ==
For the first nine years of its existence, Steller was located in the old North Star Elementary School building. After much political activity by North Star parents, the Alaska Legislature approved funds to remodel the school and add a new gym as well as a drama facility/auditorium. In 1992, the auditorium was rebuilt after a structural failure caused the roof to collapse, leaving nearly everything ruined except for the stage's curtains. The voters of Anchorage approved a school bond in 2003 to provide funding for the addition of a new science lab and relocation and renovation of the staff lounge, offices surrounding the gymnasium, and the special education office. This construction was completed in October 2004.

== Notable alumni ==
- Marty Beckerman, author, humorist, journalist, and features editor with Esquire magazine
- Mark Begich, former mayor of Anchorage, Alaska and former U.S. Senator from Alaska
- Mario Chalmers, basketball player (7-9th grades)
- Gretchen Guess, member of Alaska House of Representatives 2000–2002 and Alaska Senate 2002–2006, Anchorage School District School Board Chair, 2011–2013
- Lindsey Holmes, member of Alaska House of Representatives 2006–present (9th through 11th grades)
- Jewel, singer (9th & 10th grades)
- Trajan Langdon, basketball player
- Balin Miller, climber
- Ian Pedigo, visual artist
