= Ian Pedigo =

American artist

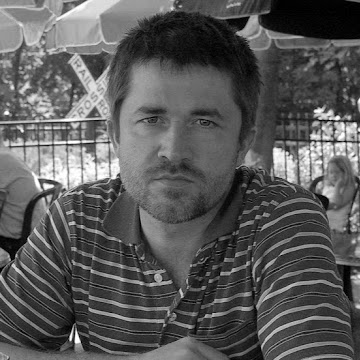
Ian Pedigo in 2007

Ian Pedigo (born 1973 in Anchorage, Alaska), is a sculptor, image and installation-based artist and writer living and working in New York, NY (Queens). Pedigo is known for his use of found materials and combining them with natural and hand-produced elements, producing abstract, conceptual works that are anthropological and artefactual in nature. He views his objects, assemblages and images as acts of discovery, creation, and recovery. His work is largely influenced by ideas of possible worlds as found in Modal realism, the ethics of humanism, as well as aesthetics-based ecologies found in Jane Bennett's Vibrant Matter.

== Life and career ==
Ian Pedigo was born on September 19, 1973, in Anchorage, Alaska. He grew up in a household with seven siblings from two marriages, surrounded by creeks, forests, and mountains. He initially pursued music, playing in bands during and after high school. After graduating from Steller Secondary School in 1991, he moved out of state in 1994 to pursue a career in music.

While living in San Francisco, Pedigo visited the San Francisco Museum of Modern Art, where he first encountered the work of Joseph Beuys. Beuys's art would become a lasting influence throughout Pedigo's formative years.

After discovering a deep interest in art, Pedigo moved to Dallas, Texas (where his father was from) and enrolled at the University of Dallas. There he studied sculpture and received an education in the Western Classical Literary Tradition. In 1999, he attended the University of Texas at Austin's Master's of Fine Arts program, earning his MFA in sculpture 2002. In 2001 he attended the Salzburg International Summer Academy of Fine Art, studying with the Russian installation artists Ilya Kabakov & Emilia Kabakov and the theorist/critic Boris Groys. In mid 2002, Pedigo moved to New York City with his wife, who he met at the architecture program at UT Austin.

His first solo show in New York took place at Klaus von Nichtssagend Gallery in 2006, earning critical attention for his unorthodox formal re-combinations of found materials. Subsequently, his work was exhibited internationally, with solo and group exhibitions held in London, Paris, Milan, Berlin, Brussels, Florence, Gothenburg (Sweden), and in Canada.

Pedigo has lectured widely on his work at universities and institutions in the US and Europe including the Modern Art Museum of Fort Worth, Chicago Art Institute, Hunter College, American University, University of Gothenburg, University of Lethbridge, University of Tennessee at Chattanooga, and Kent State University.

He is represented by Klaus von Nichtssagend Gallery in New York.

== Awards and public collections ==
Pedigo is the recipient of a Pollock-Krasner Foundation award, an Artists' Fellowship Inc. grant, a Foundation for Contemporary Arts grant.

His work is held in the collection of the Whitney Museum of American Art.

== Press ==
Pedigo's work has garnered critical praise in many art publications such as New York Times, the New Yorker, Artforum, Art in America, Hyperallergic, and ARTnews.

== Publications ==
In 2011 the Southern Alberta Art Gallery published a monograph on Pedigo's work featured writing by critic and curator Chris Sharp and an interview with the writer and critic Lillian Davies.

Sharp, Chris; Davies, Lillian (2011). Ian Pedigo: Works 2007-2010. Southern Alberta Art Gallery. ISBN 978-1894699495.
